= Time (disambiguation) =

Time is the continued sequence of existence and events, and a fundamental quantity of measuring systems.

Time or times may also refer to:

== Temporal measurement ==
- Time in physics, defined by its measurement
- Time standard, civil time specification
- Horology, study of the measurement of time
- Chronometry, science of the measurement of time
- Metre (music), the grouping of basic temporal units, called beats, into regular measures
  - Time signature, notational convention for the metre

== Businesses ==
- Time (bicycle company), a French bicycle manufacturer
- Time Inc., an American publisher of periodicals
- Time Computer Systems, a British brand of Granville Technology Group
- TIME Hotels Management, a UAE hotel management company

== Mathematics and its typography ==
- Times, the operation used for multiplication in mathematics
- Times symbol ×
- Time series, a sequence of data points in chronological order

== Computing ==
- Time (metadata), a representation term
- time (Unix), a shell command on Unix and Unix-like operating systems
- TIME (command), a shell command on DOS, OS/2 and Microsoft Windows operating systems
- System time, a computer's reckoning of real-world time
- Time Protocol, an Internet protocol
- Time: An Elastic Adventure, an upcoming video game

== Film and television ==
- Time (1999 film), a Tamil film
- Time (2006 film), a South Korean film
- Time (2007 film), a Malayalam film
- Time (2020 film), an American film
- Time (2021 film), a Hong Kong film
- Time (2006 British TV documentary), a 2006 documentary programme
- Time (2021 TV series), a 2021 BBC drama series
- Vremya or Time, a Russian TV news programme
- The Time (TV series), a 2018 South Korean television series
- "Time" (Doctor Who), a 2011 television mini-episode
- "Time" (Don't Hug Me I'm Scared), a 2014 web series episode
- "Time" (Our Girl), a 2014 television episode
- "Time" (Stargate Universe), a 2009 television episode
- "Time" (The Young Ones), a 1984 television episode

== Literature & print media ==
- Time (magazine), an American weekly news magazine
- Time (Burroughs book), a pamphlet by William S. Burroughs
- "Time" (xkcd), a strip of the webcomic
- Time (novel), a 1999 science fiction novel by Stephen Baxter

== Music ==
=== Bands ===
- The Time (band), a pop group
- Time (Yugoslav band), a rock band of the 1970s

=== Albums ===
- Time (Peter Andre album) (1997)
- Time (Arashi album) (2007)
- Time (Atlantic Starr album) (1994)
- Time (Beast EP) (2014)
- Time (Jakob Bro album) (2011)
- The Time (Bros album) (1989)
- Time (Bunny Rugs album) (2012)
- Time (Alex Calder EP)
- Time (Richard Carpenter album) (1987)
- Time (Dave Clark album) (1986)
- Time (Louis Cole album) (2018)
- Time (Mikky Ekko album) (2015)
- Time (Electric Light Orchestra album) (1981)
- Time (Fleetwood Mac album) (1995)
- Time (Simply Red album) (2023)
- Time (Steve Howe album) (2011)
- Time (Leo Ieiri album) (2018)
- Time (Kensington album) (2019)
- Time (Klinik album) (1991)
- T.I.M.E. (The Inner Mind's Eye), a 1993 album by Leaders of the New School
- Time (Hugh Masekela album) (2002)
- Time (Mercyful Fate album) (1994)
- The Time, an EP by Orange Goblin
- Time (Lionel Richie album) (1998)
- Time (Demis Roussos album) (1988)
- Time (The Spoiled EP) (2024)
- Time (Steeleye Span album) (1996)
- Time (Rod Stewart album) (2013)
- Time (Third Day album) (1999)
- Time (Time album) (1972)
- The Time (The Time album) (1981)
- Time (TVXQ album) (2013)
- Time (The Revelator), a 2001 album by Gillian Welch
- Time (Wild album) (2004)
- Time I, a 2012 album by Wintersun
- The Time (Xu Weizhou album) (2017)
- Time (Bibi Zhou album) (2009)
- Times (SG Lewis album), 2021
- Times (Wolfgang Flür album), 2025

=== Songs ===
- "Time" (The Alan Parsons Project song), 1980
- "Time" (David Bowie song), 1973
- "Time" (Dean Brody song), 2016
- "Time" (Chase & Status song), 2011
- "Time" (Childish Gambino song), 2020
- "Time" (Free Nationals, Mac Miller and Kali Uchis song), 2019
- "Time" (INXS song), 1994
- "Time" (Izabo song), 2012
- "Time" (Marion song), 1996
- "Time" (Freddie Mercury song), 1986
- "Time" (K. Michelle song), 2016
- "Time" (Music for Pleasure song), 1983
- "Time" (NF song), 2019
- "Time" (O.Torvald song), 2017
- "Time" (Pink Floyd song), 1973
- "Time" (Hikaru Utada song), 2020
- "Time" (Uzari & Maimuna song), 2015
- "Time" (Tom Waits song), 1985
- "Time" (Kim Wilde song), 1990
- "Time (Clock of the Heart)", by Culture Club, 1982
- "The Time (Dirty Bit)", by The Black Eyed Peas, 2010
- "Time", by Arca from KiCk I, 2020
- "Time", by Alex Calder from Time, 2013
- "Time", by All Hail the Silence from Daggers, 2019
- "Time", by Anastacia from Anastacia, 2004
- "Time", by Angra from Angels Cry, 1993
- "Time", by Anthrax on Persistence of Time, 1990
- "Time", by the Backstreet Boys from Black & Blue, 2000
- "Time", by Band-Maid from Just Bring It, 2017
- "Time", by Bebe Rexha from Dirty Blonde, 2026
- "Time", by Benny Benassi from Hypnotica, 2003
- "Time", by Blink-182 from Buddha, 1994
- "Time", by Boyzone from Brother, 2010
- "Time", by Jonatha Brooke from My Mother Has 4 Noses, 2014
- "Time", by Brymo from Libel, 2020
- "Time", by The Devil Wears Prada from Color Decay, 2022
- "Time", by Ecco2k from E, 2019
- "Time", by Embodyment from Songs for the Living, 2002
- "Time", by Samantha Fox from Angel with an Attitude, 2005
- "Time", by Hootie & The Blowfish from Cracked Rear View, 1994
- "Time", by iamnot, 2017
- "Time", by Chantal Kreviazuk from What If It All Means Something, 2002
- "Time", by Lower Than Atlantis from Lower Than Atlantis, 2014
- "Time", by Luna from Lunapark, 1992
- "Time", by Madness from Mad Not Mad, 1985
- "Time", by Michael Merchant, sung by Pozo-Seco Singers and also on Campbell's album Galveston, 1966
- "Time" by John Miles on Stranger in the City, 1977
- "Time", by Ne-Yo from In My Own Words, 2006
- "Time", by Joe Satriani on Crystal Planet, 1998
- "Time", by SB19 from Simula at Wakas, 2025
- "Time", by Ringo Starr from Y Not, 2010
- "Time", by Supergrass from I Should Coco, 1995
- "Time", by Taproot from Welcome, 2002
- "Time", by Joe Walsh from Got Any Gum?, 1987
- "Time", by Fetty Wap from Fetty Wap, 2015
- "Time", by Dennis Wilson from Pacific Ocean Blue, 1977
- "Time", by Hans Zimmer from Inception: Music from the Motion Picture, 2010
- "Time (Take Your Time)", by Scatman John from Scatman's World, 1995
- "Time", by Syn Cole, 2020
- "Time", from the musical Avenue Q, 2003

=== Musicals ===
- Time (musical), by Dave Clark, David Soames, Jeff Daniels and David Pomeranz

== Places ==
- Time Municipality, a municipality in Rogaland county, Norway
- Time, Illinois, a hamlet in Pike County, Illinois, US

== Other uses ==
- Time (cigarette), an Israeli cigarette brand
- Time Church, a church near Bryne in Rogaland county, Norway
- Titan Mare Explorer (TiME), a proposed spacecraft
- Top Industrial Managers for Europe (TIME), a network of engineering schools and technical universities
- Fountain of Time or Time, a Chicago sculpture
- Father Time, a personification of time
- Time poverty, lack of free time

== See also ==
- Grammatical tense
- Thyme
- TYME
- My Time (disambiguation)
- Real-time (disambiguation)
- Spacetime (disambiguation)
- The Times (disambiguation)
- Timeless (disambiguation)
- Timescape (disambiguation)
- Tine (disambiguation)
- Tyne (disambiguation)
- Time Bandit (disambiguation)
