= Bandit (disambiguation) =

A bandit is a person who engages in banditry.

Bandit, The Bandit or Bandits may also refer to:

== Arts and entertainment ==
=== Film and television ===
- A Bandit, a 1913 short film starring Fatty Arbuckle
- The Bandit (1946 film), an Italian drama originally titled Il Bandito
- The Bandit (1996 film), a Turkish drama originally titled Eşkıya
- Bandits (1997 film), a German film directed by Katja von Garnier
- Bandits (2001 film), an American film directed by Barry Levinson
- Bandit (film), a Canadian film directed by Allan Ungar
- The Bandits (film), a 1967 Mexican/American film
- the lead character in the Smokey and the Bandit film franchise, originally played by Burt Reynolds
- Bandit (TV series), a Welsh language music television show
- Bandit Heeler, the father of the main character in the Australian television preschool series Bluey
- Bandit, a dog in the animated television series Jonny Quest and The New Adventures of Jonny Quest
- Bandit Princess, a character in the animated series Adventure Time episode "I Am a Sword"

=== Music ===
- The Bandits (band), an English blues band
- Bandits (Belgian band), a Belgian band
- Bandit (band), a British rock band
- "Bandit" (Juice Wrld and YoungBoy Never Broke Again song), a song by Juice Wrld and YoungBoy Never Broke Again
- "Bandit" (Don Toliver song), 2024 song by Don Toliver
- The Bandit (rapper), an Australian rapper who placed sixth on Australia's Got Talent season 5
- The Bandit (album), a 1972 country music album by The Nashville String Band
- "The Bandit" (song), a 2021 song by Kings of Leon from their album When You See Yourself

=== Other ===
- The Bandits (ballet), first presented by the Imperial Ballet in 1875
- Bandit (Yomiuriland), a roller coaster in Japan
- Bandits: Phoenix Rising, a 2002 racing video game
- Donyell Taylor, a Marvel comics mutant superhero known as Night Thrasher or Bandit
- Bandits (book), by Eric Hobsbawm discussing the history of social bandits

== Sports teams ==
=== United States ===
- Baltimore Bandits, an American Hockey League team from 1995 to 1997
- Bay Area Bandits, a Women's Football Alliance team
- Bend Bandits, a minor league baseball team based in Bend, Oregon, which played in the independent Western Baseball League from 1995 to 1998
- Border City Bandits, a professional ice hockey team from Texarkana, Texas, which played in the Central Hockey League during the 2000–2001 season
- Boston Bandits, formerly the Bridgewater Bandits, a Tier III Junior A ice hockey team in the Eastern Hockey League
- Buffalo Bandits, a National Lacrosse League team
- Chicago Bandits, a women's professional softball team
- Chinese Bandits, a group of football players on the 1958 and 1959 LSU Tigers college team who achieved iconic status
- Gulf Coast Bandits, a defunct World Basketball Association team
- Jackson Bandits, an ice hockey team in the East Coast Hockey League
- Quad Cities River Bandits, a Class A minor league baseball team based in Davenport, Iowa
- San Angelo Bandits, a professional indoor football team based in San Angelo, Texas
- Sioux City Bandits, a professional indoor football team
- St. Louis Bandits (2006-2012) or Texarkana Bandits (2003-2006), a former Tier II Junior A ice hockey team in the North American Hockey League (now the Minnesota Wilderness)
- Tampa Bay Bandits, a United States Football League team

=== Australia ===
- Albury Wodonga Bandits, a South East Australian Basketball League team
- Brisbane Bandits, an Australian Baseball League team
- Brisbane Bandits (1989–1998), a former Australian Baseball League team

=== Canada ===
- Brooks Bandits, an Alberta Junior Hockey League team
- Burlington Bandits, an independent baseball team based in Burlington, Ontario
- Cumberland Bandits, a National Capital Junior Hockey League team based in Cumberland, Ontario
- Lloydminster Bandits, a North Eastern Alberta Junior B Hockey League team
- Vancouver Bandits, a Canadian Elite Basketball League team based in Abbotsford, British Columbia

=== Elsewhere ===
- Belmopan Bandits, a football team in the Premier League of Belize
- Berwick Bandits, a speedway team in the British Premier League
- Rhein-Neckar Bandits, an American football team based in Mannheim, Germany
- West Bandits Solo, an Indonesian basketball team

== Motorcycling ==
- A member of the Bandidos Motorcycle Club
- Suzuki Bandit series, a Suzuki motorcycle series
- Triumph Bandit, a 1970 British motorcycle prototype

== People ==
- Daniel James Bandit (born 1980), better known as Ghostshrimp, American graphic artist
- Harry Gant (born 1940), NASCAR driver nicknamed "the Bandit"
- Bandit (drag queen)

== Other uses ==
- The NATO brevity code for an enemy aircraft
- Redbanded rockfish, a species of fish also called bandit
- Bandit.fm, a former online music store operated by Sony Corporation
- KRFN, a commercial radio station in Reno, Nevada, branded 100.9 The Bandit
- Bandit Radio or Bandit 105.5, one of the first commercial broadcasting radio stations in Sweden
- RSS Bandit, an open source RSS/Atom aggregator based on the Microsoft .NET framework
- Multi-armed bandit, a problem in probability theory
- Bandit, a small pouch of chewing tobacco marketed by Skoal

== See also ==
- Bhandit Thongdee, a Thai film director, screenwriter and producer
- Bandito (disambiguation)
- Bandido (disambiguation)
- Time Bandit (disambiguation)
