= RPL =

RPL may refer to:

== Computing ==
- Raptor Lake series Intel CPUs
- Real-time Programming Language
- Reciprocal Public License, a software license
- Remote Program Load, a network boot protocol
- Request Parameter List in, e.g., VSAM, VTAM
- RPL (programming language) for HP calculators 1984–2015
- Routing Protocol for Low power and Lossy Networks, a networking protocol

== Politics ==
- Reichspropagandaleitung der NSDAP, propaganda department of the Nazi Party
- Radical Party of Oleh Liashko, political party in Ukraine

== Other uses ==
- Ramped Powered Lighter, a British landing craft
- Recognition of prior learning, a method to evaluate learning outside the classroom
- Recycled plastic lumber, a building material
- Russian Premier League, association football league
- Registered Public Safety Leader (RPL), a certification offered by the Association of Public-Safety Communications Officials-International
- Recurrent Pregnancy Loss, a term for recurrent miscarriages

== See also ==
- RP 1 (disambiguation)
- RPI (disambiguation)
- Richmond Public Library (disambiguation)
