= BPB =

BPB may refer to:

- BPB plc (British Plaster Board), a British building materials business
- Ballet Palm Beach, an American professional ballet company
- BIOS parameter block, a computing data structure
- Boridi Airport, Boridi, Papua New Guinea, IATA airport code BPB
- Badarpur Junction railway station, Assam, India (station code: BPB)
- Brighton Photo Biennial, a month-long British festival of photography
- Bromophenol blue, a dye
- Federal Agency for Civic Education (Bundeszentrale für politische Bildung, or bpb), a German government agency
- Pasto language, ISO 639-3 code bpb
- Buffalo Pothole Bandit, an American street artist
