= Real-time =

Real-time, realtime, or real time may refer to:

== Computing ==
- Real-time computing, hardware and software systems subject to a specified time constraint
- Real-time clock, a computer clock that keeps track of the current time
- Real-time Control System, a reference model architecture suitable for software-intensive, real-time computing
- Real-time Programming Language, a compiled database programming language which expresses work to be done by a particular time

=== Applications ===
- Real-time computer graphics, sub-field of computer graphics focused on producing and analyzing images in real time
- Real-time camera, for controlling views in a 3D virtual environment
- Real-time communication, for interactive communication
- Real-time operating system, for running real-time software
- Real-time protection, protection enabled constantly, rather than by, for example, an antivirus scan
- Real-time text, transmitted as it is being typed or produced
- Real-time Java, for real-time programs in Java programming language
- Real-time disk encryption, encrypting data as it is written to disk
- Real-time web, whereby information is sent to users as it becomes available
- Live streaming, continuously delivering multimedia as the depicted events are happening
- Real-Time Streaming Protocol, an internet protocol for real-time media streaming
- Collaborative real-time editor, simultaneous editing of a document by several users
- Real-time simulation, simulation able to run at the same rate as reality
- Real-time blackhole list, a Domain Name System (DNS) blacklist
- Real-time Cmix, a music programming language
- Real-Time AudioSuite, audio plug-in software for Avid Pro Tools

== Other science and technology ==
- Real-time locating system, a system used to automatically identify and track the location of objects or people in real time
- Real-time gross settlement, an online system for settling financial transactions
- Real-time kinematic, a satellite navigation technique
- Real-time polymerase chain reaction, a laboratory technique which monitors target DNA during the PCR

== Companies ==
- Realtime Associates, an American video game developer
- Realtime Games Software, a defunct British video game developer
- Realtime Gaming, a company that develops gambling software
- Realtime Worlds, a Scottish game developer

== Film, television and radio ==
- Real time (media), a method where events are portrayed at the same rate at which the characters experience them
- Real Time (Doctor Who), a webcast
- Real Time (film), a 2008 film
- RealTime (radio show), a radio show on CBC 2
- Real Time (TV channel), an Italian television channel
- Real Time with Bill Maher, a talk/interview show on HBO

== Music ==
- Real Time (The Jazztet album), 1986, by the Art Farmer/Benny Golson Jazztet
- Real Time (Steam album), 1996
- Real Time (Van der Graaf Generator album), 2007
- Realtime (C:Real album), 1997
- Realtime (Shapeshifter album), 2001
- Realtime (quartet), a barbershop quartet

== Art and literature ==
- Real Time (2004), a novel by Pnina Moed Kass
- RealTime, an Australian arts magazine
- Real Time (art series), a series of clocks by Maarten Baas

== See also ==
- On the fly, a phrase used to describe something that is being changed while it is ongoing
