= Bandito =

Bandito is the Italian word for bandit. It may refer to:

== Arts and entertainment ==
- Il Bandito, the Italian title of the 1946 Italian film The Bandit

== Music ==
- Banditos (band), an American rock and roll band
- The Bandito Tour, a world tour by American rock band Twenty One Pilots

=== Songs ===
- "Banditos" (song), a 1996 song by American alternative rock band The Refreshments
- "Bandito", a 1982 song by Gino Vannelli
- "El Bandito", a 1966 song by René y René
- "Bandito", a song by Dick Dale from the 1996 album Calling Up Spirits
- "Bandito", a song by Twenty One Pilots from their 2018 album Trench

== Other ==
- A frazione (administrative division) of Bra, Piedmont, Italy
  - Bandito railway station, a railway station in the frazione
- El Bandito, ring name of Welsh professional wrestler Orig Williams (1931–2009)
- George S. Patton (1885–1945), U.S. Army general nicknamed Bandito
- The Banditos, a rebellion of characters in the lore of alternative rock band Twenty One Pilots, who oppose Dema
- The Frito Bandito, a cartoon mascot used in advertisements for the snack food Fritos
- Banditos, collaborators and supporters of American artist Buffalo Pothole Bandit

== See also ==
- Bandido (disambiguation)
- Bandit (disambiguation)
