= Magnum XL-200 =

Steel roller coaster at Cedar Point

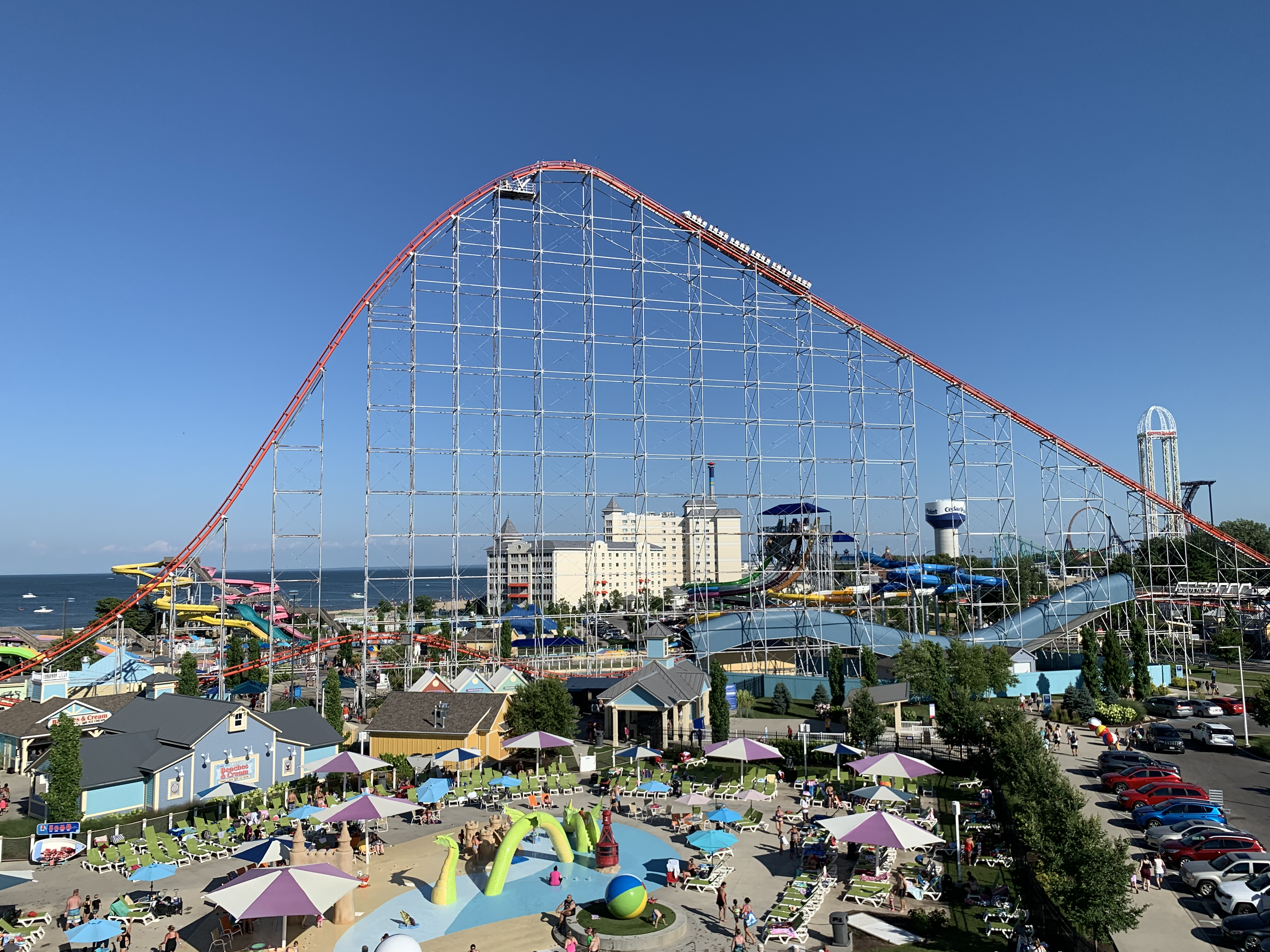

Cedar Point
- Location: Cedar Point
- Park section: Gemini Midway
- Coordinates: 41°29′7.25″N 82°41′10″W
- Status: Operating
- Opening date: May 6, 1989
- Cost: US$8,000,000

General statistics
- Type: Steel
- Manufacturer: Arrow Dynamics
- Designer: Ron Toomer
- Model: Hyper Coaster
- Track layout: Out-and-back
- Lift/launch system: Chain lift hill
- Height: 205 ft (62 m)
- Drop: 194.7 ft (59.3 m)
- Length: 5,106 ft (1,556 m)
- Speed: 72 mph (116 km/h)
- Inversions: 0
- Duration: 2:00
- Max vertical angle: 60°
- Capacity: 2,000 riders per hour
- Height restriction: 48 in (122 cm)
- Trains: 3 trains with 6 cars; riders arranged 2 across in 3 rows for a total of 36 riders per train
- Fast Lane available
- Magnum XL-200 at RCDB

Magnum XL-200, colloquially known as simply Magnum, is a steel roller coaster built by Arrow Dynamics at Cedar Point in Sandusky, Ohio. When it opened in 1989, it was the tallest, fastest, and steepest complete-circuit roller coaster in the world as well as the first hypercoaster – a roller coaster that exceeds 200 feet (61 m) in height. Some have credited Magnum with starting a period in the industry known as the roller coaster wars, in which amusement parks competed with one another at a rapid pace to build the next tallest and fastest roller coaster. More than 40 million people had ridden Magnum by 2009.

Magnum XL-200 held the title of tallest roller coaster in the world until 1994 when The Big One opened at Pleasure Beach Resort in the United Kingdom, as well as the title of longest drop and fastest speed until surpassed two years later by Steel Phantom at Kennywood outside Pittsburgh. Amusement Today's Golden Ticket Awards ranked the ride as the best steel roller coaster each year from 1998 to 2000. Magnum XL-200 continues to rank among the top 50 steel roller coasters; as of 2022, it was ranked 25th in the world.

== History ==
By the mid-1980s, Cedar Point had grown into a successful collection of roller coasters and other smaller rides on the shores of Lake Erie. In 1986, Dick Kinzel took over as president and CEO of Cedar Fair, the company that operated the park at the time. Kinzel saw a report on CNN in 1988 about the opening of a new coaster in Japan called Bandit at Yomiuriland that emphasized height and speed but had no inversions. Kinzel wanted to introduce a similar coaster that emphasized steep drops and negative g-forces over inversions and spins, which were common at the time. It had been 10 years since the last major addition, Gemini, was introduced. Cedar Point asked for proposals from TOGO, Dinn Corporation, Intamin and Arrow Dynamics to build a roller coaster without inversions or over-the-shoulder restraints. They chose Arrow, due to the weakness of the dollar at the time, which eliminated overseas production. Arrow was also working on the new Iron Dragon at the time. Arrow and Ron Toomer proposed a 187 feet (57 m)-tall coaster, to best the then-largest roller coaster drop on Shockwave at Six Flags Great America. That got Cedar Point's management interested in breaking the 200-foot (61 m) barrier, partly because of the publicity to be gained from building the first roller coaster to do so. The name Magnum XL-200 was chosen because Magnum, P.I. was popular at the time. "XL" and "200" were added for "extra-long" and standing at least 200 feet (61 m) tall, respectively. The original proposal was to cost $7.5 million, but was raised to $8 million after the height was extended to 200 feet (61 m). Funds from Cedar Fair going public on the New York Stock Exchange in April 1987 were used to fund the ride.

=== Construction and opening ===
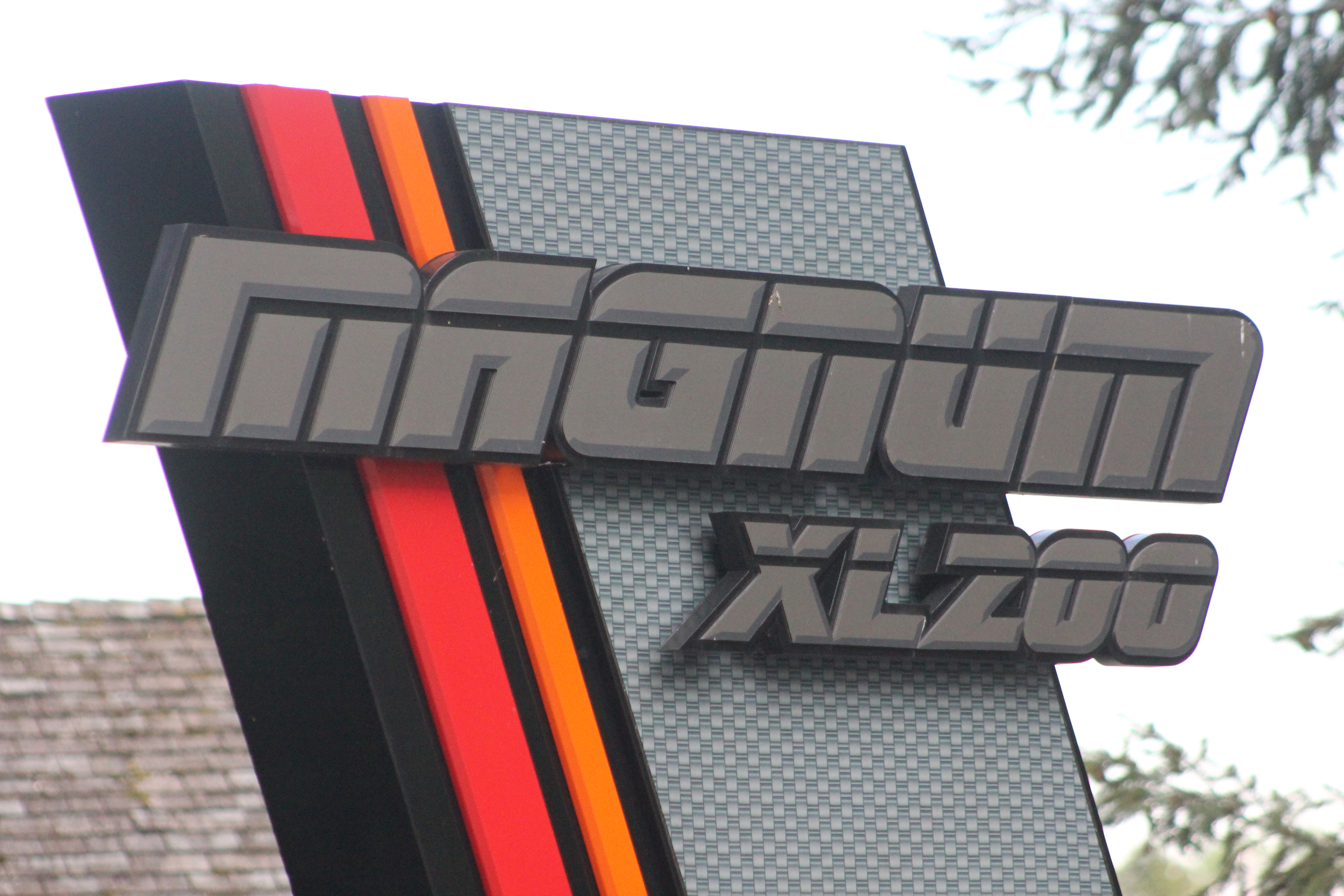
Entrance sign introduced on Magnum's 20th anniversary in 2009

Magnum XL-200 was announced on August 16, 1988, and construction began shortly thereafter. Following its completion in 1989, Kinzel was one of the first people to ride the coaster, boarding the train after one test cycle. It officially opened to the public on May 6, 1989, as the world's tallest, fastest and steepest complete-circuit roller coaster. It was measured for the Guinness Book of World Records on June 2. Cedar Point set a record attendance in 1989, due in part to the introduction of Magnum.

Magnum is often credited as shifting the focus of Cedar Point, as noted by then-park Vice President, John Hildebrandt: "We all were smart enough to know we had something. Big steel made a big difference and with Magnum we started branding ourselves as a big time roller coaster park". Magnum was awarded the ACE Roller Coaster Landmark award on June 21, 2004. To date, Magnum has been repainted once; the original track color was scarlet red, and later repainted Molly orange in late 2005 which was completed in 2006. Cedar Point celebrated Magnum's 20th anniversary on opening day in 2009 with a ceremony and an appearance by Ron Toomer, its designer. A new entrance sign was also introduced.

Magnum XL-200 has been the target of false rumors since 1998 claiming the structure was sinking due to unstable ground. The rumors supposedly started as an April Fools' Day joke in an Ohio newspaper, but quickly spread via the Internet. Cedar Point quickly denounced such rumors.

In 2019, Magnum XL-200 celebrated its 30th anniversary. The ride was repainted and new special effects were installed in the third tunnel.

== Ride experience ==
=== Layout ===
After the train departs the station, it travels over the resort gate walkway, down a slight decline into a 90-degree turn to the right and engages the chain, which operates at a speed of 6 mph (9.7 km/h), to begin the 205-foot (62 m) climb to the top of the lift hill. The train descends 194.7 feet (59.3 m) at a 60-degree angle, reaching a top speed of 72 miles per hour (116 km/h). The train then ascends a 157-foot (48 m) camelback hill, curving to the left into the first tunnel. Coming out of the tunnel, the train ascends a third, 80-foot (24 m)-tall hill. After the third hill, it enters a set of trim brakes and a pretzel-shaped turnaround where it curves to the left toward the beach and then left again into another tunnel. The train then traverses over seven airtime hills and a third tunnel into a mid-course brake run. The train turns left and goes back over the walkway to Cedar Point Shores. It then turns right and enters the brake run, followed by a 90-degree right turn back into the station. One cycle of the ride lasts about 2 minutes.

=== Trains ===
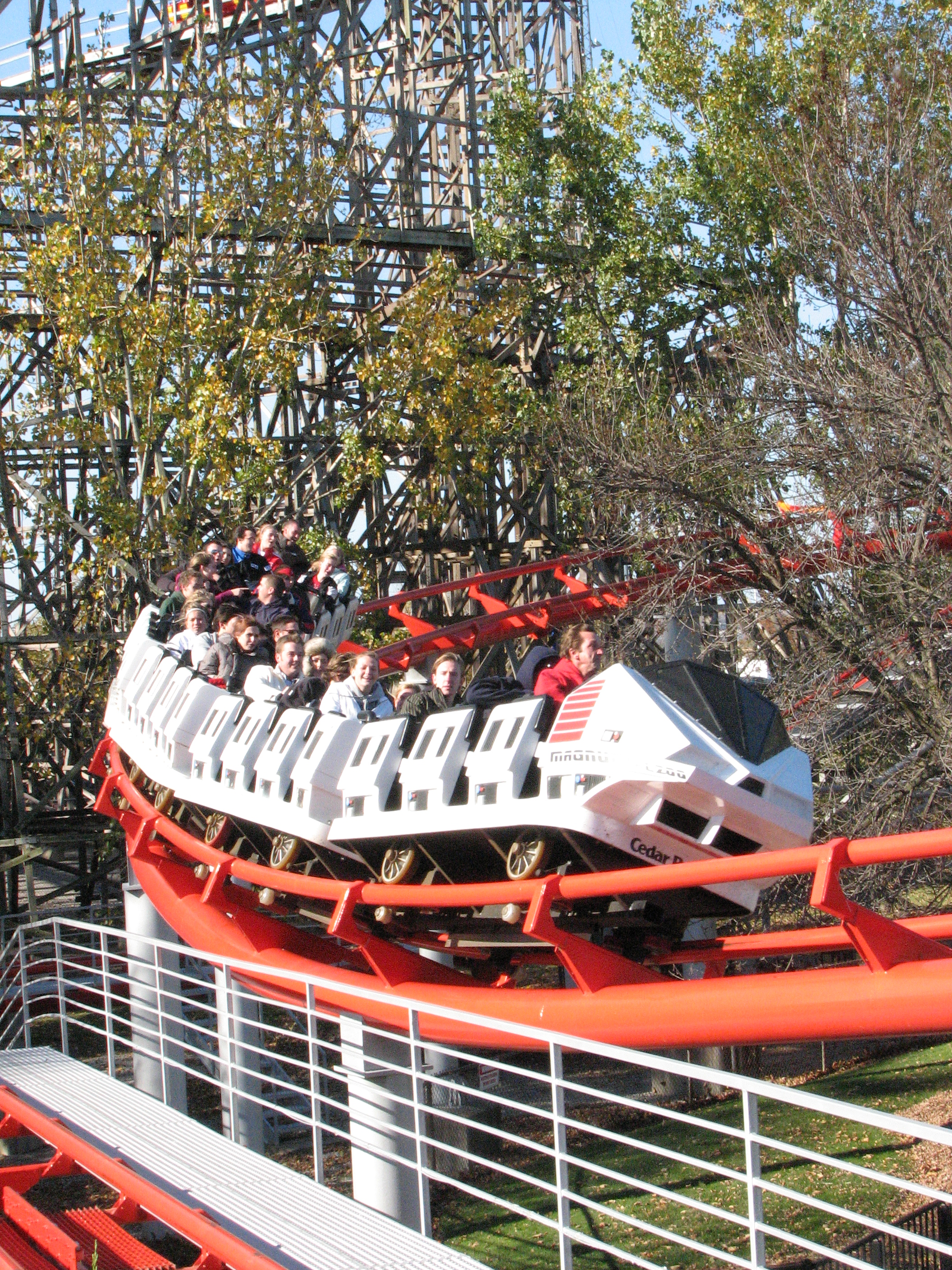
Riders coming back to the station

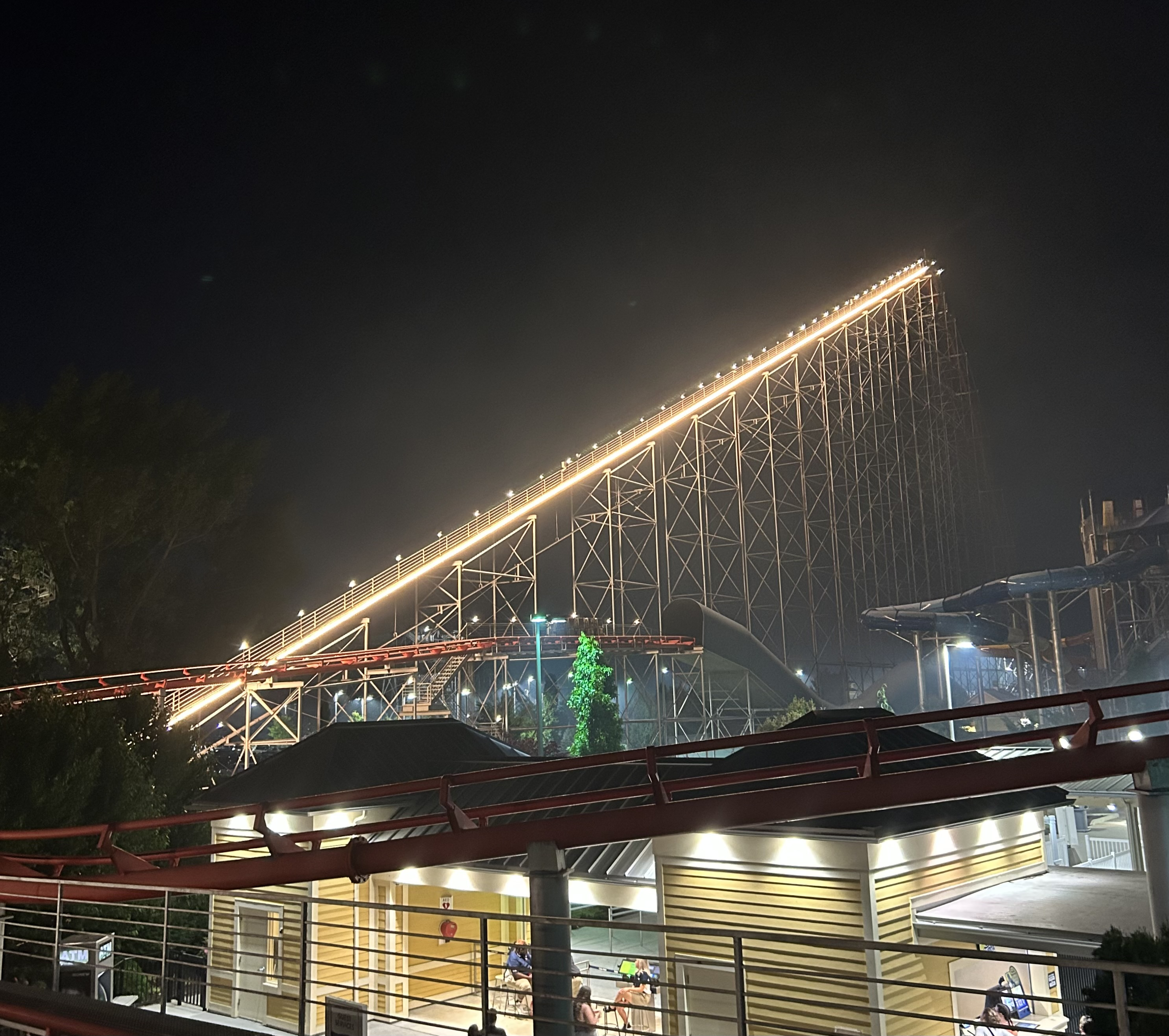
Magnum XL-200 illuminated at night in July 2023

Magnum XL-200 has three white-and-black trains. Each train has red, black or blue striping at the front. Each train has six cars; riders are arranged two-across in three rows for a total of 36 riders per train. Riders are secured by an individual ratcheting lap bar and a seat belt.

When Magnum XL-200 opened, it used up-stop pads similar to those still in use on Gemini, as well as Cedar Creek Mine Ride. Shortly after its debut, however, these up-stop plates were replaced with more traditional up-stop wheels that stops excess wear and tear.

=== Track ===
Magnum XL-200's steel track is 5,106 feet (1,556 m) in length, and its main hill is approximately 205 feet (62 m) high. The track consists of a tubular steel spine connected by struts to tubular steel running rails. Like other Arrow coasters at the time, sections of Magnum's track were hand-welded together in place without the assistance of computer-aided design, leading to bumpy, non-smooth transitions throughout the course of the ride. Each track section's measurement ranges from 2 to 200 feet (0.61 to 60.96 m), and 157 structural columns are used for support.

== Incidents ==
On May 26, 2007, one of the coaster's trains collided with another at less than 10 miles per hour (16 km/h), causing minor damage to both trains and minor injuries to at least three passengers. Two people were taken to a first aid station, and a third person was taken to a local hospital because of an asthma attack. The ride reopened the next day and park spokesman Robin Innes said the accident was caused by rain: "We think it was just caused by excessive moisture on the tracks due to the heavy rain storms we had in the morning."

== Awards and rankings ==
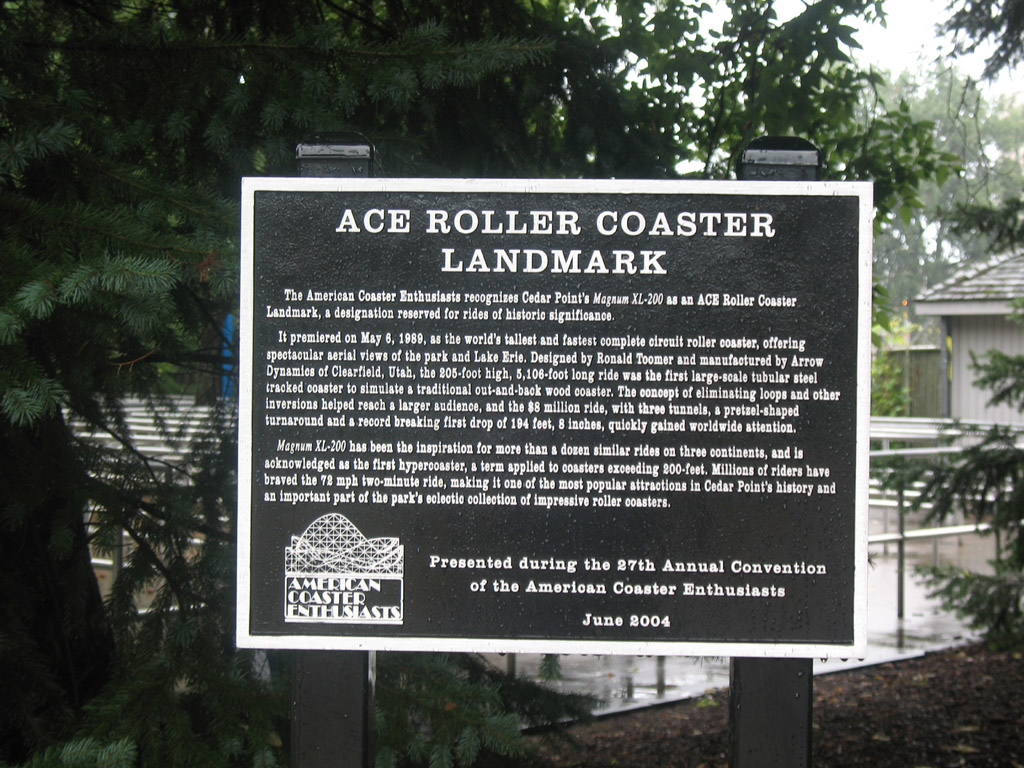
Magnum's ACE Landmark sign

Magnum XL-200 was designated an ACE Roller Coaster Landmark on June 21, 2004, at the 27th Annual Convention of the American Coaster Enthusiasts. It received the designation for inspiring more than a dozen similar rides on three continents and for being the first hypercoaster.

Golden Ticket Awards: Top steel Roller Coasters
Year									1998	1999
Ranking									1	1
Year	2000	2001	2002	2003	2004	2005	2006	2007	2008	2009
Ranking	1	3	3	4	3	3	3	5	7	9
Year	2010	2011	2012	2013	2014	2015	2016	2017	2018	2019
Ranking	8	10	8	9	13	15	15	23	14	18
Year	2020	2021	2022	2023	2024	2025	2026			
Ranking	N/A	20	25	30	36	34	38			

NAPHA Survey: Favorite Steel Roller Coaster
Year	2005	2006	2007	2008	2009	2010	2019
Ranking	2	2	3	3	2	2	2 (tie)

== Records ==
Preceded by Great American Scream Machine	World's Tallest Complete Circuit Roller Coaster; May 1989 – May 1994	Succeeded by Big One
Preceded by Shockwave	World's Longest Roller Coaster Drop; May 1989 – May 1991	Succeeded by Steel Phantom
Preceded by Bandit	World's Fastest Roller Coaster; May 1989 – May 1991	Succeeded by Steel Phantom
