= Desperado (roller coaster) =

Roller coaster in Primm, Nevada

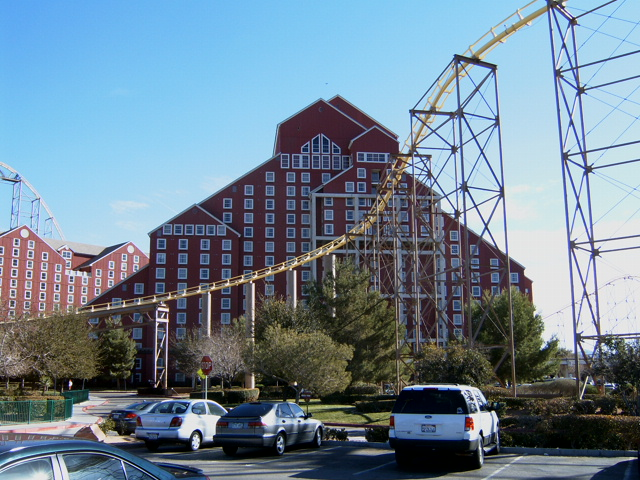

Buffalo Bill's Hotel and Casino
- Location: Buffalo Bill's Hotel and Casino
- Park section: Old Western Times
- Coordinates: 35°36′51″N 115°23′04″W
- Status: Closed
- Opening date: August 11, 1994; 31 years ago
- Closing date: February 2020; 6 years ago
- Cost: $30,000,000

General statistics
- Type: Steel
- Manufacturer: Arrow Dynamics
- Designer: Ron Toomer
- Model: Hypercoaster
- Track layout: Ron Toomer
- Lift/launch system: Chain
- Height: 209 ft (64 m)
- Drop: 225 ft (69 m)
- Length: 5,843 ft (1,781 m)
- Speed: 80 mph (130 km/h)
- Inversions: 0
- Duration: 2:43
- Max vertical angle: 60°
- Capacity: 900 riders per hour
- G-force: 4
- Height restriction: 52 in (132 cm)
- Trains: 3 trains with 5 cars. Riders are arranged 2 across in 3 rows for a total of 30 riders per train.
- Desperado at RCDB

Desperado is a steel roller coaster located at Buffalo Bill's Hotel and Casino, part of the Primm Valley Resorts complex, in Primm, Nevada, United States. Designed by Arrow Dynamics and fabricated by Intermountain Lift, Inc., Desperado opened as the tallest roller coaster in the world in 1994, which was recognized by Guinness Book of Records in 1996. The hypercoaster is ranked as one of the longest coasters in the world, featuring a track length of 5,843 feet (1,781 m). It stands 209 feet (64 m) tall with a 225-foot (69 m) drop, and the ride exerts up to 4 G's when reaching its maximum speed of 80 mph (130 km/h).

A portion of the ride runs indoors through the main area of the casino. Desperado has been closed since the COVID-19 pandemic lockdowns in February 2020. It still receives regular maintenance, and the casino has expressed intentions to eventually reopen the ride.

== History ==
Gary Primm opened a casino called Buffalo Bill's on May 14, 1994, and he wished to attract people driving on adjacent Interstate 15 to his new casino. Primm contracted Arrow Dynamics to build a highly visible roller coaster. The ride opened to the public on August 11, 1994, as one of the tallest and fastest roller coasters in the world. The ride's 209-foot-tall (64 m) lift hill was the tallest in the world, second behind only the Pepsi Max Big One at Blackpool Pleasure Beach in England that opened the same year. Its drop length of 225 feet (69 m) and top speed of 80 mph (130 km/h) were tied in the country with Kennywood's Steel Phantom, which also featured a 225-foot (69 m) drop and top speed of 80 mph (130 km/h). The Guinness Book of World Records recognized Desperado in its 1996 publication as the tallest roller coaster in the world.

For his Top Secret special that first aired on February 24, 1999, magician Lance Burton staged a death-defying escape in a stunt where he was tied to the roller coaster's track and had to break out of handcuffs in order to escape.

In February 2020, due to the onset of the COVID-19 pandemic, Buffalo Bill’s Casino was temporarily closed, along with Desperado and their log flume which closed indefinitely. The casino reopened on December 23, 2022, but Desperado remained closed. In 2023, it was reported that the roller coaster would be part of a casino-wide refurbishment, in an effort to bring back previous guests. Casino general manager Jerry West stated that the ride had been kept properly maintained and functional during the nearly three-year closure, with test runs occurring regularly. He added that the coaster will be subject to a "sign-off process" involving legal and mechanical inspections before reopening.
