= It's My Time =

It's My Time may refer to:

- It's My Time (film)
- It's My Time (Jeanie Tracy album)
- It's My Time (Tito El Bambino album)
- "It's My Time" (Jade Ewen song), the British entry in the 2009 Eurovision Song Contest
- "It's My Time" (Martina McBride song)
- "It's My Time" (Prince Royce song)
- "It's My Time", by Clint Mansell from Black Swan: Original Motion Picture Soundtrack
- "It's My Time", by The Mynah Birds
- "It's My Time", by Scorcher
- "It's My Time", by The Everly Brothers

== See also ==
- My Time (disambiguation)
