= Fujiyama (roller coaster) =

Roller coaster in Fujiyoshida, Japan

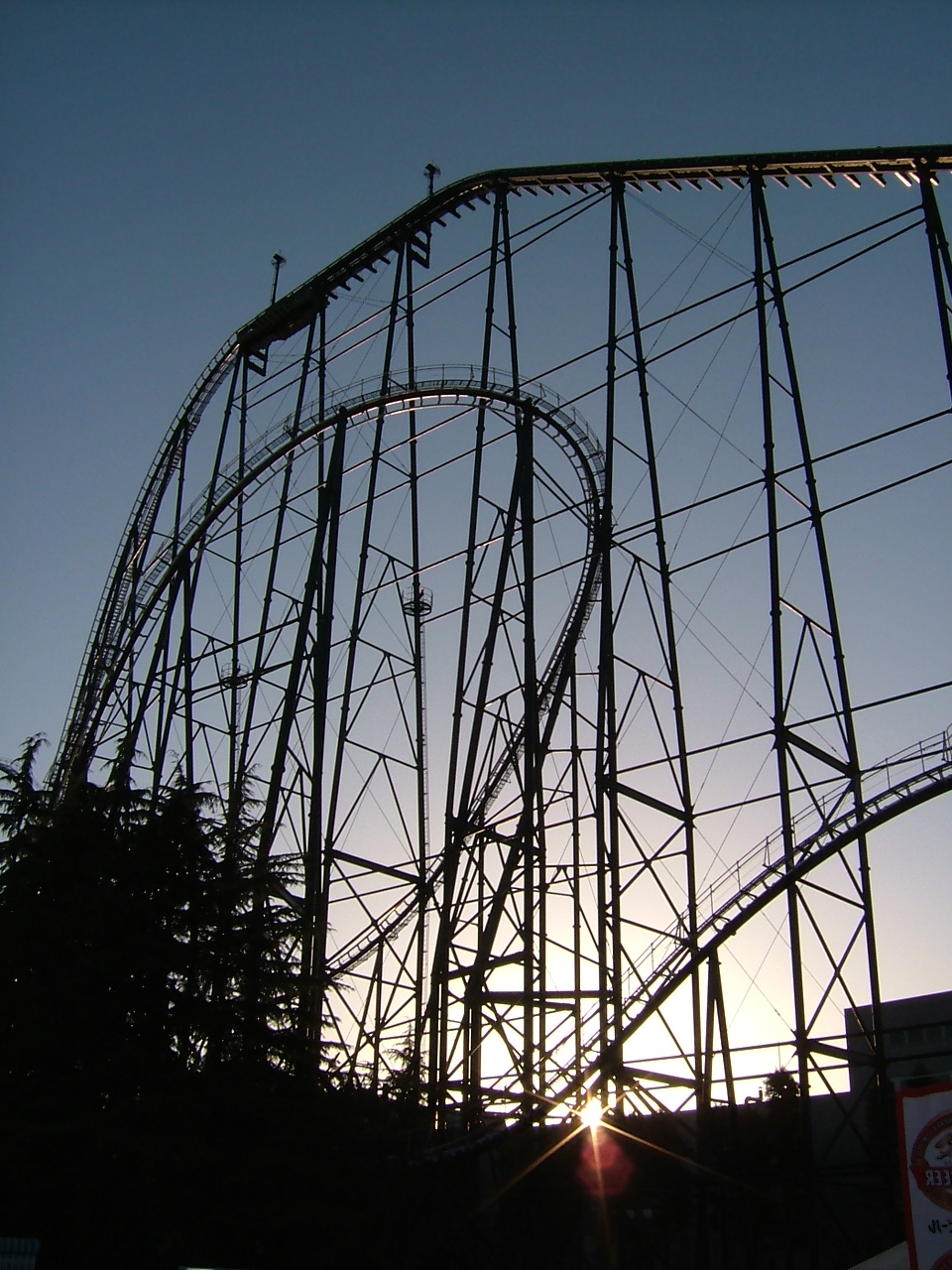
- The Fujiyama roller coaster at Fuji-Q Highland amusement park, Japan

Fuji-Q Highland
- Location: Fuji-Q Highland
- Coordinates: 35°29′09″N 138°46′37″E
- Status: Operating
- Opening date: July 1996
- Cost: 5,954,980,000 Yen ($40,000,000 USD)

General statistics
- Type: Steel
- Manufacturer: TOGO
- Designer: Morgan
- Model: Hypercoaster
- Track layout: Out and back
- Lift/launch system: Chain
- Height: 259 ft (79 m)
- Drop: 230 ft (70 m)
- Length: 6,709 ft (2,045 m)
- Speed: 81 mph (130 km/h)
- Inversions: 0
- Duration: 3:36
- Max vertical angle: 65°
- Capacity: 1,100 riders per hour
- G-force: 3.5
- Height restriction: 43.3 in (110 cm)
- Trains: 7 cars; riders arranged 2 across in 2 rows for a total of 28 riders per train
- Fujiyama at RCDB

Fujiyama (フジヤマ) is a steel roller coaster at Fuji-Q Highland, Fujiyoshida, Japan. When Fujiyama opened in July 1996, it was the world's tallest roller coaster at 259 feet (79 m), and had the largest drop in the world at 230 feet (70 m). Fujiyama was also the world's fastest roller coaster for a year of its operation, being succeeded by Tower of Terror at Dreamworld theme park in Queensland, Australia in 1997. Despite being the world's fastest roller coaster for a year, Fujiyama set no official world records for roller coaster speed. The Steel Phantom coaster at Kennywood in Pennsylvania, U.S., set the world record for speed instead.

== Name ==
Fujiyama is named after the iconic Mount Fuji, which stands to the west of Tokyo. The term Fujiyama comes from "fuji", and "yama" which means mountain. Mount Fuji is seldom referred to as "Fujiyama" in the Japanese language, but is instead more commonly referred to as "Fujisan", using the on'yomi pronunciation of the "mountain" character. The roller coaster Fujiyama is named as a play on the common foreign mistransliteration.

== Design ==
As with many Japanese roller coasters, Fujiyama has a maximum rider age of 64 years old, as well as the height restrictions typical of any roller coaster. If an unlimited ride ticket has not been purchased, it also has a separate entrance fee (2,000 yen). The layout of Fujiyama is that of a typical out-and-back roller coaster. It incorporates many of the elements that are typical of this coaster design, including a large first drop, "headchopper" elements, and a series of small "bunny hills" near the end of the coaster's course.

== Reception ==
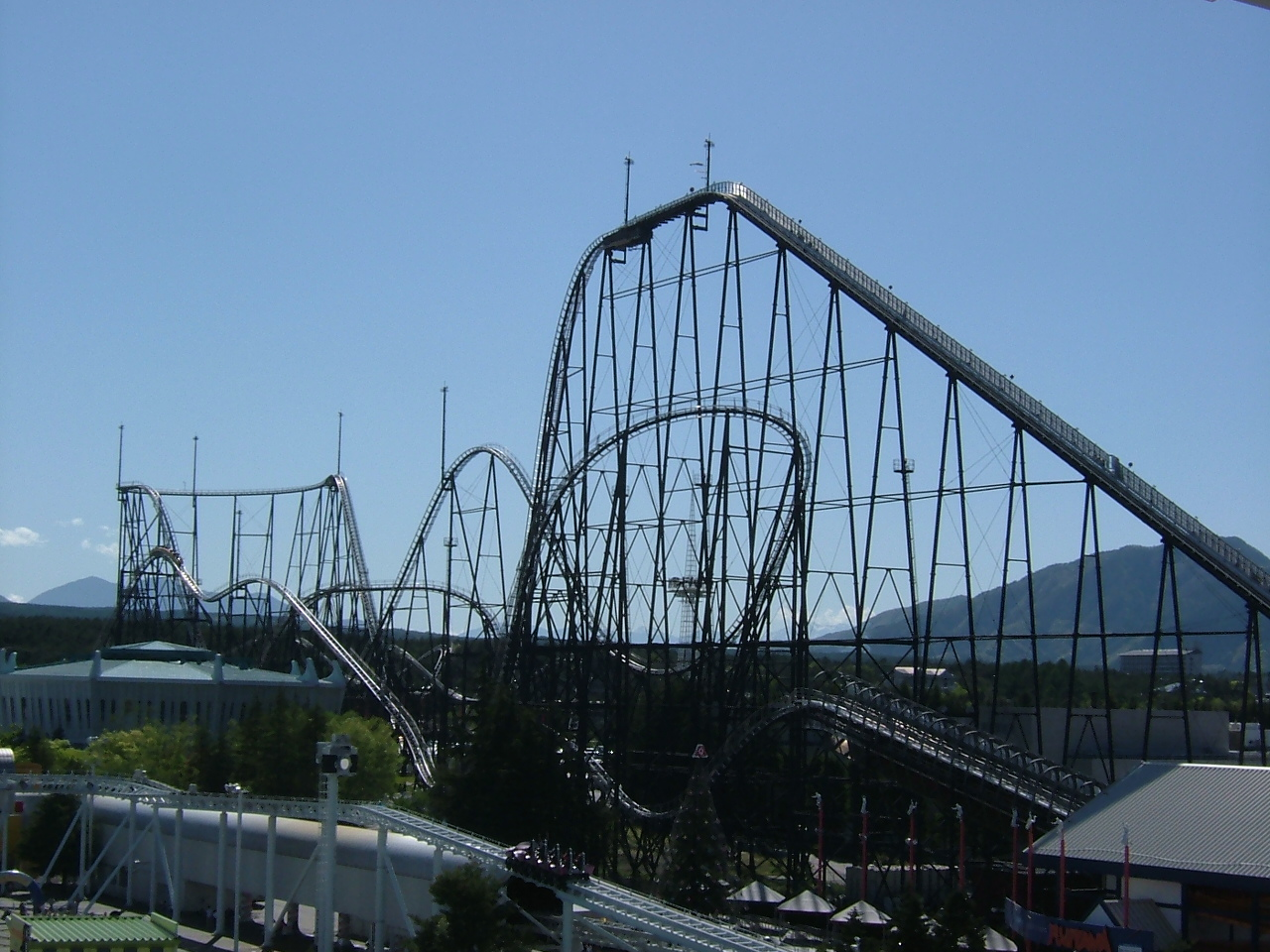
Daytime view of Fujiyama

Given its record-breaking status, Fujiyama attracted considerable attention when it opened. The ride has been rated positively by many reviewers, garnering 5 stars in Steven Urbanowicz's The Roller Coaster Lover's Companion. Fujiyama did not, however, achieve a listing amongst the top 50 steel roller coasters in Amusement Today's 2009 Golden Ticket Awards.

== In medical literature ==
Fujiyama inadvertently attracted attention in 2000 after an article was published in the journal Neurology. The article discussed the possible relationship between riding roller coasters and the occurrence of subdural hematomas. The primary case study cited by the authors was a woman who had reported severe headaches after riding several roller coasters at Fuji-Q Highland, including Fujiyama. Upon investigation, it was discovered that this woman did in fact have a subdural hematoma. Subsequent research, however, has maintained that this risk remains low and is not unique to this particular coaster.

== Records ==
Preceded by Big One	World's Tallest Closed- Circuit Roller Coaster; July 1996 – May 2000	Succeeded by Millennium Force
Preceded by Moonsault Scramble	World's Tallest Roller Coaster; July 1996 – January 1997	Succeeded by Tower of Terror
Preceded by Steel Phantom; Desperado	World's Longest Roller Coaster Drop; July 1996 – January 1997	Succeeded by Tower of Terror
Preceded by Steel Phantom	World's Fastest Closed-Circuit Roller Coaster; July 1996 – February 2000	Succeeded by Goliath
Preceded by Steel Phantom	World's Fastest Roller Coaster; July 1996 – January 1997	Succeeded by Tower of Terror
