= RP 1 =

RP 1, RP-1, RP.1, RP1, or similar terms may refer to:

- DZRB-AM, a Philippine radio station known as Radyo Pilipinas 1 or RP1 News
- RP-1, Rocket Propellant 1
- Realistic Progression 1, a mod for the space simulation game Kerbal Space Program
- RP1, retinitis pigmentosa 1 protein
- Asteroids:
  - 5580 Sharidake, or 1988 RP_{1}
  - (12728) 1991 RP_{1}
  - 12576 Oresme, or 1999 RP_{1}
- Mitsubishi RP-1, a helicopter
- Rensselaer RP-1, a crewed glider
- Radioplane RP-1, a UAV
- Ready Player One, a novel by Ernest Cline
- RP^{1}, real projective line
- RP1, a competitor classification in paraclimbing
- RP1, the developmental name for the cancer drug vusolimogene oderparepvec, marketed as Tudriqev

== See also ==
- RPI (disambiguation)
- RPL (disambiguation)
