= RPI =

RPI may refer to:

== Universities ==
- Rensselaer Polytechnic Institute, Troy, New York, US
- Richmond Professional Institute, merged into Virginia Commonwealth University

== Science and technology ==
- Raspberry Pi (RPi), single-board computers and microcontrollers by public traded Raspberry Pi Ltd.
- Reticulocyte production index, a blood test result
- Ribose-5-phosphate isomerase (Rpi), an enzyme

== Organizations ==
- Recognition Professionals International, a professional association based in the United States
- Republican Party of India
- Republican Party of Iowa

== Other ==
- Rating percentage index, in college sports
- Retail price index, UK inflation measure
- Revenue Protection Inspector, on UK public transport
- Rock progressivo italiano, Italian progressive rock

== See also ==
- RP 1 (disambiguation)
- RPL (disambiguation)
