= Moonsault Scramble =

Defunct shuttle roller coaster

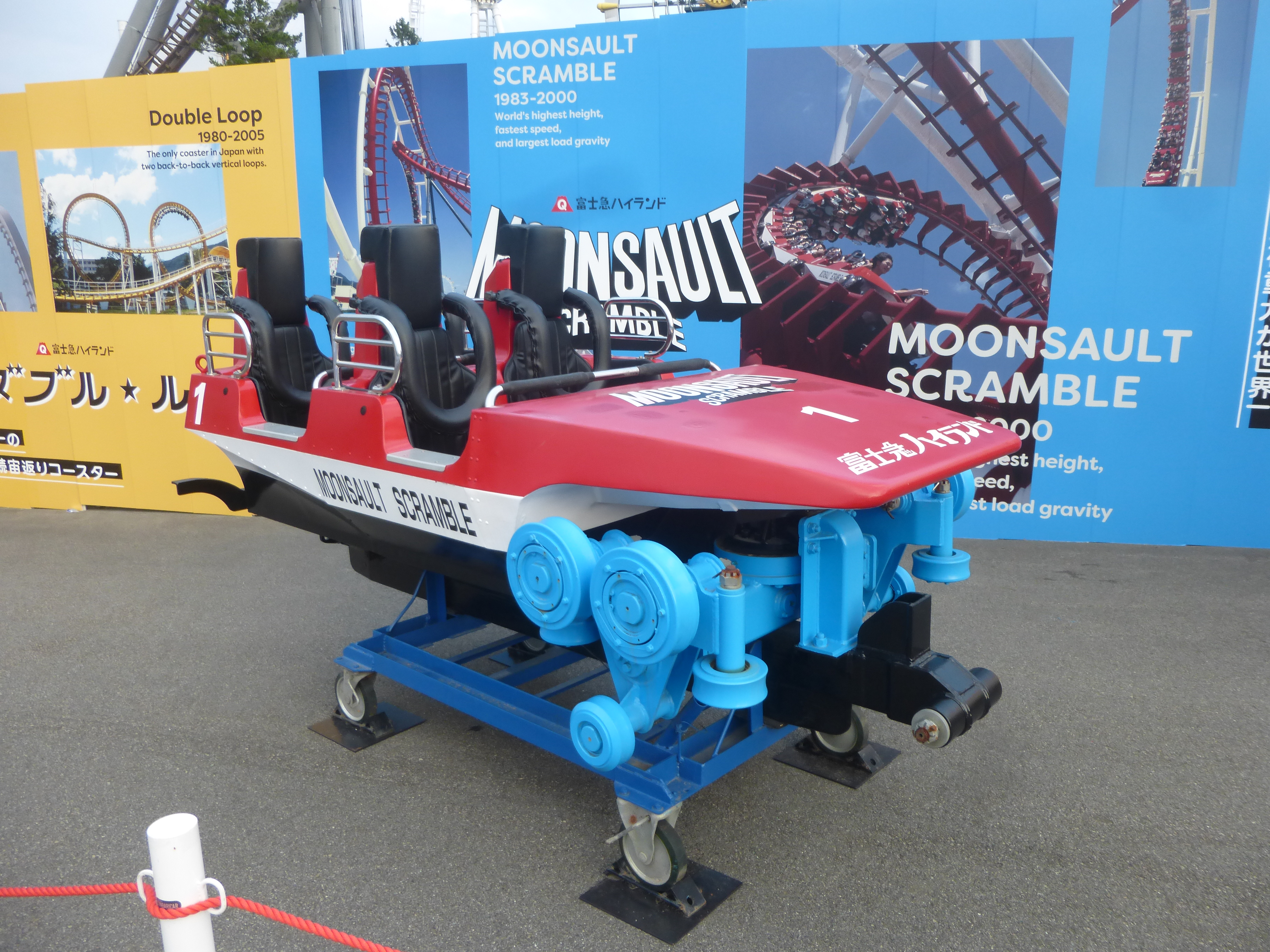
- Moonsault Scramble's first car

Fuji-Q Highland
- Location: Fuji-Q Highland
- Coordinates: 35.487°N 138.780°E
- Status: Removed
- Opening date: 24 June 1983
- Closing date: April 2000

General statistics
- Type: Steel – Shuttle
- Manufacturer: Meisho Amusement Machines
- Height: 70 m (230 ft)
- Length: 460 m (1,510 ft)
- Speed: 90 km/h (56 mph)
- Inversions: 2
- G-force: 6.2
- Trains: Single train with 7 cars; riders arranged 2 across in 2 rows for a total of 28 riders per train
- Moonsault Scramble at RCDB

Moonsault Scramble (ムーンサルト・スクランブル) was a shuttle roller coaster located at Fuji-Q Highland in Fujiyoshida, Yamanashi, Japan. Manufactured by Sanoyas Hishino Meisho, the ride opened to the public on 24 June 1983. According to the Guinness Book of Records, Moonsault Scramble was the tallest shuttle roller coaster in the world at 70 metres (230 ft) when it opened. It held the record until the opening of Fujiyama, a coaster that opened at the same park in 1996, which reached 79 metres (259 ft) in height. The coaster was removed from the park in 2000 to make way for the construction of Dodonpa, which opened in 2001.

== Ride experience ==
Moonsault Scramble was known for producing extremely high g-forces on its riders. As of 1998, it was cited by some to exert up to 6.5 Gs on its riders. It was one of only three roller coasters outside the United States to exert such extreme forces on its riders (the others being Mindbender and Dreier Looping Coaster). The pretzel knot element (comprising two inversions) that produced these high g-forces was the only such pretzel knot inversion ever implemented in a roller coaster until the opening of Banshee at Kings Island in 2014. The pretzel knot element is different from the much more common pretzel loop element.

== Height record ==
The height claims of coasters like Moonsault Scramble stirred controversy among coaster enthusiasts. Moonsault Scramble's 63-metre (207 ft) height was reportedly attributed to decorative towers that flanked the support structure, while the actual track height measured 60 metres (200 ft). According to the Sun Sentinel in 1989, the Guinness Book of World Records recognized the height as 75 metres (246 ft), but the American Coaster Enthusiasts organization refused to recognize the claim, describing it as "disappointing" since riders do not approach the maximum height or "go over the top". The Roller Coaster DataBase (RCDB) lists the overall height as 70 metres (230 ft).

| Preceded by Montezooma's Revenge | World's Tallest Roller Coaster; June 1983 – July 1996 | Succeeded by Fujiyama |
