= The Big One (roller coaster) =

Steel roller coaster at Pleasure Beach Resort

- Previously known as Pepsi Max Big One (1994–2011)
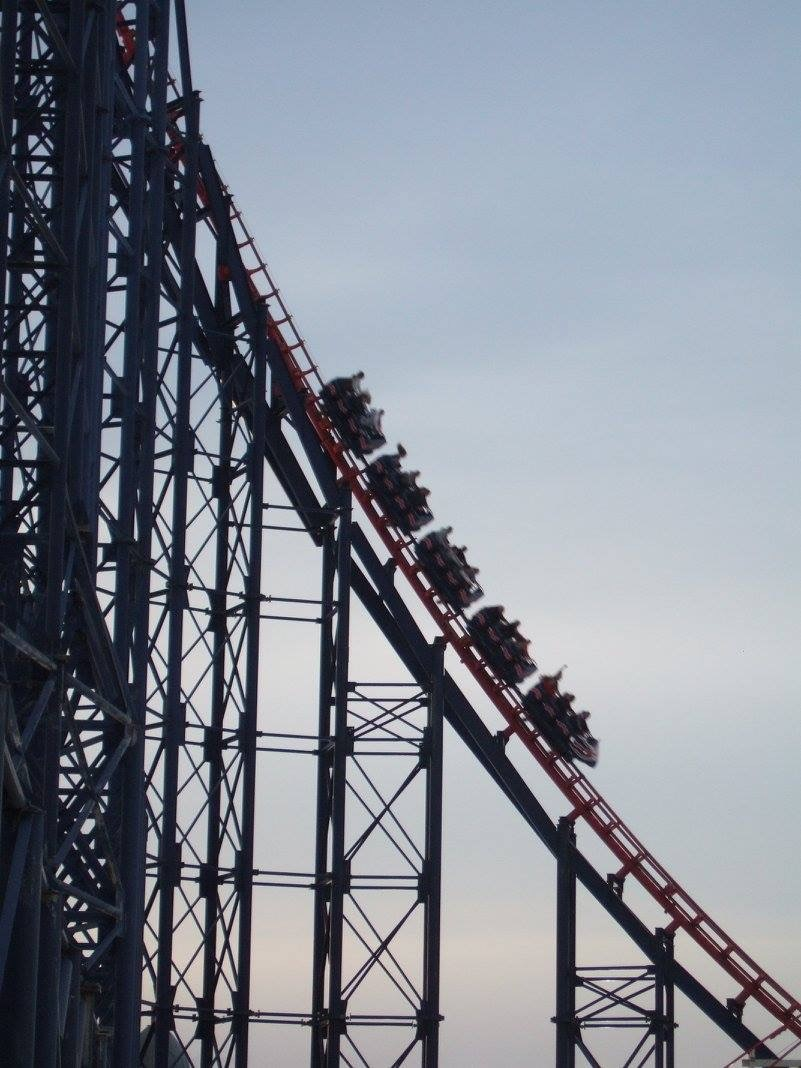

Pleasure Beach Resort
- Location: Pleasure Beach Resort
- Coordinates: 53°47′21″N 3°03′19″W
- Status: Operating
- Opening date: 28 May 1994
- Cost: £12 million

General statistics
- Type: Steel
- Manufacturer: Arrow Dynamics
- Designer: Ron Toomer
- Model: Hyper Coaster
- Lift/launch system: Chain lift hill
- Height: 213 ft (65 m)
- Drop: 205 ft (62 m)
- Length: 5,497 ft (1,675 m)
- Speed: 74 mph (119 km/h)
- Inversions: 0
- Duration: 3:00
- Max vertical angle: 65°
- Capacity: 1,700 riders per hour
- G-force: 3.5
- Height restriction: 52 in (132 cm)
- Trains: 2 trains with 5 cars; riders arranged 2 across in 3 rows for a total of 30 riders per train
- The Big One at RCDB

The Big One (formerly Pepsi Max Big One) is a steel hypercoaster at Pleasure Beach Resort (better known as Blackpool Pleasure Beach) in Blackpool, England. Designed by Ron Toomer and manufactured by Arrow Dynamics, the ride opened to the public on 28 May 1994 as the tallest roller coaster in the world, featuring a height of 65 metres (213 ft). It held the title as the tallest until Fujiyama opened in 1996.

Construction of the ride cost £12 million. The ride was sponsored by Pepsi until 2011, at which time Pepsi Max was removed from the name.

== History ==
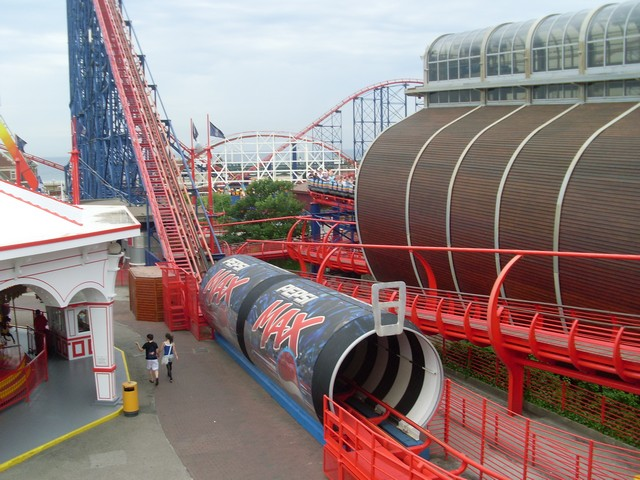
Pepsi Max can tunnel in 2009

Construction of The Big One began in 1992, headed by Arrow Dynamics with Ron Toomer as its lead designer. By the time it was completed, the total cost had reached £12 million. The tubular track and supports were airlifted from Bolton to Blackpool and stored at nearby Blackpool Airport before being brought to the park. At the beginning of the ride's construction, the south of Blackpool promenade was closed, and pieces of the structure were stored on the road adjacent to the park. The first pieces to be fitted were the large foundations that would follow on from the main supports. Once all the supports were installed, the track was added, followed by additional supports on the turnaround and the mid-course brake run.

The roller coaster opened as Pepsi Max Big One on 28 May 1994 as the tallest roller coaster in the world. Its height record was surpassed in 1996 by Fujiyama at Fuji-Q Highland in Japan. The Big One also featured one of the longest tracks in the world at the time, measuring over a mile in length at 1,675 metres (5,497 ft). The ride has top speeds of 119 km/h (74 mph), which at the time of opening ranked it second-fastest coaster in the world behind Steel Phantom at Kennywood.

Some years after its opening, the first drop and turnaround were slightly redesigned. The right turn on the drop was made noticeably wider. The turnaround was also smoothed out into a consistent curve.

In 2003, then-Formula One driver Ralph Firman rode the roller coaster with the cars replaced by a Jordan EJ11 chassis.

The ride maintained its sponsorship from Pepsi Max until 2011, when the branding was removed from the ride.

The Big One has been partially re-tracked across four closed seasons by British engineering firm Taziker. In the 2019-20 closed season, four sections of track were replaced in the section which passes through the lift hill. In 2020–21, a further 75 metres of track were replaced towards the end of the ride. In 2021-22, another 103 metres of track were replaced, from partway over Star Hill through nearby Big Dipper and into the mid-course brake run. A further 103 metres of track were replaced on dip four in 2022-23.

== Characteristics ==
The ride reaches a height of 65 metres (213 ft) and has a first drop measuring 62 metres (205 ft). The first drop has a maximum vertical angle of 65 degrees, and the coaster reaches a maximum speed of 119km/h (74 mph). Riders experience positive g-forces of up to 3.5 Gs and negative g-forces of up to 0.5 Gs. Pleasure Beach Resort advertises the ride as 72 metres (235 ft) in height, but that is the height from sea level to the top of the ride, not the true height of the ride from ground level to lift hill peak.

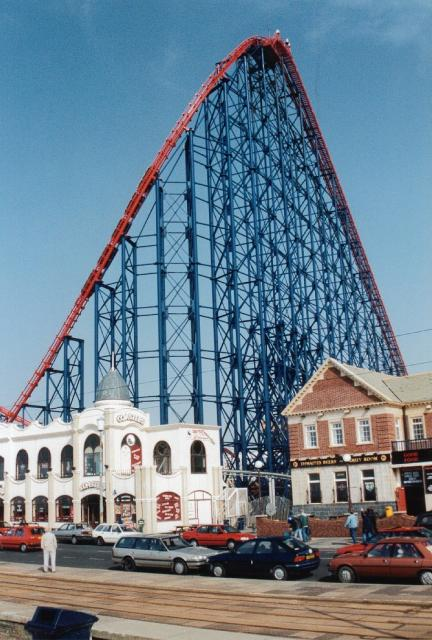
The 205-foot first drop in 1995

Each train has five cars that seat six passengers per car in three rows of two, for a total of 30 passengers per train. The ride has a maximum capacity of 1,700 riders per hour. The ride's trains feature the United Kingdom flag.

== Ride experience ==
Once riders are seated and secured, a siren sounds and the train dispatches from the station down a small dip, turning 180 degrees straight into a tunnel (which was originally themed to resemble a can of Pepsi Max).

Upon exiting the tunnel, the train enters the lift hill, which has height markers every 15 metres (50 ft) showing the rising elevation. The lift hill crosses over a portion of Icon's track. After reaching a height of 65 metres (213 ft), the train drops 62 metres (205 ft) at 65 degrees, while entering a quarter right turn. As the drop levels out, riders experience up to 3.5G and rise up a large hill with minimal airtime. The track curves slightly right into a large 180-degree, heavily banked left turn followed by three slightly banked airtime hills. After the third hill, the track crosses under Big Dipper and enters the mid-course brake run, before descending into a downward helix. The finale features an angled decline through Nickelodeon Streak into a tunnel, where an on-ride photo is taken, and a short ascent into the final brake run before returning to the station. A full ride cycle lasts approximately three minutes.

== Incidents ==
In July 1994, during the ride's inaugural season, 26 people were injured when the computerised braking system failed to completely stop a train returning to the station. The train collided with another train already inside the loading station. A second train collision, also caused by failure to brake, occurred in August 2000 and injured 16 people.

Preceded by Magnum XL-200	World's Tallest Complete Circuit Roller Coaster; May 1994 – July 1996	Succeeded by Fujiyama
