= Bandido =

Bandido is the Spanish word for a male bandit. It may refer to:

== Music ==
- Bandido (supergroup), an American supergroup with Al Hurricane as the lead singer
- Bandido (Azúcar Moreno album), 1990
  - "Bandido" (Azúcar Moreno song), Spain's entry in the Eurovision Song Contest 1990
- Bandido (Miguel Bosé album), 1984
- "Bandido" (Myke Towers and Juhn song)
- "Bandido", a 1959 song from Patricio Manns
- "Bandido", a 2003 song by Ana Bárbara

== Other uses ==
- Bandido (1956 film), an American Western
- Bandido (2004 film), a Mexican-American action film
- Bandido (video game), or Sheriff, a 1979 multi-directional shooter arcade game
- Bandido (wrestler) (born 1995), Mexican professional wrestler

== See also ==
- Bandidos, an outlaw motorcycle club
- Bandit (disambiguation)
- Bandito (disambiguation)
- Bandidas, a 2006 film starring Salma Hayek and Penélope Cruz
