= Maarten Baas =

Dutch furniture designer

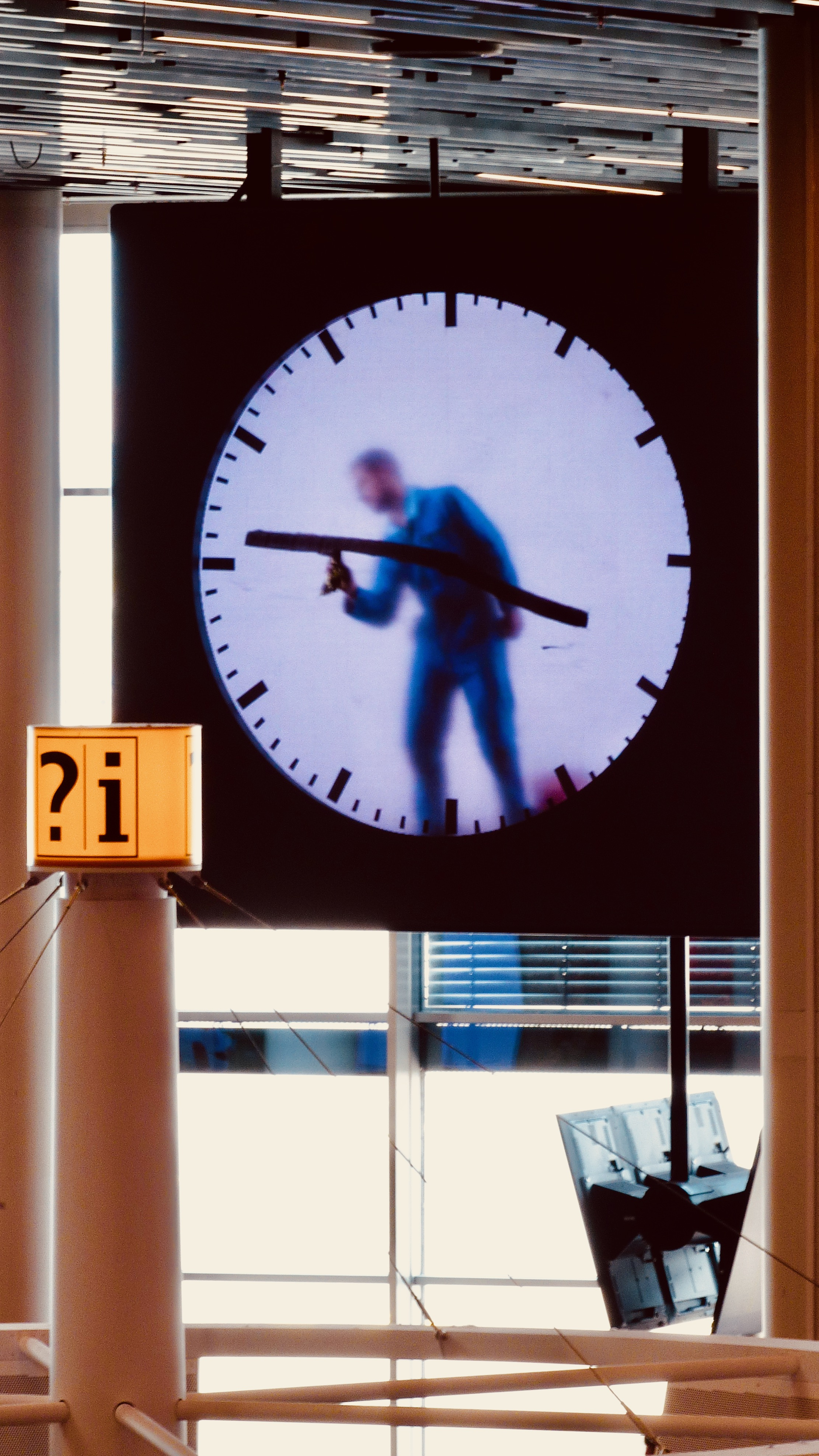
- Maarten Baas's image appearing in his installation Schiphol Clock
- Born: 19 February 1978 (age 48); Arnsberg, West Germany
- Education: Design Academy Eindhoven
- Known for: Furniture design
- Awards: Designer of the Year (2009)

Maarten Baas (Dutch pronunciation: [ˈmaːrtə(m) ˈbaːs]; born 19 February 1978) is a Dutch furniture designer. He is known for his Real Time series of clocks in which people paint the time by hand.

His career path was influenced by mentors like Jurgen Bey, colleagues like Bertjan Pot, and artists like Erwin Wurm. He attended the Design Academy Eindhoven and lives in Utrecht. His work often relates to his youth, where Baas works to "balance skilled technicality with the purity of child's spontaneity."

Above the entrance of the main public library at the Neude, Utrecht, the Netherlands, his neon lighting artwork Intellectual heritage was installed in 2023.

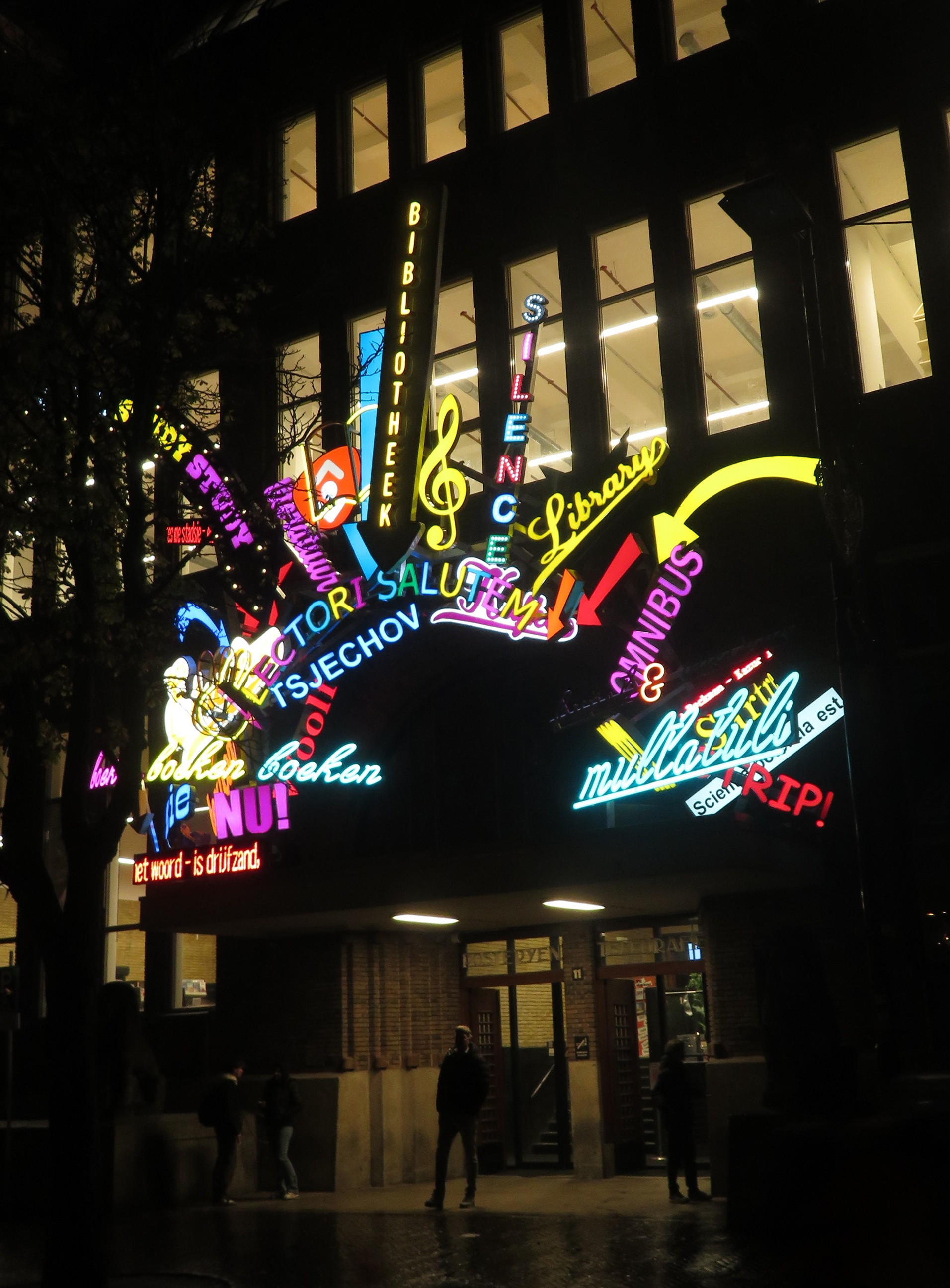
Neon lighting text artwork above the entrance of the main public library, Neude, Utrecht, the Netherlands, 2023.
