= Tyne =

Tyne may refer to:

== Geography ==
- River Tyne, England
- Port of Tyne, the commercial docks in and around the River Tyne in Tyne and Wear, England
- River Tyne, Scotland
- River Tyne, a tributary of the South Esk River, Tasmania, Australia

== People ==
- Edward Tyne (fl. 1906–1908), New Zealand rugby footballer
- George Tyne, stage name of American actor and television director Martin Yarus (1917–2008)
- Tyne Daly (born 1946), American actress
- Tyne O'Connell (born 1960), British author

== Transportation ==
- HMS Tyne, vessels of the British Royal Navy
- Tyne (1807 ship), initially a West Indiaman
- Tyne, a New Zealand Company ship that arrived in Wellington in 1841
- Rolls-Royce Tyne, a turboprop engine developed in the 1950s
- Tyne, a sea area in the British Shipping Forecast
- Tyne-class lifeboats have been operated by the Royal National Lifeboat Institution since 1982

== Other uses ==
- Reilly Tyne, Marvel Comics superhero, 'Darkdevil'.
- Tyne, a demolition diesel engine who works for the Chuggineers of Chuggington.

== See also ==
- Tyne Limestone, a geologic formation in Scotland
- Josselyn Van Tyne (1902–1957), American ornithologist and museum curator
- Tynecastle Stadium
- Tine (disambiguation)
- Tyne Valley (disambiguation)
