= Time Bandit (disambiguation) =

Time Bandit is a 1983 shoot 'em up video game.

Time Bandit or Time Bandits may also refer to:

== Arts, entertainment, media ==
- Time Bandit (character), a fictional character from the 2013 Japanese animated film Gintama: The Movie: The Final Chapter: Be Forever Yorozuya

=== Broadcast, stage, screen ===
- "Time Bandit" (documentary), an award winning 2021 documentary by Sean Cole
- "Time Bandit" (episode), a 2004 episode of the TV show All About the Andersons
- "The Time Bandit" (episode), a 1990 episode of the TV show TaleSpin; see List of TaleSpin episodes

==== Terry Gilliam's Time Bandits franchise ====
- Time Bandits (film), a 1981 film by Terry Gilliam
- Time Bandits (TV series), a 2024 TV show based on the 1981 film
- Time Bandits (comics), a 1982 comic book based on the 1981 film Time Bandits
- Time Bandits II, an unproduced 1996 script for the sequel to the 1981 film Time Bandits

=== Music ===
- "Time Bandit" (song), a 2010 song by Social Studies (band) off the LP Wind Up Wooden Heart
- "The Time Bandit" (song), a 2011 song by People Under the Stairs, off the album Highlighter (album)
- "Time Bandits" (song), a 2023 song by Angel Olsen off the EP Forever Means

==== Time Bandits band ====
- Time Bandits (band), a Dutch band formed in 1981
- Time Bandits (1982 album), a 1982 studio album by Time Bandits (band)
- Time Bandits (1984 album), a 1984 compilation album by Time Bandits (band)

== Other uses ==
- FV Time Bandit (ship), a Bering Sea fishing vessel featured on Deadliest Catch
- Time Bandit (truck), a 1998 project car, a custom Jeep built by Jp (magazine)
- Time Bandit (horse), a racehorse, winner of the 1998 Sanford Stakes and 1998 Bashford Manor Stakes

== See also ==
- Bandit (disambiguation)
- Time (disambiguation)
