= Richmond Public Library =

Richmond Public Library may refer to:

- Richmond Public Library (Canada), a public library in Richmond, British Columbia
- Richmond Public Library (United States), a public library in Richmond, Virginia

== See also ==
- Clark Memorial Library, a public library in Richmond, Rhode Island
- Richmond Memorial Library, Batavia, New York
