= Bandit (Yomiuriland) =

Steel roller coaster in Japan

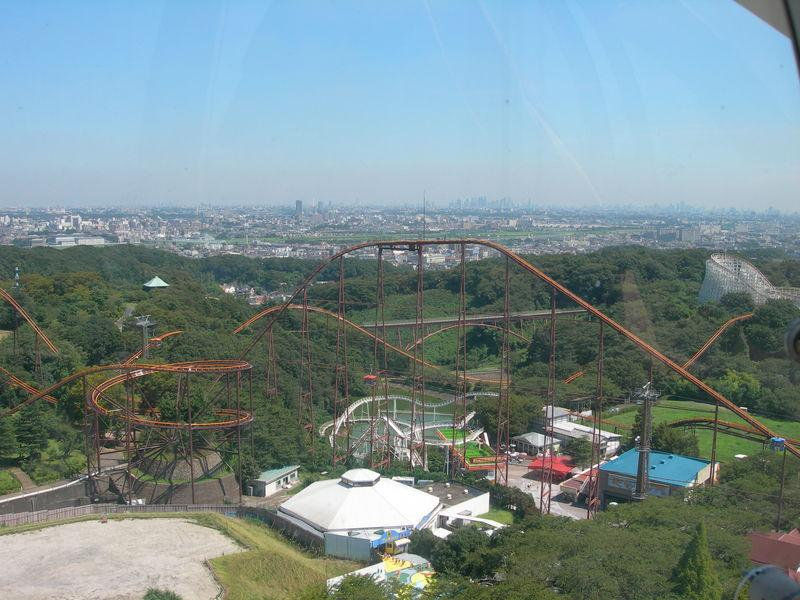
- View of Bandit from above

Yomiuriland
- Location: Yomiuriland
- Coordinates: 35°37′32″N 139°31′05″E
- Status: Operating
- Opening date: 25 March 1988

General statistics
- Type: Steel
- Manufacturer: TOGO
- Model: Super Roller Coaster
- Lift/launch system: Chain lift hill
- Height: 167.3 ft (51.0 m)
- Length: 5,118 ft (1,560 m)
- Speed: 68.3 mph (109.9 km/h)
- Inversions: 0
- Duration: 2:18
- Capacity: 1260 riders per hour
- Height restriction: 47.24 in (120 cm)
- Bandit at RCDB

Bandit (バンデット, Bandetto) is a steel roller coaster located at Yomiuriland in the city of Inagi, near Tokyo, Japan. Built in 1988 by the TOGO company, it was the fastest roller coaster in the world when it was built (taking the record from American Eagle at Six Flags Great America). It lost the record to Magnum XL-200 at Cedar Point one year later.

== Ride layout and experience ==
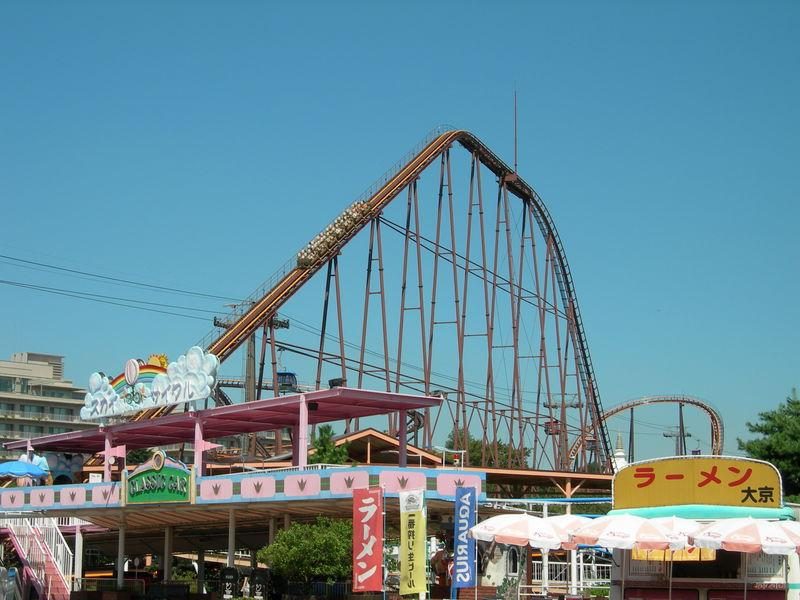
Bandit lift hill

Bandit's course is laid out as a terrain roller coaster. This means that it was custom-built to closely follow the contours of the hilly topography of Yomiuriland. Although the coaster's height is officially listed at 167.3 feet (51.0 m), the layout of the terrain means that the difference between the highest and lowest points on the ride is actually 256 feet (78 m) (also a record when it was built). When Bandit was built in 1988, it held the record of being the fastest roller coaster in the world. The ride passes through the treetops of hundreds of cherry trees. This is highlighted during the park's annual cherry blossom (sakura) festival. During the festival, Bandit is marketed as being the fastest ever "flower viewing" (hanami). The cherry blossoms around Bandit's course are also lit at night.

The majority of Bandit's course is somewhat isolated from the other rides and buildings in Yomiuriland. From the top of Bandit, riders can see views of the distant Shinjuku skyline of Tokyo. Rides on the coaster cost 1000 yen.

== Reviews ==
Bandit is the most popular roller coaster at Yomiuriland. In 2013, the coaster was identified by RocketNews24 as No. 9 of the "10 unmissable roller coasters in Japan". In 1990, roller coaster enthusiast magazine Inside Track rated Bandit as being the 24th best roller coaster in the world.

Preceded by Vortex	World's Tallest Complete-Circuit Roller Coaster; March 1988–June 1988	Succeeded by Shockwave
Preceded by American Eagle	World's Fastest Roller Coaster; March 1988–May 1989	Succeeded by Magnum XL-200
