= Ballet Palm Beach =

Ballet company in Palm Beach, Florida

Ballet Palm Beach (BPB) is the professional ballet company in Palm Beach, Florida, founded in 2001 by Colleen Smith.

== History ==
In 1993, Colleen Smith founded Ballet Palm Beach Academy under the name of The Esther Center. From teaching classes in a room above her garage, the school expanded and moved into its current location in Palm Beach Gardens in 1998. In 2001, Ruth Petrinovic, acclaimed ballet mistress, joined the staff to coach and train academy teachers under her syllabus, Revolutionary Principles of Movement (RPM). Also in that year, Smith created Florida Classical Ballet Theatre, a performing company with the advanced students from the dance school and local guest artists performing at the Eissey Campus Theatre in Palm Beach Gardens.

In 2009, Florida Classical Ballet Theatre (FCBT) hired two professional dancers full-time to dance in main stage productions with the trainees in the pre-professional program. Additionally, FCBT began international and local community ballet outreach programs, such as " Flash Ballet, " performing in unconventional venues such as shopping centers, churches, and libraries to raise the company profile and reach the under-served with ballet.

In 2013, FCBT was renamed Ballet Palm Beach, hiring additional full-time dancers and becoming the sole professional ballet company of the Palm Beaches.

== Mission ==
Ballet Palm Beach's mission is preserving the art of classical ballet, cultivating new visions in choreography, impacting the next generation through the discipline and power of dance, and enriching the community in the timeless aesthetics of a universal art form.

== Performances ==
Ballet Palm Beach has four main stage performances each season. The company's repertoire includes classics such as Giselle, Don Quixote, Cinderella, and The Nutcracker, Colleen Smith, the artistic director, has choreographed full-length, original ballets to critical acclaim such as Wonderland, Gatsby, and Snow White. In December 2017, Ballet Palm Beach premiered its original version of The Nutcracker at the Kravis Center for the Performing Arts. The company has added works from acclaimed choreographers such as Balanchine and Christopher Huggins to its repertoire.

The company has been featured in South Florida PBS series: On the Town in the Palm Beach Gardens episode and has also performed at the Annual Governor's Conference on Tourism, with Vanilla Ice.
