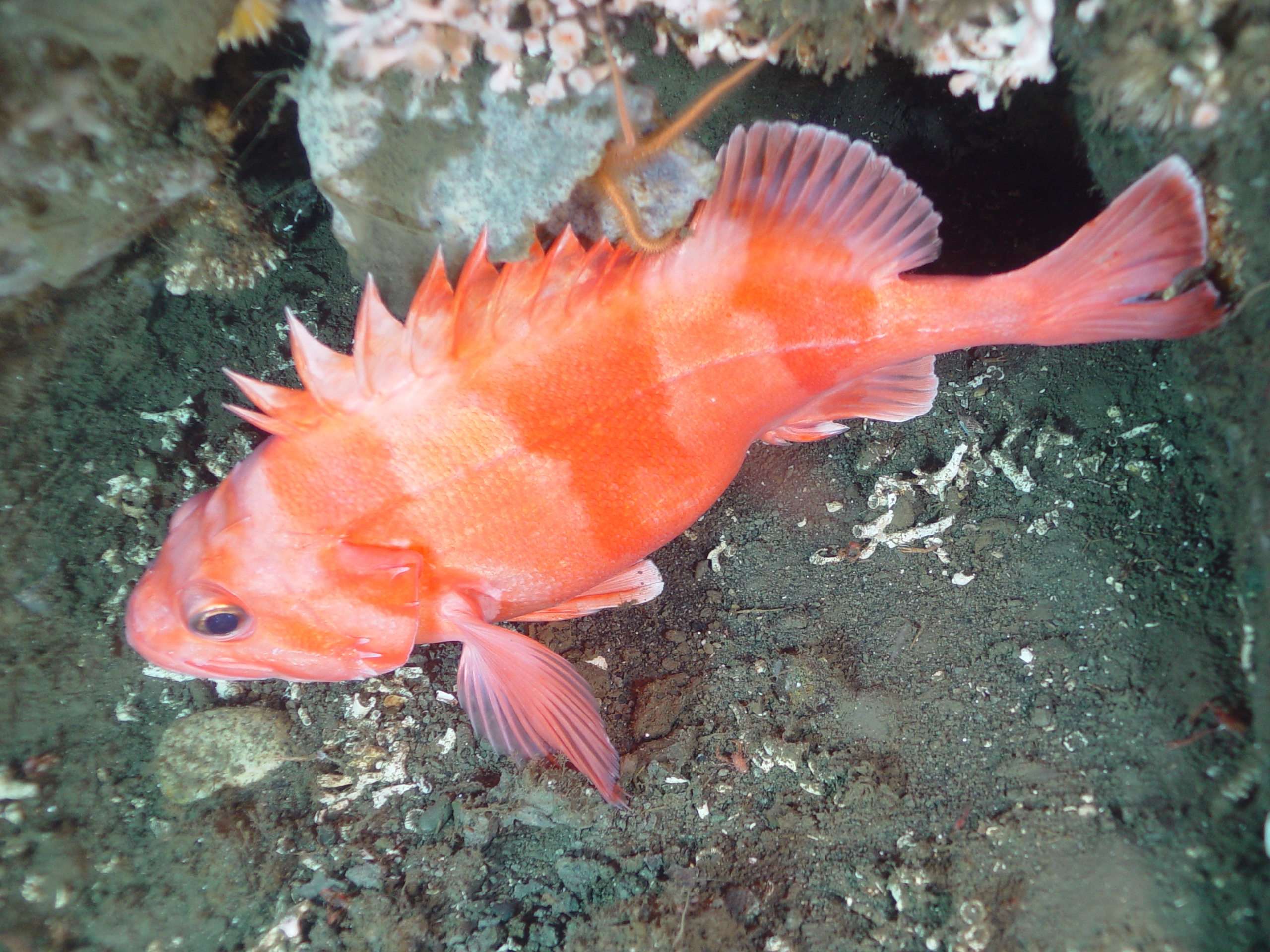

Scientific classification
- Kingdom: Animalia
- Phylum: Chordata
- Class: Actinopterygii
- Order: Perciformes
- Family: Scorpaenidae
- Genus: Sebastes
- Species: S. babcocki

Binomial name
- Sebastes babcocki (Thompson, 1915)

Synonyms
- Sebastodes babcocki Thompson, 1915

= Redbanded rockfish =

Species of fish

The redbanded rockfish (Sebastes babcocki), also known as the bandit, barber pole, flag rockfish, Spanish flag, Hollywood, convict, and canary, is a species of marine ray-finned fish belonging to the subfamily Sebastinae, the rockfishes, part of the family Scorpaenidae. It is found in the northern Pacific Ocean.

== Taxonomy ==
The redbanded rockfish was first formally described as Sebastodes babcocki in 1915 by the American ichthyologist William Francis Thompson with the type locality given as Middleton Island, Alaska. Some authorities place this species in the subgenus Rosicola. The specific name honours John Pease Babcock who was the first Commissioner of Fisheries for British Columbia, the organisation which published Francis' description.

== Description ==
The redbanded rockfish reaches up to 64 centimeters (25 in) in length. Its maximum recorded weight is 4.4 kilograms (9.7 lb), and the mean weight is roughly 1.3 kilograms (2.9 lb). It is white, pink, or red in color with four vertical red or orange bars, the first one running from the front of the dorsal fin to the pectoral fin and the fourth one at the base of the tail. These bars fade as the fish grows larger. The head is spiny. The fins may have darkened edges or a black tinge.

== Distribution and habitat ==
The redbanded rockfish is native to the northern and eastern Pacific Ocean. Its distribution extends from the Zhemchug Canyon in the Bering Sea and the Aleutians south to San Diego, California. This marine fish lives at ocean depths from 49 to 625 meters, with most between 150 and 350 meters. It can be found on soft seabed, but it also lives on muddy, pebbly, and rocky substrates, sometimes using rocks for cover.

== Biology ==
The redbanded rockfish is a long-lived fish which has been reported to reach 106 years old. The time it takes to reach maturity varies widely, often by geography. A fish off California might be mature at age 3, while an individual off British Columbia might take 19 years to mature. Size at maturity varies from 23 to 42 centimeters, with males maturing at smaller sizes than females. It is often solitary but it may join small groups. Like other rockfish, this species is viviparous. The female releases the live young between March and September across the species' range.

This fish is host to a number of parasitic copepods, including Chondracanthus pinguis, C. triventricosus, Clavella parva, Colobomatus kyphosus, Naobranchia occidentalis, Peniculus asinus, and Neobrachiella robusta.

== Fisheries ==
The redbanded rockfish has some importance in commercial fisheries, particularly in the northern half of its range. In 1995, 280 tons were caught by longline off British Columbia. Often, though, this fish is taken as bycatch during trawling operations targeting other species, such as the yelloweye rockfish (S. ruberrimus) and halibut (Hippoglossus stenolepis). Bycatch of this species in trawls off the coast of British Columbia well exceeded 1,000 tons in 1992. It has dropped below 300 tons per year since then due to better monitoring.
