= Phantom's Revenge =

Roller coaster at Kennywood

- Previously known as Steel Phantom (1991-2000)
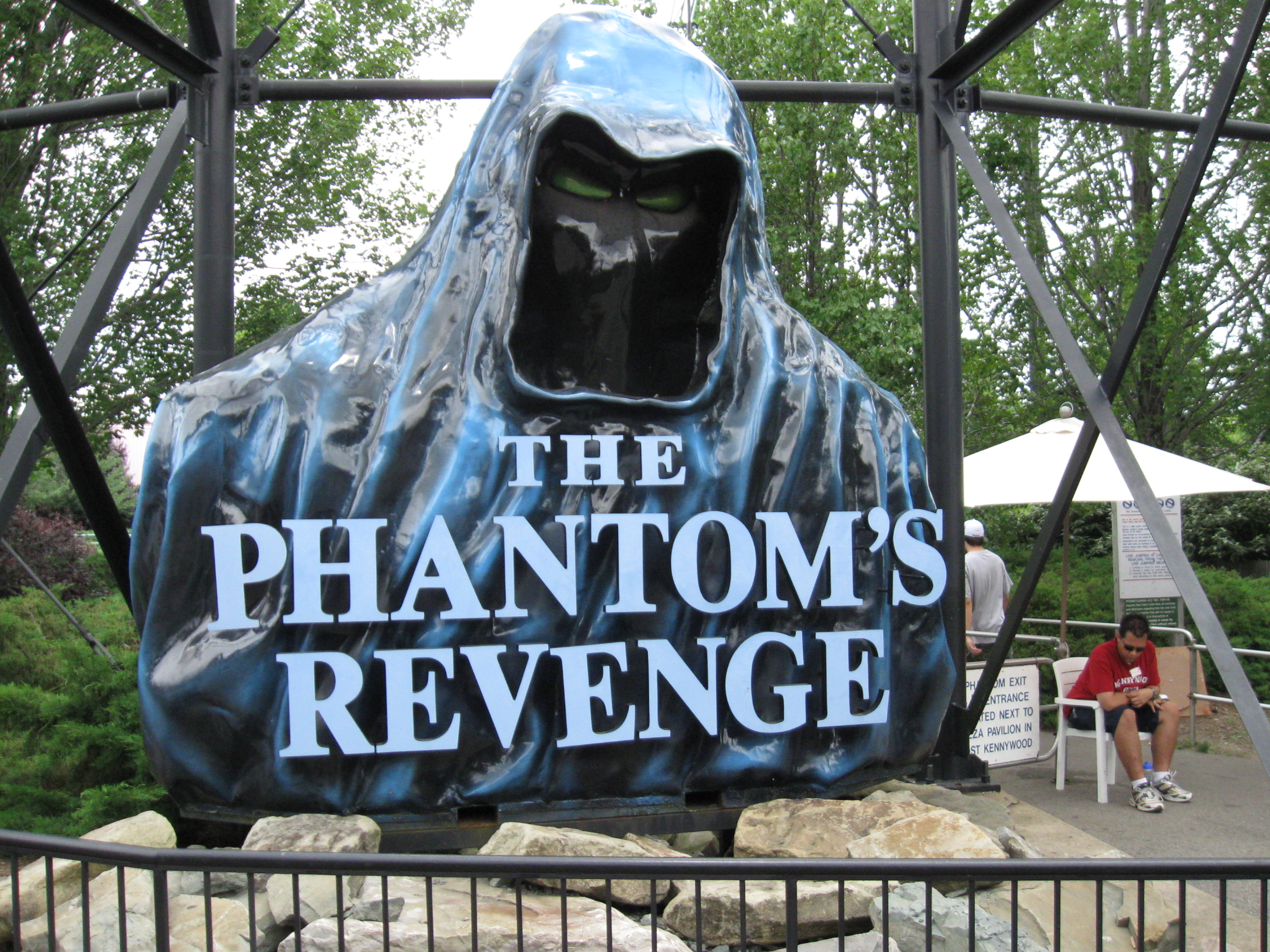

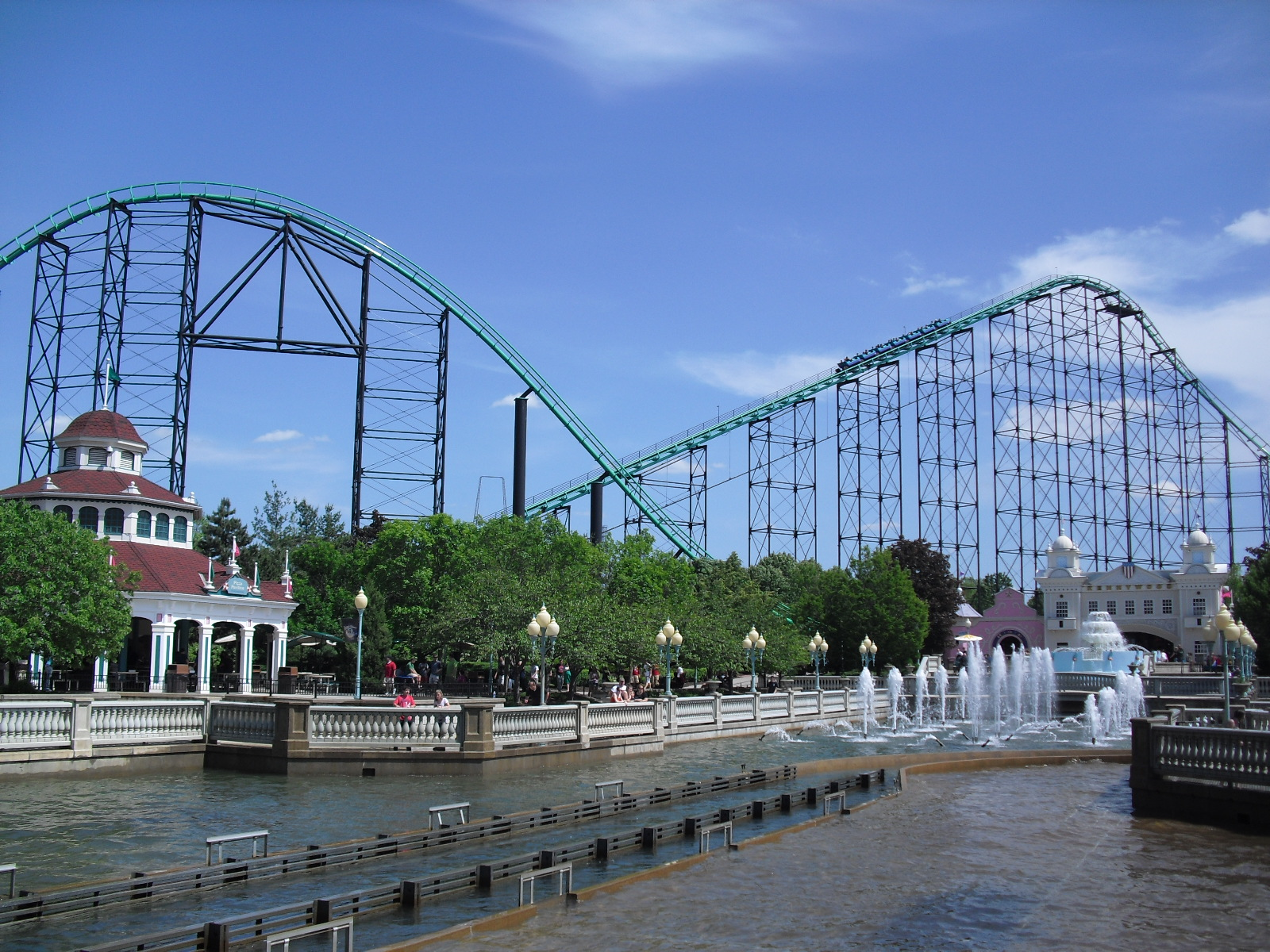

Kennywood
- Location: Kennywood
- Park section: Kenny Lane
- Coordinates: 40°23′20″N 79°51′58″W
- Status: Operating
- Opening date: May 10, 1991
- Cost: $4.6 million
- Replaced: Laser Loop

General statistics
- Type: Steel
- Manufacturer: D. H. Morgan Manufacturing
- Model: Hyper Coaster
- Track layout: Terrain Mega Coaster
- Lift/launch system: Chain lift hill
- Height: 160 ft (49 m)
- Drop: 232 ft (71 m)
- Length: 3,365 ft (1,026 m)
- Speed: 85 mph (137 km/h)
- Inversions: 0 (4 as Steel Phantom)
- Duration: 1:57
- Max vertical angle: 52°
- G-force: 3.5
- Height restriction: 48 in (122 cm)
- Trains: 2 trains with 7 cars; riders arranged 2 across in 2 rows for a total of 28 riders per train
- Speedy Pass Available
- Phantom's Revenge at RCDB

Phantom's Revenge is a steel hypercoaster located at Kennywood in West Mifflin, Pennsylvania. It originally opened as Steel Phantom in 1991, featuring the fastest speed and longest drop of any roller coaster in the world at the time. Its second drop is longer than its first, which is a unique characteristic among roller coasters. Originally manufactured by Arrow Dynamics, the ride was later modified and renovated by D. H. Morgan Manufacturing for the 2001 season when it reopened as Phantom's Revenge. The second drop and track length were both increased, and its four inversions were removed, allowing for the removal of its uncomfortable over-the-shoulder restraints.

The ride has consistently ranked among the top 50 steel roller coasters in the world in the annual Golden Ticket Awards publication from Amusement Today, occasionally ranking in the top 10. Additionally, it has frequently ranked in the top 5 of the National Amusement Park Historical Association's annual steel coaster survey. In 2025, it was named the United States' best roller coaster in a contest hosted by USA Today.

== History ==
=== Steel Phantom (1991–2000) ===
In the late 1980s, Harry Henniger, president of Kennywood Entertainment Company, sought to enter the "coaster arms race" of the time with the addition of a large steel coaster to the park. Faced with the challenge of finding the necessary space, the park settled on a design from Arrow Dynamics. The concept featured a 160-foot (49 m) lift hill with a world record-breaking 228-foot (69 m) drop, surpassing the previous 194.7-foot (59.3 m) record set two years earlier by Magnum XL-200 at Cedar Point. With a top speed of 80 mph (130 km/h), it was also set to become the world's fastest. It would be the second hypercoaster ever built.

Kennywood unveiled plans for the new ride, dubbed Steel Phantom, on July 27, 1990. Steel Phantom was built on the former site of Laser Loop, a Shuttle Loop coaster removed after the 1990 season. It reused Laser Loop's station building.

Construction of Steel Phantom began during Labor Day weekend in early September 1990. It was set to open on May 4, 1991, but this was ultimately delayed six days to May 10. When it opened, it set new records in drop height and speed, in addition to featuring four inversions.

While the coaster was initially well-received and frequently ranked high in contests regarding coasters, riders often complained of neck strain and excessive headbanging through its inversions. Shortly after its debut, engineers found that the train would reach speeds exceeding specifications. The ride was closed for over a week so trim brakes could be installed prior to the inversions where the injuries were occurring.

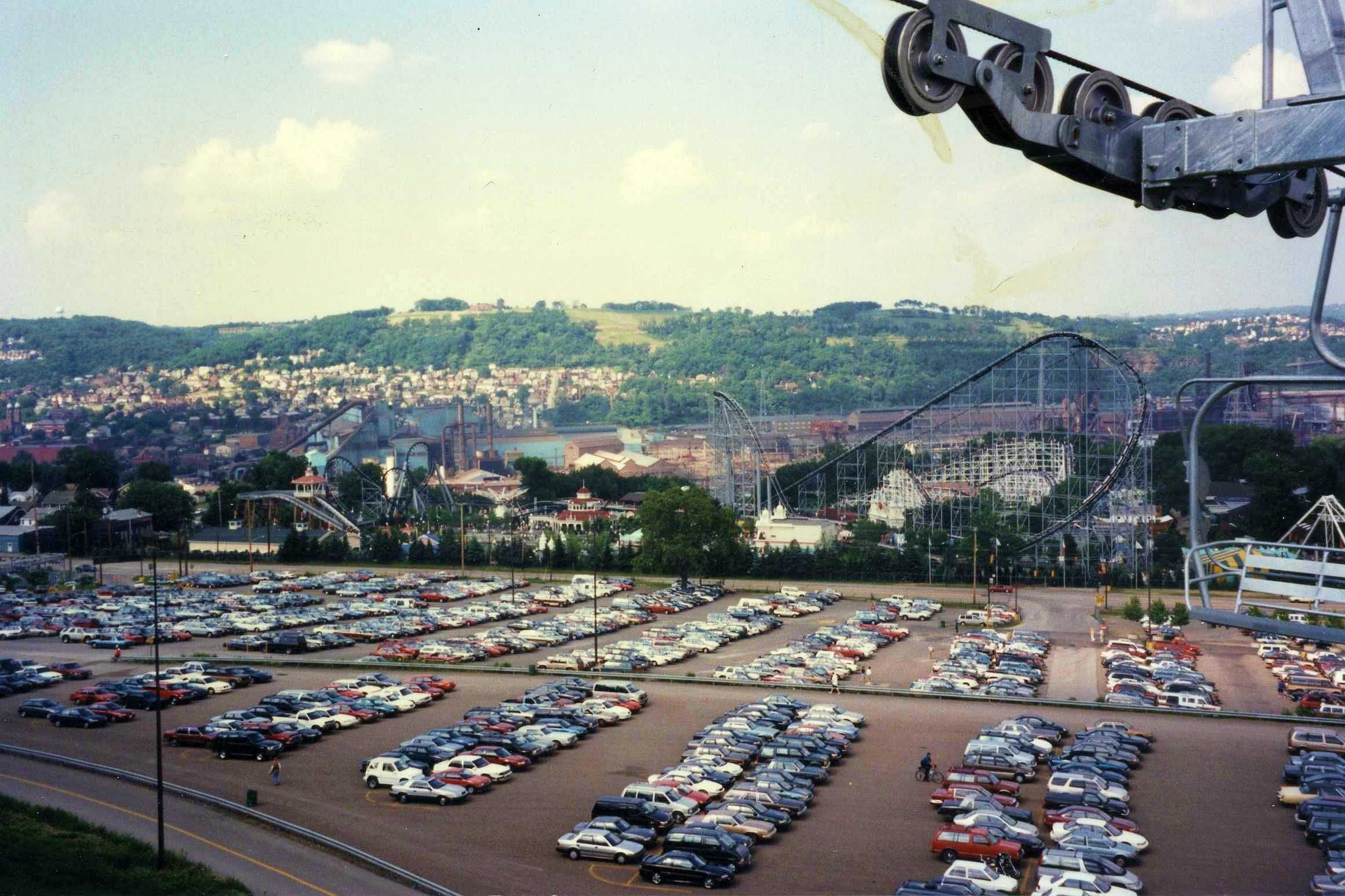
Steel Phantom in 1996

=== Phantom's Revenge (2001–present) ===
On March 5, 2000, Kennywood announced that they would dismantle Steel Phantom. A replacement for Steel Phantom was not announced at the time. "Just about anything is on the table," said Kennywood spokeswoman Mary Lou Rosemeyer. After the decision to remove Steel Phantom was announced, the park received many complaints about the decision. Kennywood ultimately decided to keep the roller coaster but make modifications to it.

On August 10, 2000, Kennywood announced that Steel Phantom would be transformed into Phantom's Revenge for the 2001 season. After the ride closed on Labor Day weekend in 2000, Steel Phantom underwent extensive changes by D. H. Morgan Manufacturing, most notably the removal of all of its inversions. The modified coaster reopened as Phantom's Revenge on May 19, 2001.

The coaster operated with one train in its first season. In 2002, magnetic brakes were added to the ride so a second train could be used. Because of the modifications, both D.H. Morgan Manufacturing-style and Arrow Dynamics-style track are present on the ride today. A short theme tune used in television commercials for the attraction was composed by Jim DiSpirito, former member of Pittsburgh-based rock band Rusted Root.

Kennywood hosted an online poll in September 2021, asking fans to decide whether Phantom's Revenge should be repainted teal or purple. Nearly 10,000 people participated in the poll, ultimately voting to repaint the track purple. The repainting took place in October 2021. In 2026, the ride received numerous upgrades and renovations to celebrate its 25th anniversary, including airgates in the station, updated train decals and colors, and audio effects throughout the ride.

== Characteristics ==
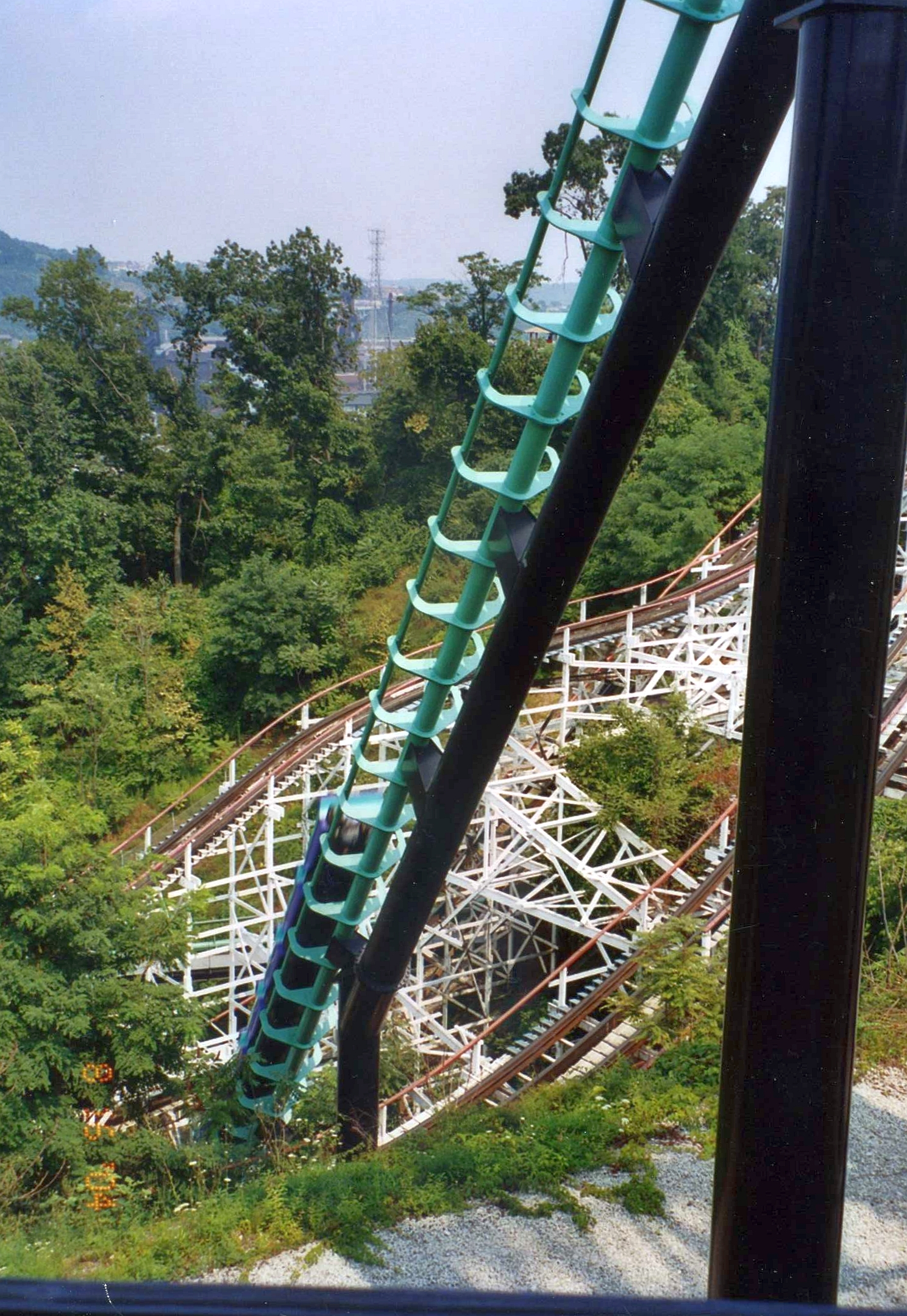
The second drop of Phantom's Revenge in 2004

The terrain coaster layout is built to take advantage of the natural elevation changes provided by the park's hilly terrain. Unlike most roller coasters, the ride's second drop is longer than its first, and its transformation to Phantom's Revenge in 2001 increased its drop length, track length, and top speeds by small margins.

=== Ride experience ===
==== Steel Phantom (1991–2000) ====
Upon dispatch from the station, the train made a slight turn to the right, climbing the 160-foot (49 m) chain lift hill. After ascending the lift hill, it went down a banked drop to the right into a section of straight track. The train ascended a second hill that turned slightly to the right, and then dropped 225 feet (69 m) through Thunderbolt's structure, reaching a top speed of 80 miles per hour (130 km/h). The train made a U-turn to the left at the bottom of the ravine, before climbing another incline into a set of trim brakes before entering a vertical loop. After the loop, the train immediately traversed a boomerang, an element which turned riders upside down twice. The train then made a right turn into a corkscrew, the fourth and final inversion. Following this, the train entered a banked right turn before passing under the corkscrew to ascend into the final brake run. One cycle of the ride took approximately 2 minutes and 15 seconds.

==== Phantom's Revenge (2001–present) ====
Upon dispatch from the station, the train makes a slight turn to the right before climbing the 160-foot (49 m) chain lift hill. After cresting the lift hill, the train drops to the right, reaching a speed of 60 miles per hour (97 km/h). Riders then enter a straightaway before climbing a second hill which turns to the right and drops 232 feet (71 m), reaching a top speed of 85 miles per hour (137 km/h). The train then makes a 280-degree turn, passing back under Thunderbolt's structure. Next, the train circles around the Turtle ride before traveling back under the second drop through an airtime hill. Riders then make a turn to the left, passing under the ride's brake run and entering a second airtime hill. The train then enters a 180-degree curve, traversing a final airtime hill and entering the brake run. One cycle of the ride takes approximately 1 minute and 57 seconds.

As seen in earlier digital models, the ride was originally meant to feature a double-up element instead of the straightaway found between the first and second drops, as well as a longer tunnel after the turnaround.

=== Trains ===
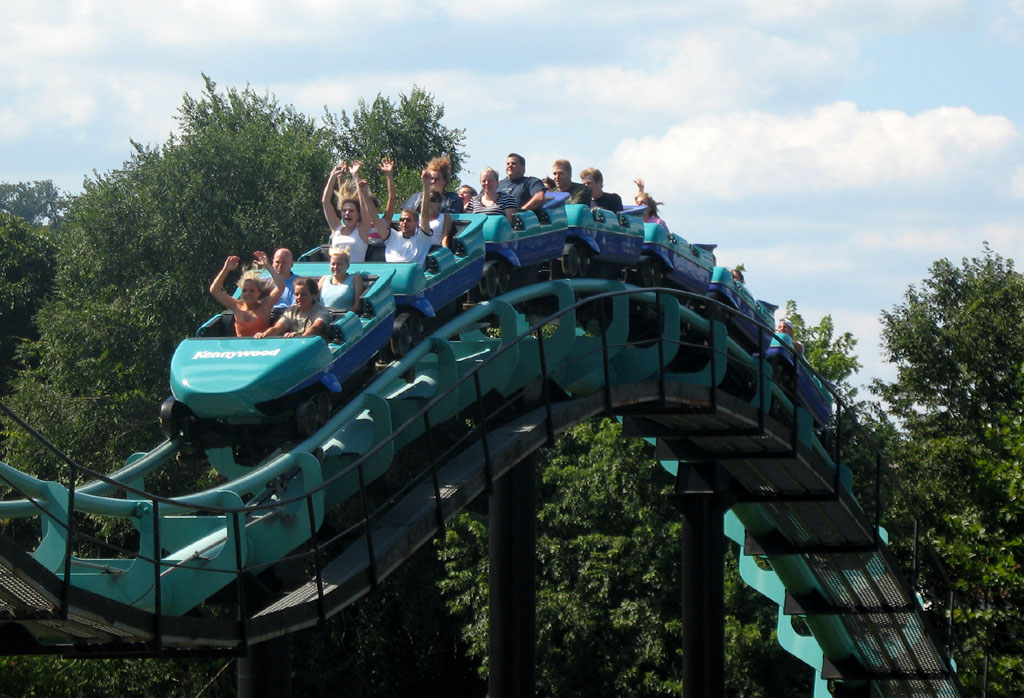
The green train on an airtime hill

As Steel Phantom, the ride had two trains; one painted purple with yellow stripes, and one yellow with purple stripes. Each train featured the Kennywood logo on the lead car. Both trains had seven cars that seated two riders in two rows, making for a total of 28 riders per train. The trains were the same type used on all other Arrow Dynamics looping coasters.

When the ride was renovated, the trains were also updated. The train's chassis, which were built by Arrow Dynamics, were kept, but D. H. Morgan Manufacturing upgraded the chassis with new, aerodynamic fiberglass bodies. The over-shoulder-restraints were also replaced with lap bars and seatbelts. Like its predecessor, Phantom's Revenge operates with two seven-car, 28 passenger trains; one teal and one purple. A unique lap bar restraint system had to be designed during the process of modification due to the utilization of the original chassis, which were unable to accommodate a traditional floor-mounted lap bar system. Instead, the lap bars on Phantom's Revenge are mounted to the outer side of the seats and lower from beside the rider.

Originally, each train had both purple and teal paint, with the top half of the train being one color and the bottom half being the other. The front car of each train had the Kennywood logo painted on it in white. In 2014, the trains received new bodies identical to the old ones, though they featured new paint jobs. Each train was colored solid teal or solid purple, with the ride's logo on the lead cars. In celebration of the ride's 25th anniversary in 2026, the cars of the trains were updated with alternating purple and teal colors.

=== Track ===
Phantom's Revenge's steel track is 3,365 feet (1,026 m) in length, and the height of the lift hill is approximately 160 feet (49 m). Before the renovation, the length was 3,000 feet (910 m), and the lift hill's height was the same. The second drop on Phantom's Revenge is 232 feet (71 m), seven feet longer than the original second drop on Steel Phantom, which was 225 feet (69 m).

The track was originally manufactured by Arrow Dynamics. After the renovation, D. H. Morgan Manufacturing replaced the majority of the track. Though the ride initially opened in 2001 with many portions of Arrow Dynamics track still in use, much of it has since been replaced, and today, the only original Arrow Dynamics track remaining on the ride is in the lift hill, the station, the brake run, and the transfer track. The track in the station and on the transfer track was not repainted with the ride's renovation, and still features the black paint of Steel Phantom.

The first iteration of the ride featured black tracks with gray supports. When it was modified, the track was painted green, and the supports were painted black. After the 2021 season, the track was repainted purple according to the results of a poll hosted online.

== Statistical comparison ==
Statistic	Steel Phantom	Phantom's Revenge
Operating years	May 10, 1991 – September 4, 2000	May 19, 2001 – present
Manufacturer	Arrow Dynamics	D. H. Morgan Manufacturing
Height	160 feet (49 m)	160 feet (49 m)
Drop	225 feet (69 m)	232 feet (71 m)
Length	3,000 feet (910 m)	3,365 feet (1,026 m)
Speed	80 miles per hour (130 km/h)	85 miles per hour (137 km/h)
Duration	2:15	1:57
Inversions	4	0
Restraints	Over-the-shoulder harness	Lap bar and seatbelt
Height restriction	52 in (130 cm)	48 in (120 cm)

== Reception and awards ==
The original Steel Phantom was initially well-received, but it was later criticized for its roughness, mainly due to its speed through its inversions and its unpopular over-the-shoulder restraints. Following its 2001 conversion, Phantom's Revenge received near-universal acclaim, being praised for its airtime moments, improved ride experience, smoothness, and for maintaining the worthwhile portions of its predecessor.

Phantom's Revenge regularly ranks highly in the Golden Ticket Awards hosted by Amusement Today. It also makes common appearances in the National Amusement Park Historical Association's (NAPHA) annual steel coaster survey. In 2025, it was named the United States' best roller coaster in a contest hosted by USA Today.

Golden Ticket Awards: Top steel Roller Coasters
Year									1998	1999
Ranking									11	11
Year	2000	2001	2002	2003	2004	2005	2006	2007	2008	2009
Ranking	19	15	7	8	8	8	7	7	8	8
Year	2010	2011	2012	2013	2014	2015	2016	2017	2018	2019
Ranking	9	5	11	13	11	14	10	12	13	12
Year	2020	2021	2022	2023	2024	2025	2026			
Ranking	N/A	15	13	12	15	11	16			

NAPHA Survey: Favorite Steel Roller Coaster
Year	2005	2006	2007	2009	2010	2011	2012	2013	2014	2015	2016	2017	2018	2019
Ranking	4 (Note: Tied with Nitro at Six Flags Great Adventure.)	3	4	3	3	2	2	2	2	2	2	2	1	1

== Notes ==
Preceded by Magnum XL-200	World's longest roller coaster drop May 1991–July 1996	Succeeded by Fujiyama
Preceded by Magnum XL-200	World's fastest roller coaster May 1991–July 1996	Succeeded by Fujiyama
