= Tyne Valley =

Tyne Valley may refer to:

- Tyne Valley, Prince Edward Island, Canada
- River Tyne in Northern England
  - The areas on the banks of the River Tyne to the west of Newcastle, roughly corresponding to Tynedale
  - The Tyne Valley line, a railway line serving the area
