= Timescape (disambiguation) =

Timescape is a 1980 science fiction novel by Gregory Benford.

Timescape may also refer to:

- Timescape Books, a short lived imprint of Pocket Books, named after the Benford novel
- "Timescape" (Star Trek: The Next Generation), an episode from the sixth season of the television series Star Trek: The Next Generation
- Timescape (1992 film), an American science fiction film directed by David Twohy
- Timescape (2022 film), a Canadian action-adventure science fiction film
- Project Timescape, education center at the Wittenham Clumps, England
- Inhomogeneous cosmology § Timescape cosmology, a cosmological model
