= TIME Hotels Management =

- Company type: Private
- Industry: Hospitality & Tourism
- Founded: February 29, 2012; 14 years ago in Dubai, United Arab Emirates
- Founder: Group of International Hotelier
- Headquarters: Dubai, United Arab Emirates
- Area served: Middle East, North Africa
- Key people: Chief Executive Officer, Mohamed Awadalla
- Website: timehotels.com

TIME Hotels Management is a UAE-based hotel management company founded in 2012. It is active across the Middle East and North Africa. It has seventeen properties across the United Arab Emirates, Qatar, Saudi Arabia, Morocco and Egypt.

== Background ==
TIME Hotels has four divisions: TIME Hotels & Resorts, TIME Hotel Apartments, TIME Express Hotels, and TIME Residence Properties. Headquartered in Dubai, United Arab Emirates, TIME Hotels was founded in 2012 by international hoteliers and hospitality professionals. The group was led by Mohamed Awadalla.

The group has since launched a diverse selection of destinations, including TIME Asma Hotel, the region's first female-run hotel, which opened to the public in 2021. The company initially launched six properties in Dubai and Sharjah, UAE, and is now expanding into Saudi Arabia, Qatar, Egypt, Morocco and Sudan.

== History ==
TIME Hotel Group has four major brands: TIME Hotels and Resorts, TIME Hotel Apartments, TIME Express Hotels, and TIME Residence.

- TIME ASMA Hotel, Dubai, UAE: 10 June 2021
- TIME Grand Plaza Hotel, Dubai, UAE: November 2010
- TIME Onyx Hotel Apartments, Dubai, UAE: Dec. 12, 2020
- TIME Moonstone Hotel Apartments, Fujairah, UAE: May 1, 2022
- TIME Ruby Hotel Apartments, Sharjah, UAE: 20 July 2009
- TIME Express Hotel, Sharjah, UAE: 20th January, 2020
- TIME Dammam Residence, Dammam, Saudi Arabia: 21 March 2019
- TIME Muruj Hotel Aparmtens, Riyadh, Saudi Arabia:14th January,2022
- TIME Oak Hotel & Suites, Dubai, UAE: 20 October 2008
- TIME Coral Nuweiba Resort, Sinai, Egypt: 1st January, 2022
- TIME Rako Hotel, Doha, Qatar: 16 February 2018
- TIME Ruba Hotel & Suites, Makkah, KSA:

TIME Hotel and Resorts cater to both business and leisure travel and has six locations, including TIME Oak Hotel & Suites in Dubai, UAE; TIME Coral Nuweiba Resort in Egypt; TIME Grand Plaza Hotel at the Dubai Airport, UAE; TIME Asma Hotel in Dubai, UAE; and TIME Rako Hotel in Doha, Qatar.

TIME Hotel Apartments currently has five locations, including two hotel apartments in Sharjah, UAE, two in Saudi Arabia, and one in Dubai.

TIME Express Hotels Al Khan has fifty-five rooms in Sharjah, UAE and is a lower-cost hotel.

TIME Residence has five apartment properties, including Crown TIME Residence, Barsha Heights, Dubai, UAE; Sand TIME Residence, Sharjah, UAE; Platinum TIME Residence, Fujairah, UAE; Palm 1 & 2 TIME Residence, Ajman, UAE; and Al Sagr Plaza TIME Residence, UAE.
