= My Time =

My Time may refer to:

== Music ==
- My Time (album), by Boz Scaggs, or its title track
- My Time, by British-Indian musician Manni Sandhu, 2012

=== Songs ===
- "My Time" (Fabolous song), 2009
- "My Time", by Jungkook of BTS, from the album Map of the Soul: 7, 2020
- "My Time", by The Psychedelic Furs, from the album Mirror Moves, 1984
- "My Time", by Jim Johnston and Chris Warren, the entrance song of professional wrestler Triple H, from the album WWF The Music, Vol. 4, 1999
- "My Time", by Calum Bowen, from the album Pale Machine (2013) and the video game Omori (2020)
- "My Time", by Yeat, from the album ADL, 2026

== See also ==
- MyTime, a software company based in San Francisco, California, U.S.
- MyTime Media, a British media company co-founded by Peter Harkness
- Time (disambiguation)
- Wasting My Time (disambiguation)
