= Real Time (art series) =

Art installation series by Maarten Baas

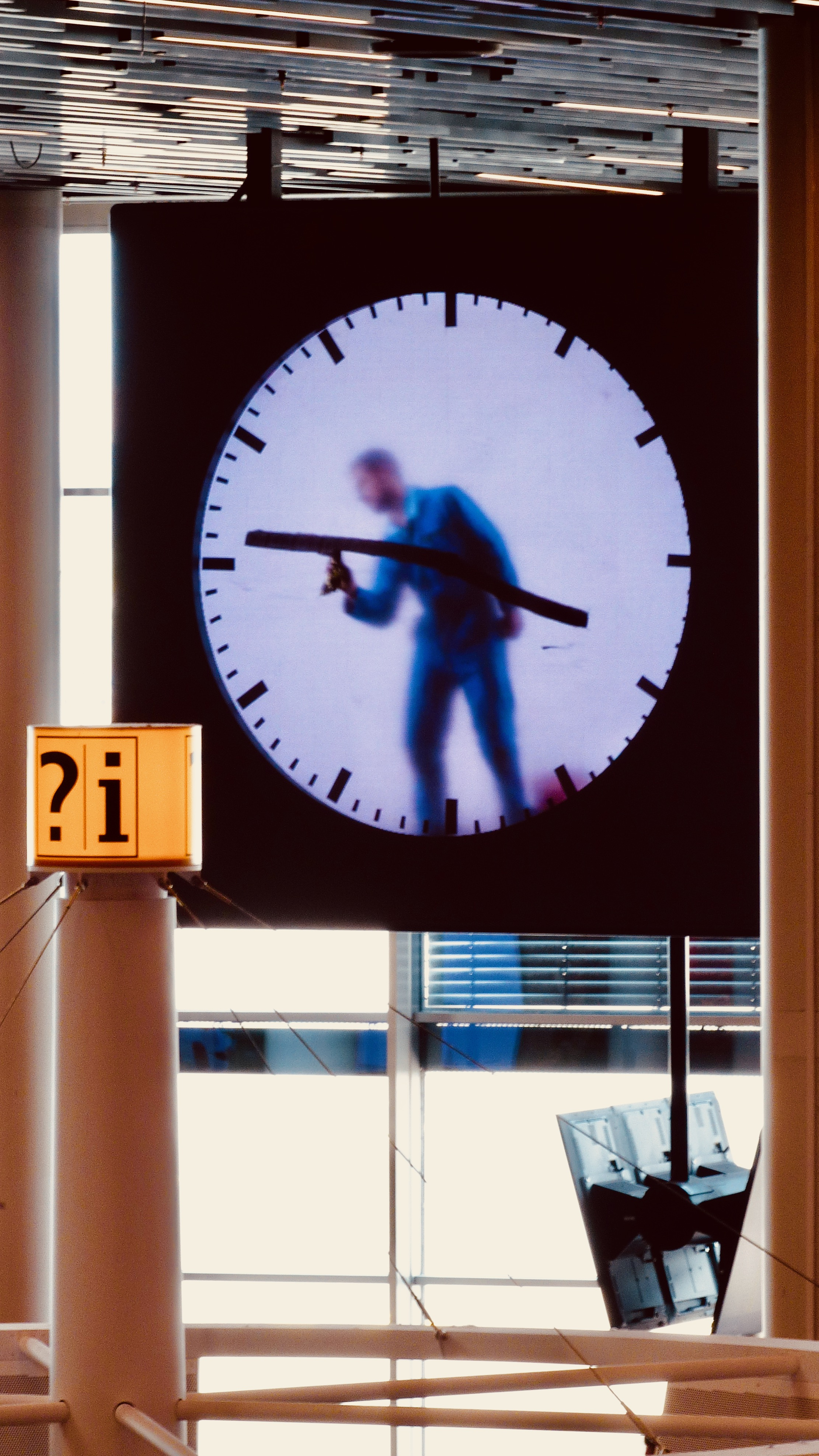
Maarten Baas's Schiphol Clock

Real Time is an art installation series by Dutch designer Maarten Baas. It consists of works in which people manually create and erase the hands on a clock each minute. Portions of the time depiction are completed using CGI after the motions of the painter are filmed separately and repeated to complete the 24 hours.

The first works in the series were launched in April 2009. They consist of videos in which sweepers move around trash to create the analog clock hands ("Sweeper's clock"), a person behind a translucent screen paints a digital clock, and grandfather clocks in which a man behind a screen paints the analog hands.

In 2016, Baas continued the series with the "Schiphol clock" at the Schiphol Airport in Amsterdam, Netherlands. It depicts a man behind a translucent screen painting the minutes. Baas recorded an actor (Tiago Sá da Costa) for 12 hours to create the video used.
