= Buffalo Pothole Bandit =

American artist

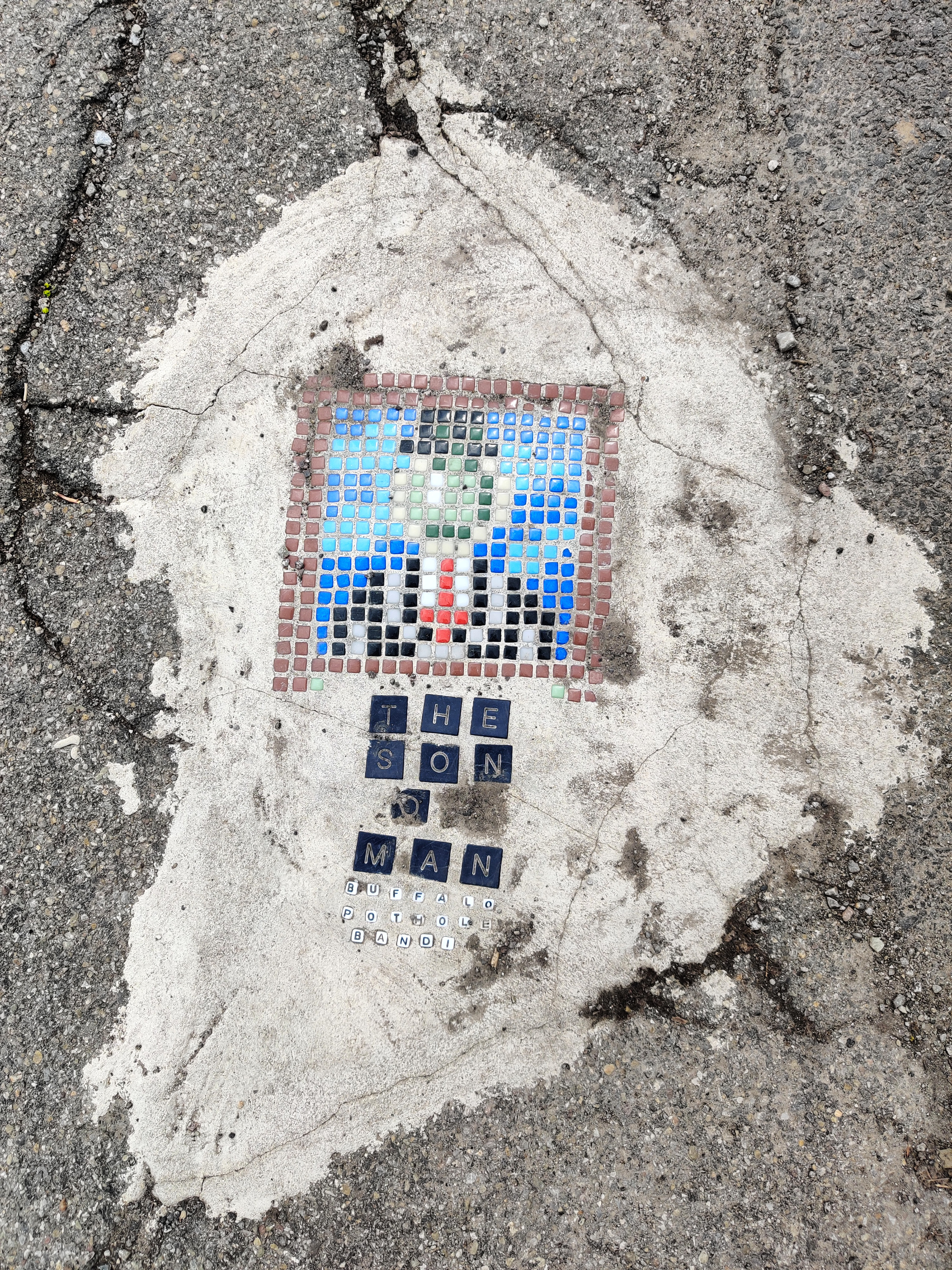
- Installation near Buffalo AKG Art Museum
- Born: Buffalo, New York
- Known for: Street art
- Style: Mosaic
- Website: buffalopotholebandit.com

The Buffalo Pothole Bandit (BPHB) is a street artist who fills potholes with mosaic art.

== Background ==
In 2022, the artist filled their first pothole in front of a Buffalo, New York bakery, determined to prevent themselves and others from becoming injured.

The artist has cited Toynbee tiles as their inspiration for creating the art installations.

In public appearances, the artist wears a raccoon mask to maintain anonymity.

== Installations ==
The artist frequently utilizes collaborators to complete installations, who are referred to as Banditos.

Local Buffalo artist Elizabeth Schmidt, who specializes in resin casting, has been cited as a collaborator.

Outside of Buffalo, they have also completed installations in Burlington, Vermont (2025), Ithaca, New York (2025), Portland, Oregon (2025), and New Orleans, Louisiana (2026).

== Political views ==
The artist endorsed Democratic state senator Sean Ryan in the 2025 Buffalo mayoral election, and starred in his campaign videos.

While the artist tries to avoid political messaging in their work, they have admitted incorporating themes of queer and LGBT pride.

== Awards ==
Buffalo Spree's Best of WNY 2024 – Best Public Art
