= National Amusement Park Historical Association =

Theme park history preservation organization

- Founded: 1978
- Location(s): P.O. Box 871 Lombard, IL 60148-0871
- Members: Over 500
- Website: www.napha.org

The National Amusement Park Historical Association (NAPHA) is an international organization dedicated to the preservation and enjoyment of the amusement and theme park industry – past, present and future.

NAPHA was founded in 1978 by a former employee of Chicago’s Riverview Park and has grown through the years to include amusement park enthusiasts from around the world.

== About ==
Since its founding in 1978, NAPHA has worked closely with the amusement industry to further its mission of preserving its heritage and traditions. As the world’s only organization dedicated to all aspects of the amusement industry, the organization fills a unique role.

As part of NAPHA’s mission to preserve the heritage and traditions of amusement parks, the organization tries to work with the industry to protect key components of its history. NAPHA’s efforts have resulted in the preservation of several historic rides.

NAPHA has also played an active role in recreating lost classics, providing vintage blueprints of old rides to help in the construction of new rides inspired by the old ones.

In 1986, NAPHA began to survey its members on a regular basis. Initially intended to provide feedback to NAPHA’s Executive Committee, it soon became a listing of favorite parks and attractions voted upon by an experienced group of amusement park visitors.

In 1993, NAPHA began its Life Membership Award to honor organizations from around the world that demonstrate a "commitment to preserving the heritage and traditions of the amusement park industry". Since then, the award has been presented to several parks, including Pleasure Beach Resort, Kennywood, Playland, and Knoebels Amusement Resort.

To further support its mission of preserving the heritage and tradition of the amusement industry, NAPHA established the Heritage Fund in 1994. Using funds raised from member and industry donations, memorabilia auctions, and other fundraising events, the fund succeeded in donating nearly $40,000 to organizations working to protect industry history. Recipients have included industry related museums, groups working to preserve or restore specific historic rides and non-profit operators of amusement parks.
