= Real-time Programming Language =

Real-time Programming Language (RPL) is a compiled database programming language used on CMC/Microdata/McDonnell Douglas REALITY databases, derived and expanded from the PROC procedure language, with much extra functionality added. It was originally developed under the name "PORC" by John Timmons and Paul Desjardins in about 1975. "PORC" was then further developed by Tim Holland under the employ of George Ridgway's company Systems Management, Inc. (SMI) in Chicago. A number of large scale manufacturing applications were developed in RPL, including that which was in use at Plessey and GEC-Plessey Telecommunications limited in Liverpool and also the Trifid suite of manufacturing software.

== Sources ==
- RPL 1.3 Reference Manual (PDF)
- "Software House Puts Emphasis on Nitty-Gritty", 10 Sep 1979.
