= Flyer =

Flyer or flier may refer to:

== Common meanings ==
- Aircraft pilot, a person who flies an aircraft
- Flyer (pamphlet), a single-page leaflet

== Arts and entertainment ==
- Flyer (band), a Croatian pop band
- Flyer (album), by Nanci Griffith
- Flyer (New-Gen), a Marvel Comics superhero

== Military uses ==
- USS Flier, an American World War II submarine
- General Dynamics Flyer, an Advanced Light Strike Vehicle platform in development for the US military

== People ==
- Flier (surname)
- Flyer (wrestler), ring name of a Mexican professional wrestler born 1994

== Science and technology ==
- Fast Low-Ionization Emission Region (FLIER), a poorly understood structure in some planetary nebulae
- HTC Flyer, a tablet computer released by HTC
- Flier (BEAM), a type of robot that can fly

== Sports ==
=== Ice hockey ===
- Philadelphia Flyers, a National Hockey League team from Philadelphia, Pennsylvania, United States
- Pensacola Ice Flyers, an ice hockey team from Pensacola, Florida, United States
- Spokane Flyers (senior), an ice hockey team from Spokane, Washington, United States
- Spokane Flyers (junior), an ice hockey team from Spokane, Washington
- Fife Flyers, an ice hockey team from Kirkcaldy, Scotland
- Kloten Flyers, an ice hockey team from Kloten, Switzerland
- Spektrum Flyers, an ice hockey team from Oslo, Norway

=== Baseball ===
- Fullerton Flyers, a baseball team from Fullerton, California, United States
- Panama City Fliers, a minor league baseball team based in Panama City, Florida, United States
- Schaumburg Flyers, a baseball team from Schaumburg, Illinois, United States

=== School teams ===
- Dayton Flyers, athletic teams of the University of Dayton, Ohio
- Flyers, the sports teams of Waynflete School, Portland, Maine
- Flyers and Lady Flyers, the sports teams of Franklin County High School (Kentucky)
- Flyers, the teams of Chaminade High School, Mineola, New York

=== Other sports ===
- Fort Worth Flyers, a basketball team from Fort Worth, Texas, United States
- Flyer, a position in cheerleading stunts

== Transportation ==
=== Automobiles ===
- Flyer (1913 automobile), manufactured by the Flyer Motor Car Company in Michigan, United States, from 1913 to 1914
- Alpena Flyer, an American automobile manufactured between 1910 and 1914 in Alpena, Michigan
- BYD Flyer, manufactured by BYD Auto in Shenzhen, China, since 2004
- Smith Flyer, manufactured by A.O. Smith Company in Milwaukee, United States, from 1915 until about 1919
- Thomas Flyer, manufactured by Thomas Motor Company

=== Aviation ===
- Wright Flyer, the first powered aircraft, built and flown by the Wright Brothers in 1903
- Abramovich Flyer, a biplane built by Vsevolod Abramovich in 1912
- Fisher Flyer, a single-engined ultralight biplane built by Michael Fisher in 1980
- Kolb Flyer, a twin-engined ultralight monoplane produced in kit form by Kolb Aircraft from 1980 to 1982
- Pfitzner Flyer, a monoplane designed by Alexander Pfitzner in 1909
- Flyer Indústria Aeronáutica, a Brazilian manufacturer of ultralight aircraft
- Flyer F600 NG, an ultralight aircraft from the Brazilian manufacturer Flyer Industria Aeronáutica Ltda.
- FLYER (magazine), a monthly UK aviation publication

=== Ships ===
- Flyer (yacht), with which Conny van Rietschoten won the 1977–1978 Whitbread Round the World Race
- Flyer II (yacht), with which Conny van Rietschoten won the 1981–1982 Whitbread Round the World Race
- Flyer (steamboat), a passenger ship which operated on Puget Sound from 1891 to 1930
- USNS Flyer, a cargo ship launched in 1944

=== Trains ===
==== Australia ====
- Newcastle Flyer, an express passenger service connecting Newcastle and Sydney from 1929 to 1988

==== New Zealand ====
- Kingston Flyer, a vintage steam service begun in 1982
- Kingston Flyer (train), an express passenger service operated between the 1890s and 1957
- Taranaki Flyer, a passenger service between New Plymouth and Wanganui which ended in 1959

==== United States ====
- Century Flyer, an historic narrow-gauge train
- Berkshire Flyer, a seasonal Amtrak passenger train service between New York City and the Berkshire Mountains in Pittsfield, Massachusetts
- Champlain Flyer, a commuter service connecting Burlington, Shelburne, and Charlotte, in Vermont, from 2000 to 2003
- Heartland Flyer, a passenger train between Fort Worth, Texas, and Oklahoma City, Oklahoma, begun in 1999
- O'Hare Flyer, a proposed airport rail link from downtown Chicago, Illinois, to O'Hare Airport
- Valley Flyer (ATSF train), a passenger service between Bakersfield and Oakland, in California, from 1939 to 1942
- Valley Flyer, a passenger train between New Haven, Connecticut and Greenfield, Massachusetts

=== Buses ===
- Flyer (bus service), bus services to Leeds Bradford Airport
- Spondon Flyer, a bus service in England
- Ilkeston Flyer, a bus service in England

== Other uses ==
- American Flyer, a toy train and model railroad brand
- Singapore Flyer, a giant Ferris wheel
- Flier (fish) (Centrarchus macropterus), a sunfish native to the southern United States
- Memphis Flyer, a free weekly alternative newspaper
- Filmotype Flyer, typeface produced by Filmotype
- Flyer, one of the two components of a flying buttress
- Flyer, a U-shaped mechanism in a spinning wheel, invented in the late 15th century
- Flyer, a female kangaroo

== See also ==
- New Flyer, a Canadian bus manufacturer
