= Twisted Colossus =

Roller coaster at Magic Mountain

- Previously known as Colossus (1978–2014)
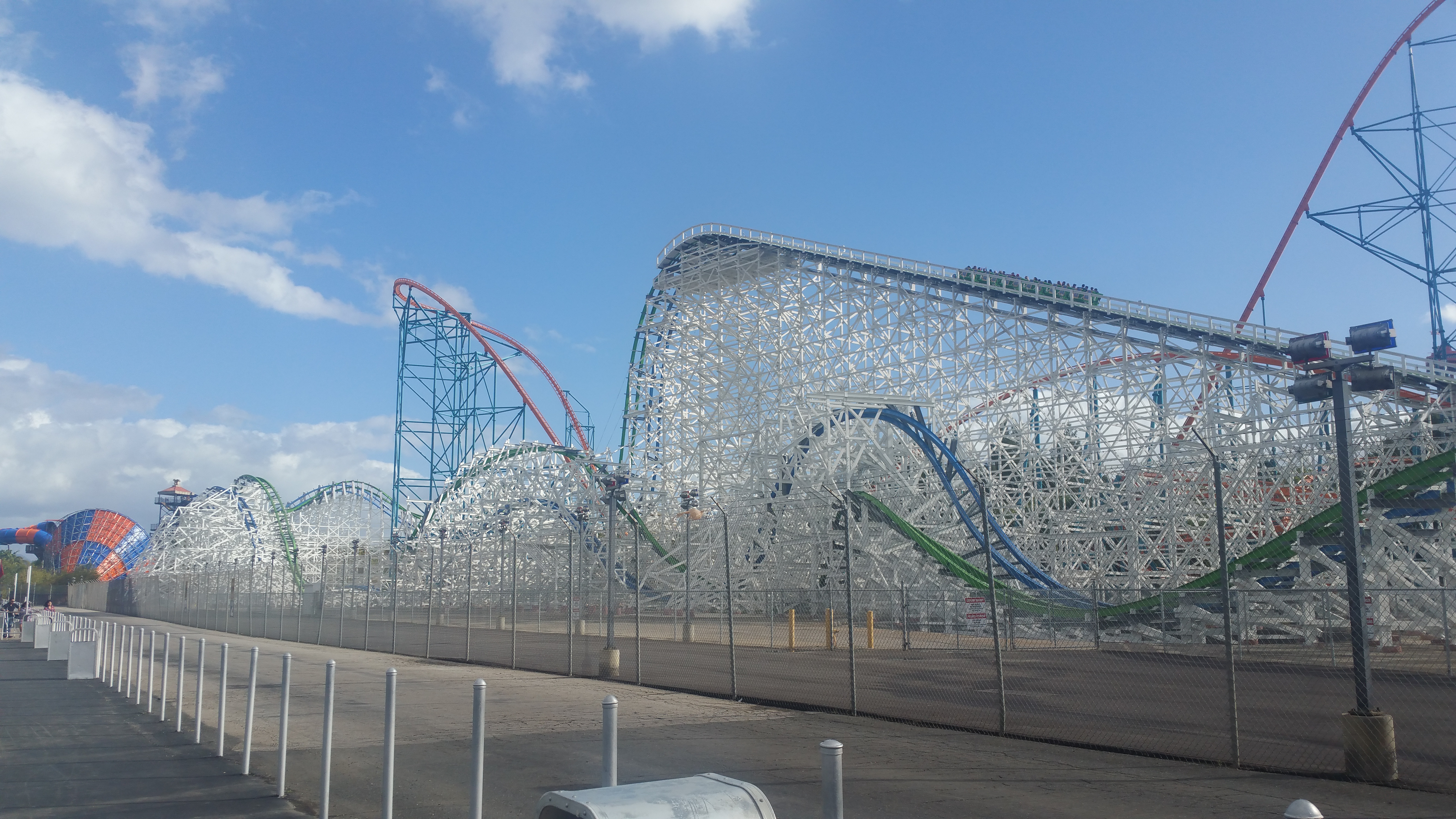
- Twisted Colossus

Six Flags Magic Mountain
- Location: Six Flags Magic Mountain
- Park section: Screampunk District
- Coordinates: 34°25′40″N 118°35′51″W
- Status: Operating
- Opening date: May 23, 2015
- Replaced: Colossus

General statistics
- Type: Steel
- Manufacturer: Rocky Mountain Construction
- Designer: Alan Schilke
- Model: I-Box – Custom
- Track layout: Möbius Loop with one station
- Lift/launch system: Chain lift hill
- Height: 121 ft (37 m)
- Drop: 115 ft (35 m)
- Length: 4,990 ft (1,520 m)
- Speed: 57 mph (92 km/h)
- Inversions: 2
- Duration: 3:40
- Max vertical angle: 80°
- Height restriction: 48 in (122 cm)
- Trains: 4 (3 max. in use) trains with 6 cars; riders arranged 2 across in 2 rows for a total of 24 riders per train
- Fast Lane available
- Must transfer from wheelchair
- Twisted Colossus at RCDB

Twisted Colossus is a steel roller coaster located at Six Flags Magic Mountain in Valencia, California. Originally designed and built by International Amusement Devices, the roller coaster opened as Colossus, a dual-tracked roller coaster, on June 29, 1978. It was the tallest and fastest wooden roller coaster in the world and the first with two drops greater than 100 feet (30 m). Colossus became well known after appearances in film and television, including the box-office hit National Lampoon's Vacation and the made-for-TV movie Kiss Meets the Phantom of the Park. For 19 years, it was the park's main attraction until the opening of Superman: The Escape.

After more than 36 years in operation, Six Flags closed Colossus on August 16, 2014. Rocky Mountain Construction renovated the ride converting its wooden track to steel, allowing for the addition of inversions and steep drops. It retained much of its wooden structure, however, and reemerged as Twisted Colossus on May 23, 2015.

== History ==
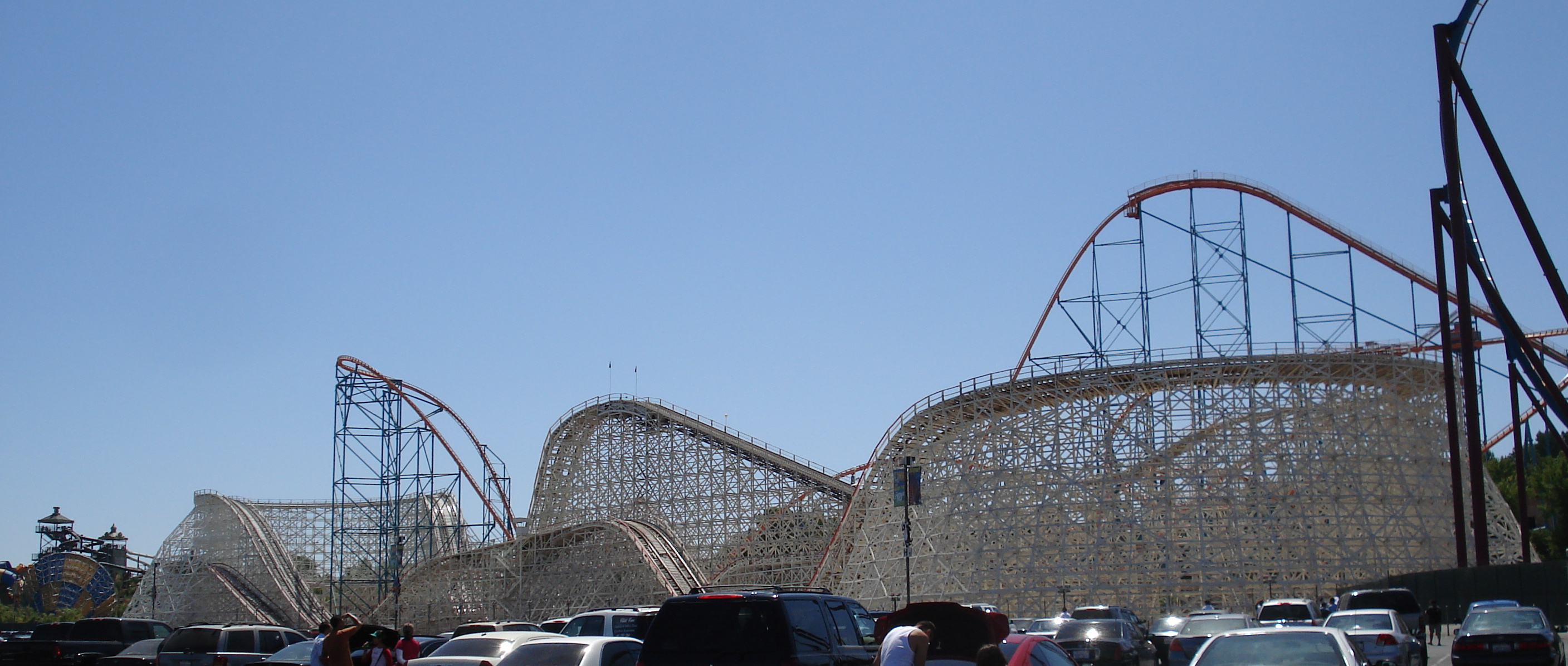
Colossus in 2007 prior to the renovation

For its next attraction to debut in 1978, Magic Mountain wanted a wooden roller coaster for the classic "rumble and sway" experience that they felt was missing from steel coasters. They hired Ohio-based International Amusement Devices (IAD), who began designing Colossus in January 1977. IAD in turn subcontracted Bernard Brothers Construction for the construction of the ride, Continental Consultants for all of the mechanical systems, and Lorenz & Williams for the structural engineering and electronic systems. A member of the design team traveled to Mexico City to study Montaña Rusa – the largest wooden roller coaster in the world at the time – in order to help plan for the project.

The design was finalized in May 1977, and construction began a few months later in August. During construction, a tornado caused part of the structure to collapse, but the roller coaster was still completed on schedule. At a final cost of $7 million, Colossus opened to the public on June 29, 1978. It was the tallest and fastest roller coaster in the world, as well as the first to feature two drops over 100 feet (30 m).

=== Modifications ===
Colossus underwent a number of changes over the years. In 1979, the ride closed for approximately ten months to remove excessive negative g-forces. The speed hill after the second drop, the double-up element, and several of the ride's other hills were reprofiled. Also, the original IAD trains were replaced with trains manufactured by Philadelphia Toboggan Company (PTC) during this renovation. In 1987, the PTC trains were replaced with trains manufactured by Morgan Manufacturing, and the valley within the double-dip element was leveled off and received block brakes in 1991.

During the Halloween season, the coaster's web-like structure was accompanied by a giant black spider, and the height restriction became 54 inches (1,400 mm). On August 29, 2013, Six Flags Magic Mountain announced that they would run Colossus backward for a limited time during the 2014 season. The train on one side of the track was changed to run backward using the old trains from the now defunct Psyclone roller coaster.

=== Closure and refurbishment announcement ===
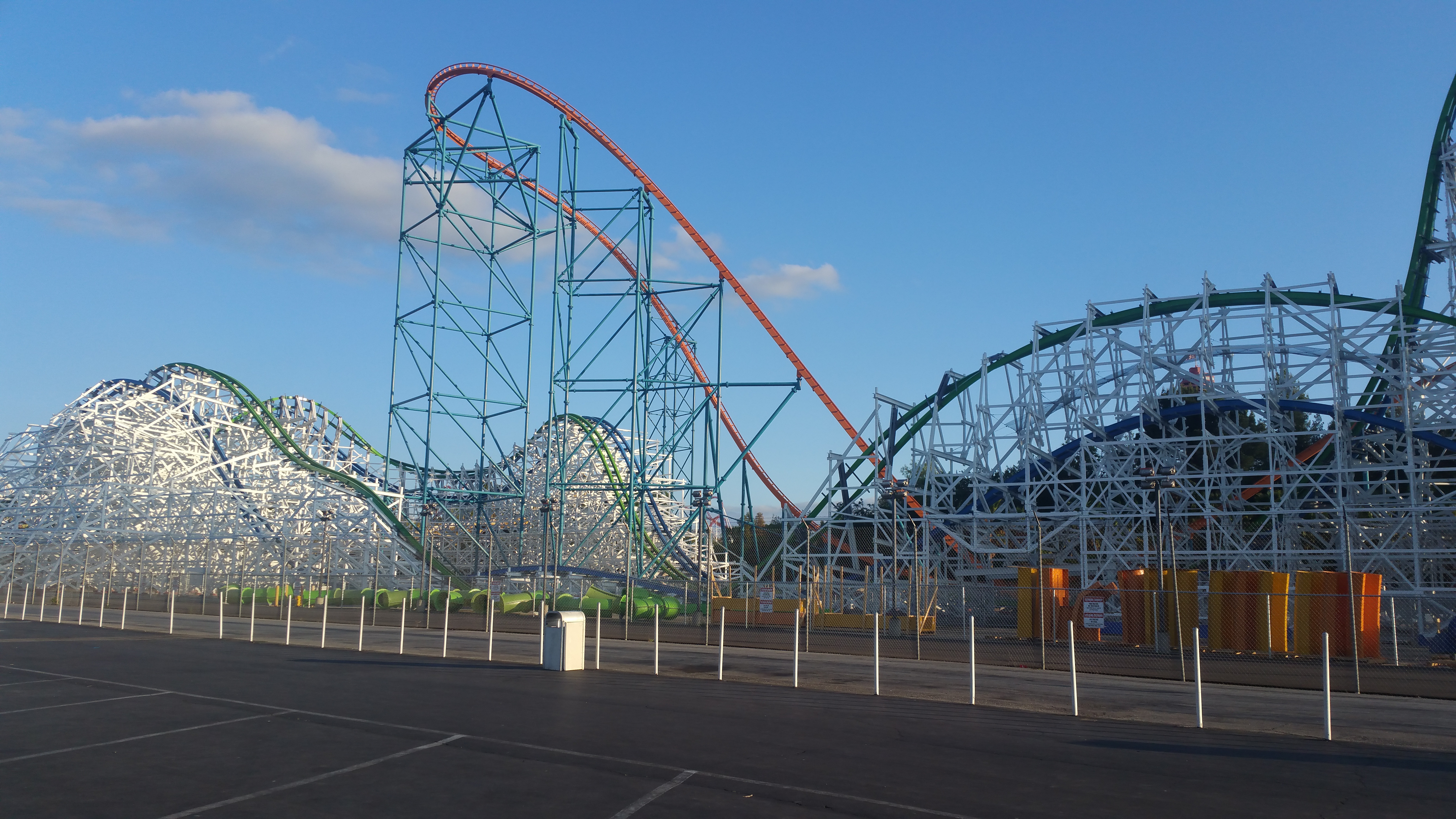
Twisted Colossus

During the 2014 season, Six Flags Magic Mountain announced that Colossus would close permanently on August 16, 2014. On August 4, 2014, the park held a 36-hour riding marathon event on the roller coaster as a way for the public to say goodbye to one of the park's staples. Out of 24 participants, six completed the marathon of 328 laps around the track in 45-minute intervals.

On September 8, 2014, Colossus caught fire. Less than two weeks after the ride closed, Six Flags announced that Colossus would reopen in 2015 as Twisted Colossus following a renovation by Rocky Mountain Construction. The company added their patented I-Box track technology to the ride, which converts wooden track to steel while retaining most of the original wooden structure.

In late 2018, the trains were updated with zipper pouches and modified lap bars.

== Characteristics ==
The table below summarizes the differences between Colossus and Twisted Colossus. With the exception of capacity, the statistics of Colossus represent a single track only.

Statistic	Colossus	Twisted Colossus
Years	1978–2014	2015–present
Manufacturer	International Amusement Devices	Rocky Mountain Construction
Designer	Lorenz & Williams	Alan Schilke
Track type	Wood	Steel
Track layout	Racing	Möbius loop
Height	125 ft (38 m)	121 ft (37 m)
Drop	115 ft (35 m)	116 ft (35 m)
Length	4,325 ft (1,318 m)	4,990 ft (1,520 m)
Speed	62 mph (100 km/h)	57 mph (92 km/h)
Max vertical angle	Between 50° and 55°	80°
G-force	3.2	3.2
Capacity (riders per hour)	2,600	800 to 1,000
Duration	2:30	3:40
Inversions	None	2
Trains	Morgan Manufacturing	Rocky Mountain Construction

== Ride experience ==
=== Colossus ===
The previous configuration of the roller coaster featured two drops greater than 100 feet (30 m); the first drop was 115 feet (35 m) and the second was 105 feet (32 m). The ride spanned two and a half minutes and reached speeds up to 62 miles per hour (100 km/h). Its original configuration was noted for numerous and sustained air-time moments, which were eventually toned down or eliminated by reprofiling and/or braking.

=== Twisted Colossus ===
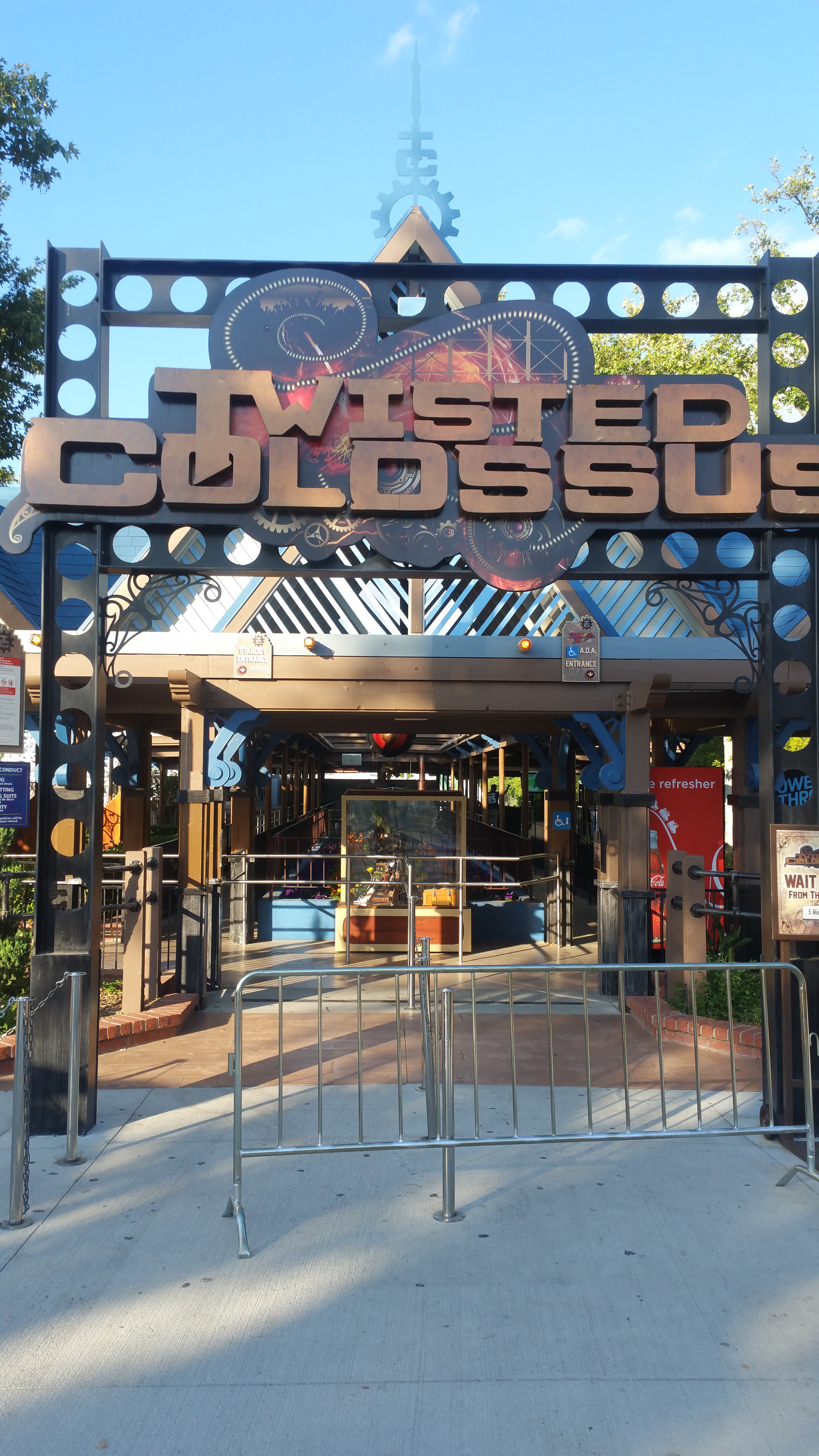
The ride's entrance

The ride begins on the blue track, boarding from what was the right side track's station. Immediately after dispatch, the ride makes a 90 degree left turn, is sent through a set of drive tires to boost the train towards the pre-lift section, and makes another left turn. After going through a series of small hills in the pre-lift, the train makes its way up the right side of the lift hill, catching up to the train on the green track. Immediately after the lift hill ends, riders are sent down an 80 degree, 128 foot drop. The trains then go through a small airtime hill and then up another tall hill, crossing under Goliath. The train then proceeds to go through a banked turn to the left, and goes through a "high-five" element. After this, the blue tracked train drops down and goes under the train on the green track while it does its top gun stall. The blue track goes through an airtime hill, taking riders close to the train in the green track's stall. Then the blue tracked train does a zero-g roll. After a double up and a quick turn to the left, the blue track turns green and the train hits a brake run, before returning to the left side of the lift hill. The green track is identical to the blue tracked segment up through the high-five, which is banked in the opposite direction as to create the "high-five" illusion with the blue track. After the high-five, the green track does a double down and does a top gun stall crossing over the blue track. After crossing under the blue track's zero-g roll, it then goes up a double up and turns left, where the train hits the final brake run.

Because Twisted Colossus is a racing coaster with one long continuous circuit, it may be considered a Möbius loop roller coaster. However, unlike most Möbius Loop layouts, it only has one station and one cycle sends riders through both sides. This is different from a traditional Möbius loop layout (such as Racer at Kennywood), which takes riders through only half of the ride's "complete" circuit before stopping and unloading at the other station.

Because of the unusual setup of a one-station Möbius loop layout, to race, the operators on Twisted Colossus must properly time dispatches. While a train is in the blue side, the ride operators will sometimes call out " __ seconds to race", counting down to encourage riders to board quickly so they can race. To give the ride operators extra time, the green lift can run slower than the blue lift, giving the blue side time to catch up.

== In pop culture ==
The roller coaster, alongside other Six Flags Magic Mountain rides, was featured in the music video of Katy Perry's "Chained To The Rhythm ft. Skip Marley". It is used as a backdrop for Skip Marley's part and the final chorus, where a dance scene takes place at the foot of the ride's high five element.

This attraction is featured in the 2021 film, Yes Day.

Colossus was nearing completion in May 1978 when it was used as a backdrop for fight scenes in the NBC TV movie Kiss Meets the Phantom of the Park. In 1983, it was featured in the film National Lampoon's Vacation as Screemy Meemy. In the sitcom Step by Step, Colossus is the roller coaster that the Lambert-Foster family rides in the opening sequence. The roller coaster was also seen in television episodes of Knight Rider, Wonder Woman, and The A-Team. American rapper, Tyler, the Creator has a song named after Colossus on his 2013 album, Wolf. The song is about a crazed fan encounter at Six Flags Magic Mountain.

== Incidents ==
A 20-year-old woman died after being thrown from the ride in December 1978. An investigation determined the lap bar restraint was in working condition, but they speculated that the rider's size may have made the restraint ineffective.

On September 8, 2014, while workers were disassembling the track, the top of the lift hill on Colossus caught on fire. The fire – which occurred while the park was closed – was contained and no injuries were reported.

On July 7, 2022, an 8-year-old girl was wounded when a mobile phone struck her in the head while she was riding the roller coaster.

== Awards ==
Twisted Colossus ranked in the Amusement Today's Golden Ticket Awards for best new ride of 2015 with 13% of the vote, coming in third place.

Golden Ticket Awards: Best New Ride for 2015
Ranking	3

Golden Ticket Awards: Top steel Roller Coasters
Year									1998	1999
Ranking									–	–
Year	2000	2001	2002	2003	2004	2005	2006	2007	2008	2009
Ranking	–	–	–	–	–	–	–	–	–	–
Year	2010	2011	2012	2013	2014	2015	2016	2017	2018	2019
Ranking	–	–	–	–	–	28	26	16	24	6
Year	2020	2021	2022	2023	2024	2025	2026			
Ranking	N/A	16	18	28	30 (tie)	30	43			

Preceded by Screamin' Eagle	World's Tallest Wooden Roller Coaster; June 1978–May 1981	Succeeded by American Eagle
Preceded by Screamin' Eagle	World's Tallest Roller Coaster; June 1978–May 1981	Succeeded by American Eagle
Preceded by Screamin' Eagle	World's Tallest Roller Coaster Drop; June 1978–April 1979	Succeeded by The Beast
Preceded by Screamin' Eagle	World's Fastest Roller Coaster; June 1978–April 1979	Succeeded by The Beast
