= Montaña Rusa (La Feria Chapultepec Mágico) =

Roller coaster in Mexico City, Mexico

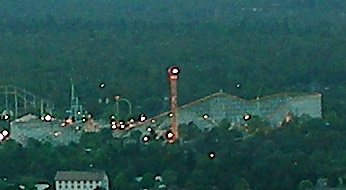
- Montaña Rusa (coaster in foreground)

La Feria Chapultepec Mágico
- Location: La Feria Chapultepec Mágico
- Coordinates: 19°24′59″N 99°11′44″W
- Status: Removed
- Opening date: 22 October 1964
- Closing date: 13 October 2019

General statistics
- Type: Wood
- Manufacturer: National Amusement Devices
- Designer: Aurel Vaszin, Edward Leis
- Height: 110 ft (34 m)
- Drop: 80 ft (24 m)
- Length: 4,000 ft (1,200 m)
- Speed: 40 mph (64 km/h)
- Inversions: 0
- Montaña Rusa at RCDB

Montaña Rusa was a wooden roller coaster at La Feria Chapultepec Mágico in Mexico City, Mexico. In 1993, it was renamed Serpiente de Fuego (Serpent of Fire) but later it was changed back to Montaña Rusa. For several years, Montaña Rusa held the record of world's tallest roller coaster. With the conversion of Medusa at Six Flags México into a hybrid roller coaster in 2014, Montaña Rusa was the last wooden roller coaster in Mexico. In 2020, it was announced that Montaña Rusa would be removed from the park. The coaster was dismantled in July 2022.

== History ==
Montaña Rusa was constructed in 1964 by International Amusement Devices, Inc. and was designed by Aurel Vaszin and Edward Leis. Aspects of the coaster's design served as an inspiration for the designers of future roller coasters, such as Screamin' Eagle and Colossus. In the 1980s, Montaña Rusa underwent a major $800,000 renovation and refurbishment for safety and ride comfort. Following the work, the original coaster builder responded with a tongue-in-cheek remark that he was "at least 80 percent sure" that roller coaster passengers would remain in the trains' seats.

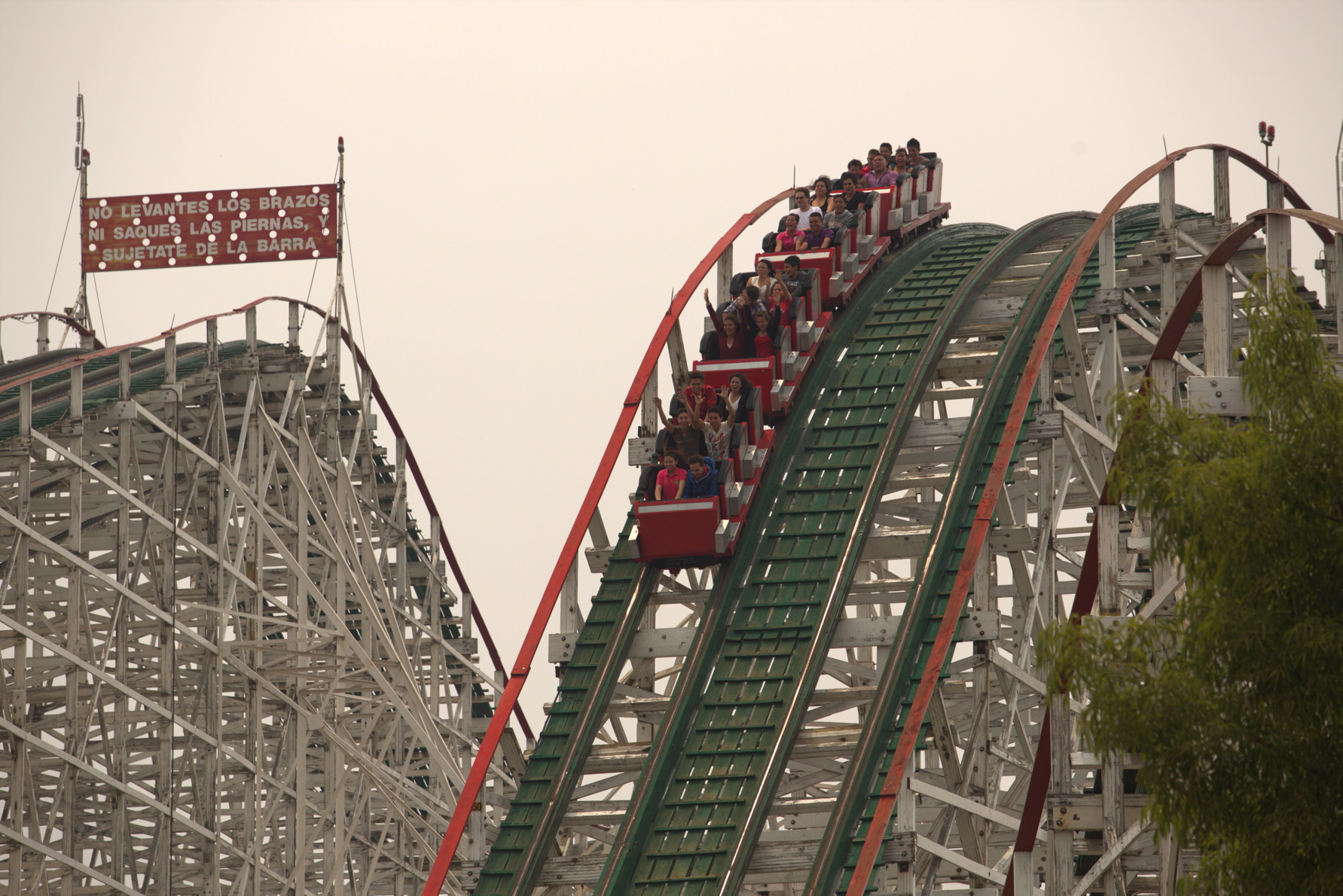
Montaña Rusa, 2015

In 2006, Luis Felipe Santamaría set a record for roller coaster endurance by riding on Montaña Rusa for a total of 1,333 consecutive rides. He did not leave the train, and only briefly stopped for medical checks. Santamaría both ate and slept on the roller coaster.

In April 2022, works began to demolish the structure, marking the end of Montaña Rusa as La Feria de Chapultepec is going to become "Parque Aztlán", with Mexico City as the main theme for future attractions.

== Layout and ride experience ==
The layout of Montaña Rusa is unusual in that it is a Möbius loop coaster. This coaster design means that a left-track ride will result in a return on the right-track side and vice versa; it also means that the coaster has a continuous track of 8,000 feet (2,400 m). Montaña Rusa is one of only a handful of such coasters in the world. In 1979, roller coaster expert Robert Cartmell rated it as being the 8th best roller coaster in North America—as well as rating it the "most brutal", a characteristic that stemmed partly from Mexico City's 7,350 feet (2,240 m) altitude.

== See also ==
- Russian Mountains

Preceded by Cyclone	World's Tallest Roller Coaster; 1964–1966	Succeeded by Giant Coaster
Preceded by Cyclone	World's Tallest Wooden Roller Coaster; 1964–May 1976	Succeeded by Colossus
