= Aurel Vaszin =

Aurel “Dutch” Vaszin (1885–1979) was a carpenter, engineer and roller coaster designer, best known for heading the National Amusement Device company and designing some of the largest roller coasters of his day.

== Life and work ==
Vaszin was born in Romania in April, 1885, and came to the United States in 1904. At that time, he was trained as a cabinet maker, with a sixth grade education. In 1913 he took a job as a craftsman at an amusement park headquartered in New Haven, Connecticut. He worked on assignments for the Lakeside Amusement Park in Dayton, Ohio, after which he planned to open his own business in Dayton.

Between 1919 and 1920, he opened the Dayton Fun House, an amusement park in Dayton. This was later renamed to National Amusement Devices, and produced trains and other supplies for over 400 amusement parks around the country.

He also developed and opened the Forest Park Zoological Gardens on 43 acres of land located off of North Main Street in Dayton; but this was forced to close in 1935 during the Great Depression.

== National Amusement Devices ==
As the Dayton Fun House grew in popularity, it began producing miniature trains and other gear for other amusement parks. After World War II, it was renamed to National Amusement Devices and attracted designer John Miller. They began designing entire roller coasters for other parks, some much larger than they could set up in Dayton.

This included a number of international projects, such as a mile-long ravine coaster in a national park in Guatemala, and the "Russian Mountain" in Mexico City's Chapultepec Park. The "Russian Mountain"/"La Montaña Rusa" was billed in 1964 as the largest roller coaster in the world - 110 ft high and 5,000 ft long. As of 2008 it was the oldest roller coaster in Mexico, and one of the only NAD rides still in operation.

Vaszin also designed some of NAD's most popular miniature trains, including the "Century Flyer", which was used in around 100 parks. As of 2012, the Century Flyer in Conway, Arkansas is listed in the National Register of Historic Places, due to being one of the few remaining NAD trains in operation.

== Later life and death ==
Vaszin retired in 1973, and NAD was sold and renamed International Amusement Devices. He continued to advise the company until his death on May 15, 1979.

He was survived by two sisters in Romania. His papers were given to the Wright State University Archives in 1980 by his friend Eva Berry.
