= Flier (surname) =

Flier or Flyer is a surname. Notable people with the surname include:

- Jaap Flier (born 1934), Dutch ballet dancer and choreographer
- Jeffrey Scott Flier (born 1948), American physician, endocrinologist, researcher and Dean of the Faculty of Medicine at Harvard University
- Manon Flier (born 1984), Dutch volleyball player
- Natasha Flyer (born 1969), American earth scientist and applied mathematician
- Yakov Flier (1912-1977), Russian concert pianist and teacher

== See also ==
- Van der Flier
