= Van der Flier =

Van der Flier is a Dutch surname. Notable people with the surname include:

- Cor van der Flier, Dutch cricketer
- Henk van der Flier (born 1945), Dutch psychologist
- Josh van der Flier (born 1993), Irish rugby union player
- Julie van der Flier (born 1997), Irish cricketer

== See also ==
- Flier (surname)
