= RAF Fauld explosion =

1944 military accident in Staffordshire, England

- Staffordshire, England, UK
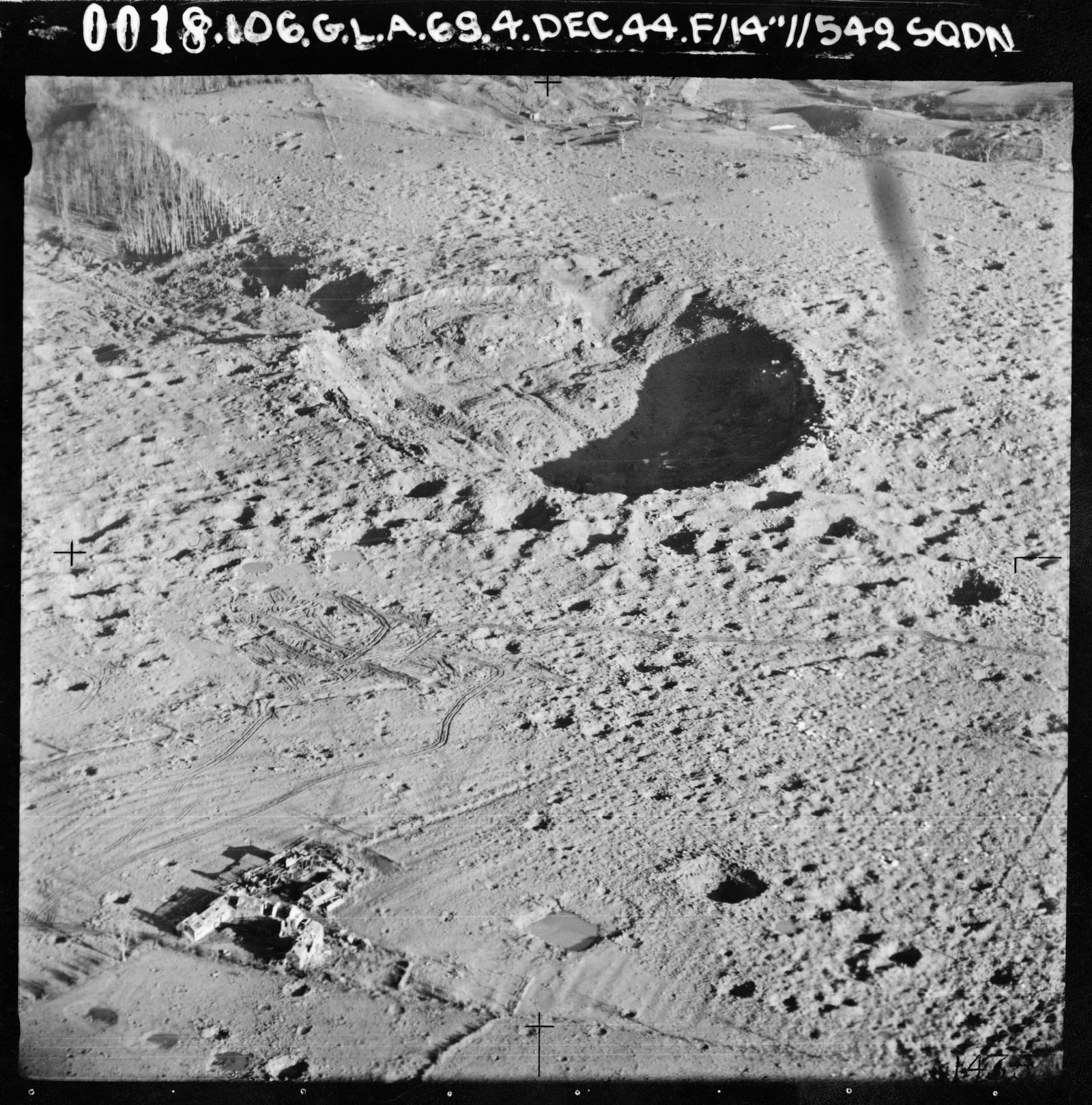
- An aerial view of the crater and damage to the surrounding area caused by the explosion, taken by the RAF on 4 December 1944

Location
- Location in Staffordshire
- Coordinates: 52°50′50″N 01°43′50″W

The RAF Fauld explosion occurred during the Second World War at the RAF Fauld underground munitions storage depot in Staffordshire, England at 11:11 am on Monday, 27 November 1944. The blast, which was one of the largest non-nuclear explosions in history, detonated between 3,500 and 4,000 tonnes (3,900 and 4,400 tons) of high explosive military ordnance. It created an explosion crater with a depth of 100 feet (30 m) and a maximum width of 1,007 feet (307 m).

A reservoir containing 450,000 cubic metres (16,000,000 cu ft) of water was obliterated, along with nearby buildings and an entire farm. Flooding from the reservoir added to the destruction.

A combination of the power of the explosion and wartime censorship in the UK means that the exact death toll is uncertain; it is believed that about 70 people died in the explosion and resulting flood. The crater, which is now known as the Hanbury Crater, is still visible just south of Fauld, to the east of Hanbury, Staffordshire.

== Explosion ==
No. 21 Maintenance Unit RAF Bomb Storage dump was constructed in disused underground gypsum mine workings. The tunnels were used to store a variety of ordnance, bombs and explosives used by the Royal Air Force; in addition to shells and bombs, it also held up to 500 million rounds of small arms ammunition. At 11:15 hours on 27 November 1944, two explosions occurred within the ordnance storage depot. Up to 4,000 tonnes (4,400 tons) of explosives detonated, including 3,500 tonnes (3,900 tons) of high explosive bombs. It left a crater 300 yards (270 m) by 233 yards (213 m) in length and 100 feet (30 m) deep, covering 12 acres (4.9 ha).

Eyewitnesses reported seeing two distinct columns of black smoke in the form of a mushroom cloud ascending several thousand feet, and a blaze at the foot of each column. According to the commanding officer of 21 M.U., Group Captain Storrar, an open dump of incendiary bombs caught fire but it was allowed to burn itself out without damage or casualties.

All property within a radius of three-quarters of a mile (1.2 km) of the crater was completely or significantly damaged. Upper Castle Hayes Farm was completely destroyed. The Peter Ford & Sons lime and gypsum works to the north of the village and Purse cottages were obliterated. The lime works was also flooded when the explosion destroyed the reservoir dam. Hanbury Fields Farm, Hare Holes Farm and also Croft Farm with adjacent cottages were all extensively damaged. Debris also damaged Hanbury village.

== Casualties ==
At the time, no precise records were kept monitoring the exact number of workers at the facility. While the exact death toll is uncertain as a result of this, at least 70 people are believed to have died in the explosion. The official report stated that 90 were killed, missing or injured, including:

- 26 killed or missing at the RAF dump — divided between RAF personnel, civilian workers and some Italian prisoners of war who were working there — five of whom were gassed by toxic fumes; 10 were also severely injured. Six are buried in military graves.
- 37 killed (drowned) or missing at Peter Ford & Sons gypsum mine and plaster mill, and surrounding countryside; 12 also injured.
- Approximately seven farm workers at the nearby Upper Castle Hayes Farm.
- One diver was killed during search and rescue operations.

200 cattle were also killed by the explosion. Some live cattle were removed from the vicinity, but were found dead the following morning.

The inscription on the memorial stone that was erected at the crater in November 1990, lists 70 names of people who died as a result of the explosion. 18 of these names are people who are still missing and presumed dead. A relief fund organised by the local people made payments to victims and their families until 1959.

== Investigation ==
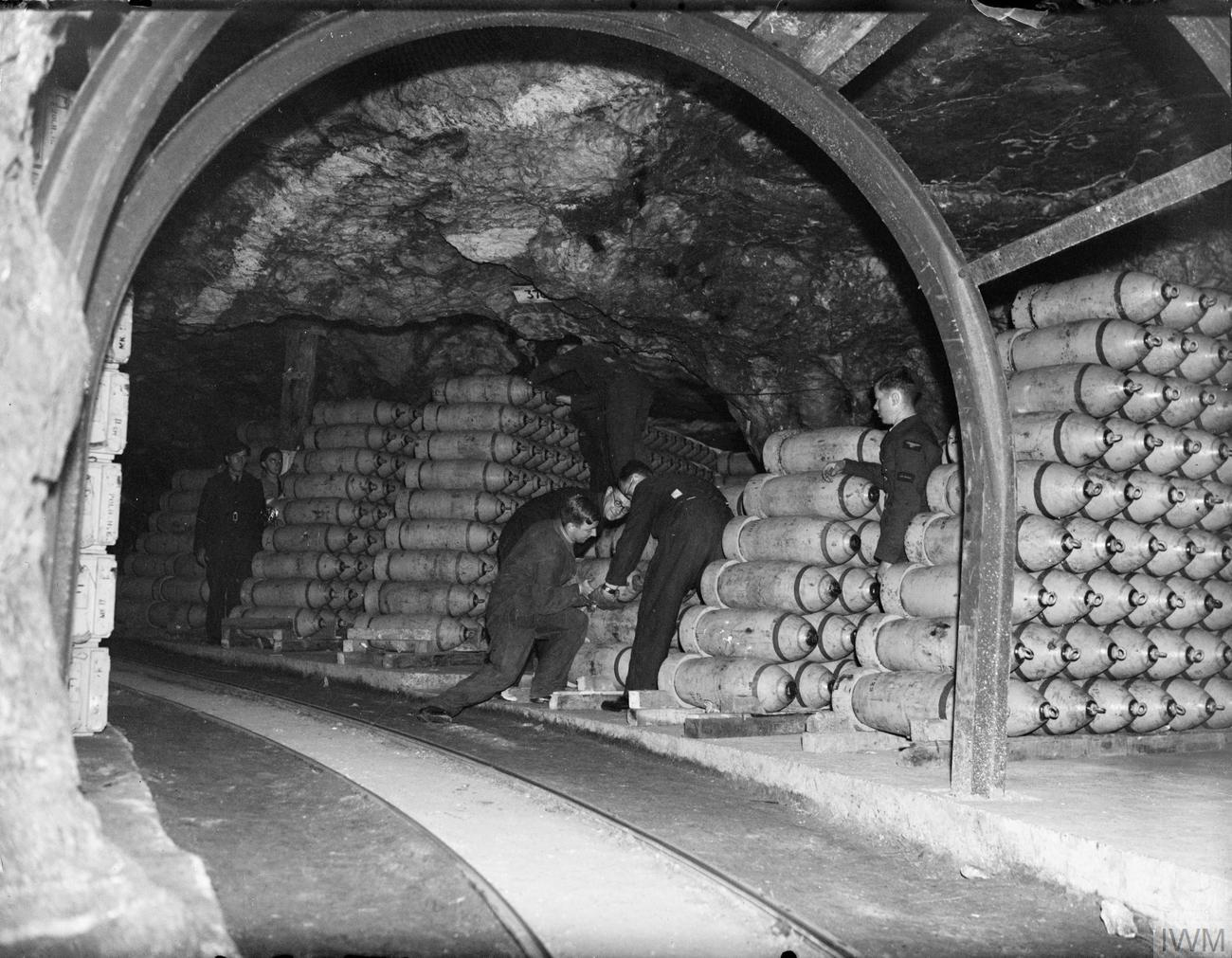
Bombs being stacked in one of the tunnels at RAF Fauld

The cause of the disaster was not made public at the time. As it was during the Second World War, the British government did not want Nazi Germany or the Empire of Japan to know the extent of the disaster. A secret investigation concluded that a variety of factors and circumstances had contributed to the cause.

There had been staff shortages, a management position had remained empty for a year, and 189 inexperienced Italian prisoners of war were working in the mines at the time of the accident. There were also equipment shortages, a lack of training for the workers, multiple agencies in the mine resulted in a lack of an organised chain of command, and pressure from British government and military to increase work rate for the war effort resulted in safety regulations being often overlooked.

The report was not publicly released until 1974. The explosion was probably caused by a site worker removing a detonator from a live bomb using a brass chisel, rather than a wooden batten, resulting in sparks. An eyewitness testified that he had seen workers using brass chisels, in direct contravention of safety regulations.

== Aftermath ==
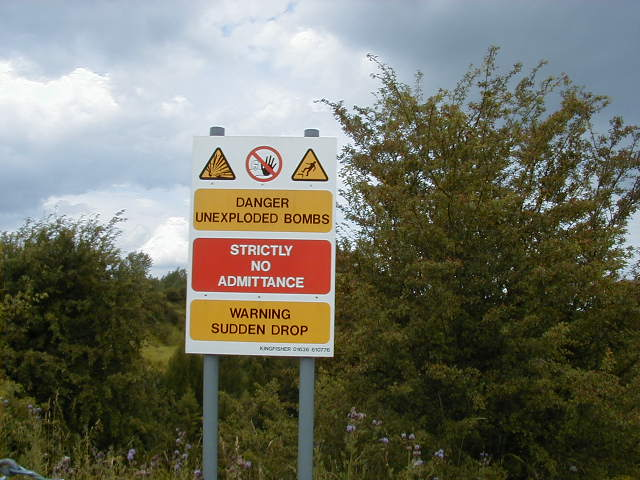
A sign warning of unexploded munitions at the crater site in Fauld

Although much of the storage facility was annihilated by the explosion, the site continued to be used by the RAF for munitions storage until 1966, when No. 21 Maintenance Unit was disbanded. Following France's withdrawal from NATO's integrated military structure in 1966, the site was used by the United States Army between 1967 and 1973 to store US ammunition previously stored in France.

By 1979, RAF Fauld had been closed and fenced off. The area is now covered with over 150 species of trees and wildlife. Access is restricted as a significant amount of explosive ordnance remains buried in the site. The UK government has deemed its removal too expensive to be feasible.

== Memorial ==
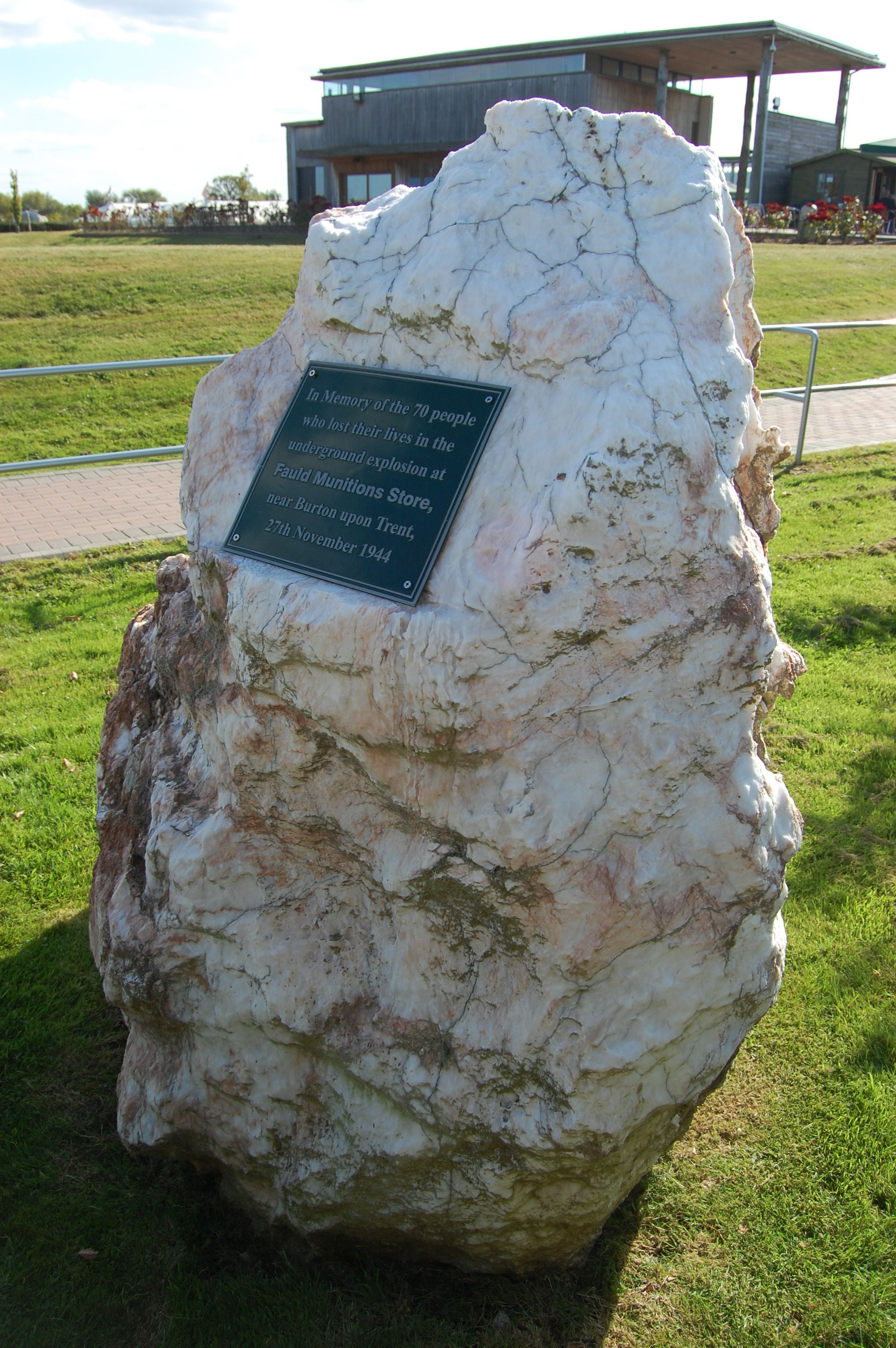
A memorial to the victims at the National Memorial Arboretum in Staffordshire

On 13 September 1990, 46 years after the initial incident, it was announced that a memorial stone was to be erected to commemorate those who died, to be paid for by the public, as Hanbury Parish Council did not have the necessary funds. The stone used for the memorial was donated by the Italian government and flown to the United Kingdom on an RAF plane. It was unveiled on 25 November 1990.

A second memorial was dedicated on the 70th anniversary of the explosion, 27 November 2014. A tourist trail leads to the crater from the Cock Inn pub in Hanbury, which was damaged by debris from the explosion.

The maintenance unit was the subject of several paintings under the collective title "The Bomb Store" by David Bomberg, who was briefly employed as a war artist by the War Ministry in 1943.

== See also ==
- List of United Kingdom disasters by death toll
- RAF munitions storage during WWII
