= Giant Coaster (Fuji-Q Highland) =

Defunct steel roller coaster

Fuji-Q Highland
- Location: Fuji-Q Highland
- Coordinates: 35.487°N 138.780°E
- Status: Removed
- Opening date: 1966
- Closing date: 1997

General statistics
- Type: Steel
- Manufacturer: Sansei Technologies
- Lift/launch system: Chain lift hill
- Height: 25 m (82 ft)
- Length: 1,432 m (4,698 ft)
- Speed: 80 km/h (50 mph)
- Inversions: 0
- Duration: 3:20
- Giant Coaster at RCDB

Giant Coaster (ジャイアントコースター) was a steel roller coaster located at Fuji-Q Highland in Fujiyoshida, Yamanashi, Japan. Giant Coaster was the longest roller coaster in the world when it opened, as featured in the Guinness Book of World Records, as well as a commemorative display placed in Fuji-Q Highland during the 2019 season.

Preceded by Racer	World's Longest Roller Coaster; 1966 – April 1979	Succeeded by The Beast
