= Hanbury, Staffordshire =

Village in Staffordshire, England

Coordinates: 52.848°N 1.746°W

Hanbury
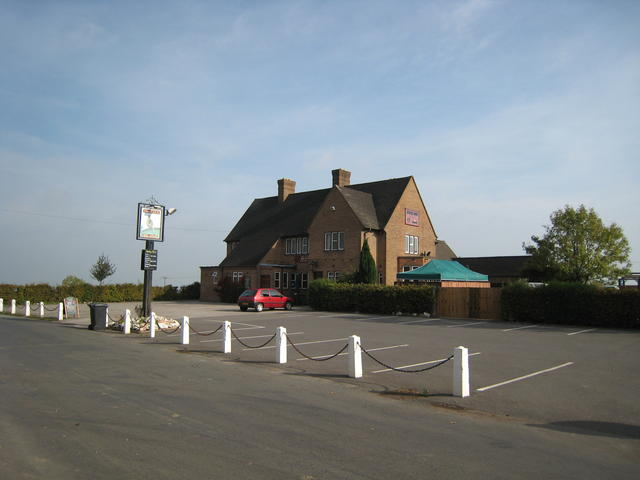
- The Cock Inn

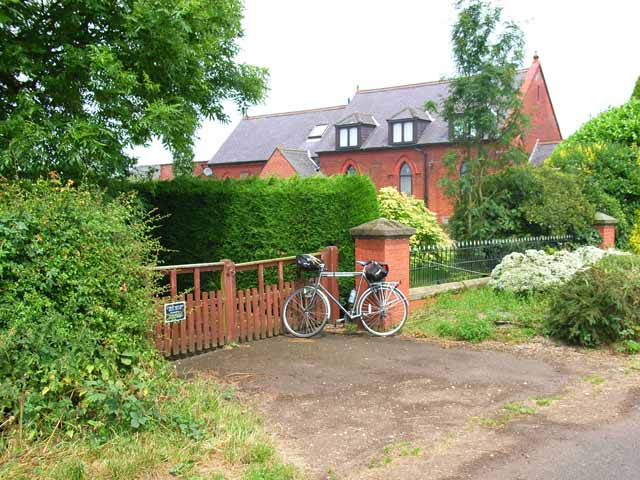
- Converted Methodist Chapel

- Location within Staffordshire
- Population: 510 (2011)
  - London: 113 miles (182 km)
- District: East Staffordshire
- Shire county: Staffordshire
- Region: West Midlands
- Country: England
- Sovereign state: United Kingdom
- Post town: Burton-upon-Trent
- Postcode district: DE13
- Dialling code: 01283
- Police: Staffordshire
- Fire: Staffordshire
- Ambulance: West Midlands
- UK Parliament: Burton

Hanbury is a rural village and civil parish 3.3 miles (5.3 km) west-north-west of Burton-on-Trent in Staffordshire, England. It is bounded to the north by the River Dove.

== History ==
=== St Werburgh's Church ===
Hanbury's Church of St Werburgh (Church of England) is Grade II* listed.

Two Anglo-Saxon crosses are built into the west wall adjacent to the south door.

Most of the church is 13th-century work on a 12th-century core with some 15th-century stone facings. Rebuilt north and south aisle extensions date from 1824 and 1869 and the chancel from 1862 is by Hine and Evans of Nottingham. Materials consist of coursed and finely dressed sandstone blocks; lead roofs to the nave and aisles, hidden behind parapets; and Welsh slate roofs to the chancel with verge parapets. Five 14th-century levels form the tower: the top stage was entirely rebuilt to the incumbent's own design in 1883. Strings engraved in stone mark off the two upper stages, and diagonal buttresses are fixed to three stages; there are pinnacles and gargoyles at the angles and the parapet is crenellated with a fretted arcade frieze of pointed arches below. Paired bell-chamber openings with two lights and a panel tracery are placed over similar single windows to the lower stage. Five lights make up the pointed west window in two tiers, with four-centred arch doors below. A niche was set in the south side first stage of 1842 containing a statue of St Werburgh, with a pointed door below. A mainly 19th-century south aisle has four unequal bays alternately short/long and is divided by three-stage buttresses finished as gabletted pinnacles above the parapet roof, with three-light labelled pointed windows with panel tracery to all but one, which has two lights. There is a pointed labelled door to the building's left. Three bays form the clerestory, which has three three-light windows with panel tracery and three-centred labelled heads. Altered in 1870, the north aisle is similar to the south.

A significantly different style is used in the chancel, most noticeable in the steeply pitched roof and decorated masonry windows; this runs to three bays supported by two-stage buttresses. Two-light pointed windows (but a single light to the south-west corner) are to each of the three bays. Against the inner buttress of the east bay is the priest's door. Five lights (main panes) make up the pointed east window and a vestry is to the north. A painted diagonally boarded roof and painted walls depict religious scenes, all in reasonably subdued colours.

Four bays make up the nave with double-chamfered pointed arches and moulded capitals on round columns, Norman to the north and replica to south. The chancel arch is pointed and the nave roof of cambered and moulded ties with painted bosses is dated 1698 but is apparently two centuries older. The pulpit, of stone and alabaster, is in the style of Street, circular on clustered columns with a trefoil-headed blind arcade on marble columns around its sides. Coloured local alabaster and imported marble form the font, which is square on four extended columns and built over the carved Norman font, still discernible within the present font. There are remnants of medieval glass in the south aisle and south-east window. In 1894 the east and west windows were made by Ward and Hughes. Lower parts of the tower walls have purpose-made glazed tiles of 1883 as a family memorial.

Sir John de Hanbury (d. 1303) has an alabaster monument in the east of the south aisle: a recumbent effigy tomb clasping a sword and with crossed legs and dog. This is possibly a later attempt by this Hanbury family to add credibility to their lineage, otherwise this would be the earliest alabaster in England.

The large alabaster chest tomb of Ralph Adderley (d. 1595) to the northeast of the chancel has three figures cut in the top slab of Ralph and his two wives, with moulded edges and sides with carved kneeling figures of children at the opposite end. Sir Charles Egerton (d. 1624) has a reclining alabaster figure in a moulded segmental-arch canopied niche. Puritan bust plaques are to Katherine Agard (d. 1620) and her daughter, Ann Woollocke, with ruffs and steeple hats, and to Dorothy Villiers (d. 1665). Sir John Egerton's (d. 1662) memorial is similar to the above Egerton monument, but with a damaged canopy; it is in the east corner of the north aisle. John Wilson's (d.1839) memorial is a neo-classical low-relief marble plaque depicting a seated woman in doric surrounds by Hollins. Sir John Cheyne, the rector from 1363 to 1391, has a brass plaque at the foot of the chancel steps showing a much-worn figure with a cassock, surplice, almace and cope.

=== 20th century ===
The RAF Fauld explosion, one of the largest artificial non-nuclear explosions in the world at the time, occurred within the civil parish in 1944.

== Localities ==
=== Coton in the Clay ===
This locality adjoins the River Dove and includes a steep knoll between much of it and the river, Row Hill; five listed buildings are here all at Grade II. Hanbury's village centre is 0.9 miles (1.4 km) to the south. This hamlet is at an elevation of 61m AOD whereas the village centre of Hanbury is at the start of a steep westward valley at the source of the Salt Brook at 134m AOD.

== Culture and community ==
Three circular Hanbury Walks link the village's public house, The Cock Inn, to Tutbury Castle, Draycott in the Clay and to the adjacent eastern hills on the shortest of the three walks.

Hanbury Parish Council operate a village website with events, meetings and information of the facilities offered by the third-tier local council.

Draycott and Hanbury Cricket Club play in Knightsfield Road, Hanbury.

== See also ==
- Listed buildings in Hanbury, Staffordshire
