= Listed buildings in Hanbury, Staffordshire =

Hanbury is a civil parish in the district of East Staffordshire, Staffordshire, England. It contains 21 buildings that are recorded in the National Heritage List for England. Of these, one is listed at Grade II*, the middle grade, and the others are at Grade II, the lowest grade. The listed buildings in the parish are houses, including a former manor house and a small country house, cottages, farmhouses and farm buildings, a church and its lych gate, a school, an Air Ministry laboratory, and four mileposts.

== Key ==
Grade	Criteria
II*	Particularly important buildings of more than special interest
II	Buildings of national importance and special interest

== Buildings ==
Name and location	Photograph	Date	Notes	Grade
St Werburgh's Church; 52.84858°N 1.74777°W		13th century	The church has a 12th-century core, it was altered in the 15th century, the aisles and chancel were rebuilt in the 19th century, and the top stage of the tower was rebuilt in 1883. The church is built in sandstone, and the roofs are in lead on the nave and aisles, and Welsh slate on the chancel. The church consists of a nave with a clerestory, north and south aisles, a chancel, and a west tower. The tower has five stages, diagonal buttresses, gargoyles and pinnacles at the angles, and an embattled parapet with a fretted arcade frieze. At the west end is a five-light window and a niche containing a statue of St Werburgh, and the east window also has five lights.	II*
The Thatched Cottage; 52.85963°N 1.74846°W		Mid-16th century	The cottage, which was altered in the 17th and 19th centuries, is timber framed with rendered infill, and has a thatched roof. There is a single storey and an attic, two bays, and a lean-to on the left with a hipped roof containing a doorway. The windows are casements, and there are two swept dormers.	II
Fauld Hall; 52.85797°N 1.72713°W	—	Late 16th century	A manor house that has been altered and extended. The early part is timber framed with brick infill, the later parts are in brick, and the roof is tiled. There are two storeys and attics. The original plan was a hall and cross-wing, and this has been much altered. On the front is a two-storey gabled porch, the upper storey jettied. The windows are casements, and there are gabled dormers.	II
Barn, Old Hall Farm; 52.85936°N 1.74962°W	—	Late 16th century	The barn, which was altered and restored in the 20th century, is timber framed on a concrete plinth, with infill in concrete and brick, the rear is in brick, there is weatherboarding on the left gable end, and the roof is tiled. There are three bays, and the openings include fixed-light windows, a bottom-hung casement vent, and doorways.	II
The Thatches; 52.84838°N 1.74841°W		Late 16th or early 17th century	The house was altered and extended in the 20th century. The early part is timber framed, rebuilding and the later parts are in brick painted to resemble timber framing, and the roof is thatched. There is one storey and an attic, and five bays. On the front is a thatched gabled porch, the windows are casements, there is a bay window with a hipped thatched roof, and an eyebrow dormer.	II
Glebe House and Carriage Arch; 52.84812°N 1.74770°W		Late 18th century	A red brick farmhouse on a plinth with painted dressings, a string course, coved eaves, and a tile roof with verge parapets. There are two storeys and an attic, and three bays. The central doorway has a moulded surround, a radial fanlight, and a corbelled hood. The window above the doorway is square with a moulded architrave, and the other windows are small-paned casements with segmental heads. To the left is a 19th-century segmental coach arch with dentilled eaves.	II
Coton Hall; 52.85996°N 1.75233°W	—	c. 1790	A small country house, possibly with an earlier core, it is in rendered brick with a flat roof behind a parapet, and is in late Georgian style. It has a square plan, with an entrance front of five bays, the middle three bays protruding slightly, with a sill band. In the centre is a Tuscan doorcase with a pediment, and a doorway with a fanlight. The windows are sashes, in the upper floor they are tripartite with corbelled cornices, and in the ground floor are flat-roofed bay windows. The garden front has a recessed centre os two bays, flanked by three-sided bay windows. At the rear is a service wing with a slate roof.	II
The Old Vicarage; 52.84883°N 1.74910°W	—	Late 18th or early 19th century	The vicarage, later a private house, is in red brick on a plinth with a string course, a modillioned cornice, and a hipped slate roof. There are two storeys, an L-shaped plan, and a front of three bays. The windows are sashes, those in the ground floor are tripartite, with segmental heads, the central window has been converted into a French casement window.	II
Coulters Hill Farmhouse; 52.82478°N 1.76875°W	—	Early 19th century	The farmhouse is in red brick, rendered on the sides, with dentilled eaves, and a tile roof with verge parapets. There are three storeys and three bays. Steps lead up the central doorway that has a fanlight and a corbelled pitched hood, and the windows are casements.	II
Hanbury Park Farmhouse; 52.83028°N 1.74673°W	—	Early 19th century	The farmhouse, built on an earlier core, is in red brick with a roof of blue tiles. There are three storeys, and an L-shaped plan, with a main block of three bays, and a lower wing of two bays. The bays are defined by giant pilasters rising to form round-headed arches with a string course at impost level. In the angle is a lean-to with a French casement window. The doorway has a fanlight, and the windows are casements.	II
Milepost at SK 163 257; 52.82888°N 1.75930°W		Early 19th century	The milepost is on the southwest side of the B5017 road. It is in cast iron and has a triangular plan and a sloping head. On the head is inscribed "MARCHINGTON" and on the sides are the distances in miles to Marchington, Sudbury, Uttoxeter, and Burton upon Trent.	II
Milepost at SK 174 246; 52.81892°N 1.74178°W		Early 19th century	The milepost is on the southwest side of the B5017 road. It is in cast iron and has a triangular plan and a sloping head. On the head is inscribed "MARCHINGTON" and on the sides are the distances in miles to Marchington, Sudbury, Uttoxeter, and Burton upon Trent.	II
Old Hall Farmhouse; 52.85950°N 1.74898°W		Early 19th century	The farmhouse is in red brick with a dentilled eaves course and a tile roof. There are three storeys, a square plan with compacted U-shaped ranges, and three bays. The central doorway has a fanlight and a gabled hood, and the windows are casements with segmental heads.	II
Stables, Old Hall Farm; 52.85932°N 1.74868°W	—	Early 19th century	The stables are in red brick with a tile roof, and have a single storey with a hay loft above. There are two doorways and a window, all with segmental heads, a loft opening, and casement vents. On the left gable end are external timber steps leading to the hay loft.	II
The Laurels; 52.85967°N 1.74822°W		Early 19th century	A red brick house with a tile roof, two storeys and three bays. The doorway and the windows, which are sashes, have segmental heads.	II
Outbuildings, Hanbury Park Farm; 52.82996°N 1.74641°W	—	Early to mid-19th century	The outbuildings consist of stables, a cowhouse, sheds, and storage-lofts. They are in red brick with hipped tile roofs, and form a U-shaped plan around a yard, open to the north. There are two storeys, and the openings include a central segmental-headed cart arch, casement windows, and doors.	II
St Werburgh's School; 52.84744°N 1.74554°W		1848	The former school is in red brick with stone dressings, it has a tile roof with verge parapets, and is in Tudor style. There is one storey and attics, and an H-shaped plan, consisting of a four-bay central range and projecting gabled wings. In the central range is a doorway with a Tudor arch, mullioned windows, and two gabled dormers. On the roof is a square bell tower surmounted by an octagonal bellcote with a small Tudor-arched opening in each face. The gable ends contain mullioned and transomed windows.	II
Milepost near Eland Brook; 52.84072°N 1.77487°W		19th century	The milepost is on the southwest side of the B5017 road. It is hollow, in cast iron, and has a triangular plan and a sloping top. On the top is inscribed "MARCHINGTON" and on the sides are the distances in miles to Marchington, Sudbury, Uttoxeter, and Burton upon Trent.	II
Milepost at N.G.R. SK 15042733; 52.84313°N 1.77823°W		Mid- to late 19th century	The milepost is on the east side of the A515 road. It is in cast iron and has a triangular plan and a chamfered top. On the top is inscribed "MARCHINGTON" and on the sides are the distances in miles to Yoxall, King's Bromley, Marchington, Sudbury, Lichfield, and Ashbourne.	II
Lychgate, St Werburgh's Church; 52.84821°N 1.74756°W		Late 19th century	The lychgate at the entrance to the churchyard has a stone plinth, a timber framed superstructure, a shingle roof with cross finials. There are central triangular louvres with quatrefoil openings.	II
Former RAF Tatenhill Air Ministry Laboratory; 52.81892°N 1.76004°W		c. 1941	The building is in rendered red brick, with a roof of corrugated asbestos. There are two storeys and two bays, and a short lower extension on the left. The building has brick buttresses, and various openings, some with concrete lintels.	II
