= Spondon Flyer =

Bus service in England

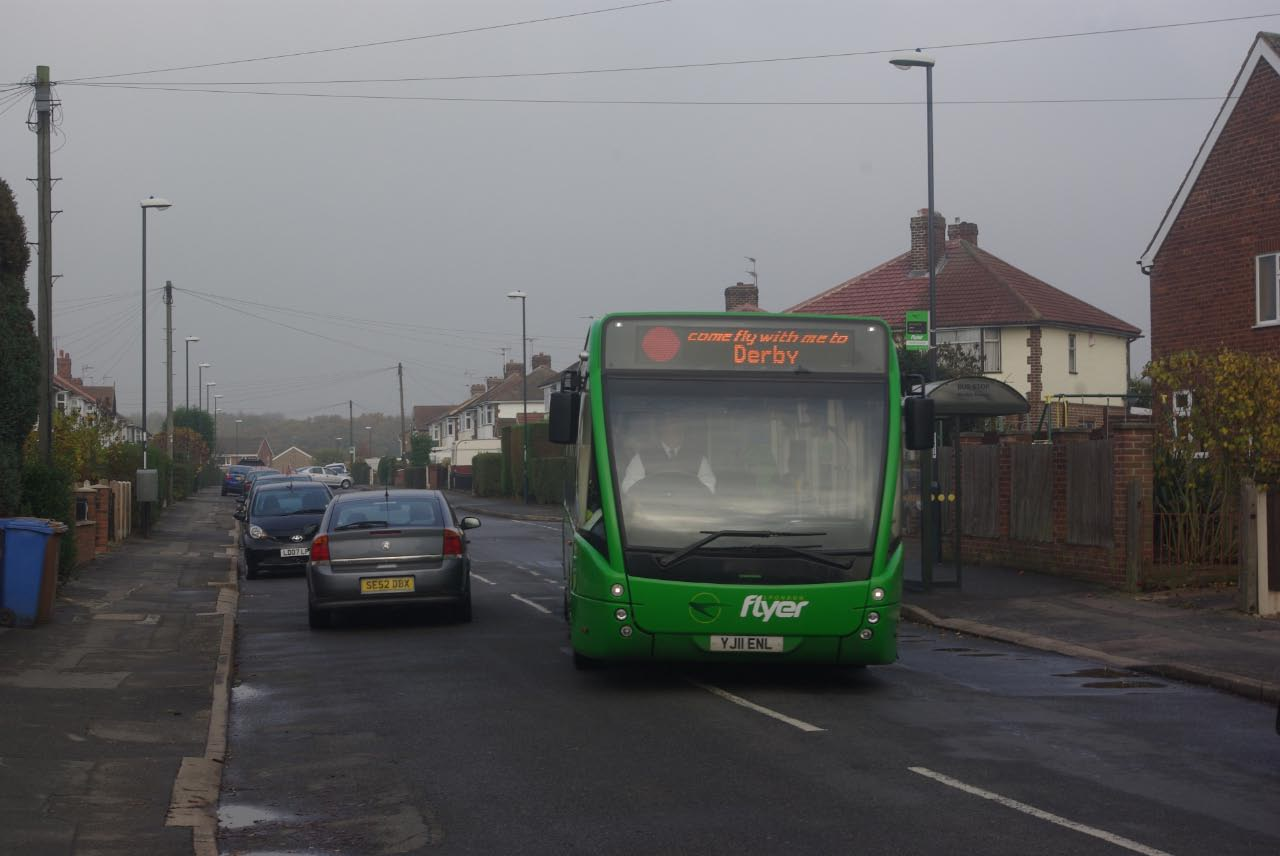
- A bus operating the service in 2011

Overview
- Operator: TrentBarton
- Garage: Derby
- Vehicle: Optare Solo SR
- Peak vehicle requirement: 3
- Status: Withdrawn
- Began service: 1994
- Ended service: November 2021 (suspended); September 2022 (withdrawn)

Route
- Communities served: Spondon; Derby
- Termini: Derby Bus Station

Service
- Frequency: Every 15 minutes

Spondon Flyer is a former bus service run by Trentbarton between 1994-2022. It linked the city of Derby to the suburb of Spondon.

== History ==
The Spondon Flyer was launched in 1994, the service was different to busses that Derby had seen before; the public wanted "clean, friendly and Frequent busses". The Spondon Flyer was the first bus service in the country to be given a distinctive brand as well as colour codes to indicate the direction the bus would traverse the route. It was also the first brand in the Trentbarton catalogue to provide the "Money back guarantee". The changes that were introduced on the Spondon Flyer were deemed to be successful and were subsequently rolled out onto other services.

The route remained relatively unchanged for most of its operational life with a 10 minute frequency and busses traveling round Spondon in either a clockwise or anti-clockwise direction. Trentbarton made operational changes to the route in 2017 where the frequency was reduced to every 15 minutes and busses would now only operate in a single one-way loop around Spondon.

As a result of the COVID-19 pandemic several Trentbarton services were suspended in early 2020 this included the Spondon Flyer. On 23rd August 2020 a reduced service was reinstated however was again suspended from January 2021 to March 2021. Driver shortages were cited as the reason for another service suspension in November 2021 when the final service ran. The route remained suspended until July 2022 when Trentbarton announced the service would be permanently withdrawn. In a statement the company said that the route had been loss making for some time and had failed to attract enough riders even before the pandemic. Residents of Spondon made petitions to Trentbarton and took to talking to local newspapers and councillors to try and have some sort of service provided however the service was never reinstated.

== After the Spondon Flyer ==
A trial minibus service began on 27 March 2023 designed to link areas previously served by the Spondon Flyer to the main village centre called the SP1. It was complimented by a second service called SP2 which served areas of lower Spondon. The service ran for three months and was free to use this helped connect people to the village centre for shopping or onwards connections via the Ilkeston Flyer. The service ran from Monday to Friday and was operated by Derbyshire Community Transport and was considered a success. Despite this no further funding was allocated to the service.

In 2024 Trentbarton announced improvements to the Ilkeston Flyer service which had been suffering with delays and overcrowding partially due the withdrawal of the Spondon Flyer but also increased ridership due to fares being capped. This saw eight new Enviro200 MMC busses join the route with an increased frequency of every 10 minutes to improve the passenger experience. This improvement was partially paid for with money from the Department for Transports National Bus Strategy (BSIP).

In 2025 a new circular route was launched by Notts and Derby a sister company to Trentbarton. The route numbered "19" starts at Spondon station and follows the old Spondon Flyer route however terminating at Spondon station. The 19 runs alongside the re-routed Arriva services 20 and 21 which also received funding to increase services between Derby and Spondon however these routes do not run directly as the Spondon Flyer once did instead retain their original routings through Chaddesden. Funding for these three routes came from the National Bus Service Improvement Plan (BSIP).

== Route ==
The Spondon Flyer ran between Derby and Spondon following the A52 between the two in an effort to reduce journey times compared to services that ran through the neighbouring village of Chaddesden. At its peak departures could be up to every 10 minutes. On departure from the White Swan busses would either circle the village in a clockwise (Blue route) or anticlockwise (Red route) direction. Initially these were referred to as the red and blue routes as indicated on the front of the bus however the "red route" was later swapped to green.

The 2017 timetable update included some major updates to the Spondon Flyer, this included a frequency reduction to every 15 minutes and the clockwise blue route being withdrawn leaving busses circling one way round the village. The blue route would turn up Chapel Street however, in this time Derby City Council made this section of the road one way and also widened the pavement making two way traffic impossible.

== Fleet ==
When the route launched in 1994 a fleet of Optare Vectra's were used. Painted with a red top of the bus and cream around the bottom. The vehicles were used in service until 2003 when they were sold to Hulleys of Baslow. The known vehicles that were used were (M802 PRA, M803 PRA)

In 2003 four new Wright Solar's were introduced on the route, the vehicles were painted in a bright green livery, proudly displaying the new Trentbarton livery standard. The vehicles ran on the route until mid 2011 when Trentbarton provided new busses to elevate the passenger experience. All four vehicles were cascaded to the Ilkeston Flyer. The vehicles used were (632 FJ03 VWX, 633 FJ03 VXA, 634 FJ03 VXB, 635 FJ03 VXC)

In 2011 four new Optare Versa's were introduced on the route, the bright green colour scheme and ten minute frequency was retained and the slogan "Fly first class" was adopted, the busses were fitted with grey and green leather style seats. After their use on the Spondon Flyer they were displaced to the My15 service based out of Langley Mill. The vehicle's used were (806 YJ11 ENL, 807 YJ11 ENM, 808 YJ11 ENN, 809 YJ11 ENO)

In 2017 three Optare Solo SR's were introduced along with a branding update to fit with the recent upgrades to the Ilkeston Flyer. Having been cascaded from the Rushcliffe Villager. Only three vehicles were required due to the reduction in frequency and the route only following the anti-clockwise route around Spondon the vehicles remained in use until the route was withdrawn in 2022. After the Spondon flyer one vehicle (501 YD63 VDL) transferred to sister company Kinchbus whilst the remaining two (502 YD63 VDM & 503 YD63 VDN) remained at Trentbarton and were repainted into the "Mango spare" livery.
