= American Eagle (roller coaster) =

Wooden racing roller coaster

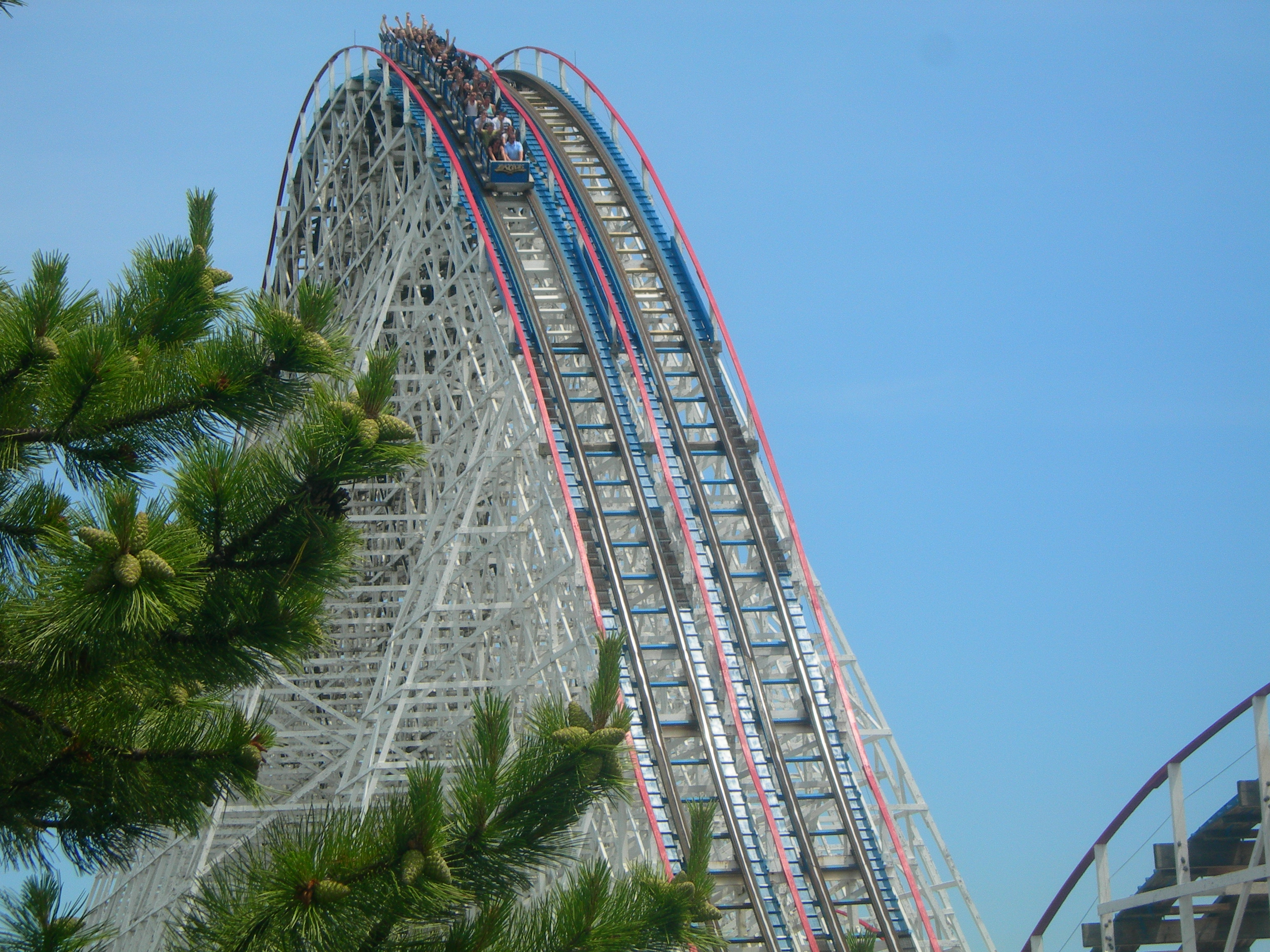
- Blue side crests the hill

Six Flags Great America
- Park section: County Fair
- Coordinates: 42.3646°N 87.9336°W
- Status: Operating
- Opening date: May 23, 1981
- Cost: $10 million

General statistics
- Type: Wood – Racing
- Manufacturer: Intamin
- Designer: Curtis D. Summers; James Figley; Leonard Wright
- Model: Wooden
- Track layout: Out and back
- Lift/launch system: Chain
	Red	Blue
Height	127 ft (38.7 m)	127 ft (38.7 m)
Drop	147 ft (44.8 m)	147 ft (44.8 m)
Length	4,650 ft (1,417.3 m)	4,650 ft (1,417.3 m)
Speed	66 mph (106.2 km/h)	66 mph (106.2 km/h)
Inversions	0	0
Duration	2:23	2:23
Max vertical angle	55°	55°
- Capacity: 1800 riders per hour
- Height restriction: 48 in (122 cm)
- Trains: 4 2-Blue 2-Red trains with 5 cars. Riders are arranged 2 across in 3 rows for a total of 30 riders per train.
- Must transfer from wheelchair
- American Eagle at RCDB; Pictures of American Eagle at RCDB

American Eagle is a wooden racing roller coaster located at Six Flags Great America theme park in Gurnee, Illinois. It was the first wooden roller coaster designed by Intamin of Switzerland and was built in 1981 by the contracting firm Figley-Wright at a cost of $10 million. While most of the records have since been broken, American Eagle had the longest drop and fastest speeds among wooden roller coasters when it debuted and is still recognized as a top racing coaster in the United States.

The ride is recognized by American Coaster Enthusiasts as a Landmark roller coaster, receiving the honor in 2025.

== History ==
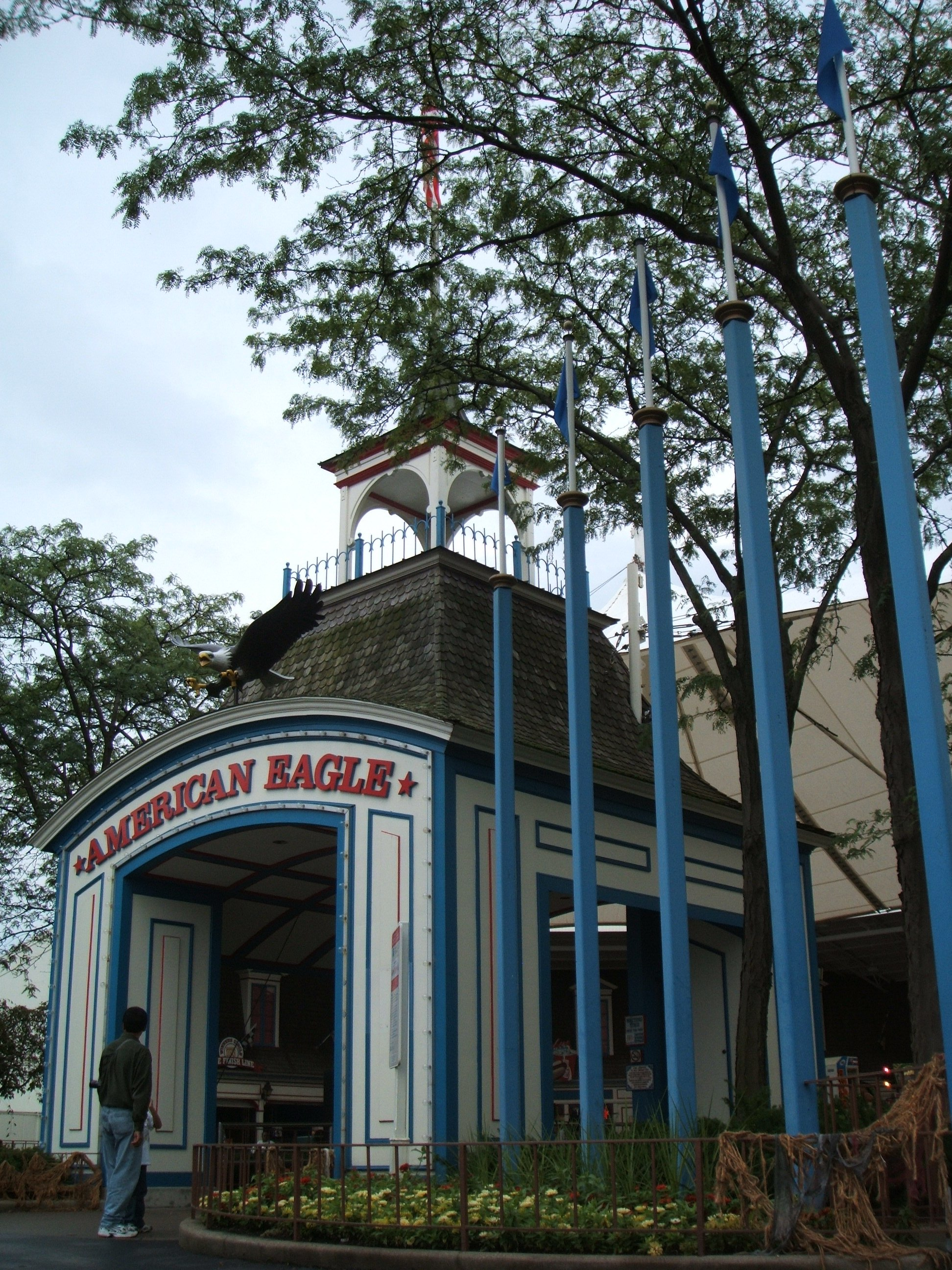
The Kidzopolis tent prior to 2007 was the entrance into American Eagle

Construction of American Eagle began in June 1980. The attraction was built with approximately 1,360,000 feet (410,000 m) of lumber, 129,720 bolts, and 30,600 pounds (13,900 kg) of nails. Supports are attached to approximately 2,000 concrete footings that average 1.5 feet (0.46 m) in diameter and are 4.5 feet (1.4 m) deep. American Eagle was painted with over 9,000 US gallons (34,000 L; 7,500 imp gal) of white paint and took over 20,000 man hours to build. American Eagle was designed by Curtis D. Summers, James Figley, and Leonard Wright. Marriott originally contacted John C. Allen to design the coaster, but he did not want to attempt it.

American Eagle cost $10 million to construct and opened to the public on May 23, 1981.

During the 2016 or 2017 season, American Eagle stopped racing. Instead, the red and blue side were alternated in operation. As one side dispatched, the other side loaded passengers.

However, in 2021, the red side exclusively operated while blue side was closed for slight retracking and refurbishment. In 2022, blue side reopened while the red side was closed for similar refurbishments. In 2023, the blue side did not operate while the red side did.

Prior to the 2024 season, both sides of American Eagle were announced to get chain lift replacements. American Eagle also received a brand new entrance. Additionally, new red, white, and blue lights were installed to project onto the ride.

In the 2024 season, the blue side operated exclusively until the middle of August, when red side opened for operation as well. The blue and red sides alternatively operated throughout the rest of the season.

On February 14, 2025, the American Coaster Enthusiasts recognized American Eagle and Shock Wave at Six Flags Over Texas as roller coaster landmarks for their lasting impact and continued operation. Its plaque ceremony was held on June 16, 2025.

For Six Flags Great America's 50th anniversary, the park announced American Eagle would begin dispatching both sides of the track simultaneously once more from June 20, 2026, through August 9, 2026; the ride had not raced since nearly 10 years prior.

== Ride experience ==
=== Queue ===
The queue area of the ride is located to the right of the Kidzopolis section of the park. Prior to 2006, guests would first walk through a large tent – originally used for a circus in the late 1970s – before reaching the queue. Approaching the station, the queue line splits, allowing guests to choose between riding the "Red Side" (left) and the "Blue Side" (right). Both sides offer similar ride experiences, although in 1991, 1996, 2002–2005, 2011 (August 5 – September 17 only), and for the fall of 2013, the Blue Side ran its trains backward. Guests then enter the ride platform from their track's side of the station.

=== Layout ===
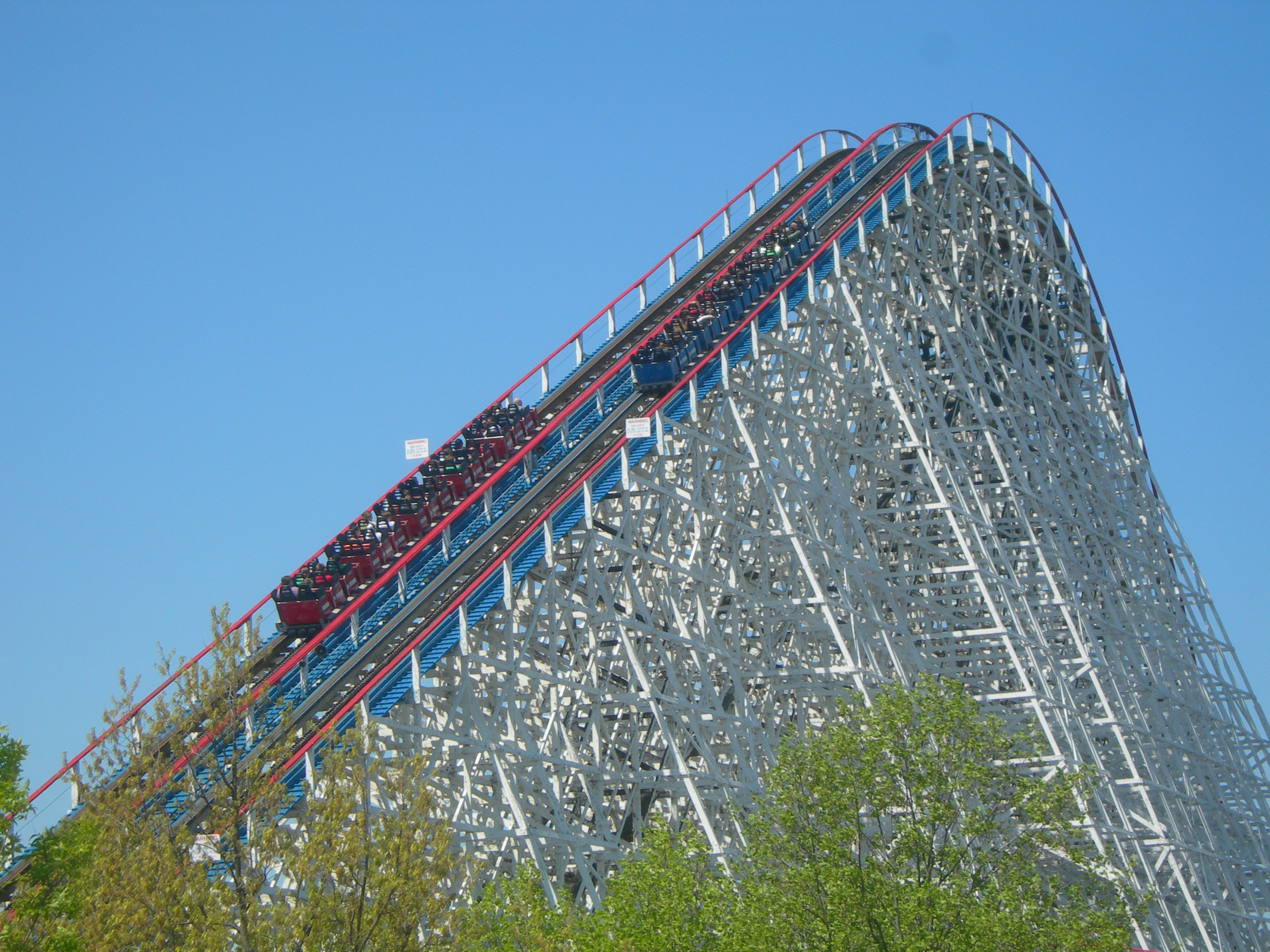
Eagle's 127-foot-tall (39 m) lift hill.

After boarding is complete, the red and blue trains are dispatched simultaneously, turning 200 degrees in opposite directions from one another as they proceed toward the chain lift hill. The trains join up again side-by-side on the lift hill behind the station as they begin their ascent. Upon reaching the top, the trains slowly make their way toward the edge before careening down the first drop, reaching speeds up to 66 mph (106 km/h). This is followed by two smaller air time hills before traveling upward and leveling out into a set of trim brakes at the far end of the out-and-back layout.

Here, the trains are slowed as they enter a large 560-degree helix where they circle downward over a small marsh, gradually picking up speed along the way. The helix circles to the left, allowing the red train to pull away, since it is located on the inside track. The tracks finally separate upon exiting the helix at a high velocity. The blue train dips low close to ground level, picking up speed and making up for lost ground, while the red train rises up and passes over the blue train. Both trains turn right 20 degrees until they are running parallel with each other once more, though separated by the outbound tracks. The red train dips down after passing over the blue train, passing over two more airtime hills. Meanwhile, the blue train turns through the wooden supports and traverses only one hill. Both trains then rise into the massive wooden structure of the lift hill, encountering another set of trim brakes to slow them down. Each train then dives opposite each other into a final 360-degree helix. The blue train circles at a significantly smaller radius further making up ground it lost in the earlier helix. They exit the helix and ascend into the final brake run to determine the winner.

== Characteristics ==
Located in the County Fair section of the park, American Eagle is a dual-track wooden racing coaster that spans almost the entire southern edge of the park. Some of the hallmarks of the coaster's out-and-back design include its 560-degree helix at the turnaround point and a 55-degree first drop that dips 20 feet (6.1 m) below ground level. An original design feature was a set of holding brakes that would perch trains at the top of the lift hill for a brief moment to give riders a bird's-eye view of the impending, 147-foot (45 m) drop. Use of the holding brakes was short-lived, however, and they were eventually removed from the track altogether.

=== Trains ===
The ride was also originally designed to run with a total of six trains; however, that number has since been reduced to four (two per track). American Eagle uses three-bench, five-car trains built by the Philadelphia Toboggan Company. The trains were originally designed with single-position lap bars but are now equipped with individual lap bars and seatbelts, making the trains on both American Eagle and Viper similar.

== World records ==
=== Previous world records ===
- Fastest roller coaster until 1988 (7 years)
- Largest drop on a roller coaster until 1988 (7 years) (succeeded by Shockwave)
- Tallest wooden roller coaster until 1985 (4 years)
- Fastest wooden roller coaster until 2000 (19 years)
- Largest drop on a wooden roller coaster until 1989 (8 years) (succeeded by Hercules at Dorney Park & Wildwater Kingdom)

=== Current world records ===
- Fastest racing wooden roller coaster
- Longest racing wooden roller coaster
- Tallest racing wooden roller coaster
- Largest drop on a racing wooden roller coaster

== Incidents ==
- September 9, 1984: Seven guests were hospitalized after two trains collided in the station.
- September 7, 1997: Four guests were slightly injured after the second and third cars on the blue train separated and collided on the brake run.
- May 22, 2002: An 11-year-old girl was taken to the hospital due to suffering a brain hemorrhage after riding the coaster.

Preceded by Colossus	World's Tallest Wooden Roller Coaster; May 1981 – July 1985	Succeeded by Le Monstre
Preceded by The Beast	World's Longest Roller Coaster Drop; May 1981 – April 1987	Succeeded by Shockwave
Preceded by The Beast	World's Fastest Roller Coaster; May 1981 – March 1988	Succeeded by Bandit
Preceded by The Beast	World's Fastest Wooden Roller Coaster; May 23, 1981 – March 14, 1992; 1994 – April 28, 2000	Succeeded by Rattler
Preceded by Rattler	World's Fastest Wooden Roller Coaster; May 23, 1981 – March 14, 1992; 1994 – April 28, 2000	Succeeded by Son of Beast
