= National Amusement Devices =

American miniature train manufacturer

National Amusement Devices in Dayton, Ohio was an American construction company founded in 1919 as the Dayton Fun House by Aurel Vaszin. Based on research, they built a 2-foot gauge miniature train that could be either gasoline or electric powered. This resembled a typical standard-gauge center cab electric train as early as 1922. Vaszin was an early environmental idealist and really pushed the idea of electric powered trains, as safer and less polluting.

A young mechanical engineer by the name of Frank Williams joined the Dayton Fun House in the mid-1920s, and later so did his dad and his son. They greatly improved on the concepts that had been previously developed. After World War II the Fun House began attracting worldwide recognition, and supplying amusement parks elsewhere. They changed their name to "National Amusement Device Co." (or NAD) and operated under that name for three decades.

They designed some of the popular early miniature trains used in amusement parks around the country. Their most popular and recognizable model was the "Century Flyer", supplied to various amusement parks and for children's rides. From the 1940s to the 1960s, NAD also built some full-size rollercoasters, many designed by John Miller. These were mostly wooden, and as of 2022, only 3 still exist and operate today.

== Famous rides ==
In addition to building trains and components for amusement parks, NAD also built entire rides, including some unique roller coasters. As of 1959, they claimed to have built more than 400 full roller coasters.

Some of their famous rides include:

- A mile-long roller coaster (name currently unknown) in Guatemala City, Guatemala. Operated from 1953 – 1960. It was a ravine coaster, built from cypress and pine cut by hand from the nearby jungle, reported by Billboard Magazine to be 2400 feet long, and it has been said "workers had to dig 38 feet out of the side of a mountain to get the right grade." Unfortunately, it lasted only a few years before a new government used it for firewood.
- The "Big Dipper" at Camden Park, in Huntington, West Virginia, was built in 1958. The Big Dipper features original Century Flyer cars with working headlights, and a classic figure-eight track design. The ride's name refers to a big dip measuring almost the full height of the roller coaster after the first turn. A second, shallower dip leads into an unlit tunnel, from which the cars emerge shortly before returning to the pavilion to let off passengers. The "Big Dipper" and "Little Dipper" (also built by NAD and located at Camden Park) are both still in operation, as of 2015, running with no seat belts and manual brakes. Although John A. Miller is often credited with designing the "Big Dipper" at Camden Park, he, in fact, did not. The confusion lies with the common name of the coaster, in that he designed three other coasters also named "Big Dipper", located in Aurora, OH (1925), Blackpool, England (1923), and Chicago, IL (1920). The Camden Park coaster was actually designed with the help of Aurel Vaszin, the founder and owner of NAD.
- The "Roller Coaster", 110' high and 5000' long. It was billed as the world's largest roller coaster in 1964. Vaszin designed and developed this for La Feria Chapultepec Mágico in Mexico City, Mexico. Nowadays, this roller coaster was standing but not operating after an accident at the park in 2019. In April 2022, works began to demolish the structure as La Feria de Chapultepec is expected to reopen with new attractions with Mexico City as theme, and will be known as "Parque Aztlán".
- The "Fairyland Wildcat" coaster in Kansas City. Vaszin designed this and was on board during its maiden voyage on June 10, 1968.

== Sale and change to International Amusement Devices ==
NAD was sold to Bill Roose, son of George Roose of Cedar Point, in April 1973. The name was changed at that time to International Amusement Devices Inc, based out of Sandusky, Ohio. From this point on they specialized in park design and brokering rides. Vaszin stayed on as a consultant until his death in 1979. IAD was later run by Eugene K. Feerer.
