= The Beast (roller coaster) =

Wooden roller coaster at Kings Island

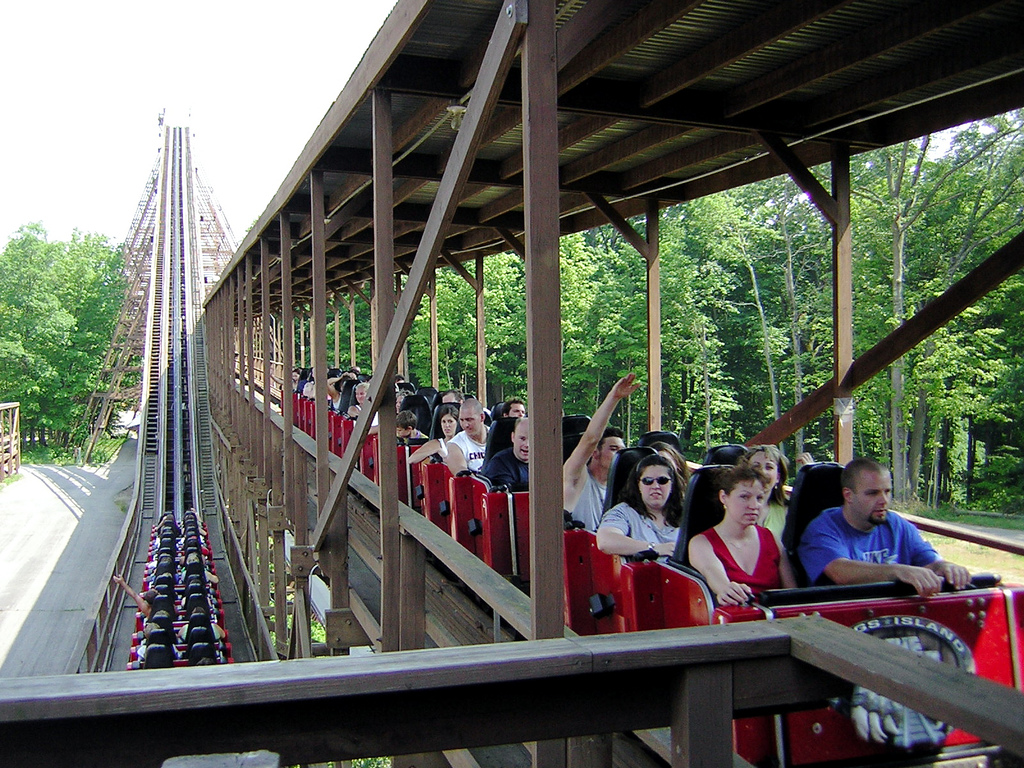
- The Beast’s lift hill and brake run

Kings Island
- Location: Kings Island
- Park section: Rivertown
- Coordinates: 39.3402°N 84.2660°W
- Status: Operating
- Soft opening date: April 13, 1979
- Opening date: April 14, 1979
- Cost: $3.2 million (Note: Some sources cite an alternate figure of $3.8 million.)

General statistics
- Type: Wood
- Manufacturer: Kings Island
- Designer: Al Collins; Jeff Gramke
- Track layout: Terrain
- Lift/launch system: 2 chain lift hills
- Height: 110 ft (34 m)
- Drop: 141 ft (43 m)
- Length: 7,361 ft (2,244 m)
- Speed: 64.78 mph (104.25 km/h)
- Inversions: 0
- Duration: 4:10
- Max vertical angle: 53°
- Capacity: 1,200 riders per hour
- G-force: 3.6
- Height restriction: 48 in (122 cm)
- Trains: 3 trains with 6 cars; riders arranged 2 across in 3 rows for a total of 36 riders per train
- Fast Lane available
- The Beast at RCDB

The Beast is a wooden roller coaster located at Kings Island amusement park in Mason, Ohio, United States. Designed and manufactured in-house for approximately $3 million, the ride opened in 1979 as the tallest, fastest, and longest wooden roller coaster in the world. Decades later, it is still the longest, spanning 7,361 feet (2,244 m) across 35 acres (14 ha) of hilly terrain. Two lift hills contribute to the ride's duration of more than four minutes, which also ranks as one of the longest among roller coasters. A refurbishment in 2022 increased the angle of the first drop and lengthened the ride by two feet (0.61 m).

The Beast was designed over the course of two years without assistance from scientific calculators or computers. Lead engineers Al Collins and Jeff Gramke consulted with well-known coaster architect John C. Allen, who shared design formulas and strategies to assist during development. Issues discovered during early testing delayed plans to build an enclosure over the helix finale until 1980. Ruth Voss, the park's public relations manager who would often overhear construction crews calling it "a beast of a project", is credited with coming up with the ride's name in early 1979.

The record-breaking coaster was well received at a press event preview held on April 13, 1979. Since its opening, The Beast has consistently ranked in the top ten among wooden coasters in the annual Golden Ticket Awards publication from Amusement Today. It has also earned a favorable reputation across the industry, including praise from American Coaster Enthusiasts (ACE), which held one of its first official events at Kings Island in 1979. ACE awarded the ride its Roller Coaster Landmark designation in 2004. After more than 40 years, it also remains one of the most popular rides at Kings Island, having accommodated over 54 million riders.

== History ==
Ruth Voss, public relations manager for Kings Island amusement park, issued a press release on July 10, 1978, announcing plans for a new roller coaster. The statement read, "Kings Island Family Entertainment Center will open America's champion roller coaster in the spring of 1979." It was the first official announcement from the park, who had been secretly planning the new ride for three years. Looking to replicate the national exposure received from popular rides such as The Racer and record-breaking events including Evel Knievel's nationally televised bus jump in 1975, Kings Island sought to keep the momentum going by introducing another record-breaking attraction.

Original plans focused on building a replica of the Shooting Star, a popular roller coaster which once operated at Coney Island in Cincinnati. Charles Dinn – director of the Kings Island's construction, maintenance and engineering division – had recorded measurements of the Shooting Star's layout and dimensions prior to its demolition in 1971. The park later selected an area near The Racer where the replica would be built. Eventually, park management decided to suspend plans for the Shooting Star replica in favor of building a bigger design. The Shooting Star would later be resurrected as Mighty Canadian Minebuster at Canada's Wonderland, which opened in 1981. For the 1979 coaster, Kings Island set a goal to build an attraction that would transcend the Shooting Star's nostalgia and appeal to a wider audience.

=== Design and construction ===
A wooded area in the southeast corner of the park spanning 35 acres (14 ha) was selected as the site for the new project. The area's naturally occurring, rugged terrain consisted of cliffs, hills, and ravines. Utilizing the landscape, as opposed to leveling it, saved money and allowed for more investment in the layout itself. Beginning in 1976, chief engineer and surveyor Al Collins, along with his assistant Jeff Gramke, spent two years researching and designing the new roller coaster with the help of Dinn and his team, who surveyed major roller coasters across the country. Collins and Gramke would progress through tens of thousands of formulas needed to produce record-breaking results without the assistance of scientific calculators or computers. "Everything had to be calculated by hand", recalled Gramke in 2014. John C. Allen, world-renowned coaster designer behind The Racer, was asked to lead the design but declined due to pending retirement. He shared design formulas, however, and acted as a consultant throughout development. Among his important contributions were the design of several components, including a tire-driven launch system that increased capacity above 1,000 riders per hour.

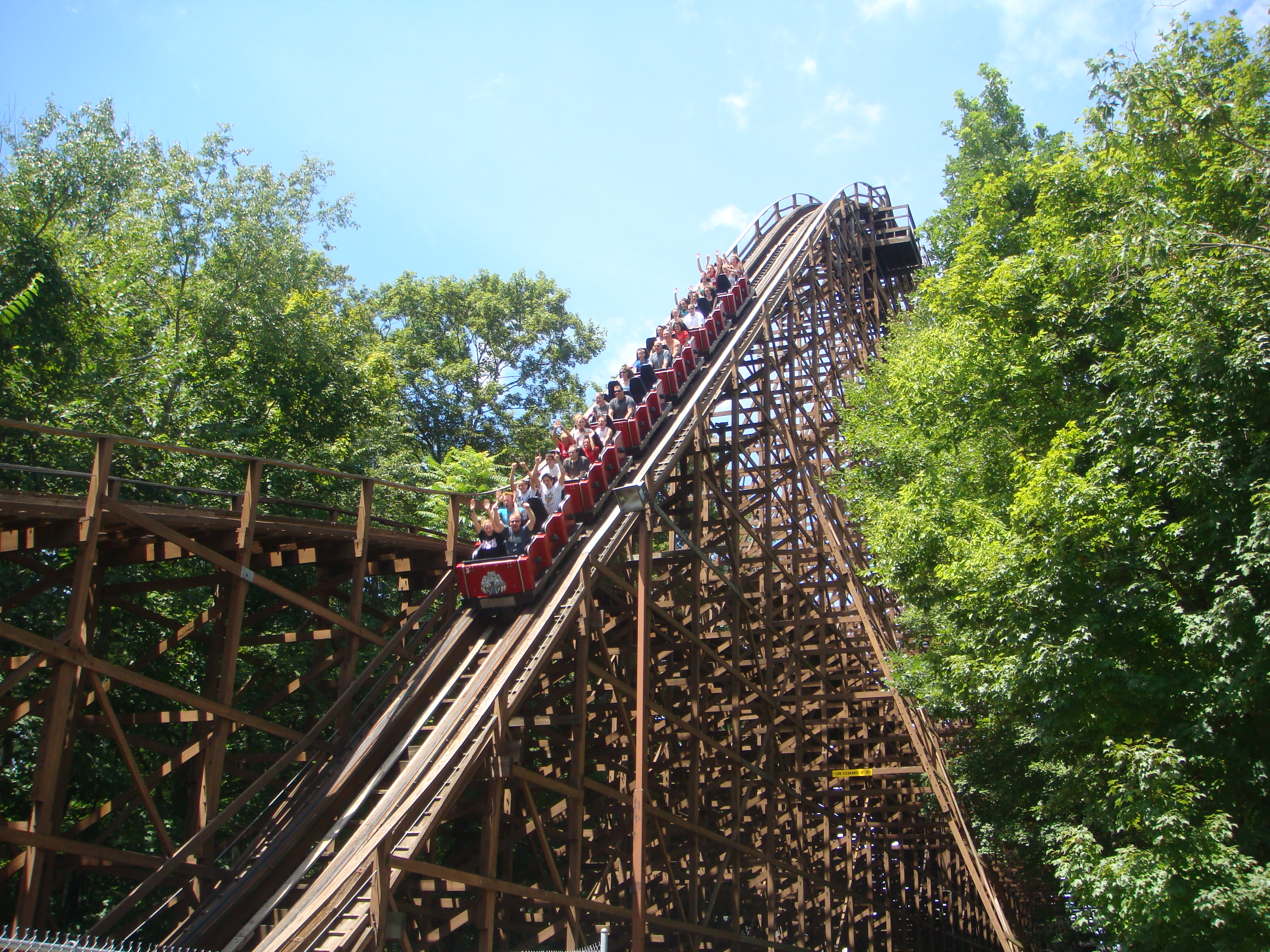
The first drop

The original plans for the Beast featured an airtime hill after the first tunnel followed by a left turn and a double down. After the second lift hill, passengers would approach a trick track element and a right-handed double helix. This helix is a mirror image of the one that is used today.

Primary design and construction was handled internally by Kings Island Engineering and Construction under the direction of Dinn. Part of the design work was subcontracted to Curtis D. Summers, Inc., a structural engineering and architecture firm located in Cincinnati. Summers was tasked with designing the roller coaster footings – underground, steel-reinforced concrete pillars that support the weight of the structure – as well as a cable system for the coaster's helix finale. The collaboration between Dinn and Summers would later lead to the pair teaming up and forming the Dinn Corporation, a construction firm that designed and built eleven coasters in the late 1980s and early 1990s.

The initial land grading prep work began in May 1978. Vertical construction of the coaster officially began the following month on June 10. By November 9, 1978, approximately 60 percent of the ride was complete, which included both of the ride's lift hills and its three tunnels. By March 1979, the remaining construction work was completed. Materials used throughout the project included 650,000 board feet (200,000 m) of lumber, 82,480 bolts, 5,180 washers, 37,500 pounds (17,000 kg) of nails, and 2,432 square yards (2,033 m^{2}) of poured concrete. The ride cost at least $3.2 million, equivalent to $15.8 million in 2025.

The Beast's final design featured two vertical drops of 135 and 141 feet (41 and 43 m), and it incorporated an overall elevation change of 201 feet (61 m). Its three underground tunnels were designed by Jim Kiosky, with one at the base of the first drop and two more approximately a third of the way into the track layout. The trains were manufactured by Philadelphia Toboggan Coasters, Allen's employer, who also implemented their "buzz bar" restraints. An early iteration of the train's design was based on the traditional mine car concept, which employed headlamps at the front of each train. Late changes scrapped the mine car theme in favor of a flame-colored paint scheme, and a sculpted logo was attached at the front in place of the headlamps. The logo, created by national advertising firm Lawler Ballard Little, would receive an award from The Advertising Club of New York later that year.

Early testing revealed issues in the design of the final helix track element. The amount of side acceleration the trains experienced was more than the design intended, so the entire helix was reconstructed with a wider diameter. The delay forced Kings Island to forego the enclosing of the helix, which would eventually happen the following off-season. Also at the first tunnel's exit, it was discovered that additional banking was needed to reduce stress on the structure. Engineers managed to complete the feat overnight, considering most of the coaster's track was relatively close to the ground and large cranes were not needed. In the late 1970s, engineers didn't have the benefit of computerized devices that could measure force, and they didn't use test dummies which are common in modern-day construction. Instead, crew members of The Beast's construction team had to board the ride for test runs and push the train back to the station whenever it stalled.

=== Opening and early modifications ===
Several months before its scheduled opening as construction was nearing completion, the attraction was still without a name. Voss often overheard construction crews referring to the project as "a monster" or calling it "a beast of a project". She pitched the idea of naming it "The Beast" to executives who unanimously agreed. To promote the new ride, an animated commercial was released, along with a number of radio contests that granted winners the opportunity to be among the first to ride. After more than three years of planning, design, and construction, The Beast opened to the public on April 14, 1979, the first day of Kings Island's 1979 operating season. At the time, The Beast was the tallest, fastest, and longest wooden roller coaster in the world.

Within a few years of the ride's opening, the configuration of the original trains were modified. They were originally longer, consisting of five cars with four rows each (20 rows), but the longer length negatively impacted navigation along the track and caused a conflict with the ride's safety control system. The trains were shortened to six cars with three rows each (18 rows), reducing the number of riders from 40 to 36. Guests waiting to board in the station will notice that some of the queue gates do not match up to the rows on the train, which is an anomaly that has been present in the station ever since this change was made. The ride also originally featured three underground tunnels, but the second and third were joined by the second season of operation. The previously unfinished double helix was also enclosed in time for the second season, resulting in the addition of two separate tunnels.

=== 2000–present ===
Kings Island unveiled Son of Beast in 2000, marketed as a "sequel" to The Beast, located in another area of the park. It became the tallest and fastest wooden roller coaster in the world, as well as the first modern-day wooden coaster to feature an inversion. Although Son of Beast set several new records, The Beast retained its wooden coaster records for length and ride duration. Son of Beast was demolished in 2012 following a series of incidents that halted operation in 2009.

In 2019, to commemorate the 40th anniversary of The Beast, each of its three trains were restored to their original "flame-themed" paint scheme, and the painted paw prints that once led up to the ride's entrance were also restored. Following the 2021 season, approximately 2,000 feet (610 m) of track was refurbished by The Gravity Group. Two of the ride's signature elements were reprofiled to provide a smoother ride. The first drop was increased from 45 to 53 degrees, affecting the transition from the first tunnel into the second drop, and the helix finale was modified to improve the distribution of force. 1,090 feet (330 m) was completely re-tracked, and the overall length of the ride was slightly increased by two feet (0.61 m) to 7,361 feet (2,244 m).

Additional retracking projects were conducted by The Gravity Group for the 2025 and 2026 seasons. In 2025, 1,600 feet (490 m) of track in the first half of the ride was replaced, resulting in the reprofiling of the second drop, the turn into the brake shed, and the entrance to the second tunnel. In 2026, the drop from the second lift hill and part of the helix were underwent refurbishment.

== Ride experience ==
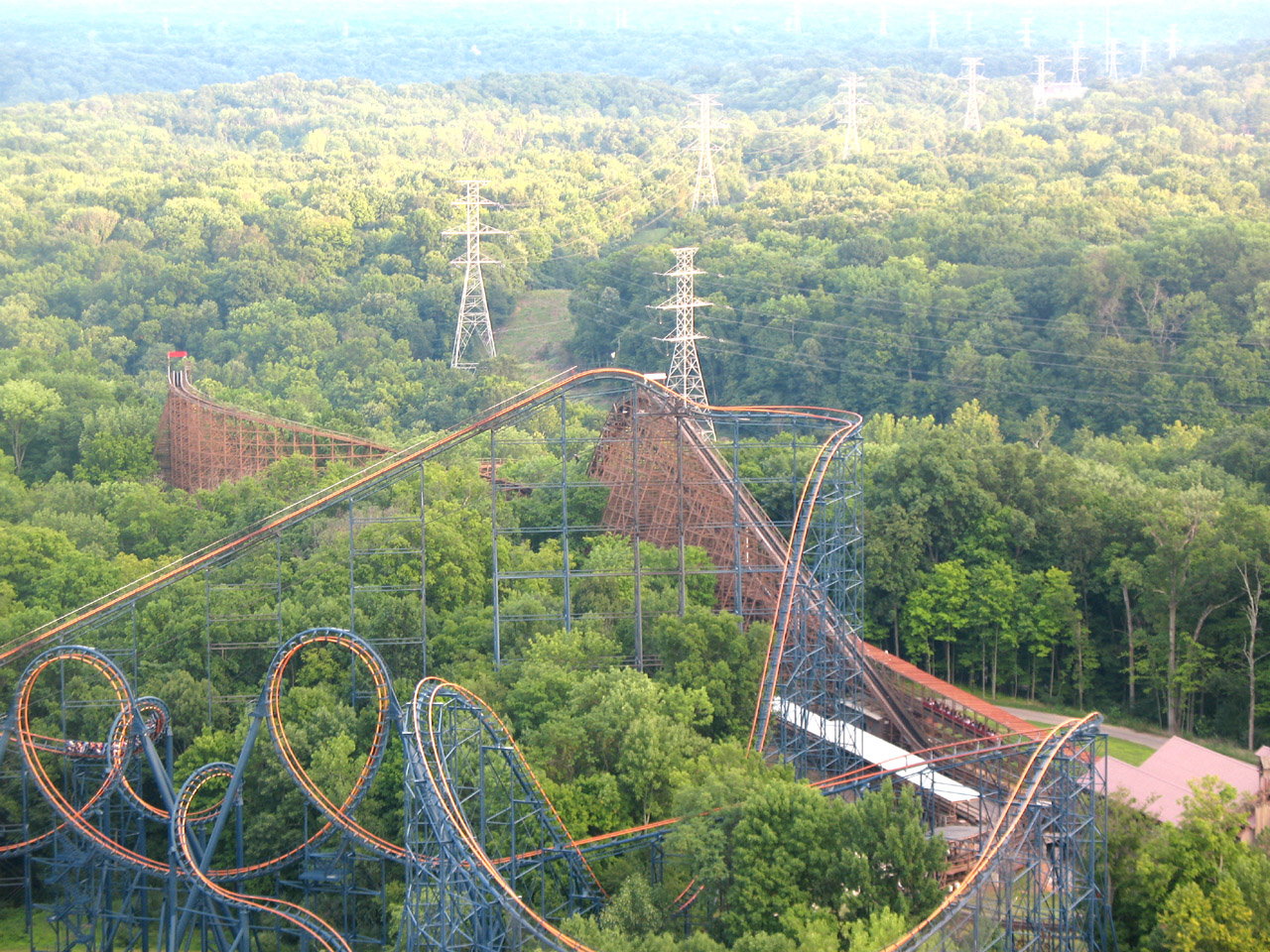
The Beast is located in the back of the park, near the plot of land previously occupied by Vortex.

=== Queue ===
After entering through the main entrance, guests proceed down a walkway that winds left. One or two smaller queue areas may be active depending on the number of guests waiting to ride. The path eventually leads up a ramp, in which signs are on display containing historical facts about The Beast. The inside of the station resembles an old mining facility. Warning signs are displayed stating to secure loose articles, along with promotional material with ominous warnings about the upcoming Beast encounter. Guests may proceed through one last sub-queue within the station before boarding. The Fast Lane queue (the parks skip-the-line option) leads directly to the station itself.

=== Layout ===
The train exits the station making a winding right turn and traveling through a switch track – used to divert trains to a covered storage area. A small prop area designed to resemble a mineshaft can be seen on the right as the train passes. A small left turn then leads the train into the first of two chain lift hills, along with a slow climb to 110 feet (34 m). Dramatic music is played over a speaker as a recorded announcement reminds guests to remain seated throughout the ride. After cresting the top, the train plunges 135 feet (41 m) at a 53-degree angle, entering a 125-foot-long (38 m) underground tunnel and passing an on-ride camera. This is followed by a sharp left turn into a 63-foot-tall (19 m) airtime hill with a 72-foot (22 m) drop at a 32-degree angle.

The train climbs upward, makes a right turn, and speeds into a covered brake shed. A series of magnetic trim brakes engage and slow the train as needed, followed by a turn to the right through a heavily wooded area. Veering left, the track enters a second tunnel that spans 269 feet (82 m). A quarter of the tunnel is underground, and the train exits above ground gaining speed and veering right, which leads into another hard right turn on a slight incline. The train descends downhill, rises uphill, and then passes over a set of trim brakes before entering the second lift hill.

After climbing 107 feet (33 m), the train turns left and begins a gradual drop at 18.5 degrees. The track tilts to the left as the train enters a double helix that features a highly banked turn to the left. The drop is the longest on the ride, measuring 141 feet (43 m). The signature double helix features two long tunnels and turns riders counterclockwise twice at high speeds while ascending. After exiting, the train dips through another small hill into the final brake run before returning to the station.

== Records ==
When it opened in 1979, The Beast set several world records among roller coasters including height, speed, and track length. It still retains the record for length among wooden coasters at 7,361 feet (2,244 m), which continues to be recognized by the Guinness Book of World Records. The Beast is also known to have one of the longest ride times at 4 minutes and 10 seconds.

The Beast has held world records for the following:

- Tallest wooden roller coaster at 110 feet (34 m), tied with Screamin' Eagle at Six Flags St. Louis when it opened
- Longest drop on a wooden roller coaster at 141 feet (43 m)
- Fastest wooden roller coaster at 64.8 mph (104.3 km/h)
  - If the brakes were applied, the maximum speed decreased to 51.2 miles per hour (82.4 km/h).
- Longest track length on a wooden roller coaster at 7,361 feet (2,244 m)

== Awards and rankings ==
The Beast has been well received since its debut. Members of American Coaster Enthusiasts (ACE), an organization that held one of its first official events at Kings Island in 1979, ranked the roller coaster as the "most outstanding thrill ride" in 1981. Additionally, the coaster ranked second on Roller Coaster magazine's list of the top ten rides in 1988. The Beast has also consistently ranked among the top wooden roller coasters in the world in the annual Golden Ticket Awards publication from Amusement Today, placing in the top 10 consecutively for more than two decades.

In 2004, ACE designated The Beast a Roller Coaster Landmark, and there is a plaque commemorating the achievement located near the main entrance to the ride. By 2019, The Beast had accommodated over 54 million riders, which at the time had ranked third among active Kings Island attractions.

Golden Ticket Awards: Top wood Roller Coasters
| Year | | | | | | | | | 1998 | 1999 |
|---|---|---|---|---|---|---|---|---|---|---|
| Ranking | | | | | | | | | 3 | 7 |
| Year | 2000 | 2001 | 2002 | 2003 | 2004 | 2005 | 2006 | 2007 | 2008 | 2009 |
| Ranking | 6 | 12 | 7 | 8 | 7 | 8 | 8 | 8 | 8 | 7 |
| Year | 2010 | 2011 | 2012 | 2013 | 2014 | 2015 | 2016 | 2017 | 2018 | 2019 |
| Ranking | 7 | 7 | 7 | 8 | 8 | 6 | 6 | 6 | 5 | 5 |
| Year | 2020 | 2021 | 2022 | 2023 | 2024 | 2025 | 2026 | | | |
| Ranking | N/A | 5 | 5 | 6 | 3 | 4 | 4 | | | |

NAPHA Survey: Favorite Wood Roller Coaster
| Year | 2005 | 2006 | 2007 |
|---|---|---|---|
| Ranking | 2 (tie) | 5 | 4 (tie) |

== Notes ==
| Preceded by Racer (Kennywood) | World's Longest Wooden Roller Coaster; April 1979 – present | Incumbent |
| Preceded by Gemini | World's Longest Roller Coaster Drop; April 1979 – May 1981 | Succeeded by American Eagle |
| Preceded by Screamin' Eagle | World's Fastest Roller Coaster; April 1979 – May 1981 | Succeeded by American Eagle |
