= Flyer (band) =

Flyer is a Croatian pop band from Zagreb, Croatia, formed in 1996. The members of the band are Petra Geber (lead vocals), Ivan Dumalovski (guitar), Ivo Dunat (bass), Zeljko Kozar (drums) and Mario Kovac (keyboards). In July 2003, they recorded a demo album to win the demonstrated band festival IDEMO among 50 other bands. In October 2003 they were signed by Croatia Records, and released their first single in April 2004.

== Albums ==
- ePOPeja (2005)
- Iluzija (2007)

== Singles ==
- Stanica prema suncu (2004)
- Zelim najvise (2004)
- O jednoj mladosti (2004), a cover of Josipa Lisac
- Tko si ti (2005)
- Tragovi u tragu (2005)
- Sve iza nas (2006)
- Sretna (2008), featuring Incognito
- Sve je u redu (2014)

== Awards ==
- Zlatna Koogla, best newcomer (2004)
- Otvoreni radio (Open Radio), Best new artist (2004)

== See also ==
- Jinx
