= Natasha Flyer =

American scientist

Natasha Flyer (born 1969) is an American earth scientist and applied mathematician known for her expertise on radial basis functions. She works as a research scientist in the Analytics and Integrative Machine Learning laboratory of the National Center for Atmospheric Research, and is also an affiliate of the Department of Applied Mathematics at the University of Colorado at Boulder.

== Education and career ==
Flyer majored in geological sciences at Northwestern University, graduating with a bachelor's degree there in 1993. She went to the University of Michigan for graduate study in atmospheric and space science, and completed her Ph.D. in 1999. Her dissertation was The Effect of Upper Level Features in The Atmosphere on Linear Theory and Linearized Benjamin-Davis-Ono Theory for Internal Gravity Waves.

She was a postdoctoral researcher at the National Center for Atmospheric Research from 1999 to 2000, and continued her postdoctoral study with the support of an NSF Postdoctoral Fellowship in the Department of Applied Mathematics at the University of Colorado at Boulder from 2000 to 2003. In 2003, she returned to the National Center for Atmospheric Research with a permanent appointment as a scientist.

== Book ==
With Bengt Fornberg, her husband, Flyer is the author of a book on radial basis functions, A Primer on Radial Basis Functions with Applications to the Geosciences (CBMS-NSF Regional Conference Series in Applied Mathematics 87, Society for Industrial and Applied Mathematics, 2015).
