= Flyer (1913 automobile) =

Defunct American motor vehicle manufacturer

The Flyer was an American brass era automobile manufactured in Mt. Clemens, Michigan by the Flyer Motor Car Company from 1913 to 1914. The Flyer had a monobloc four-cylinder water-cooled engine with selective transmission.
