= Ilkeston Flyer =

Bus route

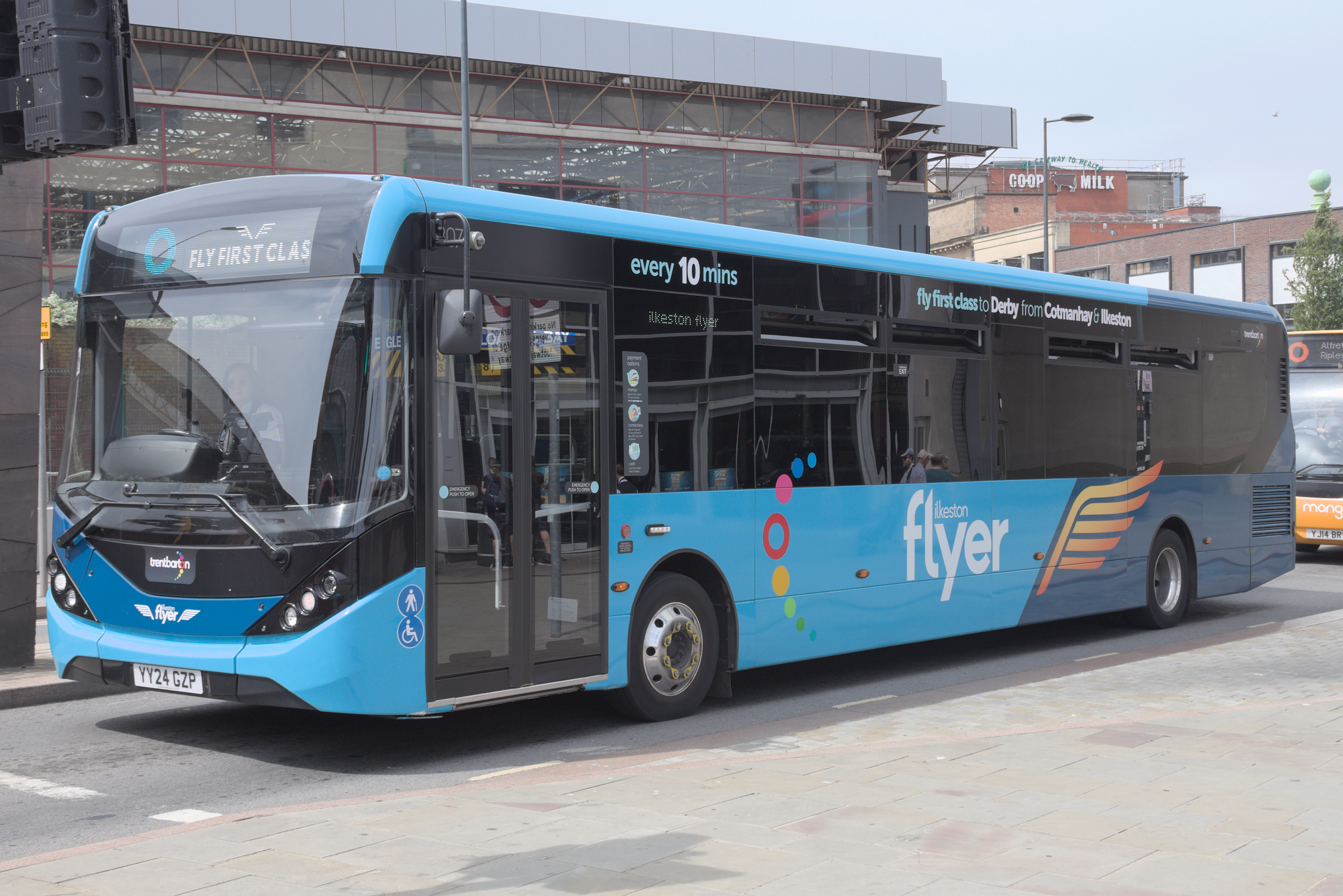
- Ilkeston Flyer branded ADL Enviro200 MMC at Derby in June 2025

Overview
- Operator: Trentbarton
- Vehicle: ADL Enviro200 MMC
- Status: Operating
- Began service: 1999

Route
- Start: Derby
- Via: Spondon, Ilkeston
- End: Cotmanhay

Service
- Frequency: Every 10 minutes (Note: The Ilkeston Flyer buses run every 10 minutes between Ilkeston and Derby, though the full route extending to Cotmanhay has now decreased to its initial frequency of every 20 minutes because of a lack of passengers using the Cotmanhay loop and to avoid vandalism.)

The Ilkeston Flyer is a bus route that operates between Cotmanhay and Derby via Ilkeston and Spondon. Launched in 1999, it is solely operated by Trentbarton and was formerly in partnership with Felix Bus Services prior to 2012.

== History ==
The route was introduced on 27 September 1999. Prior to 2011, the route operated on a half-hourly frequency with one bus per hour operated by Trent Barton and the other by Felix Bus Services. On 26 June 2011, Trentbarton added an additional bus per hour, increasing the frequency to every 20 minutes, including the fleet of buses now using Wright Solars instead of Optare Tempos. On 30 January 2012, Felix Bus Services' commercial routes were acquired by Wellglade Group, the parent company of Trentbarton. Trentbarton subsequently became the sole operator of the route.

In September 2013, the frequency was then increased to every 15 minutes (4 buses an hour) in response to Yourbus' Y3 extension to Cotmanhay, with buses running every 30 minutes on Sundays. Ilkeston Flyer would then be extended to Cotmanhay on 30 June 2014 to compete with the Y3 service, though the route would return to its original every 20 minutes frequency as a result.

On 26 March 2017, Ilkeston Flyer's fleet was replaced with Wright Eclipse buses equipped with USB sockets and free Wi-Fi, increasing the fleet of buses operating the route from four to six, in turn increasing the frequency from every 20 minutes to 15 again. Then on 1 September 2019, the fleet of buses went up from six to seven, further increasing the frequency to every 12 minutes, though it would be reverted to every 15 minutes due to the COVID-19 pandemic.

In December 2022, Ilkeston Flyer was temporarily diverted to avoid Cotmanhay Road after 18:00 following attacks on buses. The route would later return to its regular route a few days after the attacks.

Ilkeston Flyer's frequency would later be further increased to every 10 minutes on 14 July 2024, alongside the entire fleet being replaced with Alexander Dennis Enviro200 MMC models.
