= Screamin' Eagle =

Wooden roller coaster

Screamin’ Eagle
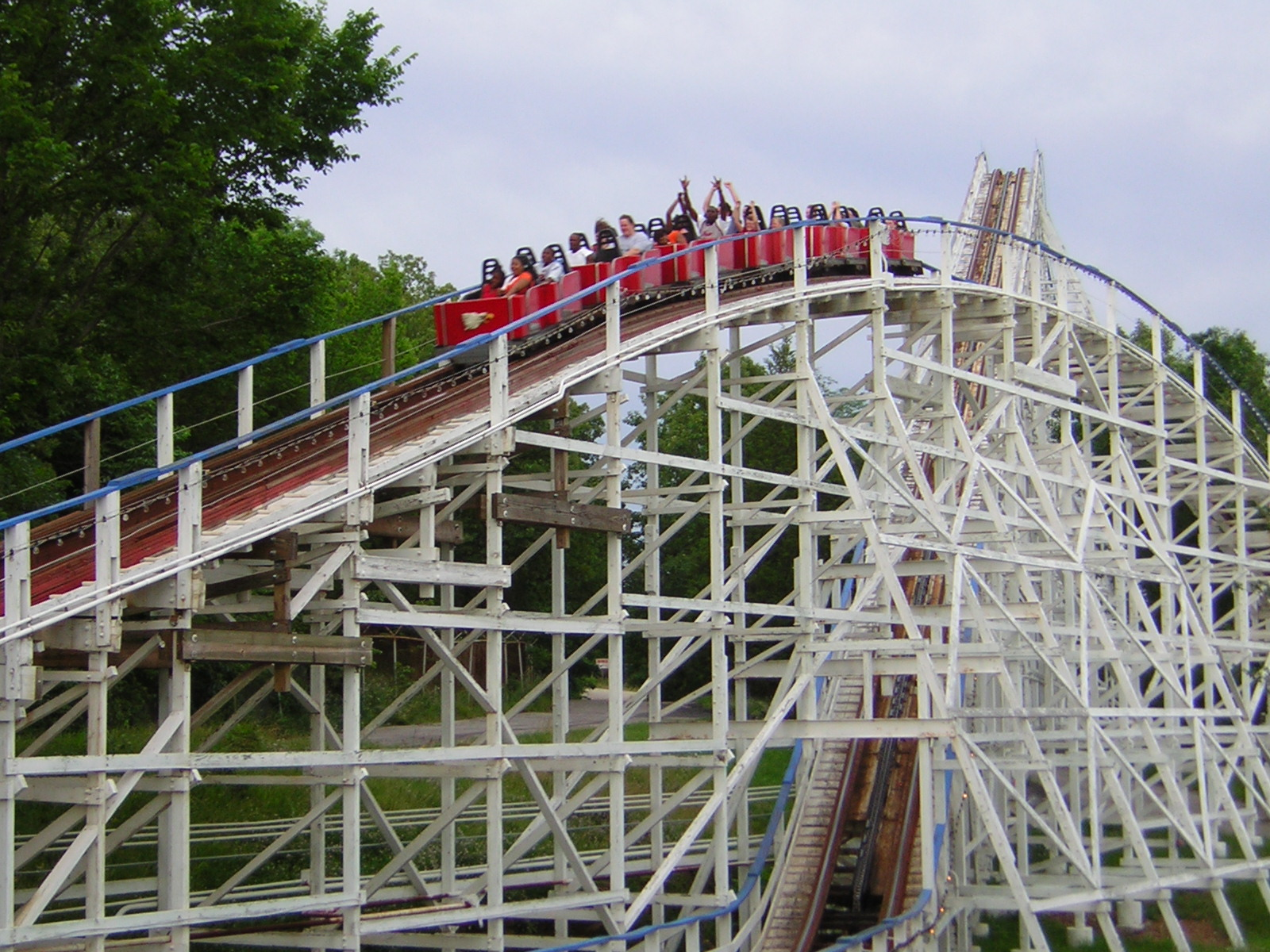

Mid America Adventure
- Location: Mid America Adventure
- Park section: Illinois
- Coordinates: 38°30′59″N 90°40′34″W
- Status: Operating
- Opening date: April 10, 1976; 50 years ago
- Cost: $3,000,000 (1976)

General statistics
- Type: Wood
- Manufacturer: Philadelphia Toboggan Coasters
- Designer: John C. Allen
- Track layout: Out and back
- Height: 110 ft (34 m)
- Drop: 92 ft (28 m)
- Length: 3,872 ft (1,180 m)
- Speed: 62 mph (100 km/h)
- Inversions: 0
- Duration: 2:30
- Height restriction: 46 in (117 cm)
- Trains: 2 trains with 6 cars; riders arranged 2 across in 2 rows for a total of 24 riders per train
- Fast Lane available
- Screamin’ Eagle at RCDB

Screamin' Eagle is a wooden roller coaster located at Mid America Adventure in Eureka, Missouri. When it opened on April 10, 1976 for America's Bicentennial celebration, Guinness World Records listed it as the largest coaster at 110 feet (34 m) high and as the fastest coaster at 62 mph (100 km/h). The ride is a modified 'L'-Shaped Out And Back. The Screamin' Eagle was manufactured by the Philadelphia Toboggan Coasters and was the last coaster designed by John Allen, who was a designer of roller coasters, believed a coaster should inspire awe, not only from a ride full of thrills, but also from its magnificent beauty. Originally Allen wanted to design a coaster to replace the Comet at Forest Park Highlands, but lack of funds prevented him from doing such. The Screamin' Eagle is reminiscent of the Comet, mirroring its L-shape, but to a much larger scale.

== Renovations ==
In 1990, the trains were replaced, the turns banked and a double up hill was removed from a section of the track. From 2003-2006 the Screamin’ Eagle received significant repairs such as painting, re-tracking and replacing of the control panel.

== Incidents ==
On September 18, 1976, 19 people suffered minor injuries after the ride train collided into the other that was parked at the station. Sixteen of them were treated at the park's first aid medical center, while three were taken to the hospital for further examination.

== Awards ==
Golden Ticket Awards: Top wood Roller Coasters
| Year | | | | | | | | | 1998 | 1999 |
|---|---|---|---|---|---|---|---|---|---|---|
| Ranking | | | | | | | | | 18 | – |
| Year | 2000 | 2001 | 2002 | 2003 | 2004 | 2005 | 2006 | 2007 | 2008 | 2009 |
| Ranking | – | – | – | – | – | – | – | – | 48 | 40 |
| Year | 2010 | 2011 | 2012 | 2013 | 2014 | 2015 | 2016 | 2017 | 2018 | 2019 |
| Ranking | – | – | – | – | – | – | 39 | 43 | 38 (tie) | 42 |
| Year | 2020 | 2021 | 2022 | 2023 | 2024 | 2025 | | | | |
| Ranking | N/A | 36 | 38 | 40 | 49 | – | | | | |

- Designated by the American Coaster Enthusiasts a "Coaster Landmark" on June 21, 2016

| Preceded by Coney Island Cyclone | World's Fastest Roller Coaster; April 1976–June 1978 | Succeeded by Colossus |
