= Century Flyer =

Railroad ride in Conway, Arkansas

- U.S. National Register of Historic Places
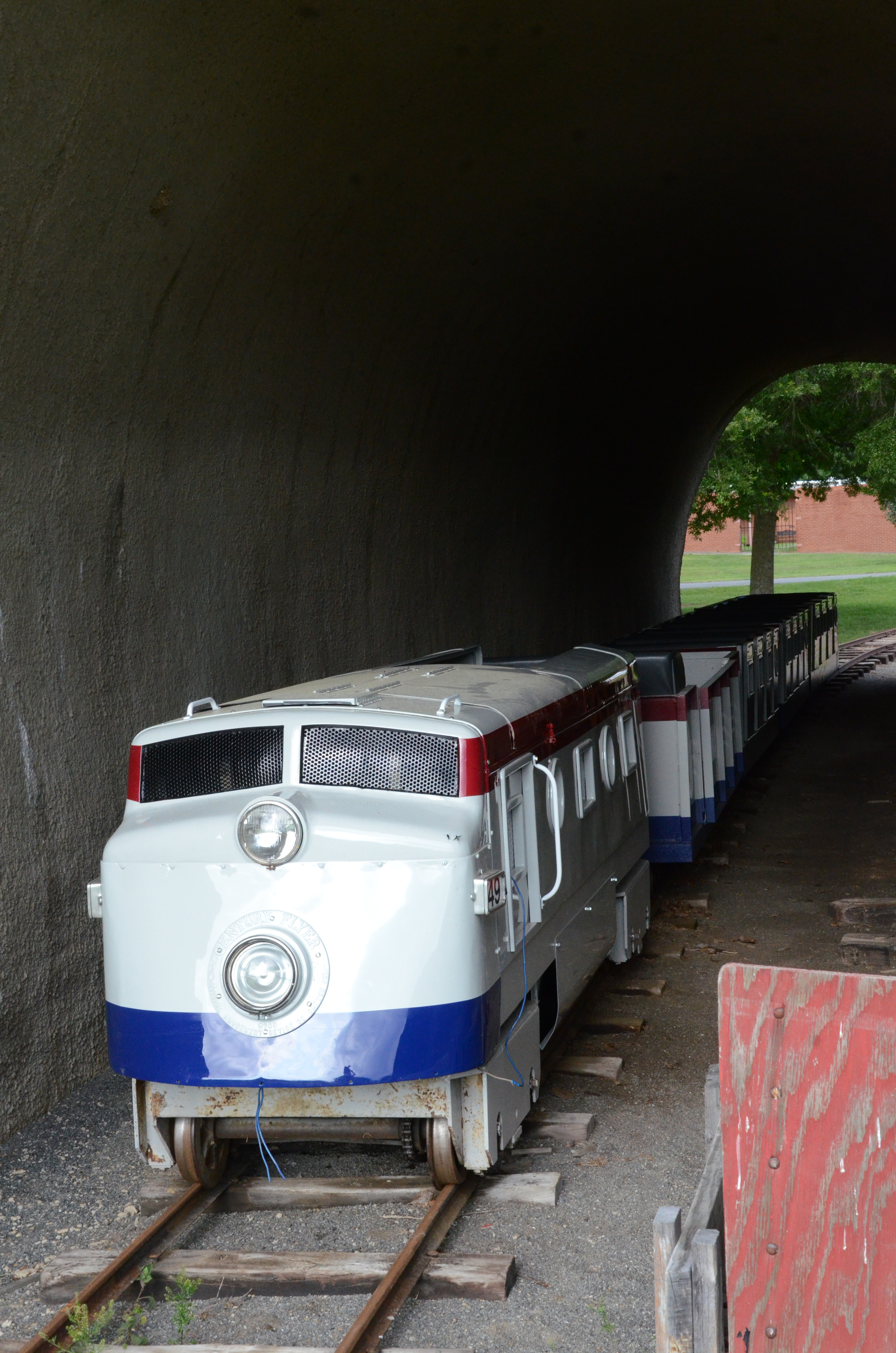

- Location within Arkansas Location within the United States
- Location: 150 East Siebenmorgen Road; Conway, Arkansas
- Coordinates: 35°6′8″N 92°25′45″W
- Built: c. 1955
- Architect: National Amusement Devices
- NRHP reference No.: 10000284
- Added to NRHP: May 28, 2010

The Century Flyer is a 2 ft (610 mm) gauge train originally built as an amusement park ride. It is located on the grounds of the Conway Human Development Center, a residential facility that treats patients with developmental disabilities at 150 East Siebenmorgen Road in Conway, Arkansas.

== History ==
This train was built in the early 1950s by National Amusement Devices, a manufacturer of roller coaster cars. This company built several of the Century Flyer train sets for use at amusement parks around the country. This particular train set was sold to the Burns Park "Funland" in North Little Rock, Arkansas in 1957.

In 1959, the train and tracks were sold to a local professional women's organization, who donated them to the Conway Human Development Center (then known as the Arkansas Children's Colony) for use by the patients. One third of a mile of track was laid and two trestles were built.

Over the years, the train and track fell into disrepair. The Central Arkansas Model Railroad Club volunteered to upgrade and refurbish the train and track.

The Century Flyer was listed in the National Register of Historic Places due to its being one of the few remaining trains built by National Amusement Devices still operating.

== See also ==
- Amusement rides on the National Register of Historic Places
- National Register of Historic Places listings in Faulkner County, Arkansas
