= Mesoscaphe =

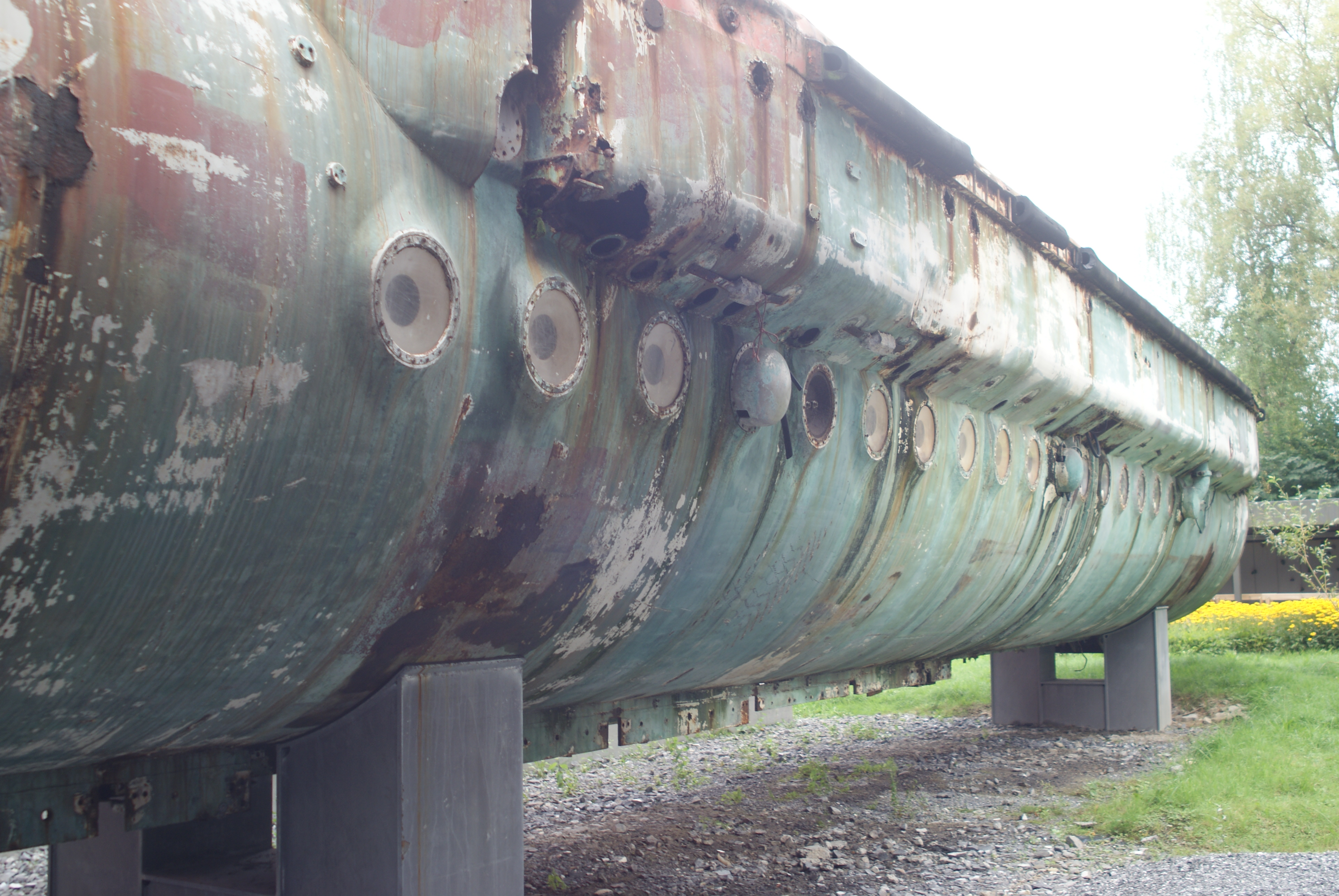
A mesoscaphe in the Swiss Museum of Transport in 2008

Mesoscaphe is a type of submersible submarine invented by Jacques Piccard:

- Auguste Piccard (PX-8), a Swiss research mesoscaph
- Ben Franklin (PX-15), a U.S. Navy research mesoscaph

== See also ==
- Bathyscaphe
- Submarine
