= Hypercoaster =

Height class for roller coasters

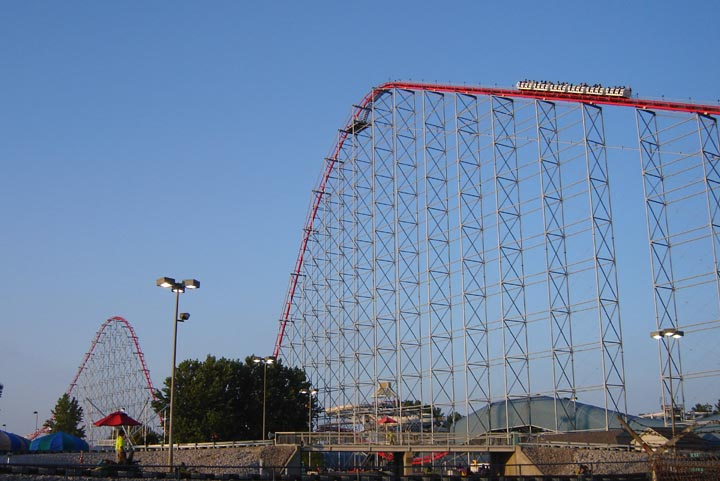
The world's first hypercoaster, Magnum XL-200 at Cedar Point

A hypercoaster is a roller coaster with a height or drop measuring at least 200 feet (61 m). The term was coined by Arrow Dynamics and Cedar Point in 1989 with the opening of the world's first hypercoaster, Magnum XL-200, which features a height of 205 feet (62 meters) and a drop of 194.7 feet (59.3 meters). The next hypercoaster, Steel Phantom at Kennywood, opened two years later in 1991, with a drop of 225 feet (68.5 meters) and a height of 160 feet (48.8 meters).

Other roller coaster manufacturers may or may not recognize the term hypercoaster when naming their models. Intamin calls their hypercoaster model a Mega Coaster, and Bolliger & Mabillard labels theirs a Hyper Coaster. The competition between amusement parks to build increasingly taller roller coasters eventually led to the next height classification for roller coasters known as giga coasters, which have a height or drop measuring at least 300 feet (91 m). This was soon followed by the world's first strata coasters – exceeding 400 feet (120 m) – with the release of Top Thrill Dragster in 2003.

== History ==
The world's first hypercoaster was Magnum XL-200 at Cedar Point, which cost $8 million to construct. Cedar Point hired Arrow Dynamics for the design and construction began in 1988. Since its debut on May 6, 1989, Magnum XL-200 has accommodated over 36 million riders. Cedar Point's official blog states that after building the ride, "...discussion was focused on just what a roller coaster such as Magnum should be called. After all, it had no loops like most of the other large steel coasters of the time and was so much bigger and faster than its non-looping brethren. After a couple of years, the name everyone agreed upon was hypercoaster."

== Description ==
Hypercoasters were originally built for speed and airtime, to counter the trend of constructing bigger and bigger looping coasters. To accomplish this the elements of a hypercoaster often include a large first drop, several additional drops of declining height, a large turn or helix, and then many airtime-inducing hills. Hypercoasters are commonly designed with an out and back layout, although there are occasionally hypercoasters that use a twister layout, such as Raging Bull at Six Flags Great America, and others that combine both, such as Diamondback at Kings Island.

Hypercoasters are highly ranked in the annual Amusement Today Golden Ticket Awards. In 2006, Six Flags New England's Superman: Ride of Steel (later named Bizarro and Superman The Ride) was ranked first place. Others such as Magnum XL-200 (third), Nitro (fourth), and Apollo's Chariot (fifth) followed closely behind in the top five, with hypercoasters making up the majority of the Top 10 Steel Coasters. By 2010, hypercoasters completely filled the top 10, as well as 16 of the top 20.

Hypercoasters were first manufactured by Arrow Dynamics in the late 1980s to early 1990s. Since then, a number of companies, including Bolliger & Mabillard, Intamin, D. H. Morgan Manufacturing, and Giovanola have designed and constructed hypercoasters.

Though hypercoasters are typically steel roller coasters, Son of Beast at Kings Island was the first and only wooden hypercoaster. Due to a number of issues, the ride was eventually demolished in 2012.

In 2018, Cedar Point opened the first hybrid hypercoaster, Steel Vengeance. Steel Vengeance is the first hypercoaster manufactured by Rocky Mountain Construction.

== Bolliger & Mabillard ==
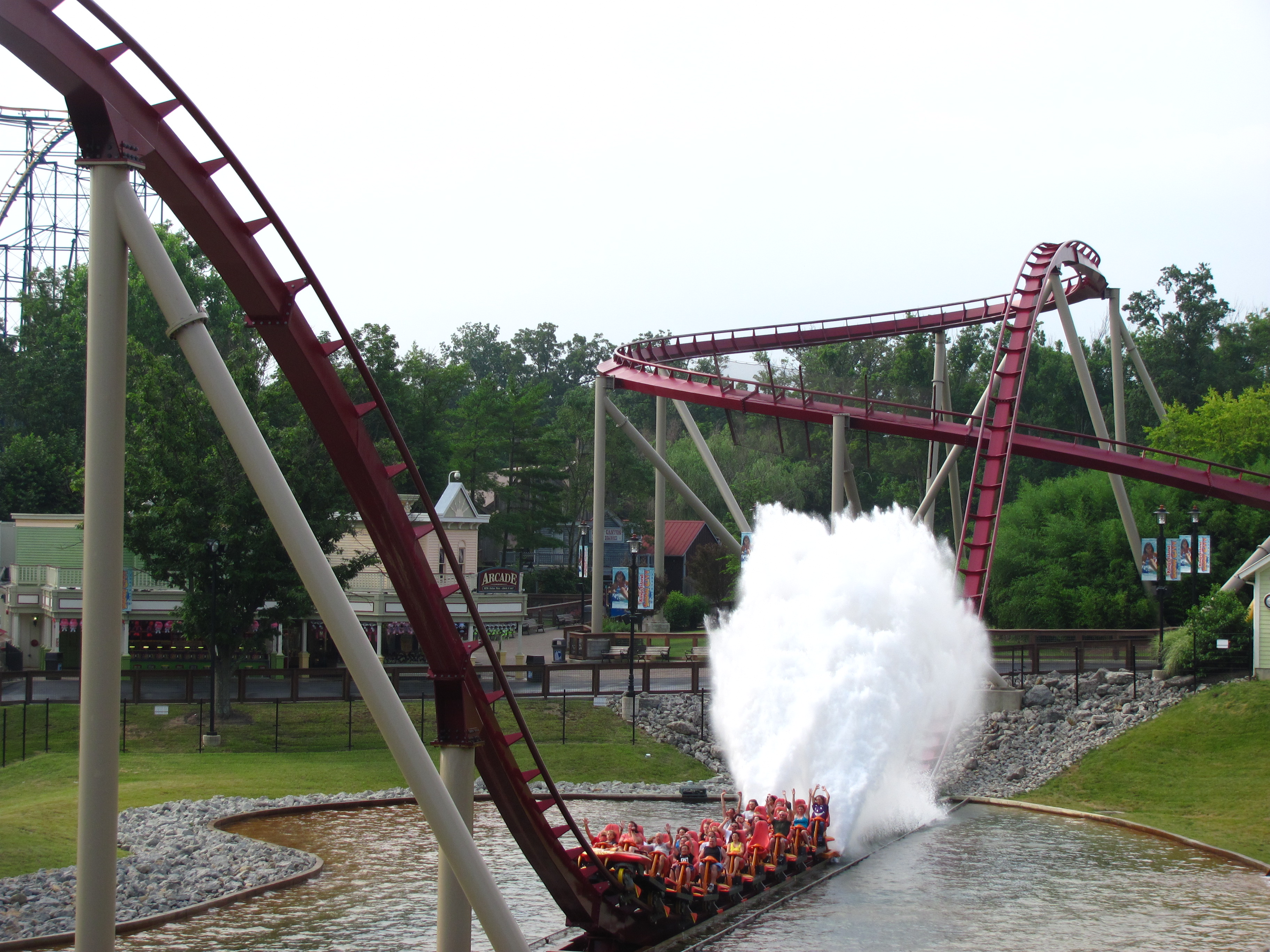
A train passes through Diamondback's splashdown element.

Bolliger & Mabillard (B&M) has produced a number of roller coasters under their Hyper Coaster model line, which represent any installation by the company that exceeds 200 feet in height or drop length, similar to the hypercoaster classification. The first was Apollo's Chariot, which opened at Busch Gardens Williamsburg in 1999. It was one of the two models released that year – in addition to the Floorless Coaster – and was engineered in a way that resembles designs from other manufacturers including TOGO, D. H. Morgan Manufacturing, and Arrow Dynamics. In 2012, B&M produced its first giga coaster, Leviathan at Canada's Wonderland, exceeding 300 feet in height. Bolliger & Mabillard do not use the term giga, but have continued to produce roller coasters in this class.

The typical design of B&M's hyper coaster model includes a large lift hill then a large drop with a steep angle of descent, and typically includes airtime hills. One exception, Raging Bull at Six Flags Great America does not have this standard "out-and-back" layout, but rather features a "twister" layout.

The trains feature seven to nine cars of one row with four seats, resulting in each train seating 28 to 36 riders. Depending on the dispatch time and the number of trains, the coasters typically have a capacity of 1,200 to 1,500 riders per hour. Each seat features a unique clamshell restraint. Some trains used on B&M Hyper Coasters feature staggered seats, where the two outer seats are located farther back than the two center seats, creating a more open experience. Currently, this staggered seating arrangement is only featured on four coasters: Behemoth at Canada's Wonderland, Diamondback at Kings Island, Thunder Striker at Carowinds, and Shambhala at PortAventura Park.

=== Golden Ticket Awards ===
The B&M Hyper Coaster has been the most successful model in the Golden Ticket Awards.

B&M Hyper Coasters in the Top 15 Steel Coasters at the Golden Ticket Awards
Coaster	2009	2010	2011	2012	2013	2014	2015	2016	2017	2018	2019
Nitro	3rd	3rd	3rd	3rd	4th	5th	5th	5th	7th	11th	10th
Apollo's Chariot	5th	4th	7th	4th	5th	7th	6th	6th	11th	6th	8th
Goliath (SFOG)	4th	5th	4th	9th	7th	9th	12th	14th			
Diamondback	7th		11th	10th	14th	4th	11th	9th	8th	10th	14th
Behemoth	12th	13th	15th			15th					
Raging Bull	14th										
Thunder Striker				7th	8th	10th	7th	8th			
Leviathan					15th	6th	8th	7th	6th	8th	9th
Fury 325							4th	1st	1st	1st	1st
Mako											15th

== List of hypercoasters ==
The following is a list of roller coasters with a height of at least 200 feet (61 m). Shuttle roller coasters are typically not classified as hypercoasters and are therefore listed separately.

Manufacturer	Number	Production
Intamin	23 (5 Shuttle)	1999–present
Bolliger & Mabillard	23	1999–present
Arrow Dynamics	5	1989–2001
D. H. Morgan Manufacturing	5	1996–2001
Premier Rides	4 (All Shuttle)	1997–2000
S&S Worldwide	4	2006–2012
Mack Rides	5	2017–present
Rocky Mountain Construction	3	2018–present
Giovanola	2	2000–2001
TOGO	2	1996–1997
Gerstlauer	1	2015
Chance Morgan	1	2004
Lagoon Amusement Park	1	2015
Meisho Amusement Machines	1 (All Shuttle)	1983
Roller Coaster Corporation of America	1	2000
S&S Sansei	1	2019–present
Vekoma	2 (1 Shuttle)	2010-present

=== Complete circuit ===
Name	Park	Country	Manufacturer	Height	Opened	Status	Ref
Magnum XL-200	Cedar Point	United States	Arrow Dynamics	205 ft (62 m)	May 1989	Operating	
The Big One	Blackpool Pleasure Beach	United Kingdom	Arrow Dynamics	213 ft (65 m)	May 1994	Operating	
Desperado	Buffalo Bill's	United States	Arrow Dynamics	209 ft (64 m)	August 1994	Closed	
Wild Thing	Valleyfair	United States	D. H. Morgan Manufacturing	207 ft (63 m)	May 1996	Operating	
Fujiyama	Fuji-Q Highland	Japan	TOGO	259 ft (79 m)	July 1996	Operating	
Big Apple Coaster	New York-New York Hotel & Casino	United States	TOGO	203 ft (62 m) (Note: Drop height is 144 ft (44 m))	January 1997	Operating	
Steel Force	Dorney Park & Wildwater Kingdom	United States	D. H. Morgan Manufacturing	200 ft (61 m) (Note: Drop height is 205 ft (62 m))	May 1997	Operating	
Mamba	Worlds of Fun	United States	D. H. Morgan Manufacturing	205 ft (62 m)	April 1998	Operating	
Apollo's Chariot (Note: This is a hypercoaster that is not taller than 200 ft (61 m), but has a drop of over 200 ft (61 m).)	Busch Gardens Williamsburg	United States	Bolliger & Mabillard	170 ft (52 m) (Note: Drop height is 210 ft (64 m))	March 1999	Operating	
Raging Bull	Six Flags Great America	United States	Bolliger & Mabillard	202 ft (62 m) (Note: Drop height is 208 ft (63 m))	May 1999	Operating	
Ride of Steel	Six Flags Darien Lake	United States	Intamin	208 ft (63 m)	May 1999	Operating	
Goliath	Six Flags Magic Mountain	United States	Giovanola	235 ft (72 m)	February 2000	Operating	
Superman The Ride	Six Flags New England	United States	Intamin	208 ft (63 m)	May 2000	Operating	
Superman – Ride of Steel	Six Flags America	United States	Intamin	197 ft (60 m) (Note: Drop height is 205 ft (62 m))	May 2000	SBNO	
Millennium Force (Note: This is a hypercoaster that is also a giga coaster, a roller coaster that exceeds 300 ft (91 m) in height.)	Cedar Point	United States	Intamin	310 ft (94 m)	May 2000	Operating	
Son of Beast	Kings Island	United States	Roller Coaster Corporation of America	218 ft (66 m)	May 2000	Removed	
Steel Dragon 2000	Nagashima Spa Land	Japan	D. H. Morgan Manufacturing	318.3 ft (97.0 m)	August 2000	Operating	
Nitro	Six Flags Great Adventure	United States	Bolliger & Mabillard	230 ft (70 m)	April 2001	Operating	
Titan	Six Flags Over Texas	United States	Giovanola	245 ft (75 m)	April 2001	Operating	
Phantom's Revenge	Kennywood	United States	D. H. Morgan Manufacturing/Arrow Dynamics	160 ft (49 m) (Note: Drop height is 228 ft (69 m))	May 2001	Operating	
X2	Six Flags Magic Mountain	United States	Arrow Dynamics	175 ft (53 m) (Note: Drop height is 215 ft (66 m))	January 2002	Closed	
Silver Star	Europa-Park	Germany	Bolliger & Mabillard	239.5 ft (73.0 m)	March 2002	Operating	
Xcelerator	Knott's Berry Farm	United States	Intamin	205 ft (62 m)	June 2002	Operating	
Thunder Dolphin	Tokyo Dome City Attractions	Japan	Intamin	262.5 ft (80.0 m)	May 2003	Operating	
Top Thrill 2 (Note: This is a hypercoaster that is also a strata coaster, a roller coaster that exceeds 400 ft (120 m) in height.)	Cedar Point	United States	Intamin	420 ft (130 m)	May 2003	Operating	
Superman el Último Escape	Six Flags México	Mexico	Chance Morgan	219.8 ft (67.0 m)	November 2004	Operating	
SheiKra	Busch Gardens Tampa	United States	Bolliger & Mabillard	200 ft (61 m)	May 2005	Operating	
Kingda Ka	Six Flags Great Adventure	United States	Intamin	456 ft (139 m)	May 2005	Removed	
Stealth	Thorpe Park	United Kingdom	Intamin	205 ft (62 m)	March 2006	Operating	
Goliath	Six Flags Over Georgia	United States	Bolliger & Mabillard	200 ft (61 m)	April 2006	SBNO	
Zaturn	Space World	Japan	Intamin	205 ft (62 m)	April 2006	Removed	
Eejanaika	Fuji-Q Highland	Japan	S&S Worldwide	249 ft (76 m)	July 2006	Operating	
Griffon	Busch Gardens Williamsburg	United States	Bolliger & Mabillard	205 ft (62 m)	May 2007	Operating	
Behemoth	Canada's Wonderland	Canada	Bolliger & Mabillard	230 ft (70 m)	May 2008	Operating	
Diamondback	Kings Island	United States	Bolliger & Mabillard	230 ft (70 m)	April 2009	Operating	
Diving Coaster	Happy Valley Shanghai	China	Bolliger & Mabillard	213.3 ft (65.0 m)	August 2009	Operating	
Thunder Striker	Carowinds	United States	Bolliger & Mabillard	232 ft (71 m)	March 2010	Operating	
Pantherian	Kings Dominion	United States	Intamin	305 ft (93 m)	April 2010	Operating	
Wild Eagle	Dollywood	United States	Bolliger & Mabillard	210 ft (64 m)	March 2012	Operating	
Leviathan	Canada's Wonderland	Canada	Bolliger & Mabillard	306 ft (93 m)	April 2012	Operating	
Dinoconda	China Dinosaurs Park	China	S&S Worldwide	226.4 ft (69.0 m)	April 2012	Operating	
Shambhala	PortAventura Park	Spain	Bolliger & Mabillard	249.3 ft (76.0 m)	May 2012	Operating	
Skyrush	Hersheypark	United States	Intamin	200 ft (61 m)	May 2012	Operating	
Bullet Coaster	Happy Valley Shenzhen	China	S&S Worldwide	196.8 ft (60.0 m) (Note: Drop height is 221.2 ft (67.4 m))	July 2012	SBNO	
OCT Thrust SSC1000	Happy Valley Wuhan	China	S&S Worldwide	196.8 ft (60.0 m) (Note: Drop height is 221.2 ft (67.4 m))	March 2014	SBNO	
Fury 325	Carowinds	United States	Bolliger & Mabillard	325 ft (99 m)	March 2015	Operating	
The Oath of Kärnan	Hansa Park	Germany	Gerstlauer	239.5 ft (73.0 m)	July 2015	Operating	
Cannibal	Lagoon Amusement Park	United States	Lagoon Amusement Park	208 ft (63 m)	July 2015	Operating	
Flash	Lewa Adventure	China	Mack Rides	200.2 ft (61.0 m)	January 2016	Operating	
Flying Aces	Ferrari World Abu Dhabi	United Arab Emirates	Intamin	206.7 ft (63.0 m)	February 2016	Operating	
Valravn	Cedar Point	United States	Bolliger & Mabillard	223 ft (68 m)	May 2016	Operating	
Coaster Through the Clouds	Nanchang Wanda Park	China	Intamin	242.8 ft (74.0 m)	May 2016	Operating	
Mako	SeaWorld Orlando	United States	Bolliger & Mabillard	200 ft (61 m)	June 2016	Operating	
Red Force	Ferrari Land	Spain	Intamin	367 ft (112 m)	April 2017	Operating	
DC Rivals HyperCoaster	Warner Brothers Movie World	Australia	Mack Rides	202.1 ft (61.6 m)	September 2017	Operating	
Steel Vengeance	Cedar Point	United States	Rocky Mountain Construction	205 ft (62 m)	May 2018	Operating	
Draken	Gyeongju World	South Korea	Bolliger & Mabillard	206.7 ft (63.0 m)	May 2018	Operating	
Hyperion	Energylandia	Poland	Intamin	252 ft (77 m) (Note: Drop height is 269 ft (82 m))	July 2018	Operating	
Hyper Coaster	Land Of Legends Park	Turkey	Mack Rides	200.2 ft (61.0 m)	2018	Operating	
Yukon Striker	Canada's Wonderland	Canada	Bolliger & Mabillard	223 ft (68 m) (Note: Drop height is 245 ft (75 m))	May 2019	Operating	
Steel Curtain	Kennywood	United States	S&S Sansei	220 ft (67 m)	July 2019	Operating	
Zadra	Energylandia	Poland	Rocky Mountain Construction	206 ft (63 m)	August 2019	Operating	
Orion (Note: This is a giga coaster that is not taller than 300 ft (91 m), but has a drop of over 300 ft (91 m).)	Kings Island	United States	Bolliger & Mabillard	287 ft (87 m) (Note: Drop height is 300 ft (91 m))	July 2020	Operating	
Candymonium	Hersheypark	United States	Bolliger & Mabillard	210 ft (64 m)	July 2020	Operating	
Iron Gwazi	Busch Gardens Tampa	United States	Rocky Mountain Construction	206 ft (63 m)	March 2022	Operating	
Beyond the Cloud	Suzhou Amusement Land Forest World	China	Mack Rides	203.4 ft (62.0 m)	July 2022	Operating	
Hyperia	Thorpe Park	United Kingdom	Mack Rides	236 ft (72 m)	May 2024	Operating	
Falcons Flight (Note: This is a hypercoaster that is also an exa coaster, a roller coaster that exceeds 600 ft in height)	Six Flags Qiddiya City	Saudi Arabia	Intamin	619 ft (189 m)	2025	Operating	
Iron Rattler	Six Flags Qiddiya City	Saudi Arabia	Vekoma	208 ft (63 m)	2025	Operating	
Spitfire	Six Flags Qiddiya City	Saudi Arabia	Intamin	239 ft (73 m)	2025	Operating	
Tormenta Rampaging Run	Six Flags Over Texas	United States	Bolliger & Mabillard	309 ft (94 m)	2026	Operating	
Rokan	Energylandia	Poland	Bolliger & Mabillard	203 ft (62 m)	2027	Under construction	

=== Shuttle ===
Name	Park	Country	Manufacturer	Height	Opened	Status	Ref
Moonsault Scramble	Fuji-Q Highland	Japan	Meisho Amusement Machines	229.7 ft (70.0 m)	June 1983	Removed	
Tower of Terror II	Dreamworld	Australia	Intamin	377.3 ft (115.0 m)	January 1997	Removed	
Superman: Escape from Krypton	Six Flags Magic Mountain	United States	Intamin	415 ft (126 m)	March 1997	SBNO	
Batman & Robin: The Chiller	Six Flags Great Adventure	United States	Premier Rides	200 ft (61 m)	June 1997	Removed	
Mr. Freeze	Six Flags Over Texas	United States	Premier Rides	218 ft (66 m)	March 1998	Operating	
Mr. Freeze Reverse Blast	Six Flags St. Louis	United States	Premier Rides	218 ft (66 m)	April 1998	Operating	
Speed – The Ride	NASCAR Café	United States	Premier Rides	224 ft (68 m)	April 2000	Removed	
Wicked Twister	Cedar Point	United States	Intamin	215 ft (66 m)	May 2002	Removed	
Big Air	E-DA Theme Park	Taiwan	Vekoma	209.3 ft (63.8 m)	December 2010	Operating	
Turbo Track	Ferrari World Abu Dhabi	United Arab Emirates	Intamin	210 ft (64 m)	March 2017	Operating	
Legendary Twin Dragon / 传奇双龙	Chongqing Sunac Land	China	Intamin	229.6 ft (70.0 m)	February 2021	Operating	

== Gallery ==
=== B&M ===
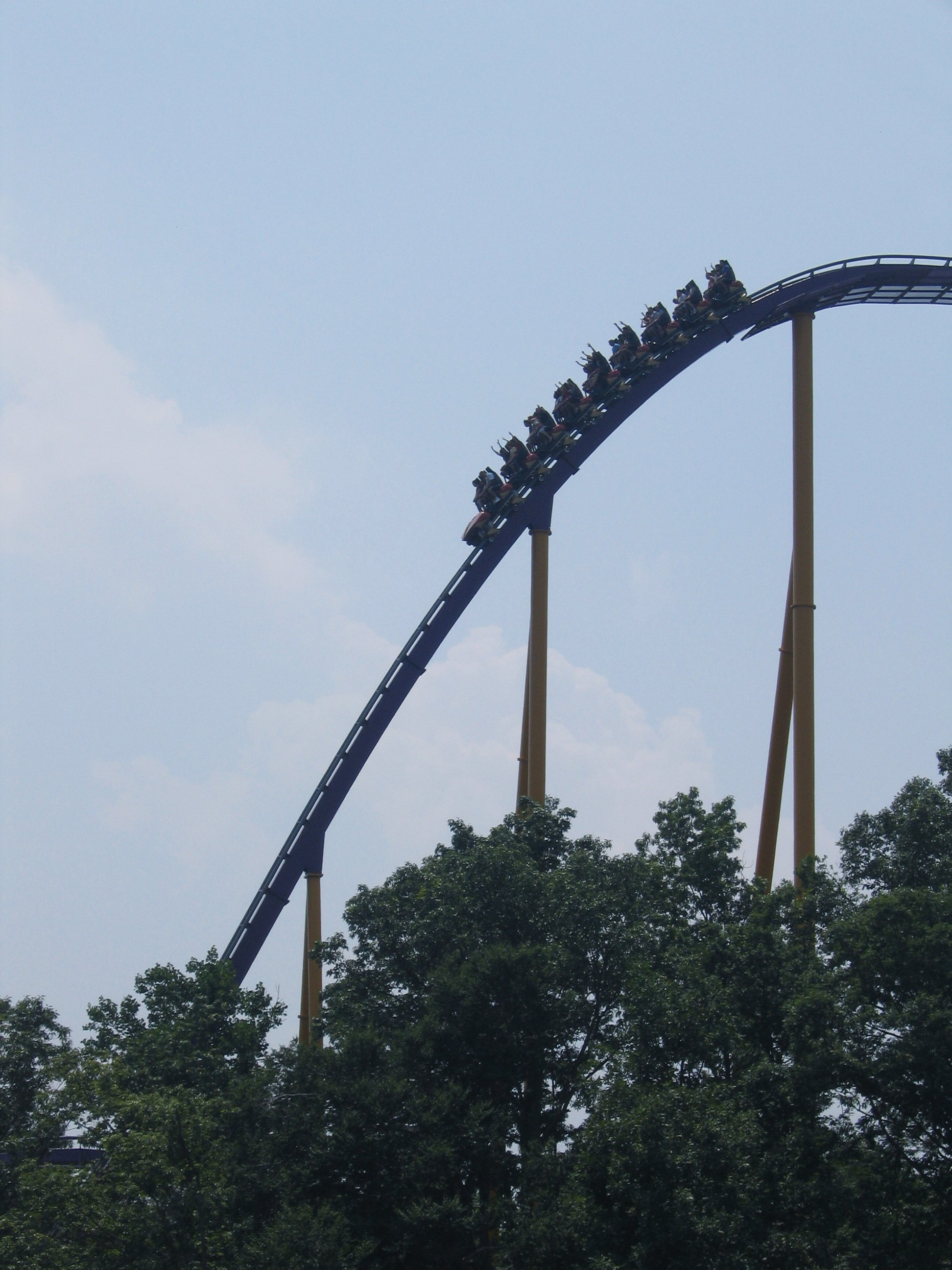
Apollo's Chariot at Busch Gardens Williamsburg, the first B&M Hyper Coaster

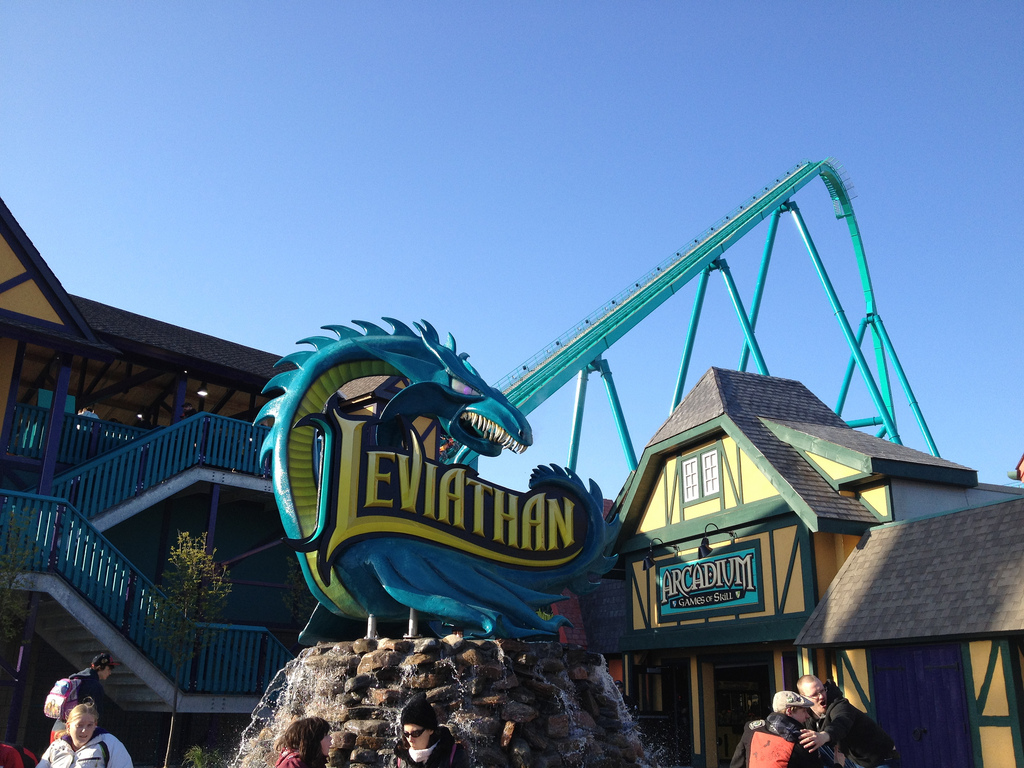
Leviathan at Canada's Wonderland, the first B&M Giga Coaster

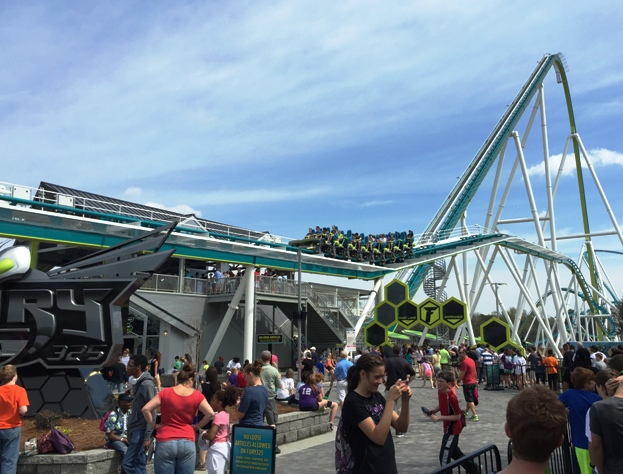
Fury 325 at Carowinds

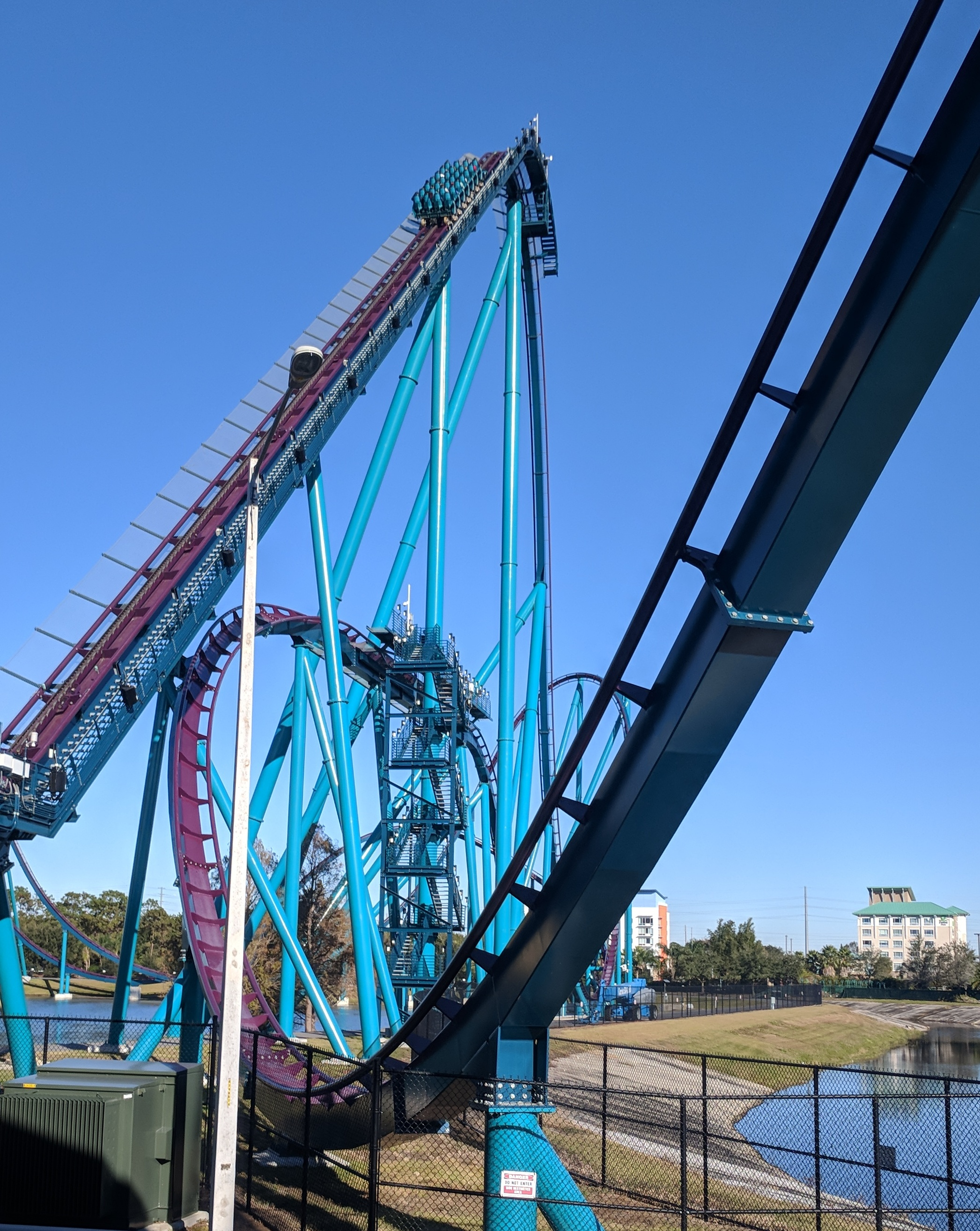
Mako at SeaWorld Orlando

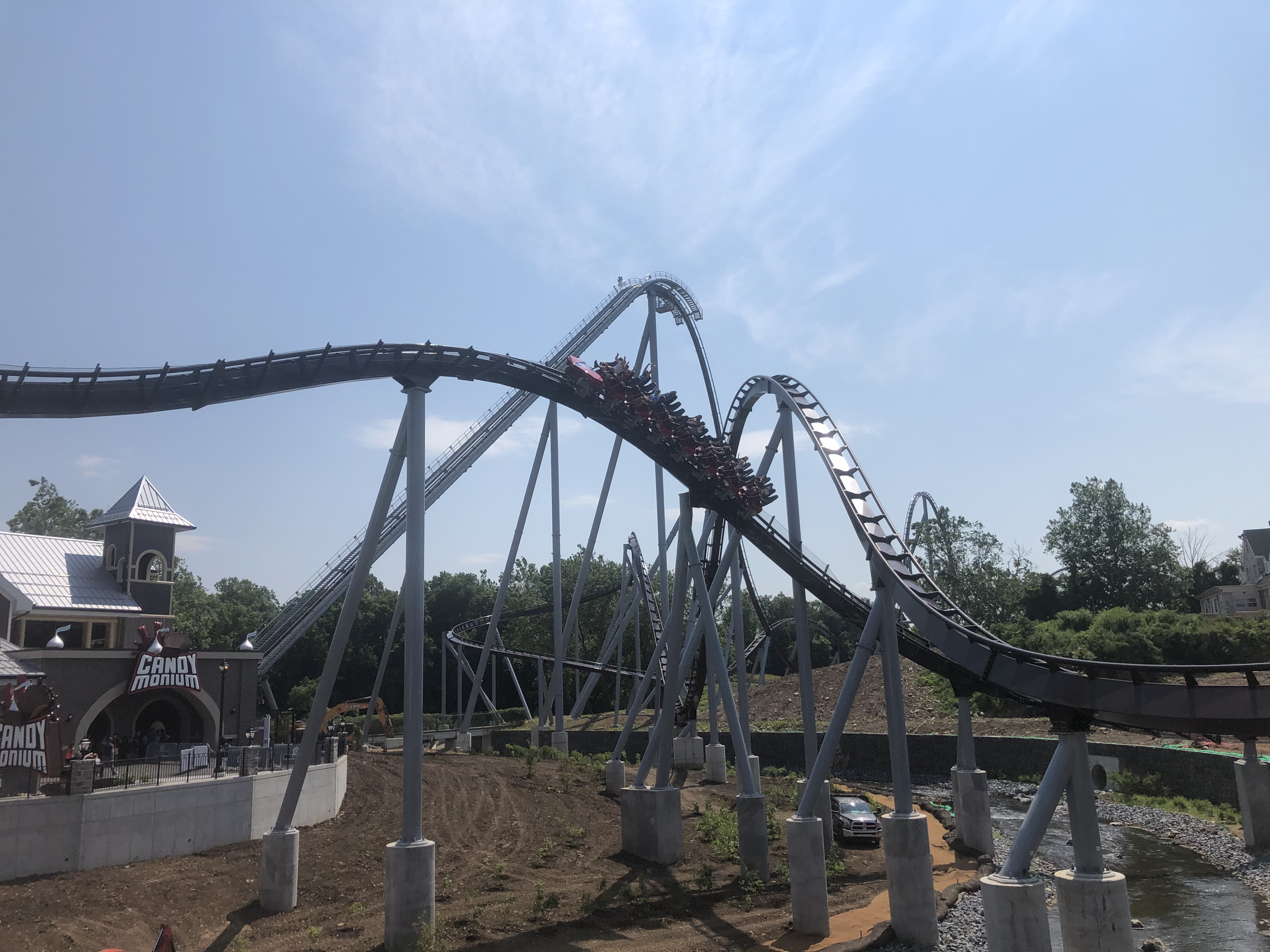
Candymonium at Hersheypark

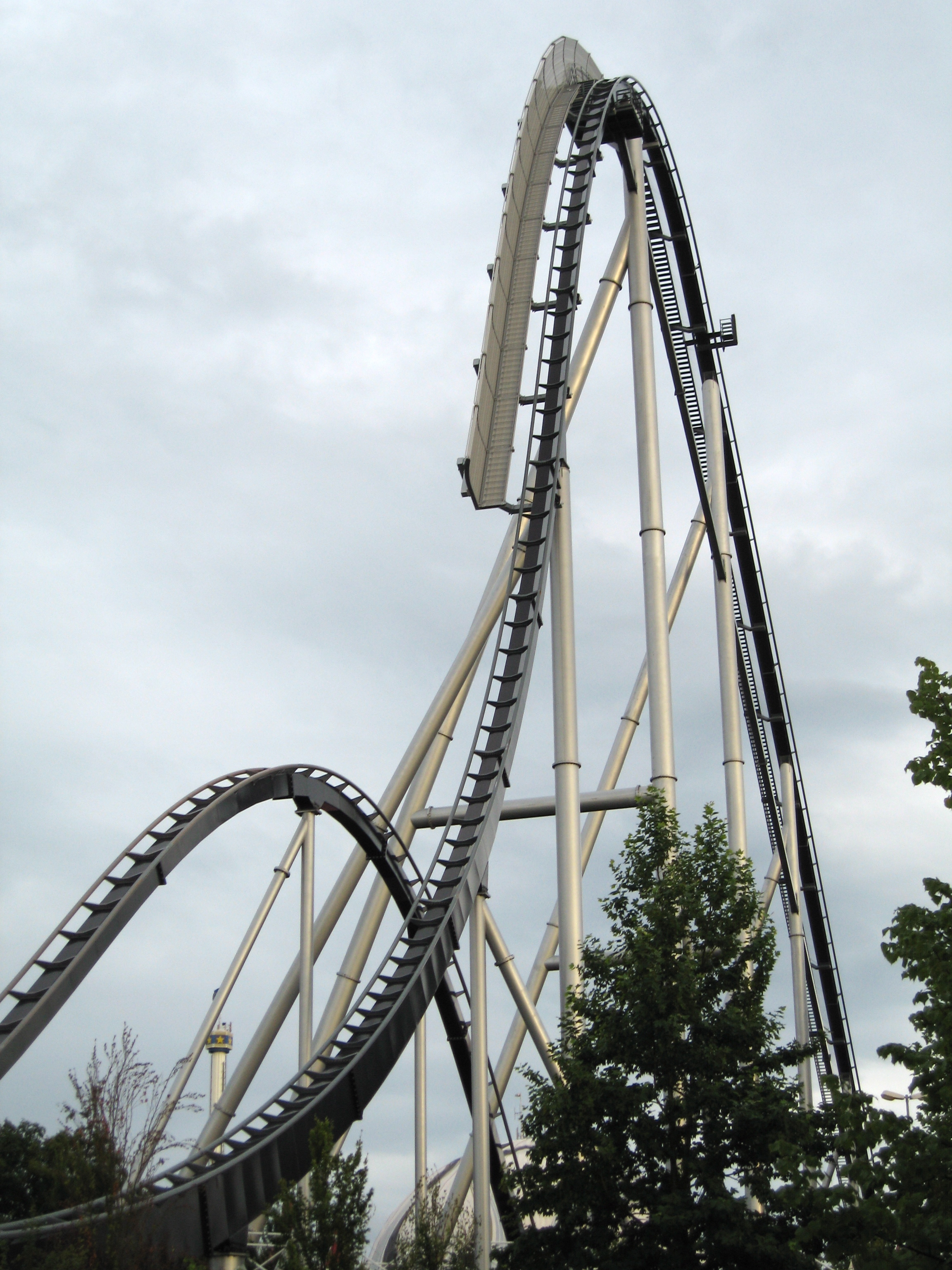
Silver Star at Europa-Park

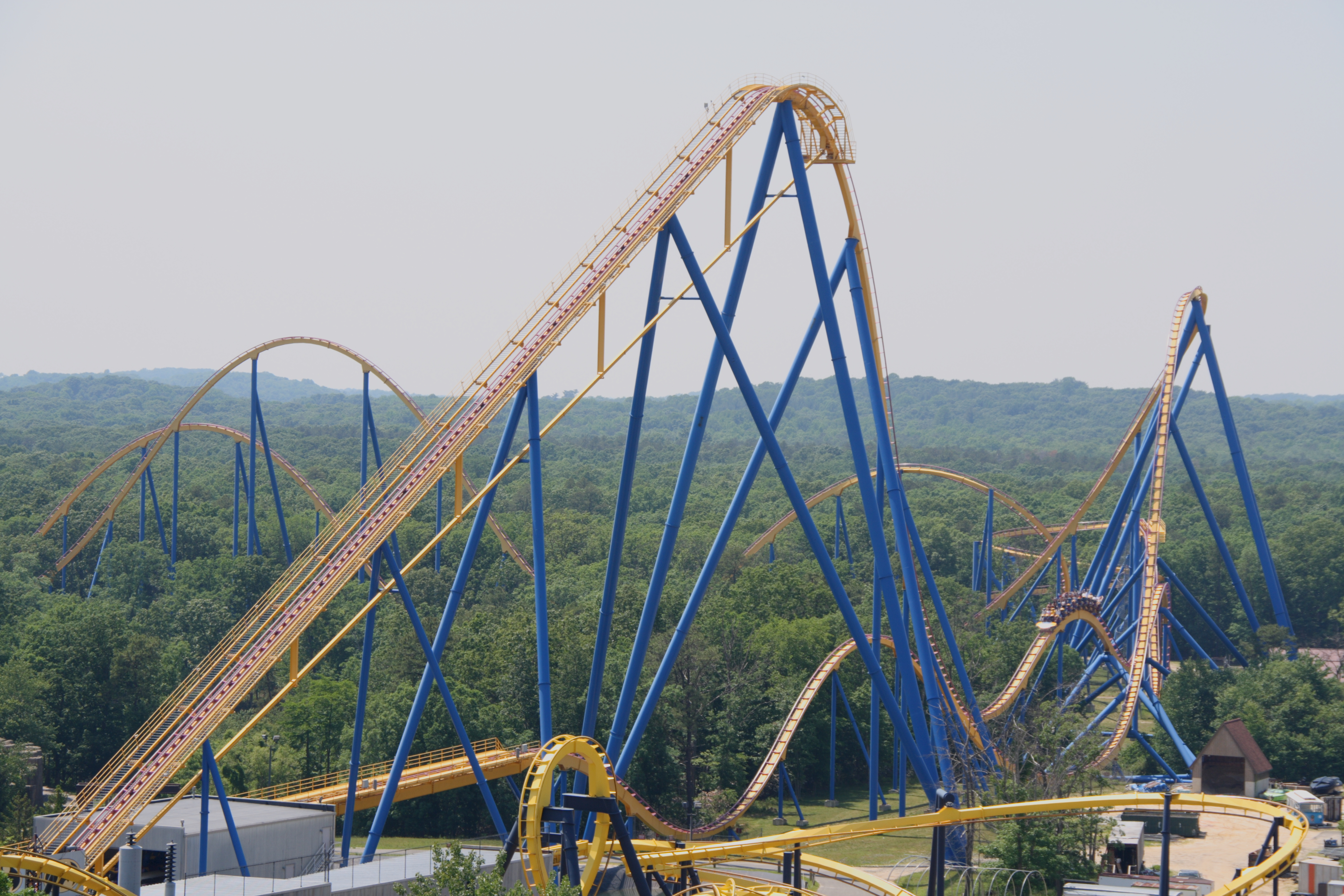
Nitro at Six Flags Great Adventure

=== Other manufacturers ===
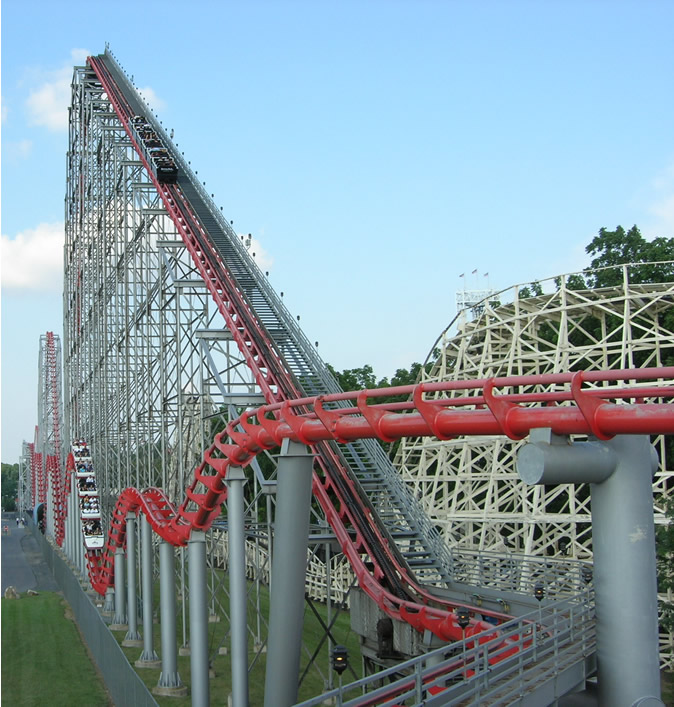
Steel Force (D. H. Morgan) at Dorney Park & Wildwater Kingdom

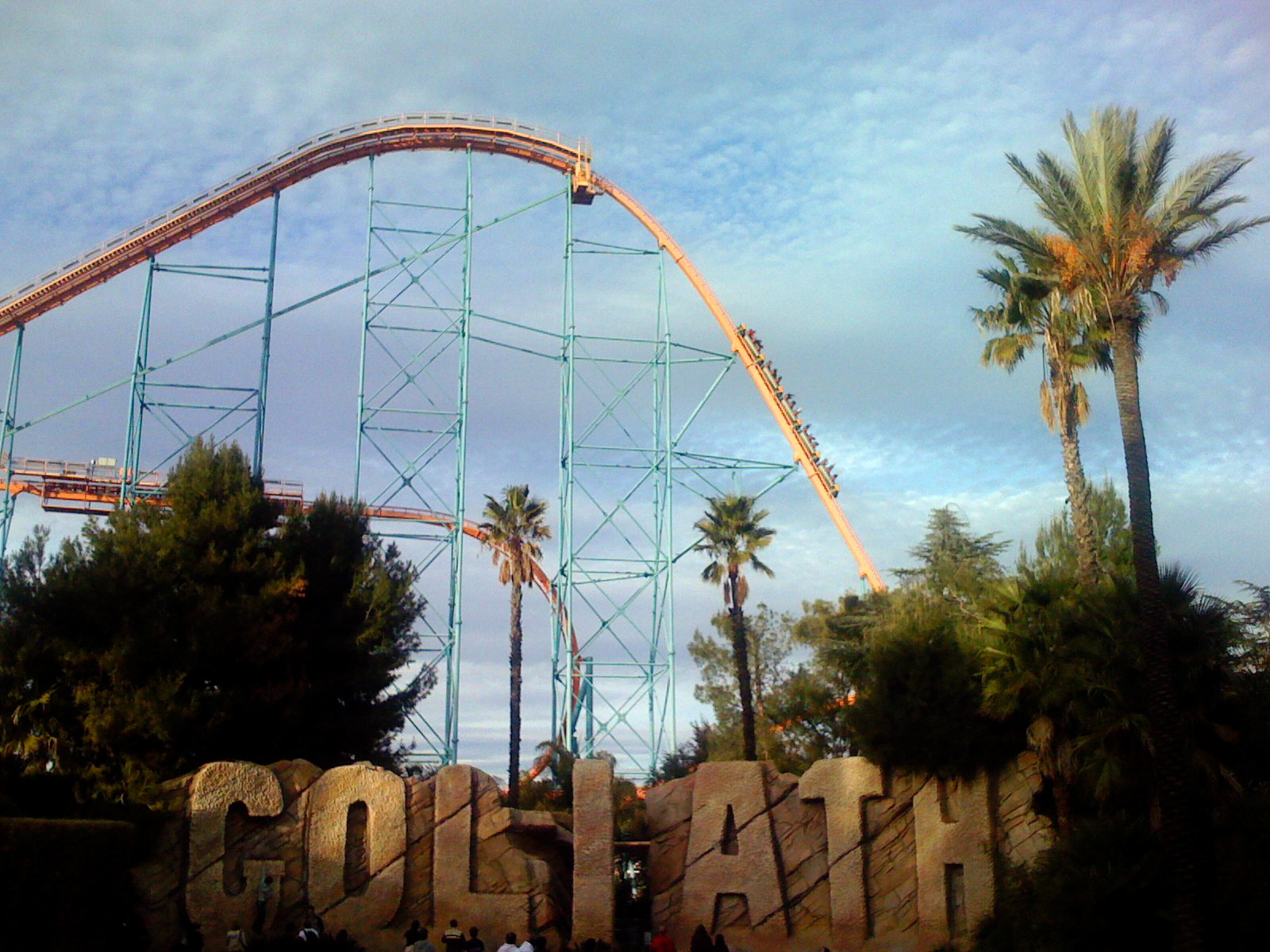
Goliath (Giovanola) at Six Flags Magic Mountain

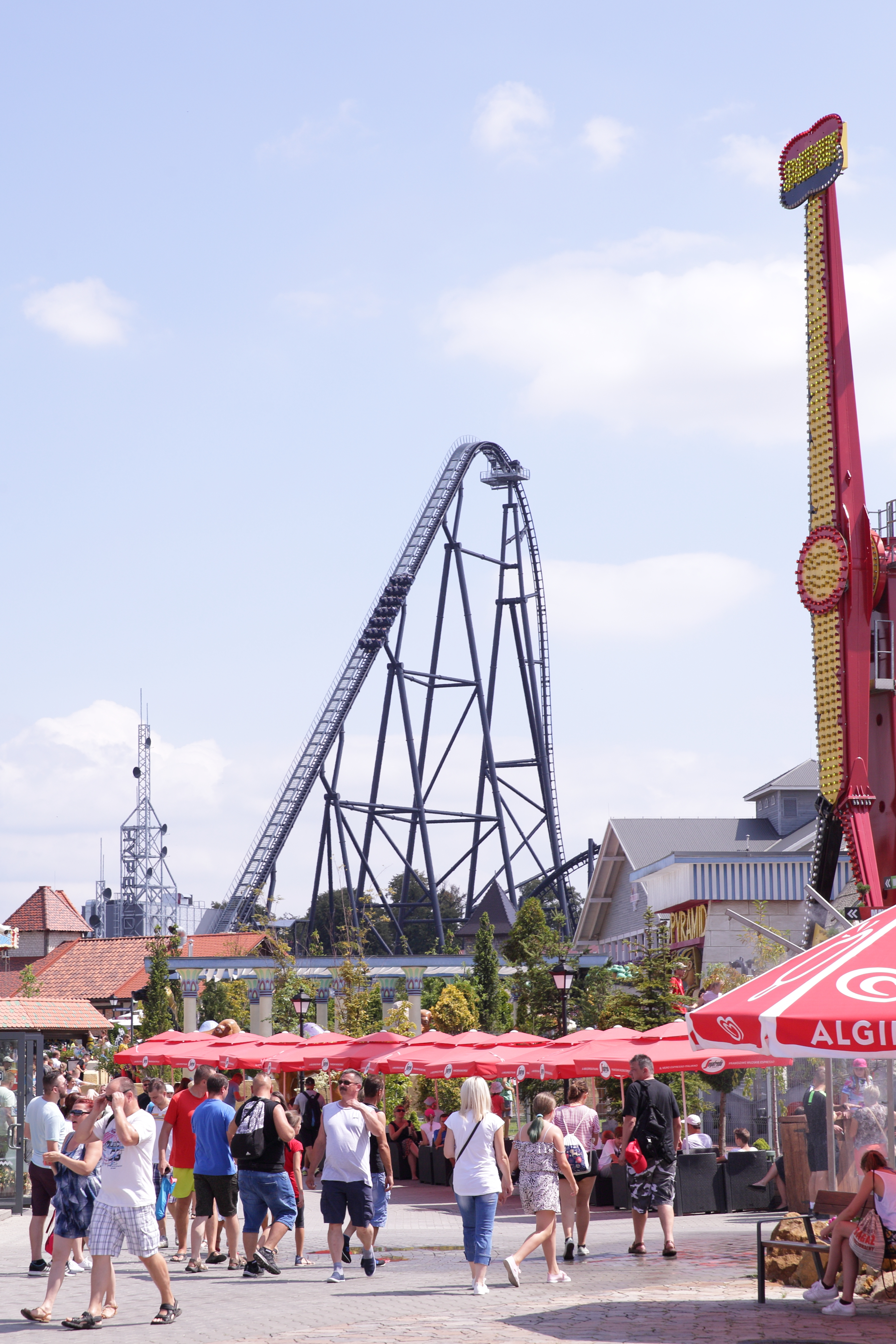
Hyperion (Intamin) at Energylandia

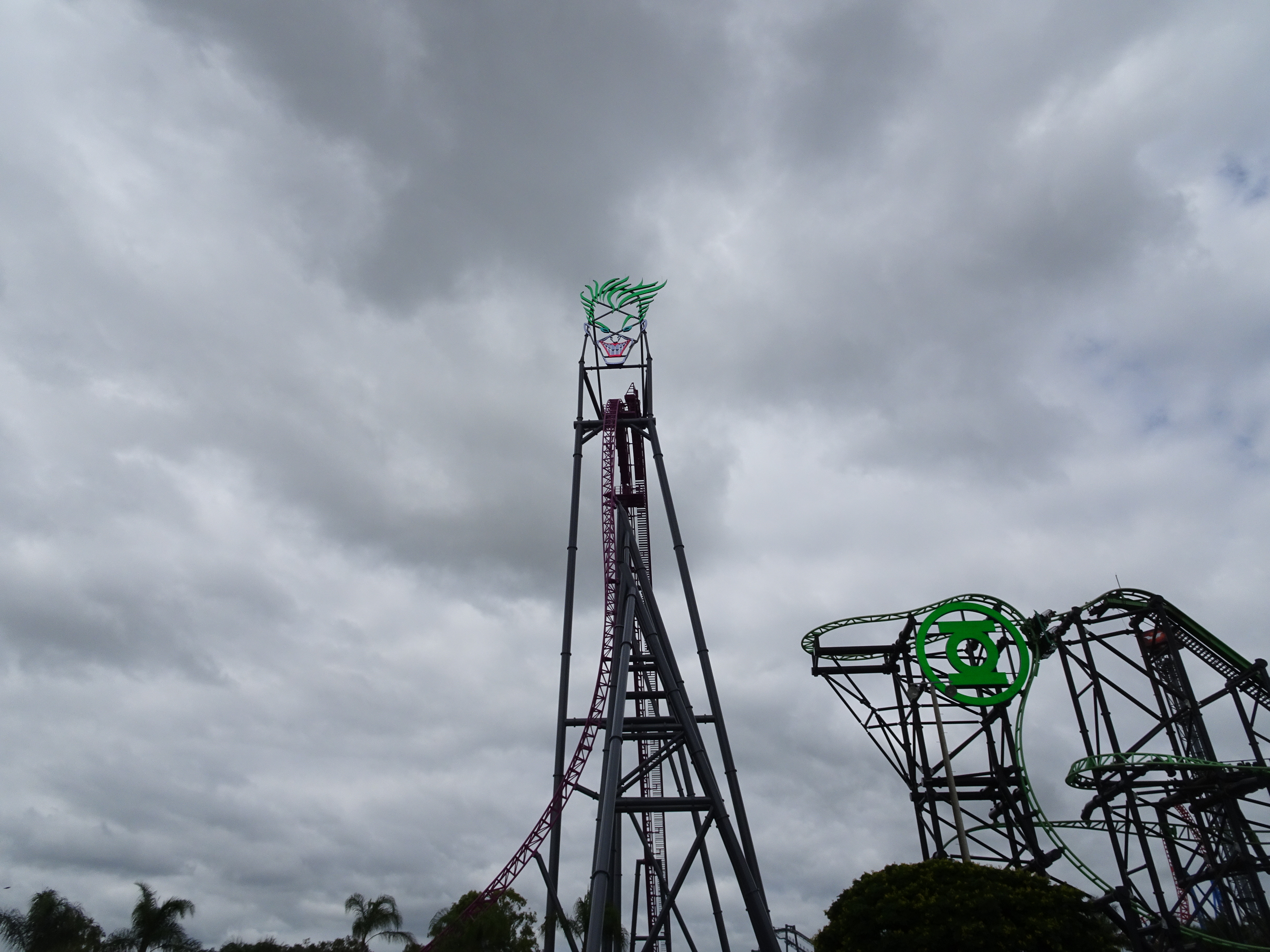
DC Rivals HyperCoaster (Mack Rides) at Warner Bros. Movie World

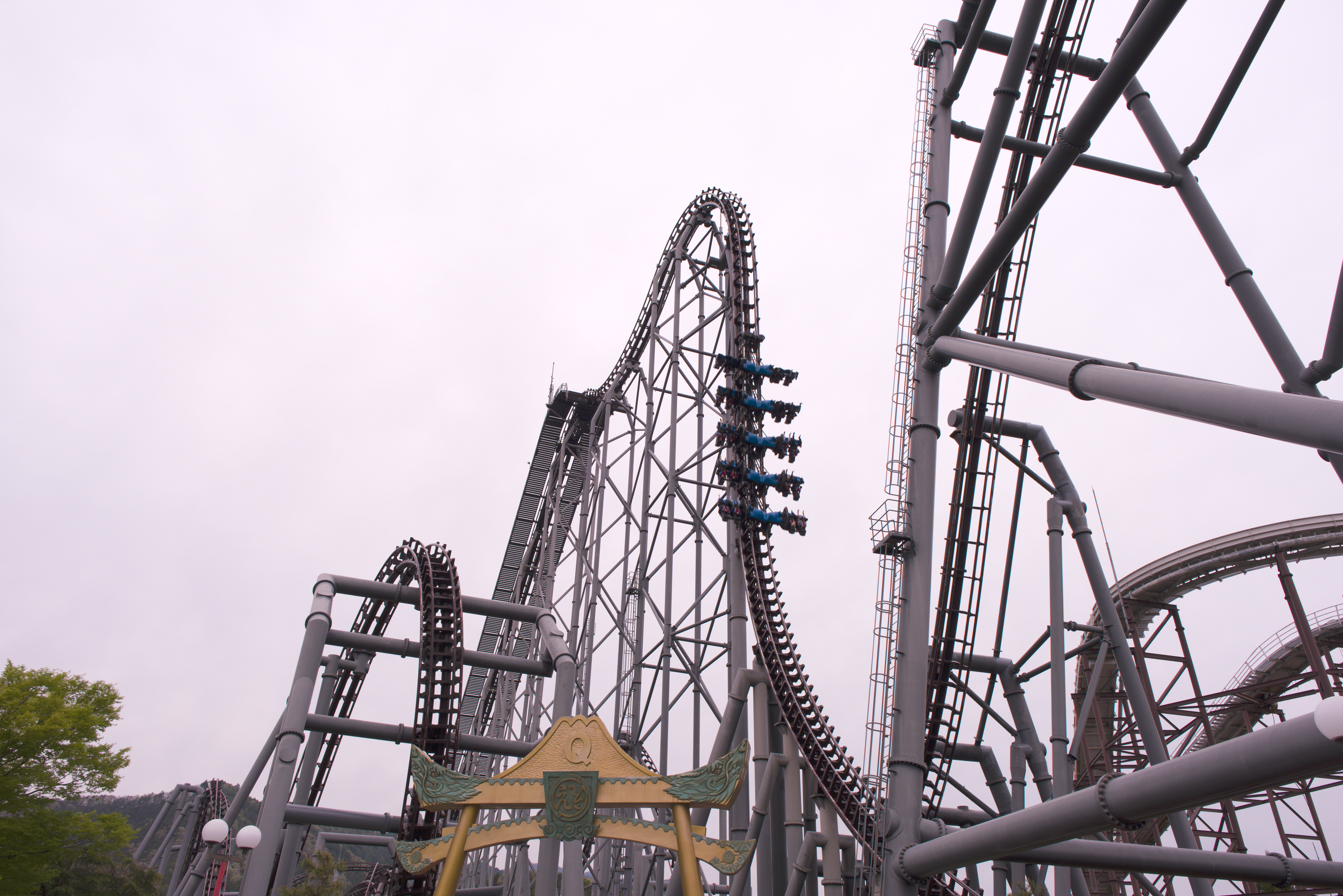
Fourth-dimension hypercoaster Eejanaika (S&S Worldwide) at Fuji-Q Highland

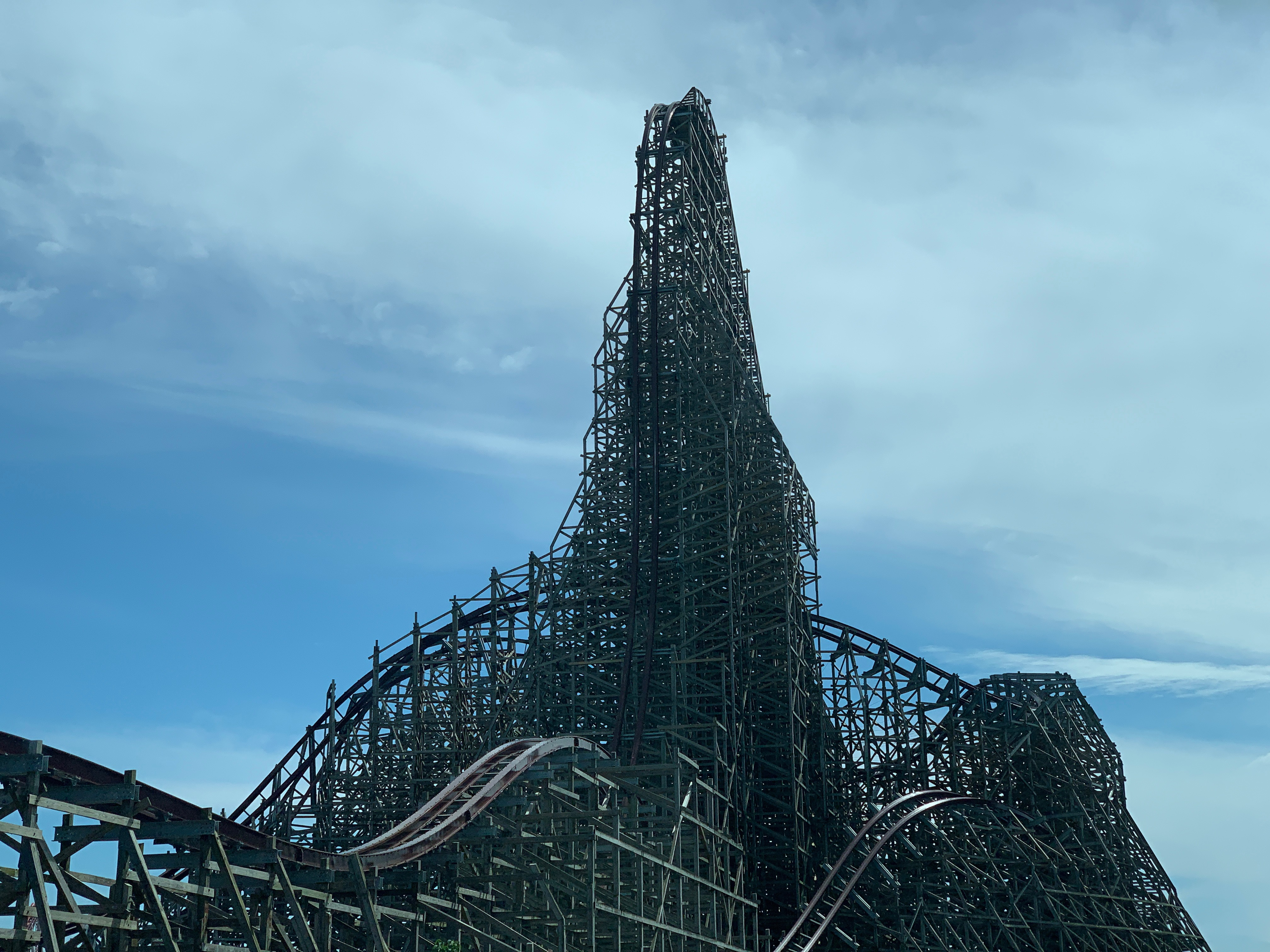
Hybrid hypercoaster Steel Vengeance (Rocky Mountain Construction) at Cedar Point

== Timeline ==
Each row is a coaster, multiple cells in a row show different versions.
