= F.-A. Forel (PX-28) =

Coordinates: 46°29′35″N 06°28′46″E

History

Switzerland
- Name: F.-A. Forel
- Namesake: François-Alphonse Forel
- Builder: Giovanola Frères SA
- Launched: December 1978
- Out of service: 2005
- Status: La Maison de la Rivière

General characteristics
- Type: Submersible
- Displacement: 11 t (11 long tons; 12 short tons)
- Length: 7.54 m (24.7 ft)
- Beam: 2.12 m (7.0 ft)
- Height: 2.30 m (7.5 ft)
- Propulsion: electric motors, batteries
- Speed: 4 km/h (2.5 mph)
- Crew: 3
- Armament: None

The F.-A. Forel was a crewed underwater submersible built in 1978 by Jacques Piccard. Built at the Giovanola fabrication plant in Monthey and launched in Ouchy (Lausanne), it was one of the four submarines that have explored the depths of Lake Geneva, along with the Auguste Piccard and the two Mirs.

It is named after the Swiss Limnologist FA Forel.

The F.-A. Forel achieved a total of 3,600 dives with more than 6,000 passengers between 1979 and 2005. Many of them were done in Lake Geneva, although the submersible visited many other lakes such as Lake Neuchâtel, Lake Constance, Lake Zurich, Lake Lucerne, Lake Maggiore, Lake Bracciano and Lake Lugano. It also visited the Strait of Messina where it reached a depth of 560 metres. Although most of the missions were scientific, the submersible was also used for legal inquiries, industrial observations and tourism.

The ship is currently on display at La Maison de la Rivière in Tolochenaz.

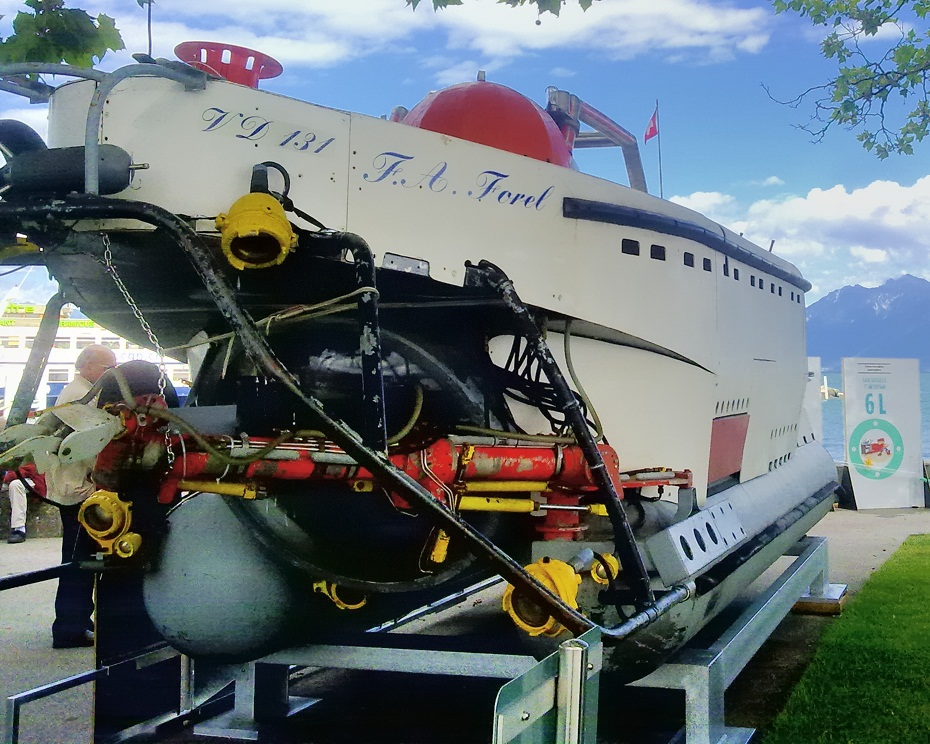
Front

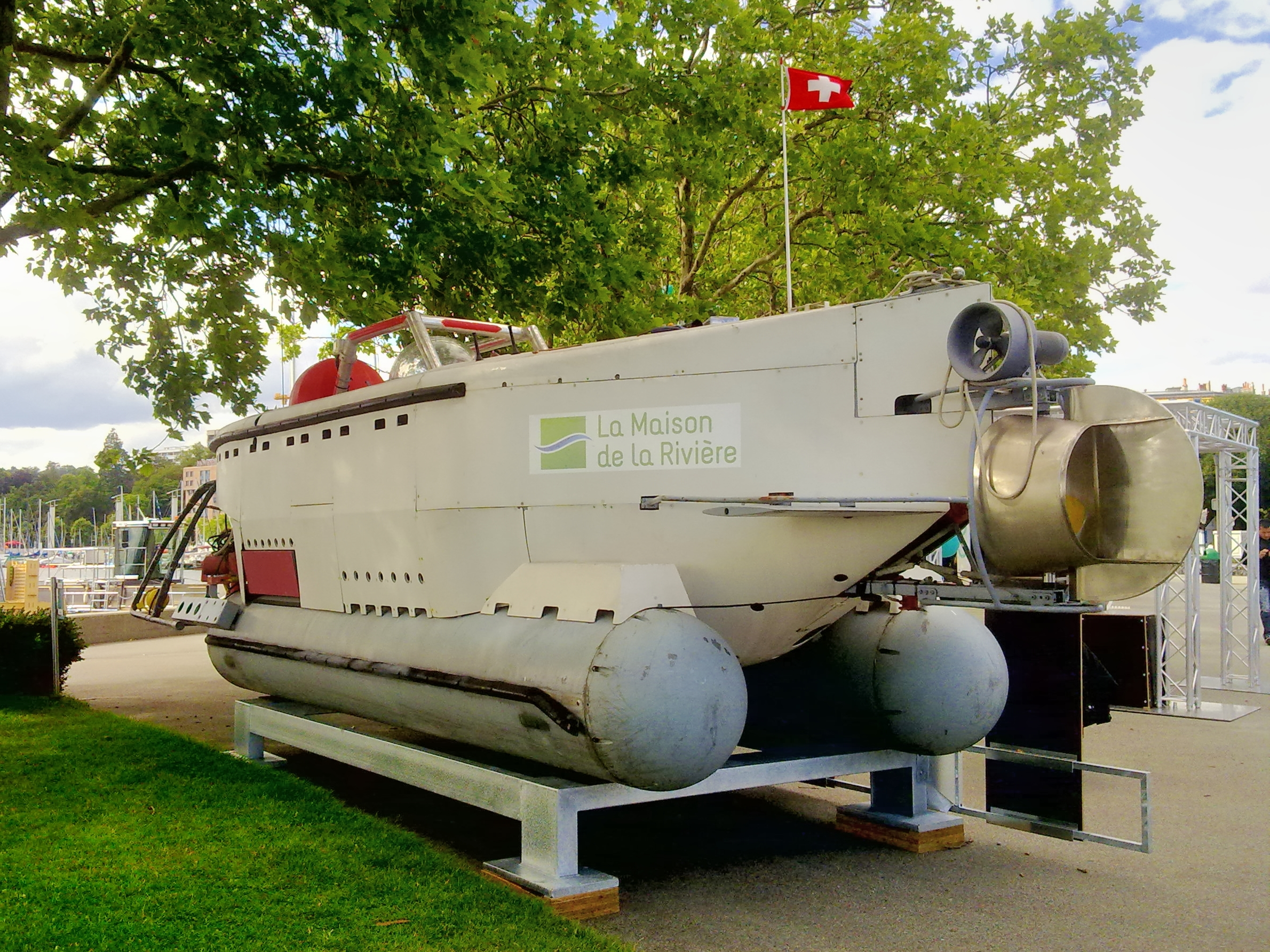
Back
