= Goliath (Six Flags Magic Mountain) =

Steel roller coaster

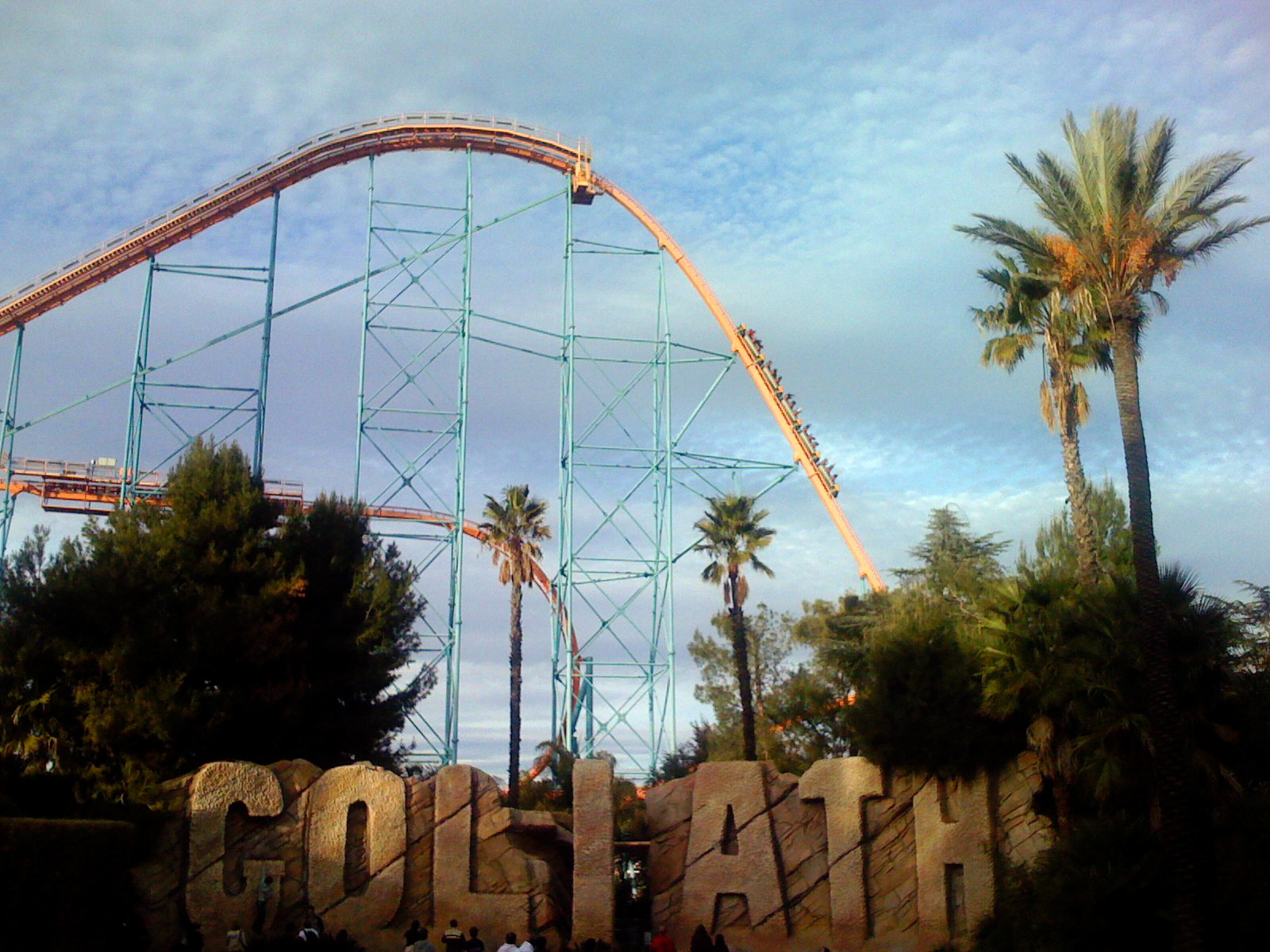
- Goliath's first drop

Six Flags Magic Mountain
- Location: Six Flags Magic Mountain
- Park section: Goliath Plaza
- Coordinates: 34°25′37″N 118°35′49″W
- Status: Operating
- Opening date: February 11, 2000
- Cost: $30 million

General statistics
- Type: Steel
- Manufacturer: Giovanola
- Designer: Werner Stengel
- Model: Mega Coaster
- Lift/launch system: Chain lift hill
- Height: 235 ft (72 m)
- Drop: 255 ft (78 m)
- Length: 4,500 ft (1,400 m)
- Speed: 85 mph (137 km/h)
- Inversions: 0
- Duration: 3:00
- Max vertical angle: 61°
- Capacity: 1600 riders per hour
- Height restriction: 48 in (122 cm)
- Trains: 3 trains with 5 cars; riders arranged 2 across in 3 rows for a total of 30 riders per train
- Website: Official website
- Fast Lane available
- Must transfer from wheelchair
- Goliath at RCDB

Goliath is a steel roller coaster located at Six Flags Magic Mountain amusement park in Valencia, California. Manufactured by Giovanola of Switzerland, the hypercoaster is located in the Goliath Plaza section of the park and opened to the public on February 11, 2000. Its sub-tropical theme is characterized by ancient ruins of the Maya civilization. The ride is nearly identical to Titan at Six Flags Over Texas, but it lacks a 540-degree upward helix prior to the mid-course brake run and features a slightly shorter track layout.

For a brief period, Goliath was widely recognized for having the longest drop at 255 feet (78 m) and the fastest speed of 85 mph (137 km/h) among all closed-circuit roller coasters in the world. Millennium Force at Cedar Point eclipsed both records several months later when it debuted on May 13, 2000, with a drop of 300 feet (91 m) and a maximum speed of 93 mph (150 km/h). Still, Goliath remains among the tallest roller coasters in the world.

== History ==
On January 29, 1999, Giovanola roller coaster track arrived at Six Flags Magic Mountain. It was then confirmed that the new attraction would be a hypercoaster.

On November 11, 1999, Six Flags Magic Mountain announced that the new coaster would be named Goliath. The ride officially opened on February 11, 2000.

In November 2013, seat belts were added to Goliath and Full Throttle.

During the 2015 season, Goliath was covered in advertisements to promote Monster Hunter 4, a Nintendo 3DS game. A Gore Magala monster statue was displayed near the entrance. The queue line featured a supply hunt, large signs talking about the game, a camping site and other props. Plus, the train was wrapped to look like the Gore Magala. A good luck sign was placed in the station and a larger sign was displayed near the exit.

== Ride experience ==
Leaving the station, the train makes a nearly 180 degree right turn. The train then ascends the chain lift hill, reaching a height of 235 ft (72 m). Ascent slows toward the top of the chain lift hill, a safety feature that reduces stress on the chain; it is also an attempt to reduce positive g-forces and increases rider anticipation. The train begins accelerating down its first 255 ft (78 m) drop at a 61-degree angle, into an underground tunnel, reaching a top speed of 85 miles per hour (137 km/h). Upon exiting the tunnel, the train heads upwards into a banked right turn that towers above Twisted Colossus. After completing the turn, the train heads down another drop, flattening out to pass by the onride camera. An airtime hill and banked left turn (rather than a helix on "Titan") follows into the mid-course brake run. The train is decelerated quickly and makes a hard left turn out of the brake section. Another 180 degree banked turn directs the train into a 585 degree, descending helix. Then, the track turns upwards and banks left. After an ascending right turn, the train reaches the final brake run.

== Photos ==
Video of the Ride

A view from the coaster entering its first drop.

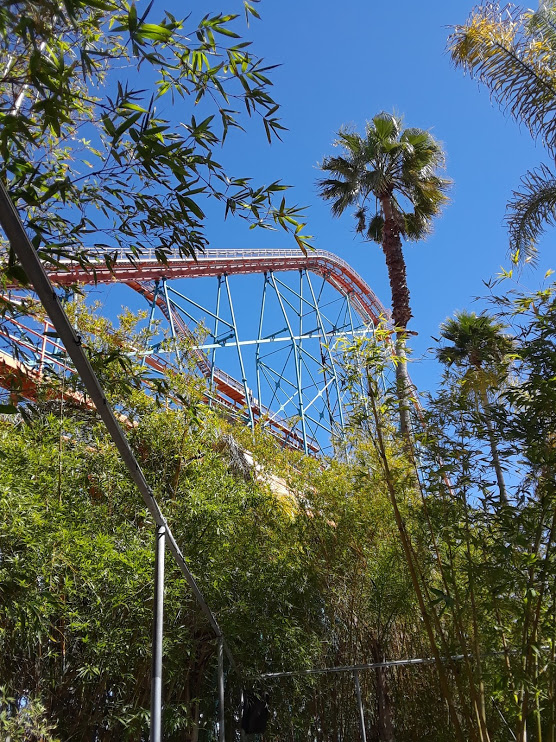

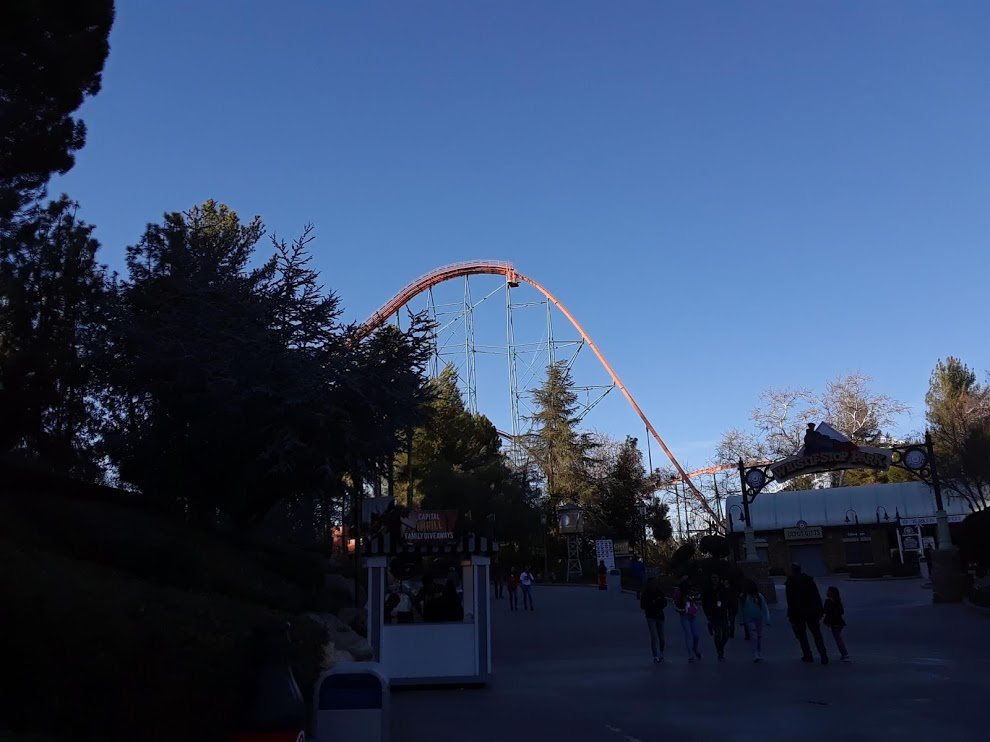
Goliath from the Looney Tunes Land section.

== Operation ==
- 120-foot (37 m) long tunnel at the bottom of the first drop.
- Ride capacity: 1,600 passengers per hour.
- Three five-car 30-passenger trains, with two abreast seating.
- A small error was made while the ride's parts were being manufactured by Giovanola. The very last track piece before the final brake run was about 6 inches (150 mm) too short. The mistake was found while the final piece was being bolted to the ride, and a supplementary track piece had to be made to fill the 6-inch (150 mm) gap.

== Use in media ==
- Appeared as “The Scream Monster” in Judy Moody and the Not Bummer Summer
- Appeared as “Aquaman: The Ride” in Entourage (Season 3 Episode 3 "Dominated")
- Appeared in the Zoey 101 episode "Roller Coaster"
- Appeared in James Corden's Carpool Karaoke video with Selena Gomez
- Appeared in The Anna Nicole Show (2002)
- Appeared in The King of Queens episode "Emotional Rollercoaster"
- Referenced in the song “Colossus” by rapper Tyler, the Creator

== Awards ==
Golden Ticket Awards: Top steel Roller Coasters
| Year | | | | | | | | | 1998 | 1999 |
|---|---|---|---|---|---|---|---|---|---|---|
| Ranking | | | | | | | | | – | – |
| Year | 2000 | 2001 | 2002 | 2003 | 2004 | 2005 | 2006 | 2007 | 2008 | 2009 |
| Ranking | 18 | 14 | 14 | 18 | 18 | 20 | 24 | – | 30 | 33 |
| Year | 2010 | 2011 | 2012 | 2013 | 2014 | 2015 | 2016 | 2017 | 2018 | 2019 |
| Ranking | 29 | 40 (tie) | 41 | 41 | – | – | – | – | – | 49 (tie) |
| Year | 2020 | 2021 | 2022 | 2023 | 2024 | 2025 | 2026 | | | |
| Ranking | N/A | – | – | – | – | – | – | | | |

== Incidents ==
On June 2, 2001, a 28-year-old woman died from what was thought to be a heart attack while riding Goliath, later determined to be a brain aneurysm. The park closed the ride for several hours and reopened it the same day after it passed inspection.

| Preceded by Fujiyama | World's fastest complete circuit roller coaster February 2000 – May 2000 | Succeeded by Millennium Force |
