= Expo 64 =

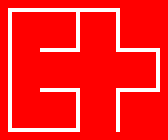
Logo

The Swiss national exposition of 1964 (French: Exposition nationale suisse de 1964), usually shortened to Expo 64, was the 5th Swiss National Exhibition held in Lausanne, more specifically in Vidy and the neighbouring Vallée de la Jeunesse, between 30 April and 25 October 1964.

Expo 64 was directed by Gabriel Despland, with Alberto Camenzind as chief architect, Edmond Henri as administrative director, and Paul Ruckstuhl as financial director. The syndic of Lausanne, Georges-André Chevallaz, was also part of the direction committee.

== Sectors ==
Expo 64 was divided into eight sectors:

- La Voie Suisse ("the Swiss way"): main sector of Expo 64, devoted to the history, political system, cultural values and future perspectives of Switzerland
- L'art de vivre ("art of life"): devoted to the resources of the 1960s, such as the environment, the way of life and spiritual aspirations.
- Communications et transports ("Communications and transports"): Communications, transports and their consequences on territorial equipment.
- Industrie et artisanat ("Industry and craft"): innovations from 1945.
- Les échanges ("import and export"): indigenous production was emphasised against importations.
- Terre et la forêt ("Earth and forest"): a variety of trees and several typical farms were put on display, along with activities such as milk or wine production.
- Le port (harbour): the leisure centre of the exposition, with restaurants, coffee shops, shops, dance clubs and various attractions.
- La Suisse vigilante ("Vigilant Switzerland"): promoting the Swiss Army. This sector also premiered Wehrhafte Schweiz (Fortress of Peace), a 20 minute short film about the Swiss Army.

== Attractions ==
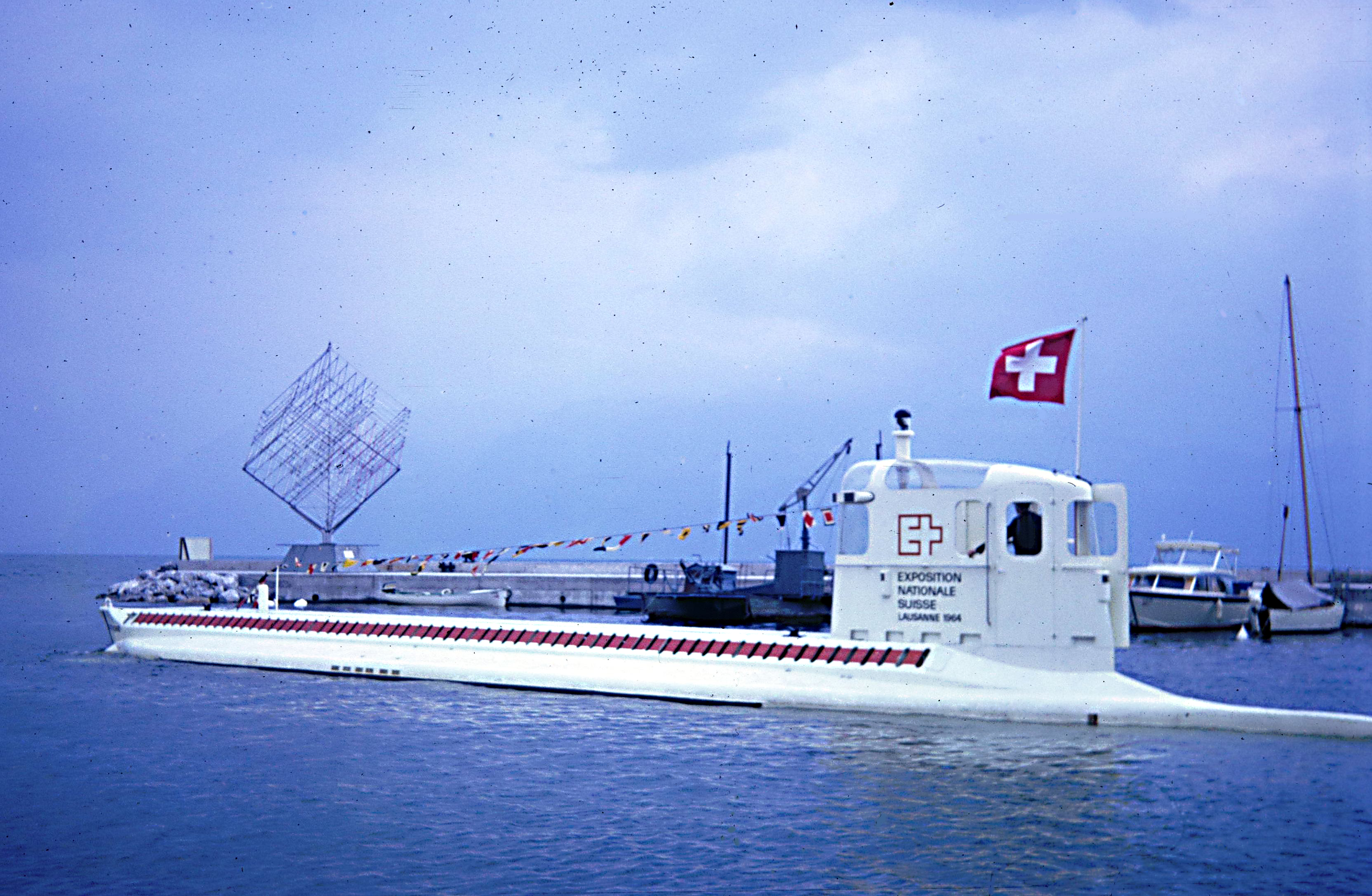
The Mésoscaphe during the exhibition

The main attractions of the exposition were:

- The symphonie des échanges ("Symphony of exchanges"): a symphony played on machines
- A monorail.
- The Mésoscaphe Auguste Piccard (PX-8), and tourism submarine.
- The "Spiral" tower
- Un jour en Suisse ("A day in Switzerland"), a sociological study
- La Suisse s’interroge ("Switzerland ponders"), five 3-minute films by Henry Brandt

The results of the sociological study Un jour en Suisse were subject to censorship, both with the selection of question (questions such as "can one be a good Swiss while being a conscientious objector", "not believe in God", "support the right to abortion" were suppressed) and later when the answers were processed and suggested results that the Federal Council found embarrassing. 580,000 people, out of 12 million visitors, answered the study.

== Remains of Expo 64 ==
Some of the attractions of Expo 64 still exist and can be seen on the lakeside:

- The théâtre Vidy-Lausanne
- The Esplanade des trois Suisse
- A concrete building in the Vallée de la Jeunesse and a playground
- The voile d'or
- A miniature railway in Vidy

Furthermore, the A1 motorway between Lausanne and Geneva, built for Expo 64, is still in operation, along with the Maladière roundabout at the end of the A1. An aerial tramway in Les Diablerets connecting the Scex Rouge, at nearly 3,000 metres, was also inaugurated in occasion of the exhibition.
