= Jacques Rougerie (architect) =

French architect-oceanographer (born 1945)

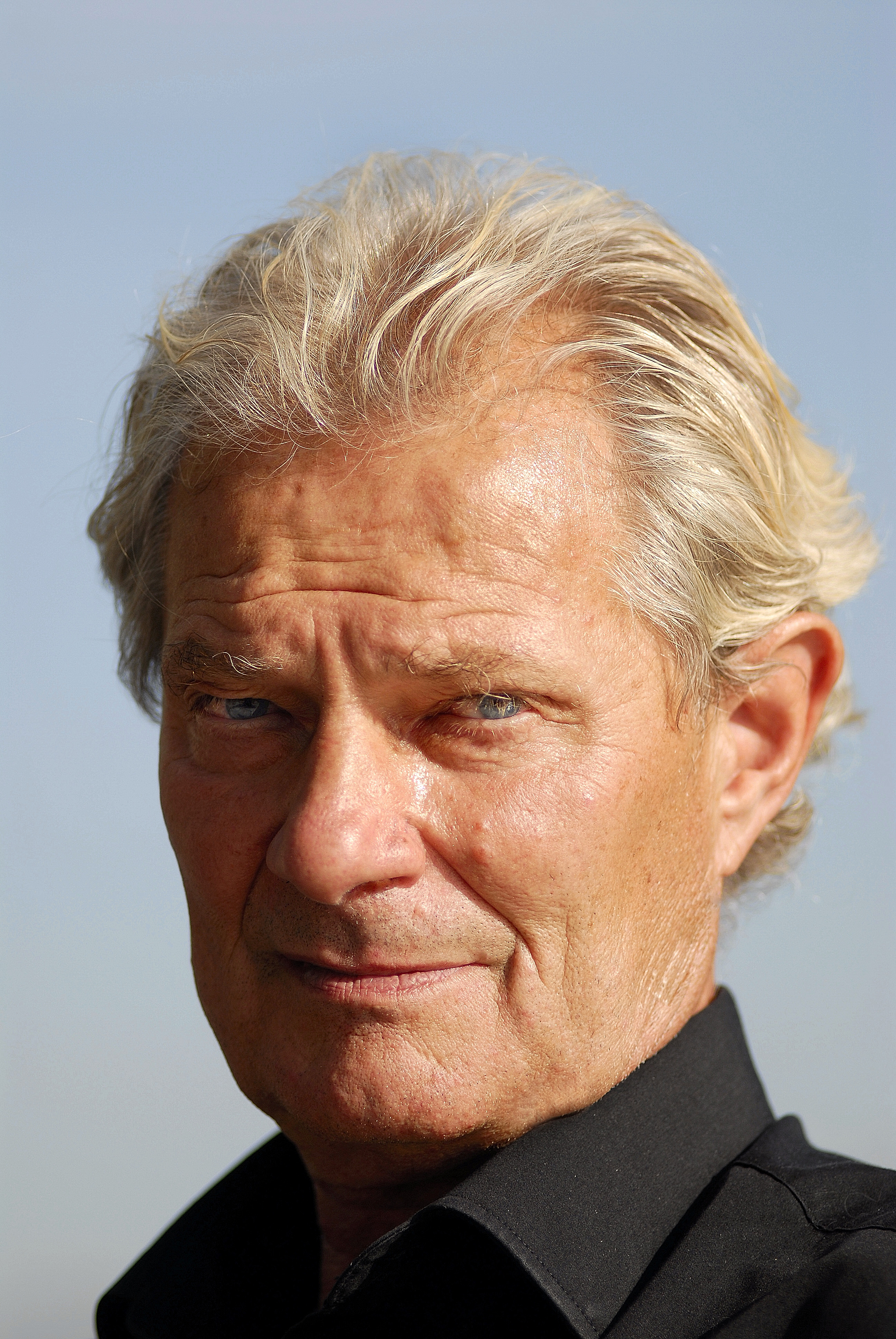
- Born: Jacques Rougerie; 11 July 1945 (age 81)
- Education: École des beaux-arts de Paris; Institut d'océanographie de Paris
- Occupation: Architect
- Practice: Agence Jacques Rougerie Architectes Associés

Jacques Rougerie (born 11 July 1945 in Paris), is a French architect and oceanographer known for his expertise in underwater habitats. MAD Architects has unveiled its design proposal for the Aquatic Centre for the Paris 2024 Olympics. This sports facility is envisioned as an urban public artwork, showcasing Paris's beauty and aspirations. The proposal is a collaboration between MAD Architects and three French architectural studios: Jacques Rougerie Architecture, Atelier Phileas Architecture, and Apma Architecture.

== Biography ==
Born in 1945 to a mathematician mother and a biogeographer father, companion of Theodore Monod, Rougerie lived in Ivory Coast until he turned 11. After moving to France when he was 19, he entered The École Nationale Supérieure des Beaux-arts in 1964, attending the Auguste Perret workshop directed by Andre Remondet and Paul Maymont. Inspired by Jacques-Yves Cousteau and first underwater habitats, he took classes in Institut Océanographique de Paris in 1970, while studying at French Institute of Urbanism and Ecole des Arts et Métiers under the lead of Jean Prouvé. In 1972 he got a master's degree in architecture.

Rougerie bases his research on bionic architecture, in accordance with principles of sustainable development, aiming at emphasizing the role of the sea in the history of humanity. Rougerie builds underwater habitats and laboratories, aquatic centers, transparent shell vessels, subaquatic museums and conceives underwater living areas.

In 2008, Rougerie was elected at the Institut de France - Académie des Beaux-Arts and in 2009, he was awarded the Légion d'Honneur. His flagship project SeaOrbiter, is a futuristic seabed exploration vessel. Rougerie is also involved in floating hotels and universities projects.

== Main creations ==
=== Museums and aquatic centers ===
- 1981 : Sea Pavilion (Kobe, Japan),
- 1989 : Océanopolis I (Brest),
- 1991 : Nausicaá I (Boulogne-sur-Mer),
- 2000 : Océanopolis II (Brest),
- 2001 : Nausicaá II (Boulogne-sur-Mer),
- 2014 : Caribbean Sea Centre (Guadeloupe),
- 2014 : Kochi Oceanarium (India),
- 2015 : Alexandria underwater archaeological museum (Egypt).

=== Underwater habitats ===
- 1973-75 : « Village sous la mer », Virgin Islands (USA), conceived to work and live under the sea,
- 1977: « Galathée », his first underwater habitat,
- 1978-98: « Aquabulles », underwater shelter,
- 1981: « Hippocampe », subaquatic habitat,
- 1989: « Aqualab », underwater habitat-laboratory, based on the concept of transparent shells vessels,
- 1981: « Aquascopes », variable buoyancy trimaran,
- 1982 - 2000: « Aquaspace », sail trimaran with a transparent shell.

=== Other creations ===
- 1991: Institut français d’Informatique (Marne la Vallée),
- 1991: Larousse Formula 1 Factory (Signes),
- 1994: Environmental research center (Dunkerque),
- 2009: Stade aquatique de l'agglomération de Vichy,
- 2012: La Tontouta International Airport,
- 2013: Piscine Molitor.

== Research and projects ==
- Marine City « City in the Ocean » (United Arab Emirates),
- Embassair private airport terminals (London, New York),
- Malley Star tower on positive energy (Prilly-Lausanne, Switzerland),
- Shell Tower (United Arab Emirates),
- Atlantide Hotelia Complex.
- Seaspacelab : underwater laboratory (USA),
- Aquaspace III : underwater observation trimaran,
- SeaOrbiter : 58 m high, 31 immersed, SeaOrbiter is a project aimed at constant oceans observation. Drifting with the sea currents, this platform should enable divers and underwater robots to explore the marine life of the deep, underwater flaws and sunken ruins.

== Bibliography ==
- Habiter la mer, (EMOM, 1978);
- Les Enfants du Capitaine Némo, (Arthaud, 1985);
- De 20,000 Lieues sous les Mers à SeaOrbiter, (éditions Democratic Book, 2010)
