= Earth 300 =

Sustainability organization

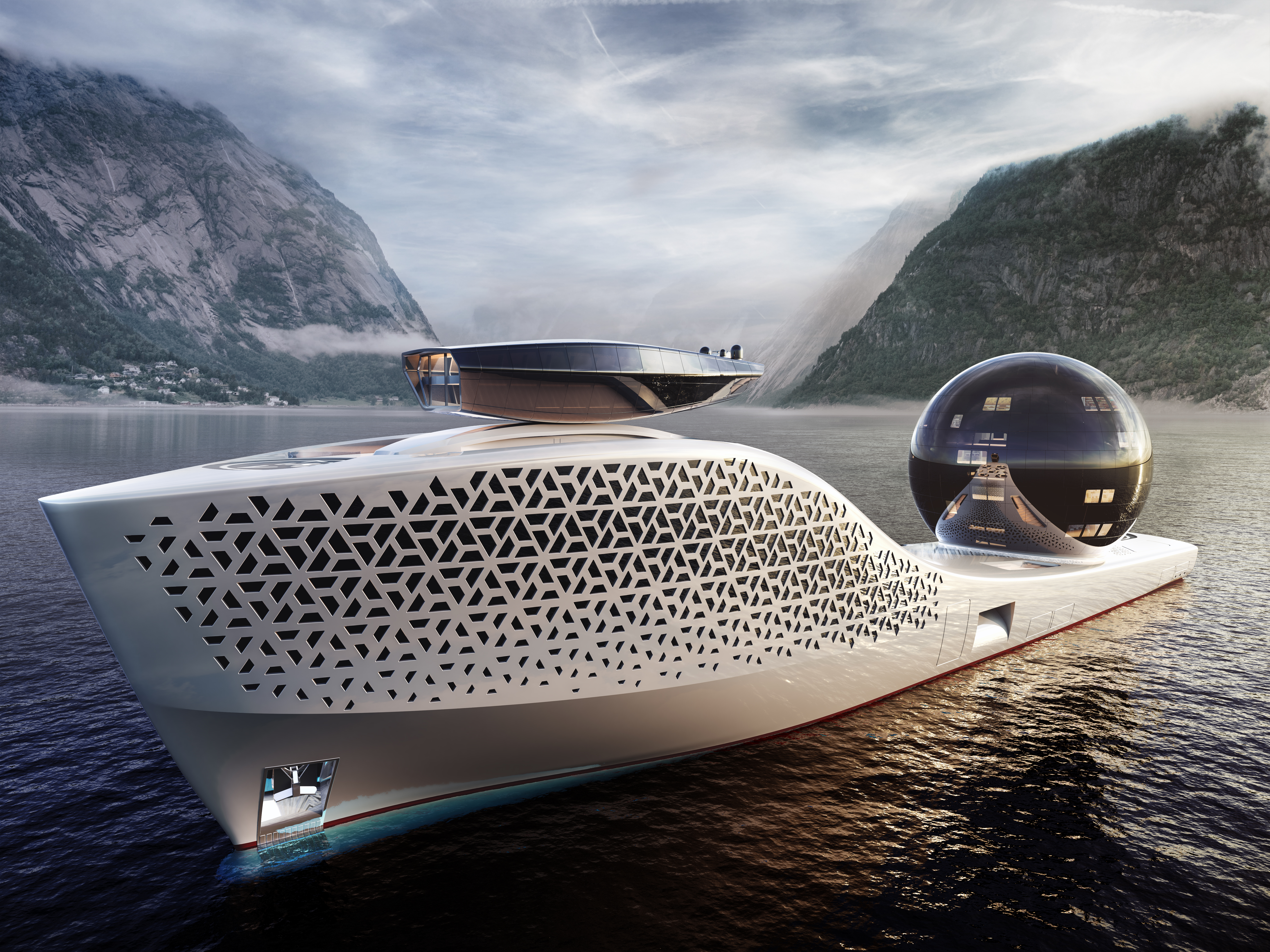
Design for the Earth 300 vessel

Earth 300 is an organization that aspires to both inspire and support oceanographic research and awareness of the climate crisis. It has released speculative designs for a scientific research vessel which, if built, would be the largest ever superyacht, 300 m (980 ft) long. It intends to host experts in diverse fields, enabling interdisciplinary research into climate change, oceanography, and sustainability issues. The vessel's distinctive appearance also aims to draw attention to the health of the climate and oceans. Earth 300 has assembled individuals from a variety of backgrounds and formed partnerships with companies to provide different aspects of the vessel's technology. The organization aimed to launch the vessel in 2025, but supply chain disruptions and increasing construction costs have resulted in delays in the vessel's construction.

== Goals and purpose ==
Earth 300 is the idea of Aaron Olivera. Olivera previously organised finance for the Porsche-designed Royal Falcon One superyacht. He was inspired to found the organization after seeing coral dying from ocean acidification while on a trip to the Maldives. Olivera describes the goal as "to build the Olympic torch of global science:" a vessel whose design will "capture peoples' attention but also their hearts and imaginations" and focus them on the problem of climate change.

The vessel was designed by Ivan Salas Jefferson whose firm, Iddes Yachts, worked with the Polish naval architecture firm NED. It is intended to support scientific research into global climate change and other major challenges while also raising public awareness. The design provides for 22 on-board laboratories and the first commercial ocean-going quantum computer. As well as inspiring the general public, the modernist design is intended to attract eco-tourists who would subsidise the voyages, allowing scientists and students to travel for free. There will be ten luxury suites for these passengers, and ten additional suites for people whose expertise or experience will help the voyage but who could not otherwise afford the voyage. Olivera has stated that the research conducted on Earth 300 will be open source, shared in real time with the rest of the scientific community.

== Proposed design ==
The design is for a vessel 300 m (980 ft) long and 60 m (200 ft) high. If built, it would be the largest superyacht to date. Designs include a helipad and a cantilevered observation deck. It is intended to accommodate more than 400 people, including 160 scientists, 20 experts-in-residence, and a crew of 165. The design places the vessel's science laboratories in a Science Sphere, a thirteen-storey-high structure whose shape is inspired by the Earth.

=== Propulsion ===
The vessel is intended to be eventually driven by a sustainable propulsion system with zero carbon emissions. The design proposes that it would be powered by a molten salt reactor, a kind of nuclear fission reactor that operates near atmospheric pressure rather than the high pressure of water-cooled reactors. The Earth 300 research vessel would be the first ship to use this type of reactor. Approval for the reactor would take five to seven years, so the designers are seeking a propulsion system based on green fuels to use in the interim.

== Partners and personnel ==
Earth 300's partners include Iddes Yachts, NED, Triton Submarines, and the Italian shipping company RINA. Technology firm IBM has joined the initiative to provide high performance computing. Earth 300 has an advisory group which includes Michael J. Silah, formerly of the National Oceanic and Atmospheric Administration Commissioned Officer Corps, and film producer Mario Kassar. Olivera, who is now Earth 300's CEO, envisages that the vessel will host scientists from marine-, earth- and climate science as well as experts from other fields including economics, art and engineering.

== Construction ==
The organization estimates construction will cost $700 million and has considered shipyards in Europe and South Korea. It expects to launch the vessel in 2025.

== Responses and coverage ==
The project has attracted media attention from publications including BBC Science Focus, Forbes, and Bloomberg News. Simon Redfern, dean of the college of science at Nanyang Technological University, described as "exciting" the prospect that Earth 300 would fill gaps in humanity's knowledge of the oceans. Martin Yates, a CTO at Dell Technologies, supports the project and has expressed hope that the vessel will be like "a space-station on Earth" equipped with the most advanced computing technologies.

Dawn Stover, writing for the Bulletin of the Atomic Scientists, referred to the project as "overhyped". Stover noted both the molten salt nuclear reactor and quantum computer touted by Earth 300 as crucial to the project have not been constructed. Stover has referred to Olivera's intended guests, which include Elon Musk and Michelle Obama, and the broader project as "[...] more aspirational than realistic".

== See also ==
- SeaOrbiter
