= Fortress of Peace =

- Wehrhafte Schweiz; Nous pouvons nous défendre
- Directed by: John Fernhout
- Written by: Gustav Däniker; Rudolf Farner
- Produced by: Lothar Wolff
- Release date: 1964
- Running time: 20 min.
- Country: Switzerland
- Languages: German, French, English
- Budget: CHF 1 mio.

Fortress of Peace, originally titled Wehrhafte Schweiz in German and Nous pouvons nous défendre in French, is a Swiss short film made in 1964, directed by John Fernhout and produced by Lothar Wolff. It was nominated for the 1965 Academy Award for Best Live Action Short Film.

== Summary ==
Wehrhafte Schweiz is a Swiss Army propaganda film, made for the Expo 64 national exhibition in the then-prevailing spirit of geistige Landesverteidigung (cultural national defense). It portrays the Swiss Army fighting against an unnamed, unseen enemy, using heavy weapons such as flamethrowers, artillery, tanks and bomber aircraft. After the enemy is repelled, the film closes with idyllic shots of beautiful Swiss landscapes. The 20-minute film was shot using the latest action film techniques in the Cinerama format on expensive MCS-70 Super Panorama 70mm stock.

== Reception ==
The film was a popular success in Switzerland, attracting more than four million viewers (about two thirds of the country's population). The project, led by Major General Gustav Däniker and by Rudolf Farner, a powerful advertising executive in civilian life, was however controversial because of its exorbitant CHF 1 million production cost, concerns about military secrecy and the use of foreign rather than Swiss creative staff. Critical opinion was mostly positive, although concerns were voiced about the film being too militaristic and aggressive, not highlighting the Swiss tradition of militia service, and for being too reminiscent of propaganda films by foreign totalitarian regimes. In a slightly adapted form, the film was also shown abroad under the English title Fortress of Peace.

== Restoration ==
In 2014, the deteriorated film stock was restored by the Swiss Army and Memoriav, a Swiss cultural heritage association, for public screenings in Switzerland on the occasion of the 50-year anniversary of Expo 64.
