= SeaOrbiter =

Proposed oceangoing research vessel

- Official Logo of the SeaOrbiter Project

General characteristics
- Type: Research/Semi-submersible
- Height: 51 m (167 ft)

The SeaOrbiter, also known as Sea Orbiter (two words), is a proposed oceangoing research vessel based on the ideas of French architect and oceanographer Jacques Rougerie. Construction was due to start in 2014 but by May 2015, only the Eye of SeaOrbiter has been completed, and as of 2024, there is no news of any other construction.

The SeaOrbiter is planned to allow scientists and others a residential yet mobile research station positioned under the oceans' surface, with laboratories, workshops, living quarters and a pressurized deck to support divers and submarines.

SeaOrbiter is a project of the "Floating oceanographic laboratory" organisation. It is headed by Jacques Rougerie, oceanographer Jacques Piccard and astronaut Jean-Loup Chrétien. In 2012 the cost was estimated to be around US$52.7 million.

== Description ==
As proposed, the laboratory would be a semi-submersible oceangoing craft weighing 1,000 tonnes (2,200,000 lb). It would have a total height of 51 metres (167 ft) with 31 metres (102 ft) below sea level.

It is designed to float vertically and drift with the ocean currents but has two small propellers allowing it to modify its trajectory and maneuver in confined waters. Underwater robots would be sent from the laboratory to explore the seabed. The hull would be made of an alloy of aluminum and magnesium.

== See also ==
- Ben Franklin (PX-15), a 1968 research vessel designed to house a six-man crew for up to 30 days of oceanographic study in the depths of the Gulf Stream.
- Earth 300, a proposed superyacht intended for scientific research
- NEEMO, ongoing NASA program
