= Apollo's Chariot =

Roller coaster at Busch Gardens Williamsburg

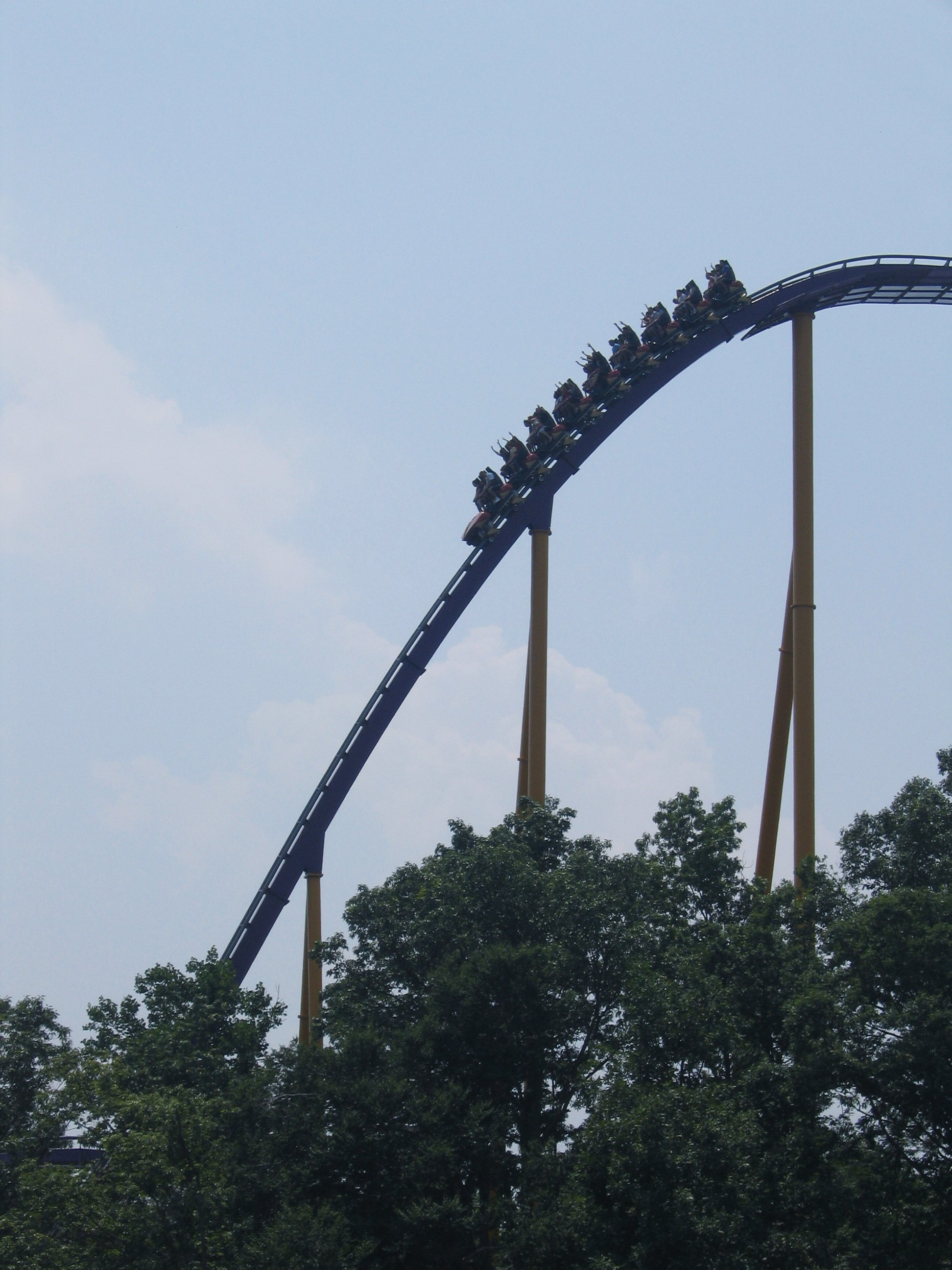
- The first drop of Apollo's Chariot is at an angle of 65°.

Busch Gardens Williamsburg
- Location: Busch Gardens Williamsburg
- Park section: Festa Italia
- Coordinates: 37.23480°N 76.64130°W
- Status: Operating
- Opening date: March 27, 1999
- Cost: US$20 million

General statistics
- Type: Steel
- Manufacturer: Bolliger & Mabillard
- Designer: Werner Stengel
- Model: Hyper Coaster
- Track layout: Out and Back/Terrain
- Lift/launch system: Chain lift hill
- Height: 170 ft (52 m)
- Drop: 210 ft (64 m)
- Length: 4,882 ft (1,488 m)
- Speed: 73 mph (117 km/h)
- Inversions: 0
- Duration: 2:15
- Max vertical angle: 65°
- Capacity: 1,750 riders per hour
- G-force: 4.1
- Height restriction: 52 in (132 cm)
- Trains: 3 trains with 9 cars; riders arranged 4 across in a single row for a total of 36 riders per train
- Quick Queue available
- Single rider line available
- Apollo's Chariot at RCDB

Video

Apollo's Chariot is a steel roller coaster at the Busch Gardens Williamsburg amusement park in James City County, Virginia, United States. The ride was the first Hyper Coaster designed by Swiss firm Bolliger & Mabillard. It officially opened to the public on March 27, 1999. This coaster is themed to the Greek and Roman god Apollo, who is the god of the sun, music, and healing. Apollo used his chariot to control the directions of the sun.

The 4,882-foot-long (1,488 m) ride is characterized by eight airtime hills, with heights ranging between 49 and 131 feet (15 and 40 m). Riders ascend 170 feet (52 m) on the chain lift hill before dropping 210 feet (64 m) at an angle of 65°. Apollo's Chariot has been well received, consistently ranking in the top 10 of the annual Golden Ticket Awards from Amusement Today.

== History ==
Apollo's Chariot was announced on September 5, 1998, as the tallest and fastest roller coaster at Busch Gardens Williamsburg. An article in the Daily Press on January 23, 1999, mentioned that the ride was nearing completion with approximately 20 pieces of track left to be installed. Apollo's Chariot performed its first test runs in mid-February 1999.

The ride opened on March 27, 1999. Upon opening, it was the first hypercoaster from Swiss manufacturer Bolliger & Mabillard. Busch Gardens held Apollo's Chariot's opening ceremony three days later on March 30. Italian fashion model Fabio Lanzoni was brought in to promote the new roller coaster; this was part of Busch Gardens Williamsburg's annual program of celebrity appearances. During the ride's inaugural run, a 10-pound goose struck him in the face leaving his nose covered with blood. He was treated at a nearby hospital for minor cuts, while the goose was killed on impact. In 2021, he clarified that the goose hit a camera and a piece of that camera hit him in the face. A reproduction simulation in 2024 concluded that it was unlikely the goose struck Lanzoni directly in the face.

== Characteristics ==
The 4,882-foot-long (1,488 m) Apollo's Chariot is a Hyper Coaster made by Bolliger & Mabillard. The park's existing terrain is utilized to allow a 170-foot-tall (52 m) lift hill to be translated into a first drop stretching 210 feet (64 m). With a top speed of 73 miles per hour (117 km/h), the ride features eight airtime hills. Riders of Apollo's Chariot experience up to 4.1 times the force of gravity on the 2-minute, 15-second ride. Apollo's Chariot operates with three trains with nine cars per train. Riders are arranged four across in a single row for a total of 36 riders per train. This configuration of trains allows for a theoretical capacity of 1,750 riders per hour. Riders are restrained by a lap bar and the seats are elevated so riders' feet do not touch the ground.

== Ride experience ==
The final drop on Apollo's Chariot

After departing from the station, the station will spiel the send-off recording "Thank you and enjoy your voyage to the sun on the wings of Apollo's Chariot!" as the train begins to climb the 170-foot (52 m) chain lift hill while loudspeakers play the official theme song. When the train reaches the top, it drops down a few feet in a pre-drop. The pre-drop serves to reduce the stress and pull of the chain. After the pre-drop, the train goes down a 210 foot (64 m) drop toward a water-filled ravine at a 65-degree angle and reaches a top speed of 73 miles per hour (117 km/h). At the end of the ravine, the train enters a second airtime hill with a 131-foot (40 m) drop. A short, narrow, above-ground tunnel is at the bottom of the second drop. After the tunnel, the train descends a 144-foot (44 m) drop, which banks to the left as it descends. The train then goes through an upward helix. Coming out of the helix, the train drops 102 feet (31 m) then turns right and rises up into the mid-course brake run. The train drops 48 feet (15 m) out of the brake run followed by another drop at 87 feet (27 m) toward the ravine. The train then banks right, makes a 38-foot (12 m) dip, turns left and goes through a small 16-foot (4.9 m) dip. The train then makes one last 49-foot (15 m) airtime drop before climbing up and into the final brake run. There is approximately 26 seconds of airtime during the 2-minute, 15-second ride.

== Incidents ==
On July 15, 2018, a family from Virginia Beach, Virginia, suffered injuries as they were riding the roller coaster due to a ride operator accidentally pressing the emergency stop button, causing them to report concussions the next day. In July 2019, a guest from Virginia Beach sued Busch Gardens Williamsburg's parent company SeaWorld Parks & Entertainment. The guest claimed that he had suffered severe injuries on Apollo's Chariot due to the previous year's emergency-stop incident.

== Reception ==
When Apollo's Chariot opened, the Daily Press described it as setting "a new standard in stomach-churning fun", enhanced by the fact that the ride had 26 seconds of airtime. In the ride's debut year, Busch Gardens Williamsburg had lower than expected levels of attendance. This was attributed to prolonged periods of inclement weather. As a result of this, the park planned to relaunch Apollo's Chariot in 2000 in an attempt to drive attendance.

In Amusement Today's annual Golden Ticket Awards, Apollo's Chariot has consistently ranked highly. In its debut year, it ranked position 20. In the 13 years since, the coaster has consistently ranked higher, peaking at #4 in 2005, 2007, 2008 and 2012.

Golden Ticket Awards: Top steel Roller Coasters
Year									1998	1999
Ranking									–	20
Year	2000	2001	2002	2003	2004	2005	2006	2007	2008	2009
Ranking	9	7	5	5	5	4	5	4	4	5
Year	2010	2011	2012	2013	2014	2015	2016	2017	2018	2019
Ranking	4	7	4	5	7	6	6	11	6	8
Year	2020	2021	2022	2023	2024	2025	2026			
Ranking	N/A	11	8	11	25	14	20			
