= Titan (Six Flags Over Texas) =

Steel roller coaster

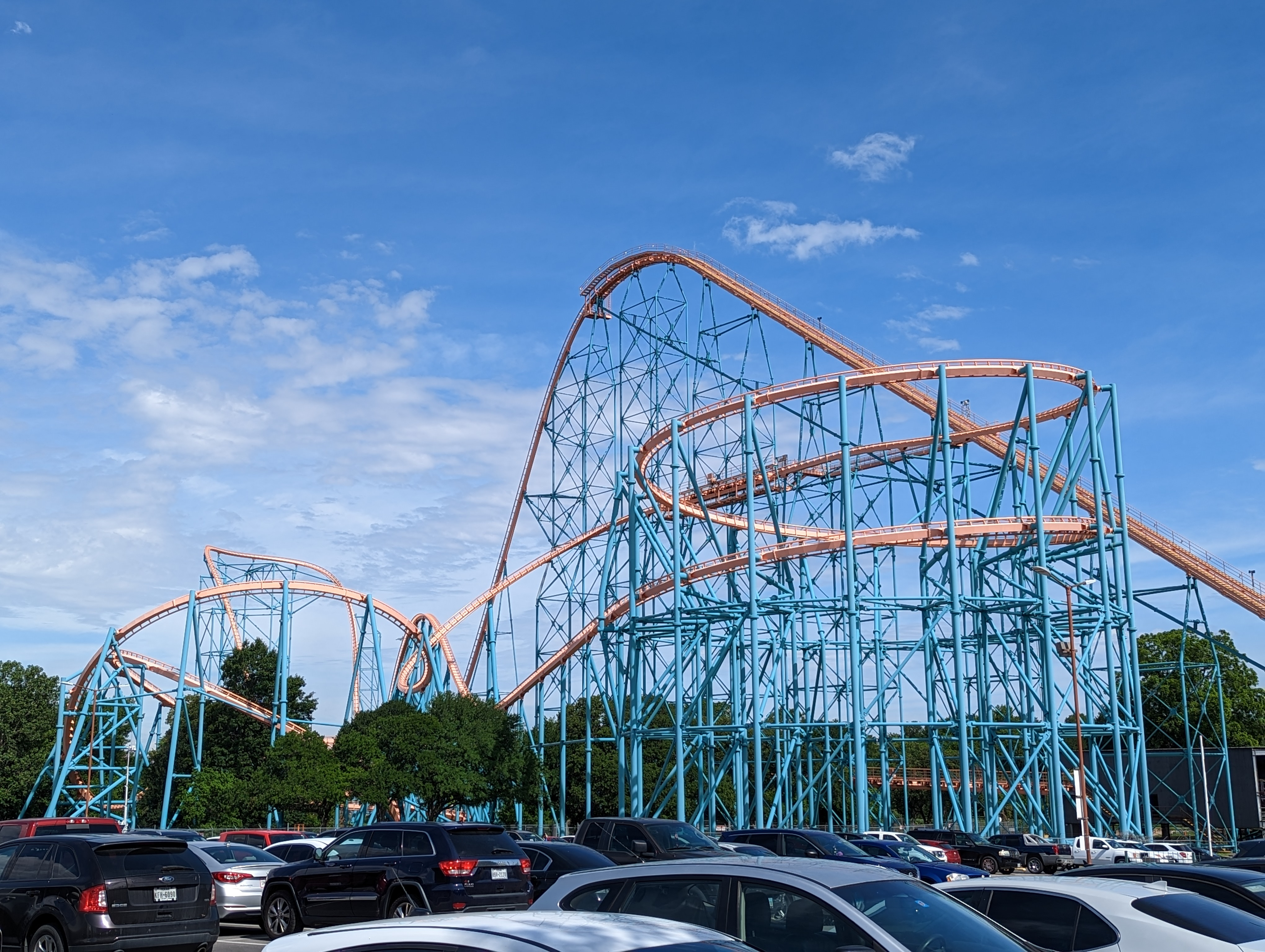

Six Flags Over Texas
- Location: Six Flags Over Texas
- Park section: Texas
- Coordinates: 32°45′20″N 97°04′27″W
- Status: Operating
- Soft opening date: April 26, 2001
- Opening date: April 27, 2001

General statistics
- Type: Steel
- Manufacturer: Giovanola
- Designer: Werner Stengel
- Model: Hyper Coaster
- Track layout: Twister
- Lift/launch system: Chain lift hill
- Height: 245 ft (75 m)
- Drop: 255 ft (78 m)
- Length: 5,312 ft (1,619 m)
- Speed: 85 mph (137 km/h)
- Inversions: 0
- Duration: 3:30
- Capacity: 1600 riders per hour
- Height restriction: 48 in (122 cm)
- Trains: 3 trains with 5 cars; riders arranged 2 across in 3 rows for a total of 30 riders per train
- Website: Official website
- Fast Lane available
- Titan at RCDB

Titan is a steel roller coaster located at Six Flags Over Texas in Arlington, Texas. Built by Giovanola and designed by Werner Stengel, the 245-foot (75 m) hypercoaster features an out and back and twister track layout, a 255-foot (78 m) drop, and a maximum speed of 85 mph (137 km/h). Titan opened as the tallest, fastest, and longest roller coaster in Texas.

== History ==
Six Flags Over Texas made plans to add a hypercoaster to the park's lineup with an early proposal from Arrow Dynamics, placing a new roller coaster over the park's reservoir next to the Judge Roy Scream attraction. In August 2000, the park publicly revealed their plans in celebration of the park's 40th anniversary. Although specifications were withheld, they confirmed Giovanola as the manufacturer and that the new coaster would be similar to Goliath at Six Flags Magic Mountain and constructed in the Texas section of the park. As survey markers began to appear in September, it became clear that the new coaster would extend from the Texas section to the employee cantina, pool and softball fields then out into the parking lot. By the time the official announcement, employee areas had been demolished, and teal-colored supports were beginning to arrive stacked in the parking lot. Construction was completed in March 2001 and testing began the following month. A media preview was held on April 26, 2001, and Titan opened to the public the following day.

Titan became one of the top ten fastest roller coasters in the United States, with its speed matched by Phantom's Revenge at Kennywood and Goliath at Six Flags Magic Mountain.

For the 2013 season, new seat belts were installed on each train. In 2025, the park repainted Titan red, white, and blue, referencing state colors.

== Ride experience ==
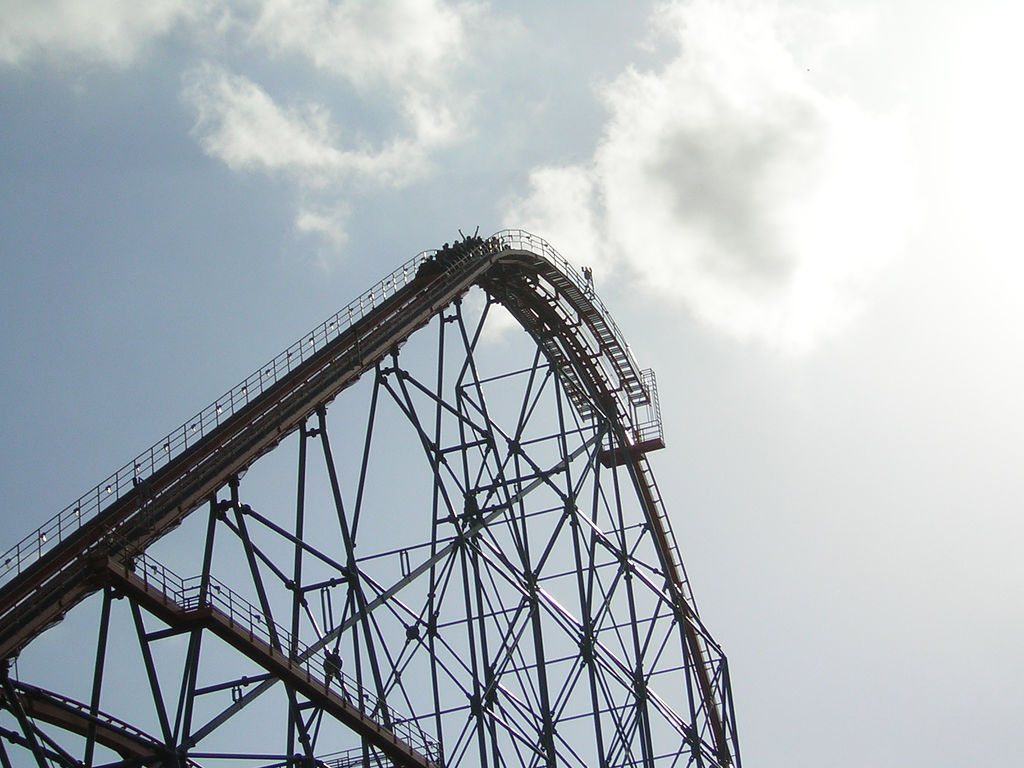
The lift hill

Titan begins with a slow U-turn out of the station then a climb up a 245-foot (75 m) hill. At the summit, the train drops 255-foot (78 m) into a 120-foot (37 m) underground tunnel. Immediately after the tunnel, riders are taken through a large turnaround to the right. Following the turnaround, riders encounter a large camelback that provides significant airtime. The train subsequently enters a 540 degree upwards helix leading to the mid-course brake run. The train maneuvers a left hand drop, leading into an over-banked turn. This is followed by a 570 degree downward helix, delivering about six seconds of 4.5 G's to riders. Afterwards, the trains navigate a banked turn to the left and then another to the right. After this, the train enters the final brake run and returns to the station.

== Characteristics ==
=== Track ===
With one difference, the overall track layout of Titan is identical to that of Goliath at Six Flags Magic Mountain, the difference being that Goliath is 10' shorter in height and lacks the upward helix into the mid-course brake run, instead having a simple uphill left turn.

Titan's supports used 2.8 million pounds of steel to manufacture. When it was built, Titan was the longest roller coaster ever to be built at a Six Flags park.

=== Trains ===
Titan operates with up to three trains, each with five cars holding three rows of two riders for a total of 30 riders per train. The three trains are colored red, orange, and yellow. It will usually run only two trains on slow days, with the unused train stored in the train's storage shed (the train that is unused from day to day is swapped out on a regular basis).

During the summer months, as the train rolls into the station, a cloud of mist can be seen under the train. Owing to problems with the wheels on the trains overheating, water is sprayed on the wheel assembly to help cool down the wheels after the train completes the course.

== Incidents ==
Like Goliath, Titan has been known for occasionally causing blackouts or greyouts in the helices. These can be exacerbated during summer and the extreme Texas heat. Because of the complaints about the G-forces given during the second helix, the trains are severely slowed at the mid-course brakes, almost to the point of stopping.

== Rankings ==
Golden Ticket Awards: Top steel Roller Coasters
Year									1998	1999
Ranking									–	–
Year	2000	2001	2002	2003	2004	2005	2006	2007	2008	2009
Ranking	–	21	23	27	25	34 (tied)	27	26	24	37
Year	2010	2011	2012	2013	2014	2015	2016	2017	2018	2019
Ranking	42	25	36	42 (tied)	–	–	–	–	–	–
Year	2020	2021	2022	2023	2024	2025	2026			
Ranking	N/A	–	–	–	–	–	–			
