= Ben Franklin (PX-15) =

Crewed underwater submersible

Coordinates: 49°16′39.9″N 123°8′51.8″W

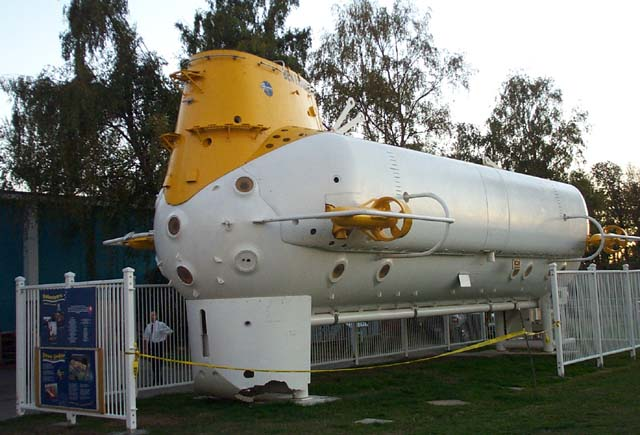
- Ben Franklin/PX-15 on display

History

United States
- Name: Ben Franklin
- Namesake: Benjamin Franklin
- Builder: Giovanola/Grumman
- Laid down: 1966
- Launched: 1968
- In service: 1969
- Out of service: 1971
- Status: Museum ship

General characteristics
- Type: Submersible
- Displacement: 130 long tons (132 t)
- Length: 48 ft 9 in (14.86 m)
- Beam: 21 ft 6 in (6.55 m)
- Height: 20 ft (6.1 m)
- Propulsion: 4 × electric motors, lead batteries
- Test depth: Crush depth: 4,000 ft (1,200 m)
- Crew: 6
- Armament: None

The Ben Franklin mesoscaphe, also known as the Grumman/Piccard PX-15, is a crewed underwater submersible, built in 1968. It was the brainchild of explorer and inventor Jacques Piccard. The research vessel was designed to house a six-man crew for up to 30 days of oceanographic study in the depths of the Gulf Stream. NASA became involved, seeing this as an opportunity to study the effects of long-term, continuous close confinement, a useful simulation of long space flights.

The ship was named after American Founding Father Benjamin Franklin.

== Design and operation ==
The Ben Franklin was built between 1966 and 1968 at the Giovanola fabrication plant in Monthey, Switzerland by Piccard and the Grumman Aircraft Engineering Corporation headed by Donald B Terrana, then disassembled and shipped to Florida. The vessel is the first submarine to be built to American Bureau of Shipping (ABS) standards. With a design crush depth of 4,000 feet (1,200 m), it was designed to drift along at neutral buoyancy at depths between 600 and 2,000 feet (180 and 610 metres). The 130-ton ship has four external electric propulsion pods, primarily used for altitude trimming. It is powered by tons of lead batteries stored outside the hull. Its length is 48 feet 9 inches (14.86 m), with a beam of 21 feet 6 inches (6.55 m) and a height of 20 feet (6.1 m). Piccard insisted on 29 observation portholes, despite the objections of engineers over the inclusion of potentially fatal weak points.

Route of the Ben Franklin/PX-15

It began its voyage on July 14, 1969, off Palm Beach, Florida, with Piccard as the mission leader. Accompanied by surface support vessels, it resurfaced on August 14, 1,444 miles (2,324 km) away, 300 miles (480 km) south of Halifax, Nova Scotia, Canada. The Ben Franklin made a few more dives after 1969, including the first deep-sea dive for Robert Ballard, the discoverer of the wreck of the Titanic.

After running aground on a reef in 1971, the Ben Franklin was sold to Vancouver businessman John Horton, only to languish for nearly three decades on the North Shore. In December 1999, with a sudden decision to either move or scrap the submersible, it was offered to the Vancouver Maritime Museum. After refurbishment, the submersible was placed in front of the museum.

== Crew ==
- Jacques Piccard, the senior scientist on board, as well as the designer and engineer of the vessel
- Chester May, NASA scientist in charge of observing the crew
- Don Kazimir, Chief Pilot and a former navy submarine officer
- Erwin Aebersold, an associate of Jacques' and co-pilot to Kazimir
- Frank Busby, US Navy Oceanographer
- Ken Haigh, British Royal Navy Oceanographer

== Influence ==
Ambient artists Mathieu Ruhlmann and Celer collaboratively released an album called Mesoscaphe in 2008 dedicated to the voyage of the Ben Franklin.

== See also ==
- SeaOrbiter, a proposed drifting oceanographic research laboratory also associated with Piccard
