= Giovanola =

Defunct steel manufacturing company

- Industry: Manufacturing
- Founded: 1888
- Founder: Joseph Giovanola
- Defunct: 2004
- Fate: Bankrupt
- Headquarters: Monthey, Switzerland
- Area served: Worldwide
- Products: Amusement rides, roller coasters

Giovanola Frères SA was a prominent steel manufacturing company based in Monthey, Switzerland. It was known for building electrical power stations, water storage tanks, pipelines, boilers, highway bridges, submarines, ski lifts and many other steel products. The company started out as a small metal forging shop, founded by Joseph Giovanola in 1888. Joseph Sr. died in 1904, and the company was taken over by his sons, the eldest of which, Joseph Jr., was just 17 years of age. By 1930 the company had grown to the point that it required a new factory which was constructed in Monthey.

Giovanola built several submarines: the Auguste Piccard, the Ben Franklin and the F.-A. Forel.

== Amusement rides ==
In the 1980s Giovanola entered the ride market serving as a subcontractor to Intamin, providing structural steel and parts for its roller coasters and other rides such as swinging ships. Giovanola also fabricated entire rides such as the FreeFall which was also marketed by Intamin.

In the mid-1980s two Giovanola engineers, Claude Mabillard and Walter Bolliger, developed a new type of roller coaster track system utilizing a box beam spine. The new-style track first made its appearance on a production-model coaster sold by Intamin as a Space Diver. However, only one was sold to Six Flags Great America. It opened in 1985 as Z-Force. A year later Shockwave at Six Flags Magic Mountain, a stand-up coaster, opened utilizing the same box-beam track. In 1987 Bolliger and Mabillard left the company and founded their own business, Bolliger & Mabillard.

In 1998 Giovanola Amusement Rides Worldwide (GARW) was founded to sell amusement rides built by Giovanola Frères SA. Both companies were based in Monthey, Switzerland. The company remained in business for three years and sold three roller coasters: Goliath at Six Flags Magic Mountain, Titan at Six Flags Over Texas and Anaconda at South Africa's Gold Reef City.

GARW filed for bankruptcy protection in 2001 after the completion of Titan at Six Flags Over Texas which ended the roller-coaster-building business. In 2000 a hydraulic penstock at the Bieudron Hydroelectric Power Station, which was manufactured by Giovanola Frères, failed, rendering the power station inoperative. That incident caused more financial problems for the already weakened company. In 2003–2004 the company filed for bankruptcy and ceased operation. The factory was purchased by the municipality of Monthey and is currently managed by Gessimo, which sub-leases the space to multiple tenants.

=== List of roller coasters ===
Giovanola is credited with building three roller coasters independently. Giovanola served as the subcontractor on 22 roller coasters around the world.

Name	Model	Park	Country	Opened	Status	Ref
Anaconda	Inverted Coaster	Gold Reef City	South Africa	1999	Operating	
Goliath	Hyper Coaster	Six Flags Magic Mountain	United States	2000	Operating	
Titan	Hyper Coaster	Six Flags Over Texas	United States	2001	Operating	

== Ropeways ==
Giovanola manufactured ropeways and ski lifts from 1949 until the 1970s. The company is known for producing the Giovanola gravity clamp, a type of detachable grip, which was used on the company's own gondola lifts, as well as being licensed to many other manufacturers of the era, including Habegger, Von Roll, WSO Städeli, Hall, and Skirail. As the gravity clamp does not meet modern safety standards, European law requires all systems in Europe built with this design to cease operations by 2025. As a result, these gondola lifts are becoming increasingly rare.

== See also ==
- Category:Roller coasters manufactured by Giovanola
- List of aerial lift manufacturers
