= Auguste Piccard (PX-8) =

First passenger submarine

Coordinates: 47°03′07.4″N 08°20′13.2″E

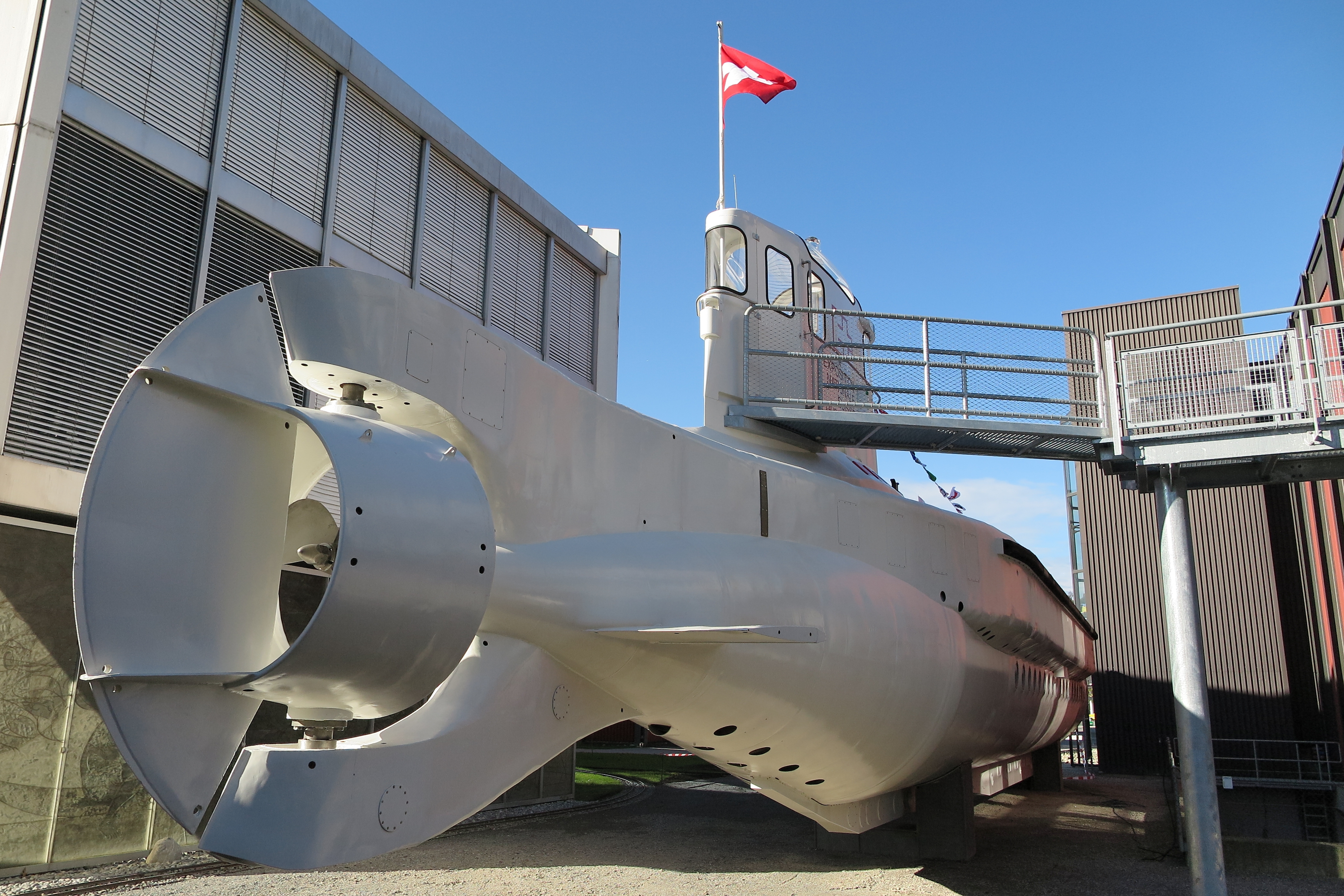
- Auguste Piccard in the Swiss Museum of Transport (2014)

History

Switzerland
- Name: Auguste Piccard
- Namesake: Auguste Piccard
- Builder: Giovanola Frères SA
- Launched: 27 February 1964 (Le Bouveret)
- In service: 1964
- Status: Swiss Museum of Transport

General characteristics
- Type: Submarine
- Displacement: 222 t (218 long tons; 245 short tons)
- Length: 28.50 m (93.5 ft)
- Beam: 6.80 m (22.3 ft)
- Height: 7.43 m (24.4 ft)
- Draught: 3.63 m (11.9 ft)
- Propulsion: electric motors, batteries
- Speed: 6 kn (11 km/h; 6.9 mph)
- Endurance: 48 hours
- Crew: 4 (and 40 passengers)
- Armament: None

The Auguste Piccard mesoscaphe, also known simply as the Mésoscaphe, was a crewed underwater submarine designed in 1964 by Jacques Piccard, son of Auguste Piccard. It was the world's first passenger submarine, built for Expo64, the 1964 Swiss national exhibition in Lausanne. It was built at the Giovanola fabrication plant in Monthey and the first immersion took place in Le Bouveret on 27 February 1964. It has a total of 45 Plexiglas portholes, with 20 on each side for the 40 passengers.

The Auguste Piccard achieved 1,100 dives in Lake Geneva with 33,000 visitors in 1964 and 1965, to a depth of approximately 150 metres. The ride cost 40 Swiss francs and was the hit of the national exhibition. From 1969 to 1984, it achieved scientific and industrial observation dives in the Gulf of Mexico.

The ship is currently on display at the Swiss Museum of Transport in Lucerne. It was fully restored for the first time between 2005 and 2014, the restoration taking 28,000 hours.
