= Wild Thing =

Wild Thing or Wild Things can refer to:

== Books and comics ==
- Wild Thing (comics), Marvel Comics superheroine
- The Wild Things, Dave Eggers novel

== Film and television ==
- Wild Thing (film), a 1987 film directed by Max Reid
- "Wild Thing" (ALF), a 1987 television episode
- "Wild Thing", My Lady Jane episode
- "Wild Thing", Super Mario Bros. Super Show! episode
- Wild Things (film series)
  - Wild Things (film), a 1998 film starring Matt Dillon, Kevin Bacon, Denise Richards, and Neve Campbell
  - Wild Things 2, a 2004 sequel to the above film
  - Wild Things: Diamonds in the Rough, a 2005 film in the Wild Things series
  - Wild Things: Foursome, a 2010 film in the Wild Things series
- Wild Things (2010 TV series), a reality television series
- Wild Things (2027 TV series)
- Wild Things with Dominic Monaghan, a 2012 wildlife documentary series
- Wild Things (game show), a 2015 game show
- Ricky "Wild Thing" Vaughn, a fictional baseball pitcher in Major League and Major League II

== Music ==
- Wild Things!, a 1966 album by the Ventures
- "Wild Thing" (The Troggs song), a 1966 song written by Chip Taylor
- Wild Things (EP), a 1981 EP by The Creatures
- "Wild Thing" (Tone Lōc song), a 1989 song by rapper Tone Lōc
- "Wild Thing", a 2011 song by Noah & The Whale
- "Wild Things" (song), a 2016 song by Canadian singer Alessia Cara
- Wild Things (album), a 2016 album by Ladyhawke

== Sport and leisure ==
- Wild Thing (Valleyfair), a steel hypercoaster at Valleyfair in Shakopee, Minnesota
- Wild Thing, a steel roller coaster at Wild Waves Theme Park in Federal Way, Washington
- Washington Wild Things, a minor-league baseball team
- ULBI Wild Thing, German ultralight aircraft
- Wild Thing (yacht), a maxi yacht built in 2003

=== Sports people ===
- Mitch Williams (born 1964), American baseball pitcher nicknamed "Wild Thing"
- Anderson Varejão (born 1982), Brazilian basketball player nicknamed "Wild Thing"
- Shaun Tait (born 1983), Australian cricketer dubbed "The Wild Thing"
- Kyle Busch (born 1985), American stock car racing driver nicknamed "Wild Thing"
- Steven May, retired American professional wrestler who competed as of 1987 as "Wild Thing" Steve Ray in the UWF

== Other ==
- Wild Things (organization), a network of people engaged with nature in the Chicago area
- Wild Thing (podcast), a podcast about the relationship between science and society

== See also ==
- Where the Wild Things Are (disambiguation)
