= Out-and-back roller coaster =

Type of roller coaster layout

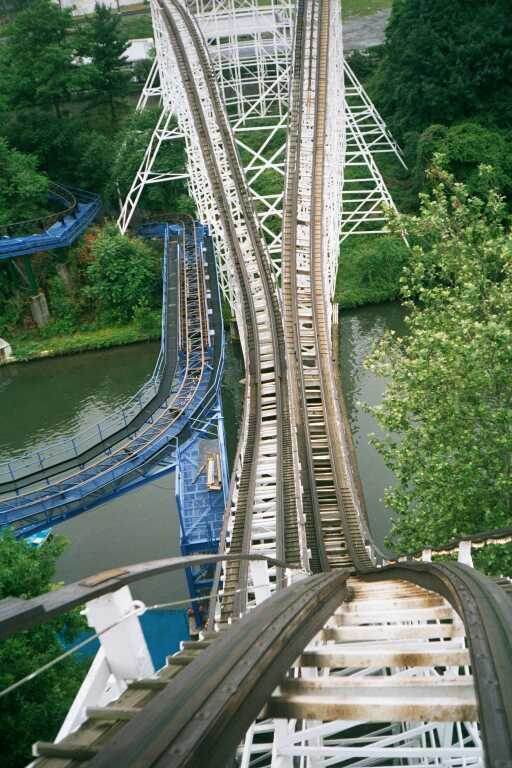
Drop of Comet at Hersheypark, a double out-and-back roller coaster

Out-and-back is a type of roller coaster layout in which the vehicle climbs a lift hill soon after leaving the station, races out to the far end of the track after the initial drop, performs a 180 degree turn, and returns to the station. Some out-and-back coasters perform more complicated turns at the far end of the track.

This particular design was popular in the first half of the 1900s and is easy to design and construct. With an out-and-back design, the hills on the way out are large, and gradually decrease in size. The hills on the way back are usually "bunny hops", or small hills created to maximize airtime. This layout is more commonly found among older wooden coasters, though modern out-and-back steel coasters exist as well.

== Design variants ==
=== Out-and-back ===
The simplest out-and-back layout resembles a flattened oval when viewed from above, though they can be more complex. In profile, the train leaves the station and ascends the lift hill. After gaining kinetic energy from the initial drop, the train ascends several subsequent hills before it enters the turnaround at the far end of the track. Exiting the turnaround, the train descends a hill to gain speed again before entering several smaller hills that lead into the brake run, where it will again turn around to reenter the station.

Examples of this layout include Blue Streak at Cedar Point, The Racer at Kings Island, and Big Dipper at Pleasure Beach Resort.

=== Double out-and-back ===
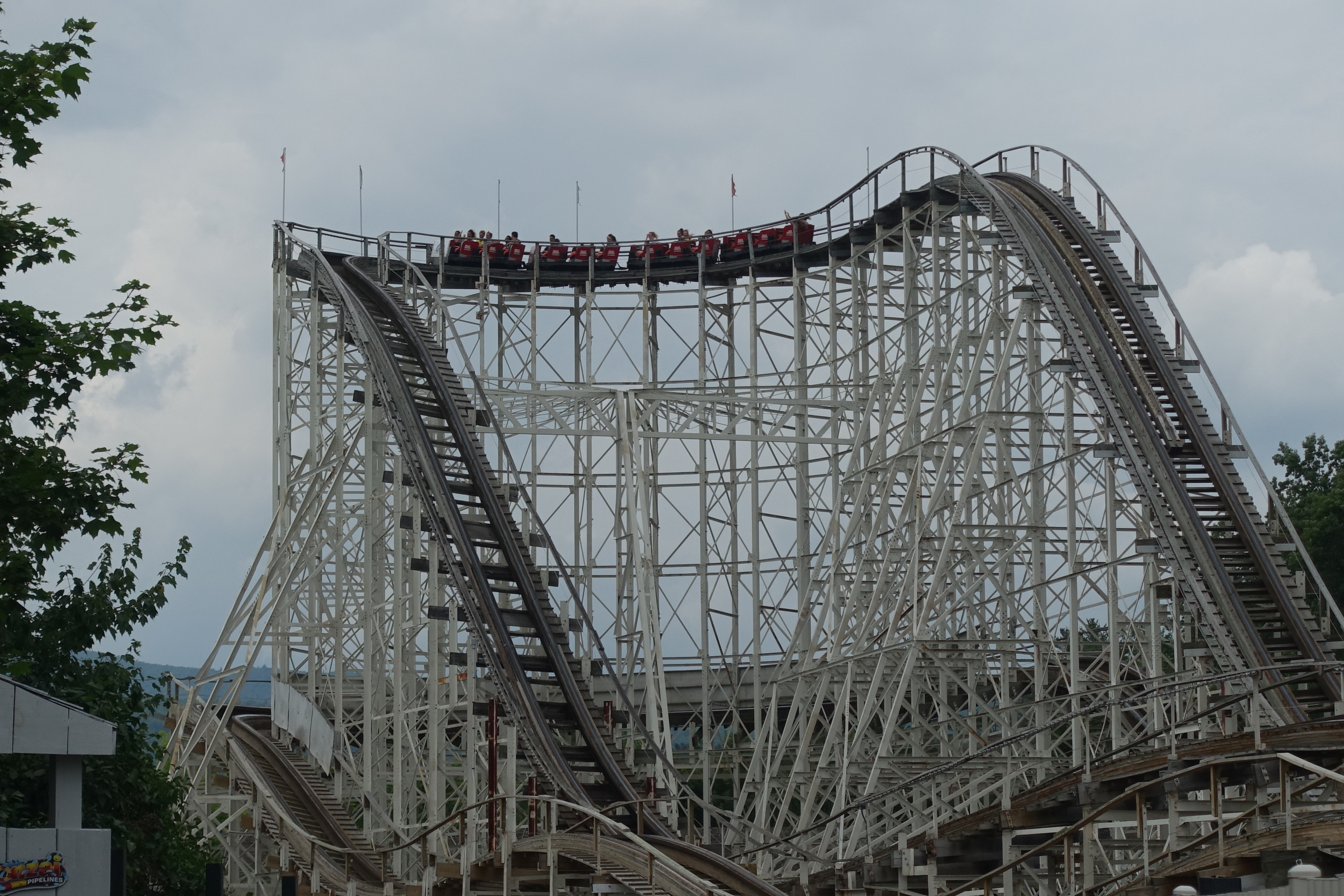
The red train of The Comet at Six Flags Great Escape has ascended the first large "out" hill and is about to turn to the left to head "back"

A variation of the layout known as a double out-and-back has a layout where the train travels from the station out to the far end, then returning past the station in another turnaround before traveling out to the far end again, and finally returning to the station in the brake run.

Examples of this layout include The Comet at Six Flags Great Escape and Hurricane Harbor in New York, Phoenix at Knoebels Amusement Resort in Pennsylvania, and GhostRider at Knott’s Berry Farm in California.

=== Triple out-and-back ===
These coasters travel back and forth between the out and back points three times. The resulting appearance is often hard to discern from true twister coasters, which are more free-form in their designs. An example of this type of ride is the Coney Island Cyclone.

== Examples ==
This is not an exhaustive list.

Coaster	Park	Year opened	Manufacturer
American Eagle	Six Flags Great America	1981	Intamin
Apollo's Chariot	Busch Gardens Williamsburg	1999	Bolliger & Mabillard
Behemoth	Canada's Wonderland	2008	Bolliger & Mabillard
Big Dipper	Pleasure Beach Resort	1923	William Strickler
Big One	Blackpool Pleasure Beach	1994	Arrow Dynamics
Blue Streak	Cedar Point	1964	Philadelphia Toboggan Coasters
Boulder Dash	Lake Compounce	2000	Custom Coasters International
Cannon Ball	Lake Winnepesaukah	1967	Philadelphia Toboggan Coasters
Comet	Hersheypark	1946	Philadelphia Toboggan Coasters
Coney Island Cyclone	Luna Park	1927	Vernon Keenan
The Comet	Great Escape	1994	Philadelphia Toboggan Coasters
Giant Dipper	Santa Cruz Beach Boardwalk	1924	Arthur Looff
GhostRider	Knott's Berry Farm	1998	Custom Coasters International
Goliath	La Ronde	2006	Bolliger & Mabillard
Goliath	Six Flags Over Georgia	2006	Bolliger & Mabillard
Great American Scream Machine	Six Flags Over Georgia	1973	Philadelphia Toboggan Coasters
High Roller	Valleyfair	1976	Rauenhorst Corporation
Jack Rabbit	Seabreeze Amusement Park	1920	Harry C. Baker
Judge Roy Scream	Six Flags Over Texas	1980	William Cobb & Associates
Leviathan	Canada's Wonderland	2012	Bolliger & Mabillard
Magnum XL-200	Cedar Point	1989	Arrow Dynamics
Mamba	Worlds of Fun	1998	D. H. Morgan Manufacturing
The Mighty Canadian Minebuster	Canada's Wonderland	1981	Taft Broadcasting
Nitro	Six Flags Great Adventure	2001	Bolliger & Mabillard
Phoenix	Knoebels Amusement Resort	1985	Philadelphia Toboggan Coasters
Predator	Darien Lake	1990	Dinn Corporation
The Racer	Kings Island	1972	Philadelphia Toboggan Coasters
Racer 75	Kings Dominion	1975	Philadelphia Toboggan Coasters
Roller Coaster	Great Yarmouth Pleasure Beach	1932	Erich Heidrich
Rollo Coaster	Idlewild Park	1938	Philadelphia Toboggan Coasters
Screamin' Eagle	Six Flags St. Louis	1976	Philadelphia Toboggan Coasters
Shivering Timbers	Michigan's Adventure	1998	Custom Coasters International
Steel Force	Dorney Park & Wildwater Kingdom	1997	D. H. Morgan Manufacturing
Tornado	Adventureland	1978	Frontier Construction Company
The Voyage	Holiday World & Splashin' Safari	2006	The Gravity Group
Wildcat	Lake Compounce	1927	Dinn Corporation
Wild Beast	Canada's Wonderland	1981	Taft Broadcasting
Wild Thing	Valleyfair	1996	D. H. Morgan Manufacturing
Yankee Cannonball	Canobie Lake Park	1930	Philadelphia Toboggan Coasters
