= Steel Eel =

Roller coaster at SeaWorld San Antonio

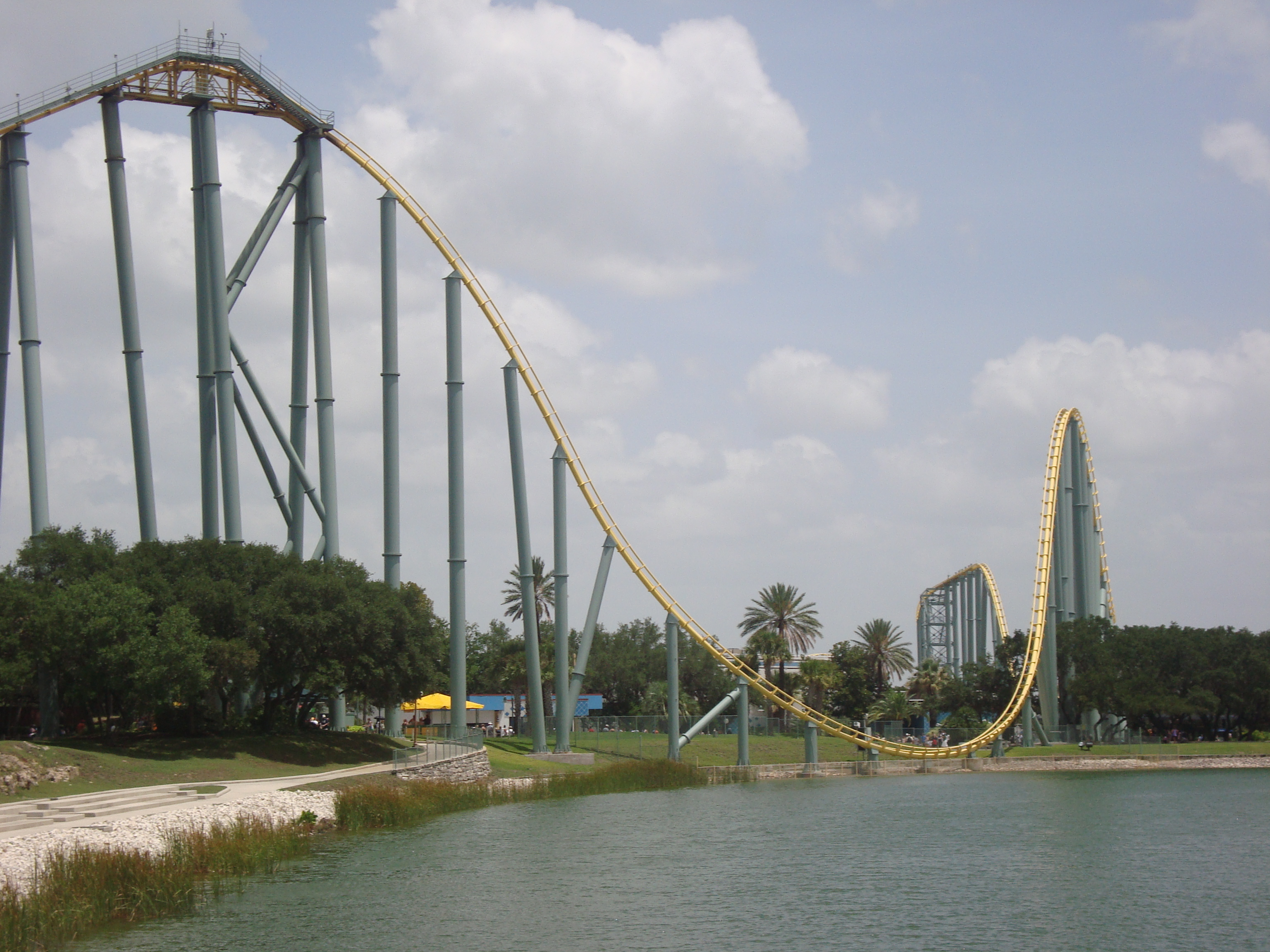
- Steel Eel's initial drop and several hills

SeaWorld San Antonio
- Location: SeaWorld San Antonio
- Coordinates: 29°27′19″N 98°41′46″W
- Status: Operating
- Opening date: March 6, 1999

General statistics
- Type: Steel
- Manufacturer: D. H. Morgan Manufacturing
- Lift/launch system: Chain lift hill
- Height: 150 ft (46 m)
- Drop: 150 ft (46 m)
- Length: 3,700 ft (1,100 m)
- Speed: 65 mph (105 km/h)
- Duration: 1:40
- Max vertical angle: 60°
- G-force: 3.5
- Trains: 2 trains with 6 cars; riders arranged 2 across in 3 rows for a total of 36 riders per train
- Steel Eel at RCDB

Steel Eel is a steel roller coaster located at SeaWorld San Antonio in San Antonio, Texas. Manufactured and designed by D. H. Morgan Manufacturing, the roller coaster opened on March 6, 1999, and was the single-biggest investment by the park at the time. The construction of Steel Eel was facilitated by rising guest interest in more attractions following the opening of a steel inverted roller coaster, The Great White.

Steel Eel reaches a maximum height of 150 feet (46 m), with a maximum speed of 65 miles per hour (105 km/h), and a total length of 3,700 feet (1,100 m). The roller coaster was the second to open at the park, mainly focusing on air time. Upon opening, the roller coaster received generally positive reviews from critics and guests, and received several awards.

== History ==
After building The Great White, a steel inverted roller coaster that opened in 1997, SeaWorld officials saw a great amount of optimistic feedback from guests, leading to the development of Steel Eel. The roller coaster was designed with the park's layout in mind and would interact with several of the park's existing attractions. Steel Eel's design focused on height and speed. Park officials had sought to increase the frequency of visitors with the opening of the roller coaster. The addition of the Steel Eel also sought to appeal to a wider-family demographic. SeaWorld San Antonio announced on August 18, 1998, that it would add a new steel roller coaster, named Steel Eel. The roller coaster was touted as a "hypercoaster", with a planned opening date set for March 1999.

The construction of Steel Eel was one of the many roller coasters announced by theme parks around the United States in a record high trend. Steel Eel was the most expensive single-season investment the park had made in a 10 year period. Testing rehearsals were finishing up in early March 1999. The roller coaster would open with the park on March 6.

== Ride experience ==
The train departs the station making a left U-turn and ascends the 150-foot (46 m) chain lift hill. Cresting the top, the train descends the first 150-foot (46 m) drop reaching its maximum speed of 65 miles per hour (105 km/h). At the bottom of the drop, the train passes the on-ride camera and curves slightly to the left, going over a camelback hill before descending 65 feet (20 m), and ascending into another one. The train plunges down a 113-foot (34 m) drop into a ravine at 62 miles per hour (100 km/h), then enters the mid-course brake run. Exiting the brake run, the train drops at a right banked 44-degree curve before ascending another hill. After dropping and turning slightly to the left, the train enters a series of four camelback hills. The train then traverses an s-curve into the final brake run before returning to the station. One cycle of the roller coaster takes around a minute and forty-seconds to complete.

== Characteristics ==
Steel Eel is a steel roller coaster designed and manufactured by D. H. Morgan Manufacturing. It was the company's fourth hypercoaster to be built, after Wild Thing at Valleyfair, Steel Force at Dorney Park & Wildwater Kingdom, and Mamba at Worlds of Fun. The general contractor of the roller coaster was Browning Construction. The second roller coaster to open at the park, Steel Eel was built in the southeast portion of the park near The Great White and three children's attractions. Steel Eel was one of five roller coasters to open at Texas theme parks in 1999. To differ from the park's other steel roller coaster, The Great White, Steel Eel was designed to feature many points of air time. Steel Eel was the first roller coaster built by D. H. Morgan Manufacturing to utilize tubular steel supports as opposed to the manufacturer's earlier use in steel grid frameworks.

The roller coaster has a total track length of 3,700 feet (1,100 m). The initial drop has a 60 degree vertical angle, with the roller coaster exerting 3.5 g-forces to its riders. Originally sporting a Yellow track and Dark Teal support color scheme, Steel Eel was repainted in 2019 to feature bright Violet supports and a new brighter hue of Yellow on the track. Steel Eel operates with two trains. Each of the two trains can accommodate 36 passengers, including six cars a train. Each car has three rows with two seats to a single row. Each seat features a lap bar restraint.

== Reception ==
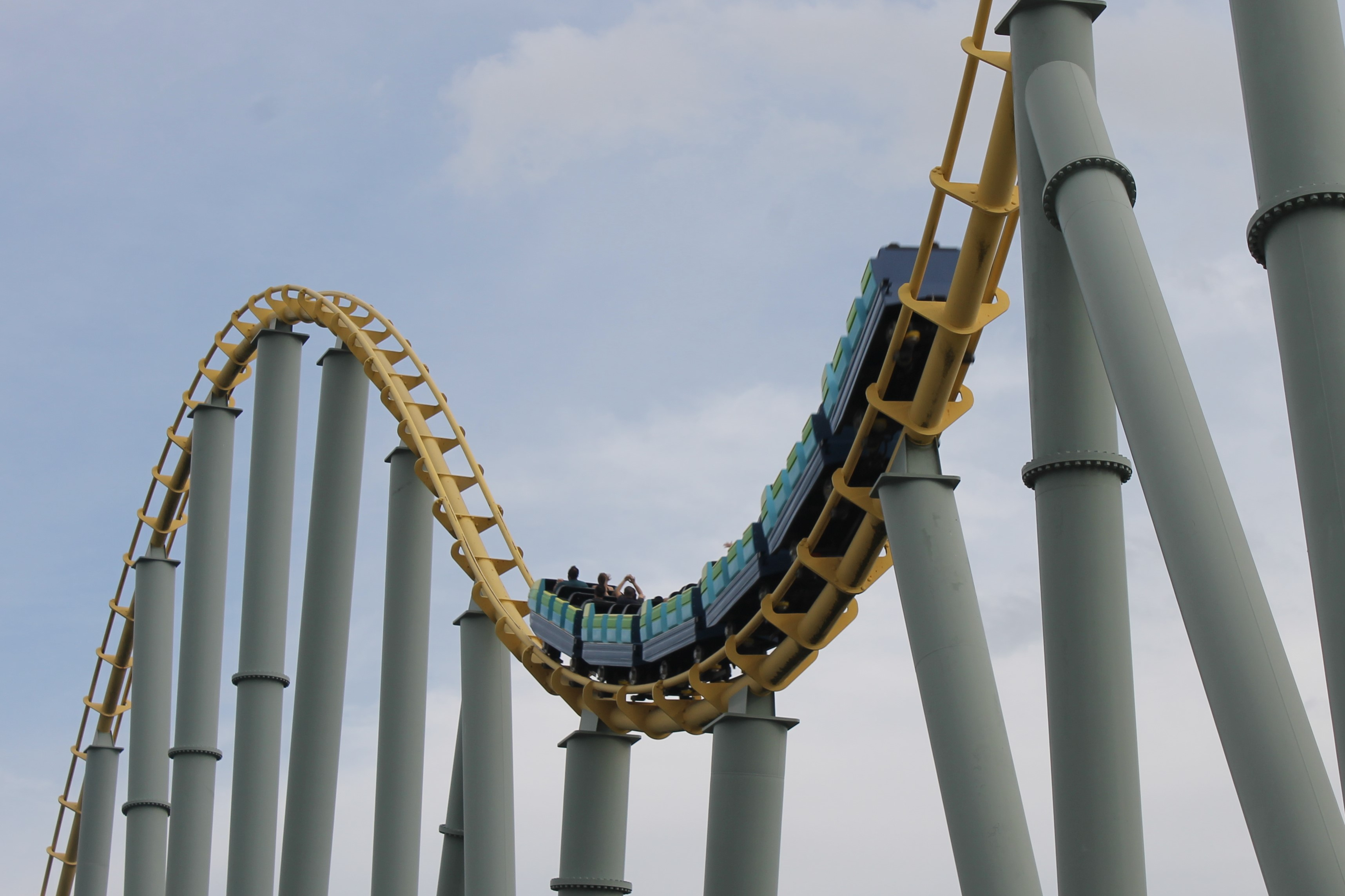
A train of Steel Eel traversing one of the camelback hills

Upon opening, the roller coaster received generally positive reviews from critics and guests. A report by Texas-based newspaper, The Monitor, recorded American Coaster Enthusiasts (ACE) reactions of the roller coaster, with one member stating it was simply "'smooth'", another stating it "'loads of fun'", and another stating it was "'incredible'". A consensus among ACE members thought the Steel Eel positively reinforced its steel inverted roller coaster counterpart in the park. John Morthland, writing for magazine Texas Monthly reviewing Texas roller coasters, commented that if roller coaster riders liked receiving their "thrills right side up", Steel Eel was the right fit.

=== Awards ===
A commercial produced by Busch Entertainment and GSD&M, Austin received the Brass Ring award in 1999 by the International Association of Amusement Parks and Attractions (IAAPA) for the park's Steel Eel roller coaster. Steel Eel has received several placements on Amusement Today's Golden Ticket Awards for being one of the top steel roller coasters.

Golden Ticket Awards: Top steel Roller Coasters
Year									1998	1999
Ranking									–	23
Year	2000	2001	2002	2003	2004	2005	2006	2007	2008	2009
Ranking	–	–	–	–	–	–	–	46	–	46
Year	2010	2011	2012	2013	2014	2015	2016	2017	2018	2019
Ranking	47	–	–	–	–	–	–	–	–	–
Year	2020	2021	2022	2023	2024	2025	2026			
Ranking	N/A	–	–	–	–	–	–			
