= Mike MacDonald (photographer) =

American photographer (born 1960)

- Born: 1960 (age 65–66)
- Known for: Photography
- Notable work: My Journey into the Wilds of Chicago
- Style: Immersive

Mike MacDonald (born 1960) is an American photographer, photojournalist, speaker, author and conservationist. MacDonald's photos, primarily featuring prairies, savannas and other natural habitats around the Chicago metropolitan area, are internationally published. MacDonald's photographic technique blends concepts from landscape and macro photography to create a three-dimensional, immersive effect in his work. In 2015, MacDonald authored the coffee-table book My Journey into the Wilds of Chicago.

== Chicago nature ==
MacDonald's work primarily focuses on the natural habitats of the Chicago area. In 2015, MacDonald authored the coffee-table book My Journey into the Wilds of Chicago: A Celebration of Chicagoland's Startling Natural Wonders, a collection built over two decades of more than 200 photographs and 30 profiles of Chicago area prairies, savannas, beaches and forests. Publishers Weekly called the book "celebratory, soulful and poetic," and its photos "glorious."

== Publications ==
- My Journey into the Wilds of Chicago, 2015, Morning Dew Press, ISBN 978-0-9963119-0-8, with forewords by Bill Kurtis and Stephen Packard
