= Wild Thing (Valleyfair) =

Roller coaster in Shakopee, Minnesota

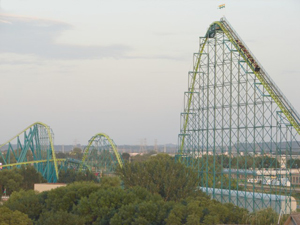
- Wild Thing above the trees

Valleyfair
- Location: Valleyfair
- Park section: South Midway
- Coordinates: 44°47′54.8″N 93°27′31.4″W
- Status: Operating
- Opening date: May 11, 1996
- Cost: $9,500,000 USD

General statistics
- Type: Steel
- Manufacturer: D. H. Morgan Manufacturing
- Designer: Steve Okamoto
- Model: Hypercoaster
- Track layout: Out and Back
- Lift/launch system: Chain-lift
- Height: 207 ft (63 m)
- Drop: 196 ft (60 m)
- Length: 5,460 ft (1,660 m)
- Speed: 75 mph (121 km/h)
- Inversions: 0
- Duration: 3:00
- Max vertical angle: 60°
- Capacity: 1,700 riders per hour
- G-force: 4.1
- Height restriction: 48 in (122 cm)
- Trains: 3 trains with 6 cars; riders arranged 2 across in 3 rows for a total of 36 riders per train
- Fast Lane available
- Wild Thing at RCDB

Wild Thing is a hypercoaster located at Valleyfair. It is an out and back roller coaster with more than one mile (1.6 km) of track. Its first hill is 207 feet (63 m) with a 60 degree drop, and the roller coaster reaches speeds of up to 74 mph (119 km/h). Wild Thing's height was set by the Federal Aviation Administration due to the nearby presence of Flying Cloud Airport.

Designed and manufactured by D. H. Morgan Manufacturing, it was the first hypercoaster to be built by the company, opening in 1996. It was the 5th tallest coaster in the world when it opened. The ride's success led to the construction of Steel Force at Dorney Park in Allentown, Pennsylvania in 1997 and Mamba at Worlds of Fun in Kansas City, Missouri the next year.

== History ==
After the success of Magnum XL-200 at Cedar Point, Valleyfair's parent company Cedar Fair planned a new roller coaster for Valleyfair's sister park Dorney Park & Wildwater Kingdom. However, Dorney Park could not secure the necessary permits for the ride, so Cedar Fair switched the recipient of the new coaster to Valleyfair. The move to Valleyfair was officially announced on August 25, 1995, revealing that it would be named Wild Thing. D. H. Morgan Manufacturing was hired to build the new hypercoaster, a roller coaster that exceeds 200 feet (61 m) in drop height or overall height. Wild Thing officially opened on May 11, 1996.

Following the successful opening of Wild Thing, Morgan would build a few more roller coasters, including Steel Force at Dorney Park & Wildwater Kingdom, Mamba at Worlds of Fun, Steel Eel at SeaWorld San Antonio, and Steel Dragon 2000 at Nagashima Spa Land.

== Ride experience ==
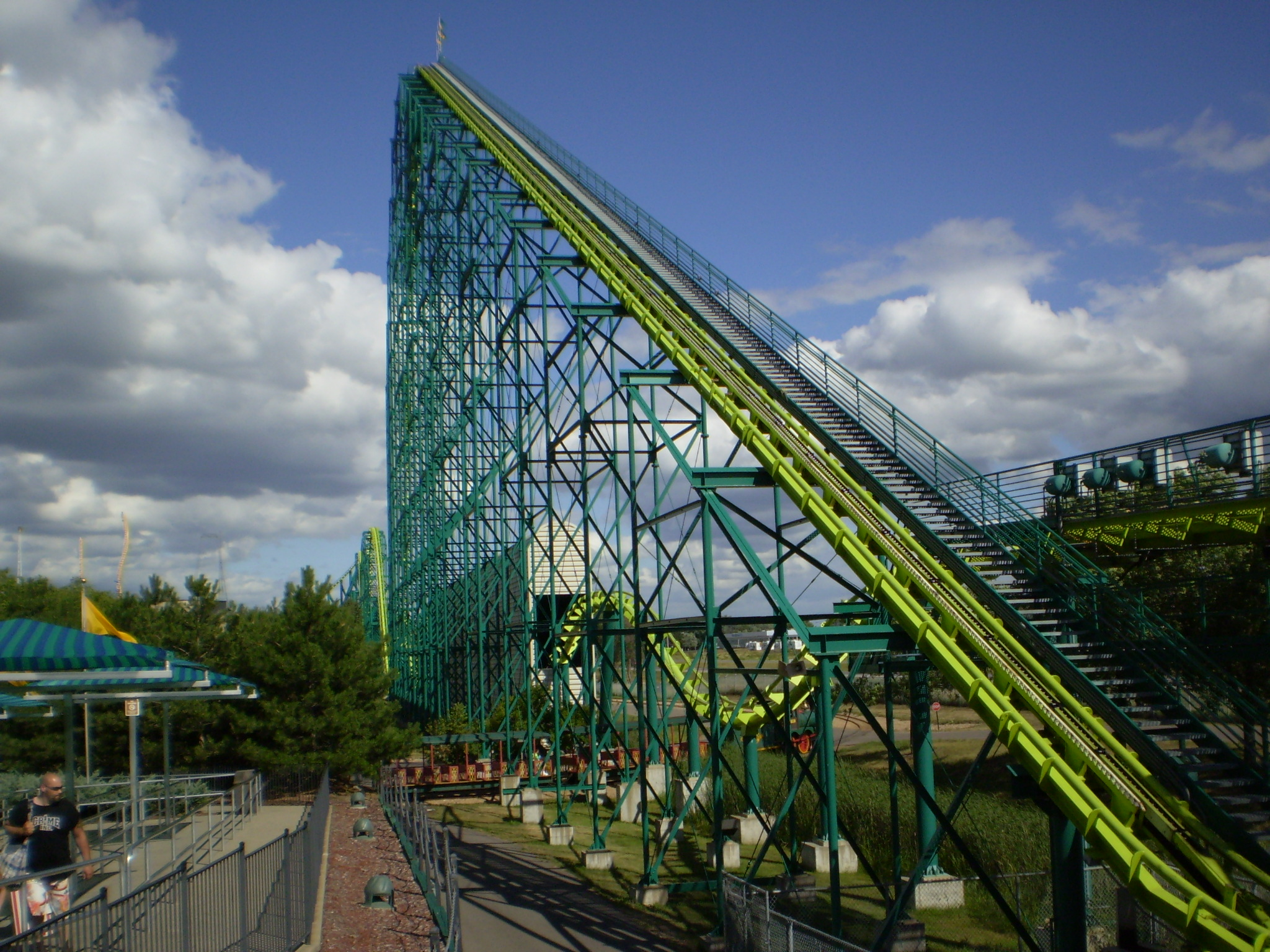
Wild Thing's lift hill

After the ascent to the top of the 207 ft (63.1 m) lift hill, the train plunges down the 196 ft (59.7 m) drop, reaching the maximum speed of 74 mph (119.1 km/h). The train then enters a 103 ft (31.4 m) parabolic hill, resulting in one of the longest low gravity sections of any coaster in the world. After the hill, the train climbs a larger 130 ft (39.6m) hill and turns left followed by a large figure-eight turnaround. The train then makes a s-turn into a mid-course brake run. followed by several airtime hills, two of which are inside a tunnel where riders are photographed via on-ride camera. The train is led into a final brake run followed by a right turn back into the station.

== Accidents ==
Several minor injuries occurred following a derailment on the Wild Thing on May 21, 2006, when a brake mount came loose. The accident happened in the mid brake, where a train waits to enter the station following a run. The failed brake mount struck the rear axle of the train's fifth car, causing the sixth car to detach from the train and de-rail on one side. 14 people were taken to St. Francis Regional Medical Center, but all were released the same day with minor or no injuries.

Contrary to widespread rumors, neither the train, the cars, or any of the riders fell from the track. All riders were wearing their required seat belts and lap bars, preventing them from being ejected from their car. The sixth car did not completely derail from the track, rather settling in a leaning position on its right side.

Wild Thing reopened on June 1, 2006, after being judged safe by inspectors.
