= My Journey into the Wilds of Chicago =

2015 book by Mike MacDonald

My Journey into the Wilds of Chicago: A Celebration of Chicagoland's Startling Natural Wonders
- Author: Mike MacDonald
- Illustrator: Mike MacDonald
- Language: English
- Genre: Coffee Table Book
- Publisher: Morning Dew Press
- Publication date: Dec. 21, 2015
- Publication place: United States
- Media type: Print
- Pages: 240 pp (first edition)
- ISBN: 978-0-9963119-0-8

My Journey into the Wilds of Chicago is a photo-literary coffee table book by Mike MacDonald, with forewords by Bill Kurtis and Stephen Packard. The book is a visual and educational journey through the prairies, savannas and other natural areas in the Chicago metropolitan area.

The book contains more than 200 photographs and nearly two dozen essays and poems written by MacDonald about Chicago's wild side, ranging geographically from the lakefront to prairie lands just north of the border in Wisconsin, to Kankakee, Lockport, Batavia and McHenry County.

My Journey into the Wilds of Chicago was the basis for the website Chicago Nature Now!, run by MacDonald. The website is a digital catalog of Chicago's forest preserves and provides updates of the area's natural events.

== Reception ==
The book was positively received, including a review from Publishers Weekly which said, "This impressive, cloth-bound debut is a lucid perspective on the prairie and its native plants and animals; it is celebratory, soulful and poetic, evoking a strong affection for Chicago's unchecked wilderness in a city best known for its iconic lakefront and skyscrapers."
