= Wild Things (2010 TV series) =

- Created by: Smocko Productions / Stanford Productions
- Directed by: Jeremy Stanford
- Starring: Maria Roman / Tiara Russell / Cassandra Cass
- Country of origin: United States
- No. of seasons: 1
- No. of episodes: 8

Production
- Running time: 25 minutes

Original release
- Release: March 22, 2010

Related
- Trantasia

Wild Things is an eight-episode reality television series which features three transgender women on a fundraising road-trip to earn money for a relative with a life-threatening disease. The series stars Maria Roman, Tiara Russell and Cassandra Cass. The three women were first featured together in the documentary film Trantasia, which chronicled contestants in the first ever 'World's Most Beautiful Transsexual Pageant'. Wild Things reunites the three transgender women as they visit small towns in the United States and work in traditionally macho jobs to earn cash to assist Maria's brother, who is struggling with a critical illness. The series premiered on Canadian television on The Movie Network and Movie Central on March 22, 2010. The series has also been featured on Entertainment Tonight Canada.

== Episodes ==
- EPISODE# 101 BULL-RIDING RANCH-HANDS (Ranch Part 1): “Do you ride it bareback?”
- EPISODE# 102 COWGIRLS GONE WILD (Ranch Part 2): “Nothing to fear, but fear itself”
- EPISODE# 103 FISHING FOR HOTDOGS: “We didn’t trick you… We just sold you a hot dog!”
- EPISODE# 104 BOXING KNOCKOUTS: “Madness! Mayhem! Shenanigans!”
- EPISODE# 105 GRAPES OF WRATH: “Girl, you just made jam with one foot!”
- EPISODE# 106 SLAUGHTERHOUSE THREE: “You gotta kill the cow before you grill the cow!”
- EPISODE# 107 ATV... OMG! “Girls, are you ready to ride?”
- EPISODE# 108 SECURITY! "Parting shots"
