= D. H. Morgan Manufacturing =

Amusement attraction manufacturer

- Type: Private
- Industry: Amusement ride manufacturing
- Founded: 1983
- Defunct: June 14, 2001
- Fate: Acquisition
- Successor: Chance Morgan
- Headquarters: La Selva Beach, California
- Key people: Dana H. Morgan, Paula Morgan
- Products: Roller coasters, Carousels, thrill rides, family rides, gentle rides

D. H. Morgan Manufacturing, later simply known as Morgan, was a manufacturer of roller coaster trains, custom amusement rides, roller coasters, children's rides and other amusement devices. Founded in 1983, the company was originally headquartered in Scotts Valley, California. In 1991, the company moved to La Selva Beach, California, and into a new 55,000-square-foot indoor manufacturing facility. That facility was later increased to 75,000 square feet. The company produced a variety of rides from 1983 until 2001, but is probably best known for its steel hyper coasters.

== History ==
Dana Morgan, the son of Arrow Development co-founder Ed Morgan, founded D. H. Morgan Manufacturing in 1983. He got his start in the amusement industry at age 14 as a ride operator at Playtown, a small children's park in Palo Alto, California, that was owned by Arrow Development. Upon graduation from Cal Poly San Luis Obispo he went to work for Disney, primarily doing design work for the Walt Disney World project. During the construction of Disney World, Morgan went to work for Arrow Development which was building rides for Disney World. In 1974 Morgan left Arrow Development to become the general manager of the Santa Cruz Beach Boardwalk. When Huss Maschinenfabrik purchased Arrow Development in 1981, Morgan was appointed president of the newly formed Arrow-Huss. Morgan left Arrow-Huss in 1983 to form his own company, D. H. Morgan Manufacturing. Morgan had originally intended to build carousels, but the company's first contract was to build new trains for the Giant Dipper wooden roller coaster at the Santa Cruz Beach Boardwalk. The demand for new coaster vehicles was so great that the carousel-building business had to be put on hold until 1988. In the meantime, the Electric Antique Car Line was developed, and customer requests came in for custom attractions as well. In March 1991, the company moved to larger facilities in La Selva Beach, California. Dana Morgan continued building trains for wooden coasters until 1994 when on June 8, he sold the wood train manufacturing operation to competitor Philadelphia Toboggan Coasters. The last Morgan trains built for a wooden coaster were delivered to Yomiuriland in Japan.

In 1995 Morgan built a Mine Train type ride for Michael Bonfante for what was then called Hecker Pass — A Family Adventure in Gilroy, California. The coaster, Quicksilver Express, was manufactured in 1995 but sat at the Morgan Manufacturing facility for five years before it was finally installed in 2000. Bonfante Gardens opened to the public a year later in 2001. In 1995, Richard Kinzel of Cedar Fair asked Morgan to build a 200-foot hypercoaster for Valleyfair in Minnesota. Utilizing designer Steve Okamoto, whom he had worked with at Arrow Dynamics, Morgan opened Wild Thing in 1996. Morgan went on to build seven more steel coasters, including two more for Cedar Fair. D. H. Morgan Manufacturing also redesigned the former Arrow Coaster Steel Phantom at Kennywood Park in Pennsylvania.

Dana Morgan retired from the amusement industry in 2001 and sold the assets of his company on June 14, 2001 to Michael Chance, who was the sales representative for competitor Chance Industries, Inc.

== List of roller coasters ==
As of 2019, D. H. Morgan Manufacturing has built 9 roller coasters around the world.

Name	Model	Park	Country	Opened	Status	Ref
Phantom's Revenge; Formerly Steel Phantom	Hyper Coaster	Kennywood	United States	2001	Operating	
Wild Thing	Hyper Coaster	Valleyfair	United States	1996	Operating	
Santa Monica West Coaster	Mini Coaster	Pacific Park	United States	1996	Operating	
Steel Force	Hyper Coaster	Dorney Park	United States	1997	Operating	
Mamba	Hyper Coaster	Worlds of Fun	United States	1998	Operating	
Steel Eel	Hyper Coaster	SeaWorld San Antonio	United States	1999	Operating	
Steel Dragon 2000	Hyper Coaster	Nagashima Spa Land	Japan	2000	Operating	
Quicksilver Express	Mine Train Coaster	Gilroy Gardens	United States	2001	Operating	
Superman el Último Escape	Hyper Coaster	Six Flags Mexico	Mexico	2004	Operating	

== Wooden roller coaster trains ==
Opened	Name	Park	Notes	Ref
1983	Giant Dipper	Santa Cruz Beach Boardwalk		
1985/86	Le Monstre	La Ronde	Replaced by PTC trains in 2013	
1985	Cyclone	Six Flags New England	Replaced by PTC trains in 2000	
1986	The Grizzly	California's Great America		
1987	Texas Cyclone	AstroWorld	Closed 2005, demolished March 2006, trains moved to La Ronde	
1987	Colossus	Six Flags Magic Mountain	Coaster converted to Twisted Colossus running RMC trains	
1989	Anaconda	Walygator Parc		
1988	Dragon Coaster	Playland (New York)		
1989	Jack Rabbit	Seabreeze Amusement Park		
1989	Giant Dipper	Belmont Park (San Diego)		
1992	The Rattler	Six Flags Fiesta Texas	replaced by PTC trains in 1996	
1994	White Canyon	Yomiuriland	Coaster closed in 2013	

== Steel roller coasters trains ==
Opened	Name	Park	Notes	Ref
1987	Polar Coaster	Story Land	Hopkins Rides coaster with train supplied by D. H. Morgan Manufacturing.	

== Carousels ==
Opened	Venue	Location	Size	Notes	Ref
1989	Town Center Mall	Thornton, Co.	30 foot	Menagerie carousel (may have been removed from mall)	
1989	Belmont Park	San Diego, Calif.	30 foot	Liberty themed with 12 custom paintings of San Diego's history. Features replicas of Looff and Dentzel menagerie characters	
1990	Vallco Fashion Park	Cupertino, Calif.	30 foot	North American wildlife theme (may have been removed from mall)	
1991	Playland Park	Vancouver, B.C.	30 foot	Restoration of Arrow Dynamics Carousel. 12 hand painted scenes of B.C. Landscape	
1992	Fiesta Texas	San Antonio, Tex.	47 foot	German themed, 16 scenes of Germany countryside	
1993	Entertainment City	Kuwait	47 foot	Arabian horse themed, 56 custom Arabian horses	
1996	Carousel Park, Broadway at the Beach	Myrtle Beach, South Carolina.		Restoration of Allan Herschell carousel. New fiberglass horses	
1999	Islands of Adventure	Orlando, Fla.	47 foot	Dr. Seuss themed, 54 animals from classic Dr. Seuss stories	
2001	Disney's California Adventure	Anaheim, Calif.	47 foot	King Triton themed (Now Jessie themed), 56 sea creatures and multiple icons of Calif. historic seaside parks and as of 2019, Toy Story 2 animals	

== Electric guide-limited auto rides ==
Morgan produced two styles of cars: Classic Antique cars with two or four-passenger vehicles, and 1950s-themed cars with a working radio that played classic 1950s tunes.

Opened	Park	Notes	Ref
1985	Santa Cruz Beach Boardwalk	Antique style cars (removed 1999)	
1986	Lake Compounce	Antique style cars	
1987	Kennywood	Antique style cars (removed 2009, currently in storage)	
1987	Six Flags Magic Mountain	Antique style cars (removed 2008)	
1992	Fiesta Texas	Dual track, 1950s style cars with radio — '56 T-bird, '57 Vette, '59 Caddy (closed August 2014)	
1995	Dollywood	Dual track, 1950s style cars with radio — '56 T-bird, '57 Vette, '59 Caddy	
2001	Bonfante Gardens	1950s style cars with radio — '57 Chevy, '57 Vette, '59 Caddy	
2001	Bonfante Gardens	Antique style cars — 1900s Mercer Raceabouts	
2002	Michigan's Adventure	Dual track, 1950s style cars with radio — '56 T-bird, '57 Vette, '59 Caddy (removed 2020)	

== Miscellaneous projects ==
Opened	Ride	Park	Notes	Ref
1988	Train crash mechanism	Universal Studios Hollywood		
1988	Children's Boat Ride	Lotte World	Under water track and drive system	
1988	Children's Chariot	Lotte World		
1990	Tour boat ride	Haw Park Villa, Singapore	16-passenger boats themed as 100-year-old Chinese junks	
1992	8 Ball Ride	Fiesta Texas	Teacup-style ride, named Hustler.	
1992	Dark Ride Transport System	Kings Island	Originally for Phantom Theater, later re-used for Scooby-Doo and the Haunted Castle and Boo Blasters on Boo Hill	
1992	Teddy Bear Ferris Wheel	Lotte World	Highly themed with teddy bears holding candy canes	
1992	Balloon Ride	Knott's Berry Farm		
1993	Outrigger Canoes	Leofoo Village Theme Park	300-foot underwater track and drive system	
1996	Delta boat ride	Opryland Hotel	20-passenger ADA accessible battery-powered boats	
1999	Fairy Tale Brook	Legoland California	4-passenger rail-guided boats themed to look like floating leaves.	
2001	Garlic Clove Ride	Bonfante Gardens	Teacup-style ride, named Garlic Twist.	
2001	Balloon Ride	Bonfante Gardens		
2001	Children's Hand Car Ride	Bonfante Gardens		
2001	Custom Monorail	Bonfante Gardens		
2001	Circular Boat Ride	Bonfante Gardens		
2001	Artichoke Ride	Bonfante Gardens		
2001	Strawberry Ride	Bonfante Gardens		
