= Big Dipper (Blackpool Pleasure Beach) =

Wooden roller coaster at Pleasure Beach Resort

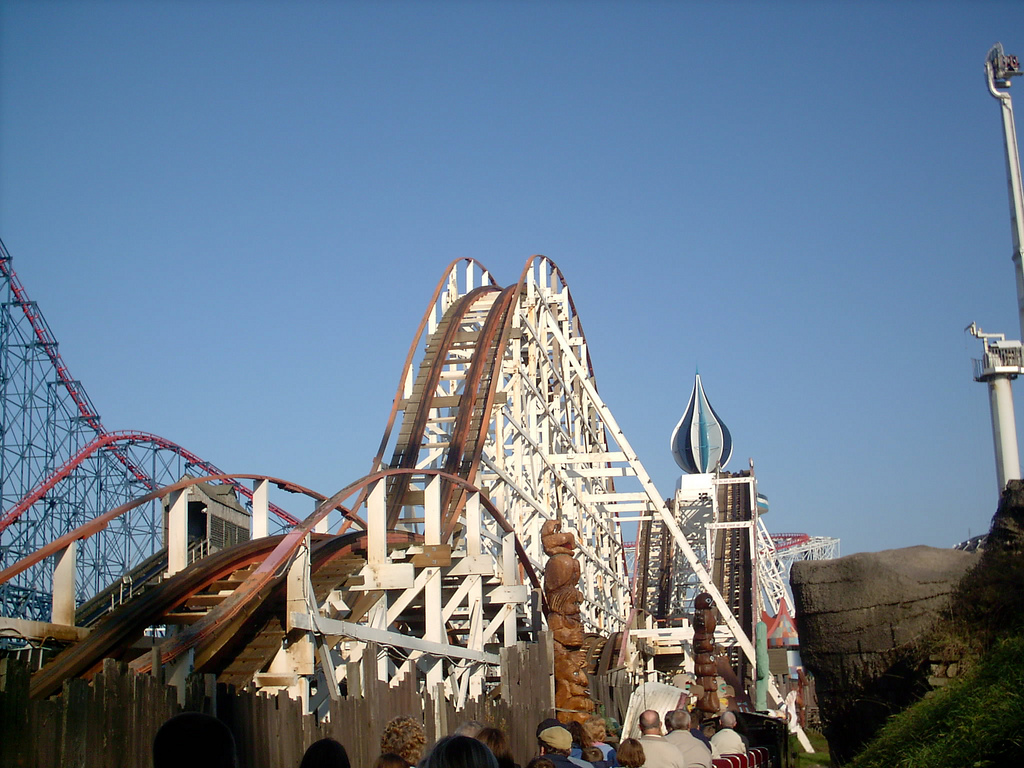
- Big Dipper

Pleasure Beach Resort
- Location: Pleasure Beach Resort
- Coordinates: 53°47′21″N 3°03′25″W
- Status: Closed
- Opening date: 23 August 1923; 102 years ago
- Cost: £25,000 (1922)

General statistics
- Type: Wood – Out-and-back
- Manufacturer: William Strickler
- Designer: John A. Miller
- Track layout: Out-and-back
- Lift/launch system: 2 chain lift hills
- Height: 65 ft (20 m)
- Drop: 50 ft (15 m)
- Length: 3,300 ft (1,000 m)
- Speed: 40 mph (64 km/h)
- Inversions: 0
- Duration: 2:28
- Max vertical angle: 46°
- G-force: 3.7
- Height restriction: 46 in (117 cm)
- Trains: 2 trains with 3 cars; riders arranged 2 across in 4 rows for a total of 24 riders per train
- Big Dipper at RCDB

Big Dipper is a wooden out-and-back roller coaster at Pleasure Beach Resort (better known as Blackpool Pleasure Beach) in Blackpool, England. Originally built in 1923, its layout was extended in 1936. It was designated as a Grade II listed building on 19 April 2017. It is the oldest operating roller coaster in the United Kingdom after the closure of Scenic Railway in 2026.

== History ==
=== Construction and expansion ===
The coaster was designed by John A. Miller, and opened on 23 August 1923. It is located in the southwestern portion of the park. It was extended in 1936 with arches over the south entrance of the park and additional drops by American engineer Charles Paige (whose work at Pleasure Beach Resort is all that survives of the 13 wooden coasters he is known to have built). British architect Joseph Emberton designed the ride's station.

=== Refurbishment ===
On 13 February 2010, Big Dipper reopened after months of refurbishment following an incident in August 2009. The station was upgraded during this period of time: retracking was completed, a decorative water fountain was added, and the trains were repaired and repainted dark blue with new decorative decals on their sides. The handrails were replaced in 2014.

== Characteristics ==
=== Manufacturer ===
Big Dipper was designed by John A. Miller at Krug Park in Nebraska in 1918, and built by William H. Strickler. It cost £25,000 to construct.

=== Trains ===
The ride's trains were built by Philadelphia Toboggan Coasters. It operates with two trains, each containing three four-row cars, seating two people per row, for a total of 24 riders per train. Each row features a single lap bar which restrains all riders in the row.

=== Track ===
The track is 1,005.8 metres (3,300 ft) long and the lift hill is approximately 19.8 metres (65 ft) high, with a first drop of 15 metres (50 ft). It has a maximum vertical angle of 46 degrees, and subjects riders to a maximum of 3.7 Gs. It runs north-to-south. Big Dipper was the first coaster in England to feature upstop wheels, allowing for a steeper and faster experience. The ride has top speeds of 64 km/h (40 mph). One cycle of the ride takes approximately 2 minutes and 30 seconds.

== Incidents ==
- On 26 June 1975, part of the main lift hill and first drop were severely damaged by a fire. The ride was subsequently repaired.
- On 11 August 2009, two trains carrying a total of 32 guests collided. 21 riders required hospital treatment for injuries ranging from whiplash and broken noses to cuts and bruises.
- On 5 June 2010, a train partially derailed. There were no injuries reported, and the ride resumed operations a short time later.
- On 23 July 2026, a full train of riders partially derailed, causing significant damage to a section of track. There were no injuries reported, and the ride has since been closed pending investigation and repairs.

== Records ==
In August 1998, Richard Rodriguez set a world record by riding Big Dipper for over 1,000 hours. There is a plaque commemorating this event in the ride's station. Although he doubled this mark two years later to 2,000 hours, Guinness World Records nullified the achievements by altering the rules in 2007, and Rodriguez instead set a new record on Big One.

== In popular culture ==
- Big Dipper is referenced in the Jethro Tull song "Big Dipper", a track from the 1976 album Too Old to Rock 'n' Roll: Too Young to Die!.
- In the 1964 episode "Dangerous Journey" of the second season of Doctor Who, where the crew of the TARDIS had been shrunken to the size of ants, the character Barbara says that a tumultuous journey inside of a briefcase was "worse than the Big Dipper".

== Gallery ==
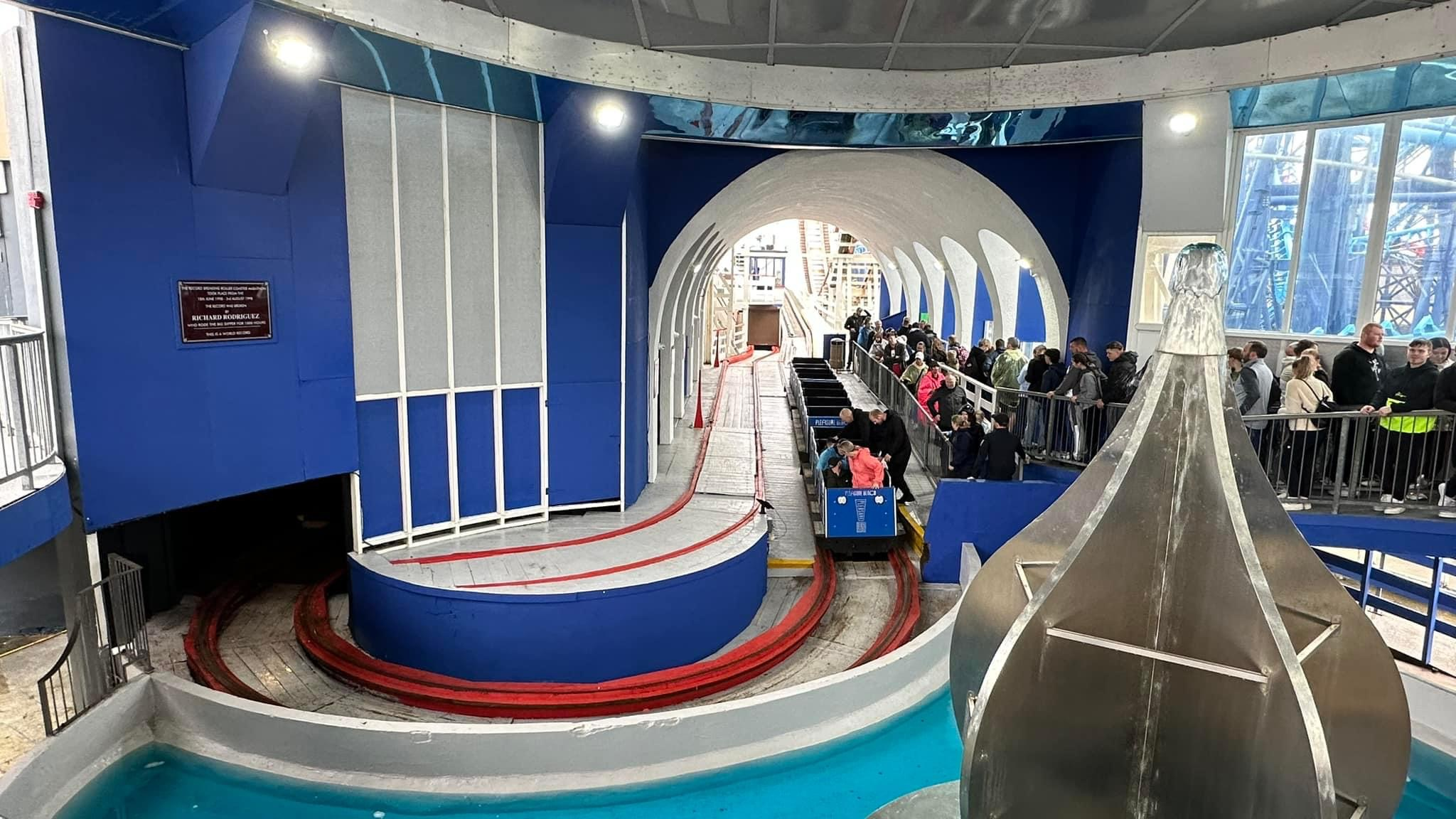
Station

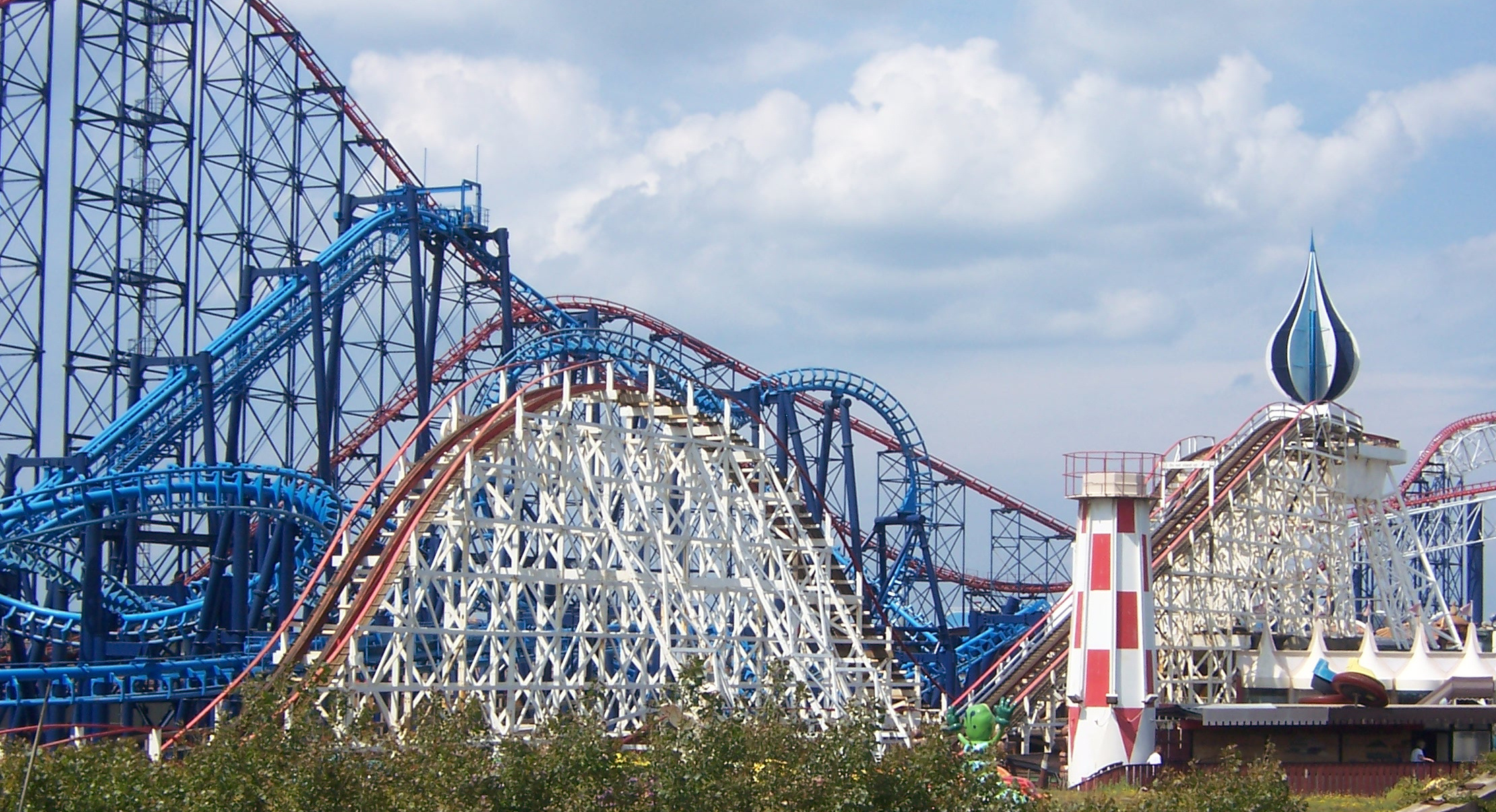
View of Big Dipper with Infusion and Big One in the background

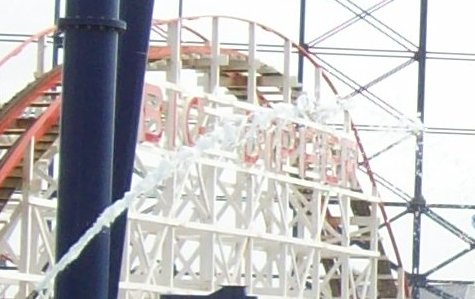
Big Dipper sign

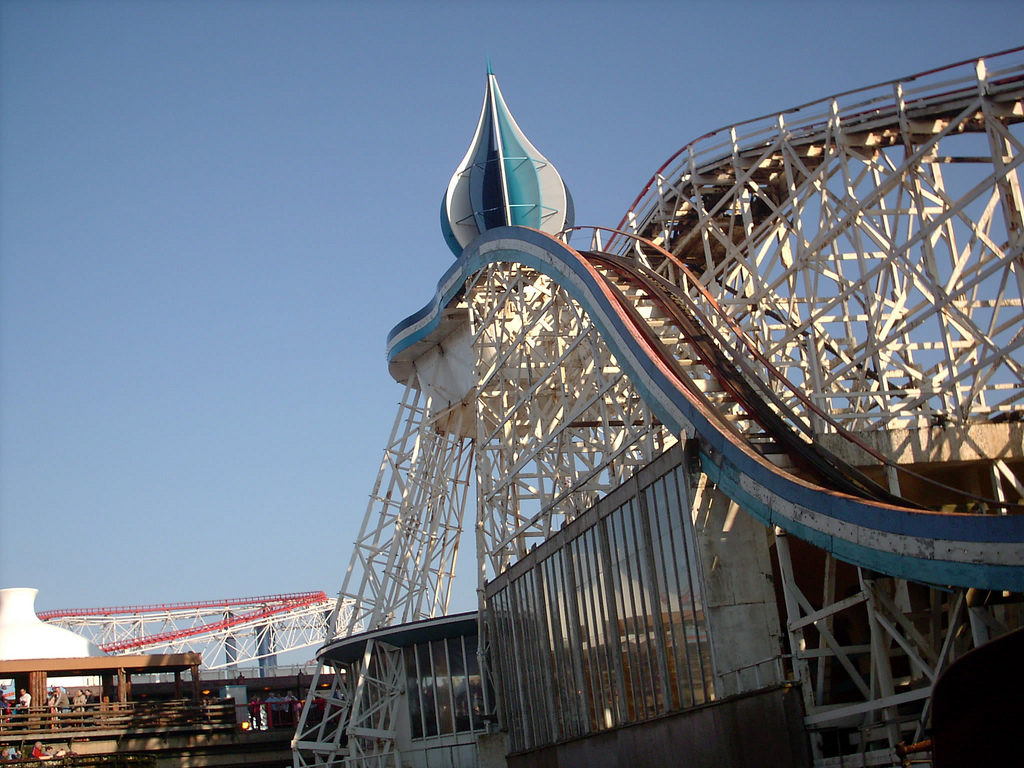
First drop

== See also ==
- Listed buildings in Blackpool
