= Cassandra Cass =

American actress and performer

- Born: Des Moines, Iowa, U.S.

Cassandra Cass (born 1977/1978) is an American actress and performer and reality-television star.

== Early life and transition ==
She was born in Des Moines, Iowa to a housewife and a football coach. Her father initially had difficulty in processing her coming out as trans, but eventually came to accept it; her mother was always supportive of her daughter's trans identity. Her father is still alive, but her mother died from lung cancer. At some point in her early life, she came to realize she would be more comfortable and happy living as a woman.

Cass started socially transitioning and presenting as a woman through clothing, hair, and make-up. After researching different pathways and with the advice of medical professionals, she later made the decision to start hormone therapy and have plastic surgery.

After moving to San Francisco, she underwent gender affirmation. Cassandra is a name she chose from several sources. Her mother's name was Sandra, her given name was Casey, and her drag mother's name (when she was in drag performance) was Dena Cass. So she just combined all three to get Cassandra Cass.

She is known for being a trans woman, and finds that performing in the entertainment world gives validation to her feminine life.

== Career ==
As an actress, Cass is known for Trantasia (2006), Wild Things (2010), and What's the T? (2012). Trantasia is a documentary that chronicles contestants as they take part in the first ever "World's Most Beautiful Transsexual Pageant." The documentary was featured on Tyra Banks's show, dedicating a whole show to talking about it. Wild Things was an eight-episode reality television series which featured three transgender women on a road-trip to earn money for a relative of one of the three women who was seriously ill. The reality show starred Cassandra Cass, Maria Roman, and Tiara Russell, three original characters from Trantasia. The documentary What's the T? followed the lives of five trans women. Cass has also been on television shows and in other films.

She is also a drag performer in San Francisco.
