= Stephen Packard =

American conservationist

- Born: April 1943 (age 83)
- Education: Harvard University
- Employer(s): The Nature Conservancy, Audubon, Northwestern University

Stephen Packard (born 1943) is an American conservationist, author, and ecological restoration practitioner active in the Chicago area.

Packard began his career in restoration ecology in 1977 as a volunteer with the "North Branch Prairie Project" in Cook County, Illinois. The project is now known as the North Branch Restoration Project. In 1978, he became a field representative for the Illinois chapter of The Nature Conservancy (TNC-Illinois). From 1983-1999, he was the Director of Science and Stewardship for TNC-Illinois. Packard founded the Audubon Chicago Region chapter in 1999 and worked for this organization until 2014. The chapter has since expanded to encompass the Great Lakes region and is now known as Audubon Great Lakes. Between 2008 and 2013 he taught "Science and Policy of Ecological Conservation" at Northwestern University.

Stephen Packard is a founding member/contributor to Society for Ecological Restoration, TNC's Volunteer Stewardship Network, Chicago Wilderness and its "Mighty Acorns" program, Friends of the Forest Preserves, and the Wild Things conference. He sits on the national advisory board for Wild Ones.

He serves as a volunteer land steward for the Forest Preserves of Cook County's Somme Prairie Grove.

== Publications ==
- Packard, Steve (1988). "Chronicles of Restoration: Just a Few Oddball Species: Restoration and the Rediscovery of the Tallgrass Savanna". Restoration & Management Notes. 6 (1): 13–22. JSTOR 43439280.
- Packard, Stephen; Mutel, Cornelia F., eds. (1997). The Tallgrass Restoration Handbook: For Prairies, Savannas, and Woodlands. Island Press.
- Freyman, William A.; Masters, Linda A.; Packard, Stephen (March 2016). "The Universal Floristic Quality Assessment (FQA) Calculator: an online tool for ecological assessment and monitoring". Methods in Ecology and Evolution. 7 (3): 380–383. Bibcode:2016MEcEv...7..380F. doi:10.1111/2041-210X.12491.
