= Where the Wild Things Are (disambiguation) =

Where the Wild Things Are is a 1963 children's book by Maurice Sendak.

Where the Wild Things Are may also refer to:

== Adaptations of Sendak's book ==
- Where the Wild Things Are (opera), a 1980 opera by Oliver Knussen
- Where the Wild Things Are (film), a 2009 film directed by Spike Jonze
- Where the Wild Things Are (video game), a 2009 game adapted from the film

== Music ==
=== Albums ===
- Where the Wild Things Are (Agent Provocateur album), 1997
- Where the Wild Things Are (Blackout Records album), a compilation of New York hardcore bands, 1989
- Where the Wild Things Are (soundtrack), 2009
- Where the Wild Things Are, by Fang, 1983
- Where the Wild Things Are, by Steve Vai, 2009

=== Songs ===
- "Where the Wild Things Are" (song), by Luke Combs, 2023
- "Where the Wild Things Are", by Bryce Vine, 2013
- "Where the Wild Things Are", by Metallica from ReLoad, 1997
- "Where the Wild Things Are", by Zeds Dead and Illenium, 2017
- "Where the Wild Thing Are (Monsters)", by Anarbor from Free Your Mind, 2009
- "Where the Wild Things", by Labrinth from Imagination & the Misfit Kid, 2019

== Television episodes ==
- "Where the Wild Things Are" (Buffy the Vampire Slayer), 2000
- "Where the Wild Things Are" (Grey's Anatomy), 2008
