= Wild Things (organization) =

Wild Things community
- Founded: 2005
- Type: Non-governmental organization
- Purpose: conservation, environmental education, sustainability
- Location: Chicago Wilderness
- Website: www.wildthingscommunity.org

Wild Things is a nature conservation community based in northern Illinois that organizes one of the largest nature conservation conferences in the United States. While a variety of organizations have helped out as fiscal agents, decisions are made by the volunteer "Steering Committees" that organize the conference. As of 2023 the conference has been hosted by Friends of Illinois Nature Preserves.

== The Wild Things conference ==
Every two years, the Wild Things conference assembles a massive meeting of nature-lovers from all walks of life. The first of these conferences was in 1975. They have been convened under a series of names that changed in 2005 to "Wild Things: a Chicago Wilderness conference for People and Nature". The event includes workshops, seminars, and presentations on topics such as: nature conservation, ecological restoration and land management, flora and fauna, ecological monitoring, climate change, advocacy and communication, arts and culture, history, education, and volunteer engagement and community-building.

Art exhibitions, poster sessions, book sales, and a variety of exhibitors are also part of the conference.
