= Mamba (roller coaster) =

Roller coaster at Worlds of Fun

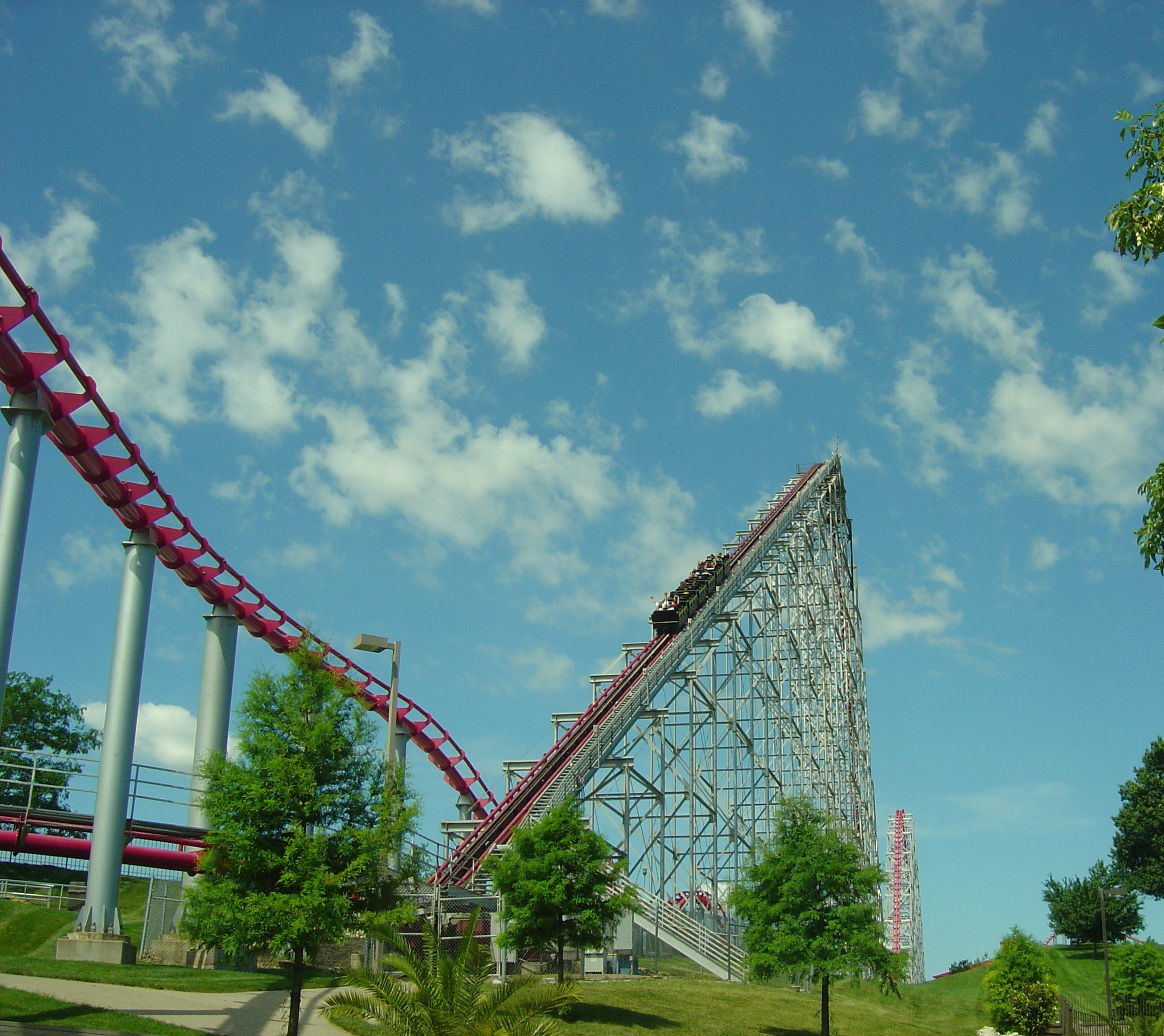
- Mamba's lift hill

Worlds of Fun
- Location: Worlds of Fun
- Park section: Africa
- Coordinates: 39.171979°N 94.490561°W
- Status: Operating
- Opening date: April 18, 1998
- Cost: Over $10 million

General statistics
- Type: Steel
- Manufacturer: D. H. Morgan Manufacturing
- Designer: Steve Okamoto
- Model: Hypercoaster
- Track layout: Out and Back
- Lift/launch system: Chain lift hill
- Height: 205 ft (62 m)
- Drop: 205 ft (62 m)
- Length: 5,600 ft (1,700 m)
- Speed: 75 mph (121 km/h)
- Inversions: 0
- Duration: 3:00
- Max vertical angle: 66°
- Capacity: 1700 riders per hour
- G-force: 3.5
- Height restriction: 48 in (122 cm)
- Trains: 3 trains with 6 cars; riders arranged 2 across in 3 rows for a total of 36 riders per train
- Fast Lane available
- Mamba at RCDB

Mamba is a steel roller coaster located at Worlds of Fun in Kansas City, Missouri. Designed by Steve Okamoto and manufactured by D.H. Morgan Manufacturing, Mamba opened to the public on April 18, 1998. It is classified as a hypercoaster, which is any coaster that exceeds 200 feet (61 m) in height or drop length, and cost over $10 million to construct. As of 2026, Mamba is tied with Steel Force at Dorney Park & Wildwater Kingdom in Allentown, Pennsylvania as the ninth longest steel coaster in the world. It is also currently the tallest, fastest, and longest continuous circuit coaster in the state of Missouri; it is surpassed in height only by Mr. Freeze: Reverse Blast at Mid-America Adventure, which is a Shuttle roller coaster.

== History ==
On September 11, 1997, Worlds of Fun announced that Mamba would be added to the park. The ride would be a hypercoaster by D.H. Morgan Manufacturing. It would be the tallest ride in the park at 205 feet (62 m). The coaster would be located in the Africa section of the park. Mamba officially opened on April 18, 1998.

Mamba's track was repainted in late 2024, changing its color from red to green.

In October 2025, the Missouri Division of Fire Safety conducted a spot inspection of the Mamba following public complaints and media reports regarding seat belt malfunctions. The investigation focused on an October 11 incident where passengers physically restrained another passenger after her seat belt unlatched and a similar report on October 12. Inspectors identified 18 worn buckles that were "not functioning properly", which the park replaced. The ride reopened on October 30 after the park confirmed the repairs, while emphasizing that the primary lap bar restraints had remained fully functional and the seat belts serve as a redundant safety system.

== Ride elements ==
- 205 foot 1st hill
- 184 foot 2nd hill
- 580° helix
- 5 consecutive camelback hills

== Trains ==
3 trains with 6 cars per train. Riders are arranged 2 across in 3 rows, for a total of 36 riders per train.

== Rankings ==
Golden Ticket Awards: Top Steel Roller Coasters
Year									1998	1999
Ranking									7	9
Year	2000	2001	2002	2003	2004	2005	2006	2007	2008	2009
Ranking	20	18	24	31	28	25	26	39	40	30
Year	2010	2011	2012	2013	2014	2015	2016	2017	2018	2019
Ranking	38	50	–	–	–	–	–	–	–	–
Year	2020	2021	2022	2023	2024	2025	2026			
Ranking	N/A	–	–	–	–	–	–			

== Gallery ==
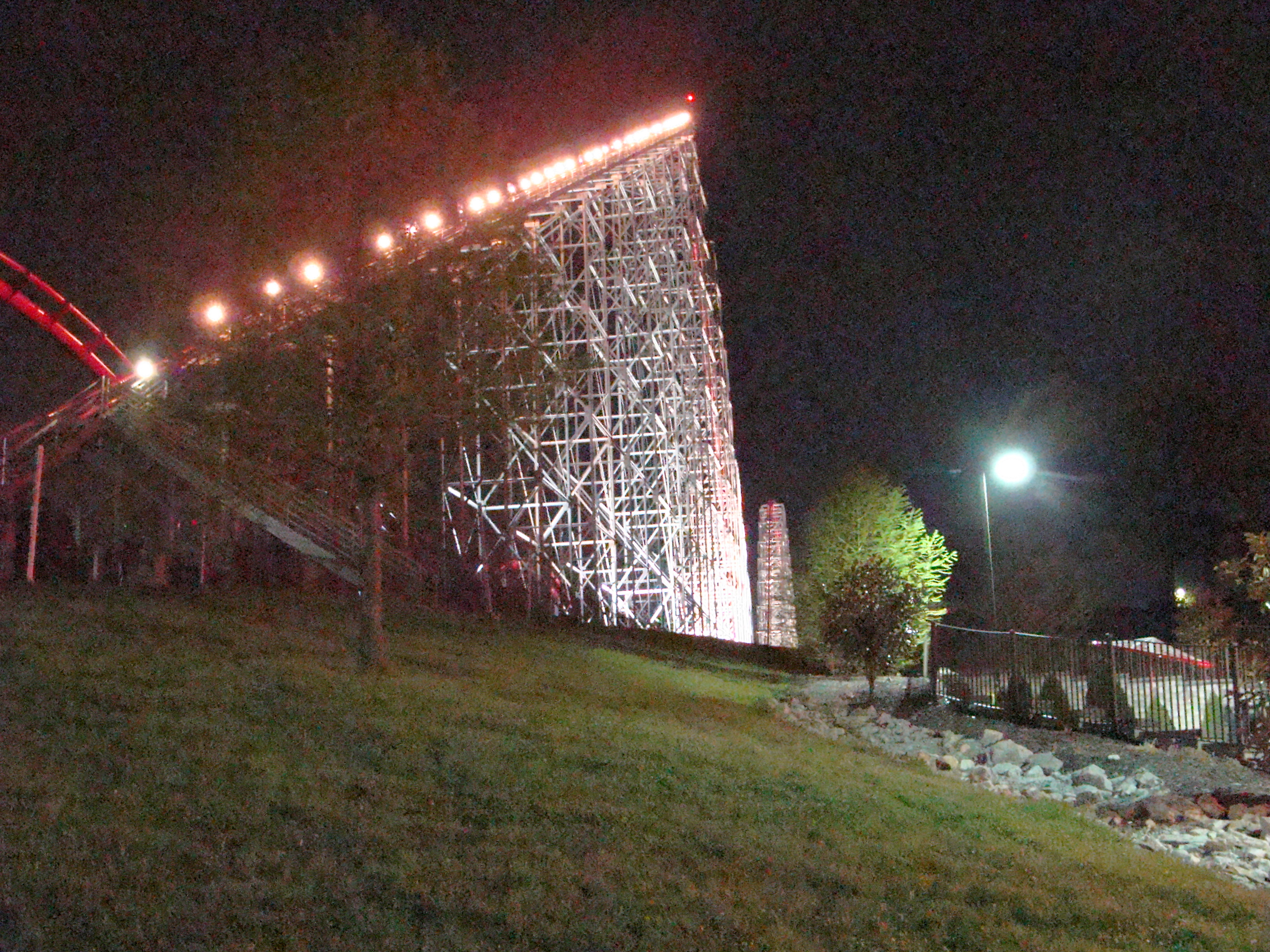
Mamba at night

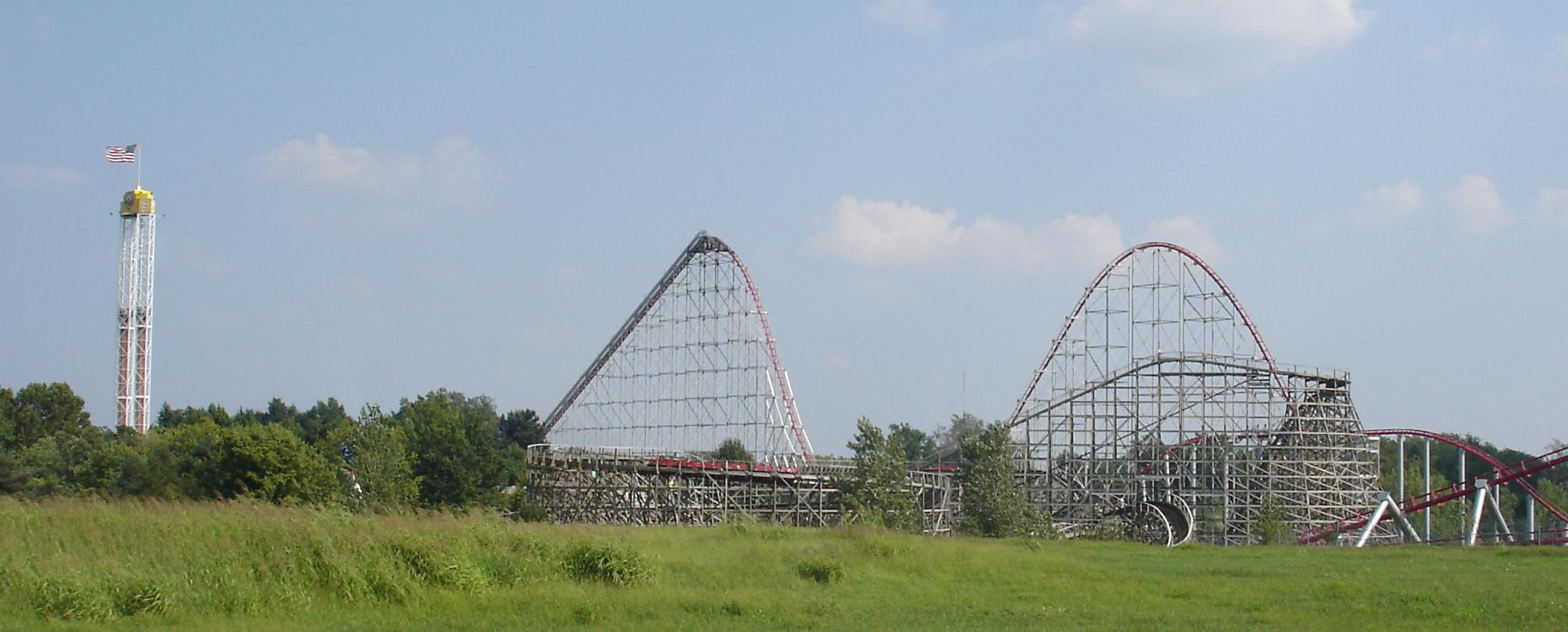
Mamba as seen from outside the park

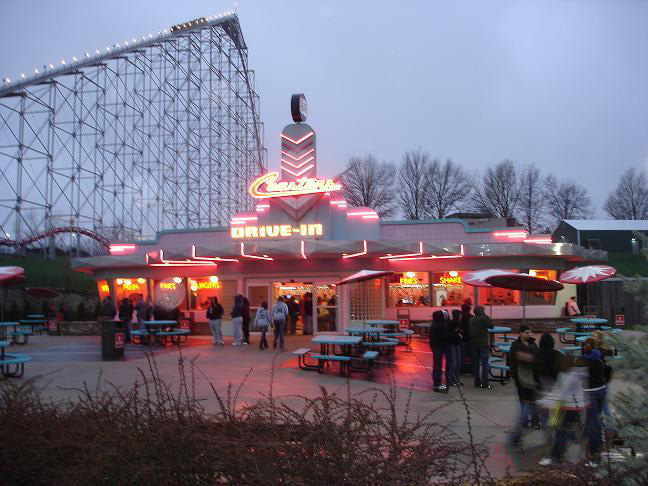
Mamba towering over Coaster's Drive In

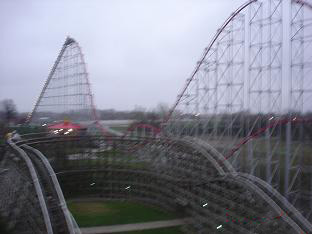
Mamba dwarfing Timber Wolf

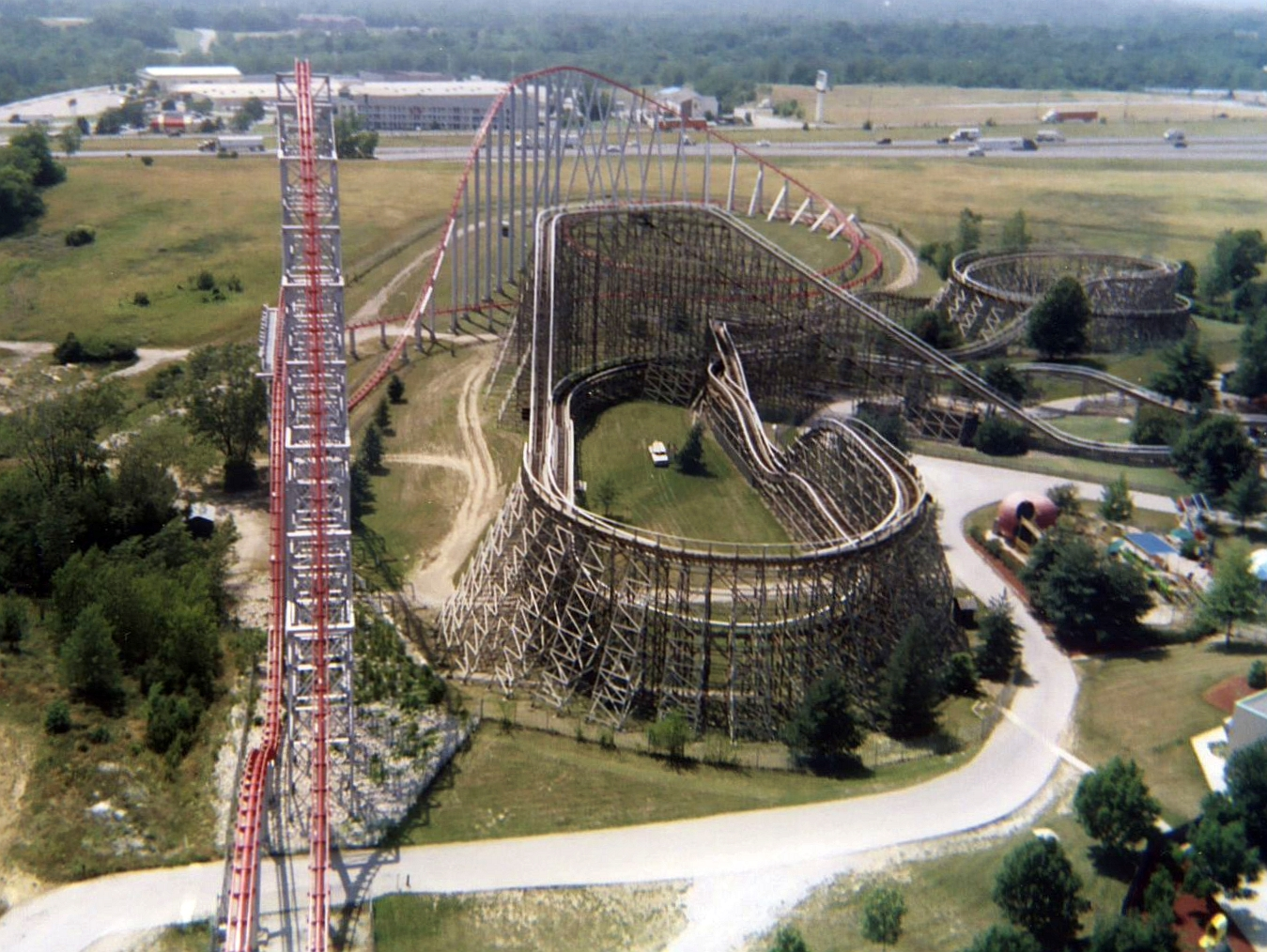
View from atop of the lift hill in 2006
