= Pacific Park =

Amusement park in California

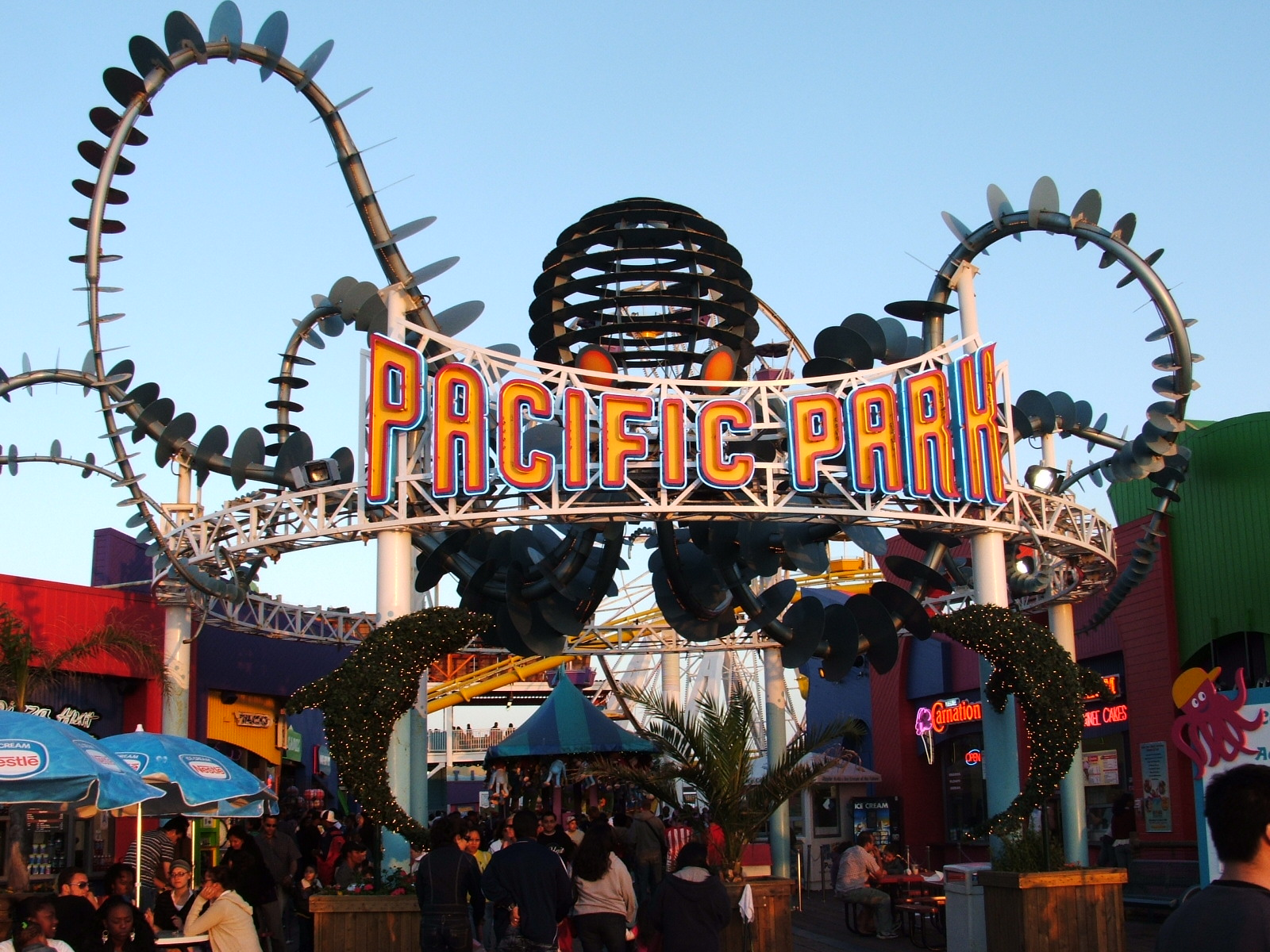
- Pacific Park entrance in 2004
- Interactive map of Pacific Park
- Location: Santa Monica, California, United States
- Coordinates: 34°00′30″N 118°29′53″W
- Status: Operating
- Opened: May 25, 1996
- Owner: SC Holdings
- Operated by: Santa Monica Amusements LLC
- Slogan: "The Family Amusement Park on the Santa Monica Pier" "LA's only admission-free amusement park"
- Operating season: Year-round; Limited operation in off season
- Area: 2 acres (0.81 ha)

Attractions
- Total: 13
- Roller coasters: 1
- Website: pacpark.com

Pacific Park is an oceanfront amusement park located on the Santa Monica Pier in Santa Monica, California. It is the only amusement park on the West Coast located directly on a pier, and the only admission-free amusement park in Los Angeles County.

Pacific Park faces the Pacific Ocean, towards the direction of Santa Catalina Island. The park hosts several food and retail outlets, as well a total of twelve rides, including a roller coaster that encircles the majority of the area and the world's first and only solar-powered ferris wheel. The park has appeared in over 500 films and television shows such as Fat Albert, Hannah Montana, Kidsongs, 90210, Bean, and The Tonight Show with Jay Leno, as well as video games such as Grand Theft Auto V. It is operated by Santa Monica Amusements LLC, which was acquired by SC Holdings in March 2024.

== History ==
Santa Monica Municipal Pier opened in 1909; it was primarily to carry sewer pipes out beyond the breakers and had no amenities. In 1916, Charles I. D. Looff, who built Coney Island's first carousel, started construction on an adjacent pier known as the Pleasure Pier, also called Newcomb Pier, for use as an amusement park. The two piers are now both considered to be part of Santa Monica Pier. Attractions on the Pleasure Pier eventually included the Santa Monica Looff Hippodrome building (which now houses the current carousel and is listed on the National Register of Historic Places), the Blue Streak Racer wooden roller coaster (which was purchased from the defunct Wonderland amusement park in San Diego), the Whip, merry-go-rounds, Wurlitzer organs, and a funhouse. The Pleasure Pier thrived during the 1920s but faded during the Great Depression. During the 1930s, the pier was mainly used as a ferry landing, while most of the pier was closed down and its attractions sold off.

Over the next several decades the city of Santa Monica proposed various plans to tear down Newcomb Pier. The city council approved a plan to replace the pier with a resort island in Santa Monica Bay. Local activists formed Save Santa Monica Bay and shot down that plan, and in 1973, the city formally revoked a standing order to demolish the pier. The city acquired ownership of the privately owned pier in summer 1974. In the 1980s, the pier was almost destroyed by winter storms. In 1983, the city formed a Pier Restoration and Development Task Force (now the Pier Restoration Corporation), tasked with returning the pier to its former glory. Summer music concerts were held on the pier.

In 1989, the Pier Restoration Corporation decided to "make the pier a year-round commercial development with amusement rides, gift shops, nightclubs with live entertainment and restaurants" that would be "reminiscent of its heyday in the 1920s and 1930s". The current 2-acre (0.81 ha) park opened in 1996 as a full-scale family amusement park.

== Rides and attractions ==
The park is "non-gated" and there is no charge for admission; individual rides charge a fee. There are thirteen rides as well as midway games, food outlets, and shopping. A Seaside Pavilion event space opened in 2009 for corporate and private events. This is a list of rides in operation at Pacific Park as of 2016.

=== Rollercoaster ===
- West Coaster – A steel roller coaster running around the perimeter of Pacific Park. West Coaster's maximum height is 55 feet (17 m), and the single train reaches speeds of 35 miles per hour.

=== Thrill rides ===
- Inkie's Scrambler – A 12-car Scrambler, refurbished in 2013
- Sea Dragon – A Dragon with a 180° swing.
- Pacific Plunge – A 45-foot (14 m) drop tower built by Moser Rides. Carries 10 seated people in two gondolas. Refurbished in 2012
- Shark Frenzy – A custom built shark-themed twist on a Tilt-a-whirl ride. Each seated shark "head" represents a different species of shark including the Blue, Bull, Great White, Lemon, Mako, Sand Tiger and Tiger species.

=== Family rides ===
- Pacific Wheel – The original Pacific Wheel was listed on eBay with half the proceeds from the sale donated to the Special Olympics. It had 20 gondolas and was featured in the Steven Spielberg film 1941. The current Pacific Wheel measures 85 feet (26 m), and the vantage point at the top is more than 130 feet (40 m) above the pier. The Pacific Wheel is the world's first and only solar-powered Ferris wheel.
- Sig Alert EV – A bumper car ride named for the traffic alert unique to California.

=== Children's rides ===
- Inkie's Frog Hopper – A scaled-down 'bouncing' drop tower reaching 18 feet (5.5 m)
- Inkie's Wave Jumper
- Inkie's Sea Planes
- Inkie's Air Lift
- Seaside Swing – Seats up to 16 guests on a two-sided bench that sways back and forth in a 45 degree arc.
- Inkie's Sig Alert – Kiddie version of bumper cars.

=== Attraction, additional ===
- Gyro Loop – Players use a joystick to control their speed and RPM while circling and rotating, in an attempt to win a prize.

=== Past rides and attractions ===
- Chaos: removed and replaced by Inkie's Scrambler
- Rock and Roll: removed for Chaos and later replaced by Inkie's Scrambler
- La Monica Swing Ride: removed for Pirates Pier Mini-Golf and later replaced by Sig Alert EV
- Inkie's Pirate Ship - Last day was in Q1 of 2017; removed and replaced by Shark Frenzy
- Pier Patrol – A 'train' of cars propelled around a beach-themed track. Removed and replaced by Seaside Swing
- Pirates Pier Mini-Golf: removed and replaced by Sig Alert EV
- Bumper Cars: removed and replaced by Inkie's Sea Planes and Inkie's Air Lift
- Mini Pirate Ship
- Lil' Scrambler
- Baron Planes: removed and replaced by Inkie's Wave Jumper
- Balloon Race
- Turtles
- Crazy Submarine: removed and replaced by Seaside Swing
- Mini Swing Ride
- Rock Climber
- Bungee Jumper
- Extraordinary Bike: removed and replaced by Gyro Loop

== Gallery ==
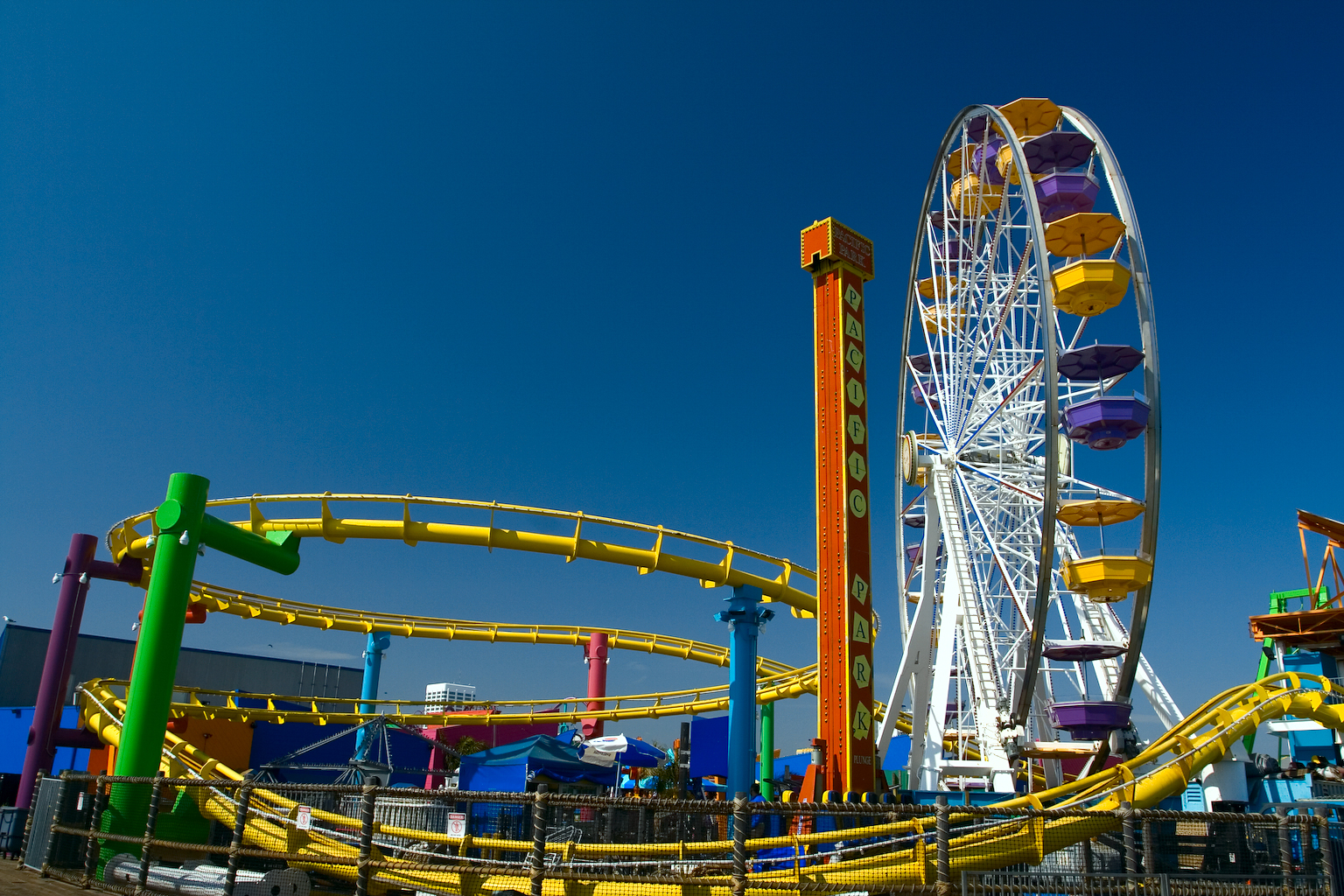
Close up of Pacific Plunge as viewed from southwest

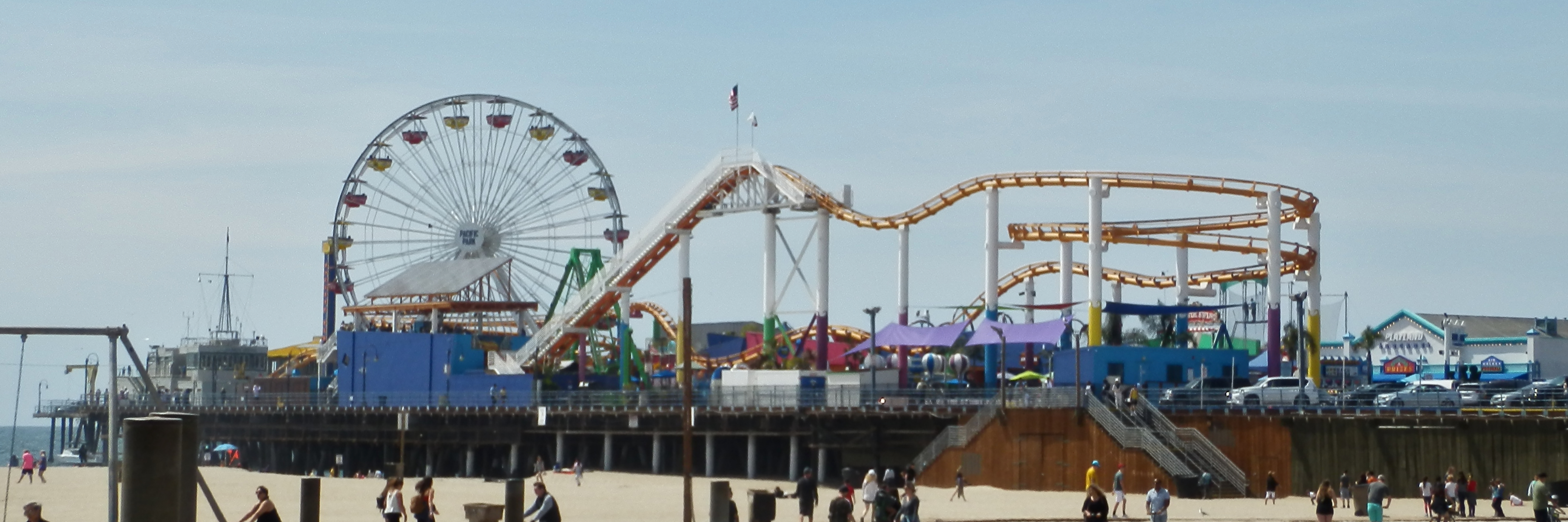
Profile of Pacific Plunge as viewed from the south

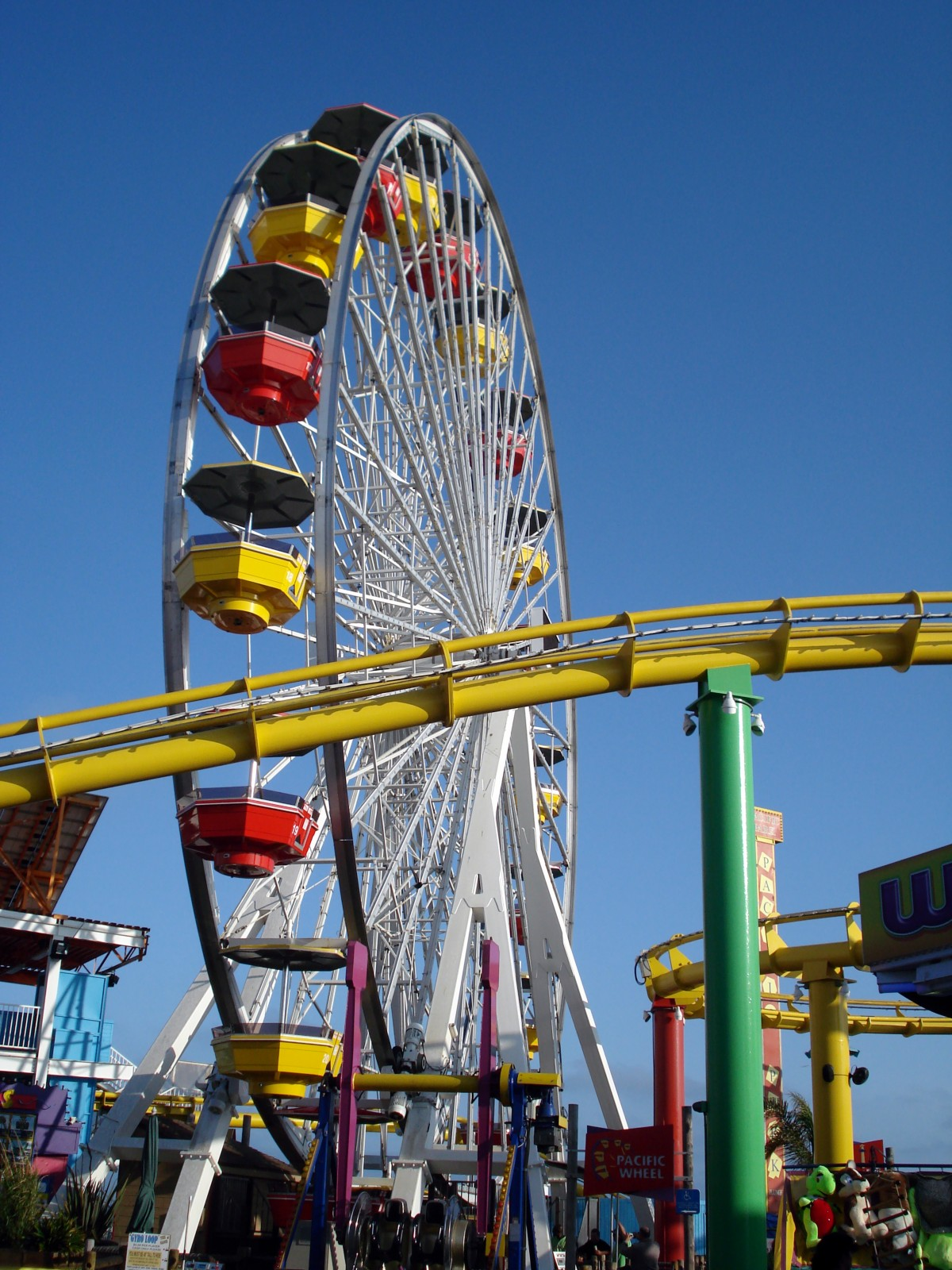
The solar-powered ferris wheel in 2009.

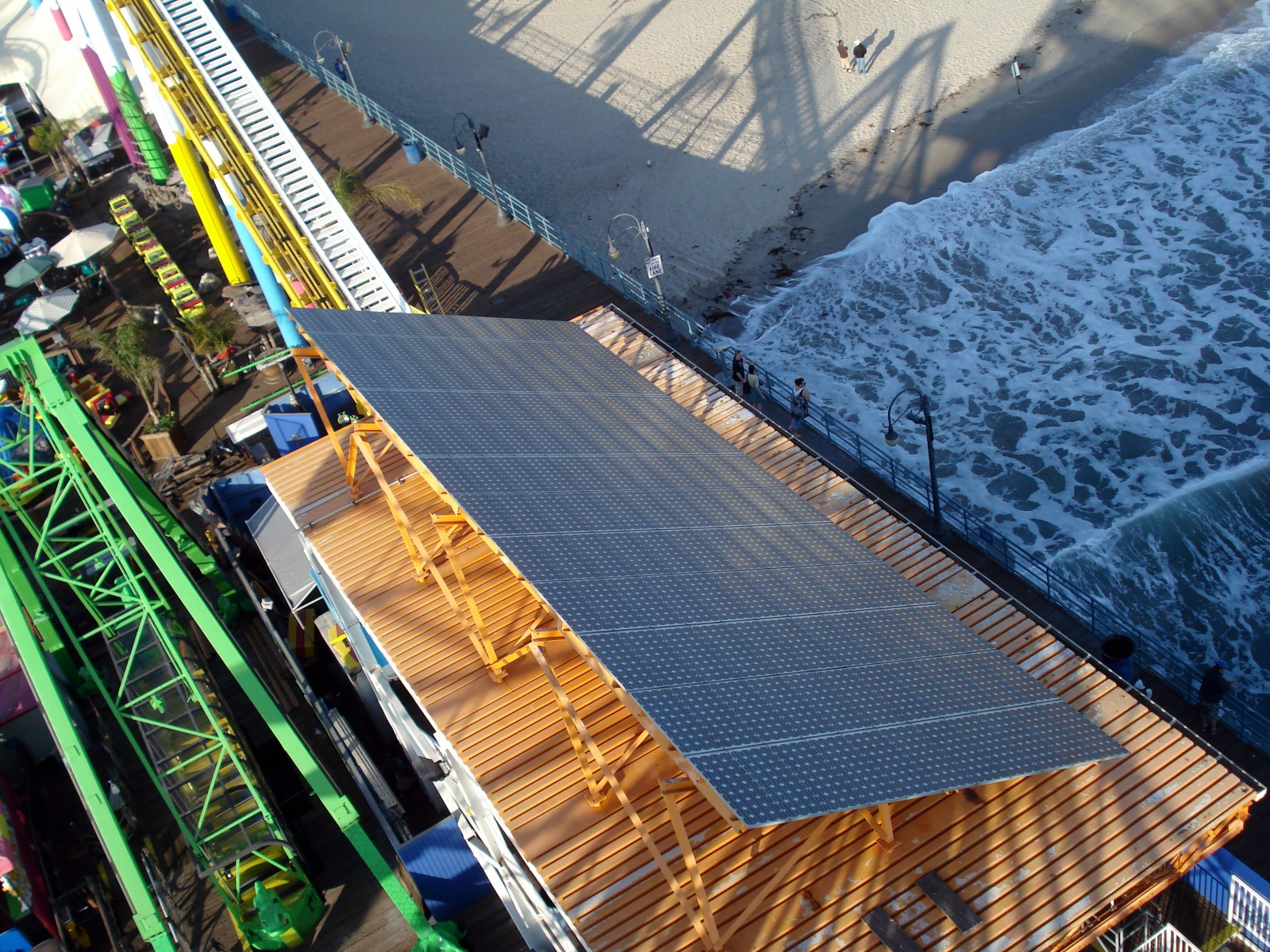
The solar panel powering the wheel, 2009.

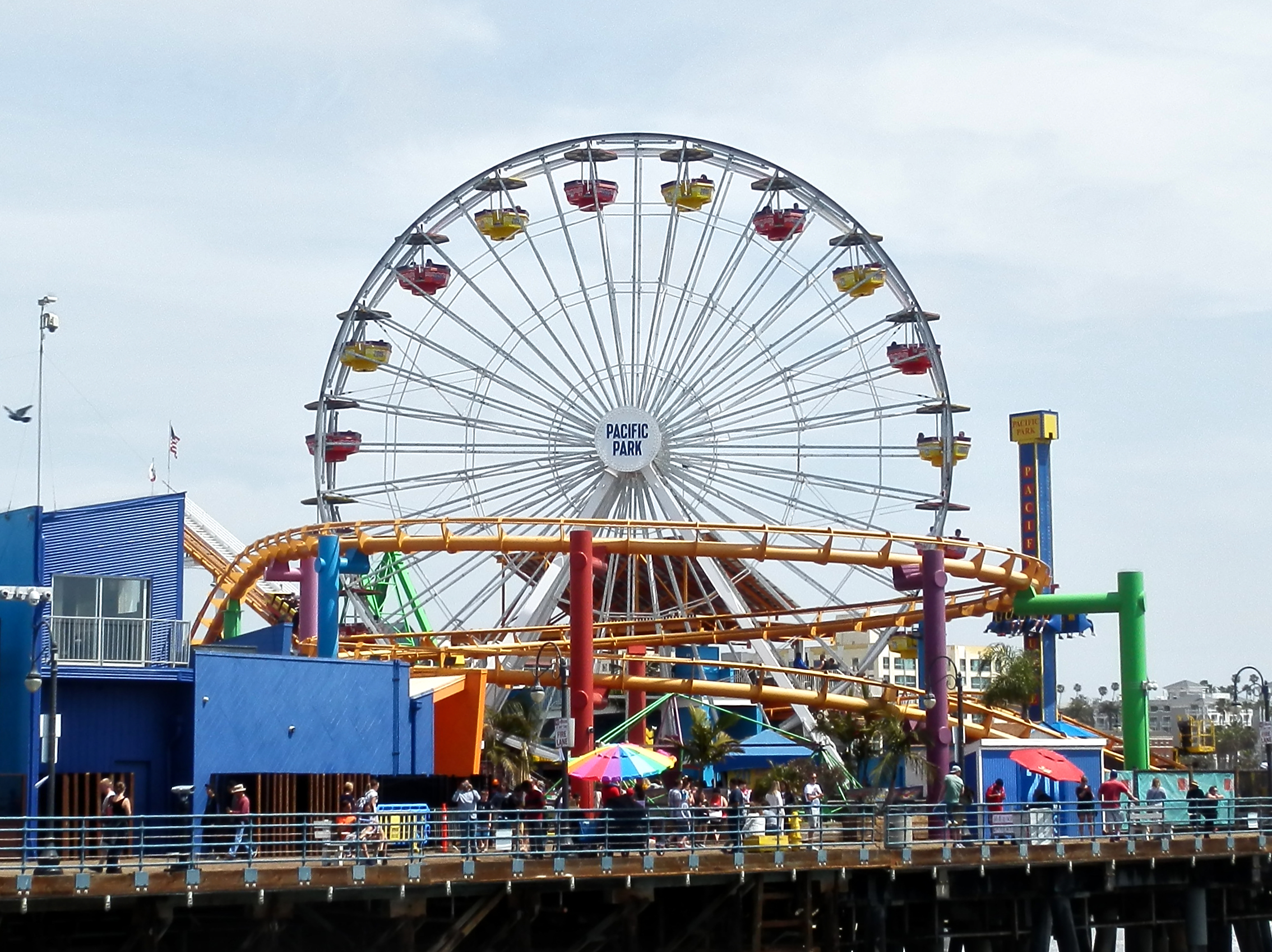
Pacific Plunge as seen from the end of Santa Monica Pier

== Filming Films ==
- Bean (1997) (Amusement Simulator: It's Frightening!: Ride Of Doom – Volcano Mine Ride.)
- Hurry Up Tomorrow (2025)
