= Steel Force =

Steel roller coaster at Dorney Park

- Steel Force in July 2001

Dorney Park & Wildwater Kingdom
- Location: Dorney Park & Wildwater Kingdom
- Coordinates: 40°34′44″N 75°32′17″W
- Status: Operating
- Opening date: May 30, 1997
- Cost: US$10,000,000

General statistics
- Type: Steel
- Manufacturer: D. H. Morgan Manufacturing
- Designer: Steve Okamoto
- Model: Hyper Coaster
- Track layout: Out-and-back
- Lift/launch system: Chain lift hill
- Height: 200 ft (61 m)
- Drop: 205 ft (62 m)
- Length: 5,600 ft (1,700 m)
- Speed: 75 mph (121 km/h)
- Inversions: 0
- Duration: 3:00
- Max vertical angle: 61°
- Capacity: 1,700 riders per hour
- G-force: 3.4
- Height restriction: 48 in (122 cm)
- Trains: 3 trains with 6 cars; riders arranged 2 across in 3 rows for a total of 36 riders per train
- Fast Lane available
- Steel Force at RCDB

Steel Force is a steel roller coaster located at Dorney Park & Wildwater Kingdom in Allentown, Pennsylvania. At 5,600 feet (1,700 m) in length, Steel Force is tied with Mamba at Worlds of Fun as the ninth-longest steel coaster in the world as of 2026.

Built by D. H. Morgan Manufacturing and designed by Steve Okamoto, the roller coaster opened to the public on May 30, 1997, and was billed as "the tallest and longest roller coaster on the east coast", featuring a 205-foot (62 m) drop, 5,600 feet (1,700 m) of track, and a maximum speed of 75 mph (121 km/h).

== History ==
On September 16, 1996, Dorney Park announced that Steel Force would be added to the park. The ride opened on May 30, 1997.

Steel Force has been ranked among the top steel coasters in the world several times. Its logo was originally intended to be used for the stand-up coaster Mantis (now Rougarou), which opened at Cedar Point a year earlier. Mantis was originally going to be named "Banshee," but the name and logo were changed prior to its debut. Dorney Park adopted it for its Steel Force coaster a year later.

== Ride experience ==
The train departs the station, entering a slight decline followed by a slight left turn leading into the chain lift hill, ascending 200 feet (61 m). At the top, the train drops down 205 feet (62 m) at a 61-degree angle. At the bottom of the first drop, the train passes through the first of the two tunnels, each 120 feet (37 m) in length. The train then enters a 161 feet (49 m) camelback hill, where riders experience airtime. The train then ascends another hill, before descending into a 510° downward helix. Upon exiting the helix, the train enters a decline into a slight left turn, and ascends into the mid-course brake run, before entering a series of three consecutive airtime hills and a double-up. The train passes through the second tunnel before the second of these hills, and a camera takes on-ride photos at the bottom of this hill before the third hill. Following the double-up element, the train makes a slight left over the base of the lift hill, leading into the final brake run, before making a 180° turn to the right to return to the station.

== Awards ==
Golden Ticket Awards: Top steel Roller Coasters
Year									1998	1999
Ranking									5	4
Year	2000	2001	2002	2003	2004	2005	2006	2007	2008	2009
Ranking	4	4	6	16	11	14	15	20	18	23
Year	2010	2011	2012	2013	2014	2015	2016	2017	2018	2019
Ranking	27	26	39	37	37	45	37	44	–	–
Year	2020	2021	2022	2023	2024	2025	2026			
Ranking	N/A	45	–	–	–	–	–			

== Characteristics ==
=== Track ===
Steel Force's track is 5,600 feet (1,700 m) in length. Each track piece weighs 2,000 tons, with concrete footers for the support structures weighing 12,150,000 pounds (5,510,000 kg). Approximately 2,742 anchor bolts were required to assemble the coaster.

=== Trains ===
Steel Force operates with three trains. Each train has six cars that can seat six riders per car for a total of 36 riders per train. Each train is fitted with individual seat belts and lap bar restraints.

== Gallery ==
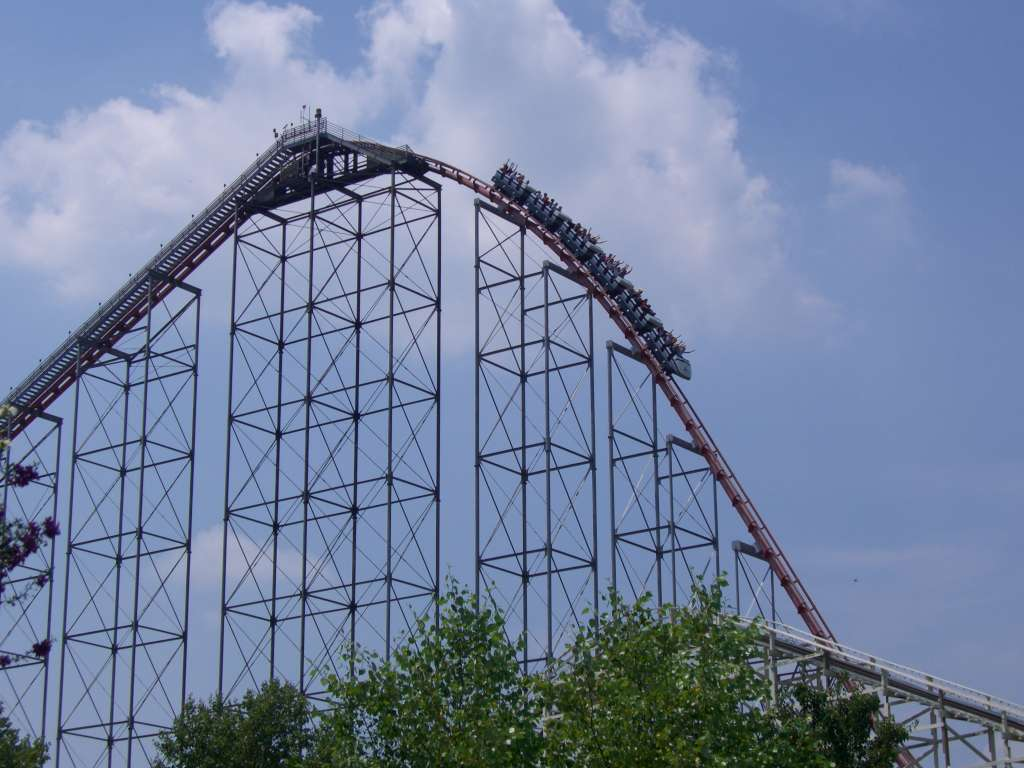
Steel Force's first drop

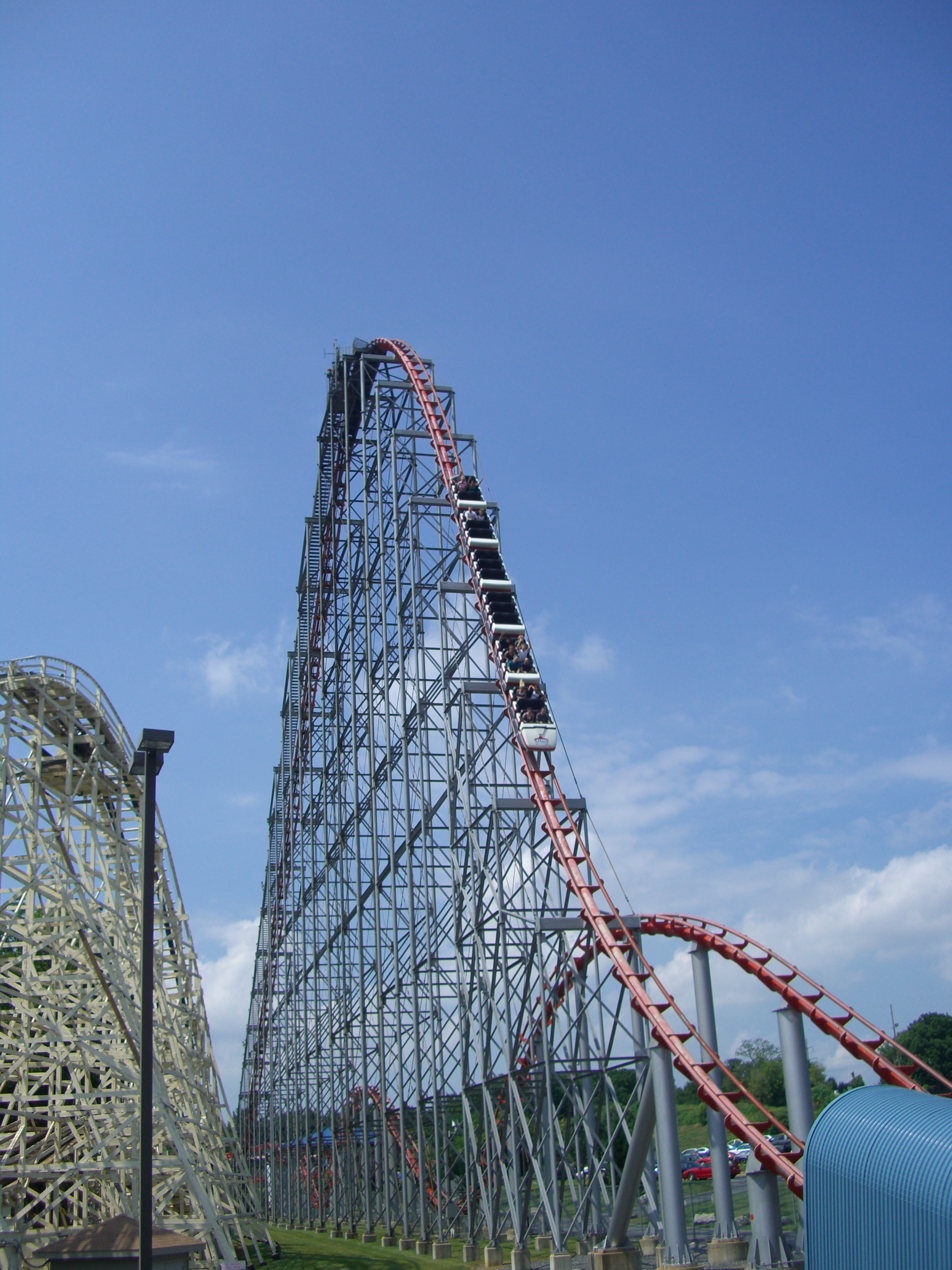
Steel Force's first drop

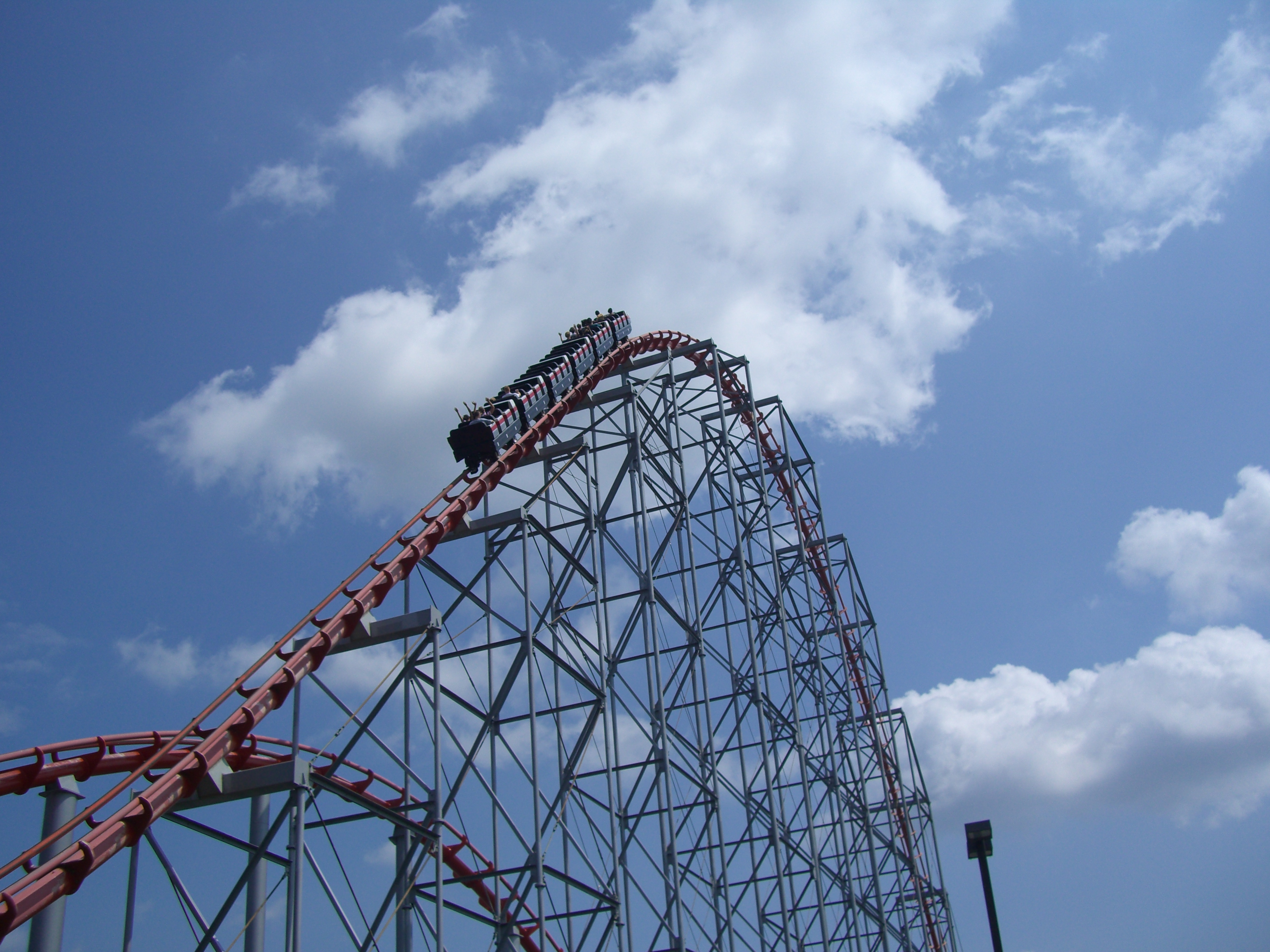
Steel Force's first airtime hill

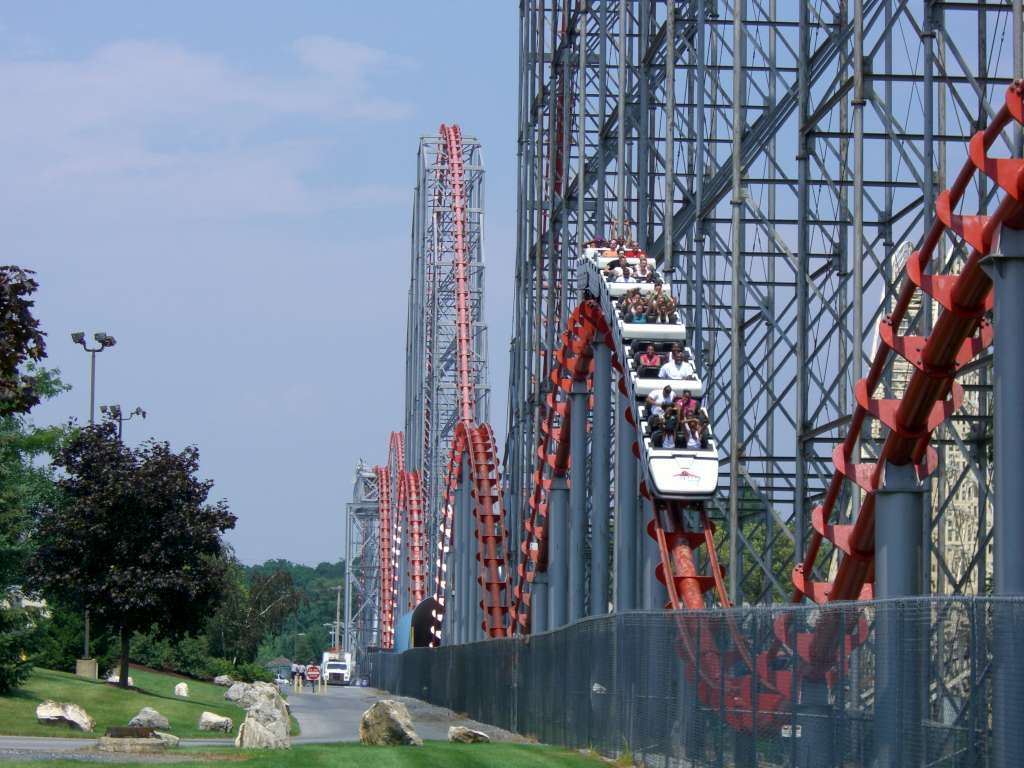
Steel Force's final airtime hills
