= Cedar Fair =

Defunct American amusement park company

Cedar Fair, L.P.
- Logo used from 2015 to 2024

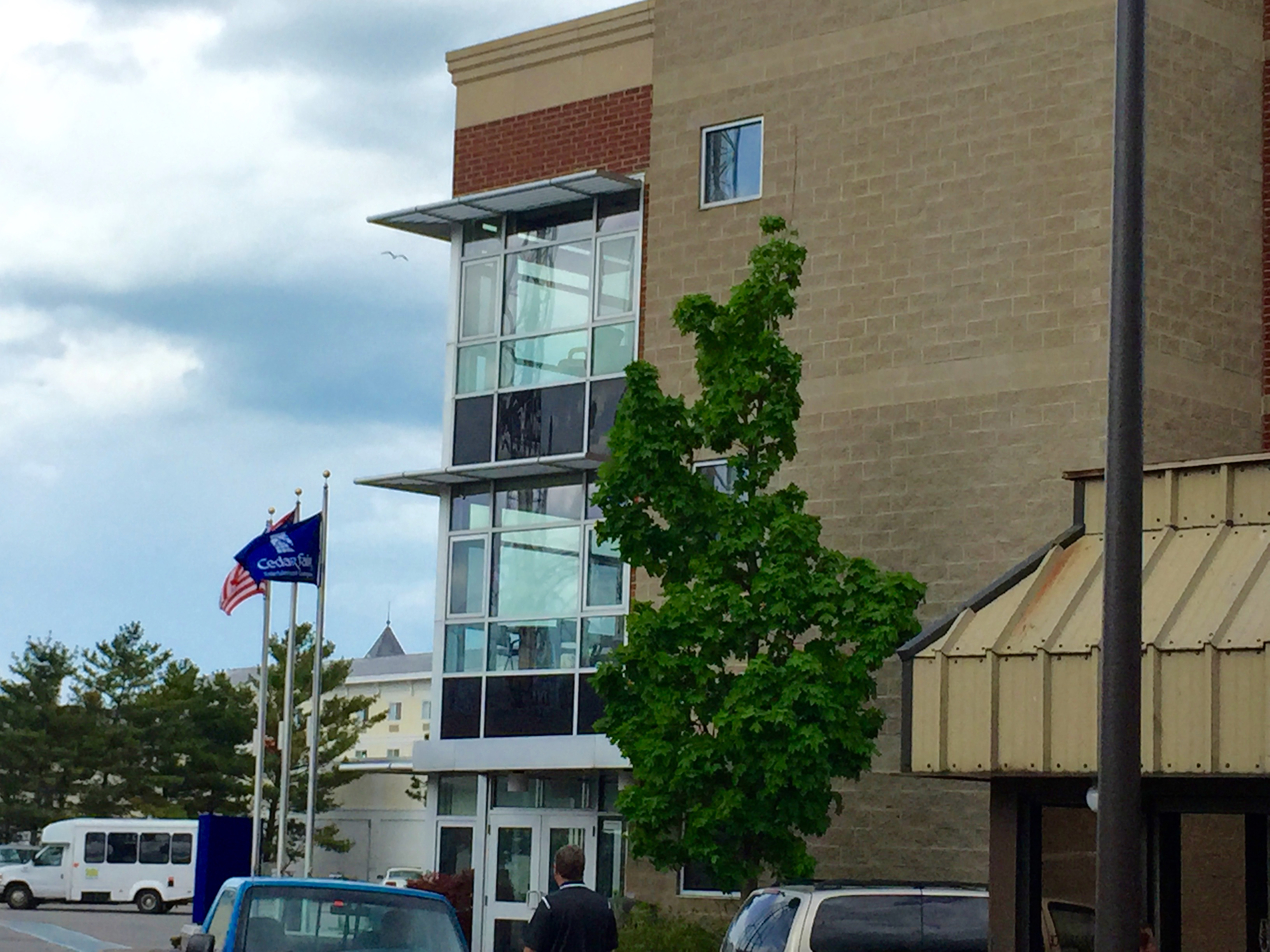
- Headquarters at Cedar Point in Sandusky, Ohio
- Trade name: Cedar Fair Entertainment Company (2006–2024)
- Type: Public
- Traded as: NYSE: FUN
- Industry: Amusement parks
- Founded: 1983; 43 years ago
- Defunct: July 1, 2024; 2 years ago
- Fate: Merged with Six Flags
- Successor: Six Flags
- Headquarters: Sandusky, Ohio, U.S.
- Number of locations: 15 (2024)
- Area served: United States; Canada
- Key people: Richard Zimmerman (CEO, 2018–2024)
- Brands: Schlitterbahn; Soak City
- Revenue: ▼US$1.80 billion (2023)
- Operating income: ▼US$0.31 billion (2023)
- Net income: ▼US$0.12 billion (2023)
- Total assets: ▲US$2.40 billion (2023)
- Number of employees: 53,050 (2023)
- Website: www.cedarfair.com (2023 archive)
- Footnotes; Financials for fiscal year ended December 31, 2023, before merger completion. (Note: 2023 employee count consists of approximately 49,700 part-time employees and 3,350 full-time employees)

Cedar Fair, L.P. (branded as Cedar Fair Entertainment Company) was an American amusement park company headquartered in Sandusky, Ohio, with significant administrative offices in Charlotte, North Carolina. Formed in 1983 via Cedar Point's acquisition of Valleyfair, it was the seventh-largest amusement park company in the world by attendance, hosting 26.7 million guests in 2023. Before its 2024 merger into Six Flags, Cedar Fair owned 11 amusement parks and 4 separately-gated water parks. Additionally, Cedar Fair had theme park licensing rights to use Peanuts intellectual properties at its parks.

In November 2023, Cedar Fair and competitor Six Flags announced plans to merge. The merger closed on July 1, 2024, with combined company is operating under the name Six Flags Entertainment Corporation. Former Cedar Fair unitholders own a 51.2% majority stake in the combined company, which kept Cedar Fair's stock ticker, FUN, for the New York Stock Exchange. At the time of the merger's completion, the combined company operated 42 properties and was the largest amusement park operator in North America.

== History ==
The Cedar Point amusement park began as a bathing beach resort in the 1870s, and its growing popularity as a recreational destination led to the formation of Cedar Point Pleasure Resort Company in 1887. The company was founded with the purpose of expanding the resort commercially. An economic depression in the 1890s threatened the resort's future, however. A newly formed business, Cedar Point Pleasure Resort Company of Indiana led by George Arthur Boeckling, purchased Cedar Point for $256,000 in 1897. It was later reorganized as the G.A. Boeckling Company.

The resort thrived under Boeckling's leadership, which lasted through 1931. G.A. Boeckling Company continued to control operations at the amusement park for much of the 20th century. A proposal in 1974 to build an amusement park in Cambridge Township, Michigan was contemplated and later abandoned the following year.

Then in 1978, Cedar Point acquired Valleyfair amusement park. Parent company Cedar Fair Limited Partnership, commonly known as Cedar Fair, was formed in 1983. Its name was derived from both parks – "Cedar" representing Cedar Point and "Fair" representing Valleyfair. The company went public on April 29, 1987. Under Cedar Fair's leadership, Cedar Point grew to become one of the largest amusement parks in the world, and the company increased its portfolio by acquiring other amusement properties throughout the United States.

=== Dick Kinzel era ===
The first acquisition of the new Cedar Fair company came in 1992 when Cedar Fair bought Dorney Park from Harris Weinstein. Cedar Fair also bought Worlds of Fun from Hunt-Midwest in 1995. One of the biggest acquisitions came in 1997 when Cedar Fair bought Knott's Berry Farm from the Knott family. This marked the first time Cedar Fair operated a year-round amusement park. The acquisition included operations of the Camp Snoopy indoor park at the Mall of America in Bloomington, Minnesota, and the company would gain rights to use Peanuts intellectual properties at its parks. In 2005, Cedar Fair withdrew from the lease arrangement leaving Mall of America to manage the park on its own. Mall of America formed a partnership with the Nickelodeon franchise in 2007 and continues to operate under the name Nickelodeon Universe. Several new water park properties named Knott's Soak City opened around the southern California area since the acquisition which included Buena Park in 1999, Chula Vista in 2000 and Palm Springs in 2001. Michigan's Adventure in Muskegon, Michigan was purchased for $27.6 million in 2001.

Cedar Fair opened its first indoor water park in November 2004, Castaway Bay. It was added to the former Radisson Hotel which was then renamed. The indoor waterpark resort is open year-round.

Larger acquisitions followed in 2004 with Six Flags Worlds of Adventure. Cedar Fair purchased the park for $145 million, reverting its name to Geauga Lake, as it was before its Six Flags branding in 2000. Subsequently, Cedar Fair stripped the park of all references to Looney Tunes and DC Comics characters which were licensed properties owned by Six Flags. The zoological and marine life portion of the complex (SeaWorld Ohio), which was annexed to the theme park in 2001, was also shuttered. Six Flags retained ownership of the animals. The amusement park remained in Cedar Fair's portfolio through 2007, and the water park continued to operate as Wildwater Kingdom through 2016.

On May 22, 2006, Cedar Fair announced it had outbid competitors and intended to purchase all five parks in the Paramount Parks chain, including Star Trek: The Experience at the Las Vegas Hilton and the management agreement of Bonfante Gardens (now known as Gilroy Gardens). On June 30, 2006, Cedar Fair announced that it had completed its acquisition of Paramount Parks from CBS Corporation in a cash transaction valued at US$1.24 billion. With the purchase of the Paramount Parks, Cedar Fair LP announced that it would do business under the name Cedar Fair Entertainment Company. Cedar Fair LP remained the legal company name.

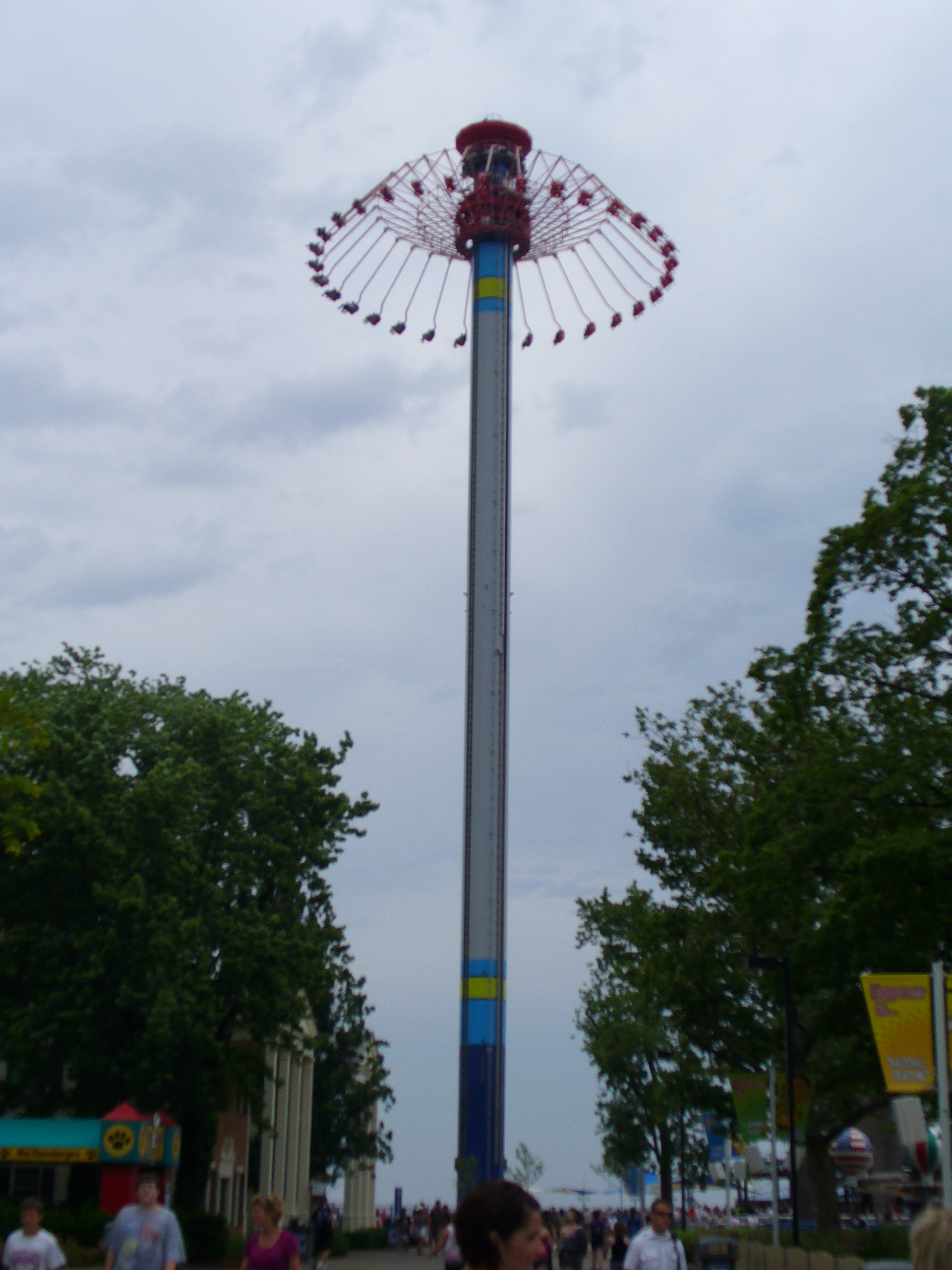
WindSeeker opened at Cedar Point in 2011, and the ride was also added to other Cedar Fair parks.

The individual parks continued to operate under their Paramount names during the 2006 season, and Cedar Fair began removing the Paramount name and logo from the parks in January 2007. The names of the parks were changed back to their original pre-Paramount names (the Paramount's prefix was removed) with the Cedar Fair corporate logo added. Bonfante Gardens was changed to Gilroy Gardens. Cedar Fair began removing references to Paramount Pictures. Although the acquisition granted Cedar Fair a ten-year licensing deal for Paramount names and icons, such as Star Trek, Cedar Fair opted to terminate the agreement and not pay an annual licensing fee. All references to Paramount/CBS-licensed properties were removed before the beginning of the 2008 season. This deal also included a four-year licensing deal for Nickelodeon names and icons, such as SpongeBob SquarePants and Rugrats, this agreement was retained until it expired before the 2010 season.

In December 2009, it was announced that Apollo Global Management would offer Cedar Fair $11.50 per share, a 28 percent premium over the market price, as part of a takeover plan which would also make Cedar Fair a private company. The deal included a cash payment of $635 million in addition to assuming Cedar Fair's debt of over US$1.7 billion putting the total value of the transaction close to US$2.4 billion. Cedar Fair planned to hold a shareholder meeting on March 16, 2010, to vote on the transaction but postponed the meeting to April 8, 2010, implying that two-thirds of the shareholder vote needed for approval wasn't yet secured. On April 6, 2010, the deal was terminated, and Cedar Fair paid $6.5 million to reimburse Apollo for expenses incurred from the proposed transaction. Cedar Fair also adopted a unitholder rights plan as a preventative measure to help protect unitholders in the event of any future hostile takeover.

On September 16, 2011, JMA Ventures, LLC agreed to purchase California's Great America from Cedar Fair and take ownership of the Gilroy Gardens management contract. The agreement required approval of Santa Clara's city council which was scheduled to vote on the matter on December 6, 2011. However, JMA canceled its plans to purchase Great America and bowed out of the agreement.

=== Matt Ouimet era ===
On June 20, 2011, Cedar Fair announced that long term CEO Dick Kinzel would retire on January 3, 2012, and that Matt Ouimet would take his spot as the CEO of Cedar Fair. Ouimet had been employed by The Walt Disney Company for 17 years, including serving as president of Disney Cruise Line and president of the Disneyland Resort. He officially became CEO on January 3. Cedar Fair launched new websites for their parks in 2012 as well as a new marketing campaign, Thrills Connect.

On November 20, 2012, Cedar Fair announced it had sold its Knott's Soak City: San Diego location to SeaWorld Parks & Entertainment. About nine months later, Cedar Fair announced it had sold its Knott's Soak City: Palm Springs location to CNL Lifestyle Properties. Cedar Fair's portfolio, according to an SEC report filed in 2013, contained eleven amusement parks, four outdoor water parks, one indoor water park, and five hotels.

On September 5, 2016, Cedar Fair closed Wildwater Kingdom, the last operating part of the former Geauga Lake & Wildwater Kingdom. A portion of the land that once contained both properties has since been redeveloped.

=== Richard Zimmerman era ===
On October 4, 2017, Cedar Fair announced that Ouimet would step down as CEO and be succeeded by COO Richard Zimmerman on January 1, 2018. Ouimet would remain with the company, taking the newly created position of executive chairman of the board of directors.

On March 27, 2019, Cedar Fair announced it was purchasing the land occupied by California's Great America from the City of Santa Clara. The 112 acres beneath the park cost $150 million. Cedar Fair had been previously leasing the land from the County of Santa Clara for 6 to 7 million per year.

In April 2019, Cedar Fair announced a partnership with Feld Entertainment to bring a Monster Jam Thunder Alley Area to select Cedar Fair parks.

On June 13, 2019, it was announced that Cedar Fair had signed a $261 million deal with Schlitterbahn Waterparks and Resorts to buy their Galveston and New Braunfels locations, with the option to buy Schlitterbahn Kansas City for an additional $6 million, and the rights to the Schlitterbahn name.

On July 2, 2019, it was announced that Cedar Fair had acquired the Sawmill Creek Resort in Huron, Ohio. The property cost $13.5 million.

In October 2019, Six Flags offered to buy Cedar Fair for $4 billion, but the offer was turned down.

On July 29, 2021, Cedar Fair announced the submission of plans to the City of Sandusky to build a $28 million esports arena expansion of the Cedar Fair Sports Center. Targeted opening in the first half of 2023

On December 31, 2021, the contract to manage Gilroy Gardens expired. Both Gilroy Gardens Inc., the nonprofit that owns the park, and Cedar Fair agreed not to renew the contract.

On February 1, 2022, news broke that SeaWorld Entertainment made an unsolicited all-cash bid to buy Cedar Fair for $3.4 billion. Exactly two weeks later, on February 15, 2022, United Parks & Resorts stated that the offer had been rejected.

In June 2022, the company announced that it was selling the land occupied by California's Great America to Prologis, a logistics real estate development company, for $310 million. Cedar Fair signed an 11-year lease with Prologis and announced it intends to close the park at the conclusion of the lease.

=== Merger with Six Flags ===
The logo of the newly formed company, Six Flags, after the merger's completion on July 1, 2024.

On July 21, 2023, Zimmerman approached Selim Bassoul, the then-CEO of Six Flags to discuss a potential business combination. Subsequent merger negotiations would continue through November 2023.

On November 2, 2023, Cedar Fair announced plans to merge with Six Flags, forming a combined company that would retain the Six Flags name. Described as a "merger of equals", former Cedar Fair management would remain in control of the new company, which will be headquartered in Charlotte, North Carolina, the former headquarters of Paramount Parks before being acquired by Cedar Fair in 2006. Some financial and administrative operations would continue to reside in Sandusky, Ohio. The combined company initially had 27 amusement parks, 15 water parks, and 9 resort properties in its portfolio. Zimmerman would serve as president and CEO of the new combined company, while Bassoul would become the executive chairman of the company's board of directors. On July 1, 2024, the merger was completed.

== Properties ==
Interactive map of all Cedar Fair parks.

At the time of its combination with Six Flags on July 1, 2024, Cedar Fair consisted of 15 properties: 11 amusement parks and 4 separately-gated water parks, all of which were fully owned. (Note: While all parks were owned by Cedar Fair, the land of California's Great America and Schlitterbahn Galveston were leased.)

United States

- 1 in the Northeastern United States
  - 1 amusement park
- 6 in the Midwestern United States
  - 5 amusement parks
  - 1 water park
- 4 in the Southern United States
  - 2 amusement parks
  - 2 water parks
- 3 in the Western United States
  - 2 amusement parks
  - 1 water park

International

- 1 in Canada
  - 1 amusement park

=== Amusement parks ===
Name	Location	Year opened	Year acquired	Notes
California's Great America	Santa Clara, California	1976	2006	Open seasonally. Acquired in Paramount Parks deal.
Canada's Wonderland	Vaughan, Ontario, Canada	1981	2006	Cedar Fair's most visited seasonal park, acquired in the Paramount Parks deal.
Carowinds	Charlotte, North Carolina	1973	2006	Acquired in the Paramount Parks deal. A portion of the park is in Fort Mill, South Carolina.
Cedar Point	Sandusky, Ohio	1870	—N/a	Cedar Fair's flagship park is the oldest park in the chain. Cedar Fair's corporate headquarters were at this park.
Dorney Park	Allentown, Pennsylvania	1884	1992	First park acquired under the Cedar Fair name, acquired from Harris Weinstein. Purchase price $48M
Kings Dominion	Doswell, Virginia	1975	2006	Acquired in the Paramount Parks deal.
Kings Island	Mason, Ohio	1972	2006	Acquired in the Paramount Parks deal.
Knott's Berry Farm	Buena Park, California	1920	1997	Acquired from the Knott Family in 1997, the park is open year-round and is the most-visited Cedar Fair park.
Michigan's Adventure	Muskegon, Michigan	1956	2001	Acquired from the Jourden family. Purchase price $28M
Valleyfair	Shakopee, Minnesota	1976	1978	Acquired by Cedar Point. Cedar Point and Valleyfair then formed Cedar Fair in 1987.
Worlds of Fun	Kansas City, Missouri	1973	1995	Acquired from Hunt-Midwest. Purchase price $40M

=== Water parks ===
==== Located within amusement parks ====
Water park	Location	Associated park	Year opened	Year acquired	Notes
Carolina Harbor	Charlotte, North Carolina	Carowinds	1982	2006	Located within Carowinds, acquired in the Paramount Parks deal.
Oceans of Fun	Kansas City, Missouri	Worlds of Fun	1982	1995	Located adjacent to Worlds of Fun. In 2013, the water park became included with admission to Worlds of Fun.
Soak City	Doswell, Virginia	Kings Dominion	1992	2006	Located within Kings Dominion, acquired in the Paramount Parks deal.
Soak City	Mason, Ohio	Kings Island	1989	2006	Located within Kings Island, acquired in the Paramount Parks deal.
Soak City	Shakopee, Minnesota	Valleyfair	1983		Located within Valleyfair.
South Bay Shores	Santa Clara, California	California's Great America	2004	2006	Located within California's Great America, acquired in Paramount Parks deal.
Splash Works	Vaughan, Ontario	Canada's Wonderland	1992	2006	Located within Canada's Wonderland, acquired in the Paramount Parks deal.
WildWater Adventure	Muskegon, Michigan	Michigan's Adventure	1991	2001	Located within Michigan's Adventure.
Wildwater Kingdom	Allentown, Pennsylvania	Dorney Park	1985	1992	Located within Dorney Park.

==== Separate admission or property ====
Name	Location	Year opened	Year acquired	Notes
Cedar Point Shores	Sandusky, Ohio	1988	—N/a	Located adjacent to Cedar Point.
Knott's Soak City	Buena Park, California	2000	—N/a	Located adjacent to Knott's Berry Farm.
Schlitterbahn Galveston	Galveston, Texas	2006	2019	Acquired in 2019 from the Henry family.
Schlitterbahn New Braunfels	New Braunfels, Texas	1979	2019	Acquired in 2019 from the Henry family.

=== Lodging ===
Name	Location	Type	Year opened	Year acquired	Associated park
Carowinds Camp Wilderness	Charlotte, North Carolina	RV camping	1985	2006	Carowinds
Castaway Bay	Sandusky, Ohio	Resort/water park	1989	1996	Cedar Point
Cedar Point's Express Hotel	Sandusky, Ohio	Hotel	2000	—N/a	Cedar Point
Hotel Breakers	Sandusky, Ohio	Hotel	1905	—N/a	Cedar Point
Kings Dominion KOA	Doswell, Virginia	RV camping	1978	2006	Kings Dominion
Knott's Hotel	Buena Park, California	Hotel	1968	1998	Knott's Berry Farm
Lighthouse Point	Sandusky, Ohio	Campground	2001	—N/a	Cedar Point
Sawmill Creek	Huron, Ohio	Golf resort	1972	2019	Cedar Point
SpringHill Suites Charlotte	Charlotte, North Carolina	Hotel	2019	—N/a	Carowinds
The Resorts at Schlitterbahn	New Braunfels, Texas	Varied	1979	2019	Schlitterbahn New Braunfels
Worlds of Fun Village	Kansas City, Missouri	Campground	2005	—N/a	Worlds of Fun

=== Other properties ===
Name	Location	Year opened	Notes
Cedar Point Sports Center	Sandusky, Ohio	2020	Located as part of the Cedar Point complex. Land owned by Cedar Fair, operated by Sports Facilities Management.
Sports Force Parks	Sandusky, Ohio	2017	Part of the Cedar Point Sports Center complex. Land owned by Cedar Fair, operated by Ripken Baseball.

=== Former ===
The following former properties refer to properties that were closed or sold by Cedar Fair before the merger's completion on July 1, 2024.

Name	Location	Year opened or acquired	Year closed or sold	Notes
Geauga Lake	Aurora, Ohio	2004	2007	Purchased from Six Flags in 2004 for $145 million. Closed ride side in 2007, the water park, Wildwater Kingdom, closed on September 5, 2016.
Gilroy Gardens	Gilroy, California	2006	2021	Acquired in the Paramount Parks deal, formerly managed by Cedar Fair until December 2021.
Knott's Camp Snoopy	Mall of America	1992	2005	In 2005, closed for renovation. MOA and Cedar Fair dissolved their agreement in 2006. Now operates as Nickelodeon Universe.
Knott's Soak City: Palm Springs	Palm Springs, California	2001	2013	Opened under the name, Oasis Water Park. Sold to CNL Lifestyle Properties.
Knott's Soak City: San Diego	Chula Vista, California	2000	2012	Opened under the name, White Water Canyon. Sold to SeaWorld Parks & Entertainment, who would later turn it into a Sesame Place.
Star Trek: The Experience	Las Vegas, Nevada	2006	2008	Acquired in Paramount Parks deal. Closed in 2008, Cedar Fair lost the rights to reopen the attraction from CBS Studios in 2010.
Wildwater Kingdom	Aurora, Ohio	2005	2016	Located on former SeaWorld Ohio site.

== Leadership ==
Final leadership as listed in Cedar Fair's Form 10-K as of fiscal year ended December 31, 2023.

=== Board of directors ===
- Daniel J. Hanrahan – board chairman
- Nina Barton
- Louis Carr
- Michelle McKinney Frymire
- Jennifer Mason
- D. Scott Olivet
- Carlos A. Ruisanchez
- Richard A. Zimmerman

=== Executives ===
- Richard A. Zimmerman – chief executive officer and president
- Brian C. Witherow – vice president and chief financial officer
- Tim V. Fisher – chief operating officer
- Brian M. Nurse – chief legal officer and secretary
- David R. Hoffman – chief financial officer
- Monica R. Sauls – chief human resources officer
- Charles E. Myers – creative development

== Fast Lane ==
Fast Lane is an expedited queue system in use at parks formerly associated with Cedar Fair. It was first announced for Kings Island on July 18, 2011. The park served as the testing park for the system. For an increased cost, visitors get a wristband that gives them the ability to wait in a shorter queue for most attractions. Originally, it could only be used from noon to 7:00 PM, but it was soon expanded to be available all day. Fast Lane would be rolled out to all Cedar Fair parks for the 2012 season. There is also Fright Lane, which is Fast Lane for the haunted attractions during the Halloween events. For the 2016 season, Cedar Fair began testing all season Fast Lane at Valleyfair and Dorney Park. By the 2019 season, all parks offered an all-season Fast Lane.

== See also ==
- Dick Kinzel, CEO of Cedar Fair from 1986 to 2012
- Incidents at Cedar Fair parks
