= Carolina Harbor =

Water park in Charlotte, North Carolina

- Location: Carowinds, Charlotte, North Carolina, United States
- Coordinates: 35.104339°N 80.93968°W
- Owner: Six Flags
- Opened: 1982
- Previous names: Ocean Island (1982–1988); Riptide Reef (1989–1996); WaterWorks (1997–2005); Boomerang Bay (2006–2015)
- Operating season: May through September
- Area: 27 acres (11 ha)
- Pools: 6 pools
- Water slides: 29 water slides
- Children's areas: 6 children's areas
- Website: www.sixflags.com/carowinds/carolina-harbor

Carolina Harbor is a water park at Carowinds amusement park in Charlotte, North Carolina. Included with the price of admission to Carowinds, the water park is owned and operated by Six Flags Entertainment Corporation.

== History ==
The water park originally opened as Ocean Island in 1982. In 1989, it was renamed to Riptide Reef. For the 1997 season, Paramount Parks invested $7 million in a 12-acre (49,000 m^{2}) expansion and renamed the park to WaterWorks. Another major expansion occurred in 2006 adding a new Australian theme and changing the name to Boomerang Bay, a name shared with several water parks at other Cedar Fair amusement parks. In 2008, Cedar Fair added a 600,000-US-gallon (2,300 m^{3}) wave pool, Bondi Beach, increasing the total size of the water park to 20 acres (81,000 m^{2}). As part of the multi-year expansion at Carowinds, Boomerang Bay added Surfer's Swell and Dorsal Fin Drop for the 2014 season.

On August 27, 2015, Carowinds announced that Boomerang Bay would undergo a major expansion in 2016 and would be renamed Carolina Harbor. The expansion includes a new wave pool named Surf Club Harbor, 2 children splash areas named Myrtle Turtle Beach and Kitty Hawk Cove, a six-story, six-slide complex named Blackbeard's Revenge, and a new play structure called Seaside Splashworks.

On August 15, 2019, Carowinds announced "Boogie Board Racer", the longest mat racing slide in the southeast. This attraction has 6 separate enclosed, and open to the sun slides.

== List of attractions ==
Thrill level (out of 5)
1 (low) 2 (mild) 3 (moderate) 4 (high) 5 (aggressive)

Name	Opening year	Description	Thrill level
Barracuda Blasters	1989	Fully enclosed inner-tube ride that plunges riders into total darkness	4
Blackbeard's Revenge	2016	Multi-slide complex featuring capsule slides and inner-tube slides. Identical complexes exist at Oceans of Fun, Dorney Park & Wildwater Kingdom, Soak City at Kings Dominion, Soak City at Kings Island, Cedar Point Shores, Knott's Soak City (Adjacent to Knott's Berry Farm), and South Bay Shores at California's Great America.	5
Boogie Board Racer	2021	A six-lane family Mat Racer water slide. It opened as South-East's longest mat racing slide.	4
Carolina Harbor Shore Club	2025	A 3,577 square foot pool area for adults 21+ years of age featuring "Paul Metto’s Boathouse Bar", a swim up bar structure serving alcoholic beverages to guests over a pool edge.	1
Coastal Currents	1997	Lazy river ride	2
Hurricane Falls	1997	Four-person family raft ride that takes riders down four stories of unexpected dips and sharp turns.	4
Kiddy Hawk Cove	2016	An interactive Children's play area with water jets, splash areas and more.	1
Myrtle Turtle Beach	2016	An interactive Children's play area with water jets, splash areas and more.	1
Pelican Plunge	2006	Family-friendly two-person inner-tube water slide	3
Pirate's Landing	1997	Family-oriented, multi-level water fortress complete with slides, bridges, and rope ladders	1
Seaside Splashworks	2016	A multi-level play structure with over 80 play elements, including dozens of interactive spray jets, water guns, net bridges, water wheels, six water slides, and a giant 423-gallon tipping bucket	2
Storm Surge	2001	A complex consisting of two body slides and two inner-tube slides all of which are enclosed	5
Surf Club Harbor	2016	A new 27,000 foot wave pool with 8 massive generators and waves up to 6 feet, and interactive water geysers at the base at the pool	5
Tidal Wave Bay	2008	600,000-US-gallon (2,300 m^{3}) wave pool	5

== Former attractions ==
Name	Opening year	Description	Closing year
Dorsal Fin Drop	2014	351-foot-long enclosed slide that emptied riders into a bowl. Replaced by the Carolina Harbor Shore Club in 2025.	2021
Great Barrier Reef	1982	A small wave pool that was ocean islands first attraction. Closed and removed for Seaside Splashworks play structure.	2015
Sand Dune Lagoon	2006	A relaxation area with pools that included jet sprays and water gushing mushrooms. Closed and removed for the addition of Copperhead Strike.	2017
Southern Sidewinder	1997	A one or two person tube slide that had twist and turns. Closed and removed for expansion of County Fair area.	2016
Surfer's Swell	2014	263-foot-long enclosed slide which plunged riders onto a platform that simulated the movement of ocean waves. Replaced by the Carolina Harbor Shore Club in 2025.	2021
