= Boomerang Bay =

Boomerang Bay may refer to:

== Geography ==
- Boomerang Bay, Bigge Island off the coast of the Kimberley region in Western Australia.

== Water parks ==
The brand 'Boomerang Bay' applied to Cedar Fair properties:

- Boomerang Bay, former name of South Bay Shores water park at California's Great America amusement park
- Boomerang Bay, former name of Carolina Harbor water park at Carowinds amusement park
- Boomerang Bay, former name of Soak City (Kings Island) water park in Mason, Ohio
