= Soak City =

Soak City may refer to:

== Water parks ==
=== Six Flags-owned ===
- Soak City (Kings Dominion), located in Kings Dominion in Doswell, Virginia
- Soak City (Kings Island), located in Kings Island in Mason, Ohio
- Knott's Soak City, located adjacent to Knott's Berry Farm in Buena Park, California
- Cedar Point Shores, a water park adjacent to Cedar Point in Sandusky, Ohio, formerly known as Soak City

=== Other water parks ===
- Froster Soak City, located in Toronto, Canada
- Wet'n'Wild Palm Springs, formerly Knott's Soak City
- Sesame Place (San Diego), formerly Knott's Soak City
- Superior Shores, formerly Soak City, located in Valleyfair in Shakopee, Minnesota

== Other ==
- "Soak City (Do It)", 2023 single by 310babii
