= Six Flags =

American amusement park company

Six Flags Entertainment Corporation
- Logo used since 2024

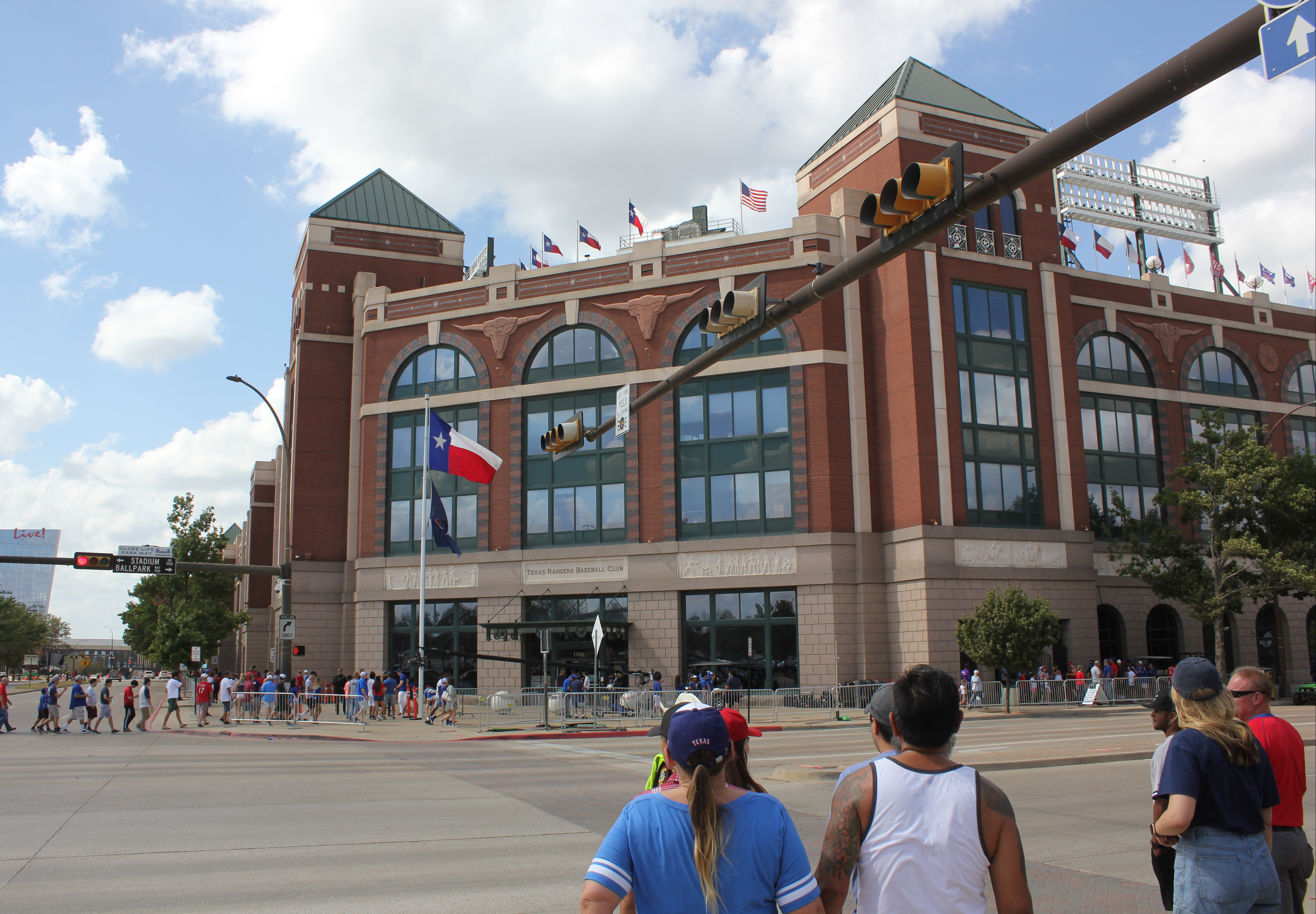
- Corporate offices and future headquarters at the Choctaw Stadium in Arlington, Texas
- Type: Public
- Traded as: NYSE: FUN; Russell 2000 component; S&P 600 component
- ISIN: US83001C1080
- Industry: Amusement parks
- Predecessors: Cedar Fair; Six Flags
- Founded: July 1, 2024; 2 years ago
- Headquarters: Charlotte, North Carolina, U.S.
- Number of locations: 34 (2026)
- Area served: United States; Mexico; Canada; Saudi Arabia (Note: Managed/licensed parks in Saudi Arabia.)
- Key people: Richard Haddrill (executive chairman); John Reilly (president and CEO)
- Services: Amusement parks; live entertainment; lodging; water parks; zoological parks
- Revenue: ▲US$3.10 billion (2025)
- Operating income: ▼US$−1.38 billion (2025)
- Net income: ▼US$−1.60 billion (2025)
- Total assets: ▼US$7.80 billion (2025)
- Total equity: ▼US$0.55 billion (2025)
- Members: ▲5 million (2026) (Note: Reflects total outstanding passholders as of May 3, 2026.)
- Number of employees: ▼95,225 (2025)
- Website: sixflags.com
- Footnotes; Financials as of December 31, 2025. (Note: Employee count includes 91,000 seasonal/part-time employees and 4,225 full-time employees.)

Six Flags Entertainment Corporation is an American multinational amusement park company headquartered in Charlotte, North Carolina, with administrative offices in Sandusky, Ohio, and Arlington, Texas. It was formed on July 1, 2024, through the merger of Cedar Fair and the former Six Flags company. The company has 34 properties in North America, including 20 amusement parks and 14 water parks with nine on-site resorts. The company also manages two parks in Saudi Arabia.

Six Flags is the largest regional amusement park operator in North America and the fifth-largest amusement park operator in the world by attendance, hosting 47.4 million guests in 2025. The company holds exclusive theme park rights to use Warner Bros. intellectual properties such as Looney Tunes and DC Comics, while Peanuts characters are featured at select parks. Six Flags trades under the stock ticker "FUN" on the New York Stock Exchange.

== Background ==
=== Cedar Fair ===
Cedar Fair, L.P was founded in 1983 after Cedar Point, an amusement park in Sandusky, Ohio, acquired Valleyfair in Shakopee, Minnesota, in 1978. The company's name was derived from both parks—"Cedar" from Cedar Point and "Fair" from Valleyfair. Cedar Fair became publicly traded on April 29, 1987. The company would increase its portfolio through acquisitions of amusement parks throughout the United States. Through its 1997 acquisition of Knott's Berry Farm, the company gained licensing rights to use Peanuts intellectual properties within its parks. In 2006, Cedar Fair acquired five amusement parks in the purchase of Paramount Parks from CBS Corporation for US$1.24 billion. Shortly after the acquisitions, the company would begin to do business as under the name Cedar Fair Entertainment Company.

Cedar Fair faced multiple failed acquisition attempts prior to the merger. Private equity company Apollo Global Management announced plans to take over Cedar Fair in late-2009 and make it into a private company. However, Cedar Fair's unitholders did not support the acquisition, which derailed the transaction in 2010. In 2019, Six Flags approached Cedar Fair with a cash-and-stock acquisition offer, which was quickly rejected. Almost three years later in 2022, SeaWorld Entertainment (now United Parks & Resorts) made an unsolicited all-cash bid to buy Cedar Fair for $3.4 billion; this offer was rejected two weeks later. In order to lower overall corporate debts, the company sold California's Great America in Santa Clara, California, on June 27, 2022, to real estate developer Prologis for $310 million. By the end of 2022, Cedar Fair reported it had around $2.2 billion in net debt.

=== Former Six Flags company ===
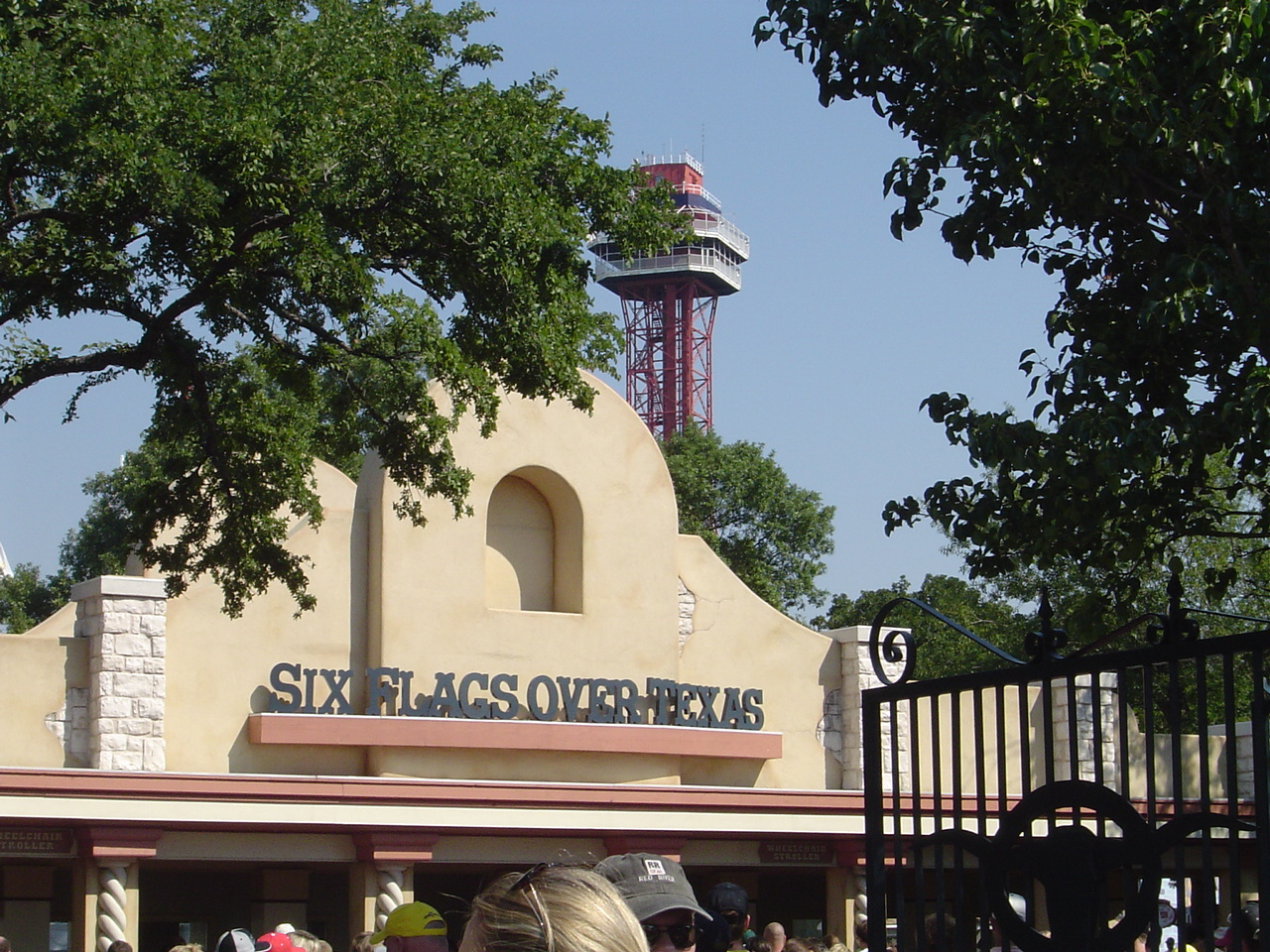
Six Flags Over Texas was the first Six Flags theme park, opening in 1961.

Six Flags Theme Parks, Inc. originated with the creation of The Great Southwest Corporation by Angus G. Wynne and other investors, who would go on to open the chain's original park, Six Flags Over Texas, in August 1961. After the Pennsylvania Railroad gained a controlling stake in the company's shares, a handful of new parks were constructed, and multiple independently-owned parks were purchased over the following two decades. Following the acquisition of Marriott Corporation's Great America theme park in Gurnee, Illinois, in 1984, Six Flags acquired the rights to feature Warner Bros.' Looney Tunes animated characters at its properties; Time Warner (now Warner Bros. Discovery) subsequently purchased much of the company and was its sole owner from 1993 to 1995.

=== Premier Parks ===
Premier Parks was an Oklahoma-based real estate firm and theme park chain. Founded as Tierco, the company purchased Frontier City in Oklahoma City in 1982 for $1.2 million with the intention of tearing it down. Although Frontier City, at the time of purchase, was run-down and struggling, an oil-bust that soured redevelopment prospects coupled with an enigmatic general manager changed the park's fortunes, and Tierco ultimately shifted its strategy to purchasing amusement parks. By 1998, now under the umbrella of Premier Parks, the company had purchased or acquired over 20 parks, including Wild World in Largo, Maryland, Marine World USA, Geauga Lake, Wyandot Lake, Darien Lake, Elitch Gardens, Riverside Park, Kentucky Kingdom, Waterworld USA waterparks in Sacramento and Concord, California, Great Escape and Splashwater Kingdom, and the Walibi family of parks in Belgium, The Netherlands, and France.

On April 1, 1998, Premier Parks acquired the original Six Flags Theme Parks for $1.86 billion. Premier began to apply the Six Flags name to several of its existing properties in North America and Europe, eventually fully assuming the brand name in 2000. Throughout the 2000s, Six Flags began to suffer from growing debt and organizational bloat, eventually resorting to selling off assets like its European parks and Worlds of Adventure in 2004. Some of the company's largest investors grew frustrated with Six Flags and demanded change; Daniel Snyder's Red Zone, LLC successfully gained control of Six Flags' board of directors in 2005 by means of a proxy battle.

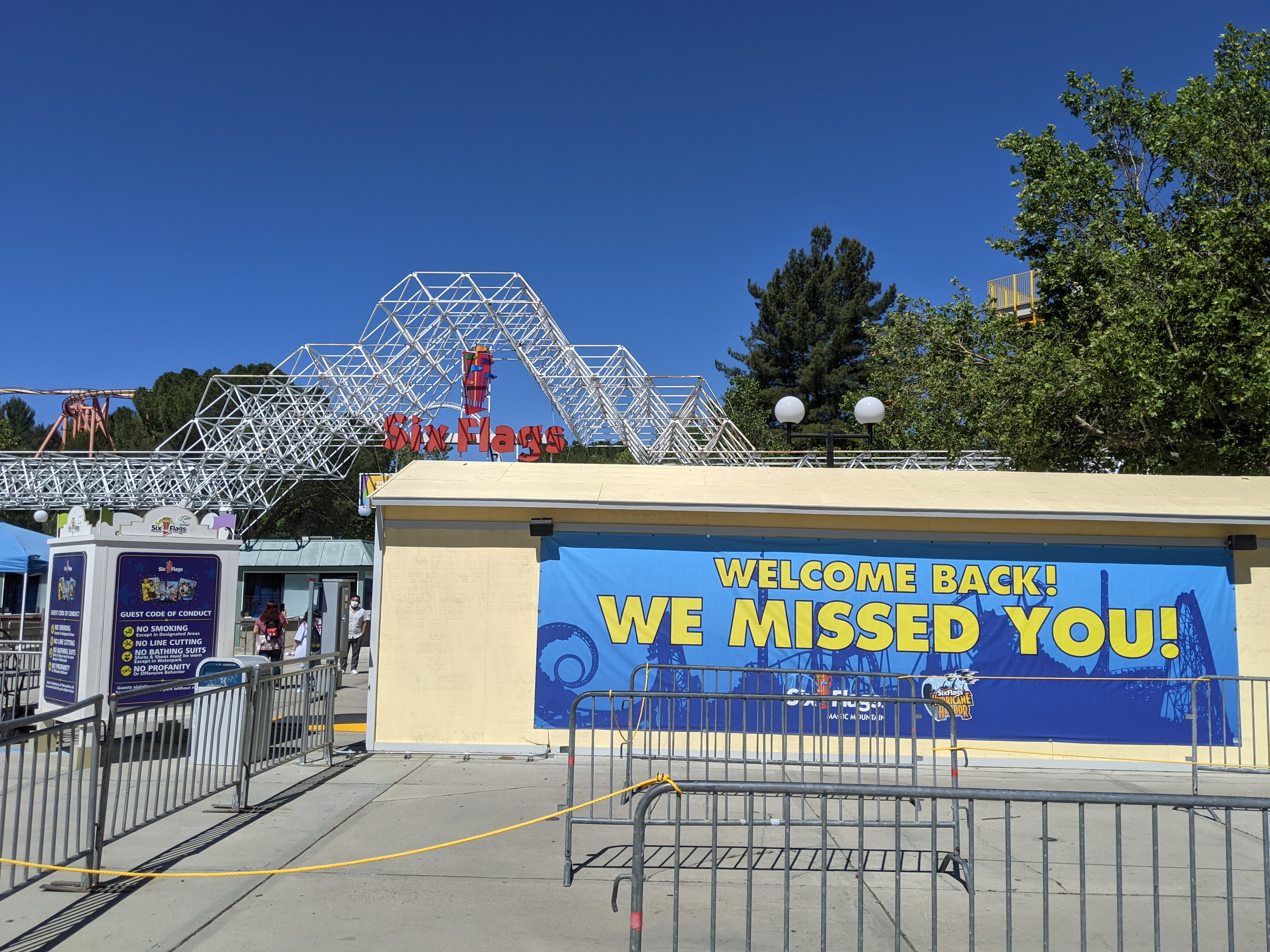
The COVID-19 pandemic significantly impacted operations.

New management continued to sell off various American amusement park locations throughout 2006–2007, although the cash flow continued to decrease, falling $120 million annually under Red Zone's board. Affected by the 2008 financial crisis and the Great Recession, Six Flags filed for Chapter 11 bankruptcy protection in 2009 but continued to operate the parks as normal. Six Flags re-emerged as Six Flags Entertainment Corp. on May 3, 2010, moving head offices from New York City to Grand Prairie, Texas and allowing lenders to control 92% of the company in exchange for cancelling $1.13 billion in debt.

Jim Reid-Anderson was instated as chairman, president and CEO on August 13, 2010. New initiatives were launched to build Six Flags theme parks in global markets; the previously cancelled Six Flags Dubai was revived in 2014 before being called off again in 2018. Mike Spanos succeeded Reid-Anderson in late 2019. Six Flags Zhejiang and Six Flags Chongqing both began construction in China before a declining real estate and the collapse of its local investment firm in 2020 forced both projects to be sold on to other developers. The COVID-19 pandemic also hindered Six Flags' operations during 2020, forcing many parks to remain closed for the year. Mike Spanos stepped down in 2021, allowing chairman Selim Bassoul to assume the role of CEO. Seeking reinvention, Bassoul announced a new strategy favoring guest experience over capital investments; this meant raising prices in order to lower daily park crowds, thus improving the park experience for higher-paying guests. The initiative and various comments made by Bassoul proved controversial with shareholders, and was abandoned in November 2022 after park attendance plummeted by 33%.

== History ==
=== 2023–2024: Merger ===
==== Announcement ====
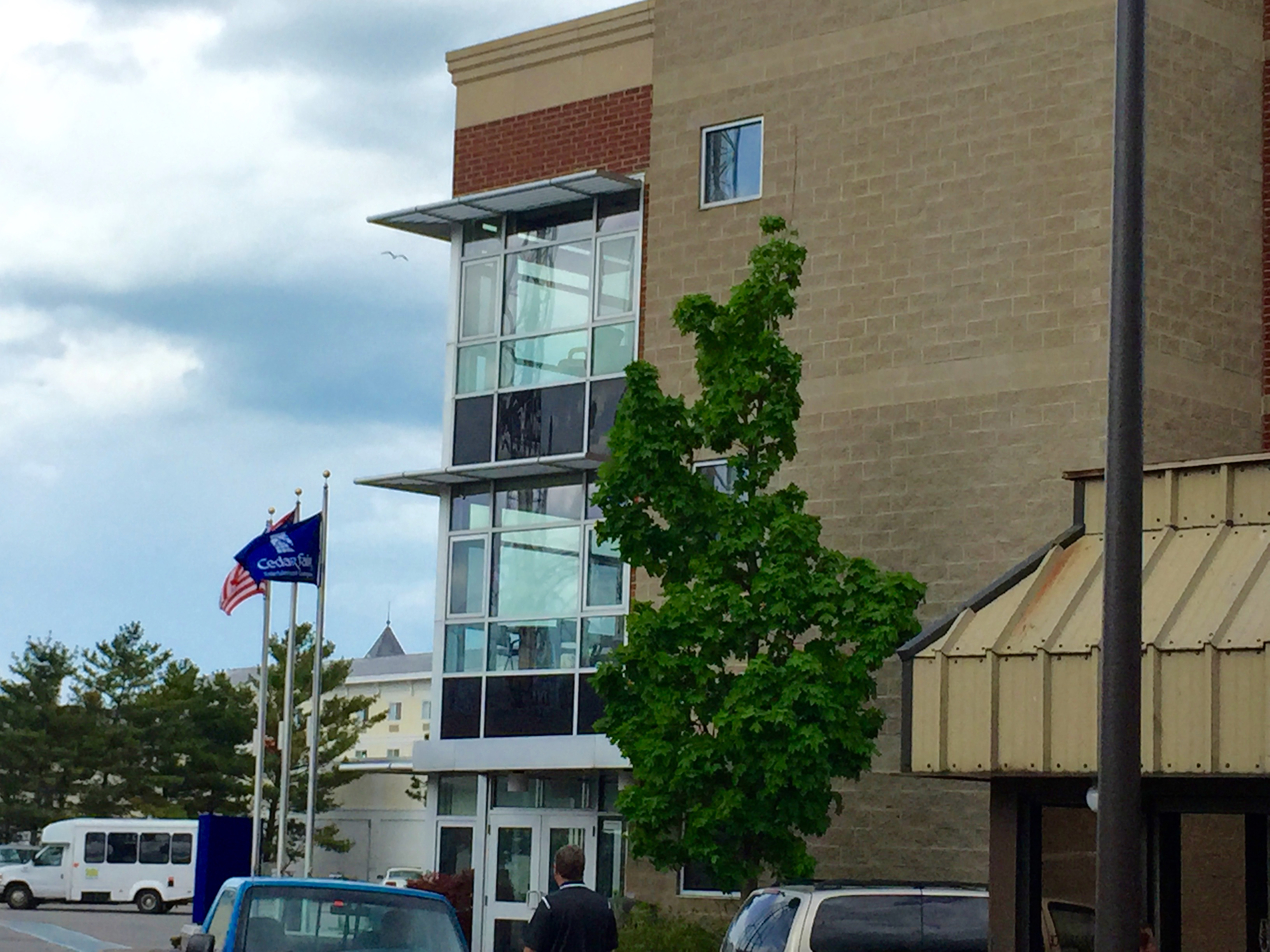
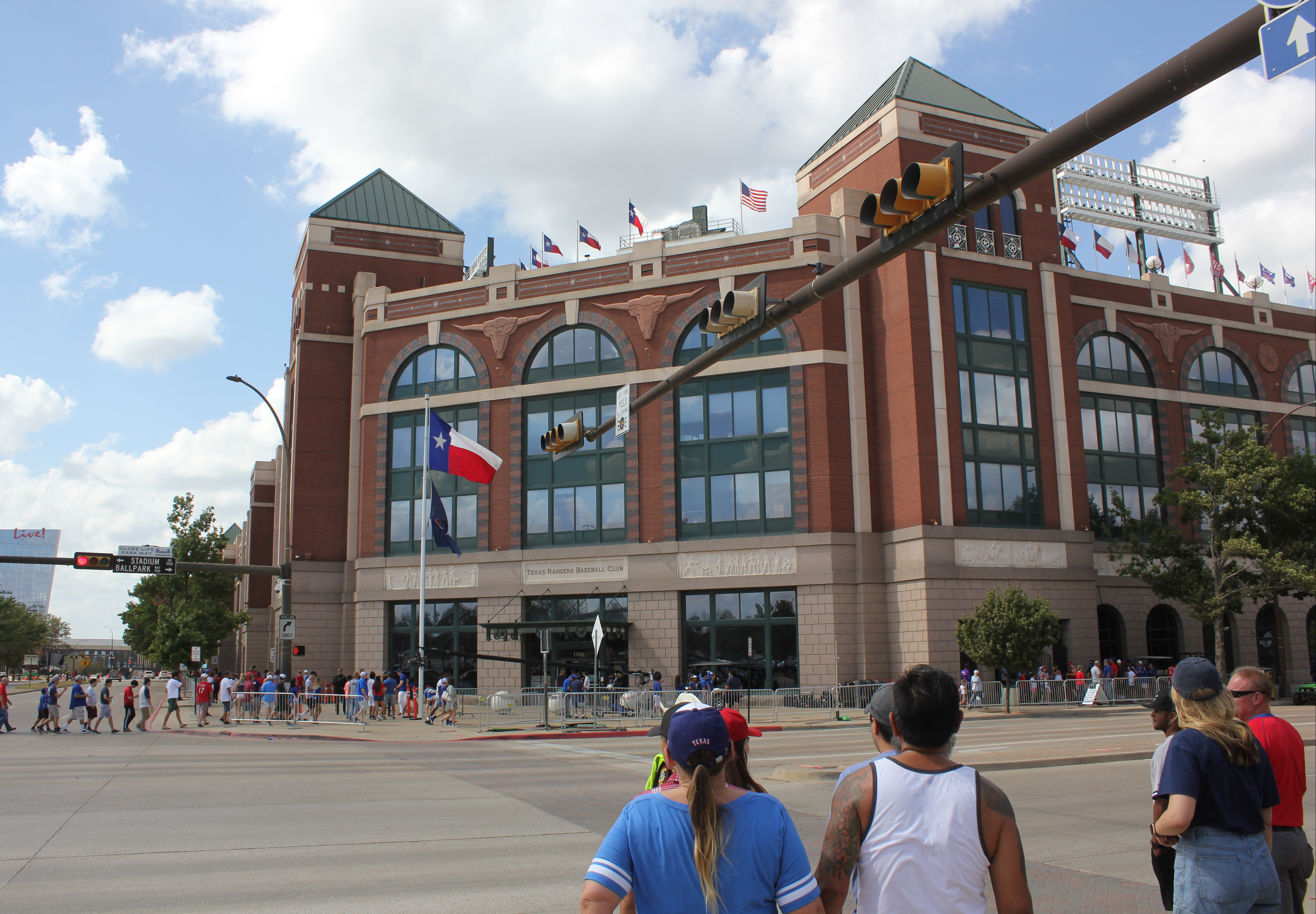
The headquarters of Cedar Fair (top) and Six Flags (bottom) prior to the 2024 merger.

Following initial contact by Cedar Fair in July 2023 and subsequent negotiations, longtime competitors Cedar Fair and Six Flags announced a merger on November 2, 2023. The announcement came at a time when amusement parks struggled to raise attendance after the COVID-19 pandemic, citing the need for financial stability, cost efficiency, and to compete with destination theme parks. Both companies anticipated US$120 million in cost synergies within two years following the merger's completion. Including debt, it would form an enterprise value of US$8 billion, creating a portfolio of 27 amusement parks, 15 water parks, with 9 resort properties, making the newly formed company the largest amusement park operator in North America.

Described as a "merger of equals", Cedar Fair shareholders would become majority owners, owning a 51.2% stake in the new company, while Six Flags shareholders would own a 48.8% stake. The merger was executed as an all-stock transaction: each Cedar Fair share was exchanged for one share in the new company, while each Six Flags share was exchanged for 0.58 shares. It was structured through a newly formed holding company named CopperSteel HoldCo, Inc., which both companies would merge into. Upon completion, Cedar Fair and Six Flags would dissolve, and CopperSteel HoldCo, Inc. was to be renamed to Six Flags Entertainment Corporation, trading under Cedar Fair's ticker symbol, FUN, on the New York Stock Exchange.

==== Approval ====
The board of directors of both companies had approved the merger at the time of initial announcement. The United States Department of Justice (DOJ) launched an antitrust review process of the merger on January 22, 2024, and issued a second request for additional information from both companies. On January 25, 2024, the Mexican Federal Competition Commission approved the merger. Six Flags shareholders overwhelmingly voted to approve the merger on March 12, 2024, with approximately 80% of votes cast in favor. The DOJ gave its approval on June 26, 2024, allowing the companies to finalize the merger, which was completed on July 1, 2024.

==== Opposition ====
Immediately after the merger's announcement, activist investment firm Land & Buildings Investment Management, which held a 1% stake in Six Flags, opposed the merger, stating that the deal "does not maximize value for all shareholders."

Since the merger was structured so that Cedar Fair unitholders would hold a 51.2% majority, it did not require a vote by Cedar Fair unitholders. In December 2023, investment firm Neuberger Berman, which held a 3% stake in Cedar Fair, accused the companies of purposefully structuring the deal so that Cedar Fair unitholders were disenfranchised, asserting that the merger would not be approved if Cedar Fair unitholders were allowed to vote.

=== 2024: Immediate post-merger integration ===
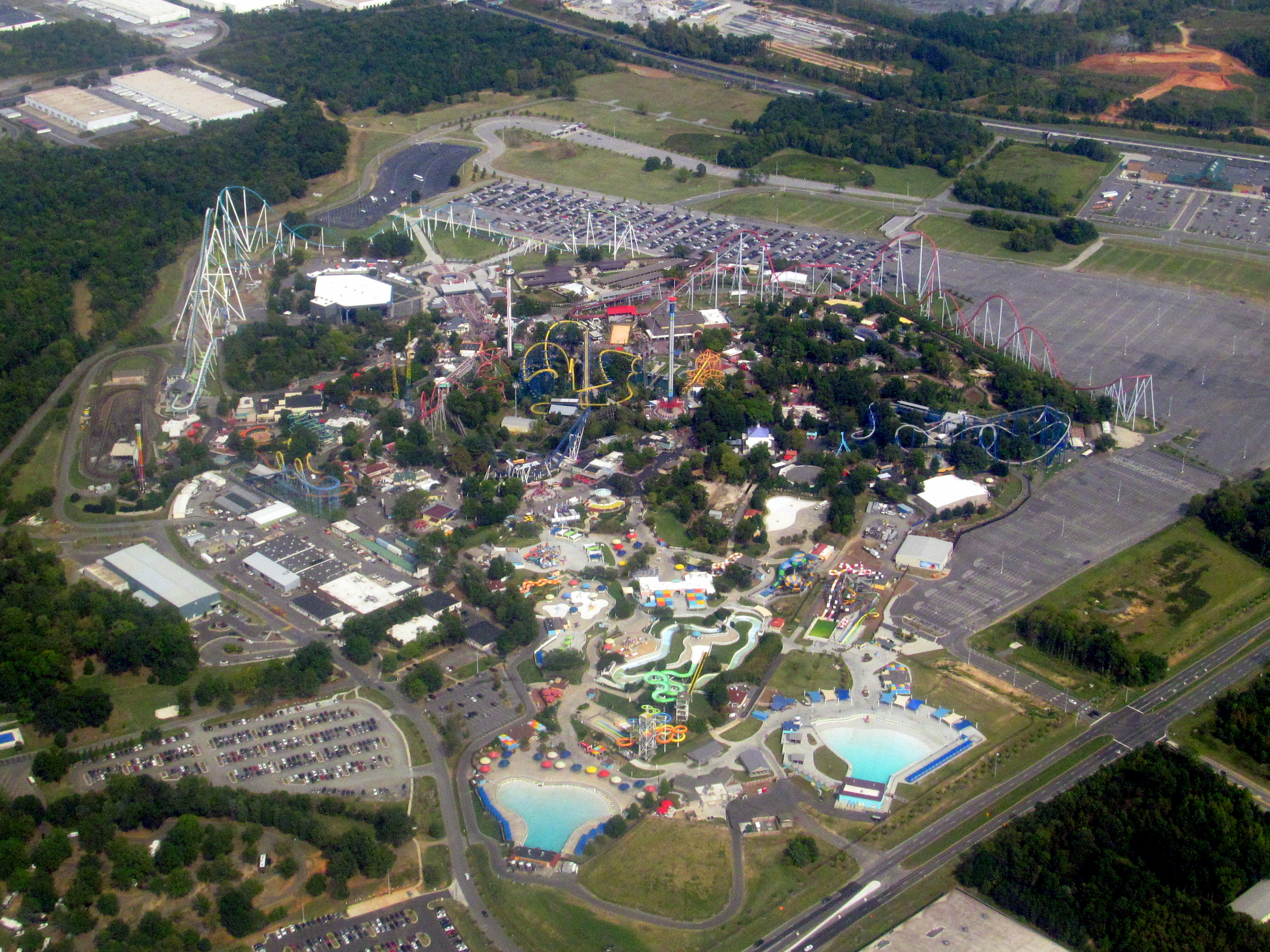
The company's headquarters were relocated five miles northeast of its Carowinds park (pictured) in Charlotte, North Carolina.

After the merger's completion on July 1, 2024, the president and CEO of Cedar Fair, Richard Zimmerman, became president and CEO of the new combined company. Selim Bassoul, the president and CEO of the former Six Flags company, became the executive chairman of the company's board of directors. The combined company's headquarters was relocated to Charlotte, North Carolina, five miles northeast of its Carowinds park, with significant administrative and financial operations based at Cedar Fair's former headquarters in Sandusky, Ohio. Cedar Fair had held significant administrative offices in Charlotte, North Carolina, prior to the merger. Six Flags clarified at the time of merger that the company did not anticipate making any major changes at the park-level and that all properties would retain their pre-merger names. Stocks for both Cedar Fair and the former Six Flags company ceased trading on the New York Stock Exchange, and the newly formed entity commenced trading on July 2, 2024 under the ticker symbol FUN.

In late-2024, Six Flags outlined plans for a portfolio optimization in the company, which may include closing or selling off some of its locations. The company filed plans with the United States Securities and Exchange Commission (SEC) on December 17, 2024, that it would acquire the remaining limited partnership units of Six Flags Over Georgia, Hurricane Harbor Atlanta, and Six Flags White Water by January 12, 2027. The transaction would cost US$332.6 million, and would increase Six Flags' ownership of the three parks from 31.5% to full ownership.

=== 2025–present: Corporate restructuring and portfolio optimization ===
On February 10, 2025, Six Flags and Qiddiya Investment Company announced that it had signed a management services agreement to provide operational support and brand licensing to two theme parks in the Qiddiya City megaproject in Riyadh Province, Saudi Arabia. These parks would be the Six Flags Qiddiya City theme park and Aquarabia water park.

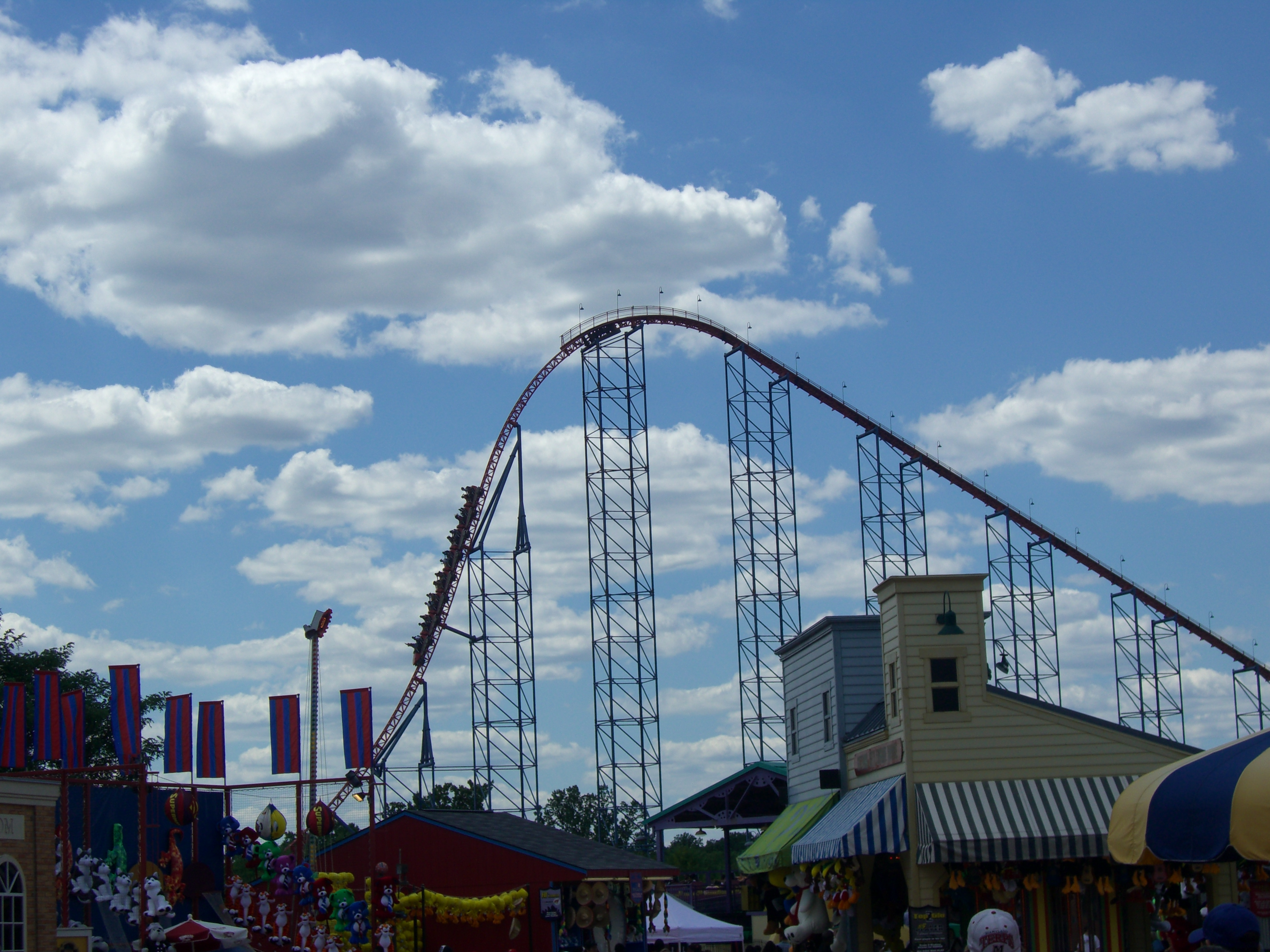
Six Flags America in Woodmore, Maryland, permanently closed on November 2, 2025.

On May 1, 2025, the company announced it would permanently close the Six Flags America theme park and its accompanying water park, Hurricane Harbor Maryland, in Woodmore, Maryland. The company cited that the parks were "not a strategic fit with the company's long term plan," and that the property would be redeveloped. Hurricane Harbor Maryland closed on September 6, 2025, and Six Flags America closed on November 2, 2025. In late-May 2025, Six Flags announced plans to reduce 10% of its full-time employees, equating to approximately 500 employees. The layoffs included eliminating the park president role at all of its 27 amusement parks as the company moved to a regional operating structure, completing these layoffs by June.

On August 6, 2025, Six Flags announced that President and CEO Richard Zimmerman would step down by the end of the year. Later, on October 10, 2025, it was announced that Bassoul, executive chairman, would step down by the end of 2025, but would stay to consult for the upcoming Six Flags Qiddiya City. John Reilly, a former executive at Palace Entertainment, Parques Reunidos, and SeaWorld Entertainment, assumed the president and CEO position effective December 8, 2025, replacing Zimmerman. Marilyn Spiegel, who served as a board member since 2023 for both the former Six Flags company and current company, replaced Bassoul as a non-executive chair on January 1, 2026.

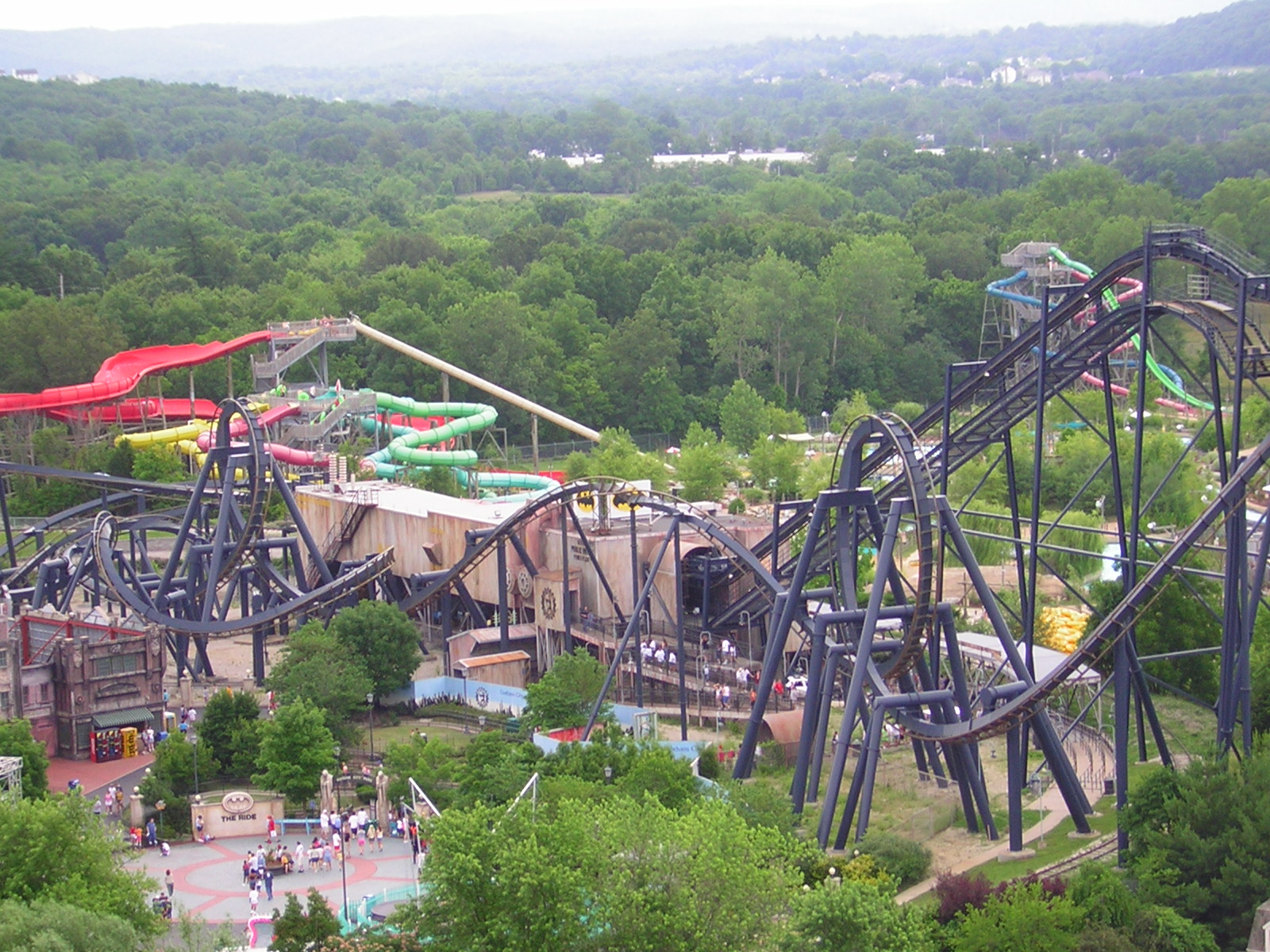
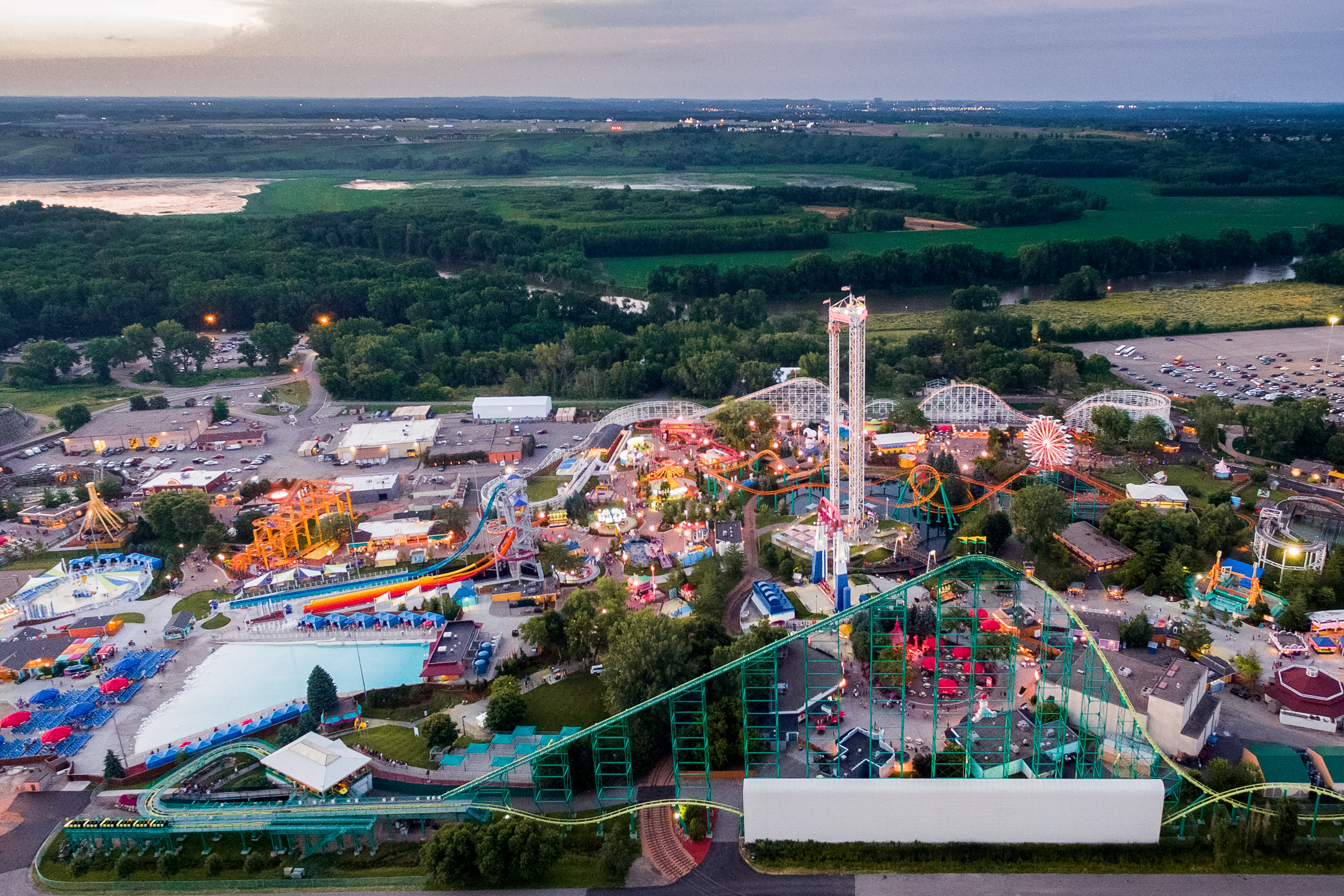
Six Flags St. Louis (top) and Valleyfair (bottom) were among the six U.S.-based parks sold to EPR Properties on April 6, 2026. These two parks were original parks within their legacy chain.

The company announced on January 5, 2026, that it did not intend to acquire its remaining stake in Six Flags Over Texas, citing "the contractual terms do not currently align with [its] capital allocation priorities."

On March 5, 2026, Six Flags announced that it would divest seven of its theme parks, selling the parks to EPR Properties for US$331 million. These parks include Valleyfair, Worlds of Fun, Michigan's Adventure, Schlitterbahn Galveston, Six Flags St. Louis, Six Flags Great Escape, and La Ronde. The sale of these parks follows the registration of the "Enchanted Parks" trademarks to the United States Patent and Trademark Office in early-January 2026; Enchanted Parks will partner with EPR to operate six of the parks, while La Ronde Operations will operate La Ronde. The sale of the United States parks was completed on April 6, 2026, while the sale of La Ronde was completed on May 14, 2026.

In March 2026, activist investor Jana Partners, which held an approximately 9% economic stake in Six Flags, sent a letter to the company’s board of directors calling for the exploration of a sale and the immediate replacement of board chair Marilyn Spiegel. The firm, led by managing partner Scott Ostfeld, cited an “alarming pattern of board dysfunction and disjointed decision-making”, while expressing support for newly appointed CEO John Reilly. Jana argued that engaging with a known buyer interest was in the best interest of shareholders. Richard Haddrill became the company’s executive chairman on March 25, 2026, with Spiegel becoming the lead independent director. After laying off 27 park presidents in 2025, the company reversed its decision in mid-April 2026, choosing to reinstate the role at 10 parks in "key markets."

On August 25, 2026, Six Flags announced it would relocate its headquarters from Charlotte, North Carolina, to Choctaw Stadium in Arlington, Texas. Choctaw Stadium was the headquarters for the former Six Flags company from 2020 up until the 2024 merger with the facilities continuing to be used as a corporate office following the merger. The relocation will be completed by March 2027. In addition to its headquarters in Arlington, Six Flags will continue to retain a corporate office at the former Cedar Fair headquarters in Sandusky, Ohio.

As of 2026, Six Flags operates 34 properties: 20 amusement parks and 14 separately-gated water parks, with nine on-site resorts in North America. Additionally, the company licenses and manages two parks within the Qiddiya City megaproject in Saudi Arabia.

== Properties ==
=== Amusement parks ===
The following table only includes main amusement parks counted towards Six Flags' total property count.

Former Cedar Fair properties Original Six Flags (1961–2024) properties Tierco / Premier Parks properties, merged into Six Flags in 1998 Fun Times Park property, acquired by Premier Parks and merged into Six Flags Schlitterbahn property, acquired by Cedar Fair and merged into Six Flags

Name	Location	Year opened	Notes	Brief history
California's Great America	Santa Clara, California	1976	Land owned by Prologis; the park is planned to close on September 6th 2027. Includes the South Bay Shores water park.	One of the two original Great America parks founded by the Marriott Corporation. Acquired by Cedar Fair as part of the Paramount Parks purchase
Canada's Wonderland	Vaughan, Ontario	1981	Includes the Splash Works water park.	Developed by the Taft Broadcasting Corporation. Acquired by Cedar Fair as part of the Paramount Parks purchase
Carowinds	Charlotte, North Carolina	1973	Includes the Carolina Harbor water park.	Founded by Earl Patterson Hall but later sold to Taft Broadcasting Corporation. Acquired by Cedar Fair as part of the Paramount Parks purchase
Cedar Point	Sandusky, Ohio	1870	Includes five resort properties and the Cedar Point Sports Center sports complex facility. Located adjacent to the separately-gated water park Cedar Point Shores, which is counted as a separate property.	The original Cedar Fair property traces its history back to the late 1800s
Dorney Park	Allentown, Pennsylvania	1884	Includes the WildWater Kingdom water park.	Dorney Park traces its history back to the late 1800s. It was the first acquisition of the Cedar Fair company, which they got in 1992.
Frontier City	Oklahoma City, Oklahoma	1958	Land owned by EPR Properties; operated by Six Flags under lease. Includes the Wild West Water Works water park.	The original Tierco park (later renamed Premier Parks)
Kings Dominion	Doswell, Virginia	1975	Includes the Soak City water park.	This is the second Taft Broadcasting Corporation-built park. Acquired by Cedar Fair as part of the Paramount Parks purchase
Kings Island	Mason, Ohio	1972	Includes the Soak City water park.	The first Taft Broadcasting Corporation-built park, it replaced Cincinnati's Coney Island. Acquired by Cedar Fair as part of the Paramount Parks
Knott's Berry Farm	Buena Park, California	1920	Includes the Knott's Hotel resort. Adjacent to the separately-gated water park Knott's Soak City, which is counted as a separate property.	When Cedar Fair acquired this park, it gave them the rights to the Peanuts IP
Six Flags Darien Lake	Darien, New York	1981	Owned by EPR Properties; operated by Six Flags under lease. Includes the Hurricane Harbor water park and Six Flags Darien Lake lodging facilities.	Originally Darien Lake.
Six Flags Discovery Kingdom	Vallejo, California	1968	—	Originally Marine World, Six Flags got the park as part of the Premier Parks acquisition.
Six Flags Fiesta Texas	San Antonio, Texas	1992	Includes the Hurricane Harbor San Antonio water park.	Built by Gaylord and owned by USAA. Leased to Six Flags in 1996 before being formally acquired by the company in 1998.
Six Flags Great Adventure	Jackson, New Jersey	1974	Includes the Savannah Sunset Resort. Located adjacent to the separately-gated water park Hurricane Harbor New Jersey and Six Flags Wild Safari safari park; Hurricane Harbor New Jersey and Wild Safari are counted as separate properties.	Originally known as Great Adventure.
Six Flags Great America	Gurnee, Illinois	1976	Located adjacent to the separately-gated water park Hurricane Harbor Chicago, which is counted as a separate property.	One of the two original Great America parks founded by the Marriott corporation.
Six Flags Magic Mountain	Valencia, California	1971	Located adjacent to the separately-gated water park Hurricane Harbor Los Angeles, which is counted as a separate property.	Originally known as Magic Mountain.
Six Flags México	Mexico City, Mexico	1982	Land owned by the Federal District of Mexico City; operated by Six Flags under lease.	Originally known as Reino Aventura.
Six Flags New England	Agawam, Massachusetts	1870	Includes the Hurricane Harbor water park.	Originally known as Riverside Park.
Six Flags Over Georgia	Austell, Georgia	1967	Owned by Six Flags Over Georgia Ltd., a limited partnership; managed and operated by Six Flags, of which they will take full ownership by January 2027. Includes the Hurricane Harbor water park.	The second Six Flags park.
Six Flags Over Texas	Arlington, Texas	1961	Owned by Texas Flags Ltd., a limited partnership; majority-owned, managed, and operated by Six Flags. Located adjacent to the separately-gated Hurricane Harbor Arlington water park, which is counted as a separate property.	The original Six Flags park, founded by Angus Wynne

Interactive map of North American Six Flags parks.
Amusement parks Stand-alone water parks
Interactive map of non-North American Six Flags parks.

=== Water parks ===
The following table only includes separately-gated water parks counted towards Six Flags' total property count.

Name	Location	Year opened	Notes
Cedar Point Shores	Sandusky, Ohio	1988	Located adjacent to Cedar Point.
Knott's Soak City	Buena Park, California	2000	Located adjacent to Knott's Berry Farm.
Schlitterbahn New Braunfels	New Braunfels, Texas	1979	Located approximately 35 miles from Six Flags Fiesta Texas.
Six Flags Hurricane Harbor Arlington	Arlington, Texas	1983	Located across Interstate 30 from Six Flags Over Texas.
Six Flags Hurricane Harbor Concord	Concord, California	1995	Land owned by EPR Properties; operated by Six Flags under lease. Located approximately 15 miles from Six Flags Discovery Kingdom. Originally Waterworld USA Concord
Six Flags Hurricane Harbor Chicago	Gurnee, Illinois	2005	Located adjacent to Six Flags Great America.
Six Flags Hurricane Harbor Los Angeles	Valencia, California	1995	Located adjacent to Six Flags Magic Mountain.
Six Flags Hurricane Harbor New Jersey	Jackson, New Jersey	2000	Located within the Six Flags Great Adventure Resort.
Six Flags Hurricane Harbor Oaxtepec	Oaxtepec, Mexico	2017	Land owned by the Mexican Social Security Institute; operated by Six Flags under lease.
Six Flags Hurricane Harbor Oklahoma City	Oklahoma City, Oklahoma	1981	Land owned by EPR Properties; operated by Six Flags under lease. Located approximately 15 miles from Frontier City.
Six Flags Hurricane Harbor Phoenix	Phoenix, Arizona	2009	Land owned by EPR Properties; operated by Six Flags under lease.
Six Flags Hurricane Harbor Rockford	Cherry Valley, Illinois	1984	Land owned by the Rockford Park District; operated by Six Flags under lease.
Six Flags Hurricane Harbor Splashtown	Spring, Texas	1984	Land owned by EPR Properties; operated by Six Flags under lease.
Six Flags White Water	Marietta, Georgia	1983	Owned by Six Flags Over Georgia Ltd., a limited partnership; managed and operated by Six Flags, of which they will take full ownership by January 2027. Located approximately 15 miles from Six Flags Over Georgia.

=== Resorts ===
Name	Location	Year opened	Notes
Castaway Bay	Sandusky, Ohio	2004	Located within Cedar Point Resorts, containing an indoor water park.
Cedar Point Express Hotel	Sandusky, Ohio	2017	Located within Cedar Point Resorts, replaced an older hotel called "Breakers Express".
Hotel Breakers	Sandusky, Ohio	1905	Located within Cedar Point Resorts.
Knott's Hotel	Buena Park, California	1968	Located near Knott's Berry Farm.
Lighthouse Point	Sandusky, Ohio	2001	Located within Cedar Point Resorts.
Sawmill Creek Resort	Huron, Ohio	1972	Located within Cedar Point Resorts, eight miles from the park.
Six Flags Savannah Sunset Resort & Spa	Jackson, New Jersey	2024	Located within Six Flags Great Adventure Resorts.
Six Flags Darien Lake Hotel & Campground	Darien, New York	1954	Located across from Six Flags Darien Lake, containing a hotel named Lodge on the Lake, a campground with cabins, guest houses, and rentable RVs; Darien Square, and Darien Lake Performing Arts Center. Like with the park itself, it's owned by EPR Properties.
The Resorts at Schlitterbahn New Braunfels	New Braunfels, Texas	1979	Located within Schlitterbahn New Braunfels.

=== Licensed and managed parks ===
Name	Location	Year Opened	Note
Six Flags Qiddiya City	Qiddiya City, Saudi Arabia	2025	Owned by the Qiddiya Investment Company; licensed and operated by Six Flags under a management services agreement.
Aquarabia Qiddiya City	Qiddiya City, Saudi Arabia	2026	Owned by the Qiddiya Investment Company; licensed and operated by Six Flags under a management services agreement.

=== Former properties ===
Name	Location	Year closed/sold	Fate
Six Flags America	Woodmore, Maryland	2025	Permanently closed on November 2, 2025, including the Hurricane Harbor Maryland water park.
Michigan's Adventure	Muskegon, Michigan	2026	Sold to EPR Properties on April 6, 2026, with Enchanted Parks as its operator. The WildWater Adventure water park was included in this sale.
Schlitterbahn Galveston	Galveston, Texas	2026	Sold to EPR Properties on April 6, 2026, with Enchanted Parks as its operator.
Six Flags Great Escape	Queensbury, New York	2026	Sold to EPR Properties on April 6, 2026, with Enchanted Parks as its operator. The Hurricane Harbor water park and Six Flags Great Escape Lodge hotel were included in this sale. The park removed the "Six Flags" suffix from its name in June 2026 and got a new logo in October 2026.
Six Flags St. Louis	Eureka, Missouri	2026	Sold to EPR Properties on April 6, 2026, with Enchanted Parks as its operator. The Hurricane Harbor St. Louis water park was included in this sale. It was renamed to Mid America Adventure in August 2026.
Valleyfair	Shakopee, Minnesota	2026	Sold to EPR Properties on April 6, 2026, with Enchanted Parks as its operator. The Soak City water park was also included and was renamed to Superior Shores shortly after the sale, although the decision was made before the sale was decided on.
Worlds of Fun	Kansas City, Missouri	2026	Sold to EPR Properties on April 6, 2026, with Enchanted Parks as its operator. The Oceans of Fun water park was included in this sale.
La Ronde	Montréal, Quebec	2026	Sold to EPR Properties on May 14, 2026, with Premier Parks, LLC as its operator.

== Corporate affairs ==
Six Flags is a public company, trading under the ticker symbol "FUN" on the New York Stock Exchange. It is headquartered in Charlotte, North Carolina, and maintains significant administrative offices at the Cedar Point amusement park in Sandusky, Ohio. The company is planned to relocate its headquarters to Arlington, Texas, by March 2027.

=== Leadership ===
==== Board of directors ====
As of May 26, 2026, the current Six Flags board of directors are:

- Richard Haddrill – executive chairman
- Marilyn Spiegel (Note: Director from the former Six Flags company prior to the 2024 merger.) – lead independent director
- John Reilly – president and CEO of Six Flags
- Jonathan Brudnick
- Sandra Cochran
- Michael Colglazier
- Felipe Dutra
- Steven Hoffman
- Chieh Huang
- Rehan Jaffer

==== Executives ====
As of July 15, 2026, the current Six Flags executive team consists of:

- John Reilly – president and chief executive officer
- Mark Pauls – chief operating officer
- Ash Walia – chief financial officer
- Christopher Bennett – chief legal and compliance officer
- Amy Martin Ziegenfuss – chief marketing officer
- Dave Hoffman (Note: Held the same executive position at Cedar Fair prior to the 2024 merger.) – chief accounting officer
- Ty Tastepe – chief digital officer
- Seenu Sarma – chief procurement officer

=== Ownership ===
As of March 31, 2026, the ten largest shareholders are:

Shareholder	Shares
BlackRock	15,161,824
UBS	9,114,678
Darlington Partners Capital Management	8,700,000
Morgan Stanley	5,924,427
Vanguard Portfolio Management	5,140,845
Sachem Head Capital Management	5,030,000
Dendur Capital	4,953,000
H Partners Management	4,650,000
Vanguard Capital Management	4,207,390
Jana Partners	4,116,009

=== Finances ===
Sales by business (2025)
Business	Share
Admissions	51.1%
Food, merchandise, games	33.5%
Accommodations, add-ons, and other	15.4%

Year-end financials (US$)
Year	Revenue (in billions)	Net income (in billions)	Total assets (in billions)	Long-term debt (in billions)	Price per share	Operating parks	Employees
2024	2.71	−0.23	9.13	4.72	48.19	42	98,000
2025	3.10	−1.60	7.80	5.17	15.34	41	95,225

== Attendance ==
=== Company attendance ===
The following figures refer to the Themed Entertainment Association's amusement park operator rankings by attendance.

Year	Rank	Attendance	Ref.
2024	5	50,300,000	

=== Top ranked parks ===
The following figures refer to Six Flags parks that ranked among the top 20 most attended amusement parks in North America per year, as reported by the Themed Entertainment Association.

North America rank	Park	Attendance (in millions)
2024
10	Knott's Berry Farm	4.503
14	Cedar Point	3.780
15	Kings Island	3.465
16	Six Flags Magic Mountain	3.317
17	Canada's Wonderland	3.264
19	Six Flags Great America	3.045

== Business model ==
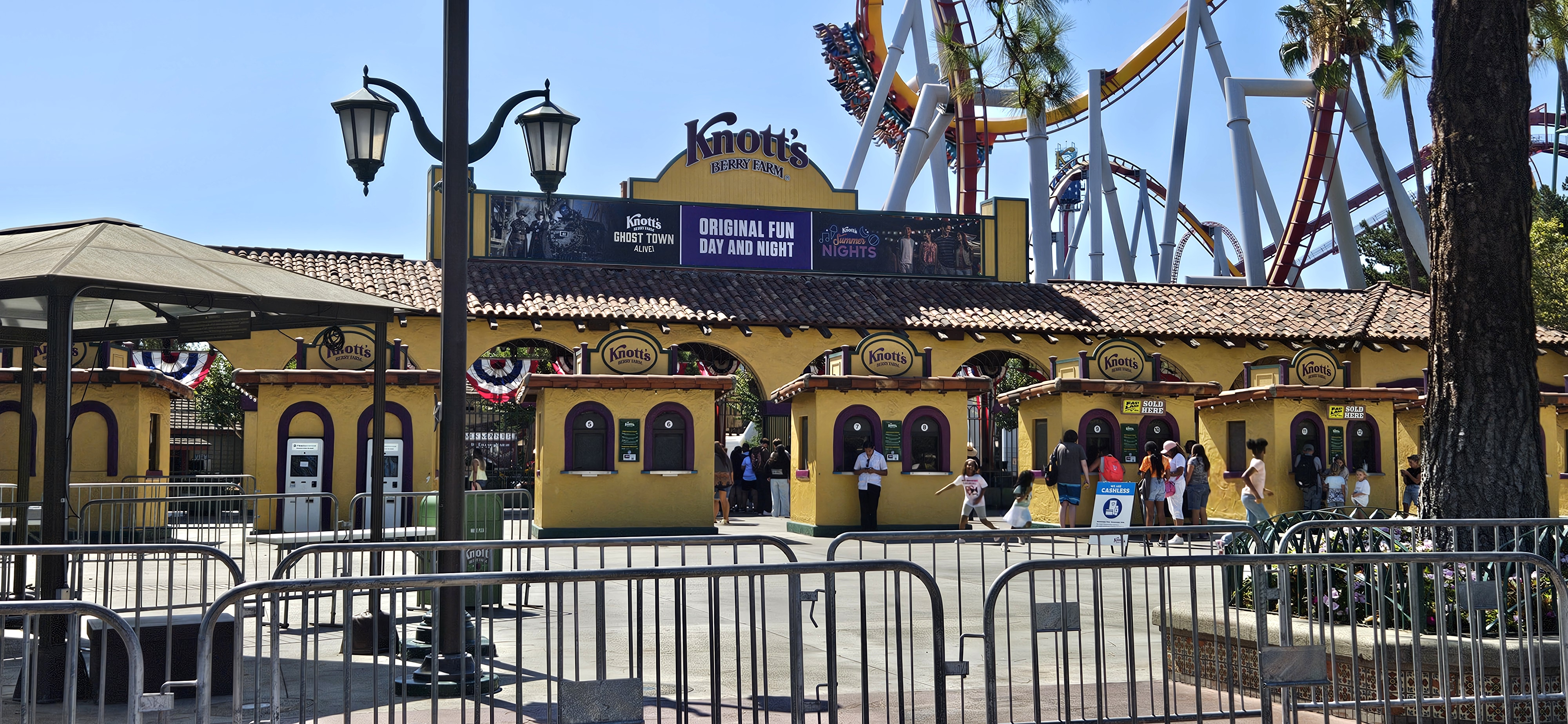
Admission gates to Knott's Berry Farm in Buena Park, California in 2025.

Six Flags generates revenue through three primary sources: park admissions (51.1%), in-park spending (33.5%), and other revenue (15.4%). (Note: Attributed to Six Flags' Form 10-K for the 2025 fiscal year.) The company offers season passes, usually priced lower than competitors. These passes are priced based on a park's market and operating season, as well as monthly memberships at legacy Six Flags parks. While per-capita revenue from season passholders is lower per visit, their total annual spend is higher. Six Flags has emphasized increasing attendance volume and in-park spending frequency to increase revenue.

Additional revenue sources come from special events such as the Halloween events Fright Fest and Haunt, as well as winter events Holiday in the Park and Winterfest. Six Flags' Halloween events utilize popular intellectual properties to increase attendance. A prevalent paid add-on is Fast Lane, an expedited queuing system, offered at the company's parks. Guests pay an additional fee to access either a shorter queue or a virtual queue on select attractions.

== Marketing and licensing ==
=== Marketing efforts ===
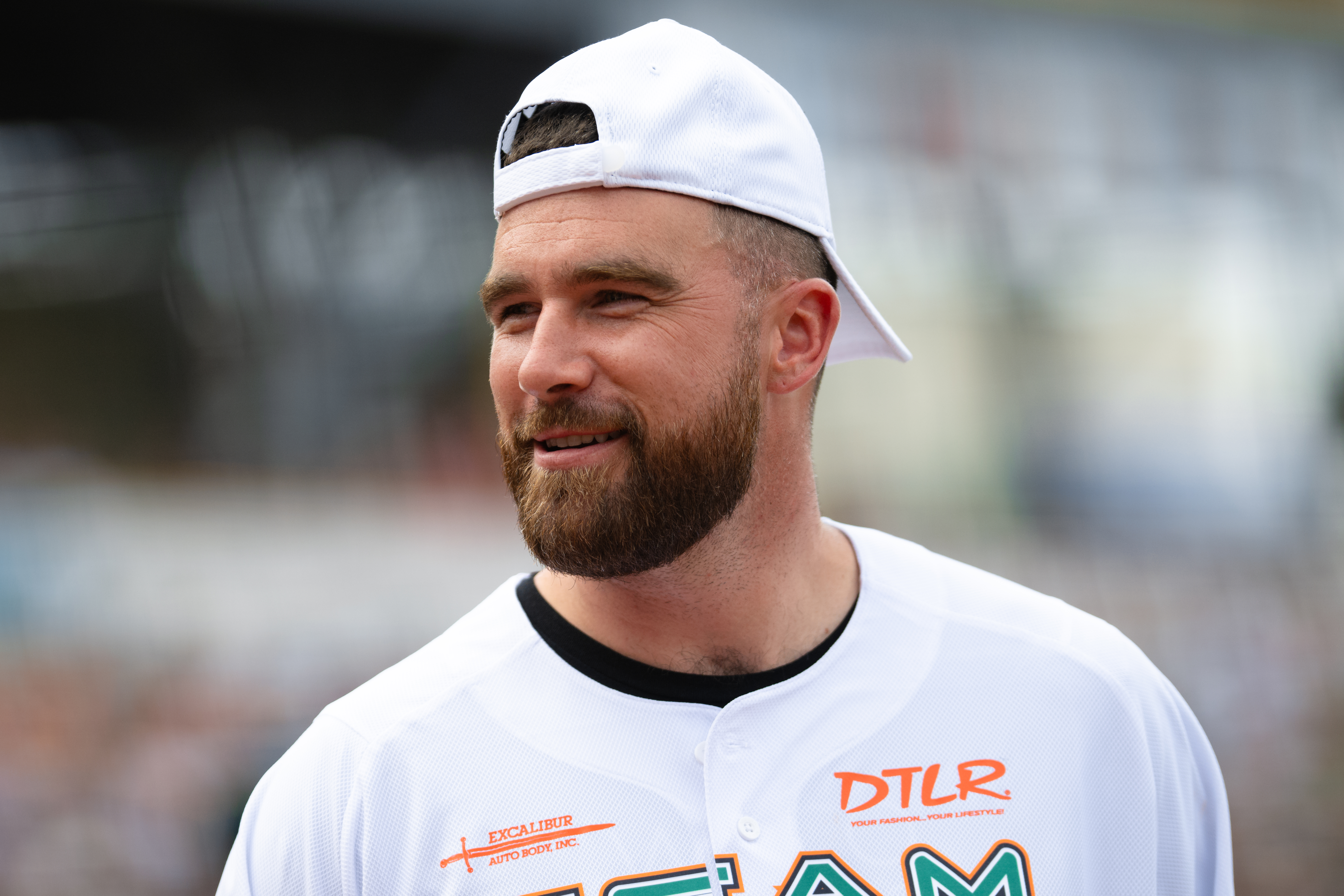
Travis Kelce serves as Six Flags' brand ambassador.

In April 2025, Six Flags launched its first post-merger national brand campaign "We're Serious About Fun." The new ad campaign introduces a new mascot character, the Funsultant, known for deadpan delivery. It was developed by the creative agency The Marketing Arm (TMA), and was launched for television, digital, out-of-home, social media and email.

American football player Travis Kelce became Six Flags' brand ambassador in March 2026, partnering with the company on marketing efforts. Kelce had partnered with activist investor firm Jana Partners in October 2025, which acquired a 9% stake in Six Flags.

=== Licensing and partnerships ===
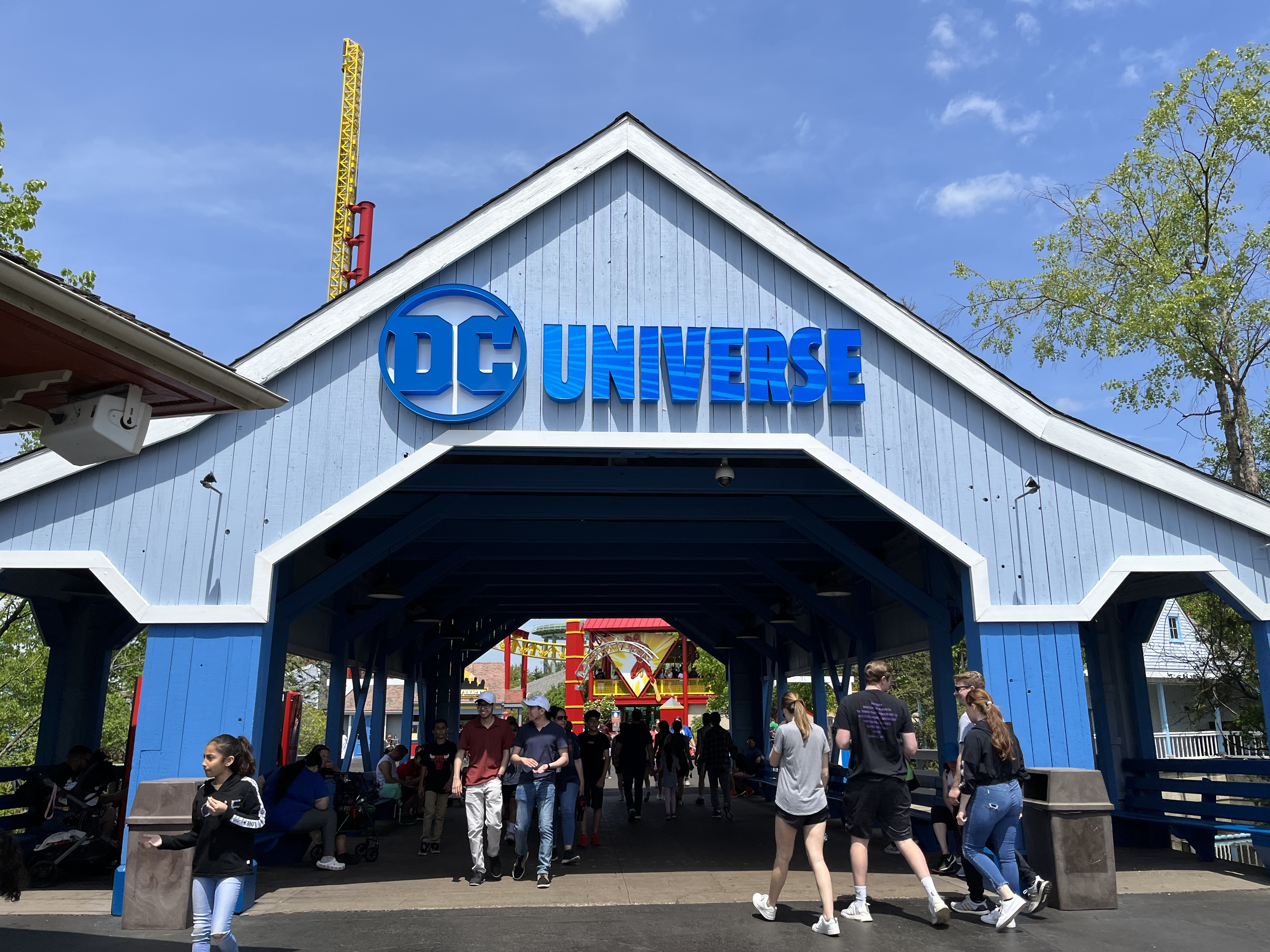
The DC Universe themed area at Six Flags Great America.

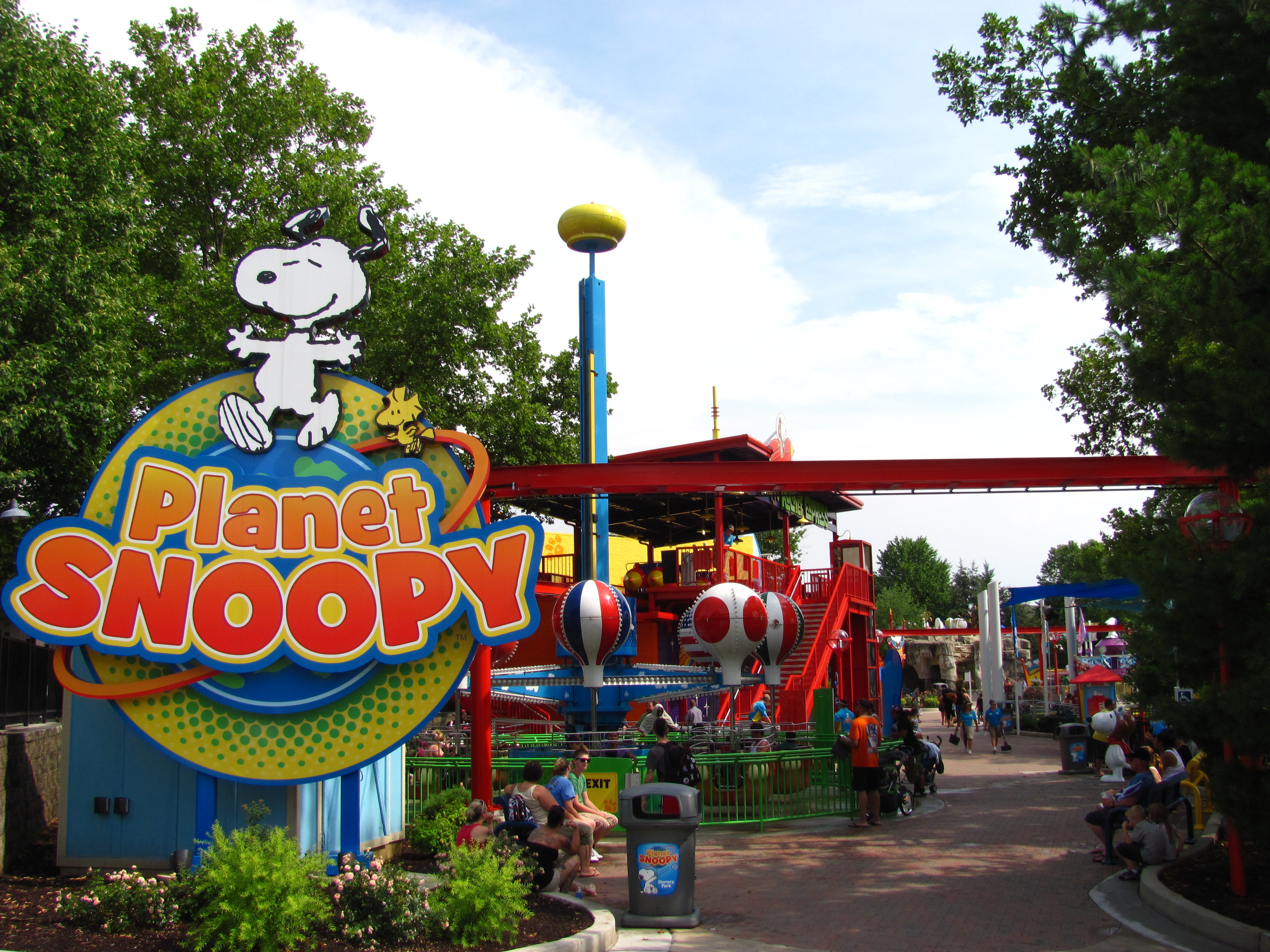
The Planet Snoopy themed area at Dorney Park.

Six Flags currently holds theme park rights to two intellectual properties: Warner Bros. and Peanuts. The company's agreement with Warner Bros. grants access to use Looney Tunes and DC Comics properties in its theme parks in North America, with the exception of the Las Vegas metropolitan area and Florida. The Peanuts intellectual properties are licensed for use in the United States and Canada at select legacy Cedar Fair parks only; (Note: The legacy Cedar Fair parks that use Peanuts characters are: California's Great America, Canada's Wonderland, Carowinds, Cedar Point, Dorney Park, Kings Dominion, Kings Island, and Knott's Berry Farm.) Six Flags renewed its licensing agreement with Peanuts Worldwide through 2030.

Six Flags maintains a partnership with online travel agency Tripster to provide its white-label booking system to provide park admission and lodging package bundles at its parks, branded as the Hotel Partner Program by Six Flags.

The Six Flags brand is licensed to the Qiddiya Investment Company for Six Flags Qiddiya City, a park that Six Flags operates and manages. Additionally, EPR Properties retains access to use the Six Flags brands at the parks it has acquired from Six Flags for the 2026 season.

Other in-park partnerships include food vendors such as Blue Bunny Ice Cream, Coca-Cola, Frito-Lay, The Icee Company, and Mars Inc. Six Flags maintains multiple partnerships with on-ride photo vendors, with Pomvom operating at legacy Six Flags parks and Colorvision International at legacy Cedar Fair parks, with the exception of Dorney Park; Dorney Park's photo vendor is Kaman's Art Shoppes. The company's technology provider is Accesso, utilizing the Accesso Passport ticketing suite for e-commerce.

Six Flags maintains an educational partnership with Bowling Green State University through the Six Flags Resort and Attractions Management (RAAM) program, which offers a Bachelor of Science in resort and attraction management. Originally launched by Cedar Fair in 2020 as the Cedar Fair Resort and Attractions Management, it was renamed following the 2024 merger.

== See also ==
- Incidents at Six Flags parks
