= Soak City (Kings Dominion) =

Water park in Doswell, Virginia

- Location: Kings Dominion, Doswell, Virginia, United States
- Coordinates: 37°50′10.2″N 77°26′33.3″W
- Owner: Six Flags
- Opened: 1992
- Previous names: Hurricane Reef (1992–1998), WaterWorks (1999–2014)
- Operating season: May — September
- Area: 20-acre (81,000 m^{2})
- Pools: 3 pools
- Website: www.sixflags.com/kingsdominion/soak-city

Soak City is a water park owned by Six Flags Entertainment Corporation, located at the back of Kings Dominion in Doswell, Virginia. Tickets are included with admission to the main park.

== History ==
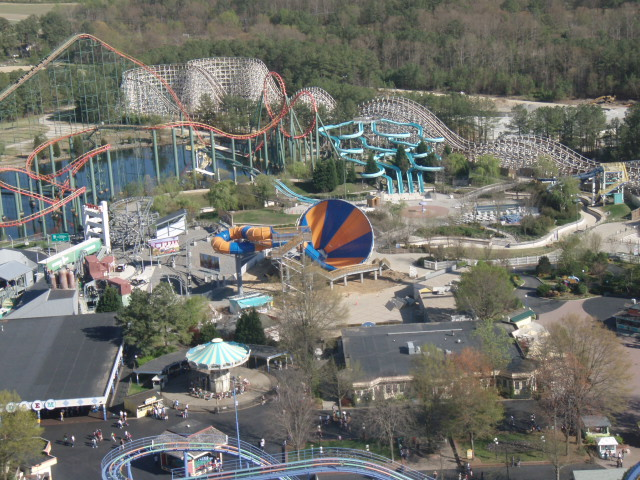

When the park debuted in 1992, it was originally named Hurricane Reef. In 1999, the water park was expanded and renamed WaterWorks and many of the attractions received new names. It has two sections, the Northside, formerly known as Hurricane Reef, and the Southside, which is the newer section of WaterWorks. The water parks at Kings Island and Carowinds were also known as WaterWorks for a period of time before being renamed Boomerang Bay.

In 2015, Kings Dominion announced that WaterWorks would undergo a major expansion and be renamed Soak City, a name that has been used for other Cedar Fair water parks. The expansion included a new slide complex called Hurricane Heights featuring three unique slides, a new children's area called Splash Island, and the removal of the Shoot the Curl speed slides. Tornado, a ProSlide Tornado slide, was removed at the start of the 2018 season. For the 2020 season, Soak City was scheduled to be expanded with the addition of Coconut Shores, a new sub-area located on the former site of Big Wave Bay. The opening of Coconut Shores was delayed until 2021 due to the COVID-19 pandemic. The area features Lighthouse Landing, a multi-story water play structure, and Sand Dune Lagoon, a children's wave pool.

== Slides and attractions ==
Name	Year opened	Description	Height Requirement	Rating
Aqua Blast	2015	An enclosed tube slide featuring four intense 360-degree loops across 450 feet of slide before being dropped into a splash pool. Part of Hurricane Heights.	48" And Over In Bare Feet (Purple, Black, and Orange Wristband)	5
Baja Bends	1992	A twisting fiberglass water slide which descends into a 42"-deep splash pool.	52" And Over In Bare Feet (Black and Orange Wristband)	4
FreeStylin'	1992	An inner tube ride in which guests experience a variety of curves and drops before splashing into a 42"-deep splash pool.	40" And Over In Bare Feet, between 40" & 52" must wear a life jacket	3
Lazy Rider	1992	A 1/4-mile lazy river that meanders through waterfalls and geysers.	Less than 42" In Bare Feet must be accompanied by a responsible person. Between 42 & 48" must wear a life jacket.	2
Lighthouse Landing	2021	A 45-foot tall multi-level play structure with 200 interactive elements, eight slides, net bridges, and two 423-gallon tipping buckets. Built on the former site of Big Wave Bay as part of Coconut Shores.	Over 40" for the slides over 8' in air; over 36" for the slides under 8' in air	2 (structure), 3 (slides)
Lil' Barefoot Beach	2000	A shallow play area for children	Under 54" In Bare Feet	1
Paradise Plunge	2015	AquaLaunch water slide where riders stand in a capsule and the floor drops out, sending them into a high-speed, almost vertical free fall and through a series of loops and s-curves in a translucent flume. Part of Hurricane Heights. Built by WhiteWater West.	48" And Over In Bare Feet	5
Pipeline Peak	2000	Four totally enclosed slides. Night Slider and Power Plunge are body slides beginning at the top of a 77-foot (23 m) platform. Rip Slide and Turbo Twister are inner tube slides starting from a 45-foot (14 m) platform.	48" And Over In Bare Feet	5
Sand Dune Lagoon	2021	A 3,000-square-foot miniature wave pool designed for families with small children which includes spraying fountains and a large waterfall. Built on the former site of Big Wave Bay as part of Coconut Shores.	Less than 42" must be accompanied by a responsible person. Between 42 & 48" must wear a life jacket.	3
Splash Island	2015	An expansive themed splash pad and activity area for children and families.	Under 54" In Bare Feet	1
Thunder Falls	2015	Inner tube slide on which riders are launched down a series of intense drops and turns. Part of Hurricane Heights.	48" And Over In Bare Feet	5
Tidal Wave Bay	2007	A 450,000-gallon wave pool.	Less than 42" must be accompanied by a responsible person; between 42 & 52" must wear a life jacket.	3
Zoom Flume	2007	Four riders at a time climb aboard a circular raft and careen down a curving and tilting flume.	42" And Over In Bare Feet	4

== See also ==
- List of Six Flags water parks
