= Cedar Point Shores =

Water park near Cedar Point

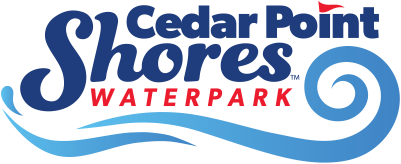

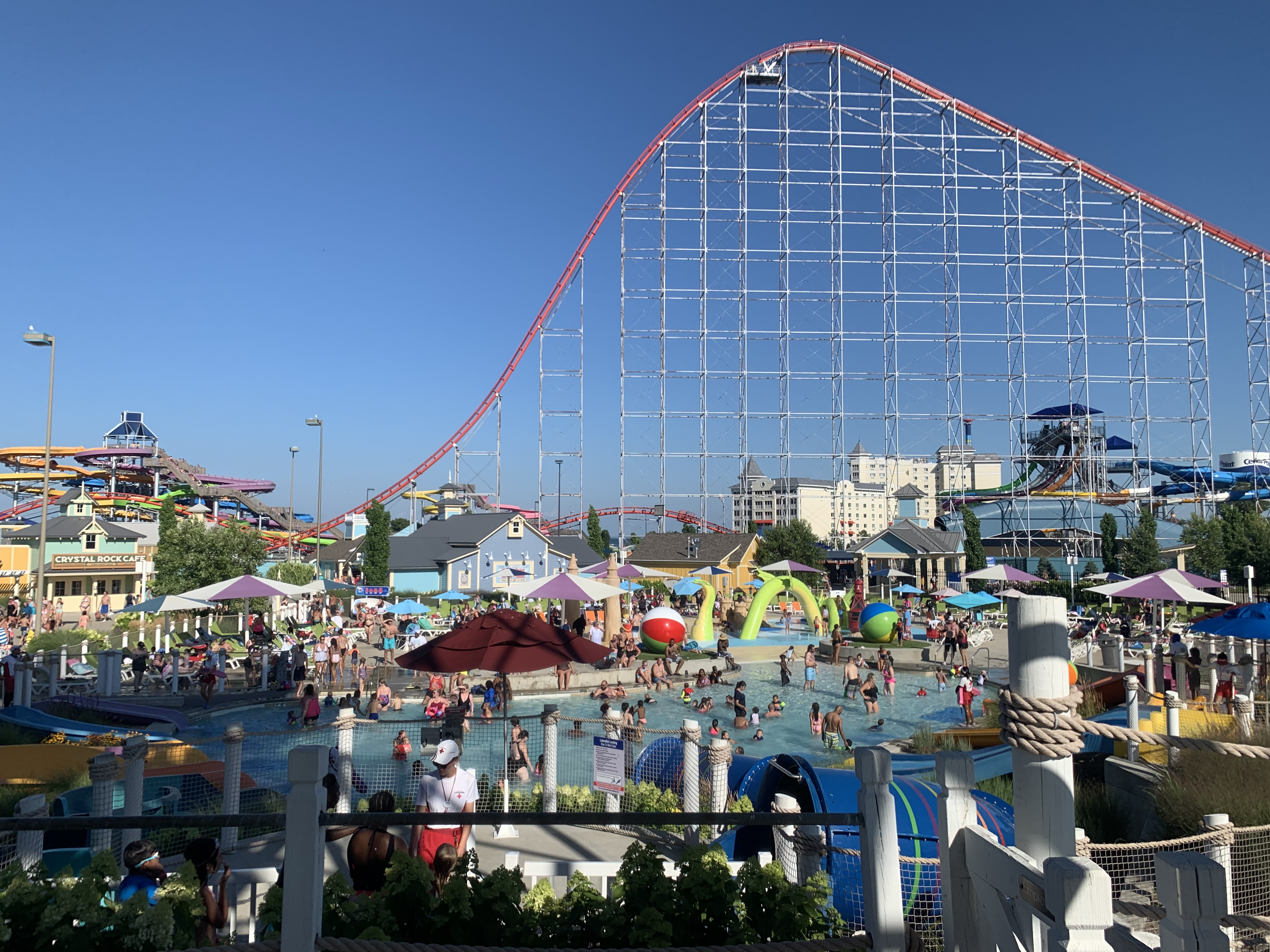
- Cedar Point Shores in July 2022, pictured with the first hill of the Magnum XL-200 coaster and Hotel Breakers
- Interactive map of Cedar Point Shores
- Slogan: Slide On
- Location: Sandusky, Ohio, United States
- Coordinates: 41°29′17″N 82°41′14″W
- Owner: Six Flags
- Opened: 1988
- Previous names: Soak City (1988–2016)
- Operating season: Memorial Day Weekend to Labor Day
- Area: 16 acres (65,000 m^{2})
- Pools: 5 pools
- Water slides: 12 water slides
- Children's areas: 4 children's areas
- Website: www.sixflags.com/cedarpoint/cedar-point-shores

Cedar Point Shores (formerly Soak City) is a water park located adjacent to Cedar Point in Sandusky, Ohio. It is owned and operated by Six Flags.

== History ==
In 1988, the waterpark opened as Soak City. The park originally consisted of ten slides, but more slides were added between 1990 and 1995: Main Stream and Tadpole Town in 1990 and Zoom Flume, Choo Choo Lagoon, and Renegade River in 1995. In 1997, The waterpark then underwent a 6.5-acre expansion that included a wave pool, activity pools for both adults and kids, and multiple enclosed slides featuring rafts. SplashH20, an interactive water playground, was added in 2004. For the 2012 season, all of the water slides in the main complex were repainted, and a new Mat Racer, Dragster H20 (now known as Riptide Raceway), was added, replacing the original speed slides of the park. On August 18, 2016, Cedar Point announced that Soak City would be renamed Cedar Point Shores and expanded to include a slide complex and a new family water playground called Lemmy's Lagoon, replacing the demolished Choo Choo Lagoon. The Surf Shop was also demolished, and a new building was built for the merchandise.

== Slides and attractions ==
Cedar Point Shores offers a wide variety of water slides and other attractions:

| Name | Year opened | Description | Manufacturer | Height requirement | Thrill rating |
|---|---|---|---|---|---|
| Breakwater Bay | 1997 | A wave pool with 3–4 foot waves. Formerly Breakers Bay (1997–2016). | | Over 42" or with an adult (under 52" must wear a life jacket) | 4 |
| Cedar Creek | 1990 | A lazy river. Formerly Main Stream (1990–2016). | | Over 42" or with an adult (under 48" must wear a life jacket) | 2 |
| Crosscurrent | 1988 | A tube slide complex with two regular tube slides and one wide slide with two drops that all end in a 42-inch-deep pool. | Surf Coaster | At least 48" | 5 |
| Great Lakes Cove | 1997 | A children's pool featuring floats designed like animals or logs. Formerly Adventure Cove Floats (1997–2016). | | Over 42" or with an adult (under 54" must wear a life jacket) | 3 |
| Lake Erie Nor'easter | 1997 | A slide complex featuring three twisting, enclosed water slides. Formerly Eerie Falls (1997–2016). Previously black, it was repainted blue and white in 2017. | WhiteWater West | At least 48" | 5 |
| Lakeslide Landing | 2017 | A family water playground with 12 kid-sized slides. | WhiteWater West | At least 36" or with an adult | 3 |
| Lemmy's Lagoon | 2017 | A family water playground. It replaced Choo Choo Lagoon, which was demolished as part of a renovation of Cedar Point Shores. | WhiteWater West | Under 54" | 1 |
| Lily Pad Walk | 1997 | A children's area featuring a pool with lily pads and a rope that kids can climb across. Formerly Adventure Cove Lily Pad Walk (1997–2016). | | Over 42" or with an adult (under 54" must wear a life jacket) | 3 |
| Mufflehead's Beach Bar at Cedar Point Shores | | A swim-up bar that serves cold drinks to adults. | | | 1 |
| Perch Plunge | 1988 | Three body slides with several tunneling areas, twists, and looping turns. There are also three more inner tube slides that offer a milder ride, including a gentle slope recommended for beginners. All the slides were repainted from white to different colors for the 2012 season. Formerly Water Slides (1988–2016). | Surf Coaster | At least 48" | 4 |
| Point Plummet & Portside Plunge | 2017 | A multi-slide complex featuring five- and six-story enclosed slides. | WhiteWater West | At least 48" | 5 |
| Riptide Raceway | 2012 | A six-lane, 44-foot-tall Mat Racer. Formerly Dragster H20 (2012–2016). | WhiteWater West | At least 42" | 4 |
| Runaway Rapids | 1995 | An activity flume with a variety of water features, such as geysers. Formerly Renegade River (1995–2016). | | Over 42" or with an adult (under 48" must wear a life jacket) | 2 |
| SplasH20 | 2004 | A multi-story interactive water playground area with activity pools and slides. Formerly Splash Zone (2004–2016). | WhiteWater West | Adult slides (8 ft or more) accommodate guests of at least 40". Children's slides (under 8 ft) accommodate guests of at least 36" | 2 |
| Storm Surge | 1995 | A family rafting slide that stands 76 ft above the ground. Formerly Zoom Flume (1995–2016). It was repainted for 2017. | WhiteWater West | At least 46" | 5 |
| The Sandlot | | A small "beach" area located at the center of the Cedar Creek lazy river. | | | 1 |
| Waterin' Hole | 1990 | A small children's water playground with plenty of water features. Formerly Tadpole Town (1990–2016). | SCS Interactive | Under 52" or with a child | 1 |
| Wild Walleye | 1988 | Two tube slides with several tunneling areas, twists, and looping turns. These slides were repainted from white to different colors for the 2012 season. Formerly Water Slides (1988–2016). | Surf Coaster | Over 48" | 5 |

=== Former attractions ===
| Name | Year opened | Year closed | Description | Manufacturer | Height requirement | Thrill rating |
|---|---|---|---|---|---|---|
| Choo Choo Lagoon | 1995 | 2016 | Children's play area built around a locomotive-like play structure, with several slides and a small lazy river. Replaced with Lemmy's Lagoon and Lakeslide Landing during Cedar Point Shores renovation in 2016. | SCS Interactive | Under 54" | 1 |
| Speed Slides | Unknown | 2011 | Two body slides. Replaced by Riptide Raceway in 2012. | Surf Coaster | | |

== Gallery ==
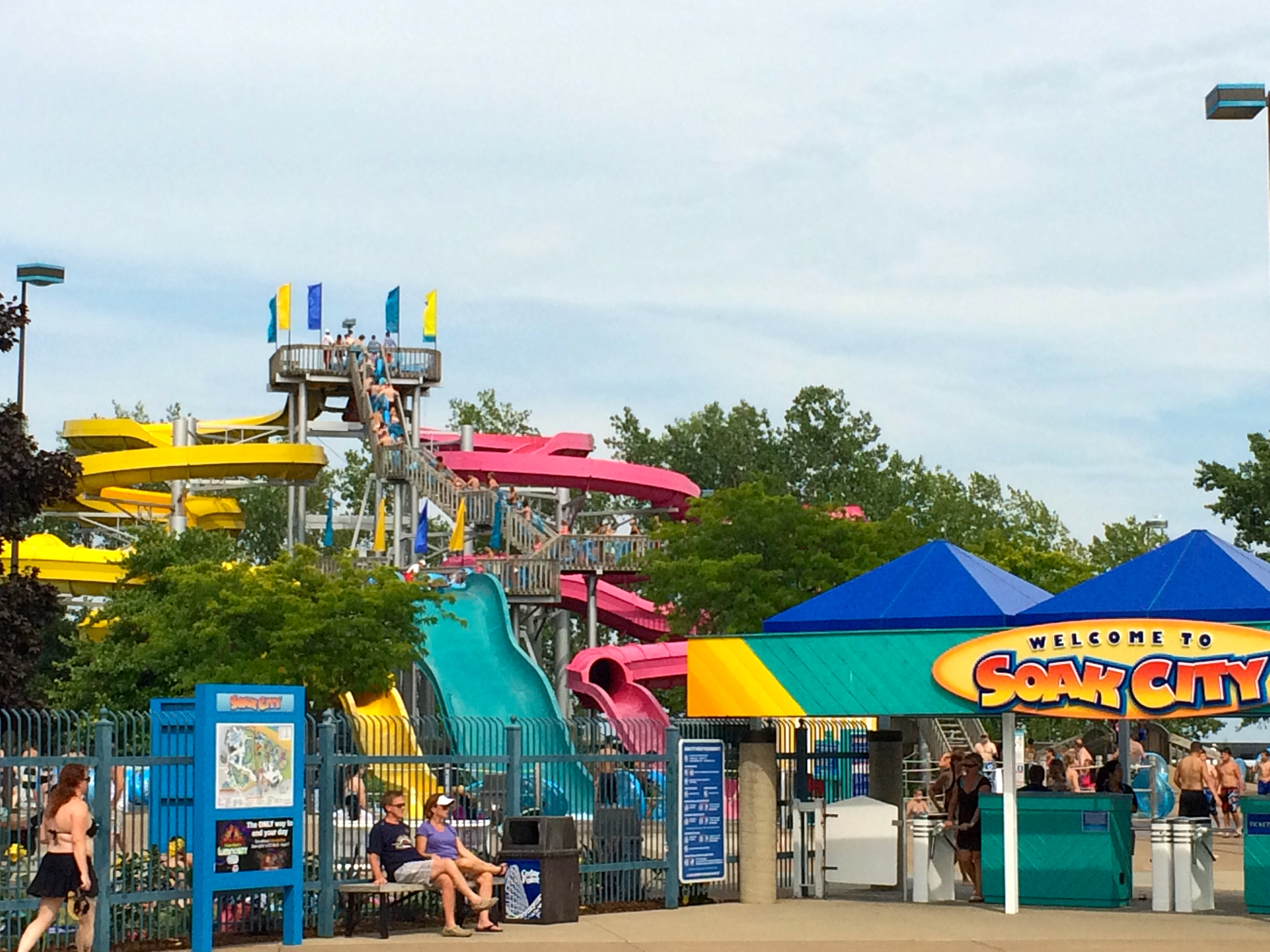
The entrance to Cedar Point Shores when it was Soak City.

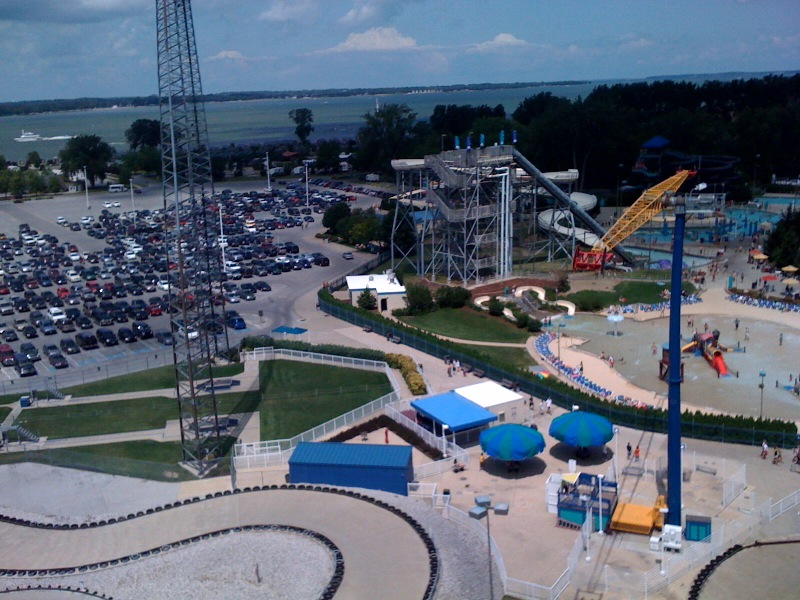
An aerial view of then-Soak City's closed and now-defunct Challenge Park in 2009.

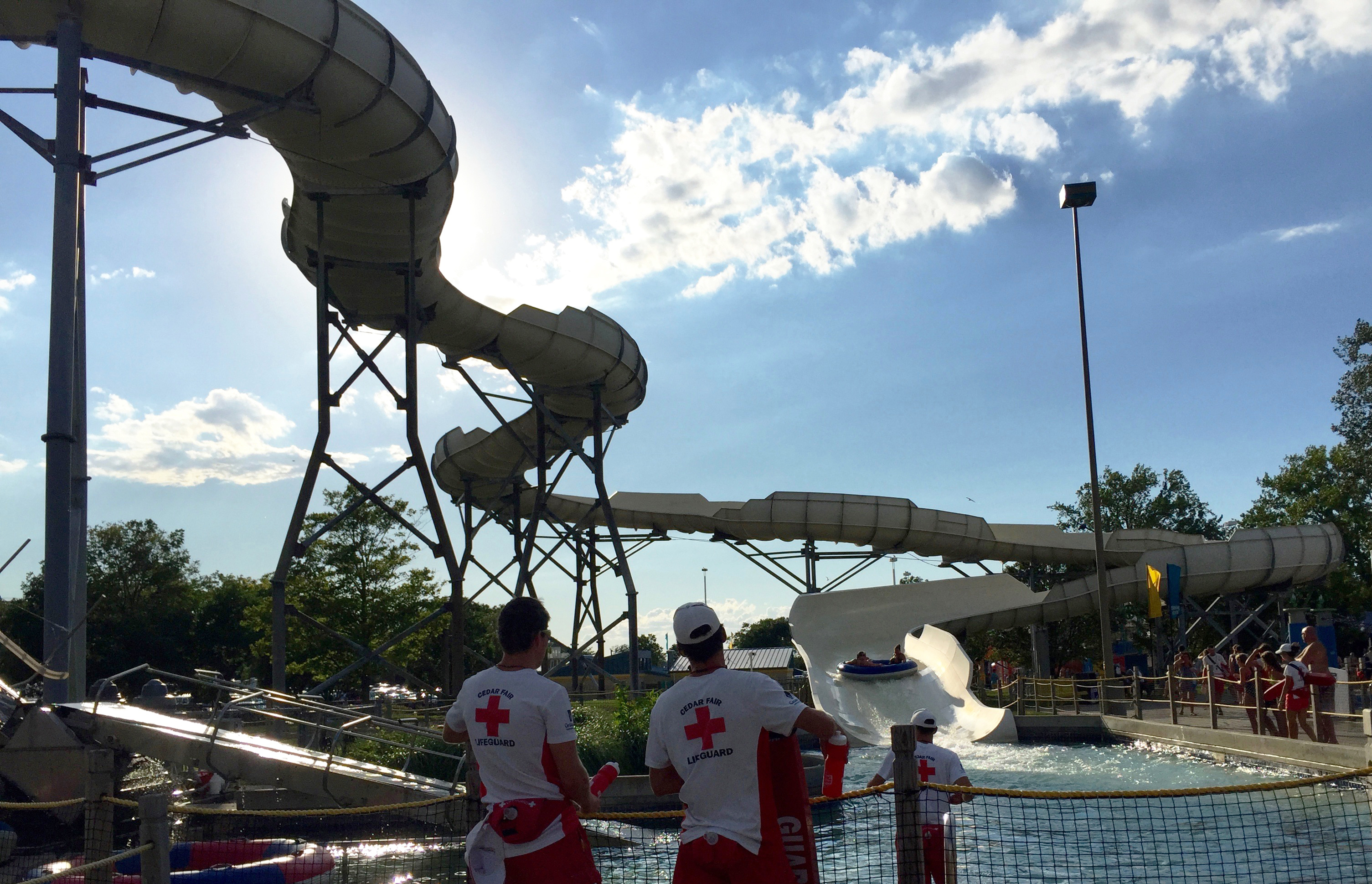
The Storm Surge ride (when it was known as Zoom Flume) in July 2015 before it received a new name and colors for 2017.

== See also ==
- Other Soak City locations
