= Knott's Soak City =

Seasonal water park in California

- Interactive map of Knott's Soak City
- Slogan: The Coolest Spot in Town
- Location: Buena Park, California, United States
- Coordinates: 33°50′27″N 117°59′42″W
- Owner: Six Flags
- Opened: June 17, 2000
- Previous names: Knotts Soak City USA
- Operating season: May — September
- Water slides: 23 water slides
- Children's areas: 2 children's areas
- Website: www.sixflags.com/knotts/soak-city

Knott's Soak City is a seasonal water park owned and operated by Six Flags Entertainment Corporation located in Buena Park, California. The Knott's Soak City name was previously used for two other water parks in Southern California, since sold to SeaWorld Parks & Entertainment and CNL Lifestyle Properties.

== Attractions ==
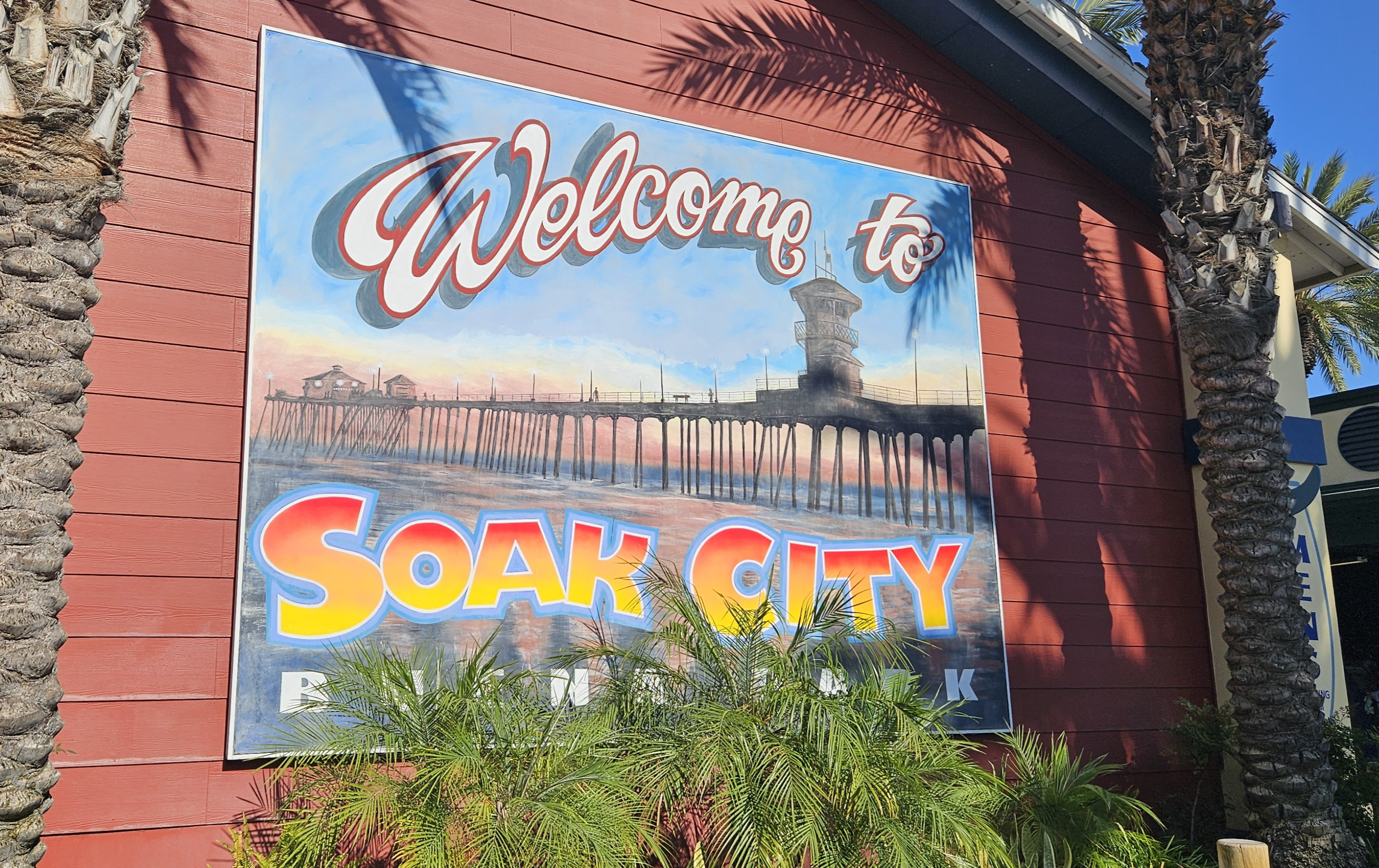
Welcome sign near the admission gate, in between the locker rooms

The chain's first water park opened in Buena Park under the name Soak City U.S.A. on June 17, 2000. It is located east of Knott's Berry Farm and occupies 13 acres (5.3 ha) near the Knott's main parking lot and Independence Hall replica.

Name	Image	Description	Manufacturer	Height Requirement
Banzai Falls		A six-lane family Mat Racer water slide.	WhiteWater West	Over 42"
Beach House		A children's area that features three stories of interactive water guns, nozzles, faucets and other surprises. Every five minutes the water bucket dumps 500 gallons of water on everyone below.	SCS Interactive	
Beach House Slides		Two children water slides connected to the Toyota Beach House.	WhiteWater West	Over 42"
Gremmie Lagoon		A small children's area featuring slides and play areas.		Under 54"
Laguna Storm Water Tower		A slide complex featuring three enclosed slides, 43 feet (13 m) high.	WhiteWater West	Over 42"(Under 48" must wear a life vest)
Malibu Run		A slide complex, 39 feet (12 m), featuring four adventurous slides named Dropoff, Wave Chaser, Heavy Swell, and Rincon.	WhiteWater West	Over 48"
Old Man Falls		A slide complex, 63 feet (19 m) high, featuring three speed slides named, Pipeline, Point Break and Riptide.	WhiteWater West	Over 48"
Shore Break		Opened 2017; Multi-Slide Complex featuring four capsule slides and two dueling tube slides, Similar to identical installations at Kings Island, Carowinds, Dorney Park, Kings Dominion, Cedar Point, Worlds of Fun, and California's Great America.	WhiteWater West	Over 48"
Sunset River		A 1,780-foot-long (540 m) lazy river.		Over 48" or 42" with an adult (Under 48" must wear a life vest)
Tidal Wave Bay		A 750,000-gallon wave pool.		Over 42" or with an adult (Under 52" must wear a life vest)
The Wedge (pictured on the right)		Opened 2017; Six guests at a time will descend down navigating twists and turns and surprise drops.	WhiteWater West	Over 42"

=== Former Attractions ===
Name	Date opened	Date closed	Description	Manufacturer
Pacific Spin	2006	2016	A Tornado water slide with a drop of 75 feet (23 m) into a six-story funnel. It was replaced by The Wedge in 2017.	ProSlide

== Former Knott's Soak City locations ==
=== San Diego ===
The chain's third water park was located in Chula Vista. It opened in 1997 under the name White Water Canyon. On November 20, 2012, Cedar Fair announced it had sold its San Diego Soak City park to SeaWorld Parks & Entertainment. The park reopened as Aquatica San Diego on June 1, 2013.

In Late-2019, it was announced that the park would be re-themed as Sesame Place San Diego for the 2021 season. On September 12, 2021, Aquatica San Diego closed for its final season, with Sesame Place San Diego opening in March 2022.

=== Palm Springs ===
The chain's second water park was located in Palm Springs. It opened in 1986 under the name Oasis Water Park; it was purchased by Cedar Fair and operated under the Knott's name from 2002 to 2013. On August 14, 2013, Cedar Fair announced it had sold its Palm Springs Soak City to CNL Lifestyle Properties. The park was allowed to operate under the Soak City name until the end of the 2013 season. CNL Lifestyle Properties operated the park as Wet'n'Wild Palm Springs until 2018, when it was sold again to Pono Acquisition Partners I, LLC. The park was closed and demolition began in 2019 for transformation into the Palm Springs Surf Club, which was forecasted to open in 2020, but the COVID-19 pandemic pushed it to 2024.

== See also ==
- Soak City (disambiguation)
