= Soak City (Kings Island) =

Water park in Ohio

- Interactive map of Soak City
- Location: Kings Island, Mason, Ohio, United States
- Coordinates: 39.339°N 84.2736°W
- Owner: Six Flags
- Opened: 1989
- Previous names: WaterWorks (1989-2003); Crocodile Dundee's Boomerang Bay (2004-2006); Boomerang Bay (2007-2011)
- Operating season: May through September
- Area: 35 acres (140,000 m^{2})
- Pools: 5 pools
- Water slides: 36 water slides
- Children's areas: 5 children's areas
- Website: www.sixflags.com/kingsisland/soak-city

Soak City is a water park at Kings Island amusement park in Mason, Ohio. Opening in 1989 as WaterWorks, the water park is included with the price of admission to Kings Island. It is owned and operated by Six Flags.

== History ==
Soak City originally opened in 1989 as a 12-acre (4.9 ha) water park under the name WaterWorks featuring 15 water slides and a lazy river ride. WaterWorks was the first themed area to be added to Kings Island since 1976, bringing the total to seven. The cost was roughly $4 million USD.

The water park was expanded in 1997 to 30 acres (12 ha) adding a wave pool. It was renamed in 2004 to Crocodile Dundee's Boomerang Bay, and again in 2007 to Boomerang Bay dropping Crocodile Dundee from the name. On September 2, 2011, Kings Island announced that the water park would undergo a $10-million expansion, which would include the renovation of the water park's main entrance, a revamp of the existing Lazy River ride (to "Action River"), and the construction of additional amenities. A second, larger wave pool was also added, and the water park's name was changed to Soak City for the 2012 season.

== List of attractions ==
Intensity rating (Note: Ratings according to the park's guest assistance guide, where "1" is the least intense and "5" is the most. See the Guest Assistance Guide for more details.)
(mild) 1 2 3 4 5 (extreme)

Name	Picture	Opened	Description	Rating	Ref
Bluegill Lagoon		2025	Located in Splash River Junction. A reimagined ol’ fashioned swimmin’ hole, complete with a water tower.	1	
Breakers Bay		1997	36,000-square-foot (3,300 m^{2}) family-friendly wave pool. Known as Surfside Bay (1997–2003), Great Barrier Reef (2004–2011).	4	
Coconut Cove		2004	Lagoon-style pool complete with cascading waterfalls and in-water lounging areas. Known as Kookaburra Bay (2004–2011)	1	
Mondo Monsoon		2004	A four-passenger, raft ride – ProSlide Tornado model – which begins enclosed and ends with a steep drop into an open funnel. Known as Tazmanian Typhoon (2004–2011)	5	
Paradise Plunge		1989	Four twisting body slides which descend into a splash pool. Known as The Helix (1989–2003), Down Under Thunder (2004–2011).	4	
Pineapple Pipeline		1989	Three fully enclosed body slides. Known as Bonzai Pipeline (1989–2003), Bondi Pipeline (2004–2011).	3	
Rendezvous Run		2004	A set of four head-first, racing slides up to 50-foot (15 m) high that are enclosed during the first portion of the ride before sending riders down a series of hills to the finish. Known as Coolangatta Racer (2004–2011)	4	
Riverbank Slide Out		1997	Located in Splash River Junction. Children's inner tube slide and splash pool. Opened as part of Buccaneer Island (1997–2003). Known as Koala Splash (2004–2011) and Aruba Tuba (2012–2024).	2	
RiverRacers		2025	Hold on tight! Riders board side-by-side rafts at the starting line where a conveyor belt launch sends them plunging down a 33-foot, 47-degree first drop. Giant windows help racers see if their raft is in the lead while the water coaster reaches its 30 mph, fastest speed. As each raft nears the bottom of the drop and starts to climb upward, water jets drench the riders and propel them up into an enclosed tunnel illuminated with special lighting effects. The race is on as racers zip through more twists and turns, rushing into an open-air, high-banking slingshot, whipping them around 180 degrees into a gravity-defying final mega drop to see who crosses the finish line first!	4	
Salamander Sliders		2025	Located in Splash River Junction. Seven children water slides.	2	
Splash Landing		2004	Family-oriented, multi-level water play area complete with slides, bridges and a giant dumping bucket. Known as Jackaroo Landing (2004–2011).	2	
Splash River		1989	A 0.25-mile (0.40 km) inner tube lazy river ride revamped in 2012 that features raindrop mushrooms, geysers, waterfalls, and areas that allow interaction between riders and spectators. Known as Kings Mills Run (1989–2004), Crocodile Run (2004–2011).	2	
Tadpool		1997	Located in Splash River Junction. Children's water play area with several water slides. Opened as part of Buccaneer Island (1997–2003). Known as Wallaby Wharf (2004–2011) and Castaway Cove (2012–2024)	1	
Thunder Falls		1989	A pair of classic inner-tube slides. Formerly known as Sidewinder (1989–2003), Sydney Sidewinder (2004–2011)	3	
Tidal Wave Bay		2012	42,000-square-foot (3,900 m^{2}) wave pool.	4	
Tropical Plunge		2016	A multi-slide complex with body and tube slides. It is identical to the installations at other parks including Kings Dominion, Dorney Park, Carowinds, Cedar Point, Knott's Berry Farm, Worlds of Fun, and California's Great America.	5	
Tropical Twister		1989	A pair of fully enclosed body slides made of translucent fiberglass that twist around each other during their descent. Known as Ultra Twister (1989–2003), Awesome Aussie Twister (2004–2011).	4	
Zoom Flume		1990	A family raft ride that accommodates up to four riders per raft. Known as Rushing River (1990–2003), Known as Snowy River Rampage (2004–2011)	4	

== See also ==
- Other Soak City locations
- List of Six Flags water parks
