= 2018 in amusement parks =

This is a list of events and openings related to amusement parks that occurred in 2018. These various lists are not exhaustive.

== Amusement parks ==
=== Opening ===
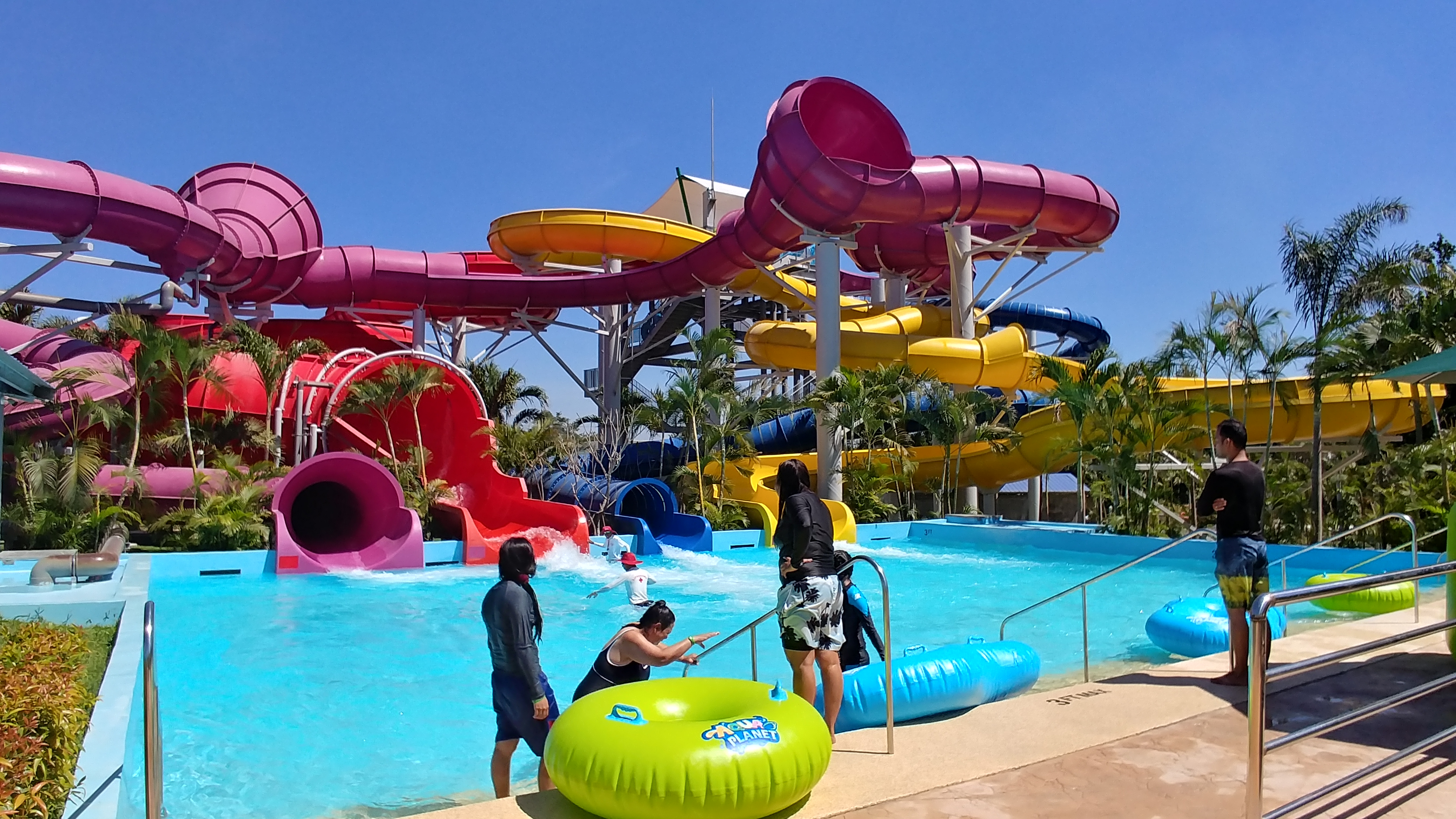
Aqua Planet opened in February.

- China Three Gorges Happy World – January 19
- Mexico Kataplum – November 1
- U.S. Adventure Zone at Bear Lake – June 16
- U.S. America's Fun Park – May 18
- China Huayi Brothers Movie World
- Russia Dreamwood
- China Nanjing Wanda Theme Park – June 1
- Poland Holiday Park Kownaty – September 29
- France Parc Spirou – June 1
- UAE Warner Bros. World Abu Dhabi – July 25
- Malaysia Skytropolis Funland – December 7
- Indonesia Saloka Park – December 15
- Philippines Aqua Planet – February 24

=== Change of name ===
- U.S. Waterworld California » Six Flags Hurricane Harbor Concord
- UAE Sega Republic » VR Park Dubai

=== Change of ownership ===
- Darien Lake – Premier Parks » Six Flags
- Frontier City – Premier Parks » Six Flags
- White Water Bay (Oklahoma) – Premier Parks » Six Flags
- Wet'n'Wild SplashTown – Premier Parks » Six Flags
- Wet'n'Wild Phoenix – Premier Parks» Six Flags

=== Birthday ===
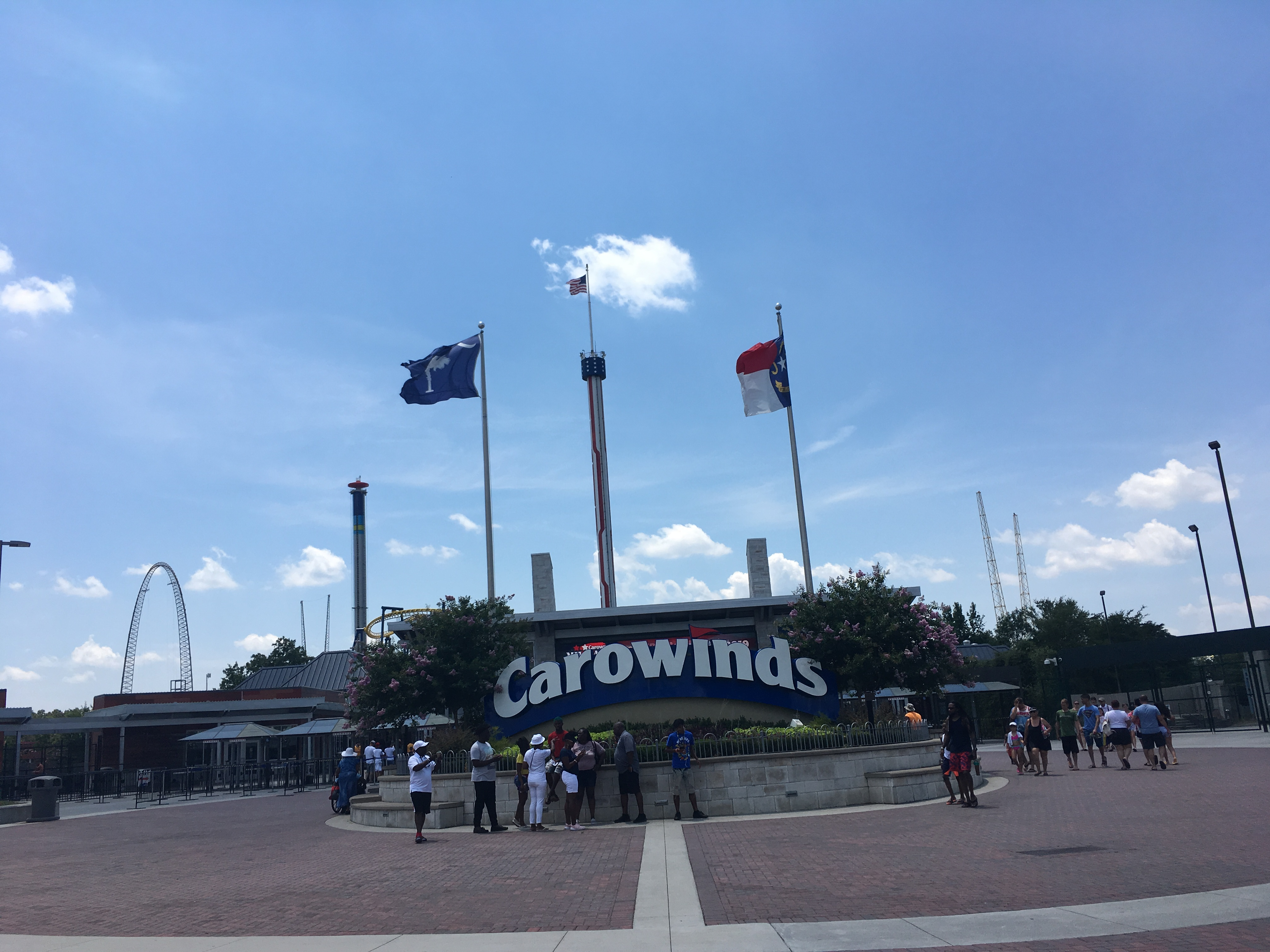
Carowinds celebrated its 45th anniversary in March.

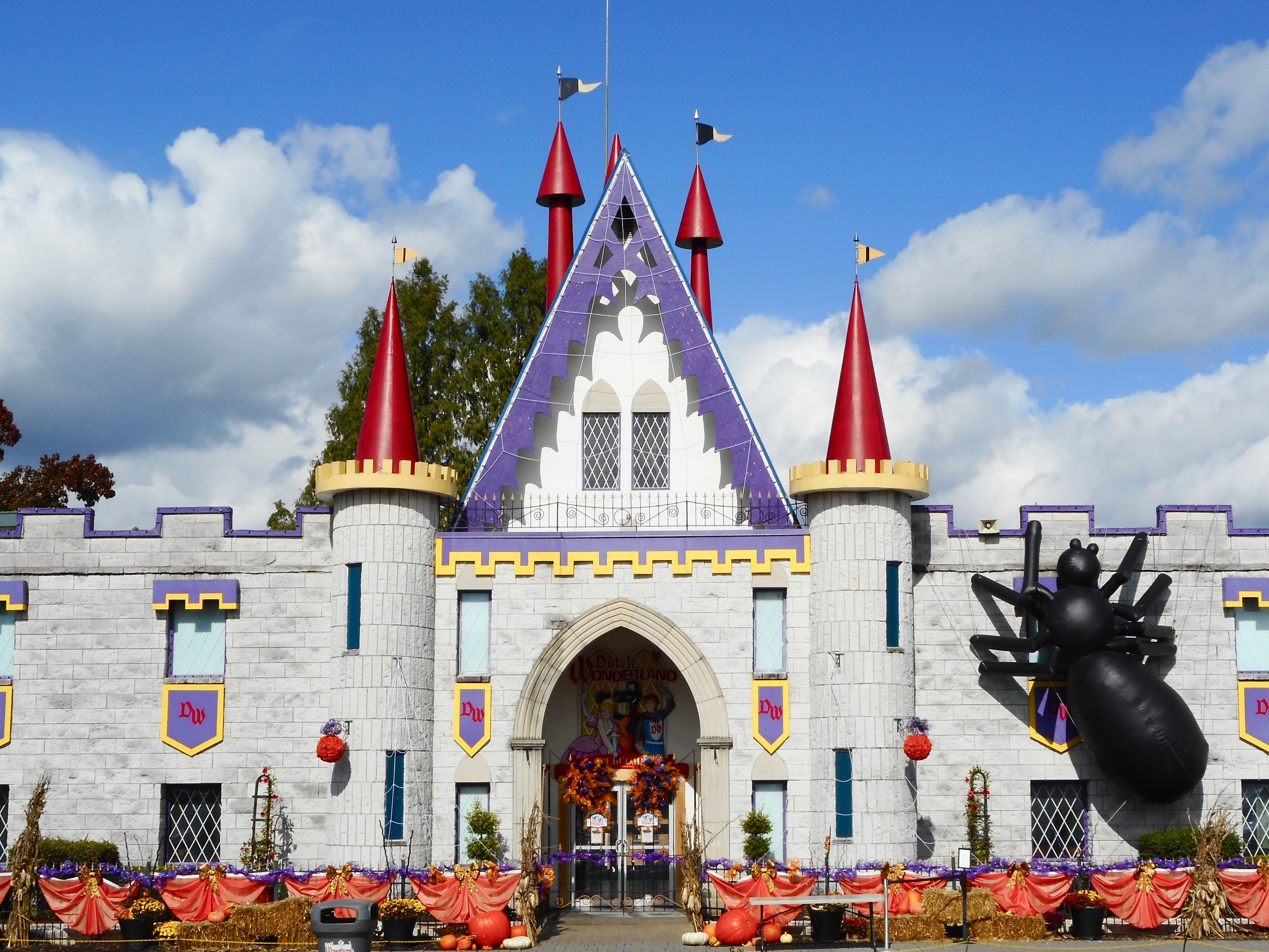
Dutch Wonderland celebrated its 55th anniversary in March.

- Adventuredome – 25th Birthday
- Alabama Splash Adventure – 20th Birthday
- Belantis – 15th Birthday
- Carowinds – 45th Birthday
- Disney's Animal Kingdom – 20th Birthday
- Dutch Wonderland – 55th Birthday
- Frontier City – 60th Birthday
- Attractiepark Slagharen – 55th Birthday
- Heide Park Resort – 40th Birthday
- Movieland Park – 15th Birthday
- SeaWorld Orlando – 45th Birthday
- SeaWorld San Antonio – 30th Birthday
- Silverwood Theme Park – 30th Birthday
- Tokyo Disneyland – 35th Birthday
- Worlds of Fun – 45th Birthday

=== Closed ===
- Ratanga Junction – May 1
- Bowcraft Playland – September 30
- Giant Wheel Park of Suzhou – September 10
- Heritage Amusement Park – June 30

== Additions ==
=== Roller coasters ===
==== New ====
Name	Park	Type	Manufacturer	Opened	Ref(s)
Achterbahn	Ferienzentrum Schloss Dankern	Family roller Coaster	ABC Rides	March 17	
Adrenaline Peak	Oaks Amusement Park	Euro-Fighter roller coaster	Gerstlauer	March 24	
BoBoiBoy Cattus Coaster	Movie Animation Park Studios	Steel roller coaster	unknown	December 7	
Broken Rail Coaster	Great Xingdong Tourist World	Broken Rail Coaster	Golden Horse	2018	
Bûche Dansante	Babyland-Amiland	Spinning roller coaster	SBF Visa Group	October 6	
Chu-Chu	Kataplum	Family roller Coaster	SBF Visa Group	November 1	
Cobra	Freizeit-Land Geiselwind	Steel roller coaster	Interpark	March 24	
Cruiser Coaster	Craig's Cruisers Family Fun Center, Wyoming	Indoor Spinning roller coaster	SBF Visa Group	February 2	
Dax the Ride	Imagic Park	Indoor Suspended roller coaster	Wiegand	November 23	
Dolle Pier	DippieDoe Attractiepark	Junior roller Coaster	SBF Visa Group	March 30	
Electric Eel	SeaWorld San Diego	Launched roller coaster	Premier Rides	May 10	
En avant Seccotine	Parc Spirou	Junior roller coaster	Zierer	June 16	
Family Coaster	Land of Legends Theme Park	Family roller coaster	Gerstlauer	2018	
Family Inverted Coaster	Happy Valley Beijing	Inverted roller coaster	Bolliger & Mabillard	March	
Fast and Furry-ous	Warner Bros. World Abu Dhabi	Inverted roller coaster	Intamin	July 25	
Flyvende Ørn	Legoland Billund Resort	Family roller Coaster	Zierer	March 24	
Fēnix	Toverland	Wing coaster	Bolliger & Mabillard	July 7	
HangTime	Knott's Berry Farm	Infinity Coaster	Gerstlauer	May 18	
Harley Quinn Crazy Coaster	Six Flags Discovery Kingdom	Skywarp Dual Loop coaster	Skyline Attractions	August 3	
Heaven's Wing	Huayi Brothers Movie World	Wing Coaster	Bolliger & Mabillard	2018	
Hyper Coaster	Land of Legends Theme Park	Hypercoaster	Mack Rides	2018	
Hyperion	Energylandia	Mega Coaster	Intamin	July 14	
Icon	Blackpool Pleasure Beach	Launched roller coaster	Mack Rides	May 25	
Inflaming Beatles	Huayi Brothers Movie World	Steel roller coaster	Beijing Jiuhua Amusement Rides Manufacturing Co.	2018	
Jungle Rally	Djurs Sommerland	Junior roller Coaster	Zierer	April 27	
Jungle Trailblazer	Fantawild Asian Legends, Nanning	Wooden roller coaster	The Gravity Group	August 18	
Junior Red Force	Ferrari Land	Family roller Coaster	SBF Visa Group	May 22	
K2	Karls Erlebnis-Dorf	Family roller Coaster	ABC Rides	April 21	
King Kong - The Giant Ape Adventure	Carthageland	Spinning roller coaster	Eos Rides	March 19	
Laoshan Flying Dragon	Qingdao Wanda Theme Park	Inverted roller coaster	unknown	2018	
Launch Coaster	Colourful Yunnan Paradise	Launched roller coaster	Mack Rides	July 5	
Merlin's Mayhem	Dutch Wonderland	Inverted roller coaster	S&S Worldwide	April 28	
Oscar's Wacky Taxi	Sesame Place	Wooden roller coaster	The Gravity Group	May 26	
Paradise Fall	Sun World Danang Wonders	Launched roller coaster	Intamin	April 9	
Pinball X	Dreamland	Wild Mouse roller coaster	Zamperla	2018	
Pioneer	OK Corral	Steel roller coaster	Zierer	June 2	
RailBlazer	California's Great America	Steel roller coaster	Rocky Mountain Construction	June 14	
Rex's Racer	Shanghai Disneyland	Launched Shuttle roller coaster	Intamin	April 26	
Roller Coaster	Three Gorges Happy World	Steel roller coaster	Qin Long	January 19	
Rollercoaster Wikingów	Majaland Kownaty	Indoor Family roller Coaster	Zierer	September 29	
Speed Rockets	Jardin d'Acclimatation	Steel roller coaster	Gerstlauer	June 1	
Sea Viper	Palace Playland	Steel roller coaster	Preston & Barbieri	June 9	
Slinky Dog Dash	Disney's Hollywood Studios	Launched roller coaster	Mack Rides	June 30	
Speed	Energylandia	Water Coaster	Intamin	April 2	
Spinner	Luneur Park	Spinning roller coaster	Eos Rides	2018	
Spirou Racing	Parc Spirou	Steel roller coaster	Zierer	June 16	
Steel Dolphin	Shanghai Haichang Ocean Park	Blitz roller coaster	Intamin	November 17	
Stress Express	Fantawild Asian Legends, Nanning	Boomerang roller coaster	Vekoma	August 8	
Tantrum	Six Flags Darien Lake	Euro-Fighter roller coaster	Gerstlauer	May 25	
Thunderchariot	Discoveryland, Dalian	Steel roller coaster	Zamperla	March 24	
Tiki-Waka	Walibi Belgium	Steel roller coaster	Gerstlauer	April 7	
Time Traveler	Silver Dollar City	Spinning roller coaster	Mack Rides	March 14	
Tom and Jerry Swiss Cheese Spin	Warner Bros. World Abu Dhabi	Spinning roller coaster	Zamperla	July 25	
Trampolino-Coaster	Trampolino Familien-und Freizeitpark	Cyclon Coaster	SBF Visa Group	May 5	
Tweestryd	Wildlands Adventure Zoo Emmen	Dueling Family Boomerang	Vekoma	March 28	
Twist-N-Shout	Fun Land of Fredericksburg	Spinning roller coaster	SBF Visa Group	June 9	
Valkyria	Liseberg	Dive Coaster	Bolliger & Mabillard	August 10	
Wanted by Lucky Luke	Parc Spirou Provence	Junior roller Coaster	Zierer	June 16	
Western Regions Heaven	Happy Valley Chengdu	Dive Coaster	Bolliger & Mabillard	February 10	
Wicker Man	Alton Towers	Wooden roller coaster	Great Coasters International	March 20	
Boat Workshop	Nanjing Wanda Theme Park	Motorbike roller coaster	Golden Horse	June 1	
Wild Whizzer	Morey's Piers	Spinning roller coaster	SBF Visa Group	June 2	
Insomnio	Kataplum	Suspended roller coaster	Vekoma	November 1	
Carros Locos	Kataplum	Spinning roller coaster	SBF Visa Group	November 1	
Wipeout	Palace Playland	Spinning roller coaster	SBF Visa Group	July 19	
Wonder Woman Coaster	Six Flags Mexico	4th Dimension roller coaster	S&S Worldwide	June 1	
Wonder Woman Golden Lasso Coaster	Six Flags Fiesta Texas	Steel roller coaster	Rocky Mountain Construction	May 12	
Wood Express	Parc Saint Paul	Wooden roller coaster	The Gravity Group	July 1	
Yukon Quad	Le Pal	Launched roller coaster	Intamin	April 7	
Mine 1771	Dreamwood	Mine train roller coaster	Maurer Rides	June 2018	
Tabalugas Achterbahn	Holiday Park	Family roller Coaster	Zierer	July 21	
Wilde Hilde	Schwaben Park	Roller Ball	Ride Engineers Switzerland	October 13	
Wing Coaster	Colourful Yunnan Paradise	Wing Coaster	Bolliger & Mabillard	July 5	

==== Relocated ====
Name	Park	Type	Manufacturer	Opened	Formerly	Ref(s)
Circuit Bobsleigh	Parc de la Vallée	Steel roller coaster	Anton Schwarzkopf	2018	Bobsleigh at Nigloland	
Crazy Coaster	South Pier, Blackpool	Spinning roller coaster	Reverchon	2018	Crazy Coaster at Arcadia City	
Emerald Coaster	Sam's Fun City	Steel roller coaster	Pinfari	March 16	Cat & Mouse at Ocean Beach Pleasure Park	
Dragon Challenge	Barry Island Pleasure Park	Junior roller coaster	Pinfari	2018	Beastie at Alton Towers	
Looping Star	Parko Paliatso Luna Park	Steel roller coaster	Anton Schwarzkopf	April 1	Thunder Loop at Attractiepark Slagharen	
Dragon Coaster	Castle Fun Center	Family roller Coaster	E&F Miler Industries	2018	Python Roller Coaster at Party Zone USA	

==== Refurbished ====
Name	Park	Type	Manufacturer	Opened	Formerly	Ref(s)
Apple Zapple	Kings Dominion	Wild Mouse roller coaster	Mack Rides	2018	Richocet	
Chhota Bheem The Ride	Adlabs Imagica	Steel roller coaster	I.E. Park	2018	Bandits of Robin Hood	
Dubai Drone	VR Park Dubai	Spinning roller coaster	Gerstlauer	2018	Spin Gear	
Eurosat - CanCan Coaster	Europa-Park	Enclosed roller coaster	Mack Rides	2018	Eurosat	
Great Lego Race	Legoland Florida; Legoland Malaysia; Legoland Deutschland	VR Wild Mouse roller coaster	Mack Rides	2018	Project-X	
Incredicoaster	Disney California Adventure	Launched roller coaster	Intamin	June 23	California Screamin'	
Kiddy Hawk	Carowinds	Inverted roller coaster	Vekoma	2018	Flying Ace Aerial Chase	
Pandashi	Kobe Oji Zoo	Powered roller coaster	Zamperla	2018	Dragon	
Racer 75	Kings Dominion	Wooden Roller Coaster	Philadelphia Toboggan Coasters	2018	Rebel Yell	
Riddler Revenge	Six Flags New England	Inverted roller coaster	Vekoma	2018	Mind Eraser	
Steel Vengeance	Cedar Point	Steel roller coaster	Rocky Mountain Construction	May 5	Mean Streak	
Twisted Cyclone	Six Flags Over Georgia	Steel roller coaster	Rocky Mountain Construction	May 25	Georgia Cyclone	
Twisted Timbers	Kings Dominion	Steel roller coaster	Rocky Mountain Construction	March 24	Hurler	
The Walking Dead: The Ride	Thorpe Park	Enclosed roller coaster	Vekoma	March 31	X	

=== Other attractions ===
==== New ====
Name	Park	Type	Opened	Ref(s)
Adventure Bay	Nickelodeon Universe Mall Of America	Open-Play area	Oct 25	
Balloon Race Cannon Bowl	Waldameer & Water World	Zamperla Samba Balloon 8 (Balloon Race) ProSlide Technology CannonBOWL	May 5 May 25	
Battle For Eire	Busch Gardens Williamsburg	VR motion simulator	2018	
Crazanity	Six Flags Magic Mountain	Giant Discovery Frisbee	2018	
Cyborg Cyber Spin	Six Flags Great Adventure	Gyroscopic Thrill Ride	2018	
Delirious	Valleyfair	Super Loop	2018	
DreamWorks Theatre	Universal Studios Hollywood	4D film	June 15	
Fast & Furious: Supercharged	Universal Studios Florida	3D dark ride	April 23	
Flying Canoes	Canada's Wonderland	Interactive Family Ride	May 2018	
Harley Quinn Spinsanity	Six Flags New England; Six Flags Over Texas	Giant Discovery Frisbee; Gyroscopic Thrill Ride	2018	
Infinity Falls	SeaWorld Orlando	River rapids ride	2018	
Lakeside Lagoon	Splash Works (Canada's Wonderland)	Children's pool & slides	May 2018	
Lumberjack	Canada's Wonderland	Hawk	May 2018	
Mardi Gras Hangover	Six Flags Great America	Giant Loop	2018	
Nordic Chaser	Worlds of Fun	SeaStorm	2018	
Pandemonium	Great Escape	Freestyle	2018	
Peppa Pig Land	Gardaland	Themed area	March 29	
Peppa Pig Land	Heide Park	Themed area	March 24	
Rock 'n' Roller	Kentucky Kingdom	Mini Himalaya	2018	
San Andreas	Gardaland	4D film	March 29	
Scream Xtreme	Kentucky Kingdom	Endeavour	2018	
Splashwater Island	Six Flags Hurricane Harbor Concord	Water play area	2018	
Tik Tak	Tivoli Gardens	Mondial Shake R5	August 15	
Toy Story Land	Shanghai Disneyland Park; Disney's Hollywood Studios	Themed area	April 26; June 30	
Tourbillon	La Ronde	Tilt-A-Whirl	2018	
Typhoon Twister	Six Flags St. Louis	Waterslide	2018	
Wahoo River	Six Flags America	Lazy river	2018	

==== Refurbished ====
Name	Park	Type	Opened	Formerly	Ref(s)
Camp Snoopy	Carowinds	Themed area	March 24	Planet Snoopy	
I Corsari : La Vendetta Del Fantasma	Gardaland	Dark Ride	March 29	I Corsari	
Pemburu Badai	Trans Studio Bandung	Drop Tower	August 31	Trans Broadcast Museum	
Pixar Pier	Disney California Adventure	Themed area	June 23	Paradise Pier	

== Closed attractions & roller coasters ==
Name	Park	Type	Closed	Refs
A Bug's Land	Disney California Adventure	Themed Area	September 4	
Apocalypse	Six Flags America	Stand-up roller coaster	September 5	
Atomic Coaster	Beijing Shijingshan Amusement Park	Steel roller coaster	2018	
Bushwacker	Ratanga Junction	Junior roller coaster	May 1	
Cannonball Run	Waterville USA	Wooden roller coaster	September 30	
Circle of Life: An Environmental Fable	Epcot	Cinema	February 3	
Cobra	Ratanga Junction	Vekoma Suspended roller coaster	May 1	
Crossbow	Bowcraft Playland	Steel roller coaster	September 30	
Dinosaurs Alive!	Canada's Wonderland; Cedar Point; Dorney Park & Wildwater Kingdom; Kings Dominion	Walk-through Exhibit	October 28; September 3 October 28; October 28	
Dragon	Bowcraft Playland	Junior roller coaster	September 30	
Dragon in the Day	Dream World Riz-Zoawd	Steel roller coaster	2018	
El Diablo	Six Flags Great Adventure	Giant Loop	2018	
Firehawk	Kings Island	Vekoma Flying Dutchman roller coaster	October 28	
Flitzer	Jenkinson's Boardwalk	Steel roller coaster	2018	
Flitzer	Morey's Piers	Steel roller coaster	September 30	
G Force	Drayton Manor	Steel roller coaster	2018	
Harley Quinn Spinsanity	Six Flags Over Texas	Troika	November 4	
It's Tough to Be a Bug!	Disney California Adventure	4-D attraction	March 19	
Jimmy Neutron's Atomic Collider	Nickelodeon Universe	Hexentanz	April 20	
Jungle Flyers	Busch Gardens Tampa	Ziplines	2018	
Jurassic Park: The Ride	Universal Studios Hollywood	Shoot the Chute	September 3	
Karavanen	Tivoli Gardens	Family roller coaster	2018	
Kidzopolis	Great Escape	Kids Area	2018	
Mad Mouse	Joyland Amusement Park	Wild Mouse roller coaster	2018	
Odinexpressen	Tivoli Gardens	Powered roller coaster	2018	
Orbiter	Canada's Wonderland	Enterprise	October 28*	
Orkanens Øje	Tivoli Friheden	Zyklon roller coaster	October 21	
The Pictorium	Six Flags Great America	Theater	May 4	
Pirates in Batavia	Europa-Park	Dark ride	May 26	
Quest for Chi	Legoland Florida	Splash Battle	May 28	
Reese's Xtreme Cup Challenge	Hersheypark	Dark ride	September 3	
Robin Hood	Walibi Holland	Wooden roller coaster	October 28	
Rip’n Roarin Rapids	Carowinds	Rapid	Septem	
Scooby-Doo! Ghostblasters: The Mystery of the Haunted Mansion	Six Flags Fiesta Texas	Dark ride	January 7	
Shamu Express	Seaworld Orlando	Junior roller coaster	April 8	
Sky Coaster	Six Flags America	Skycoaster	2018	
Stingray	Giant Wheel Park of Suzhou	Stingray roller coaster	September 10	
Twister	Darien Lake	Top Spin	2018	
Vleermuis	Plopsaland	Batflyer	January 7	
Volcano: The Blast Coaster	Kings Dominion	Launched Inverted roller coaster	May 6	
White Cyclone	Nagashima Spa Land	Wooden roller coaster	January 28	
Wild Kitty	Frontier City	Kiddie roller coaster		
Witches' Wheel	Cedar Point	Enterprise	September 3	

- * This ride's closure was announced after the 2018 season
