= Wild Waves Theme Park =

Defunct amusement park in Washington state, United States

Wild Waves Theme & Water Park
- Previously known as Enchanted Village (1977–83); Enchanted Parks (1984); Wild Waves and Enchanted Village (1984–2006); Wild Waves Theme Park (2007–2016); Wild Waves and Enchanted Village (park was split into 2 different parks) (2016); Wild Waves Theme & Water Park (2017–2026)
- Interactive map of Wild Waves Theme & Water Park
- Location: 36201 Enchanted Parkway S, Federal Way, Washington
- Coordinates: 47.2725°N 122.3115°W
- Status: Permanently Closed
- Opened: May 28, 1977
- Closed: November 1, 2026
- Owner: EPR Properties
- Operated by: Premier Parks, LLC
- Slogan: goWILD
- Operating season: May to October
- Area: 70+ Acres

Attractions
- Total: Theme park: 23; Water park: 10; Total: 33
- Roller coasters: 4
- Water rides: 10
- Website: wildwaves.com

Wild Waves Theme & Water Park was an amusement park and water park in Federal Way, Washington. Opened in 1977 as The Enchanted Village (with its accompanying water park, Wild Waves, opening in 1984), the park was a popular summer destination in the Pacific Northwest. The park's name was reverted to Wild Waves Water Park and Enchanted Village Amusement Park in April 2016, and once again changed to Wild Waves Theme and Water Park in November 2016, as a result of the park's acquisition by EPR Properties. On December 10, 2025, the park announced that the 2026 season would be its final year of operation, reopening on May 23, 2026. The water park portion closed on September 7, 2026, while the rest of the park closed to the public on November 1, 2026.

== History ==
=== Founding through today ===
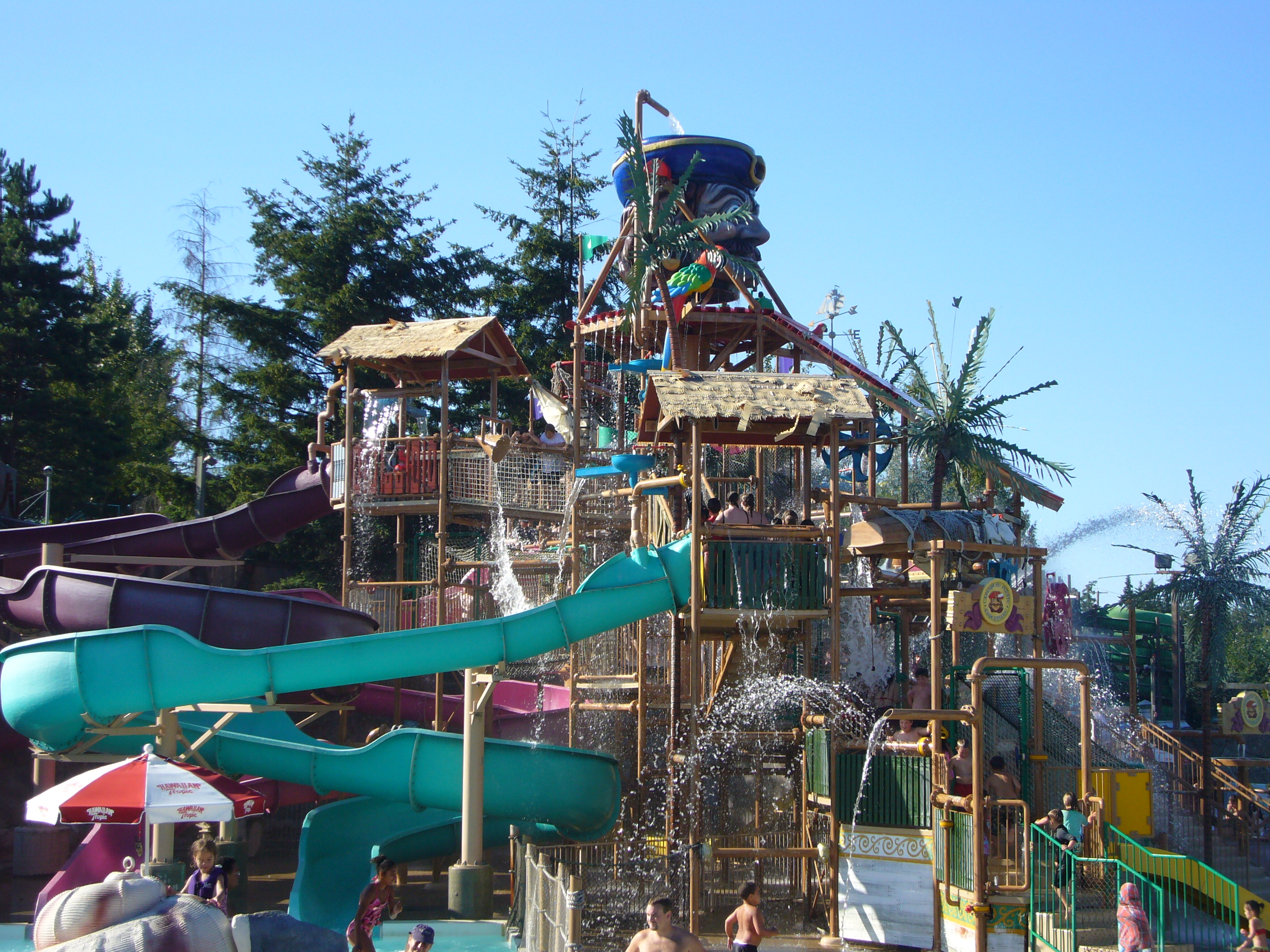
Hook's Lagoon

The Enchanted Village theme park was first opened on May 28, 1977, by Byron Betts, operator of Point Defiance Park in Tacoma. Betts had previously planned to open an amusement park in 1961 near the SeaTac Mall, but plans fell through. The initial 12-acre (49,000 m^{2}) park site held only a half-dozen rides and included a playground, wading pool, and petting zoo. The 24-acre (9.7 ha) Wild Waves Waterpark was built adjacent to Enchanted Village and opened on August 4, 1984; the combined amusement complex became known as Enchanted Parks. In 1991, co-owners Michael Moodenbaugh and Jeff Stock paid $8 million for Enchanted Parks. In 1993, Moodenbaugh traded his share of Enchanted Parks, Inc., for shares in their jointly owned amusement park in Amherstburg, Ontario, Canada called Boblo Island Amusement Park, Inc. In 1993, Jeff Stock purchased several rides from Boblo Island. Stock then sold his shares of Enchanted Parks, Inc., in late 2000 to Six Flags for $19.3 million. In 1997, the park purchased the Loop Corkscrew roller coaster from the defunct Rocky Point Amusement Park in Warwick, Rhode Island and renamed the ride the Wild Thing. In 2000, the park had grown to over 70 acres (280,000 m^{2}), with more than 20 rides, and was the Northwest's largest waterpark. In 2002 and 2003, major expansion took place, with the addition of several new attractions, many manufactured by Zamperla and S&S Power. Also in 2002, approximately 1000 seasonal workers were employed for positions as rides operators and food service workers. Many of these seasonal workers are also students of local high schools. The park's name was reverted to Enchanted Village and Wild Waves Water Park for the 2016 season to once again split the park into two separate parks instead of one. This was accomplished by having a second entrance at the top of the parking lot to enter Enchanted Village and the main entrance was used to enter Wild Waves Water Park. Ticket holders could purchase a pass to just Wild Waves or just Enchanted Village. They could also purchase a more expensive park hopper pass. Season pass members got park hopper access free with their membership. In the 2017 season, this system was removed and the entire park became Wild Waves Theme and Water Park. This change was due to many complaints that the park hopping ticket system was too complicated. In 2020, the park failed to open due to the COVID-19 pandemic. Tickets and season passes were rolled over into 2021. During the 2021 season, there were many COVID mitigation strategies in place such as reservations, distancing, and masks.

=== Ownership changes ===
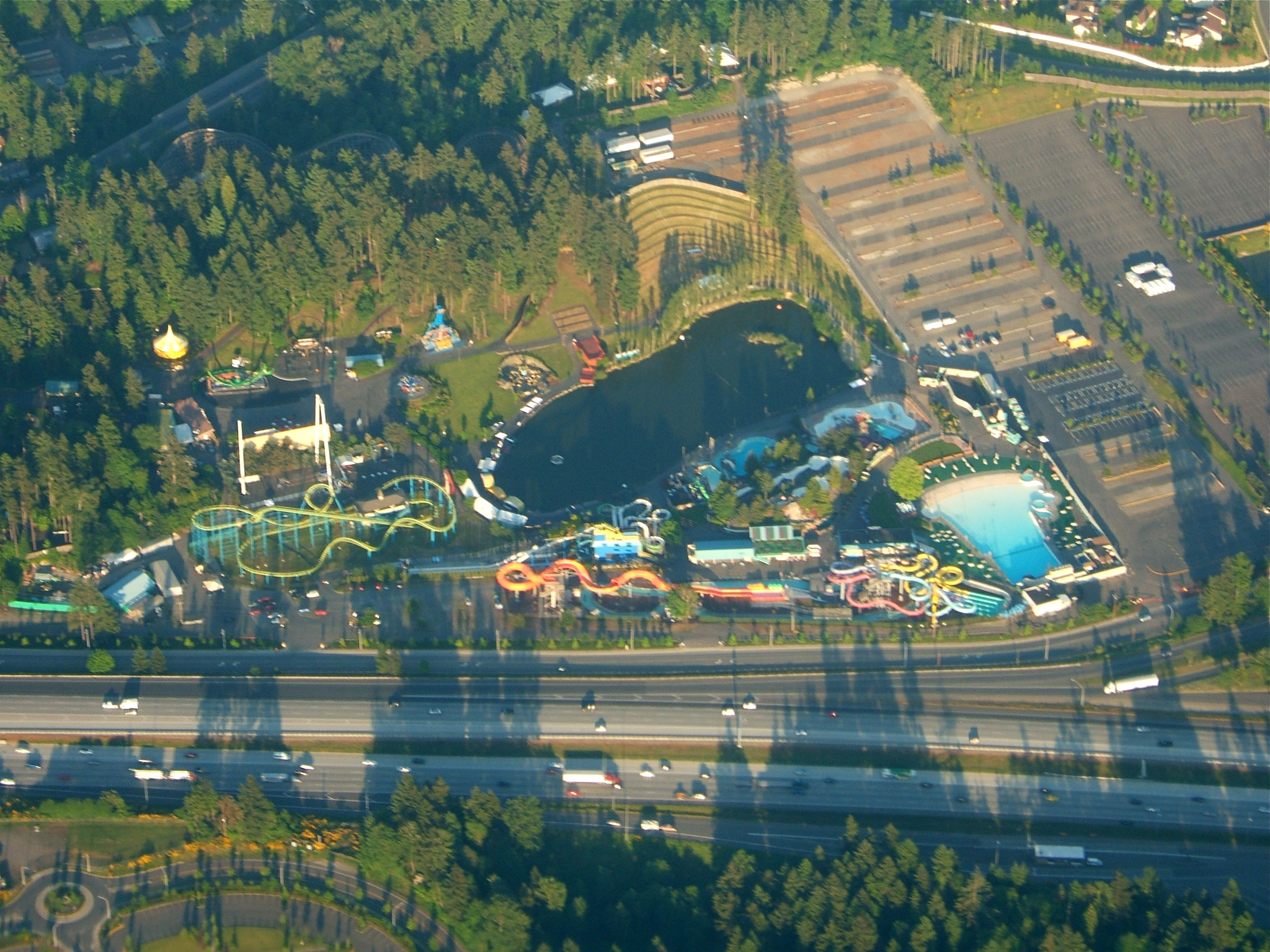
Aerial view, with the large Wave Pool visible to the right

In April 2007, Six Flags sold the park to Orlando-based real estate investment trust CNL Income Properties, which leased the park to PARC Management.

In January 2010, PARC Management had defaulted on its lease with CNL for Wild Waves and a majority of its other parks. Wild Waves was then placed under the new management of Norpoint Entertainment (owned by previous Wild Waves owner Jeff Stock). Stock implemented many changes to the park in 2011 including a new water ride for that season.

With the CNL Income Properties acquisition, the park was named Wild Waves Theme & Water Park. Other parks owned by CNL included Darien Lake Theme Park Resort, Elitch Gardens, Frontier City, SplashTown Waterpark, White Water Bay, and Waterworld California, all of which were bought in a $312 million purchase from Six Flags.

In November 2016, Wild Waves and the other CNL properties were sold to EPR Properties, based in Kansas City, Missouri. The total price of all the properties was $456 million, although there was no specific price disclosed for Wild Waves. The parks were placed under the management of Premier Parks, LLC.

=== August 2016 drowning accident ===
On August 20, 2016, a 33-year-old man died in the Activity Pool due to drowning. A police report noted multiple missed chances to attempt a rescue. According to the report, children reported a body at the bottom of the pool to a lifeguard, who "believed that they were pranking him and did not think anything of it." In a statement released by police, Wild Waves said they actively reviewed the accident, their safety protocols, and the actions taken by staff.

=== Final season ===
The compounded financial losses and operational costs following the pandemic years eventually led to the park's permanent closure announcement. On December 10, 2025, Premier Parks, LLC announced that 2026 would be the final season of operation for Wild Waves. The park reopened on May 23, 2026 as scheduled. The water park permanently closed on September 7, 2026, and the remainder of the park also permanently closed to the public on November 1, 2026. The park is currently planned to be replaced with a 1-million-square-foot (9.3 ha) warehouse.

== Rides ==
=== Roller Coasters ===
Roller Coaster	Opened	Manufacturer	Type
Wild Thing	1997	Arrow Dynamics	Loop and Corkscrew
Kiddie Coaster	1997	Zamperla	Single Helix Powered Coaster
Klondike Gold Rusher	2002	Zamperla	Zig-Zag Coaster
Timberhawk: Ride of Prey	2003	S&S	Wooden Coaster

=== Water rides ===
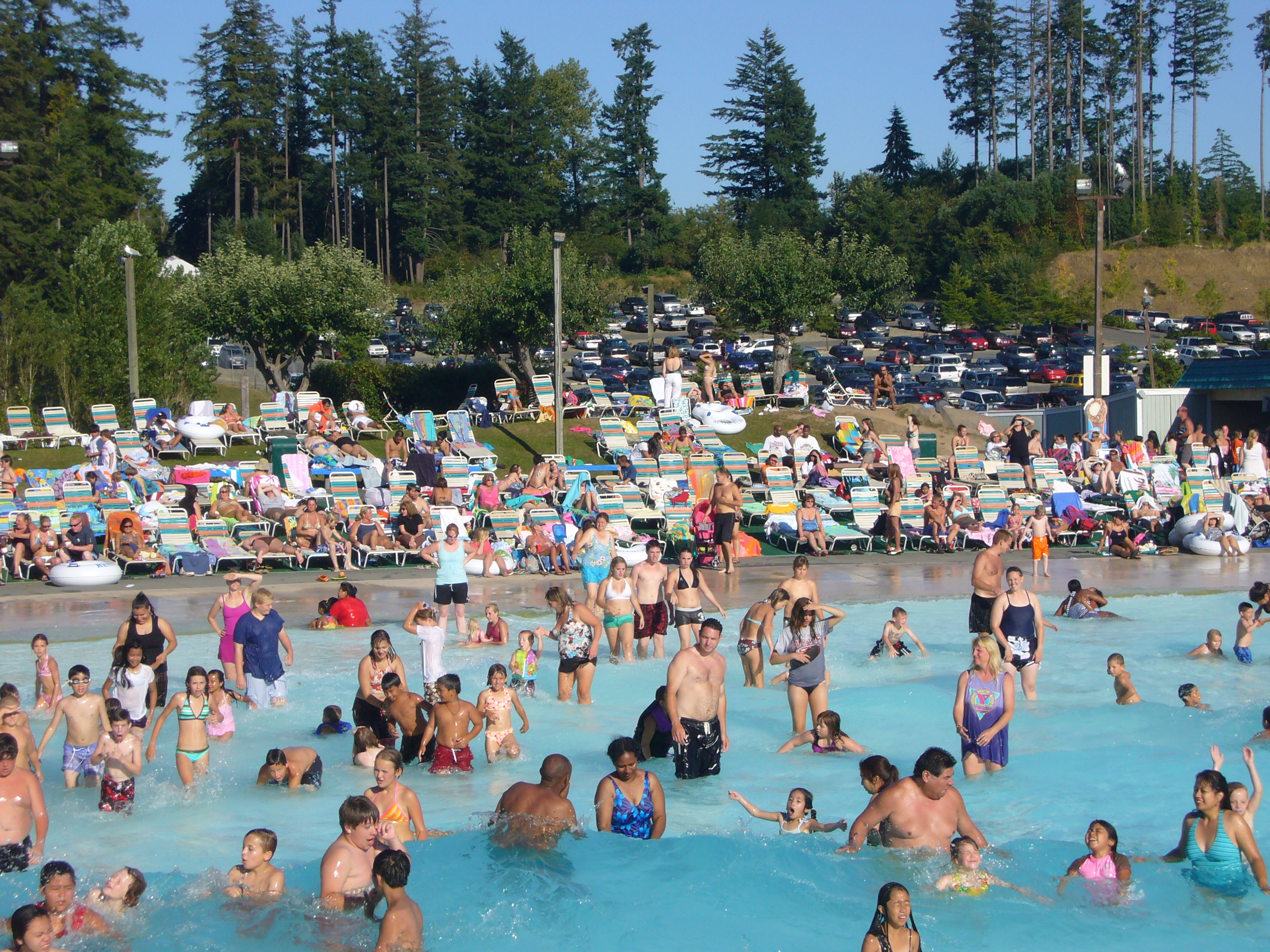
Wave Pool

- Konga Slides
- Konga River
- Wave Pool
- Hooks Lagoon
- Activity Pool
- Zooma Falls
- Raging River Ride
- Riptide
- Pacific Plunge Slide Complex (formerly called Mountain Dew Slide Complex)

=== Thrill rides ===
Name	Opened	Manufacturer	Model	
Disk'O	2008	Zamperla	Disk'o Coaster	
Soarin' Eagle Zip Line	2010	Soaring Eagle	Zip Line (additional cost)	
Brain Drain	2016	S&S - Sansei Technologies	Double Shot	Hawk

=== Family rides ===
Name	Opened	Manufacturer	Model
Dodg’ems Bumper Cars	1977	Soli of Italy	Bumper Cars
Antique Carousel	1977	Philadelphia Toboggan Company	Carousel
Ferris Wheel	1977	Eli Bridge Company	Ferris Wheel
Scrambler	1977	Eli Bridge Company	Scrambler
Pirate Ship	1999	Chance Morgan	Pirate Ship
Hang Glider	2005	Zamperla	Kite Flyer
Kang-A-Bounce	2008	Zamperla	Jump Around

=== Kiddie rides ===
Name	Opened	Manufacturer	Model
Enchanted Railway	1977	Chance Rides	Train Ride
Red Baron	1977	Allan Herschell Company	Red Baron
Kiddie Boats	1977	Allan Herschell Company	Boat ride
Coastal Clipper	2000	Zamperla	Rockin' Tug
Frog Hopper	2001	S&S - Sansei Technologies	Frog Hopper
Kiddie Combo	2005	Zamperla	Jump Around

=== Former Attractions ===
- Lumberjack Falls (Closed Summer 2026)
- Timber Axe (Closed 2025)
- Safari Jeeps (Closed 2025)
- Gambler (Closed)
- Wagon Train (Closed)
- I-5 Dive Skycoaster (Closed 2020)
- Warming Tubs (Closed 2020)
- Ring of Fire (Closed 2020)
- Space Racer (Closed 2020)
- Downhill Tubin' (Closed 2020)
- The Paratrooper (Closed 2020)
- Tip Top (Closed 2018)
- Hydro Slides and Green Slides (Closed 2014) Later replaced by Pacific Plunge Slides in 2015.
- Octopus ride (Closed 2013)
- Falling Star (Closed 2011)

=== Attractions announced but never built ===
- The Enterprise (construction began but was halted for an unknown reason, does not operate today, planned to be in the ride area below Soarin' Eagle Zip Line, Announced 2016, as of 2025, has not opened)
- Shark Frenzy (Announced 2020, but was halted due to COVID)

== Services ==
- Cabana rentals
- Locker rentals
- Tube rentals
- Lost and found
- First aid
- ATM

== Gallery ==
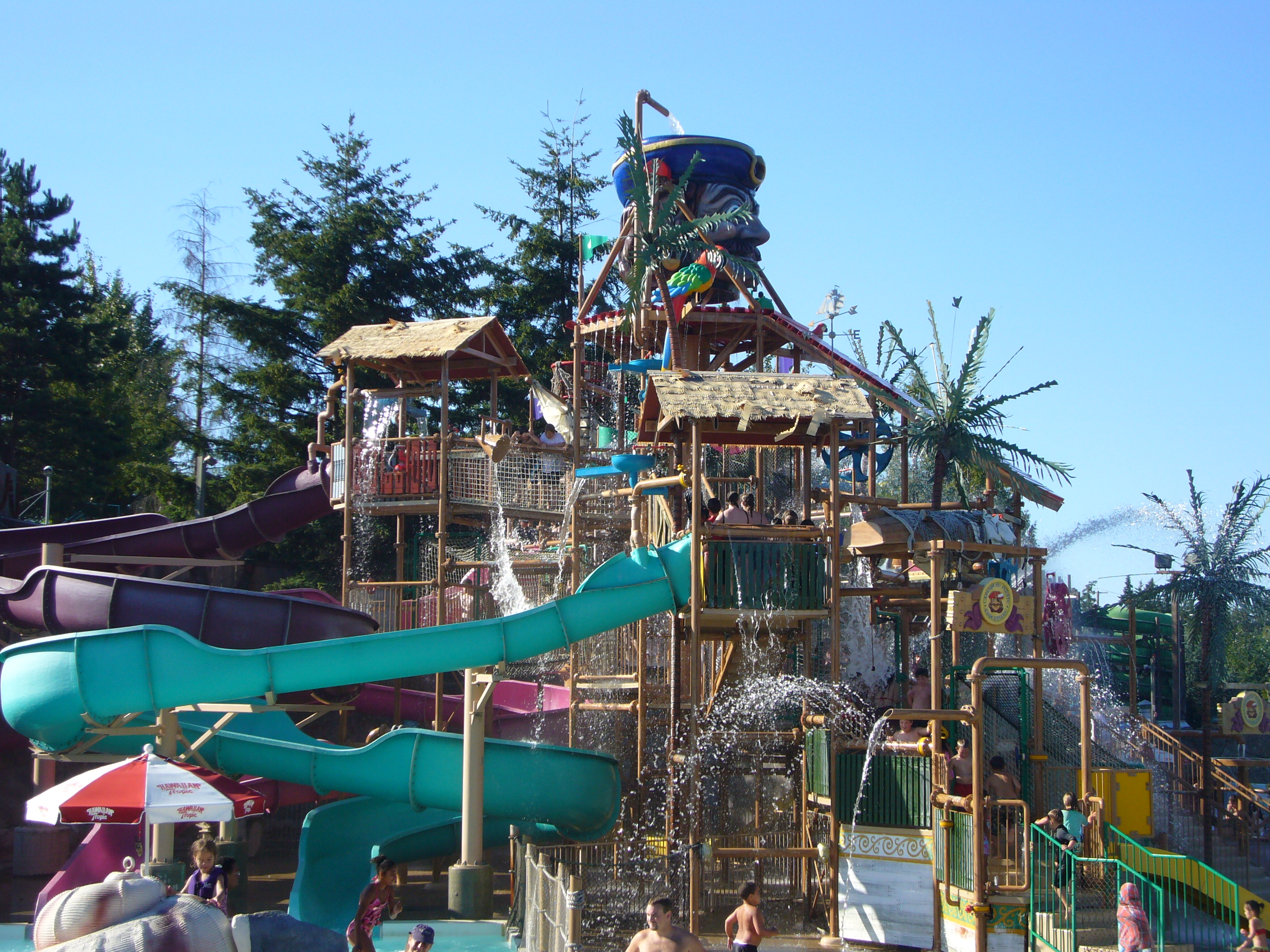
Hooks Lagoon

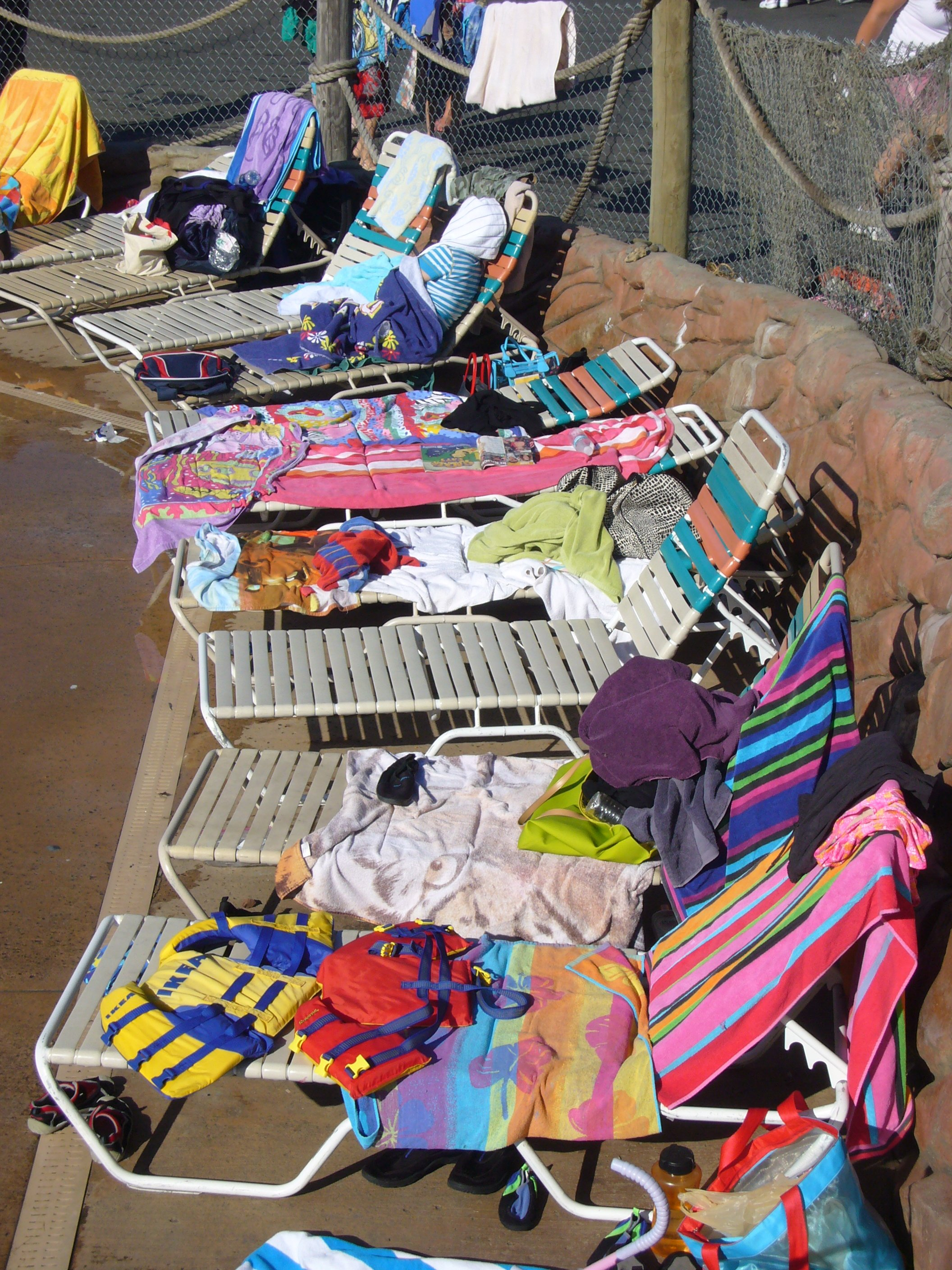
Lounge chairs (have since been replaced)
