= PARC Management =

Amusement park operations company

- Type: LLC
- Industry: Amusement park owner and operator
- Headquarters: Jacksonville, Florida, United States
- Number of locations: 1
- Key people: Randal Drew Chairman & CEO
- Website: http://www.parcmanagement.com

PARC Management, LLC is an amusement operations company based in Jacksonville, Florida, which currently operates a handful of family entertainment centers and water parks in the United States.

== Properties ==
=== Theme Parks ===
Park	Location	Year Opened	Year Acquired	Former Owner(s)/Operator	Notes
Darien Lake Splashdown at Darien Lake	Darien, New York	1954	2007	Funtime Parks (1983–1995); Premier Parks/Six Flags (1995–2007)	Purchased from Six Flags Inc. in 2007; Includes hotel, campgrounds, and Performing Arts Center; Currently operated by Six Flags for EPR Properties.
Elitch Gardens	Denver	1890	2007	Premier Parks/Six Flags (1996–2007)	Purchased from Six Flags Inc. in 2007; Currently operated by Premier Parks for KSE Radio Ventures, LLC.
Frontier City	Oklahoma City	1958	2007	Premier Parks/Six Flags (1982–2007)	Purchased from Six Flags Inc. in 2007; Currently operated by Six Flags for EPR Properties.
Magic Springs and Crystal Falls	Hot Springs, Arkansas	1978	2008	Theme Parks, LLC	Currently operated by Premier Parks for EPR Properties.
SplashTown Houston	Houston, Texas	1984	2007	Premier Parks/Six Flags (1999–2007)	Purchased from Six Flags Inc. in 2007; Currently operated by Six Flags for EPR Properties.
Waterworld California	Concord, California	1995	2007	Premier Parks/Six Flags (1995–2007)	Purchased from Six Flags Inc. in 2007; Currently operated by Six Flags for EPR Properties.
White Water Bay	Oklahoma City	1981	2007	Premier Parks/Six Flags (1991–2007)	Purchased from Six Flags Inc. in 2007; Currently operated by Six Flags for EPR Properties.
Wild Waves Theme Park	Federal Way, Washington	1977	2007	Jeff Stock (privately owned) (1980's-2000); Six Flags (2000–2007)	Purchased from Six Flags Inc. in 2007; Operated by Premier Parks for EPR Properties until permanent closure in 2026.
Myrtle Waves Water Park	Myrtle Beach, South Carolina	1985	2008	Burroughs & Chapin (1997–2008)	Currently operated by Innovative Attractions Management for Lazarus Entertainment Group.
Pavilion Nostalgia Park & Carousel Park	Myrtle Beach, South Carolina		2008	Burroughs & Chapin	Located at Broadway at the Beach.

=== Family Entertainment Centers ===
Park	Location	Year Opened	Year Acquired	Former Owner(s)/Operator	Notes
Camelot Park	Bakersfield, California	1994	2004	Palace Entertainment/Boomers! Parks (2001–2004)	Originally opening as Camelot Park in 1994, it was acquired by Palace Entertainment and rebranded as Boomers! Bakersfield. Later acquired by PARC in 2004 and reverted back to Camelot Park; Currently operating as MB2 Entertainment since 2024.
Fiddlesticks	Tempe, Arizona	1991			Permanently closed in 2011; Redeveloped into a residential apartment complex.
Funtasticks Tucson	Tucson, Arizona	1994	2008	CNL Properties	Currently operated by ProParks Attractions Group.
Mountasia	North Richland Hills, Texas	1994			Permanently closed in 2020; Redeveloped by Merlin Entertainments as a Peppa Pig Theme Park.
NASCAR SpeedPark	Vaughan, Ontario	2004	2008	Burroughs & Chapin (2004–2008)	Permanently closed in 2012; Redeveloped into Calvin Klein and Legoland Discovery Centre.
NASCAR SpeedPark	Hazelwood, Missouri	2003	2008	Burroughs & Chapin (2003–2018)	Located at St. Louis Mills Mall, closed in the 2010s.
NASCAR SpeedPark	Concord, North Carolina	2003	2008	Burroughs & Chapin (2003–2008)	Currently operated by Driving 101, LLC. as "The Speedpark at Concord Mills"
NASCAR SpeedPark	Myrtle Beach, South Carolina	1999	2008	Burroughs & Chapin (1999–2008)	Renamed to "Broadway Grand Prix."
NASCAR SpeedPark	Sevierville, Tennessee	1999	2008	Burroughs & Chapin (1999–2008)	Last remaining NASCAR SpeedPark location as of 2021.
Zuma Fun Center/Funtasticks Charlotte	Charlotte, North Carolina	1991	2005	Whiteco/Celebration Station (1991–2005)	Purchased by Adventure Landing in 2012; Was later acquired back by PARC, rebranding as "Funtasticks Charlotte" in 2018. Permanently closed in Fall 2020 and was demolished in Spring 2022 for a Subaru dealership.
Zuma Fun Center	South Houston, Texas	1992	2005	Whiteco/Celebration Station (1992–2005)	Permanently closed in 2017; the last remaining Zuma Fun Center to operate.
Zuma Fun Center	North Houston, Texas	1992	2005	Whiteco/Celebration Station (1992–2005)	Permanently closed in 2015; Renovated into Decor2Remember.
Zuma Fun Center	Knoxville, Tennessee	1993	2005	Whiteco/Celebration Station (1993–2005)	Permanently closed in 2013; Demolished to become Element by Marriott Knoxville West
