= Premier Parks =

Premier Parks has been used by two amusement park companies:

- Six Flags – Originally founded as Tierco in 1984, became Premier Parks in 1994, purchased the original Six Flags (founded 1961) in 1998, and assumed the Six Flags name
- Premier Parks, LLC – A company formed in 2011 by former Premier Parks executives Gary Story and Kieran Burke
