= VertiGo (ride) =

Defunct thrill ride

Cedar Point
- Area: Challenge Park
- Status: Removed
- Opening date: August 2001
- Closing date: October 2001

Knott's Berry Farm
- Status: Removed
- Opening date: Fall 2001
- Closing date: March 2002

Ride statistics
- Manufacturer: S&S Worldwide
- Model: Absolutely Insane
- Height: 265 ft (81 m)
- Drop: 300 ft (91 m)
- Speed: 50 mph (80 km/h)
- Vehicle type: Triangular car
- Vehicles: 1
- Participants per group: 6
- This is a pay-per-use attraction

VertiGo was a thrill ride located at Cedar Point and Knott's Berry Farm. Both opened in 2001 and were designed by S&S Worldwide. After an offseason incident at Cedar Point in 2002, both rides were removed for the 2002 season.

== Ride experience ==
The ride structure consisted of three 265-foot-tall towers (81 m), placed in a triangular arrangement. The towers were able to sway up to 8 feet (2.4 m) in high winds, or when the ride was in motion. In the center of the towers was a small triangular ride vehicle. The ride vehicle was connected to the top of the towers by three steel cables. Each face of the ride vehicle had two seats, for a total of six riders. The seats were able to pivot, allowing the riders to be rotated forward while the ride was in motion and face the ground or partially invert, depending on the ride mode selected.

At dispatch, the vehicle was lifted a few feet off the ground, and then pneumatic air pressure would launch the riders vertically at 50 miles per hour (80 km/h). At the top, the vehicle would ascend over the peaks of towers, reaching up to 300 feet (91 m). The seats would be able to pivot forward depending on mode in use. The ride operated with three modes available: "Hot Rocket" where riders remained in the upright position throughout the entire cycle; "Cosmic Flip" where they began in the upright position, then as the ride reached its peak height, rotated forward 150 degrees to provide a nose-dive sensation as the ride vehicle descended toward the ground; and "Big Bang" where shortly after launch, riders were quickly flipped forward 150 degrees, rising through the apex and a majority of the return to the ground in the almost upside-down position. Knott's Berry Farm's version had a fourth option: "Big Bang Plus", in which the rotations were all random.

== Incident ==
As part of Cedar Point's preventative maintenance program, the VertiGo ride vehicle was removed and placed in storage for the offseason. On January 14, 2002, one of the 265-foot-tall (81 m) towers suffered a structural failure approximately 65 feet (20 m) up the tower, causing a 200-foot (61 m) section of the tower to fall to the ground. The event occurred while Cedar Point was closed for the winter, and no one witnessed the collapse.

A post-accident investigation by the University of Western Ontario ascribed the problem to vortex shedding, which can occur when wind blows across a cylindrical object for a long period of time under specific weather conditions. Vortex shedding can lead to structural failure resulting from the oscillation of the towers back and forth across the direction of the wind. Confirmation of the analysis occurred a few weeks later, when one of the remaining towers began oscillating 4.5 metres (15 ft). It was determined that had the vehicle remained attached to the towers, it would have absorbed the vibrations and oscillation, preventing the structural failure. An option to hang a heavy chain from the top of the towers was presented as a fix, but the park decided to forego repair. Cedar Fair President Richard L. Kinzel later stated, "We believe the unfavorable perceptions resulting from the incident will negatively impact the popularity of the ride. With the opening of Cedar Point less than two months away and Knott's Berry Farm nearing its peak season, we feel the best decision is to remove the rides from our parks."

Other identical models of the ride continued to operate at other parks, including "Thrill Shot" at Six Flags Magic Mountain. After the Cedar Point VertiGo incident, Thrill Shot’s 265’ towers were reduced in height and reopened with modified operations. That installation was retired in 2012.

"Eruption" at Six Flags Great Adventure closed in 2010, and replaced by a Funtime Slingshot in Spring 2011. At Frontier City it closed in 2012 and was removed in December 2013.
