= Premier Parks, LLC =

American amusement park operator

- Type: Private
- Industry: Amusement park operator
- Founded: 2009; 17 years ago
- Founders: Kieran Burke and Gary Story
- Headquarters: Oklahoma City, United States
- Area served: United States, Canada
- Key people: Kieran Burke (CEO); Susan Hughes (CFO)
- Divisions: La Ronde Operations
- Website: premierparks.com

Premier Parks, LLC (formerly Rapids Holdings, LLC and Premier Attractions Management, LLC) is a limited liability company based in the United States. The company owns and operates several amusement parks and water parks across the US and Canada.

== History ==
The company was founded by Kieran Burke and Gary Story, who had previously worked for more than a decade as chief executive officer and chief operating officer at Six Flags. In November 2009, the pair purchased Nashville Shores, which consisted of a marina, RV park and water park. They redeveloped the water park for the 2010 season. In early 2011, the pair announced that they had purchased the Ocean Breeze Waterpark in Virginia with plans to renovate it for the 2011 season.

They seized an opportunity that arose in late 2010, when CNL Lifestyle Properties terminated its lease agreements with PARC Management for eight parks. They founded Premier Attractions Management, which in 2011 began operating three CNL properties: Frontier City, SplashTown Houston, and White Water Bay Burke and Story later gained operational control of other CNL parks. In 2013, the company changed its name to Premier Parks, LLC, taking the former corporate name of the company that had acquired and taken the name of Six Flags.

In late 2016, CNL sold their attractions portfolio to EPR Properties, which then hired Premier Parks to run them.

In May 2017, operations of Waterworld California were transferred to Six Flags Entertainment Corporation, which had previously owned the park and also own the nearby Six Flags Discovery Kingdom. In May 2018, Six Flags announced that they had entered into a purchase agreement with Premier Parks to acquire the lease rights to operate five other parks: Darien Lake, Frontier City, Wet'n'Wild Phoenix, Wet'n'Wild SplashTown, and White Water Bay.

== Properties ==
Full ownership

- Island H2O Water Park (2019–present)
- Wet'n'Wild Toronto (2016–present)

Operated for EPR Properties

- Nashville Shores
- Ocean Breeze Waterpark
- Calypso Park (2022–present)
- City Museum (2019–present)
- Hawaiian Falls Garland (2021–present)
- Hawaiian Falls Colony (2021–present)
- Magic Springs (2017–present)
- Rapids Water Park (2012–present)
- Valcartier Outdoor Water Park (2022–present)
- Valcartier Indoor Bora Parc (2022–present)
- Wet'n'Wild Hawaii (2014–present)
- Wild Waves Theme Park (2017–2026)
- La Ronde (2026–present)

Operated for Kroenke Entertainment

- Elitch Gardens (2013–present)

== Former properties ==
Full ownership

- Clementon Park and Splash World (2011–2021); Sold at auction on March 23, 2021 to Indiana Beach Holdings, LLC (now known as IB Parks & Entertainment).

Operated for EPR Properties

- Darien Lake (2015–2018); Operations taken over by Six Flags
- Frontier City (2011–2018); Operations taken over by Six Flags
- Pacific Park (2018–2024); sold to SC Holdings
- Waterworld California (2007–2017); Operations taken over by Six Flags
- Wet'n'Wild Palm Springs (2014–2018) Sold to Pono Acquisition Partners I, LLC and closed until the 2020 season.
- Wet'n'Wild Phoenix (2014–2018); Operations taken over by Six Flags
- Wet'n'Wild SplashTown (2011–2018); Operations taken over by Six Flags
- White Water Bay (2011–2018); Operations taken over by Six Flags

Operated for Lucky Strike Entertainment

- Raging Waves Waterpark (2024–2025); Operations taken over by Lucky Strike Entertainment

== See also ==
- Incidents at Premier Parks properties
