= Nashville Shores =

Water park in Tennessee

- Interactive map of Nashville Shores
- Slogan: "From serene to extreme!"
- Location: Hermitage, Tennessee, United States
- Coordinates: 36.15735°N 86.60607°W
- Owner: EPR Properties
- General manager: Larry Edgmon
- Opened: 1998
- Operating season: May–September
- Status: Operating
- Pools: 3 pools
- Water slides: 8 water slides
- Website: NashvilleShores.com

Nashville Shores is a water park, adventure course, and campground located in Hermitage, Tennessee. Nashville Shores is located adjacent to Interstate 40, along the shore of Percy Priest Lake. The site was previously the location of Hermitage Landing, a marina, campground, and recreational complex that opened in 1971. Hermitage Landing closed in 1997, and the Nashville Shores water park opened on the property one year later.

In 2009, Nashville Shores was sold to investors Kieran Burke and Gary Story, two former Six Flags executives. The resort is owned and operated by EPR Properties. Nashville Shores' normal operating season runs from early May to early August. The water park then reopens only on weekends until late September. The park features eight water slides and three pools.

== History ==
=== Hermitage Landing ===
In the summer of 1971, C.E. Hooper and business partner Robert Baltz opened Hermitage Landing, a marina, campground, and recreational complex on the shores of Percy Priest Lake. Hermitage Landing was built on land leased from the United States Army Corps of Engineers, who was responsible for the construction of Percy Priest Lake. The Landing became a very popular destination for tourists and locals; Hermitage Landing also began to host the "One For the Sun" rock festival in 1984, which attracted 11,000 people and would return on a yearly basis.

=== The first decade ===
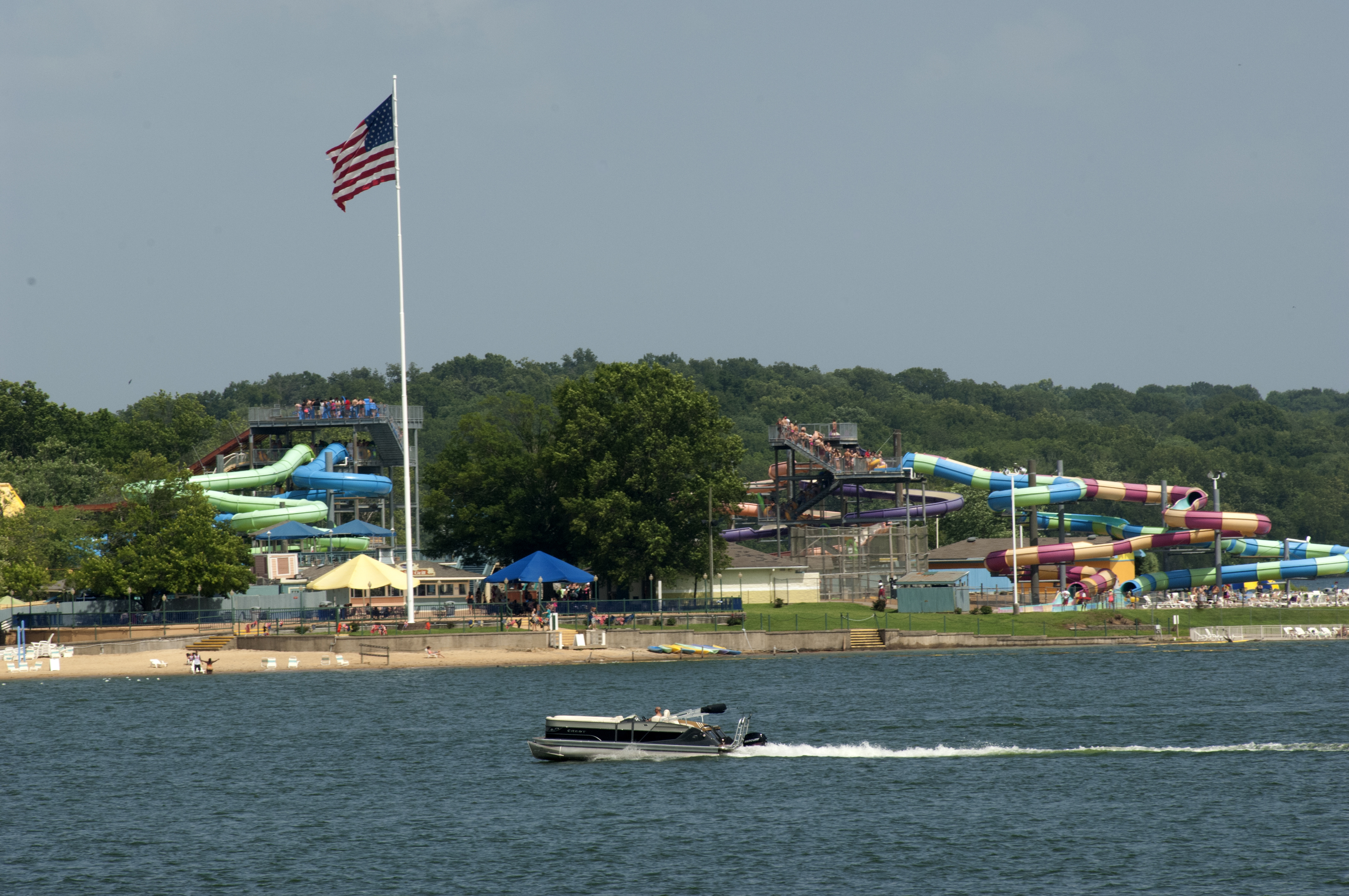
The water park viewed from across the lake

The Hermitage Landing complex closed in 1997, and the Nashville Shores water park opened on the Landing's property the following year, with two waterslides.

In December 2003, Nashville Shores announced plans to build an amusement park to complement their water park, although ownership were having difficulty in getting approval from the U.S. Army Corps of Engineers. Hermitage residents voiced skepticism and opposition about the planned construction of an amusement park, which led to the project being canceled. The Nashville area has not had an amusement park since Opryland Themepark closed in 1997. In 2008, the park opened Music City Racer, a six-lane, 350 foot long, racer slide, with a top speed of 35 mph.

=== Premier Parks era ===
Nashville Shores' attendance declined in 2009, and owner Mike Williams began looking to sell the park. In November, Nashville Shores Holdings, headed by former Six Flags CEO Kirean Burke and former Six Flags executive Gary Story, bought the water park. In December, the new owners announced to new additions to Nashville Shores for 2010; Breaker Bay Wave Pool, a 25,000 square-foot wave pool capable of holding 400,000 gallons of water, and Castaway Creek, a 1,000 foot long lazy river. In early May 2010, shortly before the beginning of the summer season, Nashville Shores was flooded during the 2010 Tennessee floods, however, the park was not seriously damaged and Nashville Shores opened as scheduled later that month.

In December 2010, Nashville Shores announced that the park would open Kowabunga Beach in 2011, a four-story water treehouse with four waterslides, a bucket that spills hundreds of gallons of water every few minutes, and various water play elements. Nashville Shores also renovated the campground and lakeside cabins in 2011. The new additions to campground were new hookups for water, sewer, and electricity, Wi-Fi, a playground, new RV sites, a refurbished bathhouse, a laundromat, a dog park, and other improvements. In 2012, Nashville Shores opened Treetop Adventure Park, an adventure course separate from the water park, featuring suspended bridges, zip lines, and other obstacles. Nashville Shores opened the Big Kahuna in 2015, a $2 million family raft ride that is 57 feet tall, and 530 feet long.

In 2017, Barefootin' Bay, a children's water play structure with mini-slides and a tipping bucket, was added to the water park. To celebrate the water park 20th anniversary, Nashville Shores added the Aqua Park in 2018, an interactive playground on the lake with 40 water elements. The park also improved the beach area, adding new cabanas, more shaded areas, a tiki bar, a beach volleyball court, and more sand. On November 14, 2019, the Nashville Shores announced that they would be adding Mega Mayhem in 2020, the largest waterslide addition in the park's history. Mega Mayhem is a six-story family raft ride from ProSlide Technologies, that features two distinct elements, a tornado funnel and a four-story wall.

On March 24, 2020, Nashville Shores announced that they planned to open the water park on May 16 instead of May 2, as originally scheduled. This change was made due to the COVID-19 pandemic. In May 2020, the park said that they would not open on May 16 or give a specific opening date, but said that they hoped to open in early June. As a result, Nashville Shores also announced that they would be open for an additional week of operation in August and an additional weekend of operation in September. On June 5th, 2020, Nashville Shores announced their reopening on June 10th, 2020.

== Water park attractions ==
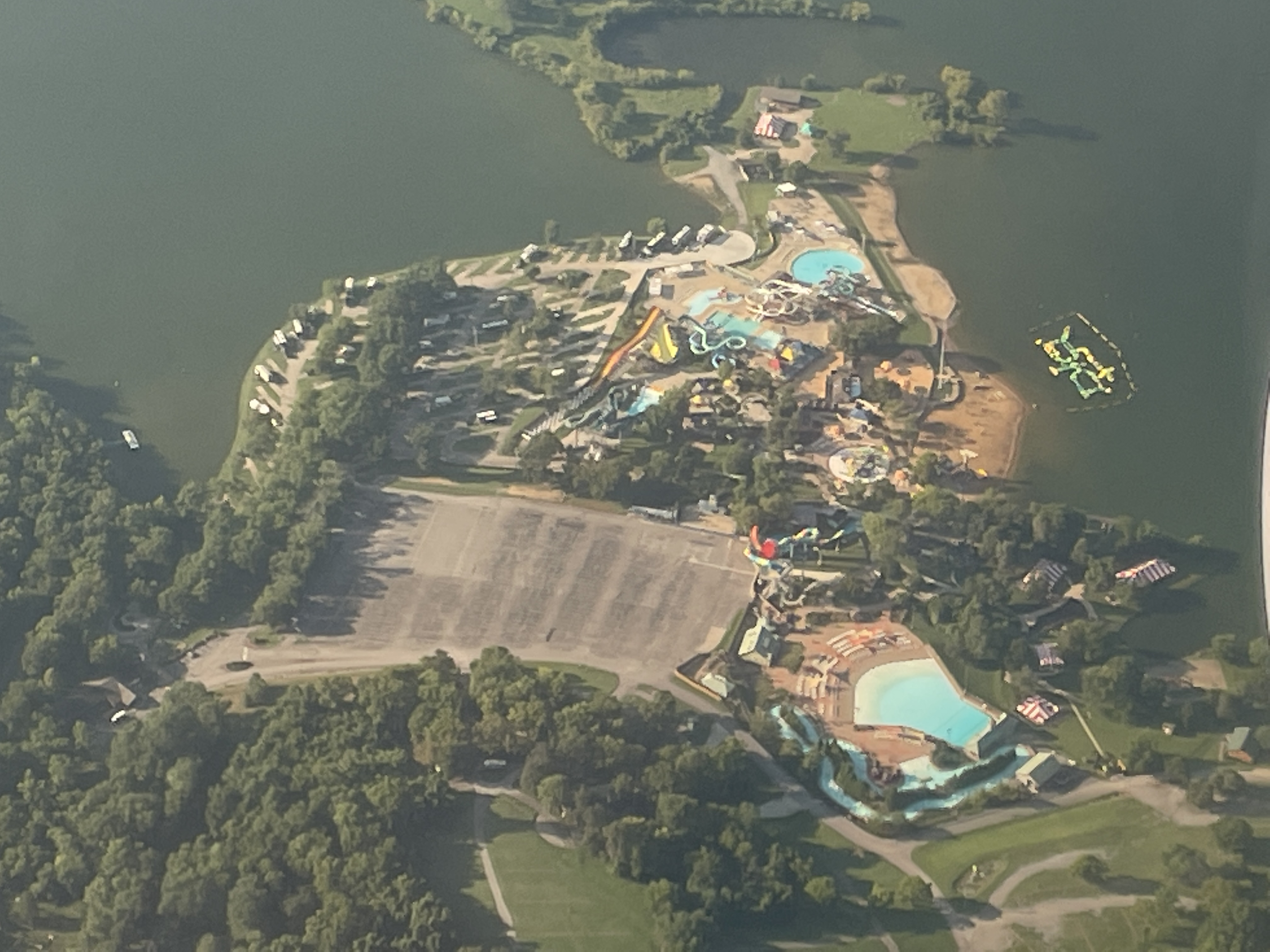
Aerial view of the waterpark

The water park portion of the site includes:

Water rides

- Breaker Bay Wave Pool
- Castaway Creek Lazy River
- Kowabunga Beach
- Giant Bucket of Fun

Water slides

- Big Kahuna
- Riptide Racer
- Big Scream
- Tennessee Twisters
- Thunder & Lightning
- Twin Cyclones
- Mega Mayhem

Pools

- Suntan Lagoon
- Wacky Pond
- Lily Pad Pool

Lakeside attractions

- Banana Boat
- Beach

== Adventure course ==
The Treetop Adventure Park opened in 2012, and includes over 100 woodland obstacles, including zip lines, wall climbing, and rope swings.

== Campground ==
The campgrounds include 84 RV berths and 24 lakeside cabins.

== Marina ==
A marina is located adjecnt to the property.
