= List of incidents at Premier Parks properties =

Incidents that have taken place in parks

This is a summary of notable incidents that have taken place at amusement parks, water parks, or theme parks operated by Premier Parks, LLC. This list is not intended to be a comprehensive list of every such event, but only those that have a significant impact on the parks or park operations, or are otherwise significantly newsworthy.

The term incidents refers to major accidents, injuries, or deaths that occur at a park. While these incidents were required to be reported to regulatory authorities due to where they occurred, they usually fall into one of the following categories:

- Caused by negligence on the part of the guest. This can be refusal to follow specific ride safety instructions, or deliberate intent to break park rules.
- The result of a guest's known, or unknown, health issues.
- Negligence on the part of the park, either by ride operator or maintenance.
- Act of God or a generic accident (e.g. slipping and falling), that is not a direct result of an action on anybody's part.

== Elitch Gardens ==
=== Mind Eraser ===
- On July 11, 1999, a Denver woman sued Premier Parks for injuries sustained on the Mind Eraser roller coaster, including a bloody eye, slurred speech and memory loss. At least 21 other people also complained of injuries received from the ride.

=== The Rainbow ===
- On May 26, 2002, a 28-year-old man with Down syndrome opened his seat restraints and stood while the ride was in motion, subsequently falling to his death. Witnesses reported that he unlatched his seat belt and maneuvered out of the lap restraints.

=== Sidewinder ===
- On August 2, 1997, a 45-year-old female ride operator suffered a fatal fall from the three-story roller coaster platform. She was taken to Denver Health Medical Center where she was pronounced dead. OSHA fined the park over $32,000 as a result.

== Magic Springs and Crystal Falls ==
=== Gauntlet ===
- On August 28, 2005, a maintenance worker got one of his feet stuck in the tracks of the Gauntlet roller coaster. He was freed by a metal cutting saw.

=== Old No. 2 Logging Co. Log Flume ===
- On September 4, 2006, an 11-year-old boy was injured when a stray .22 caliber bullet struck him in the wrist. Police had no suspects in the case.

=== Twist and Shout ===
- On July 30, 2006, a 45-year-old woman from Memphis, Tennessee fell from the Twist and Shout coaster due to centripetal force. The victim fell about 11 feet (3 m), and was taken to a local hospital. Inspectors said that the victim was too large for the ride, causing the restraints to not work properly. A report by the Arkansas Department of Labor stated that the ride operator should not have let her occupy more than one seat on the ride. The victim sued the park and the ride's importer for US$16 million, claiming that the park failed to seat her properly, and that the ride did not provide adequate safety features.

=== X-Coaster ===
- On June 9, 2007, a bird or other large animal crossed electrical wires in nearby Hot Springs, Arkansas, triggering a 25-minute power outage to the park, which caused many of its rides to shut down. Twelve riders on X-Coaster were left hanging upside down 150 feet (46 m) above the ground for 30 minutes until their rescue by the local fire department which used a generator to power the ride so the vehicle could coast to a lower access point. Riders on other attractions were evacuated by park employees without incident. Nausea was the primary complaint of the rescued X-Coaster riders, although one 37-year-old X-Coaster rider was taken to the hospital complaining of neck pain and a headache.
- On July 24, 2017, passengers were stuck on the roller coaster for an hour in 95 °F (35 °C) heat. No injuries were reported.

== Rapids Water Park ==
=== Big Surf ===
- On April 6, 2013, a 5-year-old boy was unresponsive and nearly drowned while playing in the wave pool. He was revived and conscious when paramedics arrived and was taken to a local hospital. Further information on his recovery was not published.

== Wet'n'Wild Toronto ==
=== Incidents involving guests ===
- On July 23, 2025, Peel Regional Police was called to the waterpark after a woman was violently assaulted by 2 suspects after an altercation while in line for a waterslide. A 30-year-old from Brampton was arrested as a result of the assault.

== Wild Waves Theme Park ==
=== Activity Pool ===
- On August 20, 2016, a 33-year-old man from India was found unconscious and drowned in the Activity Pool. Paramedics performed CPR but he couldn't be revived and died due to asphyxia. A lifeguard informed police that he believed children who told him about a body at the bottom of the pool were pranking him. The police later responded and said that the park had everything under control.

=== Other incidents involving guests ===
- On October 5, 2019, a 17-year-old was injured after being shot in the parking lot outside the park's entrance during its annual Fright Fest event. The victim was taken to Harborview Medical Center and remained in critical condition.
