= Eruption (ride) =

Thrill ride

Frontier City
- Coordinates: 35.5832°N 97.4421°W
- Status: Removed
- Opening date: April 6, 2003
- Closing date: August 2012

Ride statistics
- Attraction type: Sling Shot
- Manufacturer: S&S Power
- Model: Sky Sling
- Height: 250 ft (76 m)
- Drop: 300 ft (91 m)
- Speed: 50 mph (80 km/h)
- Vehicle type: Triangular car
- Vehicles: 1

Eruption (Stylized as ErUPtion!) was a 250-foot tall S&S Sky Sling slingshot attraction that opened in April 2003 at Frontier City in Oklahoma City, Oklahoma. The same ride opened in spring of 2003 at Six Flags Great Adventure. Standing at 250-feet tall, it was the tallest thrill-ride in Oklahoma. It was the successor to the two S&S Sky Sling VertiGo rides at both Cedar Point and Knott's Berry Farm which were both closed and removed two years prior. It operated at Frontier City until its closure in 2012.

== Opening ==
The addition of the ride was announced in March 2003 by Frontier City. It opened on April 6, 2003.

== Ride description ==
The ride consisted of three 250-foot towers, which stood to support the triangular vehicle in the middle which lifted riders 300 feet in the air. The towers were designed to sway when the vehicle was launched into the air.

== Closure and removal ==
In July 2012, Frontier City announced that the Eruption would permanently close, due to S&S not producing parts for the ride anymore and high maintenance costs. The triangular vehicle was removed and moved to a different part of the park. The ride was left standing but not operating for a full year. Dismantling and removal of the ride began in December 2013. Two years prior, the Eruption at Six Flags Great Adventure closed in 2010, dismantled in spring 2011 and was replaced by the now common Funtime Sling Shot ride.
