= Steel Lasso =

Inverted roller coaster at Frontier City

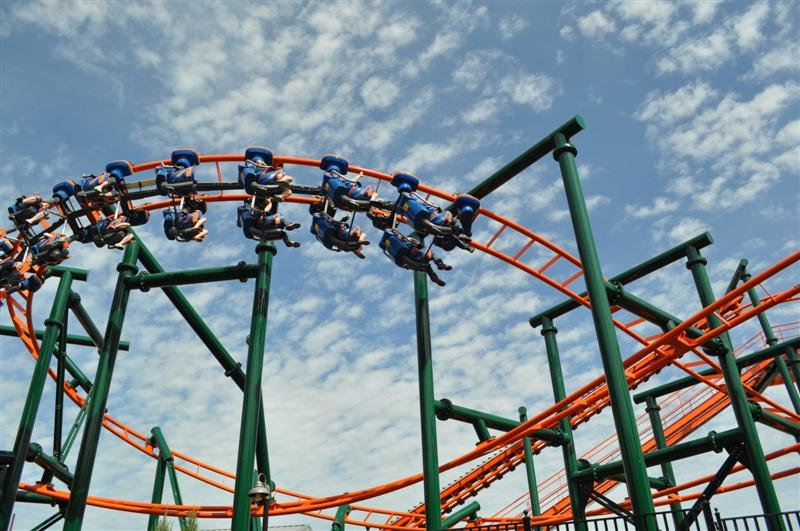

Frontier City
- Location: Frontier City
- Coordinates: 35.583785°N 97.440523°W
- Status: Operating
- Opening date: July 18, 2008; 18 years ago
- Cost: $4,000,000 USD

General statistics
- Type: Steel – Suspended Family Coaster
- Manufacturer: Chance Morgan
- Designer: Vekoma
- Model: Suspended Family Coaster (293m)
- Height: 14.9 m (49 ft)
- Length: 293 m (961 ft)
- Speed: 48.3 km/h (30.0 mph)
- Inversions: 0
- Duration: 43 Seconds
- Capacity: 845 riders per hour
- G-force: 2.2
- Height restriction: 38 in (97 cm)
- Fast Lane available
- Steel Lasso at RCDB

Steel Lasso is an suspended roller coaster at Frontier City theme park in Oklahoma City, Oklahoma. It opened in 2008 for the park's 50th anniversary celebration. The ride was designed by Vekoma and was made in the United States by Chance-Morgan Rides. It has a double figure eight layout with a clockwise downward helix near the end. Steel Lasso is stopped by a brake run that is built into the station. Steel Lasso is the first and only suspended roller coaster in the state of Oklahoma. The train features simple lap bars that lower from above the riders' heads. Steel Lasso currently has an orange and green paint scheme. The ride is a Suspended Family Coaster.
