= Waterville USA =

Water park in Gulf Shores, Alabama

- Previously known as Waterville U.S.A. - Gulf Shores Station
- Interactive map of Waterville USA
- Location: 906 Gulf Shores Pkwy; Gulf Shores, Alabama 36542, United States
- Coordinates: 30.259°N 87.686°W
- Status: Operating
- Opened: December 31, 1986; 39 years ago
- Owner: Joe Warrington
- General manager: John Turberville
- Operating season: Year-round
- Area: 20 acres (0.081 km^{2})

Attractions
- Total: 18
- Water rides: 12
- Website: Official website

Waterville USA, often called simply Waterville, is a 20-acre (81,000 m^{2}) water park and amusement park located a quarter-mile from the Gulf of Mexico in the city of Gulf Shores, Alabama. The park opened in 1986, and since has added numerous water and amusement attractions.

== Water park ==
The water park is the original section of the park.

Attraction	Description	Ref.
Crystal Waters Lazy River	Lazy river	
Dune Racer	Six-lane mat racer slide	
FlowRider	Flowriding machine	
Gold Rush	Open-air tube slide	
Great White	Partially enclosed tube slide	
Jet Stream	Enclosed body slide	
North Shore Wave Pool	Wave pool with 3 ft (0.91 m) waves	
Rainbow Falls	Three small body slides	
Screamin' Demon	Single-drop high-speed body slide	
Shrimp Boat Village	Children's water play area with three small body slides	
Triple Dog Dare	Body slide	
WaWa World	Water play area for smaller children	

== Amusement park ==
Attraction	Description	Ref.
Fun Depot	Four children's rides	
Splash N Strike Bowling	Bowling alley	
Starcade	Arcade	
TopGolf Swing Suite	Golf simulator	
Waterville 500	Go-karts	
Waterville Escape House	Escape room games	
Waterville LaunchPad	Jumping pad	
Waterville Mini Golf	36 hole miniature golf course	

== Former rides and attractions ==
Over the years, Waterville has had to remove and replace attractions due to hurricane damage and the passing of time. In September 2004, the eye of Hurricane Ivan passed directly over Gulf Shores and the surrounding areas. Due to the park's close proximity to the coastline, Waterville was severely flooded by storm surges, and experienced high winds that severely damaged two of the water park's attractions. Repairs occurred during 2005 and 2006, and the park fully reopened in 2007 with replacement attractions.

Attraction	Description	Ref.
Black Widow	Tube slide	
Bullet	Water slide	
Cannonball Run	Custom Coasters International wooden roller coaster	
Ejection Seat	Slingshot ride	
House of Bounce	Bounce area	
Hurricane	Tube slide	
Kamikaze	Body slide	
Lazer Tag	Laser tag	
