= Aqua Planet (water park) =

Water park in Pampanga, Philippines

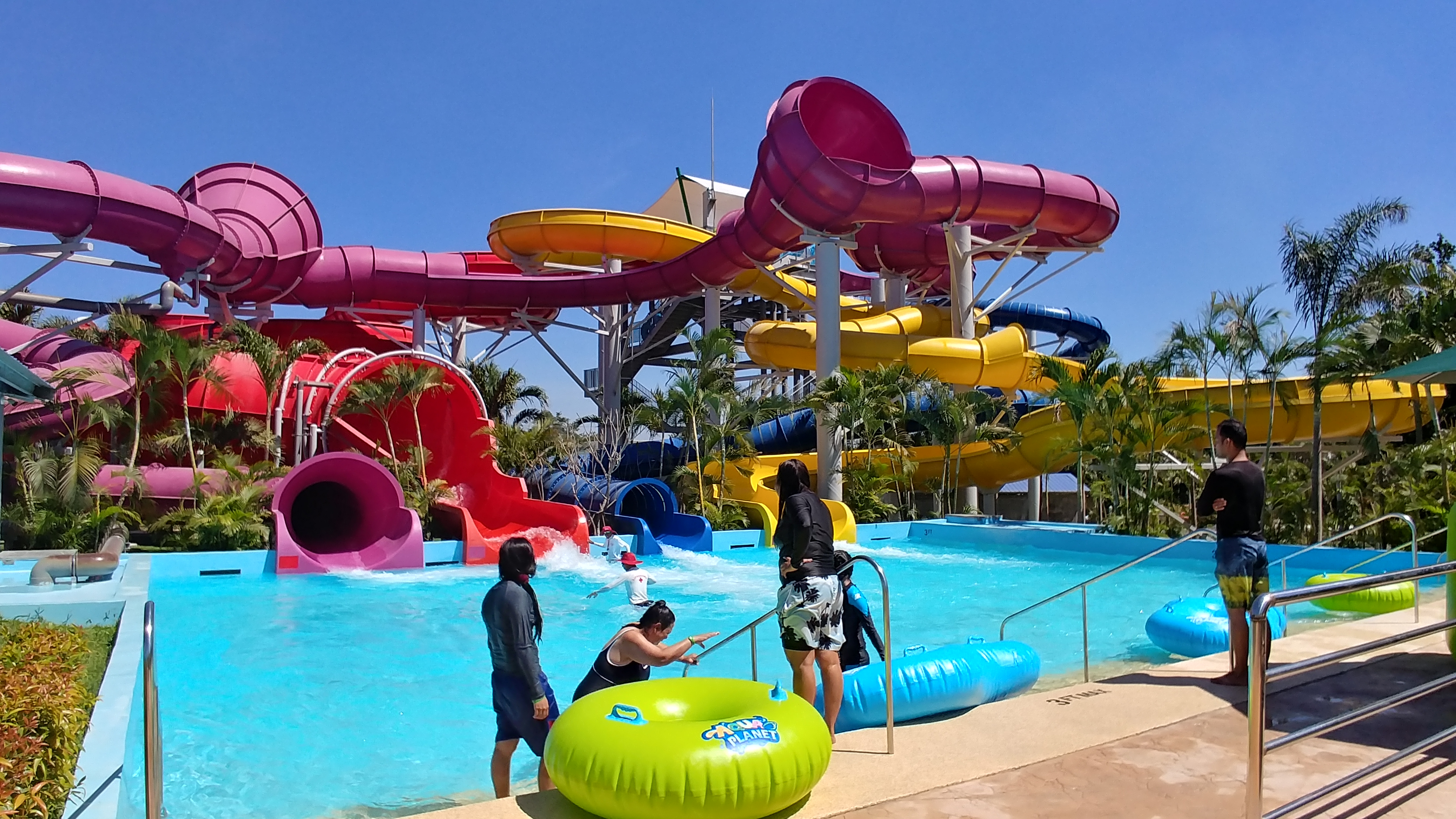
- Slogan: WatermazingExperience
- Location: Clark Freeport Zone, Pampanga
- Coordinates: 15°18′51″N 120°49′51″E
- Owner: BB International
- Opened: February 24, 2018; 7 years ago
- Status: Operating
- Area: 10 ha (25 acres)
- Website: www.aquaplanet.ph

Aqua Planet is a water park at the Clark Freeport Zone in Pampanga, Philippines. It is the largest water park in the Philippines.

== Background ==
Aqua Planet is a water park located in the northwest portion of the Clark Freeport Zone, which is mostly in Mabalacat, Pampanga. It is the largest water park in the Philippines; covering an area of 10 hectares (25 acres). It cost ₱2.5 billion to build. The water park is a joint venture of BB International Leisure and Resort Development Corporation (BBI), Eaglesky Technology Amusement and Gaming, and Central Summit International.

== History ==
=== Development ===
Filipino-Taiwanese firm BB International Leisure and Resort Development Corporation (BBI) was given the rights to develop 122 hectares (300 acres) of land in Clark, part of which was later developed into Aqua Planet. The waterpark was designed by Taiwanese architects and engineers, including a professor from Harvard University.

=== Construction and opening ===
The groundbreaking ceremony for Aqua Planet was held on October 5, 2013 and was projected to be operational by December 2016. The water park first became operational on November 23, 2017, receiving a three-day soft opening and lighting ceremony. Aqua Planet had its commercial opening on February 24, 2018.

== Facilities ==
Aqua Planet has a daily guest capacity of up to 5,000 people with its 38 water slides and other attractions. It also hosts two wave pools; one for children and another for adults. The attractions were designed and developed by the Aquatic Development Group.

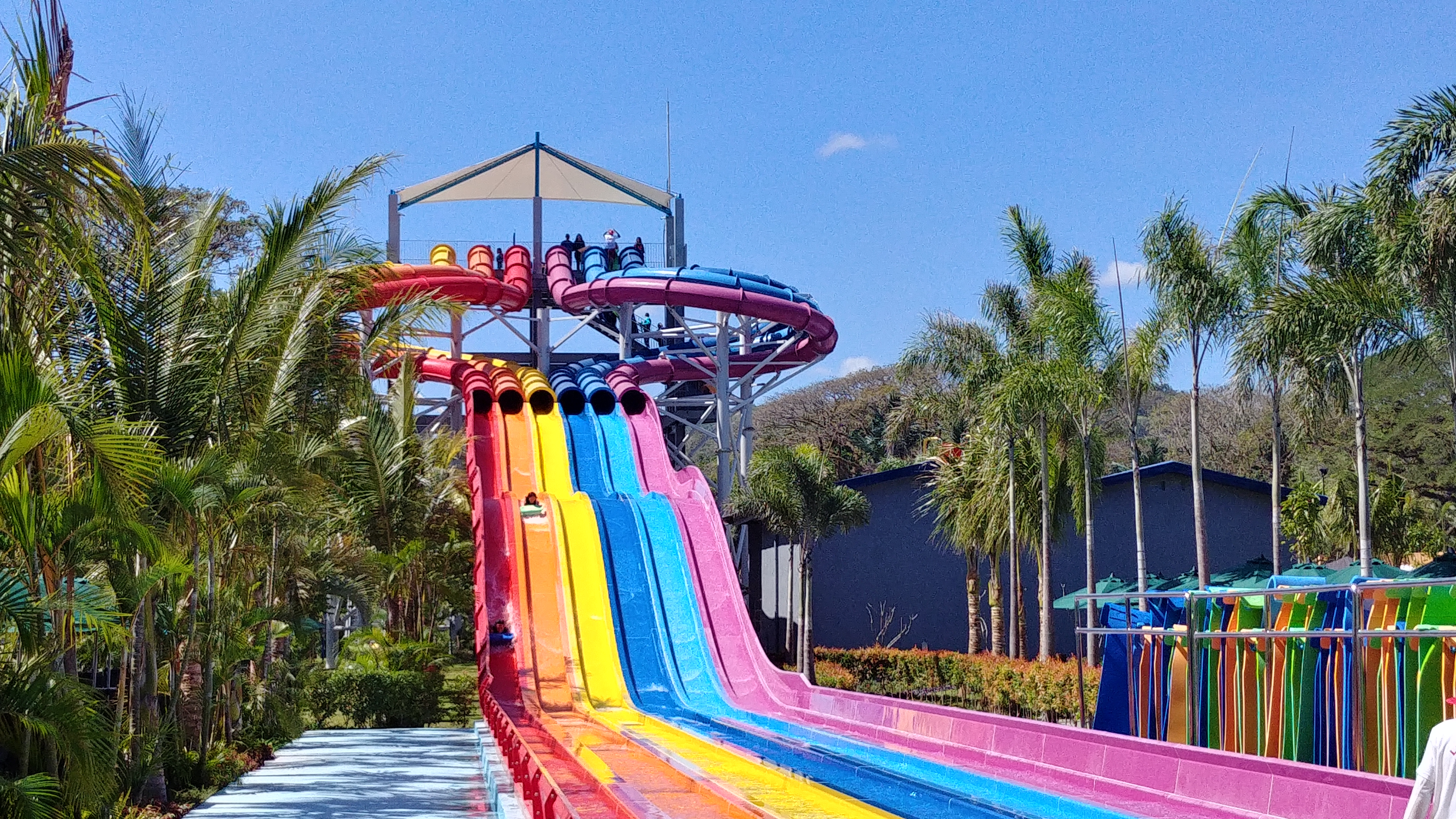
A long water slide inside Aqua Planet

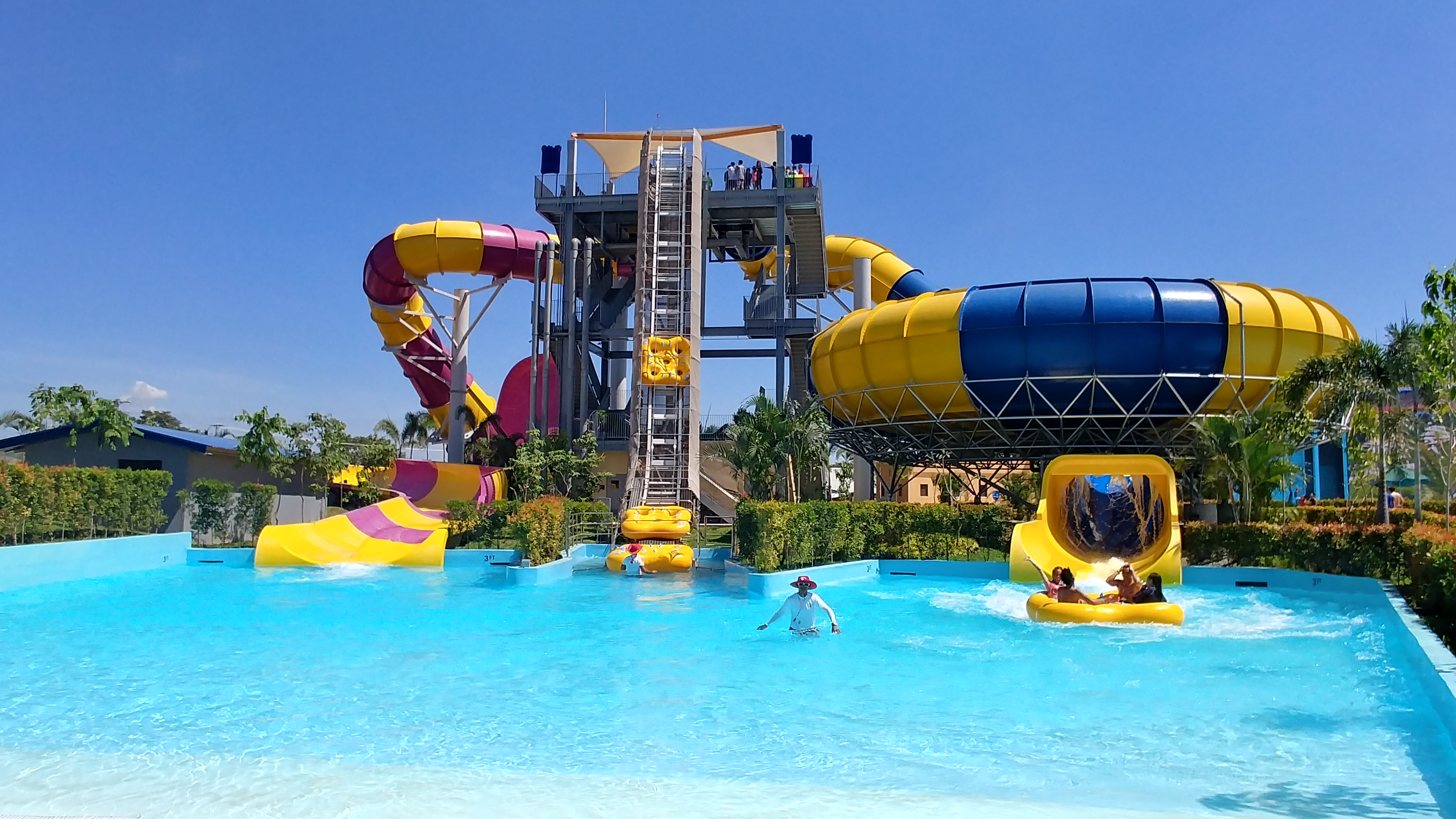
A giant funnel slide inside Aqua Planet
