= Six Flags Hurricane Harbor Concord =

Water park in Concord, California

- Previously known as Waterworld USA Concord (1995–2004); Six Flags Waterworld Concord (2005–2006); Waterworld California (2007–2017)
- Logo used since 2025
- Interactive map of Six Flags Hurricane Harbor Concord
- Location: Concord, California, U.S.
- Status: Operating
- Opened: 1995
- Owner: EPR Properties
- Operated by: Six Flags Entertainment Corporation
- Slogan: Bay Area's Largest Water Park
- Operating season: May through September

Attractions
- Total: 19 waterslides, 6 complexes
- Water rides: 19
- Website: Six Flags Hurricane Harbor Concord

Six Flags Hurricane Harbor Concord is a seasonal water park located in Concord, California. It was initially developed, owned, and operated by Premier Parks. It is currently owned by EPR Properties and operated by Six Flags.

== History ==
The park was originally opened as Waterworld USA Concord in 1995. It was the sister park to the nearby Waterworld USA Sacramento. On October 25, 1996, Premier Parks announced that they would purchase both parks from FRE, Inc. for an undisclosed amount. Following the purchase of Marine World Africa USA (now Six Flags Discovery Kingdom), which was located between both parks, this made for deals so that season passes to Marine World also worked at the Waterworld USA parks.

After Premier Parks purchased the Six Flags chain in April 1998 and eventually rebranded as Six Flags, Inc. in 2000, a majority of the parks owned by the company went under the Six Flags brand. Both Waterworld USA parks remained under their original names, being deemed as "Members of the Six Flags Family". In February 2005, Six Flags announced that the park would be renamed as Six Flags Waterworld Concord for the 2005 season.

In June 2006, the park was one of eight properties put up for sale by Six Flags. On January 11, 2007, PARC Management purchased the park alongside six other properties for $312 million, of which they transferred ownership to CNL Lifestyle Properties and began operating the parks for CNL, of which the park ditched the Six Flags brand and was renamed Waterworld California. The sister park, which ditched the Six Flags brand for the 2006 season and became simply Waterworld Sacramento, separated after Six Flags announced in April 2006 that it would not renew its lease with the park's owners.

Beginning in 2009, Palace Entertainment began to operate the park for CNL. In November 2016, CNL sold its recreational assets, including Waterworld, to EPR Properties. Palace Entertainment continued to manage Waterworld. Premier Parks, LLC. reacquired managing Waterworld California in January 2017 and on April 27, 2017, Six Flags announced it would take over the park's operations from Premier Parks, LLC., reverting the operations back to its former owner. On February 22, 2018, Six Flags announced the name of the park would change to Six Flags Hurricane Harbor Concord.

Due to the COVID-19 pandemic, Six Flags announced a suspension of operations across the company on March 13, 2020. In early August, the water park announced on their social media that the 2020 operating season had been canceled for the year due also to closure of theme parks because of two stay-at-home orders issued by California Governor Gavin Newsom. This was the first season for the water park to not operate since its inception in 1995. On May 22, 2021, the park reopened to members and one week later, the general public was also welcomed back.

== Incident ==
On June 2, 1997, the Banzai Pipeline collapsed after a group of seniors from Napa High School on a graduation outing attempted to set a school record for "clogging" the water slide, entering it in a closely-spaced group. A 20-foot (6.1 m) section gave way and students fell more than 30 feet (9.1 m) onto concrete, some colliding with wooden supports. Thirty-two were injured, two with fractured vertebrae, and 18-year-old Quimby Ghilotti died. The fiberglass slide was reported to have been subjected to three times the weight for which it was designed. Previous classes had performed the stunt several times without incident at Manteca Waterslides, where the slides were built into a hillside. The incident was featured on an episode of Dateline. Premier Parks, the parent company of Waterworld; the designer and builder of the slide; and Napa Valley Unified School District paid a combined $4 million in settlements to the families of the 33 students.

== Rides ==
- Big Kahuna - A WhiteWater West Family Raft Ride, opened 1999
- Break Point Plunge - 2 ProSlide SuperLOOP launch capsule slides, opened 2015
- Breaker Beach - Wave Pool, opened 1995
- Caribbean Cove - Kids Play Area previously named Treasure Island, opened 2018
- Honolulu Halfpipe - A Waterfun Products Sidewinder, Opened 2002
- Kaanapali Kooler - Lazy River, opened 1995
- Splashwater Island - A WhiteWater West RF4RB kids play structure, opened 2018
- Tornado - ProSlide Tornado 60 Slide, opened 2005
- Typhoon Slide Complex - 4 Two Person WhiteWater West Tube Slides, opened 1995

=== Former Rides ===
- Cliffhanger - 2 Speeds Slides, a WhiteWater West Speed Slide and a Freefall Plus, opened 1995. Closed in 2019 and demolished in 2022 due to part of the structure breaking and the ride being deemed unsafe to operate.
- Diablo Falls - WhiteWater West Drop Slide into pool, opened 1996, closed in 2017
- Dragon Tails - WhiteWater West Family body slides removed in 2017 for Splashwater Island
- Hurricane Slide Complex- 4 Body Slides, 2 WhiteWater West AquaTubes and 2 Giant Slides. Opened 1995, removed in 2024.
- Lil' Kahuna's Waterworks - Small kids play area that was removed in 2017 for Splashwater Island
- Treasure Island - SCS Interactive water playground that was removed in 2017 for Caribbean Cove
