= Six Flags Hurricane Harbor Splashtown =

Water park in Spring, Texas

- Interactive map of Six Flags Hurricane Harbor Splashtown
- Slogan: Houston's Largest Water Park
- Location: Spring, Texas, U.S.
- Coordinates: 30.070167°N 95.431935°W
- Owner: EPR Properties
- Operated by: Six Flags
- Opened: 1987
- Previous names: SplashTown USA; SplashTown Houston (-2005); Six Flags SplashTown (2005–2006); SplashTown Houston (2008–2012); Wet 'n' Wild Splashtown (2013–2018)
- Operating season: May–September
- Area: 48 acres (190,000 m^{2})
- Pools: 2 pools
- Water slides: 9 water slides
- Children's areas: 2 children's areas
- Website: Six Flags Hurricane Harbor Splashtown

Six Flags Hurricane Harbor Splashtown is a water park located north of Houston in Spring, Texas, United States.

== History ==
The land that Six Flags Hurricane Harbor Splashtown now occupies was, in the early 1980s, home to a theme park known as Hanna-Barbera Land. Hanna-Barbera Land only operated for two seasons before its owners, Kings Entertainment Company, sold the park to private investors. The amusement park had all its rides removed, with the new owners installing a water park with several water slides. Much of the park's Victorian buildings, street lights and landscaping remained. Splashtown USA opened to the public shortly after.

In the 1990s, the park changed owners twice: first to the Morris Family in 1994, and then to Six Flags in May 1999. The acquisition was made by Six Flags to eliminate the park from being a competitor to its WaterWorld water park, also located in Houston.

For most of its ownership under Six Flags, the park was listed as "A Member of the Six Flags Family". For the 2005 season, the park was rebranded as Six Flags SplashTown and adorned a new logo.

Following the closure of Six Flags WaterWorld and the adjacent Six Flags AstroWorld in October 2005, Six Flags engaged in a restructuring of Six Flags SplashTown, which resulted in the termination of the park's General Manager, Operations Manager and Food Service Manager in early November 2005. In January 2006, it was announced that the former Operations Manager of WaterWorld would be the new Splashtown Operations Manager. Several of WaterWorld's attractions were relocated to SplashTown. The park underwent a "facelift" as well as general cleaning to prepare it for its opening day, April 28, 2006. The entrance received a new sign, with the addition of renovated buildings and ticket booths.

In January 2007, Six Flags announced that Six Flags SplashTown, along with six other parks, would be sold for a total of $312 million. The agreement saw Six Flags sell the properties to PARC Management, who in turn sold the properties to CNL Lifestyle Properties. CNL would then lease the properties back to PARC Management under a 52-year triple-net lease. However, after less than three years into the 52-year contracts, CNL terminated their agreements with PARC Management in November 2010. In early 2011, CNL appointed Premier Attractions Management, LLC (now Premier Parks, LLC) as the new operators of the park. At the time, the limited liability company was led by former Six Flags employees Kieran Burke, the former chairman and CEO, and Gary Story, the former president and chief operating officer.

In November 2013, CNL Lifestyle Properties acquired rights to the Wet'n'Wild brand in the United States from Australian firm, Village Roadshow Theme Parks. In the months to follow CNL rebranded several of its properties to Wet'n'Wild water parks, including SplashTown Houston, which became Wet'n'Wild SplashTown. The park itself received a multimillion-dollar renovation.

In late 2016, CNL Lifestyle Properties announced that it was selling ownership of fifteen attraction properties, including Wet'n'Wild Splashtown, along with five small family entertainment centers to EPR Properties for approximately $456 million. The transaction was completed in April 2017. Premier Parks LLC remained as the operator.

On May 22, 2018, Six Flags acquired the leasing rights from Premier Parks LLC to manage several parks owned by EPR Properties. Splashtown was renovated in the offseason and in 2019 changed its name to Six Flags Hurricane Harbor Splashtown.

Due to the growing concerns of the COVID-19 pandemic, Six Flags announced a suspension of operations across the company on March 13, 2020. Six Flags Hurricane Harbor Splashtown was scheduled to open for the 2020 season on May 22, but released a new opening date of June 29. On June 26, three days prior to the new opening date, the water park announced that its reopening was delayed indefinitely in order to follow local county government guidelines. In early August, park officials announced that the 2020 operating season had been canceled and that Six Flags Hurricane Harbor Splashtown looks forward to open again in 2021. This would be the first season for the water park to not operate since its inception in 1984. The water park reopened again, the following season on May 1, 2021.

Two months after reopening for the 2021 season on July 17, 2021, over 60 park visitors were exposed to an airborne chemical leak and decontaminated. Six Flags officials stated that a third-party service company improperly installed the water filtration system for an outdoor kiddie pool. After the incident, the park remained closed for inspections until August 5, 2021.
