= Frontier City =

Amusement park in Oklahoma City

- Interactive map of Frontier City
- Location: Oklahoma City, Oklahoma, United States
- Coordinates: 35.5848°N 97.4410°W
- Status: Operating
- Opened: 1958
- Owner: EPR Properties
- Operated by: Six Flags
- Theme: Western "town" Theme Park
- Slogan: The Thrill Capital of Oklahoma
- Operating season: March – October
- Area: 55 acres (220,000 m^{2}); 109 acres (0.44 km^{2}) total

Attractions
- Total: 28
- Roller coasters: 5
- Water rides: 3
- Website: sixflags.com/frontiercity

Frontier City is a western-themed amusement park in Oklahoma City, Oklahoma, U.S. It is owned by EPR and operated by Six Flags. The park opened in 1958. Prior to the company's merger with Cedar Fair, Frontier City was one of only two Six Flags properties, along with La Ronde in Montreal, that were not officially branded as Six Flags parks.

== History ==
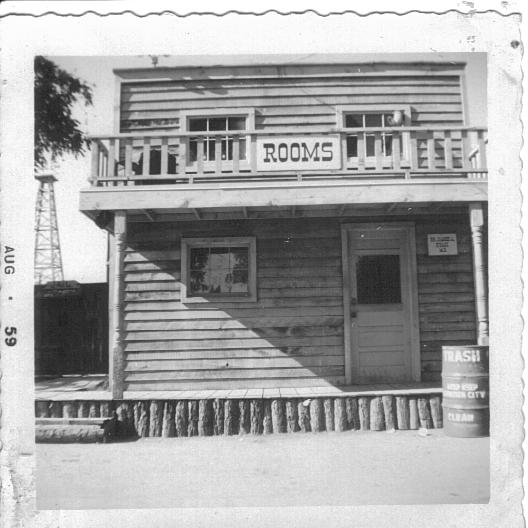
Front of rooming house at original Frontier City location at the Oklahoma State Fair grounds (1959 photograph)

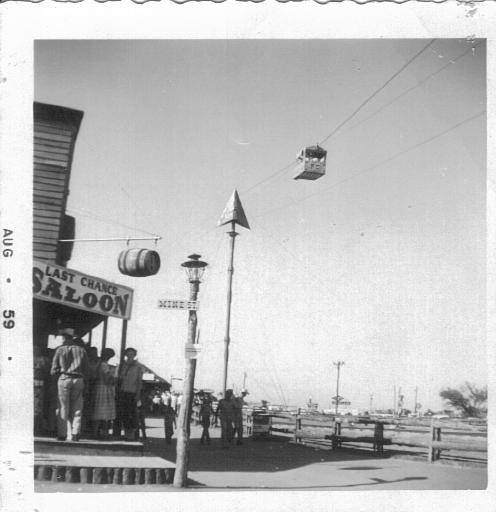
Last Chance Saloon and skyride at original Frontier City location (1959)

=== Burge/Williams era (1958–1981) ===
In 1958, the park opened along Route 66, now Interstate 35. It featured a haunted farm, a mine train, robberies, and jails. Initially, guests entered for free, but had to pay a quarter to watch the gunfight shows. It started out as Boomtown, a replica of an Oklahoma pioneer town that was built for the state's semicentennial celebration in 1957 at the Oklahoma State Fair grounds. Jimmy Burge, the leader of the committee that built Boomtown, decided to open an amusement park with the same theme. Rather than a traditional ribbon cutting, it was scheduled to have an old-fashioned six-shooter aimed at a piece of rope stretched across the stockade entrance. That is the same manner used today for its opening. It added spinning rides, roller coasters, and a log flume ride starting in the 1960s and 1970s.

The park was originally owned and operated by Oklahoma City businessmen James Burge and Jack Williams. James Burge had been a publicist in Hollywood for twenty years, with clients that included Joan Crawford and Robert Taylor. He visited Disneyland when it opened in 1955 and was impressed with the theme park business. Being from Oklahoma City, he knew his hometown would be a natural location for a western-themed amusement park. After World War II, he returned to Oklahoma City and was later appointed to lead the Oklahoma Semi-Centennial Committee, which was planning the 1957 Oklahoma Semi-Centennial Exposition in Oklahoma City.

After the 1957 Exposition was over, he negotiated with the fair board to purchase many of the buildings and props at the "Boom Town" exhibit. Burge laid out the land and facilities with four initial investors, then entered a partnership with Jack Williams, a wealthy businessman who owned a chain of laundries. Although Williams was initially interested in the park's linen rental contract, he was convinced by Burge's vision and became the principal investor. Together, they developed the park as a recreation of an 1880s Western town. Russell Pearson was credited as the architect responsible for building designs and general layouts. The four square blocks of streets contained a Marshall's office, saloon, bank, post office (with its own postmark), fire department, hotel, and numerous storefronts. Attractions at the park included a train ride built by Arrow Dynamics, an authentic stagecoach ride, a donkey ride, and an indoor dark ride designed by Pearson, who later went on to work on Silver Dollar City in Branson, Missouri and Ghost Town in the Sky in Maggie Valley, North Carolina.

The park reported attendance of over one million people each year, although because parking and admission were free, attendance was determined by Burge from the number of train tickets sold, which could have counted the same people multiple times each day. It was famous for its live entertainment, including staged gunfights, Indian dancing, saloon shows, train robberies, and other similar types of Western experiences. The park made money by leasing concessions, and the concessionaires set their own prices; Burge recounted in 1988 that visitors "could walk around free unless [they] got thirsty". Williams set up the offices for his company and Frontier City staff in two surplus cabooses, purchased from the Frisco Railroad, and entertained dignitaries in the Susie Belle, the former Frisco President's Car, which had been declared surplus in 1958. Burge left Frontier City in 1961, and Williams followed in 1975.

=== New management (1981–1987) ===
In the fall of 1981, the Tierco Group, a local real estate company, bought the park with plans to dismantle it and develop the land. However, the oil crunch slowed down the local real estate boom, and the startled company found itself with a sagging amusement park to operate. The president of the company realized Oklahoma City needed a local amusement park but also knew that throwing a few million dollars at the park was not going to be enough to solve its problems. In 1983, the owners hired a management company to operate it. Gary Story was named the general manager in 1984.

=== Tierco Group/Premier Parks/Six Flags era (1987–2006) ===
In 1987, the contract with the management company was not renewed, but the management staff went to work directly for the park owners, Frontier City Properties, a wholly owned subsidiary of Tierco Group, Inc.

In 1995, The Tierco Group, Inc. changed its name to Premier Parks. On February 9, 1998, it was announced that Premier Parks would purchase the Six Flags chain from Time Warner for $1.9 billion and change its name to Six Flags, Inc. The world headquarters for Six Flags were located at the southeast corner of the park's property until 2006, when the company's offices were moved to New York City and Grand Prairie, Texas.

On January 27, 2006, Six Flags put Frontier City and White Water Bay, Six Flags Magic Mountain, Elitch Gardens, Darien Lake, a couple of water parks, and Wild Waves/Enchanted Village for sale. At the same time, it also announced its plan to close its corporate offices in Oklahoma City and move to New York City and Grand Prairie, Texas. Mark Shapiro, Six Flags CEO at the time, said that he expected the parks to continue operating after the sale, but rumours surfaced that some of them could close. The announcement also created a lot of confusion in the Oklahoma City market. Many people misunderstood the announcement, instead thinking that Frontier City was shutting down and relocating to New York.

=== CNL Properties and PARC Management era (2007–2010) ===
On January 11, 2007, Six Flags opted to keep Magic Mountain but then announced that it would sell Frontier City and White Water Bay, along with Elitch Gardens, Darien Lake, Splashtown (near Houston) and Wild Waves/Enchanted Village, to PARC 7F-Operations. As a part of the deal, the Six Flags prefix was removed from Elitch Gardens and Darien Lake. Frontier City and White Water Bay were never branded as Six Flags parks. PARC sold them to CNL Income Properties, Inc. and the two companies set up a long-term agreement in which CNL would lease the parks to PARC, which would operate them.

In 2008, a new suspended roller coaster, Steel Lasso, was added to celebrate the park's 50th anniversary.

On November 24, 2010, CNL Lifestyle Properties, Inc. announced that it had reached an agreement to terminate PARC's lease of the park and up to 17 other locations due to PARC defaulting on its contractual lease and loan obligations. The move came after, according to their 2010 SEC filings, PARC defaulted on their lease obligations on the properties. Five of the original six parks originally purchased from Six Flags are also involved in the lease termination.

=== Premier Parks, LLC era (2011–2016) ===
In 2011, it was announced that as the result of an agreement with owner CNL Lifestyle Properties, former Six Flags executives Kieran Burke and Gary Story would begin managing the properties as Premier Parks, LLC.

In 2012, a new multi-million dollar water play structure was erected in a former parking lot. The area is called Wild West Water Works and features seven slides, a 1,000-gallon tipping water bucket and hundreds of water gadgets.

In 2014, the park turned to Plainview, Texas-based Larson International for the new Winged Warrior ride and again in 2015 for the new Brain Drain, a seven-story looping thrill ride.

Another new attraction was added in 2016 called The Gunslinger, a 60-foot-tall spinning thrill ride made by Italian ride manufacturer, Zamperla. It was relocated from Magic Spring in Hot Springs, Arkansas, a park also owned by CNL Lifestyle Properties, Inc. 2016 also celebrated the 25th anniversary of the Wildcat. Much of the ride was re-tracked in 2016 to make for a smoother ride.

=== EPR Properties/Premier Parks era (2016–2018) ===
After the 2016 season the park was again sold, this time to EPR Properties which was operating it under the name Frontier City Holdings LLC. Premier Parks continued as the management company, with Stephen Ball continuing to act as its general manager.

For the 2017 season, the Wildcat received a complete train makeover with rebuilt cars. A new million dollar water ride was added to the Wild West Waterworks called the Gully Washer, which consists of three high-thrill water slides that will start from a tower approximately 66 feet tall. One of the new shows for the 2017 season performed in the Opera House is called "Shake, Rattle, and Roll," which replaced the show "Industrial Movement" and revisited the music of the 1950s and 1960s.

=== EPR Properties/Six Flags era (2018–present) ===
On May 22, 2018, Six Flags Entertainment Corporation announced that they had entered into a purchase agreement with Premier Parks to acquire the lease rights to operate the park, which would remain under EPR Properties ownership.

Before the start of the 2020 season, Six Flags suspended all operations across all their properties due to the COVID-19 pandemic. After over two months of the park operations being closed, Frontier City became the first park in the company to reopen on June 5, with new health and safety protocols. As of June 2020, Frontier City operations have resumed.

== Special events ==
Frontier City hosts concerts every summer at the Starlight Amphitheater.

=== Fright Fest ===
In 2018, Frontier City debuted "Fright Fest", which had previously been an annual event at the park until 2007. After Six Flags sold the park in 2007, the event was named "FrightFest" without the space to avoid legal issues.

=== Holiday in the Park ===
In 2018, Frontier City debuted "Holiday in the Park," a Christmas event with lights and entertainment throughout the park. "Joe Galbraith, Frontier City's Kris Kringle, gives the park's four-seated sleigh a fresh coat of paint in preparation for a gale round of Christmas Holiday festivities" on November 17, 1959. The event added 27 operating days between November and January, the second time for the park. Prior to Six Flags' re-acquisition of the park in May 2018, the event was to be named "A Frontier Christmas". The event did not return (2023-present).

== Rides and attractions ==
=== Roller coasters ===
Ride	Opened	Manufacturer	Model	Description
Diamond Back	1994	Arrow Dynamics	Launched Shuttle Loop	Relocated from Six Flags Great Adventure to Frontier City in 1993. Was formerly the lower loop of "Lightnin' Loops".
Frankie’s Mine Train	2019	Zamperla	Steel Junior - Single Helix	Brought in for the park's newest area, "Timber Town".
Steel Lasso	2008	Chance Rides / Vekoma	Suspended Family Coaster	Opened in 2008 for the park's 50th anniversary.
Silver Bullet	1986	Anton Schwarzkopf	Looping Star	Relocated from Jolly Roger Amusement Park
Wildcat	1991	National Amusement Devices	Wildcat's track has been modified several times but has retained an Out-And-Back layout.	Relocated from Fairyland Park (Kansas City, MO) in 1991.

=== Thrill rides ===
Ride	Opened	Manufacturer	Model	Description
Rolling Thunder	2015	Larson International	22m Super Loop	Formerly called Brain Drain (2015–2022).
Gunslinger	2016	Zamperla	Power Surge	Relocated from Magic Springs Amusement Park, Arkansas as “Wild Thang”
Soaring Eagle	2018	Soaring Eagle	Zipline	

=== Family rides ===
Ride	Opened	Manufacturer	Model	Description
Rodeo Roundup	1998	Duce	Bumper Cars	Formerly called Dodge 'Ems (1998–2022)
Grand Carousel	1998	Chance Rides	50 ft. Grand Carrousel	A classic carousel
Grand Centennial Ferris Wheel	1993	Chance Rides	90' Giant Wheel	A classic wheel that isn’t to fast or clanky and is perfect for families
Ol' 89er Express	1997	Chance Rides	C.P. Huntington	
Prairie Schooner	1984	Intamin	Bounty	A frontier city original, kids tend to instantly run to this ride.
Casino	2000-2026	Chance Rides	Trabant	Relocated from Elitch Gradens; currently being refurbished for future seasons
Quick Draw	1958	Sally Corporation	The Great Pistolero Roundup	Interactive dark ride; formerly known as “89er Ghost Mine”; remodeled in 2007; remodeled again in 2026, losing the iconic mountain
Sidewinder	1994	Eli Bridge Company	Scrambler	
Tin Lizzy's	1999	Chance Rides	Electric Cars	
Tina's Tea Cup Whirl	1997	Zamperla	Mini Tea Cup	
Tornado	1980	Sellner Manufacturing	Tilt-A-Whirl	
Winged Warrior	2014	Larson International	Flying Scooter	

=== Kids' rides ===
Ride	Opened	Manufacturer	Model	Description
Billy's Frog Hopper	2019	Zamperla		
Bubba's Honey Swings	1999	Zamperla	Mini Swings	Relocated from Funtricity Entertainment Park
Hootie's Tree House	1991			
Rocky's Ranger Planes	2001	Zamperla	Mini Jet	

=== Water Park Rides ===
Ride	Opened	Manufacturer	Model	Description
Gully Washer	2017	ProSlide Technology	TurboTwister custom	Three body slides.
Mystery River Log Flume	1983	Hopkins Rides	Log Flume	
Renegade Rapids	1990	Hopkins Rides	River Raft	
Wild West Water Works	2012	WhiteWater West	AquaPlay RainFortress	Five stories tall and features a 1000-gallon tipping bucket, 8 slides and a large lounging deck.

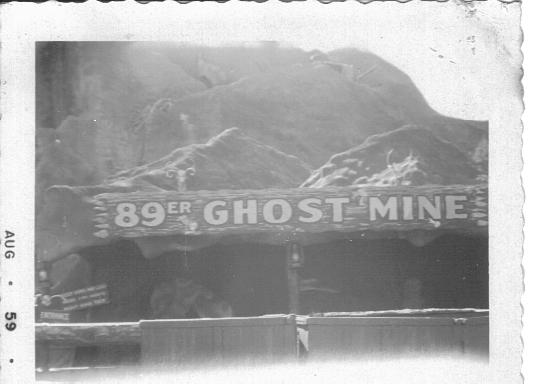
The former 89er Ghost Mine, one of the original attractions at Frontier City (1959 photograph)

== Former rides ==
Rides	Opened	Removed	Manufacturer	Model	Description
Sheldon's Balloon Race	2019	2024	Zamperla	Midi Wheel	
Indian Canoes	1991	2018	Venture Rides	Venture River	Removed for Sheldon’s Balloon Race.
Blue Lightnin'	1985	1992	Unknown	Inner Tube Flume Ride	Part of a group of slides known as "Water Mountain." Removed for Diamondback.
Bucky's Whistlestop Depot	1996	2022	Zamperla	Rio Grande Train	
Bumper Boats	1993	2008		Kiddie bumper boats	Removed for Steel Lasso
Eruption	2003	2012	S&S Power	Sky Sling	Removed due to "[the] manufacturer's inability to produce parts for it".
Geronimo Skycoaster	1995	2021	Skycoaster Inc.		Unique half-arch single-lattice tower. Removed after the 2021 season due to declining popularity.
Hangman	2000	2014	Chance Rides	Slingshot	Removed for Winged Warrior
Mindbender	1999	2015	Chance Rides	Inverter	Removed due to the ride's inability to reopen, which is expensive to repair from the manufacturer. Replaced by a sitting area.
Nightmare Mine Roller Coaster	1979	2000	S.D.C.	Galaxi	Originally outdoors as the "Orange Blossom Special", closed from 2000 to 2010, removed in 2010.
Rodeo Round-Up	1997	2015	HUSS	Enterprise	Removed for Gunslinger
Swingin' Six Guns	1982	2008	Chance Rides	Yo-Yo	Removed for Steel Lasso
Thunder Road Raceway	1999	2019	J&J Amusements	Go-Karts	A go-kart attraction that was up-charge. Removed due to declining popularity.
Tomahawk	1998	2007	Vekoma	Air Jumper	Removed for Steel Lasso. Formally known as “Time Warp” before being renamed.
Tumbleweed	1992	2019	Chance Rides	Rotor	It was originally named Terrible Twister, and the name was changed to Tumbleweed for the 2014 season. Closed at the end of the 2019 season. Removed in 2021.
Wild Kitty	1991	2012	Allen Herschel Company	Little Dipper	Removed for a Little Dipper of the same name in 2013.
Wild Kitty	2013	2018	Allen Herschel Company	Little Dipper	Relocated from Elitch Gardens. Removed for Frankie's Mine Train. Parts of the track still remain as decoration.
