= Six Flags Hurricane Harbor Oklahoma City =

Water park in Oklahoma City

- Interactive map of Six Flags Hurricane Harbor Oklahoma City
- Slogan: Oklahoma's Most Thrilling Water Park
- Location: Oklahoma City, Oklahoma, United States
- Coordinates: 35.461378°N 97.588506°W
- Owner: EPR Properties (2017–present)
- Operated by: Six Flags
- Opened: May 23, 1981
- Previous names: White Water Bay (1991 - 2020); White Water (1981 - 1991)
- Operating season: May to September
- Pools: 3 (Wave Pool, Activity Pool, and Kids Pool) pools
- Water slides: 14 water slides
- Website: Six Flags Hurricane Harbor Oklahoma City

Six Flags Hurricane Harbor Oklahoma City (often shortened to Hurricane Harbor OKC) is a water park in Oklahoma City, Oklahoma built in 1981. Built by the Herschend Family Entertainment Corporation and originally known as White Water, the water park was picked up by Premier Parks (then known as Tierco) in 1991 and its name was changed to White Water Bay. Both White Water Bay and the nearby theme park Frontier City were sold again in a seven park package by Six Flags on January 11, 2007, for $312 million. The park was renamed to Six Flags Hurricane Harbor Oklahoma City in 2020. Hurricane Harbor OKC is currently owned by EPR Properties and operated by Six Flags Entertainment Corporation.

== Rides include ==
- Bermuda Triangle, is a set of three flume-style rides that allow single riders with inner tubes. It is roughly seven stories tall and reaches speeds of 35 miles per hour. The Bermuda Triangle's starting pools are atop the same tower as those of the "Mega Wedgie" and "Dive Bomb". This tower is clearly visible from Interstate 40, with an American flag that could be seen flying on a pole mounted at the top of the tower. 36" Height Requirement
- Big Kahuna, Opened in 1995, this family tube ride takes up to four passengers down a 542-foot (165 m) flume slide and then into a 4-foot (1.2 m) pool for a splash landing. Sits on ground formerly occupied by the defunct "All American Plunge". 36" Height Requirement
- Blackbeard's Revenge is a body slide that follows a clockwise turn and then exits at water-level close to the middle of "Caribbean Cove". 36" Height Requirement
- Bonzai Pipeline is a pair of single-passenger flume slides that requires single tubes only. 36" Height Requirement
- Calypso Cannonball is a short body slide that exits at water level into the north end of "Caribbean Cove". 36" Height Requirement
- Caribbean Cove is an activity pool with wobbly "Lily Pads", a set of high jump rocks known as the "Gangplank", two body slides: "Blackbeard's Revenge" and "Calypso Cannonball", and two tube rides: "Paradise Plunge" and "Raging Rapids".
- Castaway Creek is a 4-foot-deep (1.2 m) canal that travels around the park by a slow-moving current.
- Dive Bomb is a water slide that begins with a short drop, then levels out in a section with water flowing into the slide, and ends with a long drop to the splash area below. 52" Height Requirement (white)
- Gangplank is a rock face eleven-feet above the surface of the water at the north end of "Caribbean Cove". No Height Requirement.
- Hurricane Bay is a large pool with depths ranging from the zero depth entry to roughly eight feet. The waves are on for five minutes and then off for thirteen minutes. Top of every hour the pool is cleared for cleaning.
- Mega Wedgie, Built in 2005, it is a 277-foot-long (84 m) speed slide that features a 64-foot (20 m) free fall. 52" Height Requirement (green)
- Paradise Plunge is a tube flume slide that takes goes through a dark tunnel and then out into the west end of "Caribbean Cove". 36" Height Requirement
- Pipeline Wave is a wave slide with a 42-foot drop built adjacent to "Typhoon Twister". 48" Height Requirement
- Raging Rapids is a shallow water tube ride that floats from one pool to the next via short drops and slides. 36" Height Requirement
- Splashwater Island is a family attraction
- Typhoon Twister is a 67-foot-wide tubing bowl ride built adjacent to "Pipeline Wave". 48" Height Requirement
- Wahoo Racer a 4 lane mat racer slide opened in 2021. 42" Height Requirement

== Rides on opening day ==
Below is a list of the names of the rides on opening day, and what they are currently named.

- Great Sea Wave, now known as Hurricane Bay.
- The Twister and The Sidewinder, now known collectively as Bonzai Pipeline.
- Pirate's Cove, currently known as Caribbean Cove.
- The Rapids, now known as Raging Rapids.
- Little Squirts Island, now known as Splashwater Island.

== Defunct rides ==
- All American Plunge, A speed slide that stood where the Big Kahuna is today. Guests rode special kickboards through a small gate and down this slide facing forwards. Guests could either sit atop the kickboard or lie atop it on their stomachs and ride the All American Plunge head first into the splash pool.
- Cannonball Falls were two slides, each with an 8-foot (2.4 m) drop into a splash pool. One of Cannonball Fall's slides was enclosed and featured a long left turn followed by a short right turn before dropping into the pool. The other slide was not enclosed, and had no turns. Cannonball Falls's splash pool had two exits; one was a stairway onto the walkway at ground level, and the other was an entry into "Castaway Creek". 42" Height Requirement

There was also a miniature golf area present in the Northwest corner of the park.
