= Golden Ticket Award for Best New Ride =

Award honoring best new attraction

- Awarded for: Best new attraction in both Amusement and Water parks
- Country: United States
- Presented by: Amusement Today
- First award: 2005
- Currently held by: Steel Vengeance (amusement park); Medusa's Slidewheel (water park)
- Website: goldenticketawards.com

The Golden Ticket Award for Best New Ride is presented by Amusement Today to the best new attraction in the water park industry. The award was presented for best new attraction in both water parks and amusement parks since its inception in 2005 until 2018.

== History ==
The Golden Ticket Awards have been presenting awards since 1998 acknowledging amusement and water parks for their achievement in different categories. The Best New Ride award was introduced in the form of two different awards to acknowledge the best in amusement and water parks. The award has been presented since 2005 and has been featured on the Discovery Channel and the Travel Channel. In 2019, the amusement park award was split into three categories. The overall award was renamed to Best New Attraction Installation of 2019, with "industry suppliers and parks hav[ing] direct involvement with nominations". The Best New Family Attraction and Best New Roller Coaster categories were also introduced.

== Best New Amusement Park Ride ==
From 2005 to 2018, the fourteen winners were only produced by twelve different theme parks. The parks to introduce the most winners in this timespan were Cedar Point and Dollywood with two rides each. With five awards, Cedar Fair was the company that produced the most best new rides.

Year	Winner(s)	Park	Other candidates
2005	Hades	Mt. Olympus Water & Theme Park	Kingda Ka at Six Flags Great Adventure; Italian Job: Stunt Track at Paramount's Kings Island; maXair at Cedar Point; Powder Keg: A Blast into the Wilderness at Silver Dollar City; SheiKra at Busch Gardens Tampa Bay
2006	The Voyage	Holiday World & Splashin' Safari	Expedition Everest at Disney's Animal Kingdom; El Toro at Six Flags Great Adventure; Goliath at Six Flags Over Georgia; Kentucky Rumbler at Beech Bend Park
2007	Maverick	Cedar Point	Mystery Mine at Dollywood; Griffon at Busch Gardens Europe; Renegade at Valleyfair; Troy at Toverland
2008	Ravine Flyer II	Waldameer & Water World	Boardwalk Bullet at Kemah Boardwalk; Behemoth at Canada's Wonderland; Led Zeppelin - The Ride at Hard Rock Park; Evel Knievel at Six Flags St. Louis
2009	Prowler	Worlds of Fun	Diamondback at Kings Island; Manta at SeaWorld Orlando; Terminator Salvation: The Ride at Six Flags Magic Mountain; Monster Mansion at Six Flags Over Georgia; Pilgrims Plunge at Holiday World & Splashin' Safari
2010	Harry Potter and the Forbidden Journey	Islands of Adventure	Intimidator 305 at Kings Dominion; Sky Rocket at Kennywood; Intimidator at Carowinds; Ghost Ship at Morey's Piers; Joris en de Draak at Efteling
2011	New Texas Giant	Six Flags Over Texas	Cheetah Hunt at Busch Gardens Tampa Bay; Wooden Warrior at Quassy Amusement Park; Twister at Gröna Lund; Zippin Pippin at Bay Beach Amusement Park
2012	Wild Eagle	Dollywood	Radiator Springs Racers at Disney California Adventure; Leviathan at Canada's Wonderland; Verbolten at Busch Gardens Williamsburg; OzIris at Parc Astérix; Skyrush at Hersheypark
2013	Outlaw Run	Silver Dollar City	Iron Rattler at Six Flags Fiesta Texas; GateKeeper at Cedar Point; Gold Striker at California's Great America; Transformers: The Ride at Universal Studios Florida
2014	Flying Turns	Knoebels	Banshee at Kings Island; Goliath at Six Flags Great America; Harry Potter and the Escape from Gringotts at Universal Studios Florida; Lightning Run at Kentucky Kingdom
2015	Fury 325	Carowinds	Wicked Cyclone at Six Flags New England; Twisted Colossus at Six Flags Magic Mountain; Cú Chulainn Coaster at Tayto Park; Thunderbird at Holiday World & Splashin' Safari
2016	Lightning Rod	Dollywood	Storm Chaser at Kentucky Kingdom; Mako at SeaWorld Orlando; Valravn at Cedar Point; Switchback at ZDT's Amusement Park
2017	Mystic Timbers	Kings Island	Flight of Passage at Disney's Animal Kingdom; Mine Blower at Fun Spot America; InvadR at Busch Gardens Williamsburg; Wave Breaker: The Rescue Coaster at SeaWorld San Antonio
2018	Steel Vengeance	Cedar Point	Time Traveler at Silver Dollar City; Twisted Timbers at Kings Dominion; Oscar's Wacky Taxi at Sesame Place; Wicker Man at Alton Towers

== Best New Water Park Ride ==
The award for the Best New Water Park Ride has been presented since 2005 and is given to the ride that has been voted for by industry professionals. The park that has received the award the most is Holiday World & Splashin' Safari in Indiana, with total of five. There is also a Golden Ticket Award that recognizes the Best Water Park and Best Water Park Ride as voted on by the same industry leaders, however this is without the handicap of being anew ride for a specific year.

In 2016, the winner of the Best New Water Park Ride in 2014, Verrückt, was involved in a fatal accident where a 10-year-old boy, named Caleb Schwab, was tragically decapitated along with serious injury to the other two riders. The ride never reopened, was demolished in 2018, and remains as one of the most tragic accidents in the Amusement Park industry. Verrückt remains the only water park ride on this list to have closed.

The Schlitterbahn Water Park chain appears on the list multiple times. The Falls at Schlitterbahn in Texas is the World's Longest Water park ride at 3,600 feet. The ride simulates a whitewater river rafting all ages experience, and includes sudden drops and rough waters.

Medusa's SlideWheel at Mt. Olympus Water & Theme park is the United States' first rotating waterslide, and also the winner of the Golden Ticket for Best New Water Park Ride in 2022. This type of slide has riders enter one end of the slide as the whole structure rotates, causing the riders to have "pendulum movement" as they slide through the intricate tubing.

Year	Winner(s)	Park	Other candidates
2005	Black Anaconda	Noah's Ark Water Park	Crush 'n Gusher at Typhoon Lagoon; Typhoon at Six Flags New England; Bahari Wave Pool at Holiday World & Splashin' Safari; Funnel of Fear at Michigan's Adventure
2006	Bahari River	Holiday World & Splashin' Safari	Time Warp at Noah's Ark Water Park; Tornado at Six Flags Hurricane Harbor Chicago; Fire Tower Falls at Dollywood's Splash Country
2007	Bakuli	Holiday World & Splashin' Safari	Deluge at Six Flags Kentucky Kingdom; Brainwash at Wet 'n Wild Orlando; East Coast Waterworks at Hersheypark; Poseidon's Rage at Mt. Olympus Water & Theme Park
2008	Dragon's Revenge	Schlitterbahn, Texas	Dolphin's Plunge at Aquatica Orlando; Black Hole: The Next Generation at Wet 'n Wild Orlando; Rock & Roll Island at Water Country USA; Taumata Racer at Aquatica Orlando
2009	Congo River Expedition	Schlitterbahn, Texas	Wahoo Racer at Six Flags St. Louis; UpSurge! at Alabama Adventure; Maximum Velocity at Wet'n' Wild Phoenix; Dr. Von Dark's Tunnel of Terror at Splish Splash
2010	Wildebeest	Holiday World & Splashin' Safari	
2011	The Falls	Schlitterbahn, Texas	
2012	Mammoth	Holiday World & Splashin' Safari	
2013	River Rush	Dollywood's Splash Country	
2014	Verrückt	Schlitterbahn Kansas City	Colossal Curl at Water Country USA; Bahama Blasters at Six Flags Fiesta Texas; Deep Water Dive at Kentucky Kingdom; Snake Pit at Dorney Park & Wildwater Kingdom
2015	Dive Bomber	Six Flags White Water Atlanta	SlideZilla at Elitch Gardens Theme Park; Aqua Rocket at Raging Waters San Dimas; Slideboarding at Wet'n'Wild Las Vegas; Anaconda at Kalahari Resorts Pocono Mts.
2016	Massiv	Schlitterbahn, Galveston	Blackbeard’s Revenge at Carowinds; Cyclone Saucers at Beach Bend; Tropical Plunge at Kings Island; Wonambi at Raging Waters, Illinois
2017	Thunder Rapids	Six Flags Fiesta Texas	Krakatau Aqua Coaster at Volcano Bay; Point Plummet at Cedar Point Shores; Miss Adventure Falls at Typhoon Lagoon; Ko'okiri Body Plunge at Volcano Bay
2018	Ray Rush	Aquatica Orlando	Breaker's Edge at Hersheypark; Rock Wheel at Chimelong Waterpark; Whitecap Racer at Hersheypark; Raja at Noah's Ark Water Park
2019	Cutback Water Coaster	Water Country USA	Lava Drifting at Shanghai Haichang Ocean Waterpark; Daredevil's Peak at Little Stirrup Cay; Infinity Racers at Schlitterbahn Galveston; Rapid Remix at Soundwaves Water Park
2021	Cheetah Chase	Holiday World & Splashin' Safari	Riptide Race at Aquatica Orlando; Tsunami Surge at Six Flags Hurricane Harbor Chicago; Venus Vortex at Lake Compounce; Rally Racer at Waldameer Park
2022	Medusa's Slidewheel	Mt. Olympus Water & Theme Park	Rocket Rapids at Quassy Amusement Park; Riptide Racer at Aquatica San Antonio; The Edge at Soaky Mountain; Rapids Racer at Adventure Island
2023	Rocket Blast	Waldameer & Water World	Riptide Race at Water Country USA; Vikingløp at Rulantica; Turtle Coaster at Aqualand/Land of Legends; Lightspeed Shuttle at Studio City Water Park
2024	Rise of Icarus	Mt. Olympus Water & Theme Park	Icon Tower at Meryal Waterpark; Kaleidoscope Kavern at Wilderness at the Smokies; Ridge Runner at Wilderness at the Smokies; Eagle Hunt at Boulder Beach at Silverwood
2025	HydroMAGNETIC LIM Mammoth Water Coaster	Chimelong Water Park	RiverRacers at Soak City at Kings Island; Rafter's Rage at Soaky Mountain; Moosehorn Falls at Splash Works at Canada's Wonderland; The Hive at Zoombezi Bay
2026	Aquaticar	Aquarabia	Power Rapids at Aquatopia; Presque Isle Plunge at Waldameer & Water World; Reef Runners at Seabreeze; Nitro Blast at NRH2O
