= List of people who were decapitated =

The following is a list of people who were decapitated, arranged alphabetically by country or region and with date of decapitation. These individuals lost their heads accidentally. This includes animal-related deaths. A list of people who lost their heads through execution or murder can be found at List of people who were beheaded.

== Argentina ==
- Oscar Lofeudo (1998) – Decapitated in a Argentinean Turismo Carretera Championship pre-race qualifying session in Rafaela circuit; Lofeudo was co-driver along with Raúl Petrich, who also died.
- Daniel Ponce (2001) – Decapitated in a Mendoza Cross Country Championship race, in San Martín, Mendoza.
- Matías Viapiano (2003) – Decapitated in a Tucuman Province Dirt Karting Championship race in Estación Aráoz, Tucumán.

== Australia ==
- Shirley Ann Durdin (1985) – Durdin was decapitated by a great white shark while snorkeling in Port Lincoln, South Australia; she was eaten alive
- Kerry McLoughlin (1987) – Decapitated by a saltwater crocodile at Cahills Crossing, Northern Territory
- Unnamed construction worker (2005) - Decapitated when concrete slabs fell onto him at a work site in Sydney. Three other workers were injured in the accident.

== Canada ==
- Roberta McIvor (2011) - Decapitated in a botched carjacking in Sandy Bay First Nation. The carjackers, aged 15 and 17, were sentenced to two years in jail in August 2012.

== Chile ==
- José Larenas Miranda (1980) – decapitated by a great white shark.

== France ==
- Jean Larivière (1951) – decapitated in racing car crash in the 1951 24 Hours of Le Mans.
- Gerry Birrell (1973) – decapitated when competing in Round 9 of European Formula 2 Championship at Rouen-Les-Essarts.

== Germany ==
- Csaba Kesjár (1988) - decapitated in a practice session for German Formula 3 race at the Norisring.

== Great Britain ==
- Henry Byng, 4th Earl of Strafford (1899) – decapitated by a train at Potters Bar railway station
- Donald Campbell (1967) – decapitated in crash of his hydroplane Bluebird K7 during world water speed record attempt in Coniston Water.
- Simon Brown from East Grinstead was killed while leaning from a train window when travelling on the Gatwick Express on Sunday 7 August 2016.

== Netherlands/Belgium ==
- Chris Bristow (1960) – decapitated in crash during the 1960 Belgian Grand Prix.
- Alain Vincx (1987) – decapitated in car racing stunt challenge at Circuit Zandvoort.

== New Zealand ==
- Dr. Alistair Kenneth Sr. (2011) - Decapitated by the blade of a homemade hovercraft he was demonstrating to his family when a structural failure caused the blade to shear off.

== Palestine ==
- Ismail al-Ghoul (2024) – decapitated by an Israeli airstrike.

== Papua New Guinea ==
- Melas Mero (2014) – decapitated by a saltwater crocodile

== Philippines ==
- Unnamed girl (2009) – decapitated by a saltwater crocodile

== Portugal ==
- Paulo Jorge Caracitas (2000) – decapitated while kart racing, when the scarf he was using got stuck in the drive shaft.

== Romania ==
- Nicolae Labiș (1956) – fell off of a tram while going to a friend's house and was decapitated when his head hit the pavement between the two trams in University Square, Bucharest.

== United States ==
- Denny Keith (1964) – decapitated in racing car crash
- Charles Bassett (1966) – decapitated in a crash of a T-38 jet aircraft
- Les Ritchey (1966) – decapitated in a drag racing crash
- Ken Kotalac (1969) – decapitated in a drag bike racing crash
- Boris Sagal (1981) – partially decapitated by the tail rotor blades of a helicopter
- Vic Morrow and Myca Dinh Le (1982) – decapitated by a crashing helicopter during film shoot for Twilight Zone: The Movie
- Three occupants of the Piper PA-28-181 Archer involved in the Cerritos mid-air collision (1986)
- Doug Vermeer (1987) – decapitated in a car racing crash
- Dave Prater (1988) – decapitated in a high-speed car crash
- Jim Brouk (1990) – decapitated in a car racing crash
- Rodin Joseph (1990) - Decapitated by a flying washing machine part at a commercial laundry.
- Randy Hill (1993) – decapitated in a stunt car challenge; in a botched attempt at a mid-air collision, Hill's car was too low, its roof was sheared off, and Hill's head was crushed
- Randy Fry (2004) – decapitated by a great white shark
- Katie Flynn (2005) – decapitated in a car crash
- Jesse Burley (2011) - decapitated when a firework he lit exploded in front of him while setting it out in the street when celebrating the Fourth of July with family.
- Martin Lara (2012) - decapitated when a rope used to tie cleared brush he was feeding into a wood chipper got caught around his neck
- Caleb Schwab (2016) – the 10-year-old son of Kansas state representative Scott Schwab, decapitated while sliding down the world's tallest water slide (Verrückt) at Schlitterbahn Kansas City in Kansas City, Kansas
- Fabian Zepeda (2017) - Decapitated when his motorcycle drove in the path of a downed tension wire. The wire had been downed when another vehicle crashed into a nearby utility pole.
- Salvatore Disi (2019) - decapitated when he was struck by the main rotor blades while trying to jumpstart a helicopter at the Brooksville-Tampa Bay Regional Airport
- Esther Nakajjigo (2020) - decapitated by a gate swung open by a gust of wind while leaving Arches National Park
- Maria Rubalcava de Ruesga (2025) - decapitated when she was struck by a garbage truck while crossing the road
- Magdalena Jablonska (2026) - decapitated in a boating accident
