= NRH2O =

Water park in North Richland Hills, Texas

NRH2O Family Water Park
- Interactive map of NRH2O Family Water Park
- Location: 9001 Boulevard 26 North Richland Hills, Texas, United States
- Coordinates: 32.850577°N 97.193749°W
- Opened: 1995
- Owner: City of North Richland Hills
- General manager: Frank Perez
- Slogan: The Formula for Family Fun!
- Operating season: May through September
- Area: 17 acres (6.9 ha)
- Website: https://www.nrh2o.com/

NRH2O Family Water Park, stylized as NRH_{2}O, is a water park located in North Richland Hills, Texas, owned by the City of North Richland Hills.

The park opened in 1995 and contains water slides, a swimming pool, a wave pool, and a lazy river.

== History ==
In 1995, NRH2O opened as the first city-owned water park in Texas. At the time, the park had three water slides, a river, and a swimming pool. The park added "dive in" movies that guests could watch while at the park.

In 2004, a 12 year-old girl died after collapsing at the water park. The city was sued by the girl's family in case that went up to the Supreme Court of Texas.

In 2014, a 7 year-old boy died after collapsing at the water park.

In 2016, Fox News named NRH2O one of the best water parks in the U.S.

In 2019, The Dallas Morning News and Fort Worth Star-Telegram named NRH2O one of the best water parks in Dallas-Fort Worth.

The water park contains the world’s largest uphill water coaster, which is the Green Extreme at 1,161 long and 81 feet tall, this record was never beaten by any other park in the word. Built for the 1998 season this awesome Texas water coaster served over 25 seasons of thrill seekers and is loved by many. Green Extreme was revolutionary operating in blocks sections similar to a roller coaster increasing capacity, during peak times you could find multiple boats occupying the slide however in the last few years of operation it only worked in manual mode. The water on Green Extreme propels riders at an average 19 ft./s Green Extreme is even bigger and longer than Schlitterbahn's master blaster making it truly one of a kind.[9]

The park receives more than 250,000 guests annually.

== Facilities ==
=== Rides/Attractions ===
==== Body Slides ====
- Sidewinder
  - AquaLoop manufactured by WhiteWater West
- Riggamaroll
- Thunder
- Blue Sky

==== Tube Slides ====
- Viper a Python Waterslide by WhiteWater West
  - Manufactured by WhiteWater West
- Green Extreme a Master Blaster water coaster developed by New Braunfels General Store (later known as NBGS International) Green extreme is the longest uphill master blaster water coaster in the world at over 1,161 long and 81 feet tall. Green extreme is even bigger and longer than Schlitterbahn's master blaster making it truly one of a kind. Sadly Green Extreme is set to be closed after the 2023 season possibly due to refurbishment cost, built for the 1998 season this awesome Texas water coaster served over 25 seasons of thrill seekers and is loved by many. Green Extreme was revolutionary operating in blocks sections similar to a roller coaster increasing capacity, during peak times you could find multiple boats occupying the slide however in the last few years of operation it only worked in manual mode. The water on Green Extreme propels riders at an average 19 ft./s Green extremes tower was also used for weather alerts and lightning detection for the park, guards would use an air horn alerting upon detection. Note: The line for the Green Extreme may close up to 45 minutes prior to the park's posted closing time. Rules: Riders must be 42 inches tall and less than 250 lbs. Guests over 250 lbs. can ride with another guest if combined weight is 500 lbs. or less. Specific ride information is available at the ride and at Guest Services
  - Master Blaster manufactured by WhiteWater West
- Accelerator
  - Manufactured by WhiteWater West
- Purplepalooza
- Double Dipper

==== Pools and Play Areas ====
- Beachside Bay
- Frogstein’s Splashatory
  - manufactured by WhiteWater West
- NRH2Ocean (Wave Pool)
- Endless River
- Tadpole Swimming Hole (originally Tadpole Train Station)
- Sand Volleyball Court
- Stream
  - Entering the park you are greeted by a circular area with four water jets pointing to a centerpoint this mostly created the water for what start the Stream, the water would slowly flow to the middle of the park. (originally a revolutionary way the park allowed gest to walk through a stream of water that started at the entrance of the park and placed between the lazy river and wave pool areas stream allowed guests to cool their feet off instead of walking on the hot Texas concrete.) The park entrance part of Stream usually had a walking lifeguard. Park entrance part of stream consisting of four jets was ripped out in year 2022, the middle section and ending part of Stream still remains.

=== Revenue ===
==== Food and Beverage ====
- Al Gator’s Smokehouse & Grill
- Piper’s River Falls Café
- Sheldon’s Ice Cream Shop
- Eb & Flo’s Funnel Cake Lab
- Dippin' Dots Shack

==== Retail ====
- Waterford's Gift Shop (Before the new locker system, locker keys could be purchased in the gift shop rentals lasted the park day.)
