= King Cobra (ride) =

Defunct water slide

Six Flags Hurricane Harbor New Jersey
- Status: Removed
- Opening date: July 24, 2012
- Closing date: September 2017

General statistics
- Model: King Cobra
- Height: 56 ft (17 m)
- Drop: 25 ft (7.6 m)
- Length: 256 ft (78 m)
- Speed: 32 mph (51 km/h)
- Max vertical angle: 50°
- Capacity: 480 riders per hour
- Height restriction: 48 in (122 cm)
- Manufacturer: Polin
- Flash Pass Available

King Cobra was a water slide at Six Flags Hurricane Harbor New Jersey and Aquapolis Athens at Greece, adjacent to Six Flags Great Adventure, in Jackson, New Jersey. The ride is manufactured by Turkish manufacturer, Polin. The ride did not open for the 2018 season, and was dismantled at the end of the season, paving way for Calypso Springs.

== History ==

American Coaster Enthusiasts announced on February 10, 2012, that Six Flags Great Adventure's Hurricane Harbor had a big announcement for the 2012 season on February 13. On the morning of February 13, 2012, Six Flags Hurricane Harbor: New Jersey announced King Cobra for the 2012 season. King Cobra is marketed as the first ride of its kind in the United States, when the water ride opened on July 24, 2012. King Cobra was built instead of the drop boxes originally proposed to be added to the park's existing water slides at The Falls. It closed in 2017, and was removed in 2018.

== Ride ==
King Cobra features two dueling slides. The ride begins with a figure eight before dropping down a 25-foot (7.6 m) drop at speeds of up to 32 miles per hour (51 km/h). The drop is the entry point into a Sidewinder element that looks like a cobra head. Within this element riders oscillate back and forth before coming to a stop in the middle. King Cobra has an orange bold, black and red scales to resemble a massive cobra on both the interior and exterior of the slide. The slide was built in the middle of Hurricane Harbor and took place of the existing, sandy volleyball pit.

== Incidents ==
In August 2015 a woman was injured while riding because she had exceeded the 200 pound weight limit for single riders thus slamming into the mouth of the snake. The victim then sued Six Flags Hurricane Harbor for $3 million as a victim of corporate negligence in 2016. Due to the lawsuit, the Hurricane Harbor management has decided to remove King Cobra in order to make room for a new attraction in the future.

== See also ==
- 2012 in amusement parks
