= Six Flags Hurricane Harbor =

North American water park brand

- Product type: Water parks
- Current owner: Six Flags
- Country: United States (15 parks); Mexico (1 park)
- Introduced: 1995
- Related brands: Schlitterbahn; Soak City
- Markets: Arizona; California; Georgia; Illinois; Missouri; Morelos; New Jersey; New York; Oklahoma; Texas
- Website: See external links

Six Flags Hurricane Harbor, simply known as Hurricane Harbor, is a brand of Caribbean-themed water parks owned by Six Flags. The water parks commonly include water slides, wave pools, lazy rivers, restaurants, and shops, but are not identical. There are 16 Hurricane Harbor water parks located in North America, 14 of which are operated by Six Flags. Some of these water parks were built from the ground up while others were acquired and rebranded. Two Hurricane Harbor water parks are operated by Enchanted Parks after they were sold in 2026.

The brand is associated with the former Six Flags company prior to its 2024 merger. It was launched in 1995 with the opening of a Hurricane Harbor water park adjacent to Six Flags Magic Mountain, now known as Hurricane Harbor Los Angeles.

Only two Hurricane Harbor water parks have been closed: one at the former Six Flags Worlds of Adventure, and Hurricane Harbor Maryland at the former Six Flags America.

== History ==
In September 1994, Six Flags announced plans to build a new water park in Valencia, California, adjacent to the Six Flags Magic Mountain amusement park. The water park was named Six Flags Hurricane Harbor and opened in 1995. Six Flags additionally filed a trademark for the Hurricane Harbor name with the United States Patent and Trademark Office on November 4, 1994. Six Flags would later acquire the Wet 'n Wild water park in Arlington, Texas, in April 1995, which operated with the byline "A Six Flags Park." It was speculated in November 1996 that park executives were debating whether to rename the Wet 'n Wild as simply Hurricane Harbor with the "A Six Flags Park" byline or Six Flags Hurricane Harbor. The Arlington park was ultimately rebranded as the latter in 1997.

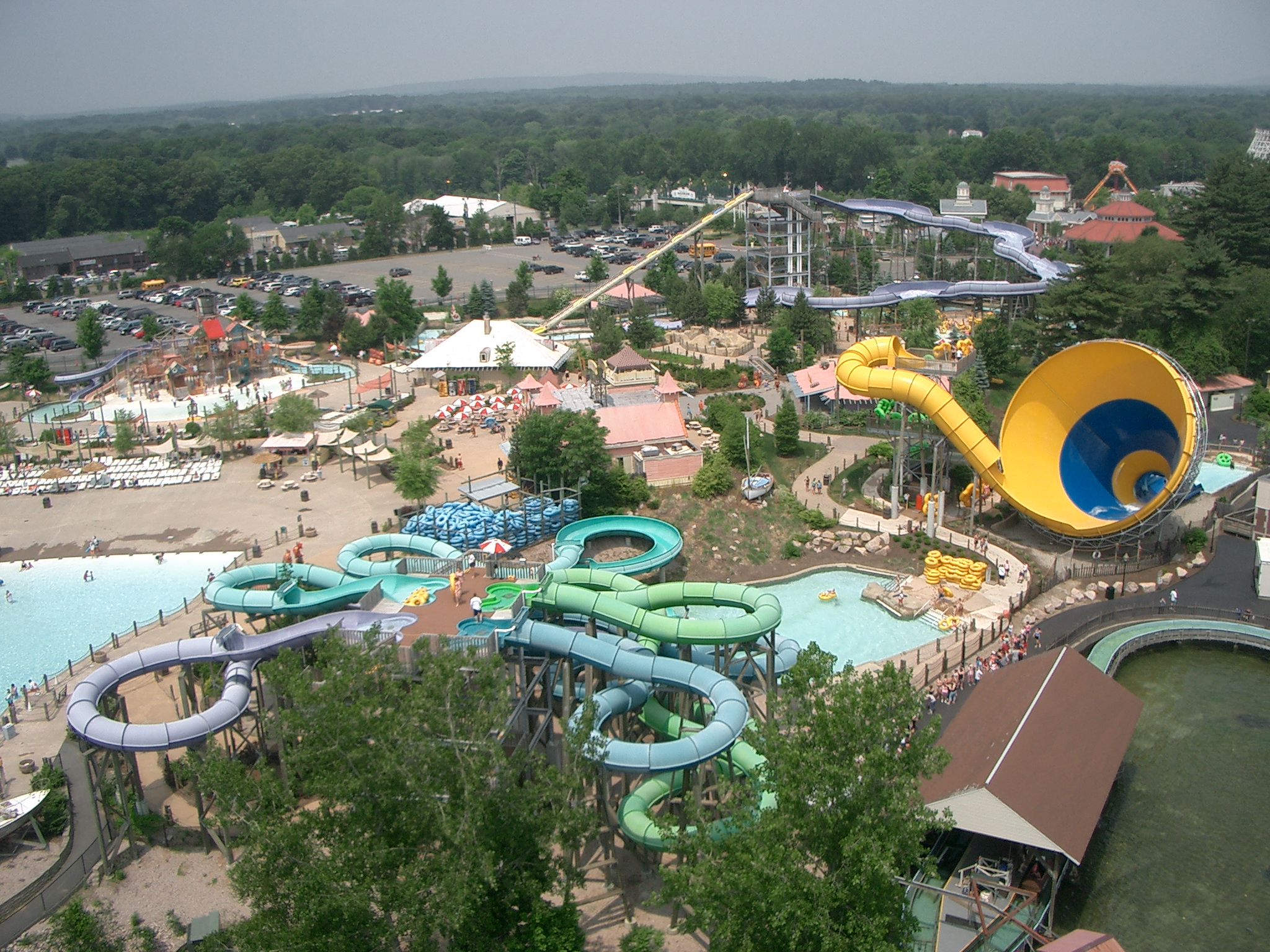
Six Flags New England's Hurricane Harbor opened in 2003 as part of Six Flags' growing efforts to grow the brand in the 2000s.

Throughout the late-1990s through the 2000s, Six Flags would start to expand the Hurricane Harbor brand through the construction of new water parks or rebranding existing water parks attached to their theme parks. In 1999, Six Flags St. Louis constructed its own intra-park water attractions section. Two Hurricane Harbor water parks would open in 2000: Six Flags Great Adventure in Jackson Township, New Jersey opened the Hurricane Harbor New Jersey water park in May 2000 after three years of planning; the recently-acquired Six Flags Worlds of Adventure in Aurora, Ohio also opened one as part of a large theme park expansion. In 2003, Six Flags New England in Agawam, Massachusetts, renamed and expanded their Island Kingdom water park to Six Flags Hurricane Harbor.

The Aurora, Ohio, Hurricane Harbor was sold to Cedar Fair in 2004, as part of the sale of Six Flags Worlds of Adventure. It was renamed Hurricane Hannah's Waterpark before it was ultimately abandoned in 2006. Most of its attractions were relocated to a new water park on the other side of the property named Wildwater Kingdom. Another two Hurricane Harbor-branded water parks would open in 2005. Six Flags America in Woodmore, Maryland, rebranded their existing Paradise Island water park into a Hurricane Harbor. After a failed attempt to build a water park in the late-1990s, Six Flags Great America in Gurnee, Illinois, opened their Hurricane Harbor next to the theme park.

Six Flags would not build another Hurricane Harbor water park until 2014, when Six Flags Over Georgia in Mableton, Georgia added a water park. In 2015, Six Flags acquired an abandoned water park in Oaxtepec, Morelos. It was renamed Hurricane Harbor Oaxtepec, renovated, and reopened in 2017 under its new name.

In the late 2010s, Six Flags would acquire lease rights to operate multiple water parks owned by EPR Properties, most of which Six Flags had previously owned. These properties included Waterworld Concord (renamed Hurricane Harbor Concord in 2018), Wet 'n Wild Splashtown (renamed Hurricane Harbor Splashtown in 2019), White Water Bay (renamed Hurricane Harbor Oklahoma City), and Wet 'n Wild Phoenix (renamed Hurricane Harbor Phoenix in 2020). Additionally, Six Flags acquired lease rights from the Rockford Park District to Magic Waters in Cherry Valley, Illinois, for 10 years in 2018. It was renamed to Hurricane Harbor Rockford in 2020.

It was announced in 2021 that Great America's Hurricane Harbor park would operate as a separate property, becoming Hurricane Harbor Chicago. In 2023, White Water Bay, next to Six Flags Fiesta Texas, was renamed to Hurricane Harbor San Antonio. Hurricane Harbor Maryland at Six Flags America was permanently closed on September 6, 2025, ahead of its adjacent theme park's official closure on November 2, 2025.

== Locations ==
Map of Six Flags Hurricane Harbor water parks as of April 2026.
Operated by Six Flags
Operated by Enchanted Parks

As of 2026, there are 16 Six Flags Hurricane Harbor-branded water parks throughout North America.

The Six Flags Hurricane Harbor water parks within Great Escape (formerly Six Flags Great Escape) and Six Flags St. Louis are the only parks not operated by Six Flags following its sale in April 2026. The current owner, EPR Properties, will continue to use the Six Flags Hurricane Harbor brand for the remainder of the 2026 season under a licensing agreement.

=== Located within amusement parks ===
The following Hurricane Harbor water parks are typically included with admission with their connected theme parks.

Name	Location	Year opened	Connected park	Notes
Hurricane Harbor Atlanta	Mableton, Georgia	2014	Six Flags Over Georgia	—N/a
Hurricane Harbor Darien Lake	Darien, New York	1990	Six Flags Darien Lake	Property owned by EPR Properties. Originally named Barracuda Bay and Splashtown at Darien Lake; rebranded in 2020.
Hurricane Harbor New England	Agawam, Massachusetts	1997	Six Flags New England	Originally named Island Kingdom; rebranded in 2003.
Hurricane Harbor San Antonio	San Antonio, Texas	1992	Six Flags Fiesta Texas	Originally named Ol' Waterin' Hole, Armadillo Beach, and White Water Bay; rebranded in 2023.

=== Separate property or admission ===
The following Hurricane Harbor water parks either operate as a separate property or are not included with the nearby theme park admission.

Name	Location	Year opened or acquired	Notes
Hurricane Harbor Arlington	Arlington, Texas	1995	Originally named Wet 'n Wild, A Six Flags Park. Located near Six Flags Over Texas.
Hurricane Harbor Chicago	Gurnee, Illinois	2005	Located next to Six Flags Great America.
Hurricane Harbor Concord	Concord, California	2017	Property owned by EPR Properties. Originally named Waterworld California; rebranded in 2018.
Hurricane Harbor Los Angeles	Valencia, California	1995	Located next to Six Flags Magic Mountain.
Hurricane Harbor New Jersey	Jackson Township, New Jersey	2000	Located within the Six Flags Great Adventure Resort.
Hurricane Harbor Oaxtepec	Oaxtepec, Morelos	2015	Originally opened in the 1940s; rebranded in 2017.
Hurricane Harbor Oklahoma City	Oklahoma City, Oklahoma	2018	Property owned by EPR Properties. Originally named White Water Bay; rebranded in 2020.
Hurricane Harbor Phoenix	Phoenix, Arizona	2019	Property owned by EPR Properties. Originally named Wet 'n Wild Phoenix; rebranded in 2020.
Hurricane Harbor Rockford	Cherry Valley, Illinois	2018	Property owned by the Rockford Park District. Originally named Magic Waters; rebranded in 2020.
Hurricane Harbor Splashtown	Spring, Texas	2019	Property owned by EPR Properties. Originally named Wet 'n' Wild Splashtown; rebranded in 2019.

=== Enchanted Parks-operated ===
The following parks, operated by Enchanted Parks, use the Six Flags Hurricane Harbor brand under a licensing agreement for the 2026 season.

Name	Location	Year opened	Connected park	Notes
Hurricane Harbor	Queensbury, New York	1997	Great Escape	Owned by EPR Properties, operated by Enchanted Parks. Originally named Splashwater Kingdom; rebranded in 2019.
Hurricane Harbor St. Louis	Eureka, Missouri	1999	Mid America Adventure	Owned by EPR Properties, operated by Enchanted Parks.

== See also ==
- List of Six Flags water parks
- Schlitterbahn – Brand of water parks in Texas owned by Six Flags
- Six Flags White Water – Six Flags-owned water park in East Cobb, Georgia
