= Master Blaster (Schlitterbahn) =

Master Blaster is a type of uphill water coaster at Schlitterbahn New Braunfels Waterpark in Texas, USA. Master Blaster opened in 1996 in the Schlitterbahn East section of the park as the anchor attraction to a second themed area called Blastenhoff. The ride is 65 feet tall and 1,100 feet long.

== History ==
In the late 1980s, Jeff Henry, a member of the Henry family that, at the time, owned and operated Schlitterbahn, convinced the family to help provide R&D for a surfing-type ride that was being developed by Thomas Lochtefeld. He was working on an attraction that was capable of spraying a stream of water over molded plastic sheets and asked the Henrys for assistance with developing a soft foam coating. In 1991 Schlitterbahn installed the first Wave Loch FlowRider, an attraction that simulates a continuous wave on which a rider can "surf." The FlowRider, dubbed Boogie Bahn, opened as the centerpiece of Surfenburg, a newly developed section of the park east of the original Schlitterbahn.

Following the FlowRider, Lochtefeld presented Henry with the idea of using water jets to propel a raft uphill on a waterslide. The device was called Master Blaster — an uphill water coaster. Schlitterbahn installed the first Master Blaster, called Dragon Blaster, in the Surfenburg section of the park. It opened in May 1994, and Public Relations Director Sherrie Brammall invited members of American Coaster Enthusiasts to the park to try the new technology and provide feedback. The enthusiasts were excited about the new technology but suggested the ride needed more hills — like a roller coaster.

Two years later, Schlitterbahn opened an even larger Master Blaster, simply called Master Blaster in a newly developed area called Blastenhoff, across the parking lot to the southeast of Surfenberg.

== The Ride ==
Riders begin by climbing 66.2 feet to the top of the Blastenhoff tower. Two-passenger rafts are brought to the top of the tower on a conveyor belt. After passengers board and once the blocking systems indicates the channel ahead is clear, a small conveyor rolls the raft forward into the first drop — the ride's largest. At the bottom of the drop, water jets propel the raft uphill into a small dip and then another short uphill section. The raft then enters an enclosed tube section and travels 190 degrees back the other direction. This section features two drops and two uphill blasts followed by a right turn in an enclosed tube. Upon exiting the tube the raft drops downhill, turns right again then drops downhill a second time. Another uphill blast leads to a downhill section then the final uphill blast sends the rafts into an enclosed tube with a right turn helix followed by a left turn then a final small drop into the splash pool.

== Awards ==
In 1993 Master Blaster technology swept the International Association of Amusement Parks and Attractions (IAAPA) best new products awards at the annual trade show, winning "Best New Major Ride," "Best New Technology" and "Best Water Ride." It was the first, and thus far, only new attraction to garner all three best new products awards.

The Master Blaster uphill water coaster has been the Amusement Today Golden Ticket winner for Best Water Attraction from 1998 to 2002 and from 2004 to 2009. It was the runner up in 2003 and from 2010 to 2012.

On November 11, 2012, Jeff Henry was named Inventor of the Year at the annual Austin Intellectual Property Law Association’s Judges’ Dinner for his ingenious waterpark designs and attractions such as the Master Blaster.

== See also ==
Water coaster
