= Six Flags Hurricane Harbor New Jersey =

Water park in Jackson Township, New Jersey

- Interactive map of Six Flags Hurricane Harbor New Jersey
- Location: Six Flags Great Adventure Resort, Jackson Township, New Jersey, U.S.
- Coordinates: 40°08′47″N 74°26′19″W
- Owner: Six Flags
- Opened: May 27, 2000; 25 years ago
- Operating season: May to October
- Status: Operating
- Visitors per annum: ▲464,000 in 2024
- Pools: 3 pools
- Water slides: 22 water slides
- Website: sixflags.com/greatadventure/hurricane-harbor-nj

Six Flags Hurricane Harbor New Jersey is a 22-acre (8.9 ha) water park located in Jackson Township, New Jersey, U.S. Located within the Six Flags Great Adventure Resort, it operates as a separately-gated water park under the Six Flags Hurricane Harbor brand. The water park opened on May 27, 2000, and is owned by the Six Flags Entertainment Corporation.

== History ==
On January 20, 2000, Premier Parks (renamed to Six Flags) announced it would build a new, separately-gated water park within the 2,200-acre (890 ha) Six Flags Great Adventure complex. Named Six Flags Hurricane Harbor, it would cost US$40,000,000 (equivalent to $65,939,683 in 2025) to build. It was estimated that the park would create an additional 250 to 300 new jobs and would boost New Jersey's economy. The water park officially opened on May 27, 2000.

On February 13, 2012, the park announced that it would build a snake-themed ride named King Cobra. Marketed as the first of its kind, it opened on July 24, 2012.

In August 2015, a woman filed a lawsuit against the park after breaking her ankle on King Cobra when her tube slammed into the top of the slide, and was not notified that her party exceeded the weight limit prior to riding the attraction. The ride was later removed in 2017.

Hurricane Harbor New Jersey announced in January 2019, that it would build its largest water park expansion since the park's opening named Calypso Springs. Featuring a 100,000-gallon activity pool and a dining location, it opened in July 2019.

In March 2023, the park announced it would build a new children's water playground named Splash Island, adding seven new slides. The attraction opened in May 2023.

== Attractions ==
Attractions and thrill levels per the 2025 edition of the Six Flags Hurricane Harbor New Jersey Guest Accessibility Guide.

Thrill level (out of 5)
1 (low) 2 (mild) 3 (moderate) 4 (high) 5 (aggressive)

Name	Type	Thrill level
Badabing, Bada Bang, Bada Boom!	Tube water slides	5
Big Bambu and Reef Runner	Two family rafting slides	5
Big Wave Racer	Multi-lane racer	5
Blue Lagoon	Wave pool	4
Calypso Springs	Family activity pool	2
Cowabunga, Jellyfish Twist, Splashin' Seal, Stingray Racer	Children water slides	2
Discovery Bay	Interactive play structure, including a pool	2
Hurricane Mountain	Water slide complex	5
Rip Curl & Shark Attack	Tube slide complex	2
Mini Waves Pool	Small wave pool	2
Splash Island	Slide complex and play structure	2
Taak It Eez Ee Creek	Lazy river	2
The Falls — Cannonball, Jurahnimo and Wahini	Body slide complex	5
The Winds — Boreas, Eurus, Zephyrus, and Nortus	Tube slide complex	5
Tornado	Twin bowl slides	5

== Attendance ==
The Themed Entertainment Association estimates attendance figures for Six Flags Hurricane Harbor New Jersey.

Year	Attendance (in thousands)	North America Rank	Ref.
2009	360	18th	
2010	450	15th	
2011	400	16th	
2012	424	16th	
2013	432	13th	
2014	423	14th	
2015	440	15th	
2016	449	14th	
2017	475	14th	
2018	475	13th	
2019	482	13th	
2020	85	13th	
2021	448	13th	
2022	426	13th	
2023	450	11th	
2024	464	12th	

== Awards ==
The park's King Cobra attraction placed third in Amusement Today's 2012 Golden Ticket Awards in the category "Best New Ride (Waterpark)." Hurricane Harbor New Jersey placed fourth in 2022 and ninth in 2023 in USA Today's Readers' Choice Awards for "Best Outdoor Waterpark".
