= Six Flags Hurricane Harbor Rockford =

Water park in Cherry Valley, Illinois

- Logo used since 2025
- Interactive map of Six Flags Hurricane Harbor Rockford
- Slogan: "Ultimate Water Park Destination"
- Location: Cherry Valley, Illinois, U.S.
- Coordinates: 42.246656°N 88.96271°W
- Owner: Rockford Park District (1988-present)
- Operated by: Six Flags (2019-present)
- General manager: Edward Katich
- Opened: 1984; 42 years ago
- Previous names: Magic Waters (1984–2019)
- Operating season: May through September
- Area: 12 acres (4.9 ha)
- Pools: 3 pools
- Water slides: 12 water slides
- Website: www.sixflags.com/hurricaneharborrockford

Six Flags Hurricane Harbor Rockford, formerly known as Magic Waters, is a 12-acre (4.9 ha) water park in Cherry Valley, Illinois, United States, within the Rockford metropolitan area. Since 2019, Six Flags operates the water park under a 10-year lease agreement with the Rockford Park District, which owns the property.

Hurricane Harbor Rockford features 12 water slides and three pools, including Tsunami Bay, which is marketed as the largest wave pool in Illinois. It is one of three Six Flags parks in Illinois, the other two being Six Flags Great America and Hurricane Harbor Chicago in Gurnee, Illinois, approximately 60 miles (97 km) away from Hurricane Harbor Rockford.

== History ==
Magic Waters, a $6 million water theme park in Cherry Valley, was scheduled to open on June 23, 1984. After Magic Waters filed for Chapter 11 bankruptcy on November 1, 1986, a federal bankruptcy court approved a reorganization plan in January 1987. Under the plan, AmCore Bank agreed to lend the park funds to reopen for the 1987 season, to be repaid from that summer's revenues.

In 1993, Splash Magic River, a lazy river ride was added to the park. In 1997 Splash Magic Island, now Tiki Island, was added to the park. The attraction was geared towards families.

In 2000, a water coaster named Splash Blaster was added. The 80 foot tall ride cost $3 million to build. It would be removed in 2015 due to 12 lawsuits against the park from back injuries.

In 2004, The Abyss, a dark tunnel tube slide 5 stories high was added to the park. The ride twists and turns multiple times before it splashes the rider into a pool of daylight.

On May 23, 2009 a new water slide was announced called Typhoon Terror. The ride is a tube slide that is 65 foot tall and can fit 2-4 people in the tube.

On May 30, 2012, Double Dare Drop, a speed slide ride was added. The name was picked after a contest in October 2011. The ride is 75 feet tall and was built by Rockford Structures Construction Co.

In July 2014, a dozen lawsuits were filed against Magic Waters and the Rockford Park District due to the now removed ride Splash Blaster over back injuries. The Rockford Park District has settled the suits, totaling $2.53 million. This led the park to remove the ride on September 3, 2015.

On February 15, 2017, Magic Waters announced that their AquaLoop water slide would be called Screaming Lizard. It would open the following summer. The ride features a 45 degree inclined loop.

On October 9, 2018, Six Flags announced that they had reached an agreement with Rockford Park District to operate Magic Waters Waterpark starting in the spring of 2019 for 10 years. Six Flags will have to pay $425,000 to the Rockford Park District annually. On August 29, 2019, Six Flags renamed Magic Waters to Six Flags Hurricane Harbor Rockford, and will enforce the Hurricane Harbor name for the 2020 season. It was also announced that Tidal Wave would be added to the park as the first "tailspin" slide in the Midwest by WhiteWater West.

Due to the COVID-19 pandemic, Six Flags suspended all parks on March 13, 2020. Six Flags Hurricane Harbor Rockford was expected to open mid-May, but was delayed. It was announced on July 9, 2020, along with Hurricane Harbor Chicago, that the park would reopen on July 20, 2020. Tidal Wave was delayed to 2021.

In 2021, Tidal Wave soft opened to the media on May 28 and officially opened on May 29. The ride is the parks' first waterpark addition under Six Flags' operation.

== Slides and attractions ==
Thrill level (out of 5)
1 (low) 2 (mild) 3 (moderate) 4 (high) 5 (aggressive)

Name	Description	Opened	Thrill level
The Abyss	A dark tunnel tube slide	2004	4
Riptide Rush	A 75-foot speed slide	2012	4
Tsunami Bay	707,000-gallon wave pool, billed as Illinois' largest wave pool	1984	4
Typhoon Terror	A tube slide	2009	4
Paradise Pipelines	Four story inner tube slide	1989	3
Castaway Creek	Lazy river, formerly named Splash Magic River	1993	2
Bermuda Triangle	Five story body slide	1984	4
Wipeout	Trap-door slide, formerly named Screaming Lizard	2017	4
Caribbean Cove	Children interactive playground	1997	2
Little Lagoon	Water playground for children		2
Tidal Wave	A WhiteWater West tailspin water slide, the only in the Midwest	2021	4

== See also ==
- Incidents at Six Flags parks
- Six Flags Hurricane Harbor, a brand of Six Flags water parks
- Six Flags Hurricane Harbor Chicago, a Six Flags Hurricane Harbor water park in Gurnee, Illinois
