= Space Shuttle America =

Defunct motion simulator ride

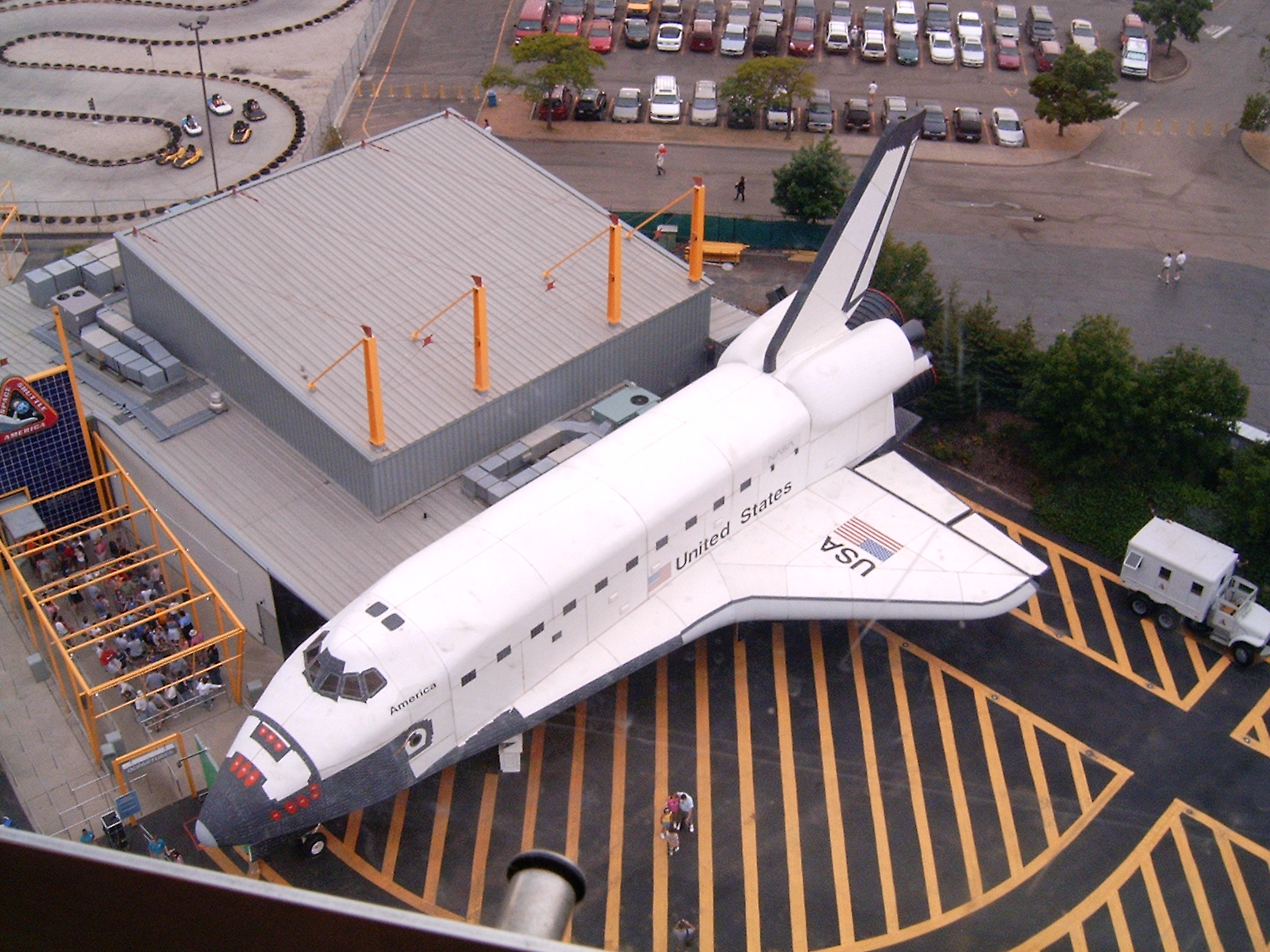
- Space Shuttle America ride viewed from Sky Trek Tower

Six Flags Great America
- Coordinates: 42°22′10.08″N 87°56′12.13″W
- Status: Removed
- Opening date: 1994
- Closing date: 2007
- Replaced by: Riptide Bay

Ride statistics
- Attraction type: Motion simulator
- Manufacturer: Intamin
- Designer: Show Design: Tim Prokop; Art: Ray Allen; Architects: Solberg & Lowe; Scripts & Walkthrough: Tim Prokop; Visual Effects: Buena Vista Visual Effects
- Theme: Space Shuttle

Space Shuttle America (also known as Space Shuttle America – The Next Century) was a motion simulator ride at the Six Flags Great America theme park in Gurnee, Illinois, that opened in 1994. The ride's main feature was a full-scale replica of an American Space Shuttle orbiter. It closed permanently after the 2007 season and was removed on December 5, 2009.

== Storyline ==
The storyline of the ride was that riders have boarded a new Space Shuttle called America, which is capable of transporting passengers to the fictional Armstrong City using the LRVM (Lunar Run Velocity Management) Warp. Armstrong City is located a short distance from Tranquility Base, the site of the first crewed Moon landing.

Guests entered a building that has a small replica of Launch Control at Cape Canaveral. Several TV screens display fake NASA TV recordings about the shuttle and security cam views of the fictional facility that attendees are supposedly touring. Shortly before boarding, there is a notice about a large meteor that is approaching Earth.

In the movie, the shuttle takes off horizontally and the Pas-Com (Passenger Compartment) rises out of the cargo bay so riders can do some orbital sightseeing. The shuttle passes Space Shuttle Destiny, which is doing some cleanup work around the atmosphere. Next the shuttle passes an HBO satellite and Space Station Freedom. The shuttle enters LRVM warp and exits a short distance from the Moon. The shuttle then flies over the Sea of Tranquility and Armstrong City. Shortly before landing at Armstrong, an alert is sent to the shuttle crew ordering them to investigate a meteor danger in the area. The shuttle, not even getting a chance to land, takes off again towards an asteroid belt. America is then hit by an asteroid and is now fighting to survive in the asteroid field. America begins blasting asteroids with its 'particle beam' (laser). The shuttle then spots the meteor and is alerted it is heading on a direct course to Earth. Unable to destroy it from a distance, the shuttle flies through a canyon and a cave and destroys it from the inside. The shuttle, now crippled, heads immediately back towards the LRVM and warps back to Earth. As the shuttle prepares for re-entry, the hydraulics for the Pas-Com malfunction, preventing it from being retracted, but the fault is corrected just in time. The shuttle lands and the ride ends. The script was written by Tim Prokop, who also wrote the scripts for the preshow and post-show.

The fictional events take place in 2094.

The movie was shown for a short while at Six Flags Over Texas, and was made by DreamQuest Images.

== Shuttle ==
Outside the building that houses the queue and the ride itself is a fiberglass mock-up of a Space Shuttle orbiter that has authentic "tiles" used in actual Space Shuttle orbiters. The shuttle was built to the exact scale of the real STS craft, but is neither an official NASA shuttle nor capable of spaceflight.

== Other movies ==
The building that shows Space Shuttle America also showed:

- Escape from Dino Island in 3D (1999–2001)
- Stargate SG-3000 (2004–2005)
- Superstition (Playing during Fright Fest in 2001, 2003, 2005, 2006, and 2007 and maybe before 2001)

== Removal ==
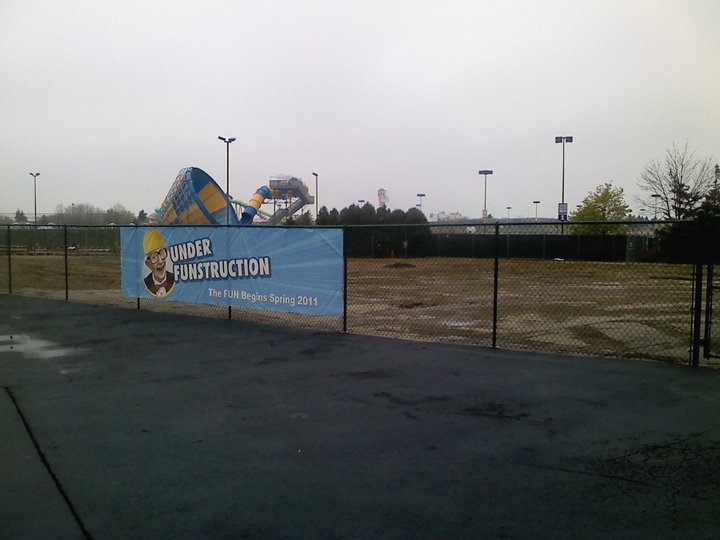
The former site in May 2010 before the Riptide Bay water park expansion

High operating costs and dwindling popularity doomed Space Shuttle America after a thirteen year run. Its final operating season was 2007. For the following time period when the ride was closed, the interior was used as a temporary office/storage by employees. The shuttle and building were finally removed in December 2009. After plans to build a roller coaster on the site were canceled, the park expanded Hurricane Harbor into the area for the 2011 season.
