= Polin Waterparks =

Turkish water ride manufacturer and designer

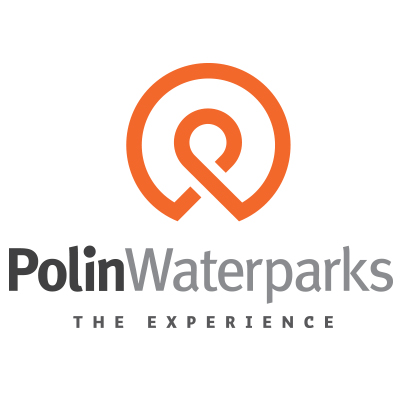
- Type: Private
- Industry: Water park manufacturing
- Founded: 1976
- Founder: Enver Pakiş
- Headquarters: Istanbul, Turkey
- Area served: Global, 116 countries
- Products: Water slides and water play attractions
- Services: Water park design, manufacturing, engineering, and installation
- Number of employees: 550 (2019)
- Website: www.polin.com.tr

Polin Waterparks is a Turkish manufacturer of water slides and water parks. The company was founded in Istanbul, Turkey in 1976.

== History ==
Polin was founded in Istanbul in 1976 by architect Enver Pakiş as a fiberglass design and manufacturing company.

Polin uses a technique called resin transfer molding (RTM) in their water slide manufacturing process.

== Locations ==
All of Polin's production takes place in Turkey. Sales offices are located in France, Russia, Morocco, Macedonia, and China. Through 2013, Polin completed its manufacturing in three plants located in Turkey.

== Awards ==
- 2014 – Cartoon Network Amazone in Pattaya, Thailand – WWA Leading Edge Award
- 2014 – King Cobra in Aqualand Frejus, France – Europe's Best Waterslide by Kirmes and Park Revue Magazine
- 2014 – H2O Waterpark in Rostov-on-Don, Russia – Golden Pony Award for Excellence
- 2013 – King Cobra in Aqualand Frejus, France – "Most Innovative Product" in the Entertainment Category of the 2013 Turk Kompozit Composites Summit
- 2012 – "Export Winner of Turkey" in SMSE Category
- 2012 – Golden Pony Award for Excellence
- 2011 – Acquavillage Waterpark – "Best Italian Waterpark" by Parksmania
- 2008 – Odissea 2000 Waterpark is awarded as "Best Italian Waterpark" due to the new attraction: Polin's Windigo by Parksmania Club
