= Verrückt =

Demolished water slide in Kansas

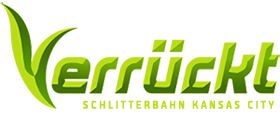

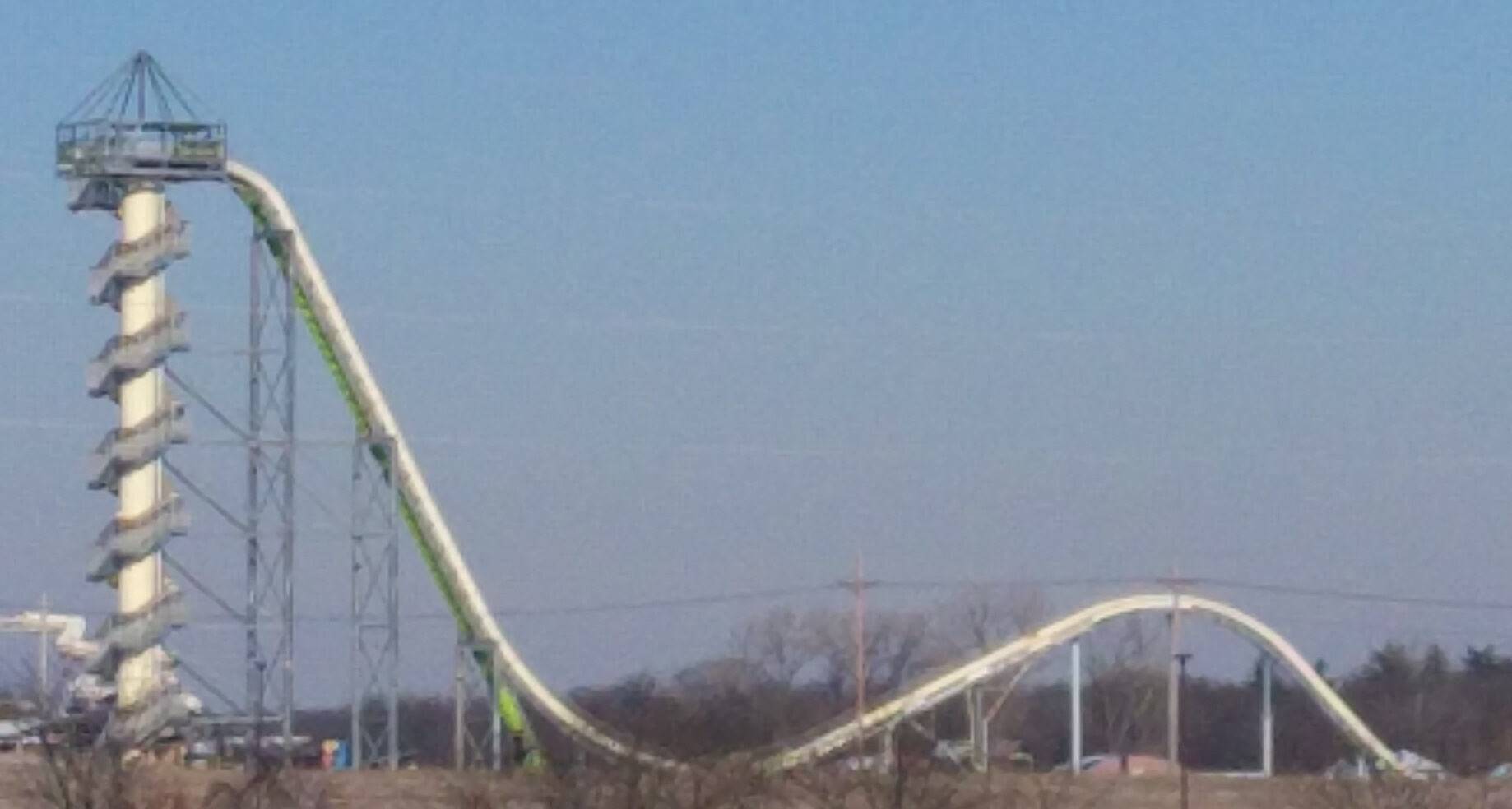
- Verrückt, as seen from Interstate 435

Schlitterbahn Kansas City
- Coordinates: 39.1209°N 94.8064°W
- Status: Removed
- Cost: $3.6 million
- Opening date: July 10, 2014
- Closing date: August 7, 2016

General statistics
- Designer: Jeff Henry & John Schooley
- Model: Water coaster
- Height: 168 ft (51 m)
- Speed: 70 mph (110 km/h)
- Max vertical angle: 60°
- Boats: 10 boats. Riders are arranged 1 across in 3 rows for a total of 3 riders per boat.
- Height restriction: 54 in (137 cm)

Verrückt (German meaning "crazy" or "insane", pronounced [fɛɐ̯ˈʁʏkt]) was a custom water coaster water slide located at the Schlitterbahn Kansas City water park in Kansas City, Kansas, United States. At the height of 168 feet 7 inches (51.38 m), Verrückt became the world's tallest water slide when it opened on July 10, 2014, surpassing Kilimanjaro at Aldeia das Águas Park Resort in Brazil. The ride was designed at the park, led by John Schooley with assistance from park co-owner Jeff Henry. It was featured on an episode of Xtreme Waterparks on the Travel Channel in June 2014, shortly before the ride opened. (Note: As of 2019, the episode, and any mention of it or Verrückt, has been deleted from the Travel Channel's website.) Verrückt permanently closed on August 7, 2016, following a fatal incident involving the decapitation of Caleb Schwab, the 10-year-old son of Kansas state legislator Scott Schwab, who later became Kansas secretary of state.

Verrückt had been scheduled to open in June 2013, but construction and safety testing issues caused multiple delays, including incidents in which sandbags loaded into rafts during testing went airborne. The ride's final design made rafts reach a maximum speed of 70 mph (110 km/h). Verrückt was well-received upon opening, winning a Golden Ticket Award from Amusement Today in 2014.

After Schwab's death, amusement park safety laws were updated to require state inspection of all attractions. It was later revealed that at least 13 other riders had previously sustained non-fatal injuries from contact with the netting above the slide. Criminal charges were filed against several individuals, including Schooley and Henry, which were later dismissed due to procedural issues in the case. The incident was followed by a decline in Schlitterbahn's business operations, and the park closed in September 2018. Verrückt was dismantled two months later, and the remainder of the park was demolished in 2021.

== History ==
=== Background ===
Original plans for Schlitterbahn Kansas City, the first Schlitterbahn Waterparks site outside Texas, proposed a $750 million complex including hotels and resort facilities. Officials in Wyandotte County, Kansas, where the project was planned, welcomed the announcement in 2005 viewing it as the result of efforts to encourage residents of the Kansas City metropolitan area to spend their disposable income in Kansas rather than Missouri. Kansas state legislators from the area passed legislation allowing Schlitterbahn to self-inspect its attractions without state oversight as it did in Texas, unlike all other amusement parks in Kansas, which were subject to state inspection.

The complete plans never came to fruition. Beginning in 2007, the Great Recession forced many amusement park operators, including Schlitterbahn, to scale back their plans and prioritize the profitability of existing parks. Schlitterbahn Kansas City was reduced to a $180 million park without lodging and was not open for an entire season until 2010. It was successful, but not to the degree Schlitterbahn and co-owner Jeff Henry had initially expected.

=== Construction ===
In November 2012, Schlitterbahn announced plans to create the world's tallest and fastest water slide at its Kansas City park, to open in mid-2013. No name was given during the announcement, and details on the height of the ride were kept secret to ensure that the completed ride would set a world record for its creation.

Verrückt's concept was spontaneously conceived by Henry during a trade show after a team from Travel Channel's Xtreme Waterparks asked what he was working on. Initial attempts to pitch the idea to vendors at the show failed, so Henry decided to build the slide himself, enlisting John Schooley as the ride's lead designer. Henry had described the new ride to the Travel Channel crew as a "speed blaster", a term he had likewise improvised. He and Schooley knew that Schlitterbahn had to live up to the hype Henry had created and design something previously unheard of. "Basically we were crazy enough to try anything", Schooley recalled.

Henry pressed his design team to complete the ride faster than usual, forcing many staff to work almost constantly. Calculations that normally required three to six months were completed in five weeks. As they began testing, rafts repeatedly became airborne on the ride's large bottom hump.

In November 2013, the ride was officially named Verrückt, the German word for crazy or insane, with the opening date pushed back until the start of the park's 2014 season. The Guinness Book of World Records named Verrückt the world's tallest water slide in April 2014, before construction was completed. With a height of 168 feet 7 inches (51.38 m), it surpassed Kilimanjaro at Aldeia das Águas Park Resort in Brazil. When the park opened, delays in construction and testing of the ride led to its opening date being pushed back to June 5, and then June 29, after the lower portion of the ride was rebuilt, to coincide with a television special about the ride; the park later canceled this opening date and two days of media previews following further delays.

In 2019, an unnamed lifeguard who had worked at the park told Esquire magazine that the park primarily conducted some of the later tests of the slide after operating hours, with observation limited to selected employees, typically those with longer tenure. The lifeguard stated that, in his account, the only instance he observed in which the slide completed a run without interruption was during the episode filmed for the Travel Channel, and that in this case the raft still became stuck on the second hump. He further reported that sandbags used in test runs frequently became airborne at that point, including in leaked footage that later circulated online. The lifeguard also stated that "I told my friends and family it was only a matter of time until someone died on Verrückt".

A safety consultant hired by the park shortly before Verrückt's scheduled opening told Henry that the attraction was incomplete and unsafe. When complete, he recommended that only riders aged 16 and over be allowed on the ride. Henry, who did not have formal engineering training, set the minimum age at 14, and shortly before the opening, he removed the age restriction entirely.

=== Operation ===
Verrückt was eventually completed and officially opened on July 10, 2014, attracting national media coverage. Among the first riders was then-Kansas Governor Sam Brownback. Some riders who were aware of test footage showing 110-pound (50 kg) sandbags becoming airborne nevertheless chose to ride. One local judge told Esquire later that she rode the water slide ten times that day, and an employee who had loaded the sandbags during testing said he went down twenty times over its first two days. "That should tell you something about how I felt about it," he said. Henry and Schooley noted that several rafts appeared to become airborne over the lower hump before entering the netting system intended to keep riders on the slide. In September 2014, Verrückt was voted the world's "Best New Waterpark Ride" at the 2014 Golden Ticket Awards.

At least thirteen riders suffered non-fatal injuries—such as concussions and herniated discs, many with long-term effects—after either hitting the ride's netting or being thrown into it. In June 2016, a rider from Missouri who was ejected from a raft suffered facial injuries; it was later alleged that the park's operations manager attempted to cover up the incident by influencing how lifeguards documented the incident, and similar actions were suspected in other cases.

Accounts from riders indicate that even some who were not injured found the ride unsettling. One rider from Kansas City reported that the ride's Velcro restraints came loose after the first drop, requiring him to hold auxiliary straps. A local woman whose boyfriend held her in the raft likewise noted to Esquire that the netting and hoops on the lower hump showed signs of repeated human collisions.

== Design ==
Verrückt was designed with two major drops, beginning with an initial descent equivalent to approximately 17 stories, followed by an uphill midsection of about five stories. The attraction used three-person rafts, each weighing approximately 100 pounds (45 kg), which were transported to the top of the slide by conveyor, while riders accessed the platform by climbing 264 steps. To reduce the risk of rafts lifting off the slide, rider groups were weighed twice—once at the base and again at the top—to ensure a combined weight between 400 pounds (180 kg) and 550 pounds (250 kg); single riders were required to weigh less than 300 pounds (140 kg).

The starting point, at a height of 168 feet (51 m), exceeded both the height of Niagara Falls and the foot-to-torch section of the Statue of Liberty. Because this height surpassed the 120-foot (37 m) limit permitted by local zoning codes, the project required a variance. The final height was an increase from the original design of 148 feet (45 m). After the ride’s height was announced and its world-record status was certified on April 25, 2014, Schlitterbahn dismantled much of the lower portion of the structure in order to rebuild and re-engineer it, following test results in which sandbags were ejected from the ride. As part of these changes, the angle of the second drop was reduced from 45 degrees to 22 degrees, the uphill section was lengthened by 5 feet (1.5 m) to reduce speed, and a series of metal hoops with netting were added in areas where rafts had left the track during early testing.

== Fatal incident ==
On August 7, 2016, Caleb Schwab, the 10-year-old son of Kansas state representative Scott Schwab, died while riding Verrückt. The raft he was riding became airborne during the ascent of the second hump and struck a metal support of the netting, decapitating him. The other two passengers, both women, were injured in the incident – one suffered a broken jaw, while the other suffered a facial bone fracture and needed stitches. In the immediate aftermath, Schlitterbahn Kansas City was closed pending an inspection. Although the park reopened three days later, the ride remained closed.

Reportedly, Caleb, who weighed 74 pounds (34 kg), had been allowed to sit in the front of the raft rather than between the two women accompanying him – one weighed 275 pounds (125 kg), while the other weighed 197 pounds (89 kg). This created an uneven weight distribution, which some experts concluded may have contributed to the raft going airborne. However, the total weight of 546 pounds (248 kg) was less than the maximum recommended weight of 550 pounds (250 kg). Engineers who inspected the ride also commented that the ride's netting, used in areas where riders travel up to 70 miles per hour (110 km/h), "posed its own hazard because a rider moving at high speeds could easily lose a limb if they hit it". Their findings revealed that the use of the metal brace and netting system in the design, along with the use of hook and loop straps to restrain the riders, violated guidelines set by ASTM F-24 Committee on Amusement Ride and Devices. According to the guidelines, Verrückt should have incorporated rigid over-the-shoulder restraints for riders and an upstop mechanism to prevent the rafts from going airborne.

== Aftermath ==
After Scott Schwab spoke to his fellow legislators about his son's death, they voted to change the law that had allowed Schlitterbahn to self-inspect, requiring that the state regularly inspect all the state's amusement park attractions. In November 2016, Schlitterbahn announced that Verrückt would be demolished following the conclusion of a criminal investigation. The Schwab family settled with several involved parties, including Schlitterbahn, for approximately $20 million in early 2017. Settlements involving the other two riders injured in the accident were undisclosed.

In July 2018, a judge approved a plan by the park to disassemble Verrückt beginning the following September. The ride's teardown was placed on hold indefinitely in August 2018, resulting from ongoing discussions in multiple court cases that were filed after the incident. The park eventually began dismantling the ride in November 2018, and the work to remove the ride was completed within two months. The park did not operate the following season, and Schlitterbahn's reputation and finances were negatively impacted. Two of the company's water parks in Texas were sold in June 2019 for about $261 million to Cedar Fair, a major owner of amusement parks nationwide, including Kansas City, Missouri's Worlds of Fun and Oceans of Fun.

=== Criminal charges ===
On March 23, 2018, a grand jury issued an indictment against Schlitterbahn and Tyler Austin Miles, former director of operations, charging them with involuntary manslaughter, aggravated battery, aggravated child endangerment, and interference with law enforcement. The indictment accused the park of negligence, concealing design flaws, and downplaying the severity of previous injuries reported on the ride.

The 2018 indictment against Schlitterbahn wrote that Jeff Henry and John Schooley "lacked technical expertise to design a properly functioning water slide" and did not perform standard engineering procedures or calculations on how the slide would operate. Instead, they used "crude trial-and-error methods" to test its performance out of haste to launch the ride. According to court documents, Schooley conceded that, "If we actually knew how to do this, and it could be done that easily, it wouldn't be that spectacular."

Three days later, on March 26, Henry was arrested in Cameron County, Texas, in connection with the incident. One day later, on March 27, the Kansas Attorney General's office released a new indictment against Henry, Schooley, and Henry & Sons Construction Company — privately owned by Schlitterbahn — charging them with second-degree murder in addition to seventeen other felonies. Schooley was arrested at Dallas/Fort Worth International Airport after returning from a trip to China on April 2, 2018. The defendants were arraigned in April 2018, and the first criminal trial began in October.

On February 22, 2019, criminal charges were dismissed against Henry, Schooley, and Miles because inadmissible evidence had been presented to the grand jury. The judge's ruling reprimanded state attorneys for presenting the Xtreme Waterparks episode to jurors as fact, instead of as a "fictional and dramatized version of events created for entertainment purposes," and expert witnesses for claiming that the designers of the slide were negligent in not following ASTM standards, though the law at the time did not require that those standards be followed.
