= Tsunami Surge =

WhiteWater West water coaster

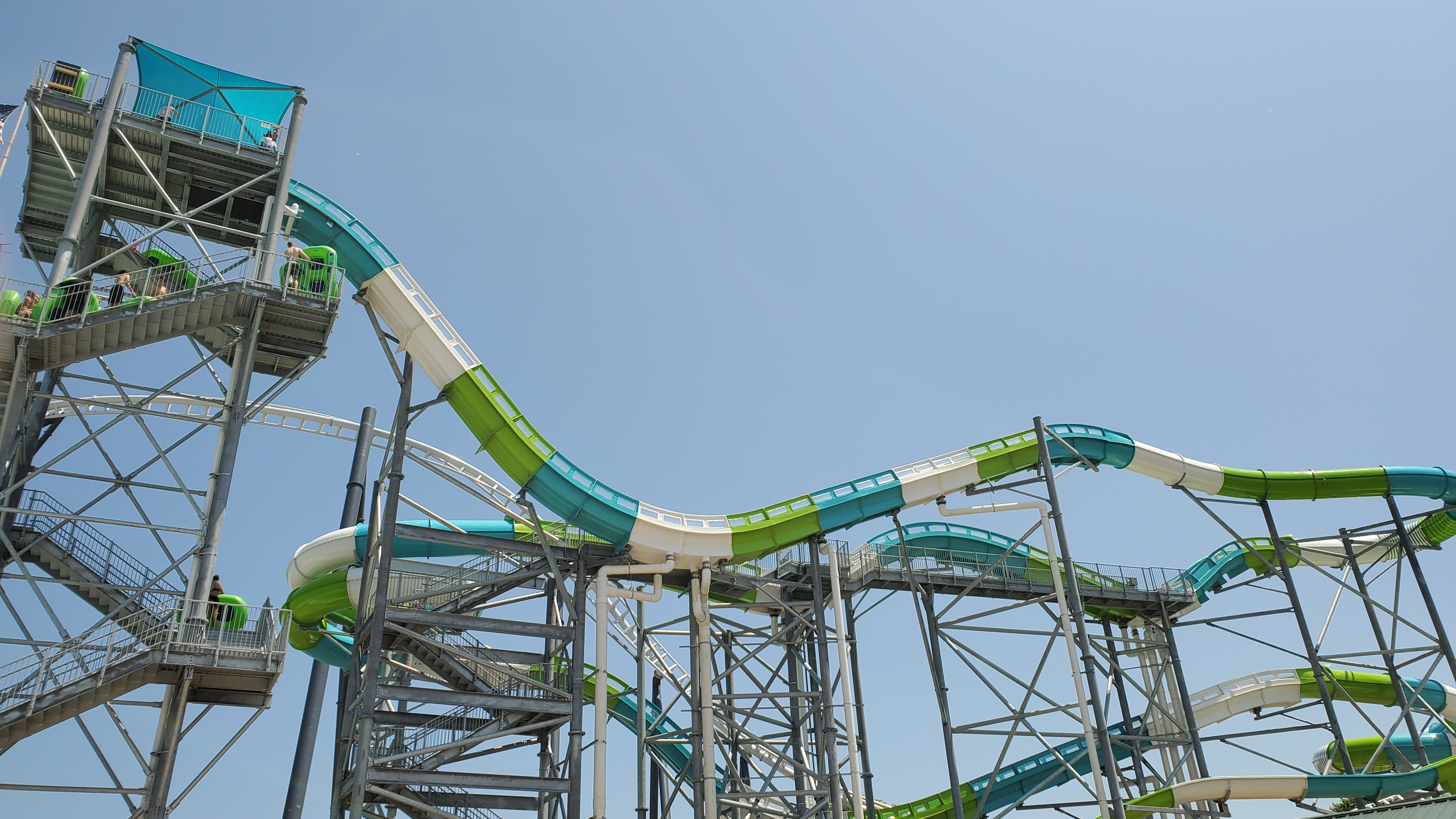
- The total layout of the attraction

Six Flags Hurricane Harbor Chicago
- Area: Riptide Bay
- Coordinates: 42.3686°N 87.9367°W
- Status: Operating
- Soft opening date: May 27, 2021
- Opening date: May 29, 2021

General statistics
- Type: Water coaster
- Manufacturer: WhiteWater West
- Model: Master Blaster
- Height: 86 ft (26 m)
- Length: 950 ft (290 m)
- Speed: 28 mph (45 km/h)
- Capacity: 320 riders per hour
- Duration: 1:08
- Boats: Several boats. Riders are arranged 1 across in 2 rows for a total of 2 riders per boat.
- Height restriction: 48 in (122 cm)

Tsunami Surge is a water coaster located in Six Flags Hurricane Harbor Chicago in Gurnee, Illinois, United States. Manufactured by WhiteWater West, the water coaster opened on May 29, 2021, and is currently the tallest water coaster in North America at 86 feet (26 m). It was formerly the tallest water coaster in the world from 2021 to 2025. Originally planned for a 2020 opening, it was delayed by a year due to the COVID-19 pandemic.

== History ==
On August 29, 2019, Six Flags Great America announced Tsunami Surge, in which the park claims as the tallest water coaster in the world. The attraction would be located across from Maxx Force, utilizing the former Pictorium site. As the 25th attraction at the water park, Tsunami Surge would utilize "AquaLucent" effects.

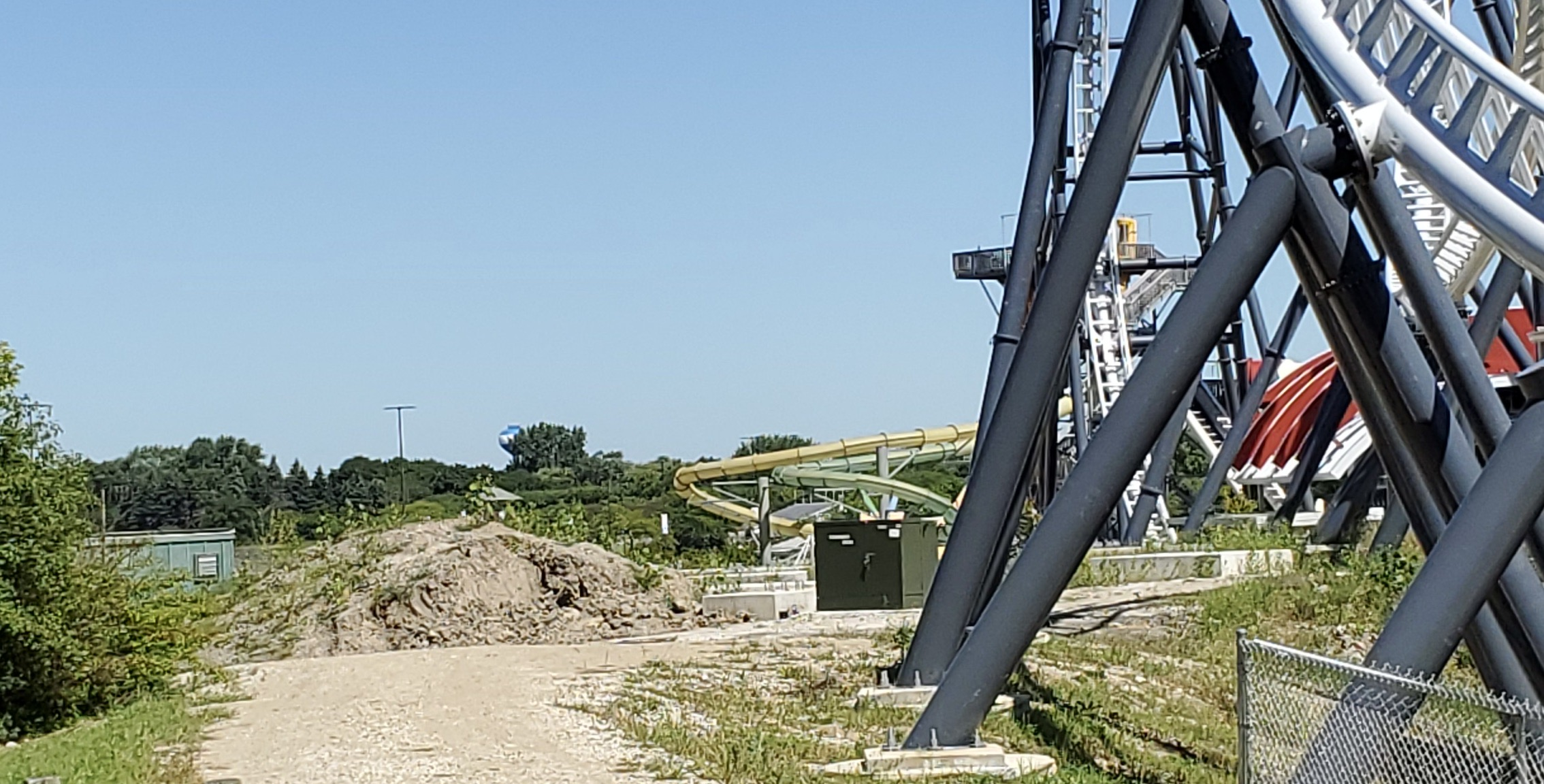
The construction site of Tsunami Surge in 2020.

More plans were announced at the American Coaster Enthusiasts' No Coaster Con event on January 18, 2020, in which the park announced that groundbreaking was in early-January, and had released the renderings for the attraction. Later in March of that year, the park had temporarily paused construction due to the COVID-19 pandemic.

After the announcement that Six Flags Hurricane Harbor Chicago would be separate from Six Flags Great America, the park confirmed that Tsunami Surge would be opening for the 2021 season. Soft opening for the attraction began on May 27, 2021, for the media, and the attraction's grand opening was on May 29, 2021.

On March 21, 2025, Tsunami Surge lost its ranking as the tallest water coaster in the world upon the opening of the Surreal water coaster at Beach Park in Fortaleza, Brazil; the Surreal water coaster is 91 feet (28 m) tall. However, Tsunami Surge is still the tallest water coaster in North America as of 2025.

== Ride description ==
The ride starts 86 feet (26 m) above, and drops into the ride's first uphill blast, and turns left into its second uphill blasts. After the second blast, the ride turns into a helix before its turn into the final uphill blast. After two turns, the ride has two pre-drops, before dropping into a splashdown section.

In total, the water coaster features five turns, five drops and three uphill blasts. The attraction utilizes "AquaLucent" effects during each turn, which create "bursts of colors" and "dreamlike patterns" during the turns.

== Awards ==
Six Flags Hurricane Harbor Chicago, WhiteWater West and Ramaker won an award for the Leading Edge Award in August 2021 by the World Waterpark Association for their work on the attraction. Additionally, the next month, the ride placed third place in Best New Water Slide on Amusement Today's Golden Ticket Awards.

Preceded by MASSIV Water Coaster	World's Tallest Water Coaster; May 29, 2021 – March 21, 2025	Succeeded by Surreal
