= Schlitterbahn Kansas City =

Former water park in Kansas City, Kansas

Schlitterbahn Waterpark Kansas City
- Interactive map of Schlitterbahn Waterpark Kansas City
- Location: Kansas City, Kansas, United States
- Coordinates: 39°07′15″N 94°48′15″W
- Opened: July 15, 2009
- Closed: September 3, 2018
- Area: 370 acres (150 ha)
- Pools: 2 pools
- Water slides: 14 water slides
- Children's areas: 2 children's areas

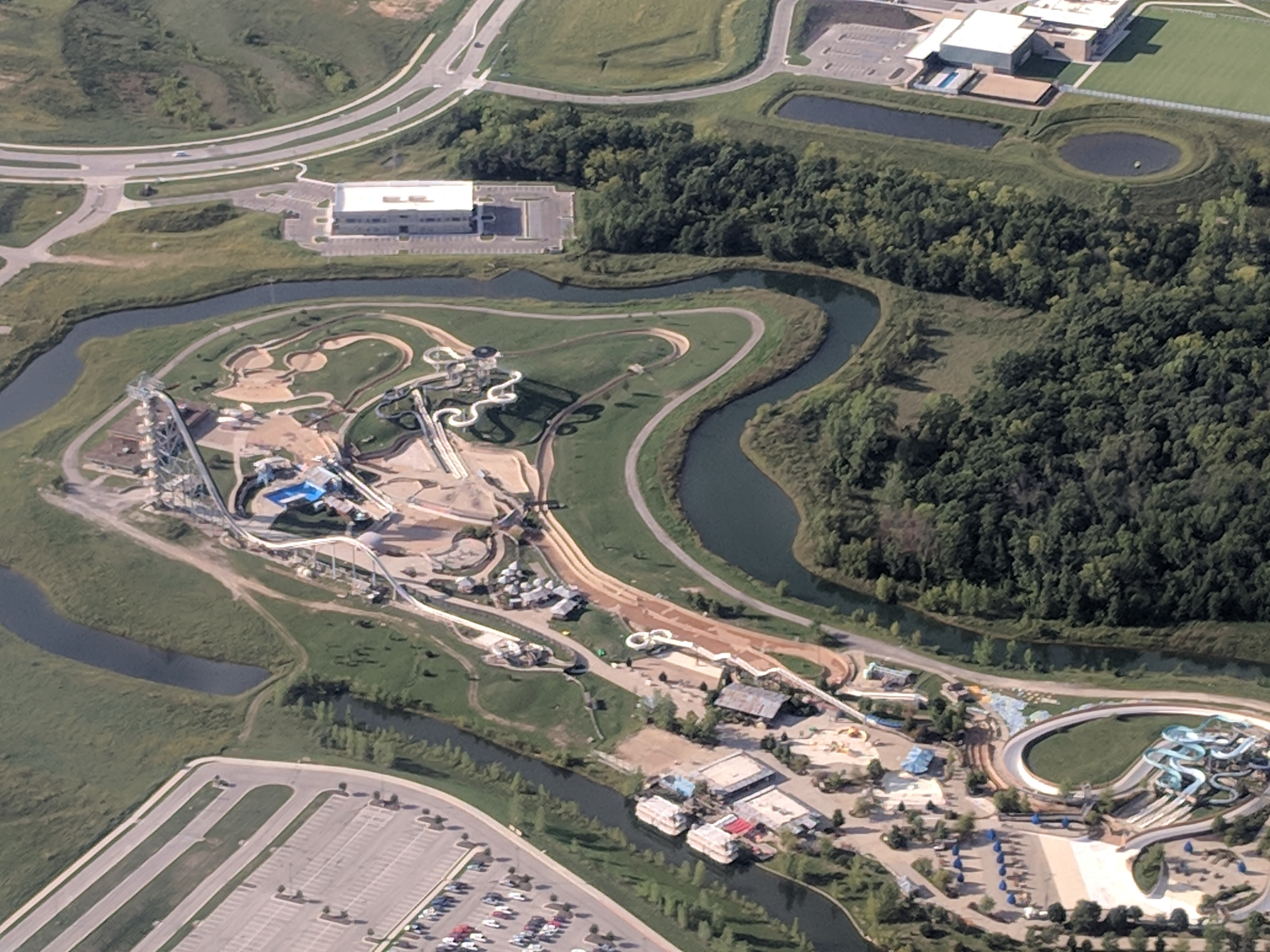
Aerial photo of Schlitterbahn Kansas City in September 2018

Schlitterbahn Waterpark Kansas City was a water park in Kansas City, Kansas. It was announced in September 2005 by Schlitterbahn Waterparks and opened on July 15, 2009. It was conceived as a 370-acre (150-hectare) and $750 million development including a nearly 40-acre (16-hectare) waterpark, which was Schlitterbahn's fourth waterpark and its first outside Texas.

Groundbreaking was on September 18, 2007, on the land formerly occupied by the Wyandotte County Fairgrounds and the Unified Government courthouse annex, across Interstate 435 from the Kansas Speedway and Village West.

Following a fatal accident on the nearly 170 ft tall Verrückt water slide in 2016, the park permanently closed on September 3, 2018. In the end, $180 million of work was completed.

== History ==
Phase 1 included the opening of 12 water attractions, 3 restaurants, and 2 shops. Three attractions were purchased from the former Geauga Lake amusement park in Ohio. Phase 2, named Schlitterbahn Vacation Village Resort, was originally planned to include over 1,000 hotel rooms, a Scheels sporting goods store, and a Riverwalk area consisting of shops and restaurants on 300 acres surrounding the water park. Those plans were stalled and eventually abandoned due to the then Great Recession. An expansion of the water park opened on April 30, 2011, with six new attractions.

=== Verrückt and accident ===
In November 2012, Schlitterbahn Waterparks announced plans for the world's tallest and fastest water slide, Verrückt. Verrückt was designed by Schlitterbahn co-owner Jeff Henry as a three-person raft slide with an uphill section. The initial drop was a 17-story plunge with a five-story uphill section. At 168 feet 7 inches (51.38 m), the starting point was taller than Niagara Falls and reached a maximum speed of 65 miles per hour (105 km/h). It opened on July 10, 2014, after multiple delays.

In August 2016, 10-year old Caleb Schwab, the son of Scott Schwab, the future Kansas Secretary of State, was killed while riding Verrückt. The death occurred when the raft he was in went airborne at the lower bump and struck a metal support of the netting, decapitating him. The other two passengers, both women, were injured in the incident — one suffered a broken jaw, while the other suffered a facial bone fracture and needed stitches. In the immediate aftermath, the park was closed pending an inspection. Although the park reopened three days later, the ride remained closed.

=== Aftermath ===
In 2018, the last operating season of the park, four attractions remained closed throughout the season after an audit by regulators found that each did not comply with the Kansas Amusement Ride Act. Demolition of Verrückt began in November 2018.

The park did not open for the 2019 season. On June 13, 2019, Cedar Fair (now Six Flags) agreed to buy Schlitterbahn's two parks in New Braunfels and Galveston for a price of $261 million. Additionally, Cedar Fair had the option for up to 120 days to buy the Kansas City location "for an additional $6 million". Cedar Fair did not pursue purchasing the property within those 120 days and the park remained standing but not operating.

On November 6, 2020, Homefield LLC signed an agreement with the Unified Government of Wyandotte County and Kansas City, Kansas to fund the redevelopment of the former Schlitterbahn lot for $90 million into an amateur sports complex. Plans called for the total demolition of the remaining Schlitterbahn structures, which was to begin before July 2021. The adjacent Wyandotte County Courthouse Annex building was demolished beginning in February 2021, and the demolition of Schlitterbahn was completed before September. As of 2023, the parking lot and the base for the park's sign are the only remaining structures from the park.
