= Six Flags Entertainment Village =

Cancelled resort complex in Gurnee, Illinois

- Concept art for Six Flags Entertainment Village. Six Flags Great America can be seen in the top left of the concept art.
- Location: Gurnee, Illinois, USA
- Coordinates: 42°22′01″N 87°56′37″W
- Opened: 2000 (planned)
- Developer: Prism Development
- Owner: Six Flags
- Architect: Richard de Flon

Six Flags Entertainment Village was a proposed 134-acre (54 ha) resort complex in Gurnee, Illinois, United States, across and west of Six Flags Great America, near Interstate 94. With its land owned by Six Flags, it was planned to be developed by Prism Development and was estimated to be US$400 million. It was expected to feature a water park, hotel, outdoor shopping mall, and theater.

This project was projected to generate over US$10,500,000 annually and attract 400,000 visitors each year. Construction was scheduled for multiple phases, with initial plans to open in 2000, and full completion of the project by 2002.

Opposition to Six Flags Entertainment Village arose in 1998 when towns and citizens criticized the project. A citizens group was formed titled "Citizens United for a Residential Village of Gurnee" (CURV), which opposed the resort due to concerns of overdevelopment, congestion, and rising tax prices. Plans for the complex stalled in 1999 after a majority of Gurnee residents voted against it on an advisory referendum.

== History ==
=== Background ===
In 1972, Marriott had purchased 600 acres (240 ha) of land around the Interstate 94 tollway, which was split by the tollway. The land to the east of Interstate 94 would be occupied by the Marriott's Great America (now Six Flags Great America) theme park, while the land to the west of Interstate 94 would be planned for a future hotel expansion. During construction of the theme park, the land to the west was occupied by early administrative offices and warehouses. Originally, an interchange was planned in 1973 by the Marriott Corporation on Interstate 94 for the planned expansion, but was rejected because the interchange could not lead into private property.

=== 1996: Initial water park plans ===
In May 1996, representatives from the Six Flags Great America amusement park met with officials from the village of Gurnee, Illinois, to obtain permission to build a new water park on a plot of land west of Six Flags Great America, across Interstate 94. The water park was planned to open in 1998 if approved. However, a spokesperson for the amusement park stated that plans were premature and might not proceed. Since the land that Six Flags wanted to use was not zoned accordingly, it would require a special-use permit.

=== 1997: Announcement and planning ===
Plans for a 136-acre (55 ha) resort complex were announced at a Gurnee board meeting on October 29, 1997. Titled Six Flags Entertainment Village, it would be on a separate plot of land west of Six Flags Great America, across Interstate 94, with the tollway dividing the two properties. It was described as "pedestrian-friendly," with small shops, a theme park, hotel, and an 8,000 to 12,000 seat multipurpose center included in the plans for the resort. The feasibility of the resort would be studied by a panel appointed by the then-mayor of Gurnee, Richard Welton. On October 30, 1997, the panel announced it would need more time to study and discuss the plans for the project, as they needed to develop recommendations on the project.

Gurnee officials later created an oversight committee on November 3, 1997, to keep the Gurnee village board updated on details after a trustee voiced concerns about the board being "out of the loop." This committee would operate independently from another committee that operates with the project's developer Prism Development. The Gurnee board postponed the appointment of the oversight committee a week after, on November 10, 1997, after the board had voted to invite Prism Development to make a presentation. Welton recommended that the board should be updated on the project's status before trustees were appointed for the oversight committee.

Prism Development proposed a four-way interchange near Washington Street, stating that it was "absolutely required" for the project "to become a reality." The interchange would divert traffic from the main entrance at Grand Avenue and would allow guests to instead get into both properties from either side. Part of the plan also included widening Washington Street into a four-lane road. Despite the proposition, consultants from Metro Transportation Group Inc. stated that the interchange would be necessary once later phases of the project began, with the estimation of phase one starting in 1999 and phase two starting in 2002. Additionally, the interchange would also require approval from the Illinois State Toll Highway Authority, Lake County, Illinois, and the village of Gurnee, but mayor Welton stated the interchange would create additional opportunities.

=== 1998: Government approval and resident opposition ===
On June 10, 1998, the village president of Long Grove, Illinois, Lenore Simmons, said Gurnee "failed to be a good neighbor" after concerns over Six Flags Entertainment Village's potential to deplete highway funds to work on the four-lane expansion on Washington Street. Welton charged back by stating developments near Washington Street had to pay impact fees, including the Gurnee Mills shopping mall, which had to pay US$4 million in infrastructure payments. Welton also stated the street was already congested before the proposal of the complex, and the complex would be used to solve the problems.

Changes to the initial proposition were announced at a joint meeting on June 18, 1998, with officials from Prism Development and Six Flags Great America, along with architect Richard de Flon. This included the area of the project being reduced from 136-acre (55 ha) to 134-acre (54 ha), and excluding the 8,000 to 12,000 seat stadium. However, the development would additionally include housing for employees and a theater. This came along a request for a special-use permit to use the planned site, as the land was zoned for industrial use. However, the zoning board disagreed with the proposition and suggested Six Flags and Prism meet at a different time.

The Gurnee Plan Commission officially endorsed the proposal for Six Flags Entertainment Village in November 1998, although it sparked opposition within the village towards the resort. This resulted in a 10-member citizens' group named "Citizens United for a Residential Village of Gurnee" (shortened to CURV) to be formed. CURV cited overdevelopment, congestion and rising property values as reasons opposing the planned resort. In December 1998, CURV created a petition for the village to include an advisory referendum on a spring voting ballot on whether or not the resort should be built.

Despite resident opposition, the village of Gurnee approved plans to build the complex on December 8, 1998. This allowed for Six Flags and Prism Development to start talking with hotel operators. Prism Development clarified that the water park, hotel, and conference center are priorities for construction, and more developments would be built after.

=== 1999: Village vote and cancellation ===
In early-February 1999, the advisory referendum on whether or not the resort should be built was included in the ballot after the petition had reached its signature goal. Election results were released in April 1999, and it was revealed that more than half of Gurnee residents disagreed with the village board's plan to construct the Six Flags Entertainment Village. The project was officially stalled in October 1999 after three years of planning and development.

=== 2000s—present: Post-cancellation ===
Plans to build a water park near Six Flags Great America succeeded in 2004, when the park announced they would build a new 13-acre (5.3 ha) water park. Unlike the Entertainment Village project, the water park would be located on the same plot of land as Six Flags Great America. It would be adjacent to the theme park, replacing the preexisting theme park's west parking lot. Named Six Flags Hurricane Harbor, the water park opened on May 28, 2005, as a US$42 million expansion to Six Flags Great America.

== Complex layout ==
Type	Notes	Ref.
Water park	Intended to be a "water theme park"	
Shopping mall	Outdoor shopping mall, including restaurants	
Multi-purpose stadium	8,000 to 12,000 seat center; later removed from plans	
Hotel	500 rooms, intended to be a four star hotel	
Convention center	—N/a	
Employee housing	Housing for seasonal employees	
Theater	A performing arts theater	
Pond	Intended for paddleboarding and ice skating	
Conservation area	25 acres (10 ha)	

== See also ==
- Marriott's Great America (Maryland–Virginia), a proposed theme park which was canceled due to resident opposition
- Six Flags Hurricane Harbor Chicago, a water park adjacent to Six Flags Great America that opened in 2005
