= Esther Nakajjigo =

Ugandan activist (c. 1995–2020)

- Nakajjigo in 2019
- Born: c. 1995; Munyonyo, Uganda
- Died: June 13, 2020 (aged 24–25); Arches National Park, Utah
- Education: Muteesa I Royal University
- Known for: Humanitarianism
- Spouse: Ludovic Michaud (m. 2020)

Esther Nakajjigo (c. 1995 – 13 June 2020) was a Ugandan humanitarian and human rights activist. She was named Uganda's ambassador of hope for women and girls by the World Health Organization. Nakajjigo founded the Princess Diana Health Centre in Munyonyo. Nakjjigo was a TV presenter of the reality shows "Saving Innocence Project" and "Lift: Living in the Face of Trauma".

== Life ==
Nakajjigo was born in Munyonyo to Mr. and Mrs. Katergga. She is the first of five children. At the age of 14, Nakajjigo volunteered as a peer educator at the Kiruddu Health Centre. The same year, she established the Women Health Team, a non-governmental organization aimed at educating and supporting women in Kalangala. After the Kiruddu Health Centre closed for renovations, her mother gave her land in Munyonyo to build the Princess Diana Health Centre. She worked to help decrease the number of teenage pregnancies. For her efforts, at the age of 17, the World Health Organization named her Uganda's ambassador of hope for women and girls.

Nakajjigo was a presenter on Bukedde TV. She established the reality show titled "Saving Innocence Project" to help young girls who have dropped out of school. The show won a Geneva Award. Nakajjigo started the "Lift: Living in the Face of Trauma" reality show. She won the 2015 and 2016 World Savers awards which provided Nakajjigo with a scholarship from the Kabaka of Buganda to attend Muteesa I Royal University. In 2018, she was completing a bachelor's degree in social work and social administration. She was a 2018 recipient of a Mandela Washington Fellowship. In June 2018, she launched the Global Girls Movement in Brussels.

On 13 June 2019, Nakajjigo met Ludovic Michaud in Aurora, Colorado, through Tinder. They married in a courthouse ceremony in March 2020. On 13 June 2020, Nakajjigo was decapitated by a metal gate while visiting Arches National Park with her husband. In January 2023, her family was awarded US$10,500,000 (equivalent to $11,095,183 in 2025) in damages by the federal government of the United States.
