= Six Flags Hurricane Harbor Chicago =

Water park in Gurnee, Illinois

- Logo used since 2021

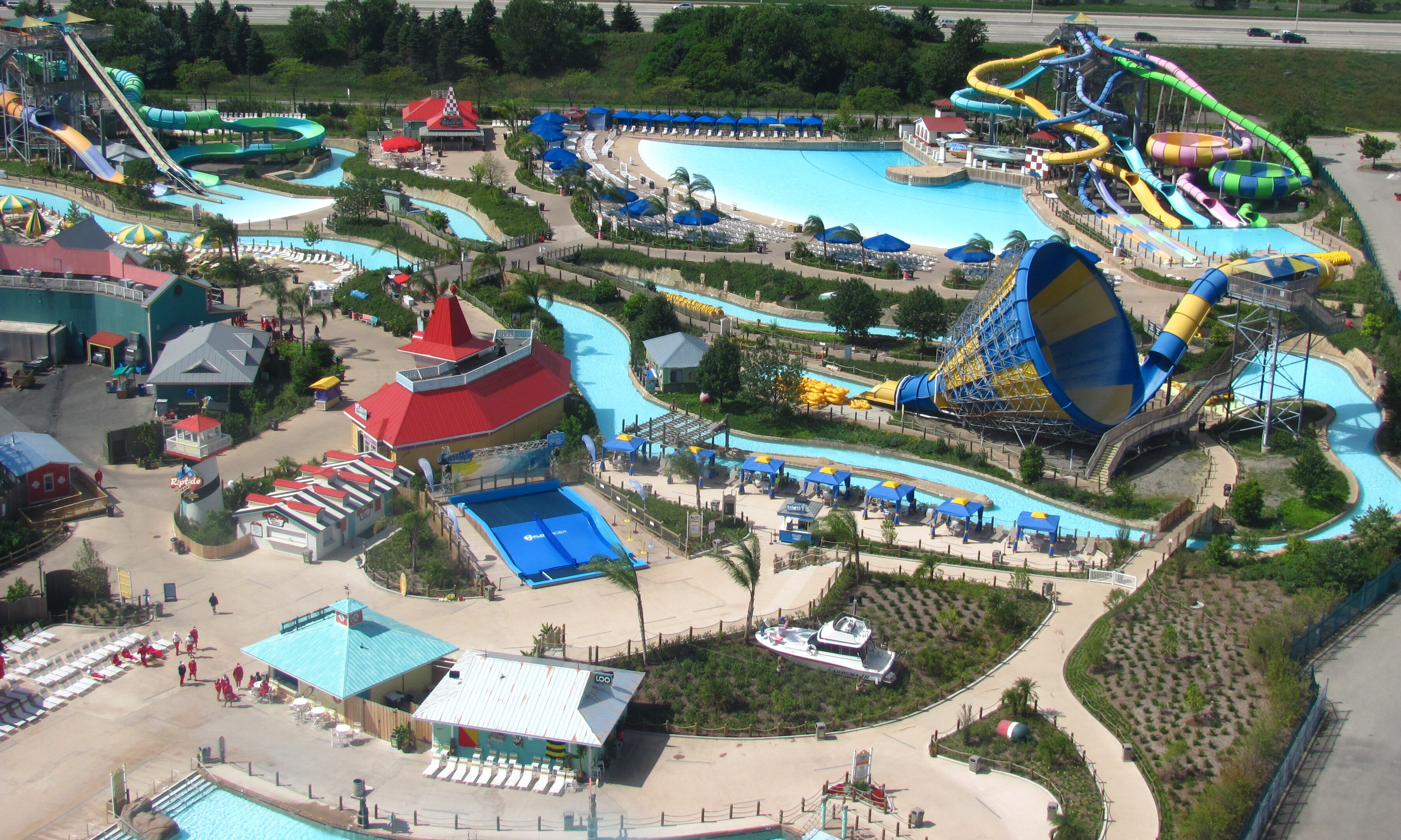
- An aerial view of the water park in 2011
- Interactive map of Six Flags Hurricane Harbor Chicago
- Location: Six Flags Great America, Gurnee, Illinois, United States
- Coordinates: 42°22′06″N 87°56′19″W
- Theme: Caribbean island
- Owner: Six Flags
- Park president: John Krajnak
- Opened: May 28, 2005; 21 years ago
- Previous names: Six Flags Hurricane Harbor (2005–2021)
- Operating season: May to September
- Status: Operating
- Area: 20 acres (8.1 ha)
- Pools: 2 pools
- Water slides: 25 water slides
- Website: www.sixflags.com/greatamerica/hurricane-harbor

Six Flags Hurricane Harbor Chicago is a water park in Gurnee, Illinois, United States. It is located adjacent to the Six Flags Great America amusement park. Owned and operated by Six Flags, the water park features 25 water slides and two pools. Since 2021, Hurricane Harbor Chicago has operated as a separate gate from the amusement park.

In 1996, Six Flags started planning a new water park on a separate plot of land from the amusement park, across Interstate 94. These plans evolved into a resort complex named Six Flags Entertainment Village, but were eventually cancelled in 1999 following public opposition. Eventually, Six Flags Hurricane Harbor was announced in 2004, built on the amusement park property. A US$42 million expansion, it opened on May 28, 2005. The water park further expanded in later years by adding the Riptide Bay area in 2011 and Tsunami Surge, marketed as the tallest water coaster in the world at the time of its 2021 opening.

The water park's attractions have been recognized by the Amusement Today magazine and the World Waterpark Association.

== History ==
=== 1996–1999: Early water park proposals ===
Discussions about a Six Flags water park near the Six Flags Great America amusement park began in May 1996, when park representatives met with officials of Gurnee, Illinois, to obtain permission to build a water park. The water park would be located on a separate plot of land owned by Six Flags, located to the west of Six Flags Great America, across Interstate 94. It was planned to open by 1998. A spokesperson for Six Flags Great America later called the plans "extremely premature" and said the park might not proceed. Additionally, constructing the water park would require a special use permit because the land was zoned for office use.

Plans to build a water park later became part of a larger plan called Six Flags Entertainment Village, which was announced on October 29, 1997. The resort complex included the water park plans alongside shopping, a hotel, and convention center. It was planned to be located on the same plot of land that was previously planned for the water park. Construction was planned to begin in 2000 after government officials of Gurnee approved the project in December 1998.

A citizen group called the Citizens United for a Residential Village of Gurnee (CURV) was formed to oppose the resort project due to concerns of overdevelopment, congestion, and rising property values. A referendum about the project's approval was included in an election ballot on April 13, 1999, and later concluded that more than half of Gurnee residents had voted against the project. This derailed the Six Flags Entertainment Village project and was never constructed.

=== 2004–2005: Announcement and opening ===
On September 10, 2004, Gurnee, Illinois, officials confirmed plans that a water park would be built on Six Flags Great America's existing plot. Six Flags Great America officially announced a 13-acre (5.3 ha) Caribbean-themed water park named Six Flags Hurricane Harbor on September 16, 2004, slated to open for the 2005 season. It was expected to compete with other water parks in Wisconsin Dells and the Chicago metropolitan area, and would be considered the largest expansion in Six Flags Great America history. The water park would be built on the former far west side of the parking lot.

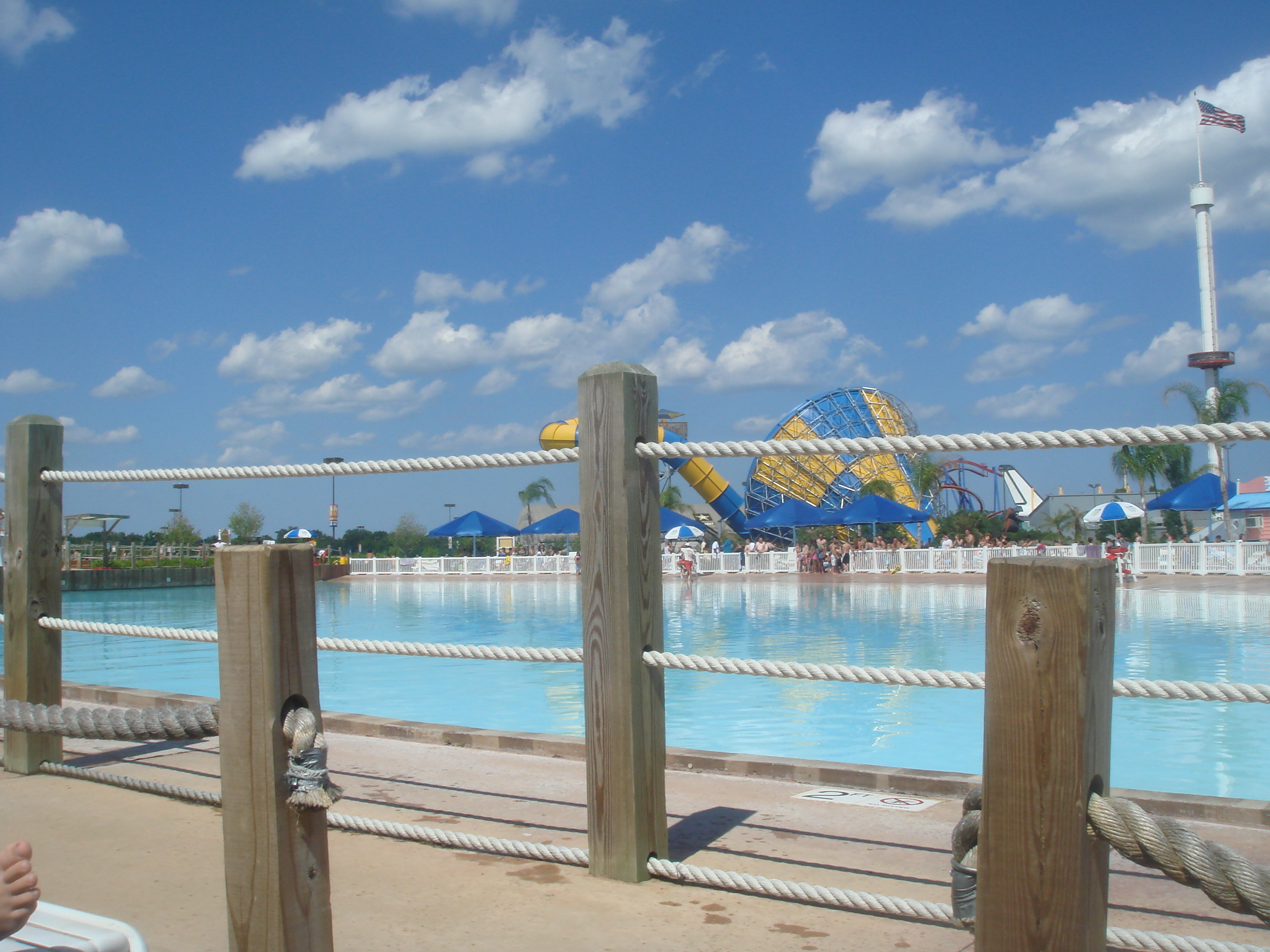
Hurricane Bay, a 500,000 gallon wave pool, pictured in 2008.

The water park was planned to open with 25 water slides and include an interactive water structure named Skull Island, which would feature 500 gadgets and eight water slides, and a 500,000 gallon wave pool. Admission would be included with a regular ticket for the theme park. The water park was expected to generate 700 new jobs.

Construction on the US$42 million water park began in November 2004, lasting seven months. The water park opened to the public on May 28, 2005. Almost a month following the opening of Hurricane Harbor, a man had a heart attack in the Hurricane Bay wave pool and died on June 22, 2005. During the water park's first year of operation, it was reported 1.3 million people had visited, which park officials regarded as a "huge success".

=== 2006–2018: Tornado and Riptide Bay expansions ===
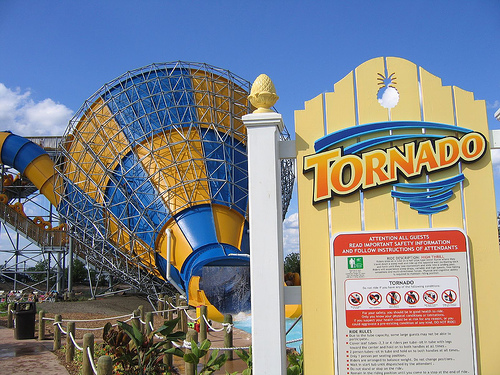
Tornado in 2006

Following the initial opening of Six Flags Hurricane Harbor, a funnel water slide named Tornado was announced on January 14, 2006, at the American Coaster Enthusiasts "No Coaster Con" convention. It would open later in 2006 and be located above the Castaway Creek lazy river. The ride opened on Memorial Day weekend in 2006.

For the 2011 season, a new Bolliger & Mabillard roller coaster was planned for the adjacent Six Flags Great America amusement park, speculated to be a relocation of the roller coaster Chang from Six Flags Kentucky Kingdom. It would stand on the former site of Space Shuttle America. After receiving a recommendation of approval from the Gurnee zoning board, the park backed out of the expansion.

Instead of the roller coaster, the park opted to build the four-acre (1.6 ha) Riptide Bay area, which opened on June 3, 2011. Riptide Bay initially included a surf simulator named Surf Rider, the Mega Wedgie vertical twin drop launch capsule slides, the Dive Bomber loop twin drop launch capsule slides, the Wipeout funnel raft slide, a Caribbean-inspired activity pool named Monsoon Lagoon, and cabanas.

In July 2011, a woman suffered injuries on the Wahoo Racer racing water slide and sued the park for negligently operating the attraction. A court upheld an award of US$1.5 million USD in June 2017.

=== 2019–present: Tsunami Surge and operations as a separate park ===
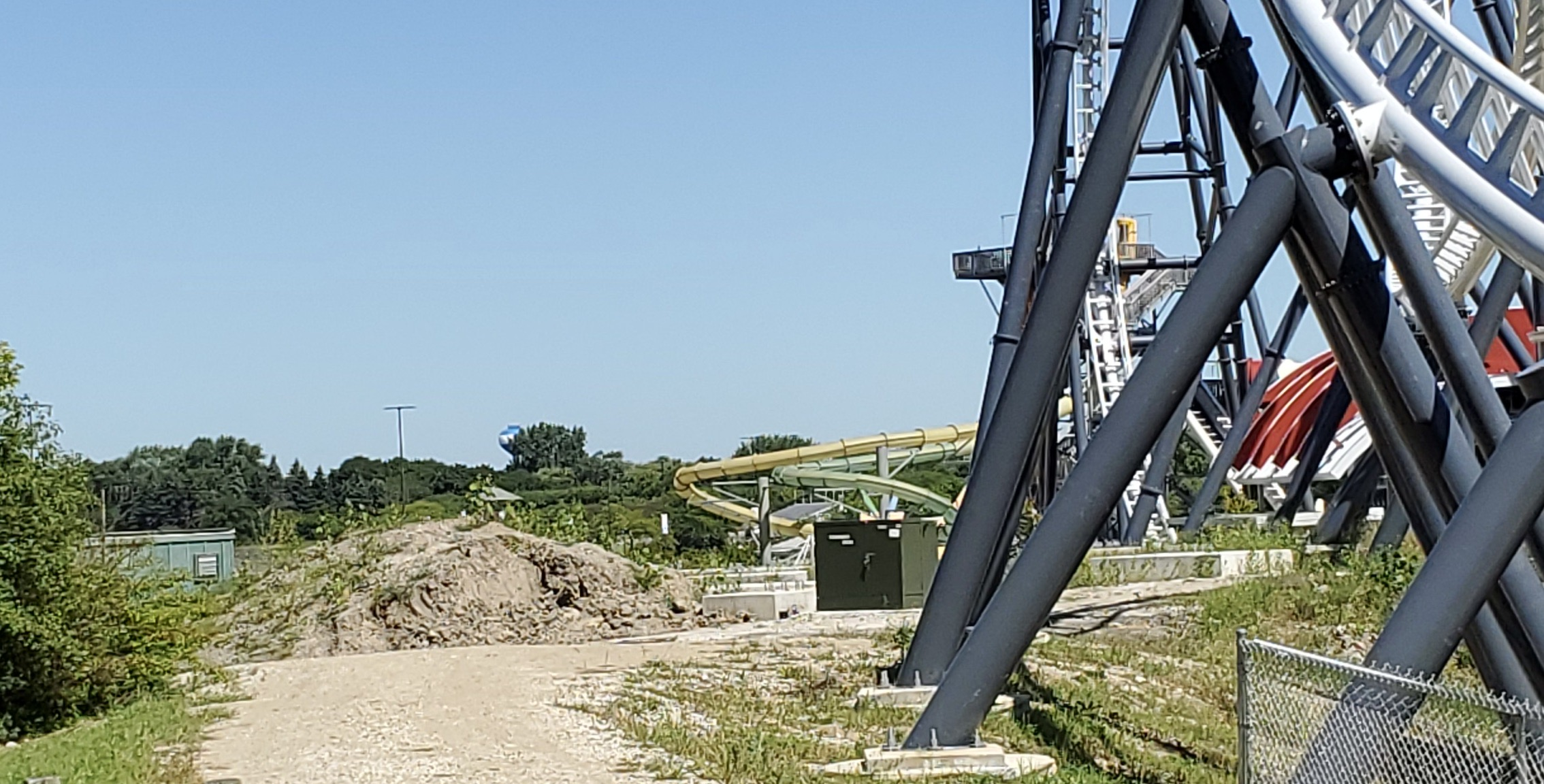
Footers for Tsunami Surge during construction in July 2020

On August 29, 2019, Six Flags Hurricane Harbor announced a new water coaster named Tsunami Surge manufactured by WhiteWater West. It would be the tallest water coaster in the world at 86 feet (26 m) tall, and was expected to open for the 2020 season. Groundbreaking for the ride began in January 2020, but the ride did not open due to the water park's closure and construction delays as a result of the COVID-19 pandemic.

While Six Flags Great America was closed for the 2020 season, Six Flags Hurricane Harbor re-opened with safety protocols regarding COVID-19 in place. Beginning in this period, the water park was referred to as Six Flags Hurricane Harbor Chicago.

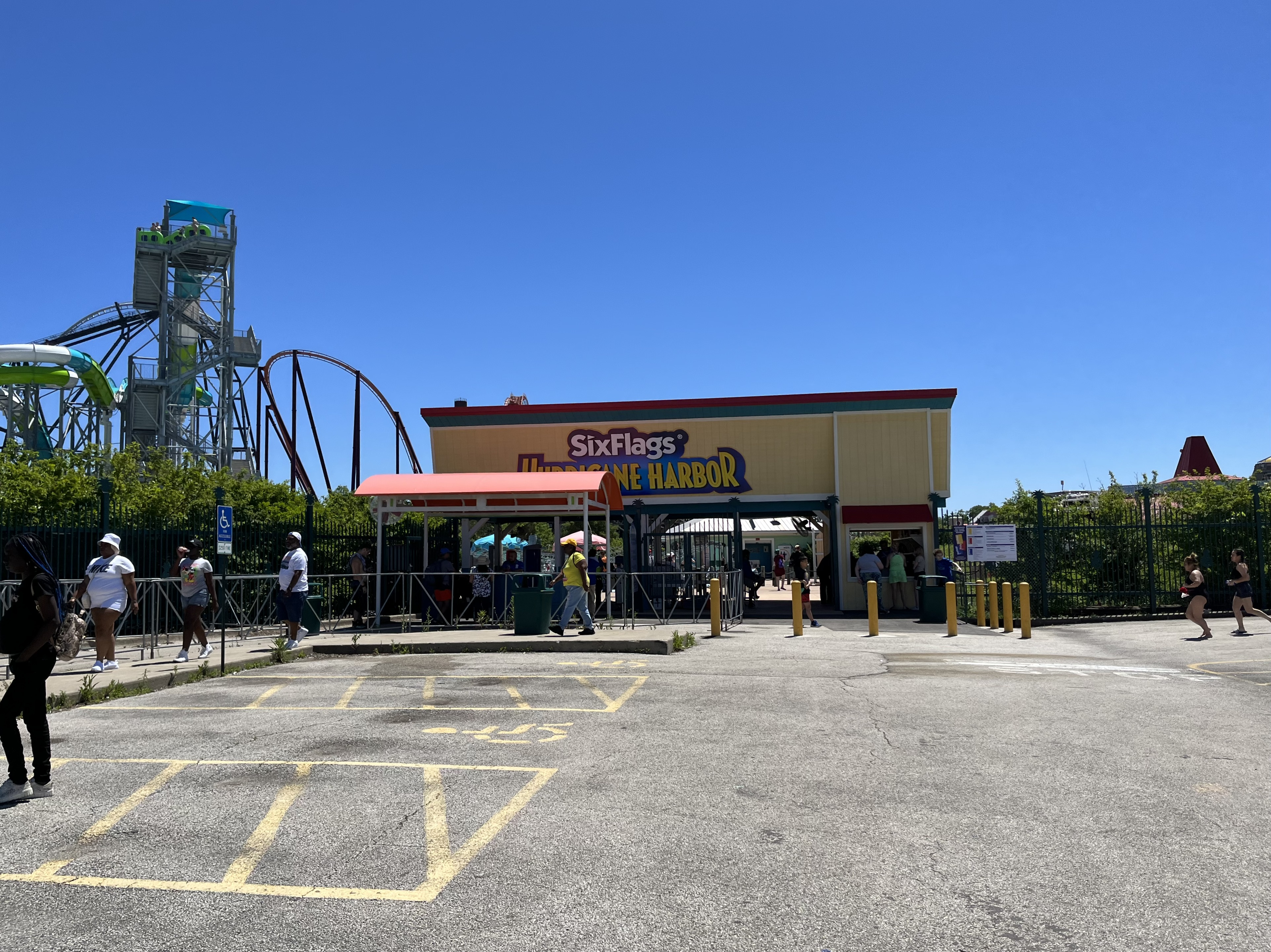
The front gate for Hurricane Harbor Chicago, seen in 2022.

On March 22, 2021, the water park became separate admission and was officially renamed Six Flags Hurricane Harbor Chicago. As a result, the water park's entrance via the theme park was no longer accessible, and all guests would enter through a new, separate entrance gate. Park officials said that the change was made to allow guests to choose to enter the theme park or the water park.

On May 29, 2021, Tsunami Surge officially opened to the public as the tallest water coaster in the world. In 2024, both the Mega Wedgie and Dive Bomber drop launch capsule water slides in the Riptide Bay area were closed and were removed in 2025, before the park opened for the season. The park has indicated that its plots will be used for future expansion.

== List of attractions ==
Thrill level (out of 5)
1 (low) 2 (mild) 3 (moderate) 4 (high) 5 (aggressive)

Name	Opened	Manufacturer	Type	Thrill level	Ref.
Castaway Creek	May 28, 2005	Aquatic Development	Lazy river	1	
Bahama Mama and Bubba Tubba	May 28, 2005	ProSlide	Two family rafting slides	5	
Hammerhead and Barracuda	May 28, 2005	ProSlide	Dual slide complex	4	
Hurricane Bay	May 28, 2005	Aquatic Development	Wave pool	2	
Hurricane Mountain	May 28, 2005	ProSlide	Water slide complex	4	
Paradise Plunge and Riptide	May 28, 2005	ProSlide	Speed slide	4	
Skull Island and Buccaneer Bay	May 28, 2005	ProSlide	Interactive playground	3	
Vortex and Typhoon	May 28, 2005	ProSlide	Twin bowl slides	5	
Wahoo Racer	May 28, 2005	ProSlide Technology	Multi-lane racer	5	
Tornado	May 29, 2006	ProSlide	Funnel slide	5	
Riptide Bay
Monsoon Lagoon	June 3, 2011	—N/a	Swimming pool	1	
Surf Rider	June 3, 2011	Wave Loch	Surf simulator	5	
Wipeout	June 3, 2011	ProSlide	Double funnel slide	5	
Tsunami Surge	May 29, 2021	WhiteWater West	Water coaster	5	

=== Former attractions ===
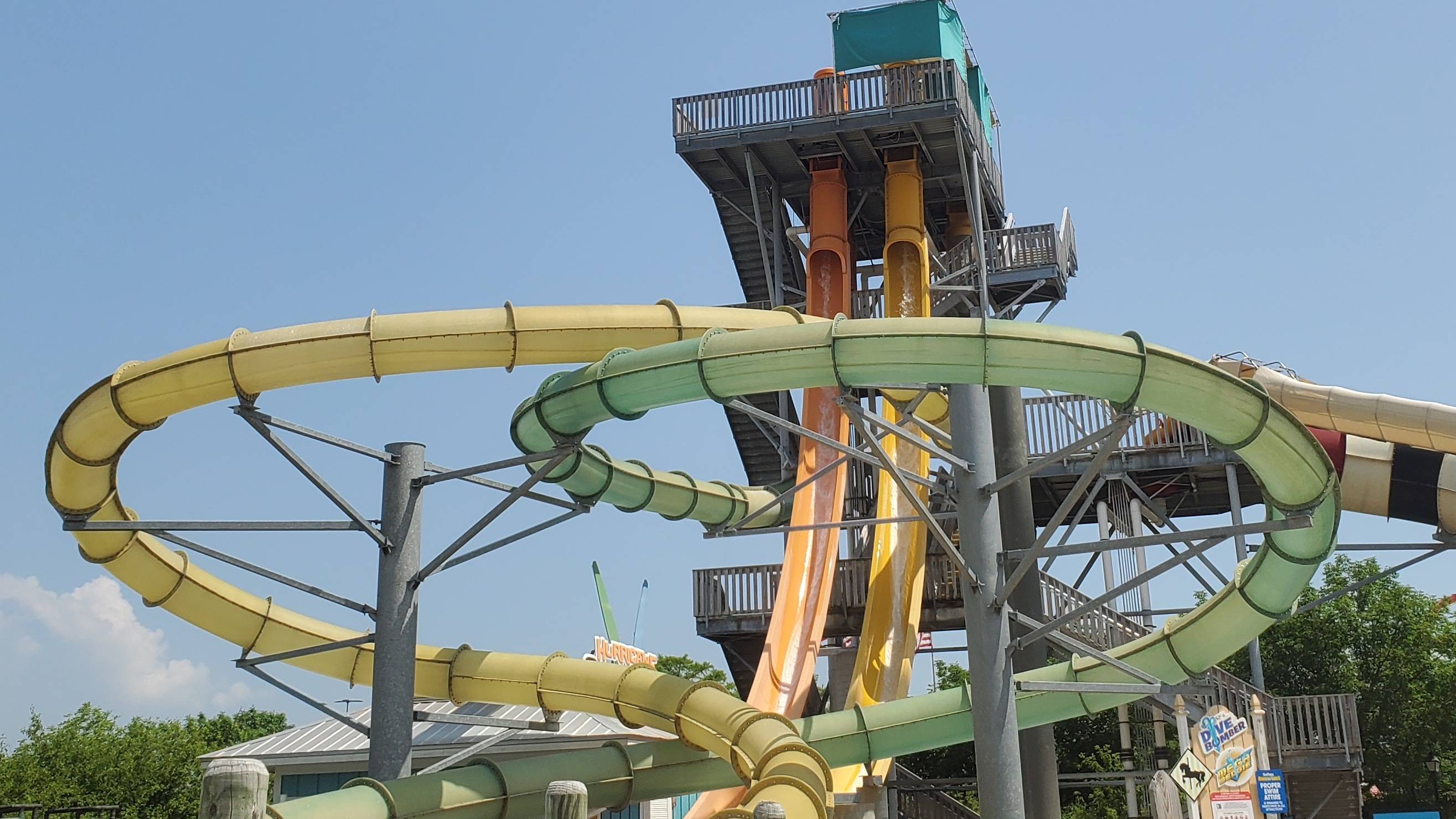
Dive Bomber and Mega Wedgie are the only two slides that have been removed from Hurricane Harbor Chicago.

Name	Opened	Removed	Manufacturer	Type	Ref.
Dive Bomber	June 3, 2011	2025	ProSlide	Drop-launch capsule	
Mega Wedgie	June 3, 2011	2025	ProSlide	Drop-launch capsule	

== Awards ==
In 2006, the water slide Tornado placed second for the category "Best New Water Slide," in Amusement Today’s Golden Ticket Awards. It was tied with Time Warp, located at Noah's Ark Water Park in Wisconsin Dells, Wisconsin.

In August 2021, the water park, manufacturer WhiteWater West, and architecture firm Ramaker won the 2021 Leading Edge Award from the World Waterpark Association for their work on Tsunami Surge. Tsunami Surge placed third place in the category "Best New Water Slide" in Amusement Today's 2021 Golden Ticket Awards.

== See also ==
- Incidents at Six Flags parks
- Six Flags Hurricane Harbor, a chain of water parks operated by Six Flags
- Six Flags Hurricane Harbor Rockford, a Six Flags water park in Rockford, Illinois
