= Schlitterbahn =

American brand of water parks and resorts owned by Six Flags

Coordinates: 29.71336°N 98.12505°W

- Product type: Water park
- Current owner: Six Flags
- Country: United States
- Introduced: 1979
- Related brands: Hurricane Harbor; Soak City
- Markets: Texas
- Previous owners: The Henry family
- Website: Official website

Schlitterbahn is an American brand of Texas-based water parks and resorts owned by Six Flags Entertainment Corporation. The brand consists of one park in New Braunfels, Texas. It was originally a company family owned and operated by the Henry family, founded in 1979, before selling the brand to Cedar Fair in 2019; Cedar Fair merged with Six Flags in 2024. At its peak, the company consisted of five outdoor waterparks, two indoor waterparks, and three resorts.

Schlitterbahn's outdoor water parks are seasonally operated, typically open from late April through mid-September, while its indoor locations operate year-round. The New Braunfels location is owned and operated by Six Flags, while the Galveston location is owned by EPR Properties and operated by Enchanted Parks. Although the Galveston park was sold by Six Flags, the park retains the Schlitterbahn brand for the rest of the 2026 season.

== New Braunfels, Texas location ==
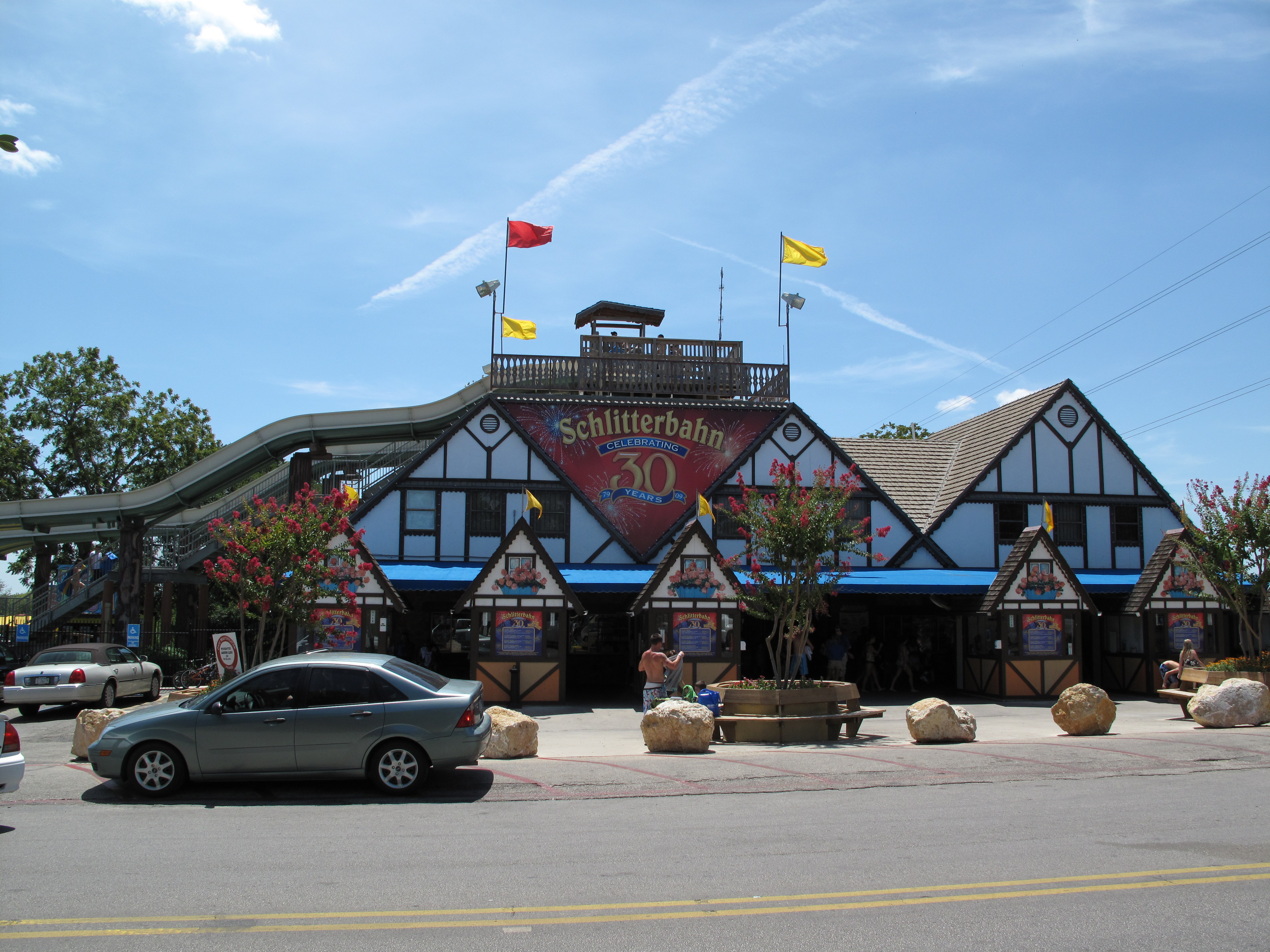
Entrance to Schlitterbahn in New Braunfels, Texas

The first of the parks was in New Braunfels and opened in 1979. The park was named Schlitterbahn ("slippery road" in German) because of the local area's German heritage. It originally consisted of four waterslides. The park expanded three times. Surfenberg was the first part of the expansion and had the world's first inland surfing ride, the Boogie Bahn, in 1992, created the first uphill water coaster, the Dragon Blaster in 1994. In 1996 the next section opened - Blastenhoff - and featured the world's first wave river, the Torrent, and the world's most award-winning uphill water coaster, the Master Blaster. In 2011, the park expanded again, adding The Falls, the world's longest tubing river, featuring rapids and tube chutes.

As of 2022, the park has won Amusement Today's Golden Ticket Award for Best Waterpark for 24 years straight; the streak began with the inception of the award. In total, Schlitterbahn New Braunfels has received 42 Golden Ticket Awards. As of 2014, the park employed 2,000 seasonal workers.

== Former locations ==
=== Galveston, Texas ===
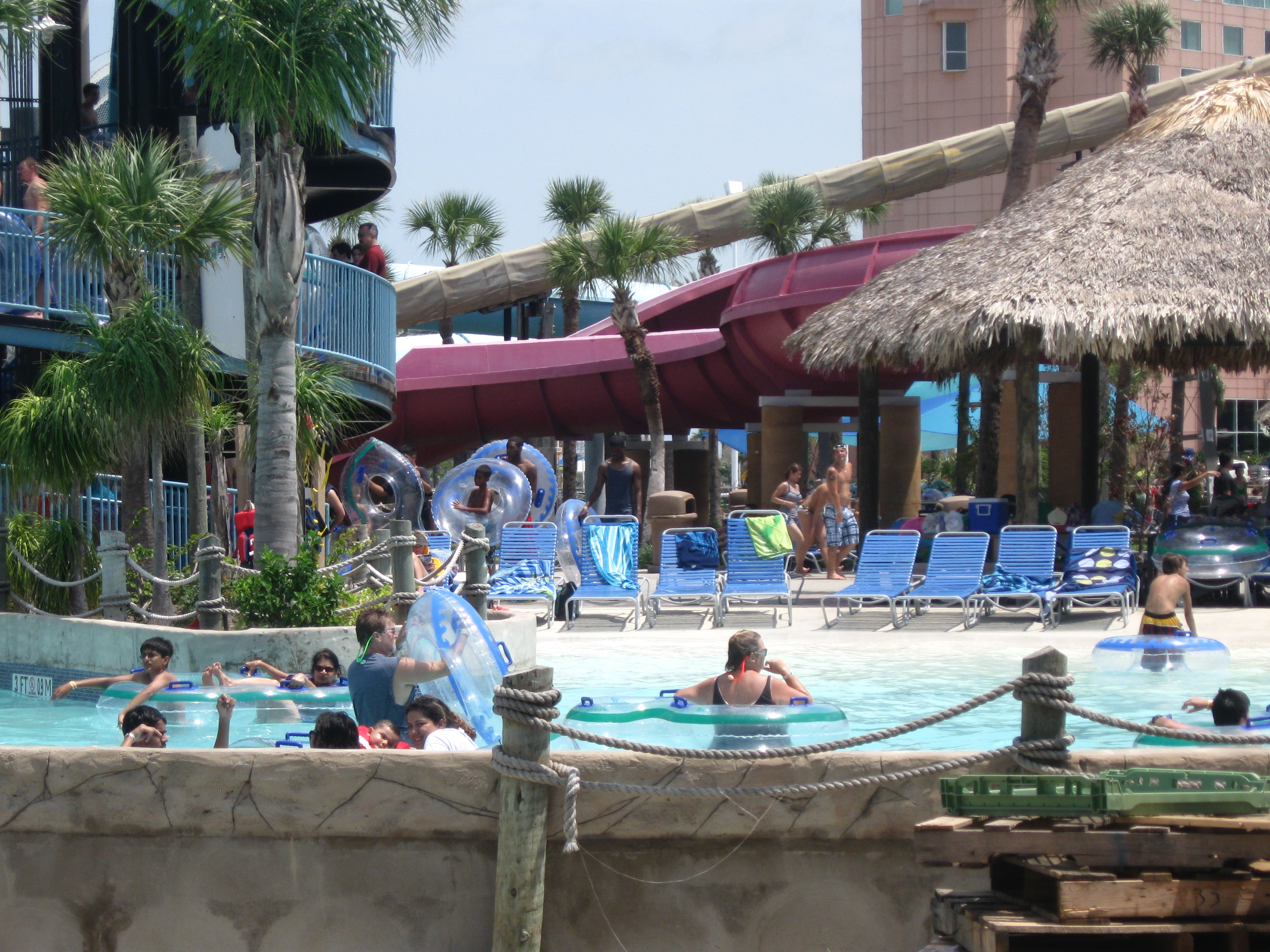
Schlitterbahn in Galveston, Texas

The 26-acre Schlitterbahn park in Galveston opened in 2006. The park features the most thrill rides of any of the Schlitterbahn parks and is home to the world's former record holder of the world's tallest water coaster, MASSIV, as it lost its record to Tsunami Surge at Hurricane Harbor Chicago at 86 feet tall. MASSIV opened in 2016 and features the most current technology including water and power saving features never used before. Although it had lost its record for the tallest water coaster, MASSIV still holds the Guinness Book of World Records title for the Tallest Water Coaster and is 81 feet 6 inches (24.84 m) tall.

On March 5, 2026, Six Flags, owner of Schlitterbahn Galveston, announced it would sell it to EPR Properties alongside six other theme parks, with Enchanted Parks operating the park. The sale completed on April 6, 2026. The water park dropped the Schlitterbahn branding on November 12, 2026, renaming to Texas Tides Water Park.

=== South Padre Island, Texas ===
The park in South Padre Island opened in 2001. An indoor section opened in 2012. The park featured Transportainment - a system where guests can ride through the majority of the park's attractions while floating in their tubes. In fact, this park had floating queue lines for three of the four uphill water coasters. When the Henrys sold the company to Cedar Fair, they retained the ownership of this property and rebranded it. The park was rebranded as Beach Park at Isla Blanca in December 2019.

=== Corpus Christi, Texas ===
In May 2012, Schlitterbahn announced that it would move forward with plans to begin construction of a new water park in the Corpus Christi-Padre Island area. It was announced that it would open during the summer of 2013, but due to various delays, groundbreaking didn't take place until February 2013. A 574-acre (232 ha) plan for the city included a marina, the Schlitterbahn water park with lodging, and a golf course. Vendors complained, and then sued Schlitterbahn over $500,000 in unpaid bills on the Corpus Christi project. After several months, Schlitterbahn paid the vendors and threw them a party. Schlitterbahn Corpus Christi opened on June 20, 2015, with a full-service restaurant, the Veranda, two kids' areas, the Krystal river system, the Sky Blaster, and the Aquaveyer. In 2016 the southern end of the park opened along with a resort. Christened Schlitterbahn Riverpark - Corpus Christi, the park featured nearly two miles (3.2 km) of river and multiple blasters. In 2017, Padre's Plunge, a SkyTrans Manufacturing Shoot the Chute, opened in the southern end of the park. It had previously operated as "Buzzsaw Falls" at Alabama Splash Adventure. This park featured four types of rivers, two children's areas, a massive swim-up bar, a stage for concerts, a resort with several event spaces, and a full-service restaurant.

On May 1, 2018, IBC Bank took over ownership of the park at foreclosure auction. Schlitterbahn continued to operate it while a new owner was sought. The property was rebranded as Waves Resort Corpus Christi. After not operating during 2020 due to the COVID-19 pandemic, the park was closed. In 2021, the park was demolished.

=== Kansas City, Kansas ===
The first phase of the park opened in July 2009. The park opened each year in May. After a fatal accident in 2016, Cedar Fair elected not to purchase the property along with the other Schlitterbahn parks. The park did not open in the 2019 season and was razed in 2021.

== Proposed projects ==
=== Fort Lauderdale, Florida ===
A long-stalled project in Fort Lauderdale, Florida, Schlitterbahn received final approval from the Federal Aviation Administration to construct a 64-acre water park at the old Fort Lauderdale Stadium. The initial project would have used portions of the old stadium to construct a castle-like entrance to include lodging, dining and shopping facilities. Other projects included incorporating the neighboring Lockhart Stadium into the plan by expanding the park around that stadium.

A lawsuit between Fort Lauderdale and nearby Rapids Water Park delayed the project. On March 29, 2017, federal U.S. District Judge Jose Martinez ruled against the City of Fort Lauderdale in the case stating they "did not follow their own charter" in awarding the property lease to Schlitterbahn without conducting a competitive bid process and declared the lease "invalid, null and void."

Premier Parks, LLC eventually won the bid for the project with plans to build a Wet'n'Wild brand water park on the site. However, in September 2018, the CEO of Premier, Kieran Burke, cancelled the deal.

=== Cedar Park, Texas ===
While the Henry Family owned and operated the chain, there were plans for a waterpark in Cedar Park, Texas.

== Incidents ==
- On March 6, 2013, Nicolas "Nico" Benavidez, a 20-year-old seasonal employee at Schlitterbahn South Padre Island, was fatally injured and a maintenance supervisor seriously injured when a wave generation machine they were inside for maintenance was activated, crushing them between the gate of the machine and the wall. Benavidez was left on life support for organ donation and later died from the injuries on March 11. OSHA investigated and fined Schlitterbahn $96,000 for six safety violations related to the fatal incident.
- In June and July 2013, Schlitterbahn New Braunfels employed Devin Patrick Kelley, the future perpetrator of the 2017 Sutherland Springs church shooting. Kelley was employed as a nighttime security guard for five and a half weeks before his contract was terminated. Schlitterbahn spokeswoman Winter Prosapio stated after the shooting that Kelley was unarmed during his employment and had passed background checks, as records were never forwarded to the National Crime Information Center regarding his conviction on two counts of domestic violence and a pending court martial in the United States Air Force.
- On August 7, 2016, 10-year-old Caleb Thomas Schwab, son of Kansas representative Scott Schwab, was decapitated while riding the Verrückt, a water raft ride touted as the world's tallest water slide. He died before reaching the bottom. Two other unrelated riders in the same raft sustained injuries. The ride was decommissioned and later demolished. The park settled with all parties in 2016, with the Schwab family receiving nearly $20 million. In March 2018, a Wyandotte County grand jury filed indictments against the park and three employees, including the co-owner, Verrückt's designer and a former park executive. The indictment accused the park and its employees of negligence, as well as concealing design flaws and other issues with the ride. On February 22, 2019, all charges were dropped by Judge Robert Burns against the construction company and Schlitterbahn owners due to prosecutorial misconduct.
