= Enchanted Parks =

American amusement park operator formed in 2025

Enchanted Parks LLC
- Logo used since October 2026
- Formerly: Enchanted Parks Holdings, LLC. (2025–2026)
- Type: Private
- Industry: Amusement parks
- Predecessor: Innovative Attractions Management
- Founded: December 18, 2025; 10 months ago
- Founder: James Harhi
- Headquarters: Windermere, Florida, U.S.
- Number of locations: 8 (2026)
- Area served: United States
- Key people: James Harhi (CEO); Franceen Gonzales (COO)
- Website: enchantedparks.com

Enchanted Parks LLC is an American amusement park company headquartered in Windermere, Florida. The company operates eight properties in the United States, including amusement parks, water parks, and family entertainment centers, with on-site resorts. Founded by James Harhi in 2012 as Innovative Attractions Management, the company originally focused on developing and managing tourist attractions. After acquiring Enchanted Forest Water Safari in 2024 and Diggerland USA in 2025, Enchanted Parks was formed as a spin-off company of Innovative Attractions Management. In 2026, EPR Properties acquired six former Six Flags parks, selecting Enchanted Parks to operate the parks under long-term leases.

== History ==
=== Innovative Attractions Management ===
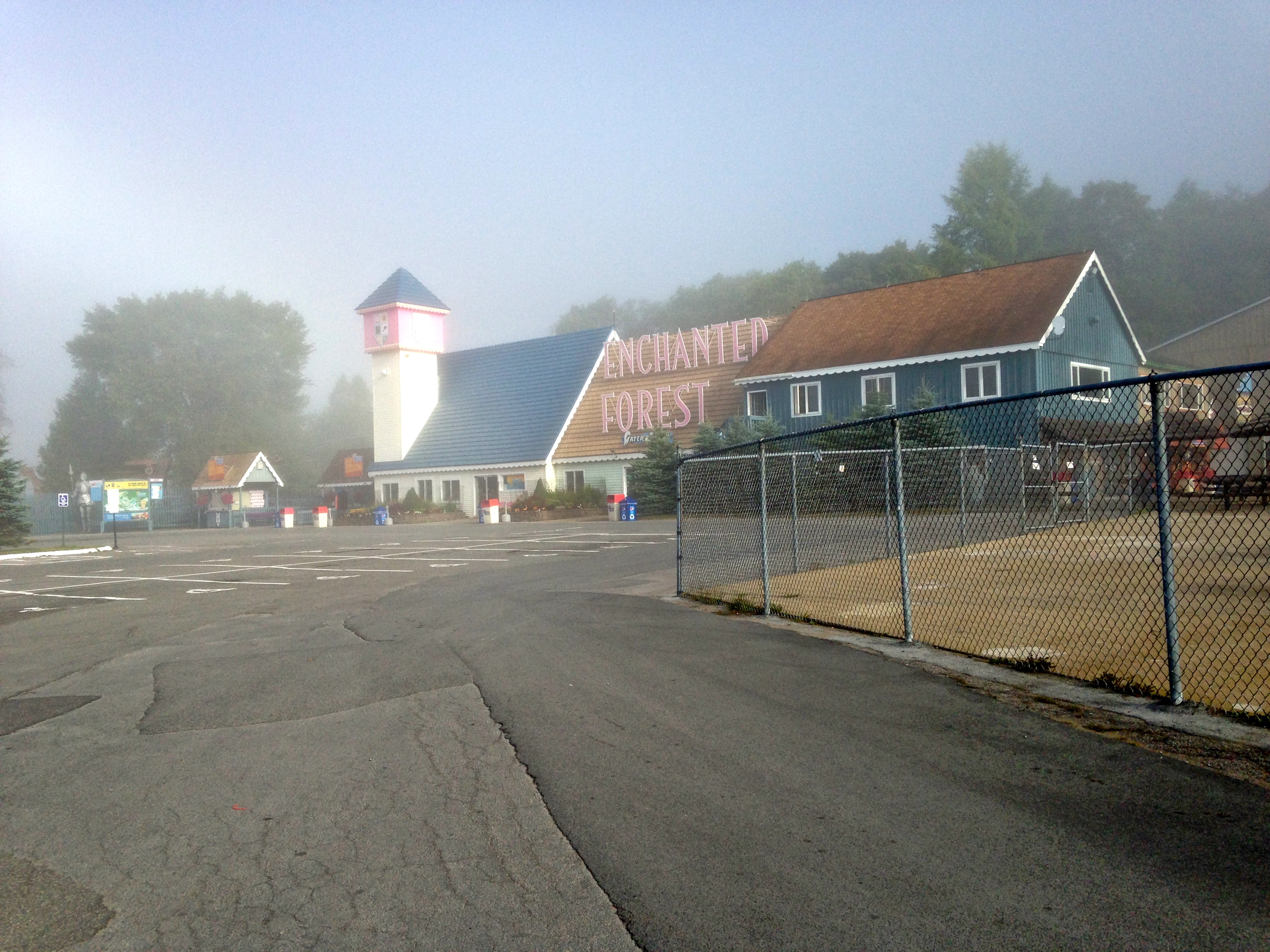
Innovative Attractions Management acquired its first park, Enchanted Forest Water Safari, in 2024.

Innovative Attractions Management (IAM) was a hospitality company formed in 2012 in Windermere, Florida. The company primarily focused on development, operating, and marketing tourist attractions. The Daytona Lagoon water park was its first management client. IAM began acquiring attraction properties in the years leading up to its rebranding to Enchanted Parks. On March 1, 2024, IAM acquired the independent park Enchanted Forest Water Safari from the Noonan family. In January 2025, IAM acquired the United States location of Diggerland in West Berlin, New Jersey from the Girlya Family.

=== Operations as Enchanted Parks ===
On December 18, 2025, the Delaware Division of Corporations reported that a company named Enchanted Parks Holdings, LLC, was formed.

Between January 8 and 9, 2026, Enchanted Parks filed multiple trademarks with the United States Patent and Trademark Office. These trademarks included the names of parks owned by American amusement park operator Six Flags Entertainment Corporation, including Six Flags St. Louis, Michigan's Adventure, Oceans of Fun, and Six Flags Great Escape Lodge. This led to speculation that these parks would be sold. During a February 2026 earnings call, Six Flags CEO John Reilly commented: "We don't have anything to share today on that front" when asked about the trademarks.

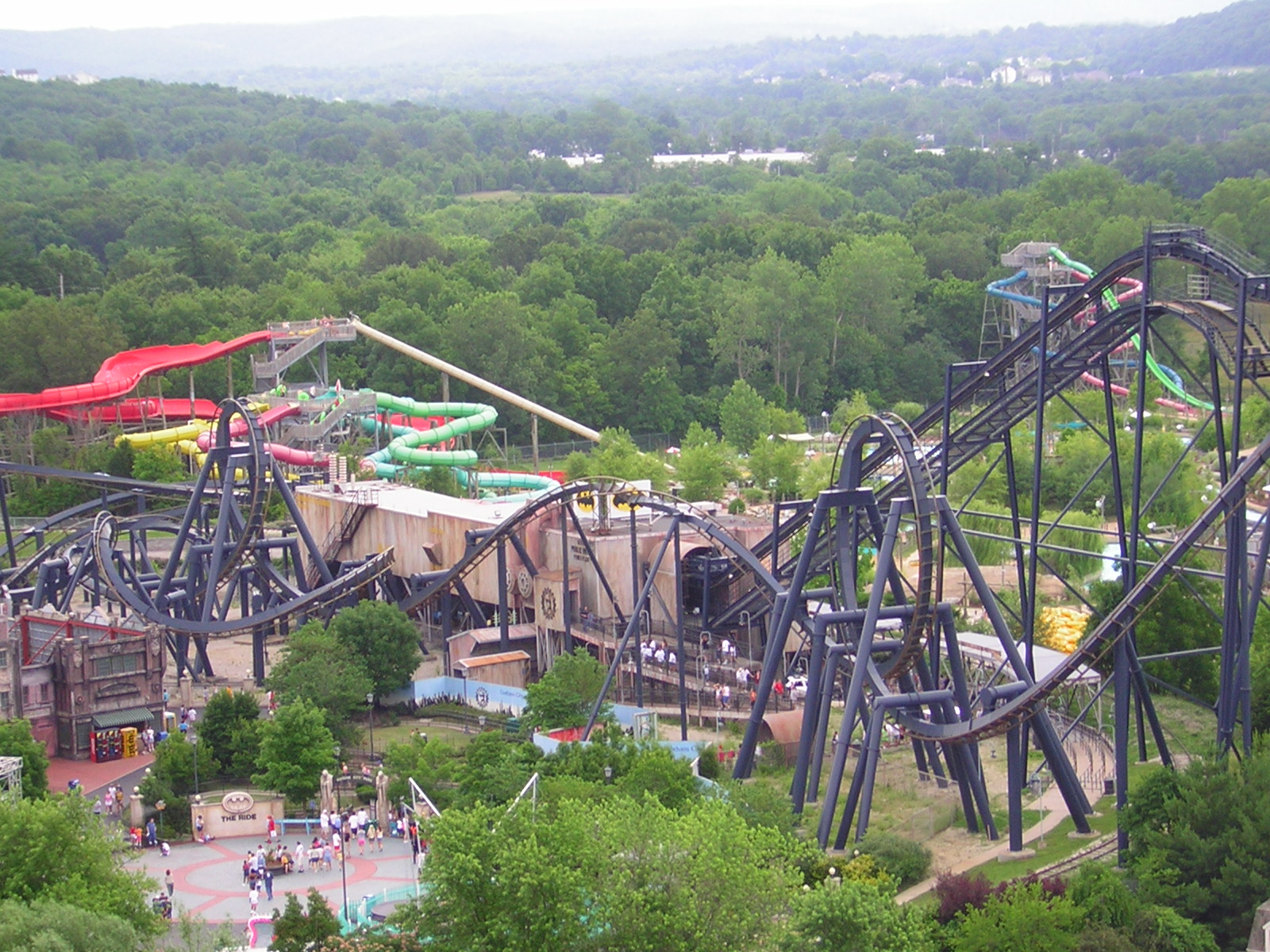
Mid America Adventure (formerly Six Flags St. Louis) has been described as a "crown-jewel" of the March 2026 deal by Enchanted Parks founder and CEO James Harhi. The park is the most-attended Enchanted Parks property.

On March 5, 2026, Six Flags announced the divestiture of seven of its park properties to EPR Properties. Following the sale's completion, all six of the United States-based parks would be operated on a 40-year lease by Enchanted Parks, the theme park operator spin-off of Innovation Attractions Management. The six parks were Michigan's Adventure, Schlitterbahn Galveston, Six Flags Great Escape, Six Flags St. Louis, Valleyfair, and Worlds of Fun. The sale was finalized on April 6, 2026, after which Enchanted Parks became the operator of the six parks.

On March 11, 2026, Enchanted Parks announced it selected the Vantage system by WhiteWater West for point of sale and mobile app services. These services would go live by the opening day of each park. Throughout the 2026 season, Enchanted Parks rebranded its newly acquired parks that had Six Flags branding, which included renaming Six Flags St. Louis to Mid America Adventure in August 2026; Six Flags Great Escape to simply Great Escape in October 2026; and Schlitterbahn Galveston to Texas Tides Water Park in November 2026.

== Properties ==
As of April 6, 2026, Enchanted Parks operates eight properties.

=== Parks ===
Name	Location	Year opened	Year acquired	Notes
Enchanted Forest Water Safari	Old Forge, New York	1956	2024	Owned by EPR Properties; operated by Enchanted Parks. Acquired from the Noonan family. Includes the Calypso's Cove family entertainment center.
Diggerland USA	West Berlin, New Jersey	2014	2025	Owned by EPR Properties; operated by Enchanted Parks. Acquired in January 2025.
Great Escape	Queensbury, New York	1954	2026	Formerly known as Six Flags Great Escape. Acquired from Six Flags, under a 40-year operating lease from EPR Properties. Includes the Hurricane Harbor water park.
Michigan's Adventure	Muskegon, Michigan	1956	2026	Acquired from Six Flags, under a 40-year operating lease from EPR Properties. Includes the WildWater Adventure water park.
Mid America Adventure	Eureka, Missouri	1971	2026	Formerly known as Six Flags St. Louis. Acquired from Six Flags, under a 40-year operating lease from EPR Properties. Includes the Hurricane Harbor St. Louis water park.
Texas Tides Water Park	Galveston, Texas	2006	2026	Formerly known as Schlitterbahn Galveston. Acquired from Six Flags, under a 40-year operating lease from EPR Properties.
Valleyfair	Shakopee, Minnesota	1976	2026	Acquired from Six Flags, under a 40-year operating lease from EPR Properties. Includes the Superior Shores water park.
Worlds of Fun	Kansas City, Missouri	1973	2026	Acquired from Six Flags, under a 40-year operating lease from EPR Properties. Includes the Oceans of Fun water park.

=== Lodging ===
Name	Location	Year acquired	Associated park	Notes
Old Forge Camping Resort	Old Forge, New York	2024	Enchanted Forest Water Safari	Owned by EPR Properties; operated by Enchanted Parks. Acquired from the Noonan family.
Water Edge's Inn	Old Forge, New York	2024	Enchanted Forest Water Safari	Owned by EPR Properties; operated by Enchanted Parks. Acquired from the Noonan family.
Great Escape Lodge	Queensbury, New York	2026	Great Escape	Acquired from Six Flags, under 40-year operating lease from EPR Properties. Includes the White Water Bay water park.
Worlds of Fun Village	Kansas City, Missouri	2026	Worlds of Fun	Acquired from Six Flags, under 40-year operating lease from EPR Properties.

Interactive map of all Enchanted Parks properties.
Amusement parks
Standalone water parks

== Leadership ==
As of August 23, 2026, the executive team of Enchanted Parks consists of:

- James Harhi — chief executive officer, founder
- Franceen Gonzales — chief operating officer
- Lori Franco — chief financial officer
- Michael Fijas — vice president
- Julie Chan — chief people officer
- Una de Boer — chief marketing officer
- Katie Wojdyla — vice president of marketing
- Cathy Dunlap — vice president of lodging
- Jess Lawler — corporate director of social media and communications

== See also ==
- List of incidents at Enchanted Parks properties
