= List of incidents at Enchanted Parks properties =

This is a summary of notable incidents at the amusement parks and water parks that are operated by Enchanted Parks. In some cases, these incidents occurred while the park was under different management or ownership, such as former Six Flags parks.

This list is not intended to be a comprehensive list of every such event, but only those that have a significant impact on the parks or park operations, or are otherwise significantly noteworthy. The term incidents refers to major accidents, injuries, or deaths that occur at a park. While these incidents were required to be reported to regulatory authorities due to where they occurred, they usually fall into one of the following categories:

1. Caused by negligence on the part of the guest. This can be a refusal to follow specific ride safety instructions, or deliberate intent to violate park rules.
2. The result of a guest's known, or unknown, health issues.
3. Negligence on the part of the park, either by ride operator or maintenance safety instructions, or deliberate intent to violate park rules.
4. Natural disaster or a generic accident (e.g., lightning strike, slipping and falling), that is not a direct result of an action on anybody's part.

== Enchanted Forest Water Safari ==
- On September 14, 2013, a pair of volunteer fire fighters from the Sodus Point Volunteer Fire Department were arrested for breaking into the park off-season, stealing food, damaging arcade games, and an animated band, as well as defecating on the floor.
- On July 29, 2017, police received a report of a couple having sex in their pickup truck in the parking lot of Water Safari. When police arrived, 29-year-old Kristin Rogers attempted to flee the parking lot and assaulted an officer on apprehension; a 30-year-old male was apprehended without incident. Both were ticketed with public lewdness, while Rogers was additionally charged for resisting arrest, harassment, and disorderly conduct.
- On July 18, 2021, a 23-year-old female suffered a fatal asthma attack leading to cardiac arrest after climbing an incline and riding a water slide.

== Great Escape ==
=== Sky Ride ===
- On June 23, 2017, a 14-year-old girl from Greenwood, Delaware, fell approximately 25 feet (8 m) from her gondola. The girl had slipped under the chair's safety bar while the ride was in motion. The ride was stopped when park visitors alerted the operators to the incident, while other visitors gathered underneath the girl to prepare to catch her. She ultimately fell into the group of visitors below her. One of these visitors, an unidentified 47-year-old man, injured his back in the process. The passenger received no serious injuries and was taken to Albany Medical Center. Park officials stated that there did not appear to be a malfunction of the ride, but closed the ride pending review. The ride later reopened, with added restraints to prevent any future accidents.

== Michigan's Adventure ==
=== Chaos ===
- On July 30, 2001, the upper rotating portion of the ride separated from the stationary base, leading to a sudden collapse of the passenger ride wheel. The rotation was immediately halted, and several of the passenger cars were severely damaged. 31 of 33 riders were sent to local hospitals with mostly minor injuries. The other two were removed from their vehicle nine hours after the collapse. An investigation blamed maintenance for loose bolts that twisted and broke, as well as structural fatigue fractures discovered afterward.

=== Shivering Timbers ===
- On June 19, 2021, a train with guests was stopped by the ride's computer on the final emergency brakes set on the brake run after slipping past the first set due to persistent rain. Maintenance arrived shortly on the scene and deactivated the E-Stop. This caused the emergency brakes to disengage and released the stopped train, thus colliding with the second empty train in the station. The collision was not at high speed, and none of the guests faced severe injuries. The ride was closed afterward for two weeks to repair and reinforce the damaged track caused by the collision. The ride was later reopened on July 3, 2021, with only one train in operation. The ride has since gone back to having two trains in operation for the 2022 season.

=== Thunderhawk ===
- On May 29, 2017, Thunderhawk's emergency safety mechanism shut down the ride for 90 minutes after a lift motor malfunctioned. One train was in the station, while another was moving on the track.

=== WildWater Adventure ===
- On July 11, 2014, a cloud of chlorine gas spread in the wave pool at WildWater Adventure, exposing more than 50 guests in the area. 28 of them were taken to a local hospital for treatment, while the remaining 27 were treated on scene and released.

=== Zach's Zoomer ===
- On June 30, 2000, a 38-year-old woman turning to photograph her relatives in the cars behind her fell out of Zach's Zoomer and was critically injured. As she fell off, she was struck by a wooden support beam. Paramedics found the woman unconscious, and she was transported to Hackley Hospital in critical condition. She suffered rib fractures and other internal injuries.

== Mid America Adventure ==
=== Rail Blazer ===
- On July 7, 1984, a 46-year-old woman from Indianapolis, Indiana, was riding the Rail Blazer roller coaster (now River King Mine Train) when she was flung from the ride and fell 20 feet (6.1 m) to her death. Park officials claimed that the woman fainted and fell out of the car, but her husband, who had been beside her, said that she had not fainted but had simply been tossed from the ride when it whipped around a curve. At the time, the ride was only the third stand-up roller coaster in the world, but following this incident it was converted back to a sit-down coaster.

=== Screamin' Eagle ===
- On September 18, 1976, 19 people suffered minor injuries after the Screamin' Eagle train collided into the other that was parked at the station. Sixteen of them were treated at the park's first aid medical center, while three were taken to the hospital for further examination.

=== Skyway ===
- On July 26, 1978, a man and two of his three nieces who were riding with him died when their gondola fell from the cable. The ride was quickly shut down, leaving nearly 100 people stranded in the 27 remaining cars, some of which had stopped at heights of up to 200 feet (61 m). Firefighters were called to the park to rescue the occupants of those cars. A park spokesman claimed that the car simply "dropped off" its cable.

=== Typhoon Twister ===
- On June 24, 2018, there were two separate incidents on the attraction - one involving 28-year-old Thomas Moore from St. Louis, and the other a woman from Lebanon, Missouri. In both cases, the guests fell out of rafts while riding, and were taken to the hospital due to undisclosed injuries. Park management closed the ride for inspection following the pair of incidents, per standard procedure.

=== Other incidents ===
- On June 18, 2009, a power outage at the park stranded some guests on rides, forcing them to have to wait until they were manually released by park officials. Colossus was the most difficult ride to release riders from, because, with no power, it had to be manually cranked to get the passengers to the ground, which took about 75 minutes.
- On June 13, 2018, a 23-year-old man from Caseyville, Illinois verbally and physically assaulted an employee dressed as Daffy Duck. Alcohol was suspected to be involved. He was soon arrested and charged with assault.

== Valleyfair ==
- On May 29, 2023, a large altercation occurred in the parking lot of Valleyfair. Multiple police departments from the area responded to assist with crowds, and one juvenile was transported to the hospital.

=== Adult Night ===
- On May 25, 2017, numerous fights broke out during Valleyfair's debut of "Adult Night", an event that only admits adults inside the park. The fighting took place mostly in the parking lot area, while a small number occurred inside the park. No serious injuries were reported. At least one guest was arrested and charged with disorderly conduct.

=== The Flume ===
- On June 28, 1994, an 11-year-old girl was injured while attempting to exit the ride. She reportedly became frightened as the boat was about to climb the 45-foot-tall (14 m) lift hill and tried to get off the boat. A second boat pinned her underwater. Park staff performed first aid on the victim before paramedics arrived, and she was taken to a nearby hospital where she was reported to be in critical condition.

=== London Terror ===
- On November 21, 2015, a fire broke out at a storage building being used for a haunt attraction at London Terror. A quarter of the structure was damaged, and the cause of the fire was undetermined. No injuries were reported.

=== Minnesota River Valley Railroad ===
- On June 16, 2011, the ride Minnesota River Valley Railroad derailed near the amphitheater at the front of the park and careened into the south train station platform. Two passenger cars left the tracks and were later placed back on the tracks by park maintenance. No injuries were reported.

=== Power Tower ===
- On July 21, 2017, a 41-year-old ride operator sued Power Tower's manufacturer S&S - Sansei Technologies after he was injured while performing maintenance.

=== Superior Shores ===
- On August 5, 2010, a chlorine leak at Superior Shores (then known as Soak City) sent 26 people to the hospital.

=== ValleySCARE ===
- On September 22, 2018, police were forced to close the ValleySCARE event early after a large number of fights broke out. At least three people involved were cited. Police from multiple surrounding communities assisted with the park's evacuation.

=== Xtreme Swing ===
- On September 3, 2007, a fire began in an electrical junction box. The ride reopened several days following repair, and no injuries were reported.

=== Wild Thing ===
- On May 21, 2006, a mounting bracket in Wild Thing's braking system malfunctioned, damaging the rear axle of the fifth car in one of the trains, which led to the disconnection of the sixth car. It tipped over into an adjacent fence injuring 18 people, 14 of which were sent to a nearby hospital with minor injuries. The ride reopened on June 1, 2006, after passing multiple safety inspections and tests.

== Worlds of Fun ==
- On August 7, 1993, two parking lot trams collided, injuring nine people including a park employee.
- On April 20, 2019, a massive brawl occurred during evening hours between groups of teenagers near the Planet Snoopy area.

=== Barnstormer ===
- On June 30, 1978, during Barnstormer's first season of operation, a malfunction caused the spinning planes carrying riders to descend rapidly, impacting each other on the way down. Some riders were also sprayed with hydraulic fluid. Twenty riders suffered minor injuries.

=== Extremeroller ===
- On May 18, 1976, an 8-year-old boy was critically injured on Extremeroller, named Screamroller at the time, after being struck by a coaster train when he unknowingly entered a restricted area. He was taken to a nearby hospital and reported to be in serious condition. Barriers were later installed underneath the ride to prevent future occurrences. A lawsuit was filed the following year, which awarded the boy's family $1.39 million in a court settlement against Mid-America Enterprises for his injuries.

=== Fury of the Nile ===
- On June 19, 1984, a 9-year-old boy became trapped in his seat belt while on Fury of the Nile after a raft struck another and overturned, breaking his leg.

=== Mamba ===
- In October 2025, multiple guests reported that the seatbelts on the ride had unlatched during its operation: once on October 11 and again on October 12. Inspectors from the Missouri Division of Fire Safety evaluated the coaster and determined some seatbelts were "not functioning properly." The ride was taken out of service for repairs, during which time 18 seatbelt buckles were replaced. A park spokesperson explained that the ride is equipped with a "multi-layered restraint system," meaning that the seatbelts are a redundant safety feature, and that the ride had operated safely since the initial concerns were raised.

=== Oceans of Fun ===
- On June 23, 2016, a 66-year-old man was arrested by police after allegedly exposing himself to a 12-year-old girl in the wave pool and making physical contact with a 13-year-old girl. He was charged with sexual misconduct.
- On August 24, 2019, a 14-year-old boy nearly drowned in the wave pool. Lifeguards pulled the unresponsive victim out of the water, and paramedics regained his pulse after performing CPR. The boy later died at a local hospital after being removed from life support.
- On July 5, 2022, a 6-year-old girl was pulled by lifeguards from the Coconut Cove pool where she was drowning. The lifeguard performed CPR and she was later transported to Children's Mercy Hospital where she later died. The pool was closed temporarily as a response to this incident.

=== Orient Express ===
- On June 14, 1987, a train on Orient Express pulling into the loading station malfunctioned and slammed into the rear of another parked train. Of the 56 passengers, 8 were taken to a nearby hospital for minor injuries.
- On July 17, 1999, two cars of a seven-car train derailed, stranding 18 people. Eight of the riders checked into a local hospital with non-critical injuries. Severe internal metal fatigue in a support post was determined as the cause.

=== Timber Wolf ===
- On March 31, 1990, two trains on Timber Wolf collided shortly before returning to the station, injuring 35 people. The control system malfunctioned, losing control of both trains. The ride reopened operating with a single train until the control system was repaired.
- On June 30, 1995, a 14-year-old girl fell from the coaster and died. Eyewitnesses claimed to see the girl lift the restraints. The girl's family disputed the park's statement that the restraints were operating normally. The ride was temporarily closed pending an investigation of its safety features, which resulted in new lap bar installations. Park owner Hunt-Midwest and ride manufacturer Dinn Corporation settled with the family for $200,000.
- On August 2, 2014, an 11-year-old boy was taken to a nearby hospital after suffering a concussion and a bloody nose on the ride. As the train was descending a hill, he hit his head and nose on the restraints.

== See also ==
- United States amusement park accidents
