= Great Escape Lodge =

Resort and water park in Queensbury, New York

Great Escape Lodge & Indoor Waterpark
- Logo used since June 2026

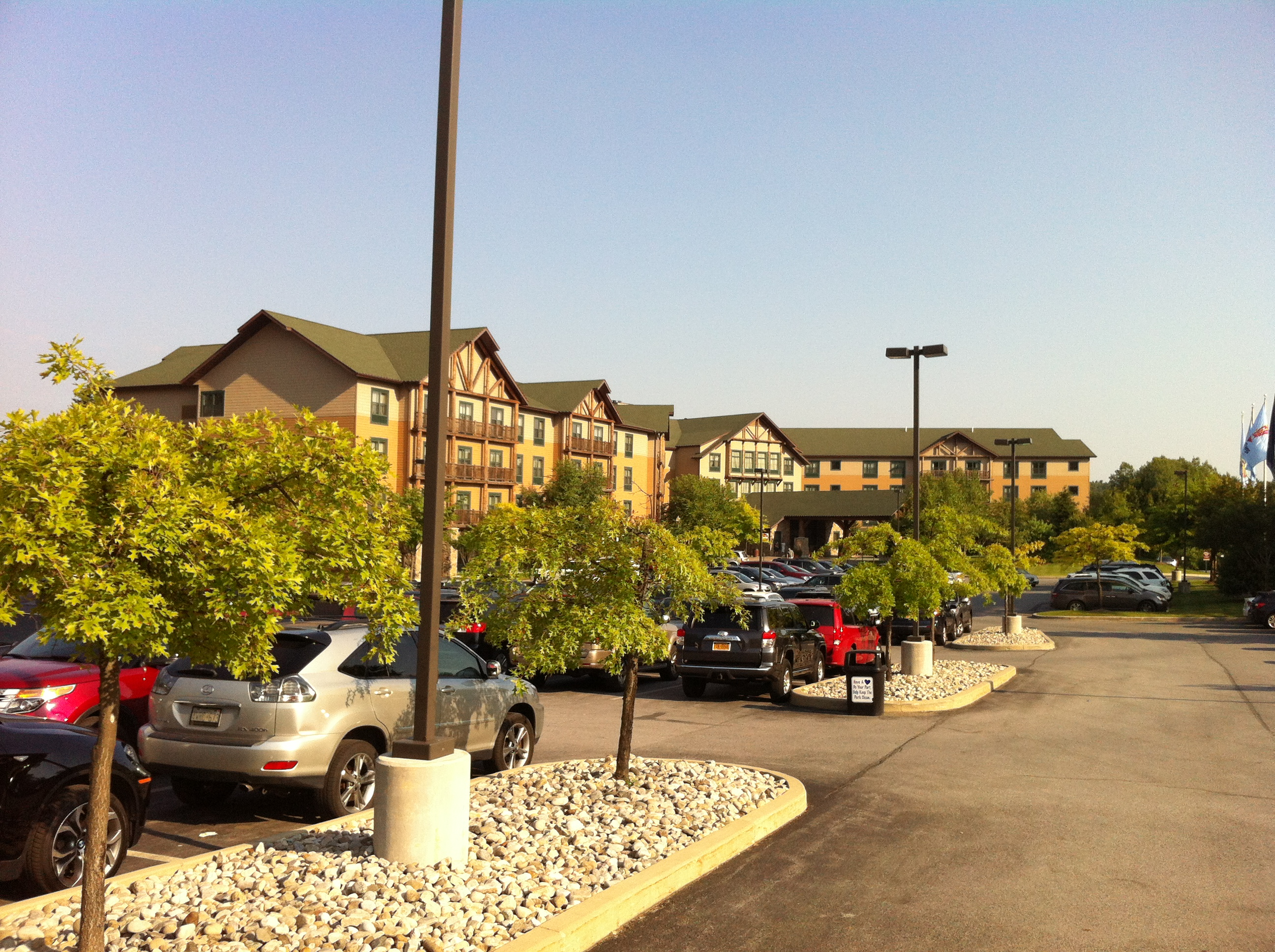
- Great Escape Lodge in 2013
- Interactive map of the Great Escape Lodge & Indoor Waterpark area
- Former names: Six Flags Great Escape Lodge (2006–2026)
- Hotel chain: Enchanted Parks

General information
- Location: Queensbury, New York, 89 Six Flags Dr, Queensbury, New York
- Coordinates: 43°21′07″N 73°41′48″W
- Opened: February 7, 2006
- Owner: EPR Properties

Other information
- Number of rooms: 200

Website
- greatescaperesort.enchantedparks.com

Great Escape Lodge & Indoor Waterpark, or simply Great Escape Lodge (formerly known as Six Flags Great Escape Lodge), is a resort and water park located in Queensbury, New York, and serves as the on-site hotel for the adjacent Great Escape amusement park. The resort is currently owned by EPR Properties and operated by Enchanted Parks. It was built in 2006 by Six Flags, which operated the hotel up until its 2026 sale to EPR Properties.

== History ==
The resort opened to the public on February 7, 2006, as the resort for The Great Escape theme park. It features 200 rooms and a 38,000 square foot water park which was previously called White Water Bay, with constant 80 degree water temperatures. The water park is open year-round.

Six Flags Great Escape Lodge & Indoor Waterpark was the second resort Six Flags built, the first being Lodge on the Lake next to Six Flags Darien Lake.

In November 2012, the resort announced an annual event, Holiday in the Lodge, to celebrate Christmas.

The resort was sold in April 2026 alongside the adjacent Great Escape, with Enchanted Parks becoming its new operator. The resort is simply referred to as Great Escape Lodge, dropping the Six Flags branding.

== Attractions ==
=== Attractions ===
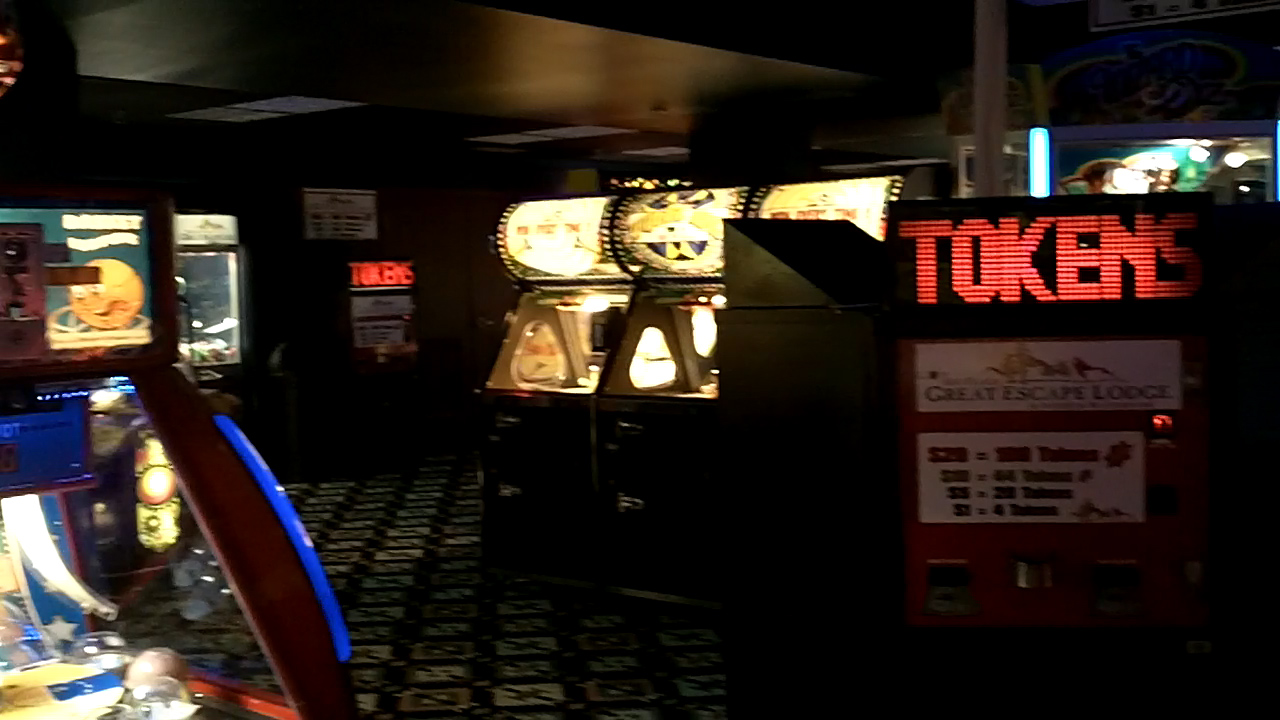
Star Light Arcade in 2012

- Star Light Arcade
- Tranquility Spa

=== Restaurants and shops ===
- Hurricane Grill & Wings (formerly Johnny Rockets from 2008 to 2024, and Trappers Adirondack Grille prior to 2008)
- Northwoods Traders
- Tall Pines Coffee Corner
- Tall Tales Tavern

== Water park ==
=== Attractions ===
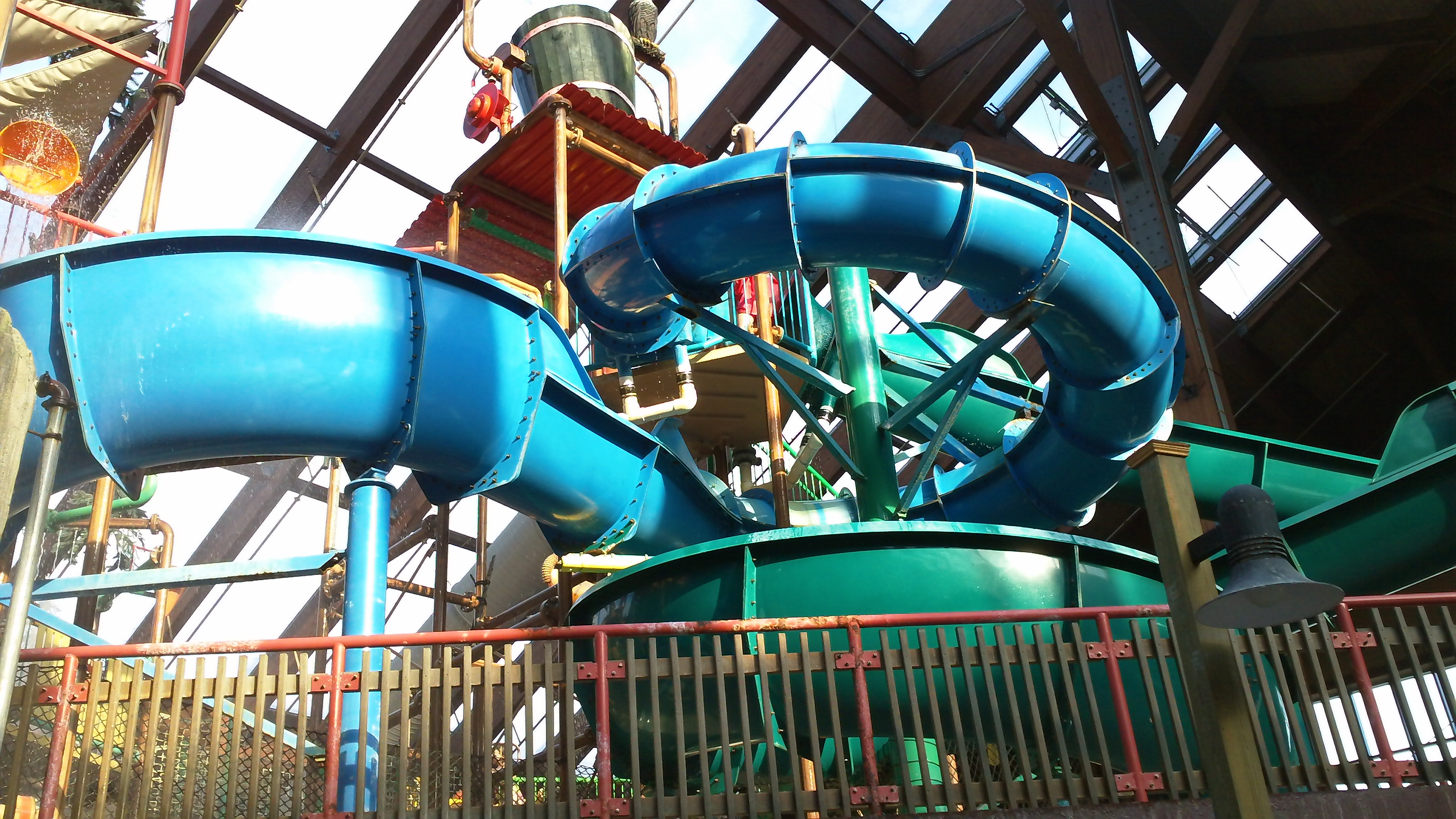
Tall Timbers Treehouse in 2012

- Avalanche (enclosed family raft slide)
- Boogie Bear Surf (FlowRider)
- Glacier Run (enclosed raft slide)
- Lott-A-Watta-Bay (swimming pool with water features)
- Snowshoe Falls (enclosed raft slide)
- Soakum Spring (water spa for adults 18 and older)
- Tak-It-Eesi-Creek (lazy river)
- Tall Timbers Treehouse (water play area with slides and water features)
- Tip-A-Kanu-Beach (younger children's water play area)

=== Restaurants and shops ===
- Birch Bark Grill
- Gitchee Goomie Gift Shop
- Kids Klub
- Northwoods Traders
- Tall Tales
