= Ext =

Ext, ext or EXT may refer to:

- An abbreviated form of extension in telephony, commonly written as "ext."
- Ext functor, used in the mathematical field of homological algebra
- Ext (JavaScript library), a programming library used to build interactive web applications
- Exeter Airport (IATA airport code), in Devon, England
- Exeter St Thomas railway station (station code), in Exeter, England
- Extended file system, a file system created for Linux
- Exton station (Pennsylvania) (Amtrak station code), in Exton, Pennsylvania
- Extremaduran language (ISO language code), spoken in Spain
- Extremeroller, a former roller coaster at Worlds of Fun, Kansas City, Missouri
- Cadillac Escalade EXT, a sport utility truck
