= The Tenor =

- Coordinates: 43.656761°N 79.380727°W
- Address: 10 Dundas Street East; Toronto, Ontario; M5B 2G9
- Opened: 2007
- Developer: PenEquity
- Manager: Bentall Kennedy (Canada) LP
- Owner: 10 Dundas Street Ltd.
- Num. of stores: 40
- Floor area: 360,000 ft^{2} (33,000 m^{2})
- Floors: 13 (10 above ground and 3 concourses)
- Parking: N/A
- Public transit: TMU
- Website: thetenor.ca

The Tenor (formerly Metropolis, Toronto Life Square and 10 Dundas East) is a retail, office and entertainment complex development on the north-east corner of the intersection of Yonge Street and Dundas Street in Toronto, Ontario, Canada. The project was delayed several times, and sits on a large parcel of prime land in the city's downtown core, on the north side of Sankofa Square. The complex was owned and developed by PenEquity Management Corp., but is now owned by 10 Dundas St. Ltd.

== History ==
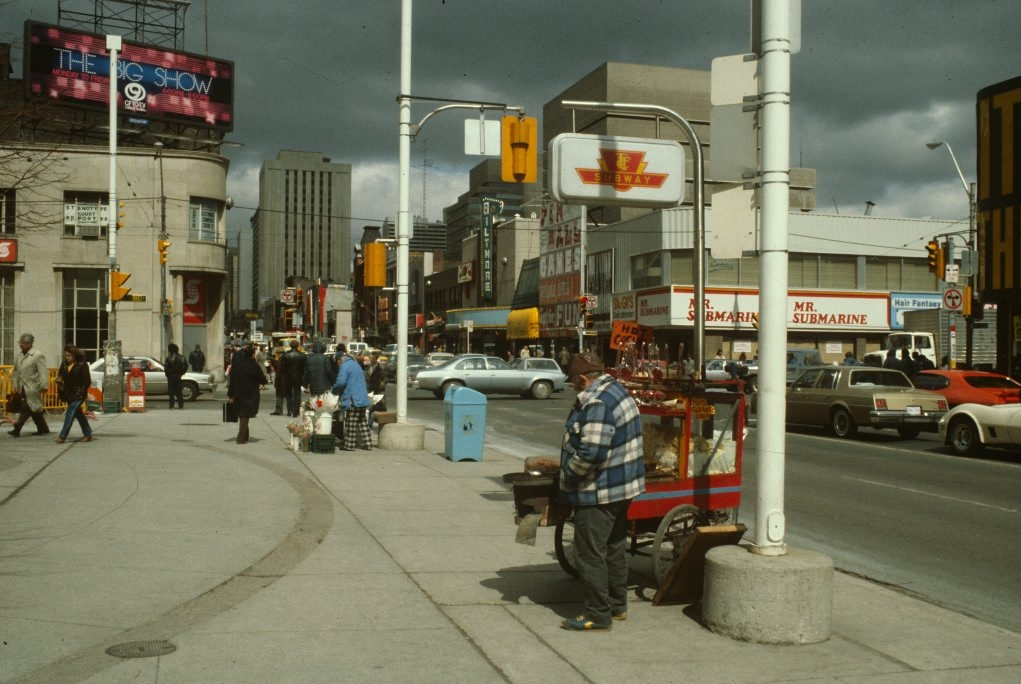
The future site of 10 Dundas East, circa 1985, when it was still occupied by a Mr. Submarine restaurant and a video arcade

Before 1998, the site was occupied by several buildings including the O'Keefe's Brewery (formerly Victoria Brewery) and a two-storey structure at the corner. From 1949 to 1974 it was home to the Brown Derby tavern and in the 1980s as a Mr. Submarine location. Many views of that intersection, and the local area as it looked in 1986, can be seen in the movie Short Circuit 2. All the buildings were demolished in the 1980s and 1990s with the site repurposed as parking lots.

The project was approved in 1998 with the opening planned for 2000. The land was expropriated by the City of Toronto immediately afterwards, and while construction boarding soon went up, the project suffered shutdowns and major delays.

While under construction it was known as Metropolis (as late as 2007), but when it opened, the complex was renamed "Toronto Life Square" after the local magazine. After the building was placed in court-ordered receivership in 2009, St. Joseph Communications, the owner of Toronto Life magazine, initiated a court action to have the magazine's name removed from the complex. The building was renamed "10 Dundas East" in September 2009. Entertainment Properties Trust, a Kansas City-based real estate investment trust that had provided construction financing for the project in 2005, acquired the complex in March 2010.

== Architecture ==
The project was built in an L-configuration around a number of existing buildings, including a parking garage belonging to the adjacent Ryerson University (now Toronto Metropolitan University). In exchange for the air rights to build over its land, Ryerson gained use of the movie theatres as classrooms during daytime hours.

The exterior facing Sankofa Square is primarily covered with giant video screens and static billboard advertisements of various sizes. The Yonge Street facade is made up of curtainwall store fronts with a glass and steel canopy overhanging the sidewalk. Toronto Star architecture critic Christopher Hume wrote a lengthy piece in the newspaper entitled "We don't deserve this horrorchitecture", which decried the building as a "nasty dark grey bunker". Daily Hive alluded the facade to Blade Runner 2049 per local artist Lucan Coutts.

== Retail ==
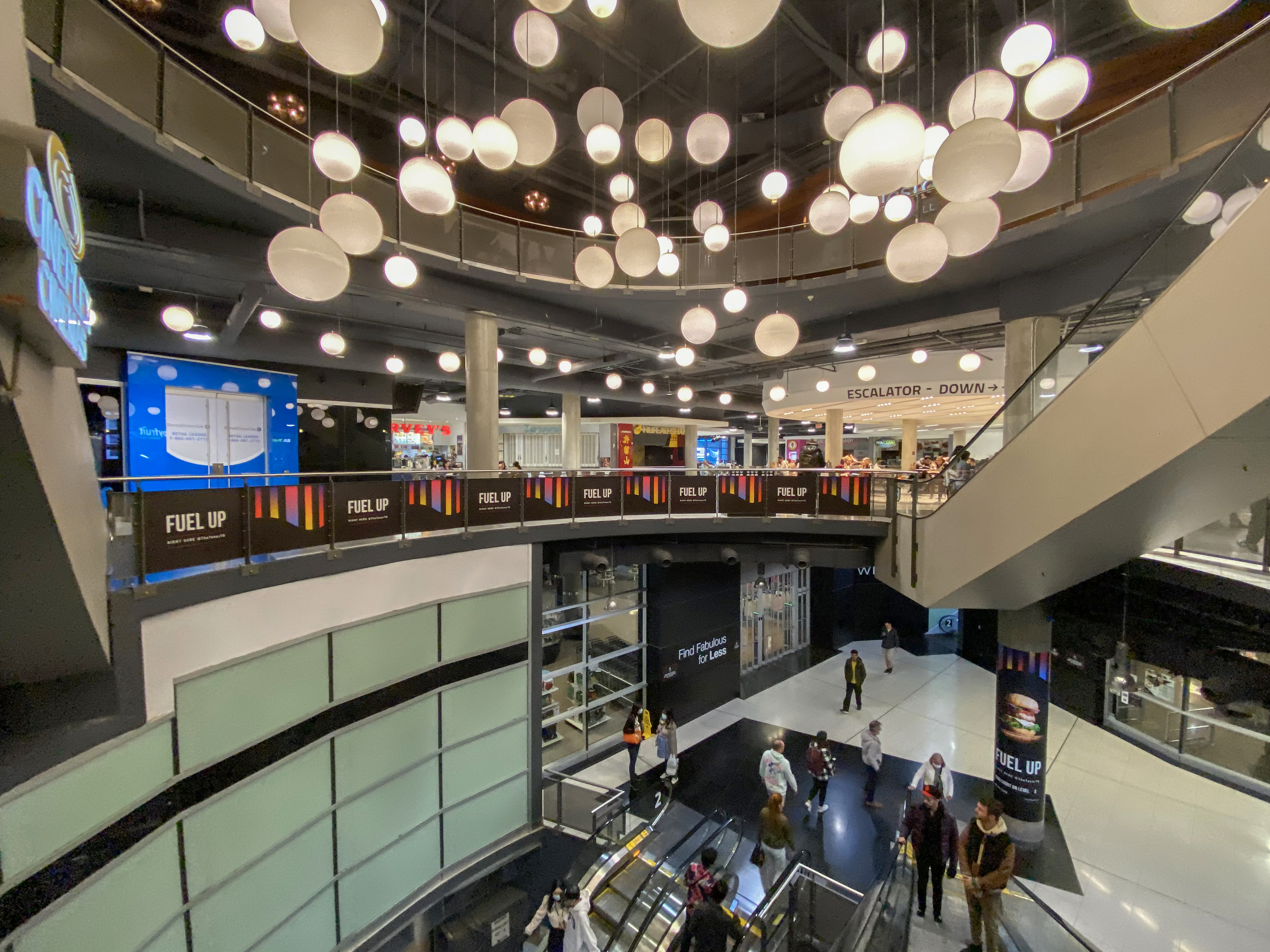
Retail Atrium

The Tenor is anchored by a Cineplex Cinemas 23-screen movie theatre, Dollarama, The Beer Store, the tourist attraction Pocket Planet Canada, and restaurants including Jack Astor's and Milestones. American fast casual restaurant Shake Shack also open in ground floor in June 2024, which is the first store in Canada and replaced the former Adidas Sport Store., which relocated to a new location a short distance down Yonge Street on part of the CF Toronto Eaton Centre complex.

Exterior shot during construction, June 30, 2006

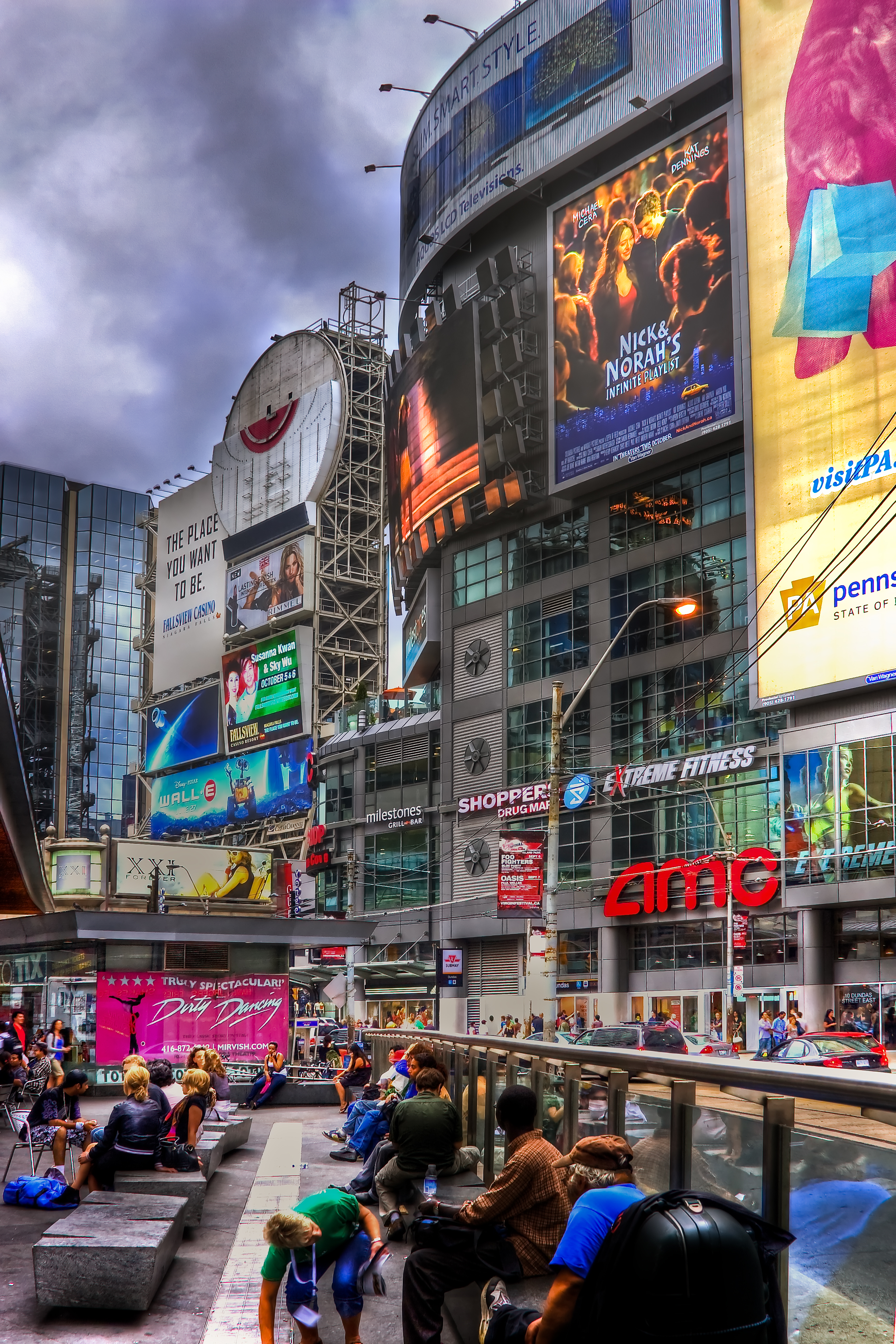
10 Dundas East in 2008

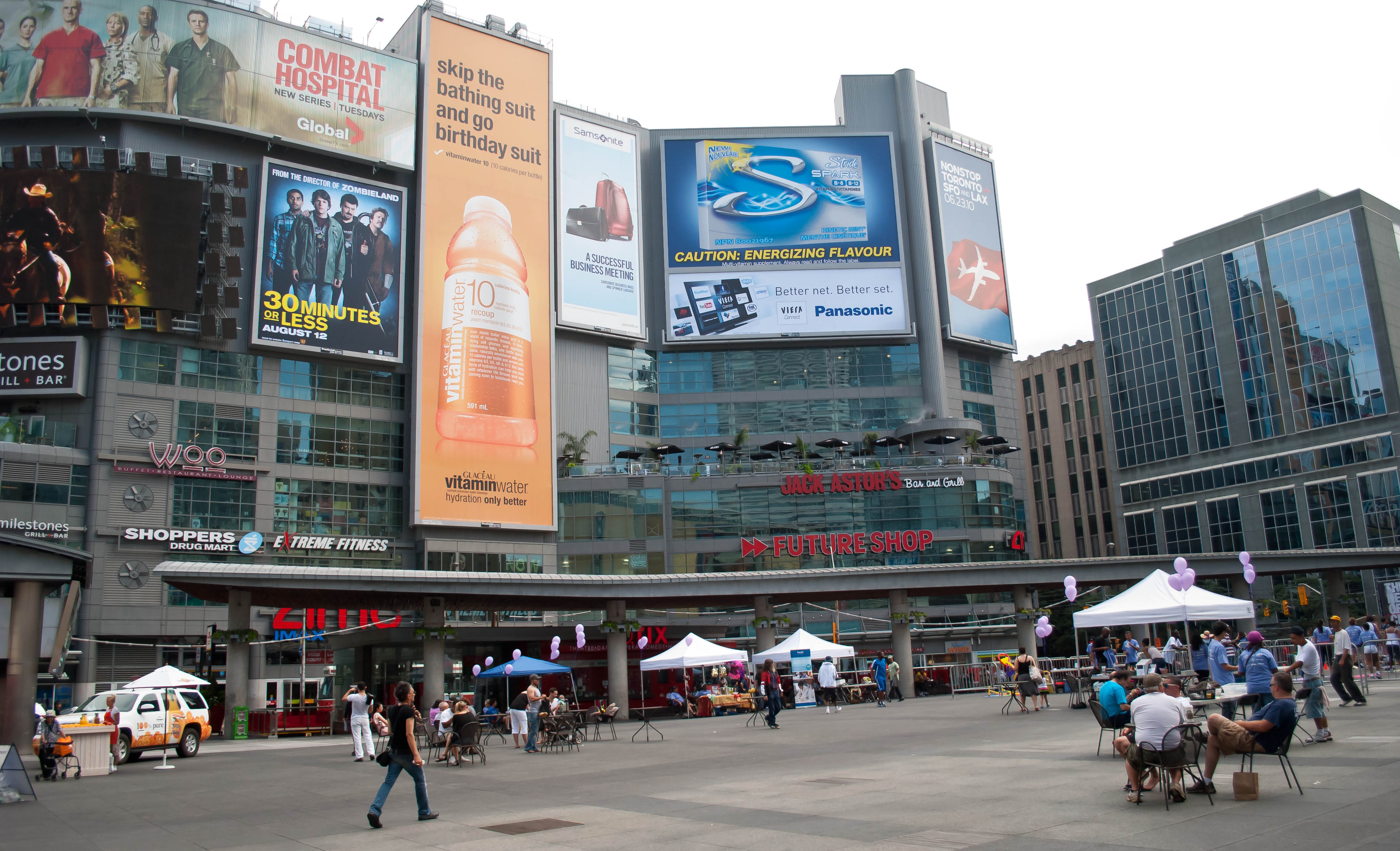
10 Dundas East in 2011

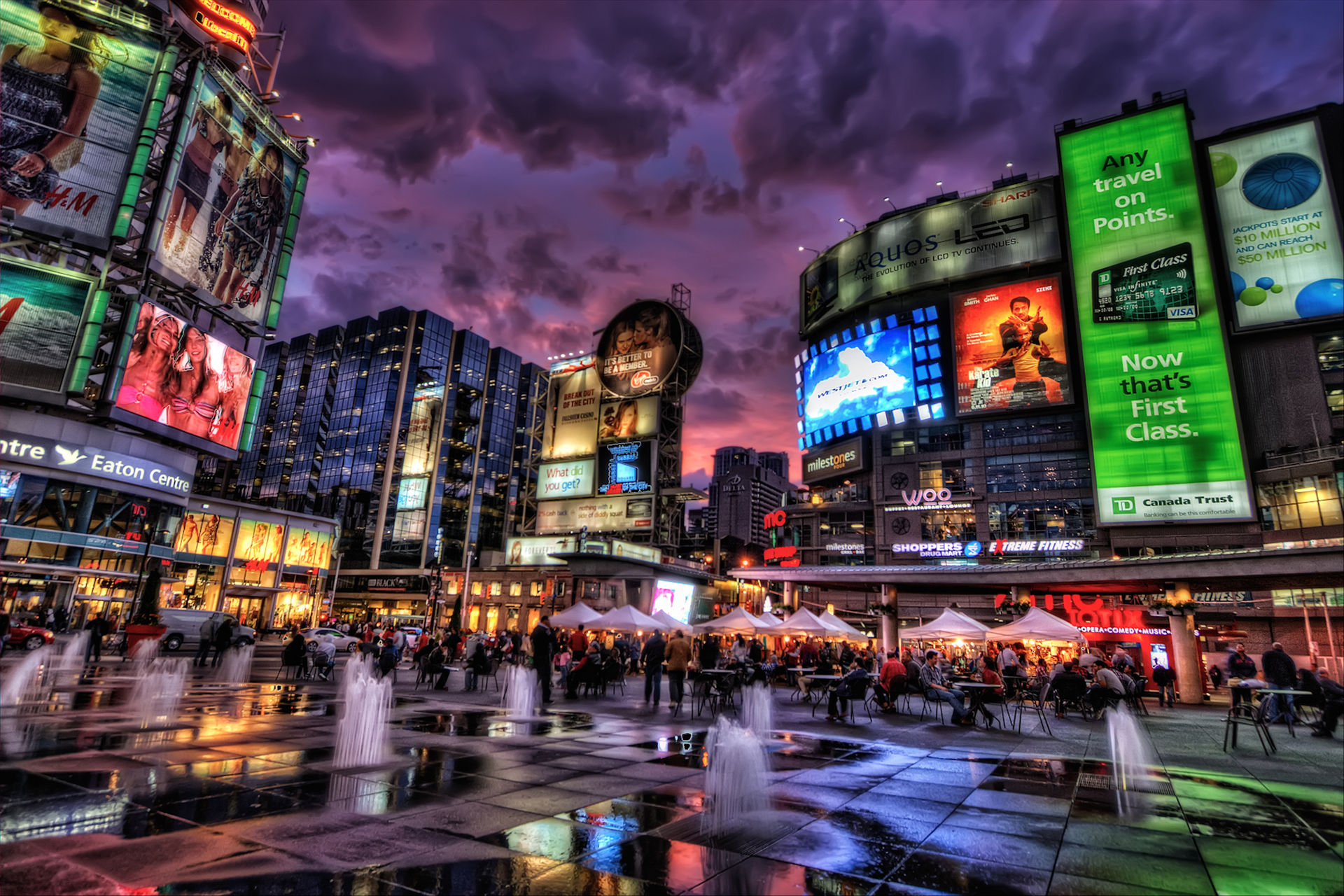
Across Sankofa Square in 2015

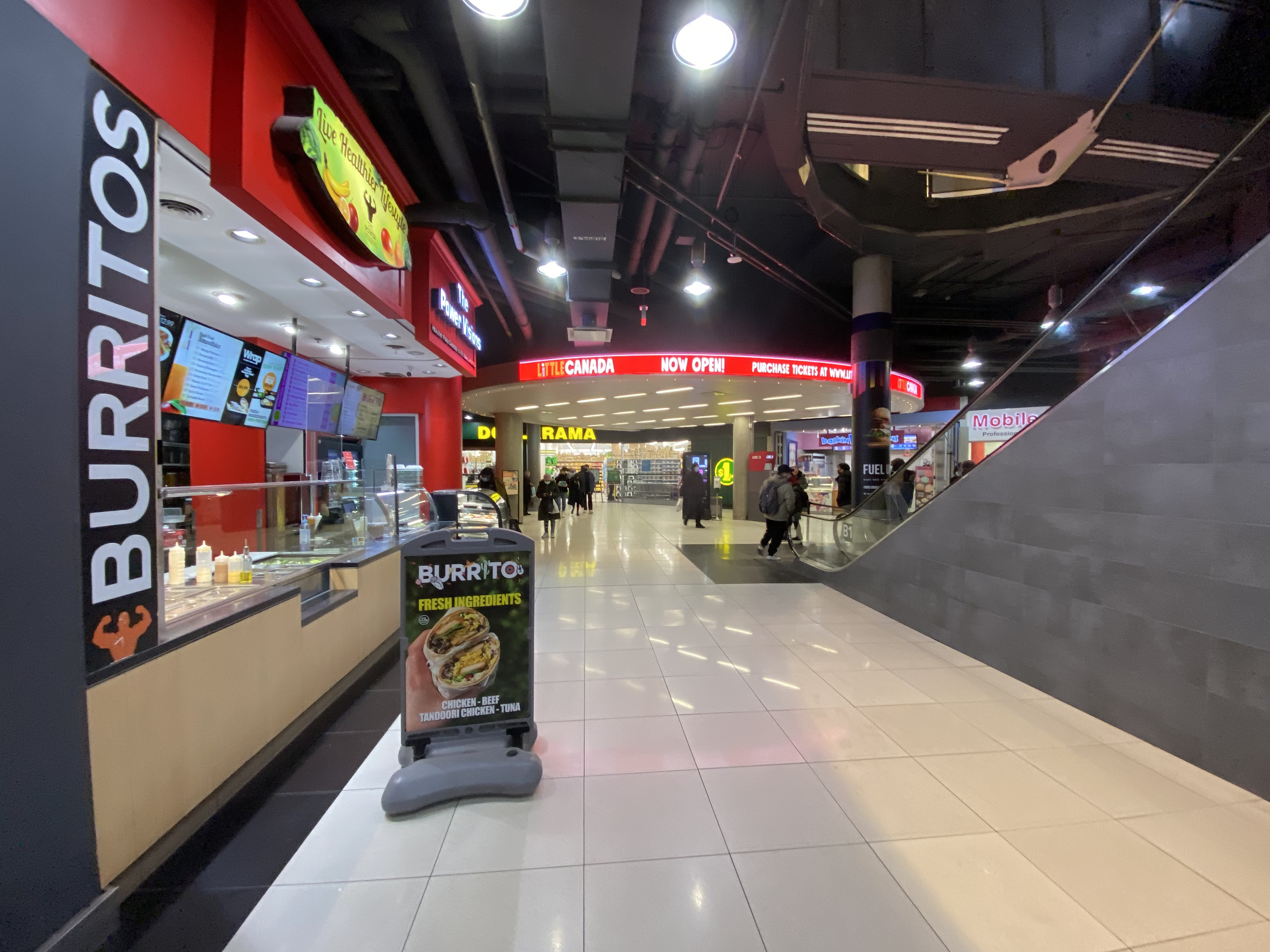
Basement shops

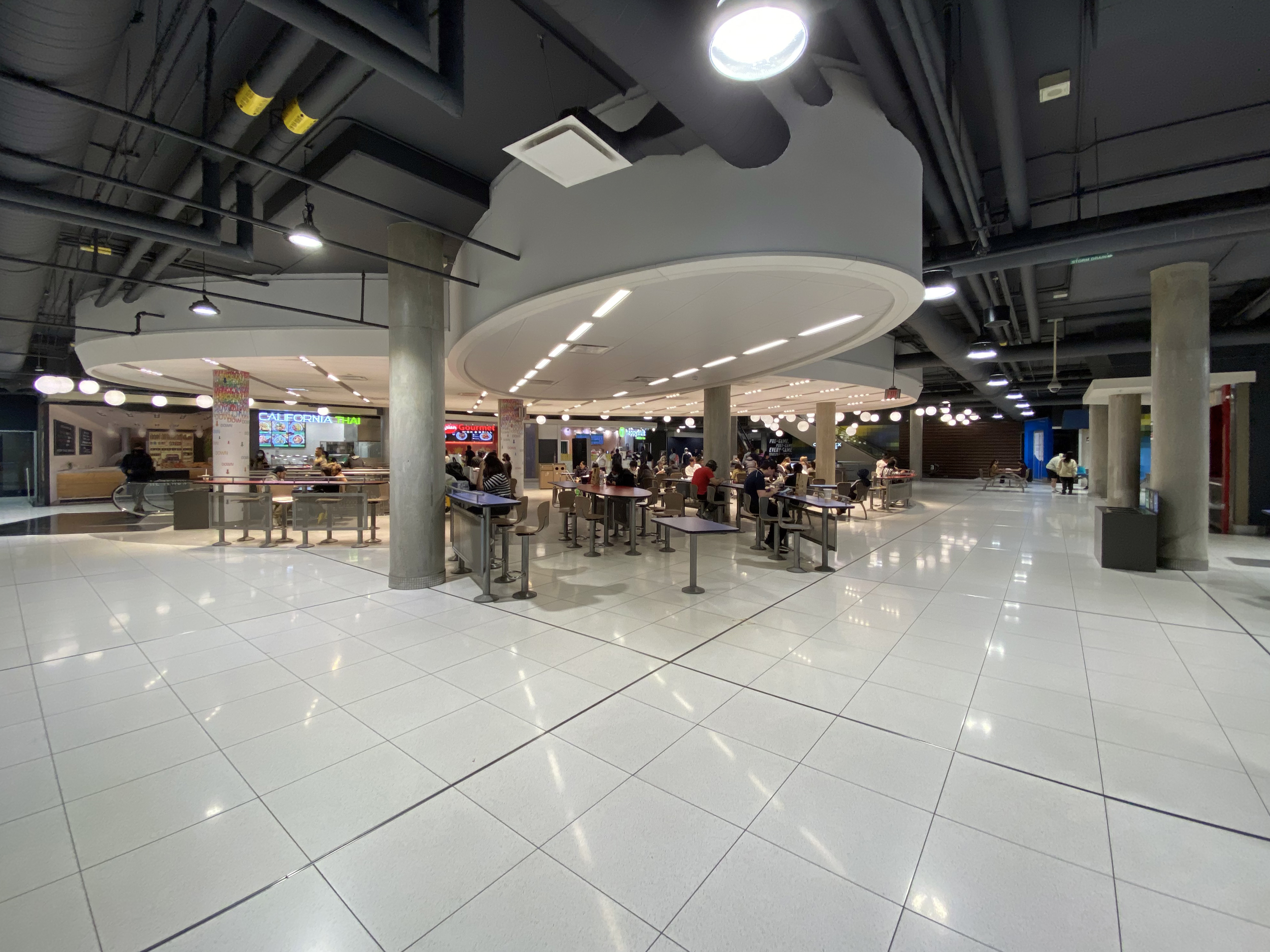
Food Court in Level 2

== See also ==
- Shopping mall
- Entertainment Centrum
