= Diggerland =

Theme parks inspired by diggers and JCBs

- Diggerland UK logo
- Interactive map of Diggerland
- Location: England; Castleford, West Yorkshire; Cullompton, Devon; Langley Park, County Durham; Strood, Kent; United States; West Berlin, New Jersey
- Opened: April 2000
- Owner: Hugh Edeleanu (Founder)
- Slogan: "Buckets of Fun for Everyone"
- Operating season: February–October

Attractions
- Total: 20
- Website: www.diggerland.com www.diggerlandusa.com

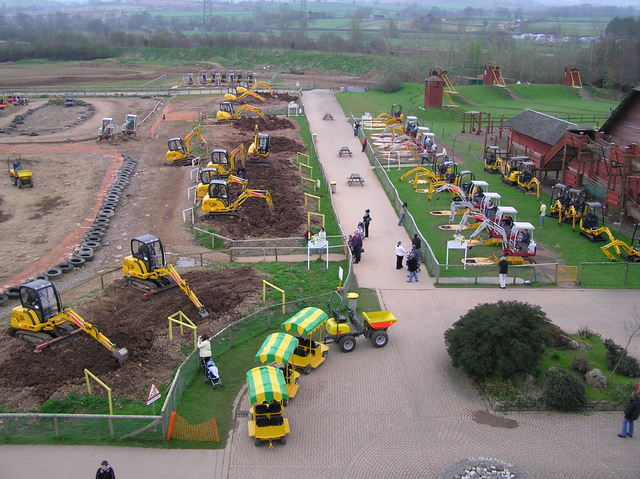
Diggerland in Devon

Diggerland is a chain of theme parks where members of the public can operate heavy machinery such as diggers and JCBs. There are four theme parks in England, and one in the United States. Diggerland is part of the H.E Services Group and Allsafety Limited. The United States theme park is operated by Enchanted Parks.

== Locations ==
There are four Diggerland theme parks in the UK, located in Strood in Kent (opened in 2000), Langley Park in County Durham (opened in 2001), Cullompton in Devon (opened in 2001, closed in 2020, and reopened in 2022) and Castleford in West Yorkshire (opened in 2007). In 2015, it was announced that Diggerland would open their fifth UK park in Evesham, Worcestershire, but this was cancelled in 2017.

Diggerland had a temporary park in Dubai during the summer of 2005. Their 2006 plan to expand to Richmond, Virginia, in the United States was stalled out by the Great Recession.

Diggerland expanded into the United States with an independent location founded by the Girlya family called 'Diggerland USA' opening West Berlin, New Jersey, in 2014. In 2020, a waterpark was added to Diggerland USA called 'The Water Main' which also received a 2 acre enchantment in 2022. In January 2025, the U.S. park was sold to Innovative Attractions Management (now Enchanted Parks) who had also acquired Enchanted Forest Water Safari the previous year.

England	Devon	Verbeer Manor, Cullompton	EX15 2PE	50.877°N 3.379°W
England	Durham	Langley Park	DH7 9TT	54.802°N 1.675°W
England	Kent	Medway Valley Leisure Park, Strood	ME2 2NU	51.382°N 0.477°E
England	Yorkshire	Willowbridge Lane, Castleford	WF10 5NW	53.718°N 1.385°W
USA	New Jersey	West Berlin	08091	39.813°N 74.923°W
