= Oceans of Fun =

Amusement park in Kansas City

- Joint logo with Worlds of Fun used since 2026

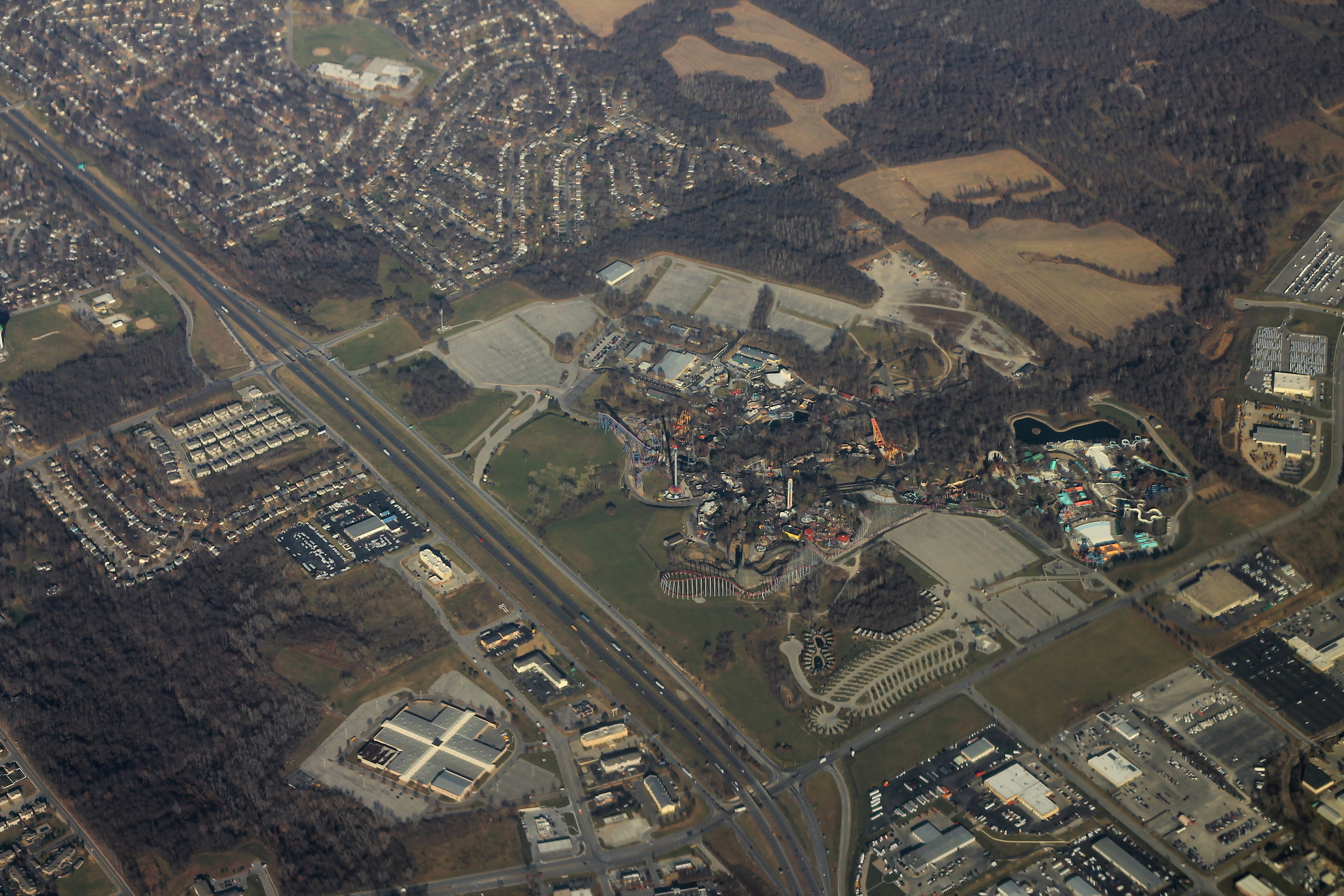
- Aerial view of the Worlds of Fun and Oceans of Fun parks (Oceans of Fun is the lower one)
- Interactive map of Oceans of Fun
- Slogan: Slide On!
- Location: Kansas City, Missouri, United States
- Coordinates: 39.17058°N 94.482422°W
- Owner: EPR Properties
- Operated by: Enchanted Parks
- Opened: May 22, 1982; 44 years ago
- Operating season: May through Mid-September
- Area: 64 acres (260,000 m^{2})
- Water slides: 10 water slides
- Website: worldsoffun.enchantedparks.com

Oceans of Fun is a tropically themed water park that opened on May 22, 1982, in Kansas City, Missouri, to celebrate the tenth anniversary of the adjacent Worlds of Fun amusement park. When it opened, it was the largest water park in the state of Missouri. It is owned by EPR Properties and operated by Enchanted Parks.

== History ==
The idea for what would become Oceans of Fun was first proposed by Lee Derrough, then General Manager of Worlds of Fun, in 1977 (the same year that Wet 'n Wild Orlando opened). Public announcement of the project came on December 17, 1980. Owned and operated by Lamar Hunt and his company Hunt Midwest, the water park was planned as part of Worlds of Fun's tenth-anniversary celebration. Early designs called for a 35-acre, tropical-themed facility featuring a wave pool, multiple water slides, an Olympic-size swimming pool, and a five-acre recreational lake, with an initial budget estimate of $6 million. Groundbreaking occurred on June 11, 1981. When Oceans of Fun opened in May 1982, its footprint had grown to 60 acres and total costs had risen to $7.25 million.

The park opened on May 22, 1982, with 16 attractions. Featured among these were Surf City Wave Pool, Castaway Cove (an adults-only swimming pool with a swim-up bar), and Buccaneer Bay (a four-acre lake originally used for water-skiing exhibitions). Nearby Buccaneer Bay stood Neptune's Lagoon, a one-acre, sandy-bottomed swimming lake. Another signature attraction was the Diamond Head slide complex, which comprised three slides (Maui Wowee, Honolulu Lulu, and Waikiki Wipeout) with a combined length of 1,200 feet (370 m). During its first years of operation, Oceans of Fun maintained a separate gated entrance from Worlds of Fun and required its own admission ticket.

In 1983, the park introduced Typhoon (a five-story, 400-foot (120 m) dual-flume racing slide), Frisbee Folf (a nine-hole disc golf course), Bobbin N' Wobblin' (an obstacle course on Neptune's Lagoon), and Treasure Island (a children's play structure). Four years later, in 1987, the Caribbean Cooler lazy river was added. In 1991, the Crocodile Isle children's water play area replaced the older Knee Hai/Belly Hai attraction.

Integration with Worlds of Fun began in 1992 with the introduction of Monsoon, a water ride located centrally between Worlds of Fun and Oceans of Fun. Monsoon's location allowed guests from both parks to access the ride regardless of their initial admission ticket. That same year also saw the introduction of the "Same Day Gateway", which allowed guests to visit both parks the same day without needing to access each park's main entrance. 1992 also saw the replacement of Neptune's Lagoon with Coconut Cove, a zero-entry pool. In 1993, Coconut Cove was expanded with the Aruba Tuba slide complex. The last attraction added under Hunt Midwest ownership was Captain Kidd's, an expansion of the children's area in 1995. Later in 1995, Cedar Fair L.P. acquired both parks. Under Cedar Fair management, Oceans of Fun continued to grow with Hurricane Falls, a family-style raft slide, added in 1999 (which replaced Frisbee Folf), followed by the Paradise Falls interactive water play area and additional slides in 2003.

On August 31, 2012, Cedar Fair announced a major expansion of Oceans of Fun scheduled for 2013. Under the plan, Worlds of Fun and Oceans of Fun would share a single admission gate, allowing entry to both parks with one ticket. The project also called for the addition of Sharks' Revenge and Predator's Plunge, a 65-foot (20 m) slide complex with six new slides (including drop-launch capsule slides) and a comprehensive renovation of the existing water park facilities. Site preparation and construction work began later in 2012. In 2015, Oceans of Fun added Splash Island and swan boats to Buccaneer Bay. In 2019, the park announced that Diamond Head would be closed at the end of the season. The removal of the slide will make way for Riptide Raceway, a mat racing slide. On November 6, 2019, it was announced that Riptide Raceway will be the world's longest slide of its kind, coming in at 486 feet (148 m) long. Oceans of Fun did not open to the public for 2020 season as a result of the COVID-19 pandemic.

On April 15, 2023, the park implemented a chaperone policy. It means that all guests ages 15 years old or younger must be accompanied by a chaperone who is at least 21 years old in order to be admitted to or remain in the park. On July 1, 2024, a merger of equals between Cedar Fair and Six Flags was completed, creating Six Flags Entertainment Corporation. Six Flags sold the park to EPR Properties on April 6, 2026, making Enchanted Parks its operator.

== Slides and attractions ==
Ride	Opened	Height Requirement	Style	Rating
Aruba Tuba	1993	Over 42" (under 60" requires a lifejacket)	Inner tube slide	3
Captain Kidd's	1995	Under 54"	Interactive pirate ship for children	1
Caribbean Cooler	1987	Over 42" (under 48" requires a lifejacket, under 42" must be accompanied by adult)	Lazy river	2
Castaway Cove	1982	21 years or older	Adult restaurant, pool, and swim-up bar	1
Coconut Cove	1992	Over 42" (under 60" requires a lifejacket, under 42" must be accompanied by adult)	Family	2
Constrictor	2013	Over 48"	Enclosed slide	5
Crocodile Isle	1991	Under 54"	Water playground for children	1
Hurricane Falls	1999	Over 46"	Inner tube slide	5
Paradise Falls	2003	Over 40" for large slides(Between 36" and 48" for small slides)	Interactive play structure	2
Predator's Plunge	2013	Over 48"	Drop-launch capsule slides	5
Riptide Raceway	2021	Over 42"	Enclosed mat racing slide	4
Shark's Revenge	2013	Over 48"	Enclosed slide	5
Splash Island	2015	Between 40" and 54"	Interactive kid's area	1
Surf City Wave Pool	1982	Over 42" (under 52" requires a lifejacket, under 42" must be accompanied by adult)	A wave pool with a maximum depth of six feet (altered from eight feet after the 2019 season).	4
Typhoon	1983	Over 48"	Racing slide	4

== Incidents ==
August 2019

On August 24, 2019, a pair of guests in the eight foot section of the one million gallon wave pool summoned lifeguards to enter the water to retrieve the submerged victim, 14-year-old boy, who had been under water for sixteen minutes. Though EMTs were able to regain a pulse, he was declared brain dead a week later after his 15th birthday. His organs were donated. In the wrongful death lawsuit which followed, the park settled for an unspecified sum.

July 2022

On July 5, 2022, CPR was performed on a, 6-year-old girl pulled from Coconut Cove at Oceans of Fun. One eyewitness reported foam coming from her mouth and nose during CPR. The Coconut Cove section of the park was shut down after the incident. On July 12, 2022, media reports indicated that the girl had died from her injuries.
