= Superior Shores =

Water park in Shakopee, Minnesota

Superior Shores Waterpark
- Logo used since 2026
- Interactive map of Superior Shores Waterpark
- Slogan: Minnesota's Superior Waterpark
- Location: Valleyfair, Shakopee, Minnesota, United States
- Coordinates: 44.79673°N 93.45014°W
- Owner: EPR Properties
- Operated by: Enchanted Parks
- Opened: 1983
- Previous names: Liquid Lightning; Whitewater Country; Soak City
- Operating season: Memorial Day Weekend to Labor Day
- Area: 7 acres (28,000 m^{2})
- Pools: 4 pools
- Water slides: 12 water slides
- Website: valleyfair.enchantedparks.com/rides-and-experiences/superior-shores-waterpark/

Superior Shores is an outdoor water park in Shakopee, Minnesota, United States, within the Valleyfair amusement park. It is owned by EPR Properties and operated by Enchanted Parks. It is included with theme park admission.

== History ==
The Panic Falls slide complex, built in 1983, was the original part of the park. Originally the area of water rides was called 'Liquid Lightning', but as more were added, the name was changed to Whitewater Country Waterpark in 1992. In late 2008, the name was officially changed to Soak City, consistent with the theming of other water parks of Cedar Fair. On September 11, 2014, Valleyfair announced a major expansion for Soak City. The main headline was slide complex with Breaker's Plunge and Breaker's Pipeline. Also added were Barefoot Beach, a kid's splash pad and sand volleyball courts.

At the end of the 2023 season, Raging Rapids unexpectedly closed permanently. On August 5, 2025, Valleyfair announced that Hurricane Falls, Panic Falls Body & Speed Slides, Ripple Rapids, and Splash Station would all permanently close after August 10 and would be replaced by something else that was announced at a later date. On April 28, 2026, it was announced that the name would be changing to Superior Shores, along with a new slide complex and kiddie area.

== Slides and attractions ==
Superior Shores occupies 7 acres (28,000 m^{2}) and features a wavepool, twelve waterslides, one raft ride, and a lazy river.

Name	Opened	Description	Height Requirement	Rating
Barefoot Beach	2015	A Vortex Aquatic Structures small children's splash pad	Under 54" or with child	1
Breakers Bay	2009	A WaveTek 34,000-square-foot (3,200 m^{2}), 350,000 gallon wave pool.	Over 42" or with adult, under 52" must wear life jacket	4
Coho Curl, Surgin' Sturgeon, & Wild Walleye	2026	A trio of WhiteWater West inner tube slides.	Over 42"	4
Fall River Run	1993	A WhiteWater 70-foot (21 m) tall 4-person raft ride. Previously known as Hurricane Falls.	Over 46"	5
Great Lakes Launchers	2015	Two WhiteWater AquaDrop and two Flatline Loop 65-foot (20 m) tall freefall body slides. Previously known as Breakers Pipeline.	Over 48"	5
Ripple Rapids	1993	A 1,200-foot (370 m) lazy river.	Over 42" or with adult, under 48" must wear life jacket	2
Pike Plunge	2026	A dual lane matt racer slide.	Over 42"	4
Splash Station	1993	A WhiteWater children's zero-depth water playground structure.	Under 54" or with child	1
Superior Plunge	2015	Two WhiteWater 90-foot (27 m) tall Freefall body slides. Previously known as Breakers Plunge.	Over 48"	4

== Defunct attractions ==
- Raging Rapids (1983 – 2023); A single person raft ride featuring waterfalls, rapids, and sharp drops and turns. The ride was removed prior to the 2024 season without announcement and has since been demolished.
- Panic Falls Speed Slides (1988 – 2025); Two WhiteWater 60-foot (18 m) tall Freefall speed slides.
- Panic Falls Body Slides (1983 – 2025); Three Technetic Industries 60-foot (18 m) tall body slides. Previously known as Liquid Lightning.
