= Timber Wolf (roller coaster) =

Wooden roller coaster

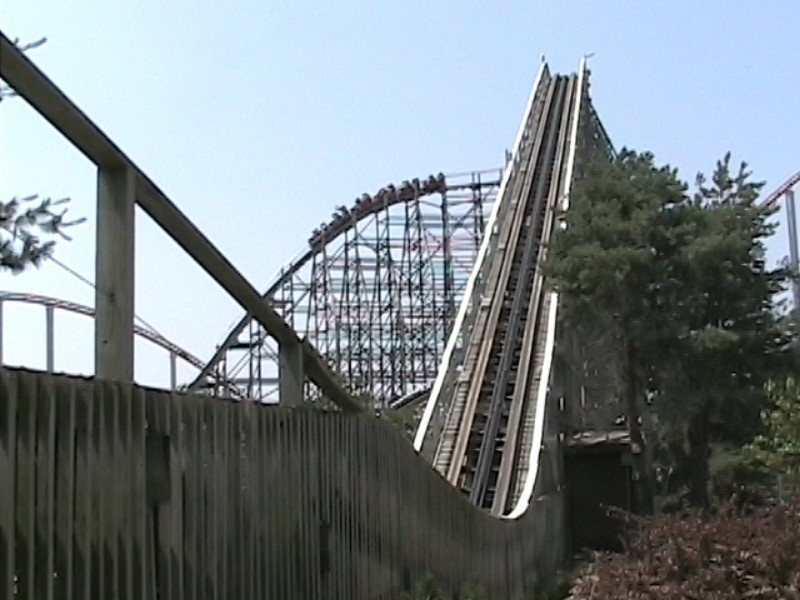
- Timber Wolf in 2006

Worlds of Fun
- Location: Worlds of Fun
- Park section: Wild West
- Coordinates: 39°10′22″N 94°29′21″W
- Status: Operating
- Opening date: April 1, 1989
- Cost: $3 million
- Replaced: Extremeroller

General statistics
- Type: Wood
- Manufacturer: Dinn Corporation
- Designer: Curtis D. Summers
- Model: Custom
- Lift/launch system: Chain Lift
- Height: 100 ft (30 m)
- Drop: 95 ft (29 m)
- Length: 4,230 ft (1,290 m)
- Speed: 53 mph (85 km/h)
- Inversions: 0
- Duration: 2 min 13 sec
- Capacity: 905 riders per hour
- Height restriction: 48 in (122 cm)
- Trains: 2 trains with 6 cars; riders arranged 2 across in 2 rows for a total of 24 riders per train
- Fast Lane available
- Timber Wolf at RCDB

Timber Wolf is a wooden roller coaster located at Worlds of Fun in Kansas City, Missouri, United States. Timber Wolf was designed by Curtis D. Summers and was built by the Dinn Corporation. It opened on April 1, 1989.

== History ==
The construction of Timber Wolf commenced in September 1988. During the 1988–1989 off-season, crews installed approximately 70 feet of track each day. The project required 15 short tons (14 t) of nails, 80,000 bolts, and 680,000 feet (210,000 m) of lumber to complete.

The ride was re-tracked in the 1994–1995 off-season, replacing the 7-board laminated track with a 9-board track due to weathering.

In the 2006–2007 off season Timber Wolf underwent renovation involving extensive wood work. When the new season started, riders reported that the ride was smoother. In addition to the wood work, new faceplates were installed featuring airbrushed original Timber Wolf logos, rather than decals that formerly had to be replaced every couple of years.

In the 2007–2008 off season, Timber Wolf received new air-powered queue gates.

More renovation of the coaster was completed in 2010.

In 2018, the helix on Timber Wolf was replaced with a seventy-degree banked turn constructed by Great Coasters International (GCI), which manufactured Prowler. From 2006 to 2017, Timber Wolf was being re-tracked by GCI from the lift hill up to the track leading up to the 540-degree upwards-spiraling helix. GCI also re-tracked Timber Wolf from the banked turn to the brake run. Worlds of Fun also revealed a new logo for the ride, which is a modern take on the 1989 logo. The new Timber Wolf reopened on May 18, 2018, for season passholder preview night.

The park announced in early 2025 Timber Wolf would be closed for 2025 season. On September 18, 2025, the park announced the ride would reopen on September 20 for the remainder of the 2025 season.

== Ride experience ==
Timber Wolf was the first of Worlds of Fun's three wooden roller coasters. The coaster's highest point is 100 feet (30 m) and its largest drop is 95 feet (29 m), at which point it reaches speeds of 45 miles per hour (72 km/h) and incurs g-forces of 2.8. It also included a 560-degree upward-spiraling helix until 2018, when it was replaced with a 70-degree banked turn. Timber Wolf has a sign at its entrance saying "Extreme vibrations and roughness are a nature of this ride. Do not be alarmed."

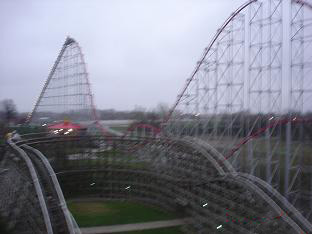
The "out and back" loops of Timber Wolf

After Worlds of Fun's purchase by Cedar Fair in 1995, trim brakes were added to Timber Wolf's first drop, slowing the ride considerably, similar to the now defunct Mean Streak at Cedar Point and the now defunct Hercules at Dorney Park & Wildwater Kingdom.

== Trains ==
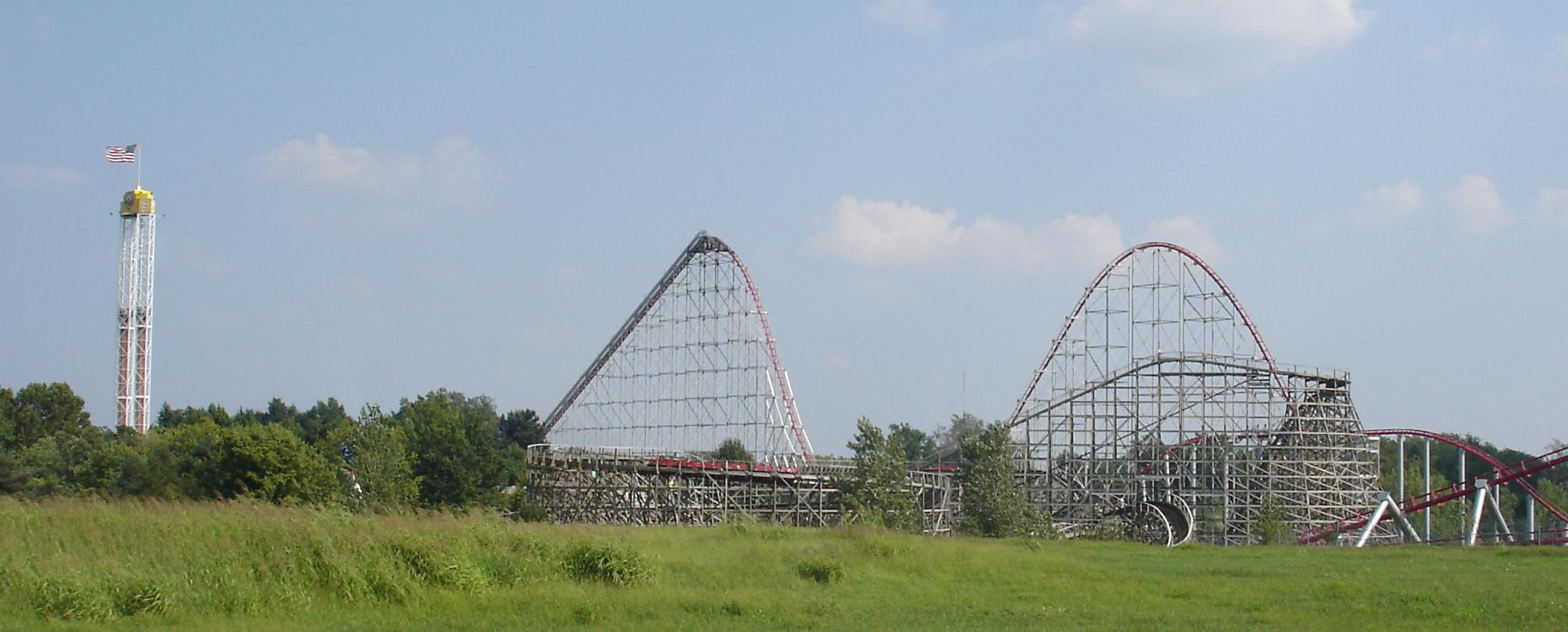
A view of Timber Wolf and Mamba from outside the park.

2 trains with 6 cars per train built by the Philadelphia Toboggan Company. Riders are arranged 2 across in 2 rows for a total of 24 riders per train.

During the 2022/2023 off-season, its formerly red trains were repainted orange.

== Rankings ==
Timber Wolf was voted the world's top roller coaster in the 1991 Inside Track readers survey, and was rated the number one favorite wooden coaster in the 1992 NAPHA survey. However, as the coaster has aged, its ranking in more recent polls has fallen considerably.

Golden Ticket Awards: Top Wooden Roller Coasters
Year	1998	1999	2000	2001	2002	2003	2004	2005	2006	2007
Ranking	8	14	19	23	-	30	35	45	49	-

== Incidents ==
- On March 31, 1990, 35 people were injured when two roller coaster trains collided just short of the loading platform. The control system malfunctioned, rendering the system unable to control two trains simultaneously. The ride reopened running a single train until the control system was fixed to handle two trains.
- On June 30, 1995, a 14-year-old-girl died after falling from her seat. A riding companion claimed that safety restraints (a lap bar and seat belt) had come undone on a sharp turn at the top of one of the ride's hills. Worlds of Fun officials claimed that witnesses had seen her remove her restraints and try to switch seats and that there had been no malfunction. The park's owners, Hunt Midwest Entertainment Inc., and the ride manufacturer eventually settled with the girl's family for $200,000. This made Timber Wolf the only ride at Worlds of Fun with a fatality.
- On August 2, 2014, an 11-year-old boy was taken to a hospital after suffering a concussion and a bloody nose on the ride. The boy said that as the coaster was descending the hill, he hit his head and nose on the restraint.

== See also ==
- List of incidents at Enchanted Parks properties
