= EPR Properties =

Real estate investment trust

- Formerly: Entertainment Properties Trust (1997–2012)
- Type: Public company
- Traded as: NYSE: EPR; S&P 400 component
- Founded: August 22, 1997; 29 years ago
- Headquarters: Kansas City, Missouri
- Key people: Robert J. Druten, Chairman; Gregory K. Silvers, CEO & President
- Revenue: ▲US$718 million (2025)
- Net income: ▲US$275 million (2025)
- Total assets: ▲US$5.70 billion (2025)
- Total equity: ▲US$2.33 billion (2025)
- Number of employees: 53 (2021)
- Website: www.eprkc.com

EPR Properties, formerly Entertainment Properties Trust, is a real estate investment trust based in Kansas City, Missouri, that invests in amusement parks, movie theaters, ski resorts, and other entertainment properties as well as private schools and early childhood education centers in the United States and Canada. It owns 353 properties as of 2022.

== History ==
Entertainment Properties Trust was created by AMC Entertainment executive Peter Brown and financial analyst David Brain. They decided to establish a REIT focused on megaplex movie theaters after failing to find an existing REIT to help finance AMC's development of theaters.

The company was incorporated on August 22, 1997. It held its initial public offering in November 1997, raising $278 million. By March 1998, Entertainment Properties had purchased 13 AMC theaters in sale-and-leaseback transactions.

In 2005, the company established VinREIT, a subsidiary focused on vineyard properties. It purchased a portfolio of six vineyards and wineries from Constellation Brands in 2008 for $115 million.

By 2010, the company was "evaluating" VinREIT after a downturn in the wine industry, and in 2011, all of the wine properties were put up for sale. The sales were completed by 2014.

Entertainment Properties Trust began investing in charter school properties in 2007, primarily through a deal with Imagine Schools. By 2012, the company owned 41 schools. The company changed its name to EPR Properties in 2012 to reflect its diversification into recreation and education properties. In 2015, Brain retired as chief executive officer.

In 2017, EPR bought a portfolio of properties from CNL Financial Group for $456 million, comprising the Northstar California ski resort, 15 waterparks and amusement parks, and 5 small family entertainment centers. In November 2019, the company sold its portfolio of charter schools for $454 million.

In March 2026, it was announced EPR Properties would acquire seven properties from Six Flags, consisting of six amusement parks and a water park, for $331 million. As of April 6, 2026, the sale of the United States parks were completed, while La Ronde in Canada is pending completion.

== Properties ==
As of 2022, the company owns 353 properties, including 175 movie theaters, 74 education properties, 56 eat-and-play properties, 18 amusement parks and water parks, 11 ski resorts, and 8 hotels.

Notable properties are listed below.

=== Amusement parks and water parks ===
- Calypso Park — Limoges, Ontario
- Camelbeach Waterpark — Tannersville, Pennsylvania
- Enchanted Forest Water Safari - Old Forge, New York
- Frontier City — Oklahoma City, Oklahoma
- Great Escape — Queensbury, New York
- Great Escape Lodge — Queensbury, New York
- Hawaiian Falls Garland — Garland, Texas
- Hawaiian Falls The Colony — The Colony, Texas
- La Ronde — Montreal, Québec
- Magic Springs — Hot Springs, Arkansas
- Michigan's Adventure and WildWater Adventure — Muskegon, Michigan
- Mid America Adventure and Hurricane Harbor St. Louis — Eureka, Missouri
- Nashville Shores - Nashville, Tennessee
- Pacific Park — Santa Monica, California
- Rapids Water Park — Riviera Beach, Florida
- Six Flags Darien Lake — Darien, New York
- Six Flags Hurricane Harbor Concord — Concord, California
- Six Flags Hurricane Harbor Oklahoma City — Oklahoma City, Oklahoma
- Six Flags Hurricane Harbor Phoenix — Glendale, Arizona
- Six Flags Hurricane Harbor SplashTown — Spring, Texas
- Texas Tides Water Park — Galveston, Texas
- Valleyfair and Superior Shores — Shakopee, Minnesota
- Village Vacances Valcartier — Québec City, Québec
- Valcartier Indoor Bora Parc — Québec City, Québec
- Wet'n'Wild Hawaii — Kapolei, Hawaii
- Wild Waves Theme Park — Federal Way, Washington
- Worlds of Fun and Oceans of Fun — Kansas City, Missouri

=== Eat-and-play properties ===
- Entertainment Centrum — 4 locations in Ontario
- New Roc City — New Rochelle, New York
- Ninkasi Brewing Tasting Room — Eugene, Oregon
- Topgolf — 36 locations

=== Ski resorts ===
- Alpine Valley Ski Area
- Alyeska Resort
- Boston Mills/Brandywine Ski Resort
- Camelback Mountain Resort
- Hunter Mountain
- Jack Frost Ski Resort / Big Boulder Mountain
- Mad River Mountain
- Northstar California
- Village Vacances Valcartier (sliding only)

=== Museums ===
- City Museum — St. Louis, Missouri
- Titanic Museum — Branson, Missouri
- Titanic Museum — Pigeon Forge, Tennessee

=== Golf Courses ===
Reunion Golf and Country Club - Madison, Mississippi
