= West Berlin, New Jersey =

Populated place in Camden County, New Jersey, US

- Census-designated place
- Location in Camden County Location in New Jersey Location in the United States
- Coordinates: 39°48′31″N 74°56′29″W
- Country: United States
- State: New Jersey
- County: Camden
- Township: Berlin

Area
  - Total: 1.17 sq mi (3.04 km^{2})
  - Land: 1.17 sq mi (3.03 km^{2})
  - Water: 0 sq mi (0.00 km^{2})
- Elevation: 167 ft (51 m)

Population (2020)
  - Total: 2,686
  - Density: 2,294.7/sq mi (885.97/km^{2})
- Time zone: UTC−05:00 (Eastern (EST))
  - Summer (DST): UTC−04:00 (EDT)
- Area code: 856
- FIPS code: 34-78410
- GNIS feature ID: 881678

West Berlin is an unincorporated community and census-designated place (CDP) located within Berlin Township in Camden County, in the U.S. state of New Jersey. As of the 2020 census, West Berlin had a population of 2,686. The area is served as United States Postal Service ZIP Code 08091.

Diggerland expanded into the United States and opened a park in West Berlin, New Jersey in 2014.

== Demographics ==
Historical population
| Census | Pop. | Note | %± |
|---|---|---|---|
| 2020 | 2,686 | | — |
U.S. Decennial Census

West Berlin first appeared as a census designated place in the 2020 U.S. census.

=== 2020 census ===
As of the 2020 census, West Berlin had a population of 2,686. The median age was 40.8 years. 19.1% of residents were under the age of 18 and 17.6% of residents were 65 years of age or older. For every 100 females there were 96.5 males, and for every 100 females age 18 and over there were 93.2 males age 18 and over.

100.0% of residents lived in urban areas, while 0.0% lived in rural areas.

There were 1,006 households in West Berlin, of which 29.9% had children under the age of 18 living in them. Of all households, 49.1% were married-couple households, 17.2% were households with a male householder and no spouse or partner present, and 23.9% were households with a female householder and no spouse or partner present. About 21.1% of all households were made up of individuals and 9.6% had someone living alone who was 65 years of age or older.

There were 1,023 housing units, of which 1.7% were vacant. The homeowner vacancy rate was 0.7% and the rental vacancy rate was 0.0%.

West Berlin CDP, New Jersey – Racial and ethnic composition Note: the US Census treats Hispanic/Latino as an ethnic category. This table excludes Latinos from the racial categories and assigns them to a separate category. Hispanics/Latinos may be of any race.
| Race / Ethnicity (NH = Non-Hispanic) | Pop 2020 | 2020 |
|---|---|---|
| White alone (NH) | 1,993 | 74.20% |
| Black or African American alone (NH) | 137 | 5.10% |
| Native American or Alaska Native alone (NH) | 1 | 0.04% |
| Asian alone (NH) | 137 | 5.10% |
| Native Hawaiian or Pacific Islander alone (NH) | 0 | 0.00% |
| Other race alone (NH) | 9 | 0.34% |
| Mixed race or Multiracial (NH) | 124 | 4.62% |
| Hispanic or Latino (any race) | 285 | 10.61% |
| Total | 2,686 | 100.00% |
