= WildWater Adventure =

Water park in Muskegon, Michigan

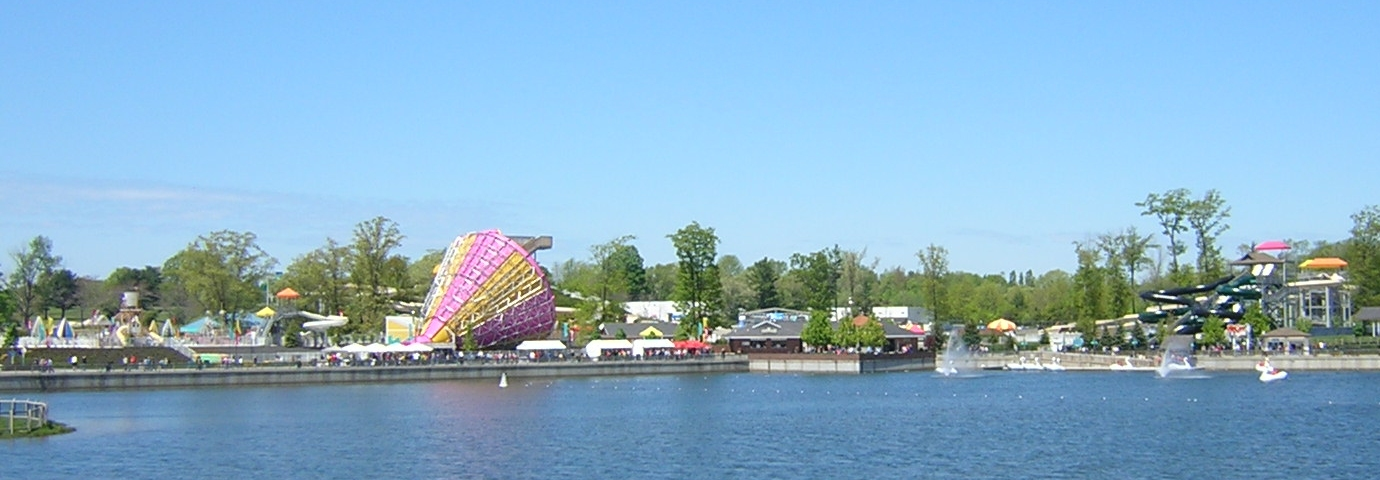
- WildWater Adventure in 2006
- Interactive map of WildWater Adventure
- Location: Michigan's Adventure, Muskegon, Michigan, United States
- Coordinates: 43.34740°N 86.27890°W
- Owner: EPR Properties
- Operated by: Enchanted Parks
- General manager: Carson Weingart
- Opened: 1990
- Pools: 3 pools
- Water slides: 16 water slides
- Children's areas: 3 children's areas
- Website: Official website

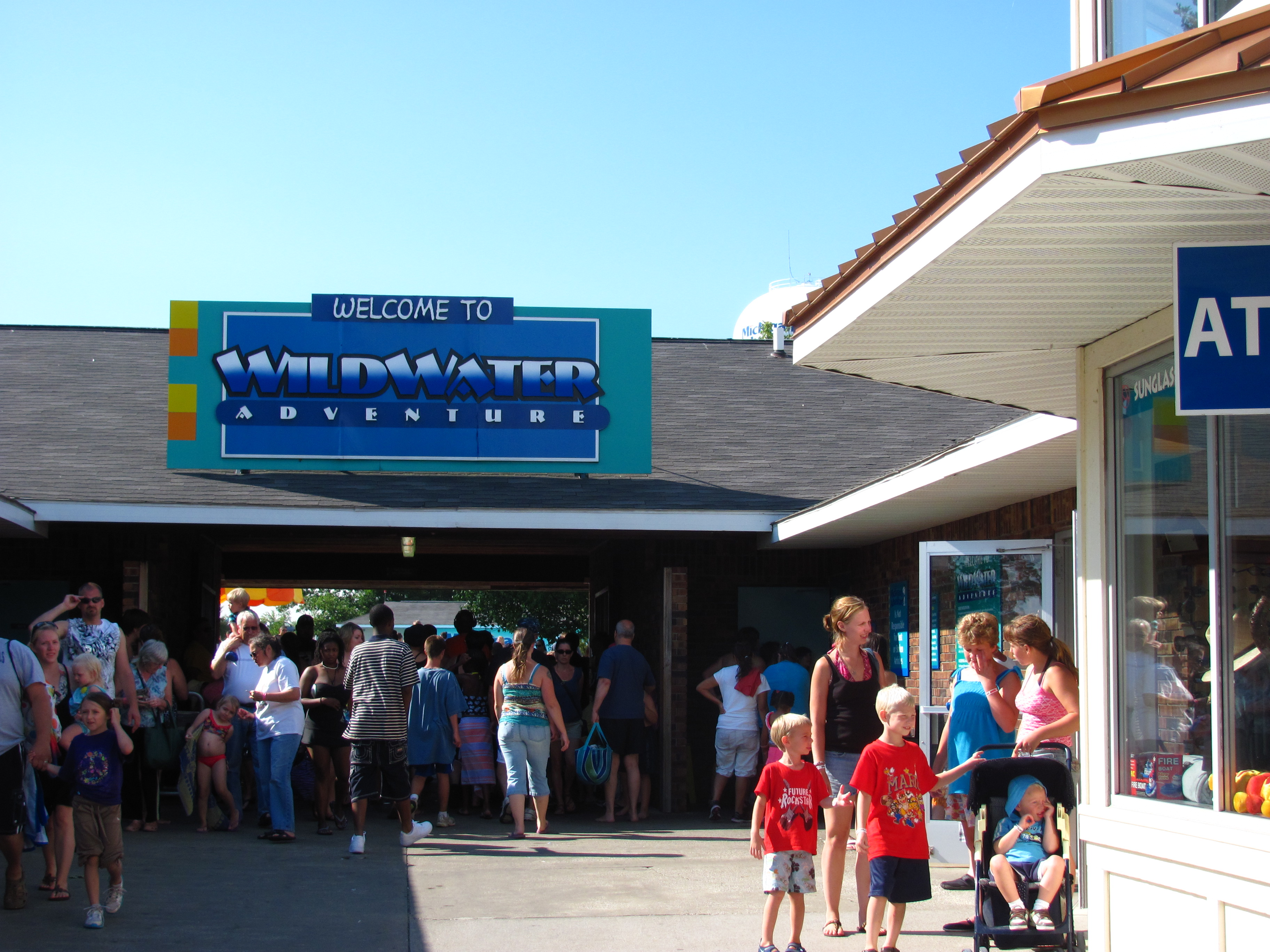
Entrance to WildWater Adventure from Michigan's Adventure

WildWater Adventure is a water park in Muskegon, Michigan. Located within the Michigan's Adventure amusement park, it is owned by EPR Properties and operated by Enchanted Parks. Admission to WildWater Adventure is included with a Michigan's Adventure ticket.

== History ==
WildWater Adventure opened in 1990, originally featuring eight water slides, a wave pool, a children's water play area, and a lazy river. An extensive expansion was carried out in 1997 with the addition of the Snake Pit slide complex, the Mine Shaft family raft ride, two more wave pools, and another children's water play area. Cedar Fair purchased Michigan's Adventure and Wildwater Adventure in 2001. In 2005, the Funnel of Fear Tornado slide was installed.

In 2010, Michigan's Adventure announced on Facebook that a new water play area called Beach Party would be added to the water park for the 2011 season. In 2017, the water park received several infrastructure upgrades.

In 2020, WildWater Adventure opened late and operated under restrictions due to the COVID-19 pandemic. On July 1, 2024, a merger between the park's owner Cedar Fair and fellow amusement park chain Six Flags was completed, creating Six Flags Entertainment Corporation. In 2026, Michigan's Adventure and WildWater Adventure were sold to EPR Properties, who hired Enchanted Parks to operate both parks.

== Slides and attractions ==
Name	Opened	Description	Height requirement	Thrill level
Beach Party	2011	Children's water play area by WhiteWater West. Replaced Jolly Roger Pirate Ship and Treehouse Harbor.	Over 36" on small slides, over 40" on large slides	2
Boogie Beach	1997	7 feet (2.1 m) deep wave pool	Over 42" or with an adult	4
Commotion Ocean	1997	5 feet (1.5 m) deep wave pool intended for children	Over 42" or with an adult	4
Cyclone Zone	1990	One enclosed and two open-air tube water slides	Over 42"	4
Family Lagoon	1990	Children's water play area	None, hand-held infants allowed	1
Funnel of Fear	2005	A 64-foot (20 m) tall Tornado raft water slide by ProSlide Technology	Over 48"	5
Half-Pint Paradise	1990	Children's water play area	Under 48" or with a child	1
HydroBlaster	2002	One or two person raft water slide	Over 48" or 42" with an adult	4
Lazy River	1990	Lazy river	Over 42" or with an adult	2
Mammoth River	1993	Two or three person raft water slide	Over 42"	5
Mine Shaft	1997	Two or three person raft water slide	Over 42"	5
Paradise Plunge & Tropical Twist Formerly Pirate's Plunge/Gang Plank (1997–2016)	1997	Children's body water slides	None	2
Ridge Rider & Wild Slide	1990	Two body water slides	Over 48"	4
Slidewinders	1990	Three body water slides	Over 48"	4
Snake Pit	1997	Three enclosed body water slides	Over 42"	5
Tidal Wave	1997	6 feet (1.8 m) deep wave pool	Over 42" or with an adult and wearing a life jacket	4

== Incident ==
- On July 11, 2014, chlorine gas was accidentally released into an area of the water park. 27 park visitors were treated and hosed off at the park, while 28 patients were taken to Mercy Health hospitals. All patients were later released without serious injuries.
