= Enchanted Forest Water Safari =

Theme park in Old Forge, New York

- Previously known as The Enchanted Forest of the Adirondacks (1956-1988)

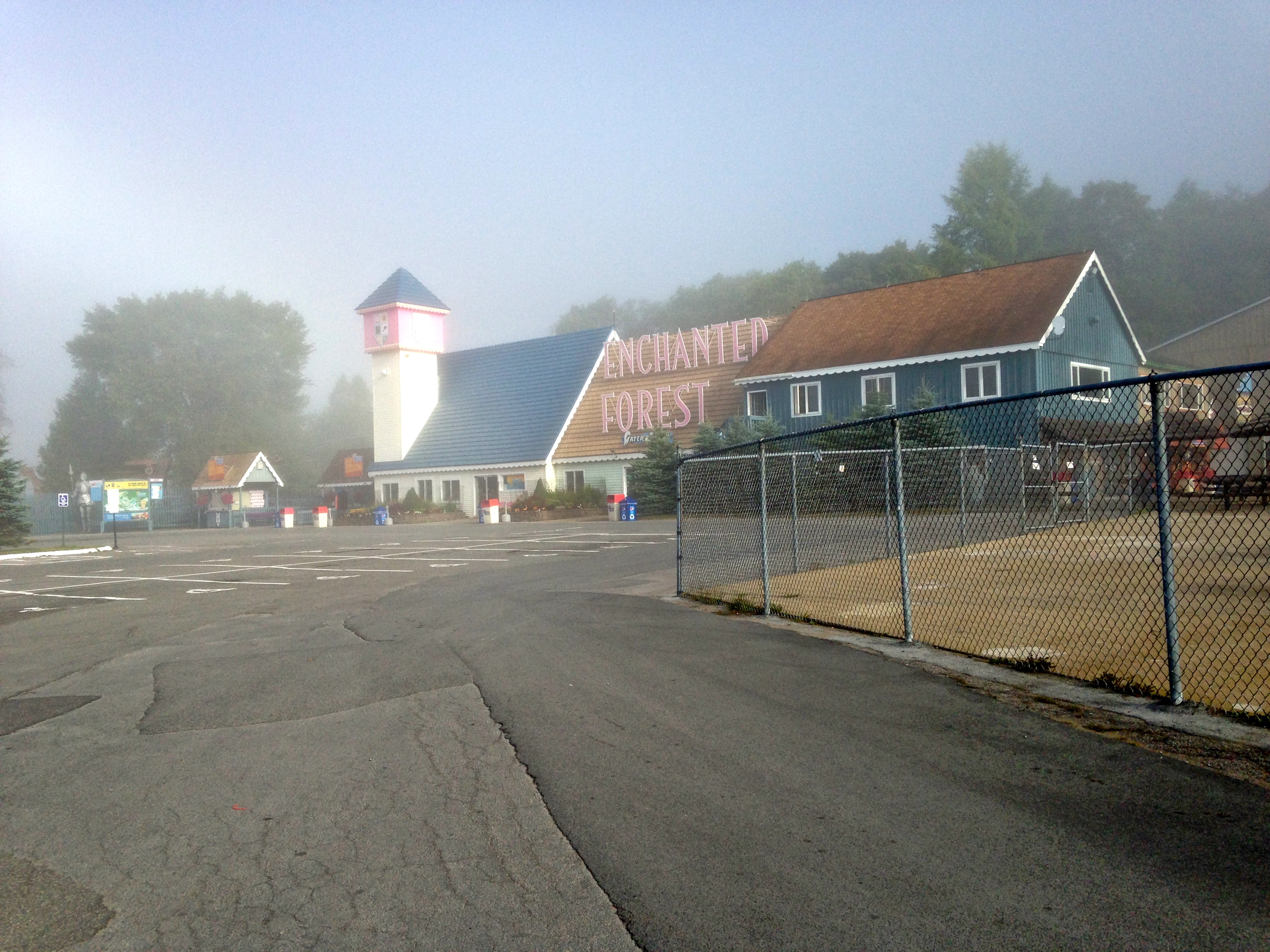
- Enchanted Forest Water Safari's front gate in 2014
- Interactive map of Enchanted Forest Water Safari
- Location: Old Forge, Adirondack Region – New York, U.S.
- Coordinates: 43.71775°N 74.96618°W
- Status: Operating
- Opened: July 7, 1956; 70 years ago
- Owner: EPR Properties
- Operated by: Enchanted Parks
- Slogan: Where The Fun Never Stops

Attractions
- Total: 50+
- Water rides: 32+
- Website: Official website

Enchanted Forest Water Safari (originally known as The Enchanted Forest of the Adirondacks and often called the Enchanted Forest and Water Safari) is an amusement park and water park. Operated by Enchanted Parks, it is the largest water park in New York, United States, and is located within Old Forge, in the Adirondack region. EPR Properties, a real estate investment trust, owns the park.

== History ==
The park was opened as The Enchanted Forest of the Adirondacks in 1956 by A. Richard Cohen, a hardware store owner and commissioner for the Adirondack Authority in charge of the development of ski centres on Whiteface and Gore mountains. When opened, it had 35 employees and encompassed 35 acres (140,000 m^{2}) of swampland. Admission was $1 for adults and 25¢ for children. Over time, the park expanded in size to its present 60 acres (240,000 m^{2}).

The design for the park, incorporating a large circus tent and a series of houses with themes from children's nursery rhymes and fairy tales, was based upon research by Cohen's daughter and wife, whom he sent to several amusement parks across the country to study how they worked. Concept watercolor paintings for the park were done by Russell Patterson, who also worked on the designs of the several individual fairy tale houses in the park.

The only mechanical ride at the park in 1956 was a train, the Enchanted Forest Express, that traveled around the park. However, this changed during the 1960s when more rides were introduced to the park.

In 1977, Cohen sold the park to the Noonan family. In 1988, the park's name was changed to Enchanted Forest Water Safari, after a major expansion that added numerous waterslides to the park. Following the success of Wild Waters (two 350-foot (110 m) waterslides) that had been added in 1984. Leading to opening Raging rapids water slide and the tadpole hole kid's water area in 1986.

In 1999 a further expansion titled Adirondack Expedition added 8 more water rides to the park along with another kiddy play area called the Sawmill.

In March 2024 the park and an adjacent hotel and campground also owned by the park was sold to Florida based hospitality company Innovative Attractions Management for an undisclosed sum.

== Rides and attractions ==
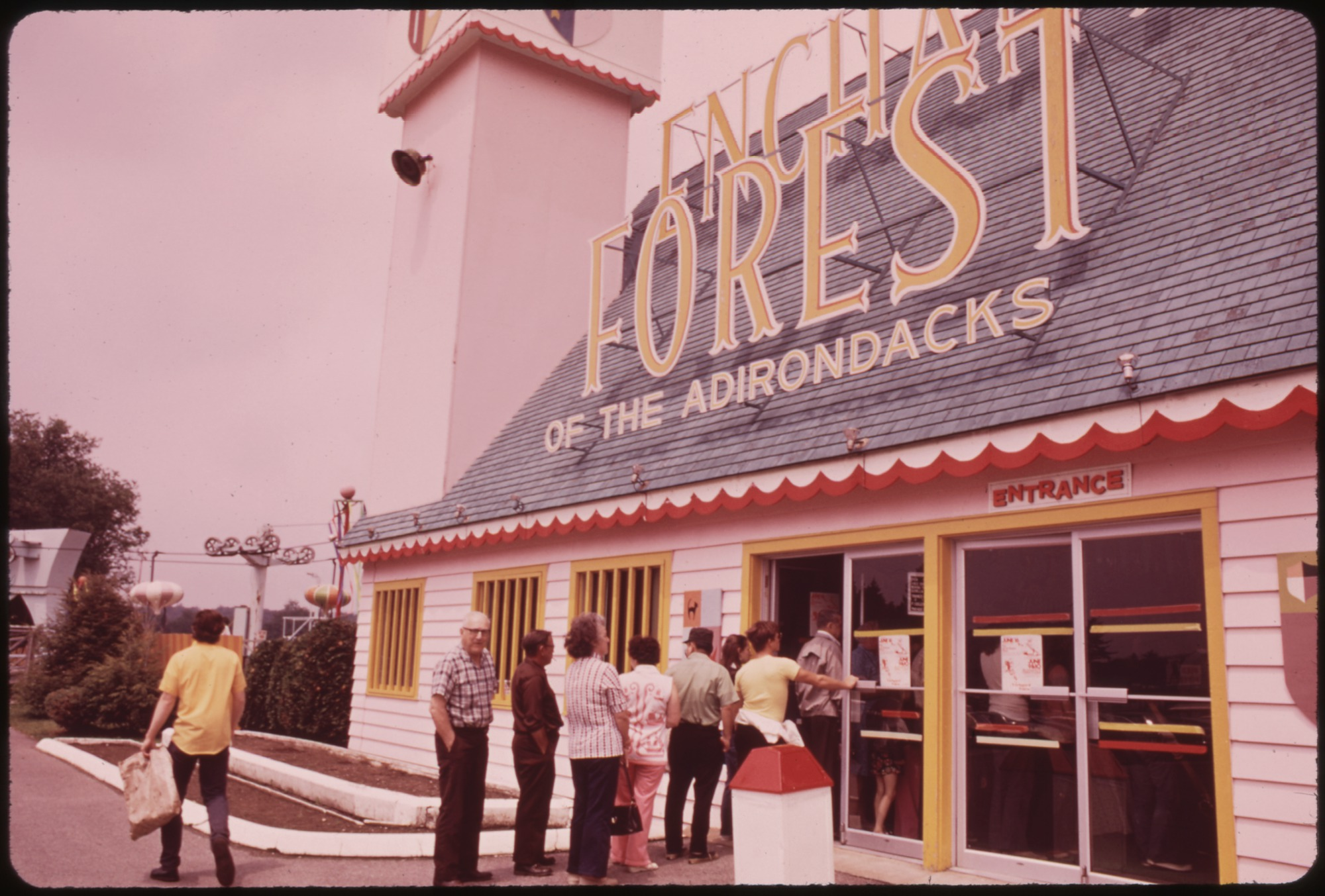
Entrance to Enchanted Forest in 1973

Water rides

- Amazon - A 1,100-foot (340 m) family tube ride through jungle scenery.
- Black River - A 500-foot-long (150 m) double tube slide that is completely dark, except for a few sections that have air-holes in the slide.
- Bombay Blasters - Two fully enclosed body slides, one a bit taller than the other, that end with a splash in Lake Nakura.
- Cascade Falls - A 500-foot (150 m) family tube ride that's full of twists and turns, and ends in a pool at the bottom.
- Curse of the Silverback - A "toilet-bowl" type double-tube ride that starts with a fully enclosed drop, and then emerges to spiral around a bowl, before exiting the bowl and ending in a small pool.
- Kid Wash - A car-wash themed walk-through ride for small children.
- Killermanjaro's Revenge - Added in 2020, opened in June 2021 due to the COVID-19 pandemic.
- Lake Nakura - A safari-themed area featuring a small free-swim swimming pool and a second pool where swimmers test their strength crossing a ropes course to the other side. The third pool is the splash zone for the Bombay Blasters and Nairobi Narrows.
- Log Jammer - A lazy river type ride that includes a mini-wavepool.
- Mamba Strike - Added in 2020, opened in June 2021 due to the COVID-19 pandemic.
- Nairobi Narrows - Two parallel short but steep body slides that end in Lake Nakura.
- Pygmy Pond - A children's area featuring small slides and some swings; also three slides for small children.
- Raging Rapids - A fast and bumpy single-tube ride down 700 feet (210 m) with caves and waterfalls.
- Rondaxe Run - Another double-tube slide featuring a number of enclosed and open sections with loads of waterfalls and banked turns in between.
- Safari River Expedition - A lazy river type ride with a few waterfalls and water spouts
- Sawmill - A small area for families where children can climb up towers and go down several different slides. The sawmill features two slides for children, a slightly more intense one, and at the top, a very curvy slide. At the bottom of the sawmill, there are jets and water spouts to play with. Every so often a log at the top of the sawmill will dump water over everyone in the splash zone.
- Serengeti Stampede - Added in 2020, opened in June 2021 due to the COVID-19 pandemic.
- The Shadow - Two fully enclosed, transparent and speedy slides ending in a pool.
- Tidal Wave Pool - A 1/4 acre wave pool with waves up to four feet tall.
- Walter's Wild Slide - Only for children, it is similar to the Serengeti Surf Hill, but without the mat. Children sit down and race each other to the bottom.

Amusement rides

- Boats
- Bumper Cars
- Carousel - A carousel built in 1920 that debuted in 1975.
- Enchanted Forest Express - A ridable miniature railway that offers views of parts of the park.
- Ferris Wheel - A classic Ferris wheel that fits up to two people per car.
- Flivver Cars - Kiddie cars that take guests around the back of the park.
- Helicopters - A helicopter ride where participants can choose how high they want to go.
- Paul Bunyan's Log Haul - A spinning coaster added in 2026.
- Rock-o-planes - A Ferris wheel with seats that flip upside down. On most of the cars guests can control the position.
- Round-up - A classic ride where guests stand inside a spinning wheel, and are pushed against the sides by centrifugal force, while the ride tilts.
- Scrambler
- Sky Ride - A chairlift that goes slowly across the park and back.
- Tilt-a-whirl

=== Former rides ===
Water rides

- Serengeti Surf Hill - A speedy race where performed on mats, where up to four participants race.
- Killermanjaro - A fast speed slide featuring a 280-foot (85 m) drop (consisting of a pre-drop and then a second drop) that reaches speeds near 30 mph (48 km/h).
- Wild Waters - Two 350-foot (110 m) waterslides that operated between 1984 and 2001 later replaced by The Shadow in 2002. This was the first and oldest water slide in the park.

== Calypso's Cove ==
Adjoining the park is Calypso's Cove, a small amusement park which includes an arcade, go-karts, rock climbing, mini-golf, batting cages, bumper boats, and a zip line.

== Campgrounds ==
Additionally, the park adjoins to campgrounds with classic cabins in Adirondack style, as well as RV accommodations. A pond with row and peddle boats, as well as several rec rooms and shower/restroom facilities are also included.

== Other information ==
In addition to the water and amusement rides, the park also has two daily circus shows (at noon and at 4 pm), a petting zoo, a small museum dedicated to the park, and multiple video game arcades and side show games throughout the park. The park has a no smoking policy, but areas are designated for those who wish to smoke. Dogs on leashes are allowed in the park.

The "White Arch" located in the parking lot was brought to Old Forge in 1967 and first placed at the park in 1968. It is one of eleven white arches that was originally used at the 1964 New York World's Fair.

The park also has an area in the back dedicated to circus performances such as acrobatics and animal shows.

== Incidents ==
- On September 14, 2013, a pair of volunteer fire fighters from the Sodus Point Volunteer Fire Department were arrested for breaking into the park off-season, stealing food, damaging arcade games, and an animated band, as well as defecating on the floor.
- On July 29, 2017, police received a report of a couple having sex in their pickup truck in the parking lot of Water Safari. When police arrived, 29-year-old Kristin Rogers attempted to flee the parking lot and assaulted an officer on apprehension; a 30-year-old male was apprehended without incident. Both were ticketed with public lewdness, while Rogers was additionally charged for resisting arrest, harassment, and disorderly conduct.
- On July 18, 2021, a 23-year old female suffered a fatal asthma attack leading to cardiac arrest after climbing an incline and riding a water slide.
