= Entertainment Centrum =

Entertainment Centrum is a type of entertainment complex in Canada developed by PenEquity. There are four Entertainment Centrums: the Oakville, Mississauga, Whitby, and Ottawa (Kanata) Entertainment Centrums. These plazas have movie theatres, fitness centres, and restaurants, among other attractions. Patrons park in a parking lot outside the Centrum, and walk into an outdoor open area. All four Centrums are anchored by Cineplex Cinemas or Landmark Cinemas multiplex cinema.

On June 27, 2013 Empire Theatres announced that it planned to sell the theatres at the two Centrums in Whitby and Kanata to Cineplex Entertainment, which would have rebranded them as Cineplex Cinemas. They were sold to Landmark Cinemas instead. On October 29, 2013, Empire Theatres closed its Whitby and Kanata locations. They reopened as Landmark Cinemas on October 31, 2013.

PenEquity also owns the 10 Dundas East project in Downtown Toronto.

== Mississauga Entertainment Centrum ==
The Mississauga Entertainment Centrum is a large regional shopping mall located at the southeast corner of Hurontario Street & Courtney Park Drive in Mississauga, Ontario. The plaza lies south of Ontario Highway 407 and North of Ontario Highway 401. Its anchor tenants are the Cineplex Odeon Cinema, Homewood Suites by Hilton and LA Fitness. Putting Edge Glow-in-the-Dark Mini Golf is also located in the plaza, along with several restaurants.

=== Restaurants ===
Restaurants in the Mississauga Entertainment Centrum include McDonald's, Wendy's, Subway (restaurant), Booster Juice, Moxies, Denny's, Boston Pizza, Montana's Cookhouse, Caffe Demetre, Swiss Chalet, Shoeless Joe's, Trattoria Italia Ristorante and Prince Sushi.

== Whitby Entertainment Centrum ==
The Whitby Entertainment Centrum (WEC) is located at 75 Consumers Drive in Whitby, Ontario, at the northwest corner of Highway 401 and Thickson Road. The plaza is the largest entertainment centre in the Whitby, Ajax, Oshawa, Durham Region with a great variety of 20 Entertainment/Restaurant and Fitness based venues. Its anchor tenant is the Landmark Cinemas and Goodlife Fitness. Putting Edge Glow-in-the-Dark Mini Golf is also located in the plaza, along with several restaurants.

=== Restaurants ===
Restaurants in the Whitby Entertainment Centrum include Lone Star Texas Grill, Wild Wing, Milestones, Montana's Cookhouse, Chuck E. Cheese's and Shoeless Joe's.

== Oakville Entertainment Centrum ==
The Oakville Entertainment Centrum is a large regional shopping mall located at the northwest corner of The Queen Elizabeth Way (QEW) & Winston Churchill Blvd. in Oakville, Ontario. Its anchor tenants are the Cineplex Odeon Cinema, Homewood Suites by Hilton and Dave & Buster's. The plaza contains entertainment venues, such as Putting Edge Glow-in-the-Dark Mini Golf and Cirqus Nightclub. It is also equipped with a spa, The Silvery Blue Butterfly.

=== Restaurants ===
Restaurants in the Oakville Entertainment Centrum include Boston Pizza, Scaddabush, Baton Rouge, Souvlaki Hut and Dirty Martini Lounge, Tratoria Timone, East Side Mario's, 3Brewers.
