= Hurricane Grill & Wings =

American restaurant chain

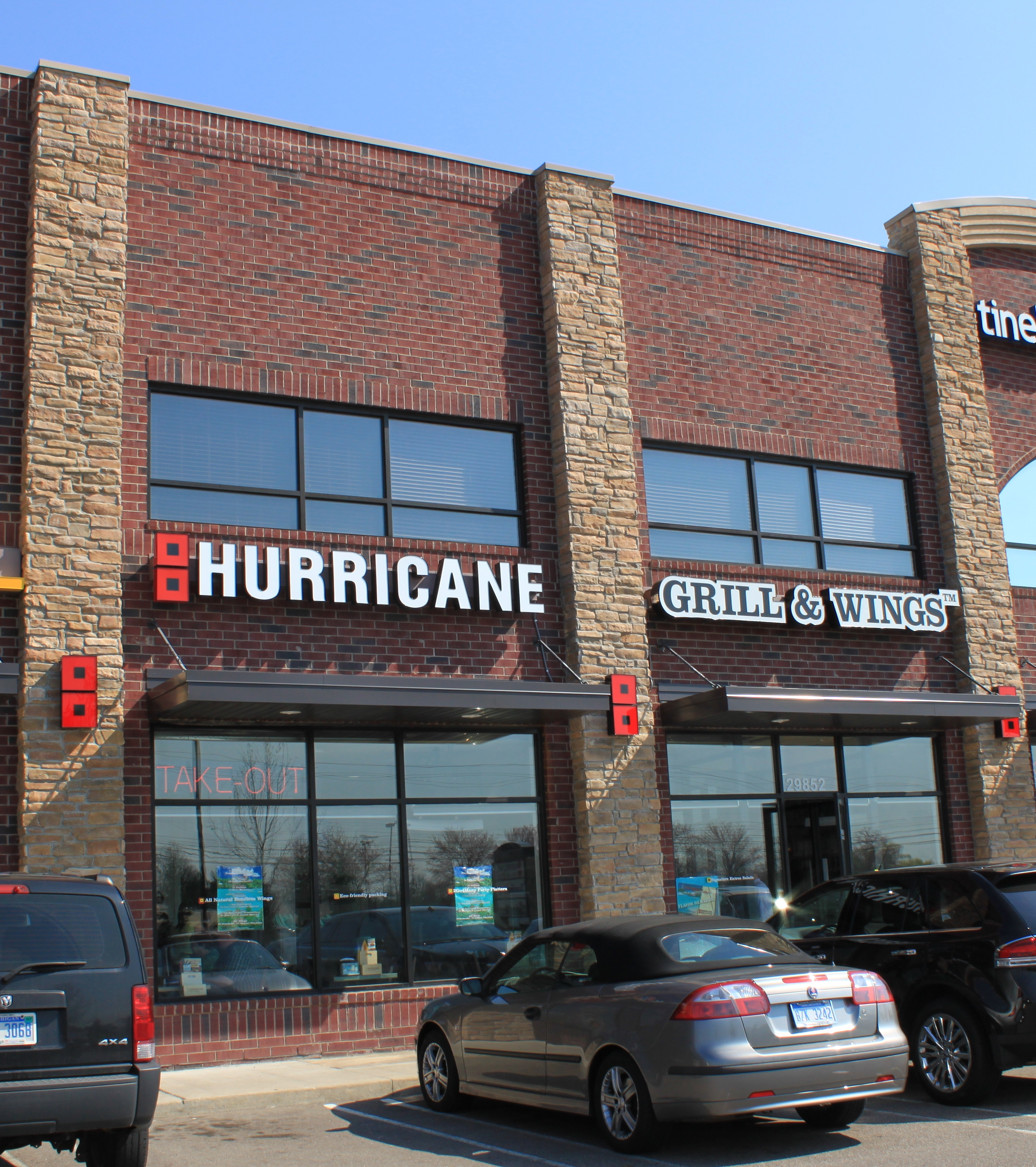
- Hurricane Grill & Wings, Southfield, Michigan
- Industry: Restaurant
- Founded: Fort Pierce, Florida 1995
- Headquarters: West Palm Beach, FL, U.S.
- Key people: John C. Metz (Chairman and CEO), Martin O'Dowd (President) Kevin Kruse (CDO) Mark Snyder (COO) Derek Kirk (CMO)
- Products: Wings, Signature sauces, Burgers/Sandwiches
- Owner: FBG Bid Co.
- Website: hurricanewings.com

Hurricane Grill & Wings is a restaurant chain based in Florida, and has a total of 71 locations in 15 U.S. states. The first Hurricane Grill & Wings was opened in Fort Pierce, Florida in 1995 and has opened more restaurants in Alabama, Arizona, Colorado, Georgia, Iowa, Maryland, Michigan, Minnesota, New York, North Carolina, and Texas.

== History ==
Hurricane Grill & Wings was first opened by Chris Russo in April 1995 in Ft. Pierce, Florida. By January 2008 there were 30 locations in Florida, Georgia, and Nevada, and had not long after being purchased by Fred Meltzer in 2008.

On December 17, 2008, the franchisor was purchased by Hurricane AMT, LLC, which is controlled by investor partners Gail Meyer Asarch and John C. Metz (Chairman and CEO).

Martin O'Dowd was appointed president of Hurricane AMT on September 2, 2009. O'Dowd had also been previously CEO of three other public restaurant companies, and has most recently served as president and CEO of Famous Dave's of America in Minneapolis, where he developed the organization from 18 units in the Midwest into an 84-unit national concept.

On June 13, 2016, Hurricane AMT opened its first Fast Casual Restaurant called Hurricane BTW or Hurricane Burgers-Tacos-Wings in Ft. Lauderdale. AMT planned to open another 24 BTW units in 2017.

On January 26, 2026, parent company FAT Brands filed for Chapter 11 bankruptcy protection in an effort to shed billions of dollars in debt. The company listed assets and liabilities between $1 billion and $10 billion. After receiving court approval for the sale of its assets, FBG Bid Co. officially acquired the remaining assets from FAT Brands for $595 million on June 18, 2026, including Hurricane Grill & Wings.
