= Extremeroller =

Roller coaster at Worlds of Fun

- Previously known as Screamroller, 1976–1982

Worlds of Fun
- Location: Worlds of Fun
- Park section: America
- Coordinates: 39°10′22″N 94°29′21″W
- Status: Removed
- Opening date: 1976; 49 years ago
- Closing date: 1988; 37 years ago
- Replaced by: Timber Wolf

General statistics
- Type: Steel
- Manufacturer: Arrow Dynamics
- Model: Corkscrew
- Height: 70 ft (21 m)
- Length: 1,250 ft (380 m)
- Speed: 50 mph (80 km/h)
- Inversions: 2
- Duration: 1:10
- Max vertical angle: 55°
- Capacity: 1,800 riders per hour
- Extremeroller at RCDB

Extremeroller was a steel stand-up roller coaster at Worlds of Fun in Kansas City, Missouri, US. It was built by Arrow Dynamics. It was built in 1976 under the name Screamroller. In 1983, Arrow designed a stand-up train for the attraction, which was subsequently renamed Extremeroller (also known as EXT), and was the first stand up coaster in the United States. However, the original sit-down trains were reinstalled in 1984, remaining in place until the attraction was removed in 1988 and replaced by Timber Wolf that opened in 1989. In 1990, Extremeroller was relocated to Formosa WonderWorld in Taipei, Taiwan, as "Spiral" which stood until the end of 2006 when it was removed.

The original station, entrance and a few concrete platforms from EXT still remain today (as commonly seen in the water and exit from station). American Coaster Enthusiasts (ACE) still has the stand-up train in storage.

== Incidents ==
- On May 18, 1976, Robbie M. Meyers, an 8-year-old boy, was struck and seriously injured by the Screamroller after entering a restricted area. In 1977, Meyers was awarded $1.39 million (equivalent to $7.21 million in 2024) in a lawsuit finding Mid-America Enterprises responsible for his injuries. Worlds of Fun did not appeal the decision.
