= Zamperla =

Italian-based steel coaster and flat rides manufacturer

Antonio Zamperla S.p.A.
- Type: Private
- Industry: Manufacturing
- Founded: 1966
- Headquarters: Vicenza, Veneto, Italy
- Key people: Antonio Zamperla (founder) Alberto Zamperla (president) Antonio JR Zamperla (CEO)
- Products: Amusement park rides
- Revenue: 120 Mio. EUR (2019)
- Number of employees: 450 (2012)
- Subsidiaries: Zamperla Asia Pacific Inc Zamperla Middle East; Zamperla Slovakia Sro; Ao Antonio Zamperla Spa; Rides Factory Shanghai Bellaridez Srl
- Website: Official website

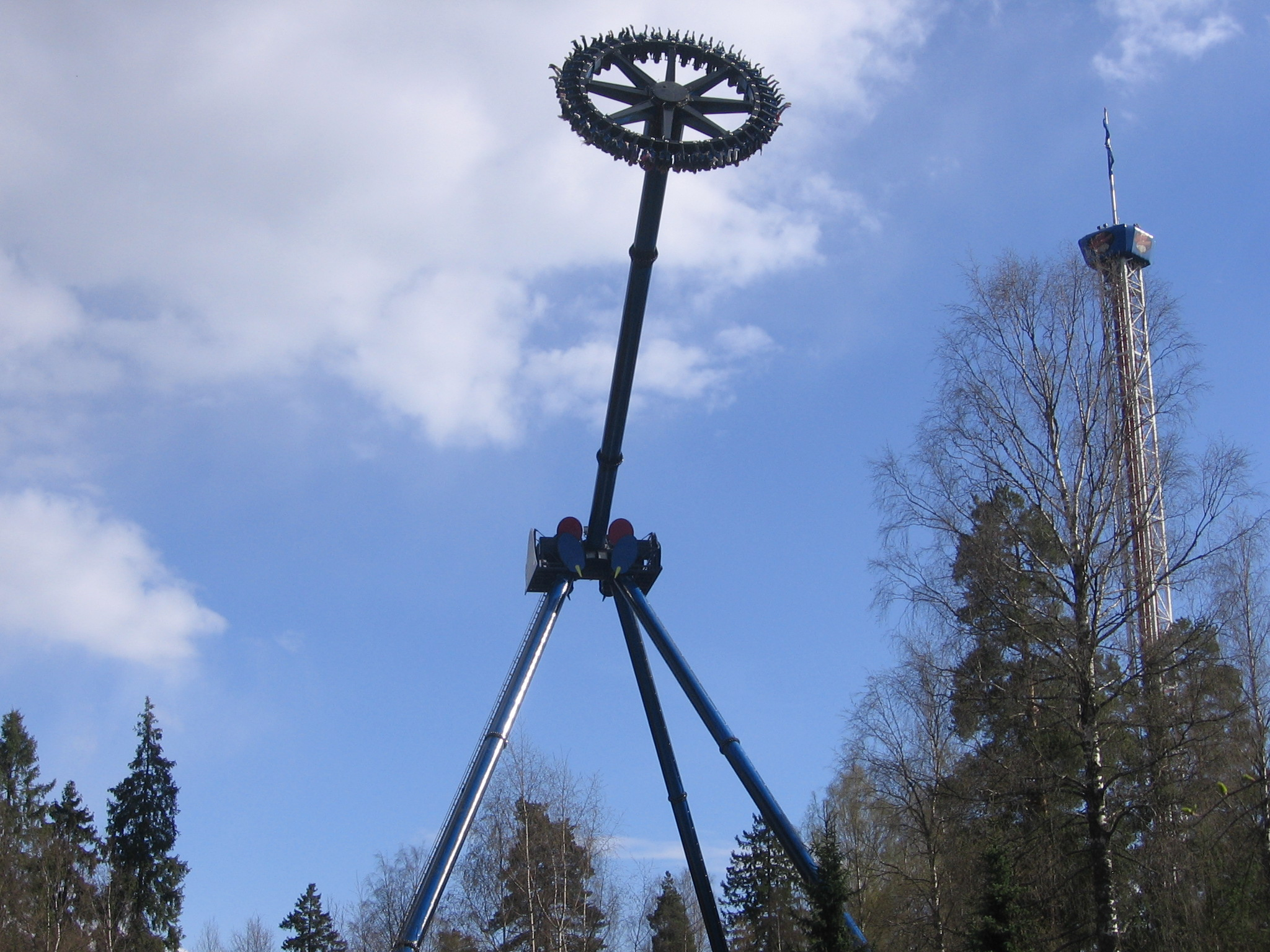
SpinSpider (operated since 2009) one giant frisbee from Zamperla (Giant Discovery) at TusenFryd, Norway.

Video of Lilla Lots at Liseberg, Gothenburg, Sweden. Lilla Lots is a version of Rockin' Tug.

Antonio Zamperla S.p.A. is an Italian design and manufacturing company founded in 1966. It is best known for creating family rides, thrill rides and roller coasters worldwide. The company also makes smaller coin-operated rides commonly found inside shopping malls.

Zamperla builds roller coasters, like the powered Dragon Coaster, Mini Mouse, Zig Zag, and Volare. In 2006, Zamperla announced Motocoaster, a motorcycle-themed roller coaster. Rights to some of S.D.C.'s rides were handed to Zamperla (along with S&C and S&MC) after the company went bankrupt in 1993.

In 2005, the founder of the company, Mr. Antonio Zamperla, became the first Italian to be inducted into the International Association of Amusement Parks and Attractions (IAAPA) Hall of Fame by virtue of his significant contribution to the entire industry, joining other pioneers such as Walt Disney, George Ferris and Walter Knott.

Unlike companies such as Intamin, Vekoma, or Bolliger & Mabillard that concentrate on larger and faster roller coasters, Zamperla focuses on more family-friendly roller coasters that can be easily mass-produced, taken down, and transported to different locations. They are also a major manufacturer of flat rides with such names as: Balloon Race, Bumper cars, Disk'O, Ferris wheel, Water Flume Ride, Galleon/Swinging Ship, Sky Drop, Discovery, Windshear, Tornado, Energy Storm, Z-Force, Mixer, Rotoshake, Turbo Force, Power Surge, Mini Jet, and Air Race.

== Company structure ==
The company is organized in different departments, the Art Department that works on the study and creation of different themes of the rides, the Technical Department that designs the engineering of the attractions, the Production Department that handles their realization, the Sales Department, the Customer Care and the Park Development Department that works on the design and creation of an amusement park.

== Projects ==
In 2010 Antonio Zamperla S.p.A. and Central Amusement International (CAI), managed by Alessandro Zamperla, a grandson of Antonio Zamperla and Alberto Zamperla, restored and renovated the Coney Island area in New York City. The company managed Coney Island's Luna Park and installed only Zamperla rides.

From 2003 to 2019, Zamperla transformed the Trump Organization's Wollman Rink, within New York City's Central Park, into Victorian Gardens, a traditional-style amusement park with rides like the "Family Swinger", "Samba Balloon", "Aeromax", "Convoy", "Rocking Tug", "Kite Flyer". The park closed in 2021 due to the COVID-19 pandemic.

Another famous Zamperla project is Kernwasser, north of Düsseldorf, a former nuclear power station that was turned into an amusement park called Wunderland Kalkar.

In August 2023, it was announced that Zamperla was hired to redesign the former Top Thrill Dragster roller coaster at Cedar Point in Sandusky, Ohio, renamed Top Thrill 2, which opened to the public on Saturday, May 4th, 2024, as the tallest and fastest triple-launch coaster in the world, with a vertical spike and top hat both reaching 420 feet and a top speed of 120 miles per hour. The ride starts with a 74-mile per hour forward launch up the top hat hill, before rolling backward into a 101-mile per hour reverse launch into a 420-foot 90-degree spike, followed by a 120-mile per hour launch up and over the top hat. The coaster was quickly shut down for design modifications and did not reopen in the 2024 season. After months of testing and further modifications, it reopened for the 2025 season.

== Gallery ==
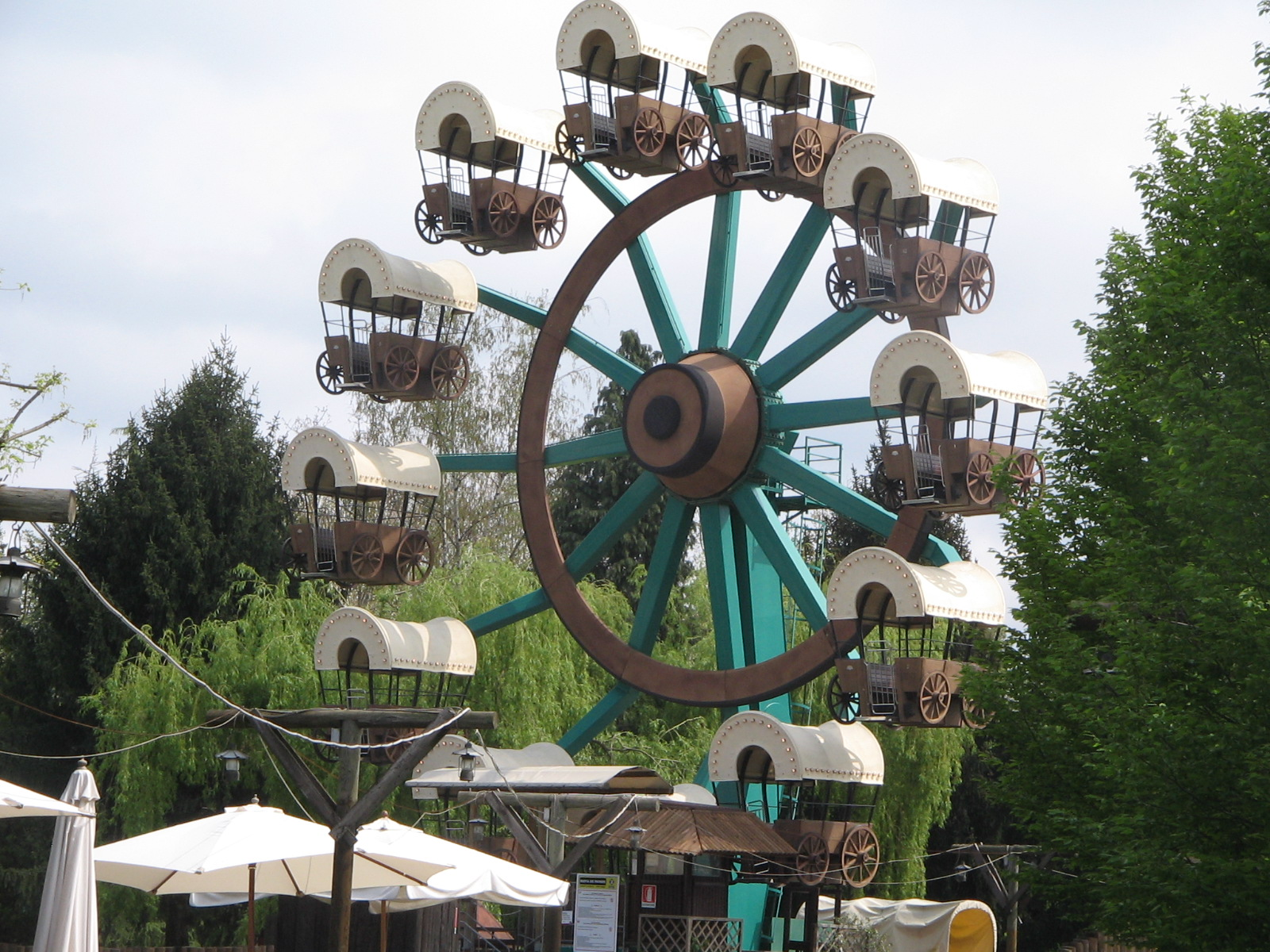
Ruota dei Pionieri, Minitalia Leolandia Park, Province of Bergamo, Lombardy, Italy

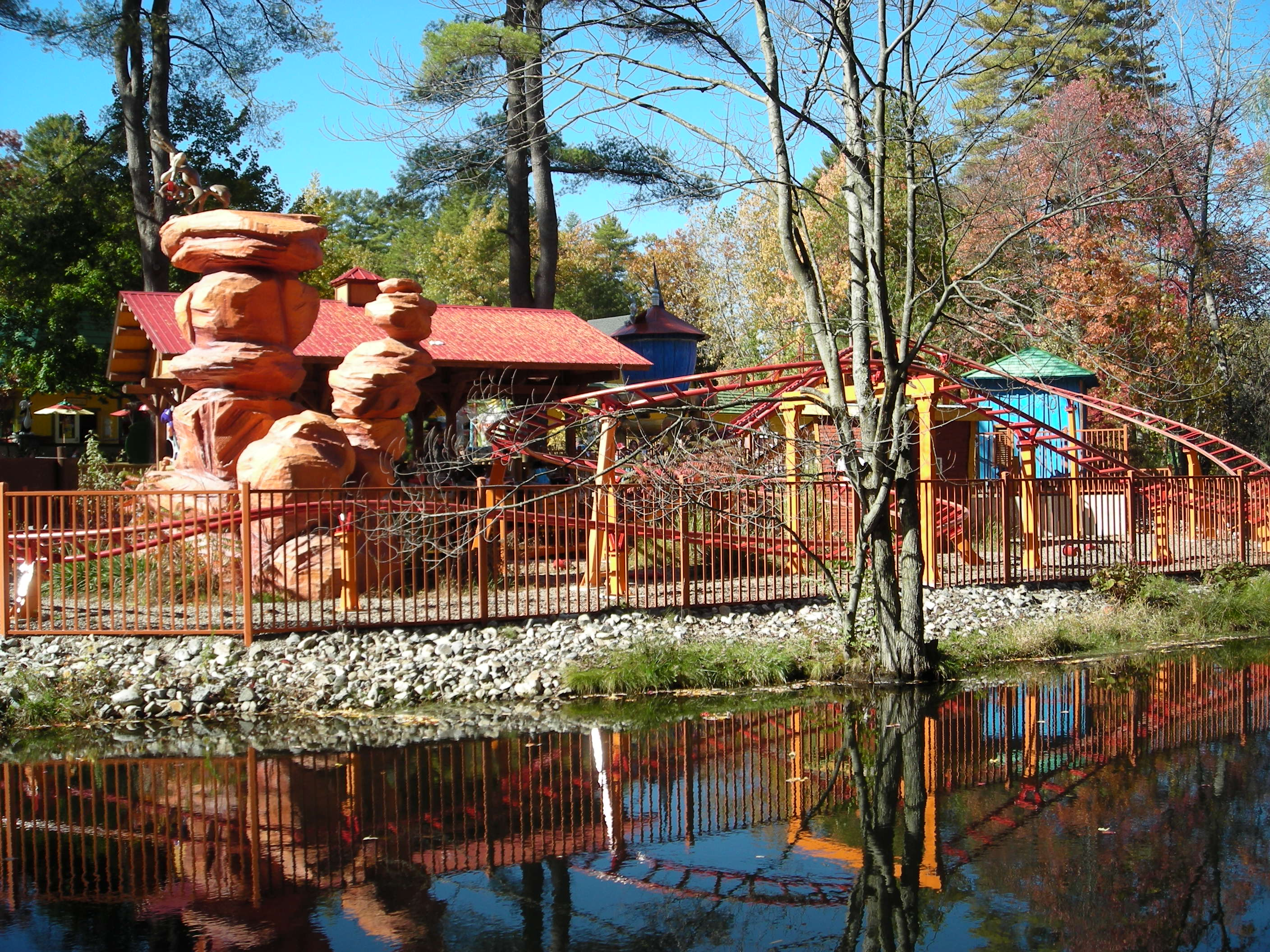
Frankie's Mine Train, a kiddie coaster at The Great Escape

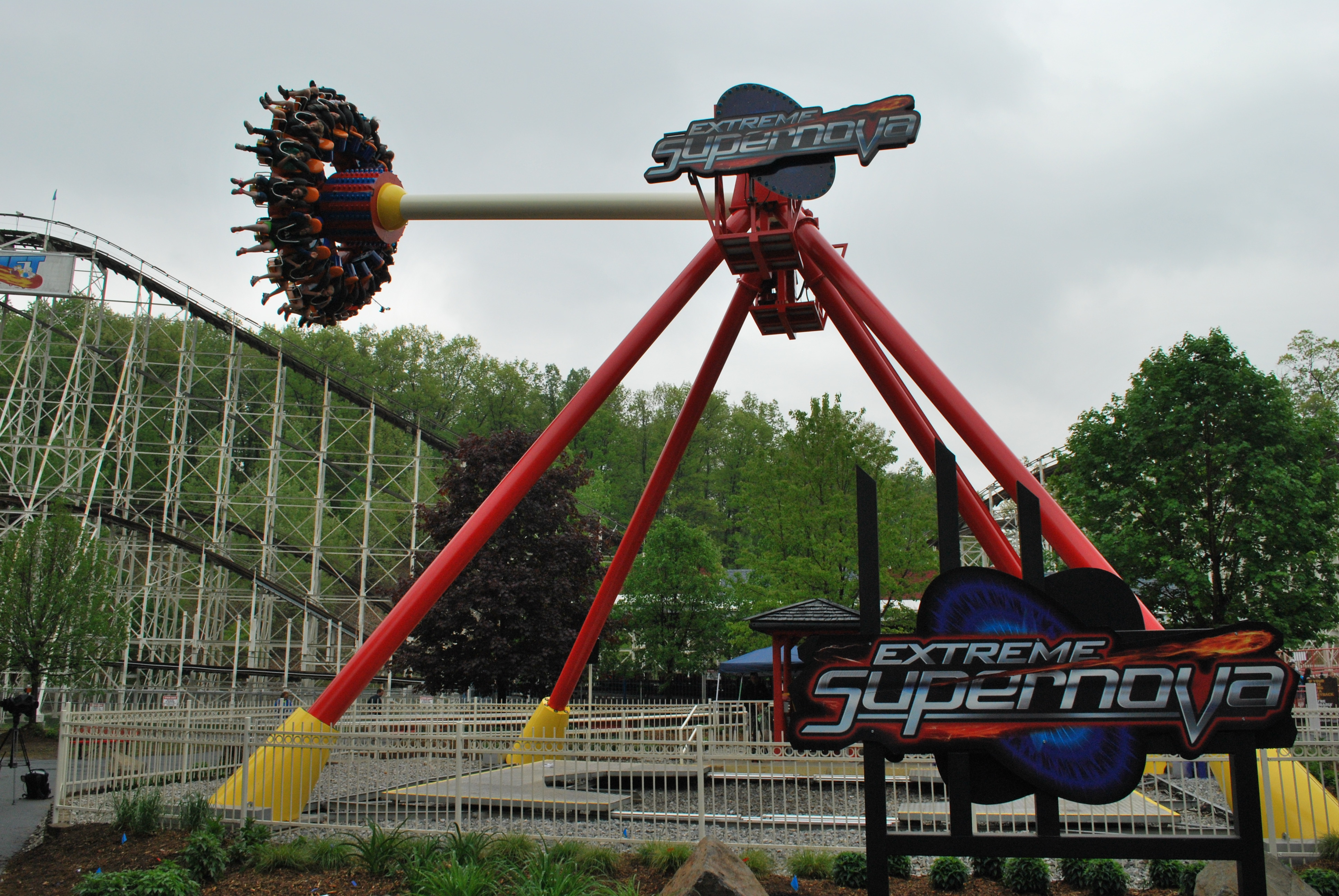
The Extreme Supernova is a relocated Zamperla Midi Discovery that was installed at The Great Escape

== List of roller coasters ==
As of 2022, Zamperla has built 368 roller coasters around the world.

Name	Model	Park	Country	Opened	Status	Ref
Unknown	Galaxy / Large	Beto Carrero World	Brazil	Unknown	Removed	
Forest Express	Wild Mouse / Mini Mouse	Paul Bunyan's Adventure Golf	United States	Unknown	Removed	
Tornado	Powered Coaster / Single Helix	Jenkinson's Boardwalk	United States	Unknown	Removed	
Hello Kitty Angel Coaster	Powered Coaster / Single Helix	Lina World	Japan	Unknown	Operating	
Rodeo Ride; Formerly Drachen Bahn	Powered Coaster / Single Helix	Taunus Wunderland	Germany	Unknown	Removed	
Dragon	Powered Coaster / Single Helix	Gardaland	Italy	Unknown	Removed	
Dragon	Powered Coaster / Single Helix	Lake George Action Park	United States	Unknown	Removed	
Tornado	Powered Coaster / Twin Helix	Dowdy's	United States	Unknown	Removed	
Dragon	Powered Coaster / Twin Helix	Amusement Land	South Korea	Unknown	Removed	
Tornado	Powered Coaster / Tornado	Castle Amusement Park	United States	Unknown	Removed	
Rudicoaster	Powered Coaster / Custom	Santa's Land	United States	Unknown	Operating	
Mini Roller Coaster	Powered Coaster / Dragon	Mariepark	Finland	Unknown	Removed	
Dragon	Powered Coaster / Dragon	Dreamland	South Korea	Unknown	Removed	
Dragon	Powered Coaster / Dragon	Festivalgate	Japan	Unknown	Removed	
Roller Coaster	Powered Coaster / Dragon	Appu Ghar	India	Unknown	Removed	
Dragon Coaster Ride	Powered Coaster / Dragon	Magic World Kid's Park	United States	Unknown	Removed	
Dragon	Powered Coaster / Dragon	Fantasy Island	United States	Unknown	Removed	
Dragon	Powered Coaster / Dragon	Lai Chi Kok Amusement Park	China	Unknown	Removed	
Ridgeline Racer	Powered Coaster / Custom	American Adventure	United States	Unknown	Removed	
Creature Coaster	Powered Coaster / Custom	Funtastic Park	Guam (United States)	Unknown	Operating	
Virtual Express; Formerly Tibidabo Express	Powered Coaster / Custom	Tibidabo	Spain	Unknown	Operating	
Dragon Coaster	Unknown	Playland	Canada	Unknown	Removed	
Dragon	Powered Coaster / Single Helix	Midway Park	United States	1984	Removed	
Dragon	Powered Coaster / Dragon	Gulf Shores Amusement Park	United States	1984	Removed	
Dragon	Powered Coaster / Dragon	Kings Castle Land	United States	1984	Removed	
Dragon	Powered Coaster / Dragon	Jolly Roger Amusement Park	United States	1985	Removed	
Dragon	Powered Coaster / Dragon	Boardwalk and Baseball	United States	1985	Removed	
Rudolph's Sleigh Ride Roller Coaster	Powered Coaster / Custom	Santa's Village	Canada	1985	Removed	
Dragon	Powered Coaster / Single Helix	Fantasy Island	United States	1986	Removed	
Dracor	Powered Coaster / Dragon	Santa's Village AZoosment Park	United States	1986	Removed	
Dragon Coaster	Powered Coaster / Twin Helix	Everland	South Korea	1987	Operating	
Horror Express; Formerly Tornado	Powered Coaster / Tornado	Starlight Express	Malaysia	1987	Removed	
Jormungandr; Formerly Buffalo Mountain Coaster	Powered Coaster / Buffalo Coaster	Drayton Manor	United Kingdom	1987	Operating	
Unknown	Powered Coaster / Custom	Tops	Australia	1988	Removed	
Dragon	Powered Coaster / Twin Helix	Lakeside Amusement Park	United States	1989	Closed	
Dragon	Powered Coaster / Dragon	Santa Present Park	Japan	1989	Removed	
Dragon	Powered Coaster / Single Helix	TusenFryd	Norway	1990	Removed	
Dragon	Powered Coaster / Single Helix	Butlins Minehead Resort	United Kingdom	1990	Removed	
Dragon	Powered Coaster / Single Helix	Loudoun Castle	United Kingdom	1990	Removed	
Mini Montanha Russa	Powered Coaster / Single Helix	Play Master	Brazil	1990	Operating	
Búfalo	Powered Coaster / Single Helix	Parque Shanghai	Brazil	1990	Operating	&
Dragão	Powered Coaster / Twin Helix	Parque Shanghai	Brazil	1990	Operating	&
Dragon Coaster; Formerly Speedy Train Game	Powered Coaster / Twin Helix	Saqr Public Park	United Arab Emirates	1990	Operating	
Tobot Train; Formerly Rudolph 2 Loop Coaster	Powered Coaster / Twin Helix	Seoul Land	South Korea	1990	Operating	
Dragon Ride	Powered Coaster / Dragon	Flambards Village Theme Park	United Kingdom	1990	Removed	
Dragon	Powered Coaster / Twin Helix	Canobie Lake Park; Deno's Wonder Wheel Amusement Park	United States	1991; Unknown	Operating	
Dragon	Powered Coaster / Twin Helix	Gaya Land	South Korea	1991	Operating	
Dragon 2 Loop Coaster	Powered Coaster / Twin Helix	Gyeongju World	South Korea	1991	Operating	
Quantum Leap	Powered Coaster / Tornado	Glico's	Philippines	1991	Removed	
Jazz Junction	Powered Coaster / Custom	Dazzleland	Australia	1991	Removed	
Whirlarama	Powered Coaster / Dragon	Exhilarama	United States	1992	Removed	
Dragon	Powered Coaster / Dragon	Playland Salvador	Brazil	1993	Operating	
Roller Coaster	Powered Coaster / Single Helix	Fun World	India	1994	Removed	
Hurlarama	Powered Coaster / Dragon	Prehistoric Park	United States	1994	Removed	
Runaway Mine Train	Powered Coaster / Mine Train Coaster	Miner Mike's Adventure Town	United States	1994	Operating	
Toronto Island Monster	Powered Coaster / Twin Helix	Centreville Amusement Park	Canada	1995	Removed	
Buffalo Bill Coaster	Powered Coaster / Custom	Sunway Lagoon	Malaysia	1995	Removed	
Back at the Barnyard Hayride; Formerly Li’l Shaver	Powered Coaster / Mini Mine Coaster	Nickelodeon Universe inside the Mall of America	United States	1995	Operating	
Achterbahn	Powered Coaster / Custom	Wunderland Kalkar	Germany	1995	Operating	
Dragón	Powered Coaster / Single Helix	Neverland Park	Argentina	1996	Operating	
Dragon	Powered Coaster / Dragon	Tir Prince Family Funfair	United Kingdom	1996	Removed	
Euro Express; Formerly Space Odyssey 2020	Powered Coaster / Custom	First World Indoor Theme Park	Malaysia	1996	Removed	
Kiddie Coaster	Powered Coaster / Single Helix	Wild Waves Theme & Water Park	United States	1997	Operating	
Dragon	Powered Coaster / Single Helix	Nasu Highland Park	Japan	1997	Removed	
Tornado	Powered Coaster / Twin Helix	Dennlys Parc	France	1997	Removed	
Buffalo Coaster	Powered Coaster / Twin Helix	Zoomarine	Portugal	1997	Operating	&
Dragon	Powered Coaster / Dragon	Kijima Kogen	Japan	1997	Operating	
Roller Coaster	Powered Coaster / Mine Train Coaster	Neverland Park	Argentina	1997	Operating	
Doo Wopper	Wild Mouse / Zig Zag Coaster	Morey's Piers	United States	1998	Operating	&
Dragon Coaster	Powered Coaster / Single Helix	Karuizawa Toy Kingdom	Japan	1998	Operating	
Piuí	Powered Coaster / Twin Helix	Terra Encantada	Brazil	1998	Removed	
Tiny Toot	Powered Coaster / Mine Train Coaster	Silverwood Theme Park	United States	1998	Operating	
Montaña Rusa	Powered Coaster / Twin Helix	Neverland Park	Argentina	1998	Operating	
Flying Dragon	Powered Coaster / Custom	First World Indoor Theme Park	Malaysia	1998	Removed	
Dragao	Powered Coaster / Custom	Walter World	Brazil	1998	Operating	
Dragon Coaster	Powered Coaster / Custom	Hollywood Connection	United States	1998	Removed	
Great Chase	Family Gravity Coaster 80STD	Six Flags America	United States	1999	Operating	
Roadrunner Express	Family Gravity Coaster 80STD	Six Flags Discovery Kingdom	United States	1999	Operating	
The Howler	Family Gravity Coaster 80STD	Holiday World	United States	1999	Operating	
Dragon Coaster	Powered Coaster / Single Helix	Obihiro Zoo	Japan	1999	Removed	
Bat Hatari: Perseguição em Gotham City; Formerly Buffalo Bill	Powered Coaster / Twin Helix	Hopi Hari; American Park (Brazil)	Brazil	1999; 1997 to 1999	Operating	
Wild West Mine Train	Unknown	Ocean Park Hong Kong	Hong Kong	1999	Closed	
Woodstock’s Express	Family Gravity Coaster 80STD	Dorney Park	United States	2000	Operating	
Family Coaster	Family Gravity Coaster 80STD	Escape Theme Park	Singapore	2000	Removed	
Tren Bravo	Powered Coaster / Buffalo Coaster	Terra Mítica	Spain	2000	Removed	&
Unknown	Powered Coaster / Mine Train Coaster	Neverland Park	Argentina	2000	Removed	
Dragon Coaster	Powered Coaster / Custom	Sinbad's Wonderland	Pakistan	2000	Operating	
Alucinakis	Unknown	Terra Mítica	Spain	2000	Operating	
Unknown	Powered Coaster / Twin Helix	Funcity Karachi	Pakistan	2000	Operating	
Family Flyer	Family Gravity Coaster 80STD	Playland Park	United States	2001	Operating	
Silly Serpent; Formerly Dragon	Powered Coaster / Single Helix	Luna Park	Australia	2001	Removed	
Dragon	Powered Coaster / Single Helix	Sendai Highland	Japan	2001	Removed	
Dragon	Powered Coaster / Twin Helix	Lagolandia	Italy	2001	Operating	
Roller Coaster	Powered Coaster / Dragon	Accoland	India	2001	Removed	
Klondike Gold Rusher	Wild Mouse / Zig Zag Coaster	Wild Waves Theme & Water Park	United States	2002	Operating	
Scratch; Formerly Zig Zag	Wild Mouse / Zig Zag Coaster	Walibi Sud-Ouest	France	2002	Operating	
Woodstock Express; Formerly Scratch; Formerly Zig Zag	Wild Mouse / Zig Zag Coaster	Walibi Rhône-Alpes	France	2002	Operating	
Twister Coaster	Wild Mouse / Twister Coaster 420STD	Basrah Land	Iraq	2002	Operating	
Runaway Train	Family Gravity Coaster 80STD	Gulliver's Milton Keynes	United Kingdom	2002	Operating	
Teletren	Family Gravity Coaster 80STD	Parque Diversiones	Costa Rica	2002	Operating	
Mina	Family Gravity Coaster 80STD	Parque de Atracciones de Zaragoza	Spain	2002	Operating	
Dragon	Powered Coaster / Single Helix	Playland Family Aricanduva	Brazil	2002	Operating	
Jet Coaster	Powered Coaster / Single Helix	Jawa Timur Park 1	Indonesia	2002	Operating	
Dragon Coaster	Powered Coaster / Single Helix	Misaki Park	Japan	2002	Removed	
Run-A-Way Train	Powered Coaster / Single Helix	Splash Kingdom Waterpark	United States	2002	Removed	
Dragon Coaster	Powered Coaster / Twin Helix	Symonds Yat Leisure Park	United Kingdom	2002	Removed	
Dragon	Powered Coaster / Dragon	Uncle Bernie's Theme Park	United States	2002	Operating	
Dragon	Powered Coaster / Dragon	Luna Park	Lebanon	2002	Removed	
Dragon	Powered Coaster / Dragon	Gero Land	Egypt	2002	Operating	
KuKu Coaster	Powered Coaster / Dragon	Janfusun Fancyworld	Taiwan	2002	Operating	
Kukulcan; Formerly Quantum Leap	Powered Coaster / Custom	Adventureland	United Arab Emirates	2002	Operating	
Forest Train; Formerly Adventure Train	Powered Coaster / Custom	Adventureland	United Arab Emirates	2002	Operating	
Tornado	Powered Coaster / Custom	Speelstad Oranje	Netherlands	2002	Removed	
Sky Train	Powered Coaster / Custom	Sky Fantasia	China	2002	Closed	
Toboggan Nordique	Wild Mouse / Zig Zag Coaster	La Ronde	Canada	2003	Operating	
Crazy Mouse	Wild Mouse / Zig Zag Coaster	Playland Park	United States	2003	Operating	
Dragon Express	Family Gravity Coaster 80STD	Adventure World	Australia	2003	Operating	
Family Coaster	Family Gravity Coaster 80STD	Expoland	Japan	2003	Removed	
Family Coaster	Family Gravity Coaster 80STD	Mother Farm	Japan	2003	Operating	
Fiesta Express	Wild Mouse / Mini Mouse	Fun Fore All Family Entertainment Center	United States	2003	Operating	
Dragon	Powered Coaster / Single Helix	Riverfront Park	United States	2003	Removed	
Dragon	Powered Coaster / Single Helix	Play Land	Kuwait	2003	Removed	
Dragon	Powered Coaster / Twin Helix	Mundo Petapa	Guatemala	2003	Operating	
Montaña Rusa	Powered Coaster / Twin Helix	Diverxity	Venezuela	2003	Operating	
Unknown	Powered Coaster / Dragon	Future Kid	Kuwait	2003	Removed	
Jungle Flying; Formerly Space Adventure	Unknown	Suzhou Amusement Land	China	2003	Removed	
Segreti Della Terra	Unknown	Felifonte	Italy	2003	Removed	
Volare	Volare / Custom	Wiener Prater	Austria	2004	Operating	
Super Flight	Volare / Standard	Playland Park	United States	2004	Closed	
Time Warp; Formerly Tomb Raider: The Ride	Volare / Standard	Canada's Wonderland	Canada	2004	removed	
Diving Coaster	Wild Mouse / Zig Zag Coaster Custom	Me World	South Korea	2004	Removed	
Mini Mouse Cartoon	Wild Mouse / Mini Mouse	Parc Saint Paul	France	2004	Operating	
Family Train	Family Gravity Coaster 80STD	Hawally Park	Kuwait	2004	Operating	
Hello Kitty Angel Coaster	Powered Coaster / Single Helix	Harmonyland	Japan	2004	Operating	
Hello Kitty Angel Coaster	Powered Coaster / Single Helix	Seibuen Yuenchi	Japan	2004	Operating	
Animal Coaster	Powered Coaster / Single Helix	Toyama Family Park	Japan	2004	Operating	
Space Mountain	Powered Coaster / Single Helix	Mampato	Chile	2004	Operating	
Unknown	Powered Coaster / Single Helix	Happy Land Entertainment	Saudi Arabia	2004	Operating	
Dragón; Formerly Dragon	Powered Coaster / Twin Helix	Valle Fantástico; La Feria Chapultepec Magico	Mexico	2004; Unknown	Removed	
Montaña Dragón	Powered Coaster / Twin Helix	Fantasilandia	Chile	2004	Operating	
Dragon Coaster	Powered Coaster / Dragon	Tojoko Toy Kingdom	Japan	2004	Removed	
Tren Búfalo	Powered Coaster / Mine Train Coaster	Puerto Aventura; Parque Hollywood	Chile	2004; Unknown	Operating	
Mine Train	Powered Coaster / Custom	Jinhae Parkland	South Korea	2004	Removed	
Trombi	Volare / Standard	Särkänniemi Amusement Park	Finland	2005	Closed	
Wild Mouse	Wild Mouse / Twister Coaster 420STD	Beech Bend	United States	2005	Operating	
Twister Coaster	Wild Mouse / Twister Coaster 420STD	Gorky Park	Russia	2005	Removed	
Frankie’s Mine Train; Formerly Road Runner Express	Family Gravity Coaster 80STD	Great Escape	United States	2005	Operating	
Mini Montaña	Family Gravity Coaster 80STD	VulQano Park	Ecuador	2005	Operating	
Unknown	Family Gravity Coaster 80STD	Druzhby Park	Russia	2005	Operating	
Dragão; Formerly Dragon	Powered Coaster / Single Helix	Mirabilandia; Playland Eldorado	Brazil	2005; Unknown	Operating	
Jet Coaster	Powered Coaster / Single Helix	Wisata Bahari Lamongan	Indonesia	2005	Operating	
Dragon Coaster	Powered Coaster / Single Helix	New Brighton Funfair	United Kingdom	2005	Removed	
Dragon Coaster	Powered Coaster / Single Helix	Mori no Yuenchi	Japan	2005	Operating	
Roller Coaster	Powered Coaster / Twin Helix	Taman Safari Indonesia	Indonesia	2005	Operating	
Dragon	Powered Coaster / Twin Helix	Woncheon Greenland	South Korea	2005	Removed	
Dragon Coaster	Powered Coaster / Dragon	Silver Storm Water Theme Park	India	2005	Removed	
Dragon	Powered Coaster / Dragon	Trans Amusement Park	Nigeria	2005	Operating	
Dragon	Powered Coaster / Custom	Woncheon Lake Land	South Korea	2005	Removed	
Karst Cave Coaster	Powered Coaster / Custom	Jin Jiang Action Park; Callan Activity Center	China	2005; Unknown	Operating	
Twister: Fury in the Sky	Unknown	PokéPark	Japan	2005	Removed	
Tyfonen	Wild Mouse / Twister Coaster 420STD	Tivoli Friheden	Denmark	2006	Operating	
Opa	Wild Mouse / Twister Coaster 420STD	Mt. Olympus Water & Theme Park	United States	2006	Removed	
Wild Mouse	Wild Mouse / Twister Coaster 420STD	Fantasilandia	Chile	2006	Operating	
Runaway Train	Wild Mouse / Mini Mouse	Gulliver's Warrington	United Kingdom	2006	Operating	&
Grand Exposition Coaster	Family Gravity Coaster 80STD	Silver Dollar City	United States	2006	Operating	
Family Gravity Coaster	Family Gravity Coaster 80STD	Chimelong Paradise	China	2006	Removed	
Achterbahn	Family Gravity Coaster 80STD	Nordsee Spielstadt Wangerland	Germany	2006	Operating	
Air Pogo	Air Force / 5	Adventure Island	India	2006	Operating	
Sea Dragon Coaster	Powered Coaster / Single Helix	Minamichita Beach Land & Minamichita Toy Kingdom	Japan	2006	Removed	
Dragon	Powered Coaster / Single Helix	Parks and Games	Brazil	2006	Operating	
Dragon Train	Powered Coaster / Twin Helix	Pago Land	South Korea	2006	Operating	
Dragon Coaster	Powered Coaster / Dragon	Vertical Endeavors; Santa's Village AZoosment Park	United States	2006; 1995 to 2005	Removed	
Dragon	Powered Coaster / Dragon	HotZone	Brazil	2006	Removed	
Dragon Coaster	Powered Coaster / Dragon	Kuwait Magic	Kuwait	2006	Removed	
Super Train	Powered Coaster / Custom	Water Garden Salmaniya	Bahrain	2006	Removed	
Une Souris Verte	Wild Mouse / Twister Coaster 420STD	Parc Saint Paul	France	2007	Operating	
Wild Mouse	Wild Mouse / Twister Coaster Compact	Leisureland	(Republic of Ireland) Ireland	2007	Removed	
Mine Train	Family Gravity Coaster 80STD	PowerLand	Finland	2007	Operating	
Berg- og dalbane	Family Gravity Coaster 80STD	Lilleputthammer	Norway	2007	Operating	
Runaway Mine Train; Formerly Mini Mine Rush; Formerly Runaway Train	Family Gravity Coaster 80STD	Flamingo Land; American Adventure Theme Park; Gulliver's Warrington	United Kingdom	2007; 2006; 2004 to 2005	Operating	
Leocoaster	Family Gravity Coaster 80STD	Leolandia	Italy	2007	Removed	
Paw Patrol; Formerly Vagones Locos	Family Gravity Coaster 80STD	Parque de Atracciones de Madrid	Spain	2007	Operating	
Padrinos Voladores; Formerly Turbulencia	Air Force / 5	Parque de Atracciones de Madrid	Spain	2007	Operating	
Unknown	Powered Coaster / Single Helix	Parku 7 Xhuxhat	Albania	2007	Operating	
Dragón	Powered Coaster / Single Helix	Plaza de Juegos	Argentina	2007	Removed	
Dragon	Powered Coaster / Single Helix	Prince Mohammad Bin Fahd Amusement Park	Saudi Arabia	2007	Removed	
Dragon	Powered Coaster / Twin Helix	Anniversary Park	Russia	2007	Operating	
Dragon	Powered Coaster / Twin Helix	Luna Park	Turkey	2007	Operating	
Fire Dragon	Powered Coaster / Twin Helix	Nanhu Amusement Park	China	2007	Removed	
Blackhole Coaster	Powered Coaster / Custom	Greenland	Japan	2007	Operating	
Buffalo Stampede; Formerly Buffalo Ride	Powered Coaster / Custom	Twinlakes Park; American Adventure Theme Park	United Kingdom	2007; 1987 to 2006	Operating	
Moto Coaster; Formerly Orange County Choppers MotoCoaster	MotoCoaster 364m	Six Flags Darien Lake	United States	2008	Operating	
Pony Express	MotoCoaster	Knott's Berry Farm	United States	2008	Operating	
Twister Coaster	Wild Mouse / Twister Coaster 420STD	Bostanci Luna Park	Turkey	2008	Operating	
Twister Coaster	Wild Mouse / Twister Coaster 420STD	Aktur Park	Turkey	2008	Operating	
Wild Mouse	Wild Mouse / Twister Coaster 420STD	Luna Park Mamaia	Romania	2008	Operating	
Twister Mountain	Wild Mouse / Twister Coaster Compact	Leolandia	Italy	2008	Operating	
Unknown	Powered Coaster / Single Helix	Neverland Park	Argentina	2008	Operating	
Comet Coaster	Powered Coaster / Single Helix	Magic Galaxy	Egypt	2008	Operating	
Roller Coaster	Powered Coaster / Single Helix	Athisayam	India	2008	Operating	
Twin Spiral Dragon Coaster; Formerly Dragon	Powered Coaster / Twin Helix	Knightly's Funfair; Butlins	United Kingdom	2008; 2001 to 2005	Operating	
Black Hole Odyssey	Powered Coaster / Twin Helix	Danga Bay Theme Park	Malaysia	2008	Operating	
Rush-Coaster; Formerly Gold Mine Express; Formerly Tornado	Powered Coaster / Twin Helix	Seven Peaks Fun Center; Schnepf Farms; BigShot Amusement Park	United States	2008; 2004 to 2005; Unknown	Operating	
Dragon Super Carousel	Powered Coaster / Twin Helix	International Luna Park	Greece	2008	Removed	
Moto Coaster	MotoCoaster 364m	Jin Jiang Action Park	China	2009	Operating	
Crazy Elves; Formerly Spinning Coaster	Wild Mouse / Twister Coaster 420STD	Happy Valley Shanghai	China	2009	Operating	
Twister Coaster	Wild Mouse / Twister Coaster 420STD	Park Lunasan	Turkey	2009	Operating	
Spaccatempo	Wild Mouse / Twister Coaster Compact	Miragica	Italy	2009	Removed	
Twister Mountain	Wild Mouse / Twister Coaster Compact	Hili Fun City	United Arab Emirates	2009	Operating	
Fiesta Express	Wild Mouse / Mini Mouse	Sould Park	Spain	2009	Operating	
Rakevet Harim Leyladim	Family Gravity Coaster 80STD	Superland	Israel	2009	Operating	
Family Coaster	Family Gravity Coaster 80STD	Sea Train Land	Japan	2009	Operating	
Familie Achtbaan	Family Gravity Coaster 80STD	Familiepretpark Mini Mundi	Netherlands	2009	Operating	
Dragon	Powered Coaster / Single Helix	Playcenter São Paulo; HotZone	Brazil	2009; 2003 to 2009; 1991 to 2003	Operating	
Dragon	Powered Coaster / Single Helix	Kobe Oji Zoo	Japan	2009	Operating	
Dragon	Powered Coaster / Twin Helix	Perimágico	Mexico	2009	Removed	
Tornado Ren Expresi	Powered Coaster / Twin Helix	Ankara Luna Park	Turkey	2009	Operating	
Shinpi	Powered Coaster / Dragon	Nasu Highland Park	Japan	2009	Operating	
Mine Train	Powered Coaster / Custom	Leolandia	Italy	2009	Operating	
Rudolph Coaster	Powered Coaster / Custom	Suseong Land; Seongjigok Land	South Korea	2009; Unknown	Removed	
Tren Minero	Powered Coaster / Custom	Granja Villa	Peru	2009	Operating	
Dinosaur Mountain; Formerly Smart Shuttle	MotoCoaster	China Dinosaurs Park	China	2010	Operating	
Moto Bala	MotoCoaster 364m	Mundo Petapa	Guatemala	2010	Operating	
MotoGee	MotoCoaster 364m	Särkänniemi Amusement Park	Finland	2010	Operating	
Inertia Airplane Car	Volare / Standard	Kaeson Youth Park	North Korea	2010	Operating	
Circus Coaster	Speedy Coaster	Luna Park	United States	2010	Operating	
Tickler	Wild Mouse / Twister Coaster 420STD	Luna Park	United States	2010	Operating	
Raton Loroco	Wild Mouse / Twister Coaster 420STD	Mundo Petapa	Guatemala	2010	Operating	
Tuff-Tuff Tåget	Wild Mouse / Mini Mouse	Gröna Lund	Sweden	2010	Operating	
Achterbahn	Wild Mouse / Mini Mouse	Schwarzwald Park	Germany	2010	Removed	
Familienachterbahn	Family Gravity Coaster 80STD	Rügen Park	Germany	2010	Operating	
Magic Tornado	Powered Coaster / Single Helix	Magic Games	Brazil	2010	Operating	
Unknown	Powered Coaster / Single Helix	Taukbashçe	Kosovo	2010	Closed	
Steeplechase	MotoCoaster 364m	Scream Zone	United States	2011	Operating	
Soarin' Eagle; Formerly Flying Coaster	Volare / Standard	Scream Zone; Elitch Gardens	United States	2011; 2002 to 2010	Operating	
Rockstar Coaster; Formerly Power Trip Coaster; Formerly Galaxy Spin	Wild Mouse / Twister Coaster 420STD	Fun Spot America Kissimmee; Cypress Gardens	United States	2011; 2005 to 2008	Operating	
Twister Coaster	Wild Mouse / Twister Coaster 420STD	Tsentralnyy Park	Russia	2011	Operating	
Wild Mouse	Wild Mouse / Twister Coaster Compact	City Park Grad	Russia	2011	Operating	
Fiesta Express	Wild Mouse / Mini Mouse	Suvorov Park	Belarus	2011	Operating	
Minnie Mouse; Formerly Fiesta Express	Wild Mouse / Mini Mouse	Central Park; Gorky Park	Russia	2011; 2007 to 2011	Operating	
Speed Mouse	Junior Twister Coaster	Amazing World	China	2011	Removed	&
Bug Coaster	Junior Twister Coaster	Jingo's Jungle	Jordan	2011	Operating	
Kiddi Koasta	Speedy Coaster	Adventure Island	United Kingdom	2011	Operating	
Zooom!	Air Force / Custom	Flamingo Land	United Kingdom	2011	Operating	
Cosmic Coaster; Formerly Dragon Coaster	Powered Coaster / Single Helix	Valleyfair; Dorney Park	United States	2011; 1992 to 2010	Operating	
Dragon	Powered Coaster / Twin Helix	Dream Land	Cambodia	2011	Removed	
Formula 1	Powered Coaster / Custom	City Park Grad	Russia	2011	Operating	
Grand Canyon Express; Formerly Pony Express	Powered Coaster / Custom	Siam Park City; Jerudong Park Playground	Thailand	2011; 1995 to 2005	In storage	
Family Coaster	Powered Coaster / Custom	Taipei Children's Recreation Center	Taiwan	2011	Removed	
Fast Train Game	Powered Coaster / Custom	N2Fun	Saudi Arabia	2011	Operating	
Kwansong Tancha	Wild Mouse / Twister Coaster 420STD	Rungna People's Pleasure Ground	North Korea	2012	Operating	
Crazy Coaster	Wild Mouse / Twister Coaster 420STD	Luna Park	Australia	2012	Removed	
Speed Roller Coaster	Volare / Standard	Yancheng Chun-Qiu Land	China	2012	Operating	
Twisted Coaster	Junior Twister Coaster	HotZone	Brazil	2012	Operating	
Pindsvinet	Family Gravity Coaster 80STD	Fårup Sommerland	Denmark	2012	Operating	
Roller Coaster	Powered Coaster / Single Helix	Neverland	Spain	2012	Removed	
Dragon	Powered Coaster / Twin Helix	Playground Varna	Bulgaria	2012	Operating	
Roller Coaster	Unknown	Oaklands Amusement Park	Nigeria	2012	Operating	
Unknown	Powered Coaster / Single Helix	Crazy Park	Argentina	2012	Operating	
Speed Shuttle	MotoCoaster	Window of the World	China	2013	Operating	
Hero	Volare / Standard	Flamingo Land	United Kingdom	2013	Operating	
Twist 'n' Shout; Formerly Wild Wonder	Wild Mouse / Zig Zag Coaster	Family Kingdom Amusement Park; Magic Springs & Crystal Falls; Gillian's Wonderland Pier	United States	2013; 2000 to 2012; 1999	Operating	
Tornado	Wild Mouse / Twister Coaster 420STD	Parc Ange Michel	France	2013	Operating	
Unknown	Wild Mouse / Twister Coaster 420STD	Famili Parc	Algeria	2013	Operating	
Fiesta Express	Wild Mouse / Mini Mouse	Austin's Park N Pizza; Gillian's Wonderland Pier; Gillian's Funland; Cypress Gardens	United States	2013; 2011; 2009 to 2010; 2004 to 2008	Operating	
Fiesta Express	Wild Mouse / Mini Mouse	Gumo Land; Me World	South Korea	2013; 2004 to 2013	Operating	
Mini Express; Formerly iT'Z Express	Wild Mouse / Mini Mouse	Calaway Park iT'Z Family Food & Fun	Canada	2013; 2007 to 2012	Operating	
Cyclone Roller Coaster	Junior Twister Coaster	Floraland Continent Park	China	2013	Operating	
Twistosaurus	Junior Twister Coaster	Flamingo Land	United Kingdom	2013	Operating	
Mini Coaster	Speedy Coaster	Happy Valley Tianjin	China	2013	Operating	
Corsair Coaster	Speedy Coaster	Sokolniki Park	Russia	2013	Operating	
Hip Hop Coaster	Speedy Coaster	Etnaland	Italy	2013	Operating	
Baby Roller Coaster	Family Gravity Coaster 80STD	Floraland Continent Park	China	2013	Removed	
Jungle Coaster	Family Gravity Coaster 80STD	Fun World	Indonesia	2013	Operating	
Gold Rush Express	Unknown	Adlabs Imagica	India	2013	Operating	
Family Gravity	Family Gravity Coaster 80STD	Fuhua Amusement Park	China	2013	Operating	
Thunderbolt	Thunderbolt / Layout 01	Luna Park	United States	2014	Operating	
Rocket Cycles	MotoCoaster	Adventureland	United Arab Emirates	2014	Operating	
Speedy Gonzales Hot Rod Racers	Family Gravity Coaster 80STD	Six Flags Magic Mountain	United States	2014	Operating	
Cocoa Cruiser	Family Gravity Coaster 80STD	Hersheypark	United States	2014	Operating	
Ratón Feliz	Junior Twister Coaster	Xetulul	Guatemala	2014	Operating	
Roller Coaster	Powered Coaster / Mini Mine Coaster	Neverland	Argentina	2014	Operating	
Mining Coaster	Powered Coaster / Custom	Taman Safari Indonesia	Indonesia	2014	Operating	
Pir Döndü	Unknown	MOİ Park	Turkey	2014	Operating	
Storm Rider	MotoCoaster	Xishuangbanna Sunac Land	China	2015	Operating	
Aladdin Coaster	Wild Mouse / Twister Coaster 420STD	Sinbad Land	Iraq	2015	Operating	
Jurassic Twister	Wild Mouse / Twister Coaster 420STD	Parc du Bocasse	France	2015	Operating	
Runaway Mine Train	Junior Coaster / J2SK 277m	Cultus Lake Adventure Park	Canada	2015	Operating	
SpongeBob's Boating School Blast	Family Coaster 92m (Rev A)	Sea World	Australia	2015	Operating	
Humpty Dumpty's Great Fall	Family Coaster 92m (Rev A)	Storybook Land	United States	2015	Operating	
Troublesome Trucks Runaway Coaster	Speedy Coaster	Edaville Family Theme Park	United States	2015	Operating	
Cyclone; Formerly Monte Aurora	Galaxy / Small	Mirage Park; Terra Encantada	Brazil	2015; 1999 to 2010	Operating	
Wild West Express; Formerly Windstorm	Windstorm	Adventure Park USA; Old Town	United States	2015; 1997 to 2014	Closed	
Aero 5	Air Force / 5	Benyland	Japan	2015	Operating	
Boitata; Formerly Tornado	Powered Coaster / Single Helix	Fun Park Via Norte; Parque Guaíba	Brazil	2015; 2008 to 2014	Operating	
Dragon Coaster	Powered Coaster / Single Helix	Luna Park Sunny Beach	Bulgaria	2015	Operating	
Dragon Coaster	Powered Coaster / Single Helix	Family Fun Park	Egypt	2015	Operating	
Log Coaster; Formerly Silver Streak	Powered Coaster / Custom	Sky Ranch; Storyland	Philippines	2015; 1999 to 2009	Operating	
Octonauts Rollercoaster Adventure	Junior Coaster / J2SK 143m	Alton Towers	United Kingdom	2015	Operating	
Puss In Boots' Giant Journey	Unknown	Universal Studios Singapore	Singapore	2015	Operating	
Dragon Coaster	Powered Coaster / Single Helix	Family Park	Egypt	2015	Operating	
Dragon's Apprentice	Family Coaster 92m (Rev A)	Legoland Dubai	United Arab Emirates	2016	Operating	
Unknown	Junior Twister Coaster	RM Roma Land	Saudi Arabia	2016	Operating	
Speedy Coaster	Speedy Coaster	Gomel Amusement Park	Belarus	2016	Operating	
Speed Mouse	Powered Coaster / Single Helix	Ita Park; Parque Shanghai	Brazil	2016; Unknown	Removed	
Unknown	Powered Coaster / Custom	Toy Town	Saudi Arabia	2016	Operating	
Unknown	Powered Coaster / Single Helix	Adventure World	Saudi Arabia	2016	Operating	
Policías y Ratones	Wild Mouse / Twister Coaster 420STD	Bosque Mágico	Mexico	2016	Removed	
Rollin' Thunder	Thunderbolt / Layout 01	Tropic Falls Theme Park	United States	2017	Operating	
Crazy Mouse	Wild Mouse / Twister Coaster Compact	Tropic Falls Theme Park	United States	2017	Operating	
Southern Express	Family Coaster 92m (Rev A)	Tropic Falls Theme Park	United States	2017	Operating	
Whistle Punk Coaster	Family Coaster 92m (Rev A)	Dollywood	United States	2017	Operating	
Dragon's Apprentice	Family Coaster 92m (Rev A)	Legoland Japan	Japan	2017	Operating	
Wild Mouse	Wild Mouse / Twister Coaster Compact	Magic Land	Russia	2017	Operating	
Unknown	Powered Coaster / Unknown	Kids Village	Kuwait	2017	Operating	
Thunderchariot	Thunderbolt / Layout 02	Discoveryland	China	2018	Operating	
Cuyloco	Wild Mouse / Twister Coaster 420STD	Granja Villa	Peru	2018	Operating	
Family Coaster	Family Coaster 92m (Rev A)	Shanghai Haichang Ocean Park	China	2018	Operating	
Tom and Jerry: Swiss Cheese Spin	Unknown	Warner Bros. World Abu Dhabi	United Arab Emirates	2018	Operating	
Torbellino	Wild Mouse / Twister Coaster 420STD	Parque Diversiones	Costa Rica	2018	Operating	
Dragon	Powered Coaster / Twin Helix	Gumo Land	South Korea	2018	Operating	
Drydock Express	MotoCoaster 364m	Wanda Theme Park	China	2018	Operating	
Crazy Trail	Wild Mouse / Twister Coaster 420STD	Magikland	Philippines	2018	Operating	
Montaña Loca	Wild Mouse / Twister Coaster 420STD	Parque Los Valentinos	Mexico	2018	Operating	
Lika-Liku	Speedy Coaster	Saloka Theme Park	Indonesia	2018	Operating	
Boat Workshop	MotoCoaster	Nanjing Wanda Theme Park	China	2018	Operating	
Baz Coaster Ride	Speedy Coaster	Al Montazah Amusement Park	United Arab Emirates	2018	Operating	
Frankie's Mine Train	Family Coaster 92m (Rev A)	Frontier City	United States	2019	Operating	
Swampwater Snake; Formerly Fiesta Express	Wild Mouse / Mini Mouse	Wild Adventures	United States	2019; 2003 to 2011	Operating	
Volare Hiz Kizagi	Volare / Standard	Wonderland Eurasia	Turkey	2019	SBNO	
Çelik Kartal	Air Force / 5	Wonderland Eurasia	Turkey	2019	SBNO	
Rapid Train	Thunderbolt / Layout 01	Gyeongnam Mason Robotland	South Korea	2019	Operating	
Factory Coaster	Factory Coaster	Wuxi Sunac Land	China	2019	Operating	
Relámpago	Thunderbolt / Layout 03	Mundo Petapa	Guatemala	2019	Operating	
Formula Farm	Compact Spinning 53m	FICO World Eataly	Italy	2019	Operating	
Drakenbaan	Family Coaster 92m (Rev A)	Speelpark Oud Valkeveen	Netherlands	2019	Operating	
Formula Rossa Junior	Junior Coaster / J2SK 200m	Ferrari World Abu Dhabi	United Arab Emirates	2020	Operating	
Canal Peak	Thunderbolt	Dream City	China	2021	Operating	
Dragon's Apprentice	Family Coaster 92m (Rev A)	Legoland New York	United States	2021	Operating	
Lil' Devil Coaster; Formerly Road Runner Railway	Family Gravity Coaster 80STD	Six Flags Great Adventure	United States	2021; 1999 to 2019	Operating	
Mini Mouse	Wild Mouse / Mini Mouse	Luna Park; Victorian Gardens	United States	2021; 2003 to 2019	Operating	
Pinball X	Wild Mouse / Twister Coaster 420STD	Flamingo Park; Dreamland Margate	United Kingdom	2021; 2018 to 2020	Operating	
Storm	Powered Coaster / Single Helix	Magic Kass	Israel	2021	Operating	
Super Glider; Formerly Flying Coaster	Volare / Standard	Skytropolis Funland; Genting Theme Park	Malaysia	2021; 2004 to 2013	Operating	
Wave; Formerly Taxi#1	Family Coaster 92m (Rev A)	Real Madrid World; Bollywood Parks Dubai	United Arab Emirates	2021	Closed	
Tidal Twist	Wild Mouse / Twister Coaster 420STD	Columbus Zoo and Aquarium	United States	2021	Operating	
Crazy Mouse	Wild Mouse / Twister Coaster 420STD	SpeedZone; Niagara Amusement Park & Splash World	United States	2022; 2005 to 2019	Removed	
Daddy Pig's Roller Coaster	Family Coaster / Lift & Launch	Peppa Pig Theme Park Florida	United States	2022	Operating	
HuriHuri	Compact Spinning 123m	Tusenfryd	Norway	2022	Operating	
Sidewinder Safari	Wild Mouse / Twister Coaster 420STD	Six Flags Discovery Kingdom	United States	2022	Operating	
Tony's Express	J2SK 400m Combo	Luna Park	United States	2022	Operating	
Big Red Boat Coaster	Powered Coaster	Dreamworld	Australia	2023	Operating	
Eat My Dust	Junior Coaster / J2SK 200m	Walibi Holland	Netherlands	2023	Operating	
Eel Racing Coaster	Junior Coaster	SeaWorld Abu Dhabi	United Arab Emirates	2023	Operating	
Flying Viking	J2SK 400m Combo	Adventureland	United States	2023	Operating	
Wild Mouse	Twister Freeform	Cedar Point	United States	2023	Operating	
Brazilian Buggies	Family Coaster 92m (Rev B)	Bellewaerde	Belgium	2024	Operating	
Dragon	Powered Coaster / Single Helix	Playcenter Family	Brazil	2024	Operating	
Jeepodino	Family Coaster 92m (Rev B)	La Récré Des 3 Curés	France	2024	Operating	
Lightning Coaster	Lightning Coaster	Dinosaur DreamWorks	China	2024	Operating	
Papa Wutz' Achterbahn	Family Coaster / Lift & Launch	Peppa Pig Park	Germany	2024	Operating	
Snoopy's Tenderpaw Twister Coaster	Family Coaster / Lift & Launch	Knott's Berry Farm	United States	2024	Operating	
Spinning Coaster	Compact Spinning 53m	Playcenter Family	Brazil	2024	Operating	
ThunderVolt	Lightning Coaster	Playland	Canada	2024	Operating	
Tim's Runaway Grain Wagons	Family Coaster 92m (Rev A)	Vala's Pumpkin Patch	United States	2024	Operating	
Top Thrill 2	Lightning Coaster	Cedar Point	United States	2024	Operating	
Wizard Race	Powered Coaster / Twin Helix	Gyeongju World	South Korea	2024	Operating	
Daddy Pig's Roller Coaster	Family Coaster / Lift & Launch	Peppa Pig Theme Park Dallas-Fort Worth	United States	2025	Operating	
Dragon’s Apprentice	Family Coaster 92m (Rev B)	Legoland Shanghai	China	2025	Operating	
Loco Motion	Compact Spinning 123m	St. Louis Union Station	United States	2025	Operating	
Running Into The Sky	Thunderbolt / Layout 03	China Hiin City	China	2025	Operating	
Kyûbi Unchained	Family Thrill Launch / 670m	Parc Spirou Provence	France	2026	Operating	
Barrels O' Fun	Wild Mouse / Twister Coaster 420STD	Six Flags Great Adventure; Six Flags America; Six Flags Great America	United States	2026; 2014 to 2025; 2004 to 2013	Under construction	
Unknown; Formerly Roller Coaster	Family Gravity Coaster 80STD	Idlewild and Soak Zone; Boomers Family Fun Center	United States	2023; 1999 to 2019	In storage	&

== List of other attractions ==
Ride name	Park	Model	Opened	Ref
Wanna-Go-Round	Wannado City	12 Horse Carousel	2004-2011	
Winston´s Whistle-Stop Tour	Drayton Manor Theme Park	Aerial Ride	2013	
Batwing	Six Flags Over Texas	Aero Top Jet	2006	
Dino-Soarin'	Universal Studios Singapore	Aero Top Jet	2010	
Dumbo the Flying Elephant	Magic Kingdom	Aero Top Jet	1971	
Elmo's Rockin' Rockets	Sesame Place San Diego	Aero Top Jet	2022	
Elmo's Sea Subs	Sea World	Aero Top Jet	1999	
Fairy World Taxi Spin	Blackpool Pleasure Beach	Aero Top Jet	2011	
Fly with Appa	Nickelodeon Universe at the Mall of America	Aero Top Jet	2024	
Flyin' Fish	Sesame Place Philadelphia	Aero Top Jet	2006	
Green Lantern Emerald Flight; Formerly ZoomJets	Six Flags Fiesta Texas	Aero Top Jet	2009	
Jellyfish Fields Jamboree	Universal Kids Resort	Aero Top Jet	2026	
Jeremy's Flying Academy	Drayton Manor Theme Park	Aero Top Jet	2008	
Kang & Kodos' Twirl 'n' Hurl	Universal Studios Florida	Aero Top Jet	2013	
ZoomJets; Formerly Air Safari	Six Flags Great America	Aero Top Jet	2007	
ZoomJets; Formerly Big Red Planes	Six Flags New England	Aero Top Jet	2009	
ZoomJets	Great Escape	Aero Top Jet	2007	
Planes	Wannado City	Aero Top Jet (Mini)	2004	
Aang's Air Gliders	Nickelodeon Universe at the American Dream	Air Race	2019	
Air Force	Dreamland Margate	Air Race 8.2	2018-2020	
Air Race	Aquashow	Air Race	2011	
Air Race	Drayton Manor Theme Park	Air Race	2014	
Air Race	Fantasilandia	Air Race 8.4	2013	
Air Race	Gorky Park	Air Race	2012	
Air Race	Luna Park, Coney Island	Air Race	2010	
Air Race	Lagoon Amusement Park	Air Race	2012	
Air Race	Emerald Park	Air Race	2015	
Air Race	Brighton Pier	Air Race	2013	
Air Race	Fun Spot America	Air Race	2014	
Air Racer	Tropic Falls Theme Park	Air Race	2017	
Air Racers	Carowinds	Air Race	2023	
Air Raid	Fun Spot America	Air Race	2014	
Aquila	Tivoli Gardens	Air Race	2013	
Hihiberan	JungleLand	Air Race	2013	
Serpent Slayer	Dreamworld	Air Race	2012	
Rebuliço	Beto Carrero World	Air Race 8.4	2022	
Unknown	Rungna People's Pleasure Ground	Air Race	2012	
Flying Carpet	Gulliver's Kingdom	Ali Baba Carpet	1998	
Fire & Water Power	China Dinosaurs Park	Backflash - Suspended Windshear	2010	
Tornado	Dunia Fantasi	Backflash - Suspended Windshear	2007	
Windshear	Chime-Long Paradise	Backflash - Suspended Windshear	2006	
Unknown	Rungna People's Pleasure Ground	Backflash - Suspended Windshear	2012	
Toby's Tram Express	Drayton Manor Theme Park	Barnyard	2015	
Unknown	Rungna People's Pleasure Ground	Bumper Cars	2012	
Dodge'ms Bumper Cars	Wild Waves Theme Park	Bumper Cars	2002	
Taz's Hollywood Cars	Warner Bros. Movie World	Bumper Cars	1997	
Boulderville Express	Enchanted Kingdom	Circus Train	Unknown	
Big Rigs	Nickelodeon Universe at the Mall of America	Convoy	1992	
Big Rigs	Waldameer & Water World	Convoy	1999	
Blaze's Monster Truck Rally	Nickelodeon Universe at the American Dream	Convoy	2019	
Convoy	Hersheypark	Convoy	1990	
Convoy Grande	Six Flags Over Georgia	Convoy	1992	
Krazy Kars	Six Flags Fiesta Texas	Convoy	1992	
Monster Trucks	Six Flags Darien Lake	Convoy	1996	
Oscar's Sweep the Beach	Sea World	Convoy	1999	
Paris Convoy	Chuck E. Cheese	Convoy	Unknown	
Safari Jeep Tours	Six Flags Discovery Kingdom	Convoy	2006	
Shrek & Fiona's Happily Ogre After	Universal Kids Resort	Convoy	2026	
Tiny Truckers	Chessington World of Adventures	Convoy	1994	
Toadie's Crazy Cars	Chessington World of Adventures	Convoy	1987	
Convoy	Luna Park, Coney Island	Convoy	2010	
Happy Haulers	Tropic Falls Theme Park	Convoy	2017	
Bumblebee Boogie	Universal Studios Beijing	Counter Rotating Tables	2021	
Crazy Bertie Bus	Drayton Manor Theme Park	Crazy Bus	2008	
Bikini Bottom Bus Tour	Blackpool Pleasure Beach	Crazy Bus	2011	
Bash Street Bus	Chessington World of Adventures	Crazy Bus	2001	
Crazy Bus	Casino Pier	Crazy Bus	2014	
Crazy Bus	Särkänniemi	Crazy Bus	Unknown	
Crazy Caterpillar	Fantasy Island	Crazy Bus	2017	
Crazy Submarine	South Florida Fair	Crazy Bus	2013	
Crazy Trolley	Kennywood	Crazy Bus	2001	
Daffy's Deep Sea Diver	Six Flags Discovery Kingdom	Crazy Bus	1997	
Diego's Rescue Rider; Formerly Camp Bus	Nickelodeon Universe at the Mall of America	Crazy Bus	1992	
Dipsy Diver	Six Flags Darien Lake	Crazy Bus	1996	
Jumpin' Jet	Canada's Wonderland	Crazy Bus	2001	
Marvin the Martian Rocket Ride	Warner Bros. Movie World	Crazy Bus	1997	
Sally's Sea Plane	Kings Island	Crazy Bus	1998	
Safari Bus	Wild Adventures	Crazy Bus	1998	
The Loud House Road Trip	Nickelodeon Universe at the American Dream	Crazy Bus	2021	
Crazy Daizy Tea Cups	South Florida Fair	Crazy Daizy Tea Cups	2001	
Bello Bay Golf Cart Derby	Universal Kids Resort	Demolition Derby	2026	
Cars Quatre Roues Rallye	Walt Disney Studios Park	Demolition Derby	2007	
Diesel's Locomotion Mayhem	Drayton Manor Theme Park	Demolition Derby	2008	
Petir	JungleLand	Discovery	2013	
Chaos	Waldameer & Water World	Discovery Revolution	2019	
Cyclos	Kentucky Kingdom	Discovery Revolution	2015	
Luna 360	Luna Park, Coney Island	Discovery Revolution	2010	
Pendulum	Dreamland Margate	Discovery Revolution 16	2018	
Stratosfear	Rainbow's End	Discovery Revolution	2014	
Twister	Tropic Falls Theme Park	Discovery Revolution	2017	
Alba-Tossen	BonBon-Land	Disk'O	2004	
Ciklón	Isla Mágica	Disk'O	2005	
Disk'O	Adventuredome	Disk'O	2007	
Disk'O	Brean Leisure Park	Disk'O	2015	
Disk'O	Casino Pier	Disk'O	2007	
Disk'O	Cypress Gardens	Disk'O	2004	
Disk'O	Fantasilandia	Disk'O	2005	
Disk'O	Go Karts Plus	Disk'O	2006	
Disk'O	Golf N' Stuff	Disk'O	2004	
Disk'O	Great Yarmouth Pleasure Beach	Disk'O	2004	
Disk'O	Happy Valley Beijing	Disk'O	2006	
Disk'O	Happy Valley Chengdu	Disk'O	2006	
Disk'O	Happy Valley Wuhan	Disk'O	2012	
Disk'O	JungleLand	Disk'O	Unknown	
Disk'O	Mt. Olympus Water & Theme Park	Disk'O	2005	
Disk'O	Oaks Amusement Park	Disk'O	2007	
Disk'O	OCT East	Disk'O	2010	
Disk'O	Parc Hanayashiki	Disk'O	Unknown	
Disk'O	Preston Palace	Disk'O	Unknown	
Disk'O	Victory Kingdom	Disk'O	2012	
Disk'O	Wunderland Kalkar	Disk'O	2008	
Disk'O Flashback Boogie Ride	Wild Waves Theme Park	Disk'O	2008	
Disk'O Magic	Enchanted Kingdom	Disk'O	2012	
Dizzy Disk	Dollywood	Disk'O	2005	
Giant Redback	Aussie World	Disk'O	2011	
Goon-E	Electric Daisy Carnival	Disk'O	2010	
Jurakán	Xetulul	Disk'O	2008	
La Cavalerie	Fraispertuis City	Disk'O	2005	
La Déferlante	Parc Ange Michel	Disk'O	2010	
Disco Loco	Mer de Sable	Disk'O	2016	
Mia's Riding Adventure	Legoland Florida	Disk'O	2015	
Moto Disco	Jin Jiang Action Park	Disk'O	2006	
Moto Disk'O	Parque Mundo Aventura	Disk'O	2016	
Ramba Zamba	Adventure Island	Disk'O	2004	
Revolution 360	Seabreeze	Disk'O	2010	
Trombi	Tykkimäki	Disk'O	2005	
UFO	Happy Valley Shenzhen	Disk'O	2006	
Buffalo Bill Rodeo	Mirabilandia	Disk'O Coaster	2016	
Coaster Brontosaurus	China Dinosaurs Park	Disk'O Coaster	2006	
Crazy Surfer	Movie Park Germany	Disk'O Coaster	2007	
De Grote Golf	Plopsaland	Disk'O Coaster	2013	
Dino Disk'O	Parc Saint Paul	Disk'O Coaster	2019	
Discobélix	Parc Astérix	Disk'O Coaster	2016	
Disk’O	Happy Valley Shanghai	Disk'O Coaster	2009	
Edge	Paultons Park	Disk'O Coaster	2009	
Girabugia	Miragica	Disk'O Coaster	2009	
Kobra	Chessington World of Adventures	Disk'O Coaster	2010	
Le Disque du Soleil	Le Pal	Disk'O Coaster	2007	
Le Grizzli	Nigloland	Disk'O Coaster	2006	
Shockwave	Dreamworld	Disk'O Coaster	2011	
Spin Blast	Beto Carrero World	Disk'O Coaster	2023	
The Invader	Rainbow's End	Disk'O Coaster	2009	
The Riddler Revolution	Warner Bros. World Abu Dhabi	Disk'O Coaster	2018	
Thor	Drayton Manor	Disk'O Coaster	2022	
Tiki Twirl; Formerly Survivor: The Ride	California's Great America	Disk'O Coaster	2006	
Tyrsky	Särkänniemi	Disk'O Coaster	2009	
Wave Rider	Tropic Falls Theme Park	Disk'O Coaster	2017	
Unknown	Ankapark	Disk'O Coaster	2019	
Coney Island Top Drop	Luna Park Melbourne	Drop Tower	2010	
Coney Tower	Luna Park Coney Island	Drop Tower	2010	
Sky Jumper	Six Flags America	Drop Tower	2011	
Dreamcatcher	Dreamland Margate	Endeavour (Trailer Model)	2018	
Endeavor	Luna Park, Coney Island	Endeavour	2015	
Catwoman Whip	Six Flags Over Texas	Endeavour	2016	
Catwoman Whip	Six Flags Over Georgia	Endeavour	2020	
Endeavor	Emerald Park	Endeavour	2016	
Endeavor	Trimper’s Rides	Endeavour	2016	
Alabama Wham’a	Tropic Falls Theme Park	Endeavour	2017	
Scream Xtreme	Kentucky Kingdom	Endeavour	2018	
Sol Spin	Kings Island	Endeavour	2023	
Supergirl: Sky Flyer	Six Flags St. Louis	Endeavour	2019	
Supergirl: Sky Flyer	Six Flags New England	Endeavour	2021	
El Paso Express	Lion Country Safari	El Paso Train	1967	
Unknown	Rungna People's Pleasure Ground	Energy Storm	2012	
Regency Square Express	Regency Square Mall	Extended Rio Grande Train	2005	
Tour de ville	La Ronde	Family Swinger	2003	
Aero Nomad	Legoland Windsor	Ferris Wheel	1996	
Chuck Wagon	PowerLand	Ferris Wheel	2005	
Pup, Pup & Away	Nickelodeon Universe at the American Dream	Ferris Wheel	2019	
Round the World Ferris Wheel	Six Flags Discovery Kingdom	Ferris Wheel	1998	
Spinning Reef; Formerly Big Bird's Spinning Reef	SeaWorld San Antonio	Ferris Wheel	2010	
Flynn's Fire Rescue	Drayton Manor Theme Park	Fire Brigade	2015	
Dreamland Drop	Dreamland Margate	Sky Tower (43m)	2018	
Wave Swinger	Six Flags Discovery Kingdom	Flying Carousel	1998	
Lynn’s Trapeze	Luna Park, Coney Island	Flying Carousel	2010	
Flying Swings	Waldameer & Water World	Flying Carousel	2011	
Flying Carousel	Tropic Falls Theme Park	Flying Carousel	2017	
HallowSwings	Holiday World	Flying Carousel	2003	
SpongeBob's Jellyfish Jam	Nickelodeon Universe at the American Dream	Flying Carousel	2019	
Swings Over Del Mar	Universal Kids Resort	Flying Carousel	2026	
The Dreamworld Flyer	Dreamworld	Flying Carousel	2023	
Bizzy Dizzy Bees	Fantasy Island	Flying Tigers	2017	
Fairly Odd Airways	Nickelodeon Universe at the American Dream	Flying Tigers	2019	
Flying Tigers	Lagoon	Flying Tigers	2017	
Flying Tigers	Tropic Falls Theme Park	Flying Tigers	2017	
Galinheiro das Divas	Beto Carrero World	Flying Tigers	2026	
Pirate Ship	Gulliver's Kingdom	Galleon	1992	
Ark	Six Flags Discovery Kingdom	Galleon	1998	
Galleon	Kaeson Youth Park	Galleon	2010	
Galleon	Alabama Splash Adventure (formerly at Bowcraft Amusement Park)	Galleon	2019	
Black Widow	Kennywood	Giant Discovery	2012	
Giant Discovery	China Dinosaurs Park	Giant Discovery	2006	
Giant Discovery	Kaeson Youth Park	Giant Discovery	2010	
Harley Quinn: Spinsanity	Six Flags New England	Giant Discovery	2018	
Harley Quinn: Spinsanity	Six Flags America	Giant Discovery	2021	
Pandemonium	Six Flags Over Georgia	Giant Discovery	2019	
Scream Machine	Adlabs Imagica	Giant Discovery	2013	
SpinSpider	Tusenfryd	Giant Discovery	2009	
Svend Svingarm	BonBon-Land	Giant Discovery	2010	
The Riddler Revenge	Six Flags Over Texas	Giant Discovery	2016	
Titan	La Ronde	Giant Discovery	2017	
Wonder Woman: Lasso of Truth	Six Flags Discovery Kingdom	Giant Discovery	2017	
Crazanity	Six Flags Magic Mountain	Giga Discovery	2018	
Crazanity	Six Flags Mexico	Giga Discovery	2020	
Joker: Carnival of Chaos	Six Flags Fiesta Texas	Giga Discovery	2019	
Joker: Carnival of Chaos	Six Flags St. Louis	Giga Discovery	2024	
Sky Striker	Six Flags Great America	Giga Discovery	2024	
Wonder Woman: Lasso of Truth	Six Flags Great Adventure	Giga Discovery	2019	
Skybender	Playland	Gryphon	2022	
Spinvasion	Kennywood	Gryphon	2023	
Boots' Banana Swing	Nickelodeon Universe at the American Dream	Happy Swing	2021	
Boots' Banana Swing	Nickelodeon Universe at the Mall of America	Happy Swing	2024	
Happy Swing	iPlay America	Happy Swing	2011	
Happy Swing	Waldameer & Water World	Happy Swing	2012	
Sweet Swing	Hersheypark	Happy Swing	2014	
Swingin’ Fun	Tropic Falls Theme Park	Happy Swing	2017	
Aero 360	Kennywood	Hawk	2000	
Hammerhead Shark	Six Flags Discovery Kingdom	Hawk	1998	
Meteor	Dorney Park	Hawk	2002	
Screamin' Eagle	Seabreeze	Hawk	1998	
Timberaxe	Wild Waves Theme Park	Hawk	2002	
Vertigo	La Ronde	Hawk	2003	
Unknown	Rungna People's Pleasure Ground	Hawk	2012	
Lumberjack	Canada's Wonderland	Hawk	2018	
Jambo	Six Flags Discovery Kingdom	Joker	1998-2006	
Baja Buggy	South Florida Fair	Jump Around	2017	
Bouncing Bugs	Fantasy Island	Jump Around	2017	
Flying Frogs	Bengtson's Pumpkin Farm	Jump Around	2007	
Frog Hopper	Six Flags Discovery Kingdom	Jump Around	2006	
Frog Jump	Doha Quest	Jump Around	2021	
Jump Around	Canobie Lake Park	Jump Around	2009	
Jump Around	Casino Pier	Jump Around	2014	
Jump Around	iPlay America	Jump Around	2011	
Jump Around	PowerPark	Jump Around	2007	
Leap Frog	Tropic Falls Theme Park	Jump Around	2017	
Ruka Safari	Lagoon Amusement Park	Jump Around	2017	
Shimmer & Shine Jumping Genies	Nickelodeon Universe at the American Dream	Jump Around	2019	
Snoopy’s Space Buggies	Kings Island	Jump Around	2015	
Wave Blaster	Canobie Lake Park	Jump Around	2010	
Wonder Pets! Big Circus Bounce	Blackpool Pleasure Beach	Jump Around	2011	
Zip Zap Race	Tropic Falls Theme Park	Jump Around	2017	
Dolphin Dive; Formerly Elmo's Dolphin Dive	SeaWorld San Antonio	Jumpin' Star	2010	
Flying Fiddler	SeaWorld Orlando	Jumpin' Star	2006	
Frog Hopper	Alton Towers	Jumpin' Star	1999	
Gully Washer	Tropic Falls Theme Park	Jumpin’ Star	2017	
Jumpin' Joey	Six Flags Great Adventure	Jumpin' Star	1999	
Jumping Star	Gulliver's Kingdom	Jumpin' Star	2003	
Jumpin' Star	Rainbow's End	Jumpin' Star	2004	
Jumping Star	PowerLand	Jumpin' Star	2002	
Kite Eating Tree	Cedar Point	Jumpin' Star	2008	
Kite Eating Tree	Kings Island	Jumpin' Star	2006	
Lumber Jump	Thorpe Park	Jumpin' Star	2017	
Mr. Bull's High Striker	Peppa Pig Theme Park Dallas-Fort Worth	Jumpin' Star	2025	
Mr. Bull's High Striker	Peppa Pig Theme Park Florida	Jumpin' Star	2022	
Sylvester's Pounce and Bounce	Six Flags Discovery Kingdom	Jumpin' Star	1997	
Treetop Hoppers	Chessington World of Adventures	Jumpin' Star	2001	
Tweety's Tree House	Great Escape	Jumpin' Star	2005	
Pounce Bounce	Kennywood	Jumpin' Tower 16	2002-2020	
Pteranodrop	Universal Kids Resort	Jumpin' Tower 16	2026	
Mini Dino's	Canobie Lake Park	Junior Jet	Unknown	
Kang-A-Bounce	Wild Waves Theme Park	Kang-A-Bounce	2007	
Kang-A-Bounce	Morey's Piers	Kang-A-Bounce	Unknown	
Coney Island Sound	Luna Park, Coney Island	Kang-A-Bounce	2010	
Superman: Tower of Power	Six Flags Over Georgia	Kiddie Drop Tower	2016	
Swing Thing	Hersheypark	Kids Chair Swing Ride	1985	
Charlie Brown's Wind Up	Kings Island	Kids Chair Swing Ride	1992	
Air Racer	Dream Island	Kite Flyer	2021	
Kite Flyer	Pleasurewood Hills	Kite Flyer	2000	
Linus' Launcher	Kings Island	Kite Flyer	2006	
Humpty-Go-Round	Dreamworld	Kite Flyer	2008	
Coney Island Hang Glider	Luna Park, Coney Island	Kite Flyer	2010	
Taz's Typhoon	Six Flags Discovery Kingdom	Lolly Swing	1997	
Snoopy's Junction	Dorney Park	Looney Tooter	2011	
Magic Bikes	Luna Park, Coney Island	Magic Bikes	2010	
Unknown	Rungna People's Pleasure Ground	Magic Bikes	2012	
Gully's Magic Bikes	Gulliver's Kingdom	Magic Bikes	2013	
Flutter By	Tropic Falls Theme Park	Magic Bikes	2017	
Magic Bike	Doha Quest	Magic Bikes	2021	
Soaring Seagulls	Dreamland Margate	Magic Bikes	2018	
Kapulele Gliders	Lost Island Theme Park	Magic Bikes	2022	
Flying Machine	Ghibli Park	Magic Bikes	2024	
Avatar Airbender	Blackpool Pleasure Beach	Mega Disk'O	2011	
Cosmic Chaos	Kennywood	Mega Disk'O	2007	
Disk'O	Parque de Diversiones	Mega Disk'O	2006	
Electro Spin	Luna Park, Coney Island	Mega Disk'O	2010	
Electro Spin	Parc du Bocasse	Mega Disk'O	2010	
Electro Spin	Silver Dollar City	Mega Disk'O	2006	
Grand Tournoi	Festyland	Mega Disk'O	2010	
Gyro Spin	Lotte World	Mega Disk'O	2013	
HangHai	Liseberg	Mega Disk'O	2009	
Het DrakenNest	Avonturenpark Hellendoorn	Mega Disk'O	2017	
Kong	West Midland Safari Park	Mega Disk'O	2015	
L’Apache	Papéa Parc	Mega Disk'O	2015	
Mega Disk'O	Didi’Land	Mega Disk'O	2013	
Mega Disk'O	Fantasy Island	Mega Disk'O	2009	
Mega Disk'O	Kaeson Youth Park	Mega Disk'O	2010	
Mia's Riding Adventure	Legoland Windsor	Mega Disk'O	2015	
Navigator	Flamingo Land	Mega Disk'O	2005	
Rev-O-Lution	Lake Compounce	Mega Disk'O	2011	
Spinsanity	Six Flags St. Louis	Mega Disk'O	2017	
Tail Spin	Wild Adventures	Mega Disk'O	2013	
Temp’O	Dennlys Parc	Mega Disk'O	2012	
Mega Vortex	Waldameer & Water World	Mega Disk'O	2009	
Tifon	Parque de Atracciones de Madrid	Mega Disk'O	2008	
Lady's Carousel	Drayton Manor Theme Park	Merry Go Round	2008	
Sea Swinger	SeaWorld San Antonio	Midi Discovery	2019	
Giant Swing	Trans Studio Mini Bandung inside the Transmart Buah Batu Square	Discovery Revolution	2011	
Gravity Swing	Doha Quest	Midi Discovery	2021	
The Rattler	Camden Park	Midi Discovery	2012	
Extreme Supernova	Great Escape	Midi Discovery	2014	
Butterbean's Sweet Spin	Nickelodeon Universe at the American Dream	Midi Tea Cup	2021	
Tea Party	Luna Park, Coney Island	Midi Tea Cup	2010	
Tipsey Tea Cups	Lagoon	Midi Tea Cup	2013	
Tea Cups	Hersheypark	Midi Tea Cup	2014	
Tea Time	Tropic Falls Theme Park	Midi Tea Cup	2017	
Orbiter	Kennywood	Mini Enterprise	1982-2020	
Moonraker	Lagoon	Mini Enterprise De Luxe	1983	
Blue's Skidoo	Nickelodeon Universe at the American Dream	Mini Jet	2019	
Critter Chase	Six Flags Darien Lake	Mini Jet	2010	
Dora the Explorer Sea Planes	Dreamworld	Mini Jet	1983-2010	
Elephant Parade	Kennywood	Mini Jet	1987-2023	
Flying Aces	Tropic Falls Theme Park	Mini Jet	2017	
Little Aviator	Six Flags Over Georgia	Mini Jet	2004-2016	
Mini Jets	PowerLand	Mini Jet	2003	
Red Baron	Hersheypark	Mini Jet	1990	
Scaliwags	Lagoon	Mini Jet	1986	
Tava's Elephant Parade	Six Flags Discovery Kingdom	Mini Jet	2006	
Tweety and Sylvester Cages	Warner Bros. Movie World	Mini Jet	1997	
Yosemite Sam's Flight School	Six Flags Discovery Kingdom	Mini Jet	1997	
Jack's Tea Party	Rides At Adventure Cove	Mini Tea Cup	2008	
Mini Tea Cup	PowerLand	Mini Tea Cup	2002	
Pepe Le Pew's Rafts of Romance	Six Flags Discovery Kingdom	Mini Tea Cup	1997	
Swishy Fishies	SeaWorld Orlando	Mini Tea Cup	2006	
Tea Party	Idlewild and Soak Zone; Geauga Lake	Mini Tea Cup	2009; Unknown	
Twisty Tubs	Six Flags Darien Lake	Mini Tea Cup	1996	
Wendy's Tea Party	Waldameer	Mini Tea Cup	2011	
Axis	Knoebels Amusement Resort	Mixer		
Mixer	Adventureland	Mixer		
AirBoat	Walibi Rhône-Alpes	Nebulaz	2020	
Chez Girofolix	Parc Astérix	NebulaZ	2023	
Clockwork	The Island in Pigeon Forge	NebulaZ	2022	
Clockworkz	Luna Park, Coney Island	Nebulaz	2019	
Cyborg Cyber Revolution	Six Flags Fiesta Texas	NebulaZ	2024	
Gear Spin	Carowinds	NebulaZ	2023	
Hampi	Bellewaerde	NebulaZ	2023	
Le Nébulaz	Parc Saint Paul	Nebulaz	2022	
Loki	Drayton Manor	Nebulaz	2022	
Mix'd	Hersheypark	Nebulaz	2022	
NebulaZ	Adventuredome	Nebulaz	2020	
NebulaZ	Magic Kass	Nebulaz	2021	
Polar Compass	Dream Island	Nebulaz	2021	
Red, White, and Woo	Bay Beach Amusement Park; Tom Foolery's Adventure Park at Kalahari Resort Round Rock	Nebulaz	2023; 2020-2022	
Space Nebula	Sanya Silk Road Happy World	Nebulaz	2022	
Space Nebula	Silk Road Paradise Xi'an	NebulaZ	2023	
SteamWhirler	Six Flags America	Nebulaz	2024	
Stellarium	Familypark	Nebulaz	2021	
Tempus	Liseberg	Nebulaz	2022	
Tidsmaskinen	Bakken	Nebulaz	2021	
Time Travel	Doha Quest	NebulaZ	2021	
Time Twister	Waldameer & Water World	NebulaZ	2025	
Unknown	Canobie Lake Park	NebulaZ	2024	
Unknown	VidantaWorld	NebulaZ	2023	
Mermaid Parade	Casino Pier	North Pole	2019	
Mermaid Parade	Luna Park, Coney Island	North Pole	2010	
Unknown	Rungna People's Pleasure Ground	People Express	2012	
Bulwagi Ride	Lion Country Safari	Peter & Paul	1967	
High Voltage	Särkänniemi	Power Surge	2014	
Kicir Kicir	Dunia Fantasi	Power Surge	2002	
Power Surge	Luna Park, Coney Island	Power Surge	2010	
Power Surge	Kaeson Youth Park	Power Surge	2010	
Power Surge	Rainbow's End	Power Surge	2004	
Vertigo	Trans Studio Mini Bandung inside the Transmart Buah Batu Square	Power Surge	2011	
Jolly Buccaneer	Drayton Manor Theme Park	Regatta	1992	
The Backyardians' Pirate Treasure	Blackpool Pleasure Beach	Regatta	2011	
Thrilla Gorilla	Six Flags Discovery Kingdom	Regatta	1998	
Jolly Roger	Six Flags Great Adventure	Regatta	1999	
Dora's Sky Railway	Nickelodeon Universe at the American Dream	Rio Grande	2019	
Holly Jolly Railway	SeaWorld Orlando	Rio Grande	Holiday Seasons Only	
La Aventura De Azul; Formerly Bloomington Express	Nickelodeon Universe at the Mall of America	Rio Grande	1998	
Rio Grande Train	South Florida Fair	Rio Grande	2009	
Macy's Pink Pig / Pink Pig Train	Macy's-Lenox Square Mall	Rio Grande	Christmas 2005-2020	
Christmas Train	Staten Island Mall	Rio Grande	2003 (Holidays Only)	
Holly Jolly Railway / Seven Seas Railway	SeaWorld Orlando	Rio Grande	2011-2013	
JJ's Express	Give Kids the World	Rio Grande Train	2002	
Macy's Pink Pig	Macy's-Lenox Square Mall	Rio Grande Train	2005	
Marketplace Express	Disney Springs Marketplace	Rio Grande Train	2006	
Rio Grande Train	PowerLand	Rio Grande Train	2003	
Yosemite Sam's Railroad	Warner Bros. Movie World	Rio Grande Train	1997	
Strong Express Train	Strong Museum of Play	Rio Grande Train	Unknown	
Wannado City Express / Western Connection	Wannado City	Rio Grande Train	2004	
Rio Grande Train	Lion Country Safari	Rio Grande Train	2017	
Old Town Express	Old Town Kissimmee	Rio Grande Train	1986	
Barnacle Bus	Universal Kids Resort	Rockin' Tug	2026	
Big Red Boat Ride	Dreamworld	Rockin' Tug	2012	
Bikini Bottom Crosstown Express	Nickelodeon Universe at the American Dream	Rockin' Tug	2019	
Bikini Bottom Crosstown Express	Sea World	Rockin' Tug	2015	
Brooklyn Barge	Luna Park, Coney Island	Rockin’ Tug	2010	
Caddo Lake Barge	Six Flags Over Texas	Rockin' Tug	2006	
Camden Princess	Camden Park	Rockin' Tug	2010	
Congo Queen	Six Flags Discovery Kingdom	Rockin' Tug	2006	
Destiny's Bounty	Legoland Windsor	Rockin' Tug	2008	
Heave Ho	Alton Towers	Rockin' Tug	2008	
Lilla Lots	Liseberg	Rockin' Tug	2006	
Lucy's Tugboat	Canada's Wonderland	Rockin' Tug	2010	
Ocean Commotion	SeaWorld Orlando	Rockin' Tug	2006	
Rockin' Bulstrode & Sodor Docks	Drayton Manor Theme Park	Rockin' Tug	2008	
Rockin' Rocket	Kemah Boardwalk	Rockin' Tug	2009	
Rockin' Tug	Six Flags Over Georgia	Rockin' Tug	2004	
Rockin' Tug	Morey's Piers	Rockin' Tug	Unknown	
Rockin' Tug	Mahons Amusements New Zealand	Rockin' Tug	2010	
Rockin' Tug	Woodlands Adventure Park	Rockin' Tug	Unknown	
Rock the Boat	Dreamland Margate	Rockin' Tug	2018	
S.S. Kenny	Kennywood	Rockin' Tug	2007-2023	
SS Wally	Waldameer & Water World	Rockin' Tug	2011	
Tide Pool Tumbler; Formerly Abby Cadabby's Rockin' Wave	SeaWorld San Antonio	Rockin' Tug	2010	
Timber Tug Boat	Thorpe Park	Rockin' Tug	2017	
Trawler Trouble	Chessington World Of Adventures	Rockin' Tug	2022	
Tango	Six Flags Great Adventure	Rockin' Tug	2006	
Rockin' Tug	Butlins Skegness	Rockin' Tug	2004	
Glow Worm	Fantasy Island	Rockin' Tug	2017	
The Jetster's Wild Ride	Six Flags Great America	Rockin' Tug	2004-2016	
Rockin’ Raft	Tropic Falls Theme Park	Rockin’ Tug	2017	
Over the Rainbow	Canobie Lake Park	Samba Balloon	2001	
Sky Zooma	Six Flags Great Adventure	Samba Balloon	1999	
Weather Balloons	Six Flags Darien Lake	Samba Balloon	1996	
James and the Red Balloon	Drayton Manor Theme Park	Samba Balloon	2017	
Balloon Race	Idlewild and Soak Zone	Samba Balloon	1991	
Elmer's Weather Balloon Service	Six Flags Discovery Kingdom	Samba Balloon	1997	
Inside Out Emotional Whirlwind; Formerly Flik's Flyers	Disney California Adventure Park	Samba Balloon	2002	
Sky Balloons	Tropic Falls Theme Park	Samba Balloon	2017	
Balloon Race	Waldameer & Water World	Samba Balloon	2018	
Up, Up and Away	Dreamland Margate	Samba Balloon	2018	
Abby's Flower Tower; Formerly Jazzy Jellies	SeaWorld Orlando	Samba Tower	2006	
Bubble Guppies Guppy Bubbler!	Nickelodeon Universe at the American Dream	Samba Tower	2021	
Bubble Guppies Guppy Bubbler!	Nickelodeon Universe at the Mall of America	Samba Tower	2015	
Cloud Bouncer	Six Flags Over Texas	Samba Tower	2006	
Flying Cookie Jars; Formerly Big Bird's Balloon Race	Sesame Place Philadelphia	Samba Tower	2003	
Grover's Flight School	Sea World	Samba Tower	1999	
Hair in the Clouds	Universal Kids Resort	Samba Tower	2026	
Harold's Helicopter Tours	Drayton Manor Theme Park	Samba Tower	2008	
Nairobi's LookOut Balloons	Six Flags Discovery Kingdom	Samba Tower	2006	
Peppa Pig's Balloon Ride	Peppa Pig Theme Park Dallas-Fort Worth	Samba Tower	2025	
Peppa Pig's Balloon Ride	Peppa Pig Theme Park Florida	Samba Tower	2022	
Poison Ivy Toxic Spin; Formerly Up, Up & Away	Six Flags Fiesta Texas	Samba Tower	2009	
Sesame Street Soar & Spin	Sesame Place San Diego	Samba Tower	2022	
Up, Up & Away	Six Flags Great America	Samba Tower	2007	
Air Walker	Carowinds	Skater	2023	
Skater	Canobie Lake Park	Skater	2005	
Northern Lights	Valleyfair	Skater Coaster	2014	
Pipe Scream	Cedar Point	Skater Coaster	2014	
Surf Dog; Formerly Avatar The Last Air Bender	Kings Island	Skater Coaster	2006	
Cranky's Drop Tower	Drayton Manor Theme Park / Edaville Railroad	Sky Drop	2008 and 2015	
Sky Drop	Adventure Island	Sky Drop	2004	
Negeri Raksasa	Trans Studio Mini Bandung inside the Transmart Buah Batu Square	Sky Drop	2011	
Unknown	Rungna People's Pleasure Ground	Sky Drop	2012	
Sky Drop	Great Yarmouth Pleasure Beach	Sky Drop	2004	
Unknown	Rungna People's Pleasure Ground	Sombrero	2012	
Peanuts 500	California's Great America	Speedway	2015	
Peanuts 500	Canada's Wonderland	Speedway	2010	
Peanuts 500	Worlds of Fun	Speedway	2011	
Peanuts 500	Valleyfair	Speedway	2011	
PEANUTS Trailblazers	Carowinds	Speedway	2018	
Red Rock Rally	Lagoon	Speedway	2013	
Ricochet Racin' with Taz	Warner Bros. World Abu Dhabi	Speedway	2018	
Swiper's Sweeper; Formerly Speedway	Nickelodeon Universe at the Mall of America	Speedway	1992	
Zuma's Zoomers	Nickelodeon Universe at the American Dream	Speedway	2021	
Atlantic Aviator	Luna Park, Coney Island	Super Air Race	2019	
Dare Devil Dive: Flying Machines	Six Flags Fiesta Texas	Super Air Race	2021	
Seaside Swing	Luna Park, Coney Island	Super Happy Swing	2010	
Surf's Up	Fun Spot America Kissimmee	Surf's Up	2009	
Surf's Up	Luna Park, Coney Island	Surf's Up	2010	
Surf's Up	Minitalia Leolandia Park	Surf's Up	2009	
Unknown	Wannado City	Swinging Boat	2004	
Cargo Loco	Kings Island	Tea Cups	2023	
Enchanted Teacups	Six Flags Great Adventure	Tea Cups - Four Platform Model	1996	
TriceraTop Spin	Disney's Animal Kingdom	Telecombat	2002	
Tiny Tracks	Hersheypark	Train ride	1995	
Unknown	Rungna People's Pleasure Ground	Twist & Bounce	2012	
Fiesta Mexicana	PowerPark	Vertical Swing	2007	
Flight	Fantasy Island	Vertical Swing	2008	
Brooklyn Flyer	Luna Park, Coney Island	Vertical Swing	2010	
Sparkler	Holiday World & Splashin' Safari	Vertical Swing	2012	
Freedom Flyer	Tropic Falls Theme Park	Vertical Swing	2017	
Unknown	Rungna People's Pleasure Ground	Vertical Swing	2012	
Naval Battle	Hangzhou Bay Sunac Water Park	Water Fight	2021	
Bobbing Barrels	Universal Kids Resort	Watermania	2026	
Bucket Blasters	The Great Escape and Hurricane Harbor	Watermania	2019	
Captain's Sea Adventures	Drayton Manor Theme Park	Watermania	2015	
Daffy Duck's Bucket Blasters	Six Flags Over Texas	Watermania	2014	
Super Soaker Splash	Beto Carrero World	Watermania	2023	
Water Carnival	Hangzhou Bay Sunac Water Park	Watermania	2021	
Watermania	Luna Park, Coney Island	Watermania	2010	
Blue Mountain Engines	Drayton Manor Theme Park	Whilly Thomas	2011	
WindstarZ	Luna Park, Coney Island	WindstarZ	2010	
AeroZoom	Tropic Falls Theme Park	WindStarZ	2017	
Windstorm	Old Town Kissimmee	Windstorm	1997	
Z-Force	Kaeson Youth Park	Z-Force	2011	
Unknown	Rungna People's Pleasure Ground	Zodiac	2012	
Unknown	Parque Diversiones Costa Rica	Air Race	2025	
