= Universal Kids Resort =

2026 theme park in Frisco, Texas

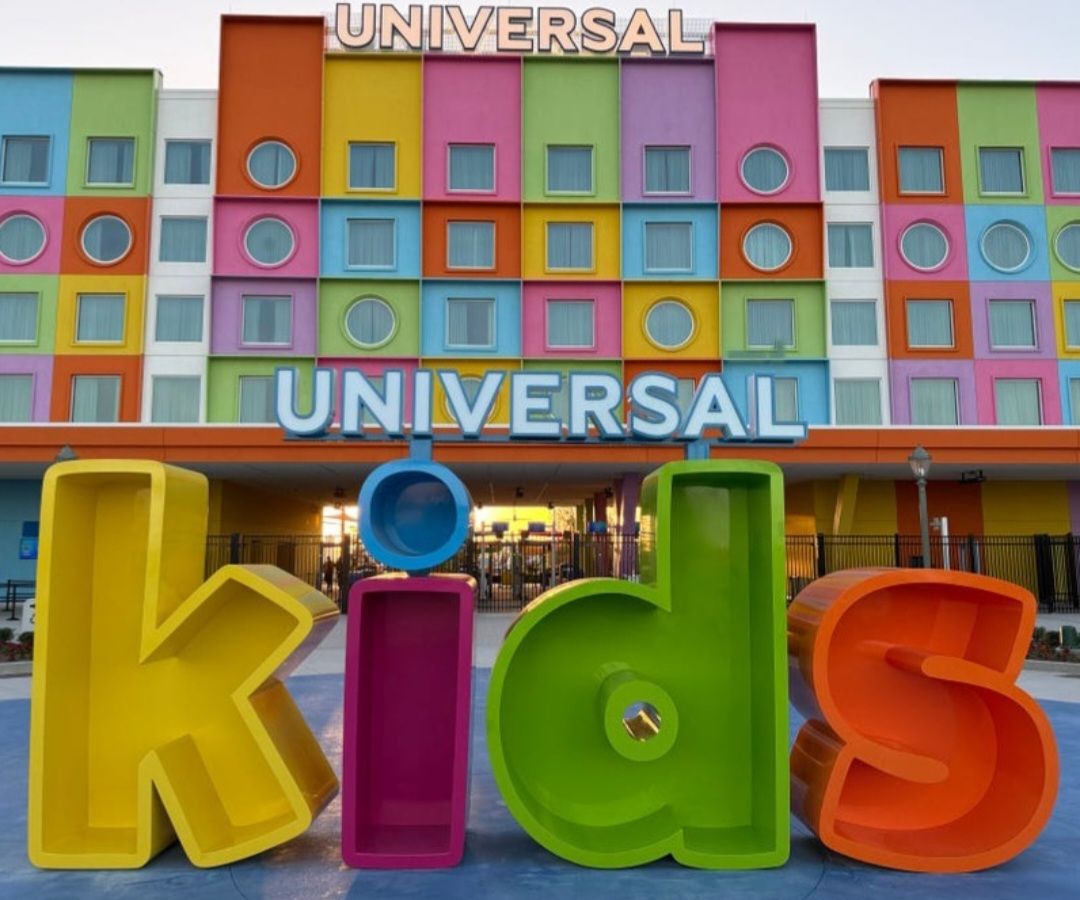
- The Universal Kids Resort sign, with the Universal Kids Resort Hotel and gates to the theme park in the background
- Interactive map of Universal Kids Resort
- Location: Universal Kids Resort, Frisco, Texas, United States
- Coordinates: 33.192469°N 96.833137°W
- Status: Operating
- Opened: July 1, 2026; 4 months ago
- Owner: NBCUniversal (Comcast)
- Operated by: Universal Destinations & Experiences
- Theme: NBCUniversal / Nickelodeon properties; Gabby's Dollhouse; Trolls; Shrek (also Puss in Boots); Jurassic World Camp Cretaceous; SpongeBob SquarePants; Despicable Me
- Area: 32-acre (13 ha)
- Website: Official website

Universal Kids Resort is a 32-acre (13 ha) children's theme park and entertainment resort in Frisco, Texas, United States. Limited test operation started on June 24, 2026, before it fully opened on July 1, 2026. It is the sixth Universal Studios Resort, and the third in the United States. The park features several themed areas based on Gabby's Dollhouse, Trolls, Shrek (also Puss in Boots), Jurassic World Camp Cretaceous, SpongeBob SquarePants, and Despicable Me.

== History ==
On January 11, 2023, Universal Parks & Resorts announced a "new concept"-styled resort, geared towards families with children. On March 8, 2023, Universal Parks & Resorts changed their name to Universal Destinations & Experiences. Construction began on the theme park in Frisco, Texas, in November 2023, with an estimated cost of around $550 million. On December 1, 2023, the name of the resort was revealed to be Universal Kids Resort. The resort encompasses 32 acres (13 ha) of land and a 5-story, 300-room hotel.

In February 2024, Moss Utilities LLC was hired as the utilities contractor for the park. On June 1, 2024, the park was expected to open in June 2026. In November 2024, the park was estimated to open by May 2026, in time for the 2026 FIFA World Cup, which occurred in the region. The main road to the resort, Universal Parkway, was expected to open in 2024, with an estimated cost of around $12.94 million. By January 2025, the road was then projected to open later in the year. By February 2026, the park was set to open in late 2026. On May 28, 2026, it was announced that the park would open on July 1, 2026, with the names of the lands revealed. The park also opened on the same day as Universal Pictures's Minions & Monsters. The park had an early preview on June 24.

== Lands and attractions ==
Universal Kids Resort consists of seven themed lands. In clockwise order from entry, the themed lands are based on Gabby's Dollhouse, Trolls, Shrek, Puss in Boots, Jurassic World Camp Cretaceous, SpongeBob SquarePants, (Note: The intellectual property rights are owned by Nickelodeon Animation Studio and United Plankton Pictures) and Despicable Me. The themed lands consist of swing rides, a river rapids ride, an aerial carousel, a rockin' tug, and two roller coasters.

=== Isle of Curiosity ===
Isle of Curiosity is inspired by DreamWorks Animation's Gabby's Dollhouse series.

=== TrollsFest ===
TrollsFest is inspired by DreamWorks Animation's Trolls franchise.

Attraction	Date opened	Manufacturer	Model
Rhonda's Trollfest Express	July 1, 2026	Zierer	Force 190
Hair in the Clouds	July 1, 2026	Zamperla	Samba Tower

=== Shrek's Swamp ===
Shrek's Swamp is inspired by DreamWorks Animation's Shrek franchise.

Attraction	Date opened	Manufacturer	Model
Shrek & Fiona's Happily Ogre After	July 1, 2026	Zamperla	Convoy

=== Puss in Boots Del Mar ===
Puss in Boots Del Mar is inspired by DreamWorks Animation's Puss in Boots films.

Attraction	Date opened	Manufacturer	Model
Swings Over Del Mar	July 1, 2026	Zamperla	Flying Carousel

=== Jurassic World Adventure Camp ===
Jurassic World Adventure Camp is inspired by Amblin Entertainment and DreamWorks Animation's Jurassic World Camp Cretaceous series.

Attraction	Date opened	Manufacturer	Model
Jurassic World: Cretaceous Coaster	July 1, 2026	Mack Rides	YoungSTAR
Mr. DNA's Double Helix Spin	July 1, 2026	Metallbau Emmeln	Flying Wheels
Pteranodrop	July 1, 2026	Zamperla	Jumping Towers

=== SpongeBob SquarePants Bikini Bottom ===
SpongeBob SquarePants Bikini Bottom is inspired by Nickelodeon's SpongeBob SquarePants series. As of 2026, it is the only section in the park to be based on a licensed property.

Attraction	Date opened	Manufacturer	Model
Barnacle Bus	July 1, 2026	Zamperla	Rockin' Tug
Bobbing Barrels	July 1, 2026	Zamperla	Watermania
Jellyfish Fields Jamboree	July 1, 2026	Zamperla	Aero Top Jet
Mrs. Puff's Boating School	July 1, 2026	Zierer	Roundabout

=== Minions vs. Minions: Bello Bay Club ===
Minions vs. Minions: Bello Bay Club is inspired by Illumination's Despicable Me franchise.

Attraction	Date opened	Manufacturer	Model
Bello Bay Cruise	July 1, 2026	Hafema	Wild Raft
Bello Bay Golf Cart Derby	July 1, 2026	Zamperla	Demolition Derby

== Hotel ==
Universal Kids Resort featured one official hotel, the Universal Kids Resort Hotel, which is located in front of the entrance to the park.

Name	Opening date	Number of rooms
Universal Kids Resort Hotel	July 1, 2026	300

== Critical reception ==
The announcement of Universal Kids Resort was met with local enthusiasm yet upon opening was immediately criticized by visitors, with many finding the park cheaply designed, utilitarian, and generally falling well below the standards of theming within other Universal parks. Many reviews also criticize the park for lacking appropriate shade while being situated in Texas, while other reviews described it as "ugly, underthemed ... barren concrete stretches" that overall reflect "a type of cheapness and tackiness".
