= Dennlys Parc =

Theme park in France

- Previously known as Le moulin de la Tour
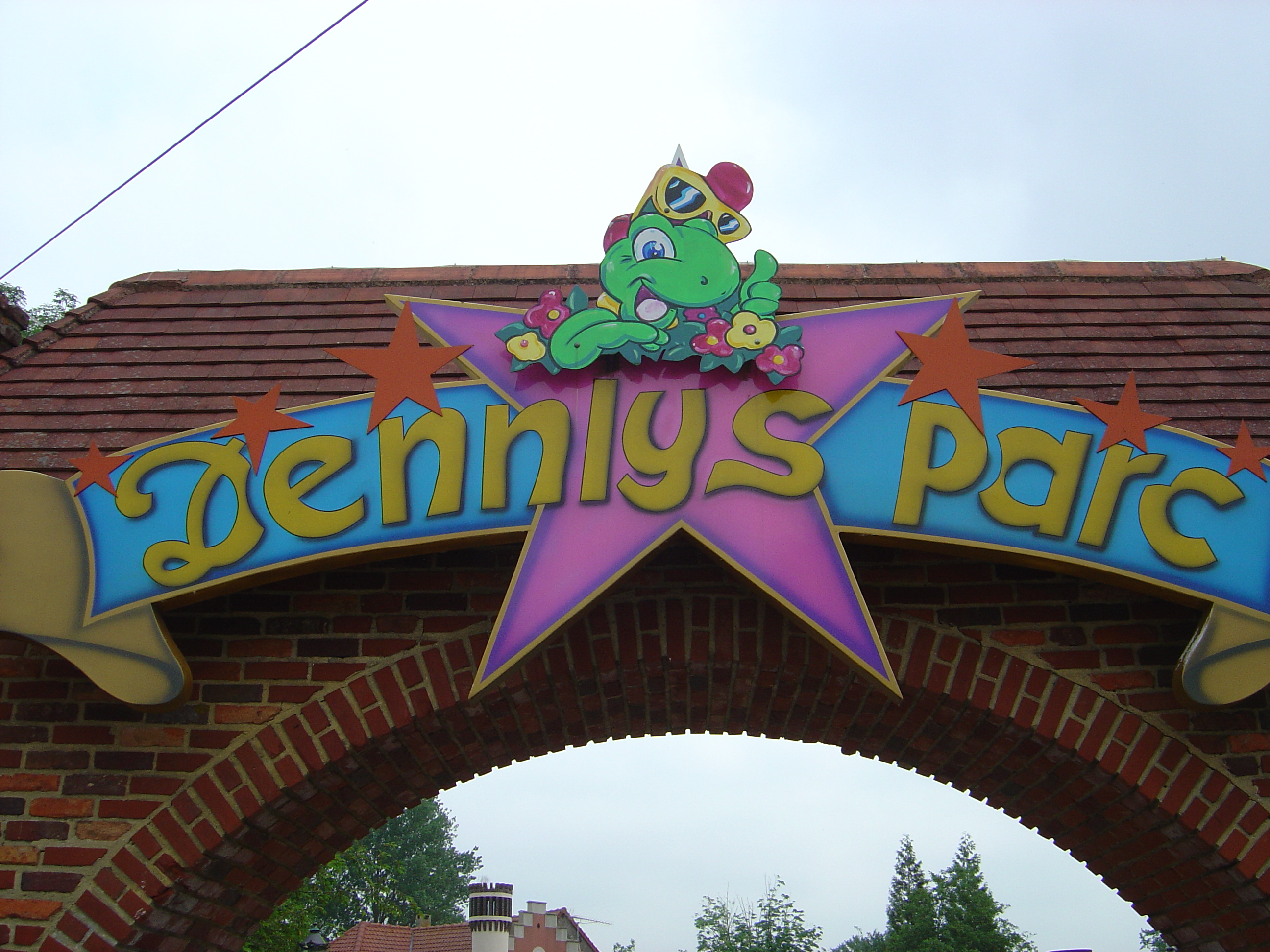
- Interactive map of Dennlys Parc
- Location: Dennebrœucq, Pas-de-Calais, France
- Coordinates: 50°34′14″N 2°9′15″E
- Opened: 1983
- Owner: The Crunelle Family

Attractions
- Total: 15
- Roller coasters: 2
- Water rides: 2
- Website: www.dennlys-parc.com

Dennlys Parc is a theme park in Dennebrœucq, Pas-de-Calais. The park's mascot is Denno the tortoise.

== History ==
In 1983, a family from a carnival background, Monsieur and Mme Gérard Crunelle, found by chance that the Old Watermill was for sale. After years of work, conceptualizing and creating the settings, the Old Watermill became Dennlys Park. Christian Crunelle, son of Gérard and manager since 1997, strives to preserve the family festival atmosphere.

== Gallery ==
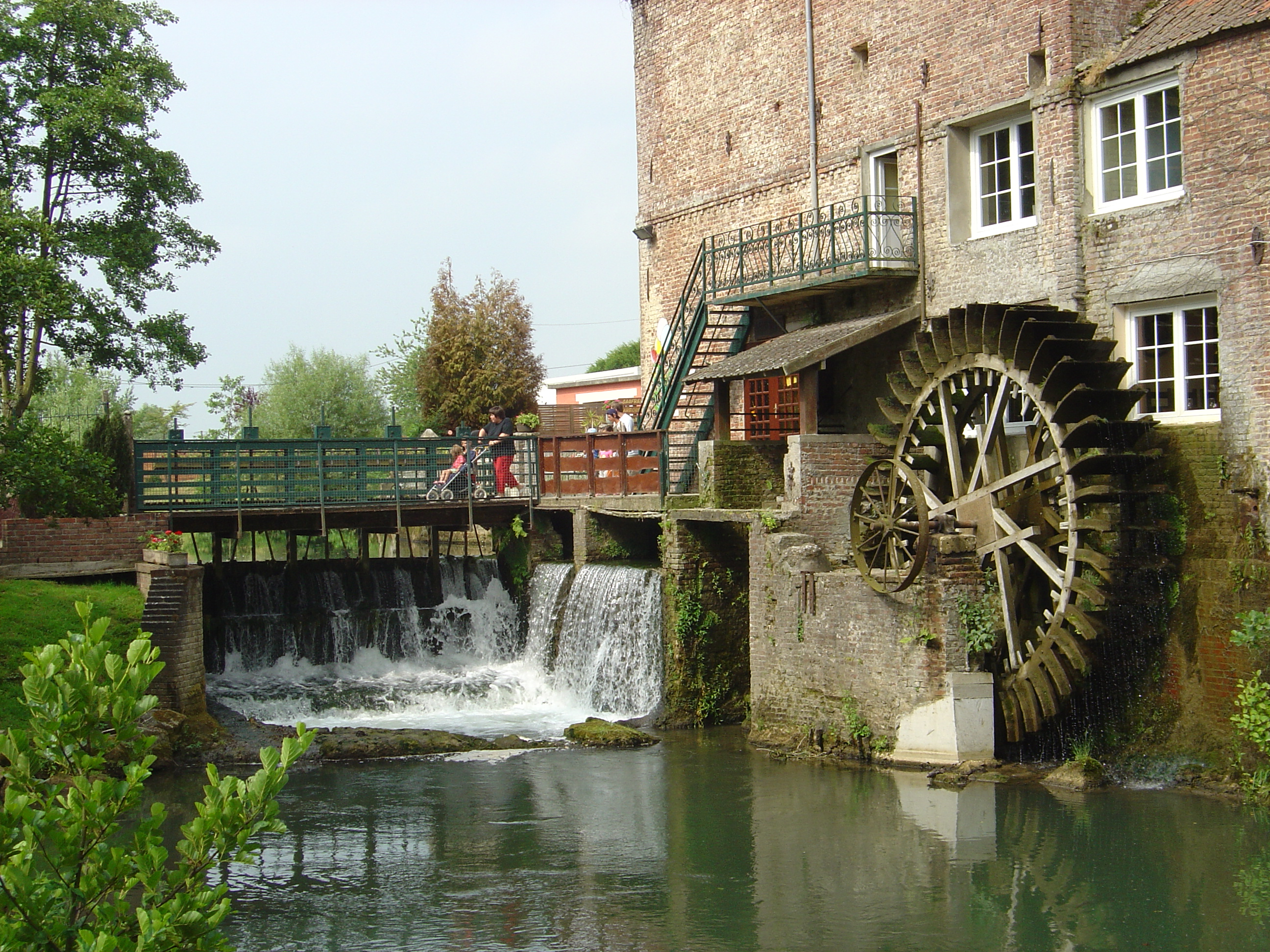
The Watermill

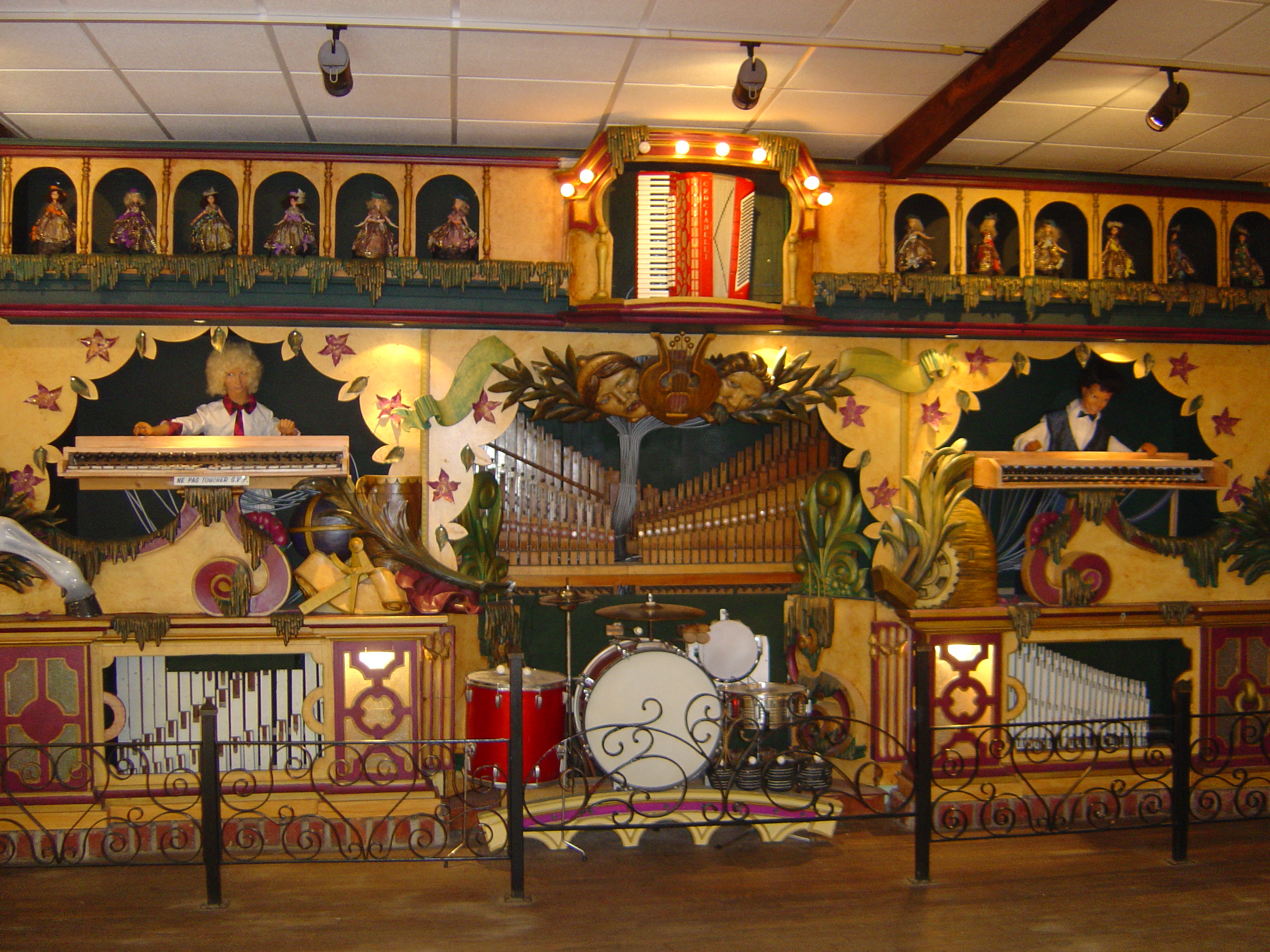
The Organ

== The Attractions ==
=== Rollercoasters ===
Name	Type	Built by	Year	Year closed
Nitro	Wild Mouse	Preston & Barbieri	2010	No
Furio	Train	Soquet	2003	No
Tornado	Rollercoaster	Zamperla	1996	2008

=== Other attractions ===
- Cannibal Pots - Rotary Ride (2006)
- Chateau hanté - Haunted House and scenic views
- Monorail Denno - Monorail
- La place des Geyser - Water Sports Area (2007)
- Rio Grande - Train
- Rokin'Tug - Rockin' Tug - Zamperla (2005)
