= Gillian's Wonderland Pier =

Former amusement park in Ocean City, New Jersey

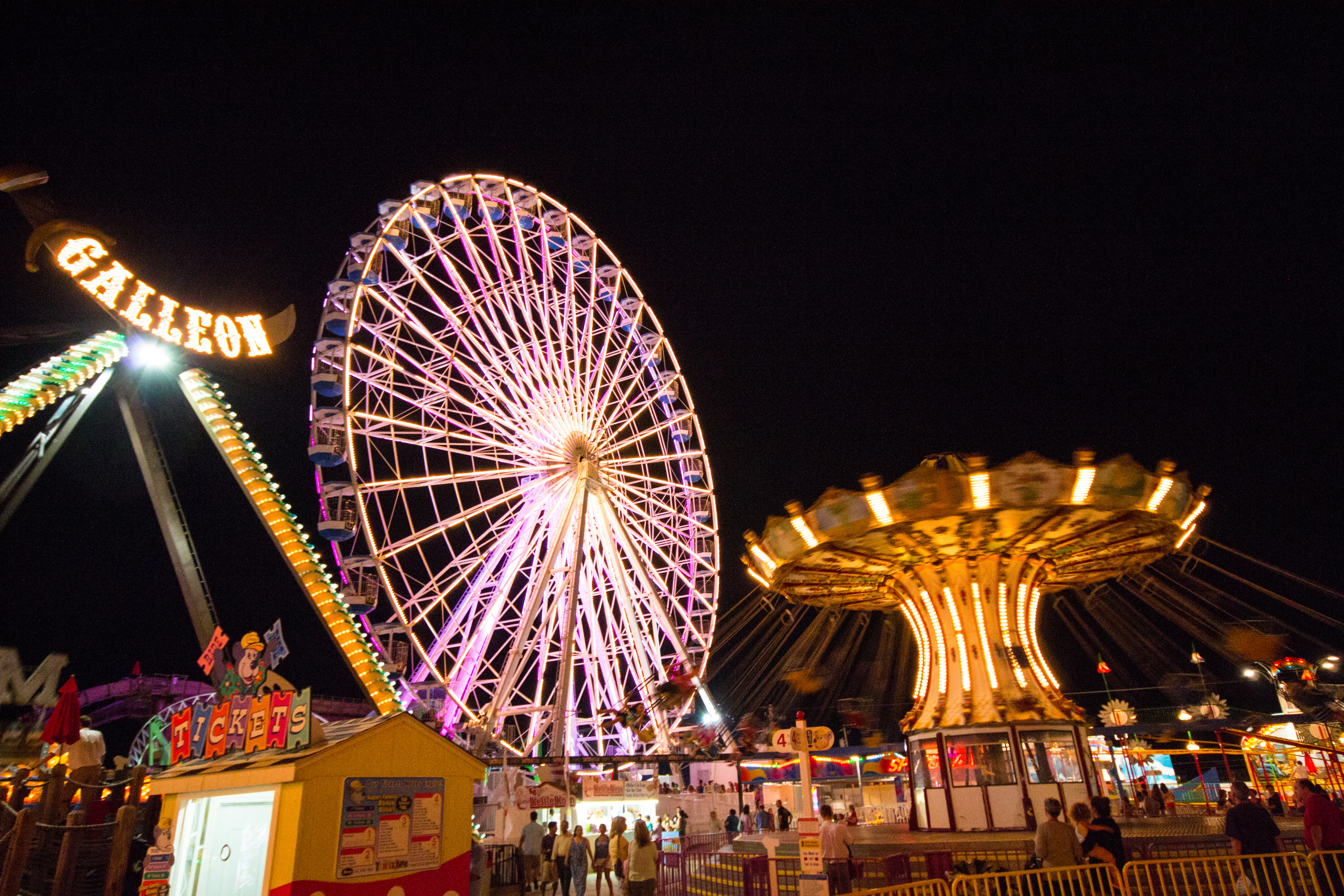

- Location in Cape May County Location in New Jersey Location in the United States
- Location: 6th and Boardwalk, Ocean City, New Jersey, United States
- Coordinates: 39.277398°N 74.566757°W
- Status: Defunct
- Opened: 1965
- Closed: October 13, 2024
- Owner: Jay Gillian
- Slogan: Amusements with the family in Mind!
- Operating season: April to October
- Attendance: 1,000,000

Attractions
- Total: 23
- Roller coasters: 1 (Wacky Worm Roller Coaster)
- Water rides: 1 (Canyon Falls Log Flume)
- Website: gillians.com

Gillian's Wonderland Pier is a closed historic amusement park in Ocean City, New Jersey. It was founded in 1965 by Roy Gillian, son of David Gillian who first came to Ocean City in 1914. It was located near the beginning of the commercial boardwalk on 6th street. Gillian's was generally considered to be an institution of Ocean City, with grand openings and pre-season sales for the location historically having drawn crowds multiple blocks long, and employed many local youths during the summer, and in more recent years, many Eastern European workers. It is famous for its 144-foot (44 m) Giant Wheel, one of the largest Ferris wheels on the east coast.

== History ==
Roy Gillian started his career in the orchestra at C. Elwood Carpenter's Dance Club (aka The Casino), located over the Moorlyn Theater on the old Boardwalk. In 1917 he transferred to the Hippodrome pier, where he played with Robin Robinson's Orchestra. The Hippodrome had a movie theatre, vaudeville, dancing and amusements for children.

In October 1927, a fire destroyed the Hippodrome, after which the burned boardwalk was replaced in 1928. In 1930, David Gillian opened a Fun Deck at Plymouth Place and the Boardwalk. The two main attractions were a Ferris wheel and a carousel. The Fun Deck was transformed into a water park (today known as OC Waterpark) after 1987.

In honor of his 100th birthday in 1990, David Gillian donated a horse from the Carousel to the Ocean City Historical Museum. David Gillian died in March 1993 at the age of 102.

In 1957, David Gillian retired and his sons, Bob and Roy took over from 1957 to 1977. In 1965, Roy left the family business and started Wonderland Pier at 6th Street and the Boardwalk (where Stainton's Playland had burned down 10 years prior), with 10 rides and a parking lot. Roy became mayor of Ocean City in 1985, and retired from politics in 1989. In 1994, Roy became the president of IAAPA (International Association of Amusement Parks and Attractions). His son, Jay Gillian, became mayor of Ocean City in 2010.

The Gillian family decided to expand their business beyond Ocean City in 2009 by opening Gillian's Funland of Sea Isle City, located on JFK Boulevard. It closed in 2014 after only five years of operation due to lasting damage from Hurricane Sandy that was unable to be repaired in a cost-effective manner.

In January 2021, Gillian's was under foreclosure but the Gillian family announced they would still be open for the 2021 season. On March 30 they announced they were teaming up with Icona Hotel owners to enhance the park. On August 9, 2024, owner Jay Gillian announced that Gillian's Wonderland Pier would close its doors after the 2024 season, saying it was no longer a viable business. The park closed for the final time on October 13 of that year. The closure would spark opposition and a petition was created to save the pier from its demise.

On November 13, 2024, 1 month after the park's closure, property owner Eustace Mita revealed his plans to convert the property into an Icona resort, later Icona in Wonderland. The proposed resort consists of 252 rooms, retail space along the boardwalk, which would keep the Carousel and Giant Wheel attractions from the closed pier. Mita was hoping to start construction in early 2025 and have the project completed by 2027.

On August 21, 2025, during a city council meeting, the plan was rejected in a 6–1 vote, in which now the future of the property remains uncertain. Mita had the property up for sale starting with $25 million at the least, but has been put on hold until further notice.

Despite initial plans to keep the Giant Wheel and carousel, in October 2026, it was announced that the iconic ferris wheel in Gillian's would likely be demolished. Its lack of use over the years has led to a deteriorated condition that would cost $2,000,000 to $3,000,000 to repair. Mita stated that both he and the government of Ocean City were unwilling to take on the costs of repairing it. Similar costs were estimated with the carousel, although there have been calls by local residents for the city to preserve it in some way.

== Former Attractions ==
Name	Manufacturer	Addition	Removal	Other Information	Reference
Alien Abduction	Wisdom Rides	2012	2020		
Bear Affair	Sellner Manufacturing	1996 (Original), 2000	1999 (Original), 2023	The ride replaced a portable 4-car version that was commonly found at fairs in 2000, with a 6-car version and rotating floor. 42 inches	
City Jet	Anton Schwarzkopf	1976	2004		
Dragon Wagon		1996	1997		
Fiesta Express	Zamperla	2011	2011		
Fun Slide		2008		Has children slide down a decline with potato sacks	
Matterhorne			1997		
Miner Mike	Wisdom Rides	1998	2011		
Python		1996			
Ring of Fire					
Runaway Train	L&T Systems	2006	2018		
Salt and Pepper Shaker					
Skooter Bumper Cars		Bertazzon		42 inches (50 inches)	
Skydiver	Chance Rides	1975 or Before	2000		
Sling Shot	Chance Rides	2004	2010	Relocated to Gloria's Fantasyland	
Twister	Zamperla	1997	2007		
Wild Mine Roller Coaster		2006		Half a dozen other attractions were moved to make way for the ride.	
Wild Mouse		1996			
Wild Wonder	Zamperla	1999	2000		

== Indoor Attractions ==
Name	Addition	Manufacturer	Information	Minimum height to ride alone	Reference
Carousel	1972	Philadelphia Toboggan Company	The historic carousel was originally built in 1926, registered as carousel #75. It has a decorative facade similar to the Wurlitzer style #157 Military Band Organ by Kromer, but it does not provide the music on the carousel. It was formerly located at Rolling Green Park in Selinsgrove, Pennsylvania until 1972.	42 inches	
Crazy Submarine	1997	Zamperla		42 inches	
Dune Buggies		Hampton Amusement	Maximum height requirement is 54 inches, and adults and teenagers aren't allowed on the ride.		
Fire Engines	1940s	Pinto Bros	No adults or teenagers are allowed on the ride	None	
Frog Jump Around		Zamperla		36 inches	
Frontier Express Monorail	1965		The ride originally was nicknamed, the "Red Raider" in honor of the town's high school mascot, it originally had 4 cars, and it only circled around the indoor area. However, in 1986, new cars, a Frontier theme, and an expanded layout were added to the ride. The cars now loosely resemble Thomas the Tank Engine.	48 inches	
Rock Wall				36 inches	
Rocky and the Railroad Ramblers	1992	Pizza Time Theatre, Inc. Sally Corporation	Commonly referred to as "The Man & Dog Show," this animatronic stage show can be found between the loading and unloading platforms of the Frontier Express Monorail. With a payment of $1, the characters perform one country song at a time, a total of eight songs in all. The cast consists of Rocky (a panda), Bubba Bonga (a mountain lion), Henry "Hank" Howls (a dalmatian), Henrietta Hatpin (a female chicken), and Antonio Vermicelli (a male human born in Nebraska who poses as an Italian). These animatronics are retrofits of the common "Cyberamics" characters from Chuck E. Cheese's Pizza Time Theatre. The current soundtrack and equipment used for Rocky and the Railroad Ramblers have been provided by Sally Corporation in Jacksonville, Florida. Relocated to Ocean City Promenade Food Court in summer of 2025.	N/A	
Wet Boats	1994	Allan Herschell	No adults or teenagers are allowed on the ride	None	

== Mid-Deck Attractions ==
Name	Addition	Manufacturer	Information	Minimum height (to ride alone)	Reference
Balloon Race		Zamperla		32 inches (42 inches)	
Bungee Jump			Maximum weight allowed is 240 lbs. No teenagers or adults are allowed on the ride.	36 inches	
Chopper Train		SBF Visa Rides	No single teenagers or adults are allowed on the ride.	36 inches	
Giant Wheel	1989		The Ferris wheel is one of the largest of its kind on the east coast, being 144 feet (44 m) tall. The current wheel is a replacement of one that was slightly shorter and removed in 2001.	48 inches	
Glass House		Gillian's	All riders must keep their hands in front of them and walk slowly, as they progress through the maze.	None	
Jumbo		Zamperla		(36 inches)	
Kite Flyer		Zamperla		36 inches (42 inches)	
Musik Express	2000	Bertazzon	The ride replaced "Himalaya"	44 inches (48 inches)	
Raiders		Wisdom Rides		38 inches (42 inches)	
Super Fun Slide	2021	Frederiksen Industries			
Swings	Before 2018	Barock	Replaced an older model of the ride in 2018.	48 inches	
Wacky Worm	2005		An older model operated at the park from 2005 to 2010, but the model was relocated to Gillian's Funland in Sea Isle City from 2011 to 2013. The newer model was purchased in 2012. The Sea Isle City model now operates at Alabama Splash Adventure in Bessemer, Alabama as Centi-Speed. A new paint scheme was added for the 2021 season.	36 inches (42 inches)	

== Lower Lot Attractions ==
Name	Addition	Manufacturer	Information	Minimum height (to ride alone)	Reference
Canyon Falls Log Flume	1992	Hopkins Rides	Formerly known as Canyon Tour	(42 inches)	
Haunted House Dark Ride	2012	Sally Corporation		36 inches (48 inches)	
Moby Dick	2005	Wisdom Rides		42 inches (48 inches)	
Speedway	1997	Zamperla		(36 inches)	
Tilt-A-Whirl	Before 2000	Sellner Manufacturing	A new version replaced the old one in 2002.	(36 inches)	

== Upper Deck Attractions ==
Name	Addition	Manufacturer	Minimum height (to ride alone)	Reference
Frisbee	2000	HUSS	54 inches	

== Accidents ==
Over the course of the park's history, there have been 3 deaths and 9 hospitalizations due to injuries resulting from park actions, resulting in hundreds of thousands of dollars in fines towards the park.

City Jet

In 1992, Kathleen Stephens, a rider at Gillian's, sued the park for more than $100,000 in damages after riding the 'City Jet' coaster, which she alleged left her with an amputated ear, broken hand, and injured head due to a dislocated support cable that struck her while her cart was moving.

Wild Wonder

On August 28, 1999, two people were killed and two injured when a car on the newly installed Wild Wonder roller-coaster lost traction with the rails on a steep ascent and plunged backwards by 30 feet. The victims of the accident were a 39-year-old woman, Kimberly Bailey, and her 8-year-old daughter, Jessica. Owner of the park Jay Gillian stated that in response to the accident, the coaster would be removed for the following park season.

The Division of Codes and Standards fined the park $25,000 for safety violations. The following year, the husband and father of the victims, John J. Bailey Jr. sued the park and sought $275 million in damages, and claimed that the Pier knew the coaster was defective prior to opening it, and further stated that his 5-year-old daughter was nearly killed in the accident as well, but failed to meet height requirements to get into the cart with her sister and mother. A former employee of Zamperla, the manufacturer of the ride, later sued the company, claiming they fired him for pointing out safety concerns regarding the Wild Wonder. A law was passed in the event of the Baileys' deaths that strengthened law enforcement power to investigate accidents and dish out larger fines for safety violations.

Canyon Falls Log Flume

On July 22, 2007, 5 people (3 adults and 2 children) were injured on the flume after a loose bolt, believed to be the cause of a malfunction on the ride, caused two logs to collide with each other.

Speedway

On August 25, 2013, a 4-year-old girl was on the platform of the ride as it was about to start, and was struck. She was then transported to the hospital shortly after. According to a spokeswoman from the NJ Department of Labor & Community Affairs, "the accident was caused by operator error, and the operator was later fired. There were no mechanical problems with the ride, and the operator responsible for the incident was fired."

Ferris Wheel

On May 2, 2022, a 62-year-old subcontractor, Robert W. Sanger, fell off of a lift while working on the ferris wheel, dying upon impact. An investigation subsequently took place by OSHA. OSHA issued a fine of over $10,000 to the park, stating that Gillian's had not ensured that "each walking/working surface could support the intended load for that surface."

Nonfatal incidents

In 1980, various waterslides were temporarily closed after the plastic chute on one of them broke and fell, although not injuring anyone. The waterslides at the park had the materials of their shoots replaced with fiberglass, as the former material was declared by state inspectors as "prone to breaking".

September 16, 1995, saw a power outage in Ocean City that left several people stuck on Gillian's Ferris wheel. The weight of the wheel overpowered itself and eventually allowed the riders to descend to the bottom without any rescue being needed.

In June 2007, the park was closed for two hours after a 17-year-old girl had fired shots from a .22 caliber gun into a sand dune from one of the Pier's rides. After investigation, it had been discovered that she had found it on a seat, accidentally dropped by an off-duty policeman from Philadelphia.
