= Tiny Truckers =

Children's rail ride

Coordinates: 51°20′53″N 0°19′3″W

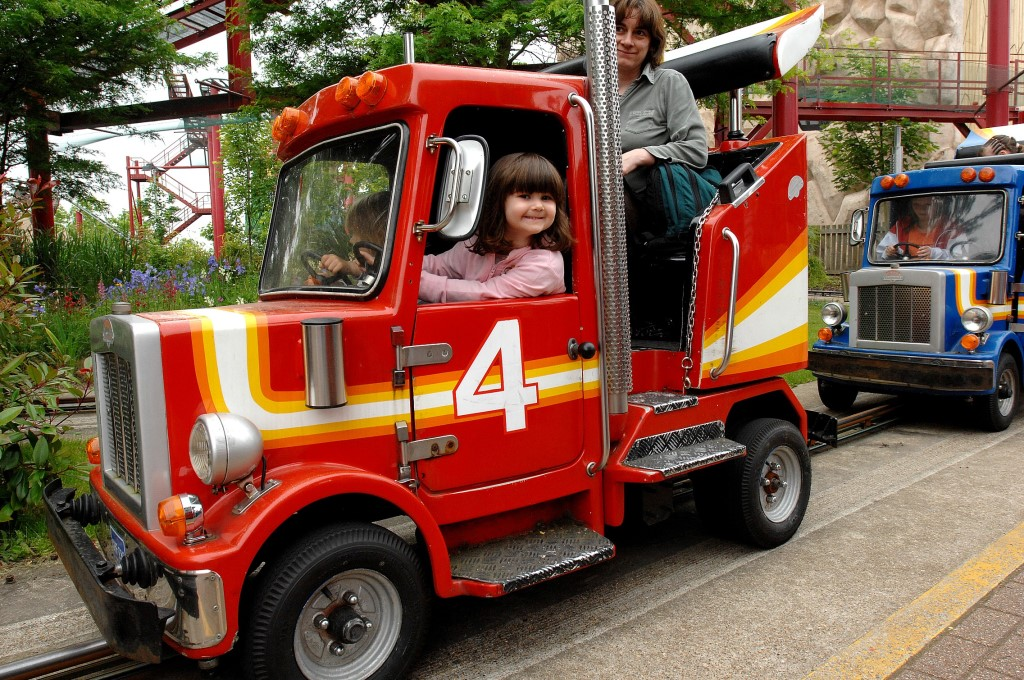

Chessington World of Adventures
- Area: Adventure Point area
- Status: Operating
- Opening date: 1993

Ride statistics
- Attraction type: Convoy ride
- Manufacturer: Zamperla
- Theme: Truck driving
- Duration: 2 minutes
- Reserve and Ride available
- Wheelchair accessible

Tiny Truckers is a children's rail ride operated at Chessington World of Adventures Resort in London. Originally opened in 1993 under the name ToyTown Truckers. As of May 2023, the ride continues to operate.

== History ==
Tiny Truckers was manufactured by Zamperla for Chessington World of Adventures Resort in London in 1993. It opened in the area of ToyTown, and later moved to the Adventure Point.

== Description ==
Set on a powered track in Adventure Point, the ride makes its way around the winding track, with green scenery and Dragon's Fury overhead. There is no age limit, though children under 1.1 metre in height must be accompanied by an adult.

== See also ==
- Chessington World of Adventures Resort
