= Wannado City =

Role-playing amusement center in Florida

- The Wannado City "sign" logo
- Interactive map of Wannado City
- Location: Sunrise, Florida, U.S.
- Coordinates: 26.1498°N 80.3240°W
- Status: Defunct
- Opened: Spring 2004
- Closed: January 12, 2011
- Owner: Grupo CIE
- Slogan: Where kids can do what they wanna' do.
- Operating season: Year-round
- Area: 140,000 sq ft (13,000 m^{2})
- Website: www.wannadocity.com at the Wayback Machine (archived December 23, 2010)

Wannado City was an indoor role-playing amusement center at the Sawgrass Mills in Sunrise, Florida, a suburb of Fort Lauderdale, Florida. It was a property of Grupo CIE. Proclaiming itself as a place "where kids can do what they wanna do", it was a child-sized representation of a metropolis, where children aged 2–14 could participate in different careers and other lifelike activities.

Luis Javier Laresgoiti Fernandez created the concept in 1996, when he opened a similar park in Mexico City named "La Ciudad de los Niños", now known as KidZania. Luis sold his shares and left Kidzania to open Wannado City at Sawgrass Mills Mall in Florida.

The initial success of Wannado City led to plans of expansion, with the partnership of the Mills Corporation, including expanding to Japan, a second US location in the then-in development Meadowlands Xanadu in New Jersey (owned by Mills at the time, now known as the shopping mall American Dream Meadowlands), Gurnee Mills, and in a development project in downtown Chicago, Illinois.

Financial problems would begin around a year after opening, when Hurricane Wilma made landfall in Florida, affecting South Florida's tourism market and causing local schools to cancel field trips, delivering a blow to revenue. Coincidentally, the Mills Corporation, Wannado City's main expansion partner, began to be investigated by the U.S. Securities and Exchange Commission (SEC) for accounting errors, and by 2007, was facing bankruptcy before being acquired by Simon Property Group. While they were still signaling an upcoming expansion, that would never come to be. On top of that, while attendance targets were claimed to be exceeded, they were far from being met, and Wannado City fell behind on its tax payments. At one point, Wannado City was even facing an account freeze from the Internal Revenue Service (IRS) before they paid the taxes they owed.

Luis left Wannado City in 2008, and started a new business named "Kandu", focusing on licensing a smaller hybrid model of Wannado City.

Careers in which the "kidizens" could participate included but were not limited to firefighter, police officer, lawyer, physician, TV reporter, singer, actor, and model. They could also use issued money, "Wongas", to set up bank accounts.

Due to financial problems and lack of business, Wannado City was sold by Stampler Auctions on January 11, 2011. Wannado City closed on January 12, 2011. It was eventually replaced by a shopping area, "Fashion Row", in 2013.

== Overview ==
=== Money system ===
The system functioned by the idea of participation in different activities, gaining capital and spending their earnings in luxurious locations such as the Wonka Factory, The Coca-Cola Bottling Plant, a Publix supermarket, the Wannado City Fair and a permanent circus. Guests were granted 150 Wongas upon their arrival and were awarded 20 Wongas for each activity. There were also ATMs where guests could withdraw money or make a deposit at a State Farm bank, so that guests would not have to carry their money around. Children were given "ATM cards" so that they are able to deposit and withdraw more efficiently. The "ATM cards" were discontinued in 2006.

=== Careers ===
The city hosted numerous job occupations available for selection. Children could star in their own television newscast, join the city's fire or police department, the Miami Herald and the Spirit Airlines Flight Academy. The city also hosted a theater, circus, hospital, movie studio, recording studio, courthouse, bakery, dentistry office, public park, library, mine, and an archaeological/paleontological site, among other locations.

== Security ==
Upon arrival, the children and parents were given RFID security bracelets. Throughout the park there were computer stands where a person would place their bracelet against a scanner and details of any known individual's location were shown.

== See also ==
- Enterprise Village, a similar educational program in Pinellas County, Florida
