= Rungra People's Pleasure Ground =

Park in North Korea

- Interactive map of Rungra People's Pleasure Ground
- Location: Rungra Island, Pyongyang, North Korea
- Coordinates: 39°2′26″N 125°45′57″E
- Opened: 2012
- Operating season: Year-round

- Rungra People's Pleasure Ground
- Chosŏn'gŭl: 릉라인민유원지
- Hancha: 綾羅人民遊園地
- Revised Romanization: Reungna Inmin Yuwonji
- McCune–Reischauer: Rŭngna Inmin Yuwŏnji

The Rungra People's Pleasure Ground is an amusement park located in Rungra Island, Pyongyang, North Korea. It was opened in 2012 in a ceremony with Kim Jong Un and his wife Ri Sol-ju. It has a dolphinarium, swimming pool, arcade, mini golf course, fun fair, and courts for tennis, badminton, and volleyball. The park has been expanded many times over the years and now has its own trolley transportation system.

The park entrance fee was 2000 won in 2012, equivalent to around USD20 at the official exchange rate or USD0.25 at the black market rate.

== See also ==
- List of amusement parks in North Korea
