= Dennebrœucq =

Dennebrœucq Denebroek
- Commune
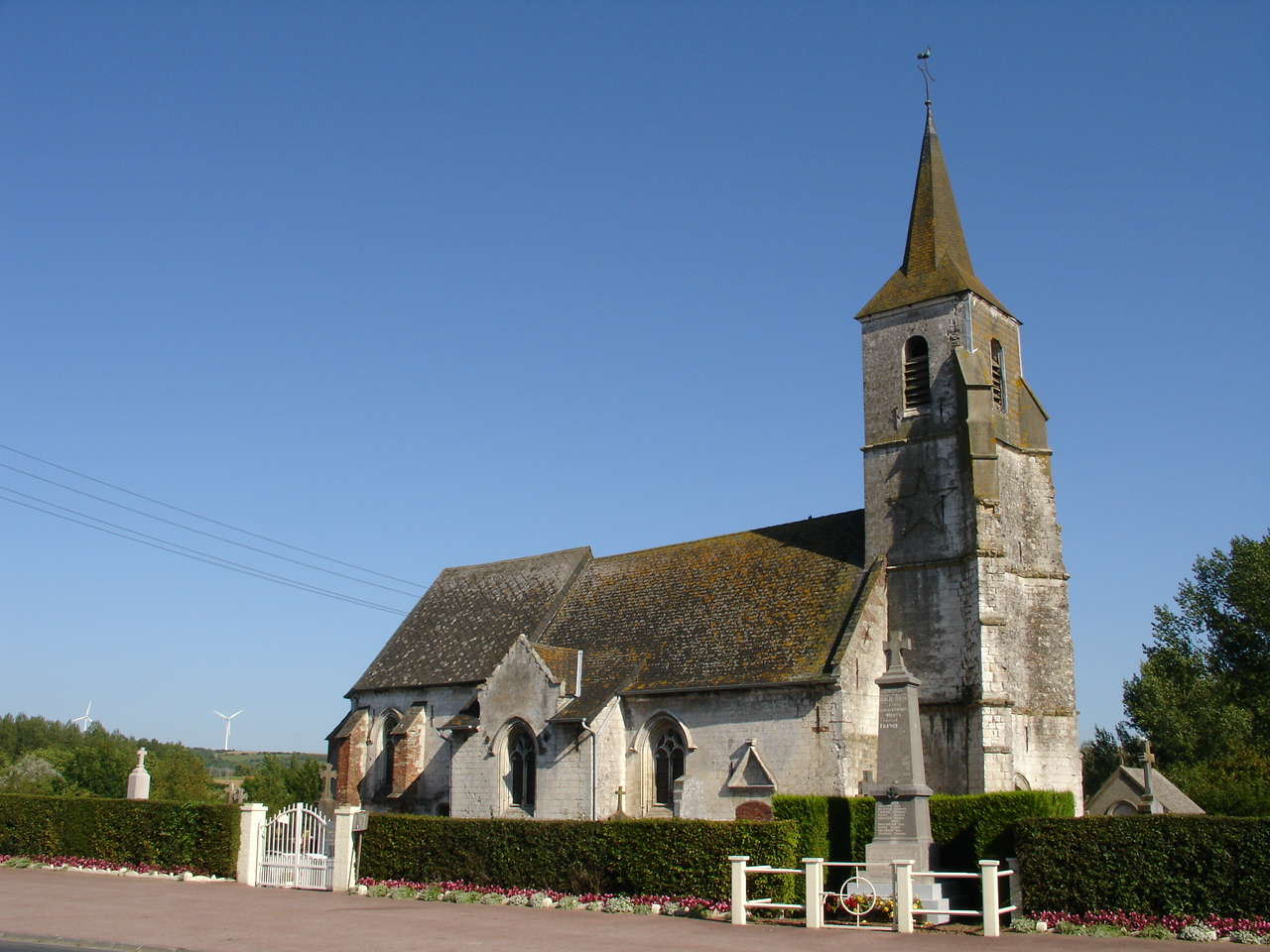
- The church of Dennebrœucq

- Coat of arms
- Location of Dennebrœucq
- Location within France Location within Hauts-de-France
- Coordinates: 50°34′27″N 2°09′14″E
- Country: France
- Region: Hauts-de-France
- Department: Pas-de-Calais
- Arrondissement: Saint-Omer
- Canton: Fruges
- Intercommunality: Pays de Saint-Omer

Government
  - Mayor (2020–2026): Christian Crunelle
- Area^{1}: 3.73 km^{2} (1.44 sq mi)
- Elevation: 70 m (230 ft)
- Highest elevation: 140 m (460 ft)
- Lowest elevation: 53 m (174 ft)
- Population (2023): 391
  - Density: 105/km^{2} (271/sq mi)
- Time zone: UTC+01:00 (CET)
  - Summer (DST): UTC+02:00 (CEST)
- INSEE/Postal code: 62267 /62560
- ^{1} French Land Register data, which excludes lakes, ponds, glaciers > 1 km^{2} (0.386 sq mi or 247 acres) and river estuaries.

Dennebrœucq (French pronunciation: [dɛnbʁœk]; West Flemish: Denebroek) is a commune in the Pas-de-Calais department in the Hauts-de-France region of France 12 miles (19 km) south of Saint-Omer The medieval Flemish name was Denebroek

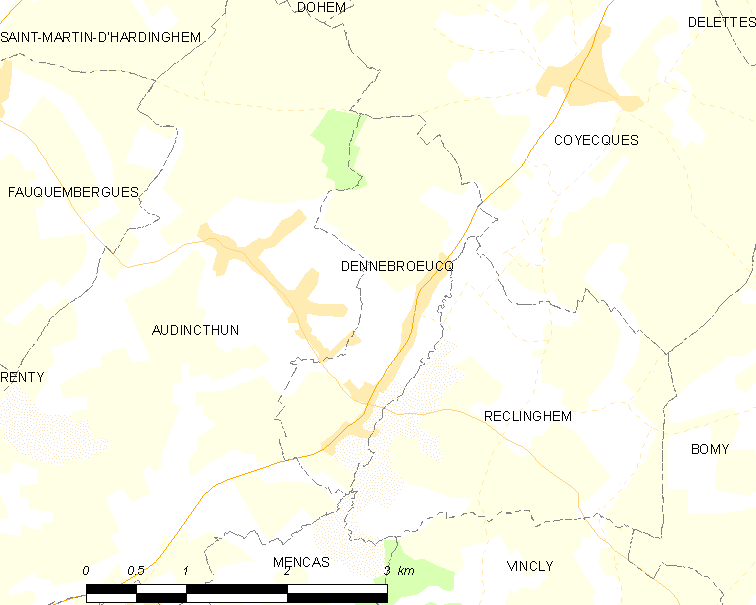
Map of the commune and adjacent places

== Population ==
Historical population
Year	Pop.	±% p.a.
1968	279	—
1975	257	−1.17%
1982	269	+0.65%
1990	310	+1.79%
1999	314	+0.14%
2007	356	+1.58%
2012	369	+0.72%
2017	389	+1.06%
2023	391	+0.09%
Source: INSEE

== See also ==
- Communes of the Pas-de-Calais department
