= Universal Kids Resort Hotel =

Universal Kids Resort themed Hotel in Frisco, Texas

General information
- Location: Frisco, Texas
- Opening: July 1, 2026
- Owner: NBCUniversal

Technical details
- Floor count: 5

Other information
- Number of rooms: 300

Website
- Official website

The Universal Kids Resort Hotel is a resort-style hotel, by NBCUniversal, located in Frisco, Texas. It opened on July 1, 2026.

== History ==
Universal Kids Resort Hotel opened on July 1, 2026, where a multi-colored, five-story building houses 300 themed guest rooms, 5 floors, and suites, and it sits directly adjacent to the theme park and serves as its main entrance, with security screening and turnstiles located in a ground-level walkway that runs underneath the building.
