= Vekoma wooden roller coaster =

Wooden roller coaster model

The Vekoma Wooden roller coaster is a model of wooden roller coaster built by Vekoma.

== Installations ==
Name	Model	Park	Country	Opened	Status	Ref
Robin Hood	Wooden Coaster	Walibi Holland	Netherlands	2000	Converted; Now known as Untamed	
Loup-Garou	Wooden Coaster	Walibi Belgium	Belgium	2001	Operating	
Thundercoaster	Wooden Coaster	TusenFryd	Norway	2001	Operating	
