= Vinterbro =

Coordinates: 59.7438°N 10.7878°E

- Village
- Location in Akershus
- Country: Norway
- Region: Østlandet
- County: Akershus

Population
  - Total: 3 000
- Time zone: UTC+01:00 (CET)
  - Summer (DST): UTC+02:00 (CEST)

Vinterbro is a village in the municipality of Ås, Akershus, Norway. It has 3,000 residents in the subdivisions Togrenda and Sjøskogen. The area features two primary schools and four kindergartens.

This is the location of a large shopping area, including a Steen & Strøm shopping center. The amusement park Tusenfryd and part of the Oslo Tramway Museum is also located at Vinterbro. European Route E6 and E18 run past the area. Part of the E6 was financed by Oslo Package 1.
