= Odd Tandberg =

Norwegian painter and printmaker

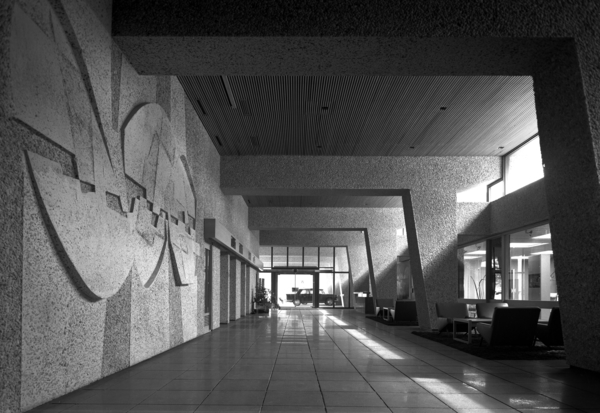
- artwork
- Born: 16 April 1924; Ås, Akershus, Norway
- Died: 13 February 2017 (aged 92)
- Occupations: Printmaker, painter

Odd Tandberg (16 April 1924 – 13 February 2017), was a Norwegian painter and printmaker.

== Biography ==
Odd Tandberg was born in Oslo. He studied at Bjarne Engebrets' painting school in 1941, and then at the Norwegian National Academy of Craft and Art Industry from 1942 to 1945. He also studied at the Norwegian National Academy of Fine Arts under Axel Revold and Per Krohg from 1945 to 1946.

In his decorative works, he used sandblasted natural concrete, conglomur, and concrete with ferrosilicon aggregates in the 1950s, 1960s, and early 1970s.

In 2007, Tandberg was decorated as a Knight, First Class of the Order of St. Olav, for his efforts as a visual artist.

== Gallery ==
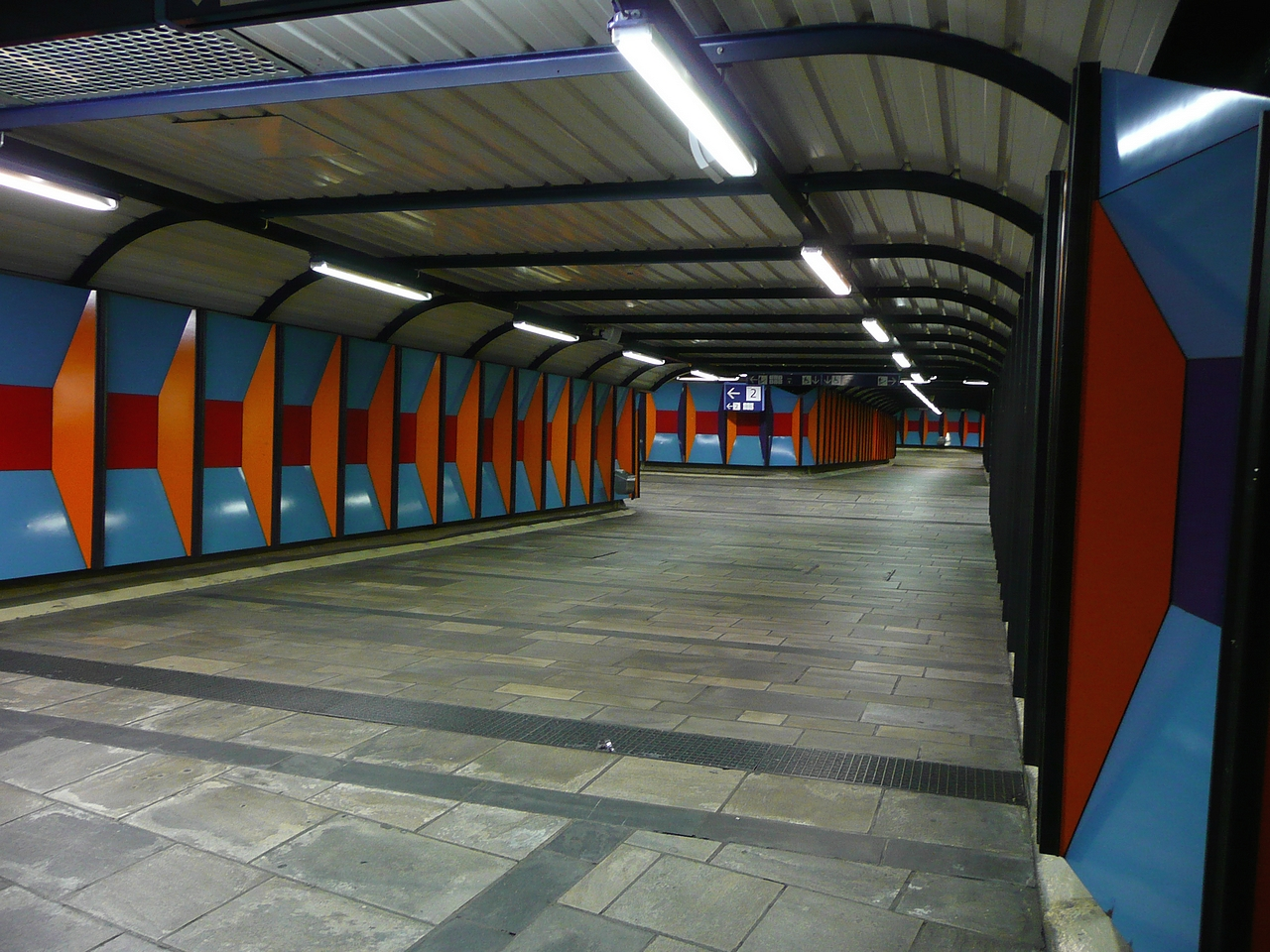
Stortinget station. Odd Tandberg's decorations (1977).

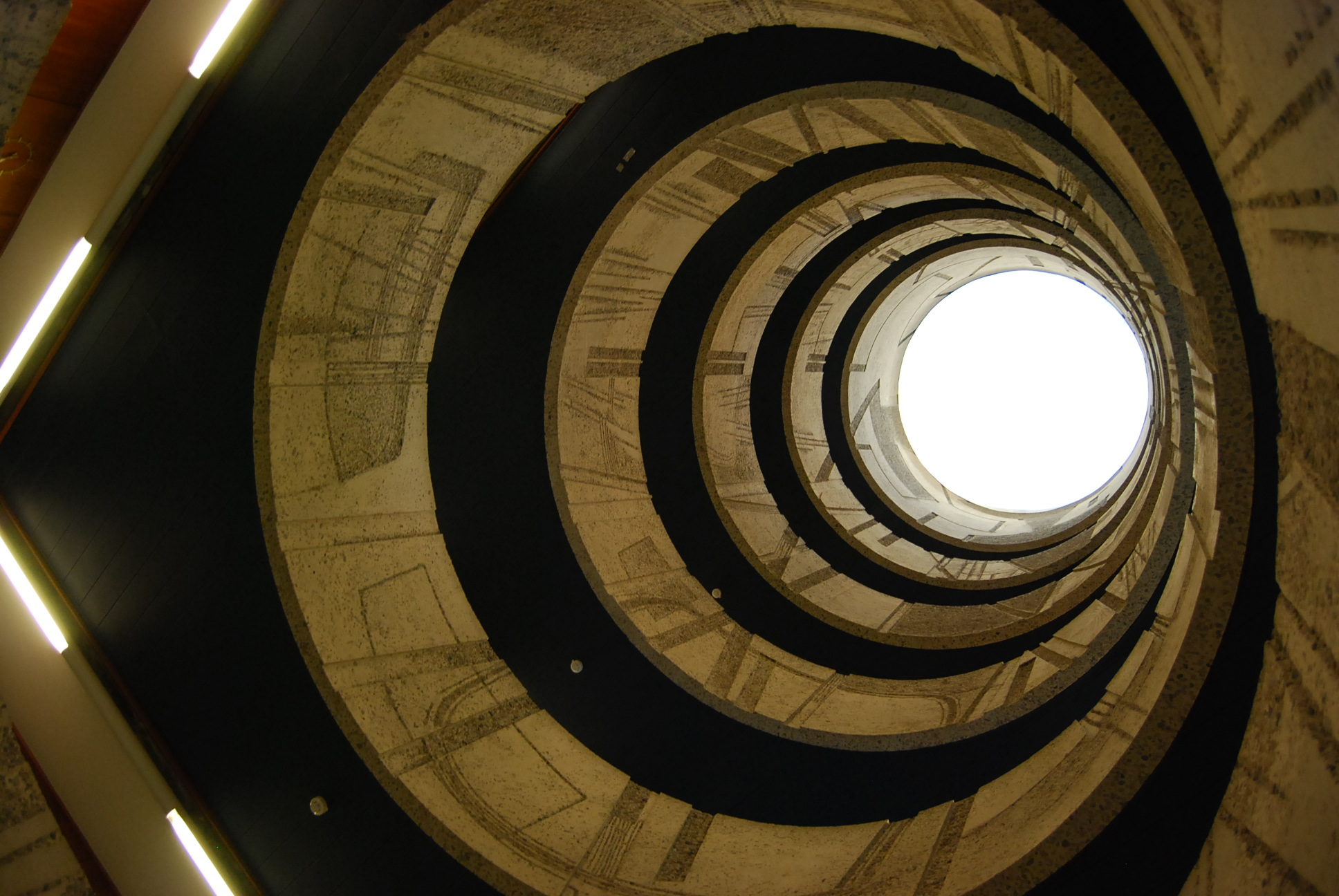
The NVE building.

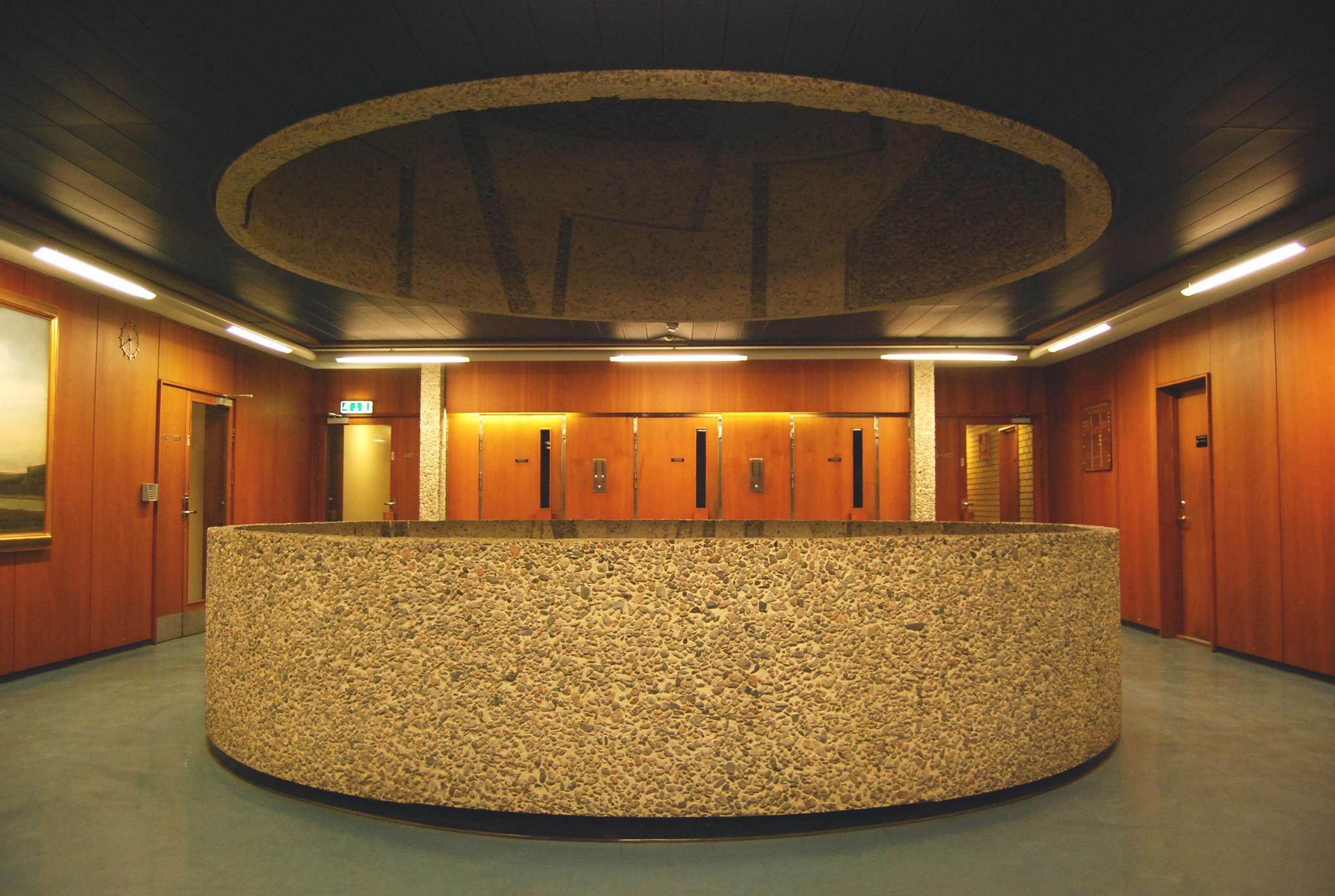
The NVE building. Decorated by Odd Tandberg

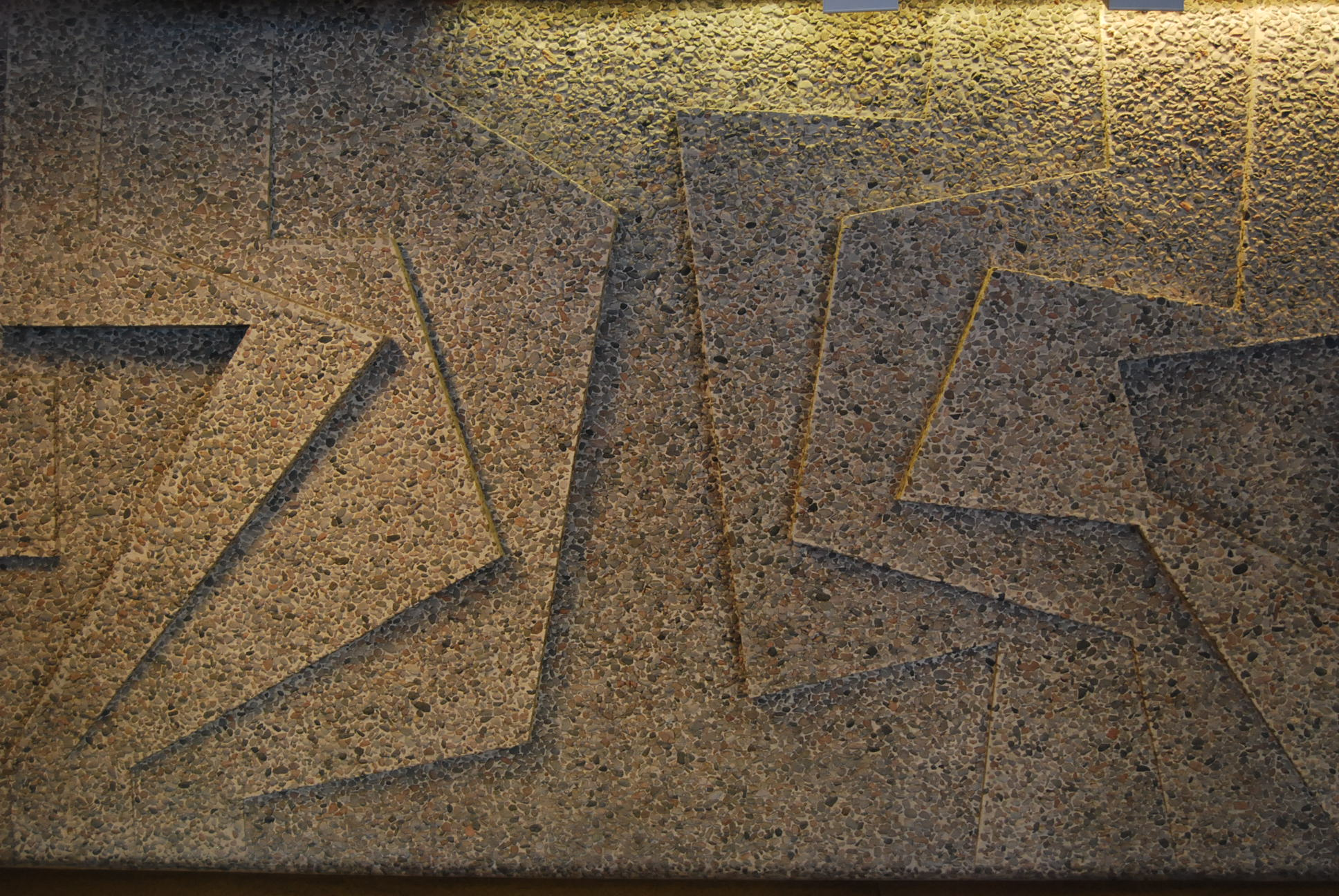
The NVE building.

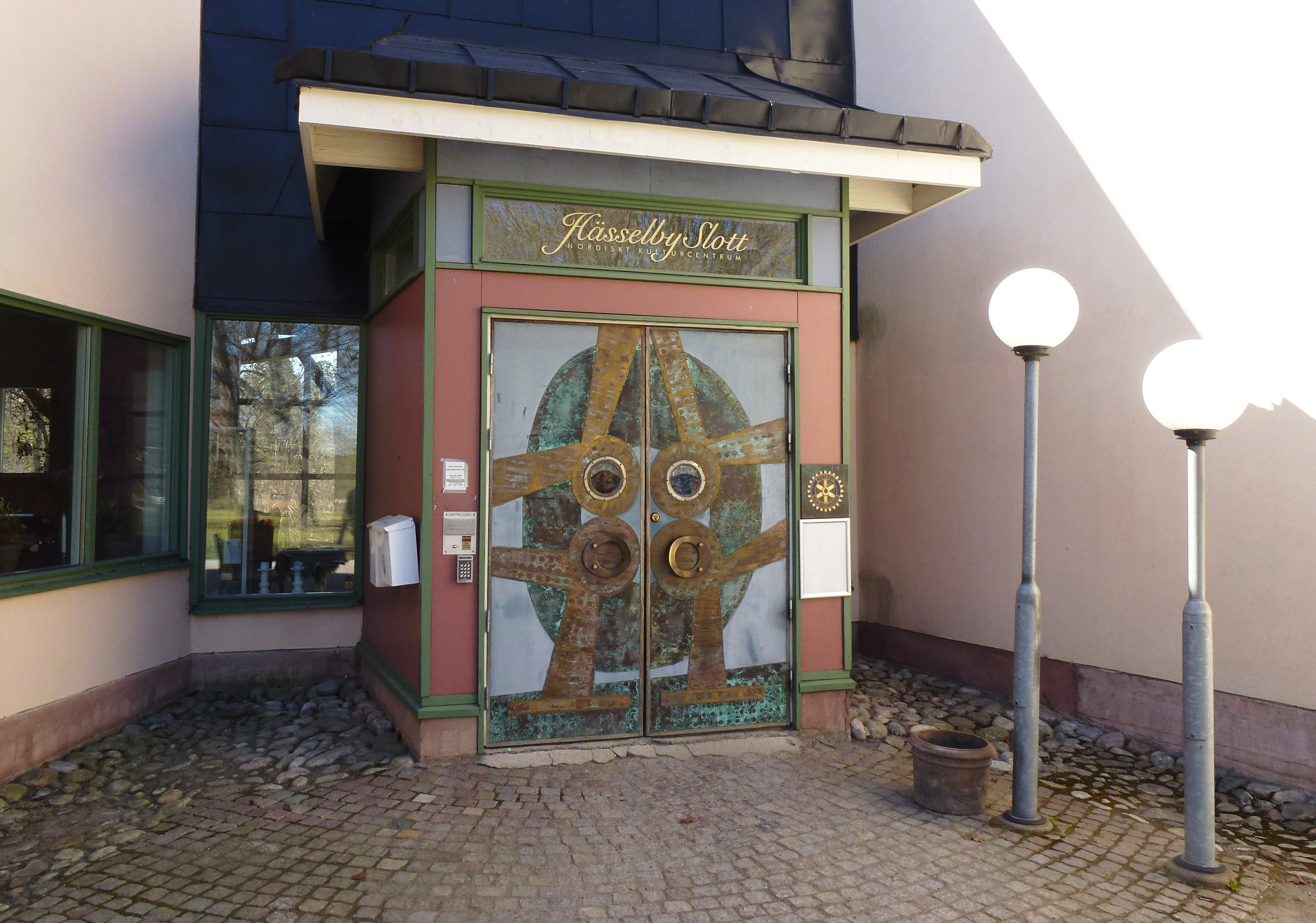
Hässelby Castle, entrance door designed by Odd Tandberg, 1985.
