= Vebjørn Sand Da Vinci Project =

Pedestrian bridge in Norway

da Vinci Bridge da Vinci-Broen
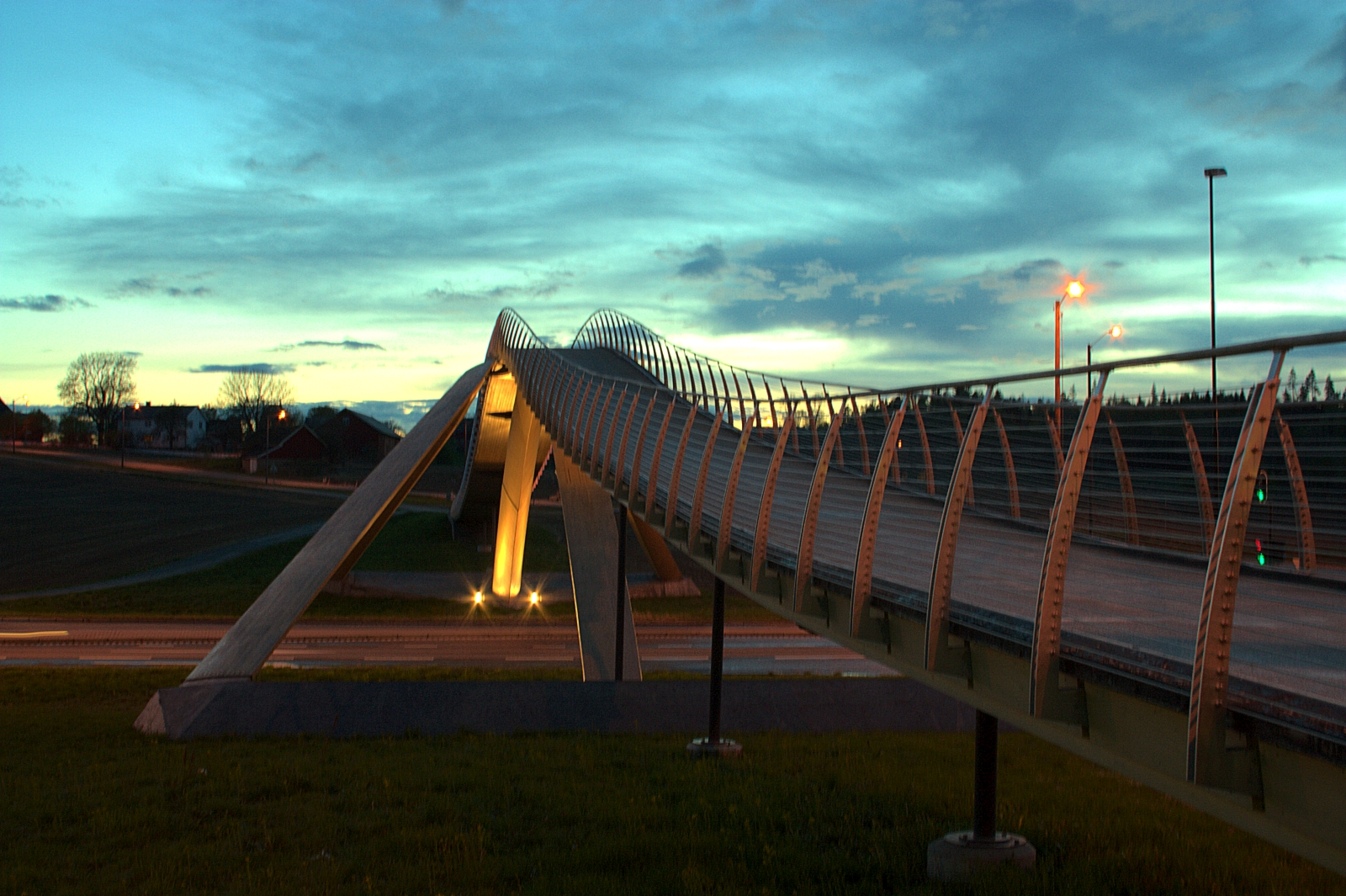
- The da Vinci bridge in Ås
- Coordinates: 59°43′08″N 10°47′03″E
- Carries: pedestrian and bicycle traffic
- Crosses: Highway E-18
- Locale: Nygård, Ås, Akershus; Norway
- Named for: Leonardo da Vinci
- Owner: Norwegian Public Roads Administration

Characteristics
- Design: Deck arch bridge
- Material: Laminated wood; steel-reinforced
- Total length: 109 m (358 ft)
- Longest span: 40 m (130 ft)

History
- Architect: Vebjørn Sand; Selberg Architects
- Designer: Leonardo da Vinci
- Engineering design by: AFRY (Reinertsen Engineering)
- Construction start: 1997
- Construction end: 2000
- Construction cost: 13 million Norwegian kroner
- Opened: 2000

Location
- Interactive map of da Vinci Bridge

The Vebjørn Sand da Vinci Project built a laminated-wood parabolic-arch pedestrian bridge in Norway over European route E18 in Ås, Norway, in 2000. It was a partnership between the Norwegian Public Roads Administration and the Norwegian painter and artist Vebjørn Sand, who headed the project. The resulting da Vinci Bridge is one of several installations for which Sand is known in Norway. The bridge is based on a 1502 design by Leonardo da Vinci for a bridge over the Golden Horn in modern-day Istanbul.

== History ==
=== Original design ===
Leonardo da Vinci proposed a bridge 240 m (790 ft) long, overall and 24 m (79 ft) wide over the Golden Horn in 1502 for Sultan Bayezid II of Constantinople (today's Istanbul). The sketch and proposal letter were lost for over 400 years before being rediscovered in 1952. The proposed bridge included a 240 m (790 ft) "pressed bow" main span with 43 m (141 ft) of vertical clearance to allow ships to pass. Leonardo bragged that "it has been [the Sultan's] intention to erect a bridge from Galata (Pera) to Stambul… across the Golden Horn (‘Haliç’), but this has not been done because there were no experts available. I, your subject, have determined how to build the bridge. It will be a masonry bridge as high as a building, and even tall ships will be able to sail under it." The sketch was confirmed to be a genuine work of Leonardo by comparison with an identical sketch in Manuscript L, part of the Paris Manuscripts stored in the Institut de France in Paris.

Had the 1502 design been implemented, it would have been the longest bridge in the world, and it would still be the longest single masonry arch span in the world. Leonardo is said to have been inspired by the then newly built bridge Ponte degli Alidosi over Santerno at Castel del Rio near Bologna with a 42 m high semicircular arch.

In 2019, a research team at the Massachusetts Institute of Technology tested the stability of Leonardo's design by building a 1:500 scale model using only blocks without using fasteners or mortar, replicating contemporary masonry construction techniques. The bridge was first analyzed using a 3D model, then divided into 126 individual blocks which were individually printed, consuming approximately 6 hours per block. Falsework was used to temporarily support the blocks during construction of the scale model. After the falsework was removed, the model proved to be stable under load, and the spread-footing design proposed by Leonardo was able to resist movement of the foundation.

=== Implemented in Ås ===
The Norwegian artist Vebjørn Sand saw Leonardo's Haliç bridge sketch in 1996 and proposed that the bridge should be implemented by the Norwegian Public Roads Administration (NPRA). Since the NPRA had a policy to consider the artistic merits of public structures, a new structure was approved in 1997 to replace "Norway's ugliest bridge". Several alternative materials were considered for the bridge, including the as-designed stone and concrete, but ultimately the timber version was selected for construction. Moelven Laminated Group, who had constructed the world's largest wooden roof for Håkons Hall in Lillehammer for the 1994 Winter Olympics, was selected to supply glued laminated timber (glulam) for the new da Vinci Bridge.

The da Vinci Bridge, completed in 2001, serves as a pedestrian crossing over highway E18 in Ås, approximately 20 kilometres (12 mi) from Oslo. It was built from large prefabricated glulam sections moved in place by cranes, with three parabolic arches in the main span: a central arch supporting the pathway and two stabilizing arches flanking it. The main span is 40 m (130 ft) and the bridge is 109 m (358 ft) long, overall at a total cost of approximately 12 million Norwegian kroner. The completed da Vinci Bridge was built wide enough to allow four lanes of traffic underneath, but requirements for vertical clearance have increased and adding lanes of traffic would require lowering the road. The bridge was opened by Queen Sonja in a November 2001 ceremony using cranes to lift a white cloth draped over the bridge, literally unveiling it to the public.

Since its unveiling, the da Vinci Bridge has attracted attention in the New York Times. Wired called it one of the five coolest bridges on earth in 2005, along with the Rio–Antirrio bridge, the Seri Wawasan Bridge, the Dongting Lake Bridge and the Juscelino Kubitschek Bridge.

=== Global Leonardo Bridge Project ===
The Oslo Leonardo Bridge Project opened in October 2001. The project hopes to apply the design to build practical footbridges around the world using local materials and local artisans as a global public art project. Future plans, announced in 2012, include a bridge over the Golden Horn in Istanbul, as Leonardo had proposed. Sand was quoted by the Wall Street Journal describing the Bridge Project as a "... logo for all the nations."

A small pedestrian Leonardo bridge was erected in 2016 at the Château du Clos Lucé, Leonardo's home for the last years of his life. Other permanent Leonardo bridges have been proposed for several locations, although these plans have not come to fruition:

- Des Moines, Iowa (1998), rejected as the design was said to be "too modern"
- Arlington, Virginia (2002) to replace the old Doubleday Bridge over Spout Run Parkway
- Roosevelt Island, New York City (2012)

Several temporary Leonardo bridges have been built in ice since the completion of the da Vinci Bridge in Norway:

- Queen Maud Land, Antarctica (2006), with the intention that it does not melt due to climate change
- UN Plaza in New York City (2007), approximately 30 feet (9.1 m) long
- Ilulissat on Disko Bay in Greenland (2009)
- Christiansborg Palace Square in Copenhagen (2009), a 52-foot (16 m) span for COP15
- Juuka, Finland (planned 2016), a project led by the Eindhoven University of Technology to build a scale model of the 1502 bridge proposal using pykrete

== Gallery ==
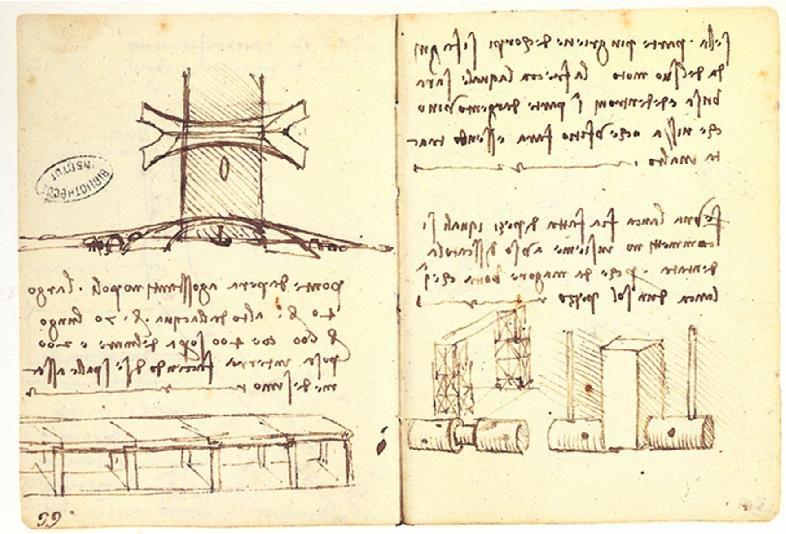
Golden Horn Bridge designed by Leonardo da Vinci in 1502

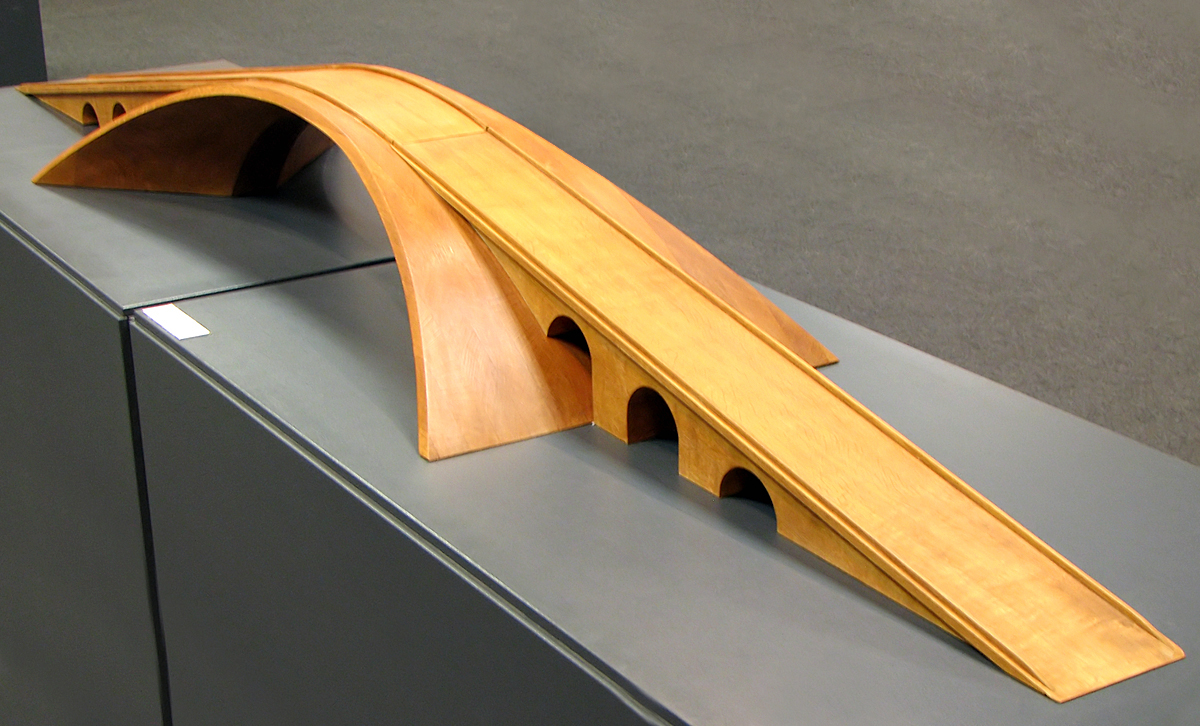
Wooden model of Leonardo's Golden Horn bridge

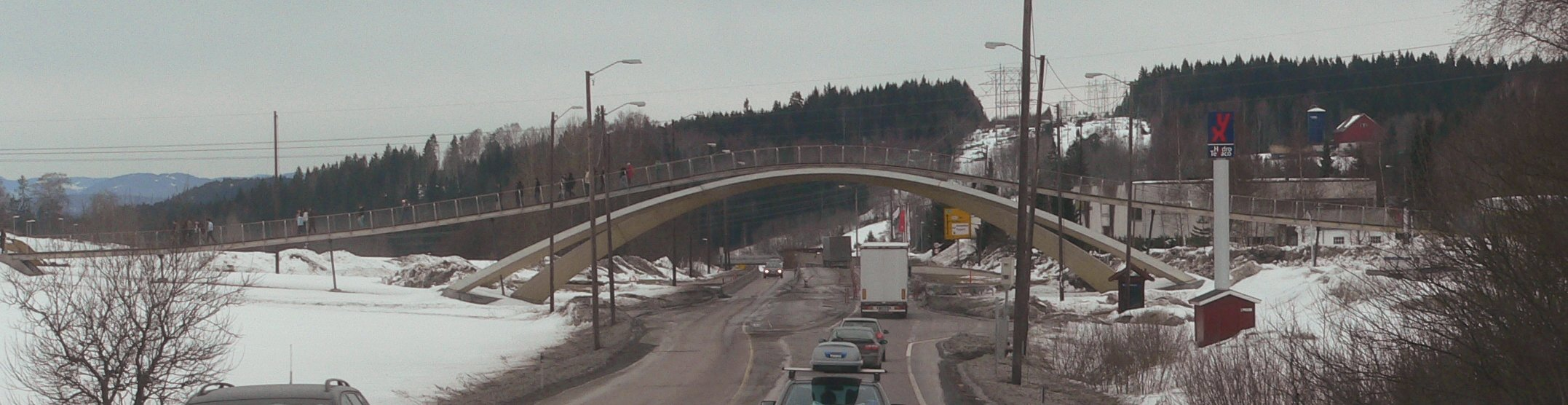
Completed da Vinci bridge, side view

== See also ==
- Leonardo's horse
