= Thundercoaster (TusenFryd) =

Roller coaster at TusenFryd, Norway

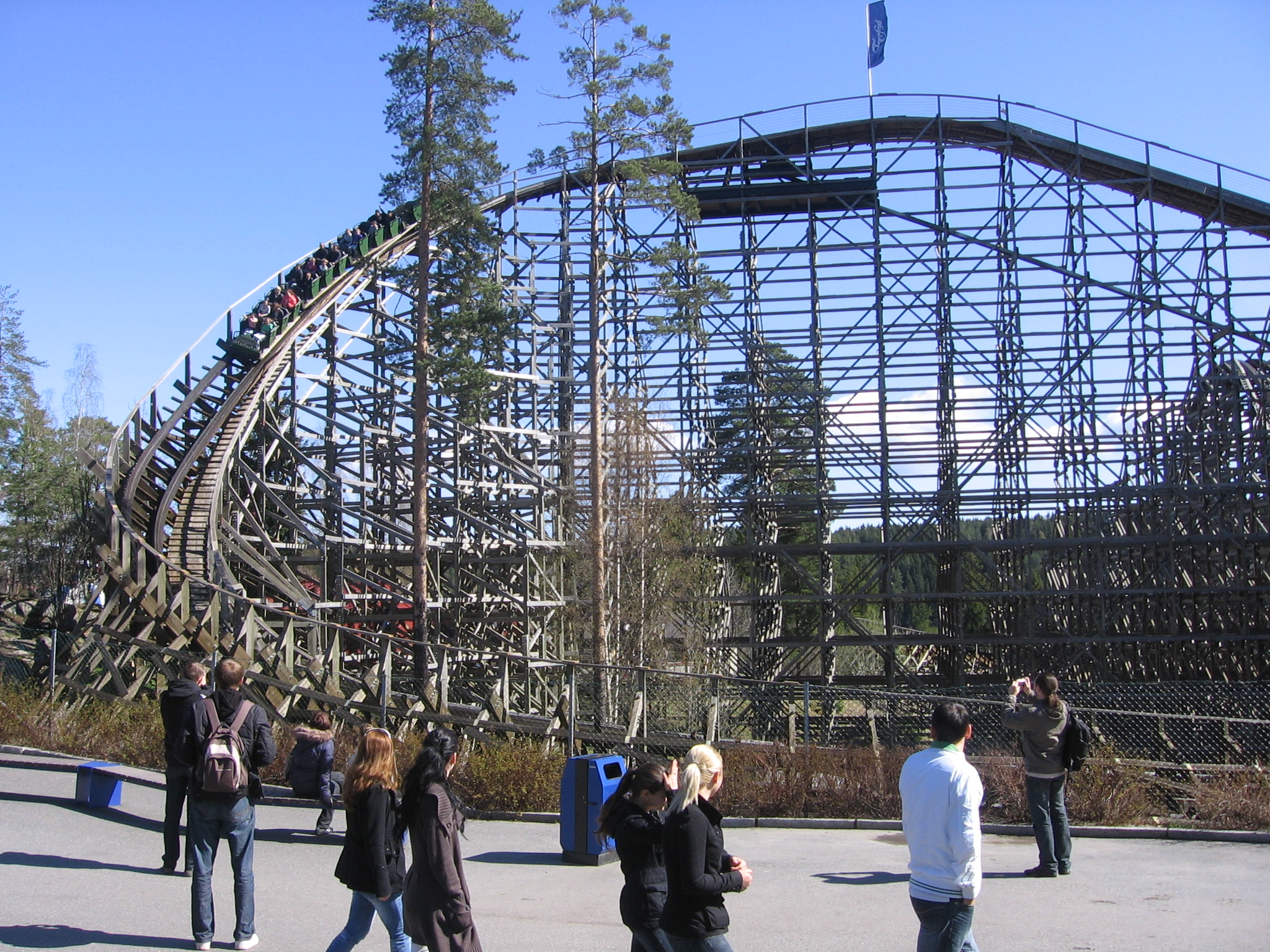

TusenFryd
- Location: TusenFryd
- Coordinates: 59.7472°N 10.7773°E
- Status: Operating
- Opening date: 1 May 2001

General statistics
- Type: Wood
- Manufacturer: Vekoma
- Lift/launch system: Chain lift hill
- Drop: 32 m (105 ft)
- Length: 950 m (3,120 ft)
- Speed: 93 km/h (58 mph)
- Inversions: 0
- Duration: 2:00
- Max vertical angle: 57.3°
- G-force: 2.3
- Trains: 2 trains with 12 cars; riders arranged 2 across in a single row for a total of 24 riders per train
- Thundercoaster at RCDB

Thundercoaster is a wooden roller coaster located at TusenFryd in Vinterbro, Norway. Manufactured by Dutch manufacturer Vekoma, it opened on 1 May 2001 and features a drop of 32 metres (105 ft), a maximum speed of 93 kilometres per hour (58 mph), and a track length of 950 metres (3,120 ft). It is Norway's only wooden roller coaster.

== Characteristics ==
=== Track ===
Thundercoaster's track is 950 metres (3,120 ft) in length and features a maximum drop of 32 metres (105 ft) at an angle of 57.4 degrees. The ride reaches a maximum speed of 93 kilometres per hour (58 mph). One cycle of the ride lasts approximately two minutes.

=== Trains ===
Thundercoaster originally ran with trains from Vekoma. Each train had four cars seating six riders each in two rows of two. However, for the 2015 season, these trains were replaced by Timberliner trains from Cincinnati, Ohio-based Gravitykraft Corporation. The coaster now uses two trains, each of which has 12 cars seating two riders; this allows for a total of 24 riders per train.
