= Fanny Elsta =

Norwegian opera singer (1899–1978)

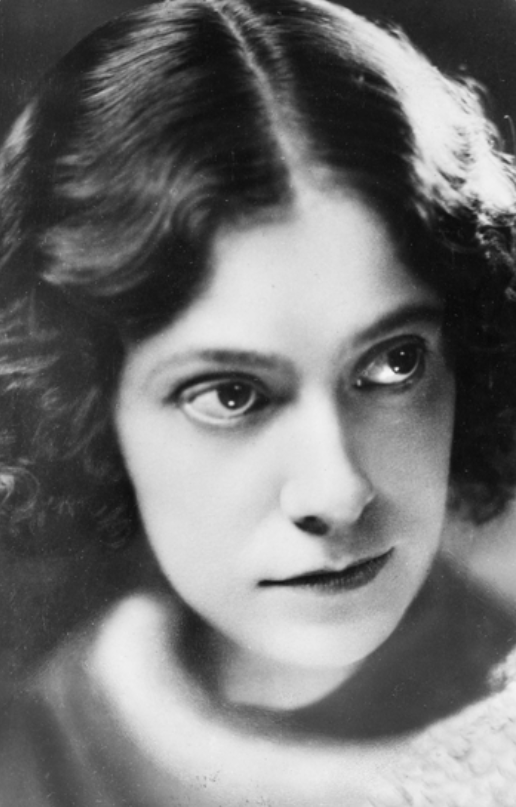
- Born: Fanny Rebekka Elstad; 26 April 1899; Christiania, Norway
- Died: 4 February 1978 (aged 78); Oslo, Norway
- Spouse: Herman Lepsøe (m. 1942)

Fanny Rebekka Elstad (26 April 1899 – 4 February 1978) was a Norwegian opera singer and founder of the Bergen International Festival.

== Early life ==
Fanny Rebekka Elstad was born on 26 April 1899 to engineer and mineralogist Sigvard Elstad (1870–1928) and midwife Martha Winhuus (1864–1940) in Christiania (now Oslo), but grew up in Ås, Akershus. She was the youngest of three sisters. Her father's ambitious plans to earn money from precious stones and metals did not materialise, and he lived in the United States for most of Elsta's childhood, while her mother supported the family by running a boarding house. Elsta also received financial support from her sister's father-in-law, farmer and factory owner Hans Hoelstad, which allowed her to take singing lessons with Mally Lammers in Christiania from 1920 to 1924.

== Career ==
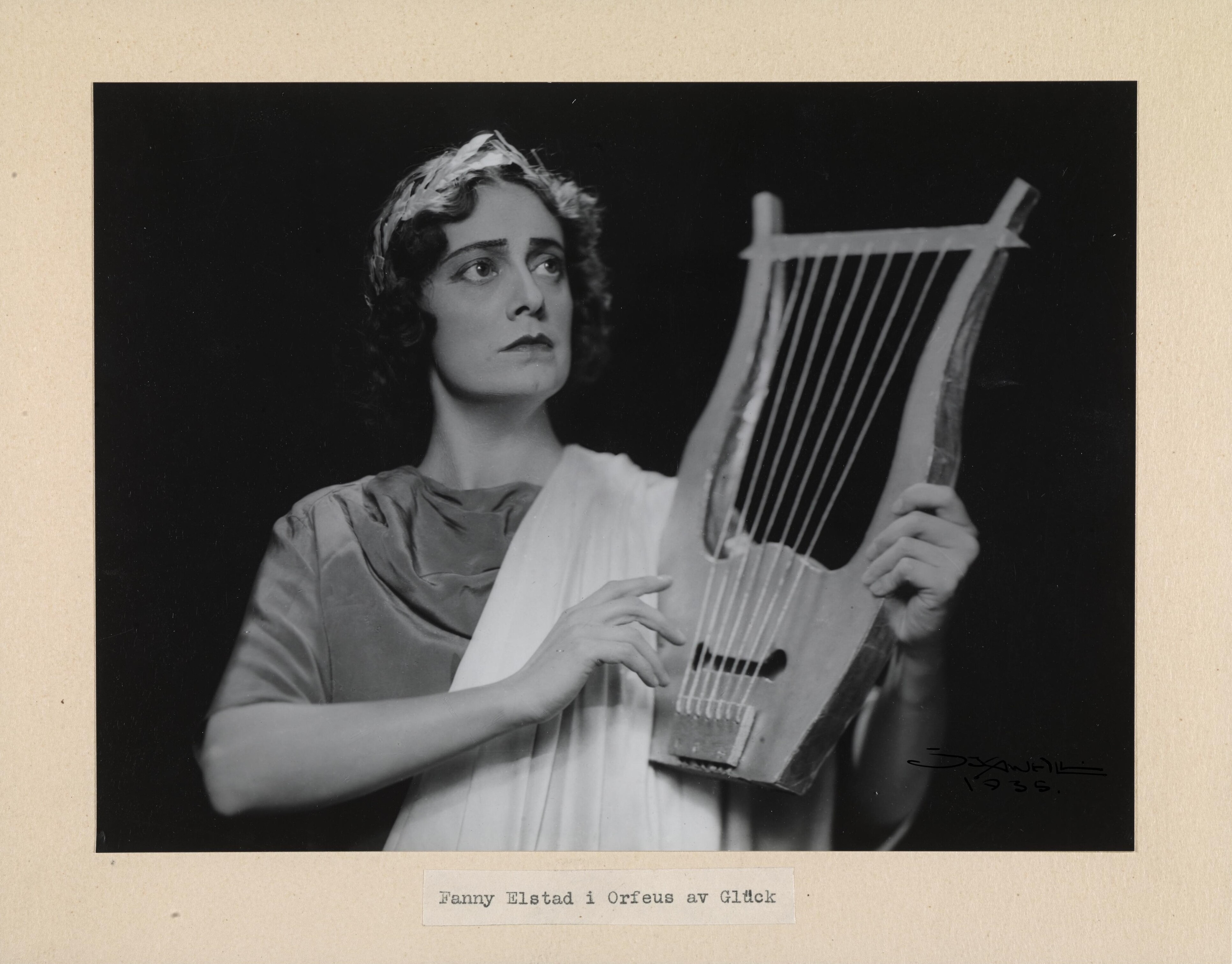
Fanny Elsta as Orfeus in Orfeo ed Euridice at the Centralteatret in 1935

Her debut concert was at the University Aula (a performance and exhibition hall at the University of Oslo) on 24 February 1924. She sang songs by Franz Schubert and Thorvald Lammers, and her performance was well received. Elsta then received a grant from the Lammers Fund, and she further developed with voice with Ellen Gulbranson as her teacher. She would also later study with Antonino Votto in Milan and with Sara Cahier from 1935.

Following her debut, she participated in various oratorio performances. Elsta made her debut as an opera singer in 1932 as Magdalena in Wilhelm Kienzl's Der Evangelimann. Another Lammers scholarship in 1932 was used for trips to Berlin, Vienna and Salzburg. She performed Norwegian songs on Italian and French radio and signed contracts for guest appearances. During this trip, she dropped the "d" from her surname and started using the stage name Fanny Elsta.

In April 1933, Elsta performed in one of the Philharmonic Society's orchestral concerts with songs by Emil Sjögren and Ture Rangström and in a concert performance of Christian Sinding's opera Der Heilige Berg. In February 1935, her performance as Orfeus in Karl Aagaard Østvig's staging of Christoph Willibald Gluck's Orfeo ed Euridice at the Centralteatret was lauded and she reprised the role in 1946 and 1947. After the composer Bruno Walter took an interest in her, Elsta was contracted to sing at the Vienna State Opera from 1936 to 1937. She also performed several times at the Salzburg Festival and at the Bayreuth Festival from 1938 to 1939.

In 1942, she married the cosmetics manufacturer Herman Lepsøe, the son of the Bergen composer Christian Lepsøe, whose songs she had in her repertoire.

In addition to this, she performed concert tours both in Norway and abroad, as well as a tour in the United States in 1947. Among her famous roles were Brangäne in Tristan und Isolde, Erda in Das Rheingold, Fricka in Die Walküre, Walture in Götterdämmerung, Kundry in Parsifal and Amneris in Aida.

During an interview with Norsk Musikkliv in autumn 1949, she proposed a festival in Norway inspired by the Salzburg Festival, with theatre, opera and concerts. In Bergen, there had long been interest in such an idea and her enthusiasm had influenced the city’s mayor, major cultural institutions, and the business community to support it. In response to scepticism, she said "it rains a lot in Bergen, but at least as much in Salzburg!". Elsta and her husband donated 300,000 kroner to the cause. On 6 November 1951, Bergen International Festival Foundation was founded and the first Bergen International Festival took place from 1 to 15 June 1953 and was opened by Haakon VII of Norway.

In 1950, she published the book Boken om Ellen Gulbranson.

== Later life and death ==
Elsta retired in the 1950s and spent her retirement in Oslo. She received the gold King's Medal of Merit in 1957.

Elsta died on 4 February 1978, at the age of 78 in Oslo.
