= Vebjørn Sand =

Norwegian artist (born 1966)

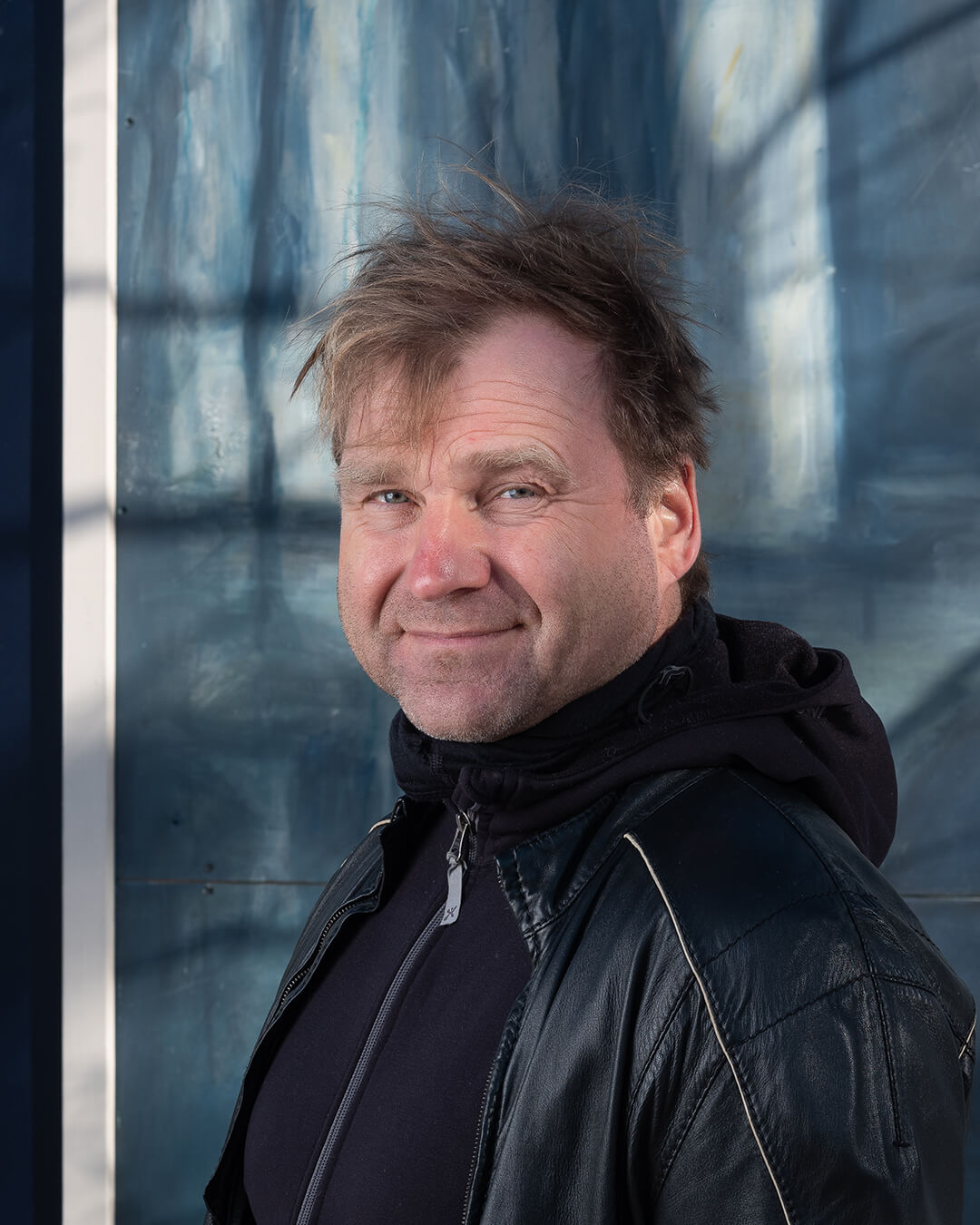
- Born: March 11, 1966 (age 60); Bærum, Norway
- Occupation: Artist

Vebjørn Sand (born March 11, 1966) is a Norwegian painter and artist. He is known for his paintings as well as his public arts projects, such as the Da Vinci Project, and the Kepler Star monument (Norwegian Peace Star) at Oslo Airport, Gardermoen. In 2011, he began his painting series Scenes from the Second World War, followed by Guernica: A Turning Point in 2014.

== Early life and education ==
Vebjørn Sand was born March 11, 1966, in Bærum, Norway, and was raised on the coastal islands of Hvaler where his father Øivind Sand worked as a school teacher and painter at the Waldorf School. His mother Kari Marie Søyland taught at the same school. Thanks to his parents, he grew up surrounded by art, science, design and mathematics. The European Renaissance and the Baroque in particular were an early inspiration for Vebjørn due to the great advancements in art, science, and philosophy during that period.

When he was just 16 years old, Vebjørn toured Norway as a caricature artist, and over the course of three summers he painted approximately 3,000 people. It was only after he left high school in Fredrikstad in 1985, that he started to paint in the classic European tradition and to master his craft, young Vebjorn redrew hundreds of master drawings and copied hundreds of paintings from museums in Europe and the United States. Of this period in his life Vebjørn said,

“[Copying the classics] was an excellent way to improve techniques. I knew that the whole secret was hard work; building stone by stone. One small step at a time. I was fanatic about my craft, and I worked like crazy."

Vebjørn studied under Walther Aas and Rolf Schønfeldt from 1983 to 1986, then enrolled in the Norwegian National Academy of Fine Arts where he spent 1986–88, and then had a one-year stay at the Academy of Fine Arts, Prague before returning to the Academy in Oslo, where he left in 1990. He later studied at the Art Students League of New York.

In 1991 while painting landscapes in Valdres, Vebjørn painted his work Okseryggen with oil paint, which gave him turpentine poisoning. Beset by visual disturbances and chronic headaches, Vebjørn gave up oil paint and began looking for another outlet for his creative expression. Given the poor quality of the alternative acrylic paint at the time, Vebjørn decided that outdoor projects and public art would be his chosen medium.

== Career and work ==
=== Troll Castle ===
After an expedition to Antarctica, Queen Maud Land Vebjørn completed his first public work, The Troll Castle (Trollslottet) which was inspired by the voyage. In collaboration with the team who arranged the opening of the Winter Olympics at Lillehammer in 1994, Vebjørn constructed this “Mini Antarctica” formed by 10 towers surrounding a circle, all reminiscent of Arnesteinen, a mountain shooting out of the ice in the shape of a cathedral.

Inside the castle Vebjørn included paintings conceived and executed in Antarctica, stored inside glass boxes to resemble ice. The castle was designed so that visitors could walk inside the space and experience a frigid atmosphere similar to the one Vebjørn did when he painted them.

During the first 3 months of its opening in the winter of 1997/98, 180,000 people visited the Troll Castle.

=== Kepler Star ===
Vebjørn's next public arts project was the Kepler Star, a permanent 45-meter-high (148 ft) art installation by the Oslo Airport. Created to honor Doctors Without Borders for winning the 1999 Nobel Peace Prize, the star itself is based on a design from Johannes Kepler, further combined with an icosahedron - a polyhedron with 20 faces and one of the five platonic bodies, and consists of a skeleton made of steel with crinkled glass. The star sits on three concrete pillars, thirty meters high; inspired by the Nunataken in Queen Maud Land Vebjørn saw during his expedition to Antarctica in 1996.

Since then, the Kepler Star has seen many uses including being lit pink for breast cancer awareness month in October 2014.

=== Leonardo Da Vinci Bridge ===
In 1996, Vebjørn saw Leonardo da Vinci's sketch of a proposed bridge that would cross the Golden Horn “Haliç” in modern-day Turkey. Sketched in 1502 for Sultan Bayezid II, it would have been 366 m (1,201 ft) long, overall and 24 m (79 ft) wide. Beyazid did not pursue the project, because he believed that such a construction was impossible.

Upon seeing the drawing, Vebjørn said “It was like finding an unplayed symphony of Mozart” and felt compelled to bring it to life. He suggested the bridge be constructed in Norway, and reached out to the Norwegian Public Roads Administration (NPRA).

Construction began the same year and was completed in 2001. This scaled down version of the da Vinci Bridge now serves as a pedestrian and bike crossing over highway E18, 20 kilometres (12 mi) from Oslo, by the nearby village of Ås.

About Vebjørn's ultimate goal with The da Vinci bridge, the Wall Street Journal wrote:

“He wanted not only to unite past with present, but also to remind the world that technology is at its best when it is informed with a sense of the transcendental. He saw his and da Vinci's bridge as ‘a meeting between heaven and earth, between the spiritual and the material realms.’”

Nearly 500 years after da Vinci’s original sketch, the bridge was officially opened by Queen Sonja in November 2001. Vebjørn, noticing that mostly men were opening public works at the time, specifically chose the Queen to open the bridge - a gesture she mentioned in her remarks. Of its completion Vebjørn said,

“It just had to be built. This has taken years of effort. The bridge is such a beautiful mixture between the functional and the aesthetic."

Since that unveiling, the Da Vinci Bridge has experienced international acclaim, being featured in publications such as the New York Times, the Wall Street Journal, the Guardian, Travel + Leisure and many more. It was also named one of the five coolest bridges on earth by Wired magazine.

Several more Da Vinci bridges were constructed by Vebjørn Sand including temporary ice ones to raise awareness for climate change.

=== The Golden Horn Bridge ===
To bring the project full circle, a small pedestrian version of the bridge, named The Golden Horn Bridge, was inaugurated in June 2016 in Clos Lucé, France. The bridge was erected to continue and celebrate the legacy and genius of Leonardo da Vinci masterpieces and works that were realized in France. Clos Lucé was Leonardo's residence for his final years before he died in 1519.

Led by Clos Lucé officials with the advisement of Vebjørn, they brought together 30 professionals working for 3,500 hours to build the bridge. It was designed by Armedieval CCB Compagnons du Devoir, artisan craftsmen and women who specialize in ancient buildings.

=== Arrival in New York ===
In order to explore the international art scene and to refine his technical skills Vebjørn left Norway for New York in 2000 and studied at the Art Students League of New York. Enjoying and finding freedom in the New York art scene, he rented a studio in Tribeca, in lower Manhattan where he rededicated himself to painting.

=== Becoming a man ===
In 2008, Vebjørn began work on a series of paintings that examined modern Western masculine ideals, those that “only address ego, greed, and ambition. It is an absence of visions beyond themselves.” he said.

Inspired by the work of American poet Robert Bly, he looked deeply into the lost initiation rituals that helped channel budding masculinity into adulthood, and our youth centered culture, what Bly called the “Sibling Society”. Becoming A Man debuted in May 2008 at Galleri Sand.

=== Scenes from the Second World War and international breakthrough ===
In 2011, Vebjørn began painting his series Scenes from the Second World War, a collection of paintings focused on WWII. In Vebjørn's introduction to the project he points out that while there are many movies and books made of the war, there are little to no paintings or artwork. Inspired to examine the human side of the conflict, Vebjørn aimed to ask these questions with Scenes: “How could civilization collapse so completely? And: what does it mean to be a human being?”

Rather than depict bloody scenes and horrors, Vebjørn opted for singular moments in the war, such as A Scene from Wannsee, the secret Nazi conference in which the “Final Solution to the Jewish question” was decided January 1942, to the Nuremberg Trials to the myth of Josef Schulz, the German soldier who was supposedly shot by his comrades when he refused to execute prisoners in Yugoslavia. While the Holocaust was not the main focus of the paintings, Vebjørn's acute paintbrush brought the horror to life in both the composite scenes and individuals. Reflecting on the core message of Scenes, Vebjørn said:

“World War II shows that we were both angels and demons. I have called this series the individual's choice because the war puts us on trial morally and emotionally and demonstrated that we humans tolerate more than medical science thought... The exhibition is not about the past, but about existential choices that are still relevant.”

Scenes from the Second World War opened in New York on November 10, 2011 to critical acclaim. Part Two opened on May 3, 2012 with several new large canvases being added. The exhibition received both praise from several art critics and high-profile sales, including 3 to American art collector Raymond J. Learsy and his wife Melva Bucksbaum for over a quarter of a million dollars or 2.1 million Norwegian Krone and 1 to an anonymous American newspaper publisher for upwards of 1 million kroner.

The 22 painting series was not without controversy, however. Noted New York critic Donald Kuspit, impressed with the exhibition, advised Vebjørn to bring the exhibition to Germany. But after contacting German curators, Kuspit was informed that none of the galleries could showcase Vebjørn's work. According to Vebjørn, given the subject matter and core themes of Scenes, it would be “too painful” for the Germans to show.

While Scenes from the Second World War was already well received in the United States, bringing the exhibition to Norway was a personal victory for Vebjørn. Scenes opened March 2015 in Oslo, his largest exhibition in Norway in 8 years. A highlight of the successful exhibition came from Stig Andersen, a famous art critic who had been highly critical of Vebjørn in years past. Of Scenes Andersen said,

“I think his second World War series is strong and he manages to create credible moods... This has clearly been the right way for him to go. Several of the paintings have a gripping content and are painstakingly conveyed.”

=== Guernica: A Turning Point ===
After Scenes, Vebjørn, still thoroughly captivated with the human stories and grand scale horror of World War II, began painting his next exhibition, Guernica: A Turning Point in early 2014.

"Sister Anna", Guernica: A Turning Point (2017)

The series focused on the Germans’ brutal attack on the Spanish city of Guernica during the Spanish Civil War in April 1937 that first introduced the concept of “Carpet Bombing”. While cities in Spain had been bombed by the Germans earlier in the war, Guernica was unique because it was both a military experiment conducted against a defenseless civilian population, and it left the city totally destroyed. Fewer than one percent of the buildings were left unscathed and while the official death toll was 1,654, many more were left forever buried under the ruins.

The attack was made infamous by artist Pablo Picasso after the war in his seminal painting “Guernica”. To Vebjørn, however, he found that Picasso's work had grown to overshadow the very event itself:

“- Picasso's painting really stands in the way of Guernica's turning point. It has become more famous than the city itself and what happened. It is iconic as a picture of war and terror, but with all due respect to Picasso, Guernica is so much more than what one sees in his great, famous painting,”

With Guernica, Vebjørn vowed to bring the history of the attack to the forefront with an entirely human perspective. After reading as much source material as he could, speaking with and meeting several historians of the attack, including Luis Iriondo who witnessed it in person at age 14, Vebjørn created nearly 70 unique paintings for the exhibit.

80 years after the original attack and 3 years after beginning the project, Vebjørn exhibited Guernica: A Turning Point in Oslo on April 26, 2017. It was Vebjørn's largest exhibition to date.

Vebjørn's next project is to paint World War II with his homeland of Norway as the backdrop with estimated completion to be in 2020. The year 2020 commemorates the 80th anniversary of the invasion of Norway by the Nazis in 1940 as well as the 75th anniversary of the declaration of peace.

=== Portraiture ===
Vebjørn has been requested and commissioned to paint many private and public portraits of famous figures in Norway. Some of his portraits include:

- Traute Lafrenze, a member of the resistance group "The White Rose"
- Helge Ingstad, Norwegian Explorer and archaeologist
- Lars Roar Langslet, Norwegian Minister of Education and Church Affairs
- Ole Petter Ottersen, the Head of the University of Oslo
- Asbjørn Aarnes, Norwegian Professor and literary historian

=== Rose Castle 2020 ===
On April 9, 2019, Sand, together with his brother Eimund, announced their joint project “Roseslottet 2020” (translated to “Rose Castle 2020”) an art installation to commemorate the 80th anniversary of the German occupation of Norway and the 75th anniversary of Norway's liberation during World War II. The art park will be built above the city of Oslo, surrounded by trees, and a few hundred meters from Frognerseteren. It is the same area that Sand erected the Troll Castle in 1997.

Sand named the exhibition in honor of the WWII German resistance group The White Rose.

Sand interviewed and painted 30 witnesses of the war in Norway to lend even more accuracy and inspiration to the Rose Castle. The late Kjell Grandhagen, former head of the Norwegian Intelligence Service and the project's mentor said: “It’s a wonderful, dignified, modern art installation, which over the course of 13 months will delight the people of Norway, young and old - and will remind us of a chapter in history we hope to never experience again. But first and foremost, the Rose Castle will remind us of the values our society, the vulnerability of our democracy and that we must protect it and never take it for granted.”

The art park is 75 meters in diameter, and is encapsulated by a wall of 90 monumental paintings, largely featuring scenes from WWII painted by Sand himself. Through the entrance lies a 300-meter-long (980 ft) road, in the shape of a spiral galaxy. Walking the path illustrates the cultural journey from antiquity into the present and ends with a vision of the future. Geometric installations visualize the founding principles of democracy, law and humanism. Five golden sails symbolize the resistance under occupation, with the last installation being a 30-meter-tall (98 ft) birch tree that recalls King Haakon VII’s resistance. In the center lies “The unborn star”, a symbol of our responsibility for future generations.

Due to the 2020 COVID-19 health crisis, The Rose Castle's formal opening has been pushed from its original date on April 9, 2020 to May 1, 2020, according to its website. It will be open until May 8, 2021.

== Controversy and activism ==
=== While at university ===
In 1991 while studying at the Norwegian National Academy, Vebjørn drew a national stir when he criticised his art professors for being unable to draw a hand and pushing a purely “modernist” curriculum and agenda.

=== Public art in Norway ===
When a new cultural minister was set to takeover in Norway in 2013, Vebjørn indicated that he hoped for a “fresh and lively debate’ on how the public art funds should be used and even hinted at a total clean up. A longstanding critic of the Norwegian cultural authority, Vebjørn said of the art scene:

"Since the late 60's and the beginning of the 70's, the art politics has been dominated by the modernist and ‘lefties’. They have had the art political power in Norway so to speak. That means they controlled the «official/public art money- and art life» and that means the distribution of public money - the art. I’m thinking of stipendiums, official decorations, commissions etc."

=== Greater Da Vinci Project and Fighting Climate Change ===
Ice Bridge in Queen Maud Land, Antarctica, 2005

Building off the original Da Vinci bridge in Norway, Vebjørn used Leonardo's philosophy of encompassing all fields of research to use the project to discuss global warming. First he used ice to reinterpret and construct a new bridge during his expedition to Queen Maud Land in Antarctica. After that, in December 2007, Vebjørn erected a temporary ice bridge to dramatize the melting glaciers of Antarctica due to climate change outside of the United Nations Plaza in New York. During the unveiling at the U.N. Headquarters, Vebjørn said of the bridge in Antarctica,

“Our future lays underneath that ice glacier. So to erect it on that glacier, and that part of Antarctica, (it) must never melt. The one outside the United Nations is intended to melt to show that Antarctica is melting.”

The bridge was unveiled earlier that year two days after nearly 200 nations agreed at the U.N.-led talks in Bali to launch negotiations on a new pact to fight global warming.

In 2009, Vebjørn built another ice bridge in Ilulissat, Greenland (where most icebergs are borne into the sea). Later that year in Copenhagen, as part of the United Nations Climate Change Conference, also known as COP15, Vebjørn constructed yet another ice bridge in front of the Danish Parliament to raise global awareness of climate change.

== Personal life ==
Vebjørn grew up in Hvaler, Norway with his 4 siblings. He has a twin brother, Aune Sand, who is a public figure in Norway. Though Vebjørn keeps out of the public eye, he has appeared numerous times on national television. Vebjørn and Aune have both been contestants on Skal Vi Danse, the Norwegian adaptation of the British dancing show Strictly Come Dancing with Vebjørn appearing in Season 8. Vebjørn has also participated in a cooking program, 4 Star Dinner and most recently in 2018 on NRK’s Kunsten å leve.

== List of public projects ==
- Leonardo Bridge Project, Château du clos lucé, 2016
- The Ice Bridge, Leonardo Bridge Project, COP15, Copenhagen, 2009
- The Ice Bridge, Leonardo Bridge Project, Greenland, 2009
- The Ice Bridge, Leonardo Bridge Project, The United Nations, NYC 2007-2008
- The Ice Bridge, Leonardo Bridge Project, Antarctica, 2006
- The Norwegian Leonardo Project, Oslo, Norway, 2001
- The Kepler Star (“Norwegian Peace Star”) Oslo, Norway, 2000
- The Troll Castle (“Trollslottet”) Oslo, Norway 1997-98
- The Rose Castle 2020 (“Roseslottet 2020") Oslo, Norway Under Construction (Estimated completion May 1, 2020)

== List of expeditions ==
- Greenland, 2009
- Queen Maud Land, Antarctica, 2006
- Queen Maud Land, Antarctica, 1996
- South Rondane, Antarctica, 1997
