= Ås, Akershus =

Ås Municipality Ås kommune
- Municipality
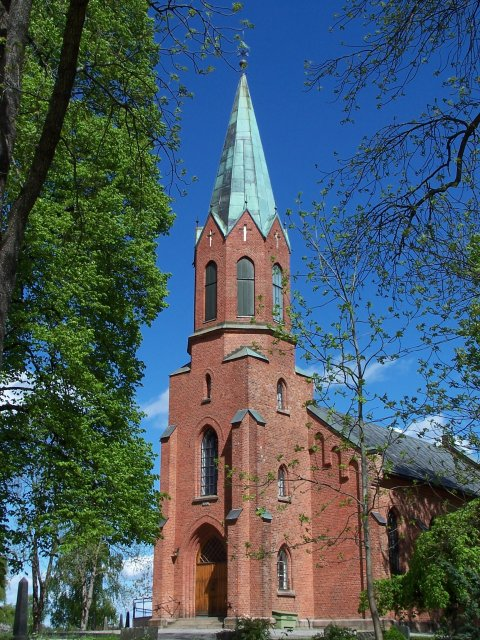

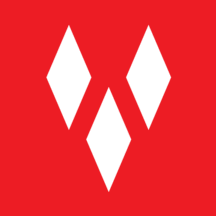
- Flag Coat of arms

- Akershus within Norway

- Ås within Akershus
- Coordinates: 59°39′37″N 10°47′1″E
- Country: Norway
- County: Akershus
- District: Follo
- Administrative centre: Ås

Area
  - Total: 103 km^{2} (40 sq mi)
  - Land: 101.3 km^{2} (39.1 sq mi)
  - Rank: #383 in Norway

Population (2020)
  - Total: 20,652
  - Density: 156.6/km^{2} (406/sq mi)
  - Change (10 years): ▲ +17.5%

Official language
  - Norwegian form: Neutral
- Time zone: UTC+01:00 (CET)
  - Summer (DST): UTC+02:00 (CEST)
- ISO 3166 code: NO-3218
- Website: Official website

Ås is a municipality in Akershus county, Norway. It is part of the Follo traditional region. The administrative centre of the municipality is the village of Ås. The parish of Aas was established as a municipality on 1 January 1838 (see formannskapsdistrikt).

Ås is one of the fastest-growing municipalities in Akershus, with a population of 20,652 in 2020, and an increase of 539 in 2008. Ås is the largest agricultural municipality of Akershus, and home to the Norwegian University of Life Sciences and the amusement park Tusenfryd.

== General information ==
=== Etymology ===
The parish was named after the old Ås (Norse Áss) farm, since the first church was built there. The name is identical with the word áss meaning "hill", "ridge" or "esker" (height in moraine landscape). Prior to 1921, the name was spelled Aas.

=== Coat-of-arms ===
The coat-of-arms is from modern times. They were granted on 23 July 1982. The three silver diamonds are a symbol for the many archaeological findings in the area. The diamond (rhombus) shape was taken as it resembled many of the axes found in the area (Nøstvet ax). The silver colour resembles the flint, which the tools were made of. The number of three diamonds was chosen to represent the three parishes in the municipality: Ås, Kroer and Nordby.

== Economy ==
The most important source of income is agriculture. Ås is the largest agricultural municipality of Akershus: providing the region with grain, vegetables, and dairy products. Of the 101 km^{2} (39 mi^{2}) of land in the municipality, about 39 km^{2} (15 mi^{2}) are farmed and about 46 km^{2} (18 mi^{2}) are forested.

== The park at NMBU ==
The park at Norwegian University of Life Sciences is one of the largest and most completed neoclassical parka facilities in Norway. The park today appears as a result of the docent Olav L. Moen's plans from around 1924. The park is located at highway 152 towards Drøbak, about 1 kilometre west of Ås town centre. The entire park area is about 600 acres and is used for recreation and teaching. The park contains 800 different types of shrubs and trees, a teaching field with just over 200 perennial species and a rosarium founded in 1965. The plant species are collected family and family. Most of the plants are labelled so that it is possible for plant enthusiasts to orient themselves in the plant collection. The park is an integral part of NMBU.

== Leonardo da Vinci Bridge ==
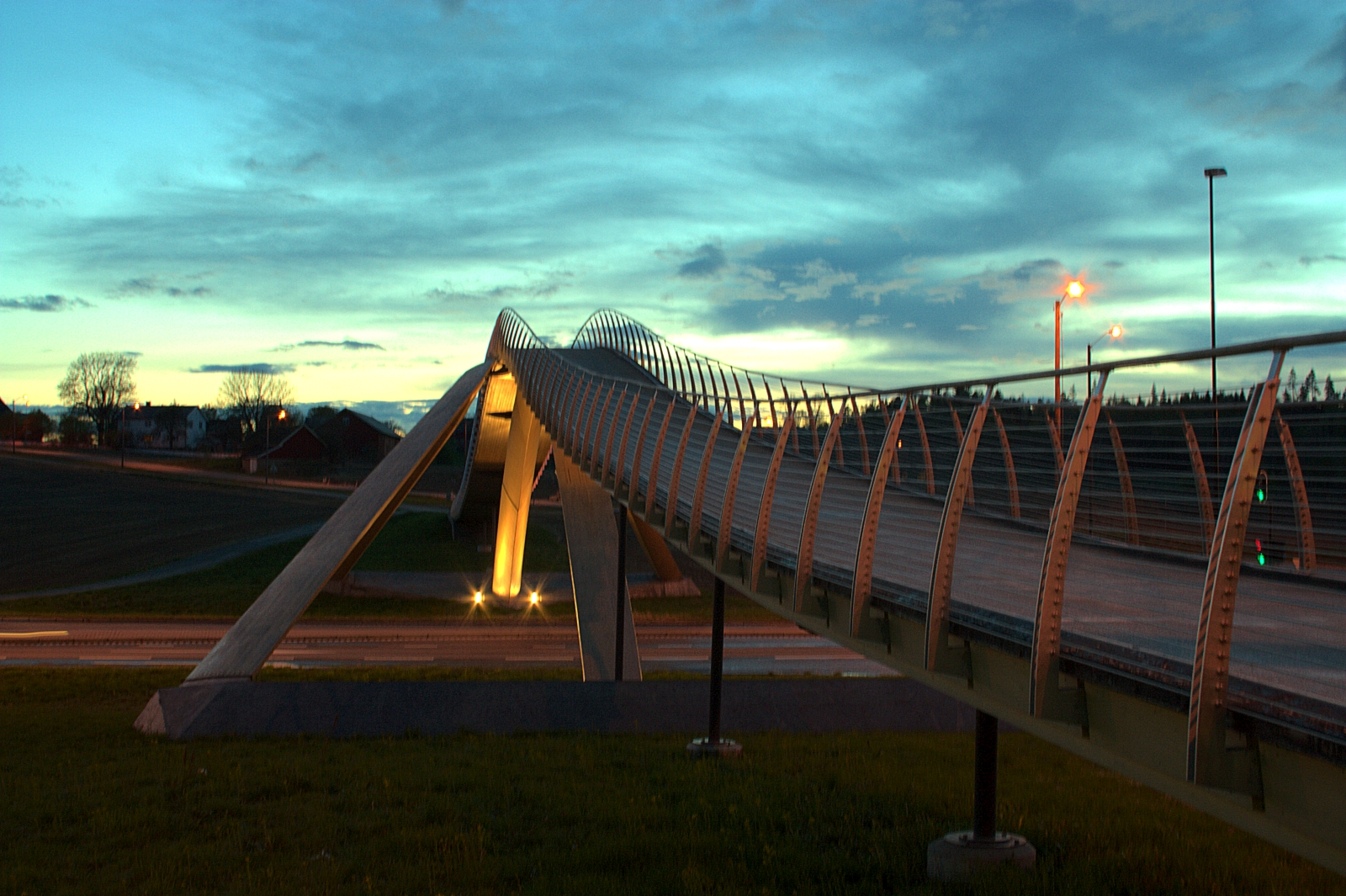
Leonardo da Vinci Bridge in Ås (Åsmund Ødegård)

In Nygårdskrysset in Ås municipality over The European route E18 lies the 108-metre-long Leonardo Da Vinci project which is a project by the painter and artist Vebjørn Sandas part of his Da Vinci project. Vebjørn Sand saw the drawings of the bridge for the first time in 1985. Later in 1995 he saw a model of the bridge on display in Stockholm, and got the idea to build the bridge in full size.

The bridge was opened in October 2001. The bridge has received solid media coverage in Norway and in the rest of the world. In the United States, the bridge has been featured in CNN, Washington Post, The New York Times and Time Magazine. Leonardo da Vinci presented a miniature model of the bridge in 1502 that was originally designed by the Turkish sultan Bayezid II and intended to cross the Golden Horn at the Bosporos-Strait. The bridge was originally supposed to be 240 metres long.

== Climate ==
Climate data for Ås (1994–2023 normals and extremes)
| Month | Jan | Feb | Mar | Apr | May | Jun | Jul | Aug | Sep | Oct | Nov | Dec | Year |
|---|---|---|---|---|---|---|---|---|---|---|---|---|---|
| Record high °C (°F) | 11.9 (53.4) | 13.1 (55.6) | 21.1 (70.0) | 24.0 (75.2) | 29.5 (85.1) | 30.5 (86.9) | 33.6 (92.5) | 29.8 (85.6) | 26.1 (79.0) | 18.1 (64.6) | 16.1 (61.0) | 12.4 (54.3) | 33.6 (92.5) |
| Mean maximum °C (°F) | 6.4 (43.5) | 7.9 (46.2) | 12.5 (54.5) | 18.1 (64.6) | 23.4 (74.1) | 25.8 (78.4) | 27.3 (81.1) | 25.8 (78.4) | 21.5 (70.7) | 15.4 (59.7) | 10.9 (51.6) | 7.3 (45.1) | 27.3 (81.1) |
| Mean daily maximum °C (°F) | −0.3 (31.5) | 1.2 (34.2) | 5.1 (41.2) | 10.6 (51.1) | 15.7 (60.3) | 19.7 (67.5) | 21.6 (70.9) | 20.5 (68.9) | 16.2 (61.2) | 9.9 (49.8) | 4.5 (40.1) | 0.3 (32.5) | 10.4 (50.8) |
| Daily mean °C (°F) | −2.8 (27.0) | −2.1 (28.2) | 0.6 (33.1) | 5.5 (41.9) | 10.6 (51.1) | 14.8 (58.6) | 16.8 (62.2) | 15.6 (60.1) | 11.8 (53.2) | 6.4 (43.5) | 1.9 (35.4) | −2.4 (27.7) | 6.4 (43.5) |
| Mean daily minimum °C (°F) | −6.0 (21.2) | −5.6 (21.9) | −3.5 (25.7) | 0.7 (33.3) | 5.4 (41.7) | 9.9 (49.8) | 11.9 (53.4) | 11.1 (52.0) | 7.7 (45.9) | 3.1 (37.6) | −0.8 (30.6) | −5.2 (22.6) | 2.4 (36.3) |
| Mean minimum °C (°F) | −16.9 (1.6) | −16.1 (3.0) | −12.0 (10.4) | −5.9 (21.4) | −1.5 (29.3) | 4.2 (39.6) | 6.4 (43.5) | 4.7 (40.5) | 0.3 (32.5) | −4.6 (23.7) | −8.9 (16.0) | −16.0 (3.2) | −16.9 (1.6) |
| Record low °C (°F) | −25.5 (−13.9) | −23.4 (−10.1) | −20.7 (−5.3) | −10.1 (13.8) | −4.9 (23.2) | 1.4 (34.5) | 4.4 (39.9) | 0.2 (32.4) | −3.4 (25.9) | −10.4 (13.3) | −15.0 (5.0) | −26.4 (−15.5) | −26.4 (−15.5) |
| Average precipitation mm (inches) | 66.9 (2.63) | 51.9 (2.04) | 40.9 (1.61) | 50.0 (1.97) | 63.9 (2.52) | 78.8 (3.10) | 81.0 (3.19) | 88.6 (3.49) | 95.1 (3.74) | 104.7 (4.12) | 91.1 (3.59) | 72.4 (2.85) | 885.3 (34.85) |
Source: Seklima

== Transportation ==
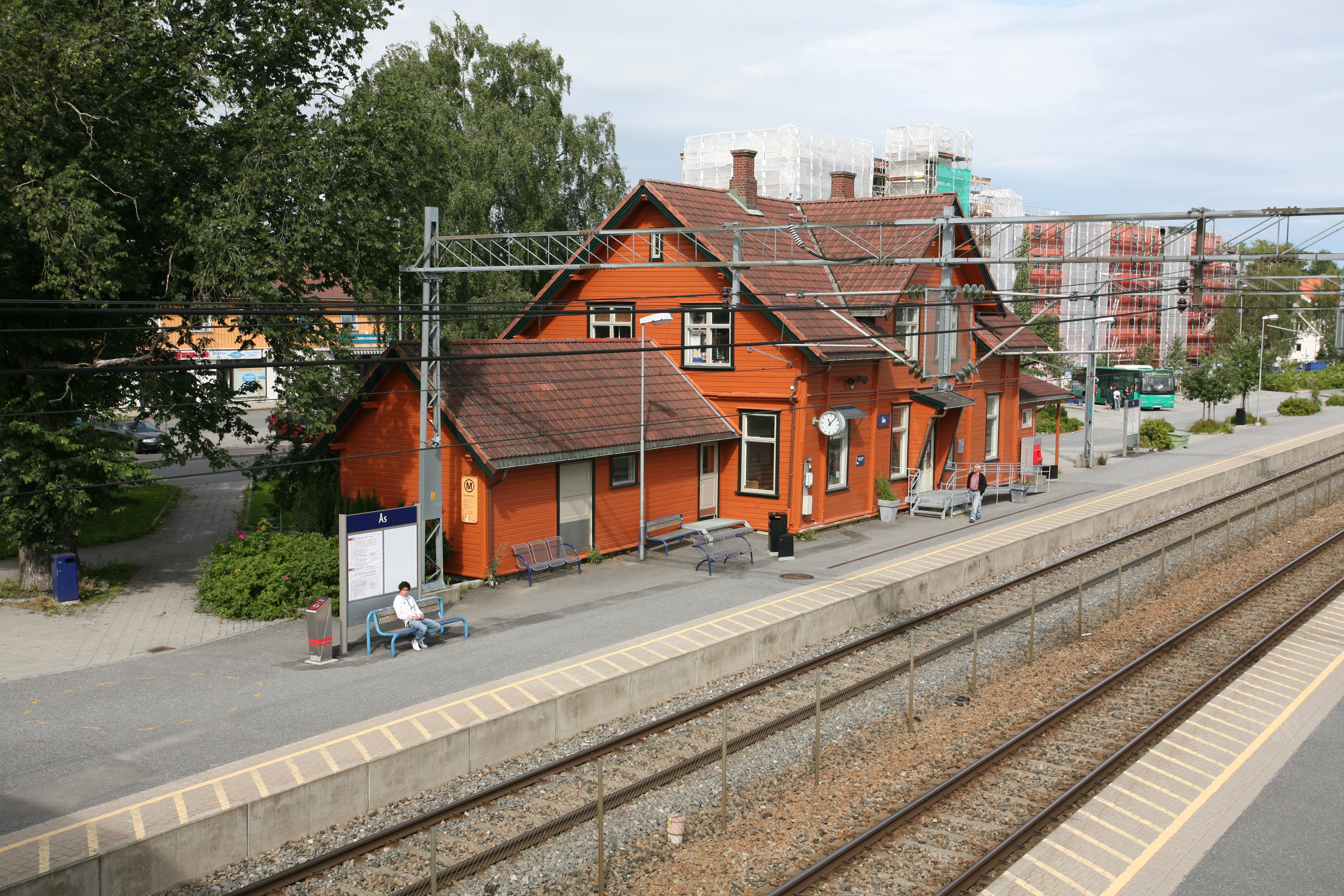
Ås Station opened on 2 January 1879 (pictured in August 2007)

Ås Station is a train station served by the line R21 of the Oslo Commuter Rail, operated by the Vy. Two of Norway's largest highways, European route E6 and European route E18, run through the municipality, and many of the inhabitants commute to Oslo.

A 240-metre-long (787 ft) bridge, which is a smaller-scale recreation of a bridge that Leonardo da Vinci proposed in 1502 for the crossing of the Golden Horn, is located in the municipality. It was created by Norwegian painter and artist Vebjørn Sand as part of his Da Vinci project. The bridge serves as a pedestrian crossing over European route E18.

== Population ==
As of 1 January 2020, Ås municipality covers 101.3 km^{2} (39 mi^{2}) and has 20,652 inhabitants. In 2007, the Ås urban area had a population of 8,095. The municipality also contains one additional urban area, Togrenda, with a population of 2,783. Also, 1,566 inhabitants live in the Ski urban area.

Minorities in Ås in 2017
| Ancestry | Number |
|---|---|
| Poland | 521 |
| Sweden | 244 |
| Lithuania | 214 |
| Ethiopia | 173 |
| Germany | 161 |
| Pakistan | 136 |
| Iran | 134 |
| Denmark | 132 |
| Iraq | 122 |
| Kosovo | 120 |

== Notable residents ==
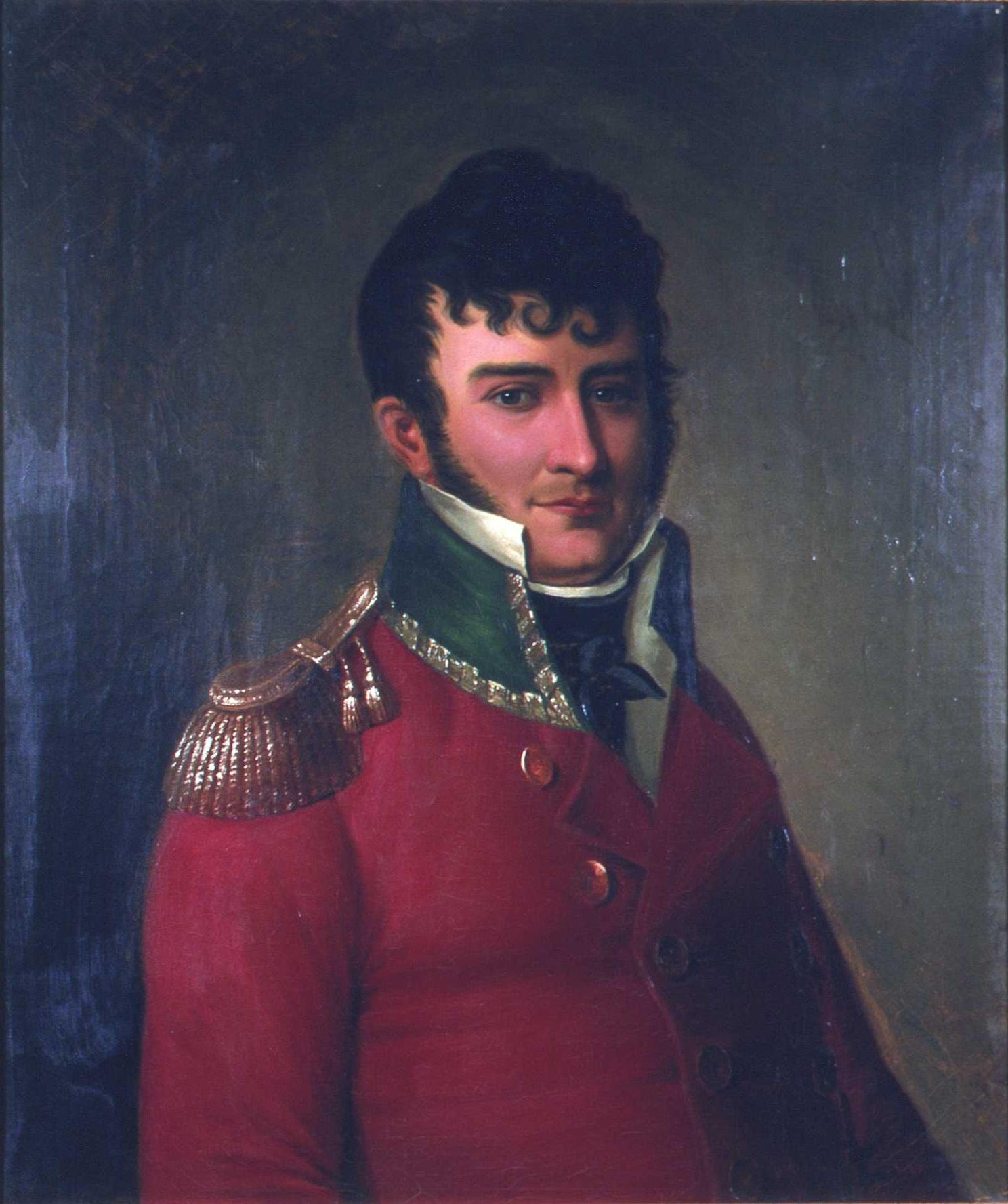
Christian Magnus Falsen

- Christian Magnus Falsen (1782–1830), Norwegian constitutional father, jurist and historian; lived in Ås from 1808
- Ragnar Skancke (1890 in Ås – executed 1948), electrical engineer, appointed Govt. Minister in Vidkun Quisling's Nasjonal Samling government; the last person to be executed in Norway
- Fanny Elsta (1899–1978), opera singer; raised in Ås
- Birger Hønningstad (1904 in Ås – 1976), an engineer and aircraft designer
- Karen Holtsmark (1907 in Ås – 1998), a Norwegian painter
- Odd Tandberg (1924 in Ås – 2017), a Norwegian painter and printmaker
- Øystein Wiik (born 1956), actor and singer
- Solveig Kringlebotn (born 1963), a Norwegian operatic soprano
- Edvard Skagestad (born 1988 in Ås), a Norwegian footballer with 230 club caps
- K-391 (Kenneth Osberg Nilsen) (born 1994), a music producer

== Sister cities ==
The following cities are twinned with Ås:

- – Ljungby kommun, Kronobergs län, Sweden
- – Paimio, Länsi-Suomi, Finland
- – Holbæk Kommune, Region Sjælland, Denmark
