= Vekoma =

Dutch amusement ride manufacturer

Vekoma Rides Manufacturing
- Type: Subsidiary
- Founded: 1926
- Founder: Hendrik op het Veld
- Headquarters: Vlodrop (Roerdalen), The Netherlands
- Area served: Worldwide
- Key people: Anne-Mart Agerbeek (CEO)
- Products: Amusement rides
- Parent: Sansei Technologies
- Website: www.vekoma.com

Vekoma Rides Manufacturing is a Dutch amusement ride manufacturer. Vekoma is a syllabic abbreviation of Veld Koning Machinefabriek (Veld Koning Machine Factory), which was established in 1926 by Hendrik op het Veld.

== History ==
The company originally manufactured farm equipment and later made steel constructions for the coal mining industry in the 1950s. As business shifted from farming equipment to steel construction, Veld Koning Machinefabriek was shortened to Vekoma. After the closure of Dutch mines in 1965, Vekoma manufactured steel pipes for the petrochemical industry. In the 1970s Vekoma was contracted by U.S. amusement ride manufacturer Arrow Development to build the steel structure for its roller coasters in Europe. As demand increased, Arrow instructed Vekoma in track building techniques and eventually licensed its coaster-building technology. In 1979 Vekoma entered the market on its own, opening three coasters in Europe under the name Vekoma Rides Manufacturing BV.

On 23 August 2001, Vekoma filed for bankruptcy.

In 2006, Vekoma formed an alliance with U.S.-based manufacturer Chance Morgan. Chance Rides represented Vekoma in North America and Chance Morgan manufactured the steel track for select projects. During this agreement, Chance built four Vekoma-designed family coasters.

In 2008, Vekoma Rides Manufacturing acquired the Wheels of Excellence range of Ferris wheels from Ronald Bussink. Under the agreement, Bussink continued to supply wheels 100 meters and taller. Smaller wheels in the 40- to 80-meter range transitioned to a new manufacturing division of Vekoma, Dutch Wheels BV.

On 17 October 2012, Chance Rides and Vekoma discontinued the agreement to produce rides together for the North American market. However, shortly after terminating that agreement, Chance Rides was given an exclusive license from Dutch Wheels BV to manufacture and sell R60 wheels in the North American market under a new affiliate, Chance American Wheels.

On 30 March 2018, Vekoma was acquired by Sansei Technologies, the parent company of American ride manufacturer S&S Sansei. The conditions stipulated that Vekoma's business model remain unchanged after the acquisition. Vekoma continues to manufacture and market rides as a separate entity. Dutch Wheels BV was not a component of the sale, so Dutch Wheels BV was spun off into its own company at the same time.

== Roller coasters ==
As of October 2026, there have been over 450 roller coasters around the world built by Vekoma. Some of these are either under construction or have been removed.

=== Models ===
Model	First produced	Description
Bermuda Blitz	2017	A sit down multi-inversion roller coaster with new generation trains and restraints. An off the shelf layout is available replicating Lech Coaster, which is the only installation of the model that currently exists. Lech Coaster is in Legendia in Poland.
Big Air	2010	Formerly known as a hammerhead stall due to the spinning function it previously possessed. There is only one installation of this roller coaster, located at E-DA Theme Park in Taiwan.
Boomerang	1984	a type of Shuttle roller coaster with three inversions, height of 117 feet (35.66 m), and speed of 47 mph (76 km/h).
Corkscrew with Bayerncurve (discontinued)	1979	An adaptation of the standard Arrow Development corkscrew roller coaster.
Dive Pretzel Coaster	2014	A roller coaster with a 90 degree climb and several pretzel loop elements.
Double Loop-Corkscrew	1981	A modified version of the MK-1200, it consisted of four inversions (two vertical loopings and two corkscrews and a standard track.
Flying Dutchman	2000	First large-scale flying roller coaster built. The last one, Batwing, closed in 2025.
Giant Inverted Boomerang	2001	Like Invertigo but with vertical lift hills and slightly different layout.
Hurricane	1989	Has a vertical loop and a double corkscrew. There were only 2 installations ever.
Invertigo	1996	An inverted model of the Boomerang.
Motorbike roller coaster	2004	Vekoma-launched roller coaster with trains like motorbikes.
LSM Launch coaster	1999	Roller coaster with three inversions. Launched around 55 mph (89 km/h) using LSM technology. Only three installations of this model exists.
Space Warp Launch coaster	2016	A sit down LSM launch coaster built with new-generation track and trains in a layout with multiple inversions. Only one installation of this model exists.
Splash Party	2013	An inverted slower-paced roller coaster that is designed with several water gun and water bomb placements. Only one installation of this model exists.
Stingray	2009	A compact flying roller coaster designed as the successor to the Flying Dutchman. Only one example has been installed, being Stingray at Giant Wheel Park of Suzhou.
Suspended Family Coaster	2001	Inverted family coaster very similar to the Suspended Looping Coaster
Suspended Looping Coaster	1994	Inverted coaster with several different models.
Suspended Thrill Coaster	2020	The successor to the Suspended Looping Coaster which features a different track style and layout. Debuted with Hals-über-Kopf at Erlebnispark Tripsdrill.
Tornado (loop-corkscrew)	1986	A modified version of the MK-1200. The layout contains a turn to the left out of the station, a lift hill, a drop curved to the right, a loop, a turn to the right, a corkscrew, another turn to the right, the brake run and a final turn to the left. It uses a standard track. Three of these have been installed, of which two are still operating.
Mine train coaster	1992	A roller coaster with a Western, mountain or mine themed style. 785 m (2,575 ft) and MK-900 M models.
Junior coaster	1990	Roller coaster aimed at children. 207 and 335 m (679 and 1,099 ft) models.
Shockwave coaster	2019	A sit down LSM launch coaster built with new-generation track and trains with multiple inversions and features sometimes tunnels. 1095m and 1320m models.
Top Gun Launch coaster	2020	A sit down LSM launch coaster built with new-generation track and trains but with a different layout and multiple inversions.
Wooden roller coaster	2000	Classic wooden coaster produced by Vekoma. There are two examples: the Thundercoaster at TusenFryd, and Loup-Garou at Walibi Belgium. Previously, there was one of these models at Walibi Holland called Robin Hood, however, it became an RMC hybrid coaster called Untamed in 2019.
Thrill glider coaster	2026/7	Combination of a Flying roller coaster and a motorbike coaster

Other Vekoma coaster models include Wild Mouse, Hyper Space Warp, Firestorm, Swinging Turns, Enigma, Illusion, Family Boomerang, Tilt Coaster, Energy Storm and Powered Coasters.

In 2013, Vekoma signed a deal with Idaho-based Rocky Mountain Construction. The agreement allows Vekoma to sell Rocky Mountain Construction's roller coasters outside the North American market.

Vekoma is also the constructor of Guardians of the Galaxy: Cosmic Rewind at EPCOT in Walt Disney World, designing innovative new "omni-coaster" cars with the capability for controlled turns and spins.

== Other attractions ==
=== Ferris wheels ===
The Dutch Wheels product range includes the R40, R50, and R60 models, each available in three different types.

==== Notable installations ====
Ferris wheel name	Location	Opened	Status	Reference
Giant Wheel	Six Flags Darien Lake, Darien, New York, US	1983-2019	Closed	
Giant Wheel	Morey's Piers, Wildwood, New Jersey, US	1985	Operating	
Navy Pier Ferris Wheel	Pier Park, Navy Pier, Chicago, US	1995	Relocated	
Delhi Eye (R50)	Kalindi Kunj Park, Okhla, Delhi, India	2014		
Hong Kong Observation Wheel	Central, Hong Kong	2014	Operating	
Branson Ferris Wheel (former Navy Pier Wheel)	Branson, Missouri	2016	Operating	
Grande roue de Montréal	Montreal, Canada	2017	Operating	

=== Madhouse ===
A madhouse is a flat ride that gives the impression that the rider is upside-down, when in reality the room they are in rotates around them.

== Gallery ==
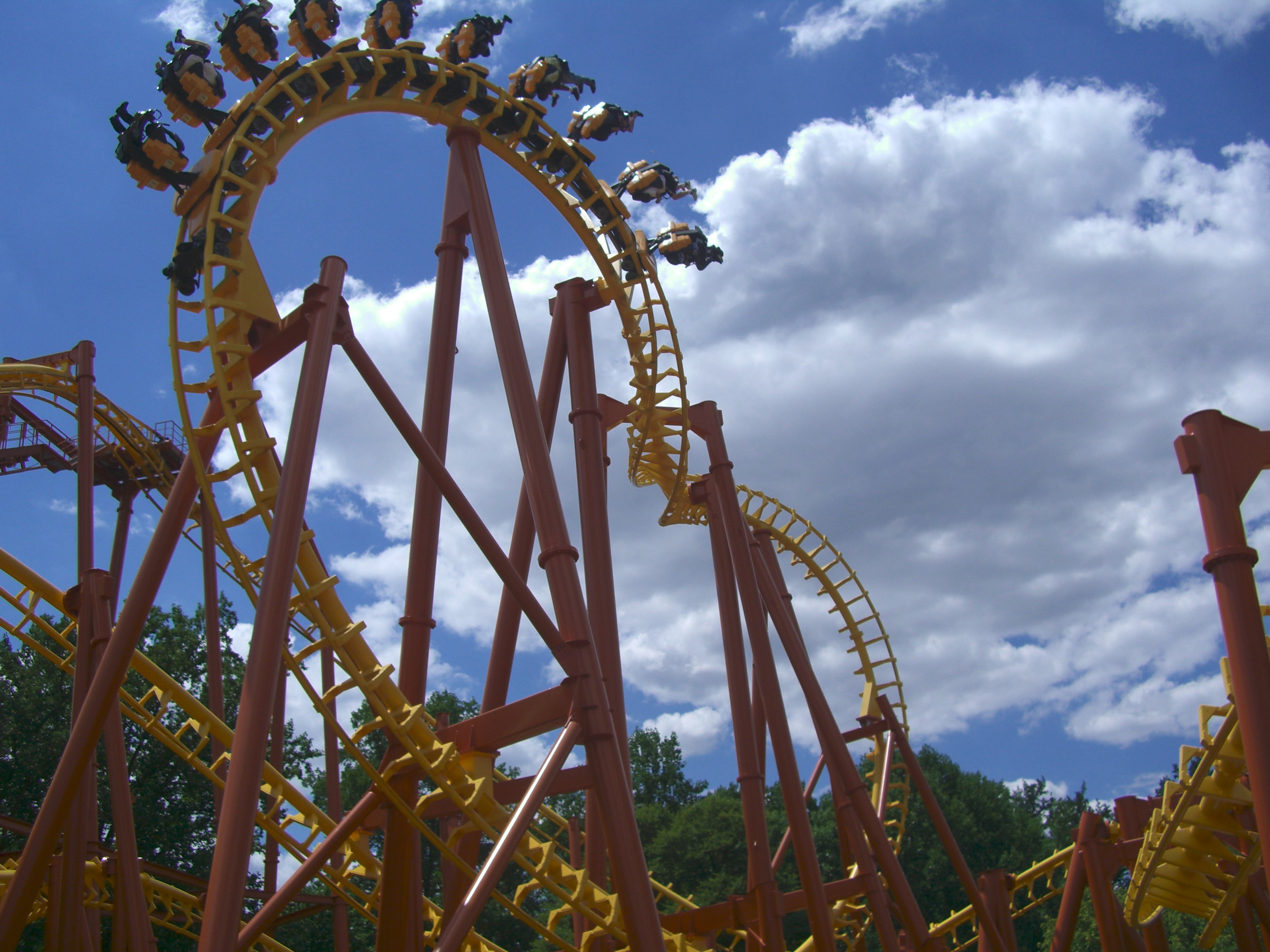
Suspended Looping Coaster, a popular Vekoma design

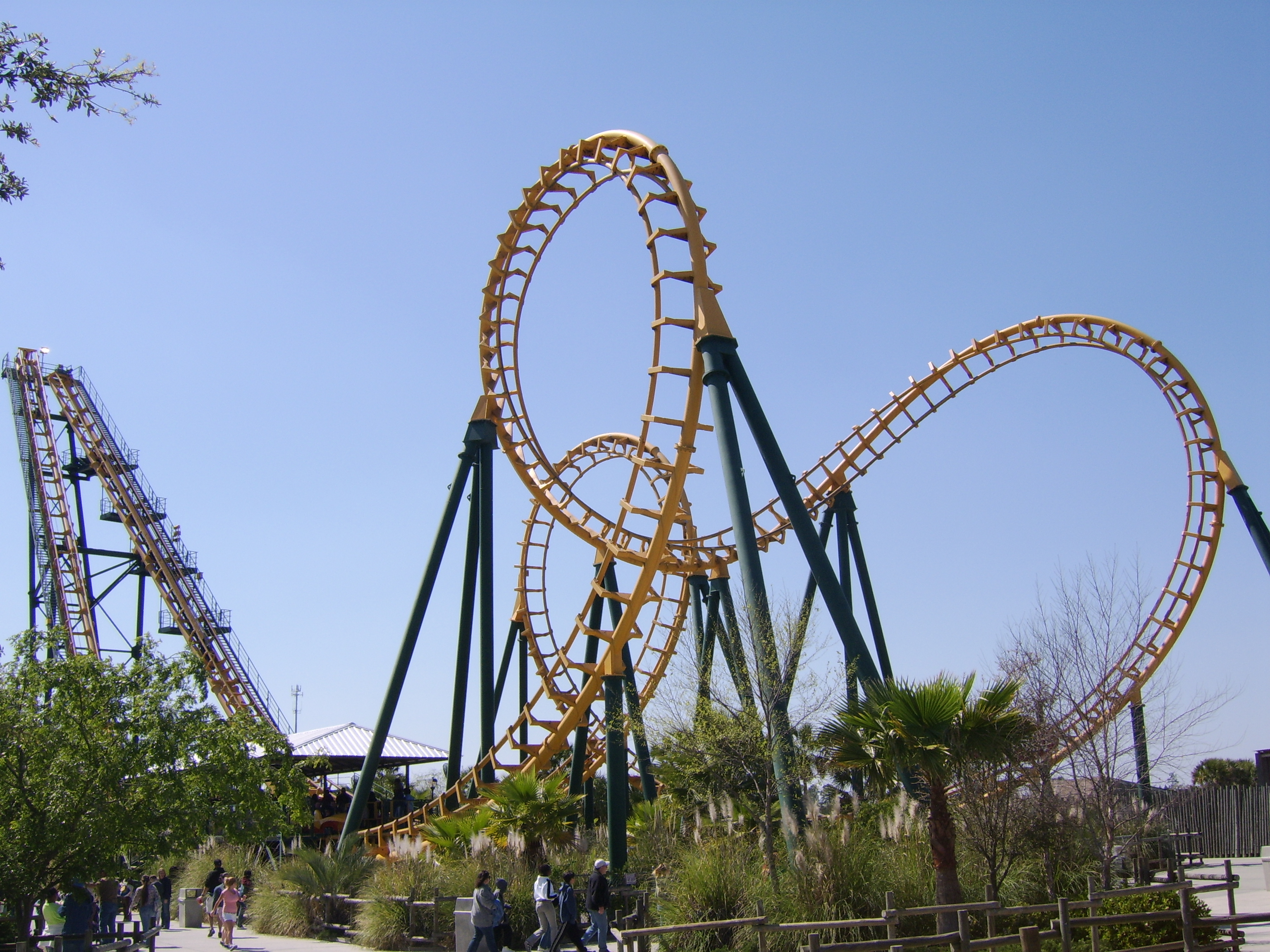
Boomerang, another of Vekoma's most popular ride models

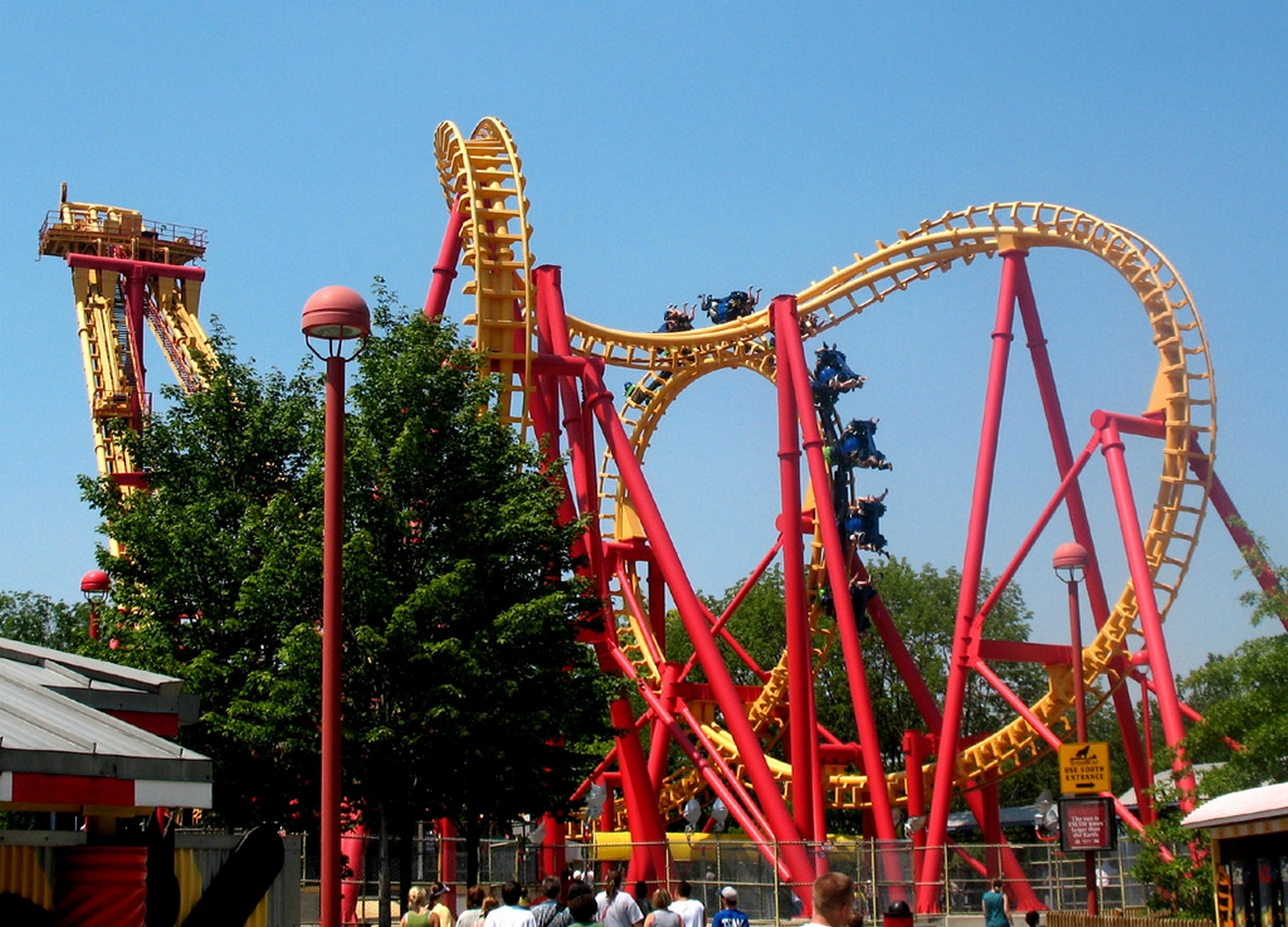
Invertigo, a variation on the Boomerang design

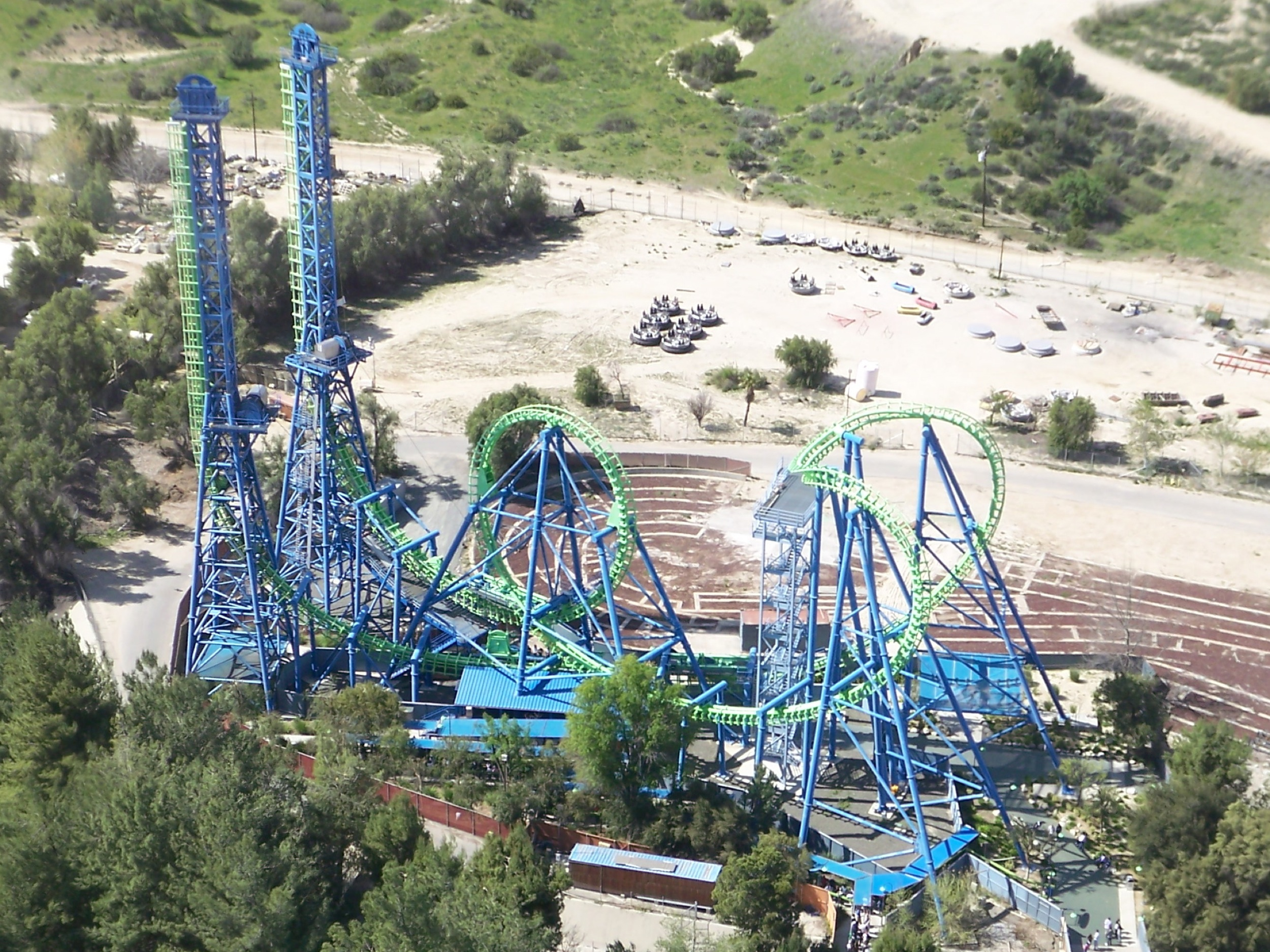
Giant Inverted Boomerang, a more extreme version of Invertigo

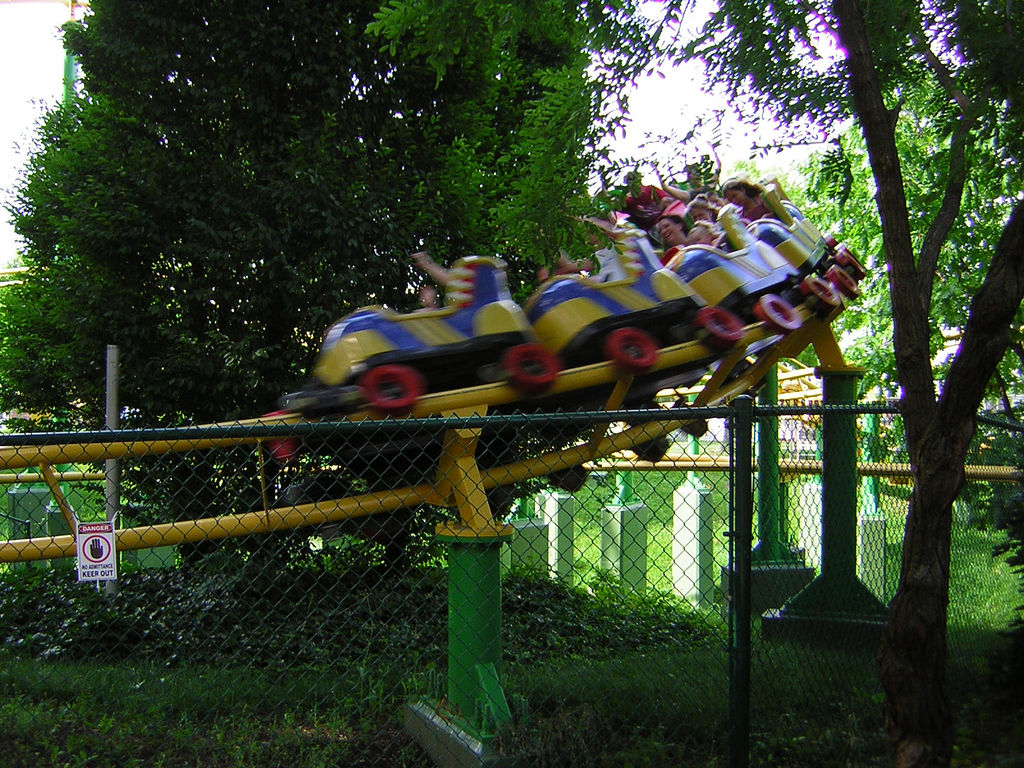
Vekoma Roller Skater, a small family coaster design

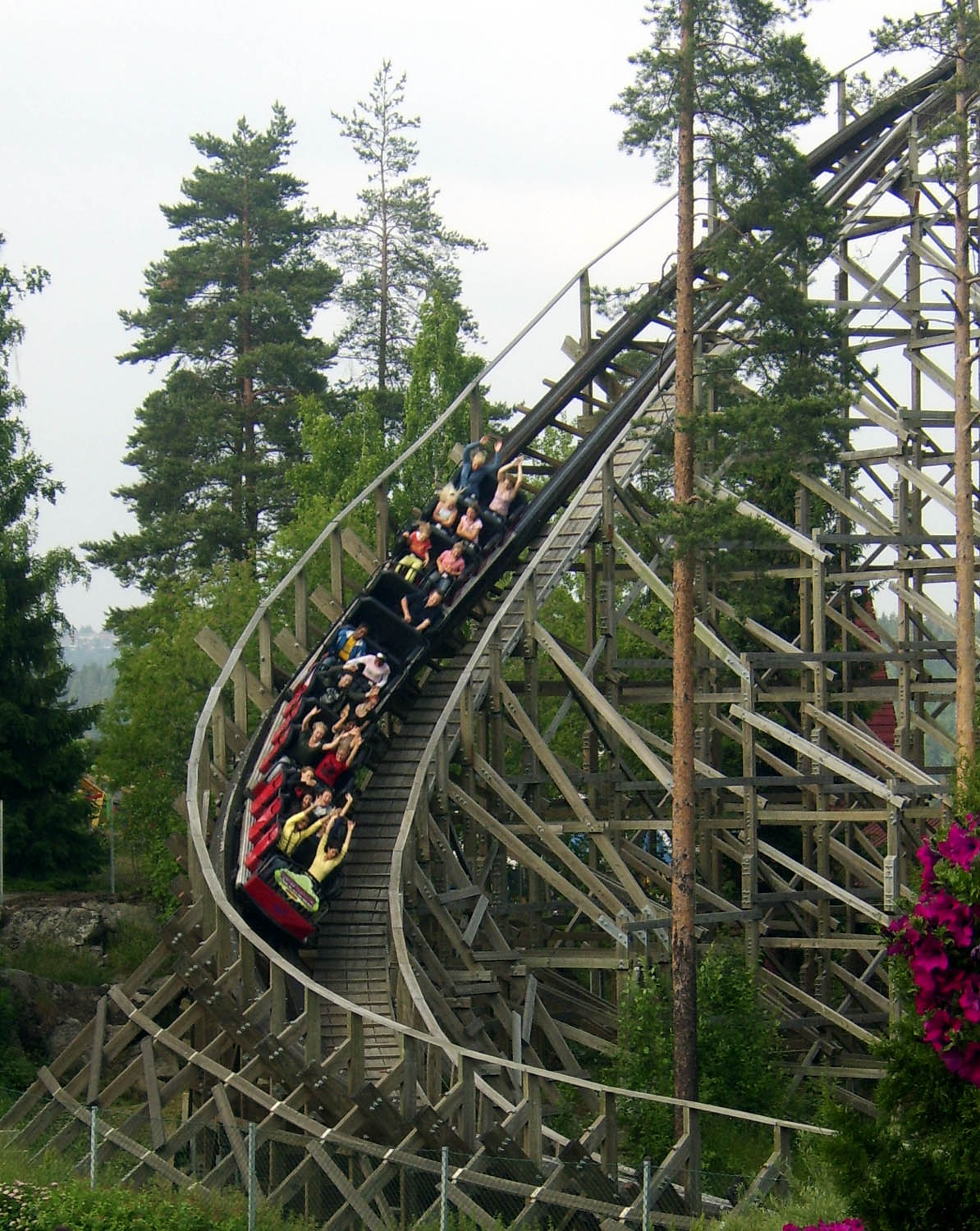
Wooden Coaster, One of Vekoma's wooden coasters (Thundercoaster Tusenfryd)

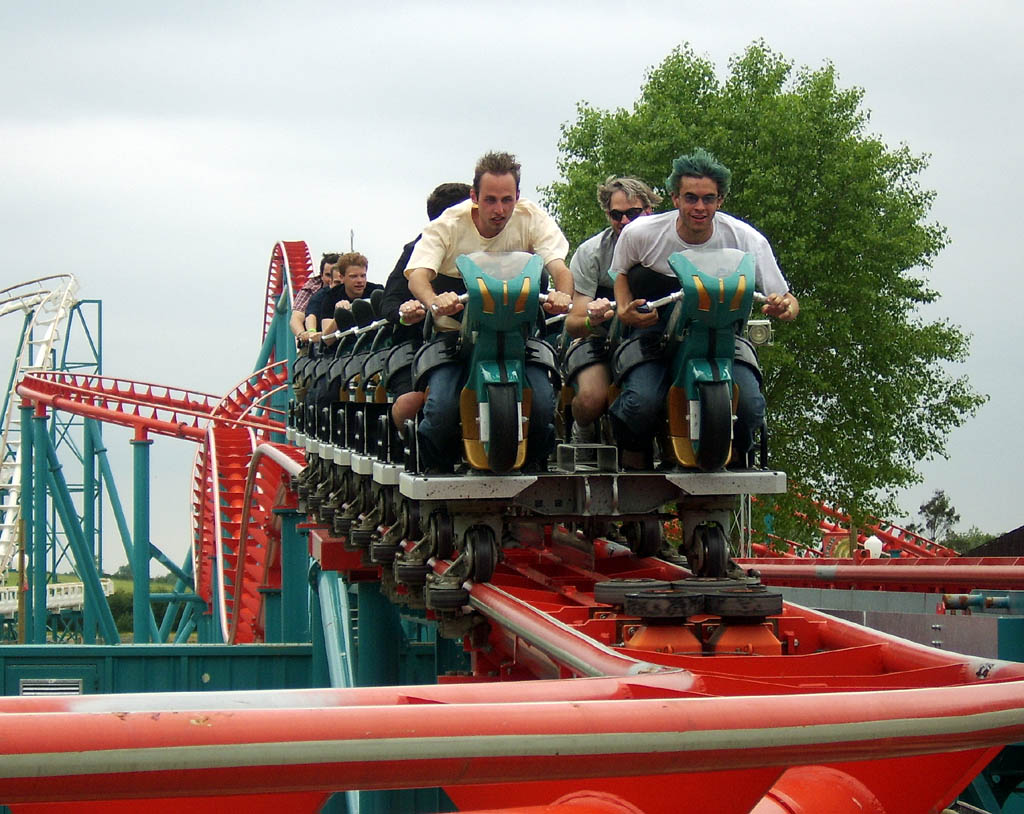
Motorbike roller coaster, a specially designed coaster with seats that are like motorbikes

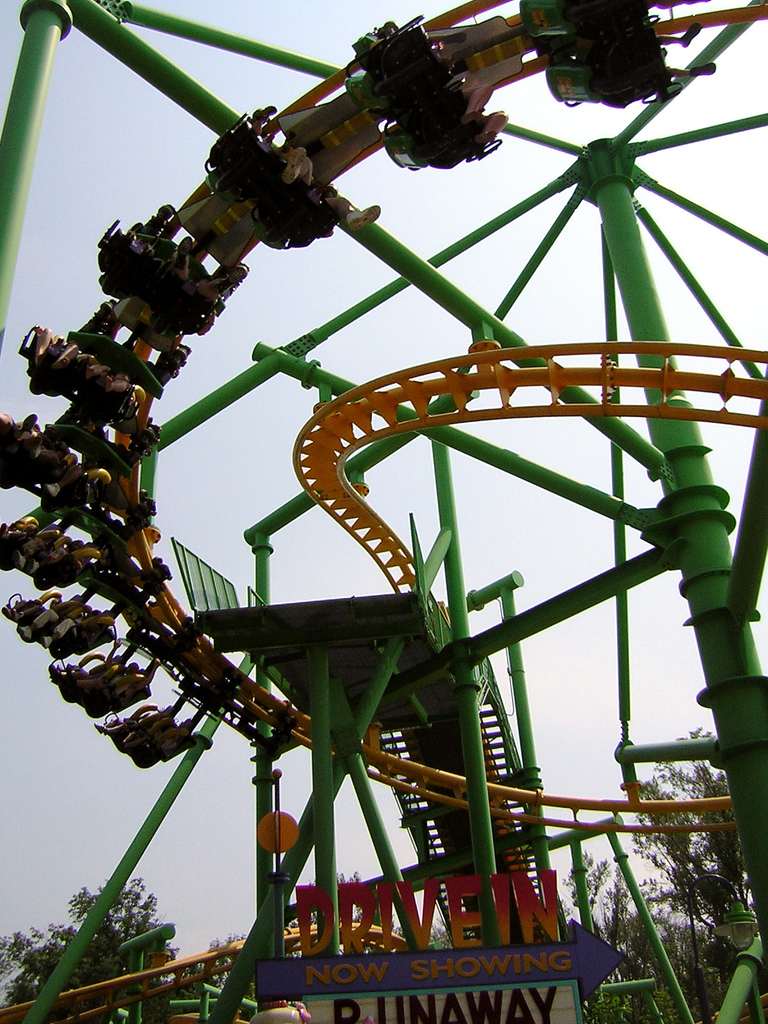
Suspended Family Coaster
