= Togrenda =

- Village
- Location in Akershus
- Coordinates: 59°44′0″N 10°45′0″E
- Country: Norway
- Region: Østlandet
- County: Akershus
- Municipality: Ås
- Time zone: UTC+01:00 (CET)
  - Summer (DST): UTC+02:00 (CEST)

Togrenda is a village in the municipality of Ås, Norway. Its population (2005) is 2,588.
