= Untamed (Walibi Holland) =

Hybrid steel-wood roller coaster

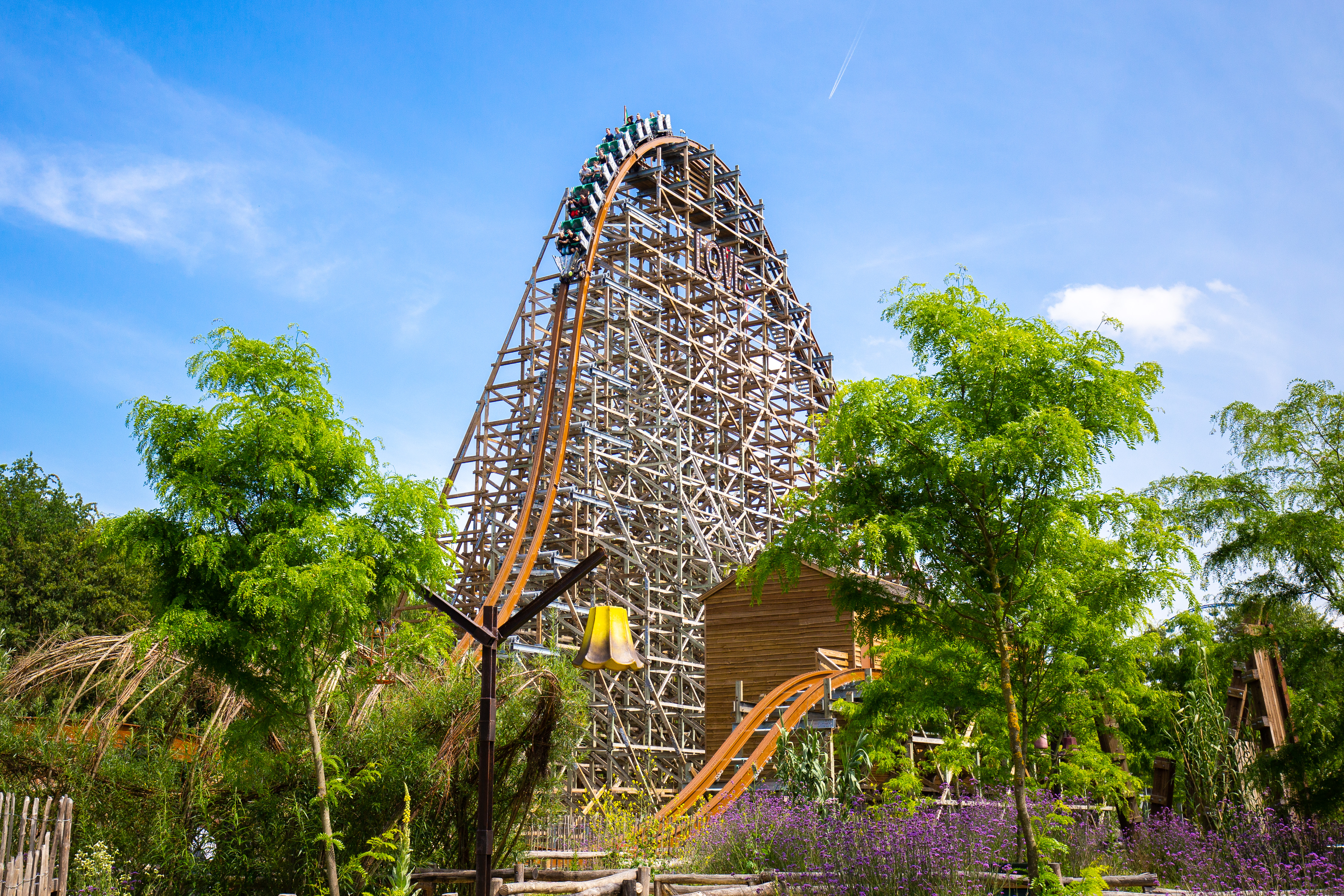

Walibi Holland
- Location: Walibi Holland
- Park section: Wilderness
- Coordinates: 52°26′34″N 5°45′39″E
- Status: Operating
- Opening date: 1 July 2019
- Replaced: Robin Hood

General statistics
- Type: Steel
- Manufacturer: Rocky Mountain Construction
- Designer: Alan Schilke
- Model: I-Box Track
- Lift/launch system: Chain lift hill
- Inversions: 5
- Duration: 1:46
- Max vertical angle: 80°
- Capacity: 900 riders per hour
- G-force: 3.75g
- Height restriction: 120 cm (3 ft 11 in)
- Trains: 2 trains with 6 cars. Riders are arranged 2 across in 2 rows for a total of 24 riders per train.
- Height: 36.5 m (119.8 ft)
- Drop: 35.4 m (116.1 ft)
- Length: 1,085 m (3,559 ft)
- Speed: 92 km/h (57.2 mph)
- Restraints: Seat belt and lap bar
- Fast Lane available
- Single rider line available
- Untamed at RCDB

Untamed is a Rocky Mountain Construction hybrid steel-wood roller coaster at Walibi Holland, a theme park in the Netherlands. Untamed replaced Robin Hood, a wooden roller coaster that closed on 28 October 2018.

== History ==
=== Robin Hood ===
Robin Hood was a coaster designed by Stand Company and was built by Vekoma. The ride opened in 2000 and had a capacity of 815 people per hour, operating two trains carrying 24 people. Robin Hood closed on 28 October 2018, for a makeover from Rocky Mountain Construction.

In 2024, the train was sent to Walibi Belgium to be used as spare parts for Loup Garou.

=== Untamed ===
Construction for Untamed began in late October 2018. The track of Robin Hood was removed along with some parts of the wooden construction. Also, all previous theming elements were taken down. The new track was finished on 16 May 2019. Test rides started three weeks later on 3 June 2019. Untamed opened on 1 July 2019.

== Characteristics ==
The coaster keeps the record for most inversions on a hybrid coaster, namely 5. During the ride, there are 14 airtime moments. The layout features a unique element called a 270 degrees Double Inverting Corner Stall which consists of two inversions right after each other. The element is located in the first turn, right after the first drop.

In the queue line of Untamed, several remnants of Robin Hood can be found, such as track parts and an old train cart.

Untamed has a wilderness theming and the trains are designed to look like an insect.

== Comparison ==
Statistic	Robin Hood	Untamed
Operating years	22 April 2000 - 28 October 2018	1 July 2019–present
Manufacturer	Vekoma	Rocky Mountain Construction
Designer	-	Alan Schilke
Track Type	Wood	Steel
Height	32 m or 105 ft	36 m or 118 ft
Length	1,035 m or 3,396 ft	1,085 m or 3,560 ft
Speed	80 km/h or 50 mph	92 km/h or 57 mph
Duration	2:25	1:45
Inversions	0	5
Capacity	815 persons/hour	900 persons/hour
Entrance		

== Reception and records ==
Untamed was ranked in the Amusement Today's Golden Ticket Awards for best new roller coaster of 2019 in fifth place.

Golden Ticket Awards: Best New Roller Coaster for 2019
Ranking	5

Golden Ticket Awards: Top steel Roller Coasters
Year									1998	1999
Ranking									–	–
Year	2000	2001	2002	2003	2004	2005	2006	2007	2008	2009
Ranking	–	–	–	–	–	–	–	–	–	–
Year	2010	2011	2012	2013	2014	2015	2016	2017	2018	2019
Ranking	–	–	–	–	–	–	–	–	–	–
Year	2020	2021	2022	2023	2024	2025				
Ranking	N/A	–	–	–	42	48				
