= Tusenfryd =

Amusement park in Vinterbro, Norway

- Interactive map of Tusenfryd
- Location: Vinterbro, Norway
- Coordinates: 59.748226°N 10.777019°E
- Opened: 11 June 1988
- Owner: Parques Reunidos
- Slogan: The day is yours!
- Operating season: April to October

Attractions
- Total: 34
- Roller coasters: 8
- Water rides: 3
- Website: www.tusenfryd.no

Tusenfryd (lit. "Thousand Joys", also Common Daisy) is an amusement park at Vinterbro, Norway. The park is located 20 kilometers south of Oslo. Two of the longest motorway corridors in Norway, E6 and E18, meet nearby Tusenfryd and the park is located on the west side near where they meet. Bus line 505 stops at the park's entrance every 15 minutes, departing from the Oslo Bus Terminal in the city center. SpeedMonster, SuperSplash, SpinSpider, ThunderCoaster and SpaceShot make the park visible from the motorway. The park was officially opened on 11 June 1988, after a construction period of 18 months. The park is owned by Parques Reunidos S.A., located in Madrid, Spain. Bjørn Håvard Solli is the park's CEO. The park has 34 attractions and has 500,000 visitors per year.

== History ==
From 1950 to 1985 the park's area belonged to a zoo. When the zoo closed, two entrepreneurs, Tor Erling Pettersen and Terje Buer, signed a lease to rent 115 acres of the zoo's former land and built a theme park. Eighteen months later, on 11 June 1988, Tusenfryd opened and attracted almost half a million people in its first season (a number of visitors that has remained steady ever since). Initially the park was owned by the companies Park Invest and Visit Investments but in 2008 the park was sold to the Spanish-based Parque Reunidos which also owns Norway's largest water park Bø Sommerland.

== The park ==
Even though Tusenfryd is not divided into specifically themed areas there is a section called Morgan Kane Town (opened in 1993), another section is called Vikingland (opened in 1995) and there is a small Fairy Tale Land (opened in 2000). The park's mascot is called Fryd. The park has one of the most innovative entrances of any amusement park (an uphill ride on an escalator through one of the loops of the Speed Monster's roller coaster). The park has flower beds and it is located on a hilly forested area requiring a lot of uphill walking. The actual park occupies 55 acres.

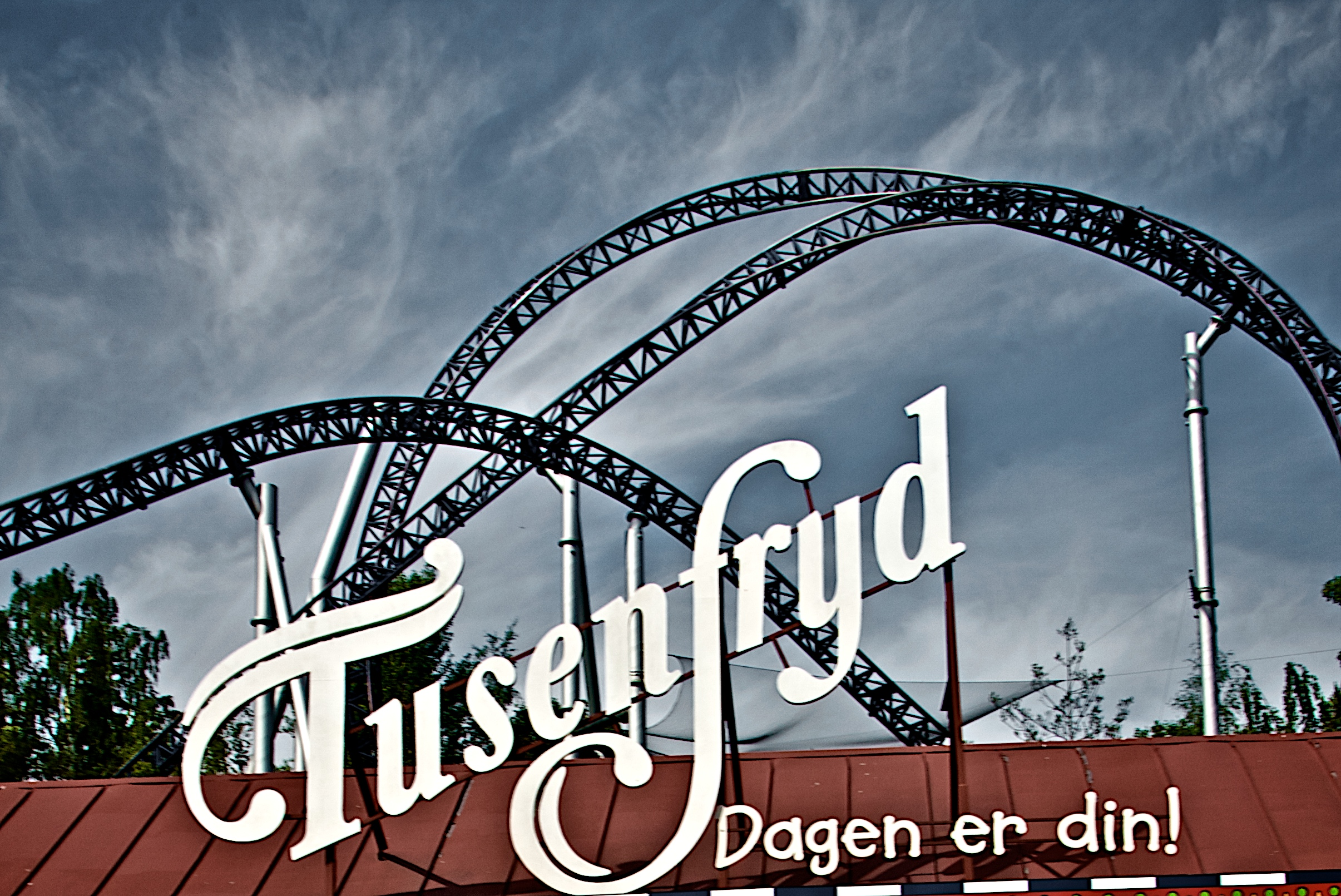
Sign close-up

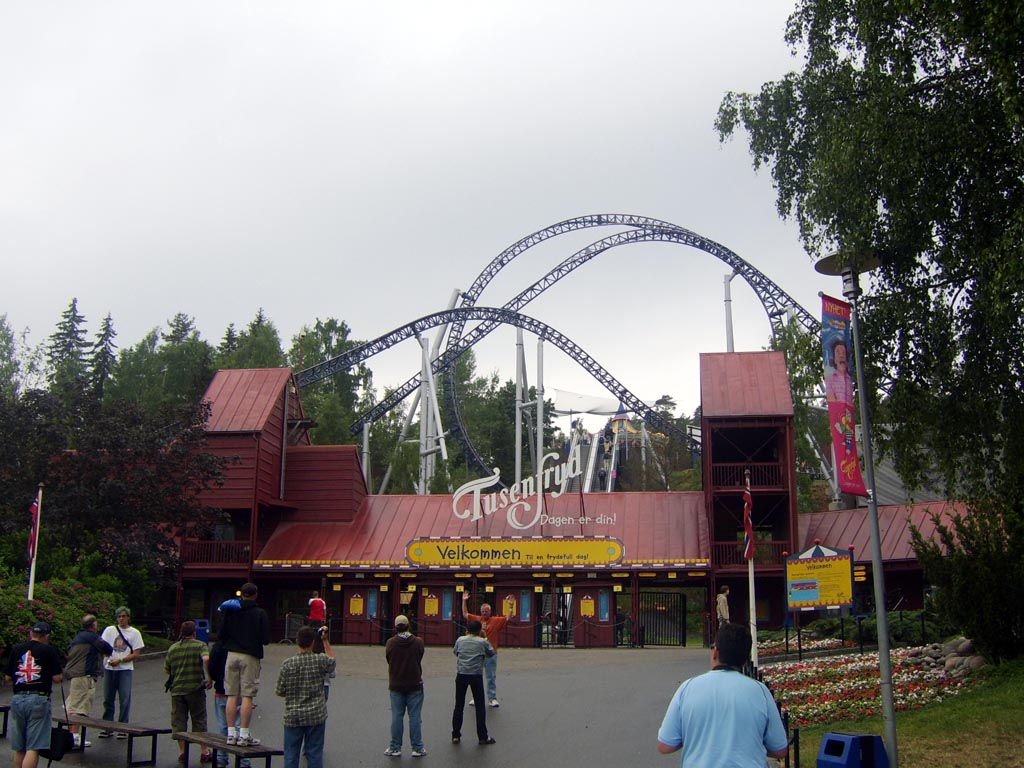
Park Entrance

== Rides ==
=== Roller coasters ===
Ride name	Model	Manufacturer	Opening year	Area	Additional information	Photo
Loopen	Tornado	Vekoma	1988	Route 66	This attraction was built in 1988, and was the first roller coaster in TusenFryd. The name literally means "the loop". The ride is a custom Vekoma looping coaster with a top speed of 75 km/h.	
Speed Monster	Accelerator	Intamin	2006	Route 66	Speed Monster is an Intamin "Accelerator Coaster" with a 6000 HP hydraulic launch that rockets riders from zero to 90 km/h in 2.2 seconds. The rollercoaster then traverses a Norwegian loop around the escalator at the entrance of the park. It was the first Norwegian loop to ever exist on a roller coaster. Riders experience 4 G's, experience weightlessness 7 times, are inverted 3 times. The track is 700 meters long and lasts around 40s. It cost 70 million NOK to build.	
SuperSplash	Water Coaster	MACK Rides	2003		Opened in 2003, Super Splash is a water coaster with a 50° steep second drop, has a top speed of 75 km/h. The ride had a total of 3 boats; it was minimized to 2, but for an unknown reason the ride only has one running. Each boat can hold 16 people. The ride is 320 m long, and produces a 5 m-tall (16 ft) splash when the boat hits the water.	
Dvergbanen	Kiddy coaster	SBF Visa Group	1996		Marketed as the "smallest roller coaster in the world" at 2.5 m high, 26 m long, and with a top speed of 6 km/h. It is also the first roller coaster ever made by SBF Visa Group	
Thundercoaster	Wooden roller coaster	Vekoma	2001	Expedition Lost Kingdoms	Thundercoaster is a "classic" wooden roller coaster built by Vekoma. Riders can experience 3 G's and speeds of up to 100 km/h. The highest point of the coaster is 39 meters (128 ft).	
Western Expressen / Steampunk Hunters	Junior Coaster	Vekoma	2012	Morgan Kane City	A steel sit down coaster that reaches a speed of 40 km/h on a 350 m-long (1,150 ft) track and a height of 17 m. The coaster had formerly operated as Family Adventure at Mirabilandia in Italy from 2001 to 2011. Steampunk Hunters is the virtual reality version of Western-Expressen.	
HuriHuri/SpinnSpider	Spinning Coaster	Zamperla	2022	Expedition Lost Kingdoms	A junior spinning coaster that opened with the newly-designated Expedition Lost Kingdoms zone as a part of an €26 million park renovation over the course of three years.	
Storm - The Dragon Legend	Inverted Infinity Coaster	Gerstlaurer	2023	Dragonville	A launched inverted coaster that travels around 560 meters, even though it is actually 360 meters in track length. This is due to the ride having a multi-pass launch and a second lap around the course. It is also the first inverted infinity coaster from Gerstlaurer	

=== Water rides ===
- Tømmerstupet - A 330-meter-long (1,080 ft) log flume ride that ends in a 7-meter-high (23 ft) drop. Opened in 1988, made by Arrow Dynamics with an on-ride photo camera.
- Badefrydelven a waterslide
- Ragnarok - A rapids ride, made by Hafema with many drops and scenery. Opened in 2016.

=== Other rides ===
- Kanofarten - swinging pirate ship; height limit 1.1 m / 1.2 m alone. Opened in 2008.
- SpaceShot/Jappen - Double Shot. The 65 m-tall (213 ft) / 220-foot-tall (67 m) tower is a standard S&S Power Space Shot. Opened in 1998.
- The SkyCoaster - Skycoaster. an attraction designed to replicate the feeling of skydiving. The ride is not included with standard admission. Opened in 1996, made by SkyCoaster.
- SpinSpider - a giant swing, opened in 2009; height limit 1.4 m. Zamperla.
- Sverre - Wave Swinger; height limit 1.1 m. Opened in 1988. Zierer.
- Store Radiobiler - Bumper cars; height limit 1.2 m / 1.4 m alone. Opened in 1988, SBF Visa.
- Thor's Hammer is a motion-based 3D dark ride made by ETF Ride Systems and P&P Projects that opened in June 2013.
- Nightmare - a 5D Shooting dark ride opened in 2010 then closed in 2022, it replaced spøkelsesslottet. Made by Alterface.

=== Kiddie rides ===
- Ballongferden - mini Ferris wheel; opened in 2005. Zamperla.
- Bestefars Bil - on track vintage cars, opened in 2005.
- Eventyrstien - obstacle course that opened in 1994.
- Finkarusellen - carousel, opened in 1988.
- Fjernestyrte Båter, remote controlled boats.
- Froghopper - mini drop tower, opened in 2000. Zamperla.
- Frydshus, visit the park's mascot Fryd in his new house that opened in 2012.
- Fryds Lekeplass - play area.
- Marihøna - merry go round, opened in 2012. Technical Park.
- MC Hopp - circular bikes, opened in 1988.
- Små Radiobiler - junior bumper cars, opened in 1988. Zamperla.
- Sommerfuglene - magic bikes, opened in 2012. Zamperla.
- Stubbesnurr - spinning tea cups, opened in 2012. Technical Park.
- Traffikfryd - electric cars for kids to drive, opened in 1990.

=== Water park ===
The small water park Badefryd is included in the admission price, it opened in 2000.

- Badefrydelven is a tube ride (2000); height limit 1.2 m.
- Lagoon is a pool with children's water slides, opened in 2000.
- Trippelsklia has 3 body slides, opened in 2002.

== Timeline ==
It was officially opened on 11 June 1988, and took 18 months to build. TusenFryd is the only amusement park inhabitants of Oslo can visit on a one-day trip, giving it an advantage in the Norwegian amusement-park business. As of 2009, TusenFryd averaged 470,000 visitors a year, with a revenue of 174.4 million NOK a year.

- 1988 - Official opening of TusenFryd by Åse Kleveland
- 1990 - Blekkspruten spinner opens
- 1992 - Opening of Tunet, Bungee jumping, climbing wall, driving range and Off-road biketrack
- 1993 - Official opening of Morgan Kane City
- 1994 - "Spøkelsesslottet" opens
- 1995 - VikingLand opens
- 1996 - Den Alle Minste Roller Coaster opens
- 1997 - Bungee JuMping is renamed to SkyCoaster
- 1998 - Opening of SpaceShot launch tower
- 1999 - Opening of MiniFryd
- 2000 - Fantasy Farm and BadeFryd opens
- 2001 - ThunderCoaster opens
- 2002 - Trippelsklia opens in addition to BadeFryd
- 2003 - Official opening of Super Splash
- 2004 - Official opening of RollOver
- 2005 - Ballongferden, Bestefars Bil
- 2006 - Speed Monster opens
- 2008 - Kanofarten swinging ships opens
- 2009 - SpinSpider giant swing opens
- 2010 - Nightmare 5D Dark Ride Shoot Out opens
- 2011 - Skippertaket opens
- 2012 - Western Express Roller Coaster opens as well as Mariehöne, Sommerfuglene, Stubbesnurr
- 2013 - Thor's Hammer opens
- 2016 - Ragnarok (Rapid River) opens
- 2018 - Steampunk Hunters opens

== See also ==
- Tourism in Norway
