= SteamTown (themed area) =

Steamtown
- Theme: Steampunk

Attractions
- Total: 5
- Roller coasters: 1
- Water rides: 1
- Other rides: 2
- Shows: 1

Six Flags America
- Status: Defunct
- Opened: June 22, 2024
- Closed: November 2, 2025
- Replaced: Coyote Creek

SteamTown was a Victorian-era steampunk universe themed section at Six Flags America in Woodmore, Maryland. It opened on June 22, 2024, replacing the former Coyote Creek section of the park.

== Backstory ==
=== Coyote Creek ===
"After many years as a bustling mining town, the gold of Coyote Creek had dried up. A new, mystery investor has come to town and has big plans for the abandoned location."

Professor Screamore was unveiled as the mystery buyer, transforming it with his fantastical inventions.

=== Crackaxle Canyon ===
Professor Screamore purchased the town of Crackaxle Canyon. The abandoned wild West outpost was used for his laboratory of inventions.

== History ==
Before SteamTown, the area it now stands on was previously, a Coyote Creek theme area from 1994 until 2022. In 2022, Coyote Creek was closed and transformed to SteamTown in 2024 as a new original theme that included a new ride and attractions called SteamWhirler and SteamHeist. Other rides were rebranded, such as the Mind Eraser and Renegade Rapids.

== Locations ==
Location	First season	Last season	Notes
Six Flags America	2024	2025	A new theme park area for Six Flags America in 2024, to replace Coyote Creek.
Six Flags New England	2026		A new ride debuted in a steampunk theme opened in Crackaxle Canyon.

== Attractions ==
=== Flat rides and roller coasters ===
Attraction name	Ride type	Manufacturer	Locations	Notes
SteamWhirler (2024)	Nebulaz	Zamperla	Six Flags America	
QuantumCanyon Rapids (2024)	River rapids ride	Hopkins Rides	Six Flags America	*Opened in the 1994 season as Renegade Rapids.
Professor Screamore's SkyWinder (2024)	Suspended Looping Coaster	Vekoma	Six Flags America	*Opened in the 1995 season as Mind Eraser.
ElectroDerby (2024)	Bumper Cars	Preston Amusements	Six Flags America	*Opened in the 1990 season as Los Coches Chocos, then rebranded as Coyote Creek Crazy Cars in 1994.
Quantum Accelerator (2026)	Motorbike roller coaster	Intamin	Six Flags New England	

=== Restaurants ===
Restaurant name	Location	Serves	Ref.
Fillament's SteamPub	Six Flags America	A pub that serves craft beers and themed cocktails.	

=== Entertainment ===
Entertainment name	Location	Serves	Ref.
SteamHeist (2024)	Six Flags America	A high-energy stunt show.	

=== Shops ===
Store name	Location	Notes	Ref.
Clockwork Confection Co. (2024)	Six Flags America	Candy store.	
Looking Glass Creations (2024)	Six Flags America	Merchandise store featuring steampunk-themed toys, souvenirs, and apparel.	
