= Six Flags Darien Lake =

Amusement park in Darien Center, New York

- Previously known as Darien Lake Fun Country (1981–1982); Darien Lake (1982–1999); Darien Lake Theme Park Resort (2007–2018)
- Logo used since 2025

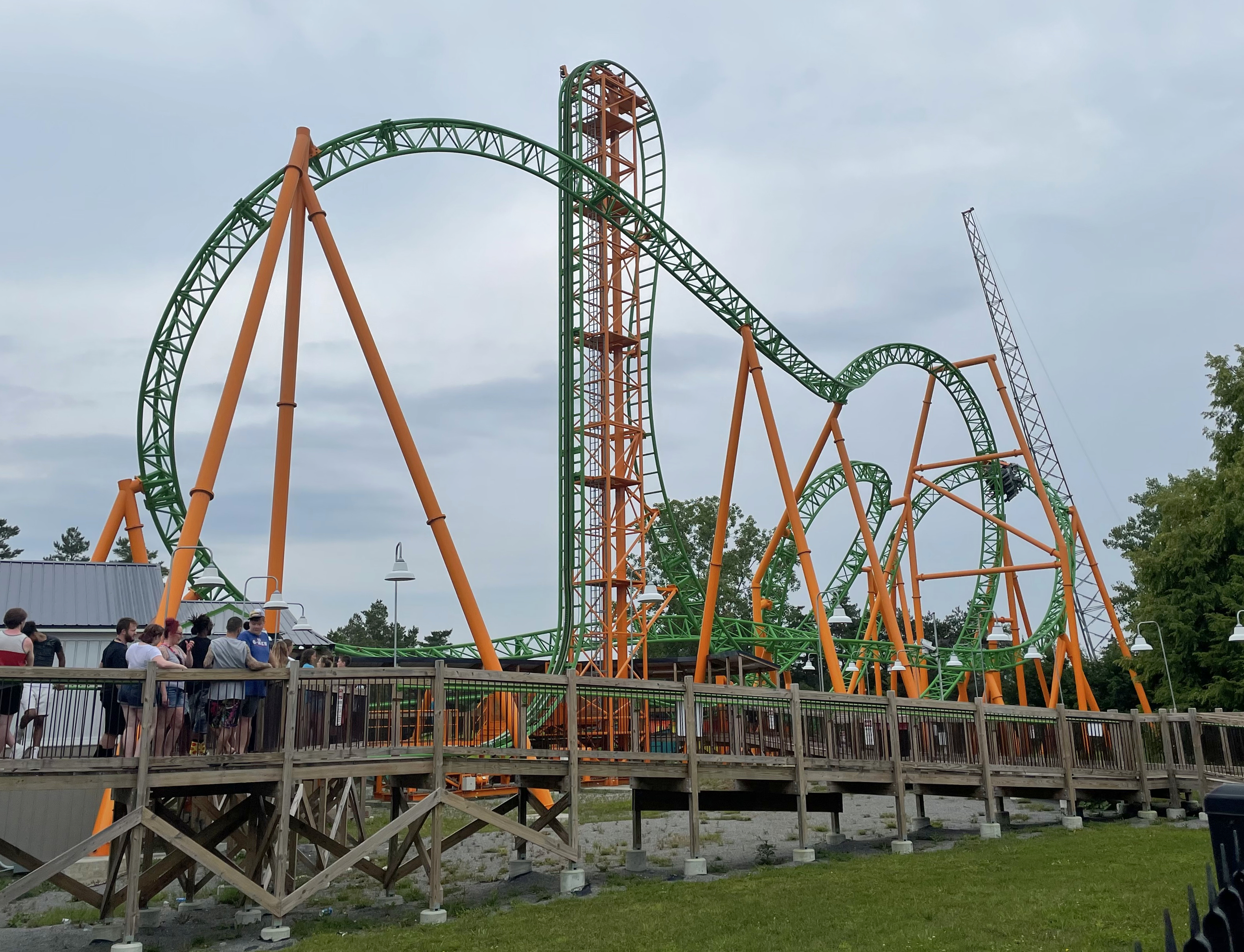
- Tantrum, a roller coaster at Six Flags Darien Lake
- Interactive map of Six Flags Darien Lake
- Location: Darien Center, New York, United States
- Coordinates: 42.92851°N 78.38488°W
- Status: Operating
- Opened: May 1981
- Owner: EPR Properties
- Operated by: Six Flags
- Slogan: The Thrill Capital of New York
- Operating season: May through October
- Attendance: 1.5 million
- Area: 953.2 acres (385.7 ha)

Attractions
- Total: 45
- Roller coasters: 8
- Water rides: 10
- Website: sixflags.com/darienlake

Six Flags Darien Lake (Note: also known as Six Flags Darien Lake Resort & Six Flags Darien Lake and Hurricane Harbor) is a 953.2-acre (3.85-km^{2}) amusement park and resort located in Darien Center, New York. Six Flags Darien Lake features an amusement park, a water park, a campground, and lodging. It is owned by EPR Properties and operated by Six Flags.

== History ==
=== Paul Snyder ===
In 1954, Darien Lake was excavated and filled. The lake had already been a popular swimming destination for many years. In 1964, investor Paul Snyder acquired a 164-acre (66.37 ha) parcel of land bordering the lake and opened a small 23-site campground and picnic area. Snyder continued acquiring more land, eventually increasing his holdings to almost 1,000 acres (4.05 km^{2}) of land. This land included seven lakes, the largest of which was Darien Lake. He stocked one of the smaller lakes, Trout Pond, with fish, increased the number of campsites, and added activities for resort guests such as a small petting zoo, horseback and pony rides, paddleboats, skateboarding, tennis courts, and miniature golf.

From the late 1970s and into the early 1980s, Snyder added more attractions, including a set of water slides on a hill near the park's entrance called Rainbow Mountain, officially creating an amusement park, which at the time was called Darien Lake Fun Country. Snyder made a deal with HUSS Park Attractions, turning Darien Lake into the North American showcase for the German manufacturer's new rides. Through this deal, the park offered HUSS a location to display rides to potential American and Canadian buyers, and acquired rides such as Pirate, Ranger, Thrillbilly, and Corn Popper. In 1982, the newly merged Arrow Huss built and opened the park's first major roller coaster, Viper.

=== Funtime Parks ===
In 1983, Snyder sold a 50% stake in the park to Funtime, Inc., which also owned Geauga Lake and Wyandot Lake Park at the time. The park's name was shortened to simply Darien Lake, and Funtime began to introduce several major improvements and attractions. Funtime's first addition was the Vekoma-built Ferris wheel, which had previously been showcased at the 1982 World's Fair in Knoxville, Tennessee, and was the largest in the United States at the time. Live entertainment was also brought to the park, with the construction of the Tops Jubilee Theater (later the Grande Theatre), and the Lakeside Amphitheater, which was a large concert stage on the south side of the main lake. It presented many well-known acts, including The Who, Alice Cooper, and Black Sabbath. Cinema 2000, a wide-angle movie theatre, was also installed in the back of the park.

In the late 1980s, a water skiing show called Splashmania, was featured on Fun Lake. The improvements continued throughout the 1980s and early 1990s, with the 1988 addition of a themed kids area, Adventure Land for Kids, and the 1989 addition of the Grizzly Run river rapids ride. In 1990, six new water slides were added to the water park, and the water park was officially named Barracuda Bay. It now required an extra admission fee to enter, and several common water park amenities were added. Following the success of the Dinn Corporation-built Raging Wolf Bobs at Geauga Lake in 1988, Funtime contracted the company to build a new wooden coaster for Darien Lake. The Predator roller coaster opened in May 1990 and was met with praise. Around this time, Paul Snyder, sold his remaining share of the park to Funtime, turning over all control of it to them.

In 1992, a laser light show called Laser Light Fantasy (now known as Laser Light Night Time Spectacular) debuted, including laser graphics and fireworks. In 1993, this show was permanently moved to the Lakeside Amphitheater, while concert events were moved to the new and larger Darien Lake Performing Arts Center. In 1994, the old Rainbow Mountain water slides were replaced with a new slide complex known as 'Cuda Falls, and Barracuda Bay dropped its extra admission charge, becoming included with base park admission.

=== Premier Parks/Six Flags ===
In 1995, growing regional park chain Premier Parks bought Funtime, Inc. and its three parks. Upon taking control of Darien Lake, Premier dove right into changes and additions. In 1995, Skycoaster opened, located over Fun Lake. In 1996, Adventure Land for Kids was replaced by Popeye's Seaport, with all-new kiddie rides, including a miniature Ferris wheel, a hand-cranked train ride, a submarine ride, a play place, and several live-action children's shows, as well as several amenities. A new miniature golf course opened behind the then-new kiddie area near Viper, which replaced the old course.

A water park expansion took place through 1996 and 1997 with the Hook's Lagoon children's area and the Crocodile Isle wave pool, as well as many new food locations and improved pathways between sections of the park and new midway game offerings. Three former Adventure Land for Kids rides were moved to another part of the park as the Tiny Trio in 1997. From 1996 to 1999, Premier would also install a new roller coaster each year: the enclosed Nightmare At Phantom Cave in 1996, the inverted The Mind Eraser in 1997, the shuttle Boomerang: Coast to Coaster in 1998, and the Superman – Ride of Steel hypercoaster in 1999.

Nightmare At Phantom Cave was removed in 1998 and relocated to sister park Great Escape. In 1998, Premier purchased Six Flags and began to rebrand its own parks with the Six Flags name. In May 1999, Six Flags Darien Lake opened under its new name, with several major changes. Premier brought Six Flags' accessible IPs, Looney Tunes and DC Comics, into the parks. Popeye's Seaport was rethemed to Looney Tunes Seaport, a show called Batman Thrill Spectacular was added to the vacant Nightmare At Phantom Cave building, and four water slides (Hydro Force, Pipeline Plunge, Riptide Run and Torpedo Rapids) were removed from Barracuda Bay. The Cinema 2000 theater was replaced by a Scrambler ride, a new midway stage was added, and a new gift shop opened. The Crazy Quilt Calypso ride was removed and replaced with the Lasso Wave Swinger ride. Premier Parks took on the name Six Flags Inc. in 2000, and continued adding new attractions. The next major attractions installed were the Twister Top Spin ride in 2000, and the Shipwreck Falls shoot-the-chutes ride in 2002, the latter of which replaced the old Cascade Canyon water slides and Slingshot. The Tornado water slide was added to Barracuda Bay in 2005.

==== Troubled times ====
2006 was a year of turmoil for Six Flags and its parks as the company began to struggle with debt. For the 2006 season, Six Flags moved Big Kahuna, a family water slide, from recently-closed Six Flags AstroWorld to Barracuda Bay, and brought the Batman The Escape roller coaster from Six Flags AstroWorld to store at Darien Lake, with plans to install it there at a later date. Only a month into the 2006 season, however, Six Flags began pulling back the DC theming from Six Flags Darien Lake, and announced that the park, along with eight other parks, was being considered for sale.

In October 2006, after a season of shortened operating hours, Six Flags officially announced the parks were being offered for sale as a package. Paul Snyder stated in a radio interview he would have considered purchasing Six Flags Darien Lake from Six Flags if they allowed the parks to be sold individually. In January 2007, Six Flags announced a sale of seven of the eight parks to PARC Management. Six Flags chose to retain one of the parks it had originally offered for sale.

=== PARC Management/CNL Lifestyle (2007-2010) ===
Darien Lake logo used from 2007 to 2012

In April 2007, Six Flags completed the sale of Darien Lake and six other parks to PARC Management. Upon completion of the sale, PARC entered into a fifty-year contract with CNL Lifestyle for lease of the park.

Because of the timing of the final sale with respect to the park's opening, PARC Management was unable to make any major changes for the 2007 season. The only changes for the season were the addition of a new show, Le Grande Cirque, which replaced Batman Thrill Spectacular, and the removal of all Six Flags, Looney Tunes, and DC Comics signage and references, including in the park's name, which reverted to simply Darien Lake again. Notably, the Looney Tunes Seaport children's area was renamed to Adventure Isle. In 2008, the park debuted Orange County Choppers MotoCoaster, its first launched rollercoaster and the first Zamperla Motocoaster in the United States. PARC Management also pledged to lower admission prices that had risen under Six Flags ownership. The Floodgate Falls slide closed after the 2008 season.

In March 2010, Darien Lake renamed Barracuda Bay to Splashtown at Darien Lake, and began a large expansion of the water park, installing several new attractions and repainting the 'Cuda Falls complex. Among these new attractions were a 16-foot-wide (4.9 m) lazy river called Flotation Station, the Swirl City four-slide complex, and a kiddie wave pool called Lazy Days Lagoon. 2010 also saw some minor park changes, such as Viper being repainted, The Predator receiving new trains, and the addition of the Critter Chase Balloon Race ride in the Beaver Brothers Bay children's area (formerly Adventure Isle), replacing the Raft Adventure kiddie ride.

CNL Lifestyle announced in early 2011 that it had reached an agreement to terminate PARC Management's lease of Darien Lake and up to 17 other locations. According to their 2010 SEC filings, the move was made after PARC Management defaulted on their lease obligations.

=== Herschend/CNL Lifestyle (2011-2014) ===
In 2011, Herschend assumed day-to-day operation and management of Darien Lake and Elitch Gardens Theme Park, another park previously owned by PARC Management. The new Rowdy's Ridge children's area opened in 2012 with several family rides.

For the 2013 season, the Blast Off drop tower was installed in the newly-rethemed Waterfront Boardwalk area. 2013 also saw major renovations to rides like Grand Carousel and Giant Wheel, along with new dining options. Laserblast received several improvements and was rebranded to Ignite the Night. The UFO ride and the 'Cuda Falls waterslides were removed, and the Scrambler ride returned after two years in storage.

=== Premier Parks, LLC (2014-2018) ===
Herschend's lease ended after the 2014 season, and was subsequently taken over by Premier Parks, LLC. New rides installed during this period include Rolling Thunder, a 72-foot (21.9 m) Larson Loop; Brain Drain, two dropping body water slides; and Ripcurl Racer, a six-lane racing water slide. Following the 2016 season, CNL Lifestyle sold Darien Lake and 14 other amusement parks to EPR Properties. The park continued to be leased and operated by Premier Parks, with no immediate change in operations or staffing. Tantrum, a Gerstlauer Euro-Fighter roller coaster, opened for the 2018 season, the park's first new coaster in 10 years.

=== Six Flags/EPR Properties (2018-present) ===
In May 2018, Six Flags acquired rights to operate the park once more, with the park remaining under the ownership of EPR Properties. For the 2019 season, the park reinstated the Six Flags Darien Lake branding, though it did not bring back the Looney Tunes or DC theming. SkyScreamer, a Funtime Star Flyer, was installed during this season as well. For the 2020 season, it was announced that Wahoo Wave, a ProSlide Technology TornadoWAVE slide, would be added to the newly renamed Hurricane Harbor water park.

Although the installation of Wahoo Wave was successful, the park did not open in 2020 due to the COVID-19 pandemic, with the exception of the campgrounds. On September 11, 2020, the park announced that all season passes and tickets purchased for the 2020 season would be carried over to the 2021 season. The park reopened in 2021.

== Current rides and attractions ==
=== Roller coasters ===
| Ride | Opened | Manufacturer | Description |
|---|---|---|---|
| Boomerang: Coast to Coaster | 1998 | Vekoma | A steel shuttle roller coaster (Boomerang). The coaster features two 120-foot (37 m) tall backwards lift hills, a cobra roll, and a loop. The train passes forwards and backwards through both inversion elements, making for a total of six upside-down moments. |
| Hoot N Holler | 1981 | Zierer | A steel children's roller coaster. It opened in 1981 as Ladybug. It was renamed to Nessie the Dreamy Dragon when it was moved to Adventure Land for Kids in 1988, and it retained this name until it was moved again in 1997. As part of this move alongside two other children's rides, it became part of the "Tiny Trio" and was renamed to Brain Teaser, and repainted to match the color scheme of the then-new nearby The Mind Eraser. In 2012, the train was repainted to resemble an owl, and the ride was given the name Hoot N Holler, to fit the new Rowdy's Ridge children's area theme. |
| The Mind Eraser | 1997 | Vekoma | A steel inverted roller coaster (Suspended Looping Coaster), the only one of its type in the state of New York. This ride is 110 feet (34 m) tall, and features five inversions. The ride did not operate during the 2024 season due to several renovations, including the installation of two new trains with upgraded restraints, a repaint, and the reprofiling of several track sections. It reopened in 2025. |
| Moto Coaster | 2008 | Zamperla | The first steel motorbike roller coaster in the United States. The coaster launches riders from 0 to 40 miles per hour (0 to 64 km/h) in 2 seconds, followed by several dips and turns. It was originally known as Orange County Choppers Motocoaster as part of a partnership with the local Orange County Choppers, but its name was shortened to simply Moto Coaster in 2010 when the naming rights for the ride expired. |
| The Predator | 1990 | Dinn Corporation | The park's only wooden roller coaster. The Predator currently holds the title of New York's largest wooden roller coaster at 95 feet (29 m) tall. In 2010, used trains from The Voyage were added to the ride, replacing its original trailered trains. Previously to the installation of these new trains, it was the last roller coaster to operate with trailered PTC trains. From 2022 onwards, it has continually received large amounts of Titan Track retracking from Great Coasters International, making it a hybrid coaster. |
| Ride of Steel | 1999 | Intamin | A steel hyper roller coaster, formerly known as Superman – Ride of Steel. With a top height of 208 feet (63 m) and a maximum speed of 73 miles per hour (117 km/h), the coaster is the tallest and fastest in New York, and one of Six Flags Darien Lake's largest attractions. |
| Tantrum | 2018 | Gerstlauer | A steel Euro-Fighter roller coaster. Tantrum features a 98.4 foot (30 m) vertical lift hill with a 97-degree beyond vertical drop and three inversions. It reaches top speeds of 52.8 miles per hour (85.0 km/h). |
| Viper | 1982 | Arrow Huss | A steel roller coaster. Viper was the first coaster in the world to feature five inversions, and it held the record of most inversions in the world until Vortex surpassed it in 1987. It is 121 feet (37 m) tall, but features a largest drop of only 75 feet (23 m). |

=== Thrill rides ===
| Ride | Opened | Manufacturer | Model | Description |
|---|---|---|---|---|
| Blast Off | 2013 | S&S Power | Space Shot | A tower ride that uses compressed air to rapidly propel riders up a 185-foot tall tower then lower them with a series of air-cushioned bounces back to the loading platform. Relocated from Alabama Adventure & Splash Adventure, where it had operated as StratosFear Screamer from 2001 to 2011. Stands on the former spot of the Raging Seas Sea Storm ride. |
| Rolling Thunder | 2015 | Larson International | 22M Giant Loop | A 72-foot (21.9 m) loop. The ride's train is rocked back and forth, elevating on every pass through the station, until it has gained enough momentum to make it completely around the loop. Located on the former site of the UFO ride. |
| SkyScreamer | 2019 | Funtime | Starflyer | A tower that swings riders 242 feet (73.8 m) high in the air at 35 mph (56 km/h). |
| Silver Bullet | 1981 | Heinz Fähtz | Enterprise | Features 20 swinging gondolas, which travel in a circular clockwise motion on a large wheel. Once it achieves a fast enough speed, the wheel raises riders to a 90-degree angle and spins the riders upside down. It is the only Enterprise manufactured by Heinz Fähtz still in operation. |

=== Upcharge rides ===
| Ride | Opened | Manufacturer | Model | Description |
|---|---|---|---|---|
| Boat Docks - Midway Marina | Unknown | Unknown | Paddleboats | Guests can rent a paddle boat and paddle across Fun Lake |
| Grand Prix Speedway | 1987 | Unknown | Go-karts | A go-kart track |
| Skycoaster | 1995 | Skycoaster Company, LLC | Skycoaster | A ride that hoists riders to 180 feet (55 m) and releases them in a swinging motion. It was known as Red Hawk from 2013 to 2022. |
| Slingshot | 2002 | US Thrill Rides | Slingshot | A slingshot ride located at the front of the park. It is the tallest attraction at Darien Lake at 300 feet (91 m). |

=== Family rides ===
Many of the rides manufactured by HUSS Park Attractions were installed as part of a deal with HUSS to use Six Flags Darien Lake as a North American showcase for HUSS's new rides in the early 1980s.

| Ride | Opened | Manufacturer | Model | Description |
|---|---|---|---|---|
| Bear Valley Bumper Buggies | 1981 | DUCE Ride Manufacturers | Bumper cars | Riders steer their cars in any direction across the rectangular floor, bumping other cars out of their way |
| Corn Popper | 1982 | HUSS Park Attractions | Swing Around | The ride rotates in a circle as its arms swing out and retract. It was renamed Rodeo Round Up when the park was owned by Six Flags, but the name was restored to Corn Popper in 2010. Part of the HUSS showcase. |
| Grand Carousel | 1981 | International Amusement Devices | Carousel | A traditional carousel. It received a large refurbishment before the start of the 2013 season. |
| Haymaker | 1981 | Heinz Fähtz | Paratrooper | A Paratrooper-style ride, the only one of its kind by its manufacturer. Features ten umbrella-covered cars that rotate counter-clockwise on a hydraulically-powered arm. During the ride, the arm raises to a 45-degree angle. |
| Hornet's Nest | 2012 | Larson International | Flying Scooters | Consists of ride vehicles suspended from arms attached to a center post. When in operation, a motor causes the arms to spin, with centrifugal forces causing the ride vehicles to fly outwards. Riders can control the movement of their vehicles with a rudder. |
| Lasso | 1981 | Zierer | Wave Swinger | A swing ride that lifts and undulates. Lasso was previously located where the Emporium currently stands. It is now located where Crazy Quilt once stood. |
| Pirate | 1981 | HUSS Park Attractions | Pirate ship | A large pirate-themed boat suspended from an A-frame structure. The boat swings back and forth until it achieves a height of 60 feet (18 m) and is at a 75-degree angle from its initial resting position, giving riders the sensation of weightlessness. Located at the edge of Fun Lake. Part of the HUSS showcase. |
| Scrambler | 1999 | Eli Bridge Company | Scrambler | Riders are seated in small carriages clustered together and connected by beams at the top to a central point. The clustered vehicles are spun in one direction, while the ride as a whole spins in the opposite direction. It was removed before the 2012 season to make way for the Rowdy's Ridge children's area. The ride remained in storage until the 2014 season, when it returned in a new location next to The Predator. |
| Sleighride | 1981 | Mack Rides | Matterhorn | Consists of a number of cars attached to axles that swing in and out. The hill and valley shape of the ride causes a pronounced swinging motion. The faster the ride goes, the more dramatic the swinging motion. |
| Tin Lizzy's | 1981 | Arrow Dynamics | Antique cars | An antique car ride |

=== Water rides ===
| Ride | Opened | Manufacturer | Model | Description |
|---|---|---|---|---|
| Shipwreck Falls | 2002 | Intamin | Shoot the chutes | Consists of a flat-bottomed boat that goes up a lift hill, rounds a turn, and falls down a ramp into a massive lagoon, soaking all riders and nearby guests watching |

=== Kiddie rides ===
The first children's area at the park, Adventure Land for Kids, opened in 1988. In 1996, it was replaced by Popeye's Seaport, which saw several name changes as the park switched ownership. It was renamed to Looney Tunes Seaport in 1999, and again to Adventure Isle in 2010. It was eventually renamed to Beaver Brothers Bay, a name it still retains today. Beaver Brothers Bay is located on an island originally home to Treasure Island Golf. It is surrounded by the midway.

For a time, three kiddie rides known as the "Tiny Trio" that had been salvaged from the removal of Adventure Land for Kids, were located near The Mind Eraser. In 2012, this area was further expanded into a new children's area called Rowdy's Ridge.

| Name | Opened | Area | Manufacturer | Model | Description |
|---|---|---|---|---|---|
| Beaver Dam Explorer | 1996 | Beaver Brothers Bay | Zamperla | Crazy Bus | Themed to a submarine. Formerly called S.S. Popeye (1996–1998), Daffy's Diver (1999–2006), and Dipsy Diver (2007–2011). |
| Bucky's Barrels | 1996 | Beaver Brothers Bay | Zamperla | Sun & Moon | Barrel-themed miniature Ferris wheel. Formerly called Olive's Barrels of Fun (1996–1998), Michigan J. Frog's Ferris Wheel (1999–2006), and Barrels of Fun (2007–2011). |
| Chucky's Mud Buckets | 1996 | Beaver Brothers Bay | Zamperla | Mini Tea Cup | A miniature teacups ride. Formerly called Spinach Spinnaker (1996–1998), Bugs' Carrot Cans (1999–2006), and Twisty Tubs (2007–2011). |
| Critter Chase | 2010 | Rowdy's Ridge | Zamperla | Mini Jet | An animal-themed ride where the rider manually controls the movement of their animal. It originally operated from 1988 to 1997. The ride returned in 2010. |
| Darien Lake Railway | 1996 | Beaver Brothers Bay | Zamperla | Miniature train | A small miniature train ride. Formerly called Muscle Junction (1996–1998), Elmer Fudd's Tiny Tooter Railroad (1999–2006), and Runaway Railway (2007–2011). |
| Moose on the Loose | 2012 | Rowdy's Ridge | Metallbau | Pony Trek | Riders sit atop a runaway moose through multiple comedic scenes |
| Raccoon Rally | 1981 | Rowdy's Ridge | Unknown | Kiddie Bumper cars | Has been relocated several times. Formerly known as Dodgems. |
| Tree Stump Turnpike | 1996 | Beaver Brothers Bay | Zamperla | Convoy | A convoy of trucks that slowly traverses a winding track. Formerly called Brutus' Monster Trucks (1996–1998), Foghorn's Coastal Delivery (1999–2006), and Monster Trucks (2007–2011). |
| Wally's Weather Balloons | 1996 | Beaver Brothers Bay | Zamperla | Samba Balloon Race | A Samba Balloon Race ride. Formerly called Up Up and Ahoy (1996–1998), Seaport Weather Balloons (1999–2006), and Weather Balloons (2007–2011). |
| Woody's Whirlers | 1996 | Beaver Brothers Bay | Zamperla | Mini Swings | A miniature Wave Swinger ride. Formerly called Swee' Pea's Swings (1996–1998), Taz Twister (1999–2006), and Whirlwind (2007–2011). |

=== Hurricane Harbor ===
All water park attractions are included with the base price of admission.

== Entertainment ==
All show venues are included with the base price of admission.

| Name | Featured shows | Notes |
|---|---|---|
| Beaver Brothers Bay Showplace | Backstage Variety Show (2018), The Wizard's Apprentice (2016–2017), Character Tales (2015), multiple shows in 2013, Beaver Mania & Beaver Fever Dance Party (2012), Thomas & Friends Full Steam Ahead Live! (2011), Bob the Builder Let's Recycle (2010), Bob the Builder Live (2009), An Alarming Adventure (2008), Blake Daring's Storybook Adventure (2007), Bugs Bunny Goes Hollywood (2002, 2004–2006) | Features shows for families and children. Located in Beaver Brothers Bay. |
| Gazebo Stage | Hypnotist Tammy Barton (–2013, 2018–19), Jump, Jive and Swing (2011), Midway Dance Party Blow Out (2007–2008, 2011), The Heart Of Country (2010), Country Unleashed (2009), And The Answer Is! (2008), Keepin' the Beat (2007), Rockin' Country (2003–2006), Bahama Boys/Street Pop (2002) | Outdoor stage in the midway. Sometimes holds events like karaoke. |
| Grande Theatre | Aaron Radatz Illusion Show (2013, 2018–19), American Pop (2017), American Rock (2016), World of Magic (2015), Street Beat (2013), Legends of Rock (2011), RockNation! Don't Stop Believin' (2010), RockNation! (2009), Rhythmnicity (2008), The Magic of Cliff Hopkins & Kelly (2007), Totally Pop (2006), America: State of Rhythm (2005), American Pop (2004), Radioactive (2003), Broadway Rhythm (2002) | Opened as the Tops Jubilee Theatre in 1980, and has also been known as the Tops Palace Theatre |
| Lakeside Amphitheatre | Laser Light Night Time Spectacular (2023–present), Ignite the Night: COLORBLAST (2016–2019), Ignite the Night (2013–2015), LaserBlast! (1998–2012), LaserLight Reality (1995–1997), LaserLight Fantasy (1992–1994) | The Lakeside Amphitheatre used to be the home of major concerts and other events until the 1990s, when the Performing Arts Center opened. It also held several concerts that were free to park guests. |

=== Fright Fest ===
The original Six Flags Fright Fest was an annual Halloween event held at the end of the operating season during weekends in October from 1998 to 2006. Fright Fest featured several themed areas (including Bloodstone Hollow, a free haunted graveyard and town; and Brutal Planet, an upcharge haunted house) and new live shows (Dead Man's Party in the Grande Theater and Laser Spooktacular at the Lakeside Amphitheatre.) When the park was sold to PARC Management in 2007, the event was rebranded to Fall Family Fun Fest, adding family-oriented attractions such as hay mazes and pumpkin painting, in addition to the haunted houses. During this event, admission to the park was free, with individual charges for each ride and attraction. A re-branded FrightFest returned in 2008 with similar elements to the former Six Flags Fright Fest (including haunted houses and the Trick or Treat Trail) and additional new attractions, such as the Fright Night Field Trip, a bus ride through the campgrounds, which were decorated to appear haunted. FrightFest was removed from the park in 2015 and replaced by Harvest Fest. In 2018, the Six Flags Fright Fest event returned, providing more intense horror attractions alongside the family-friendly Harvest Fest. Harvest Fest did not return after the 2021 season. In 2022, Oktoberfest took its place, featuring German food, beer, and live music.

=== Magic of Lights ===
In August 2021, the park introduced a Christmas lights display for the 2021 holiday season. The 1.25-mile (2 km) drive-through holiday light display ran from November 19, 2021, through January 2, 2022. The event was free to season pass holders and did not return the following holiday season.

== Former attractions ==
| Ride | Opened | Closed | Manufacturer | Description |
|---|---|---|---|---|
| BMX Motocross | 1980s | 2011 | Hampton Amusement Company | A circular kiddie ride featuring BMX-style motorbikes that jumped over hills as they moved. It was originally located near Giant Wheel. The ride moved to Adventure Land for Kids in 1988, and was later part of the Tiny Trio in 1997, before it was relocated to Elitch Gardens Theme Park in 2012 as Tike Bikes. |
| Boat Tag | 1996 | 1999 | Unknown | A boat ride that was located where the Midway Gazebo Stage now stands |
| Boats | 1980s | 1990s | Unknown | A small boat ride. It was located near Giant Wheel. |
| Crazy Quilt | 1981 | 1998 | Mack Rides | A Calypso ride. It was located where Lasso currently stands. |
| Earth Orbiter | 1980s | 1996 | Zierer | A small kiddie Ferris wheel that was part of Adventure Land for Kids |
| Funtime Junction | 1980s | 1997 | Chance Rides | A miniature railway located around Elk Lake in Adventure Land for Kids |
| Giant Wheel | 1983 | 2020 | Vekoma | A 165 feet (50 m) tall Ferris wheel. It was originally part of the 1982 World's Fair in Knoxville, Tennessee, and was the tallest in the United States when constructed. The ride did not operate during the 2021 season, and was removed prior to the 2022 season. |
| Grizzly Run | 1989 | 2019 | Intamin | A river rapids ride. Removed as part of corporate's 15 rides removal initiative in response to the economic fallout of the COVID-19 pandemic. The area is now largely used for storage. |
| Monty's Moon Walk | 1980s | 1996 | Unknown | A ball pit in Adventure Land for Kids |
| Mountain View Golf | 1996 | 2012 | Unknown | A miniature golf course located under Viper. It replaced Treasure Island Golf. |
| Nightmare At Phantom Cave | 1996 | 1998 | Schwarzkopf | An enclosed Jet Star roller coaster. This coaster was relocated to Six Flags Darien Lake from Six Flags Kentucky Kingdom in 1996 and housed in the building next to Viper. It was relocated to Six Flags Great Escape in 1999 as Nightmare at Crack Axle Canyon. |
| Raft Adventure | 1996 | 2010 | Zamperla | A mini jet ride themed to wooden rafts. The ride was replaced by Critter Chase. |
| Raging Seas | 1981 | 2012 | Mack Rides | A Sea Storm ride that featured small hills and had boat-themed rider vehicles. The boats would spin as they went up and down the hills. It was called Sea Storm until 1999. It was removed at the end of the 2012 season and was replaced by Blast Off. |
| Ranger | 1982 | 2015 | HUSS Park Attractions | A Ranger ride, the first of its kind in North America. It was the only HUSS Park Attractions Ranger ride still operating in North America when it closed in 2015. It was removed due to high maintenance costs and a lack of spare parts available, as well as to make way for the addition of Rolling Thunder. Part of the HUSS Park Attractions showcase. |
| Red Baron | 1980s | Unknown | Unknown | A kiddie airplane ride that was located near Giant Wheel |
| Rowdy's Heave Ho | 2012 | 2022 | HEEGE | A lift tower. Guests pull themselves up a tower and then drop down. |
| SS Looney Tunes | 1996 | 2004 | Unknown | A play structure themed to a ship. It was called SS Olive from 1996 to 1998. |
| Thrillbilly | 1981 | 1983 | HUSS Park Attractions | A Troika ride located where The Predator now stands. Part of the HUSS Park Attractions showcase. |
| Treasure Island Golf | 1981 | 1996 | Unknown | Located where Beaver Brothers Bay now stands. It was replaced by Mountain View Golf. |
| Turbobungy | 2002 | 2007 | Unknown | An upcharge trampoline. Riders were attached to bungee cords while jumping. This attraction was located in the vicinity of The Mind Eraser. |
| UFO | 1981 | 2012 | HUSS Park Attractions | A UFO ride. It was removed prior to the 2013 season due to unreliability with maintenance. Part of the HUSS Park Attractions showcase. |
| Thunder Rapids | 1981 | 2017 | Arrow Dynamics | A log flume which was located where Tantrum now stands. Removed at the end of the 2017 season due to high maintenance costs, as well to make way for Tantrum. |
| Twister | 2000 | 2018 | HUSS Park Attractions | A Top Spin ride. It was themed to look like it was made out of wood. Removed at the end of the 2018 season and replaced by SkyScreamer. |

=== Past entertainment ===
Former entertainment venues within the park.

| Name | Opened | Closed | Type | Description |
|---|---|---|---|---|
| 50's Bandstand | Unknown | Unknown | Music show | Located where the queue for The Predator is now |
| Big Top Circus | Unknown | 1996 | Circus show | Located in Adventure Land for Kids |
| Cinema 2000 | Unknown | 1999 | 3D cinema | Located where Rowdy's Ridge is today |
| Galaxy Theatre | 1999 | Unknown | Theater | Originally housed Nightmare At Phantom Cave, an indoor roller coaster. It was called the Gotham City Theatre while hosting the Batman Thrill Spectacular show. It was closed for the 2012 and 2013 seasons, with the exception of the building being temporarily used in 2013 during Kingdom Bound and for a haunted attraction during Fright Fest. Featured several shows, including Nik Wallenda: Beyond the Falls (2014), Sea Lion Splash (2010–2011), Survivor Live! (2009), Cirque Nouveau (2008), Le Grande Cirque (2007), and Batman Thrill Spectacular (1999–2006). |
| Splashmania | Unknown | Unknown | Water ski show | A water ski show on Fun Lake. The pole that was used by the divers is still in the lake. |

== Other on-site entities ==
=== Lodge on the Lake Hotel ===
In 1998, Premier Parks made a major investment to the property with the park's first on-site hotel, featuring a North Woods theme. The $12 million Lodge on the Lake Hotel opened with 161 hotel rooms, two suites, and an outdoor heated pool. A few months later, the similarly themed Beaver Brothers Cafe opened as a full-service restaurant offering breakfast, lunch, and dinner.

=== Campgrounds ===
The campground and picnic area offers campsites, half of which are equipped with park-owned RVs and cabins. Amenities located within the campgrounds are in an area called Darien Square, which holds a General Store, two restaurants, a gift shop, an arcade, a lounge, laundry services, and the campground offices.

=== Darien Lake Performing Arts Center ===
The Darien Lake Performing Arts Center is an outdoor music venue on the park grounds.

=== Lakeside Amphitheater ===
Concerts were formerly held here, but this amphitheater now houses the park's laser show, Laser Light Night Time Spectacular, and has housed all its previous iterations as well. A pool was added in front of the stage as part of one of the former laser shows.

== Incidents ==
- On July 26, 1987, a lightning strike killed three campers sleeping in tents on the campground.
- On May 16, 1999, a 365 lb (165 kg) guest from Olean, New York who had been unable to properly secure his lap bar was ejected from Ride of Steel as the train went over one of its final airtime hills. He fell approximately 9 feet (2.7 m), sustaining serious injuries. He was awarded US$3.95 million in damages. Seatbelts and an extra brake segment before the final hill were added to the coaster after the incident.
- On September 6, 2009, the body of William Sutherland, a Pennsylvania resident who had been reported missing the day before following a concert at the park, was found in a park lake. His death was unexplained but "[did] not appear to be suspicious."
- On July 8, 2011, James Hackemer, an Iraq War veteran who had lost both legs in a 2008 roadside bomb attack, was ejected from Ride of Steel. The accident was attributed to operator error, as the operators should not have allowed him to ride, because the restraints required passengers to have both legs in order to be restrained safely. Witnesses reported seeing the man let go of the restraint to reach for his hat that had flown off his head before he was ejected, and evidence suggested that he died instantly from blunt force trauma to the head when he came into contact with the front of a ride car. Following this incident, the ride temporarily ceased operation for two weeks before reopening again on July 22.
- On September 30, 2017, several guests on the Silver Bullet ride suffered injuries as the ride came to a stop. The exact cause is unknown, though a park spokesperson said it was not due to a ride malfunction.
- On October 5, 2019, 36-year-old Adam Cassel of Livonia, Michigan, allegedly suffered shoulder and spinal injuries while riding The Predator when his seat's headrest broke during the ride. The victim claimed the headrest was partially broken prior to his boarding the train and that the attendants failed to notice and close off the seat.

== See also ==
- Incidents at Six Flags parks
- List of contemporary amphitheatres
