= Hoot N Holler =

Roller coaster at Six Flags Darien Lake

- Previously known as Ladybug (1981-1988); Nessie the Dreamy Dragon (1988-1997); Brain Teaser (1997-2012).
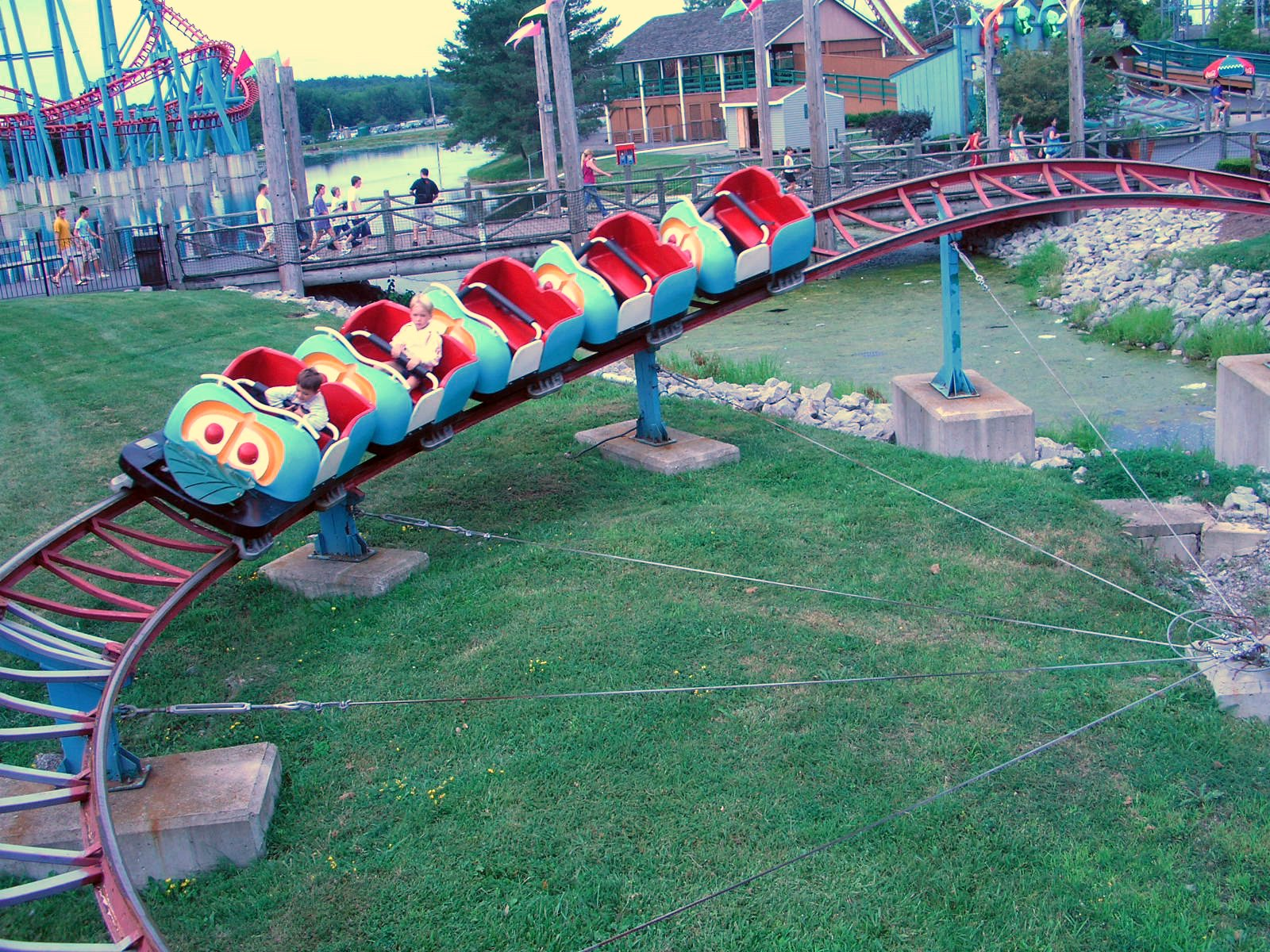
- Hoot N Holler in 2006

Six Flags Darien Lake
- Location: Six Flags Darien Lake
- Park section: Rowdy's Ridge
- Coordinates: 42.927230°N 78.382270°W
- Status: Operating
- Opening date: 1981

General statistics
- Type: Steel
- Manufacturer: Zierer
- Designer: Werner Stengel
- Model: Out and Back roller coaster
- Height: 10.8 ft (3.3 m)
- Length: 197.5 ft (60.2 m)
- Speed: 16.2 mph (26.1 km/h)
- Inversions: 0
- Capacity: 600 riders per hour
- Height restriction: 36 in (91 cm)
- Hoot N Holler at RCDB

Hoot N Holler is a steel kiddie roller coaster located at Six Flags Darien Lake in Darien Center, New York. It was manufactured by Zierer and opened in 1981, the same year as the park itself.

== History ==
Hoot N Holler opened in 1981 as the first roller coaster at the park, then known as Darien Lake Fun Country. The coaster was originally named Ladybug, after its ladybug-shaped train. The coaster was located in the vicinity of the Giant Wheel from 1981 to 1988. It was later moved to Adventure Land for Kids in 1988, where it was renamed Nessie the Dreamy Dragon to fit the dragon theming of that area. Its train was also repainted from its original ladybug design to be green and yellow. In 1997, it was moved again to be closer to the new The Mind Eraser coaster in an area with two other rides, alongside which it would be known as the Tiny Trio: BMX Motocross (which has since been relocated to Elitch Gardens as Trike Bikes) and Dodgems (now known as Raccoon Rally). It was also renamed to Brain Teaser, to match the nearby The Mind Eraser. It was repainted with red track with teal supports to match the color scheme of The Mind Eraser as well.

For the 2012 season, the park rethemed their children's section to "Rowdy's Ridge", which included several new rides (Hornet's Nest, Moose on the Loose, and Rowdy's Heave Ho), and changes to the two pre-existing rides (Brain Teaser became Hoot N Holler and Dodgems became Raccoon Rally). The ride now has a sea green track and supports, and its train has been repainted brown to look like an owl.

== Current operation ==
Hoot N Holler is intended for children between 36 and 54 inches tall. Anyone who is taller than this is not permitted to ride. The coaster features a single five-car train, with one two-person row per car. It can hold a total of ten riders per train. When the ride is used at full capacity, it can take up to 600 riders per hour.

== See also ==
- 2012 in amusement parks
