= Darien Lake Performing Arts Center =

Outdoor music venue in Darien Center, New York

- Interactive map of Darien Lake Performing Arts Center
- Address: 9993 Alleghany Road
- Location: Darien Center, New York, U.S.
- Coordinates: 42°55′36.5″N 78°22′45.6″W
- Owner: EPR Properties
- Operator: Live Nation Entertainment
- Capacity: 21,600

Construction
- Opened: 1993

The Darien Lake Performing Arts Center (PAC) is an outdoor music venue located at Six Flags Darien Lake in Darien Center, New York. It opened in 1993 as a replacement for the Lakeside Amphitheater concert venue. It is operated by Live Nation Entertainment. The amphitheater has a capacity of 21,600, with 6,410 seats under pavilion.

== See also ==
- Live Nation (events promoter)
