= Moto Coaster (Six Flags Darien Lake) =

Motorbike roller coaster at Six Flags Darien Lake in New York

- Previously known as Orange County Choppers MotoCoaster (2008-2009)
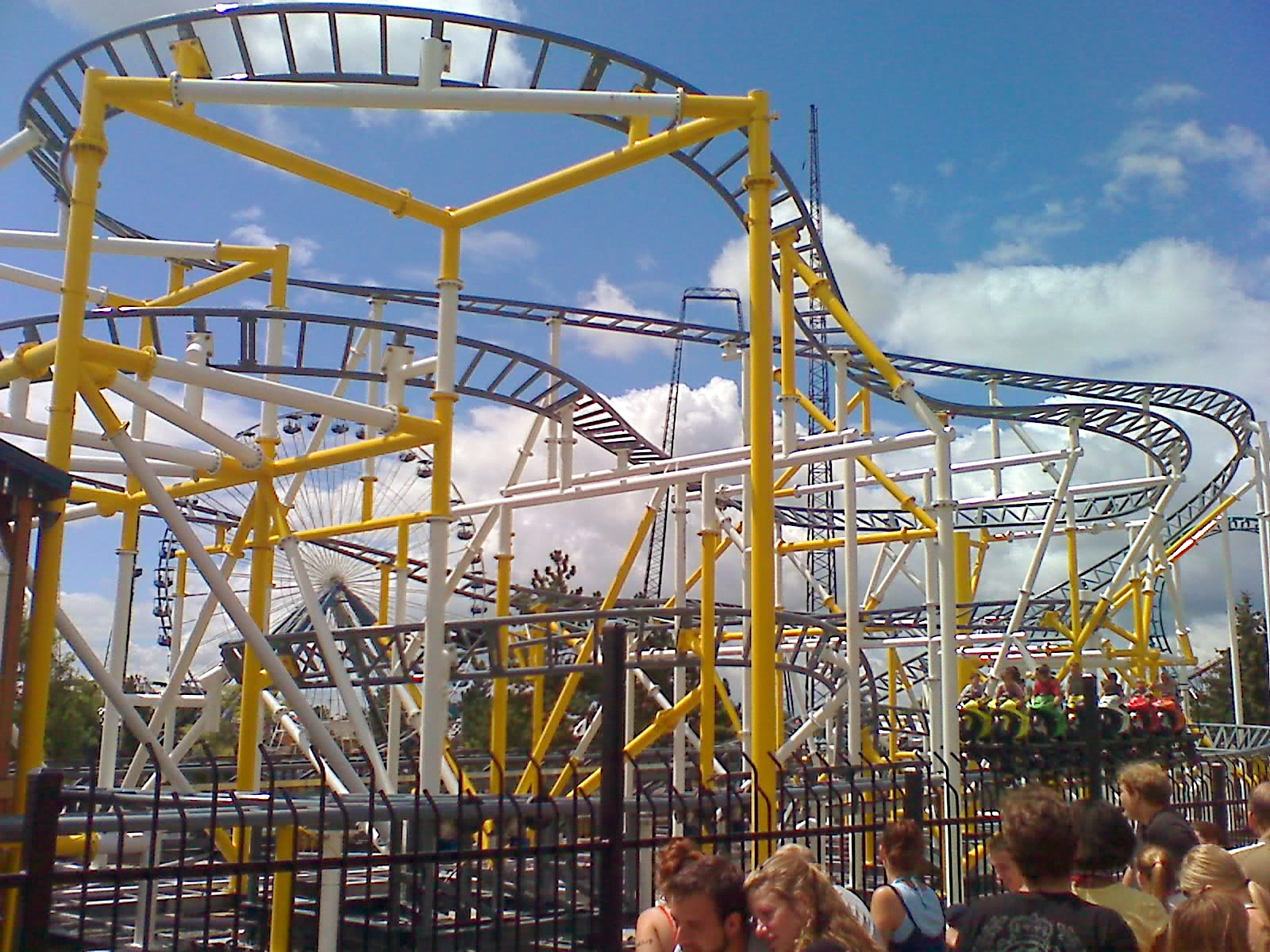

Six Flags Darien Lake
- Location: Six Flags Darien Lake
- Coordinates: 42.930384°N 78.383450°W
- Status: Operating
- Opening date: May 3, 2008
- Cost: $3.4million

General statistics
- Type: Steel – Launched – Motorbike
- Manufacturer: Zamperla
- Designer: Werner Stengel
- Model: Motocoaster
- Track layout: Stacked Figure-8
- Lift/launch system: Flywheel Launch
- Height: 44 ft (13 m)
- Length: 1,198 ft (365 m)
- Speed: 38 mph (61 km/h)
- Inversions: 0
- Capacity: 250 riders per hour
- Acceleration: 0 - 38 mph
- Height restriction: 48 in (122 cm)
- Trains: 6 cars; riders arranged 2 across in a single row for a total of 12 riders per train
- Fast Lane available
- Moto Coaster at RCDB

Moto Coaster is a motorbike roller coaster at Six Flags Darien Lake in Darien, New York. It was the park's first launch coaster, and was the first MotoCoaster built by Zamperla to be installed in the United States.

The coaster was originally named Orange County Choppers Motocoaster when it first opened on May 3, 2008. Six Flags Darien Lake partnered with Orange County Choppers (OCC) for the theme of the coaster, along with a promotional giveaway of a custom painted OCC motorcycle, and a custom built bike to remain at the park. After the naming rights with Orange County Choppers expired, the ride's name was changed to Moto Coaster in 2010.

Moto Coaster was the original prototype coaster that was used for tuning and testing at Zamperla's factory in Italy prior to the model's public availability for purchase.
