= Six Flags Hurricane Harbor (Darien Lake) =

Water park in Darien Center, New York

Coordinates: 42.92851°N 78.38488°W

- Interactive map of Six Flags Hurricane Harbor
- Location: Six Flags Darien Lake, Darien, New York, United States
- Owner: EPR Properties
- Operated by: Six Flags
- Opened: May 1990
- Previous names: Barracuda Bay (1990–2009); Splashtown at Darien Lake (2010-2021)
- Operating season: May through September
- Status: Operating
- Website: Official website

Six Flags Hurricane Harbor Darien Lake is a water park located at Six Flags Darien Lake in Darien Center, New York. It opened in May 1990 as Barracuda Bay, and is included with the price of admission to the amusement park. Both the amusement park and the water park are operated by Six Flags. The park was known as Splashtown at Darien Lake from 2010 to 2021.

== History ==
When the water park first opened as Barracuda Bay, it encompassed areas formerly included in the dry park. In 2010, three years after the park had been sold out of the Six Flags chain, the water park was rebranded to Splashtown at Darien Lake. A separate admission was now required to enter the water park, and a new slide complex and lazy river were installed. The park later reverted to the original policy of one admission price granting access to both the amusement park and the water park.

On August 29, 2019, the park, which had just been purchased once again by Six Flags, announced that Splashtown would be rebranded to Six Flags Hurricane Harbor for the 2020 season onwards, and that the water park would see an expansion. Due to the COVID-19 pandemic, the park did not operate in 2020. It resumed operations in 2021.

== Current attractions ==
Name	Type	Opened	Description	Ref(s)
Big Kahuna	ProSlide Technology (MAMMOTH)	2006	A family water slide that was originally located at Six Flags AstroWorld	
Brain Drain	ProSlide Technology (SkyBox)	2015	Two 70-foot-high drop slides that send riders on a 38-foot-per-second free-fall	
Crocodile Isle	Wave pool	1997	A large wave pool that operates on the former site of Adventure Land for Kids	
Flotation Station	Lazy river	2010	A lazy river south of the Swirl City complex	
Hook's Lagoon	Water playground	1996	Five-story tall children's water playground with slides and a tipping bucket	
RipCurl Racer	ProSlide Technology (Kracken Racer)	2016	A six-lane racing slide that replaced the former water park entrance	
Swirl City Slide Complex	ProSlide Technology	2010	Consists of three slides: Cannon Ball Run (CannonBOWL), Mister Twister (TOPSY-TURVY), and Turbo Twins (PIPEline)	
Tornado	ProSlide Technology (Tornado)	2005	Tube slide that features a large funnel	
Wahoo Wave	ProSlide Technology (TornadoWAVE)	2022	60-foot-tall tube slide that features a 30-foot wave wall	

== Former attractions ==
Name	Type	Opened	Closed	Description
Cascade Canyon	Mat slides	1982	2002	A set of four mat slides, located on the east side of Barracuda Bay. It was located where the Shipwreck Falls shoot-the-chutes ride now stands. This was installed before an official water park was introduced at the park.
'Cuda Falls	Water slides	1994	2014	Four inner tube water slides (two enclosed, two open)
Floodgate Falls	Water slide	1981	2008	Lazy river slide. It last operated in 2008 and has remained standing but not operating ever since. This was installed before an official water park was introduced at the park.
Hydro Force	Mat water slides	1977	1989	The original water slides and the first slides at Darien Lake. Once located over the main lake. These were installed before an official water park was introduced at the park.
Torpedo Rapids	Mat water slides	1990	1998	This replaced Hydro Force and operated through the 1998 season
Lazy Days Lagoon	Mini wave pool	2010	Unknown	A small wave pool connected to Flotation Station
Pipeline Plunge	Water slide	1990	Unknown	An enclosed water slide
Rainbow Mountain	Mat water slides	1981	1994	Four mat slides on the north side of the hill that was incorporated into Barracuda Bay in 1990. Replaced by 'Cuda Falls in 1994.
Riptide Run	Water slide	1990	Unknown	A raft water slide
Tadpole Island	Wading pool	1991	1996	Small children's water playground in an area called Adventure Land for Kids. Replaced by Hook's Lagoon in 1996.

== Gallery ==
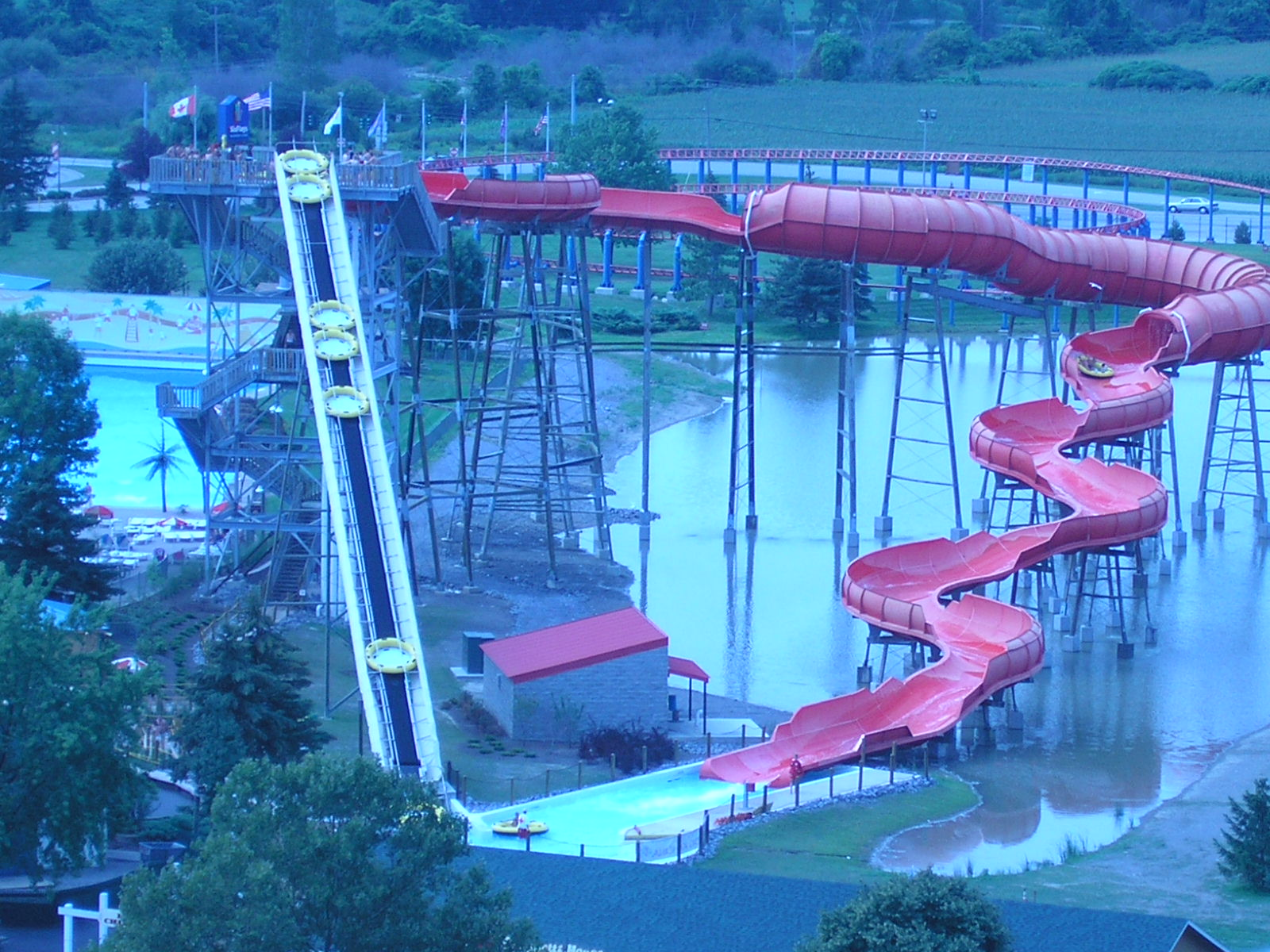
Big Kahuna

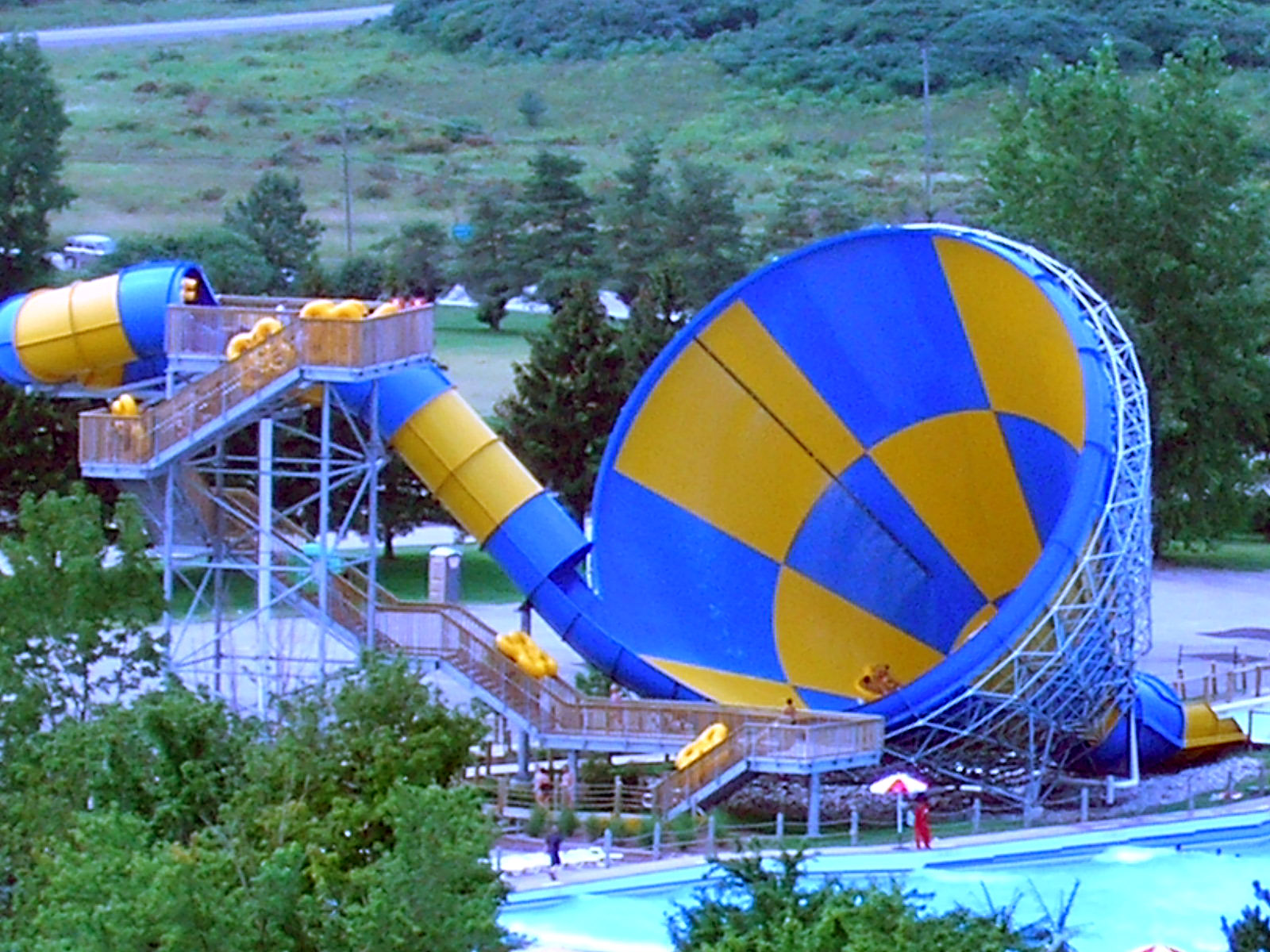
Aerial view of Tornado

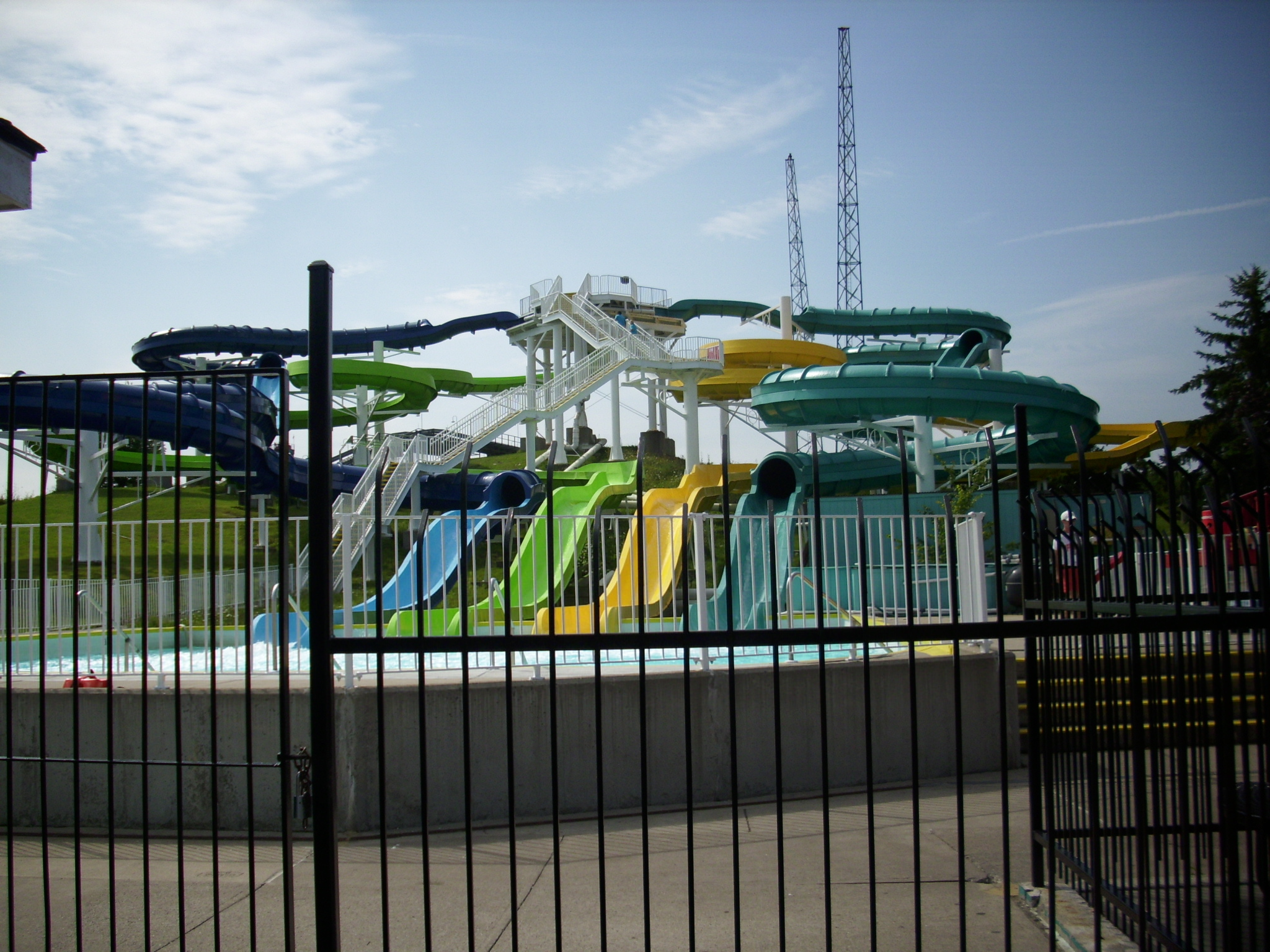
The former 'Cuda Falls
