= Pony Express (roller coaster) =

Roller coaster at Knott's Berry Farm

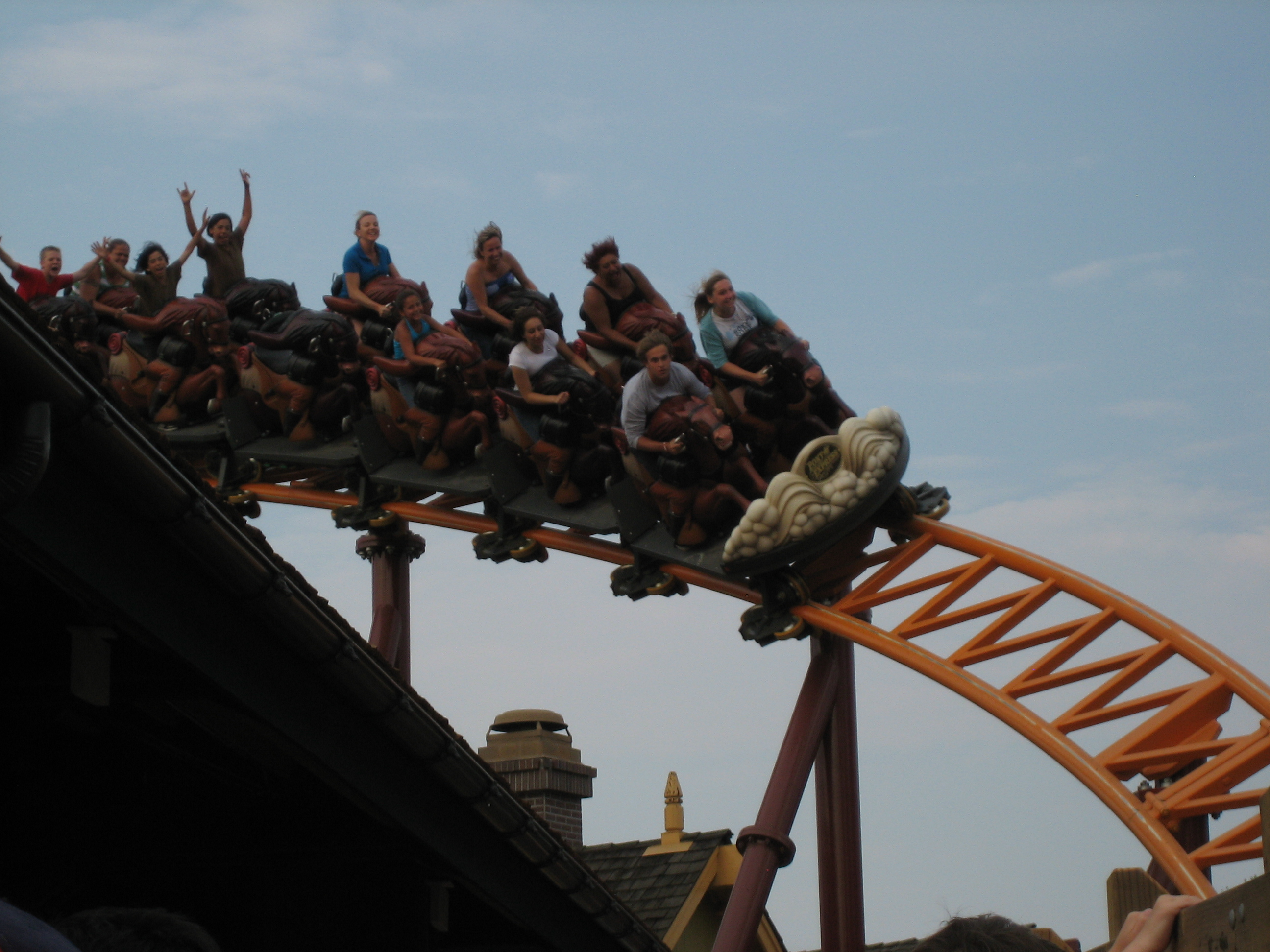

Knott's Berry Farm
- Location: Knott's Berry Farm
- Park section: Ghost Town - Wild Water Wilderness
- Coordinates: 33°50′34.54″N 118°0′4.62″W
- Status: Operating
- Opening date: May 22, 2008
- Replaced: Wilderness Scrambler

General statistics
- Type: Steel – Motorbike – Launched
- Manufacturer: Zamperla
- Model: Moto Coaster
- Height: 44 ft (13 m)
- Length: 1,300 ft (400 m)
- Speed: 38 mph (61 km/h)
- Duration: 0:36
- Capacity: 900 riders per hour
- Acceleration: 0 to 38 mph (0 to 61 km/h) in 3 seconds
- Height restriction: 48 in (122 cm)
- Trains: 2 trains with 8 cars; riders arranged 2 across in a single row for a total of 16 riders per train
- Fast Lane available
- Pony Express at RCDB

Pony Express is a steel motorbike roller coaster at Knott's Berry Farm in Buena Park, California, United States. It was the first Moto Coaster built by Zamperla in the United States, opening on May 22, 2008. The ride features motorbike-style seating and a flywheel launch system.

== Background ==
Pony Express was a $9 million project that was added to the Ghost Town section of the park. The theme of the attraction is based on the historic Pony Express mail service. The attraction is designed to give riders the experience of being part of this delivery system. The ride provides guests with views of Boot Hill and Calico River Rapids, two other attractions in Ghost Town. Knott's Berry Farm has given it a thrill rating of four out of five.

== Design ==
The ride lasts for 36 seconds and is made up of a 1,300-foot-long (400 m) steel track that reaches speeds of up to 38 miles per hour (61 km/h) and heights of up to 44 feet (13 m). Each train has eight rows with two seats in each row, allowing the ride to accommodate up to 900 passengers per hour. Each rider's seat is shaped like a horse, and the rider straddles the saddle seat to create the feeling that they are riding on a horse. An automated restraint system secures the rider in their seat, pressing against his/her lower back, allowing the upper body to move fairly freely.

== Mechanics ==
Pony Express is a Moto Coster model manufactured by Zamperla, a roller coaster and attraction company centered in Vicenza, Italy. Riders straddle the seats like a motorcycle or horse, hence the name Motocoaster. The ride uses a flywheel and clutch system that catches a cable attached to the cars and delivers stored rotational energy, launching riders from 0 to 38 miles per hour (61 km/h) down a straight launch track in less than 3 seconds.

== Incident ==
On October 7, 2010, during the park's annual Knott's Scary Farm event, a train containing nine riders failed to clear the first hill, rolled backwards into the loading station, and collided with another train. The collision injured 10 people – nine riders and one guest preparing to board the stationary train. All 10 were taken to the hospital, but none were reported to have major injuries. The ride reopened a few days later.
