= Goliath (Six Flags New England) =

Defunct steel shuttle roller coaster

- Previously known as Déjà Vu at Six Flags Magic Mountain (2001–2011)
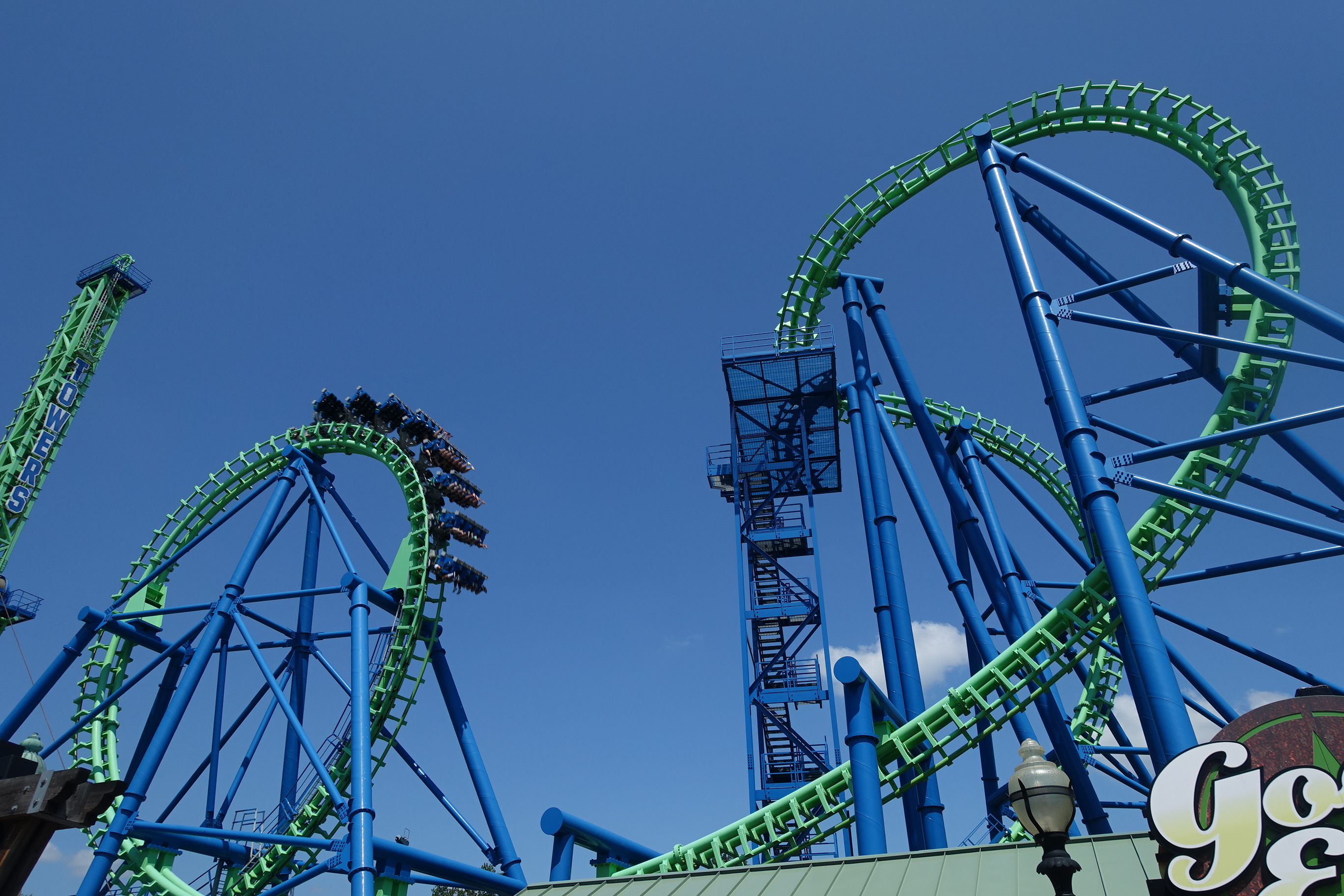
- Goliath at Six Flags New England

Six Flags New England
- Park section: Crackaxle Canyon
- Coordinates: 42.0391°N 72.6145°W
- Status: Removed
- Opening date: May 25, 2012
- Closing date: October 16, 2019
- Replaced: Shipwreck Falls
- Replaced by: Quantum Accelerator

Six Flags Magic Mountain
- Name: Déjà Vu
- Park section: Cyclone Bay
- Coordinates: 34.427°N 118.597°W
- Status: Removed
- Opening date: August 25, 2001
- Closing date: October 16, 2011
- Replaced by: West Coast Racers
- Déjà Vu at Six Flags Magic Mountain at RCDB

General statistics
- Type: Steel – Shuttle – Inverted
- Manufacturer: Vekoma
- Designer: Stefan Holtman
- Model: Giant Inverted Boomerang
- Lift/launch system: Cable lift hill
- Height: 191.6 ft (58.4 m)
- Drop: 177 ft (54 m)
- Length: 1,204.1 ft (367.0 m)
- Speed: 65.6 mph (105.6 km/h)
- Inversions: 3
- Duration: 1:32
- Max vertical angle: 90°
- Capacity: 870 riders per hour
- G-force: 4.5
- Height restriction: 54–75 in (137–191 cm)
- Trains: Single train with 8 cars; riders arranged 4 across in a single row for a total of 32 riders per train
- Goliath at RCDB

Goliath was a steel shuttle roller coaster located at Six Flags New England in Agawam, Massachusetts. Manufactured by Vekoma, the ride originally opened as Déjà Vu at Six Flags Magic Mountain in 2001. The ride was a larger, inverted version of Vekoma's popular Boomerang sit-down roller coasters. In 2021, the park removed the ride from its map indicating it would not reopen for the remainder of the season. In late 2021, demolition of the coaster began.

== History ==
=== Six Flags Magic Mountain ===
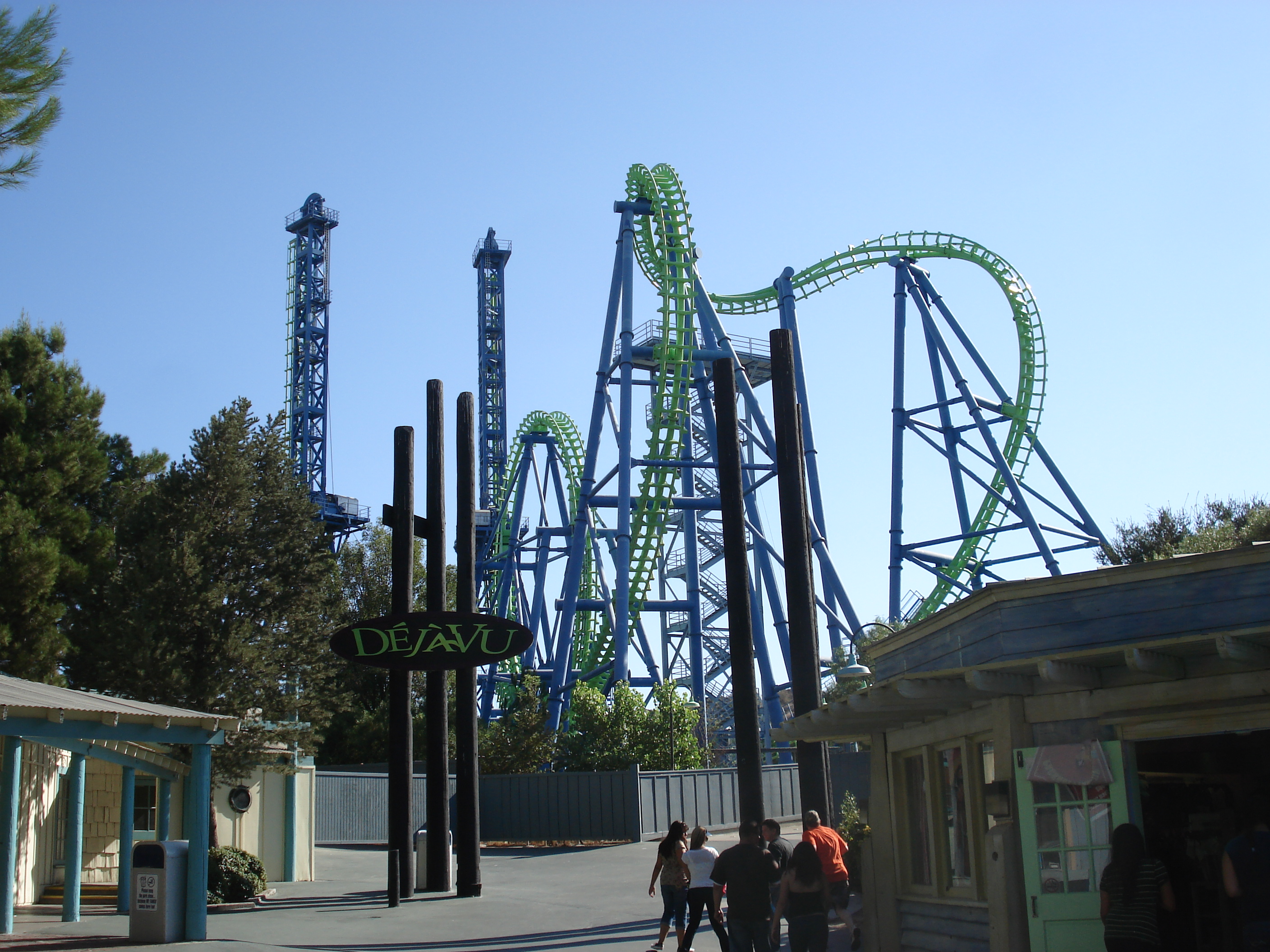
Déjà Vu at Six Flags Magic Mountain

Three Giant Inverted Boomerang roller coasters, all named Déjà Vu, were slated to open for the start of the 2001 season at three Six Flags amusement parks. Errors and malfunctions that occurred during testing caused the openings to be delayed. The ride first opened at Six Flags Magic Mountain on August 25, 2001. The installations at Six Flags Over Georgia and Six Flags Great America opened on September 1 and October 7 of the same year, respectively.

=== Six Flags New England ===
On August 16, 2011, Masslive reported that Six Flags New England was planning on building a Giant Inverted Boomerang for the park's 2012 season where the Shipwreck Falls attraction was located. On August 18, 2011, the ride was approved by the Agawam Planning Board, with the Los Angeles Times confirming a day later that Déjà Vu from Six Flags Magic Mountain would be relocated to Six Flags New England in 2012 and given a new name. An official announcement from Six Flags followed on September 1, 2011, confirming the relocation and announcing that Déjà Vu would be renamed Goliath. Déjà Vu's last day of operation was October 16, 2011. Shipwreck Falls was removed from Six Flags New England around the same time to make way for Goliath. Goliath opened to the public on May 25, 2012.

In 2021, Six Flags New England removed Goliath from the park map, and a park representative confirmed it would not operate for the remainder of the season. The coaster began demolition in late 2021 confirming its permanent closure. The ride was completely demolished before the 2022 season started.

== Ride experience ==
Rendering of new Premier Rides Train for Goliath

=== Layout and design ===
Goliath featured a vertical cable lift hill that lifted the train up a vertical tower. The Giant Inverted Boomerang model is larger than previous designs from Vekoma, such as their Invertigo model released several years earlier.

=== Train ===
Goliath featured a train by Premier Rides, which was unlike the other Giant Inverted Boomerang installations. It featured a seating layout of four riders per row directly in line with one another, identical to the layout used on inverted coasters from Bolliger & Mabillard. It was chosen to make the boarding in the station less confusing and complicated, while also increasing rider capacity. However, this train caused the ride experience to become rougher.

== Incidents ==
On July 11, 2016, a cable on tower one snapped on Goliath, causing an extended closure.
