= The Predator (roller coaster) =

Wooden roller coaster at Six Flags Darien Lake

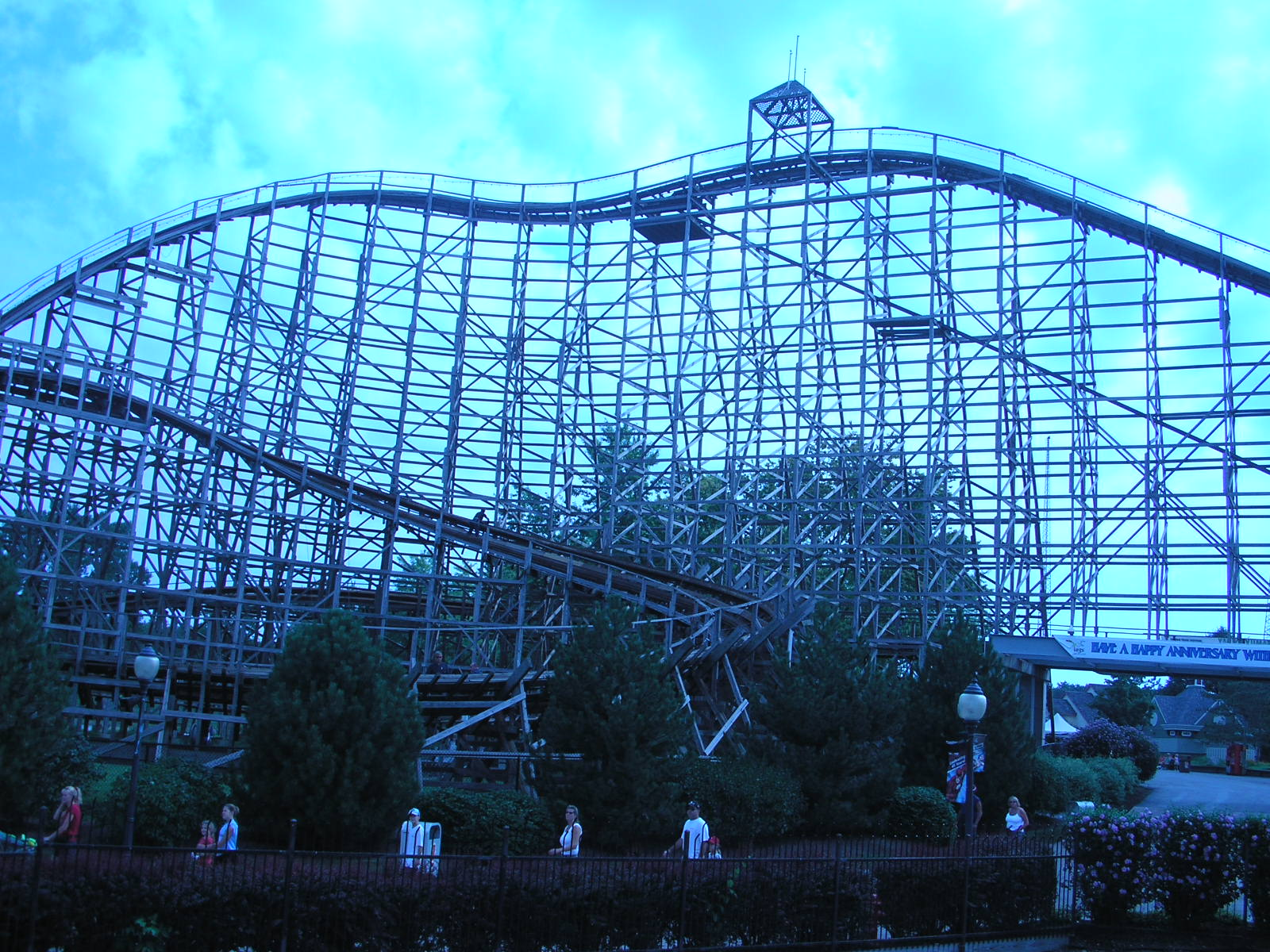
- The Predator's lift hill

Six Flags Darien Lake
- Location: Six Flags Darien Lake
- Coordinates: 42°55′45″N 78°23′10″W
- Status: Operating
- Opening date: May 25, 1990
- Cost: $2.5 million

General statistics
- Type: Wood – Out and back
- Manufacturer: Dinn Corporation
- Designer: Curtis D. Summers
- Height: 95 ft (29 m)
- Length: 3,400 ft (1,000 m)
- Speed: 50 mph (80 km/h)
- Inversions: 0
- Duration: 1:50
- Capacity: 1300 riders per hour
- Height restriction: 48 in (122 cm)
- Trains: 2 trains with 6 cars; riders arranged 2 across in 2 rows for a total of 24 riders per train
- Fast Lane available
- The Predator at RCDB

The Predator is a hybrid wooden roller coaster located at Six Flags Darien Lake. It was designed by Curtis D. Summers and built by Dinn Corporation and opened on May 25, 1990.

== Renovations and upgrades ==
In 2001, part of the queue line was removed to make way for an expanded seating area for a nearby food stand. At the end of the summer of 2006, a major re-tracking took place and some wood was replaced on the ride to help make it more enjoyable for guests.

In 2010, Six Flags Darien Lake purchased 12 Philadelphia Toboggan Coasters (PTC) articulated cars from Holiday World, where they had been previously used on The Voyage. These trains replaced the original trailered PTC trains, which were known to provide an extremely rough ride experience. The Predator was the last roller coaster to operate with trailered PTC trains.

In 2020, it was revealed that Great Coasters International would be replacing large sections of The Predator's track with their steel Titan Track. In 2022, Predator received its first section of Titan Track, approximately 250 feet (76.2 m). It received 200 feet (61 m) more in 2023, over 360 feet (110 m) in 2024, nearly 370 feet (113 m) in 2025, and 500 feet (152.4 m) in 2026.
