= Wave Breaker: The Rescue Coaster =

Roller coaster at SeaWorld San Antonio

SeaWorld San Antonio
- Location: SeaWorld San Antonio
- Coordinates: 29.4553°N 98.6961°W
- Status: Operating
- Soft opening date: June 10, 2017
- Opening date: June 16, 2017
- Cost: $18,000,000

General statistics
- Type: Steel – Launched – Motorbike
- Manufacturer: Intamin
- Designer: SeaWorld Parks & Entertainment
- Model: Family Launch Coaster
- Track layout: Out and Back
- Lift/launch system: Tire launch
- Height: 61 ft (19 m)
- Length: 2,600 ft (790 m)
- Speed: 44 mph (71 km/h)
- Inversions: 0
- Capacity: 886 riders per hour
- Height restriction: 48 in (122 cm)
- Trains: 3 trains with 8 cars; riders arranged 2 across in a single row for a total of 16 riders per train
- Quick Queue available
- Wave Breaker: The Rescue Coaster at RCDB

Wave Breaker: The Rescue Coaster is a double launch roller coaster at SeaWorld San Antonio amusement park in San Antonio, Texas. The roller coaster is designed to emphasize SeaWorld's animal rescue efforts. Opened in 2017, it is the first jet ski roller coaster in North America and would incorporate cars designed as jet skis used by SeaWorld's rescue team. Most of the track was built over the park's lake.

== Construction ==
The park's lake was partially drained and inflatable rubber dams were put in the lake to allow the construction site to be drained, but not the rest of the lake. The park closes annually from January to late February and during this time SeaWorld re-themed the area near the coaster's entrance queue. SeaWorld San Antonio regularly posted construction update videos on their YouTube channel. The roller coaster was officially opened on June 16, 2017.

== Ride experience ==
Once riders are seated and restrained, the train exits the loading station and enters a video orientation tunnel. Once the orientation is over, the train is launched up a camelback hump. The train then glides across the surface of the park's lake simulating a jet ski ride. Halfway through the ride, the train is launched one more time up the tallest point of the coaster (61 feet) and crosses the only section of the track that is on land (a small artificial island in the lake). After a few more seconds, the train returns to the station. The attraction (queue and launch) also features an original 30 minute electric/orchestral hybrid score by composer Rick McKee.

== Characteristics ==
=== Statistics ===
It stands 61 feet (19 m) tall with a top speed of 44 miles per hour (71 km/h). 300 concrete pillars hold the coaster's track. The track is 2600 feet in length.

=== Trains ===
It operates with up to three trains. Each train will seat 16 riders in eight rows of two. The ride theoretically can serve 886 riders per hour. Riders are restrained with lap restraints. Along with the theme, the trains resemble jet skis.

=== Theme ===
It is themed after SeaWorld's animal rescue team. Most of the coaster is just above the surface of the park's lake to make guests feel as if they are on a mission to rescue an animal.

== Reception ==
Wave Breaker: The Rescue Coaster was ranked in the Amusement Today's Golden Ticket Awards for best new ride of 2017 with 6% of the vote, to come in fifth place.

Golden Ticket Awards: Best New Ride for 2017
Ranking	5
