= Boomerang: Coast to Coaster =

Roller coaster at several amusement parks

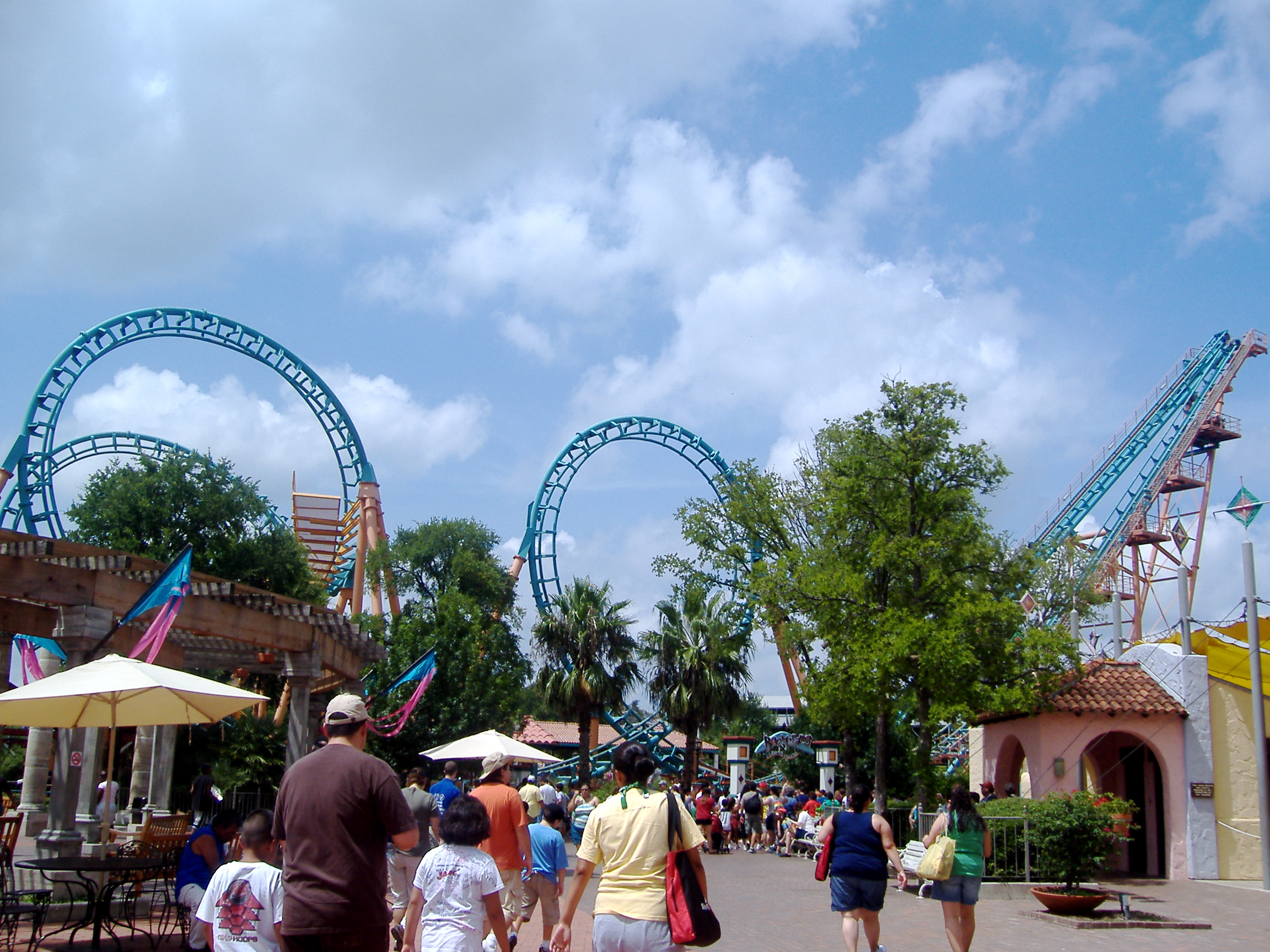
- Boomerang: Coast to Coaster at Six Flags Fiesta Texas

General statistics
- Type: Steel – Shuttle – Boomerang
- Manufacturer: Vekoma
- Designer: Vekoma
- Model: Boomerang
- Lift/launch system: Chain lift hill
- Height: 116.5 ft (35.5 m)
- Length: 935 ft (285 m)
- Speed: 47 mph (76 km/h)
- Inversions: 3
- Duration: 1:48
- Max vertical angle: 65°
- Capacity: 760 riders per hour
- G-force: 5.2
- Height restriction: 48 in (122 cm)
- Fast Lane available at Six Flags Discovery Kingdom, Six Flags Darien Lake and Six Flags Fiesta Texas

Boomerang: Coast to Coaster is a name shared by multiple steel shuttle roller coasters located at several amusement parks in the United States. The roller coasters were designed and manufactured by Vekoma, and are one of the company's Boomerang models. At the time of their installations in the late 1990s, each ride was located in a park owned by Six Flags. All five coasters were originally known as Boomerang: Coast to Coaster, although two have since been renamed.

== Design and operation ==
Originally, all of these coasters featured teal track and white supports. As of 2026, Six Flags Darien Lake's model is the only of the five installations to maintain its original colors since its opening year. Six Flags Discovery Kingdom's model has teal track and yellow supports; Elitch Gardens' model has yellow track and purple supports; and Six Flags Fiesta Texas' model has teal track and orange supports. Great Escape's model featured yellow track and red supports for a time, but it was repainted to its debut year colors for the 2025 season.

Each ride is the standard Vekoma Boomerang roller coaster model found operating at 52 different amusement parks worldwide.

Each coaster has one train with a capacity of 28 riders per train, two across in each row with sit-down style seating. To begin a ride cycle, the train is pulled backwards up the first lift hill, then dropped through the station into a cobra roll and a loop. Coming out of the loop, the train is pulled up another lift hill at the end of the track, then dropped once again, allowing it to traverse these inversions backwards, hence the name "Boomerang".

== Installations ==
Locations for Boomerang: Coast to Coaster
| Name | Park | Area | Opened | Status | Reference |
|---|---|---|---|---|---|
| Flashback | Great Escape | Hot Rod USA | May 23, 1997 | Operating | |
| Boomerang: Coast to Coaster | Six Flags Discovery Kingdom | Sky | March 27, 1998 | Operating | |
| Boomerang: Coast to Coaster | Six Flags Darien Lake | | May 16, 1998 | Operating | |
| Boomerang: Coast to Coaster | Six Flags Fiesta Texas | Los Festivales | March 13, 1999 | Operating | |
| Boomerang | Elitch Gardens Theme Park | | April 30, 1999 | Operating | |

== Gallery ==
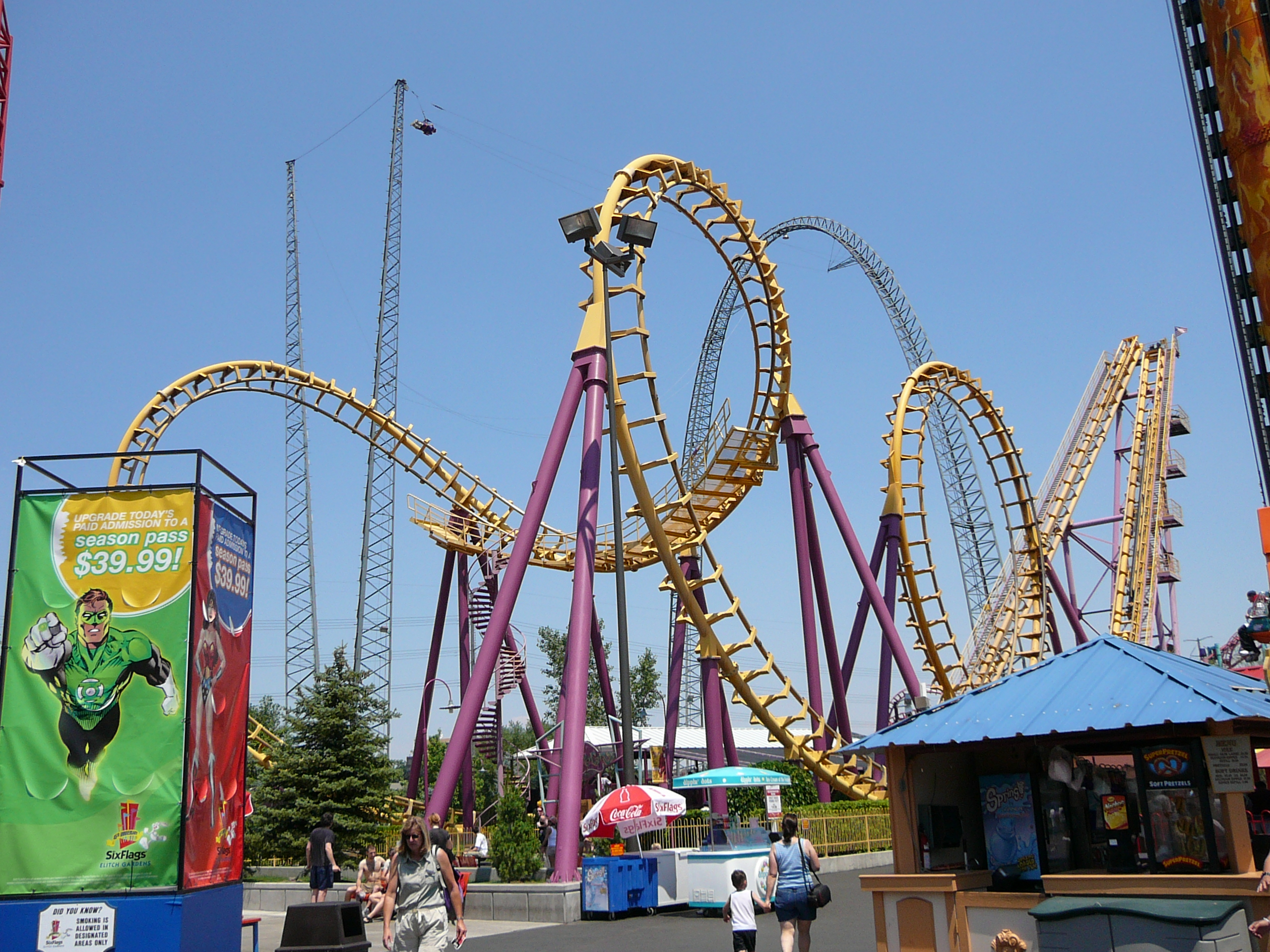
Boomerang at Elitch Gardens

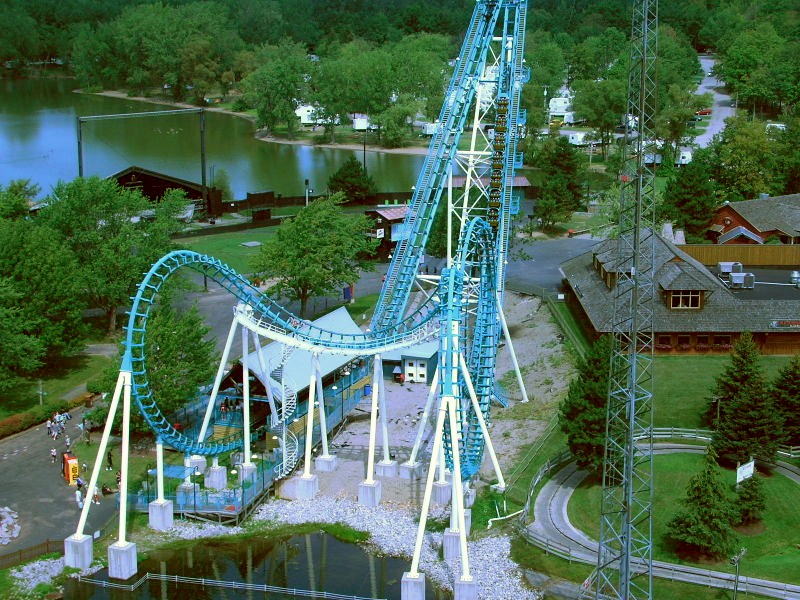
Boomerang: Coast to Coaster at Six Flags Darien Lake

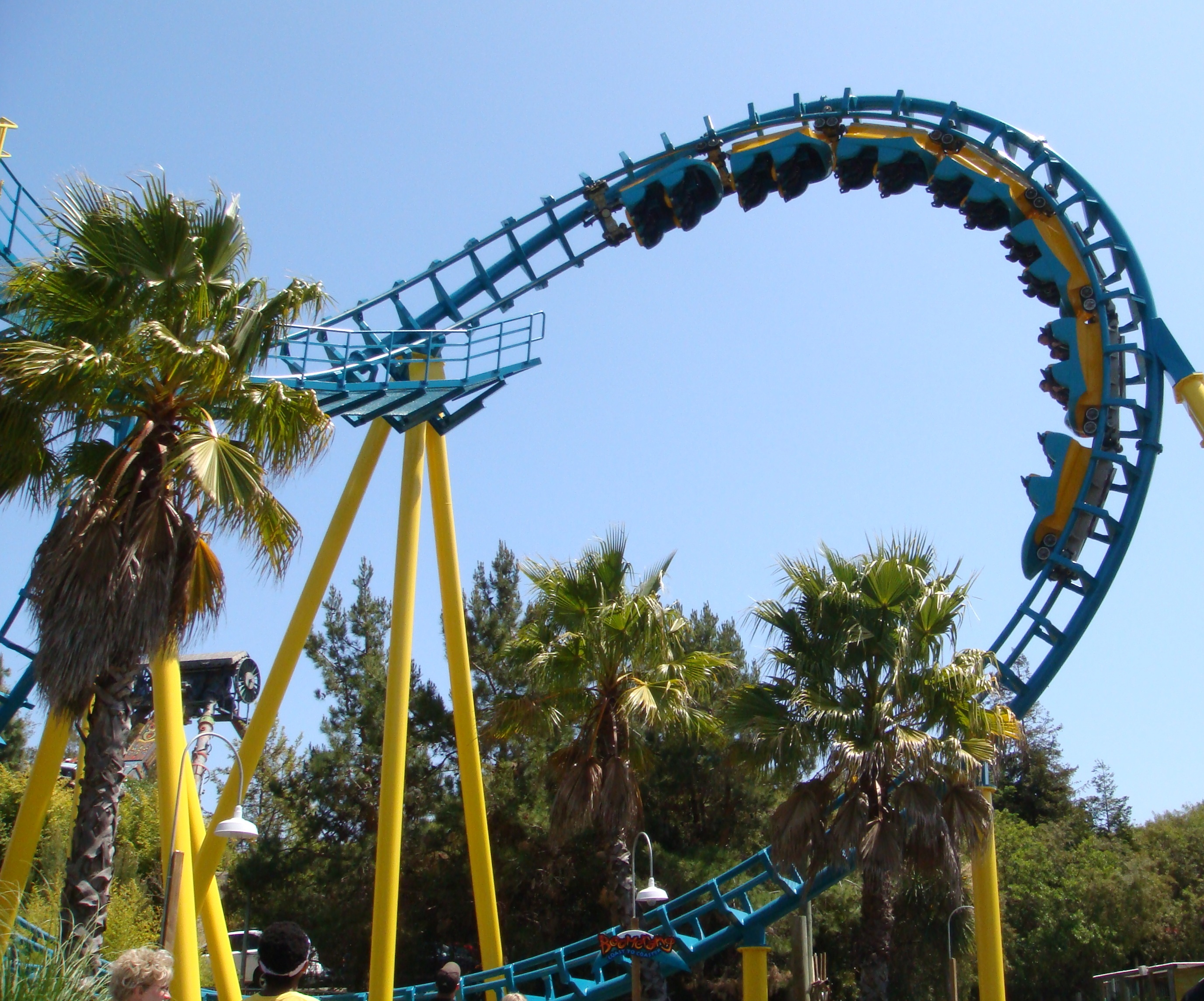
Boomerang: Coast to Coaster at Six Flags Discovery Kingdom

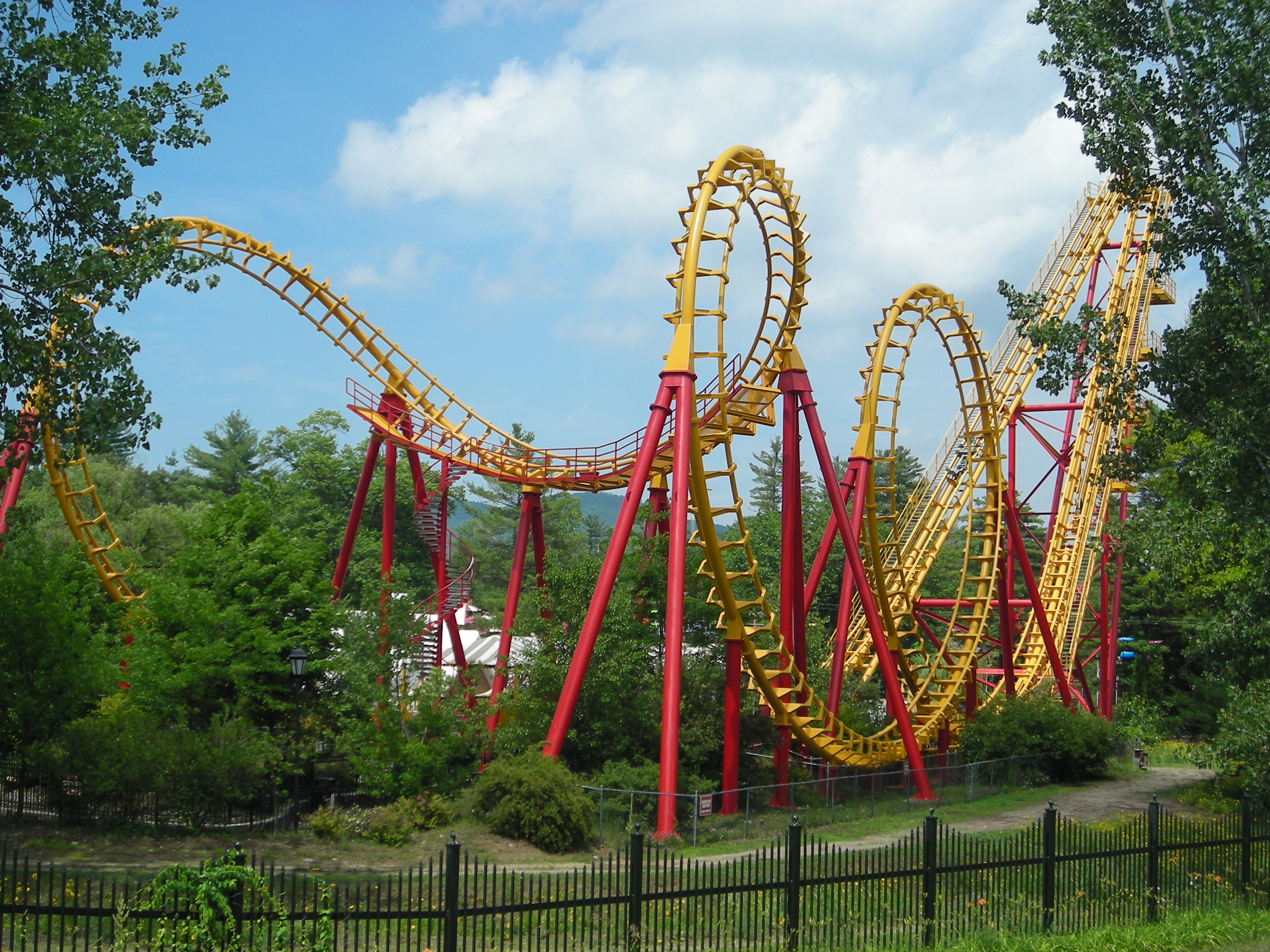
Flashback at Great Escape

== See also ==
- Boomerang (roller coaster)
