= Motorbike roller coaster =

Type of steel roller coaster

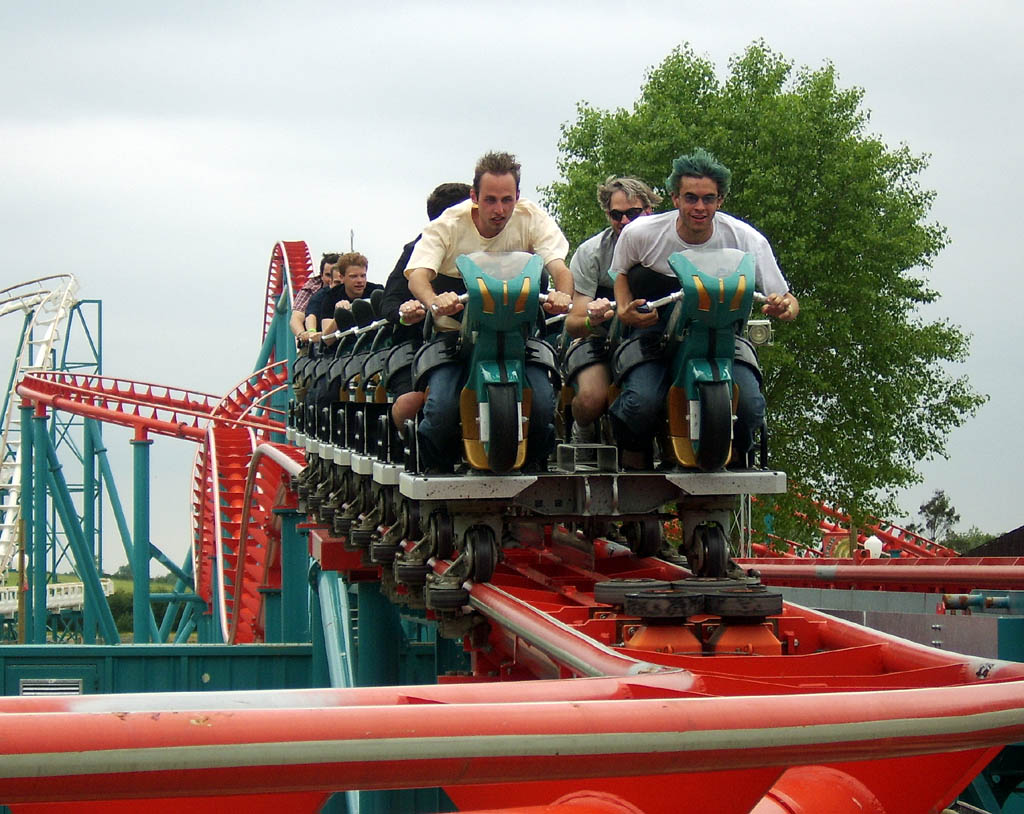
- Velocity at Flamingo Land, a Vekoma Motorbike roller coaster
- Status: In production
- First manufactured: 2004
- No. of installations: 16
- Manufacturers: Vekoma, Maurer Intamin and Zamperla
- Type: Steel motorbike roller coaster
- Motorbike roller coaster at RCDB

A motorbike roller coaster or motorcycle roller coaster is a type of steel roller coaster designed with motorcycle type cars. Booster Bike at Toverland was the world's first motorbike roller coaster. Vekoma was the first company to design such a ride, although Intamin and Zamperla have since created similar designs.

A similar but unrelated Steeplechase roller coaster was Knott's Berry Farm's Motorcycle Chase by Arrow Dynamics which opened in 1976. That attraction featured single motorbike themed vehicles racing side-by-side, each on one of four parallel tracks, launched together. It was retrofitted in 1980 as Wacky Soap Box Racers before being removed in 1996.

== Design ==
=== Vekoma ===
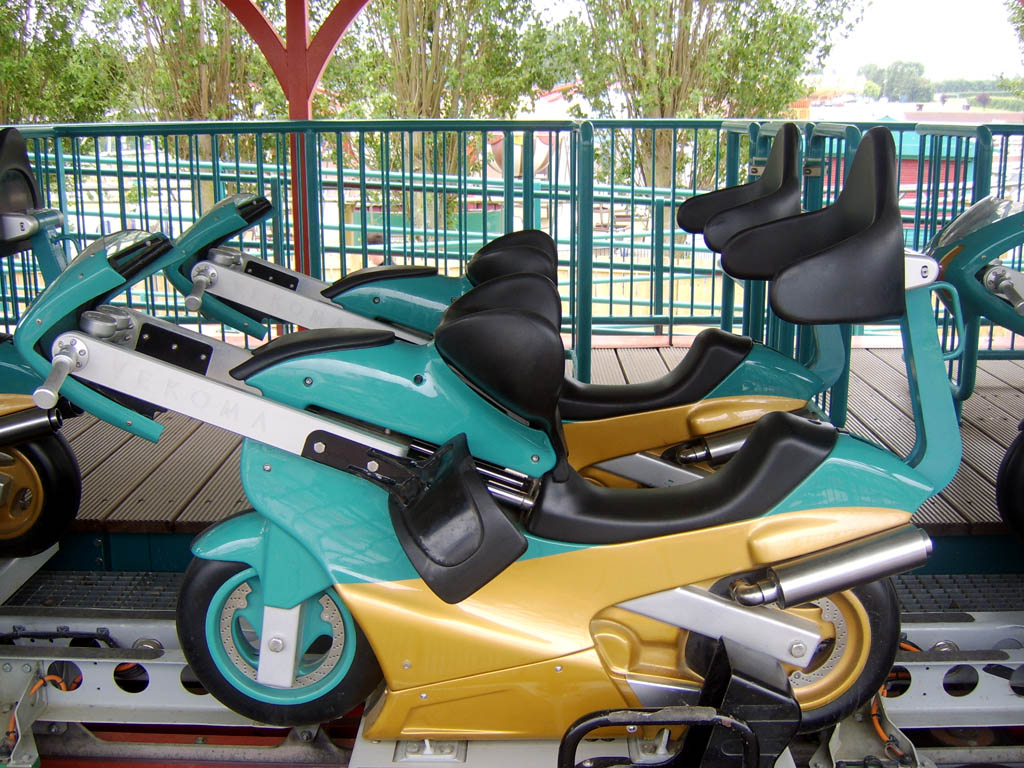
Motorbike coaster ride vehicle

The Vekoma Motorbike Coaster consists of a train with nine cars, each consisting of two motorcycle seats. Each seat was designed to replicate the seating on a motorcycle, and allows free upper body movement.

After dispatching from the station, the train is hydraulically launched into a twisting layout. The first Motorbike coaster was the Booster Bike at Toverland in The Netherlands, opened in 2004. A second, Velocity opened at Flamingo Land Theme Park and Zoo in the United Kingdom. A third, identical to the Booster Bike, opened at Chimelong Paradise in China.

The Vekoma Motorbike Coaster concept was first demonstrated with the use of the No Limits roller coaster simulator, and is included as a track style in the commercial version.

=== Intamin ===
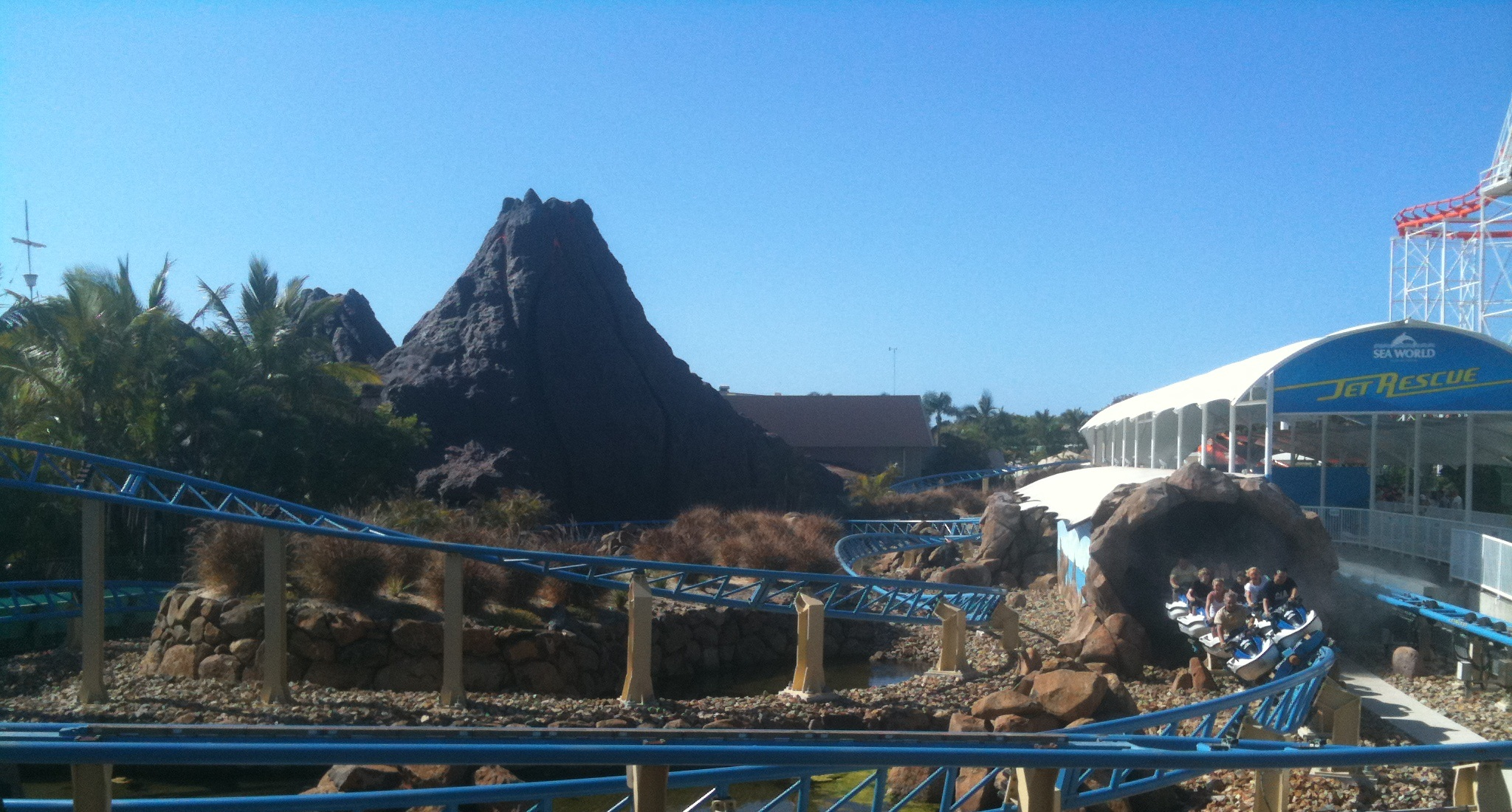
Jet Rescue at Sea World is an Intamin motorbike roller coaster with jet ski cars.

Intamin was the second company to come up with a motorbike roller coaster design. Their design utilizes drive tires to launch its trains. Currently, only four installations exist - two in Australia, one in Denmark, and one in the United States.

=== Maurer Rides ===
Maurer Rides offers a motorbike coaster concept known as the Spike Coaster. This innovative design features individual motorbike-style vehicles that allow riders to control their speed, simulating a real racing experience. Unlike traditional roller coasters, the Spike Racing Coaster uses a linear synchronous motor (LSM) system, enabling dynamic acceleration and deceleration throughout the ride.

The coaster’s track layout is highly customizable, often incorporating sharp turns, steep drops, and airtime hills to enhance the racing feel. Each motorbike seat is designed for ergonomic comfort, with handlebars and a forward-leaning position to mimic riding a real motorcycle.

=== Zamperla ===
The Zamperla Motocoaster consists of a train of six cars instead of nine, but they are set up similarly, two seats side by side per car.

Zamperla's coaster uses a flywheel launch instead of a hydraulic launch system. The standard track layout is a 3-layered figure 8.

In 2008 2 MotoCoasters were installed in the United States. The prototype is at Darien Lake near Buffalo, New York.

The Pony Express at Knott's Berry Farm, Buena Park, California, in a twist on the once famous Motorcycle Chase of Indian Motorcycles on a Steeplechase roller coaster, now sports a Zamperla Motocoaster styled as horses.

== Installations ==
Name	Location	Manufacturer	Trains	Opened
Desmo Race	Mirabilandia	Maurer Rides	Motorbikes	2019
Sea Stallion	Six Flags Qiddiya City	Maurer Rides		2025
Sky Dragster	Skyline Park	Maurer Rides	Motorbikes	2017
Bolt	Carnival Cruise Line - Mardi Gras	Maurer Rides	Motorbikes	2019
Bolt	Carnival Cruise Line - Celebration	Maurer Rides	Motorbikes	2021
Bolt	Carnival Cruise Line - Jubilee	Maurer Rides	Motorbikes	2023
Booster Bike	Toverland	Vekoma	Motorbikes	2004
Velocity	Flamingo Land	Vekoma	Motorbikes	2005
Motorbike Launch Coaster	Chimelong Paradise	Vekoma	Motorbikes	2006
Motocoaster	Dreamworld	Intamin	Motorbikes	2007
Jet Rescue	Sea World (Australia)	Intamin	Jet Skis	2008
Moto Coaster	Six Flags Darien Lake	Zamperla	Motorbikes	2008
Pony Express	Knott's Berry Farm	Zamperla	Horses	2008
Moto Coaster	Jinjiang Action Park	Zamperla	Motorbikes	2009
Moto Bala	Mundo Petapa	Zamperla	Motorbikes	2010
MotoGee	Särkänniemi Amusement Park	Zamperla	Motorbikes	2010
Dinosaur Mountain	China Dinosaurs Park	Zamperla	Pterodactyls	2010
Steeplechase	Scream Zone Coney Island	Zamperla	Horses	2011
Juvelen	Djurs Sommerland	Intamin	All-terrain vehicles	2013
Rocket Cycles	Adventureland	Zamperla	Motorbikes	2014
Storm Rider	Xishuangbanna Sunac Land	Zamperla	Horses	2015
Tron Lightcycle Power Run	Shanghai Disneyland	Vekoma	Light cycles	2016
Wave Breaker: The Rescue Coaster	SeaWorld San Antonio	Intamin	Jet Skis	2017
Drydock Express	Wanda Theme Park	Zamperla	Horses	2018
Paradise Fall	Sun World Danang Wonders	Intamin	All-terrain vehicles	2018
Pioneer	OK Corral	Zierer	Horses	2018
Yukon Quad	Le Pal	Intamin	All-terrain vehicles	2018
Canavar Dalga	Wonderland Eurasia	Intamin	Jet Skis	2019
Hagrid's Magical Creatures Motorbike Adventure	Universal Islands of Adventure	Intamin	Motorbikes	2019
Namazu	Vulcania	Intamin	All-terrain vehicles	2021
TRON Lightcycle / Run	Magic Kingdom	Vekoma	Light cycles	2023
DarKoaster: Escape The Storm	Busch Gardens Williamsburg	Intamin	Snow Mobiles	2023
Arctic Rescue	Sea World San Diego	Intamin	Snow Mobiles	2023
Quantum Accelerator	Six Flags New England	Intamin		2026
