= Quantum Accelerator (roller coaster) =

Straddle roller coaster at Six Flags New England

Six Flags New England
- Location: Six Flags New England
- Park section: Crackaxle Canyon
- Coordinates: 42.0391°N 72.6145°W
- Status: Operating
- Soft opening date: April 11, 2026
- Opening date: April 17, 2026
- Replaced: Goliath

General statistics
- Type: Steel – Launched – Motorbike
- Manufacturer: Intamin
- Model: Family Launch Coaster
- Lift/launch system: Drive Tire Launch System
- Height: 59 ft (18 m)
- Length: 2,604 ft (794 m)
- Speed: 45 mph (72 km/h)
- Inversions: 0
- Duration: 2:14
- Capacity: 850 riders per hour
- Height restriction: 48 in (122 cm)
- Trains: 2 trains with 8 cars; riders arranged 2 across in a single row for a total of 16 riders per train
- Website: Official site
- Quantum Accelerator at RCDB

Quantum Accelerator is a steel family roller coaster located at Six Flags New England in Agawam, Massachusetts. Manufactured by Intamin, the Straddle coaster model features two launches, a top speed of 45 miles per hour (72 km/h), and 11 airtime moments. Following a year-long delay, the ride opened on April 17, 2026. It replaced Goliath, which was removed from the park at the end of the 2021 season.

== History ==
Six Flags New England officially announced Quantum Accelerator on August 15, 2024. It is billed as New England's first double-launch straddle coaster.

The coaster sits on the site of the former Goliath roller coaster. which was closed in 2019, and demolished prior to the 2022 season.

Quantum Accelerator had an original opening date of June 20, 2025. After missing that date, the park announced that the ride was delayed on July 1, 2025, with its opening slated for the 2026 season.

On March 26, 2026, Six Flags New England announced that the ride was now planned for an official opening of April 17, 2026, with a preview date for season passholders on April 11, 2026.
