= Darien Center, New York =

- Hamlet
- Location within New York Location within the United States
- Coordinates: 42°54′04″N 78°23′19″W
- Country: United States
- State: New York
- County: Genesee
- Elevation: 1,017 ft (310 m)
- Time zone: UTC-5 (Eastern (EST))
  - Summer (DST): UTC-4 (EDT)
- ZIP code: 14040
- Area code: 585
- GNIS feature ID: 948029

Darien Center is a hamlet in Genesee County, New York, United States. The community is located at the intersection of U.S. Route 20 and New York State Route 77, 5.2 miles (8.4 km) east of Alden. Darien Center has a post office with ZIP code 14040, which opened on November 17, 1819.
