= 2009 in amusement parks =

This is a list of events and openings related to amusement parks that occurred in 2009. These various lists are not exhaustive.

== Amusement Parks ==
=== Opening ===
- China Happy Valley Chengdu – January 17
- China Happy Valley Shanghai – August 16
- Indonesia Trans Studio Makassar – September 9

=== Birthday ===
- PowerPark – 10th Anniversary
- Thorpe Park – 30th Anniversary
- Busch Gardens Tampa – 50th Anniversary
- Gulliver's Land – 10th Anniversary
- Walibi Rhône-Alpes – 30th Anniversary
- Legoland California – 10th Anniversary
- Adventure City – 15th Anniversary
- Universal's Islands of Adventure – 10th Anniversary

=== Closed ===
- Cypress Gardens - September 23
- Freestyle Music Park
- Kiddieland Amusement Park - September 27
- Dreamland
- Tama Tech - September 30

== Additions ==
=== Roller Coasters ===
==== New ====
Name	Park	Type	Manufacturer	Opened	Ref(s)
Anubis: The Ride	Plopsaland	Launched roller coaster	Gerstlauer	April 5	
Terminator Salvation: The Ride	Six Flags Magic Mountain	Wooden roller coaster	Great Coasters International	May 23	
blue fire Megacoaster	Europa Park	Launched roller coaster	Mack Rides	April 4	
Correcaminos Bip, Bip	Parque Warner Madrid	Family roller coaster	Mack Rides	May 16	
Diamondback	Kings Island	Steel roller coaster	Bolliger & Mabillard	April 18	
Diving Coaster	Happy Valley Shanghai	Dive Coaster	Bolliger & Mabillard	August 16	
Dragon in Clouds	Happy Valley Chengdu	Inverted roller coaster	Vekoma	January 16	
Dragon in Snowfield	Happy Valley Chengdu	Mine Train roller coaster	Vekoma	January 17	
Spin Gear	SEGA Republic	Spinning roller coaster	Gerstlauer	2009	
El Toro	Freizeitpark Plohn	Wooden roller coaster	Great Coasters International	April 10	
Falcon	Duinrell	Euro-Fighter	Gerstlauer	May 14	
Fluch von Novgorod	Hansa Park	Launched Euro-Fighter	Gerstlauer	April 9	
Fly Over Mediterranean	Happy Valley Chengdu	Steel roller coaster	Intamin	January 17	
Grover's Alpine Express	Busch Gardens Williamsburg	Family roller coaster	Zierer	April 3	
Hollywood Rip, Ride, Rockit	Universal Studios Florida	Steel roller coaster	Maurer Rides	2009	
Insane	Gröna Lund	Steel roller coaster	Intamin	April 25	
iSpeed	Mirabilandia	Launched roller coaster	Intamin	May 20	
Kozmo's Kurves	Knoebels Amusement Resort	Family roller coaster	E&F Miler Industries	August 1	
Magic Carpet	Happy Valley Chengdu	Wild Mouse roller coaster	Golden Horse	January 17	
Manta	SeaWorld Orlando	Flying roller coaster	Bolliger & Mabillard	May 22	
Mega-Lite	Happy Valley Shanghai	Steel roller coaster	Intamin	August 16	
Mine Train Coaster	Happy Valley Shanghai	Family roller coaster	Intamin	October 2009	
Montaña Rusa	Parque Bicentenario	Steel roller coaster	Beijing Shibaolai Amusement Equipment	March 21	
Moto Coaster	Jin Jiang Action Park	Motorbike roller coaster	Zamperla	2009	
Mumbo Jumbo	Flamingo Land	Steel roller coaster	S&S Sansei Technologies	July 4	
Prowler	World of Fun	Wooden roller coaster	Great Coasters International	May 2	
Saw - The Ride	Thorpe Park	Euro-Fighter	Gerstlauer	March 14	
Stingray	Giant Wheel of Suzhou	Flying roller coaster	Vekoma	July 18	
Tornado	Dyrehavsbakken	Spinning roller coaster	Intamin	2009	
Wooden Coaster - Fireball	Happy Valley Shanghai	Wooden roller coaster	Martin & Vleminckx	August 16	

==== Relocated ====
Name	Park	Type	Manufacturer	Opened	Formerly	Ref(s)
The Dark Knight	Six Flags Mexico	Indoor Wild Mouse roller coaster	Mack Rides	March 19	The Dark Knight at Six Flags New England	
Carolina Cobra	Carowinds	Boomerang roller coaster	Vekoma	March 28	Head Spin at Geauga Lake	
Hornet	Wonderland Amusement Park	Steel roller coaster	Vekoma	June 3	Mayan Mindbender at Six Flags AstroWorld	

==== Refurbished ====
Name	Park	Type	Manufacturer	Opened	Formerly	Ref(s)
Bizarro	Six Flags Great Adventure	Floorless roller coaster	Bolliger & Mabillard	May 23	Medusa	
Bizarro	Six Flags New England	Steel roller coaster	Intamin	May 23	Superman - Ride of Steel	

=== Other Attractions ===
==== New ====
Name	Park	Type	Opened	Ref(s)
4D Motion Theater	Glenwood Caverns Adventure Park	4D Theater	May 2009	
All Wheels Extreme Stunt Show	California's Great America	Show	June 2009	
Americana	Kings Dominion	Ferris Wheel	2009	
AVPX	Dreamworld	Indoor laser skirmish	April 10	
Bayern Kurve	Kennywood	Bayern Kurve	2009	
Buccaneer Battle	Six Flags Great America	Boat Ride	May 12	
Creature from the Black Lagoon: The Musical	Universal Studios Hollywood	Show	June 30	
Extreme Log Ride!	Adventuredome	Log Flume	2009	
Giraffica	Holiday World	Shoot the Chute	2009	
Jolly Jester	Lake Compounce	Pirate Ship	May 9	
Laser Raiders	Legoland Windsor Resort	Interactive Dark Ride	March 20	
Mega Vortex	Waldameer & Water World	Zamperla Mega Disk'O	May 2	
Monsters, Inc. Ride & Go Seek	Tokyo Disneyland	Dark Ride	April 15	
Nightwing	Six Flags New England	Slingshot	2009	
Sea Dragon	Beech Bend Park	Pirate Ship	2009	
The Good Time Theatre	Dorney Park	Theater	May 23	
The Universal Music Plaza Stage	Universal Studios Florida	Show Area	June 13	
Wipeout	Lake Compounce	Wipeout	2009	

==== Refurbished ====
Name	Park	Opened	Formerly	Ref(s)
Monster Mansion	Six Flags Over Georgia	May 2009	The Monster Plantation	

==== Relocated ====
Name	Park	Opened	Formerly	Ref(s)
Sasquatch	Six Flags Great Escape	2009	Bayou Blaster and Sonic Slam at Six Flags New Orleans	

== Closed attractions & roller coasters ==
Name	Park	Type	Closed	Ref(s)
Astropax 18	VVC Wheel Park	Steel roller coaster	2009	
Big Bad Wolf	Busch Gardens Williamsburg	Suspended roller coaster	September 7	
Bumper Boats	Valleyfair	Bumper Boats	2009	
Chang	Kentucky Kingdom	Stand-Up roller coaster	2009	
Crazy Mouse	South Pier	Wild Mouse roller coaster	2009	
Dreamworld Helicopters	Dreamworld	Helicopter joy flights	June 10	
Eagle Fortress	Everland	Suspended roller coaster	January 2009	
Gold Rush	Wild Adventures	Family roller coaster	2009	
Greezed Lightnin'	Kentucky Kingdom	Shuttle loop	2009	
Hang Ten	Freestyle Music Park	Family roller coaster	2009	
Iron Horse	Freestyle Music Park	Steel roller coaster	2009	
King Kahuna	Kennywood	Top Spin	2009	
Korkkiruuvi	Särkänniemi Amusement Park	Steel roller coaster	2009	
Looping Star	Beech Bend Park	Steel roller coaster	September 2009	
Looping Star	Holnemvolt Park	Steel roller coaster	2009	
Montana Rusa	Tibidabo Amusement Park	Steel roller coaster	January 5	
Odin Express	Kurashiki Tivoli Park	Steel roller coaster	January 1	
Pegasus	Efteling	Wooden roller coaster	June 19	
Rakevet Harim	Luna Park Tel Aviv	Steel roller coaster	2009	
Rat	Loudoun Castle	Wild Mouse roller coaster	2009	
Road Runner Express	Kentucky Kingdom	Wild Mouse roller coaster	2009	
Round About	Freestyle Music Park	Steel roller coaster	2009	
Soak'd	Freestyle Music Park	Suspended roller coaster	2009	
Son Of Beast	Kings Island	Wooden roller coaster	June 2009	
Tasses Magique	La Ronde	Teacups	2009	
Texas Giant	Six Flags Over Texas	Wooden roller coaster	November 1	
Time Machine	Freestyle Music Park	Steel roller coaster	2009	
Toboggan	Trimper's Rides	Steel roller coaster	2009	
Turbo Mountain	Adventure World	Steel roller coaster	2009	
Turnpike	Kennywood	Antique Cars	2009	
Viper	Barry Island Pleasure Park	Steel roller coaster	2009	
Vortex	Dreamworld	Gravitron	February	
Windstorm	Fun Forest Amusement Park	Steel roller coaster	2009	
