= Desmo Race =

Rollercoaster at Mirabilandia

Mirabilandia (Italy)
- Coordinates: 44.3389°N 12.2636°E
- Status: Operating
- Opening date: July 25, 2019

General statistics
- Type: Steel – Dueling – Racing
- Manufacturer: Maurer AG
- Model: Spike Dragster
- Lift/launch system: Powered
	Track 1	Track 2
Height	72.2 ft (22.0 m)	72.2 ft (22.0 m)
Length	1,722.4 ft (525.0 m)	1,722.4 ft (525.0 m)
Speed	49.7 mph (80.0 km/h)	49.7 mph (80.0 km/h)
Inversions	0	0
Duration	1:00	1:00
G-force	1.2	1.2
- Capacity: 1,000 riders per hour
- Trains: 12 trains with a single car. Riders are arranged 1 across in 2 rows for a total of 2 riders per train.
- Desmo Race at RCDB; Pictures of Desmo Race at RCDB

Desmo Race is a dueling roller coaster at Mirabilandia in Ravenna, Italy. The pair of coasters opened as a part of the park's new €25,000,000 Ducati World in July 2019.

== Announcement and construction ==
In November 2017, Parques Reunidos, Mirabilandia's owners, announced plans to build a 115,000 square foot Ducati Motorcycle themed land in 2019, in league with Ducati themselves. This themed land would be located on the north side of the park, near the Eurowheel. Early concept artwork lead to speculation that a dueling Spike Coaster system would be a part of this, among some children's rides and simulator attractions. This was later confirmed in various articles. Construction began on July 5, 2018, with a ceremony held for the official laying of the first stone of Ducati World. The first piece of track was later erected on October 11, 2018. More details about the coaster, then known by the temporary codename Superbike Race, were revealed at IAAPA in 2018, as well as a model. The official name was also revealed to be Desmo Race. The ride opened alongside Ducati World in July 2019.

== Characteristics ==
=== Ride model ===
Desmo Race is the first dueling Spike Dragster, a concept that Maurer AG spent years working on. A single tracked prototype was installed at Skyline Park in 2017, but this version is not a prototype and has two much longer, parallel throttle embedded in each car, thus classifying them as powered coasters.

=== Statistics ===
Desmo Race's tracks are 1,722.4 ft (525.0 m) long and have a peak height of 72.2 ft (22.0 m). The coaster's speed is 49.7 mph (80.0 km/h). Each track can accommodate up to 500 riders an hour, but given that both tracks will run simultaneously, a capacity of 1,000 riders per hour can be achieved.

=== Trains ===
Desmo Race utilizes 12 cars between both tracks, each of which can hold up to two riders. The cars are outfitted with a throttle, an LED dashboard, lights, and even an onboard audio system to create a unique and immersive coaster experience. The cars resemble Ducati's futuristic Panigale V4 motorcycle series. Riders will be able to use the throttle and control their speed and acceleration.

=== Layout ===
Both tracks will feature a meandering layout that includes plenty of twists, S-turns, helixes, dips, valleys, and hills. The loading area/station is located in the centre of the there-and-back layout, much like the prototype installed at Skyline Park, except much larger, spread out, and complex. Both tracks constantly interact with and weave in and out of one another.

== Similar rides ==
The coaster operates much like an alpine coaster/mountain coaster, where the 1-2 person cars are lifted to the starting elevation by at least one lift hill at the start or end of the experience, and much like the Spike Dragster, riders are able to control their speed by pushing physical levers that directly control the speed of the descent. Spike Dragsters, however, operate with a different throttle system that indirectly controls the speed of the coaster.

The first Spike Dragster was Sky Dragster, a prototype built at Skyline Park in Bad Wörishofen, Germany. The coaster only has a single track with a length of 889.1 ft (271 meters) and a peak height of 38.7 ft (11.8 meters). The coaster operates 4 cars, enabling a theoretical hourly capacity of 200 riders. The ride system is identical to that of Desmo Race. Carnival Cruise Lines also announced that their new Mardi Gras ship setting sail in 2020 is including Bolt; Ultimate Sea Coaster, the first Spike Dragster coaster in the North American market and the first roller coaster out at sea. Before the concept existed, coasters were unreliable at sea due to maintenance needs and the high risk of hitting bottom due to the shifting motion of the boat at sea. That second factor does not affect the Spike Dragster model as they are powered coasters and don't rely on a downhill slope to keep their momentum. Like Sky Dragster, Bolt will have a single track.
