= Aquaflex =

American waterproof flooring installation brand

- Company type: Private
- Industry: Building materials
- Founded: 2000
- Headquarters: Southern California, United States
- Products: Waterproof flooring installation systems; concrete repair materials

Aquaflex is an American brand of waterproof flooring installation and concrete repair products manufactured by Formulators, a privately held building materials company based in Southern California.

The Aquaflex line is built around patented moisture-cure adhesive technology designed to provide waterproof installation of resilient floor coverings over concrete subfloors with elevated moisture and alkalinity levels.

Formulators was established in 2000 as a research and development manufacturer specialising in niche building products intended to address failures in conventional flooring installation systems, and produces Aquaflex as its specialty construction brand of flooring installation and repair materials.

== History ==
Formulators introduced Aquaflex as a moisture-mitigation system based on a waterproof adhesive formulated for resilient flooring installations over concrete substrates with high moisture and pH levels. In May 2015 the company announced that this adhesive technology had been granted patent protection in the United States for an adhesive mixture suitable for flooring installations over concrete with a combination of elevated moisture and alkalinity.

In May 2016 Aquaflex introduced Aquaflex^{2} PSA, a moisture-cure, waterproof pressure-sensitive adhesive

Later in 2016 Aquaflex launched a silica-free waterproof concrete repair range, including patching, skim and self-levelling materials formulated without respirable crystalline silica, aimed in part at helping flooring contractors comply with updated U.S. Occupational Safety and Health Administration regulations on silica exposure.

== Products and technology ==
Aquaflex products are marketed as a complete flooring installation system that combines moisture mitigation, adhesive and cementitious repair materials.

== Other uses ==
The words "Aquaflex", "Aqua Flex" and "Aqua-Flex" are used as trade names for a variety of unrelated commercial products and technologies in sectors other than flooring. Examples include potable water bladder tanks for temporary drinking-water storage, aquaculture and feed-processing equipment manufactured by Wenger, flexographic plate-making systems supplied to packaging printers, pond-liner materials and other geosynthetics, splash pad surfacing used in recreational water-play facilities, and water-based ink systems for printing.
