= Mirabilandia (Italy) =

Theme park in Savio, Italy

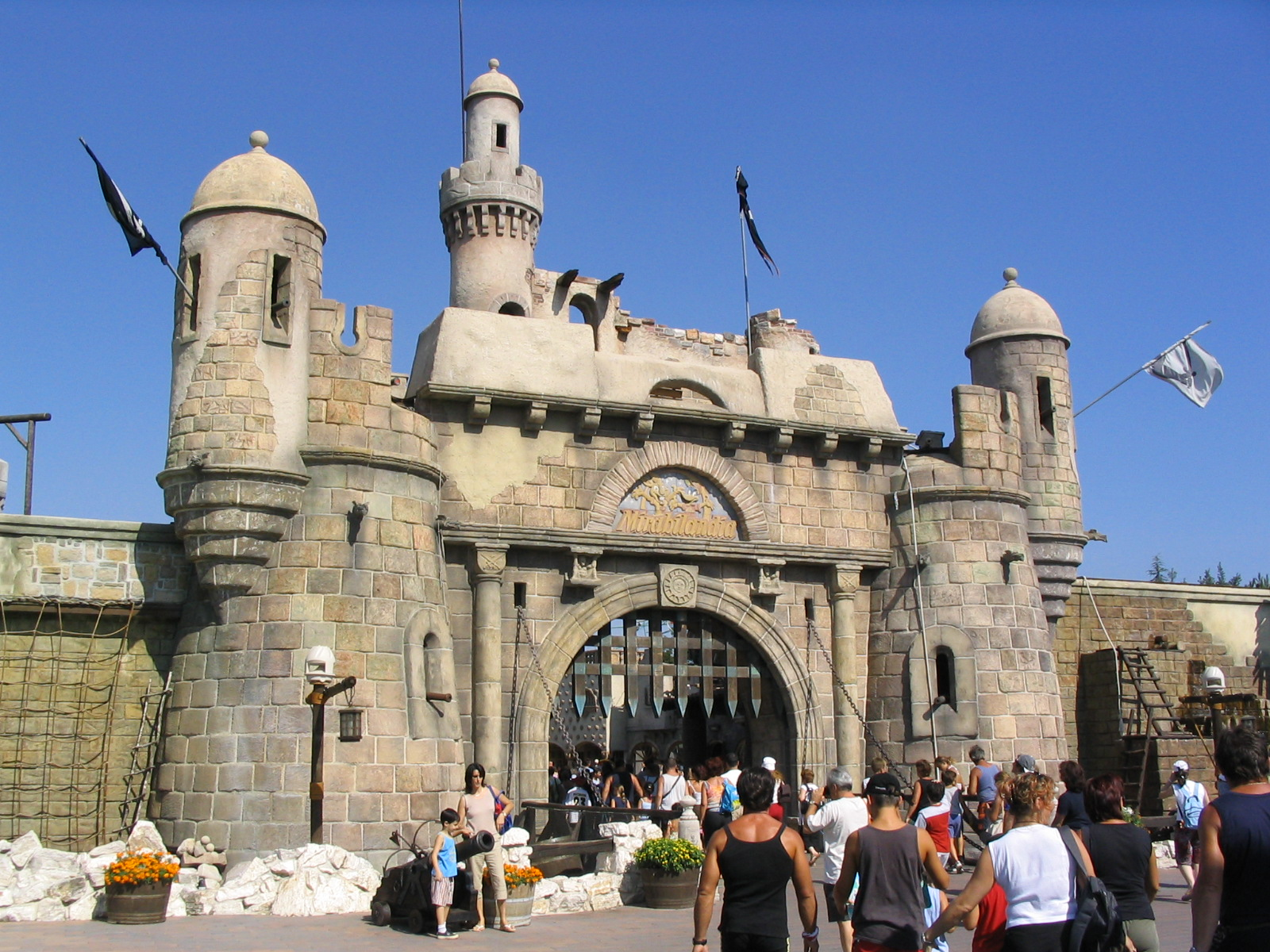
- Mirabilandia's entrance
- Interactive map of Mirabilandia
- Location: Savio, Ravenna (RA), Emilia-Romagna, Italy
- Coordinates: 44°20′14″N 12°15′48″E
- Opened: 4 July 1992
- Owner: Parques Reunidos
- Slogan: Your little vacation, your greatest emotion!
- Attendance: 2.0 million
- Area: 85 ha (210 acres)

Attractions
- Total: 41
- Roller coasters: 10
- Water rides: 8
- Website: mirabilandia.it (English, ItaIian, German)

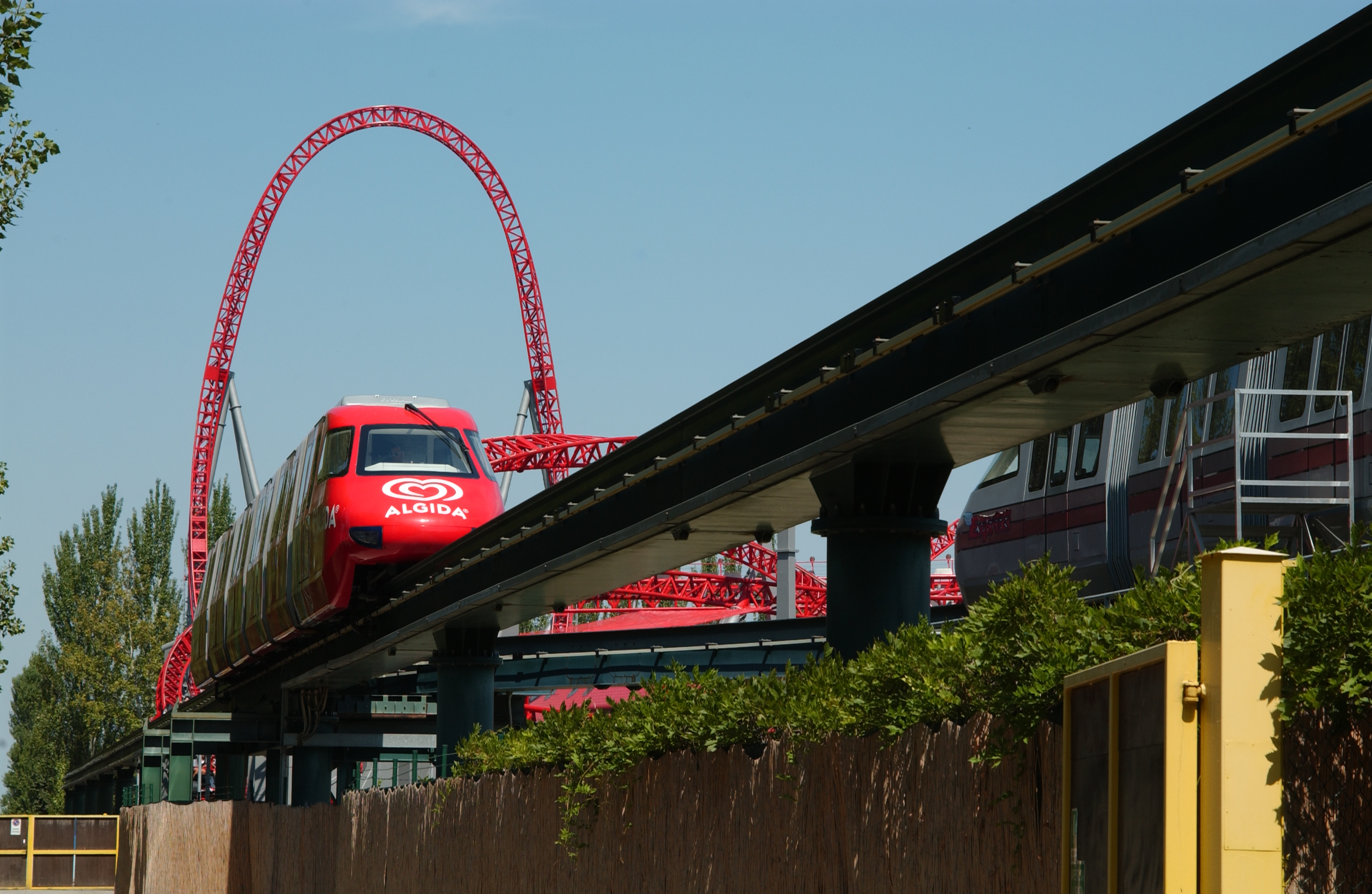
The monorail at Mirabilandia

Mirabilandia is a 210-acre theme park, located in Savio, Italy, a frazione of Ravenna, which is located in Emilia-Romagna. With a total area of 850,000 square metres, it is the biggest park in Italy.

It has an area of 55 hectares, with an additional waterpark area of 12 hectares, called Mirabeach. The most notable attractions are the Katun inverted roller coaster and the iSpeed launched coaster. It has the world's tallest watercoaster, the "Divertical" with a height of 60 m. It also has the only spike dueling coaster in the world: Desmo Race.

It houses the 92-metre tall Eurowheel, Europe's second tallest Ferris wheel.

== History ==
The themed areas present today are:

- Pirate Bay (pirate-themed entrance plaza)
- Route 66 (American 60s)
- Ducati World
- Adventureland (a leafy zone, into this area there is the City of Sian Ka 'an, a mayan land around Katun)
- Nickelodeon Land
- Dinoland (dinosaurs' area)
- Far West Valley (cowboys' area)

The park opened its doors on 4 July 1992, located next to the pine grove in Classe, on the Adriatica state road, among the first shareholders there was Silvio Berlusconi.

Among its opening-day attractions was Sierra Tonante, a wooden roller coaster, and Rio Bravo, a water itinerary among the rapids aboard special rafts where still today it is possible to have a great time.

But in 1996 the park was in danger of bankruptcy, so the next year it's sold to the Loeffelhardt-Casoli group (joint venture between the company that owns Phantasialand and the Italian Casoli).

In 1997, the 60-metre-tall Torri Gemelle (today Oil Towers) and the Scuola di Polizia stunt show were added. New scenery and theming depicting exotic and fantastic places was also added. Most prominently, the entrance plaza rethemed and renamed Pirate Bay. The restaurants had a similar re-theming (like the "Locanda del Faro").

In 1998, Pakal (today Gold Digger), a wild mouse roller coaster, was added.

In 1999, the 92-metre-tall Eurowheel, the tallest Ferris wheel in Europe at the time, Niagara (today El Dorado Falls), and the Mirabilandia Express opened.

In 2000 has opened Katun, the longest inverted roller coaster in Europe, themed with the city of Sian Ka'an, a big Mayan zone around the coaster.

In 2003, Mirabilandia Beach (today Mirabeach), a water park, was added. It was expanded in 2004.

Following the success, in 2006, the Spanish company Parques Reunidos, one of the leading companies in the amusement parks sector, became interested in the park and bought it.

In the following years, Leprotto Express, Raratonga, and Reset, the first interactive dark ride in Italy, were added. Around Reset there is a zone which represents a post-apocalyptic New York.

In 2009, iSpeed, a launched roller coaster, opened, replacing Sierra Tonante (which had closed in 2007) and becoming the tallest and fastest roller coaster in Italy, featuring an acceleration of 0 to 100 km/h in 2.2 seconds.

In 2011 Master Thai, the first dueling roller coaster in Italy was added.

In 2012, Divertical, the tallest water coaster in the world was inaugurated.

In 2014, the children's area Dinoland opened with attractions including Reptilium, Raptotana, Rexplorer, Bicisauro, Brontocars, and Monosauro.

In 2015 the stunt show got a partnership with Hot Wheels and a 18 metres in height mobile loop, the tallest loop in the world made by a car.

In 2016, the Far West Valley area opened its doors, featuring the largest Horror House in Europe, Legends of Dead Town.

In 2018, Mirabeach completed a 20,000-square-metre expansion.

In 2019, the motorcycle-themed, 35,000-square-metre Ducati World area opened, featuring the world's first spike dueling roller coaster in the world, Desmo Race.

In 2022 the horror house of The Walking Dead opens to replace Legends of Dead Town, moreover the park enters into a collaboration with Nickelodeon, which introduces the most popular cartoon mascots in the park with a meet & greet and a new live show.

In 2025, following the collaboration with Paramount and Nickelodeon, the park opened the new area Nickelodeon Land.

Every year, during Halloween season, the park adds Suburbia, the biggest horror zone in Italy, Acid Rain, Apartment #162, Llorona and Mr. Blackmoon's Hypnotic Circus, which are other four free horror houses in addition to The Walking Dead.

== Current rides ==
Name	Type	Opened	Area	Manufacturer
Adventure Bay Carousel	Carousel	2025	Nickelodeon Land	Unknown
Aquila Tonante	Kite Flyer	2016	Far West Valley	Zamperla
Autosplash	Log Flume	1992	Route 66	Intamin
Bicisauro	Magic Bikes	2014	Dinoland	Zamperla
Bikini Bottom Epress	Crazy Bus	2025	Nickelodeon Land	Zamperla
Blu River	Harakiri Slide	1992	Route 66	Preston & Barbieri
Boots' Balloons	Balloon Race	2025	Nickelodeon Land	Zamperla
Buffalo Bill Rodeo	Disk'O Coaster	2016	Far West Valley	Zamperla
Campo Sioux	Playground	2016	Far West Valley	Unknown
Cowabunga Carts	Force 190 Coaster	2025	Nickelodeon Land	Zierer
Desmo Race (Track 1)	Spike Dueling and Racing Coaster	2019	Ducati World	Maurer AG
Desmo Race (Track 2)	Spike Dueling and Racing Coaster	2019	Ducati World	Maurer AG
Diavel Ring	Flat Ride	2019	Ducati World	Zamperla
DiVertical	Water Coaster	2012	Route 66	Intamin
Dora's Train Adventure	Train Ride	1992	Nickelodeon Land	Mack Rides
El Dorado Falls	Shoot the Chute	1999	Far West Valley	Hopkins
Eurowheel	Ferris Wheel	1999		Pax
Fantasyland	Playground	1992	Bimbopoli	Unknown
Flying Arturo	Aerial Carousel	2006	Bimbopoli	Preston & Barbieri
Fort Alamo	Playground	2016	Far West Valley	Unknown
Geronimo	Drop towers	2016	Far West Valley	Zamperla
Gold Digger	Wild Mouse Coaster	1998	Far West Valley	L&T Systems
iSpeed	Blitz Coaster	2009	Route 66	Intamin
Jellyfish Jam	Skydiver	2025	Nickelodeon Land	Zierer
Katun	Inverted Coaster	2000	City of Sian Ka 'an (Adventureland)	Bolliger & Mabillard
Kiddy Monster	Flat Ride	2019	Ducati World	Zamperla
Master Thai	Möbius Loop Dueling Coaster	2011	Adventureland	Preston & Barbieri
Monosauro	Monorail	2004	Dinoland	Zamperla
Oil Tower 1	Space Shot Tower	1997	Far West Valley	S&S Sansei
Oil Tower 2	Drop Tower	1997	Far West Valley	S&S Sansei
Paw Patrol to the Rescue	Junior Coaster	2005	Nickelodeon Land	Zamperla
Raptotana	Tea Cups	1992	Dinoland	Zamperla
Rubble's Rapids	Log Flume	2000	Nickelodeon Land	L&T Systems
The Walking Dead	Haunted House	2022	Far West Valley	
Raratonga	Shooting Boat Ride	2007	Adventureland	Preston & Barbieri
Reptilium	Aerial Carousel	1992	Dinoland	Zamperla
Reset	Shooting Ominimover Dark Ride	2008		Mack Rides
Rexpolorer	Powered Coaster	1992	Dinoland	Mack Rides
Rio Bravo	River Rapids Ride	1992	Adventureland	Intamin
Scrambler Run	Race Bike Track	2019	Ducati World	Zamperla
Splish Splat	Splash Pad	2013	Nickelodeon Land	Vortex International

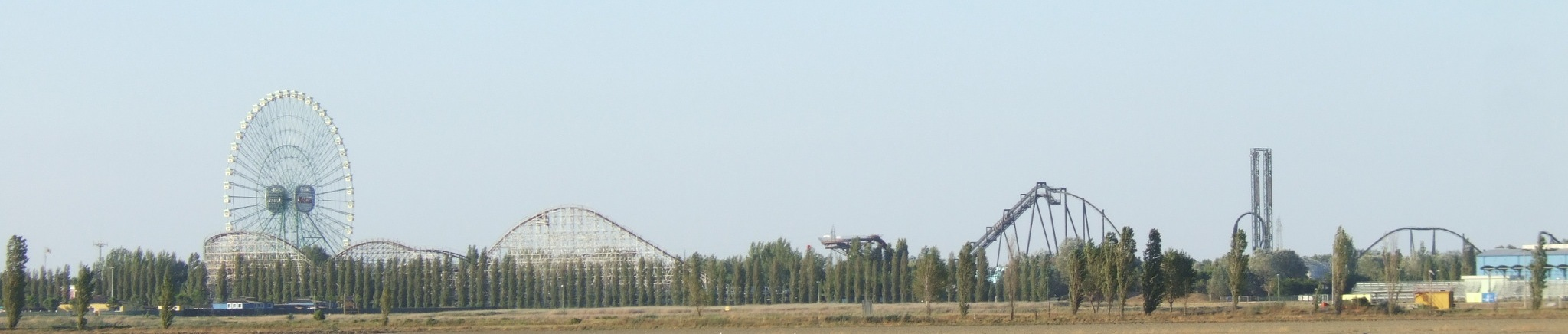
The Katun inverted rollercoaster with the 92 m tall Eurowheel in the background

== See also ==
- List of amusement parks in Italy
