= Ducati (company) =

Italian company group

Ducati is a group of companies, best known for manufacturing motorcycles and headquartered in Borgo Panigale, Bologna, Italy.

== History ==
=== Early days ===
In 1926, Antonio Cavalieri Ducati and his three sons, Adriano, Marcello, and Bruno Cavalieri Ducati, founded Società Scientifica Radiobrevetti Ducati (SSR Ducati) in Bologna to produce vacuum tubes, condensers, and other radio components.

In 1935, they had become successful enough to enable construction of a new factory in the Borgo Panigale area of the city. Production was maintained during World War II, despite the Ducati factory being a repeated target of Allied bombing.

It was finally destroyed by around 40 Consolidated B-24 Liberators on 12 October 1944 as part of the United States Army Air Forces's Operation Pancake, which involved some 700 aircraft flying from airfields in the Province of Foggia. Nonetheless, it maintained production.

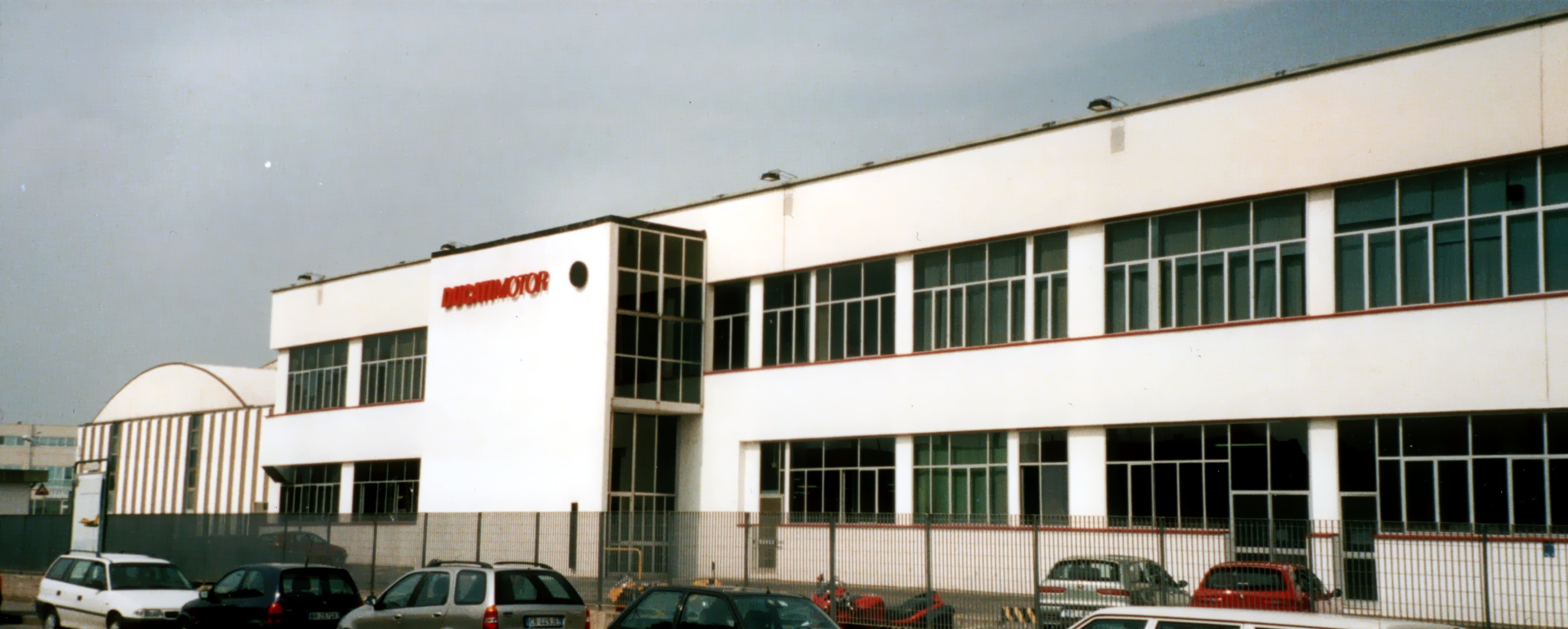
Ducati Factory

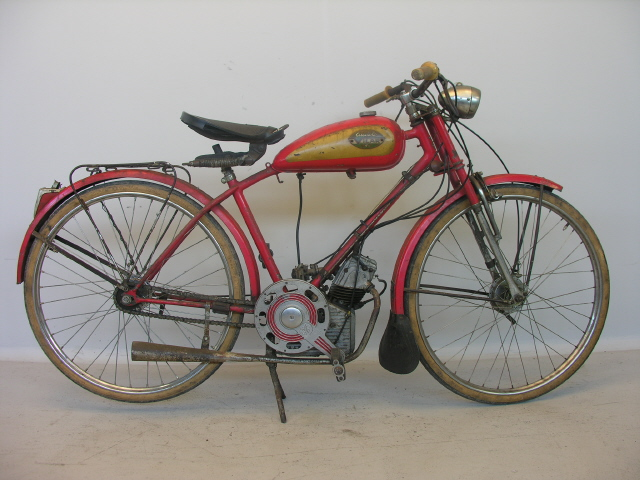
Ducati "Cucciolo", 1950

=== Venturing into motorcycles ===
The company started manufacturing motorcycle-related items when in 1950, manufacturing the "Cucciolo", an engine for mounting on bicycles, for a small Turinese firm, SIATA (Societa Italiana per Applicazioni Tecniche Auto-Aviatorie), later selling a product of their own based on the Cucciolo.

This first Ducati motorcycle was a 48 cc bike weighing 98 lb (44 kg), with a top speed of 40 mph (64 km/h), and had a 15 mm carburetor (0.59 in) giving just under 200 mpg_{‑US} (1.2 L/100 km; 240 mpg_{‑imp}). Ducati soon dropped the Cucciolo name in favor of "55M" and "65TL".

In the following years, the company expanded their offer when the market moved on to larger motorcycles.

When the market moved toward larger motorcycles, Ducati management decided to respond, making an impression at an early-1952 Milan show, introducing their 65TS cycle and Cruiser (a four-stroke motor scooter).

Despite being described as the most interesting new machine at the 1952 show, the Cruiser was not a great success, and only a few thousand were made over a two-year period before the model ceased production.

By 1954, Ducati Meccanica SpA had increased production to 120 bikes a day.

In the 1960s, Ducati earned its place in motorcycling history by producing the fastest 250cc road bike then available, the Mach 1.

=== Management split ===
In 1953, management split the company into two separate entities, Ducati Meccanica SpA and Ducati Elettrotecnica, in acknowledgment of its diverging motorcycle and electronics product lines. Ducati Elettrotecnica became Ducati Energia SpA in the eighties.

Dr. Giuseppe Montano took over as head of Ducati Meccanica SpA and the Borgo Panigale factory was modernized with government assistance.

=== Changed ownership ===
In 1985, Cagiva bought Ducati and planned to rebadge Ducati motorcycles with the "Cagiva" name.

By the time the purchase was completed, Cagiva kept the "Ducati" name on its motorcycles.

Eleven years later, in 1996, Cagiva accepted the offer from Texas Pacific Group and sold a 51% stake in the company for US$325 million; then, in 1998, Texas Pacific Group bought most of the remaining 49% to become the sole owner of Ducati.

In 1999, TPG issued an initial public offering of Ducati stock and renamed the company "Ducati Motor Holding SpA".

TPG sold over 65% of its shares in Ducati, leaving TPG the majority shareholder.

In December 2005, Ducati returned to Italian ownership with the sale of Texas Pacific's stake (minus one share) to Investindustrial Holdings, the investment fund of Carlo and Andrea Bonomi.

In April 2012, Volkswagen Group's Audi subsidiary announced its intention to buy Ducati for €860 million (US$1.2 billion).

Volkswagen chairman Ferdinand Piëch, a motorcycle enthusiast, had long coveted Ducati, and had regretted that he passed up an opportunity to buy the company from the Italian government in 1984.

Analysts doubted a tiny motorcycle maker would have a meaningful effect on a company the size of Volkswagen, commenting that the acquisition has "a trophy feel to it," and, "is driven by VW's passion for nameplates rather than industrial or financial logic". Italian luxury car brand Lamborghini was strengthened under VW ownership.

Audi AG's Automobili Lamborghini S.p.A. subsidiary acquired 100 percent of the shares of Ducati Motor Holding S.p.A. on 19 July 2012 for €747 million (US$909 million).

== Current divisions ==
The group currently comprises four companies:

Component	Description	Notes
Ducati Motor Holding	Motorcycle-manufacturing division	Previously known as Ducati Meccanica
Ducati Corse	Runs the Ducati motorcycle racing program	Wholly owned by Ducati Motor Holding
Ducati Energia	Designer and manufacturer of electrical and electronic components and systems	Formerly known as Ducati Elettrotecnica
Ducati Sistemi	Provides electronic and information-technology products for road transport, railway transport, and transport automation applications	Subsidiary of Ducati Energia

== Ownership ==
Since 1926, Ducati has been owned by a number of groups and companies.

Era	Owner	Notes
1926–1950	(Italy) Ducati family	N/A
1950–1967	(Italy) Istituto per la Ricostruzione Industriale	Government management
1967–1978	(Italy) Ente partecipazioni e Finanziamento Industrie Manifatturiere	Government management; control over day-to-day factory operations; headed by Giuseppe Montano and Cristiano de Eccher
1978–1985	(Germany) VM Group	N/A
1985–1996	(Italy) Cagiva	N/A
1996–2005	(United States) Texas-Pacific Group	Goes public; headed by Federico Minoli during 1996–2001 and 2003–2007
2005–2008	(Italy) Investindustrial Holdings S.p.A.	N/A
2008–2012	(Italy) Performance Motorcycles S.p.A	An investment vehicle formed by Investindustrial Holdings, BS Investimenti and Hospitals of Ontario Pension Plan
19 July 2012 – present	(Italy) Automobili Lamborghini S.p.A.	Audi AG acquired 100% of the voting rights of Ducati Motor Holding S.p.A. via Audi's Automobili Lamborghini S.p.A. subsidiary

== Other products ==
In the 1930s and 1940s, Ducati manufactured radios, cameras, and electrical products such as razors.

Ducati also made a marine binocular called the BIMAR for the Kriegsmarine during World War II, some of which were sold on the civilian market after the war.

The Ducati Sogno was a half-frame Leica-like camera which is now a collector's item. In 2010, Ducati and Bianchi developed and launched a line of racing bicycles.
