= Eurowheel =

Ferris wheel in Savio, Italy

Coordinates: 44.3392161°N 12.2622228°E

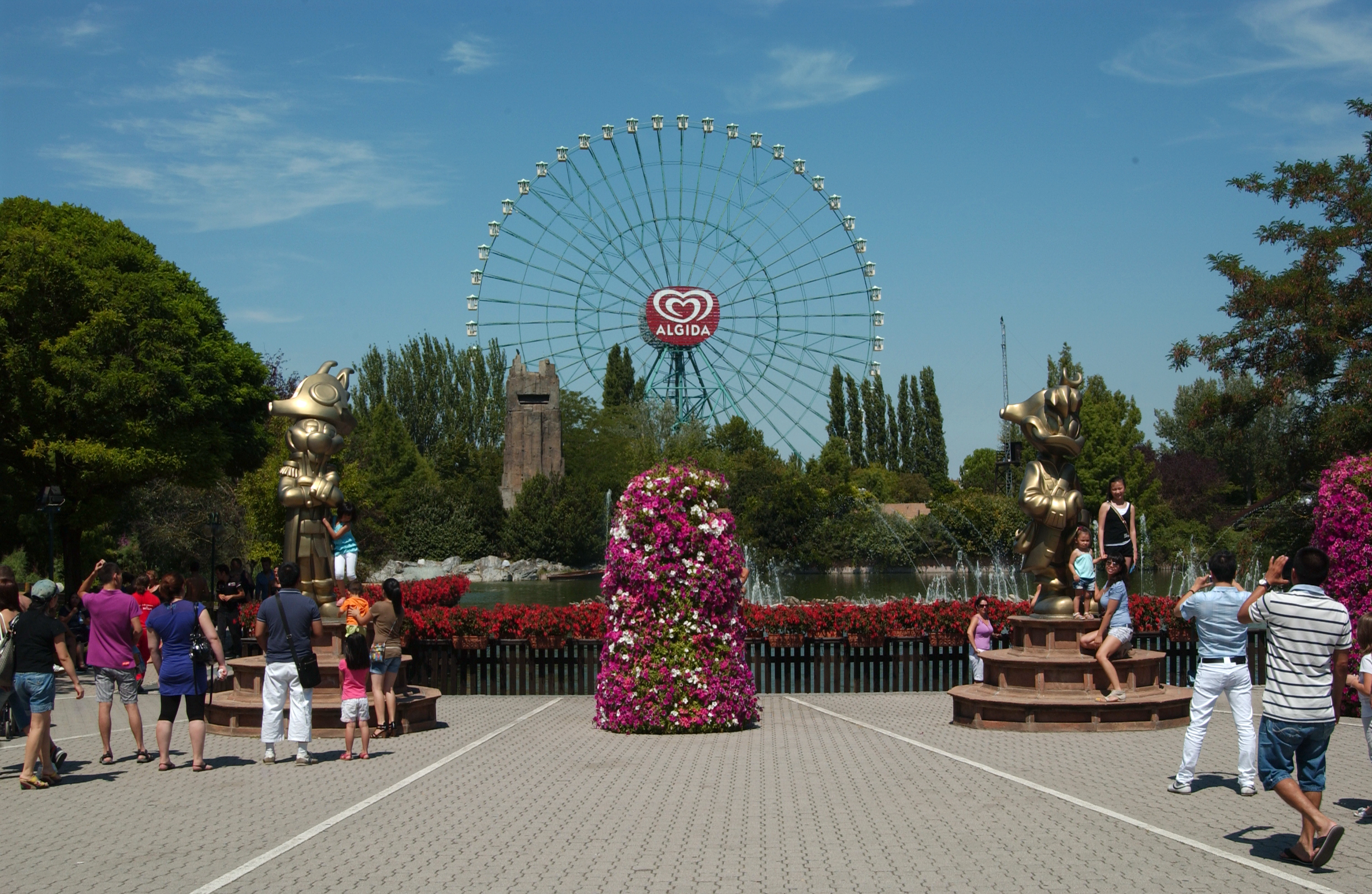
Eurowheel from "Piazza del Levante" in Mirabilandia

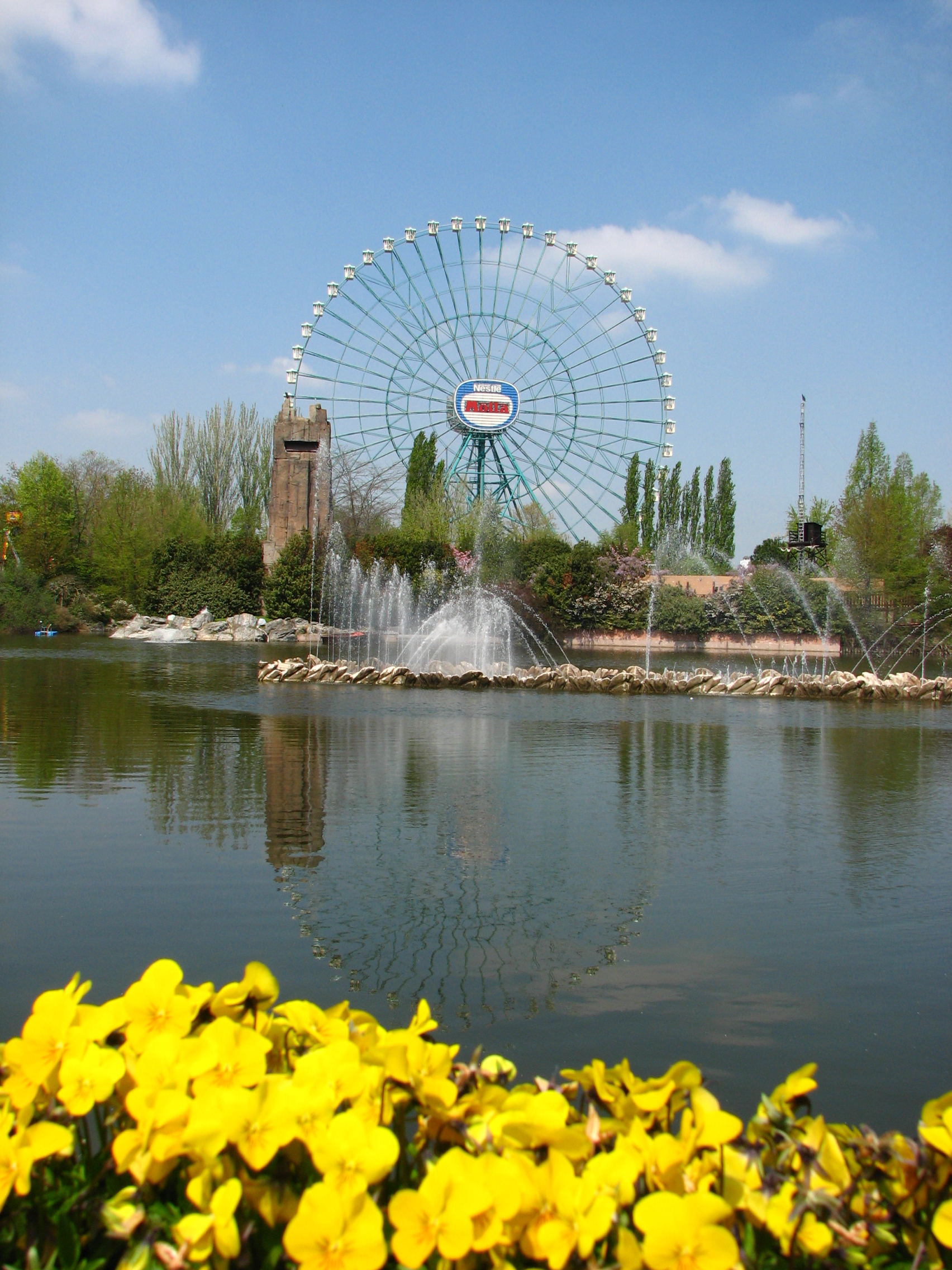
Eurowheel portrait

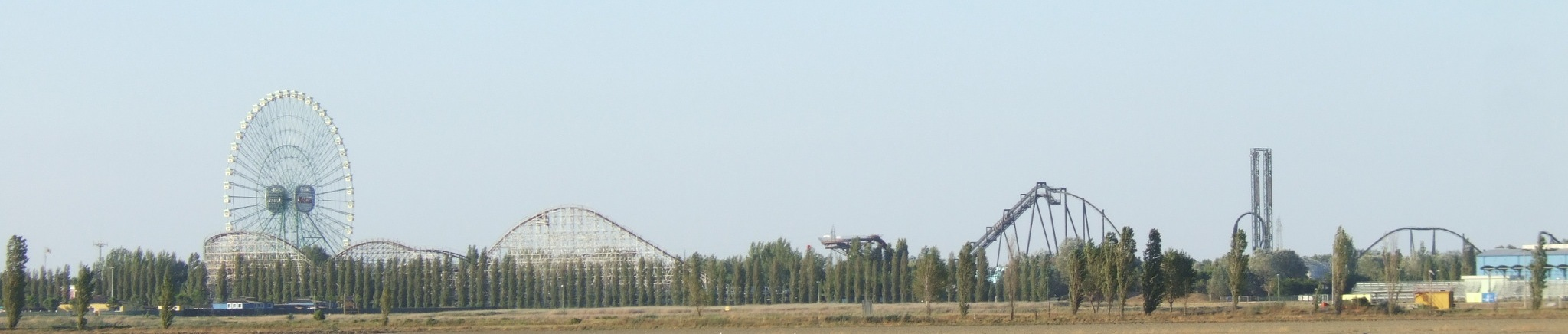
Eurowheel on the Mirabilandia skyline

Eurowheel is a 92-metre (302 ft) tall Ferris wheel at the Mirabilandia amusement park near Ravenna, in Emilia–Romagna, Italy. It is known for its views over Ravenna and nearby beaches, and its 50,000 light bulbs are said to make it the brightest Ferris wheel in the world.

When constructed in 1999, Eurowheel was the tallest extant Ferris wheel in Europe, superseding the 73-metre (240 ft) Moscow-850.

Both the 94-metre (308 ft) Great Wheel, built for the Empire of India Exhibition at Earls Court, London, in 1895, and the 100-metre (330 ft) Grande Roue de Paris, built for the Exposition Universelle of 1900 in Paris, were taller, however the London wheel was demolished in 1907 and the Paris wheel in 1920.

Eurowheel is now Europe's second tallest extant Ferris wheel, after the 130-metre (430 ft) London Eye, which officially opened on 31 December 1999, but which did not open to the public until March 2000 because of technical problems.

Eurowheel has a 90 cm (2 ft 11 in) minimum passenger height restriction.
