= Abyss (roller coaster) =

Steel roller coaster in Adventure World

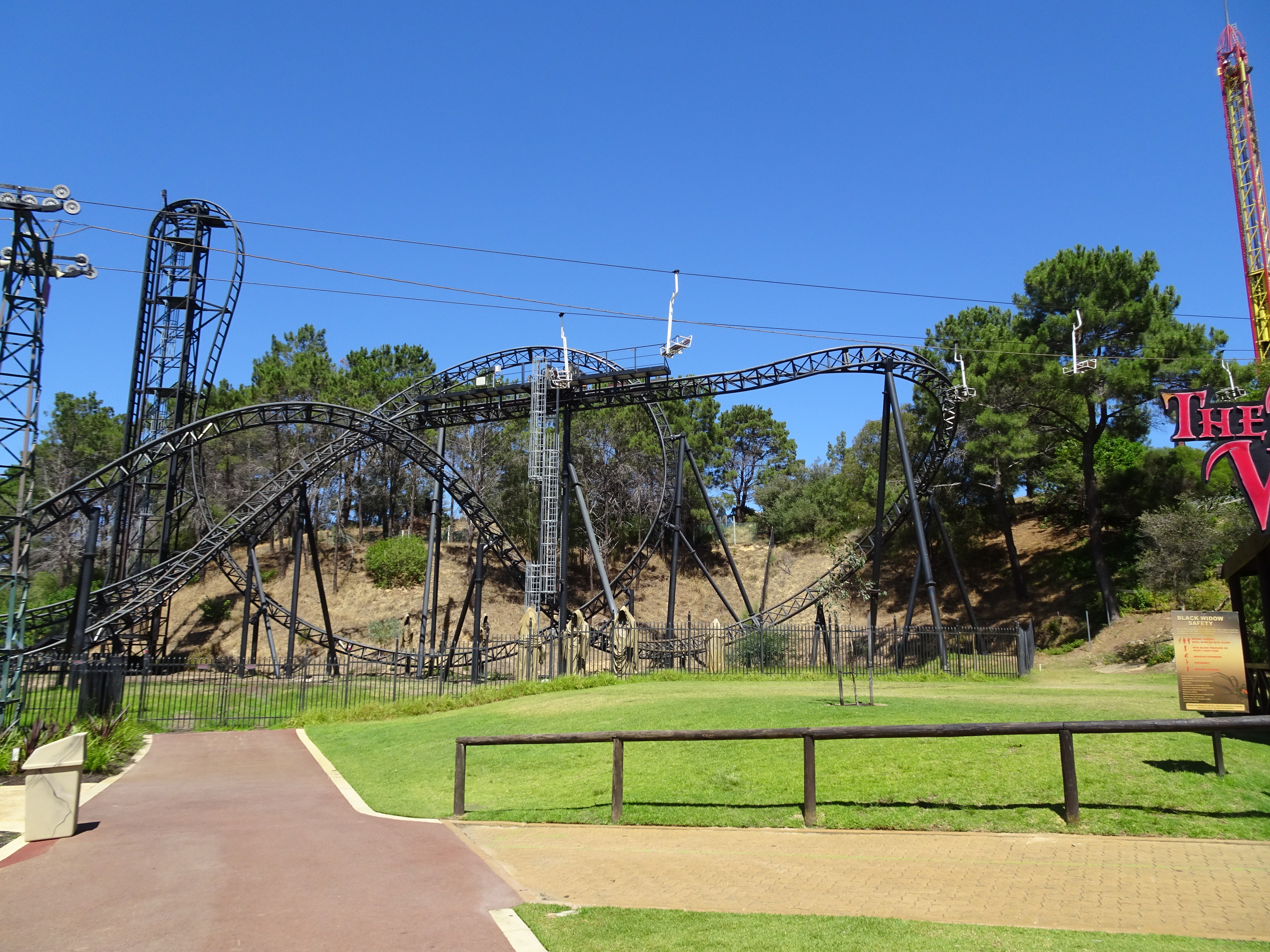

Adventure World
- Location: Adventure World
- Coordinates: 32.095482°S 115.817001°E
- Status: Operating
- Opening date: 1 November 2013
- Cost: A$12 million

General statistics
- Type: Steel – Euro-Fighter
- Manufacturer: Gerstlauer
- Model: Euro-Fighter – Custom
- Track layout: Custom
- Lift/launch system: Chain lift hill
- Height: 30 m (98 ft)
- Drop: 30.5 m (100 ft)
- Length: 630 m (2,070 ft)
- Speed: 85 km/h (53 mph)
- Inversions: 3
- Duration: 2 minutes
- Max vertical angle: 100°
- G-force: 4.5
- Height restriction: 125 cm (4 ft 1 in)
- Trains: 4 trains with a single car. Riders are arranged 4 across in 2 rows for a total of 8 riders per train.
- Abyss at RCDB

Abyss is a steel roller coaster located at the Adventure World amusement park in Perth, Western Australia. The $12-million attraction was announced in April 2013, and construction began the following month. It opened to the general public six months later on 1 November 2013.

The Abyss is a Euro-Fighter, a roller coaster model from Gerstlauer that features a "beyond-vertical" first drop which exceeds 90 degrees. In addition to several inversions, the Abyss reaches a top speed of 85 kilometres per hour (53 mph) along the two-minute, 630-metre-long (2,070 ft) ride.

== History ==
In mid-2012, the 15-month phase of planning and construction of Abyss began. In April 2013, Adventure World announced on their Facebook page that they would be adding a $12 million, world-class attraction in 2013. By May 2013 construction had begun. In June 2013, a concrete slab was poured prior to the construction of a show building. Shortly after track arrived in July 2013, Adventure World officially announced that the ride would be a Gerstlauer Euro-Fighter, similar to Saw – The Ride. Construction of the ride was completed by Gerstlauer crews over seven weeks. The name of the attraction was revealed on the Friday the 13th of September 2013 as Abyss. The announcement was made on Friday the 13th due to the ride's horror theme. Abyss officially opened to the public on 1 November 2013 as the single biggest investment in the park's history.

Adventure World's CEO Mark Shaw stated the addition of the Abyss was an attempt to elevate the park "from adventure park to theme park". The park expected double-digit attendance growth following the addition of the ride. Prior to the 2013 opening of Abyss, Adventure World's only roller coaster was Dragon Express, a small junior roller coaster by Zamperla. Adventure World previously operated the Anton Schwarzkopf-designed Turbo Mountain, before its closure and removal in 2009.

== Characteristics ==
Abyss is a custom Gerstlauer Euro-Fighter with 630 metres (2,070 ft) of track. The ride's vertical lift hill takes riders to a height of 30 metres (98 ft) before dropping 30.5 metres (100 ft) in a 100°, beyond-vertical drop. The two-minute ride features a top speed of 85 kilometres per hour (53 mph) and exerts up to 4.5 times the force of gravity on its riders. Abyss contains three inversions including an inline twist enclosed in the ride's show building, as well as an Immelmann loop and a dive loop outdoors. The ride features four trains which each seat riders four-abreast in two rows. The theming around the ride was manufactured in the Philippines and includes thirty 3-metre-tall (9.8 ft) ancient druid guardians, exposed tree roots, upturned trees, and an entrance archway.

== Ride experience ==
The ride begins at the station inside the show building. Once the train departs the station, it makes a slow turn to the right. A quick drop follows, before the train rounds a series of left turns into the first inversion, an inline twist. The train emerges from the show building and makes a slight left towards the 30-metre (98 ft) chain lift hill. Once at the top of the hill, riders drop down 30.5 metres (100 ft) at an angle of 100°. The second inversion of the ride, an Immelmann loop, is followed by an overbanked turn around. An air-time hill, where riders experience the feeling of weightlessness, and a right turn leads into the mid-course brake run. The train exits the brake run with a left turn into a dive loop. A left turn leads the train into the final brake run, before returning to the enclosed station.

== Reception ==
Abyss has been well received. Edwin Dickinson of the Australian Coaster Club praised Abyss for its smoothness, intensity and pacing. He described the ride as better than Superman Escape at Warner Bros. Movie World, stating Adventure World "certainly lifted the bar for roller coasters in Australia". The Australian Associated Press commended the ride's ability to continue to be thrilling after multiple rides. Natalie Bonjolo of Today Tonight stated she didn't "know whether to laugh or cry" at the end of Abyss, describing the ride as unbelievable. Local MP Joe Francis described the ride as an "amazing piece of mechanical engineering".

== See also ==
- 2013 in amusement parks
