= Dragon Express =

Steel roller coaster in Australia

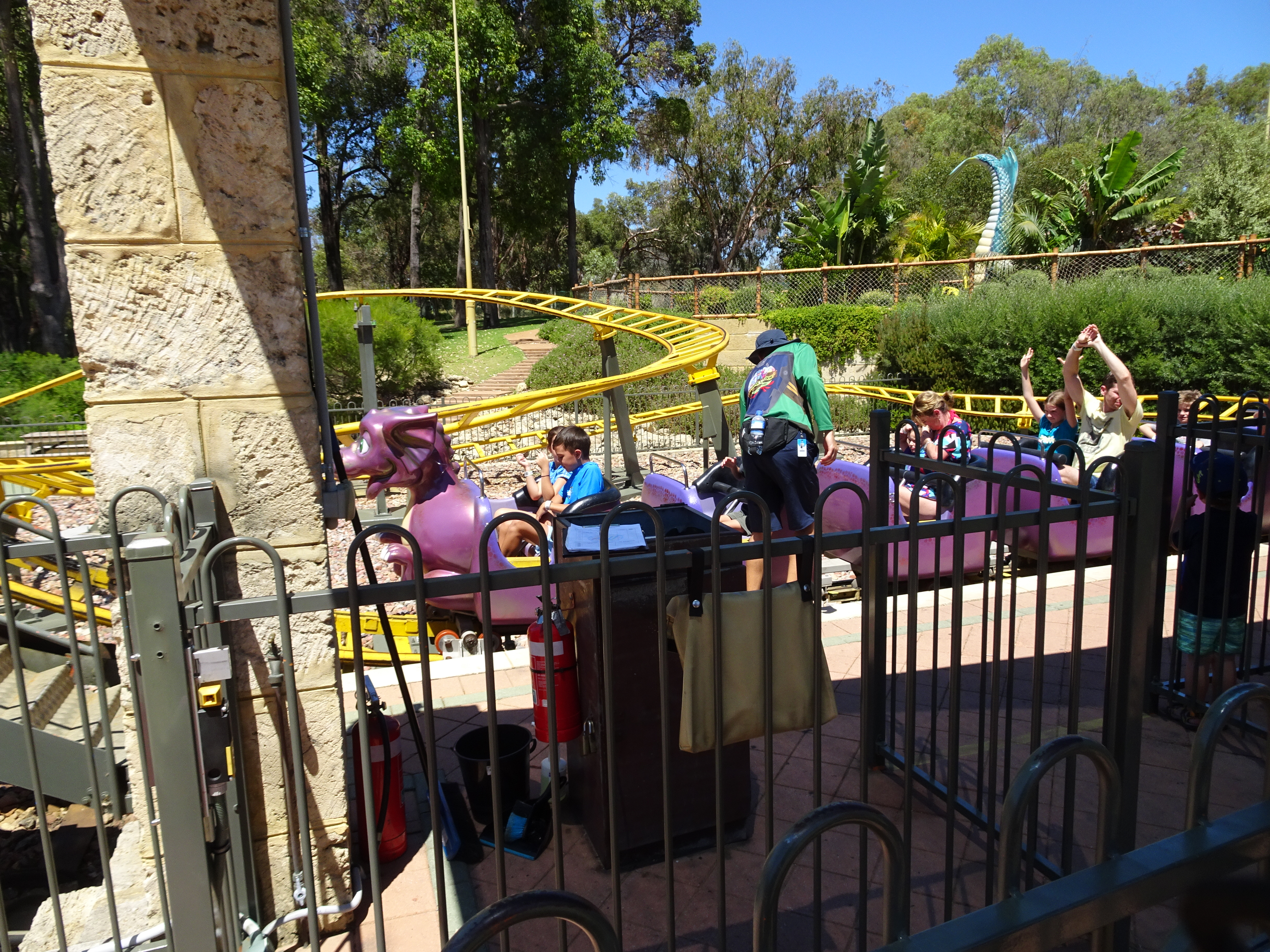

Adventure World
- Location: Adventure World
- Coordinates: 32.096981°S 115.818119°E
- Status: Operating
- Opening date: 27 September 2003

General statistics
- Type: Steel – Family
- Manufacturer: Zamperla
- Model: Family Gravity Coaster 80STD
- Height: 4 m (13 ft)
- Length: 80 m (260 ft)
- Inversions: 0
- Trains: Single train with 6 cars; riders arranged 2 across in a single row for a total of 12 riders per train
- Dragon Express at RCDB

Dragon Express is a steel roller coaster located at Adventure World in Perth, Western Australia, Australia. The ride is a Zamperla Family Gravity Coaster and has been at the park since 27 September 2003.

Dragon Express is a steel-sit down roller coaster for everyone in the family. At its highest point it stands 4.0 metres (13 ft) tall and is 80.0 metres (262.5 ft) long. Dragon Express is a single train with 6 cars. Each car holds 2 riders. The riders are arranged 2 across in a single row of cars for a total of 12 riders.

== See also ==
- MI1
- Turbo Mountain
