= Ducati Energia =

Italian electronics company

Ducati Energia S.p.A.
- Ducati Energia logo (2026) on occasion of its 100 years
- Type: S.p.A.
- Industry: Electrical and electronic equipment
- Founded: 1926; 100 years ago
- Founder: Antonio Cavalieri Ducati; Adriano Cavalieri Ducati; Bruno Cavalieri Ducati; Marcello Cavalieri Ducati
- Headquarters: Bologna, Italy
- Products: Sustainable mobility; Wind turbine; Power-factor correction; Active filters; Power electronics capacitors; AC industrial capacitors; Measuring instruments; Generators; Energy processing and control device; Railway signalling; Intelligent transportation system; Ticketing system
- Subsidiaries: Ducati Komponenti d.o.o. (Croatia - Ludbreg); Ducati Energia Romania s.a. (Romania - Busteni); Ducati Energia India Pvt. Ltd. (India - Pune); C.R.D. Centro Ricerche Ducati S.r.l. (Italy - Rovereto); Ducati Energia Sud America s.a. (Argentina - Buenos Aires)
- Website: www.ducatienergia.it

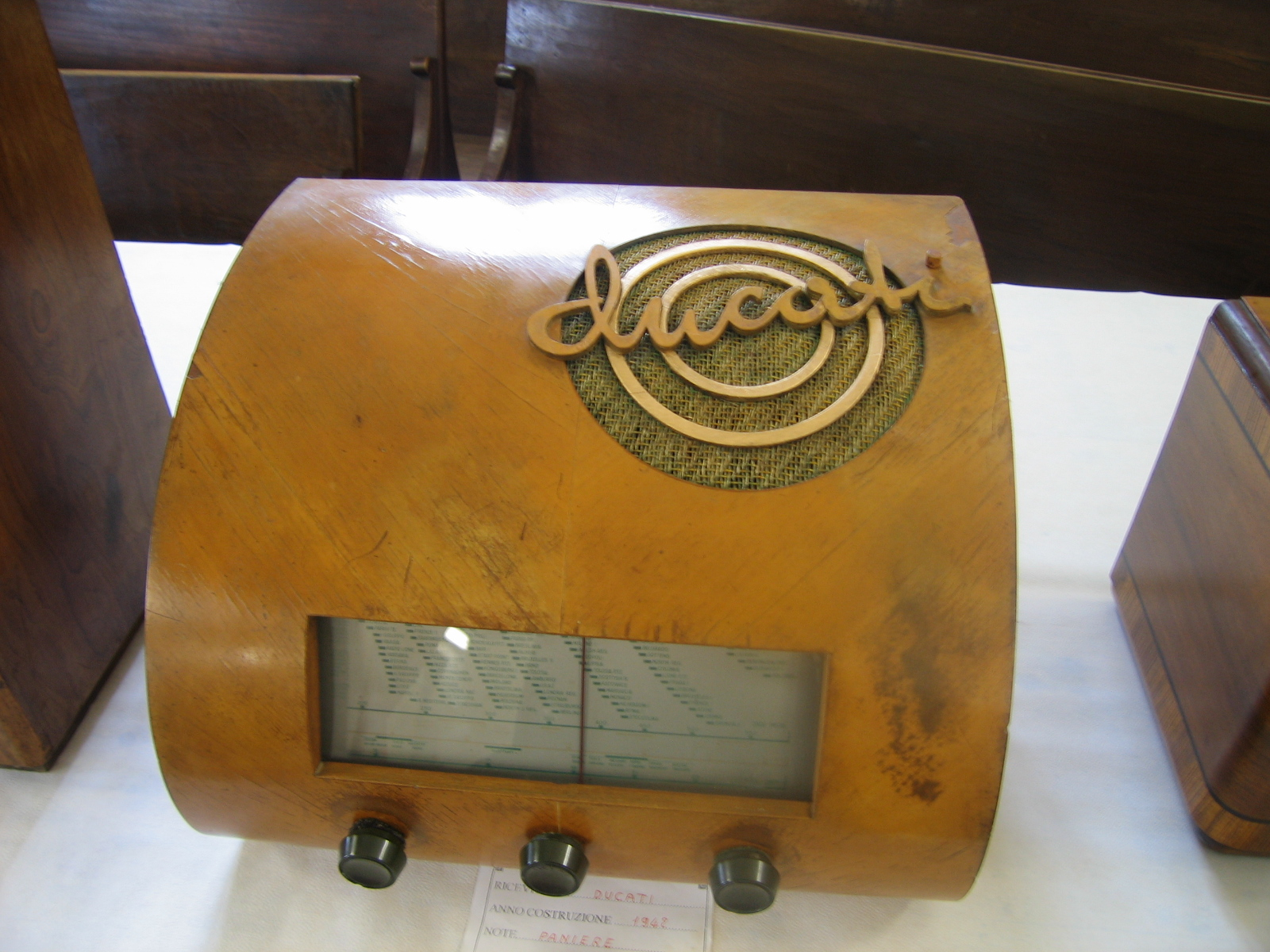
1942 Ducati radio

Ducati Energia S.p.A. is an Italian company based in Bologna that produces electrical and electronic components. It originated from the Ducati company and became independent of its motorcycle business after the split of Ducati into two companies.

It was founded in 1926 by the Ducati brothers, Adriano, Marcello and Bruno, to produce vacuum tubes, capacitors and other radio components. The original Ducati company was called Società Scientifica Radiobrevetti Ducati (SSR Ducati).

In 1935 Ducati became successful enough to enable construction of a new factory in the Borgo Panigale area of the city.

In the late 1940s Ducati began producing engines for bicycles and later motorcycles, leading to the later split into two companies: Ducati Meccanica and Ducati Elettrotecnica. The former specialised in the manufacture of motorcycles and the latter in radios and electrical devices and components.

Ducati Elettrotecnica was renamed Ducati Energia in the 1980s. It designs and produces a wide range of electronic components and subsystems for use in automotive, construction, security, and transmission and distribution (T&D) energy efficiency.

It has a presence in many countries in Europe, the Middle East, Asia, Africa and Latin America.

== Distinctions ==
In 2019 Ducati Energia was awarded the international prize "Leonardo The Immortal Light", conferred by the International Committee Leonardo da Vinci in recognition of its contribution to Italian industrial excellence.

== See also ==
- List of Italian companies
