= Katun (roller coaster) =

Amusement ride (debuted 2000)

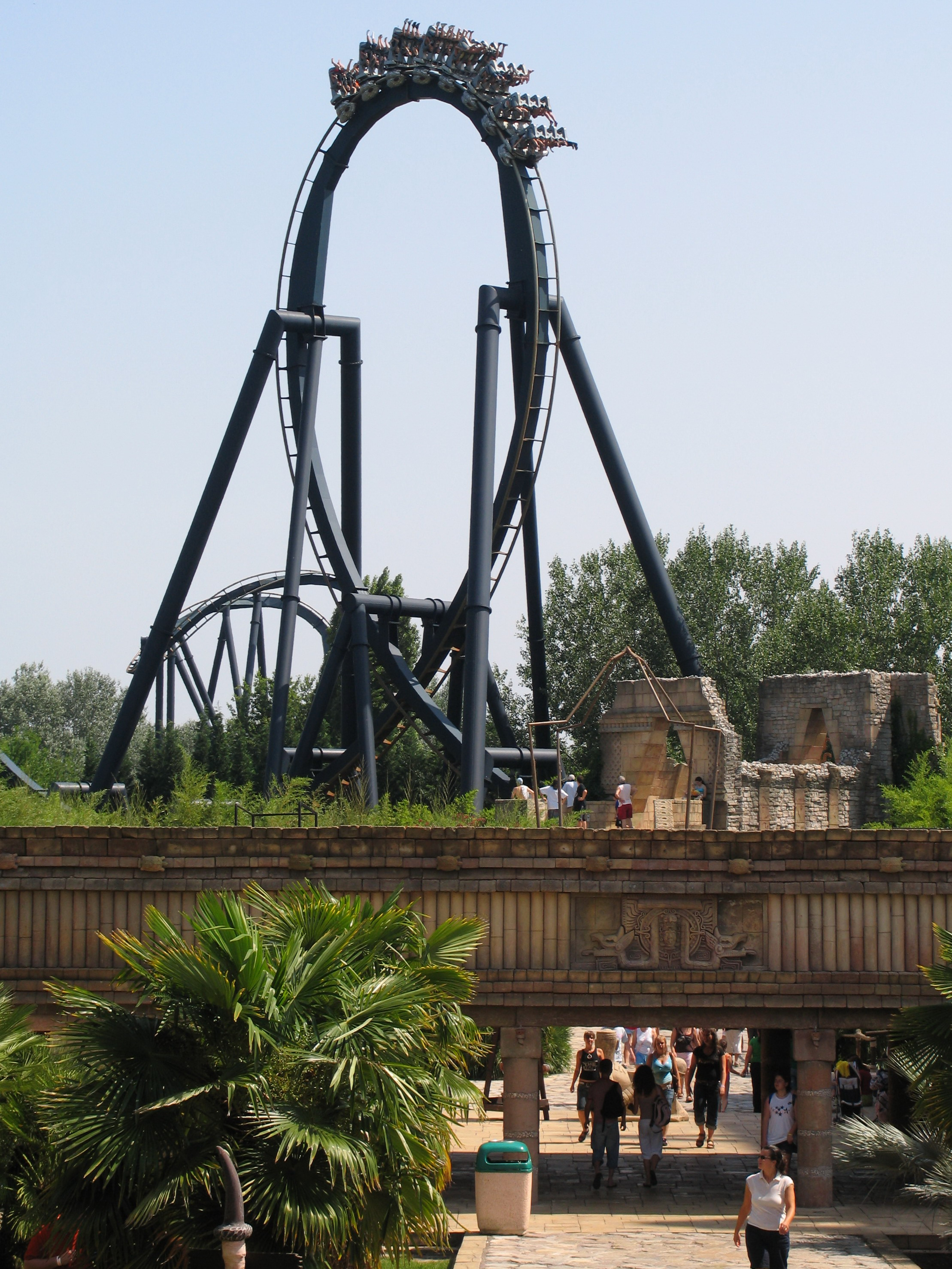

Mirabilandia
- Location: Mirabilandia
- Coordinates: 44.338288°N 12.266815°E
- Status: Operating
- Opening date: April 1, 2000

General statistics
- Type: Steel – Inverted
- Manufacturer: Bolliger & Mabillard
- Designer: Werner Stengel
- Model: Inverted Coaster
- Lift/launch system: Chain lift hill
- Height: 164.1 ft (50.0 m)
- Drop: 147.8 ft (45.0 m)
- Length: 3,937 ft (1,200 m)
- Speed: 65 mph (105 km/h)
- Inversions: 6
- Duration: 2:22
- Capacity: 1700 riders per hour
- G-force: 4
- Height restriction: 55 in (140 cm)
- Katun at RCDB

Katun is an inverted roller coaster at the Mirabilandia amusement park, Savio, outside Ravenna, Italy. It is the longest inverted roller coaster in Europe. The coaster has six inversions, a track length of 3,937 feet (1,200 meters), a top speed of 65 mph (105 km/h), and a height of 164 feet (50 meters), making it the fourth tallest complete circuit inverted coaster in the world.

== Ride experience ==
The arrangement of the track is comparable to Raptor at Cedar Point, but with larger elements. After departing the station, the train turns left on a carousel onto the 164-foot (50-meter) lift hill. The train swings to the left after rising the top of the lift hill and descends 147 feet (45 meters) into a vertical loop. The train continues to travel upwards and downwards into a highly banked speed curve to the right, which is followed by a zero-g roll. Immediately as the train exits the bend, it passes through a cobra roll, then an immense upward helix to the right, and finally the mid-course brake run. Following that, the train plunges into a corkscrew that travels into a tunnel after completing the mid-course brake run. After traversing a low to the ground helix and another corkscrew, the train leaves the tunnel and comes to a halt on its final brake run.

== Ride elements ==
- Vertical loop
- Zero G roll
- Cobra roll
- Two corkscrews after the block brake

== Theme ==
Katun has an ancient Mayan ruin theme. The two "Stargates" that riders travel through are immediately after they exit the station and right before they approach their final brake run.

A "Katun" is 7200 days, which is slightly less than 20 years in the Maya calendar.

== Accident and incidents ==
On August 18, 2007, a 28-year-old male from Morocco was killed when another passengers' legs struck him in the head. The man intended to retrieve his hat after he had lost it during a roller coaster ride, but he had passed a restricted area which was over two meters tall. He was struck at about 64 mph, oblivious that a train was approaching. The ride was shut down for a full day, and the girl whose leg impacted the man was injured. Upon investigation, it was determined that Mirabilandia's director was not guilty.

== Awards ==
Mitch Hawker's Best Roller Coaster Poll: Best steel-Tracked Roller Coaster
Year	2002	2003	2004	2005	2006	2007	2008	2009	2010	2011	2012
Ranking	28	25	22	5	5	5	9	8	9	No poll	9 (tie)
