= Adventure World (amusement park) =

Amusement park in Australia

- Previously known as Adventureworld at Bibra Lakes
- Interactive map of Adventure World
- Location: Perth, Western Australia, Australia
- Coordinates: 32°05′44″S 115°49′05″E
- Status: Operating
- Opened: 30 November 1982; 43 years ago
- Slogan: Have an AWesome Day.

Attractions
- Total: 36
- Roller coasters: 2
- Water rides: 16
- Website: adventureworld.net.au

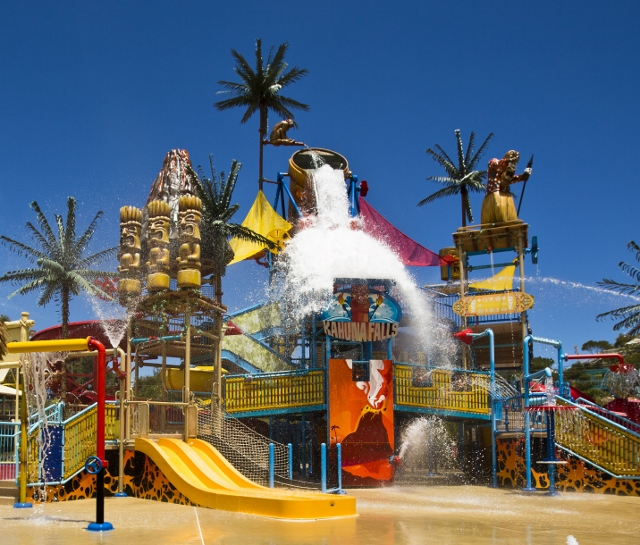
The Kahuna Falls water playground, which was the largest water playground in Australia at the time of launch

Adventure World is a theme park in Bibra Lake, a suburb of Perth, Western Australia. The park opened on 11 November 1982 as Adventureworld at Bibra Lakes, and is open annually from spring through autumn, for seven months, undergoing a winter closure each year. Adventure World is a 15-minute drive from Fremantle, and roughly 25 minutes from Perth city centre, located roughly 20 kilometres (12 mi) from the city’s main central business district. Being just 14.16 hectares (35.0 acres) in size, park management has enacted a self-imposed maximum capacity for daily visitors, varying slightly each season, though usually between 4,000 and 5,000 guests. When capacity is reached, the park’s gates will potentially close for safety and security reasons.

Adventure World was built on an old limestone quarry at Bibra Lake. 380,000 tonnes (840 million pounds) of sand were used to reshape the land for the initial landscape of the park before it opened, in 1982.

Adventure World has 25 different attractions, including Goliath (2017), the A$12–million Gerstlauer Euro-Fighter-model roller coaster Abyss (2013), and the A$7–million Kraken (the longest, tallest and steepest funnel waterslide of its kind), among others. Dragon’s Kingdom is a children’s play area with attractions for younger ages. There is also a Hawaiian-themed water playground, Kahuna Falls.

== Attractions ==
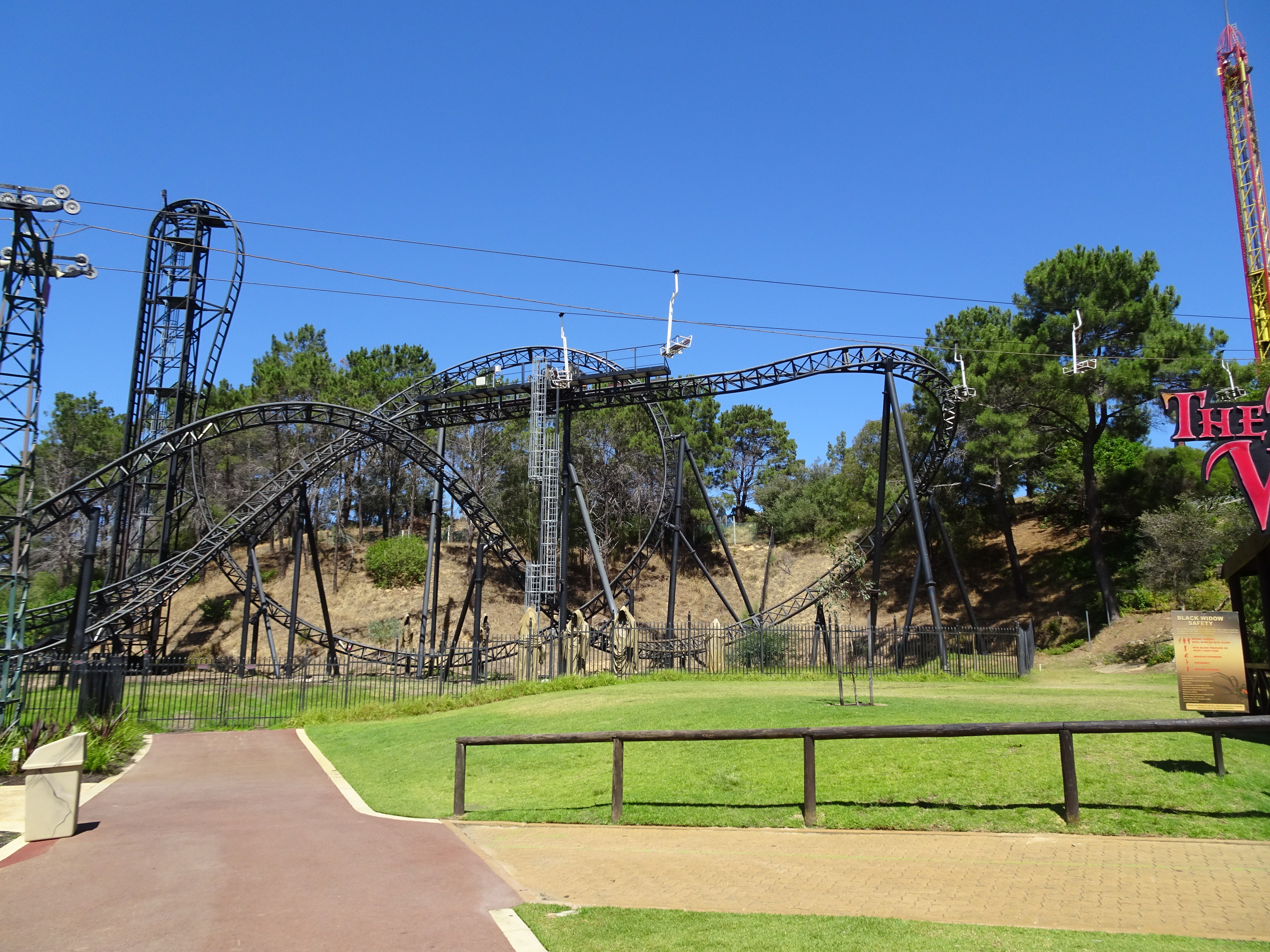
The Abyss roller coaster

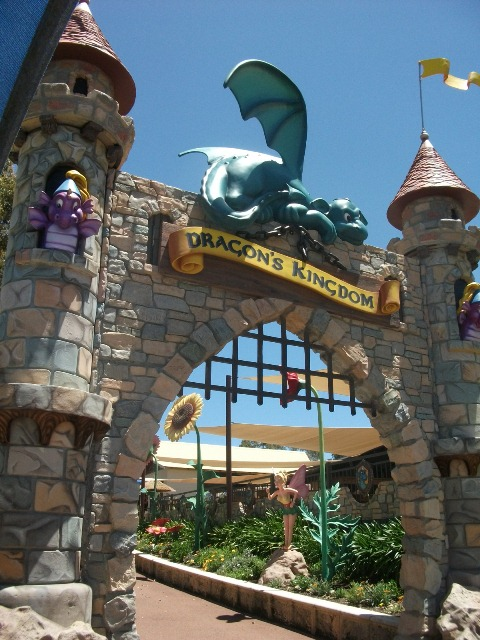
The entrance to Dragon's Kingdom

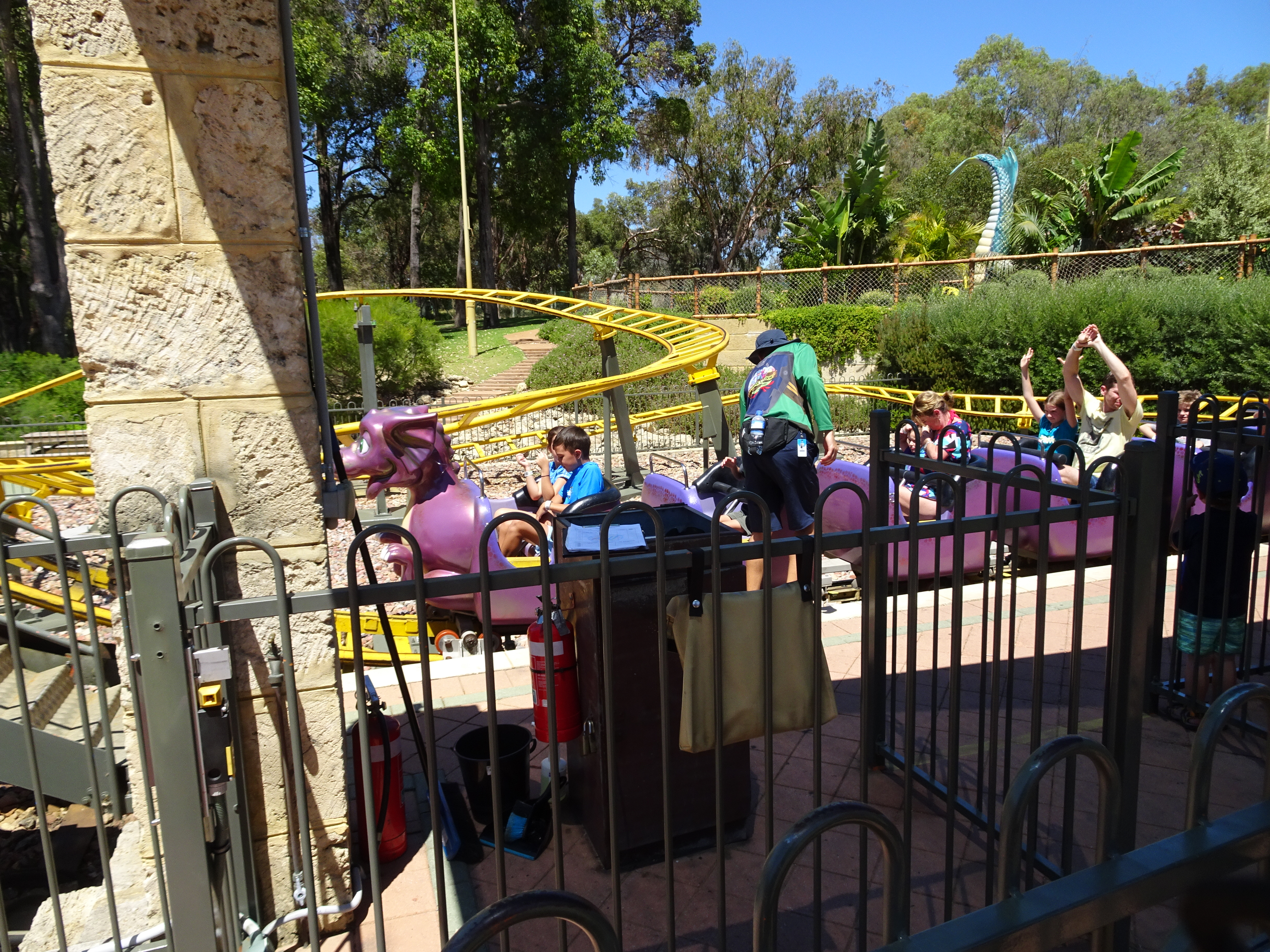
The Dragon Express roller coaster

The following is a list of the rides and attractions at Adventure World.

=== Current ===
- Dragon's Kingdom – A medieval children's section of the park. The section contains:
  - Kingdom Falls, a water play attraction
  - The Little Leaper, a Zamperla hopper
  - The Barnacle, a Zamperla Rockin Tug
  - Dragon Express, a steel roller coaster for kids
  - Dragon Flyer, a Zamperla fixed arm rotating ride
  - Yarli's Barrel Spin
  - Yarli's Safari
- Tidal Wave – a racing mat water slide
- Rail Rider – a single rail pedal attraction
- Grand Prix Raceway – a set of go karts
- Buccaneer Battle – a set of bumper boats
- Kahuna Falls – The largest water playground of its kind in Australia
- Rocky Rapids – a tube slide
- Mat Slides – a series of water slides where guests ride on mats
- Sea Serpents – a pair of dueling raft waterslides made by Australian Waterslides and Leisure
- Tunnel of Terror – a tandem tube slide
- Wahoo Speed Slides – a body slide
- The Lagoon – a large swimming pool
- Inferno – a HUSS Rides SHOT'N DROP, built on the old Turbo Mountain site
- The Black Widow – a Zamperla Power Surge
- Abyss – a $12 million Gerstlauer Euro-Fighter roller coaster, the single largest investment in the park's history
- Kraken – a $7 million Proslide Tornado 60 Waterslide (The world's longest and steepest Tornado waterslide)
- Goliath – a $7.5 million Intamin Gyro-Swing
- Bounty’s Revenge II – a reimagined HUSS pirate ship replacing the original ride of the same name which operated at the park until 2016.

=== Previous ===
- Bounty's Revenge – a swinging pirate ship
- Paddle Boats – a set of paddle boats
- Whistle Stop Train – a train
- Turbo Mountain – an Anton Schwarzkopf Jet Star II bought second hand from Luna Park Sydney. Closed in 2009 to make room for the Freefall.
- The Luge– a downhill sled on a concrete track.
- The Haunted Castle – selection of wax work figures on display
- The Rampage – a Moser Maverick 32
- Sky Lift – a chairlift
- Aussie Wildlife Experience – a zoo attraction that contains a range of Australian animals

== Future of the park ==
Adventure World announces a new major attraction typically every two seasons, though this is not guaranteed nor a policy. More recently, new attractions are codenamed "MI" (Major Impact) followed by a number (in sequential order).

== Food and beverage outlets ==
Adventure World has many food outlets. These are:

- Sweet Treats
- Surf Shack
- Kahuna Cafe
- Full of Beans
- Tiki Bar
