= ISpeed =

Roller coaster

iSpeed
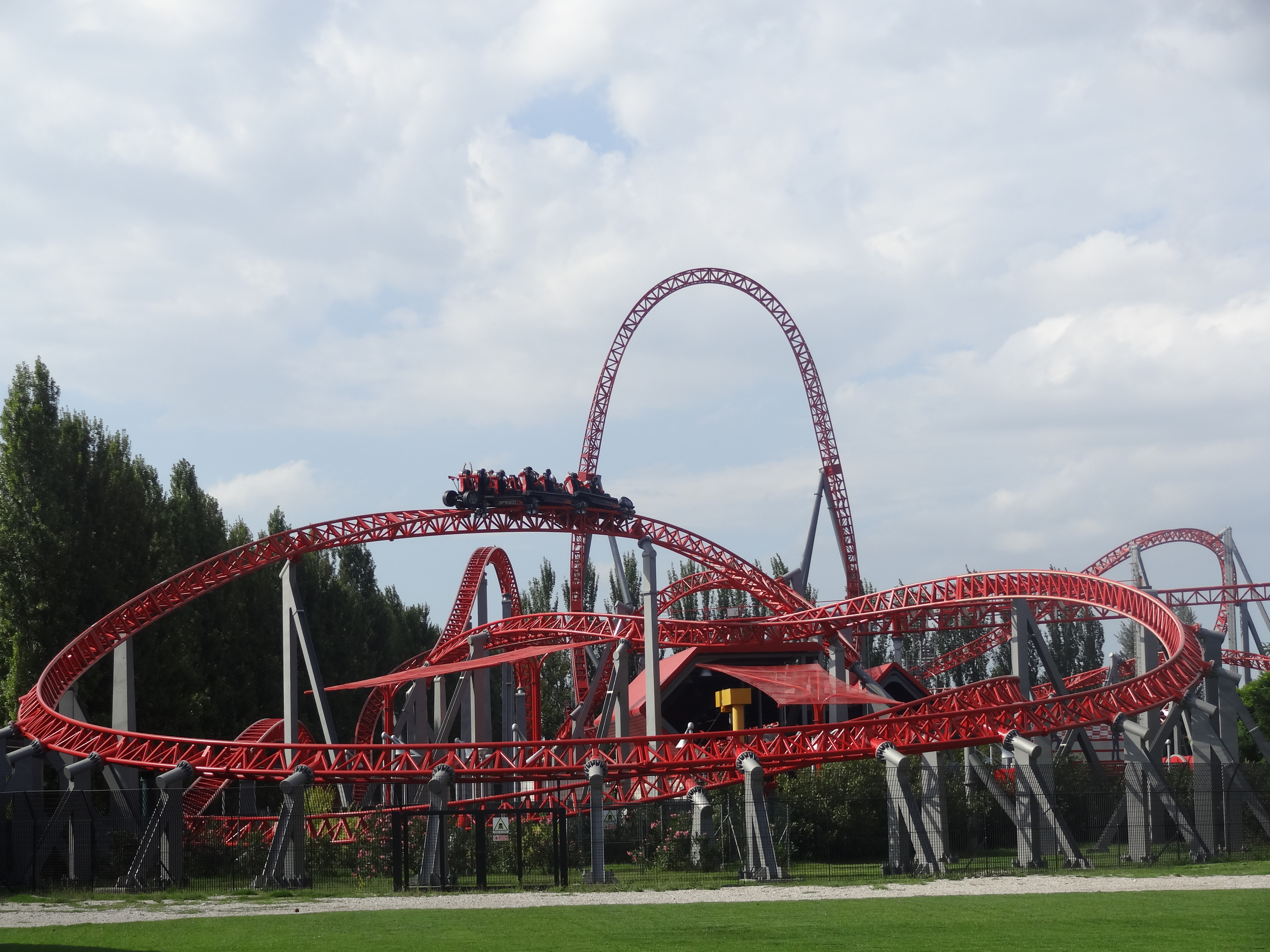

Mirabilandia
- Location: Mirabilandia
- Coordinates: 44°20′12″N 12°15′42″E
- Status: Operating
- Opening date: May 20, 2009
- Cost: €15,000,000
- Replaced: Sierra Tonante

General statistics
- Type: Steel – Launched
- Manufacturer: Intamin
- Designer: Werner Stengel
- Model: Blitz Coaster
- Track layout: Twister
- Lift/launch system: Linear synchronous motor Launch
- Height: 180 ft (55 m)
- Drop: 180.5 ft (55.0 m)
- Speed: 74.6 mph (120.1 km/h)
- Inversions: 2 (Corkscrew, Inline Twist)
- Duration: approx. 1 minute
- Max vertical angle: 90°
- Acceleration: 0 to 68 mph (0 to 109 km/h) in 2.2 seconds
- Height restriction: 55 in (140 cm)
- iSpeed at RCDB

iSpeed is a steel roller coaster at Mirabilandia in Italy. It opened on May 20, 2009, and is the second blitz coaster to be made by Intamin following Maverick at Cedar Point in Sandusky, Ohio.

== Background ==
The coaster is Italy's tallest and fastest launch coaster. The coaster starts with a 68 MPH launch in 2.2 seconds into a top hat where it climbs to 180 feet and then plummets to the ground. Following this is a barrage of airtime hills, tight turns, and inversions. The ride is open to passengers aged 12 and over.

In certain spots around the ride, copper alloy fins have been placed to create a magnetic field that regulates the coaster's speed.

In 2025, a 14-year-old child became seriously ill after riding iSpeed. The attraction was checked for maintenance and found to be in working order.
