= Ducati Sogno =

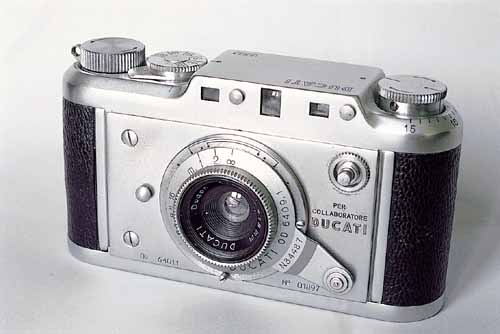
- Ducati Sogno

Overview
- Type: 35 mm half-frame rangefinder camera

Lens
- Lens mount: Bayonet
- F-numbers: 3.5

Sensor/medium
- Recording medium: 35 mm film

Focusing
- Focus: manual

Exposure/metering
- Exposure: manual

Shutter
- Shutter: focal-plane
- Shutter speeds: 1/20 to 1/500

General
- Made in: Bologna, Italy

The Ducati Sogno ("dream") was a half-frame 35 mm rangefinder camera made by Ducati in the 1950s at its Milan factory. The Sogno has been called a "miniature Leica" referring to its size and build quality; it is considerably smaller than a Leica III.

The Sogno is unusual for having its controls, including the shutter release, operated by the left hand. It produces an 18 mm x 24 mm image on standard 35 mm film loaded in a special cassette provided with the camera.
