= Vortex Aquatic Structures International =

Canadian splash pad & water slide manufacturer

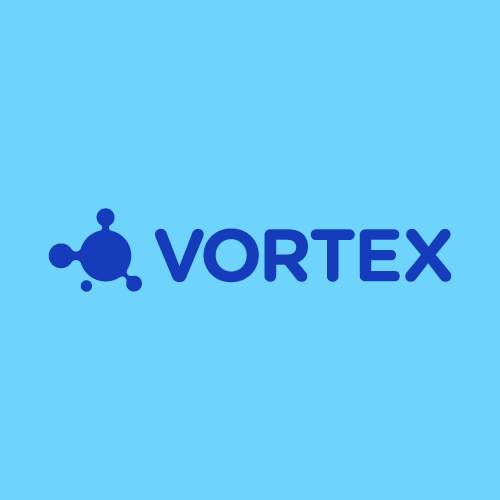
- Vortex International logo
- Company type: Private
- Industry: Manufacturing
- Founded: 1995
- Founder: Stephen Hamelin
- Headquarters: Montreal, Quebec, Canada
- Area served: Worldwide
- Products: Splash pad, Water slide, Elevations, water management, interactive play structures, playable fountains, lazy river
- Services: Park planning, Splash pad design, engineering, manufacturing, installation, service
- Number of employees: 200
- Website: www.vortex-intl.com

Vortex Aquatic Structures International is a Canadian splash pad and water slide manufacturer.

== Overview ==
Vortex Aquatic Structures International pioneered the first Splashpad. It is among the fastest-growing companies in Canada, making the Growth 500 list for the fifth consecutive year in 2019. Headquartered in Montreal, Vortex has regional offices in the United States and Europe.

== History ==
Vortex Aquatic Structures International was founded in 1995 in Montreal, Canada by Stephen Hamelin. In 2005, Virginie Guilbeault joined Vortex and later became Executive Vice-president in 2017.

Vortex entered the waterslide market in 2015 with the acquisition of North Carolina-based AquaBlue, a designer and manufacturer of waterslides.

In 2018, Vortex expanded its relationships with the Wanda Group, China's largest entertainment group. Together, they started a project of an interactive aquatic play structure for the waterpark component of Chongqing Wanda Cultural Tourism City. The same year, it partnered with Meliá Hotels International to provide water park play structures for the chain's new member-only destination in Punta Cana, the Dominican Republic.

In 2021, Vortex launched Dream Tunnel, the world's first fully immersive aquatic attraction at IAAPA Expo. In 2022, Vortex opened World's first Dream Tunnel at Super Aqua Club in Pointe-Calumet, Quebec, Canada.

Vortex hired François Lafortune in the newly created role of Chief Commercial Officer in November 2023.

In June 2024, Story Land theme park opened a new water attraction called "Moo Lagoon" which features a Splash pad and Elevations from Vortex.

Vortex announced in July 2024 that it acquired Watergames & More, a Dutch family-owned company specializing in water play experiences. This acquisition will bolster Vortex's manufacturing and service capabilities in Europe.

In January 2025 Vortex announced the expansion of its manufacturing capabilities in the United States with the acquisition of a 50,000 sq.ft. manufacturing and distribution facility in Plattsburgh, New York. The new facility will enhance Vortex's ability to meet growing customer demand across municipal and commercial markets in the United States.

== Awards ==
Vortex has won several awards, some of which are as follows,

- 2024, Vortex wins an MVP (Most Valuable Product) award from Aquatics International for CoolHub Abrio
- 2023, Vortex wins Leading Edge Award from the World Waterpark Association for Zephyr River, the world's first Dream Tunnel at Super Aqua Club (Quebec)
- 2023, Vortex wins Dream Design Award from Aquatics International for its contribution to Florida Aquatics Swimming Training
- 2023, Vortex wins an MVP (Most Valuable Product) award from Aquatics International for Glomist
- 2022, Vortex wins the 2022 IAAPA Brass Ring Award for the Dream Tunnel project at Super Aqua Club
- 2022, Vortex wins Dream Design Award from Aquatics International for its contribution to Linwood Park Spray Ground (Wichita, Kansas)
- 2021, Vortex wins Dream Design Award from Aquatics International for its contribution to St. James (Springfield, Virginia)
- 2020, Vortex wins Dream Design Award from Aquatics International for its contribution to Blue Ash Wading Pool (Ohio)
- 2019, Vortex receives a Leading-Edge Award from the World Waterpark Association for its design and contribution to The Wave Coventry (UK)
- 2019, Water Journey wins 4 International Design Awards (IDA)
- 2018, the Explora collection wins 2 International Design Awards (IDA)
- 2018, Chosen for Hotel Group Meliá Hotels International's new Circle resort in the Dominican Republic, featuring a water park outfitted by Vortex
- 2015, Good Design Award by the Chicago Athenaeum
