= Turbo Mountain =

Former Australian roller coaster

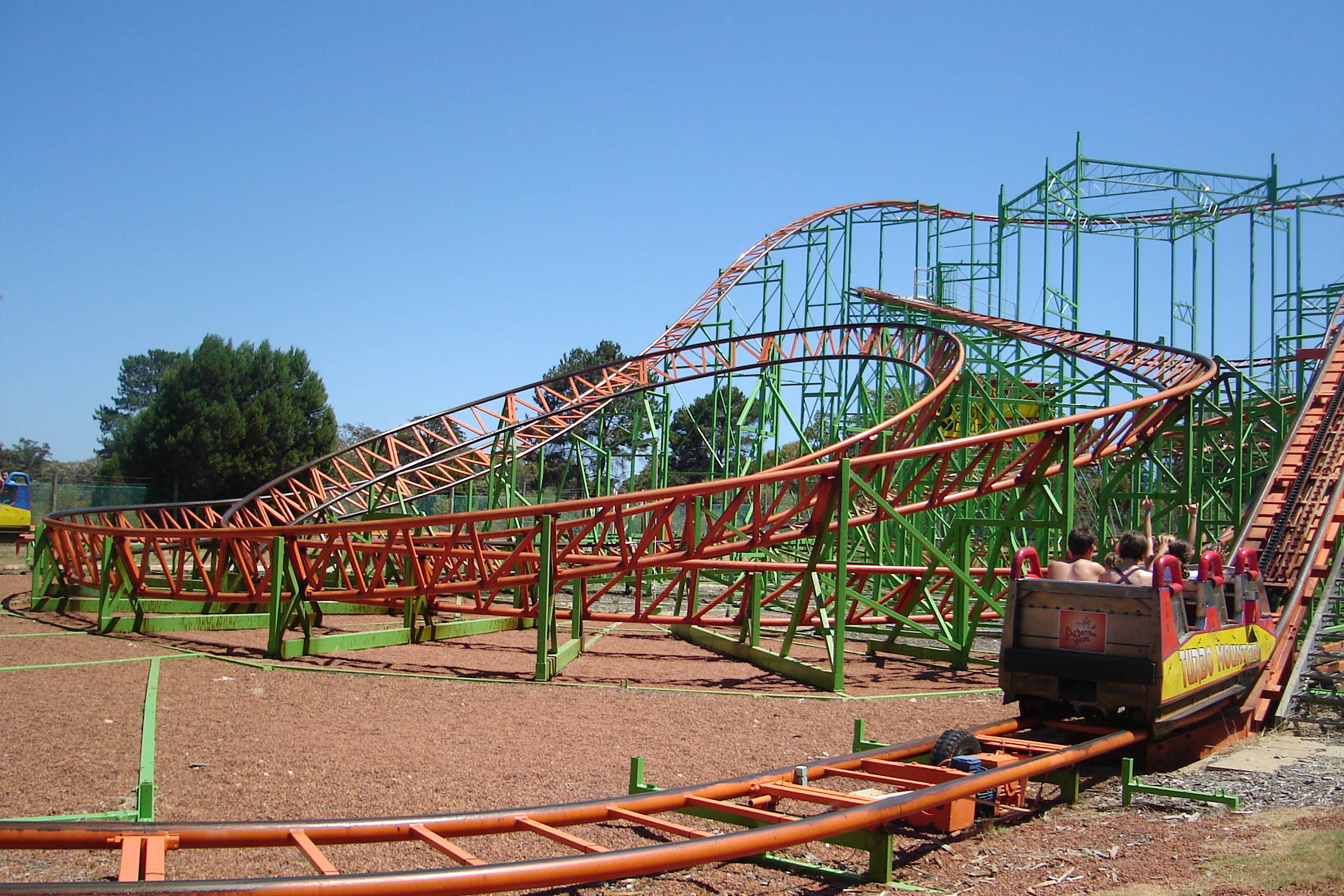

Adventure World
- Location: Adventure World
- Coordinates: 32.094757°S 115.816420°E
- Status: Removed
- Opening date: 1991
- Closing date: 2009
- Replaced by: Freefall

General statistics
- Type: Steel – Family
- Manufacturer: Anton Schwarzkopf
- Designer: Ing.-Büro Stengel GmbH
- Model: Custom Jet Star 2
- Lift/launch system: Chain lift hill
- Height: 12 m (39 ft)
- Length: 420 m (1,380 ft)
- Speed: 57 km/h (35 mph)
- Inversions: 0
- Capacity: 480 riders per hour
- Trains: a single car. Riders are arranged 2 across in 3 rows for a total of 6 riders per train.
- Turbo Mountain at RCDB

Turbo Mountain was a steel roller coaster at Adventure World in Perth, Western Australia, Australia. The ride was closed and removed in 2009 to make room for a HUSS Shot'N Drop tower named Freefall. The ride was originally located in Luna Park Sydney as a standard Schwarzkopf Jet Star 2 bought second hand. When the ride was moved to Adventure World in 1991, the ride's lift hill was modified from a spiral lift hill to a standard chain lift hill due to maintenance.

== See also ==
- Abyss (roller coaster)
- Dragon Express
