= Splash pad =

Area for water play that has little or no standing water

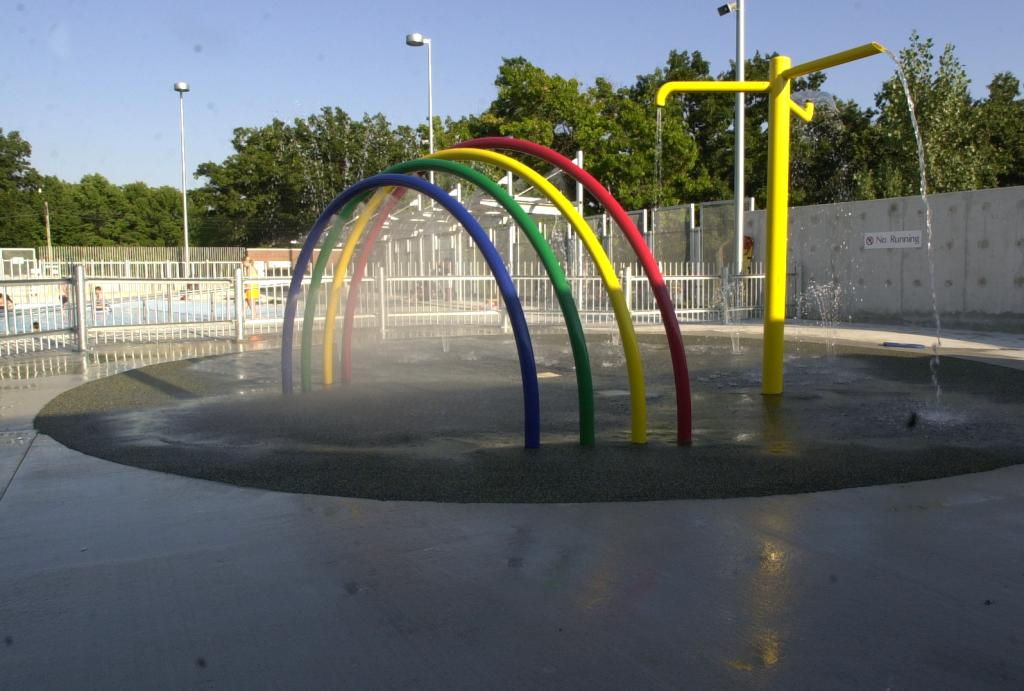
Urban beach style splash pad located within the municipal swimming baths of Toronto's High Park

A splash pad or spray pool is a recreation area, often in a public park, for water play that has little or no standing water. This is said to eliminate the need for lifeguards or other supervision, as there is little risk of drowning.

Typically there are ground nozzles that spray water upwards out of the splash pad's raindeck. There may also be other water features such as a rainbow (semicircular pipe shower), or mushroom- or tree-shaped showers. Some splash pads feature movable nozzles similar to those found on fire trucks to allow users to spray others. The showers and ground nozzles are often controlled by a hand activated-motion sensor, to run for limited time.

Typically the water is either freshwater, or recycled and treated water, that is typically treated to at least the same level of quality as swimming pool water standards. These splash pads are often surfaced in textured non-slip concrete or in crumb rubber.

== Definitions ==
A typical definition was laid out by a 1986 Health Act in British Columbia which stated that a spray pool is "an artificially constructed depression or basin for use by children, into which potable water is sprayed but not allowed to accumulate in the bottom."

Similarly, the city of Norfolk, Virginia, specifically defines a spray pool as "any shallow manmade structure constructed from materials other than natural earth or soil used for spraying humans with water and which has a drainage area designated to remove the water from the shower or spray nozzles at a rate sufficient to prevent the impounding of water."

Spray pool features may also be referred to as "interactive fountains" or "wet decks".

=== Splash fountains ===
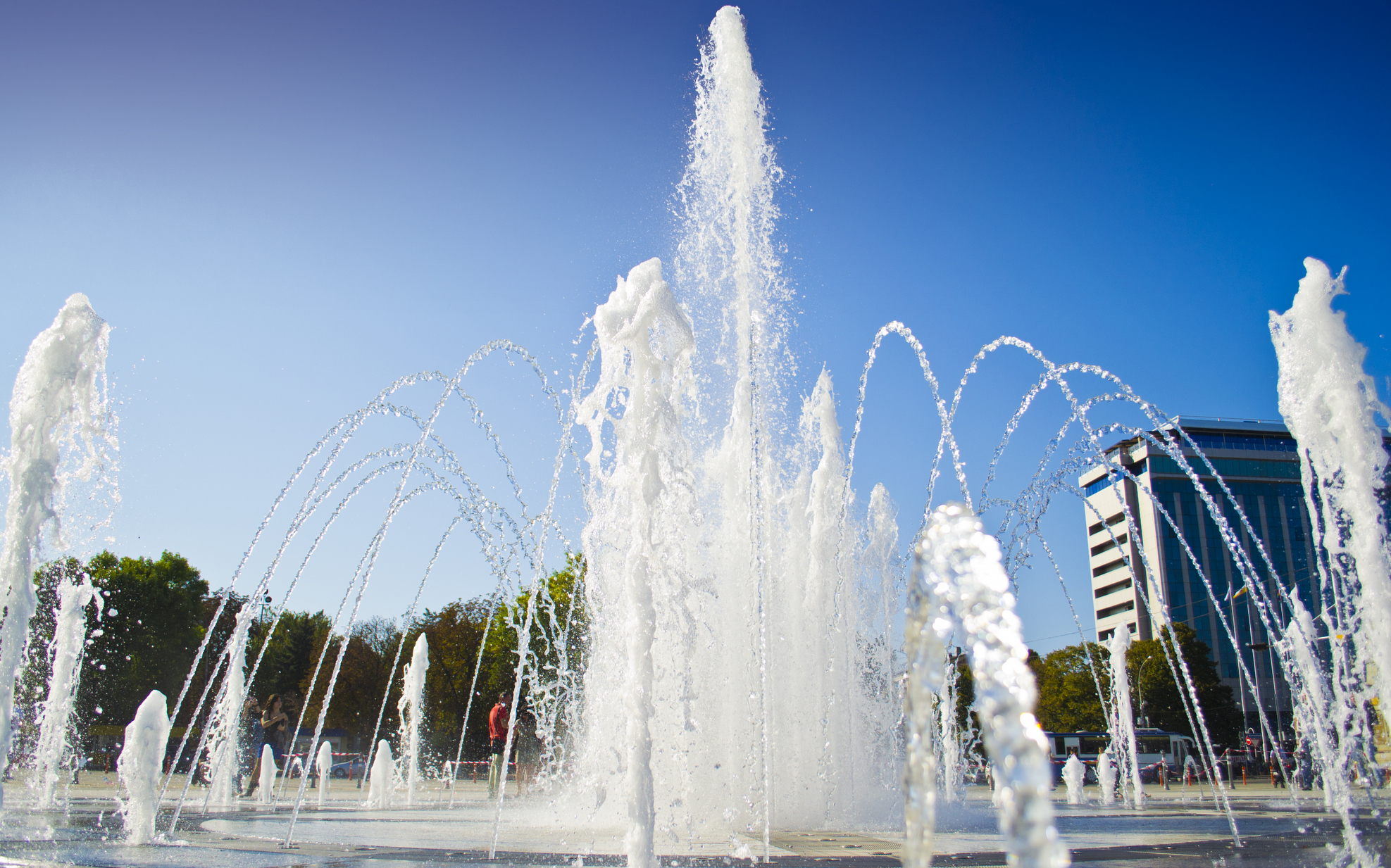
The Splash Fountain in Krasnodar, Russia, the largest splash fountain in Europe

Splash fountains, unlike splash pads, encourage use from people of all ages. These fountains are usually designed to be both visually appealing (from a distance) and also interactive. As such, they are designed to allow easy access, often at ground level. They tend to feature nonslip surfaces, and have no standing water, to eliminate possible drowning hazards, so that no lifeguards are required. Multiple fountains may start and stop in unison or according to a pattern for artistic effect. While they may be placed in public parks like children's splash pads, splash fountains are also likely to be placed in public squares or at urban beaches.

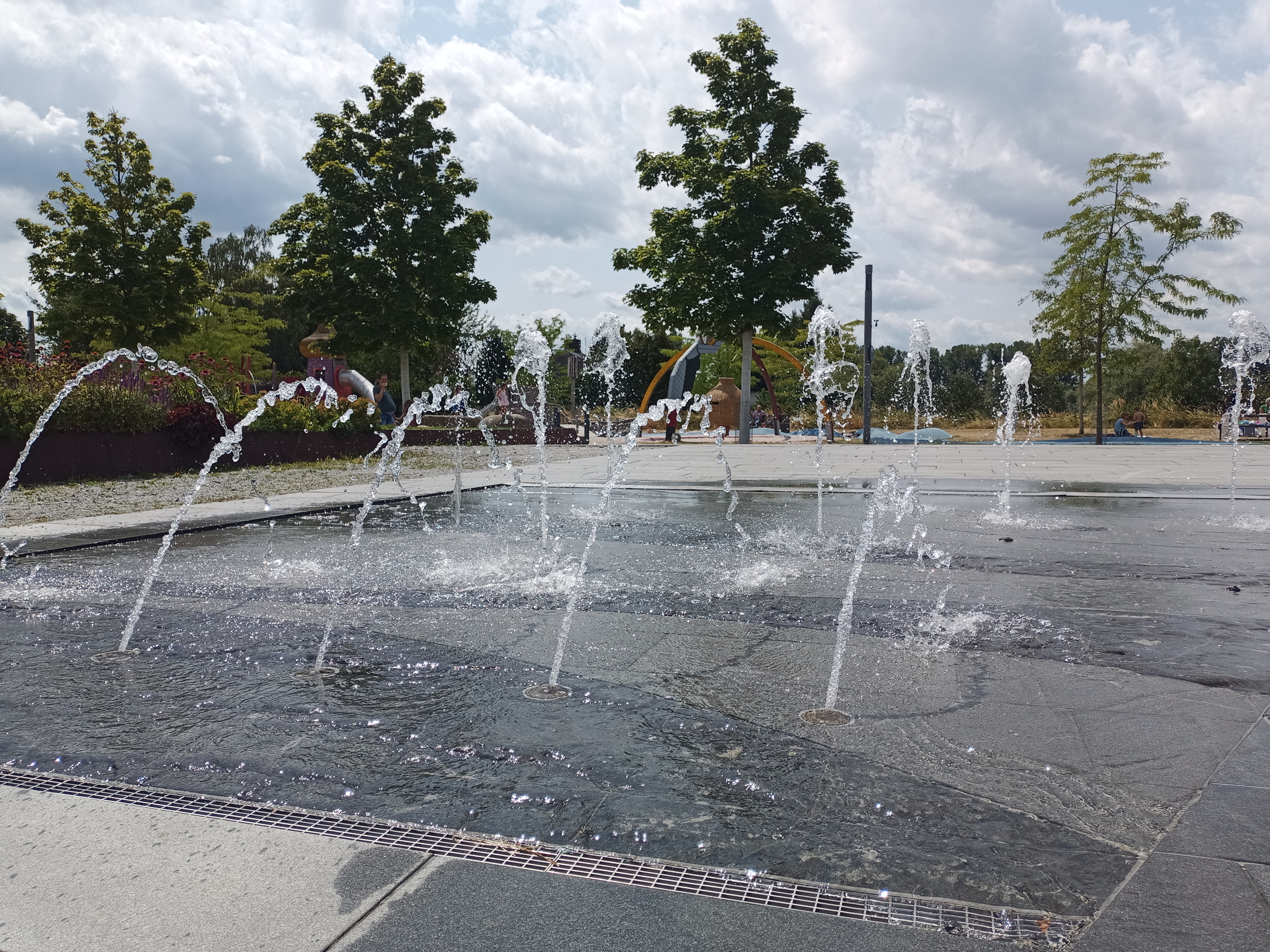
splash pad.

== Popularity ==
Popular in summertime and especially prevalent in urban areas, the spray pool offers an alternative to the practice of opening fire hydrants so that children can play and cool off in the water – a practice which is illegal and has been cited as dangerous in that it lowers the water pressure in a given area and makes firefighting more difficult. A spray pool does not need to be staffed by qualified lifeguards.

== Common features ==
=== Spray force ===
Depending upon the strength and arc of the flow, the force of the spray can be relatively strong (especially close to the point where the water emerges) or may have more resemblance to rainfall or even a fine mist. Many splash pads have some features such as fine mist, that are designed to be moderate enough for children. Other splash fountains are designed for adults, e.g. for joggers or concert goers to cool off in.

=== Drainage ===
The area beneath a spray pool typically has drain openings so that the water it produces will not flood the surrounding landscape. In some instances, the water collected in these drains is recycled back into the spray mechanism, thereby conserving water. Alternatively, the water emanating from the spray nozzles may be continually drawn from a fresh water supply.

== Special features ==
=== Hydraulophones ===
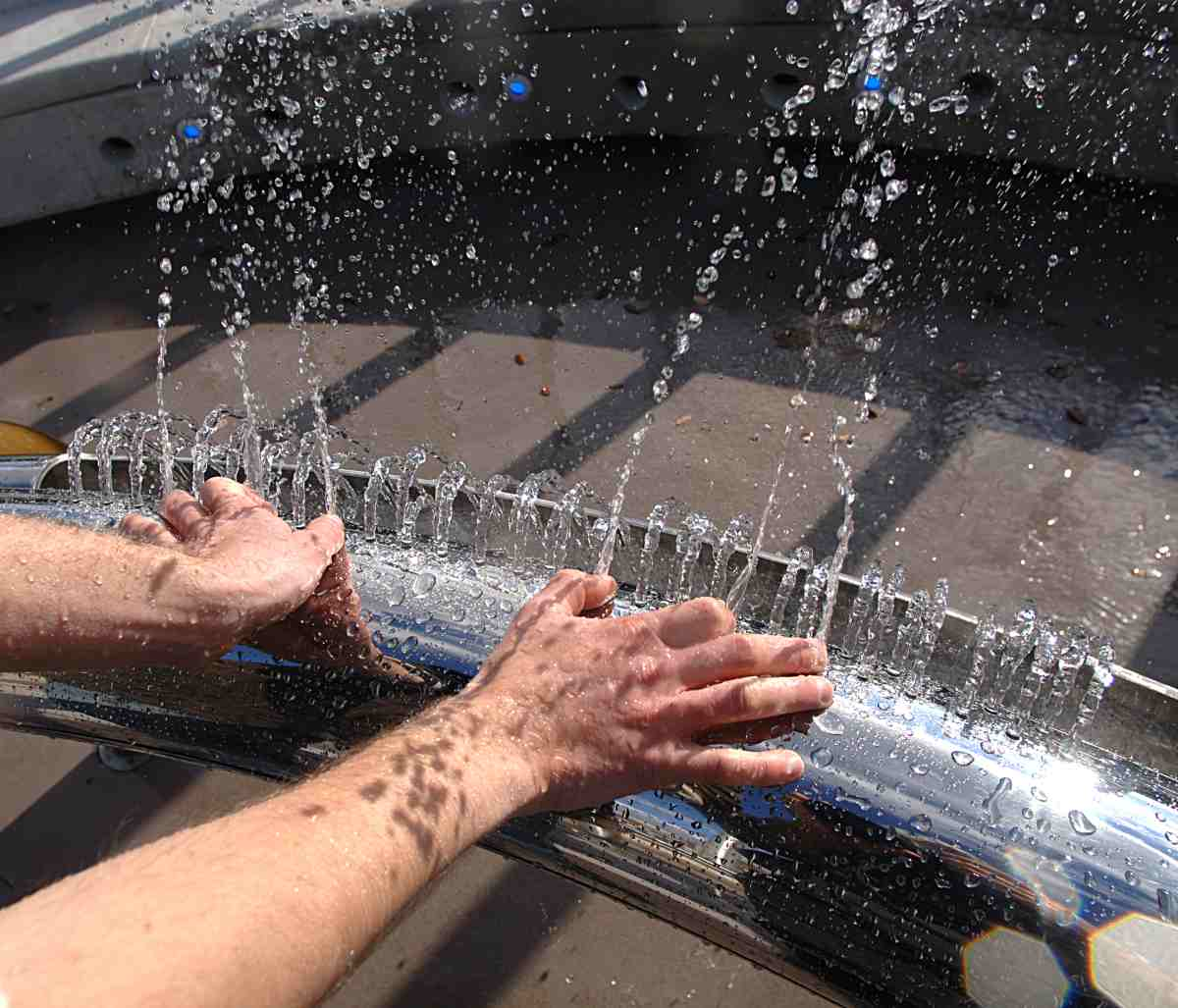
One of the features of the circular splash pad in front of the Ontario Science Centre is a hydraulophone flute with 45 finger holes. Here a hydraulist demonstrates hydraulophone technique.

Hydraulophones are the world's first musical instrument that makes music from vibrations in water. By pressing on jets of water laid out to a musical scale, hydraulophones make a unique sound. Hydraulophones have been installed in water parks, museums, and science centres around the world, including the Legoland California Resort, Chicago Children's Museum, and the Ontario Science Centre in Toronto.

=== Heating ===
At the splash fountain at Dundas Square in Toronto, Ontario, the water is heated by solar energy captured by special dark-colored granite slabs.

== Safety ==
Inadequately treated, recirculated spray pool systems present a health hazard. In certain jurisdictions, splash pads may not be subject to public swimming pool water quality requirements because they do not contain standing water. People wearing regular clothing and street shoes, pets and young children may introduce pathogens into the spray pool when they cool off in it.

Outbreaks of cryptosporidiosis associated with water parks have occurred in Florida in 1999, in New York in 2005 and in Idaho in 2007.

Since 2021 there have been 3 child deaths from primary amoebic meningoencephalitis (PAM) caused by the amoeba Naegleria fowleri contracted from exposure to inadequately disinfected water in splash pads, two in Texas and one in Arkansas.

== Examples ==
Placement and management of spray pools varies according to the municipality in which they are located. For example:

- On Boston Common, the so-called "Frog Pond" (which is a public ice-skating rink in winter) becomes a spray pool for children in the summer. The facility is managed by the Boston Common Frog Pond Foundation and staffed by youth workers from the Boston Youth Fund.
- The spray pool at Phillips Park in Aurora, Illinois, dates from the 1930s and has closed and reopened several times. It is now part of the Phillips Park Family Aquatic Center next to the Phillips Park Zoo.
- Seattle & King County, Washington, has a "Plan Guide for Water Recreation Facilities – Spray Pools" listing very specific considerations such as the use of non-slip surfaces and the positioning of the spray pools so as to "minimize pollution by dust, smoke, soot and other undesirable substances."
- Oregon City, Oregon, has a spray pool at the Oregon City Carnegie Center. Formerly run by the city, the center and its programs recently reopened under the auspices of a private organization called Fine Art Smarts.
- North Berwyn Park District in Berwyn, Illinois, offers a permit for the use of a city-owned community center and spray pool for birthday parties.

== See also ==
- Water park
- Vortex Aquatic Structures International
