= Wet 'n Wild =

Wet 'n Wild, Wet'n'Wild, Wet N Wild (or other variation) appears in the names of a variety of brands, particularly water parks, around the world, including:

- Wet 'n Wild (brand)
  - Wet 'n Wild Emerald Pointe, a water park in Greensboro, North Carolina, United States
  - Wet 'n Wild (Las Vegas), former water park in Winchester, Nevada
  - Wet 'n Wild Orlando, former water park in Orlando, Florida, United States
  - Wet 'n Wild São Paulo, a water park in São Paulo, Brazil
- Wet'n'Wild (brand)
  - Wet'n'Wild Gold Coast, a water park on the Gold Coast, Australia
  - Wet‘n’Wild Haikou, a water park Haikou, Hainan, China
  - Wet'n'Wild Hawaii, a water park in Kapolei, Hawaii, United States
  - Wet'n'Wild Toronto, a water park in Brampton, Ontario, Canada
- Standalone locations
  - Wet 'n' Wild Waterworld, a water park in Anthony, Texas
  - Wet N Wild (North Shields), a water park in North Shields, United Kingdom (closed 2013, reopened August 2014, closed 2020)
