= Sydney Action Park =

Water park in Sydney

- Interactive map of Sydney Action Park
- Slogan: Let the action begin!
- Location: Prospect, New South Wales, Australia
- Coordinates: 33°48′31.64″S 150°54′39.92″E
- Owner: Jim Eddy
- Operated by: Jamberoo Action Park
- Opened: 12 December 2013; 12 years ago
- Previous names: Wet'n'Wild Sydney (2013–2018); Raging Waters Sydney (2018–2026)
- Operating season: 28 September 2026 – 2 May 2027
- Area: 25 ha (62 acres)
- Pools: 4 pools
- Water slides: 42 water slides
- Children's areas: A single children's area
- Website: sydneyactionpark.com.au

Sydney Action Park is a 25 ha (62 acres) water park located in Prospect, New South Wales, Australia. The park opened on 12 December 2013 as Wet’n Wild Sydney which was the third Wet'n'Wild water park opened and operated by Village Roadshow Theme Parks, after locations on the Gold Coast and Las Vegas. On 2 July 2018, it was announced that the park had been acquired by Parques Reunidos who renamed the park Raging Waters Sydney for the 2019 season. On 15 June 2026, it was announced that the park had been acquired by Jamberoo Action Park, who renamed the park Sydney Action Park for the 2027 season.

== History ==
=== 2010–2013: Set-up and opening ===
On 11 September 2010, New South Wales Premier Kristina Keneally and Village Roadshow Theme Parks' CEO Tim Fisher announced Sydney's newest water park which would be opened as Wet'n'Wild Sydney. The proposal detailed a 25-hectare (62-acre) water park in Prospect, New South Wales that was set to be one of the top ten water parks in the world.

In a master plan created by Canadian water slide manufacturer, WhiteWater West, Wet'n'Wild Sydney was set to play host to a variety of attractions including two wave pools, two lazy rivers, a children's AquaPlay area, spas and volleyball courts. These ground-level attractions would be coupled by several slide towers featuring a variety of water slides including two AquaLoops, a Boomerango, dueling Master Blasters, a Super Bowl, an Abyss, a six-lane Whizzard, two family raft rides, and a collection of inline tube slides. The whole park was set to cost A$80 million, have a seasonal attendance of over one million visitors, and have a turnover of A$500 million in the first decade of operation.

The commencement of construction was announced by New South Wales Premier, Barry O'Farrell, and Wet'n'Wild Sydney General Manager, Chris Warhurst, on 9 September 2012. The announcement detailed Village Roadshow would now be investing $115 million into the park ahead of its planned opening in late 2013. Plans for the $115 million park were designed by Water Technology Inc. On 12 December 2013, the park officially opened to the public, after several days of soft openings.

The water park was forced to cancel its 2013 New Year's Eve Festival with just six hours' notice due to "a major technical production issue". The event, which was expected to sell out, was promoted as Australia's "first ever music festival to be held at a water theme park". Village Roadshow later stated that the organiser's "management plan for crowd control and safety failed to meet Wet'n'Wild's standards". The event was later moved to Australia Day.

== Attractions ==
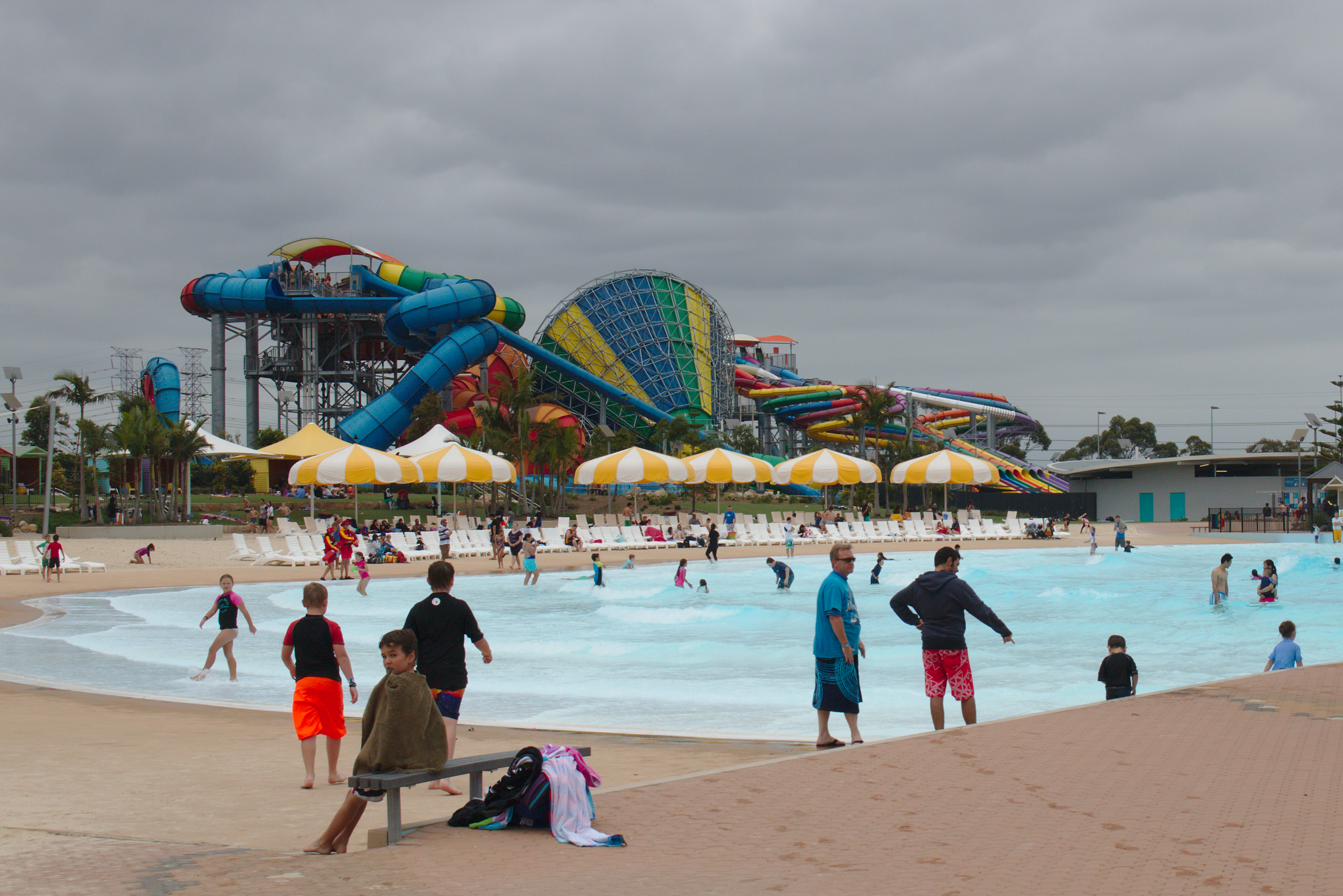
View of the artificial beach (The Beach)

Sydney Action Park features several water slide attractions; a large wave pool; a children's area; food, beverage and retail outlets; and a Surf Life Saving Club. The park features four water slide towers, each featuring a collection of slides grouped by the level of thrill. The park is centred around a large wave pool known as The Beach. The Beach was designed by an Australian company and is capable of producing (non-surfable) waves of up to 2.3 metres (7.5 ft).

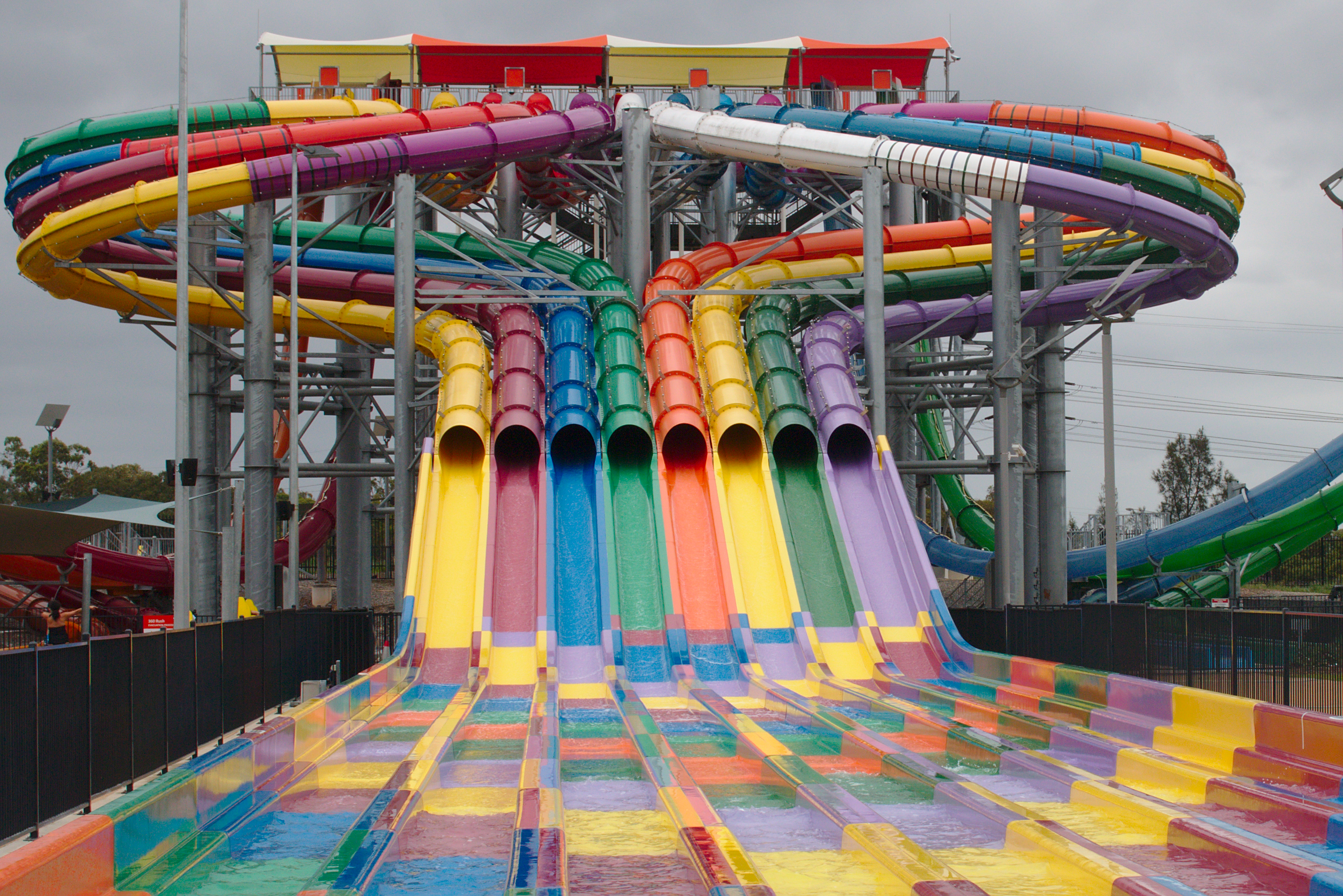
View of H2Go racers and 360Rush (Tower 1)

Tower one is located adjacent to the first, and contains two slides manufactured by WhiteWater West: H2Go Racer and 360Rush. H2Go Racer is an eight-lane Whizzard Twist where riders race head-first on a mat down the slide to the runout chutes. Riders begin by entering an enclosed tube section where the individual lanes are braided. The lanes then enter a 360-degree helix, before emerging for a final open drop. The second ride is the 360Rush, a pair of AquaLoop looping water slides, featuring a trap door release with 3G acceleration and a top speed of 60 kilometres per hour (37 mph). A new slide, Whirlwind, opened for the 2019–20 season, replacing a second pair of 360 Rush slides.

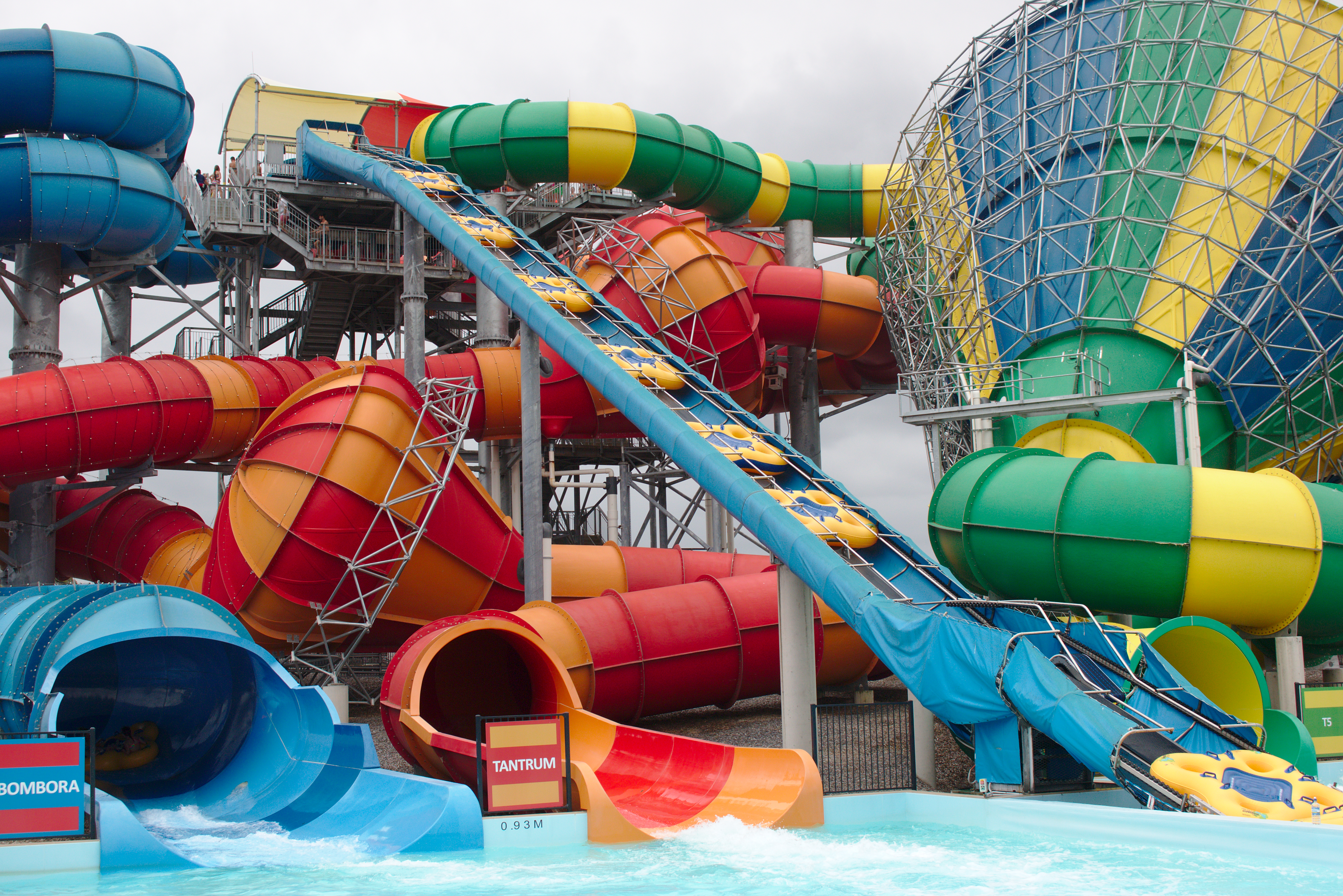
View of Bombora, Tantrum and T5 (Tower 2)

To the left of the park entrance tower two, containing three slides by ProSlide Technology: Bombora, Tantrum and T5. All of the slides use four-person cloverleaf-shaped rafts. Bombora is a Tornado Wave slide where riders are taken on an enclosed flume ride before dropping down to the ground and riding up a large wave-shaped surface. Here, riders experience a feeling of weightlessness. The second slide is the T5, a ProSlide Tornado 60. The ride is characterised by a large funnel, 60 feet (18 m) in diameter, in which riders oscillate back and forth. Both before and after the main funnel element, riders navigate through enclosed flume segments. The final slide on this tower is Tantrum, a ProSlide Tornado 24. Tantrum features three enclosed funnels, each with a diameter of 24 feet (7.3 m), similar to the single larger funnel on the T5. Several enclosed flume segments link the three funnels, leading the ride to the shared splashdown pool.

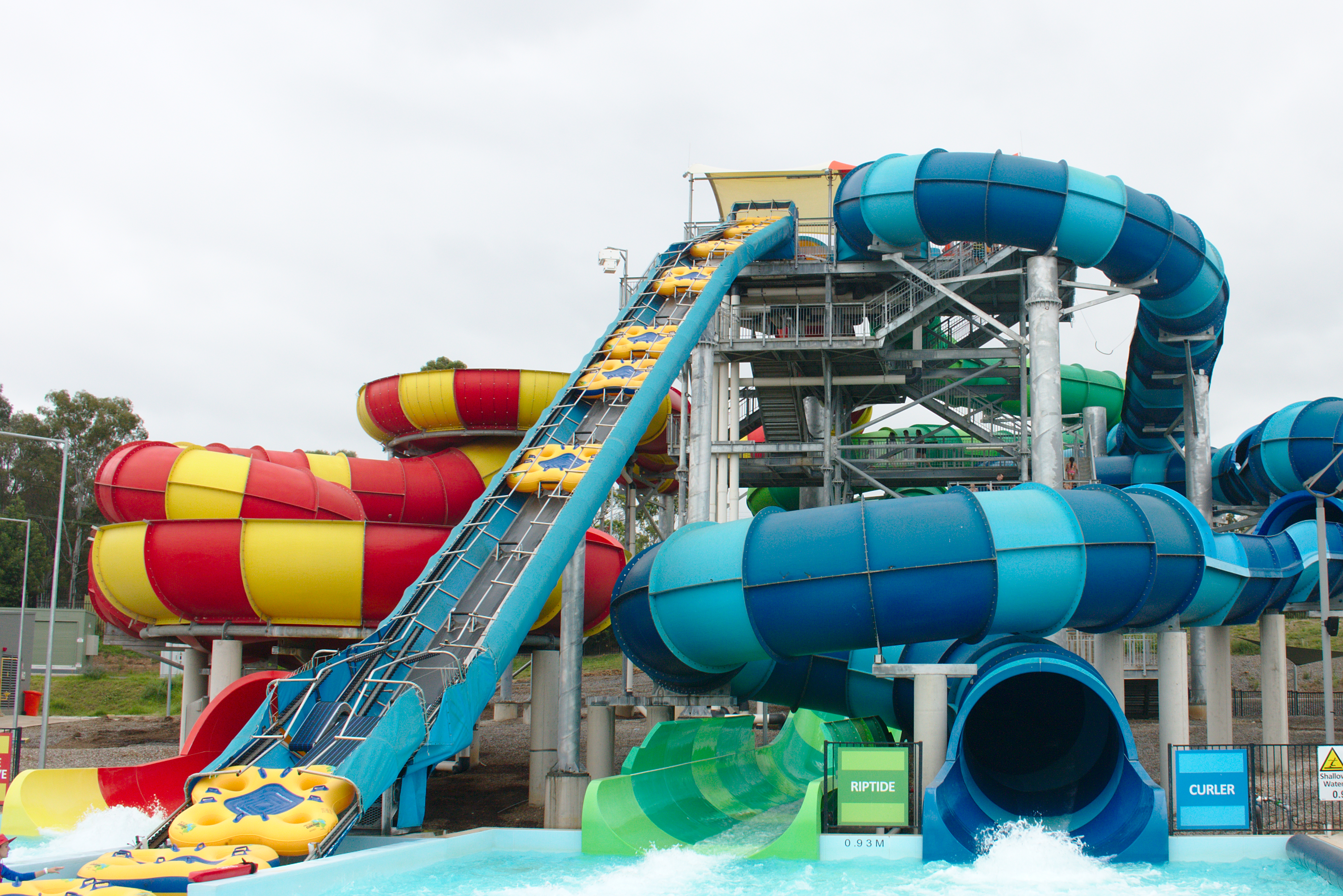
View of DoubleBOWLSeye, Riptide and Curler (Tower 3)

On the other side of The Beach is tower three, was manufactured by ProSlide Technology and features three slides: Double Bowlseye, The Curler and Riptide. The tower is located near the front of the park. They used round rafts that can seat between four and five people, but they kept getting stuck in the river, so they have been replaced by Cloverleaf rafts that seat only 4 people. Double Bowlseye is a Behemoth Bowl 40 where riders descend a dark tunnel before entering two large, open bowls. The raft circles the centre of the bowls before exiting down through the centre and into another flume channel. The Curler and Riptide are two Mammoth slides. The Curler is characterised by enclosed twists and turns,rns while Riptide features a large open-air double drop to conclude the ride.

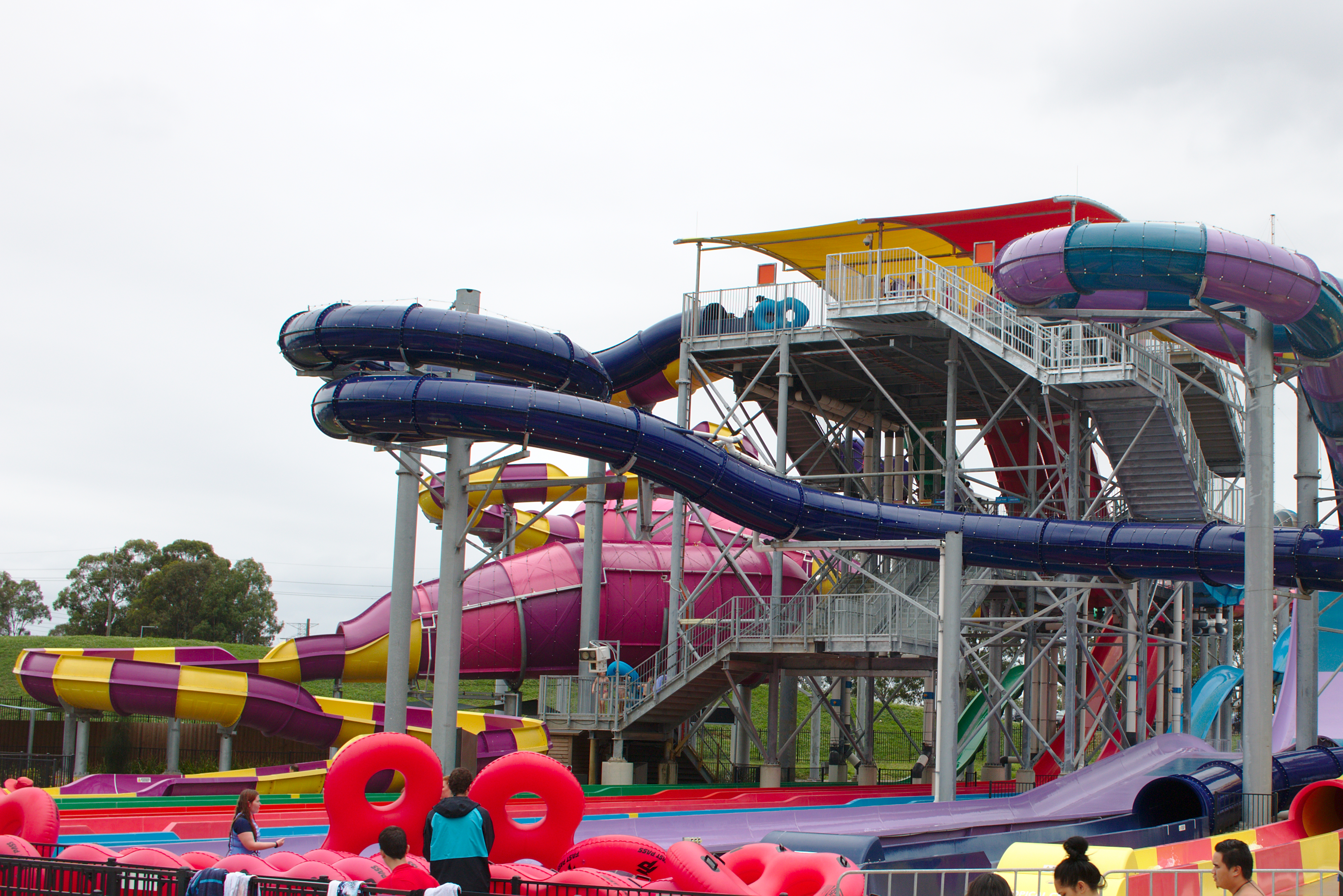
View of Typhoon, The Breakers, Half Pipe, Aqua Tube, and Tropical Cyclone (Tower 4)

The final tower, tower four, featuring five slides also by WhiteWater West: Half Pipe, Typhoon, Tropical Cyclone, The Breakers, and AquaTube. All slides but one on this tower use two-person inline tubes, the exception being typhoon, which uses a four-person raft. Half Pipe is a Boomerango of a similar design to Bombora; however, the exit chute from the vertical wall features a small camel hump for a second moment of weightlessness. Typhoon is a Rattler where riders slide down open flume sections before entering two cylinders at right angles. Riders oscillate back and forth inside the cylinders before emerging and continuing with the open slide. Tropical Cyclone is a Constrictor, a slide characterised by three wide helices. Internally, these helices measure 2.1 metres (6.9 ft) in diameter as opposed to the 1.3-metre-diameter (4.3 ft) helices evidenced in the rest of the slide. The Breakers are a set of four Master Blaster slides. These slides mimic roller coasters by providing not only descents, but ascents as well. Ascents are achieved through water jets blasting the raft uphill. AquaTube is a traditional flume ride that features enclosed twists and turns in complete darkness. The ride is a Giant AquaTube by WhiteWater West.

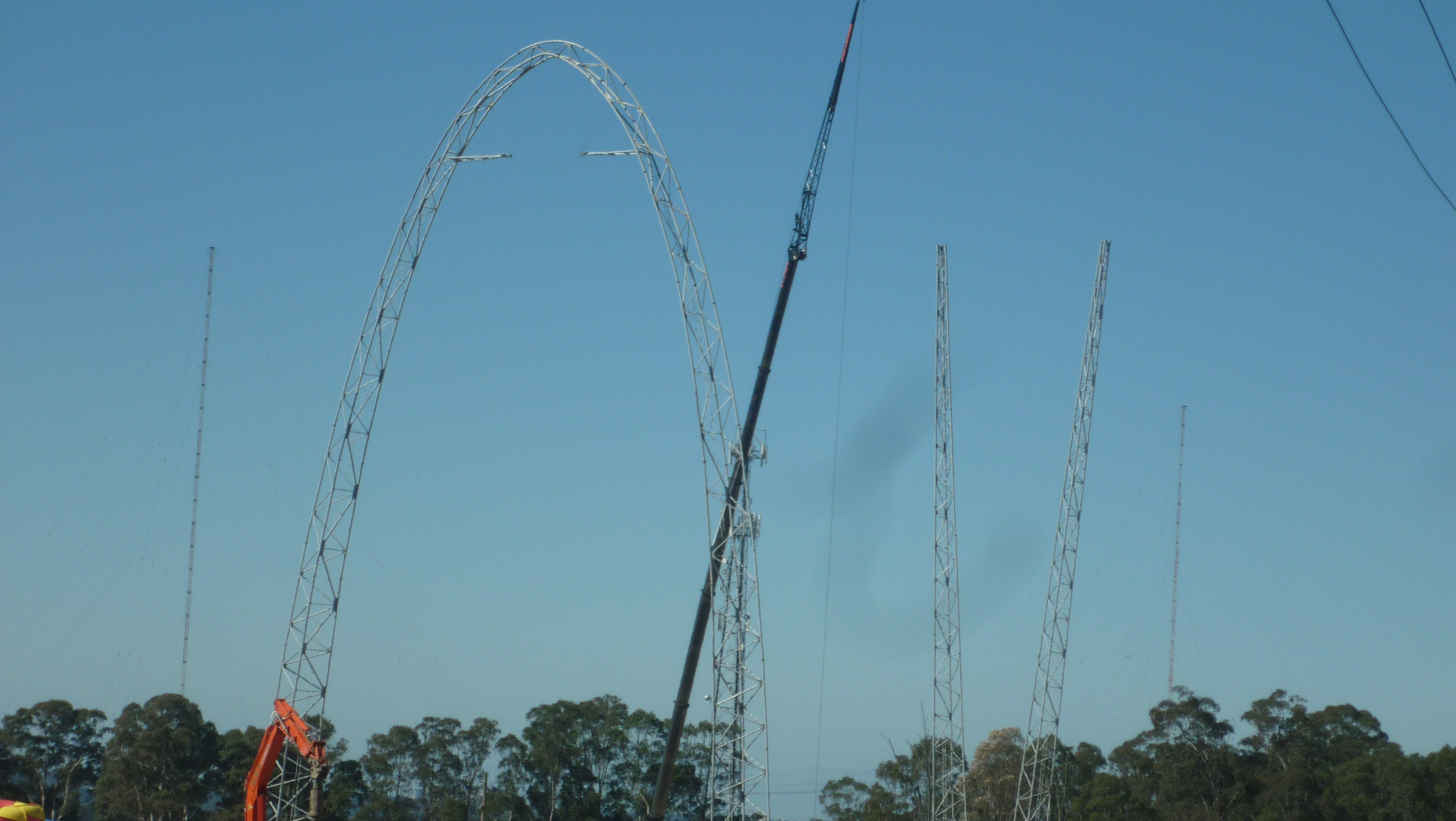
The Sydney SkyCoaster during construction

Three family-oriented attractions and one upcharge attractions are located on the ground level, detached from the main slide towers. In addition to the aforementioned wave pool, The Beach, other attractions include Dinosaur Lagoon (formerly Boomerang Bay), a lazy and action river, and Raging Waters JNR (Formerly Nickelodeon Beach and originally Wet'n'Wild Junior), a children's area featuring miniature versions of the park's main attractions. The first upcharge attraction is the Sydney SkyCoaster, the world's largest double Skycoaster. Riders are raised to a height of 251 feet (77 m) before plunging at 70 kilometres per hour (43 mph) and swinging out across The Beach. The ride was manufactured by Skycoaster, Inc., a wholly owned division of Ride Entertainment Group, which installed the ride. The second upcharge attraction, which was removed before season 4 was The Surf Deck, manufactured by Australian company LatiTube that is capable of simulating "waves" of up to 2 metres (6.6 ft).

== MyBand ==
Sydney Action Park includes a wireless ticketing and payment system fully integrated into the park's infrastructure. The technology is called MyBand and uses radio-frequency identification held inside a silicon wristband which patrons wear. Season Pass holders are issued a permanent MyBand, while Single Day Admission ticketed guests receive a temporary MyBand. The device is used by uploading cash from the park or online which can then be used to purchase retail items, food and beverages with a simple swipe. The system was designed by RFID n Print.

== Season history ==
Season 1: 12 December 2013 – 27 April 2014

Season 2: 20 September 2014 – 19 April 2015

Season 3: 19 September 2015 – 24 April 2016

Season 4: 23 September 2016 – 24 April 2017

Season 5: 23 September 2017 – 29 April 2018

Season 6: 28 September 2018 – 29 March 2019

Season 7: 28 September 2019 – 29 March 2020

Season 8: 3 October 2020 – 18 April 2021

Season 9: 18 December 2021 – 24 April 2022

Season 10: 1 October 2022 – 30 April 2023

Season 11: 25 September 2023 – 28 April 2024

Season 12: 30 September 2024 – 27 April 2025

Season 13: 29 September 2025 – 26 April 2026

Season 14: 28 September 2026 – 2 May 2027

Season 15: 27 September 2027 – 1 May 2028

Season 16: 25 September 2028 – 30 April 2029

Season 17: 24 September 2029 – 29 April 2030

Season 18: 23 September 2030 – 28 April 2031

Season 19: 29 September 2031 – 26 April 2032

Season 20: 27 September 2032 – 1 May 2033

== See also ==
- Wet'n'Wild Gold Coast
- Jamberoo Action Park
