= Palm Springs Surf Club =

Water park in Palm Springs, California

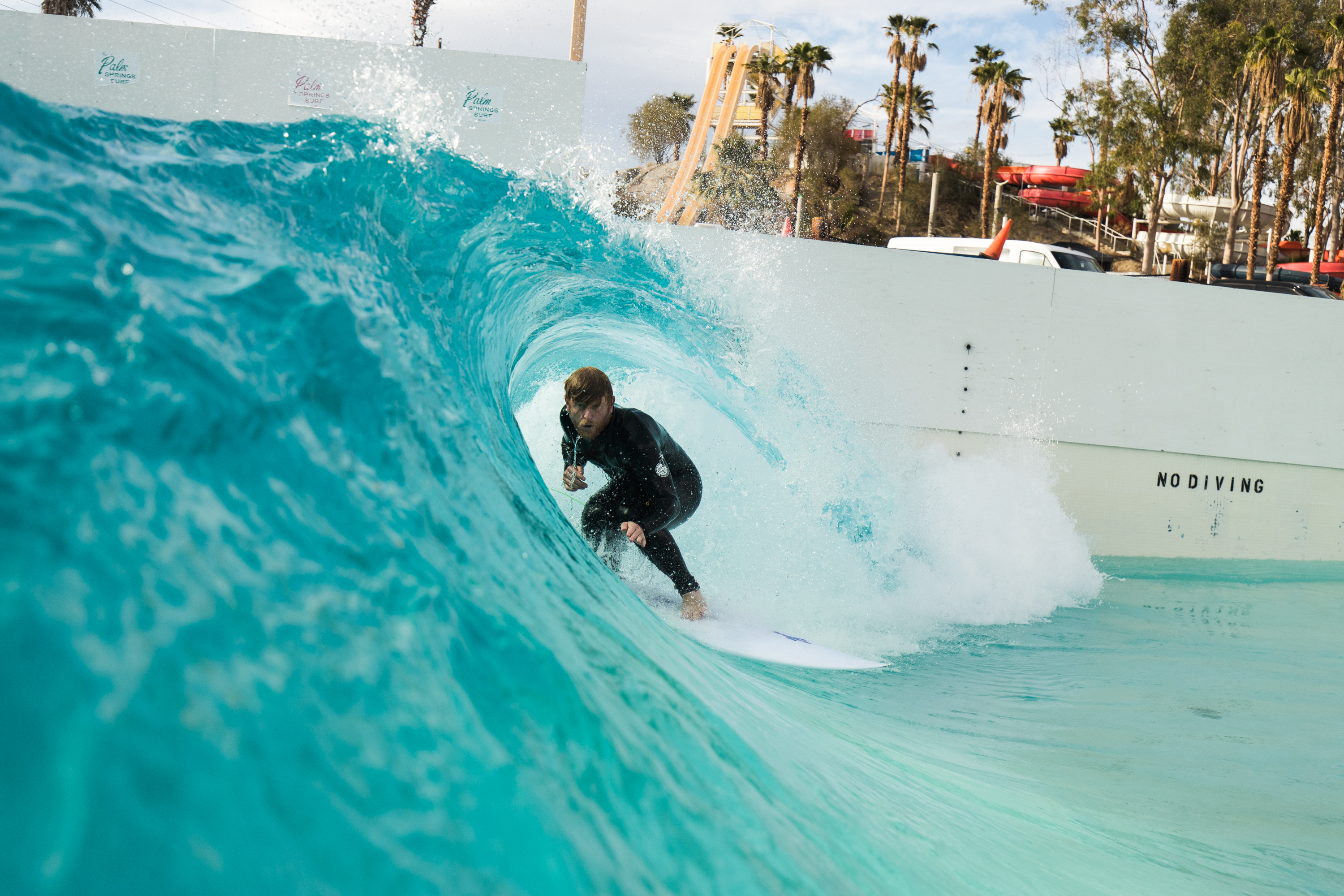
- Surf Loch at Palm Springs Surf Club
- Interactive map of Palm Springs Surf Club
- Location: Palm Springs, California, United States
- Coordinates: 33°48′15″N 116°29′29″W
- Owner: Pono Acquisition Partners I, LLC
- Opened: 1986
- Previous names: Oasis Water Park (1986–2000); Knott's Oasis Water Park (2001); Knott's Soak City (2002–2013); Wet'n'Wild Palm Springs (2014–2018)
- Area: 21 acres (8.5 ha)
- Website: https://palmspringssurfclub.com/

Palm Springs Surf Club is a surf club located in Palm Springs, California. The park operated under Cedar Fair's ownership as Knott's Soak City until 2013 when CNL Lifestyle Properties acquired it and changed the name to Wet'n'Wild Palm Springs. In 2019, the park was acquired by Pono Acquisition Partners I, LLC. The park opened in 2024.

== History ==
Palm Springs Surf Club officially opened as Oasis Water Park by Waterpark Associates in 1986. By 2001, Oasis Water Park spanned 16 acres (6.5 ha) of a 21-acre (8.5 ha) property, featured 20 attractions and had a seasonal attendance of 200,000 people. In May 2001, Cedar Fair entered into an agreement to acquire the park. The deal was finalised one month later for $9.1 million. The park was immediately branded Knott's Oasis Water Park, with additional advertising driving revenues for the remainder of the year. At the conclusion of the 2001 season Cedar Fair reported the park was down 13% at the time of acquisition, however, this was turned around to a 13% increase by the end of the season under the park's new owners.

In the 2001-2002 winter off-season, Cedar Fair invested $2 million into refurbishing and rebranding the park into a Knott's Soak City park, joining other locations in Chula Vista and Buena Park. The refurbishment included the park's gas chlorine sanitation system being replaced by a liquid chlorine equivalent, as well as the repainting and renaming of all slides to match the other Soak City parks. A Rain Fortress aqua play area by WhiteWater West was also added to the park, which reopened in March 2002. The renovation of the park saw increases in attendance and revenue of "about 40%" in the 2002 season.

On August 14, 2013, Cedar Fair announced it had sold its Palm Springs Soak City to CNL Lifestyle Properties. The park was allowed to operate under the Soak City name for the until the conclusion of the 2013 season. In November 2013, CNL Lifestyle Properties completed their acquisition of the ownership and operational rights of Wet'n'Wild Hawaii and Wet'n'Wild Phoenix. As part of the transaction with Australian firm, Village Roadshow Theme Parks, CNL also acquired rights to the Wet'n'Wild brand in the United States. In December 2013, CNL announced the Palm Springs water park would operate as Wet'n'Wild Palm Springs from the 2014 season. In January 2019, the park was acquired by Pono Acquisition Partners I, LLC and was set to reopen in 2021, however the opening was delayed until 2024 due to the COVID-19 pandemic.

== In popular culture ==
The opening scenes of the 1987 film North Shore were filmed at the Oasis Water Park wave tank. In the film, the wave tank location where the surf contest takes place was depicted as Arizona.

In June 2019, shortly before demolition commenced at Wet'n'Wild Palm Springs, professional skateboarders including Lizzie Armanto, Omar Hassan, Riley Hawk, Tony Hawk, Aaron Homoki, Kevin Kowalski, Torey Pudwill and Daewon Song spent a week filming in the closed park to create a nine-minute viral video for Thrasher Magazine entitled "High 'N' Dry".
