= American School of Paris =

International school in Saint-Cloud, France

Location
- 41, Rue Pasteur, 92210 Saint-Cloud; France
- 48.8406°N 2.1961°E

Information
- Type: International school
- Established: 1946
- CEEB code: 731270
- Head of school: Misha Simmonds
- Faculty: ±200
- Grades: Pre-K–12
- Enrollment: ±800
- Affiliation: Independent
- Website: www.asparis.org

The American School of Paris (ASP), established in 1946, is a coeducational, independent international school in Saint-Cloud, France, in the Paris metropolitan area.

The school has over 800 students from pre-kindergarten to Grade 12 and post-Bac. On a private 4-hectare (10.5 acre) campus on the edge of Paris, ASP provides an American education to an international student body of more than 60 nationalities.

== School overview ==
ASP is organized into three divisions: Lower School (Early Childhood through Grade 5, or 3–10 years old), Middle School (Grades 6-8, or ages 11–13) and Upper School (Grades 9-12 and post-Bac, or 14–18 years old). Approximately one-third of the students are American, and 17% are French. The other half of the students come from over 50 countries.

== Modern Era (1997–present) ==
In the 21st century, the school underwent modernization. A capital campaign culminated in 2018 with the inauguration of a purpose-built campus in Saint-Cloud. The renovation included the creation of "The Greentop" (a community sports garden), new STEAM and design labs, and specialized centers for the arts and filmmaking.

== Governance and Mission ==
The American School of Paris is a private, non-profit institution (organized as an association loi 1901 in France). The school is governed by a parent-elected Board of Trustees.

== Notable alumni ==
- General James L. Jones '62. President Obama's National Security Advisor and supreme allied commander, Europe
- Adam Cohen '91. Singer, songwriter, and music producer
- Geoff Chutter ’70. Founder, president, and CEO of WhiteWater West, the world's largest creator of water parks
- Elissa Freiha '08. Angel investor and founder of WOMENA
- Dexter Goei '89. American businessman, former chief executive office (CEO) of Altice
- Eva Green '97. French actress and model
- Chris Stills '93. Musician and actor
- Tim Westergren '84. Founder and CEO, Pandora
- Francesca Zambello '74. General & artistic director of Glimmerglass Festival
- Charles Martinet '74. Voice actor known primarily for providing the voice of Mario in the Super Mario franchise from 1991 to 2023
- Mark Landler ‘83. New York Times London Bureau Chief
