= Cowabunga Canyon Waterpark =

Water park in Spring Valley, Nevada

Coordinates: 36.059941°N 115.300122°W

Cowabunga Canyon
- Interactive map of Cowabunga Canyon
- Location: Spring Valley, Nevada, United States
- Owner: Pyek Group
- Opened: May 23, 2013
- Area: 41 acres (17 ha)
- Pools: 2 pools
- Water slides: 10 water slides
- Children's areas: A single children's area
- Website: Official website

Cowabunga Canyon Waterpark is a water park in Spring Valley, Nevada. The park was part of Village Roadshow Theme Parks' Wet'n'Wild chain of water parks located across the world, until it was purchased by Pyek Group in March 2022. Pyek Group also owns Cowabunga Bay and together these 2 water parks makeup the Cowabunga Vegas brand. The park is located at 7055 S. Fort Apache Road, southwest of the I-215 and Sunset Road interchange.

== History ==
Logo before Pyek Group purchase. Branded as Wet'n'Wild Las Vegas

On August 6, 2011, plans to develop a 26-acre (11 ha) water park in the Las Vegas Valley were unveiled. The owners of the Hawaiian Falls chain of water parks in Texas were behind the proposal to open the park by Memorial Day Weekend 2012. On November 14, 2011, Splash Canyon Waterpark was officially announced along with a listing of the rides and attractions to be included in the park. On February 3, 2012, it was announced that the opening of the water park would be delayed by a year.

In June 2012, Australian-based entertainment company Village Roadshow revealed they had plans to open a Wet'n'Wild-branded water park in Las Vegas. The company already operated Wet'n'Wild Hawaii and Wet'n'Wild Phoenix in the United States, as well as amusement and water parks in Australia including Wet'n'Wild Gold Coast. On October 4, 2012, it was announced that Village Roadshow Theme Parks would be opening Wet'n'Wild Las Vegas in May 2013 on the site of the proposed Splash Canyon Waterpark. Village Roadshow held a 51% stake in the park with private investors including Andre Agassi and Steffi Graf holding the remaining 49%. The 41-acre (17 ha) water park cost over US$50 million.

In mid-May 2013, Wet'n'Wild Las Vegas announced the park's opening and operating schedule, as well as a charity auction for the first rides on four of the park's slides. Due to the popularity of the park, Wet'n'Wild Las Vegas' opening was staggered for different ticket holders. Following a private grand opening party on May 23, the park opened to Gold Pass holders on May 25, Season Pass holders on May 28, and all other ticket holders on June 3.

Demand for season passes caused the park to cease selling passes for the year, and pushed expansion of the park forward to the immediate end of the season, as Village Roadshow owned 71 acres around the park for future expansion.

A 2019 high school "neon night" was marred by multiple fights requiring police intervention and an early closure of the park.

Due to the COVID-19 pandemic, Wet'n'Wild Las Vegas did not open in spring 2020. Even after legal restrictions were removed, Wet'n'Wild Las Vegas remained closed.

In March 2022, the Wet'n'Wild property was purchased by Pyek Group and re-branded as Cowabunga Canyon Waterpark, which joined into partnership with Cowabunga Bay Waterpark, known as Cowabunga Vegas. Season passes are shared between the two parks. Cowabunga Canyon opened in May 2022.

== Attractions ==
Cowabunga Canyon features 26 attractions including:

- Deuce's Wild – two speed slides (formerly known as Canyon Cliffs)
- Cactus Creek – a 1,000-foot-long (300 m) lazy river (formerly known as Colorado Cooler)
- Hi-Ho Silver – a multi-person raft ride featuring corkscrew turns and speeds of up to 18 miles per hour (29 km/h) (formerly known as Constrictor)
- Ricochet Racer – a 360-foot-long (110 m) multi-lane racer water slide with 6 lanes (formerly known as Desert Racers)
- Boomer Wrangler – a WhiteWater West Boomerango water slide (formerly known as Hoover Half Pipe)
- The Lone Ranger – a WhiteWater West Rattler water slide (formerly known as Rattler)
- Dust Bowl – a WhiteWater West bowl water slide (formerly known as Royal Flush Extreme)
- Piñata Falls – a WhiteWater West AquaPlay area which features a variety of slides as well as a 300-US-gallon (1,100 L) tipping bucket (formerly known as Splash Island)
- Cadillac Shores – a 17,000-square-foot (1,600 m^{2}) wave pool capable of producing 3-foot-high (0.91 m) waves (formerly known as "The Wave Pool")
- Boot, Scoot, & Boogie – a series of inline tube slides (formerly known as Zipp, Zapp, and Zoom)
- Texas Tornado – a ProSlide Technology Tornado water slide (formerly known as Tornado)
