= Wet'n'Wild Hawaii =

Water park in Kapolei, Oahu, Hawaii

- Interactive map of Wet'n'Wild Hawaii
- Location: Kapolei, Hawaii, United States
- Coordinates: 21°20′06″N 158°05′16″W
- Owner: EPR Properties
- Operated by: Village Roadshow Theme Parks (2008-2013); Premier Parks, LLC (2014-)
- Opened: May 1999
- Previous names: Hawaiian Waters Adventure Park
- Operating season: Year-round
- Pools: 2 pools
- Water slides: 10 water slides
- Children's areas: 3 children's areas
- Website: wetnwildhawaii.com

Wet'n'Wild Hawaii (formerly Hawaiian Waters Adventure Park) is a water park located in Kapolei in the City and County of Honolulu on Oahu. The park occupies 29 acres (120,000 m^{2}) of land and has more than 25 rides and attractions. It is currently the only water park in the state of Hawaii. It is one of four water parks operating under the Wet'n'Wild brand globally.

Wet'n'Wild Hawaii was defined in the Makakilo City CDP in the 2000 U.S. census but for the 2010 U.S. census was redefined as being in Kapolei CDP.

== History ==
On October 6, 1998, construction began for the 25-acre (10 ha) Hawaiian Waters Adventure Park. The water park was the first venture by limited liability company, Waters of Kapolei. Owned by dentist Jack Harrington and lawyer Brooks Cutter, Waters of Kapolei, LLC invested $14 million in the park. The park officially opened on May 28, 1999. In the park's first month of operation, it experienced 20% higher-than-expected attendance, resulting in a total of 440,000 visitors in its first year of operation. This saw the park add a new attraction just one year after opening.

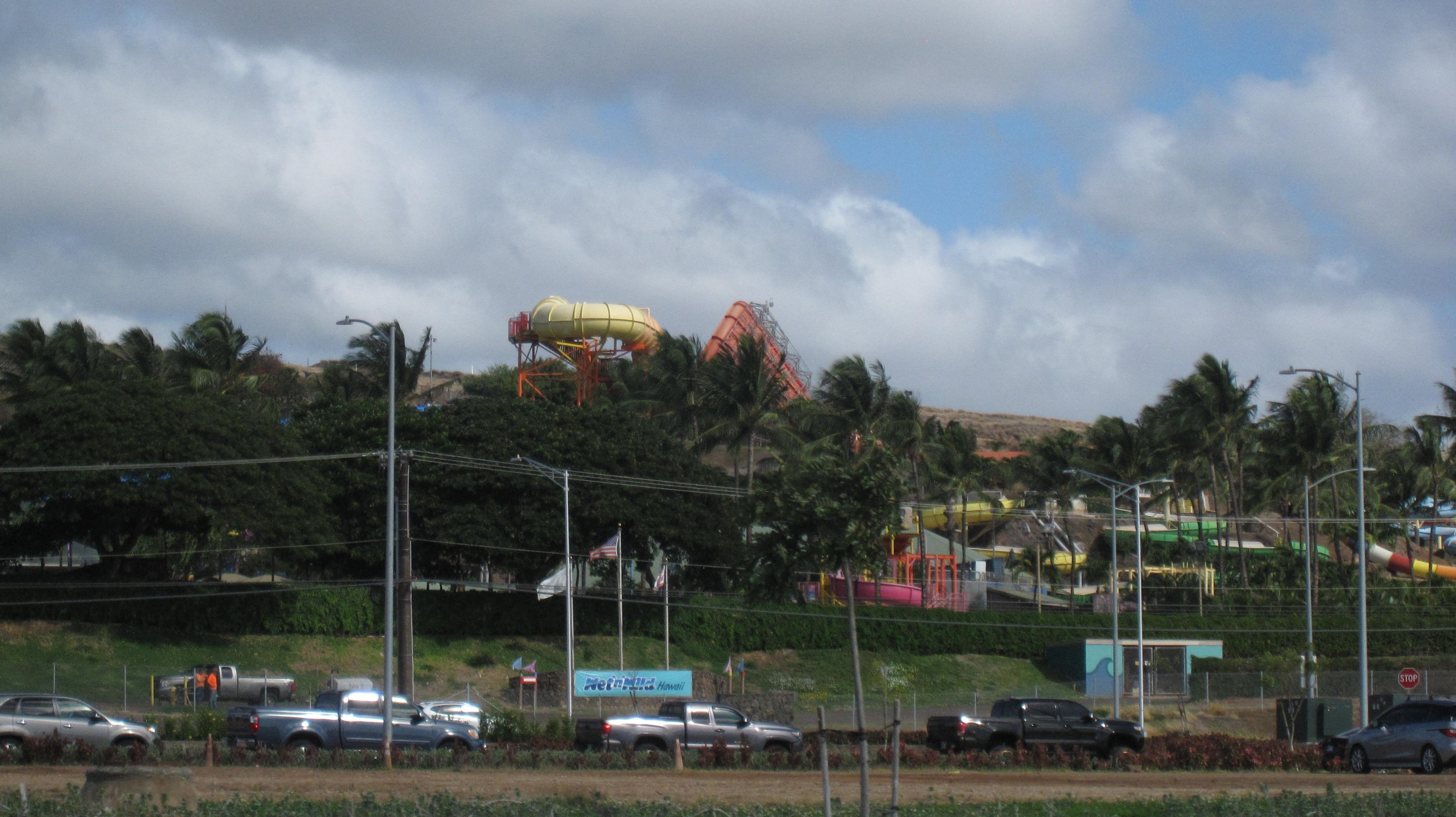
Park as seen from Farrington Highway

In May 2007, Wet'n'Wild Hawaii opened Island Adventure Golf, an 18-hole high-end miniature golf facility. The miniature golf course features lush tropical landscape, nine ADA-compliant holes, a putting green, surfboard hazards, water ways, waterfall, large ocean and beach area, mock fish and sea turtles, lava rock formations and coral reef displays.

In March 2008, an agreement was announced in which the park would be sold to Village Roadshow Limited, making Wet'n'Wild Hawaii the Australian company's first theme park in the United States. The $27 million deal closed in May that year. In early 2009, the company announced the park would open under its new name, Wet'n'Wild Hawaii.

Village Roadshow's ownership of the park was short-lived. The park was sold to CNL Lifestyle Properties for an undisclosed sum in 2009. Village Roadshow Theme Parks, however, continued to operate the park on a lease which concluded in November 2013. Premier Parks, LLC took over operations for the 2014 season. In 2025, two new enclosed body slides, the Volcanic Wedgeee, opened.

== Rides ==
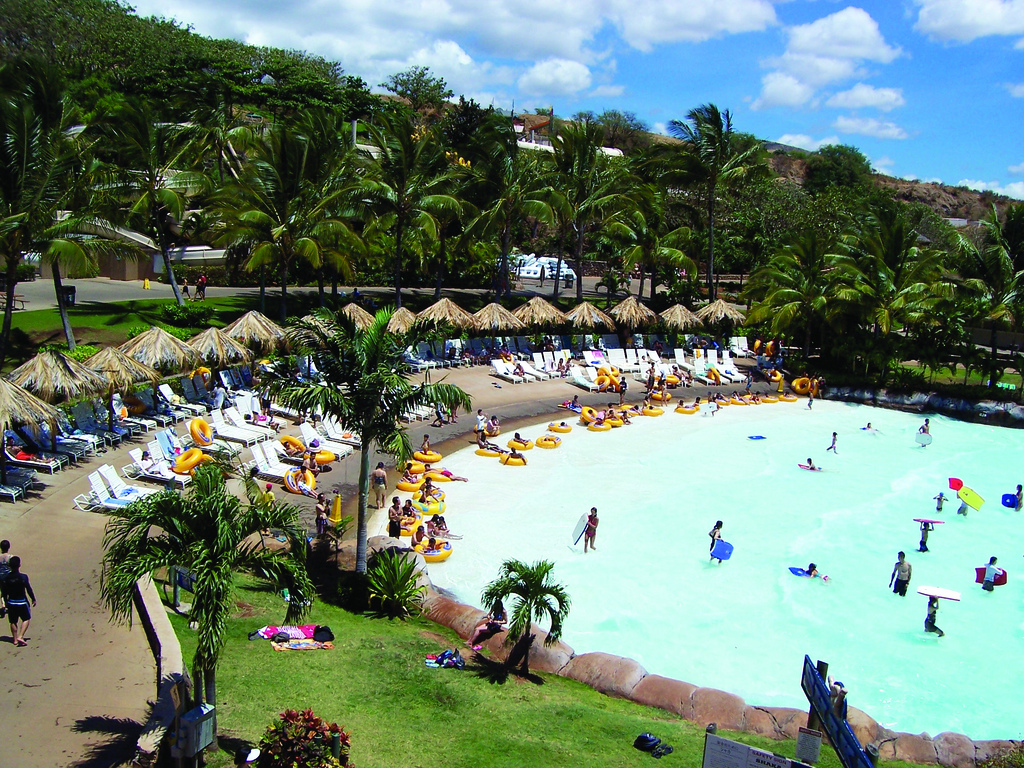
Hawaiian Waters wave pool

Below is a list of rides at the water park.

- Big Kahuna
- (Cutter's Island) Closed
- Da FlowRider
- Hawaiian Waters Wave Pool
- (Island Adventure Golf) Closed
- Kapolei Kooler Lazy River
- Keiki Kove
- Lil'Kahuna Beach
- O-Hana Highway (Formerly "Raging River")
- Shaka
- Surfsliders
- Tornado
- Volcano Express (Formerly "Island Racer")
- Volcanic Wedgeee
- Waianae Coasters
- Waimea Whirl
- (Water World) Closed

== See also ==
- Wet'n'Wild Phoenix
- Wet'n'Wild Palm Springs
- Wet'n'Wild Las Vegas
- Wet'n'Wild Gold Coast
- Wet'n'Wild Sydney
