= Wet'n'Wild (brand) =

Water park brand

- Type: Private
- Industry: Amusement park operator
- Founded: September 30, 1984; 42 years ago
- Headquarters: Gold Coast, Queensland
- Owner: Village Roadshow Theme Parks and EPR Properties

Wet'n'Wild is a brand used for many water parks across the world owned by Village Roadshow Theme Parks and EPR Properties. It is distinct from the Wet 'n Wild brand originally owned by SeaWorld creator George Millay or Wet N' Wild Waterworld, a stand-alone water park in Anthony, Texas, US.

== History ==
The Wet'n'Wild brand originates from Wet'n'Wild Water World on the Gold Coast, Australia. It first opened in 1984 as Cade's County Waterpark, and was renamed to Wet'n'Wild in 1987 after a licensing agreement was reached with the chain of Wet 'n Wild water parks overseas.

In 2008, Village Roadshow Theme Parks, the owners of Wet'n'Wild Water World, proposed to acquire Aussie World and redevelop it into Wet'n'Wild Aussie World; however, these plans were cancelled. Internationally the company acquired the Hawaiian Waters Adventure Park in the United States. The park was rebranded to Wet'n'Wild Hawaii the following year. The company also purchased WaterWorld Safari, investing US$30 million in the park relaunched as Wet'n'Wild Phoenix.

Wet'n'Wild Hawaii was sold to CNL Lifestyle Properties for an undisclosed sum in 2009, but Village Roadshow Theme Parks continued to operate the park. In 2013, new Wet'n'Wild water parks were built by Village Roadshow Theme Parks in Las Vegas and Sydney.

In November 2013, CNL Lifestyle Properties purchased Wet'n'Wild Phoenix, with Premier Parks, LLC taking over operations of both Wet'n'Wild Phoenix and Wet'n'Wild Hawaii for the 2014 season. CNL Lifestyle Properties also purchased the rights to the Wet'n'Wild brand in the United States. Village Roadshow Theme Parks continued to operate and hold a majority stake in ownership of Wet'n'Wild Las Vegas. CNL Lifestyle Properties' ownership of the Wet'n'Wild brand in the United States led them to branding their recently acquired California water park as Wet'n'Wild Palm Springs, and their SplashTown Houston park as Wet'n'Wild SplashTown.

In 2018, the first Chinese Wet'n'Wild water park opened, owned by Guangzhou R&F Properties and operated by Village Roadshow Theme Parks.

In 2016, Premier Parks purchased independent Wild Water Kingdom in Brampton, Ontario, Canada and renamed it Wet'n'Wild Toronto.

In July 2018, Parques Reunidos purchased Wet'n'Wild Sydney from Village Roadshow Theme Parks, and later renamed the park Raging Waters Sydney.

== Locations ==
Locations of Wet'n'Wild water parks
- Wet'n'Wild Gold Coast
- Wet'n'Wild Haikou
- Wet'n'Wild Hawaii
- Wet'n'Wild Toronto

=== Previous locations ===
- Wet'n'Wild Phoenix
- Wet'n'Wild SplashTown
- Wet'n'Wild Las Vegas
- Wet'n'Wild Palm Springs
- Wet'n'Wild Sydney
