= The Flash: Speed Force =

Roller coaster in Australia

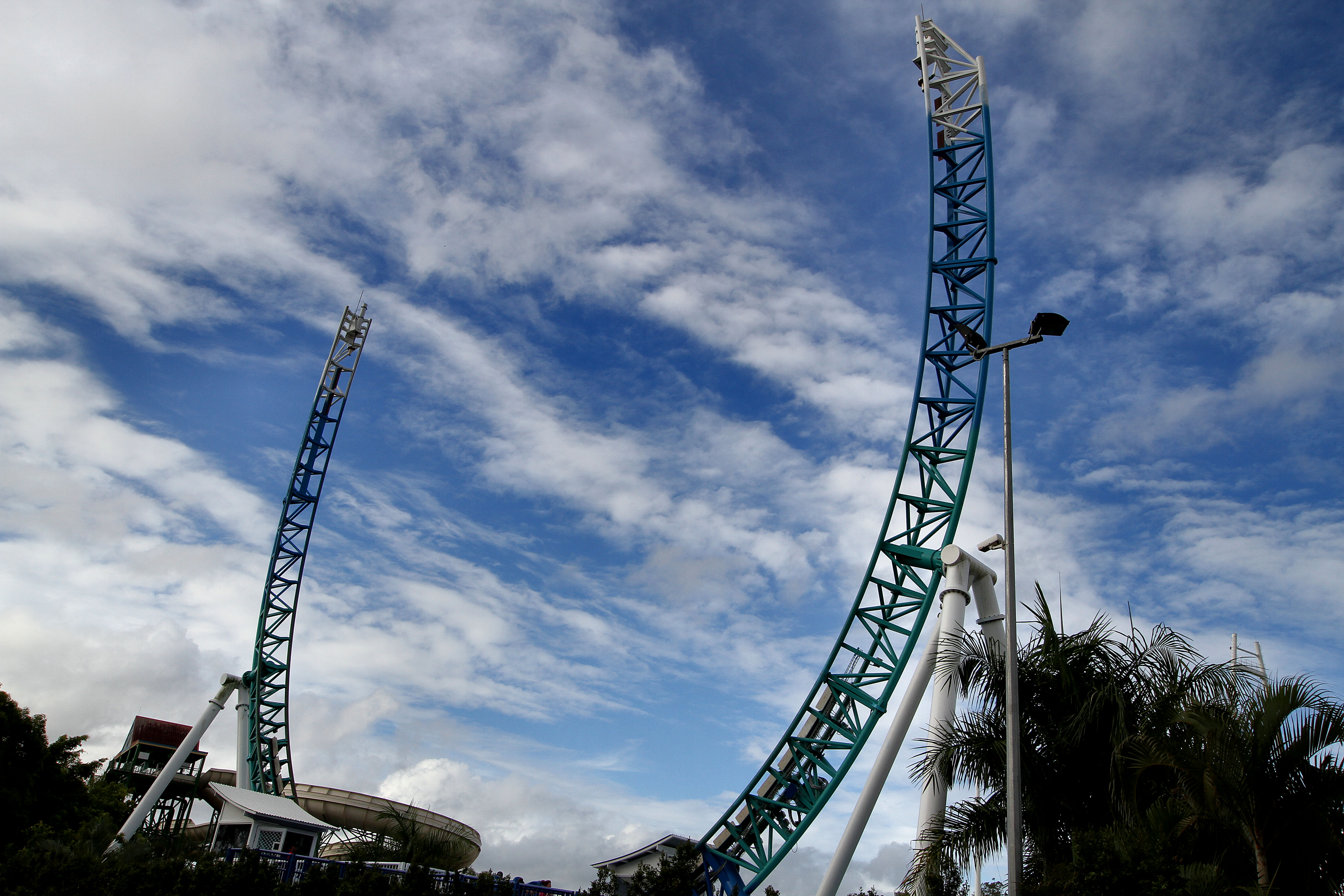
- Before its removal in 2023, the ride operated at Wet'n'Wild Gold Coast as Surfrider

Warner Bros. Movie World
- Coordinates: 27°54′28.7″S 153°18′45.1″E
- Status: Operating
- Opening date: 13 May 2024

Wet'n'Wild Gold Coast
- Name: Surfrider
- Coordinates: 27°54′51.5″S 153°18′59.2″E
- Status: Removed
- Opening date: September 2007
- Closing date: April 2023
- Surfrider at Wet'n'Wild Gold Coast at RCDB

General statistics
- Type: Steel – Shuttle – Launched
- Manufacturer: Intamin
- Designer: Ing.-Büro Stengel GmbH
- Model: Half Pipe Roller Coaster
- Lift/launch system: LSM
- Height: 30 m (98 ft)
- Drop: 25 m (82 ft)
- Length: 70 m (230 ft)
- Inversions: 0
- Duration: 1 minute
- Max vertical angle: 90°
- Capacity: 460 riders per hour
- Height restriction: 140 cm (4 ft 7 in)
- Trains: Single train with a single car. Riders are arranged 6 across in 2 rows for a total of 12 riders per train.
- Restraint Style: Over the Shoulder Restraints
- The Flash: Speed Force at RCDB

The Flash: Speed Force is a steel shuttle roller coaster at Warner Bros. Movie World on the Gold Coast in Queensland, Australia. Opened on 13 May 2024, it is an Intamin Half Pipe roller coaster themed to the DC Comics superhero the Flash. The ride originally opened as Surfrider at the nearby Wet'n'Wild Gold Coast, where it operated from September 2007 until 2020, before being removed in April 2023.

== History ==
In February 2007, roller coaster parts began arriving in Wet'n'Wild Gold Coast's car park. The Gold Coast Bulletin later reported the ride as being an Intamin Half Pipe roller coaster with an opening date scheduled for the September school holidays. In late April, Wet'n'Wild Gold Coast officially confirmed this report by announcing the Surfrider. After a relatively short construction period, the ride was fully assembled by July 2007. The ride opened in September 2007.

Surfrider was originally planned to be installed at Sea World, a theme park owned by the same company as Wet'n'Wild Gold Coast, Village Roadshow Theme Parks. After purchasing the ride from Intamin, the location where it was to be installed was changed.

The ride was standing but not operating from 2020 until April 2023, when it was removed pending relocation to Warner Bros. Movie World. It was scheduled to open at the park in April 2024 as The Flash: Speed Force, themed to the DC Comics superhero The Flash but the opening was postponed to 13 May. It was built within the footprint of the existing Superman Escape coaster.

== Ride ==
Riders are placed in one of two cars on the train which is made to resemble a giant surfboard. Each car is a free-spinning circle that holds six people. The track is essentially a giant, upright U and trains are loaded at the bottom of the U. Linear synchronous motors accelerate the train up both sides of the track. A typical ride lasts for approximately 1 minute.

Several water features were originally included to simulate riding a wave but later were not used. Surfrider was listed as a seasonal attraction and did not operate in the winter months.

== Similar rides ==
- Avatar Airbender, a similar ride at Nickelodeon Universe
- RC Racer, a similar ride at several Disney parks
