= Paradise Country =

Homestead in Oxenford, Gold Coast, Queensland

Paradise Country is an Australian homestead where guests are shown a variety of Australian animals including koalas, kangaroos and emus. The farm tour also includes several shows which feature the making of billy tea, a stock horse demonstration and a boomerang throwing demonstration in Oxenford on the Gold Coast, Queensland. Paradise Country opened in 2005 and is a part of the Village Roadshow Theme Parks.

== See also ==
- Village Roadshow Theme Parks
