= Geoff Chutter =

Canadian executive

Geoff Chutter (born 1952) is the founder, president and CEO of WhiteWater West, the world’s largest designer and manufacturer of water parks.

== Early life ==
Chutter was born and raised and in Vancouver, British Columbia. His father was an engineer for a Lafarge cement plant; his father’s work temporarily relocated the family to Paris where Chutter attended high school. He earned a degree as an accountant from University of Toronto.

== Career ==
While working as an auditor for KPMG, he visited the first waterslide park in Canada, located in Kelowna. He founded WhiteWater West in 1980, together with his uncle, in Penticton, Canada. That location has since closed, but in 2020, the company has over 5,000 installments, 600 employees, and international offices.

He was a candidate in the Vancouver Quadra political race in 1993 as a member of the Conservative party.

== Personal life ==
Chutter is unmarried with one child from a previous marriage. His son Paul joined the family business in 2014 as chief business development officer.

== Awards ==
- 2000: Chutter and Whitewater were inducted into The World Waterpark Association Hall of Fame.
- 2013: Chutter was named one of Aquatics International’s most influential people.
- 2019: Ernst & Young’s Canadian Entrepreneur of the Year in 2019
- 2019: Outstanding Service Award by the Global Association for the Attractions (IAAPA)
