= Elissa Freiha =

Emirati-Lebanese-American businesswoman

- Pronunciation: إليسا فريحة
- Education: American University of Paris (bachelor's degree)
- Occupations: Businesswoman, Entrepreneur, Investor, Executive producer, Feminist activist
- Known for: Most Powerful Business Women in the Middle East, Influential Arabs under 40
- Notable work: Founder of Womena
- Awards: Entrepreneur of the Year, Investor of the Year

Elissa Freiha (Arabic: إليسا فريحة; born 1989 or 1990 (age 35–36)) is an Emirati-Lebanese-American businesswoman, entrepreneur, investor, executive producer, and feminist activist. She is the founder of Womena, a female-focused media company that aims to inspire real change through storytelling and digital content. Womena launched in 2014 as an angel-investment network which aimed to economically empower women by educating them on early-stage venture capital investment and facilitating the process of women angel investors investing in new MENA-based startups. However, in 2018, Freiha pivoted the business towards creating a wider impact for women of the region and reimagined Womena as the storytelling platform it is today. In 2018 Freiha and Womena also launched Womentum, a tech accelerator and documentary series for female-led start-ups in the Middle East.

Freiha has won numerous awards for her work in the Middle East region's startup ecosystem, including "Entrepreneur of the Year" and "Investor of the Year". She is also frequently listed as one of the "Most Powerful Business Women in the Middle East" and "Influential Arabs under 40" by various publications.

In July 2021, Freiha was appointed as a Board Member to the Dubai Chamber of Digital Economy.

== Biography ==
Freiha is the granddaughter of Said Freiha, an entrepreneur who founded the media publisher, Dar Assayad. Freiha grew up largely in Paris, where her father, Bassam Freiha, was employed by UNESCO. She graduated with a bachelor's degree in global communications at the American University of Paris, and subsequently worked for a bakery in Paris and then for PR firm Flash Entertainment in Abu Dhabi after graduating. Freiha met her former Womena co-founder, Chantalle Dumonceaux, while studying at the American University of Paris in 2008, and the two later set up business together. As of 2017, some 40 angel investors associated with Womena have invested more than AED 2 million in seven start-ups in the United Arab Emirates, including Zurich and New York City investors.

In 2015, Freiha was listed as one of BBC's 100 Women. In addition, Forbes named her one of the "Inspiring Business Leaders of the UAE". In 2019, Elissa was a recipient of One Young World's inaugural Entrepreneur of the Year Award.
