= Wet'n'Wild Toronto =

Water park in Brampton, Ontario, Canada

- Interactive map of Wet'n'Wild Toronto
- Slogan: Water you waiting for?
- Location: Brampton, Ontario, Canada
- Coordinates: 43°44′27.02″N 79°38′23.55″W
- Owner: Premier Parks, LLC
- General manager: Robert Karim
- Previous names: Sunshine Beach Water Park, Wild Water Kingdom
- Operating season: June to Labour Day
- Area: 100-acre (0.40 km2)
- Pools: 2 pools
- Water slides: 27 water slides
- Website: www.wetnwildtoronto.com

Wet'n'Wild Toronto (formerly known as Sunshine Beach and later Wild Water Kingdom) is a water park in Brampton, Ontario, Canada, a city in the Greater Toronto Area. Opened in 1986, the 100-acre (0.40 km^{2}) complex hosts a variety of attractions, including numerous water slides, a wave pool, a lazy river, a four lane zip-line and two kids' splash areas. Since becoming Wet'n'Wild Toronto, the park has established a stronger family-focus and has eliminated a number of bars and food vendors within the park confines.

== Operating history ==
=== 1980s ===
The water park opened in 1986 with a kids' water playground named Dolphins' Bay with multiple Splash Pads, Dry Playground, seven children's water slides, and a wading pool.

=== 1990s ===
Pending competition from Canada's Wonderland's new water park, Splash Works, influenced the addition of large wave pool at Wild Water Kingdom in 1992. This wave pool remains the fourth largest in Canada behind those found at Wild Water Works in Hamilton, Splash Works at Canada's Wonderland, and Calypso Waterpark in Ottawa.

In 1995, Wild Water Kingdom added two water slides Cyclone and Devil's Drop. They also built a Lazy river. Wild Water Kingdom installed a hot tub and added batting cages and mini golf courses in 1997. More slides were built, and many food-service chains such as Pizza Pizza and Mr. Sub began partnerships with Wild Water Kingdom.

=== 2000s ===
In the early 2000s, many new water attractions were added to the park, including Midnight Express, The Abyss, and Nightrider. In 2008 the hot tub was removed. Throughout the late 2000s, Wild Water Kingdom focused on expanding their saltwater attractions, and in 2009, the Wave Pool was retrofitted to be filled with saltwater, becoming the first of its kind in Canada.

=== 2010s ===
New bars were added, and Wild Water Kingdom announces their first mascot, "Hugo the Hippo." BeaverTails opened at the park as part of the dining options. In July 2012 a new zip line attraction called Face Drop was added. The first of its kind in Canada, Face Drop has four 1,200-foot long high-tension cable rides that can be reaching speeds of 50 km/h

In May 2015, Wild Water Kingdom announced that it would be closed for the 2015 season while it underwent major renovations and expansions. The water park remained closed during the 2016 season for continued renovations, but the sports complex and golf driving range remained open.

Premier Parks, LLC, the operator of multiple attraction properties in Canada and the United States, acquired Wild Water Kingdom in July 2016. They announced a complete rebuild. The new expansion includes the renovation and renaming of most of the old slides, plus five new slides and two new kiddie attractions. The park reopened for the 2017 season on June 30, 2017, and was renamed Wet 'n' Wild to match with its sister parks after several sneak peeks.

=== 2020s ===
The park did not open for the 2020 season due to the restrictions placed by the Government of Ontario to combat the COVID-19 pandemic, as such, 2020 season passes and tickets were extended to cover the park's 2021 season.

The park officially reopened to the general public for the 2021 season on July 7, 2021. An online reservation system was put in place for guests to book the date of their visit and time of arrival, with health screenings and face masks required for guests. The park was also open for the 2023 season.

== Hosted events ==
June 2012: Wild Water Kingdom held their first "Beach Club Festival," an 18+ beach-themed party lasting till 3am. This became an annual event until the 2015 closure.

July 6, 2013: Drake and P. Reign hosted a pool party called Dear America.

August 10, 2013: Wild Water Kingdom held an event called "the O Course" was based on U.S. Marine Corps fitness training, endurance, strength, speed, and stamina. This is Canada's only training course designed by and led by former U.S. Marine drill instructor Sgt. Tony Austin.

August 30, 2013: Summer Rush, organized by radio station Z103.5 was held at Wild Water Kingdom.

September 21, 2015: The O Course Pink, a military obstacle course competition that raised over $25,000 in support of Rethink Breast Cancer.

May 30, 2015: SOS Fest Toronto (Summer of Soca Restival).

July 4–5, 2016: SOR Fest, also known as the Summer of Reggae Festival, a two-day concert event.

July 30–31, 2016: Caribana Weekend with events including Carnival Kingdom, Caribana's largest outdoor concert.
