= WhiteWater West =

Water park equipment manufacturer

WhiteWater
- Type: Private
- Industry: Manufacturing
- Founded: 1980; 46 years ago
- Founder: Geoff Chutter
- Headquarters: Richmond, British Columbia, Canada
- Area served: Worldwide
- Products: Water slides, water rides, interactive play structures, lazy rivers, wave pools, FlowRider
- Services: Park planning, engineering, manufacturing, service
- Number of employees: 600 (2020)
- Divisions: Vantage; FlowRider
- Website: www.whitewaterwest.com

WhiteWater is a manufacturing company based in Richmond, British Columbia, Canada. It was established in 1980 and manufactures a variety of products for water parks including water slides and water play areas. The company also owns FlowRider, which produces a line of surf simulators.

== History ==
In 1980, WhiteWater West was established by Geoff Chutter, a former accountant. The company's first project was the WhiteWater Waterslide and Recreation Complex in Penticton, Canada.

In 1982, WhiteWater West acquired WhiteWater Composites. This was followed by the merger with Brookside Engineering in 1985 and Barr & Wray in 1987.

In 1998, the company entered into a limited license agreement to manufacture FlowRiders.

In 2002, WhiteWater acquired Prime Play (now Prime Interactives).

In 2014, WhiteWater acquired Wave Loch's FlowRider line of products and IP.

In 2015 and 2016, Canada named WhiteWater Best Managed Company.

In 2018, WhiteWater launched Vantage, a guest engagement and operational optimization platform, which was the recipient of an IAAPA Brass Ring Award in 2018 and a WWA Leading Edge Award in 2019.

In 2019, the company announced a deal with Wiegand-Maelzer to acquire exclusive rights to the award-winning SlideWheel.

== Installations ==
WhiteWater West has completed over 5,000 projects worldwide and has a workforce of over 600 employees. Some notable installations include:

- AquaDuck on the Disney Dream and the Disney Fantasy cruise ships
- Disney's Typhoon Lagoon's Surf Pool in Orlando, Florida, United States
- Sunway Lagoon in Selangor, Malaysia features WhiteWater products such as a Boomerango, Abyss, AquaLoop, and AquaPlay.
- Tsunami Surge in Gurnee, Illinois, United States
- Wet'n'Wild Gold Coast in Queensland, Australia
- Wet'n'Wild Las Vegas in Las Vegas, Nevada, United States
- Ramayana Water Park in Pattaya, Thailand
- Shanghai Haichang Ocean Park in Shanghai, China, is home to the world's longest Spinning Rapids Ride.
- Curious George Goes to Town at Universal Studios Florida, a water play area featuring large buckets that dump water.
