= Jamberoo Action Park =

Water action park in NSW

- Previously known as Jamberoo Recreation Park
- Interactive map of Jamberoo Action Park
- Location: Jamberoo, New South Wales, Australia
- Coordinates: 34.6168°S 150.783°E
- Opened: 24 October 1980
- Owner: Jim Eddy
- General manager: Matt George
- Slogan: "Where you control the action"
- Operating season: Spring through Autumn
- Area: Jamberoo

Attractions
- Total: 15
- Roller coasters: 1 (Bobsled)
- Water rides: 12
- Website: www.jamberoo.net

People in the outback bay tidal pool

Jamberoo Action Park is a seasonal water theme park, which operates between September and April inclusive. Jamberoo Action Park is a water park and is located in Jamberoo, New South Wales. It is approximately 34 km from Nowra, 15 minutes from Kiama, 30 minutes south of Wollongong and a little over an hour south of Sydney. It contains such rides as: The Perfect Storm, Funnel Web, The Taipan, The Rock and more. Jamberoo Action Park introduced a water thrill ride precinct "Velocity Falls" in September 2022 and has plans to continue development.

== Gallery ==
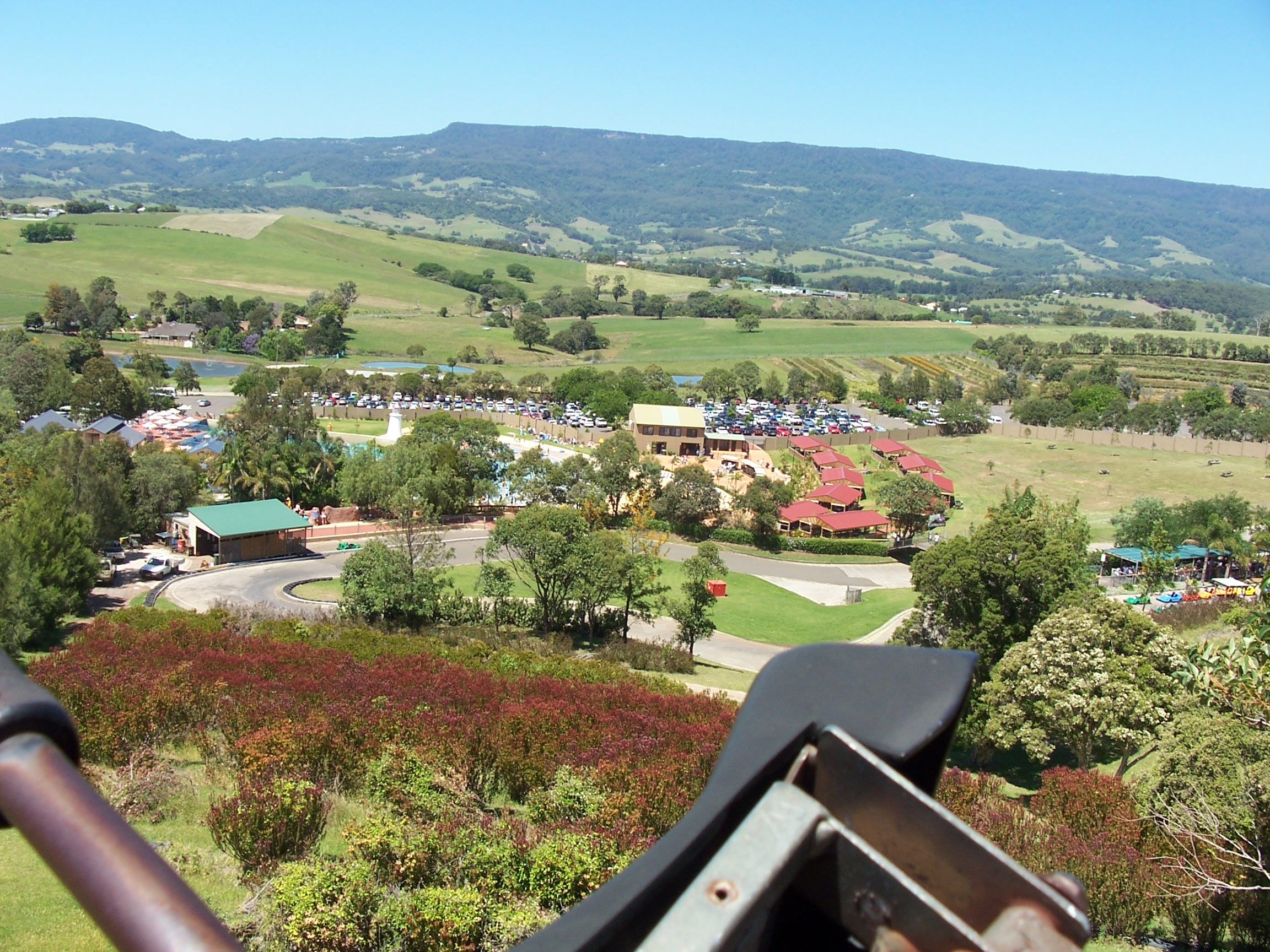
Jamberoo Action Park

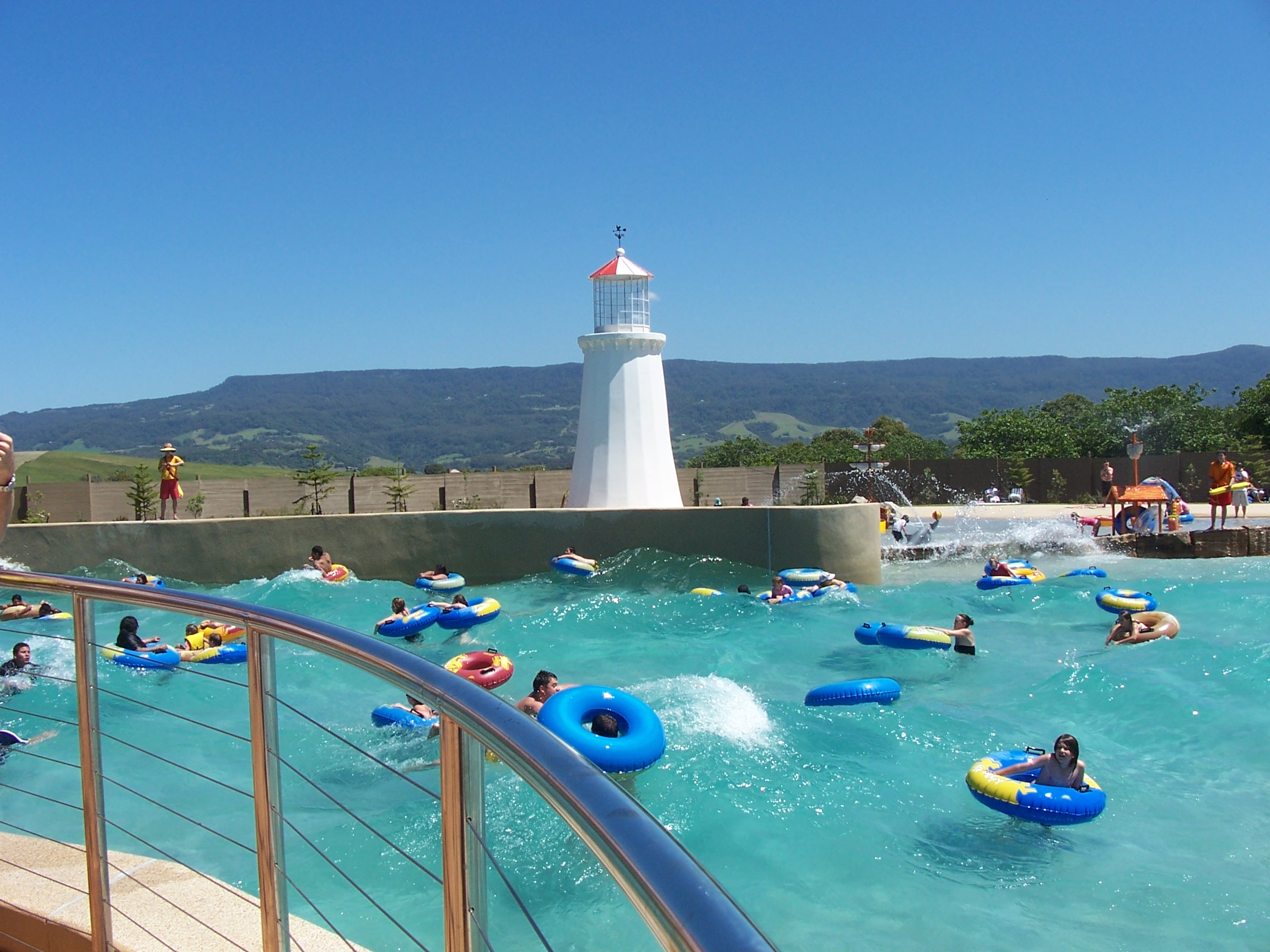
Outback Bay

== See also ==
- Action Park
