= Wet 'n' Wild Waterworld =

Waterpark in Anthony, Texas

Coordinates: 31.990°N 106.585°W

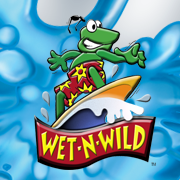
- Wet 'n' Wild Waterworld Anthony, TX logo
- Location: Anthony, Texas, United States
- Opened: 1979 (as Wet n Wild Waterslides)
- Operating season: Summer
- Website: Official Website

Wet 'n' Wild Waterworld is a 60 acre waterpark featuring over 25 rides and attractions and a canopy of mature shade trees. It is located at 8804 S. Desert in Anthony, Texas, United States, a small town in between El Paso, Texas, and Las Cruces, New Mexico.

== Park ==
The park usually opens the first weekend in May, and closes after Labor Day. It has over twenty-five rides and attractions. In addition to traditional water rides, the park has a wave pool, a lazy river, shallow kiddie pools, a spray park, and a climbing wall. Amenities include shaded picnic areas with tables, a restaurant, air conditioned VIP Suites for parties, cabana rentals, locker rentals, grill rentals, inner tube rentals, and reserved parking. The mix of attractions, from thrill rides to a spray park for toddlers, is meant to appeal to all age groups with a focus on families. Wet 'n' Wild offers free life jackets to kids at the park.

Guest can bring their own food and beverages and are not charged a cooler fee. The park does feature a restaurant called The Ribbit Cafe, which offers traditional waterpark fare, such as burgers, fries, nachos, snow cones, and funnel cakes, as well as regional specialties, including corn-in-a-cup, papas locas, piña con chamoy, and aguas frescas.

Wet 'n' Wild Waterworld is the site of numerous festivals and concerts performed in a raised stage in the middle of the open picnic area. Private sleep-overs, birthday parties, company picnics, and reserved areas can be arranged for groups.

== History ==
The park opened in 1979 after El Paso businessman and attorney Berry H. Edwards purchased a KOA campground in Anthony. After his son suggested they get a waterslide for the campground's pool, Edwards visited the now closed Wild Wild Wet in Anaheim, California for research. He then installed two Plantation Plastics waterslides (powered by a Chrysler diesel engine connected to a water pump). The park opened as Wet N Wild Waterslides, charging $2.50 per half hour to ride 2 slides, "Blue Streak' and "Corkscrew." In 1980, after adding the 12 foot deep Volcano Lake, a water zip line, and a few more in-house slides, Edwards changed the name to Wet N Wild Waterworld.

== Community Outreach ==
Since 2011, Wet 'n' Wild has also been host to the Christian Castle Lifeguard Olympics, which celebrates local lifeguards while allowing them to fine tune their skills. In 2015, Wet N Wild was awarded Best Of Aquatics 2015 for Community Outreach by Aquatics International Magazine for its efforts in drowning prevention and water safety. The park also participates annually in the World's Largest Swimming Lesson an event dedicated to raising awareness of water safety. During Drowning Prevention Week, the park sends Freddy the Surfing Frog to local schools to give lessons in water safety and drowning prevention.

== See also ==
- List of waterparks
