= Village Roadshow Theme Parks =

Theme park division in Australia

- Type: Division
- Industry: Amusement parks and attractions
- Headquarters: Melbourne, Victoria, Australia
- Key people: Clark Kirby (CEO)
- Revenue: A$302.8 million (2017)
- Operating income: A$55.9 million (2017) million (2009) ▼
- Total assets: A$239 million (2009) ▼
- Parent: Village Roadshow
- Website: Official website

Village Roadshow Theme Parks is a division of Village Roadshow Limited which operates theme parks and attractions in Australia. The Sydney Attractions Group Pty Ltd was formerly part of Village Roadshow Theme Parks; however, it was sold in 2011 to Merlin Entertainments.

== History ==
In 1989, the publicly listed Sea World Property Trust who owned its namesake theme park coordinated a three-way venture to acquire Wet'n'Wild Water World from the Herringe Group of Companies and build the adjacent Warner Bros. Movie World theme park. The two other companies involved in the venture were American multinational media corporation Time Warner and fellow publicly listed Australian firm Village Roadshow Limited. The joint venture known as Warner Village Theme Parks was led by Chief Executive Officer John Menzies. Prior to the formation of the company, Menzies was managing director of Sea World.

In 1992, Pivot Leisure sold its two-thirds stake of the Sea World Property Trust to Time Warner and Village Roadshow Limited. In April 2001, AOL Time Warner and Village Roadshow Limited announced plans to acquire the remaining 31.6% of Sea World Property Trust that they did not already own. This would also mean the ownership of Warner Village Theme Parks would lie entirely with the two firms. However, the takeover bid failed as the two firms were only able to acquire 85.65% of the trust, just shy of the 90% required for compulsory acquisition. A second takeover bid of Sea World Property Trust was put forward in December 2001. This bid was ultimately successful, with compulsory acquisition beginning in February 2002, and the delisting of the Sea World Property Trust from the Australian Securities Exchange in April 2002.

Warner Village Theme Parks remained a joint venture between Time Warner and Village Roadshow until Village took full ownership of the group in 2006. Time Warner (later WarnerMedia, now Warner Bros. Discovery) continues to provide a licence to the Warner Bros. brand. The group was renamed Village Roadshow Theme Parks. The group also owns the Sea World Resort, located next to the Sea World theme park. Previously known as Sea World Nara Resort (opened in 1988 as a joint venture between the then-owners of Sea World and the Japan-based Nara Group, Village also moved to take full ownership of the resort in 2006, resulting in the name change).

=== Local expansion ===
In April 2008, Village Roadshow Theme Parks proposed African Safari World, an amusement park and zoo to replace the Werribee Open Range Zoo, 32 kilometres (20 mi) southwest of Melbourne, Victoria, Australia. This was followed by the proposal to acquire and redevelop Aussie World into Wet'n'Wild Aussie World. In June 2008, the proposal for African Safari World was rejected by the Victorian Government for a variety of reasons. In September 2009, the plans for Wet'n'Wild Aussie World were cancelled.

In late 2008, Sydney Attractions Group was purchased by Village Roadshow after months of discussions. This included the acquisition of Sydney Aquarium, Sydney Tower and Sydney Wildlife World. The company further expanded its interests in local attractions in 2009, with the purchase of Oceanworld Manly in Australia and Kelly Tarlton's Underwater World in New Zealand.

In December 2010, they announced that they would sell approximately $115 million worth of assets to Merlin Entertainments. On 3 March 2011, the deal was finalised with Sydney Aquarium, Sydney Wildlife World, Oceanworld Manly, Sydney Tower, Hamilton Island Wildlife Park and Kelly Tarlton's Underwater World all being sold off.

In September 2010, Village Roadshow announced that they would be expanding the Wet'n'Wild chain by opening a water park in Sydney.

=== International expansion ===
In 2008, Village Roadshow expanded into the international market, with the acquisition of the Hawaiian Waters Adventure Park in the United States. The park was rebranded to Wet'n'Wild Hawaii the following year. At around the same time, the company also purchased WaterWorld Safari, investing $30 million in the park relaunched as Wet'n'Wild Phoenix. Village Roadshow's ownership of Wet'n'Wild Hawaii was short-lived. The park was sold to CNL Lifestyle Properties for an undisclosed sum in 2009. Village Roadshow Theme Parks, however, continued to operate the park on a lease which concluded in November 2013.

On 4 October 2012, it was announced that Village Roadshow Theme Parks would be opening Wet'n'Wild Las Vegas in May 2013. The park sold out of season passes and reached capacity many days surrounding its opening.

On 17 October 2012, it was announced that the company had struck a deal with Guangzhou R&F Properties to assist in the design, construction and operation of two parks in China. The two parks would be based on the Sea World and Wet'n'Wild parks on the Gold Coast, Queensland and would be named Hainan R&F Ocean Paradise and Hainan Wet'n'Wild.

In November 2013, CNL Lifestyle Properties purchased Wet'n'Wild Phoenix, with Premier Parks, LLC taking over operations of both Wet'n'Wild Phoenix and Wet'n'Wild Hawaii for the 2014 season. In addition, CNL Lifestyle Properties also purchased the rights to the Wet'n'Wild brand in the United States, which was later used for the company's Palm Springs water park. Village Roadshow Theme Parks will continue to operate and hold a majority stake in ownership of Wet'n'Wild Las Vegas. In a press release, the company stated the water park market in the United States was too mature, and that they would be pursuing other opportunities in Asia.

On 16 July 2014, Village Roadshow Theme Parks signed a partnership with 20th Century Fox Consumer Products to open the second 20th Century Fox World theme park in South Korea in 2018. This partnership however didn't end up going anywhere, even more so in 2019 when Disney purchased 21st Century Fox, which had fully ended the deal.

== Properties ==
=== Current ===
- Australian Outback Spectacular is an Australiana dinner and show package featuring many Australian animals, songs and bush tucker. The show is located between Warner Bros. Movie World and Wet'n'Wild Water World at Oxenford on the Gold Coast.
- Paradise Country is an Australian Farm experience where guests are shown a variety of Australian animals including koalas, kangaroos and emus. The farm tour also includes several shows which feature the making of billy tea, a stock horse demonstration and a boomerang throwing demonstration.
- Sea World is a marine mammal park, oceanarium, and theme park located on the Gold Coast, Queensland, Australia. It includes rides, animal exhibits and other attractions, and promotes conservation through education and through the rescue and rehabilitation of sick, injured or orphaned wildlife. The park also offers accommodation at an adjacent resort, helicopter flights, whale watching tours, calm-water cruises and children's books.
- Topgolf is a golf entertainment complex that opened in 2018 at Oxenford. Visitors can challenge friends/family to various point-scoring golf games in a driving range format, but with dartboard-like targets in the ground.
- Warner Bros. Movie World is a popular movie related theme park on the Gold Coast. Opened on 3 June 1991, the park contains various movie-themed rides and attractions ranging from motion simulators to roller coasters and slow river rides. In addition, costumed character performers also patrol the park, giving visitors the chance to take photos with them. These include Batman, Superman, Austin Powers, Marilyn Monroe, Scooby-Doo, The Mystery Inc. Gang and various Looney Tunes characters.
- Wet'n'Wild Gold Coast is a large water park situated in the suburb of Oxenford on the Gold Coast. The park is Australia's largest waterpark and the third largest waterpark in the world. While the park remains open all year, all pools and slides are heated during winter.
- Wet'n'Wild Haikou is a water park in the Chinese province of Hainan. R&F Properties owns the park and Village Roadshow designed, constructed and operates the park.
- Hainan R&F Ocean Paradise is theme park and water park that opened in December 2018 in the Chinese province of Hainan. R&F Properties will own the park which is to be designed, constructed and operated by Village Roadshow. The two parks will be based on Sea World and Wet'n'Wild on the Gold Coast.

=== Former ===
- Hamilton Island Wildlife Park (now Wild Life Hamilton Island) is a small wildlife park situated on Hamilton Island in Queensland, Australia. Guests are able to view a large collection of native Australian animals including koalas, kangaroos, wallabies, crocodiles, wombats, Tasmanian devils, frilled necked lizards and various reptiles.
- Kelly Tarlton's Underwater World is a public aquarium in Auckland, New Zealand, which was the brainchild of renowned New Zealand marine archaeologist and diver Kelly Tarlton.
- Oceanworld Manly (now Manly Sea Life Sanctuary) is located just 200 metres (660 ft) from Manly Wharf in Sydney, new South Wales, Australia. It features aquariums including sharks, giant stingrays, sea turtles and other marine life. Oceanworld also allows guests to take part in Shark Dive Xtreme, where they can swim with sharks.
- Sydney Aquarium (now Sea Life Sydney Aquarium) is a public aquarium located in the city of Sydney, New South Wales, Australia. It is located on the eastern (city) side of Darling Harbour to the north of the Pyrmont Bridge. It contains a large variety of Australian aquatic life, displaying more than 650 species comprising more than 6,000 individual fish and other sea and water creatures from most of Australia's water habitats.
- Sydney Tower (now Sydney Tower Eye) is Sydney's tallest free-standing structure which is home to the second tallest observation tower in the Southern Hemisphere. The tower is also home to the Skywalk (where guests can walk around the top of the building outdoors) and OzTrek (a virtual reality ride).
- Sydney Wildlife World (now Wild Life Sydney) is a wildlife park in the centre of the city of Sydney, Australia. Officially opened in September 2006, it is located on the city side of the Darling Harbour leisure and retail precinct, next to Sydney Aquarium. The wildlife park features a wide collection of animals including butterflies, invertebrates, reptiles, koalas as well as specifically designed habitats including semi-arid grasslands and a rainforest.
- Wet'n'Wild Hawaii is a Hawaiian water park, located in the Oahu city Kapolei. Opened in May 1999, the park occupies 25 acres (10 ha) of land and has 25 rides and attractions. It was the first overseas acquisition of Village Roadshow.
- Wet'n'Wild Phoenix (now Six Flags Hurricane Harbor Phoenix) is a water park located in Phoenix, Arizona in the United States. It opened its doors to the public 1 July 2009 after Village Roadshow invested over US$30 million in the park. The park features over 30 rides on approximately 35 acres (14 ha) of land making it the largest theme park in the state.
- Wet'n'Wild Las Vegas is a water park in Spring Valley, Nevada, United States. It was the company's third Wet'n'Wild park in the United States when it opened in May 2013. Sold to Pyek Group in March 2022.
- Wet'n'Wild Sydney (now Raging Waters Sydney) is a water park in Western Sydney, more specifically in Prospect, New South Wales, Australia. Announced on 11 September 2010, the park includes 3 pools, 16 water slides and 2 children's areas on a 25-hectare (62-acre) site. The A$80 million park is set to be one of the top ten water parks in the world. Sold to Parques Reunidos in July 2018.

== Results ==
The group claimed an annual patronage of approximately 4.2 million across all of its properties during the financial year ending on 30 June 2007, including 1.3 million each to both Movie World and Sea World, and 1 million to Wet'n'Wild.

== See also ==
- Village Roadshow
