= Wet'n'Wild Gold Coast =

Water park on the Gold Coast, Australia

- Interactive map of Wet'n'Wild Gold Coast
- Slogan: Biggest 'n' Best
- Location: Oxenford, Queensland, Australia
- Coordinates: 27.9151076°S 153.3176744°E
- Owner: Village Roadshow Theme Parks
- Opened: 30 September 1984
- Previous names: Cade's County Waterpark^{(1984–1985)} Cade's County Wet'n'Wild^{(1985–1986)} Wet'n'Wild^{(1986–1997)} Wet'n'Wild Water World^{(1997–2013)}
- Operating season: All year, heated in winter
- Pools: 4 pools
- Water slides: 17 water slides
- Children's areas: 2 children's areas
- Website: www.wetnwild.com.au

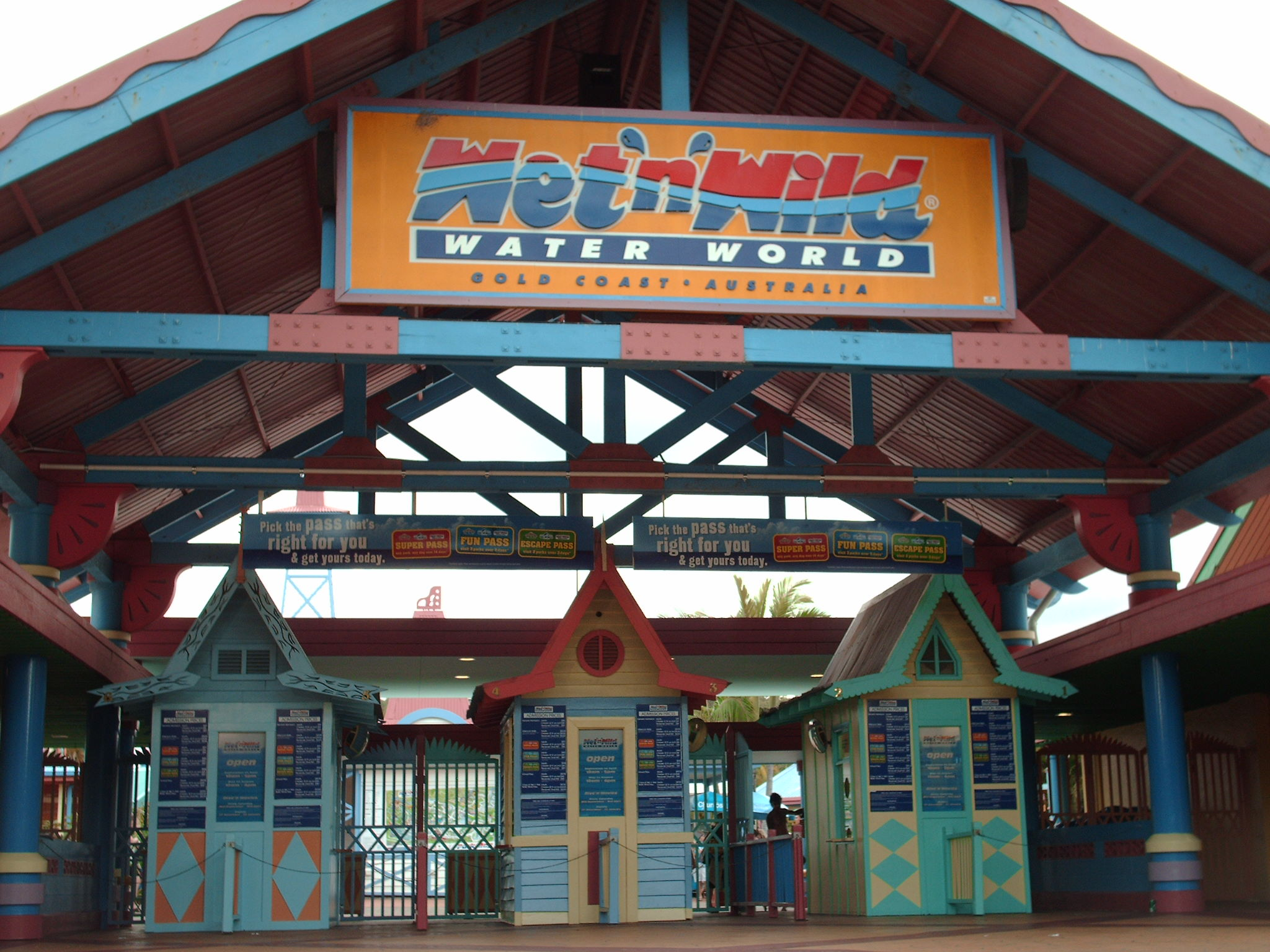
The entrance to Wet'n'Wild Gold Coast when it was known as Wet'n'Wild Water World

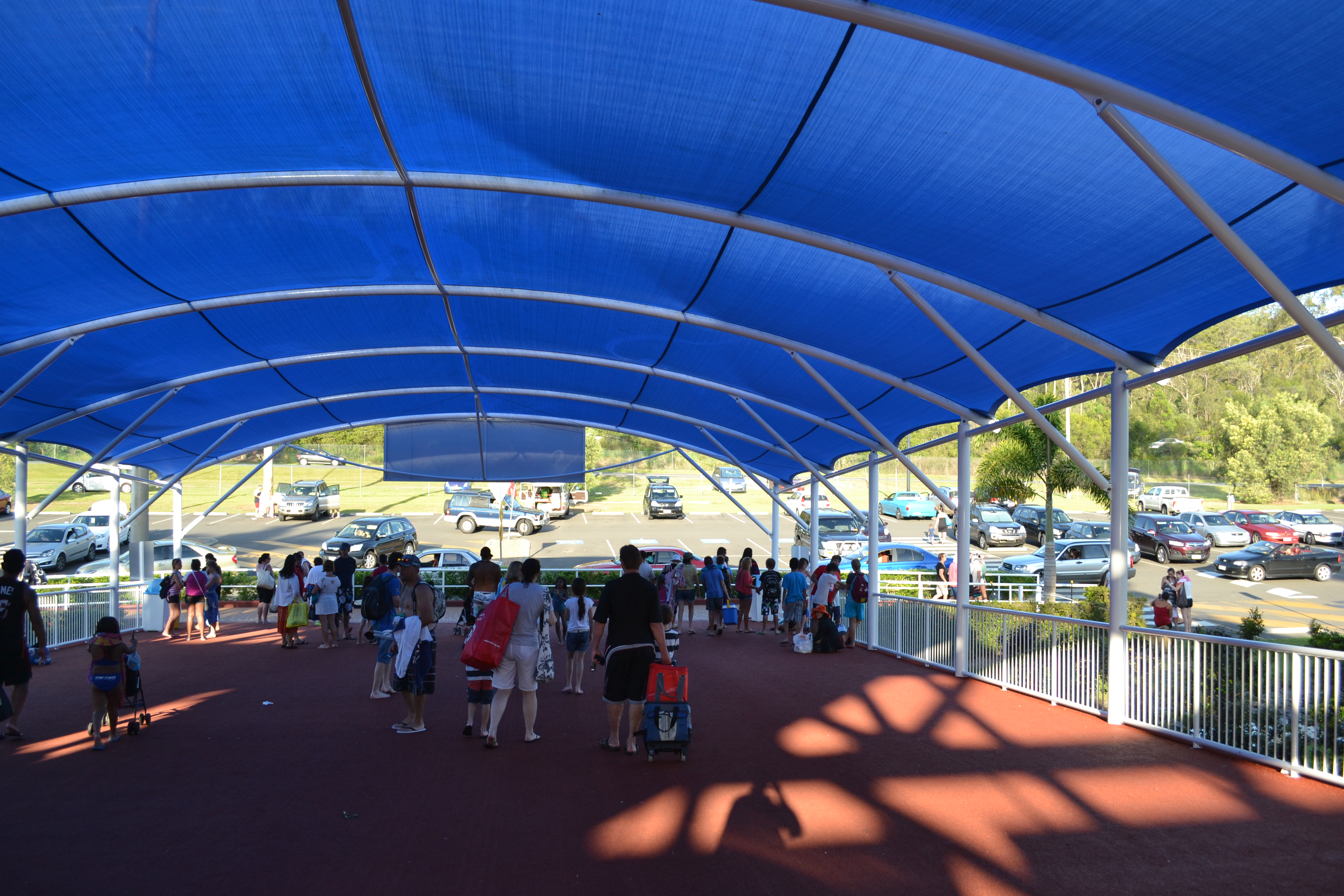
The large entrance walkway/queue with cover

Wet'n'Wild Gold Coast is a water park situated in Oxenford, Gold Coast, Queensland, Australia, owned and operated by Village Roadshow Theme Parks. In 2019, the park received 1,120,000 visitors making it the most visited water park in Australia and the 19th most visited water park in the world. Wet'n'Wild Gold Coast is located adjacent to Warner Bros. Movie World, a movie-related park also owned by Village Roadshow Theme Parks. The park remains open all year with some seasonal ride closures and maintenance periods in winter. It is one of several water parks operating under the Wet'n'Wild brand globally.

== History ==
The original park, called Cade's County was the brainchild of Colin Herringe. The concept of Cade's County WaterPark was conceived after years of researching hundreds of other waterparks around the world. Many of the original pools and slides were improvements on similar popular rides found in parks such as Wet'n'Wild Orlando, White Waters Garland TX, and NaraWorld Japan. Construction began in 1982 and at time of construction was the largest WaterPark in the Southern Hemisphere. The original name Cade's County Waterpark was named after Herringe's son Cade.

Under ownership of Village Roadshow Theme Parks, the park changed its name to Wet'n'Wild Water World to match the related Sea World and Warner Bros. Movie World theme parks. In 2013, to distinguish the park from Wet'n'Wild Sydney, the park's name was changed to Wet'n'Wild Gold Coast.

Scenes set at a water park (fictionally called "Splash Planet") in The Inbetweeners 2, a 2014 British comedy film, were filmed at the park.

=== Attraction history ===
Year	Attraction(s)	Notes
1984	White Water Mountain	Opened.
1984	Giant Wave Pool	Opened.
1984	Double flume speed slide	Opened.
1984	Rampage Toboggan twin racers	Demolished for children's pool area.
1984	Childrens Activity Pool	Opened.
1997	Calypso Beach & Super 8 Aqua Racer	Both opened.
1999	Terror Canyon II	Opened.
2000	Mammoth Falls	Opened featuring Mammoth Plunge and Mammoth River.
2002	Whirlpool	Opened.
2005	Double Screamer	Closed. Demolished for the Buccaneer Bay revamp.
2005	Mammoth Falls	Mammoth Plunge was closed and moved to Sea World with a replacement Mammoth River opening.
2005	Buccaneer Bay	Revamp completed, opened in September.
2006	Extreme H_{2}O Zone	Opened in stages. Mach 5 opened first featuring the Jet Streams and Sidewinders. This was followed shortly by Blackhole and then finally Tornado in September.
2007	White Water Mountain	Retired, replaced with 4 new body slides now known as River Rapids.
2007	Surfrider & River Rapids	Both opened.
2008	Kamikaze	Opened on 1 October.
2009	Terror Canyon & Terror Canyon II	Both closed on 1 December. Demolished to make way for a new attraction.
2010	Speed Coaster & Twister	Both closed. Demolished to make way for a new attraction.
2010	AquaLoop & FlowRider	Opened in September 2010, and demolished in 2024 to be replaced with new Zoom Zone slides
2011	SkyCoaster	Opened in March.
2011	Zip Line	Opened in April.
2012	Constrictor	Opened on 28 September. Built where Terror Canyon & Terror Canyon II used to stand.
2012	Dive in Movies	Closed late 2012 along with all references to Dive in Movies removed from the old projection booth.
2014	Wet'n'Wild Junior	Area behind Buccaneer Bay under construction for a new area called Wet'n'Wild Junior.
2014	Wet'n'Wild Junior	Opened on 22 September.
2017	Wet'n'Wild Buggy	Opened on 4 January.
2018	Mach 5	Closed late 2018.
2021	Kaboom!, Double Barrel, Super Ripper and H2Oasis	Opened on 10 December 2021.
2023	Surfrider	Closed in April 2023 Ride Was Moved to Movie World as The Flash: Speed Force

== Attractions ==
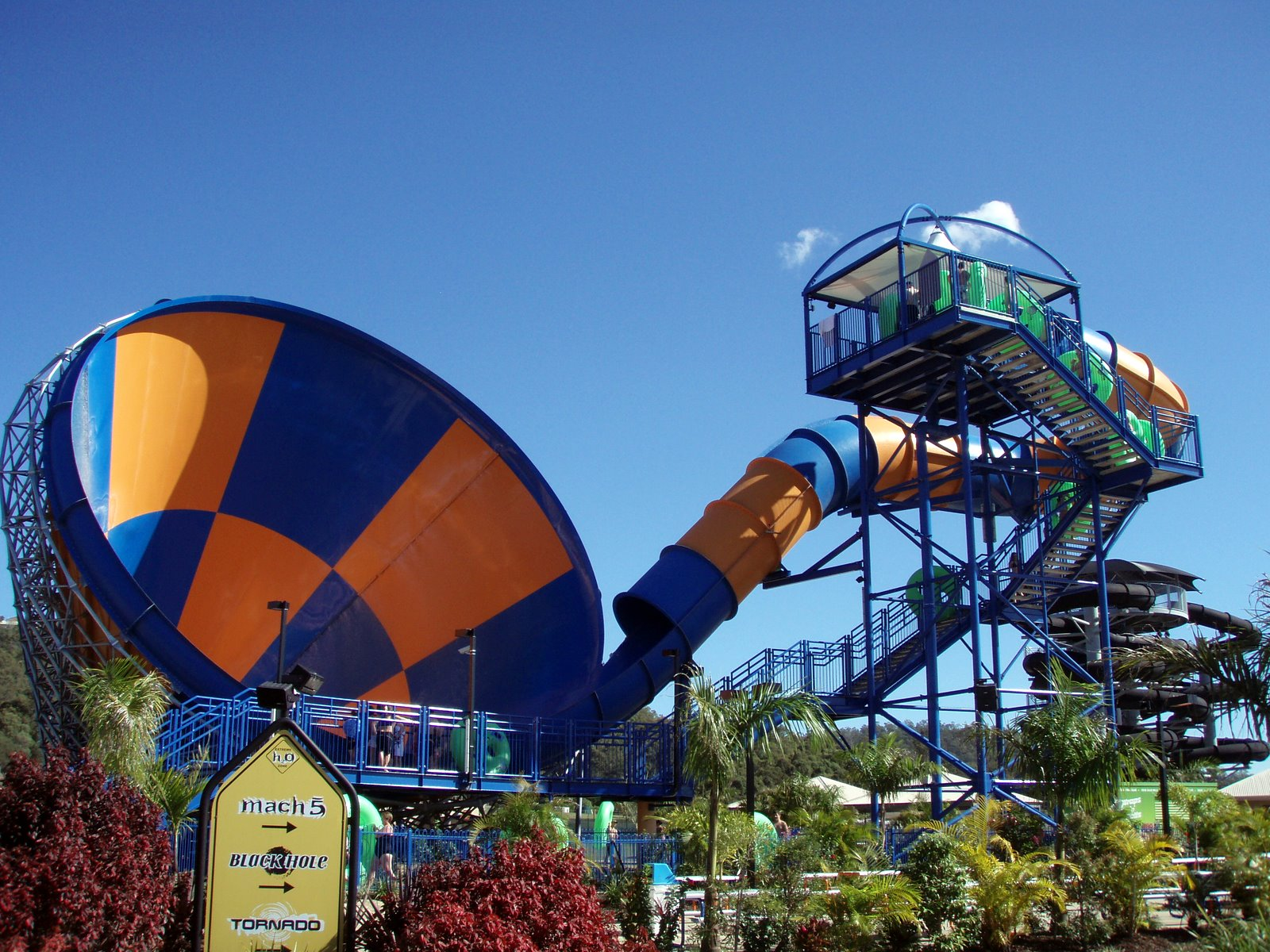
Tornado

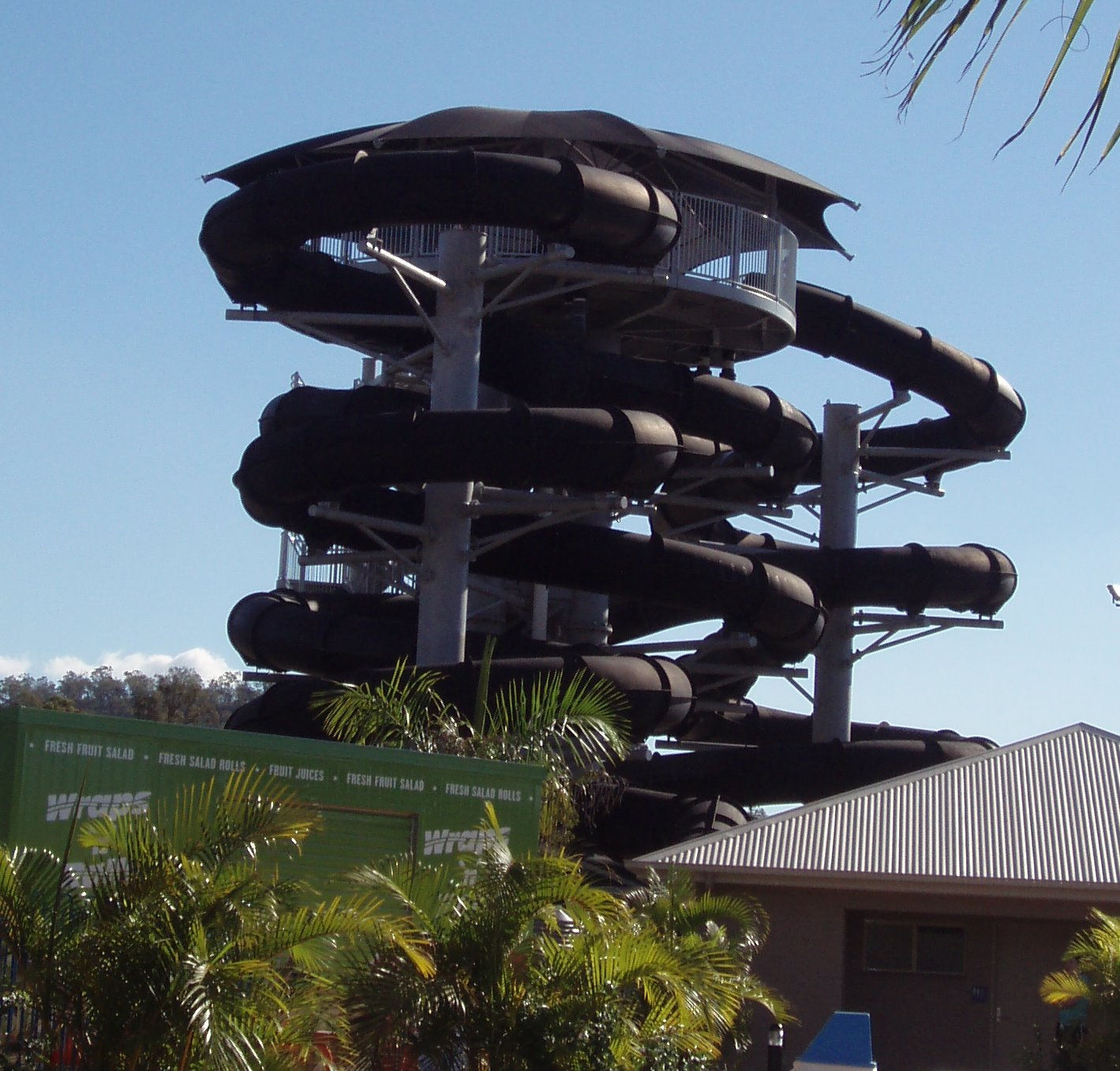
Blackhole

In selected peak seasons (such as the 2012–2013 summer season) Wet'n'Wild Gold Coast offers Fast Track, a system where guests could get to the front of a ride's line in exchange for a set fee. A similar system is in operation at Warner Bros. Movie World.

=== Extreme H_{2}O Zone ===
The Extreme H_{2}O Zone first opened at the back of the park for during 2006 with three rides with staggered openings. It features attractions including a funnel slide, enclosed and open tube slides and a large body slide complex.

- Kamikaze is a unique wet and dry attraction and the first of its kind in the Southern Hemisphere. The Kamikaze is two U-shaped half pipe slides which are wet through a water channel to reduce friction. Riders are seated in two-person, inwards facing tubes and are launched down a steep slope before coming back up the other side, and so continue in a boomerang-like fashion until they run out of speed and momentum. The Kamikaze opened in late September 2008. The ride is a Water fun Products Sidewinder.
- Tornado is a four-person clover-leaf funnel slide. The Tornado dips down and then goes into a turn before speeding down a steep drop into the funnel below, reaching speeds of up to 40 km/h. The Tornado was designed and built by a Canadian waterslide manufacturer, ProSlide and opened at the park as the third attraction in the Extreme H_{2}O Zone in 2006.
- Blackhole is two enclosed tube slides twisting and turning around each other. Riders are immersed in complete darkness as they traverse down the slide reaching high speeds. The Blackhole was acquired second hand from a defunct waterpark in Brazil and opened at the park as the second attraction in the Extreme H_{2}O Zone in 2006.

=== Other rides ===
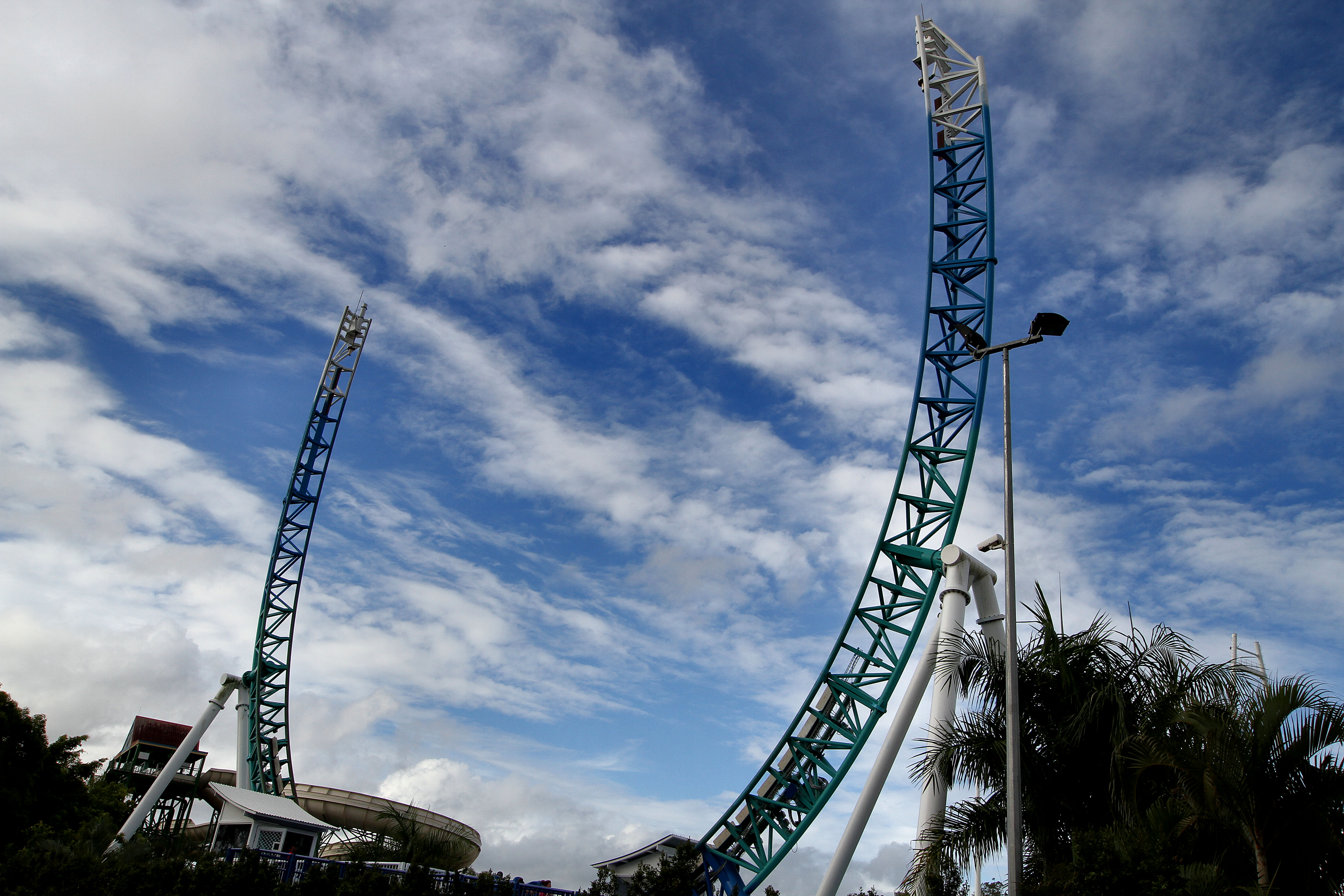
Surfrider

- Calypso Beach is a large lazy river attraction. Riders sit in one person tubes as the gentle current pulls them along the course. Calypso Beach was installed at the park in 1997.
- Constrictor is a 3-person water slide that stands 18.37 metres (60.3 ft) high, is 166.7 metres (547 ft) long and has a top speed of 30 kilometres per hour (19 mph). It features a trio of corkscrew turns throughout the enclosed slide. It replaced the Terror Canyon slides.
- Giant Wave Pool is a three million litre wave pool attraction with a consistent one-metre swell. The Giant Wave Pool is one of the park's first attractions and opened in 1984 along with the rest of the park. The Giant Wave Pool featured 'Dive-in Movies' every Saturday night during the summer season, where guests could view movies from a tube dinghy in the water or deck chair on the shore. However this was discontinued following the 2011-2012 summer season. But has since been recontinued
- Mammoth Falls opened in 2000 and are two six person raft slides built by Australian Waterslides and Leisure. The tower featured two different slides – one featured a series of inline drops to the finish (known as Mammoth Plunge) while the other featured several corners (known as Mammoth River). In 2005 the 263-foot-long (80 m) Mammoth Plunge slide was moved to Sea World and changed its name to The Plunge. After the Mammoth Plunge slide was moved, the Mammoth River attraction was mirrored. Mammoth Falls now features two slides with identical 658-foot-long (201 m) layouts. The original two slides cost AU$2.25 million to build.
- River Rapids are four high speed body slides which opened in 2007 and are located on Whitewater Mountain. Whitewater Mountain originally housed the Whitewater Flumes which slowly deteriorated since 1984 when the park opened. The River Rapids are two fully enclosed water slides and two open air flumes.
- Skycoaster is an upcharge located near the front of the park by Mammoth Falls. Riders are raised to a height of 50 metres (160 ft) before plunging at 60 kilometres per hour (37 mph) and swinging out across the Giant Wave Pool. The ride was manufactured by Skycoaster, Inc., a wholly owned division of Ride Entertainment Group, who installed the ride.
- Super 8 Aqua Racer, as the name suggests, is an eight lane timed mat racer slide. Riders reach speeds of up to 40 km/h as they race headfirst down an 86-metre long track. With the help of sensors at the finish line, each slider receives their placing to an accuracy of 1/1000 of a second.
- Wet'n'Wild Junior is a new area featuring versions of many of Wet'n'Wild's slides designed for young children.
- Whirlpool Hot Springs. During the winter months the upper level of the original Whirlpool attraction has the water drained and covers removed to expose 10 x 20 person hot spas heated at 36 degrees Celsius. In the 2009/2010 summer season, it appears the attraction remained as the Whirlpool Hot Springs. It is unknown whether the original summer attraction, Whirlpool, will return.

=== Previous rides ===
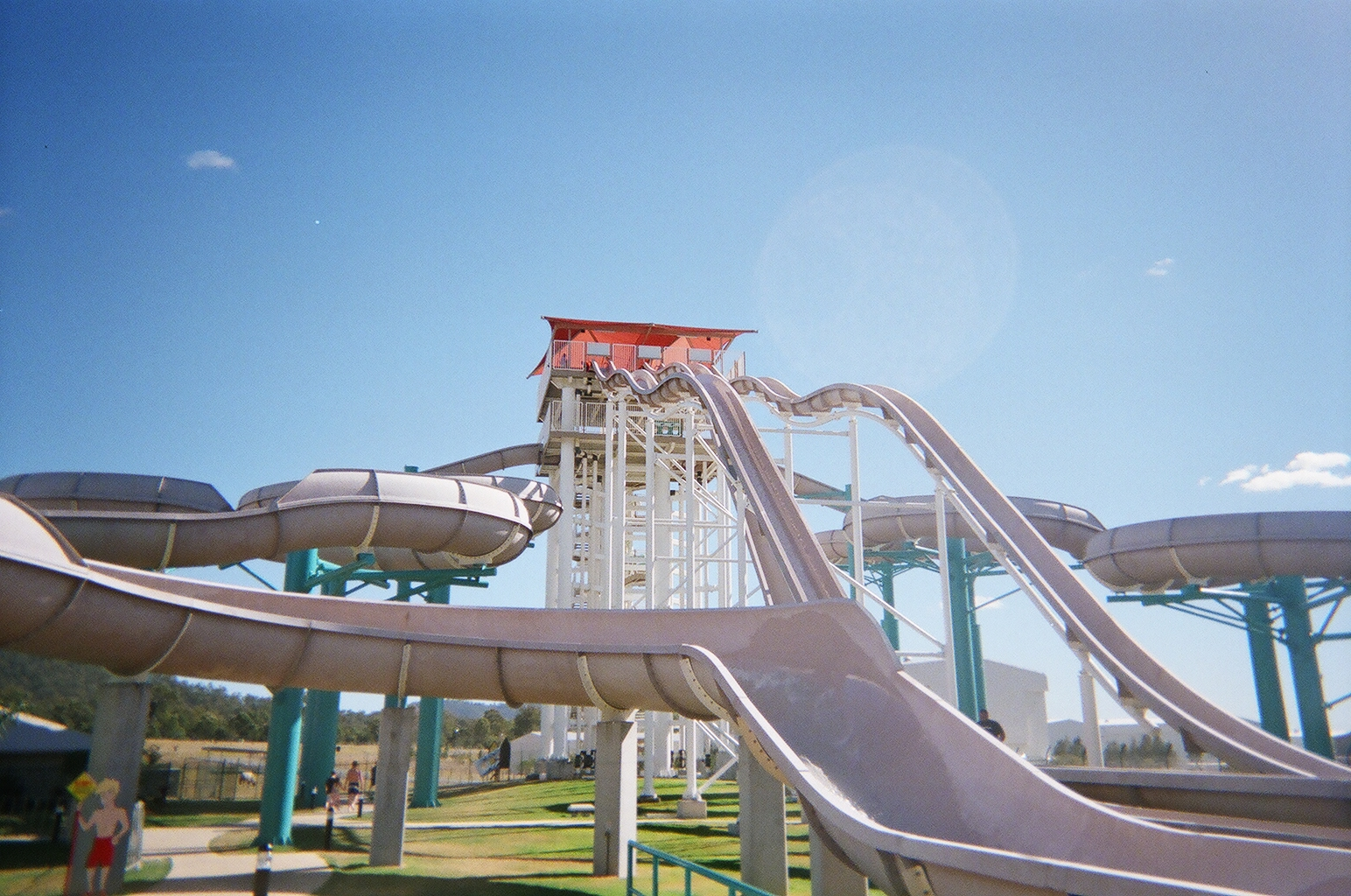
Mach 5

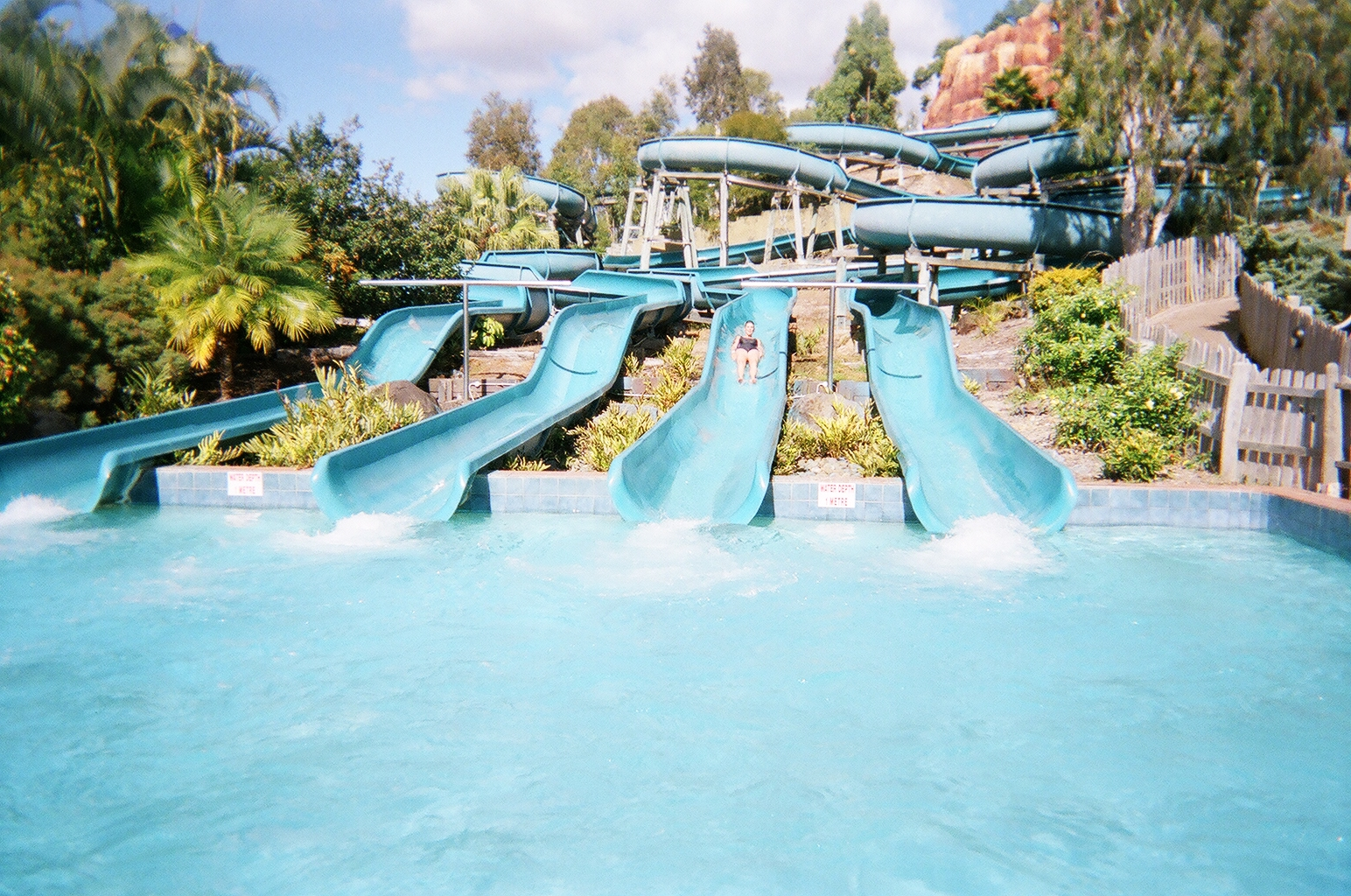
White Water Mountain

- AquaLoop was a collection of four looping body slides featuring a trap door release with 2.5G acceleration. Riders reached a top speed of 60 kilometres per hour (37 mph). The AquaLoop was the first ride of its type in Australia.
- Buccaneer Bay was a pirate themed children's play area. The area is divided into two sections. One section is an Aqua Play structure featuring water sides and activities while the other is a series of shallow pools. The original Buccaneer Bay featured shallow pools, small climbing structures and water guns. It closed mid Autumn 2005. During construction a smaller, temporary children's area (named Kokomo Cove) opened instead of Whirlpool Hot Springs for the Winter season. The current Buccaneer Bay opened in September 2005.
- Mach 5 was a large water slide complex, divided up amongst five different slides. The Sidewinders are two open flume slides which twist down to the bottom around the outside of the complex. The Jetstreams are three high speed body slides. The central slide is a freefall to the splashdown area below, similar to the Summit Plummet at Disney's Blizzard Beach. The outer two are similar, but traverse down the slope in a snake-like fashion. The Mach 5 was acquired second hand from a defunct waterpark in Brazil (Wet 'n Wild Rio de Janeiro) and opened at the park the first attraction in the Extreme H_{2}O Zone in 2006. Following unsuccessful maintenance in December 2018, Mach 5 is now closed permanently. Mach 5 has been replaced by a new slide grouping consisting of Kaboom!, Double Barrel and Super Ripper.
- Double Screamer was originally named Rampage, the Double Screamer was the first all fibreglass slide in the world. It was closed and removed in 2005 due to safety concerns on similar rides overseas where riders suffered serious injuries. It was also removed to make way for an expanded Buccaneer Bay which now stands in its place.
- Mammoth Plunge was built in 2000, the Mammoth Plunge Slide was donated to Sea World in 2005 where it now operates. It was replaced with a mirror of the adjacent Mammoth River slide.
- Speedcoaster saw guests plummet down an enclosed snake-like drop before a steep freefall to the splashdown zone. Originally named 'Speed Slide' when the park first opened, the attraction has since been refurbished and modified. This ride was closed to make way for the addition of AquaLoop in 2010. This ride was moved to Big Splash in Canberra.
- Speed Slide was a pair of high speed body slides that existed where the Speedcoaster once stood, and where the AquaLoop now stands. The slides were also home to a stunt show which saw performers ride the slide standing up and on boards.
- Surfrider was an Intamin designed "Half-Pipe" roller coaster. The car was in the shape of a surfboard and was launched to either side of the half-pipe using an LIM-powered mechanism. Several water features were included to simulate riding a wave. The ride opened in September 2007 and closed in 2020. It was removed in April 2023, pending relocation to Warner Bros. Movie World later in the year.
- Terror Canyon 1 & 2 was closed down in 2008 pending demolition, extended maintenance or re-development. In 2009, the park confirmed that the Terror Canyon location could be used for future attractions. In 2010, the rides were removed from the park map with the queue and station being used for the zip lines.
- Twister was an attraction featuring two body slides. These slides wrap around each other forming a twisted pattern from the outside. This ride was closed to make way for the addition of AquaLoop in 2010. This ride was moved to Big Splash in Canberra.
- Wet'n'Wild Buggy was a "tomcar" buggy car attraction where guests can drive over a course through the bush featuring log obstacles, tyre grids, jumps, water splashes, walls, and a tunnel.
- Whirlpool was located at the same location of Whirlpool Hot Springs. The attraction was only open in the summer months as a gentle one person per tube ride revolving in a circular pattern. In the 2009/2010 summer season, it appears the attraction remained as the Whirlpool Hot Springs. It is unknown whether Whirlpool will return.
- WhiteWater Mountain were 4 body flume slides opened with the park in 1984, refurbished in the 1990s, and removed in 2007. It featured slides named Cascade, Bombora, Riptide and Pipeline.
- Zip Lines was a series of 3 zip lines travelling from the top of White Water Mountain to the Giant Wave Pool, travelling over 200 metres (660 ft).

== Food, beverage and merchandise ==
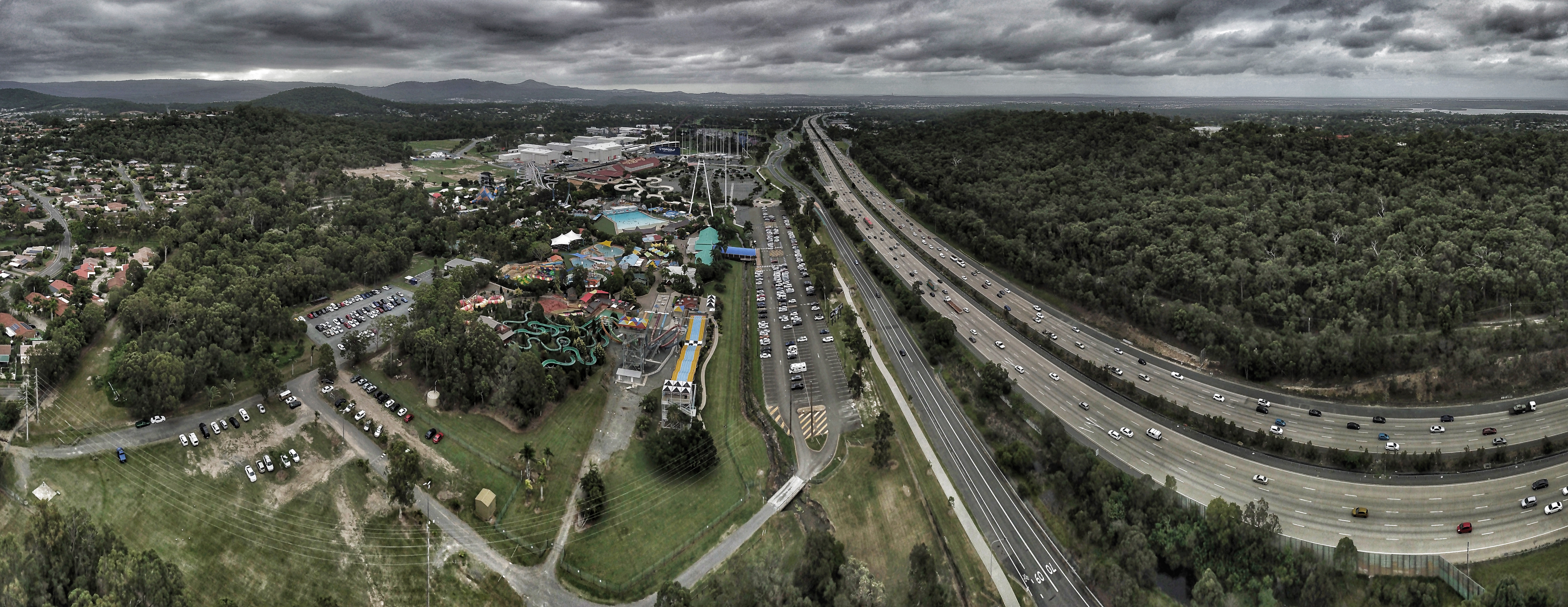
Aerial panorama of Wet and Wild and its immediate surrounds on a cloudy autumn day. 2018.

There are several food outlets placed throughout the park, each one specialising in different styles of fast food:

- Bombora Burger Bar
- Twisted: DIY Soft Serve
- Oasis Ice Cream Parlour
- Go Frozen" Frozen Coke Bar
- Wraps 'n' Rolls
- Natural Selections
- Village Bean Cafe
- The Tiki Bar
- Dominos 2 Go (Opened as a franchise on 12 September 2009)

There are two merchandise stores placed towards the front of the park.

- Surf Store
- Quiksilver

== See also ==
- Village Roadshow Theme Parks
- WhiteWater World
- Wet'n'Wild Hawaii
