= Six Flags Hurricane Harbor Phoenix =

Water park in Phoenix, Arizona

- Interactive map of Six Flags Hurricane Harbor Phoenix
- Slogan: Arizona's Most Thrilling Water Park
- Location: Phoenix, Arizona, United States
- Coordinates: 33.695878°N 112.150272°W
- Owner: EPR Properties
- Operated by: Six Flags
- Opened: July 1, 2009; 17 years ago
- Previous names: WaterWorld Safari (1993–2009); Wet ‘n’ Wild Phoenix (2009–2019)
- Operating season: Mid March - Mid October
- Status: Operating
- Area: 35 acres (14 ha)
- Pools: 2 pools
- Water slides: 7 water slides
- Children's areas: 3 children's areas
- Website: Six Flags Hurricane Harbor Phoenix

Six Flags Hurricane Harbor Phoenix is a 35-acre (14 ha) water park located in Phoenix, Arizona, United States, as part of the Adobe Dam Regional Park complex. Owned by EPR Properties and operated by Six Flags, it is the largest theme park in the state, with seven water slides and two pools. It originally opened as WaterWorld Safari in 1993, before it was rebranded to Wet'n'Wild Phoenix in 2009, before it became part of the Six Flags Hurricane Harbor water park chain in 2019.

== History ==
Six Flags Hurricane Harbor Phoenix originally opened on the site of WaterWorld Safari. WaterWorld Safari opened in May 1993 and continued operation until early 2009.

Directly following WaterWorld’s closure, Village Roadshow Limited invested over $30 million in the park taking ownership, and adding new attractions. Wet'n'Wild Phoenix opened its doors to the public on July 1, 2009. At opening the park had over 30 rides. In November 2013, CNL Lifestyle Properties purchased Wet'n'Wild Phoenix from Village Roadshow, along with the rights for the Wet'n'Wild brand in the United States. CNL Lifestyle Properties previously purchased Wet'n'Wild Hawaii from Village Roadshow, with both properties set to be operated by Premier Parks, LLC from the 2014 season.

Management of the park was subsequently taken over by Six Flags and in 2019 it changed its name to Six Flags Hurricane Harbor Phoenix.

Due to concerns of the COVID-19 pandemic, Six Flags announced a suspension of operations across the company on March 13, 2020. Six Flags Hurricane Harbor Phoenix was scheduled to open for the 2020 season a day later on March 14. The water park opened the 2020 season on June 12, the first Six Flags water park to do so with new rules and regulations. By June 29, the state government made an order that water parks that were currently operating in the state, had to close again due to the uprising in COVID-19 cases in the state. In early August, Six Flags announced that the rest of the 2020 operating season had been canceled and that Six Flags Hurricane Harbor Phoenix looks forward to open again in 2021. The water park reopened again, the following season on March 13, 2021.

== Rides ==
=== Thrill ===
- Anaconda
- Bahama Blaster
- Bonzai Pipelines
- Mammoth Falls
- Tornado
- Typhoon Twister/Serpentine Complex

=== Family ===
- Adventure River (lazy river)
- Big Kahuna
- Hurricane Bay
- Paradise Island
- Wahoo Racers

=== Kids ===
- Coconut Bay
- Soak 'em Playground
- Splash Island
- Splashwater Beach
- Bonzai Racers
