= Tornado (ProSlide ride) =

Type of water slide

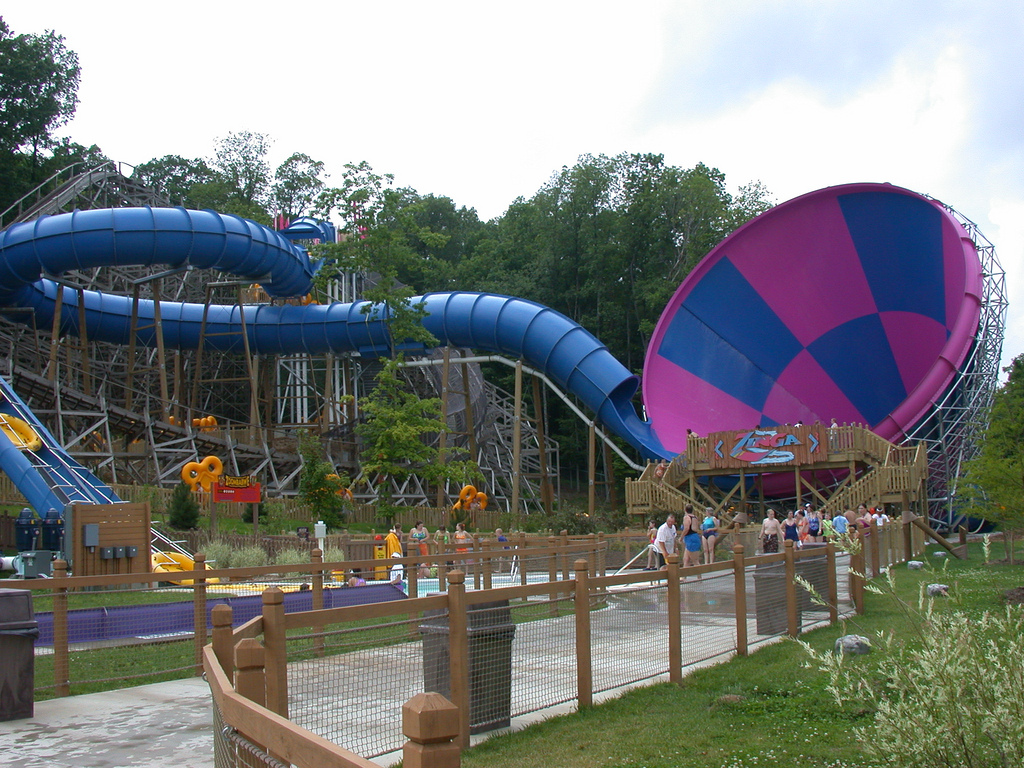
- The first Tornado, Zinga at Splashin' Safari

General statistics
- Manufacturer: ProSlide Technology
- Course: Funnel
- Speed: 20 mph (32 km/h)
- Max vertical angle: 45°
- Capacity: 720 riders per hour
- Installations: 97

The Tornado is a water slide manufactured by ProSlide Technology. It requires riders to sit in a 2-6 seater round tube. Riders drop from inside a tunnel at a 45-degree angle out into the ride's main element shaped like a funnel on its side. Riders oscillate from one side to the other until they exit through the back of the funnel and into a splash pool. Many of the slides feature a conveyor belt to bring the rafts to the top. On April 13, 2012 it was announced the first six-person Tornado would be built using Hydromagnetic technology.

== Installations ==
The first Tornado slides opened at Mountain Creek Waterpark, Six Flags Hurricane Harbor: New England and Splashin' Safari in 2003. Since then, ProSlide has installed 97 Tornados.

== Awards ==
- Zinga, Splashin' Safari, Best Waterpark Ride, 2003
- Super Tornado, Chimelong Paradise, International Best New Waterpark Ride, 2006
- Tornado slides have occasionally ranked in the Top 5 Waterpark Rides such as Zinga at Splashin' Safari
- Several other Tornado slides have ranked in the Top 5 New Waterpark Rides such as Funnel of Fear at WildWater Adventure
