= The Voyage (roller coaster) =

Wooden roller coaster at Holiday World

Holiday World & Splashin' Safari
- Location: Holiday World & Splashin' Safari
- Park section: Thanksgiving
- Coordinates: 38.1213°N 86.9115°W
- Status: Operating
- Opening date: May 6, 2006
- Cost: US$6.5 Million

General statistics
- Type: Wood
- Manufacturer: The Gravity Group
- Designer: Mike Graham, Korey Kiepert, Larry Bill, Chad Miller, Will Koch
- Track layout: Out-and-back, terrain
- Lift/launch system: Chain lift hill
- Height: 159 ft (48 m)
- Drop: 154 ft (47 m)
- Length: 6,442 ft (1,964 m)
- Speed: 67 mph (108 km/h)
- Inversions: 0
- Duration: 2:45
- Max vertical angle: 66°
- Capacity: 1200 riders per hour
- Height restriction: 48 in (122 cm)
- Trains: 2 trains with 6 cars; riders arranged 2 across in 2 rows for a total of 24 riders per train
- Must transfer from wheelchair
- The Voyage at RCDB

The Voyage is a wooden roller coaster located at Holiday World & Splashin' Safari in Santa Claus, Indiana. Designed and built by The Gravity Group with the help of designers Mike Graham, Korey Kiepert, Larry Bill, Chad Miller, and former park president Will Koch, the hybrid coaster is themed to the famous voyage of the Mayflower by Pilgrims to North America in 1620. It opened to the public on May 6, 2006. It is widely considered one of the best wooden roller coasters ever built, and was acclaimed by TIME magazine as the best roller coaster in the world in 2013.

Among all wooden coasters, The Voyage ranks second in length and sixth in height, featuring a track length of 6,442 feet (1,964 m) and a maximum height of 159 feet (48 m). Additionally, its 24.3 seconds of airtime is the most on any wooden coaster to date. Another unique record it holds is for most underground tunnels on any coaster, as it features five. In 2006, it won the Golden Ticket Award for Best New Ride from Amusement Today, which also ranked The Voyage as the "Best Wooden Roller Coaster" from 2007 through 2011 and again in 2026. It continues to remain in the top 5 wooden roller coasters worldwide in these rankings.

== History ==
=== Development ===
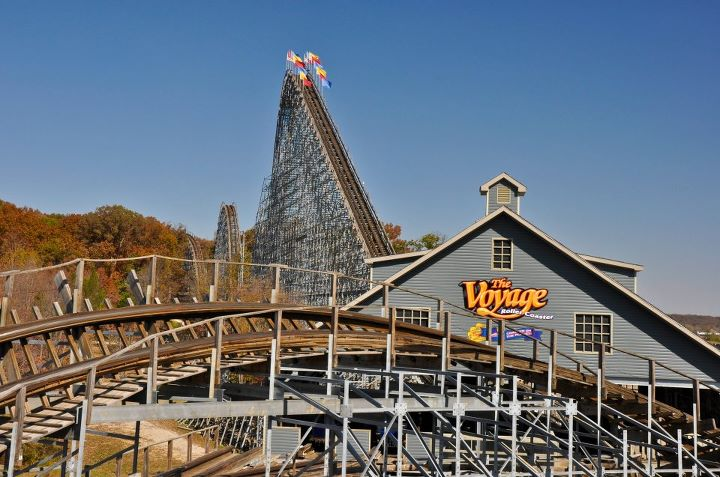
The Voyage's lift hill and station

On July 13, 2005, Holiday World announced plans to add a new Thanksgiving-themed section for the park's 60th anniversary. A new wooden roller coaster called The Voyage was revealed as the main attraction for the area. The Gravity Group (a company formed from the remnants of Custom Coasters International) was contracted to build the new ride. Larry Bill, a co-founder, was heavily involved in the coaster's design. Then-park president Will Koch also gave input and is credited as one of the ride's designers. As with the development of another coaster at the park, The Legend, Koch sought input from roller coaster enthusiasts around the world during the construction of The Voyage. During construction, The Voyage was featured in episodes of "SuperCoasters" on the National Geographic channel and "Building the Biggest: Coasters" on the Discovery Channel.

The Voyage opened to the public on May 6, 2006. It originally operated with three 28-passenger trains manufactured by Philadelphia Toboggan Coasters (PTC). The twenty-eight seats of the ceremonial first ride were auctioned off on eBay, with proceeds donated to Riley Children's Foundation.

=== Train modifications ===
In November 2009, Holiday World announced that they would be replacing The Voyage's PTC trains with a new train model known as Timberliners. Timberliners were under development at the time by Gravitykraft, an affiliate company of The Gravity Group, and were intended to debut on The Voyage in 2010 as the first ride to run Timberliners. The park's goal was to improve the ride experience, which had become somewhat rougher over the years as the track aged. Anticipating the arrival of two Timberliners, Holiday World sold two of its three PTC trains from The Voyage to Six Flags Darien Lake, where they were put into use on The Predator (though the lead cars featuring the ride's logo were presumably not sold). However, The Voyage's new Timberliner trains arrived too late to be used during the 2010 season, so the park decided to move one of the trains from Raven over to The Voyage. The transition required modifications to the train, and the move left The Raven with only one train for the remainder of the season.

For the 2011 season, Holiday World continued with the same train configuration on The Voyage. The original Timberliner model that was tested at Holiday World instead debuted on Wooden Warrior at Quassy Amusement Park in Connecticut, and Twister at Gröna Lund in Sweden. Gravitykraft instead planned to debut a newer Timberliner model on The Voyage in 2012. Raven needed to return to normal rider capacity in the meantime, so Holiday World purchased an additional five PTC cars. With these two spares, they were able to construct a full seven-car train to be used on The Voyage and allow the return of the borrowed train back to Raven.

In 2012, a delivery delay of the new Timberliner model trains prevented the park from adequately testing them in the spring. Holiday World decided to postpone their implementation to the 2013 season. In addition to routine track maintenance, Holiday World worked with The Gravity Group in the 2011-12 off-season to rebuild and reprofile portions of the ride's "spaghetti bowl" turnaround near the midcourse brake run. As a result of the reprofiled turn, an additional 0.1 second of airtime was created, raising the ride's new airtime total to 24.3 seconds.

In August 2013, Holiday World officially cancelled the Timberliner project, thanking Gravitykraft for their efforts but stating that they were no longer pursuing the new trains for use on The Voyage. Instead, they would continue using the PTC trains. In 2014, Holiday World shortened The Voyage's two trains from seven cars to six. In 2015, the construction of Thunderbird resulted in the installation of netting under Thunderbird's vertical loop to protect Voyage riders passing below.

== Characteristics ==
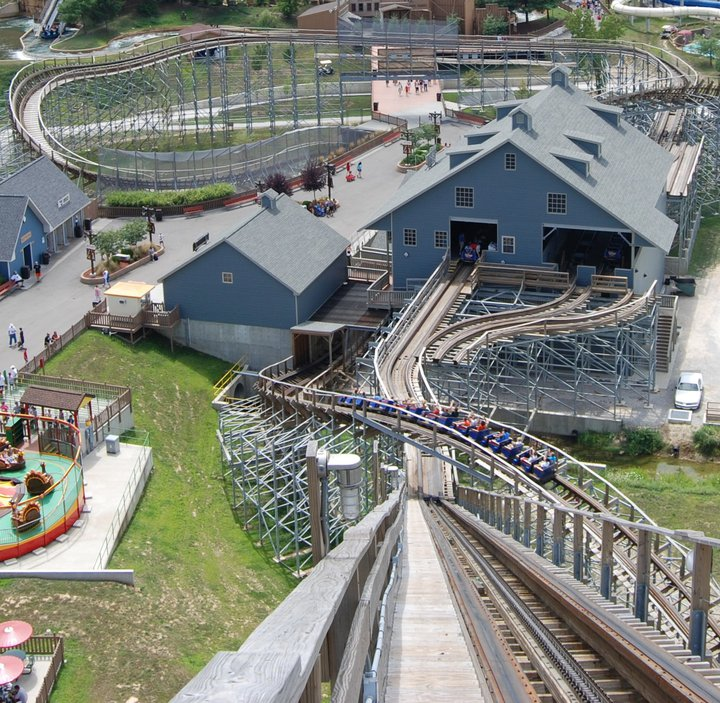
The Voyage's station, maintenance area, and transfer track (rightmost building), gift shop (building to the left of the station), and brake run (behind the station), as seen from the coaster's lift hill

=== Trains ===
The Voyage features two 24-passenger trains built by Philadelphia Toboggan Coasters. Each train is blue, with red and gold decals down the sides, and features the ride's logo on the front of the lead car. Each train is made up of six cars that hold four riders each. Each car has two rows capable of holding two riders each. Each row has a seat divider, two individual ratcheting lap bars, and two individual seat belts.

=== Track ===
The wooden track on The Voyage is made from eight layers of Southern yellow pine, with a single layer of running steel along, the top, sides, and underside of the track where the train's wheels make contact with it. The support structure is made of an estimated 750 short tons (680 t) of steel. The total length of the track is 6,442 feet (1,964 m) and includes 154 feet (47 m), 107 feet (33 m), and 100 feet (30 m) drops, in addition to five underground tunnels. The track features a chain lift hill and five block sections. The Voyage utilizes fin brakes.

== Ride experience ==
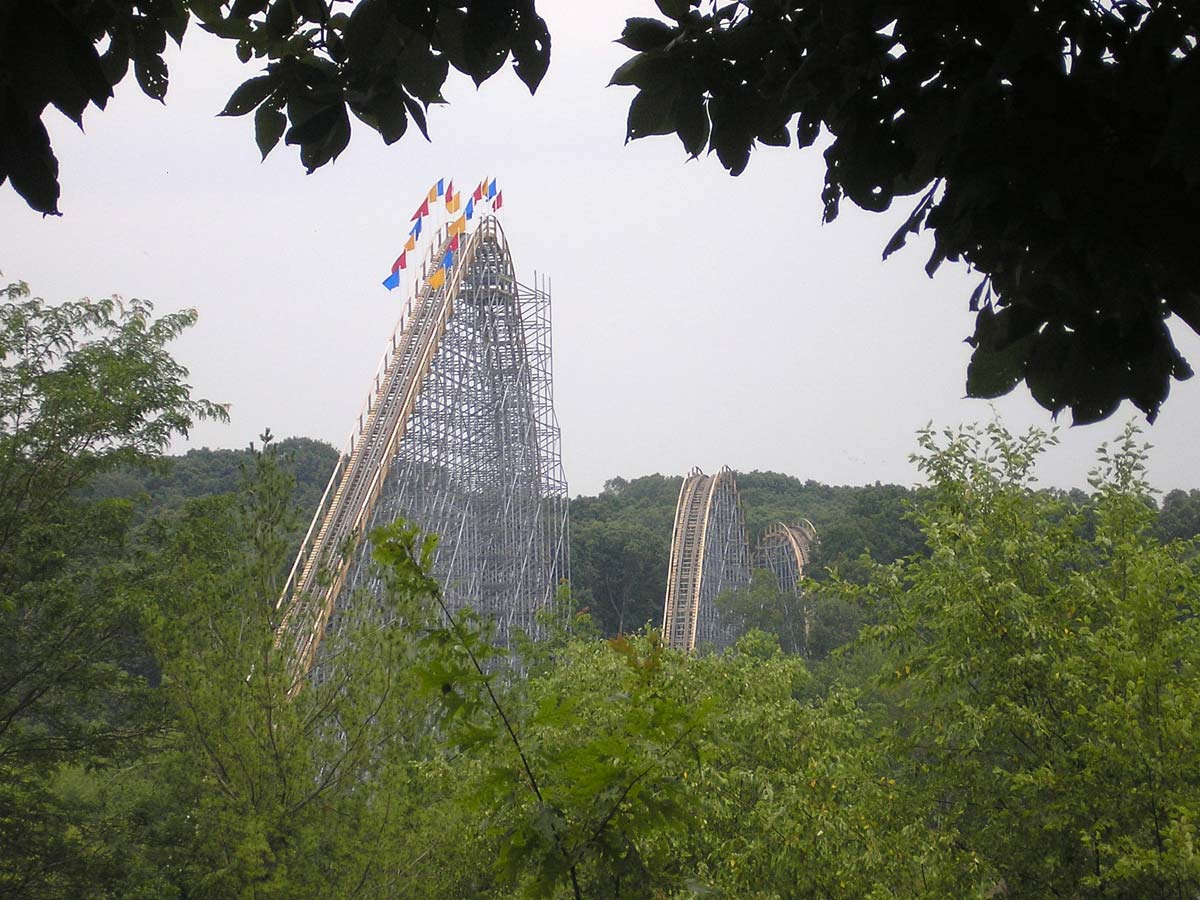
An overview of the first three drops of The Voyage in 2006, as it looked prior to the construction of Thunderbird

A full ride on The Voyage lasts approximately two minutes and forty-five seconds.

=== Station to midcourse brake run ===
Immediately upon dispatch from the station, the train passes the transfer track, and dips down while crossing under the drop into the station fly-under before latching onto the lift hill chain. At the top of the 163 feet (50 m) lift hill, the train immediately plunges down the ride's initial 154 feet (47 m) drop at 65 miles per hour (105 km/h). At the bottom of the drop, the train immediately traverses a 107 feet (33 m) airtime hill. At the bottom of the drop the train passes under Thunderbird's vertical loop, and then enters a 100 feet (30 m) airtime hill.

Immediately at the bottom of the third drop, the train enters the first of the five underground tunnels and the first of eight underground moments, during which the track travels under Thunderbird's heartline roll. After exiting the first tunnel, the train goes over a small hill before entering the second underground tunnel. After exiting the second tunnel, the train travels over yet another hill before diving into the ride's third underground tunnel. Upon exiting the third tunnel, the train enters the "spaghetti bowl" portion of the ride, beginning its return journey. The train first navigates a banked "S" curve to the left and the right, before making a full 180° turn to the left. The train then passes through a 90° banked turn to the left, followed immediately by a 90° banked turn to the right. Immediately after exiting this banked turn, the train makes a small turn to the left and drops into another underground tunnel. After exiting the tunnel, the train reaches the midcourse brake run.

=== Midcourse brake run to end ===
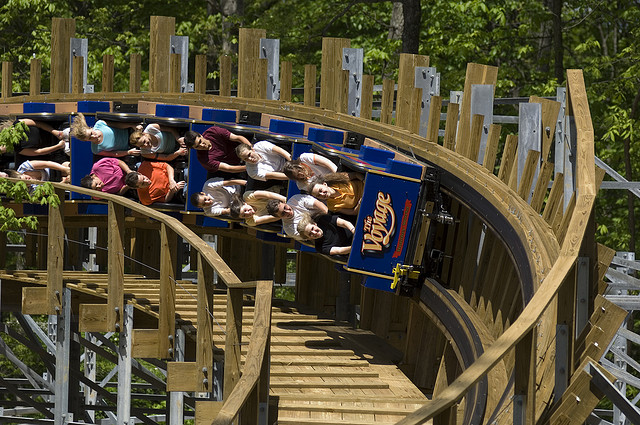
One of The Voyage's three 90° banked turns

The train's return trip begins with a triple-down drop into an underground tunnel, picking up considerable speed in the process. After exiting the tunnel, the train races toward the station while staying to the left of the track on the outbound hills. This portion passes through the support structure for the first three hills, creating multiple headchopper effects. After crossing back under Thunderbird's loop, the track goes through a series of S-bends under the second airtime hill and the lift hill that culminate in the final 90° banked to the right. Once the train exits the banked turn, it passes under the lift hill and takes a turn to the left. The ride's on-ride camera is located on the left side of the track near this turn.

After the train passes the on-ride camera, it flies over the base of the lift hill before making a diving right turn into a tunnel under the station. After exiting the tunnel, the train makes a climbing right turn before quickly shifting to a diving left turn that takes riders into another tunnel under the Thanksgiving midway. Then the train makes a climbing, sweeping turn to the right. Once the train exits the turn, it immediately enters the brake run, making a righthand turn as it does, before returning to the station.

== Records ==
World records held by The Voyage
Ranking	Statistic	Category
1st	24.3 seconds	Airtime (wooden roller coasters)
1st	5 tunnels	Number of underground tunnels (all roller coasters)
2nd	6,442 feet (1,964 m)	Length (wooden roller coasters)
5th	159 feet (48 m)	Height (wooden roller coasters)
6th	67.0 mph (107.8 km/h)	Speed (wooden roller coasters)
6th	154 feet (47 m)	Drop (wooden roller coasters)
7th	66°	Angle of descent (wooden roller coasters)
8th	6,442 feet (1,964 m)	Length (all roller coasters)

== Awards ==
In addition to other awards, The Voyage was voted the world's Best New Ride at the 2006 Golden Ticket Awards.

Golden Ticket Awards: Top wood Roller Coasters
Year									1998	1999
Ranking									–	–
Year	2000	2001	2002	2003	2004	2005	2006	2007	2008	2009
Ranking	–	–	–	–	–	–	2	1	1	1
Year	2010	2011	2012	2013	2014	2015	2016	2017	2018	2019
Ranking	1	1	2	4	3	4	4	4	3	2
Year	2020	2021	2022	2023	2024	2025	2026			
Ranking	N/A	2	2	2	2	2	1			

NAPHA Survey: Favorite Wood Roller Coaster
Year	2006	2007	2008	2009	2010	2011
Ranking	2	1	1	1	1	1

== Incident ==
On June 4, 2021, a 47-year-old woman was found unresponsive when the train she was riding in returned to the station. She was taken to a nearby hospital where she later died. An autopsy later determined that the woman tore her right internal thoracic artery, likely due to the force of the roller coaster, causing a rapid loss of blood. The ride remained closed for the rest of the evening out of respect for the woman and her family.

== In popular culture ==
The heavy metal band Fozzy rode The Voyage in the music video for their song "Sane", released on May 28, 2021.
