= Avalanche (Timber Falls Adventure Park) =

Defunct wooden roller coaster

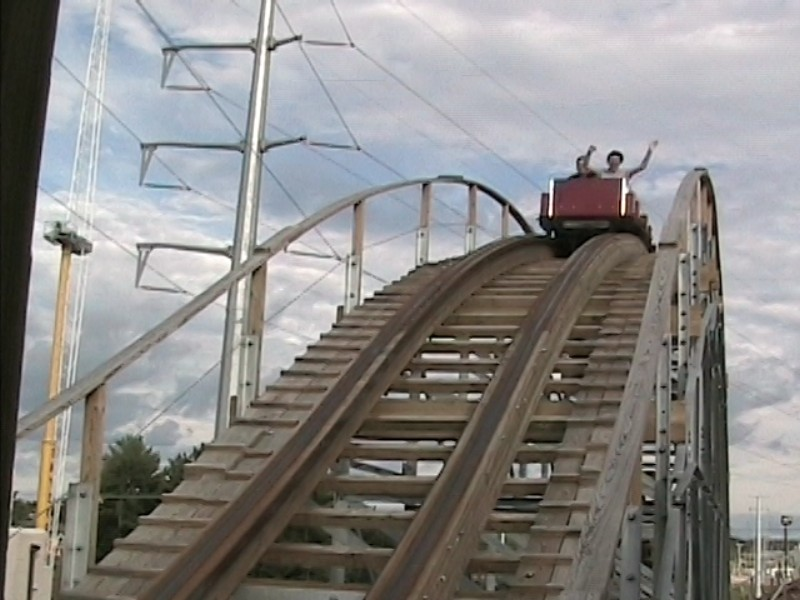
- A hill on Avalanche

Timber Falls Adventure Park
- Location: Timber Falls Adventure Park
- Coordinates: 43°37′41″N 89°46′59″W -->
- Status: Removed
- Opening date: July 2004
- Closing date: 2017

General statistics
- Type: Wood
- Manufacturer: S&S – Sansei Technologies
- Designer: Alan Schilke
- Lift/launch system: Chain lift hill
- Height: 88.5 ft (27.0 m)
- Length: 2,378 ft (725 m)
- Inversions: 0
- Max vertical angle: 61°
- Height restriction: 46 in (117 cm)
- Trains: Single train with 3 cars. Riders are arranged 2 across in 2 rows for a total of 12 riders per train.
- Avalanche at RCDB

Avalanche was a wooden roller coaster located at Timber Falls Adventure Park in Wisconsin Dells, Wisconsin, United States.

Upon opening, it was the tallest, fastest, and longest coaster in Wisconsin, as well as billed as having the steepest drop on a wooden roller coaster in North America.

Its layout featured twelve drops, providing riders with airtime, as well as turns banked up to an angle of 70 degrees.
