= Howler =

Howler may refer to:

- Howler (band), a band from Minneapolis, Minnesota
- The Howler, a 1982 song by British rock band King Crimson
- The Howler, a roller coaster at Holiday World in Santa Claus, Indiana
- The Howler (video game)
- Howler (mascot), the mascot of the Arizona Coyotes
- Howler (Animorphs), a fictional alien species from the Animorphs setting
- Howler (Harry Potter), a magical object in the Harry Potter setting
- HOWLER, a fictional infrastructure development company in JoJo's Bizarre Adventure's ninth part, The JOJOLands
- Howlers, a type of mathematical fallacy
- Howlers, creatures in Resistance: Fall of Man
- Howlers, creatures in Metro 2033

== See also ==
- Erbil or Hewlêr, a city in Iraq
- Howler monkey, a New World monkey
- Off-hook tone or howler tone
