= The Legend (roller coaster) =

Wooden roller coaster at Holiday World

- The Legend in July 2002

Holiday World & Splashin' Safari
- Location: Holiday World & Splashin' Safari
- Park section: Halloween
- Coordinates: 38.1202°N 86.9140°W
- Status: Operating
- Opening date: May 6, 2000
- Cost: US$3,000,000

General statistics
- Type: Wood
- Manufacturer: Custom Coasters International
- Designer: Dennis McNulty, Larry Bill
- Track layout: Terrain
- Lift/launch system: Chain Lift Hill
- Height: 99 ft (30 m)
- Drop: 113 ft (34 m)
- Length: 4,042 ft (1,232 m)
- Speed: 59 mph (95 km/h)
- Inversions: 0
- Duration: 2:00
- Capacity: 800 riders per hour
- Height restriction: 48 in (122 cm)
- Trains: 2 trains with 6 cars; riders arranged 2 across in 2 rows for a total of 24 riders per train
- Must transfer from wheelchair
- The Legend at RCDB

The Legend is a wooden roller coaster at Holiday World & Splashin' Safari in Santa Claus, Indiana. It was designed and built in 1999 by the now-defunct Custom Coasters International, with the help of Dennis McNulty and Larry Bill. It opened on May 6, 2000. The Legend is themed to Washington Irving's short story "The Legend of Sleepy Hollow", and mimics the frightful ride Ichabod Crane took as he was chased through the woods by the Headless Horseman. The Legend has been consistently ranked among the world's top fifty wooden roller coasters at the Golden Ticket Awards, which are presented annually by Amusement Today magazine.

== History ==
=== Development ===
Following the success of the park's first wooden coaster, Raven, park president Will Koch began making plans for a second wooden roller coaster. Koch contacted Custom Coasters International and began to form initial plans for the roller coaster. When the initial plans were completed, rather than immediately starting work on the new project, Koch took a different route. He posted the initial plans online and asked for input from roller coaster enthusiasts from around the world on design, theming, and name ideas. After receiving a multitude of emails, Koch determined that "The Legend of Sleepy Hollow" was the most popular theming suggestion. Construction began in April 1999 with the pouring of concrete footers. The final design and name, The Legend, was announced on June 15, 1999.

On December 11, 1999, Holiday World invited media outlets to take a construction tour of The Legend. The event included interviews with Will Koch and Denise Larrick.

The Legend opened on May 6, 2000, exactly five years after Raven. When the coaster opened, it operated with a single 24-passenger train built by Gerstlauer. Roller coaster enthusiasts traveled from across the country to ride the coaster upon its opening.

=== 2002 changes ===
In October 2001, Holiday World announced that The Legend would be undergoing several changes for the 2002 season. The original Gerstlauer train was replaced with two new trains manufactured by Philadelphia Toboggan Coasters. The additional train helped to improve capacity on The Legend from 550 riders per hour to 800 riders per hour.

Several modifications had to be made to the ride to allow for two-train operations. A transfer track was built on the straight section of track between the station and the dip into the lift hill, allowing for an unused train to be stored during normal operation and providing an additional area for maintenance crews to inspect the train. In addition, the station had to be extended to allow for two-train operation.

=== 2016 changes ===
During the 2015-2016 off-season, the exit and left turn out of the double helix was modified to incorporate a new double-down element, and a new themed tunnel was installed over the section where the track crosses under the Frightful Falls log flume ride.

== Characteristics ==
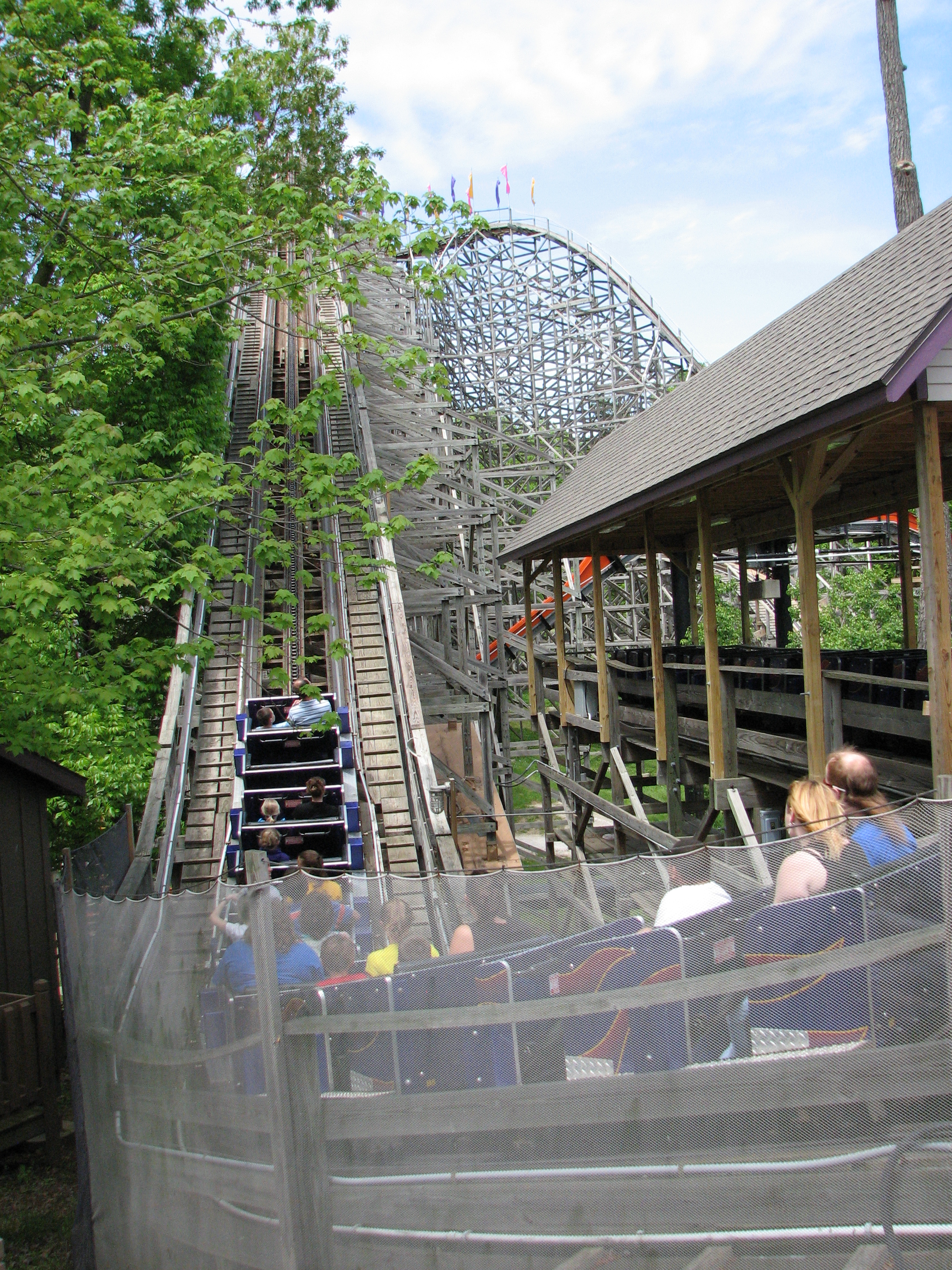
The Legend's lift hill and first drop

=== Trains ===
The Legend uses two 24-passenger trains built by Philadelphia Toboggan Coasters. The trains are purple, with red decals down the sides, and the ride's logo featured on the front of the lead car. Each train is made up of six cars that hold four riders each. Each car has two rows, each row holding two riders each. Each row has a seat divider, two individual ratcheting lap bars, and two individual seatbelts.

=== Track ===
The wooden track on The Legend is made from eight layers of Southern yellow pine, with a single layer of running steel along, the top, sides, and underside of the track where the train's wheels make contact with it. The support structure of the ride is also wooden. The total length of the track is 4,042 feet (1,232 m), and it includes 113 feet (34 m), 77 feet (23 m), and 64 feet (20 m) drops, in addition to four above-ground and underground tunnels. The track features a chain lift hill and three block sections. The Legend utilizes fin brakes.

== Ride experience ==
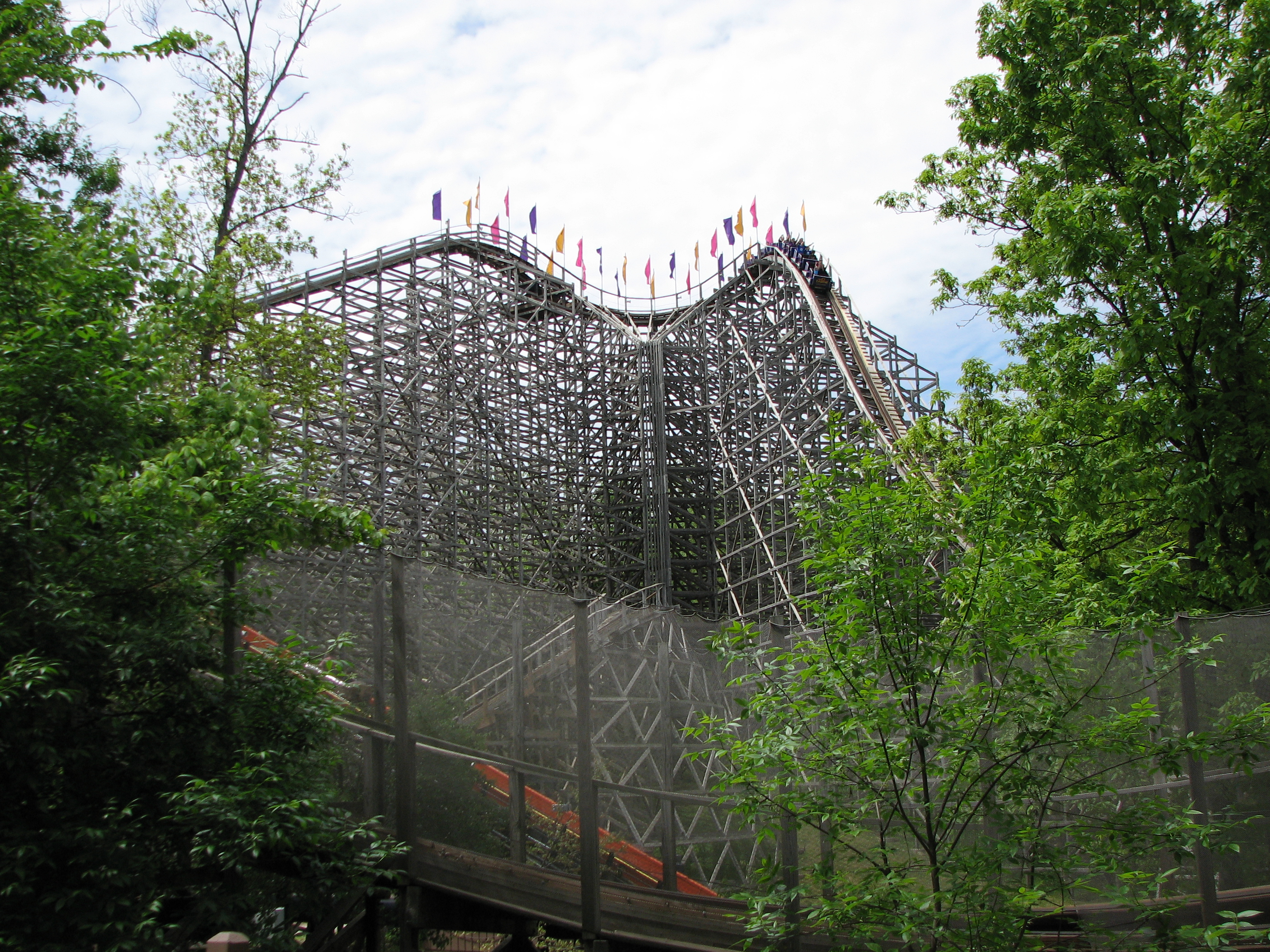
The Legend's first drop

A total ride experience on The Legend lasts approximately two minutes.

Upon dispatch, signaled by the ringing of the schoolbell attached to the station, the train dips down while taking a right turn before latching onto the lift hill chain. Once at the top of the lift hill, the train makes a small dip down and then back up as it makes a right hand turn. The recorded sound of a wolf howling can be heard before the train dives down a sweeping left-hand 113 feet (34 m) drop at 59 miles per hour (95 km/h) into a covered tunnel.

The track then rises to the left, uphill in preparation for the spiral drop. The train then descends into a 77 feet (23 m) spiral drop to the right before traversing an airtime hill. After heading uphill again, the train enters a 64 feet (20 m) drop through the second underground tunnel. After exiting the tunnel, the train makes a turn to the right, then to the left, before dipping down another drop and rising into the double helix. In the double helix, the train turns to the right, making two complete circles. At the conclusion of the double helix the train goes downhill, then makes a lefthand turn through the double-down drop and enters a 90° right turn, followed by a drop and a banked 90° turn to the left. The train then makes a 180° turn to the right. Once the train exits this element, it immediately enters the final brake run and returns to the station.

== Awards ==
Golden Ticket Awards: Top wood Roller Coasters
Year									1998	1999
Ranking									–	–
Year	2000	2001	2002	2003	2004	2005	2006	2007	2008	2009
Ranking	7	5	4	5	5	7	9	11	14	15
Year	2010	2011	2012	2013	2014	2015	2016	2017	2018	2019
Ranking	15	18	18	19	27	25	16	24	23	26
Year	2020	2021	2022	2023	2024	2025	2026			
Ranking	N/A	24	22	21	18	14	14			
