= Holiday World & Splashin' Safari =

Amusement park in Indiana

- Previously known as Santa Claus Land (1946-1984)
- Interactive map of Holiday World & Splashin' Safari
- Location: Santa Claus, Indiana, U.S.
- Coordinates: 38.119°N 86.916°W
- Status: Operating
- Opened: August 3, 1946
- Owner: Koch Development Corporation
- Operated by: Koch Development Corporation
- General manager: Matthew Eckert
- Theme: Holidays
- Slogan: "Number 1 for family fun!"
- Operating season: May through October
- Attendance: 1.1 million (2010)
- Area: 125 acres (0.51 km^{2})

Attractions
- Total: 49
- Roller coasters: 6
- Water rides: 12
- Website: Official website

Holiday World & Splashin' Safari, originally known as Santa Claus Land, is a theme park and water park located in Santa Claus, Indiana, United States. The park opened in 1946 and features rides, live entertainment, and games. It is divided into four sections that celebrate Christmas, Halloween, Thanksgiving, and the Fourth of July. Holiday World features three wooden roller coasters, most notably The Voyage, which has consistently ranked in Amusement Today's Golden Ticket Awards as one of the best in the world. The park is also home to three steel coasters.

The water park, Splashin' Safari, opened in 1993 and features two of the longest water coasters in the world, Wildebeest and Mammoth, the latter of which holds a Guinness World Record. The water park also contains raft rides, water slides, and other family-friendly water attractions.

== History ==
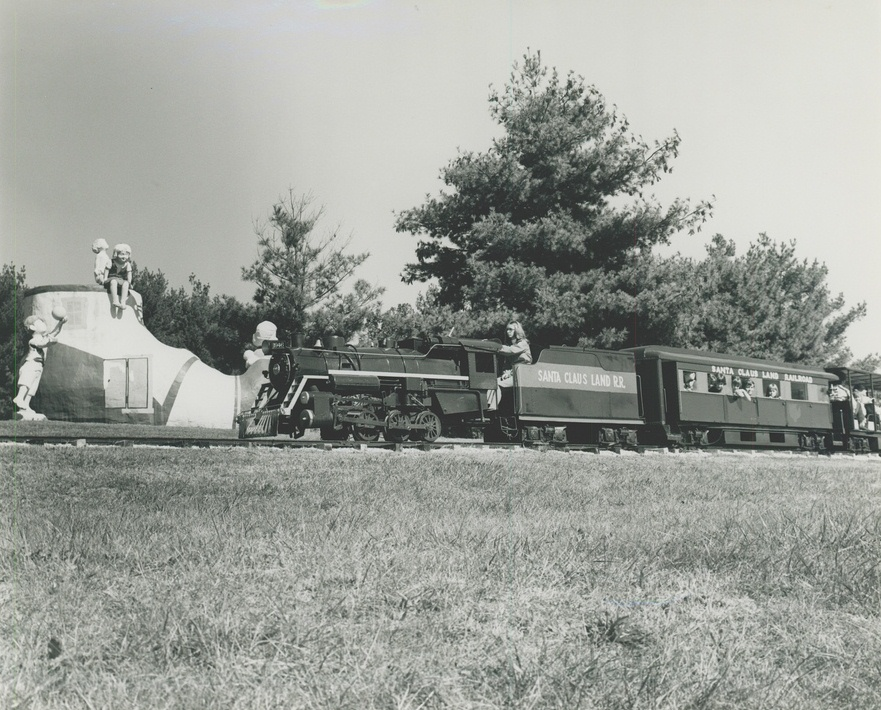
The Freedom Train, previously called the Santa Claus Land Railroad, operated from 1946 to 2012

=== Santa Claus Land ===
==== Construction ====
Plans for Santa Claus Land were first conceived as a retirement project by Louis J. Koch, a former industrialist from Evansville, Indiana. In 1941, Koch visited the town of Santa Claus, Indiana. Upset that children came to a town named Santa Claus only to be dismayed when Santa Claus wasn't there, Koch developed the idea for a park where children could have fun and visit Santa year-round. Although initial construction plans were delayed by World War II, construction of Santa Claus Land eventually began on August 4, 1945. At the time, Indiana had only one other amusement park, Indiana Beach (then called Ideal Beach).

==== Opening to 1954 ====
Santa Claus Land opened on August 3, 1946. At no cost, the park offered a Santa Claus actor, a toy shop, toy displays, a restaurant and themed children's rides, one of which was the Freedom Train (which originally opened as the Santa Claus Land Railroad). With the park's success, Louis Koch's son, Bill Koch, took over as head of Santa Claus Land. In the following years, Bill Koch continued to add to the park, including the first Jeep-Go-Round ever manufactured, a new restaurant, and a deer farm which was eventually home to fourteen European white fallow deer.

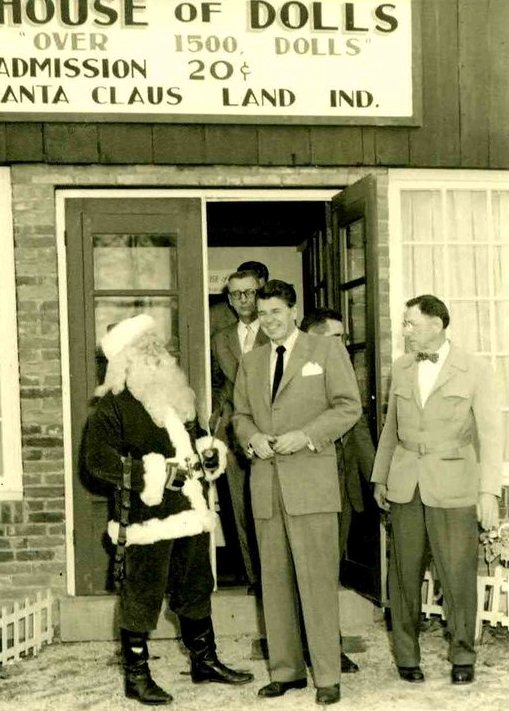
Ronald Reagan visiting Santa Claus Land in 1955

==== 1955 to 1975 ====
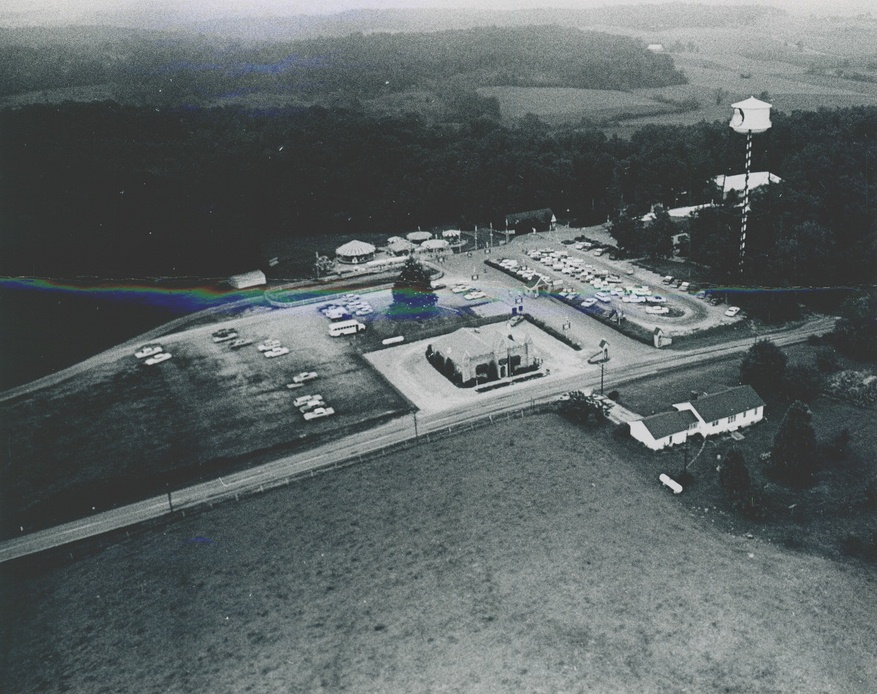
An aerial view of Santa Claus Land taken around 1957

Santa Claus Land charged admission for the first time in 1955; adults were charged 50 cents while children continued to be admitted for free. Despite the new cost of admission, attendance continued to grow with the park. The Pleasureland ride section, which exists today as Rudolph's Reindeer Ranch, debuted in 1955. In the early 1970s, additional children's rides, including Dasher's Seahorses, Comet's Rockets, Blitzen's Airplanes, and Prancer's Merry-Go-Round, were added to this section. From 1959 to 1961, the first live entertainment, the Willie Bartley Water Ski Thrill Show, performed on Lake Rudolph each summer. A choir composed of local children also performed at the park in 1970 and 1971.

In 1960, Bill Koch married Patricia "Pat" Yellig, the daughter of Jim Yellig, the park's Santa Claus actor. Bill and Pat Koch would have five children: Will, Kristi, Daniel, Philip, and Natalie.

==== 1976 to 1983 ====
In 1976, Santa Claus Land moved its entrance from State Road 162 to its present location on State Road 245. The park began to focus on appealing to families as a whole, rather than just children. The park had added nine new rides by 1984, eight of which they hoped would appeal to older children and adults alike.

=== Holiday World ===
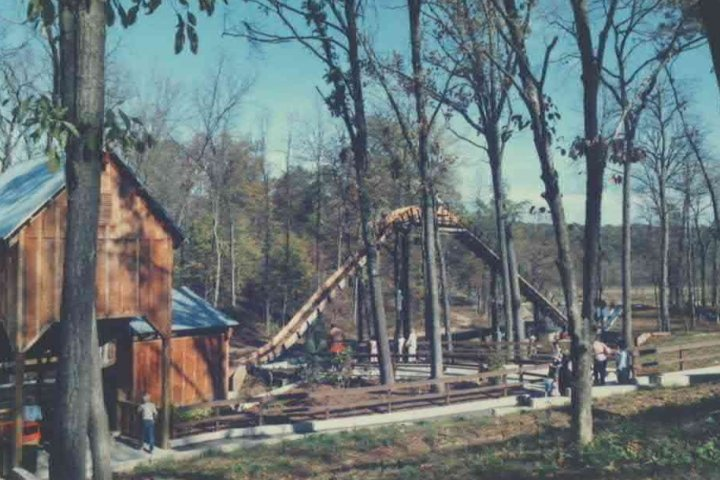
An early photo of Frightful Falls prior to the construction of The Legend in this area

==== 1984 to 1992 ====
By 1984, the Koch Family had realized the theming possibilities beyond Christmas. Santa Claus Land soon saw the first major expansion in park history with the addition of a Halloween section and a Fourth of July section. With the inclusion of more than just Christmas, Santa Claus Land formally changed its name to Holiday World. The Frightful Falls log flume and the Banshee Falling Star ride were added to the Halloween section in 1984 and 1986 respectively, the Raging Rapids river rapids ride was added to the Fourth of July section in 1990, and the Kringle's Kafé restaurant was built in the Christmas section.

It was also during this time period that Holiday World saw a change in leadership. Will Koch, the eldest of Bill Koch's children, took over as president of the park. Another of Bill Koch's children, Daniel "Dan" Koch, became chairman of the board.

=== Holiday World & Splashin' Safari ===
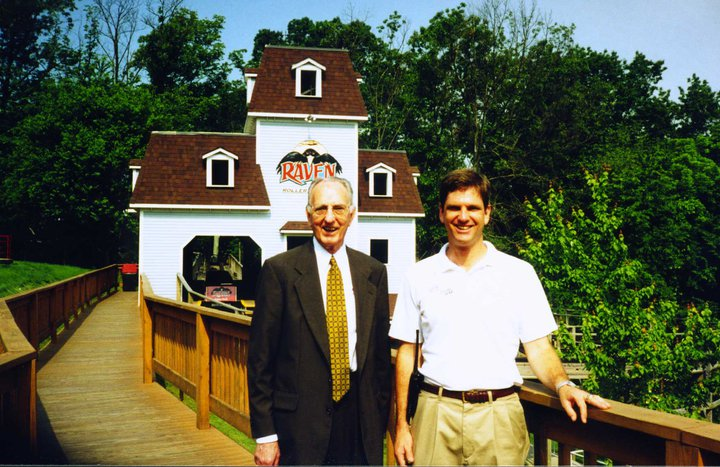
An early photo of Raven. Bill Koch Sr. is on the left, and Will Koch is on the right

==== 1993 to 2005 ====
In 1993, the water park Splashin' Safari opened. In its first year of operation, Splashin' Safari operated with the Congo River lazy river, the Crocodile Isle children's play area, and the AmaZOOM and Bamboo Chute water slides. A wave pool called The Wave was added the following year.

The park added the first of its three wooden roller coasters in 1995 with Raven, built by Custom Coasters International. The Raven was named "Ride of the Year" and voted the world's second best wooden roller coaster in its opening year. In 2000, The Raven was ranked as the best wooden roller coaster in the world by Amusement Today magazine, a distinction it held for 4 years. As of the 2025 awards, Raven has remained ranked among the top fifty wooden roller coasters in the world.

Over the next four years, the park made only two additions. The first was the addition of the Monsoon Lagoon children's play complex in Splashin' Safari. The second was the replacement of the Firecracker roller coaster with Holidog's FunTown, a children's play area featuring Holidog's Treehouse, The Howler, Doggone Trail and Magic Waters, themed to one of the park's mascots, Holidog.

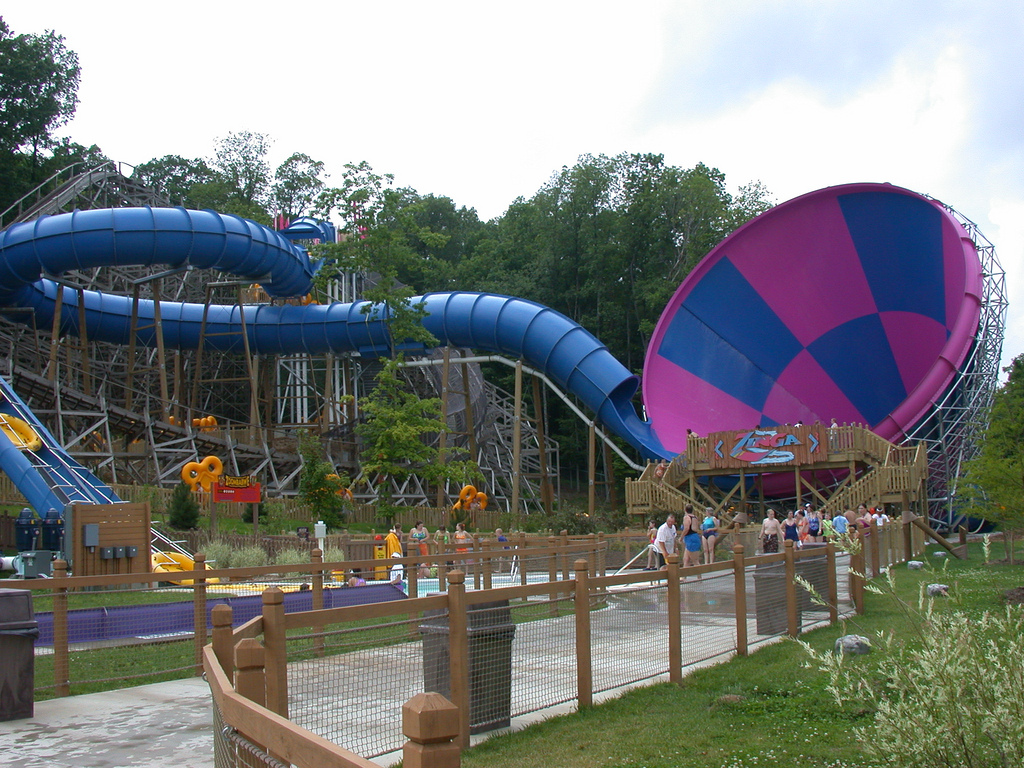
Zinga water slide

Custom Coasters International was hired to install another wooden roller coaster. The Legend, based on Washington Irving's "The Legend of Sleepy Hollow", opened in 2000 adjacent to Raven. The Legend's ranking reached its peak in 2002, when it was voted the fourth best wooden roller coaster in the world. Much like Raven, The Legend continues to be ranked among the top fifty wooden roller coasters in the world. In 2000, the park also began offering its guests free unlimited soft drinks, a service which brought attention to the park.

For the next five years, the park's additions grew steadily. In 2002, ZOOMbabwe, the world's longest enclosed water slide, was added to Splashin' Safari. In 2003, Splashin' Safari added Zinga, a ProSlide Technology Tornado slide, while Holiday World replaced Banshee with the HallowSwings Wave swinger ride, and the Hall of Famous Americans wax museum with the Liberty Launch Double Shot ride. In 2004, the park continued to expand the water park, adding the Jungle Racer racing slide and the Jungle Jets children's play area. Bahari Wave Pool was added in 2005, which marked the beginning of an expansion project that would double the size of Splashin' Safari.

In 2004, the park earned the Applause Award from the International Association of Amusement Parks and Attractions (IAAPA). To win the award (which is awarded every two years), a park must "show foresight, originality and creativity, plus sound business development and profitability". With an attendance of 883,000 visitors that year, Holiday World was the lowest-visited park to ever receive the award.

==== 2006 to 2013 ====
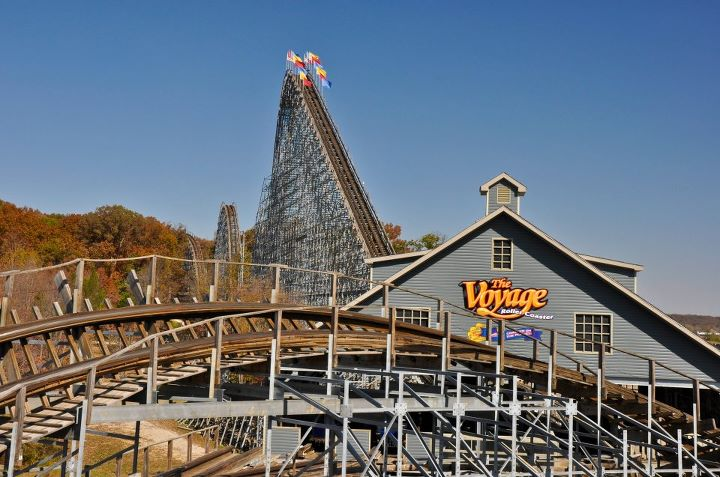
The Voyage opened in 2006 and holds the record for the most airtime on a wooden roller coaster

The 2006 season marked the 60th anniversary of Holiday World. The park celebrated it by adding a new section themed to Thanksgiving. In order to create the section, the park added two new rides. The first was Gobbler Getaway, a Sally Corporation interactive dark ride. The second and anchor attraction was the park's third wooden roller coaster, The Voyage, built by The Gravity Group. The addition of The Voyage garnered national attention, as the roller coaster claimed the record for most airtime of any wooden roller coaster at 24.3 seconds. It is also the second longest wooden roller coaster in the world, behind only The Beast at Kings Island. In its first year of operation, The Voyage was awarded the title of Best New Ride and second best wooden roller coaster in the world by Amusement Today. From 2007 to 2011, The Voyage was awarded the title of best wooden roller coaster in the world. It has remained in the top five best wooden coasters in these rankings every year since its opening. Also added in 2006 was the Bahari River lazy river in Splashin' Safari. It was named Best New Waterpark Ride by Amusement Today.

Over the next three years, Holiday World & Splashin' Safari opened several new additions. The Bakuli slide and Kima Bay play area were added to Splashin' Safari, the Turkey Whirl Tilt-A-Whirl ride and the Plymouth Rock Café were added to the Thanksgiving section, the Star Spangled Carousel replaced Thunder Bumpers on Chesapeake Bay in the Fourth of July section, and the Reindeer Games drop tower replaced Kids Castle in the Christmas section. In 2009, Holiday World continued to break records by opening the world's tallest water ride, Pilgrims Plunge, in the Thanksgiving section of the park. Pilgrims Plunge deviated from the standard of using a sloped lift hill, instead opting for an open-air elevator system that took riders to a height of 135 feet (41 m) before dropping them at a 45-degree angle. Pilgrims Plunge was renamed to Giraffica in 2013 when the boundaries between the Thanksgiving section and the water park were slightly altered.

Splashin' Safari broke another record in 2010, when the Wildebeest water coaster was introduced. When Wildebeest opened, it was the world's longest water coaster at 1,710 feet (520 m) long. It was also among the first water coasters to use linear induction motors, rather than water jets or conveyor belts, to propel riders up hills. Wildebeest was named Best New Waterpark Ride in 2010, as well as Best Waterpark Ride in 2010, 2011 and 2012. The park broke its own record just two years later, in 2012, when Mammoth opened. Mammoth, which was the most expensive ride added to the park until the addition of Thunderbird, is 1,763 feet (537 m) long, making it the longest water coaster in the world.

The park suffered a sudden loss in June 2010 when president and CEO Will Koch died while swimming at his home. Although the Spencer County coroner listed the official cause of death as drowning, family and park officials believe Koch's type 1 diabetes played a factor in his death. Soon after his death, Holiday World & Splashin' Safari named Will's younger brother Dan as the park's new president. Dan Koch served as the park's president until late 2012, shortly after which the board of directors announced Matt Eckert as the new president, sparking a fight within the family for control of the park and its assets. Matt Eckert was previously one of the park's two general managers and was not related to the Koch family.

Will Koch's widow Lori and their three children won primary ownership of the park and its parent company, Koch Development Corporation, after a court battle. Dan Koch, along with his sister Natalie, would go on in 2014 to form Koch Family Parks and buy Alabama Adventure & Splash Adventure, a previously troubled theme park in Bessemer, Alabama.

In recent years, the park has replaced some of its older rides with newer rides. In Holiday World, Blitzen's Airplanes was replaced with Rudolph's Round-Up in 2011, and in 2012 Paul Revere's Midnight Ride was replaced with Sparkler, a 65 feet (20 m) tall Zamperla Vertical Swing ride. Due to limited vertical clearance for Sparkler, the park decided to relocate Star Spangled Carousel to the former location of Paul Revere's Midnight Ride and to place Sparkler in the carousel's place. The following year, Holiday World removed part of Holidog's Treehouse to make room for a new tea cup ride called Kitty's Tea Party. In 2013, the park also removed the only original remaining ride, the Freedom Train, citing maintenance concerns. It was replaced by another train ride which the park named Holidog Express. In Splashin' Safari, Jungle Jets was replaced with Safari Sam's SplashLand in 2011. In 2013, AmaZOOM, Bamboo Chute, Congo River, and Crocodile Isle were removed to make way for a new Splashin' Safari entry plaza. The Hyena Falls slide complex and the Hyena Springs play area were added to the north of Giraffica.

==== 2014 and 2015 expansions ====
On September 6, 2013, Holiday World announced plans for a 2014 expansion totaling $8 million. The highlight of the announcement was a new swinging ship ride called Mayflower, which is located in the park's Thanksgiving section just to the north of Gobbler Getaway. This ride is the first of a series of rides intended to bring the focus back on the theme park after several years of major additions to the water park. In addition to Mayflower, the park introduced a new restaurant and shop in Splashin' Safari, more cabanas, additional benches and shade structures, parking lot improvements, and the addition of fireworks on Friday nights between June 13 and August 1.

Giraffica closed at the end of the 2013 season and was removed before the start of the 2014 season, citing technical problems.

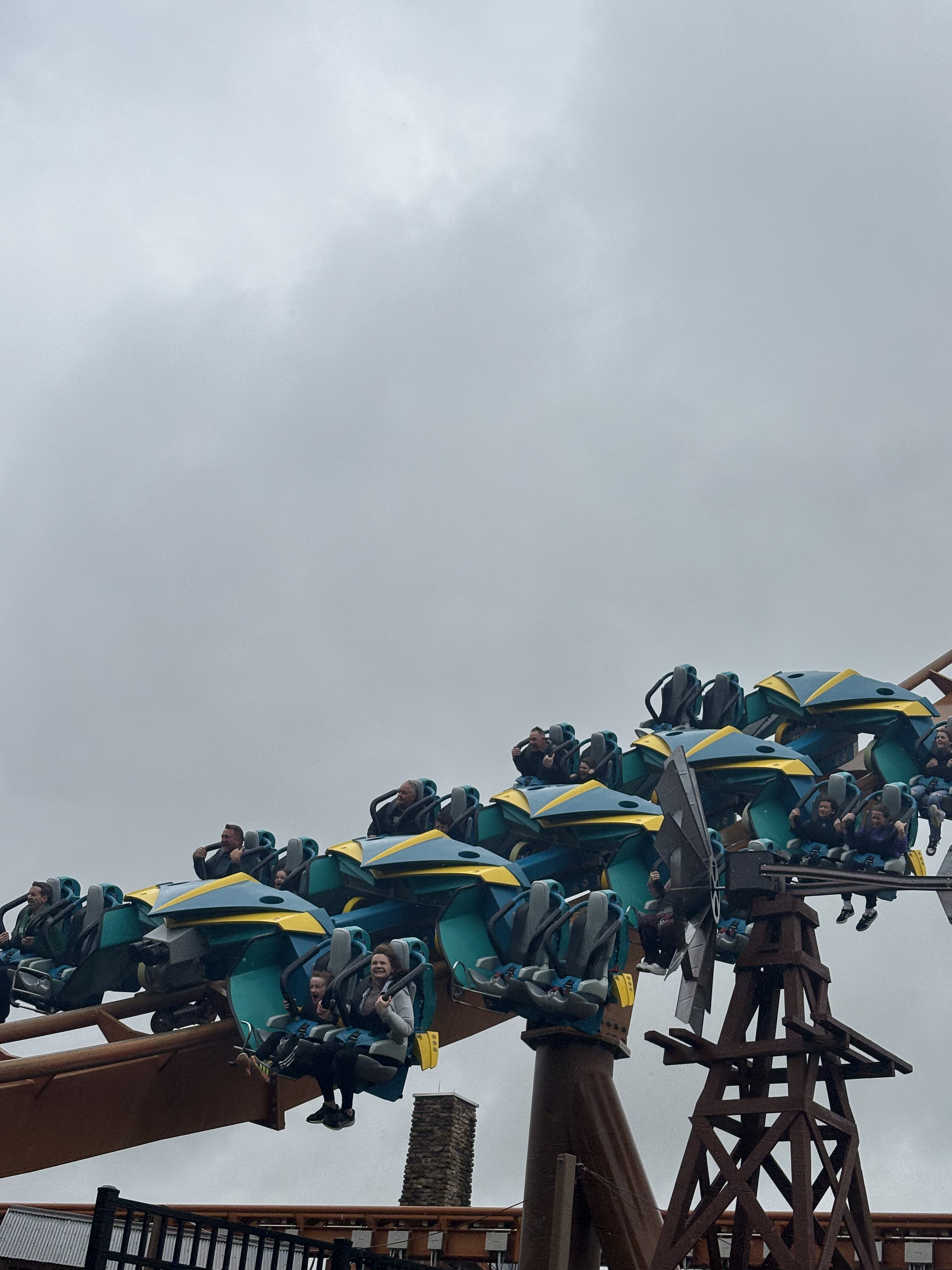
Thunderbird after its first inversion

On July 24, 2014, the park announced the construction of Thunderbird, a launched Bolliger & Mabillard Wing Coaster (the first of its kind in the United States, and the only one until 2025), for the 2015 season, occupying the area north of Hyena Falls and intertwining with The Voyage. The coaster reaches launches at 62 mph (100 km) in 3.5 seconds, and features the tallest vertical loop on a Wing Coaster. It was also the park's first major steel roller coaster.

==== 2020 expansion ====
On August 6, 2019, Holiday World formally announced the 2020 addition of Cheetah Chase, a dueling launched ProSlide Technology water coaster, for Splashin' Safari. Cheetah Chase features a track with a length of over 1,700 feet and a maximum speed of over 20 miles per hour. It is the world's first launched water coaster and Splashin' Safari's third major water coaster. The expansion also brought new rentable shaded lounge chairs near the area.

==== 2024 expansion ====
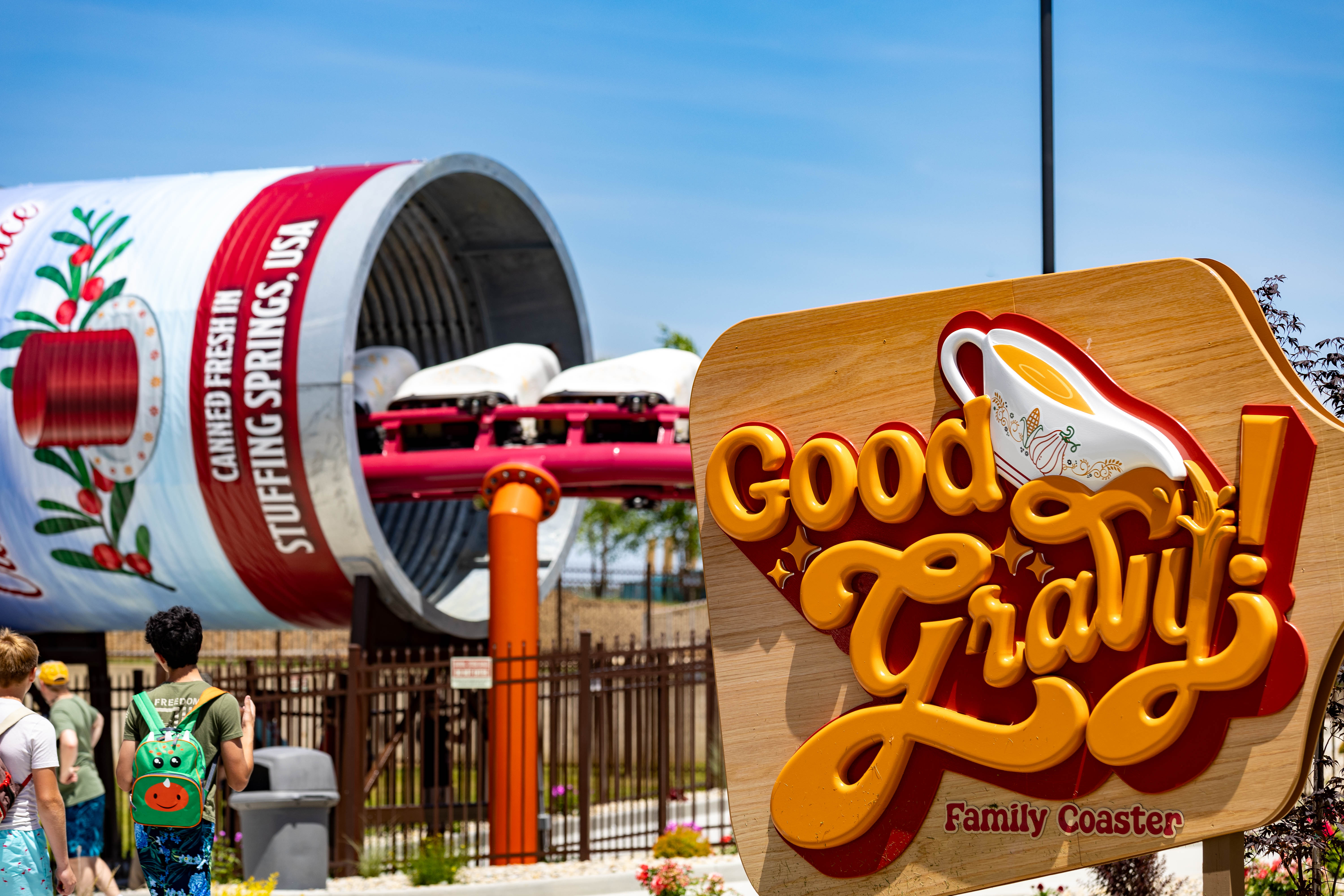
Good Gravy! sign and cranberry sauce can tunnel

On August 1, 2023, the park announced plans for a new area within the Thanksgiving section called Stuffing Springs, on land where Girrafica was formerly located. The area is headlined by Good Gravy!, a Vekoma Family Boomerang coaster. It was the first Family Boomerang to be built in North America. The ride stands at 77 feet tall and reaches a maximum speed of 37 mph. The area also includes a playground, a Dippin' Dots stand, and additional restrooms.

==== 2026 expansion ====
On July 1, 2026, the park announced the installation of Cannonball!, a Mack Rides water coaster for 2027. The ride will be the tallest and fastest water coaster in the United States.

== Themed areas ==
Holiday World is divided into four holiday-themed sections: Christmas, Halloween, Fourth of July and Thanksgiving. Each of the sections features rides, games, food, and other attractions that follow the theme of the section's respective holiday. Splashin' Safari takes the general theme of an African safari.

=== Christmas ===
Upon entering Holiday World, guests immediately enter the Christmas section. The Christmas section is the oldest and original section of Holiday World, dating back to the park's opening in 1946. It was the only section of the park until 1984. Although devoid of any major rides, there is a small sub-section called Rudolph's Reindeer Ranch, which is home to several small children's rides. Since the park's opening in 1946, a Santa Claus actor has been available daily to interact with children.

Name	Year installed	Manufacturer	Description
Comet's Rockets	1970s	Allan Herschell Company	Children's rocket ride
Dancer's Fish	1970s	Sellner Manufacturing	Bulgy the Whale
Dasher's Seahorses	1970s	Nalin Manufacturing	Children's seahorse ride
Prancer's Merry-Go-Round	1970s	Nalin Manufacturing	Children's carousel
Reindeer Games	2008	Moser's Rides	Three-story family drop ride

=== Halloween ===
The Halloween section was one of two new themed sections added in 1984.

Name	Year installed	Manufacturer	Description
Frightful Falls	1984	Hopkins Rides	Log flume
HallowSwings	2003	Zamperla	Wave swinger
Raven	1995	Custom Coasters International	Wooden roller coaster themed to Edgar Allan Poe's poem "The Raven"
Scarecrow Scrambler	1976	Eli Bridge Company	Scrambler
The Legend	2000	Custom Coasters International	Wooden roller coaster themed to Washington Irving's short story "The Legend of Sleepy Hollow"

=== Fourth of July ===
The Fourth of July section was the second of two sections added in 1984.

Name	Year installed	Manufacturer	Description
Cannonball!	Opening 2027	Mack Rides	90 foot tall water coaster with top speeds of 45 miles per hour
Eagles Flight	1976	Bisch Rocco	Flying Scooters
Firecracker	2017	Robels Bouso Atracciones	Restored Calypso ride. Named after a roller coaster that formerly operated at the park.
Holidog Express	2013	Chance Rides	Miniature train
Lewis & Clark Trail	1978	Gould Manufacturing	Tin Lizzie antique car ride
Liberty Launch	2003	S&S	Seven-story Double Shot. Relocated from a park in Panama City, Florida.
Revolution	2005	Dartron	Round Up ride
Rough Riders	1976	Soli	Bumper cars themed to former President Theodore Roosevelt's Rough Riders
Star Spangled Carousel	2008	Chance Rides	Carousel
Tippecanoes	1988	Venture Rides	Children's canoe ride. Originally called Indian River Canoes, but renamed to Tippecanoes in 2016.

==== Holidog's FunTown ====
Name	Year installed	Manufacturer	Description
Doggone Trail	1999	Zamperla	Children's jeep ride
Holidog's Treehouse	1999	N/A	Three-story play structure. The original was replaced with a new wheelchair-accessible play structure in 2017.
Just for Pups	1999	N/A	Smaller version of Holidog's Treehouse intended for young children
Kitty's Tea Party	2013	Zamperla	Tea cup ride
Magic Waters	1999	N/A	Splash pad
The Howler	1999	Zamperla	Steel kiddie coaster

=== Thanksgiving ===
The Thanksgiving section is the newest section of the park, added in 2006 to commemorate Holiday World's 60th anniversary.

Name	Year installed	Manufacturer	Description
Crow's Nest	2012 (moved to section in 2015)	Zamperla	A 65-foot (20 meter) tall vertical swing ride. Originally known as Sparkler when it opened in the Fourth of July section, but later renamed to Crow's Nest when it was relocated within the park in 2015.
Gobbler Getaway	2006	Sally Corporation	Interactive dark ride
Mayflower	2014	Chance Rides	Swinging ship themed to the Mayflower
The Voyage	2006	The Gravity Group	Wooden roller coaster themed to the voyage the Pilgrims made to the United States in 1620
Thunderbird	2015	Bolliger & Mabillard	Launched Wing Coaster
Turkey Whirl	2007	Larson International	Tilt-A-Whirl

==== Stuffing Springs ====
Name	Year installed	Manufacturer	Description
Cranberry Corner	2024	Miracle Recreation Equipment Company	A toddler's play structure that features slides, climbing structures, and interactive elements
Good Gravy!	2024	Vekoma	Steel Family Boomerang coaster themed to Thanksgiving dinner at "Grandma Gracy's" house

=== Splashin' Safari ===
Splashin' Safari, added in 1993, has consistently ranked among the best water parks in the United States, even being named the best water park in the country by TripAdvisor in 2011. The water park takes the general theme of a safari, with ride names featuring various animals, rivers and Swahili words. Unlike a number of other theme parks that necessitate a separate admission fee for the water park, entry to Splashin' Safari is included with admission to Holiday World.

Name	Year installed	Manufacturer	Description
Bahari River	2006	N/A	Lazy river
Bahari Wave Pool	2005	N/A	Wave pool featuring geysers and water jets
Bakuli	2007	ProSlide Technology	Behemoth Bowl slide
Cheetah Chase	2020	ProSlide Technology	Launched dueling water coaster
Jungle Racer	2004	ProSlide Technology	Five-story ProRacer with ten lanes
Kima Bay	2008	N/A	Play area faturing seven body slides, 125 water jets, and a tipping bucket containing 1,200 US gallons (4,500 L) of water
Mammoth	2012	ProSlide Technology	1,763 feet (537 m) long HydroMagnetic Mammoth water coaster. Longest water coaster in the world.
Otorongo	1997	ProSlide Technology	Collection of three intertwining enclosed inline tube slides named "Otto", "Ron", and "Go"
Safari Sam's SplashLand	2011	ProSlide Technology	Children's play area featuring an activity pool with interactive water elements and eight open and enclosed body slides
Tembo Falls	2018	ProSlide Technology	Set of eight smaller water slides designed for small children
Tembo Tides	2018	N/A	Small wave pool designed for small children
The Wave	1994	N/A	Wave pool
Watubee	1996	ProSlide Technology	Family river rapids ride
Wildebeest	2010	ProSlide Technology	1,710 feet (520 m) long HydroMagnetic Rocket water coaster
Zinga	2003	ProSlide Technology	Eight-story Tornado slide
ZOOMbabwe	2002	ProSlide Technology	Enclosed family river rapids ride

== Defunct rides and attractions ==
Ride	Added	Removed	Location	Description
Children's Roller Coaster	Unknown	Unknown	Christmas	Steel kiddie roller coaster built by Allan Herschell Company
Jeep-Go-Round	1947	Unknown	Christmas	Children's jeep ride. First of its kind ever manufactured.
Bungee Jump	1992	1992	Halloween	Crane-based bungee jump show. Temporarily replaced the high dive show.
Stormin' Norman's Tank Tag	1992	1996	Fourth of July	Rideable miniature tanks. Replaced by The Alamo.
Firecracker	1981	1997	Fourth of July	Pinfari Zyklon Z47 steel roller coaster. Replaced by Holidog's FunTown.
Frontier Farm	1948	1999	Fourth of July	Petting zoo with a collection of animals, including baby goats, lambs and 14 reindeer named after Santa Claus's reindeer.
Banshee	1986	2002	Halloween	Chance Rides Falling Star. Replaced by HallowSwings.
Hall of Famous Americans	1950s	2002	Fourth of July	Wax museum with an emphasis on American Presidents and American history. Replaced by Liberty Launch.
Roundhouse	1976	2004	Fourth of July	Round Up. Replaced by Revolution, a larger version of the same ride.
Virginia Reel	1976	2005	Fourth of July	Tilt-A-Whirl. Removed to make room for an additional path to the Thanksgiving section. Replaced by Turkey Whirl, a new version of the same ride.
Kids' Castle	1992	2007	Christmas	Children's soft play structure, featuring a slide, trampoline and ball pit. Replaced by Reindeer Games
Deer Playground	1992	2007	Christmas	Small children's soft play structure, including a crawl-through train and small ball pit for younger children. Replaced by Reindeer Games.
Thunder Bumpers on Chesapeake Bay	1980	2007	Fourth of July	Bumper boats. Replaced by Firecracker and 3 Point Challenge.
Jungle Jets	2004	2010	Splashin' Safari	Splash pad with numerous water features. Replaced by Safari Sam's SplashLand.
Blitzen's Airplanes	1970s	2010	Christmas	Children's airplane ride. Replaced by Rudolph's Round-Up.
Paul Revere's Midnight Ride	1978	2011	Fourth of July	Eyerly Aircraft Company Spider. Star Spangled Carousel is now located in Paul Revere's Midnight Ride's former location.
Betsy Ross Doll House	1946	2011	Fourth of July	Walk-through attraction featuring a collection of antique dolls. Originally built in 1856 as the town of Santa Claus' first post office, it was converted into a doll house attraction when Santa Claus Land opened in 1946. The building was later moved off-site to be a part of a local museum.
AmaZOOM	1993	2012	Splashin' Safari	Enclosed inline tube slide. Removed to make room for a new Splashin' Safari entry plaza.
Bamboo Chute	1993	2012	Splashin' Safari	Inline tube slide with both open and enclosed sections. Removed to make room for a new Splashin' Safari entry plaza.
Congo River	1993	2012	Splashin' Safari	Lazy river. Removed to make room for a new Splashin' Safari entry plaza.
Crocodile Isle	1993	2012	Splashin' Safari	Children's play area featuring two pools connected by two body slides. Removed to make room for a new Splashin' Safari entry plaza.
Freedom Train	1946	2012	Fourth of July	Miniature train whose engine was a 1/4 scale model of a Baltimore and Ohio Railroad locomotive. Removed due to deterioration and replaced by Holidog Express. The engine is still preserved on display in the park.
Giraffica	2009	2013	Splashin' Safari	Intamin shoot the chute ride featuring a 135 feet (41 m) tall open-air elevator lift. Originally called Pilgrims Plunge from 2009 to 2012. Removed after the 2013 season due to downtime and unreliability.
Dancer's Thunder Bumpers Junior	1982	2013	Christmas	Children's bumper boats. Replaced by Salmon Run, which was originally in Fourth of July.
Stars & Stripes Showdown	2015	2015	Fourth of July	Skyline Attractions Strike-U-Up ride.
Monsoon Lagoon	1998	2018	Splashin' Safari	Interactive water play complex featuring four body slides and a tipping bucket containing 1,000 US gallons (3,800 L) of water. Removed following the 2019 season due to its age.
Hyena Falls	2013	2018/2019	Splashin' Safari	Collection of four enclosed inline tube slides, the largest of which included a half-pipe element. Due to a safety recall, the half pipe was removed prior to the 2019 season. On behalf of its distance from the rest of Splashin' Safari, the rest of the complex was quietly retired following the 2019 season.
Hyena Springs	2013	2019	Splashin' Safari	Children's play area. Quietly removed alongside Hyena Falls.
Raging Rapids in Boulder Canyon	1990	2023	Fourth of July	River rapids ride.
Rudolph's Round-Up	2011	2023	Christmas	Children's sleigh ride

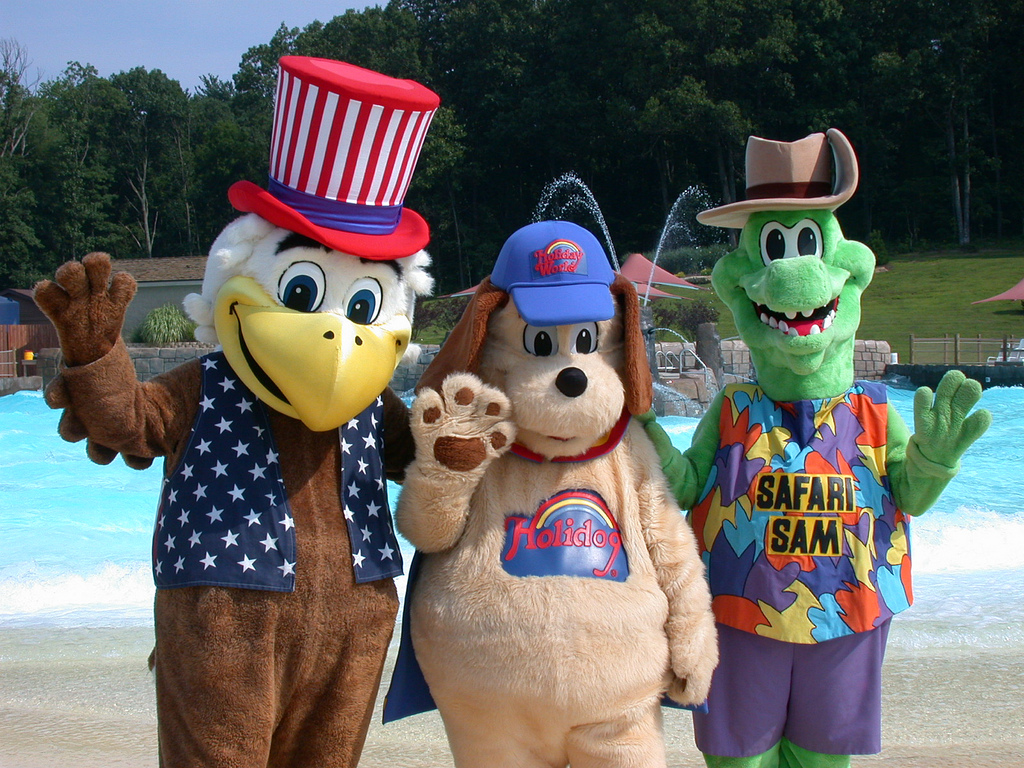
Three of Holiday World & Splashin' Safari's mascots. Left to right: George the Eagle, Holidog, Safari Sam

== Special events ==
- Play Day: Since 1993, Holiday World has hosted children with mental and physical disabilities for an event called "Play Day". Play Day is for invited guests of the Easterseals Rehabilitation Center of Southwestern Indiana. The admission price proceeds are donated to the Easterseals. As of 2011, Holiday World has raised over $257,000 for the Easterseals Rehabilitation Center.
- Walk to Cure Diabetes: Since 2006, Holiday World has hosted walkers for the "Holiday World Walk to Cure Diabetes", which is a walk to raise money for the Juvenile Diabetes Research Foundation International. To raise money, Holiday World donates tickets to walkers who have raised money for the foundation. As of 2011, over $1.7 million has been raised for the foundation with the help of Holiday World.
- HoliWood Nights: HoliWood Nights is an event held for card-carrying members of recognized amusement park-related clubs and their registered guests. The event features exclusive ride time on the park's roller coasters, plus a select few other rides, both before park opening and after park closing. The event, which was first known as Stark Raven Mad, was temporarily discontinued in 2003 following a death during the event. In 2006, the event returned after being renamed HoliWood Nights. The park embraces the pun on Hollywood by naming and theming each year's event after a famous movie.
- Rock the World: Since 2012, Holiday World has hosted a Christian music festival called Rock the World in August. Throughout the day, regional contemporary Christian bands perform in the Hoosier Celebration Theater. After the park closes for the day, a main stage area opens to those with concert tickets. The main stage features a number of nationally known Christian artists and bands who perform past normal closing hours.
- Happy Halloween Weekends: Since 2012, Holiday World has remained open in October to hold an event called Happy Halloween Weekends. During weekends in September and October, the park holds family-friendly, Halloween-themed activities. Some of these seasonal attractions include corn mazes, hayrides, a 3-D walk-through attraction similar to a haunted house, and a family activity area geared towards children.

== Awards ==
In 2004, Holiday World & Splashin' Safari was presented the Applause Award. The park celebrated by installing a large replica of the award's trophy as well as commemorative plaques naming other recipients of the award as part of a fountain in the Christmas section.

Holiday World & Splashin' Safari has also received numerous Golden Ticket Awards, which are presented by Amusement Today magazine to the best of the best in the amusement park industry. It was noted in 2016 that Holiday World had received more Golden Ticket Awards than any other amusement park, at 51.

Golden Ticket Awards
Award	Year	Recipient
Friendliest Park	1998–2008, 2010–2011	Entire park
Cleanest Park	2000–2018	Entire park
Best Wooden Roller Coaster	2000–2003	Raven
Best Waterpark Ride	2003	Zinga
Publisher's Pick: Park of the Year	2004	Entire park
Best New Ride	2006	The Voyage
Best New Waterpark Ride	2006	Bahari River
Best New Waterpark Ride	2007	Bakuli
Best Wooden Roller Coaster	2007–2011	The Voyage
Best New Waterpark Ride	2010	Wildebeest
Publisher's Pick: Legends Series	2010	Will Koch
Best Waterpark Ride	2010–2019	Wildebeest
Best New Waterpark Ride	2012	Mammoth

== Incidents ==
- On May 31, 2003, a 32-year-old woman attending "Stark Raven Mad 2003", an American Coaster Enthusiasts event, died while riding the Raven roller coaster. She was sitting in the last row of the train and was ejected from the car during the coaster's fifth drop. Multiple witnesses reported seeing her "virtually standing up" at one point. CPR was administered until an ambulance arrived, and she was pronounced dead on the way to the hospital. An investigation following the accident showed that the safety restraints were working properly and that there were no mechanical deficiencies on the roller coaster. In 2005, the victim's family filed a lawsuit against Holiday World and Philadelphia Toboggan Coasters, the manufacturer of Raven's train. It was settled out of court in 2007.
- On May 27, 2006, a 20-year-old male park supervisor of the grounds crew died in a mowing accident.
- On July 4, 2007, a 29-year-old woman died after collapsing near the edge of The Wave, one of two wave pools in Splashin' Safari. She fell face-down into a shallow portion of the water. Lifeguards immediately responded and attempted to revive her with help from park medical personnel. She was later pronounced dead at a nearby hospital. It was reported that she had early stage heart disease and died from congestive heart failure.
- On June 20, 2009, a filter pump on Bahari River malfunctioned, sending approximately two dozen guests and employees to the hospital. A very strong concentration of liquid bleach and hydrochloric acid surged in the water when an inactive pump was turned back on. Victims complained of troubled breathing and were given oxygen before being transported to a nearby hospital for further observation. It was later determined that an interlock system malfunctioned, which is designed to prevent the addition of chemicals to the river when the pump is turned off.
- On June 4, 2021, a 47-year-old woman from Brunswick, Ohio who had been riding The Voyage returned to the station unresponsive. EMTs arrived three minutes later and immediately administered first aid and CPR. The coaster was closed for the remainder of the evening out of respect, and reopened the next day after it was determined there were no mechanical problems. The woman later died at a nearby hospital.
