= Gobbler Getaway =

Dark ride at Holiday World

Holiday World & Splashin' Safari
- Area: Thanksgiving
- Status: Operating
- Opening date: May 6, 2006

Ride statistics
- Attraction type: Interactive dark ride
- Manufacturer: Sally Corporation
- Designer: Sally Corporation
- Speed: 1.7 mph (2.7 km/h)
- Height restriction: 30 in (76 cm)

Gobbler Getaway is an interactive dark ride located at Holiday World & Splashin' Safari in Santa Claus, Indiana. It was built by Sally Corporation and is in the park's themed Thanksgiving section. It opened to the public on May 6, 2006.

The ride is centered on the fictional Jamestown-esque "Autumn Falls", where the residents, presented as Pilgrim Fathers, must gather turkeys for the year's Thanksgiving. Riders are equipped with "turkey callers" they use to tag birds as they pass through the town. At the conclusion of the ride, riders' scores are tallied up, and a winner is decided between the four riders in each vehicle.
