= The Howler =

Roller coaster at Holiday World

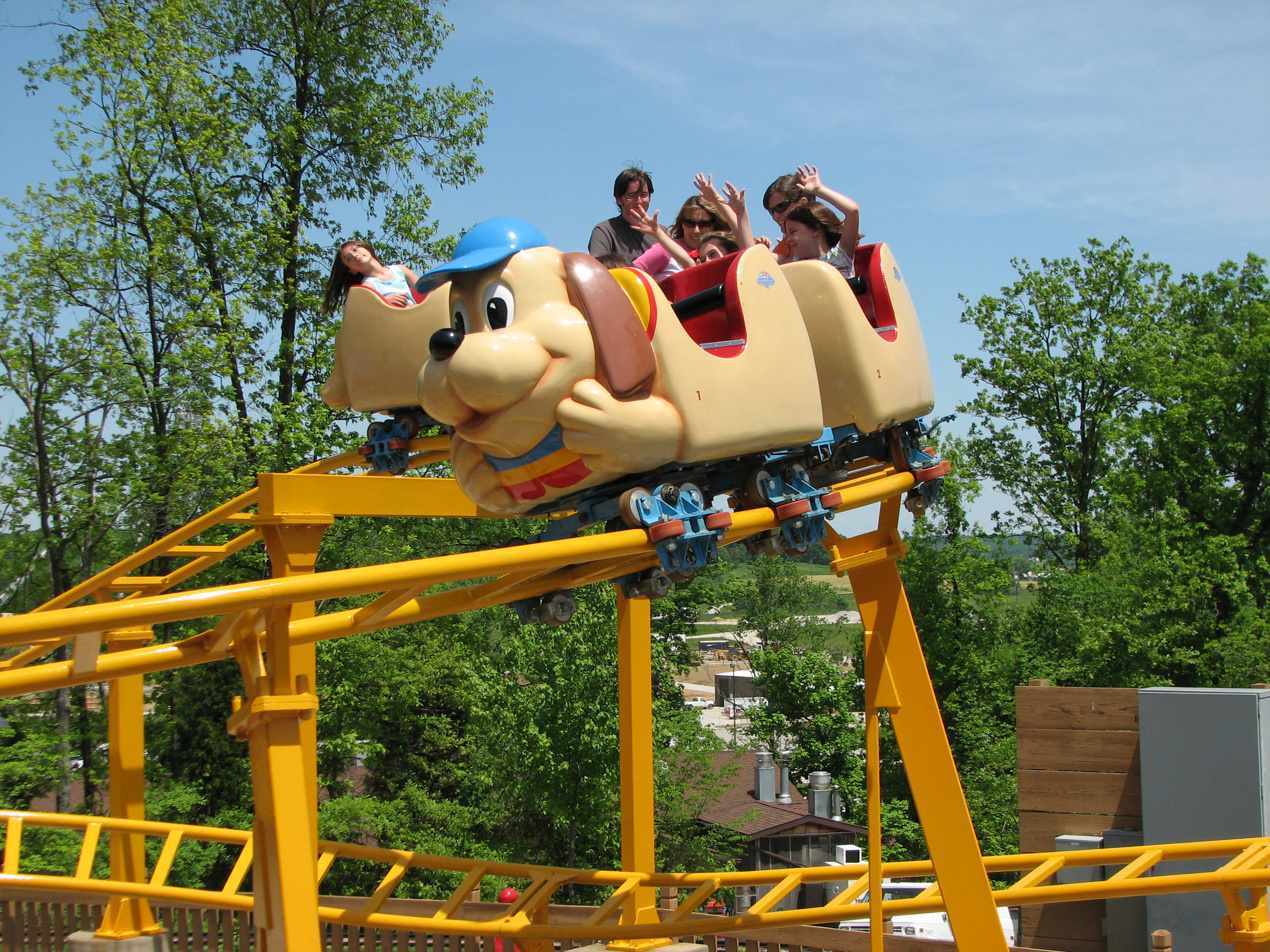

Holiday World & Splashin' Safari
- Location: Holiday World & Splashin' Safari
- Park section: Fourth of July - Holidog's FunTown
- Coordinates: 38.1189°N 86.9103°W
- Status: Operating
- Opening date: May 8, 1999

General statistics
- Type: Steel
- Manufacturer: Zamperla
- Model: Family Gravity Coaster 80STD
- Track layout: Oval
- Lift/launch system: Chain Lift Hill
- Height: 13 ft (4.0 m)
- Length: 262.5 ft (80.0 m)
- Speed: 16 mph (26 km/h)
- Inversions: 0
- Duration: 0:25
- Capacity: 410 riders per hour
- Height restriction: 36 in (91 cm)
- Trains: Single train with 6 cars. Riders are arranged 2 across in a single row for a total of 12 riders per train.
- Must transfer from wheelchair
- The Howler at RCDB

The Howler is a steel kiddie roller coaster at Holiday World & Splashin' Safari in Santa Claus, Indiana. It was built in 1999 by Zamperla as part of a larger expansion project to build Holidog's FunTown, a subsection of the park. It opened on May 8, 1999. The Howler is themed to Holiday World's mascot, Holidog, and features a 12-passenger train with a front car resembling the dog's head and the back car resembling the dog's hind legs and tail.

The Howler is located in the southeasternmost corner of the park within a subsection of the Fourth of July section known as Holidog's FunTown, which is a children's area.

Following the closure of Firecracker in 1997 and prior to the addition of Thunderbird in 2015, it was Holiday World's sole steel coaster.

== History ==
In 1998, Holiday World began making preparations for a new addition to the park by removing the Firecracker roller coaster from the area encircled by the Freedom Train. In its place, the park would build Holidog's FunTown, a children's area featuring a three-story play structure. As part of Holidog's FunTown, Holiday World would also add a small roller coaster.

The Howler opened on May 8, 1999.

== Characteristics ==
=== Train ===
The Howler utilizes a single light brown 12-passenger train meant to resemble Holidog. Each train is made up of six cars that hold two riders each. Each car has one row, each row holding two riders. Each row features a single lap bar that is shared by both riders in each row.

=== Track ===
The total length of the track is 262.5 feet (80.0 m) and it includes a helix. It also features a chain lift hill and fin brakes.
