= Applause Award =

International award to amusement parks

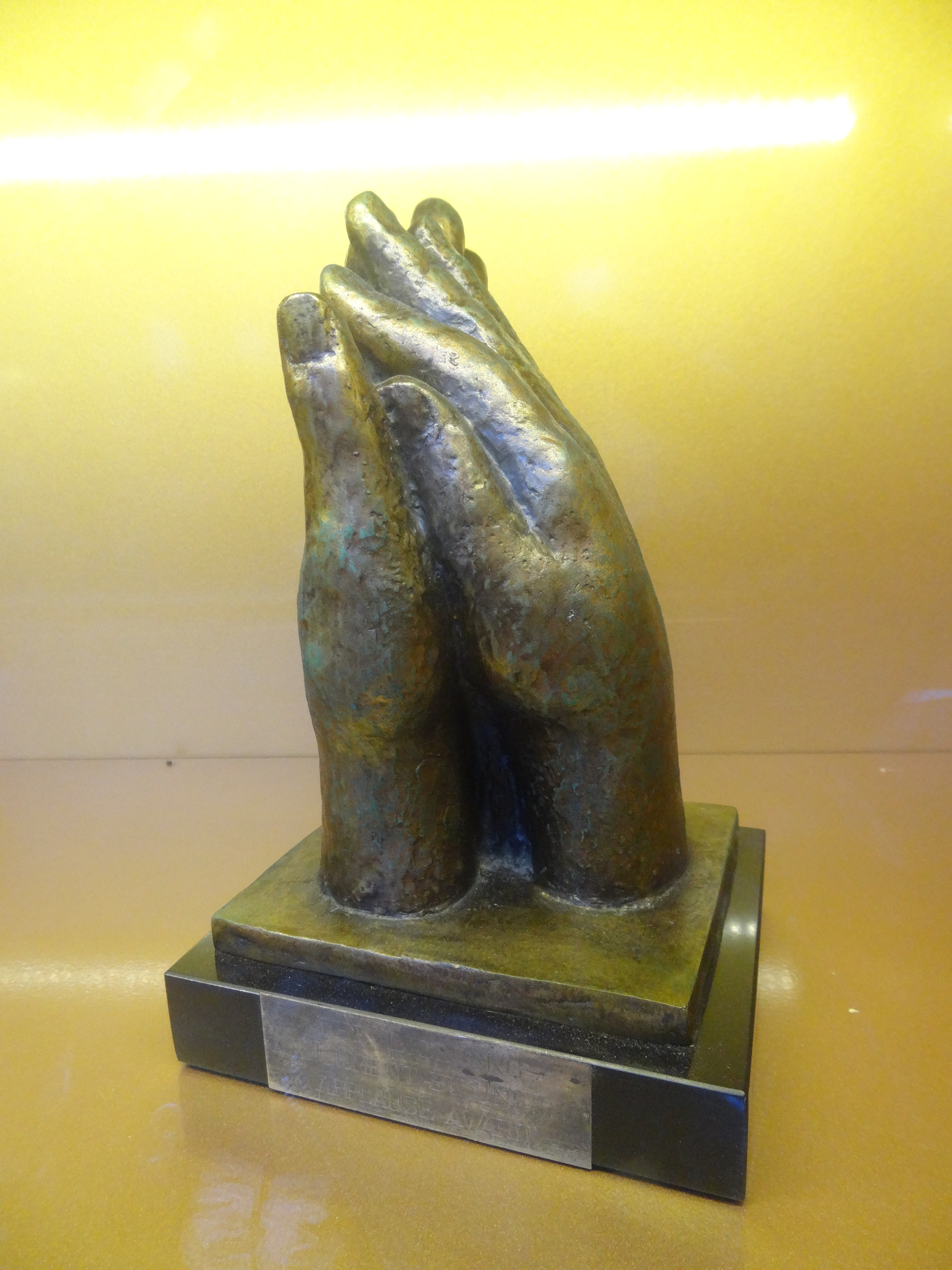
- Awarded for: The finest in amusement parks
- Country: Worldwide
- Presented by: Liseberg
- First award: 1980
- Website: Official website

The Applause Award is an international award given out by Liseberg, a theme park in Gothenburg, Sweden. It is given out every two years to the amusement park whose "management, operations and creative accomplishments have inspired the industry with their foresight, originality and sound business development." The award is a bronze statue of two clapping hands. It was designed by Astri Taube, a Swedish sculptor. The winner is chosen by a board of governors with Liseberg's CEO, Andreas Andersen, being the chairman.

It is considered by many to be the Academy Award of the amusement park industry. In summer of 2020, it was announced that due to the COVID-19 pandemic, the upcoming award ceremony would be postponed until 2021. However, a year later it was again announced that the award had been postponed again, and would resume normally in 2022.

The Applause Award Board of Governors 2018
Chairman
Andreas Andersen	Liseberg
Members
Chris Herschend	Herschend Family Entertainment
Sascha N. Czibulka	Intamin
Tim O´Brien	Author & Journalist
Jim Pattison Jr	Ripley Entertainment
Amanda Thompson O.B.E.	Blackpool Pleasure Beach
Steven C Rhys	FORREC Ltd.
John Wood	Sally Corp.
Michael Mack	Europa Park
Tina Resch	Liseberg
Jakob Wahl	IAAPA

== Recipients ==
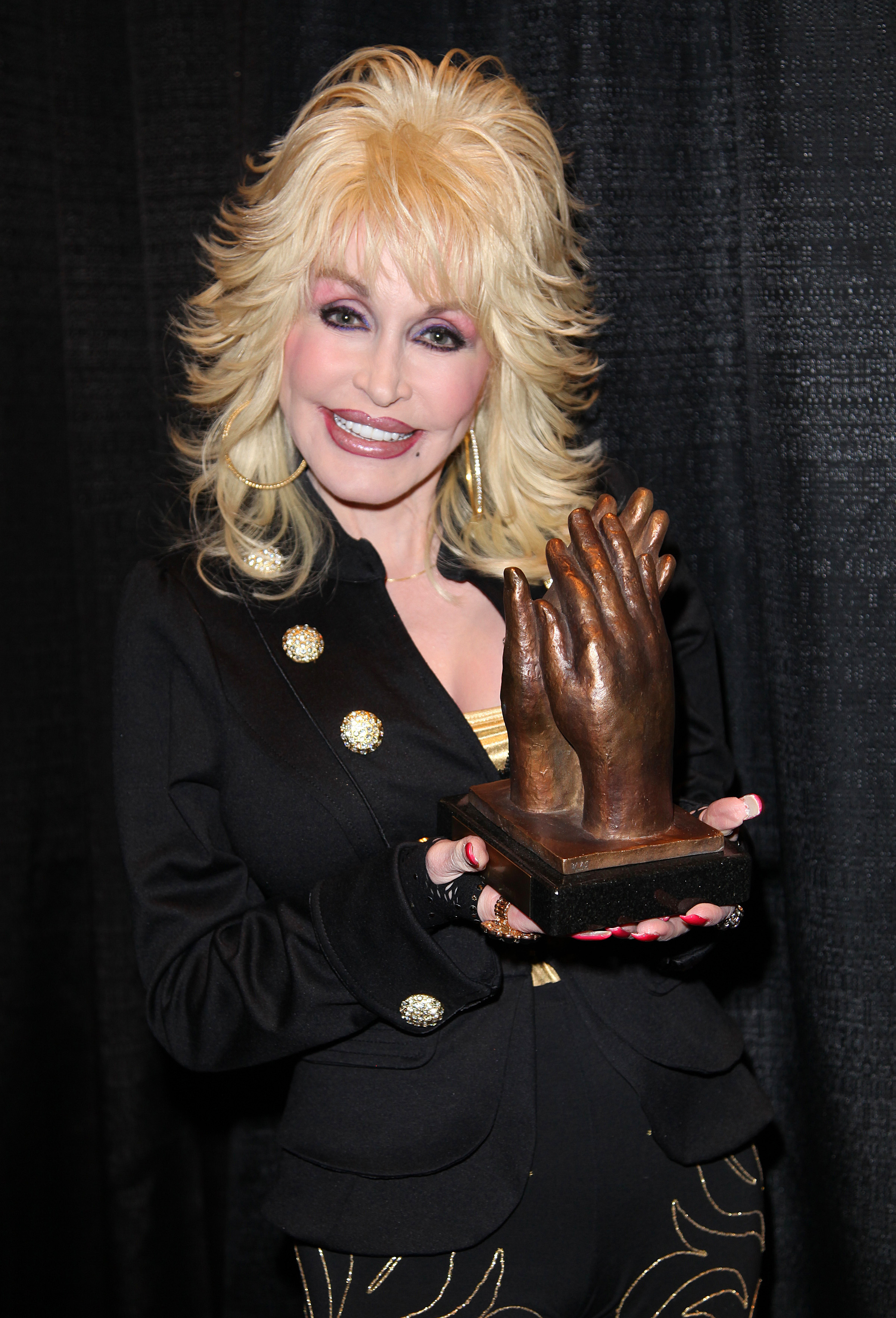
Entertainer and entrepreneur Dolly Parton accepting the Applause Award that she won for Dollywood in 2010.

Year	Park	Award Finalists	Ref(s)
1980	(United States) Magic Kingdom		
1982	(United States) Opryland USA		
1986	(United States) Epcot		
1988	(United States) Knott's Berry Farm		
1990	(Germany) Europa Park	• Busch Gardens Williamsburg • De Efteling • Opryland USA • SeaWorld San Diego • Universal Studios Hollywood	
1992	(Netherlands) Efteling	• Universal Studios Florida	
1994	(United States) Universal Studios Florida		
1996	(United States) Cedar Point	• Busch Gardens Williamsburg • Six Flags Magic Mountain • Universal Studios Hollywood	
1998	(United States) Silver Dollar City	• Kennywood • Parc Astérix	
2000	(United States) Hersheypark	• Pleasure Beach Blackpool • Parc Astérix	
2002	(United States) Busch Gardens Williamsburg	• Gardaland • Pleasure Beach Blackpool	
2004	(United States) Holiday World & Splashin' Safari	• Gardaland • Tivoli	
2006	(United States) Islands of Adventure	• Dollywood • Legoland Billund	
2008	(Guatemala) Xetutul Theme Park	• SeaWorld San Diego	
2010	(United States) Dollywood	• Alton Towers • Phantasialand	
2012	Ocean Park Hong Kong	• Santa Cruz Beach Boardwalk • Puy du Fou	
2014	(France) Puy du Fou	• Chimelong Paradise • PortAventura Park	
2016	(United States) Busch Gardens Tampa	• Legoland Billund • Siam Park	
2018	(Mexico) Xcaret Park	• PortAventura Park • Universal Studios Japan	
2022	(Japan) Tokyo DisneySea		
2024	(Spain) Siam Park		
2025	Universal Studios Japan		
2026	(United Arab Emirates) Warner Bros World Yas Island, Abu Dhabi		
