= Thunderbird (Holiday World) =

Steel roller coaster at Holiday World

Holiday World & Splashin' Safari
- Location: Holiday World & Splashin' Safari
- Park section: Thanksgiving
- Coordinates: 38.124246°N 86.908957°W
- Status: Operating
- Soft opening date: April 24, 2015
- Opening date: April 25, 2015
- Cost: $22 million

General statistics
- Type: Steel – Wing Coaster – Launched
- Manufacturer: Bolliger & Mabillard
- Model: Wing Coaster
- Lift/launch system: LSM
- Height: 140 ft (43 m)
- Length: 3,035 ft (925 m)
- Speed: 60 mph (97 km/h)
- Inversions: 4
- Duration: 1:18
- Capacity: 1140 riders per hour
- Acceleration: 0 to 60 mph (0 to 97 km/h) in 3.5 seconds
- Height restriction: 48–78 in (122–198 cm)
- Trains: 2 trains with 5 cars; riders arranged 4 across in a single row for a total of 20 riders per train
- Thunderbird at RCDB

Thunderbird is a steel roller coaster located in the Thanksgiving section of Holiday World & Splashin' Safari in Santa Claus, Indiana. Designed by Bolliger & Mabillard, the ride opened to the public on April 25, 2015, as the eighth Wing Coaster in existence and the fourth in the United States. Thunderbird launches at maximum speeds of 60 mph (97 km/h) in 3.5 seconds, and features a 125-foot-tall (38 m) vertical loop, the tallest on any Wing Coaster. It was the first launched Wing Coaster in the United States, and it would remain the only one until the 2025 opening of Rapterra at Kings Dominion.

== History ==
On July 24, 2014, Holiday World announced that a new steel roller coaster would be added to the park's ride lineup for the 2015 season. The Wing Coaster, to be called Thunderbird, would become the park's first major steel coaster, as well as the first launched Wing Coaster in the United States. It would feature four inversions, including a 140-foot-tall (43 m) Immelmann loop, a 125-foot-tall (38 m) vertical loop, a zero-g roll, and an in-line twist. Another notable aspect mentioned during the unveiling was the pre-show that occurs prior to launch, consisting of fog, lighting, and sound effects, all to simulate a thunderstorm.

The track and supports began arriving at the park the following week. By October, the first two inversions were topped off. The new trains were on display during the 2014 IAAPA Expo. The track construction was completed by early December 2014.

Thunderbird officially opened to the public on April 25, 2015. Prairie Farms Dairy released an ice cream flavor called "Thunderbird" to advertise the new ride, consisting of vanilla ice cream with caramel and roasted pecans.

== Ride experience ==
After loading in the station, the train moves forward and briefly stops. Mist blows in front of the train and thunder sounds as the train launches from 0 to 60 miles per hour (97 km/h) in 3.5 seconds by linear synchronous motors. The train immediately enters a 140 feet (43 m) Immelmann loop. Following the Immelmann loop, the train then descends its first drop into a 125 feet (38 m) vertical loop. After the vertical loop, the train crosses over the valley between The Voyage's second and third hills, traverses an overbanked turn, and then goes through an overbanked elevated spiral. The train then goes through a zero-g roll. After several curves next to The Voyage's triple-down drop and "spaghetti bowl", the train dips down into a barn, where it then curves left back into the barn via an in-line twist. Once the in-line twist ends, the train enters the brake run and returns to the station. A full cycle of the ride lasts about 1 minute and 18 seconds.

== Characteristics ==
=== Location ===
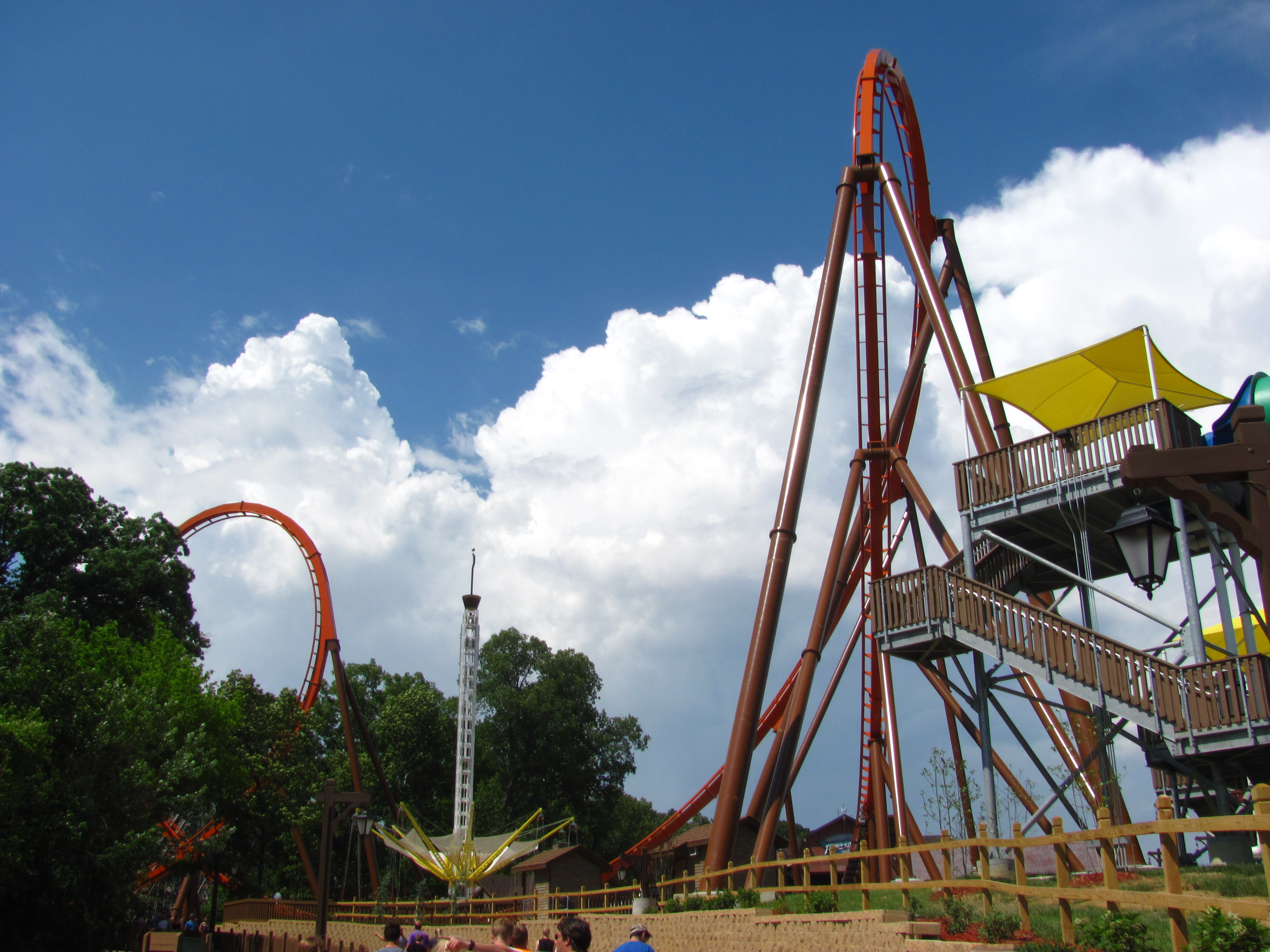
Thunderbird's first two inversions

Thunderbird is located in the Thanksgiving section of the park alongside The Voyage, and it runs parallel with and crosses over The Voyage twice.

PGAV Destinations was the theming designer for Thunderbird. The designers took the Thunderbird name and coaster design and created a visual theme of the legendary bird's powerful flight through farms and forests of southern Indiana.

=== Manufacturer ===
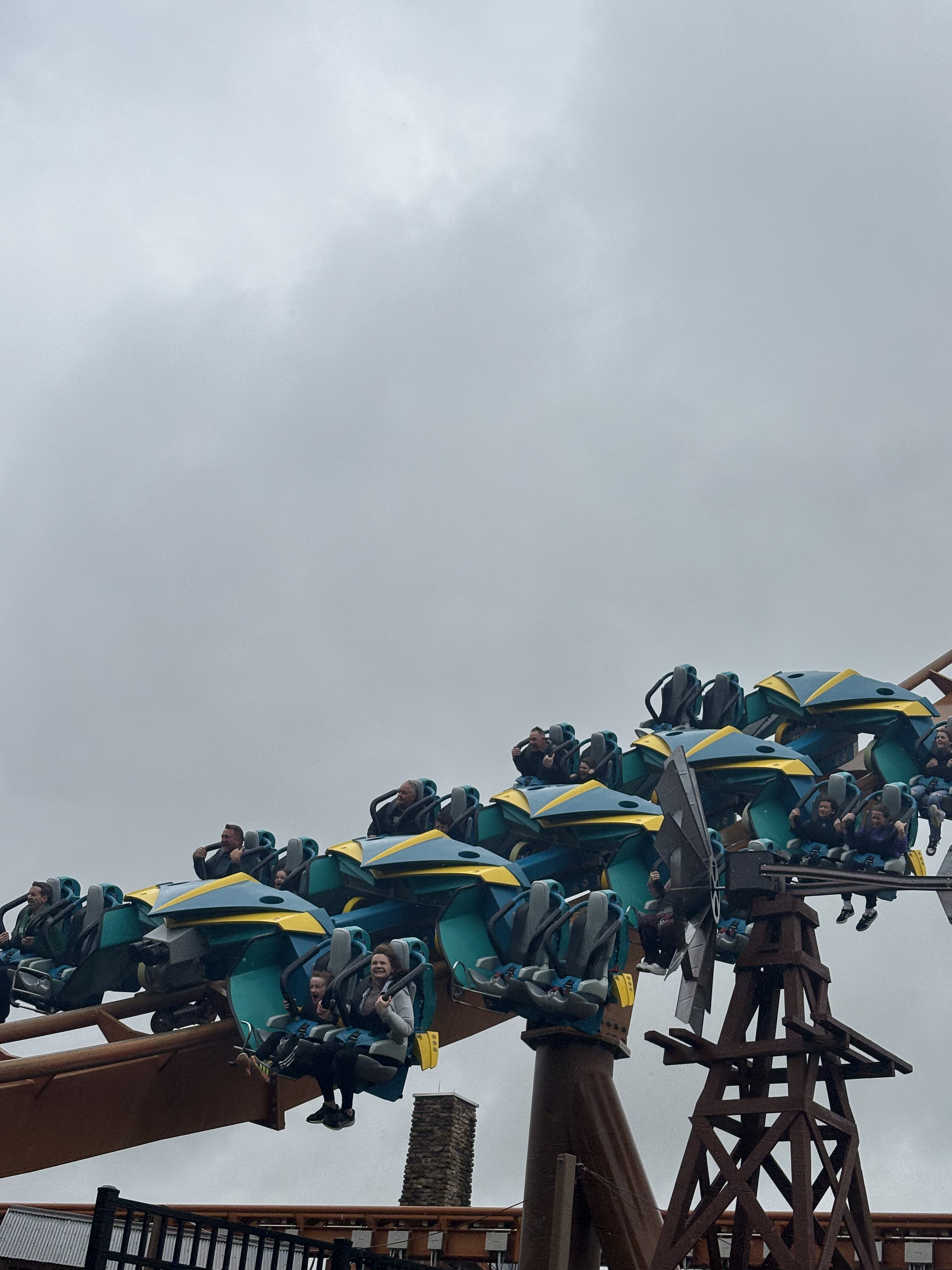
Thunderbird after its first inversion

Thunderbird is a Wing Coaster model manufactured by Swiss roller coaster firm Bolliger & Mabillard. It was Holiday World & Splashin' Safari's first large-scale steel roller coaster. Thunderbird is the eighth Wing Coaster to be built, and the fourth in the United States. Thunderbird was the first Bolliger & Mabillard coaster to utilize an LSM launch.

=== Trains ===
Thunderbird operates with two steel and fiberglass trains. Each train has five cars of four seats each, with two on each side of the track. Each train holds 20 riders and the ride has a capacity of 1,140 riders per hour. Because the seats are placed on the sides of the track, rather than directly on top of it, a cantilevered steel arm is used to support the seats.

=== Track ===
Thunderbird's steel track is 3,035 feet (925 m) long, and the tallest part of the ride is the first inversion, an Immelmann loop at 140 feet (43 m).

=== Launch system ===
Every launch requires 2.5 megawatts of power, with the energy being stored in electric generators with two 24,000-pound flywheel assemblies. The launch system mechanics are located in a separate building known as Will Power. The name came from the park's former president Will Koch, who died in 2010.

== Reception ==
Thunderbird came in fifth place for the title of Best New Ride for 2015 in Amusement Today's Golden Ticket Awards with 9.5% of the vote.

Golden Ticket Awards: Best New Ride for 2015
Ranking	5
