= Airtime (rides) =

Feeling of weightlessness experienced on an amusement ride

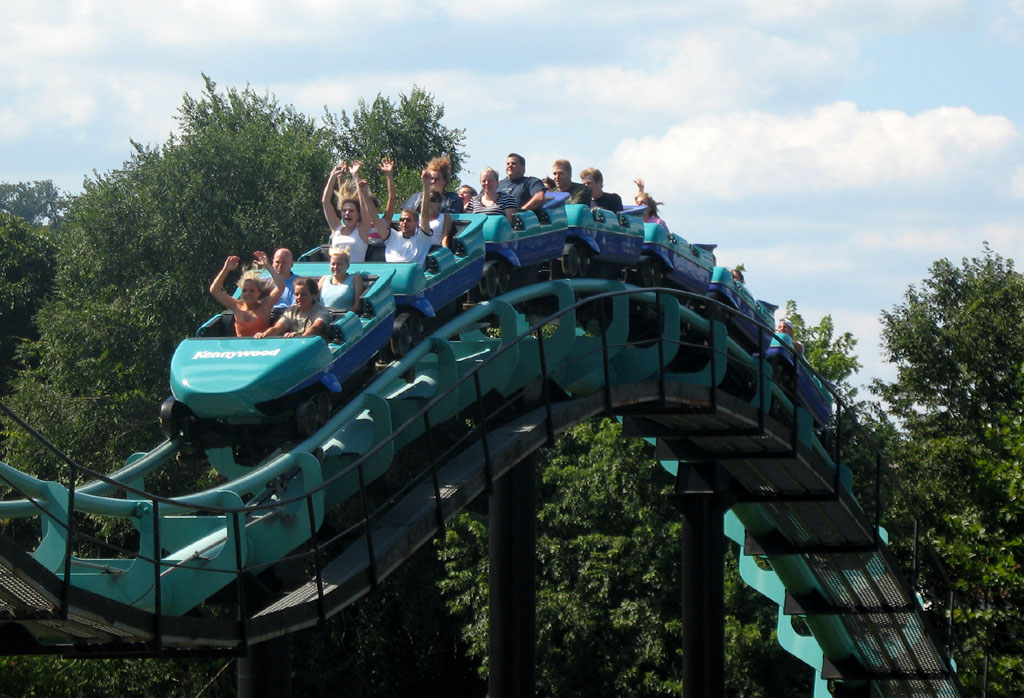
A camelback hill is a common way of achieving airtime on a roller coaster, as seen on Phantom's Revenge at Kennywood

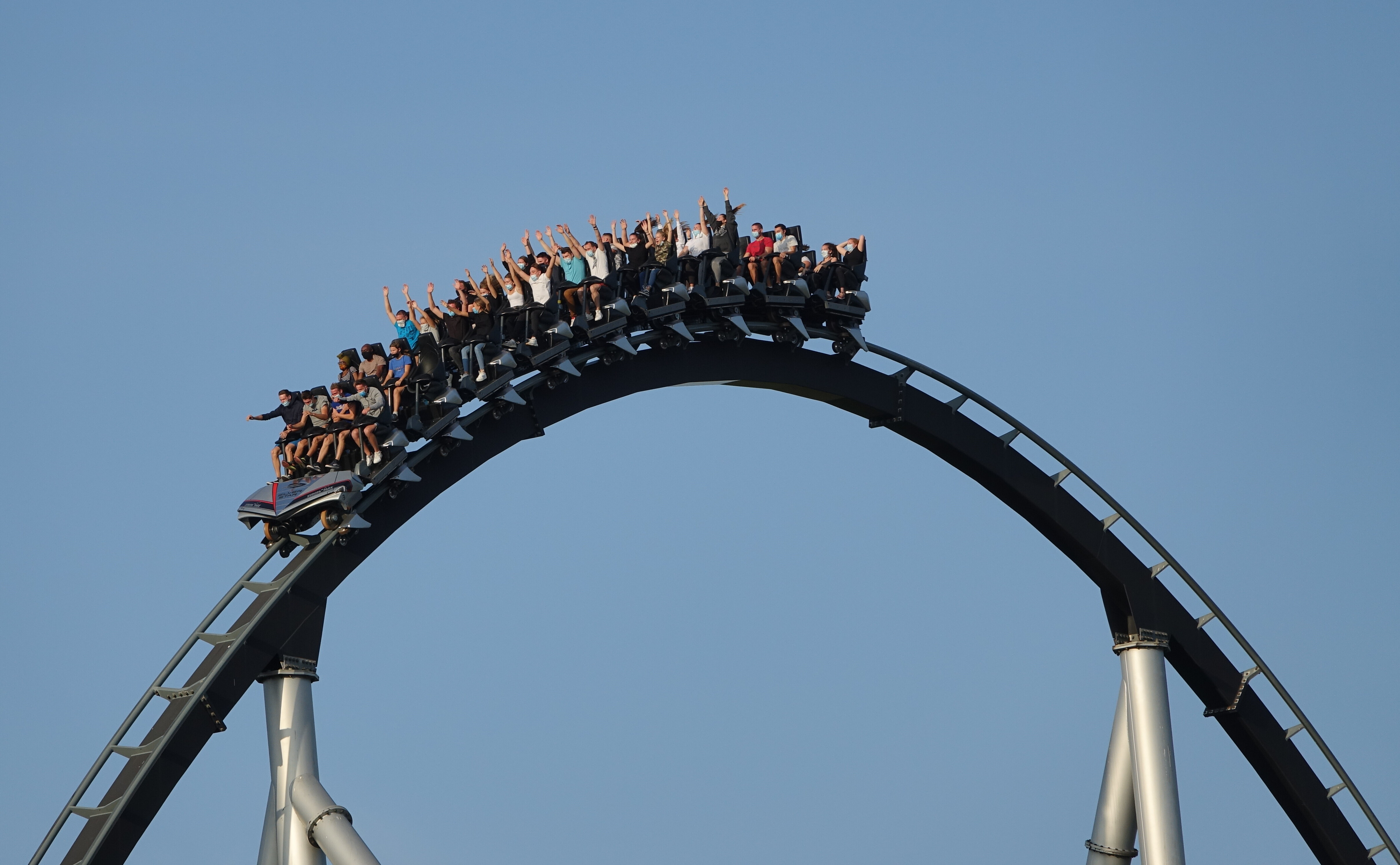
Another camelback hill on Silver Star at Europa-Park

Airtime (also known as air time or air-time) is the time during which riders of an amusement ride such as a roller coaster experience zero or negative vertical g-forces. The negative g-forces that a rider experiences is what creates the sensation of floating out of one's seat. With roller coasters, airtime is usually achieved when the train travels over a hill at high speeds. There are different types of airtime, including floater (which is slower and sustained) and ejector (which is sudden and strong).

Hypercoasters, such as Magnum XL-200 at Cedar Point and Phantom's Revenge at Kennywood, along with larger wooden roller coasters, such The Voyage at Holiday World and El Toro at Six Flags Great Adventure, are rides known for having particularly high amounts of airtime.

In 2001, the Guinness World Records recorded Superman: Escape from Krypton, located at Six Flags Magic Mountain, to subject upon riders a then-record six and a half seconds of airtime. Upon opening in 2018 at Cedar Point, Steel Vengeance set the record for the most airtime on a roller coaster at 27.2 seconds.

== Physics ==
Airtime is a result of the effects of the inertia of the train and the riders. As the train goes over a hill transitioning from an ascent into a descent guided by the rails, the inertia of the (albeit loosely) attached riders causes them to momentarily continue upwards, resulting in the riders being lifted out of their seats. The duration of airtime on a particular hill is dependent on the velocity of the train, gravity, and the radius of the track's transition from ascent to descent. Zero-g, where the net vertical g-force is zero, is achieved when the downward acceleration of the train is equal to that of gravity. When the downward acceleration is greater, negative g-forces arise.

Airtime is generally understood to fall under two categories: "floater" airtime and "ejector" airtime. Floater airtime provides passengers with the sensation of gently floating upwards, similar to weightlessness. Ejector is more violent and sudden, producing a sharp moment of negative g-forces lifting riders up off their seats before slamming them back down.

The zero-gravity roll is an inversion specifically designed to create the effect of weightlessness and thereby produce airtime. Flat rides, especially drop towers, can also provide airtime.
