= Raven (roller coaster) =

Wooden roller coaster at Holiday World

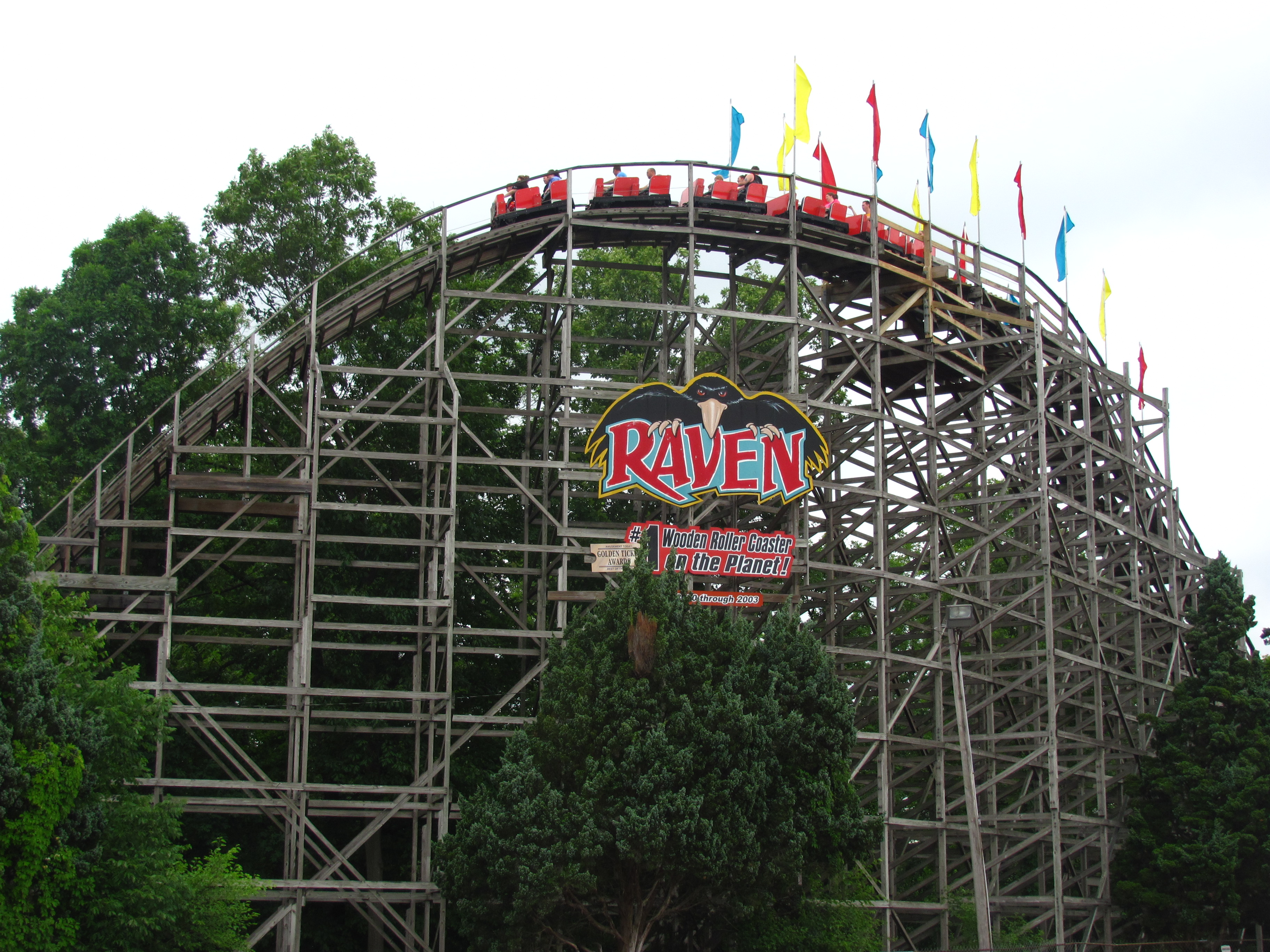

Holiday World & Splashin' Safari
- Location: Holiday World & Splashin' Safari
- Park section: Halloween
- Coordinates: 38.1194°N 86.9152°W
- Status: Operating
- Opening date: May 6, 1995
- Cost: US$2,000,000

General statistics
- Type: Wood
- Manufacturer: Custom Coasters International
- Designer: Dennis McNulty, Larry Bill
- Track layout: Terrain
- Lift/launch system: Chain Lift Hill
- Height: 80 ft (24 m)
- Drop: 85 ft (26 m)
- Length: 2,800 ft (850 m)
- Speed: 48 mph (77 km/h)
- Inversions: 0
- Duration: 1:30
- Capacity: 960 riders per hour
- Height restriction: 48 in (122 cm)
- Trains: 2 trains with 6 cars; riders arranged 2 across in 2 rows for a total of 24 riders per train
- Must transfer from wheelchair
- Raven at RCDB

Raven is a wooden roller coaster in Holiday World & Splashin' Safari's Halloween section in Santa Claus, Indiana. It was designed and built in 1994 by the now-defunct Custom Coasters International, and opened to the public on May 6, 1995. The coaster takes its name from Edgar Allan Poe's poem "The Raven". The ride has been well-received since its opening, having been awarded the title of Best Wooden Roller Coaster in the Golden Ticket Awards by Amusement Today for several years. It was named an ACE Coaster Landmark by American Coaster Enthusiasts on June 23, 2016.

== History ==
=== Development ===
Plans for a new wooden roller coaster were first conceived by park president Will Koch. Koch contacted Custom Coasters International and plans for the then-unnamed roller coaster began to form. The roller coaster remained unnamed until August 1994, when Koch invited magazine editor and fellow amusement park lover Tim O'Brien to tour the site of the future roller coaster. During that tour it was O'Brien who first suggested the name Raven, deriving the idea from Edgar Allan Poe's poem "The Raven". The name was soon made official and construction on Raven began.

On May 6, 1995, Raven was opened to the public. The roller coaster debuted with a single 24-passenger train made by Philadelphia Toboggan Coasters. The ceremonial first train was dispatched with one empty seat, after Leah Koch, the daughter of Will Koch, opted not to ride. The seat was instead reserved for the spirit of Edgar Allan Poe, who had published "The Raven" exactly 150 years earlier.

=== Changes ===
In 2005, Raven received a second 24-passenger train. Adding the second train improved Raven's capacity from 700 riders per hour to 960 riders per hour.

In order to accommodate and store the second train when it was not being used, a transfer track was built along the straightaway prior to the lift hill. A transfer track allows a portion of the track to be moved and redirected to a storage bay. This allows an unused train to be stored during normal operation, and also provides an additional area for maintenance crews to inspect the train.

The change to two-train operation also necessitated a change in the coaster's control system. Prior to 2005, the ride was operated manually, as the ride operator would push a button to release the brakes and position the train in the station. This type of control system allowed the ride to be operated by a single ride operator. In 2005, an automatic control system was added. The automatic control system automatically controls braking, positioning, and the block system. This type of control system also necessitates that two ride operators be present to dispatch the train from the station.

During the 2020-2021 off-season, Raven was given a refurbishment. The ride's trains were repainted with new wing decals on both sides, and 25% of the track was replaced.

== Characteristics ==
=== Trains ===
Raven uses two 24-passenger trains built by Philadelphia Toboggan Coasters. Each train is made of six cars that hold four riders each. Each car has two rows, each row holding two riders. Each row features a seat divider, two individual ratcheting lap bars, and two individual seatbelts.

=== Track ===
The wooden track on Raven is made from eight layers of Southern yellow pine, with a single layer of running steel along, the top, sides, and underside of the track where the train's wheels make contact with it. The support structure of the ride is also wooden. The total length of the track is 2,800 feet (850 m), and includes 85 foot (26 m) and 61 foot (19 m) drops, in addition to a 120 foot (37 m) long aboveground tunnel. The track features a chain lift hill and three block sections. Raven utilizes fin brakes.

== Incident ==
On May 31, 2003, Tamar Fellner, a 32-year-old woman from New York, died after falling out of Raven. Fellner was visiting the park to attend "Stark Raven Mad 2003", an event hosting roller coaster enthusiasts from around the country. At approximately 8:00 pm, Fellner and her fiancé boarded Raven in the last row of the train. Following a safety check of her lap bar and seat belt by a ride operator, the train left the station. Multiple witnesses reported that they saw Fellner "virtually standing up" during the ride's initial and subsequent drops. During the ride's 69 feet (21 m) fifth drop, Fellner was ejected from the car and onto the tracks. When the train returned to the station, Fellner's fiancé, ride operators, and a passenger who was a doctor ran back along the tracks, at which point they found Fellner lying under the structure of the roller coaster at the fifth drop. The doctor, aided by park medical personnel, began CPR until an ambulance arrived. Fellner was pronounced dead on the way to the hospital.

An investigation following the accident showed that Fellner's safety restraints were working properly and that there were no mechanical deficiencies on the roller coaster. However, Fellner's family filed a lawsuit in 2005 against Holiday World and Philadelphia Toboggan Coasters. The lawsuit was settled out of court in 2007, and the terms of the settlement were not disclosed.

== Awards ==
Golden Ticket Awards: Top wood Roller Coasters
Year									1998	1999
Ranking									2	2
Year	2000	2001	2002	2003	2004	2005	2006	2007	2008	2009
Ranking	1	1	1	1	3	5	7	7	10	11
Year	2010	2011	2012	2013	2014	2015	2016	2017	2018	2019
Ranking	9	12	8	11	13	12	15	23	18	21
Year	2020	2021	2022	2023	2024	2025	2026			
Ranking	N/A	17	24	26	35	37 (tie)	32			
