= Buddha Mountain (Thailand) =

Limestone hill with a large Buddha image near Na Chom Thian and Pattaya

Coordinates: 12°45′52″N 100°57′21″E

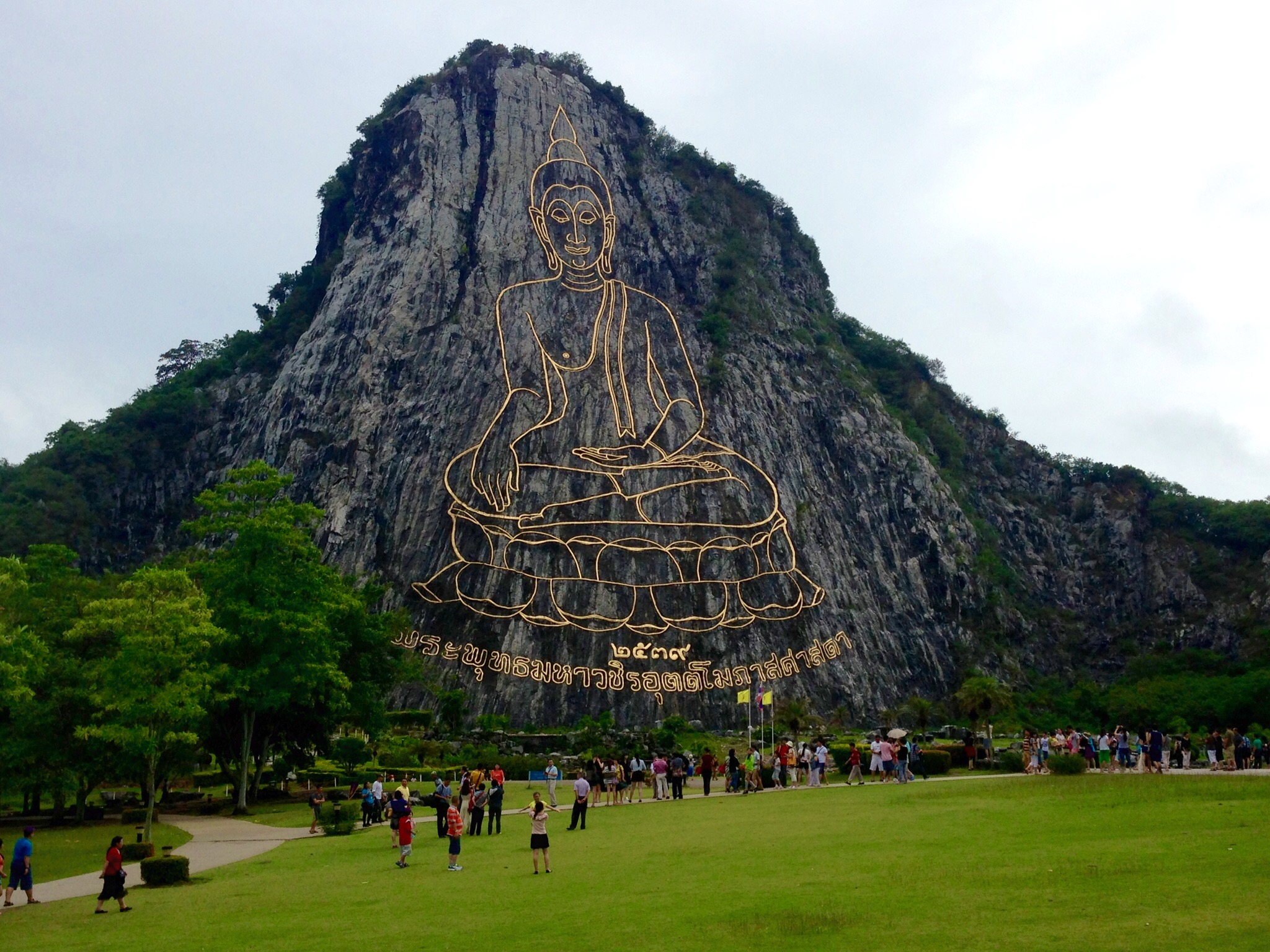
The Buddha Mountain (Khao Chi Chan) with the 109 metres (358 ft) x 70 metres (230 ft) golden Buddha image.

The Buddha Mountain or Khao Chi Chan (Thai: เขาชีจรรย์) is a limestone hill in Na Chom Thian that has become a Pattaya landmark due to its large 109 m (358 ft) by 70 m (230 ft) golden Buddha laser engraving. It was created in 1996 to commemorate the 50th anniversary of the coronation of His Majesty King Bhumibol Adulyadej, and for Thai people and Buddhists for spiritual practice. The Khao Chi Chan Buddha image is the largest carved Buddha image in the world.

The area surrounding the mountain is full of heavy clusters of grasses, shrubs, and trees including teak, acacia, Siamese rosewood, black rosewood, and various fruit trees such as Indian gooseberry, black plum, and ramontchi. The lush green surroundings seen in the 2020s go back to the development of the Siri Charoenwat Forest Plantation Project in 1990, named after Queen Sirikit, which was initiated by His Majesty King Bhumibol Adulyadej in 1992 on the occasion of Sirikit's 60th birthday.

The Buddha Mountain together with the nearby Buddhist monastery Wat Yansangwararam Woramahawihan, the royal Chinese temple Viharn Sien, the Nong Nooch Tropical Garden, Silverlake Vineyard and the National Park form a large tourist attraction near Na Chom Thian, Jomtien and Pattaya.

The Buddha Mountain is a popular place for leisure activities, mediation, celebrations, and dance performances. As of 2016, Thai, Chinese and Russian tourists made up the majority of visitors to the area. According to the Forest Training Department, around 1,000 monkeys were living around the mountain in 2015.

== Buddha image ==
In 1995, Somdet Phra Yanasangworn moved to prevent further mineral extraction from destroying a mountain – the Buddha Mountain or Khao Chi Chan. Stone from the mountain had been used to build the runways for the Royal Thai Air Force - United States Air Force military base, U-Tapao Royal Thai Navy Airfield during the Vietnam War.

King Bhumibol ordered the drawing of an outline of the Buddha with advanced equipment, and the completion of the project under the supervision of Crown Prince Maha Vajiralongkorn. After the face of the mountain was flattened, teams from the Phra Chomklao Technology Institute in Thonburi used laser technology in January 1996 to penetrate the limestone. They cut the outline of a Buddha image, that would become the largest line-edged Buddha image in the world and a permanent religious representation of Thailand. The Buddha image was later inlaid with gold leaf, blessing the mountain with permanent status as a sacred site. The guided laser technology used was the first of its kind, introduced to carve the image of Lord Buddha.

== Nearby places ==
- Wat Yansangwararam
- Viharn Sien
- Nong Nooch Tropical Garden
