= Na Chom Thian =

Na Chom Thian นาจอมเทียน
- Subdistrict
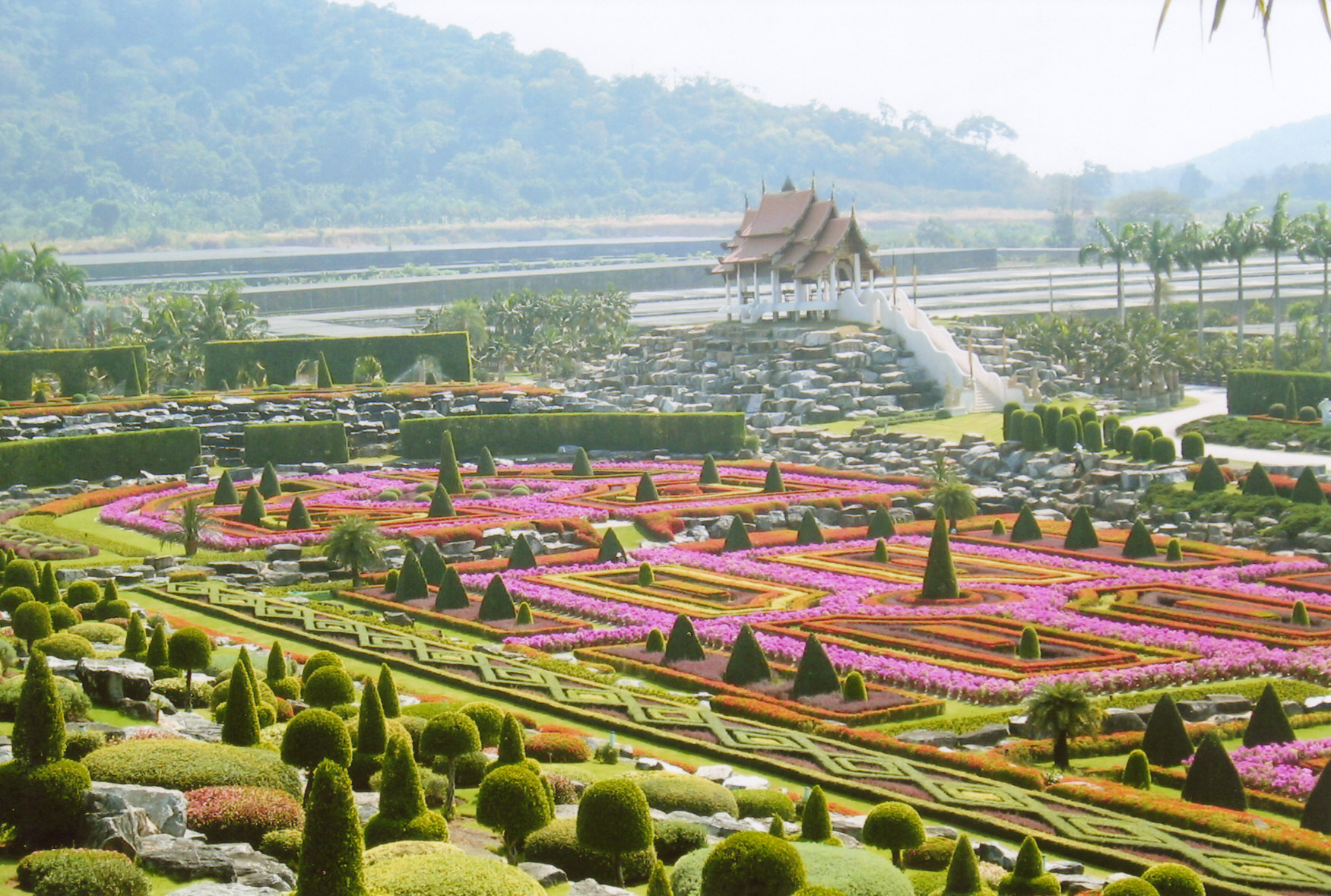
- Nong Nooch Tropical Garden

- Location within Thailand
- Coordinates: 12.7871°N 100.9320°E
- Country: Thailand
- Province: Chonburi
- District: Sattahip

Population (2010)
  - Total: 13,305
- Time zone: UTC+7 (ICT)
- Postal code: 20250

Na Chom Thian or Na Jomtien (Thai: นาจอมเทียน, pronounced [nа̄ː.t͡ɕɔ̄ːm.tʰīan]) is a town and tambon (subdistrict) in Sattahip District of Chon Buri Province, on the southern fringe of Pattaya. It is known for its attractions such as Nong Nooch Tropical Garden, Wat Yanasangwararam, Buddha Mountain (Khao Chi Chan), natural parks and sandy beaches.

== Geography ==
Na Chom Thian is 175 kilometres (109 mi) southeast of Bangkok in Sattahip District, Chonburi Province of Thailand. Na Chom Thian is bordered by the subdistricts of Na Kluea and Huai Yai (part of the city of Pattaya) to the north, the subdistrict of Samnak Thon in Ban Chang District, Rayong Province, to the east, and the subdistricts of Phlu Ta Luang and Bang Sare in Sattahip District to the south. The region has a group of small, isolated mountains to the east and southeast and borders the Gulf of Thailand to the west. The coast is defined by Ban Amphur Beach (RTGS: Ban Amphoe), which continues south from Pattaya's Jomtien Beach.

The western part of the subdistrict falls under the local government of Na Chom Thain Subdistrict Municipality (thesaban tambon), while the non-municipal areas are administered by the Na Chom Thian Subdistrict Administrative Organization.

== Places of Interest ==
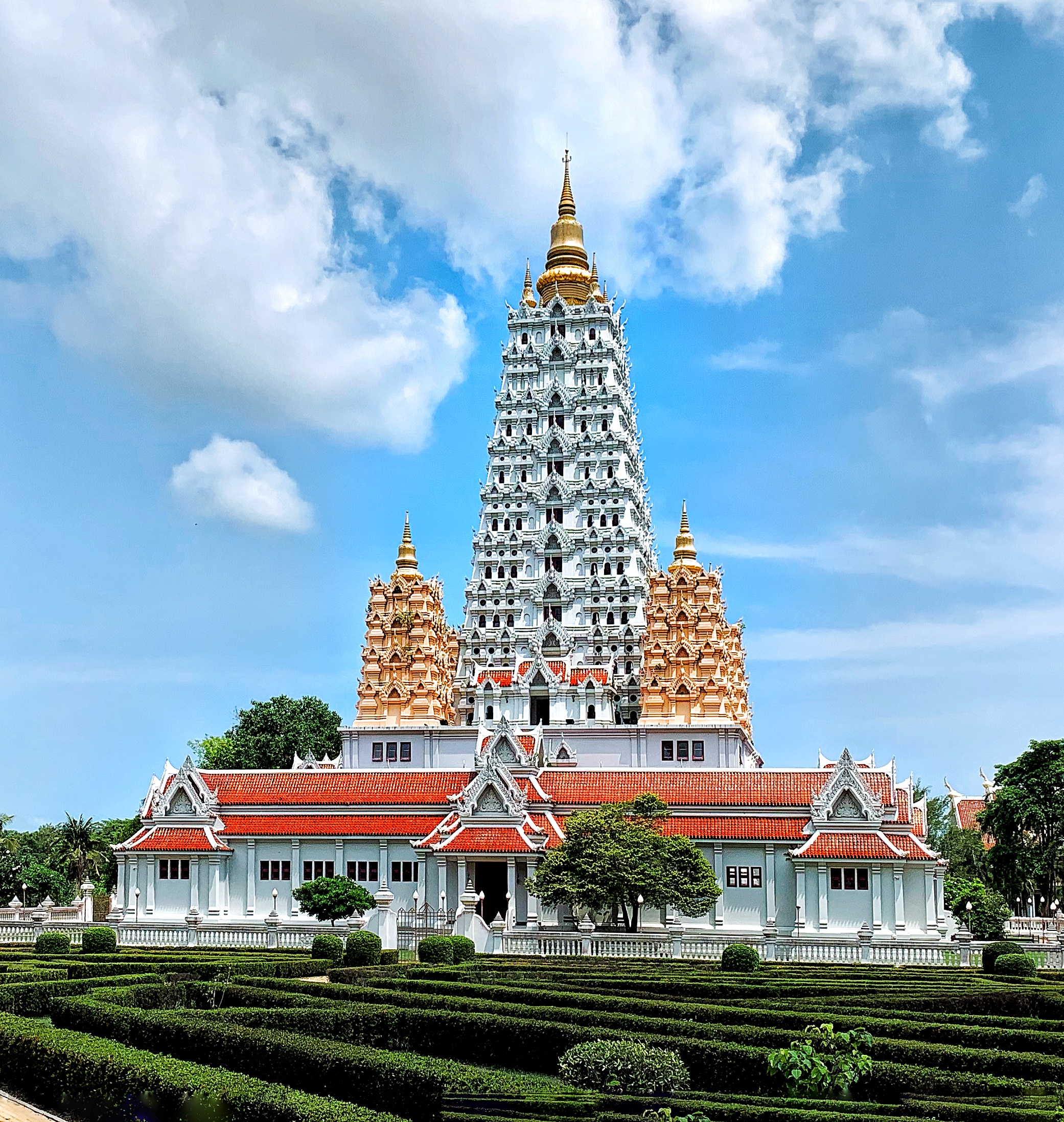
Wat Yanasangwararam temple

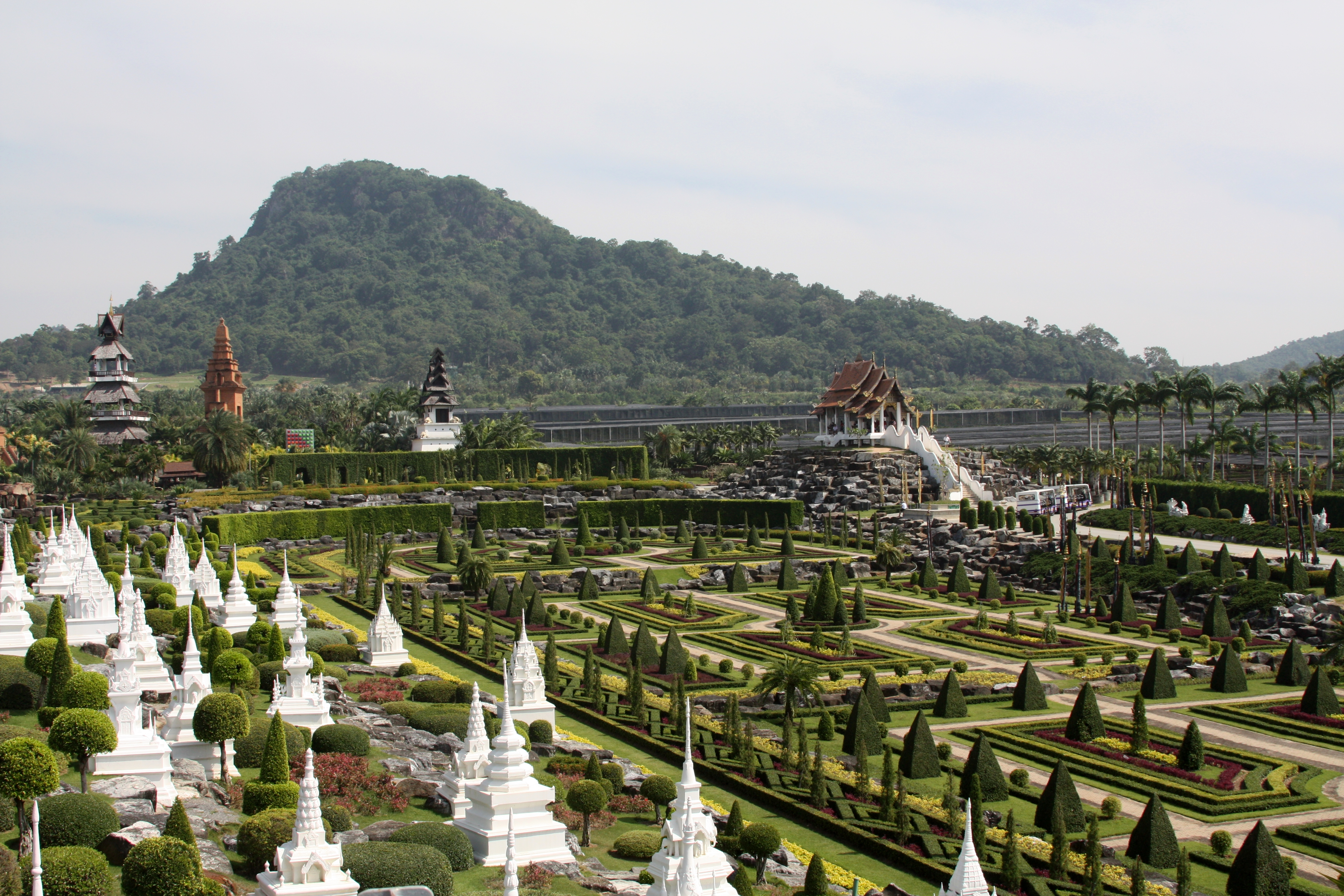
Nong Nooch Tropical Garden

The Nong Nooch Tropical Garden, a popular tourist destination in Thailand for its exhibition of Cycads from Tropical Asia, South America and Central Africa regions, is located in Na Chom Thian. The adjacent limestone hill, the 'Big Buddha Mountain' (Khao Chi Chan) with a large 109 metres (358 ft) engraved Buddha image, attracts people on an international level. Other gems nearby such as the Royal Chinese temple Viharnra Sien, the 'National Wildlife Park' and the Buddhist temple Wat Yanasangwararam or Wat Yan with its small parks offer space for walking and relaxing in a green setting. Wat Yan was under the auspices of king Bhumibol Adulyadej.

Located close to the coast is the Ramayana Water Park, a large water theme park in Thailand. It is the site of numerous skyscrapers, hotel, residential and resort developments. Along Sukhumvit Road, there are seafood restaurants and cozy coffee shops on both sides. The Tiger Park and Pattaya Floating Market are popular tourist attractions near Pattaya.
