= Columbia Pictures Aquaverse =

Waterpark in Sattahip, Chonburi, Thailand

- Previously known as Cartoon Network Amazone (2014–2022)

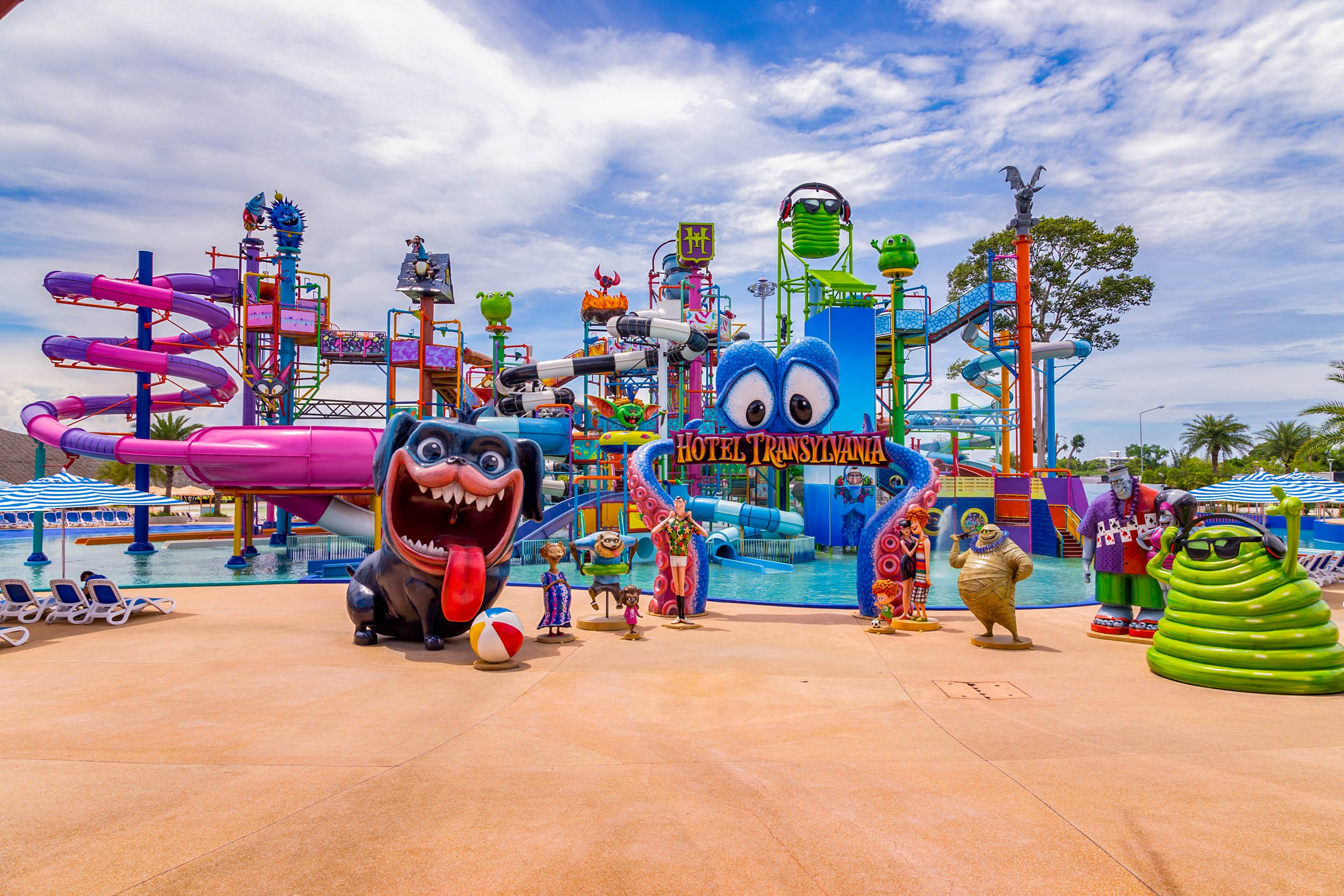
- Interactive map of Columbia Pictures Aquaverse
- Location: Sattahip, Chonburi, Thailand
- Coordinates: 12.7851°N 100.9143°E
- Status: Operating
- Opened: October 3, 2014; 11 years ago (as Cartoon Network Amazone) October 12, 2022; 3 years ago (as Columbia Pictures Aquaverse)
- Operated by: Amazon Falls Co., Ltd (licensed from Sony Pictures)
- Theme: Columbia Pictures movies & entertainment
- Operating season: Year-round
- Area: 14 acres (5.7 ha)

Attractions
- Total: 10
- Water rides: 7
- Website: Official website

Columbia Pictures Aquaverse (Thai: โคลัมเบีย พิคเจอร์ส อควาเวิร์ส) is a theme park created by Sony Pictures Entertainment’s Columbia Pictures. It is located at 888 Moo 8, Na Jomtien, Sattahip, Chonburi, Thailand, which is approximately 18.2 kilometers from Pattaya. It is opened on October 12, 2022, and operated by Amazon Falls Co., Ltd, which was designed and constructed under the supervision of Sony Pictures Entertainment.

Columbia Pictures Aquaverse features various entertainment attractions such as themed rides inspired by Columbia Pictures films, blockbuster movie-themed shows, light and sound entertainment, food and drink attractions such as a food hall with various cuisines, a Tiki themed bar, themed hotels inspired by Sony Pictures’ intellectual properties, an onsen and spa, movie and music entertainment, and a concert venue.

Columbia Pictures Aquaverse’s themed ride zone has been recognized by CNN Travel as one of the world's best new theme parks, named Best Asian Themed Park at the MATFA Golden Horse Awards 2023.

== History ==
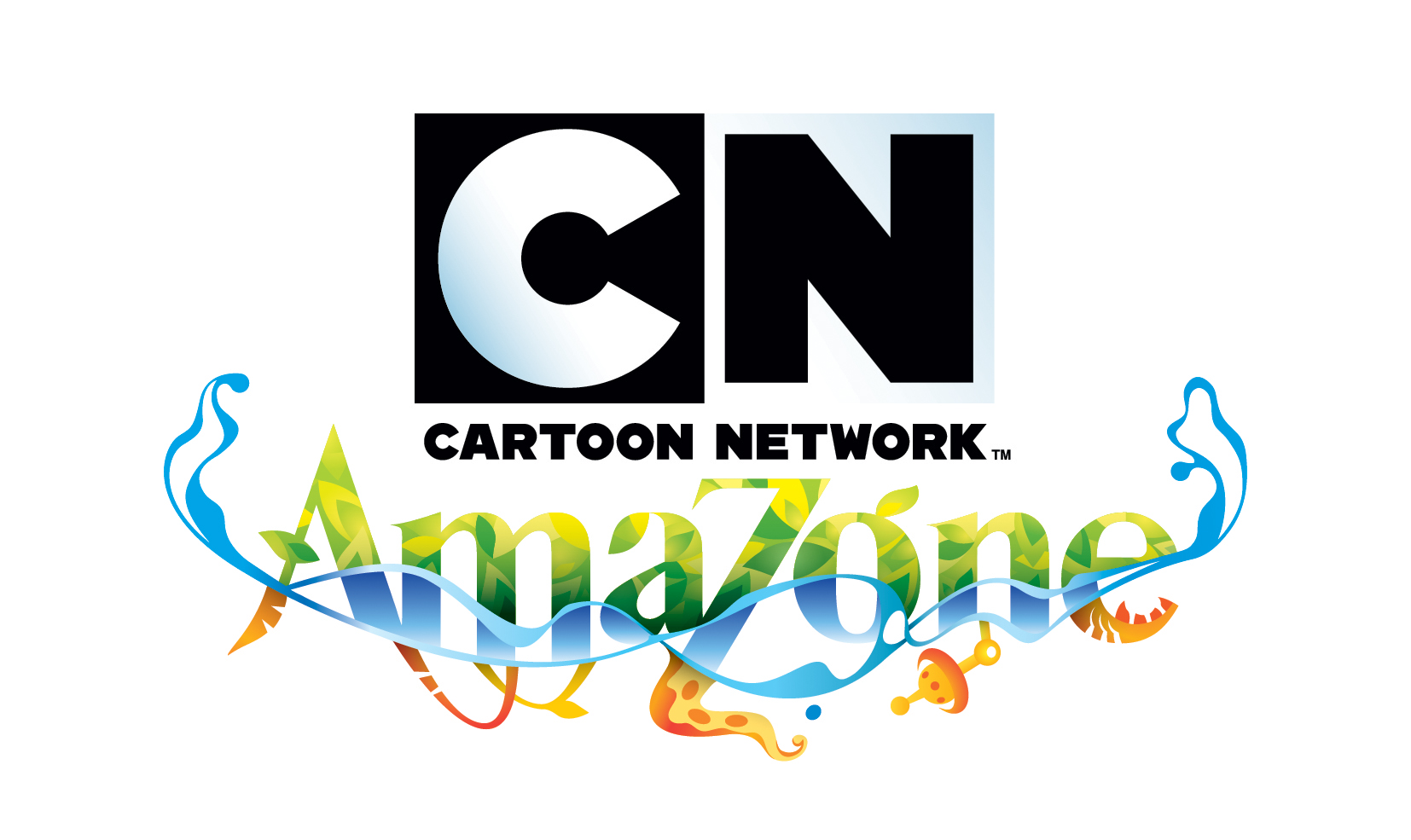
Cartoon Network Amazone logo (2014–2022)

The park originally launched as Cartoon Network Amazone, which was operated by Amazon Falls Company Limited. It was a family-friendly experience with themed zones and activities inspired by Cartoon Network characters.

Construction began in 2012 by the main road in Na Jomtien close to Bang Saray beach. The waterpark's opening date was scheduled in the Fourth quarter of 2013, but was postponed due to delayed construction. In August 2014 the park was opened only for annual pass members and invited guests. On Friday, October 3, 2014, Cartoon Network Amazone opened to the public.

The park benefited from Thailand's EEC development plans, which included improvements in infrastructure, such as being close to U-Tapao Airport and a new high-speed rail project.

The park was temporarily closed during the COVID-19 pandemic and underwent a rebranding during this time. On October 12, 2022, it reopened under its new name, Columbia Pictures Aquaverse.

== Park layout ==
Columbia Pictures Aquaverse spans 14 acres and features a variety of attractions, including multiple water slides, a surf simulator, a water play area, a mini-golf course, a lazy river, and an outdoor go-kart track. The park also boasts a wave pool with advanced audio-visual elements.

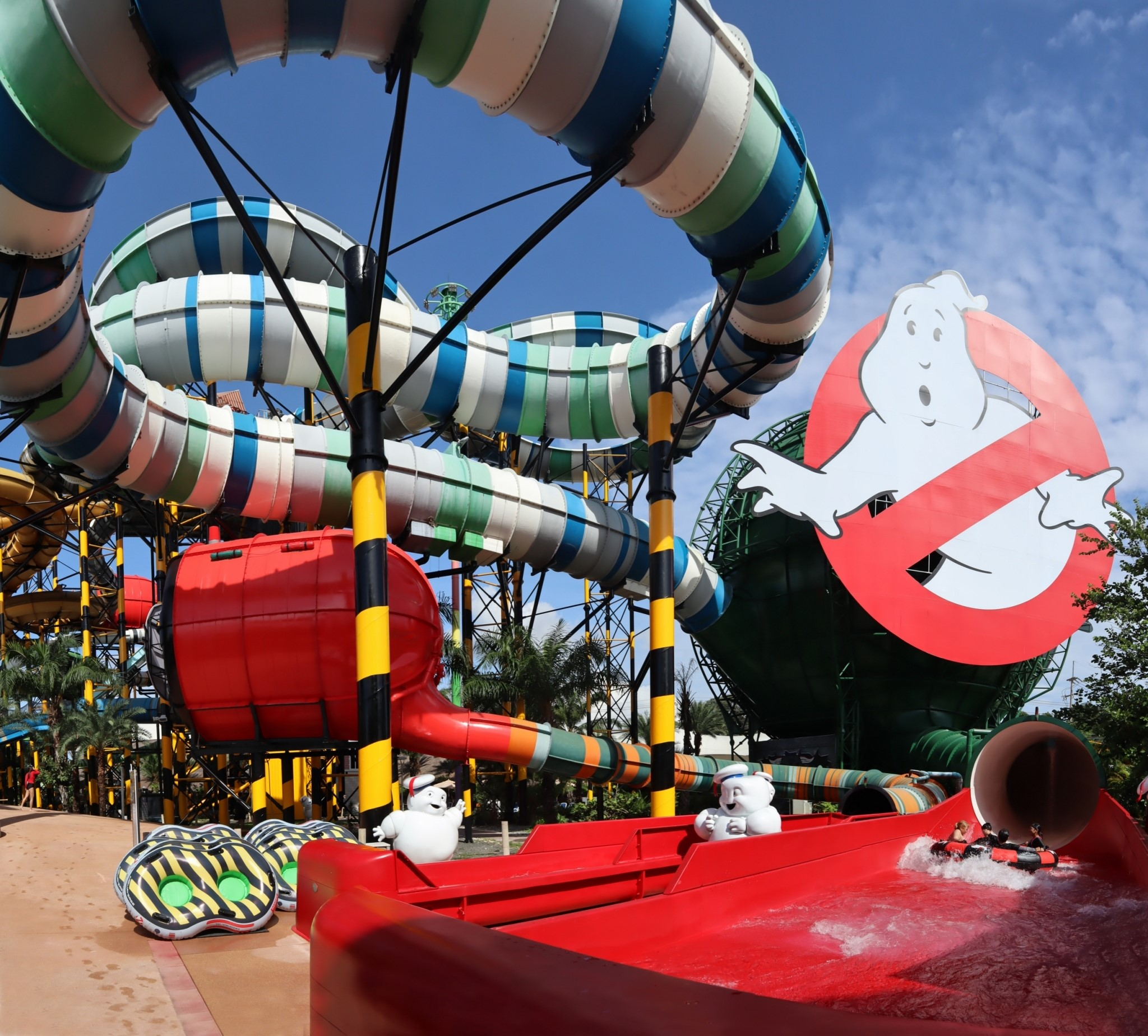
Ghostbuster Zone

Ghostbusters Zone

Inspired by the popular Ghostbusters film franchise, this attraction features a supernatural-themed water slide. Visitors enter through a replica of the Ghostbusters' firehouse and experience a ride that includes elements such as ghost traps and characters like Slimer, providing a unique water coaster experience. This is the first Ghostbusters-themed water slide in Asia.

Jumanji Zone

This attraction is inspired by the Jumanji film series and features Jaguar Mountain, a jungle-themed area with water slides. Visitors can experience slides designed to simulate being pursued by Mandrills, culminating in a splash pool.

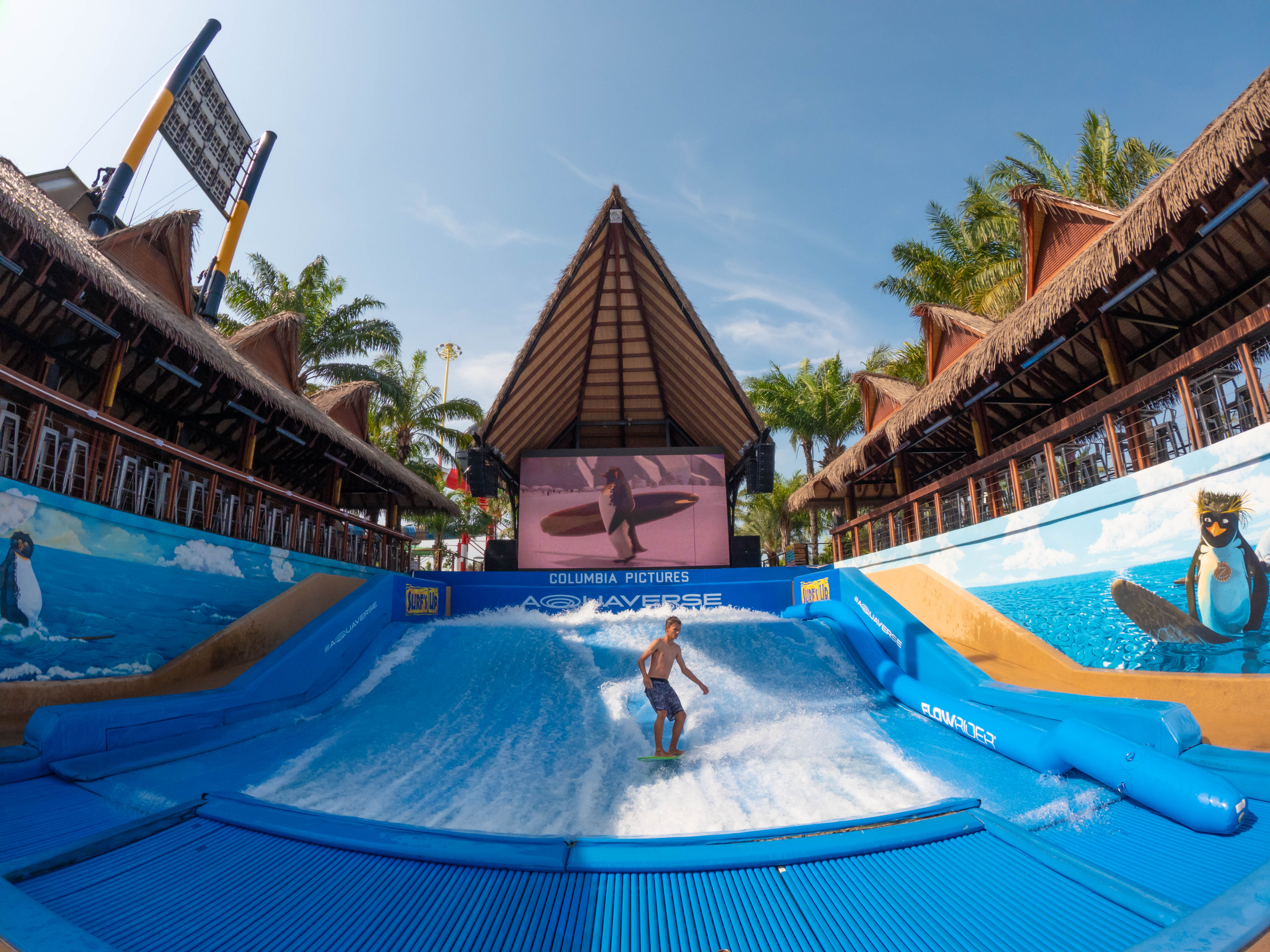
Surf's Up Flowrider

Surf's Up

This attraction features a FlowRider machine that simulates wave riding. It is themed around the animated film Surf's Up, which follows a penguin's journey in the world of competitive surfing.

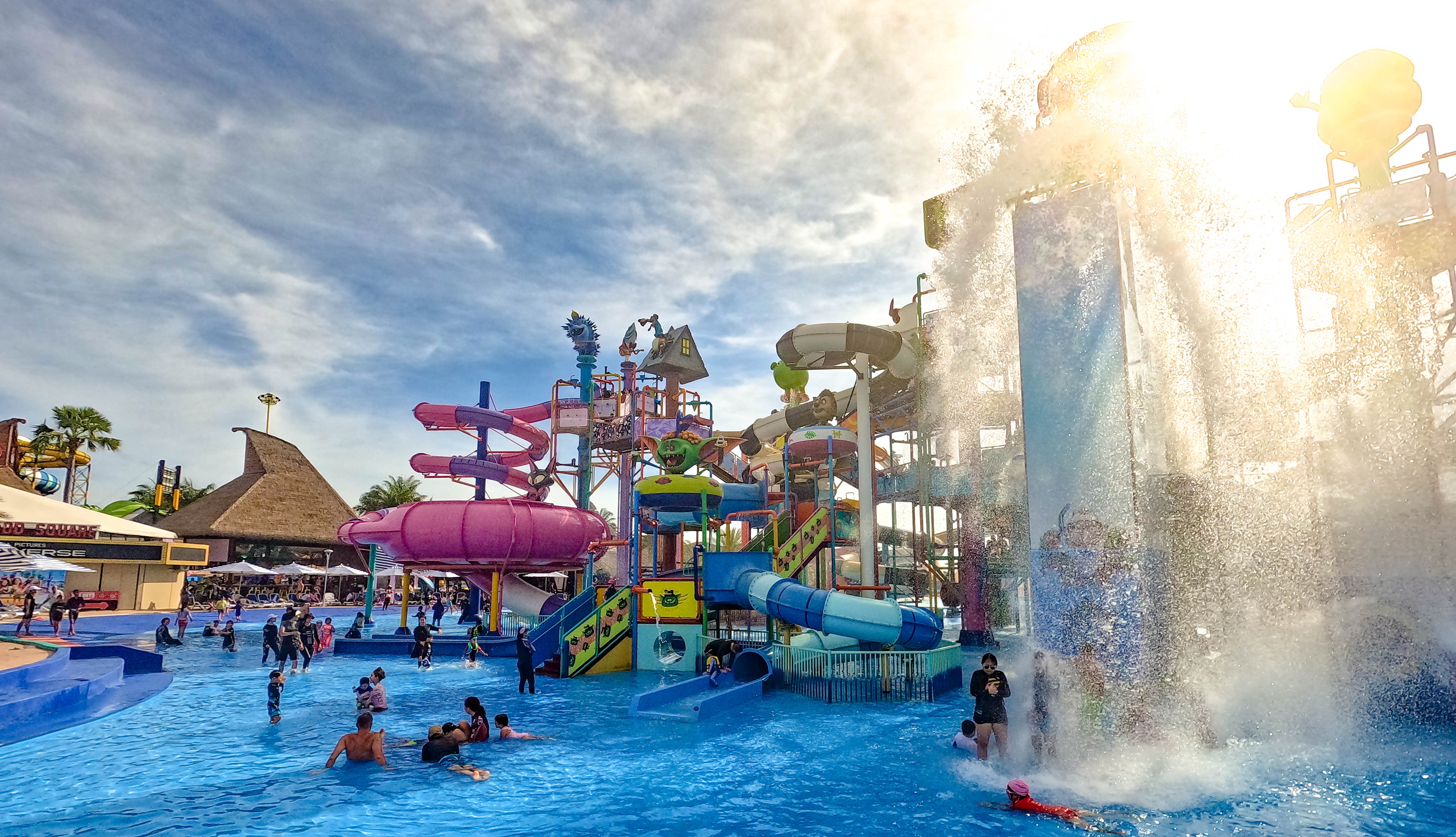
Hotel Transylvania Zone

Hotel Transylvania

This water playground is themed around the Hotel Transylvania film series and is the largest branded aqua playground in Southeast Asia. It features nine slides and over 100 water attractions, including water rockets and large splash buckets.

Cloudy with a Chance of Meatballs

This attraction is a river adventure through Swallow Falls, featuring settings and characters inspired by the film, including whimsical "Foodimals" and food-themed elements.

Zombieland Zone

This section offers several water attractions inspired by the Zombieland film series. Highlights include a 12-meter free-fall slide, a 360-degree spinning ride, and Asia’s steepest body slide.

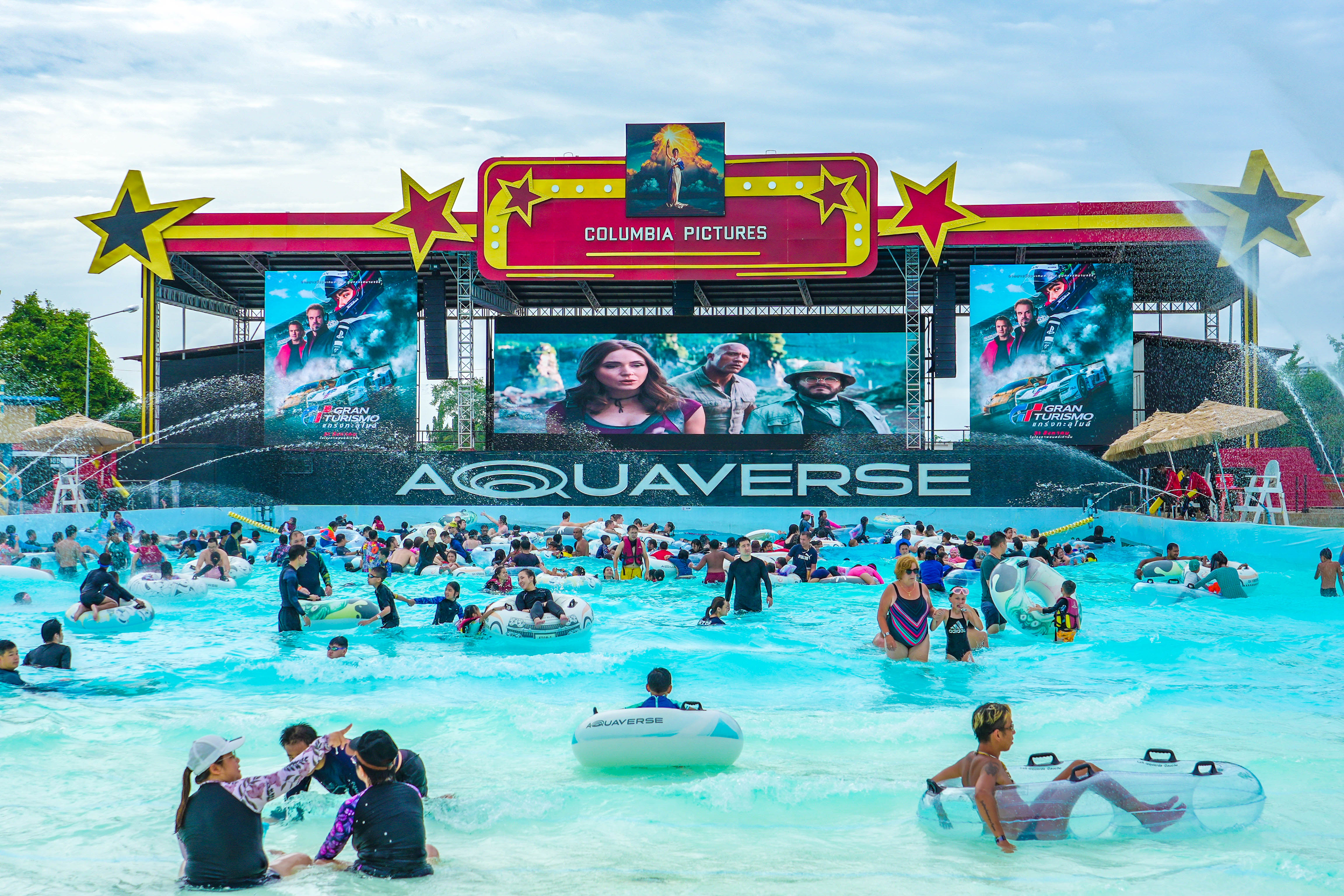
Aquaverse Mega Wave Pool

Aquaverse Mega Wave Pool

The Mega Wave Pool at Aquaverse is an artificial wave pool that hosts daily movie screenings on its LED screens, as well as special events and concerts.

Gran Turismo Go-Kart Circuit

This go-kart circuit is inspired by the Gran Turismo movie, based on the popular video game series.

The Emoji Movie Mini Golf

A mini golf course themed around The Emoji Movie, featuring obstacles inspired by the film.
