= Buddha Mountain =

Buddha Mountain may refer to:

- Buddha Mountain (film), a 2010 Chinese film.
- Buddha Mountain (Thailand) or Khao Chi Chan, a place in Thailand.
- Burkhan Khaldun, one of the Khentii Mountains in the Khentii Province of northeastern Mongolia believed to be the birthplace of Genghis Khan as well as his tomb.
- Foshan, a place in Guangdong, China, whose name literally means "Buddha Mountain".

== See also ==
- Thousand Buddha Mountain
- Leshan Giant Buddha
