= AquaLoop =

Type of water slide

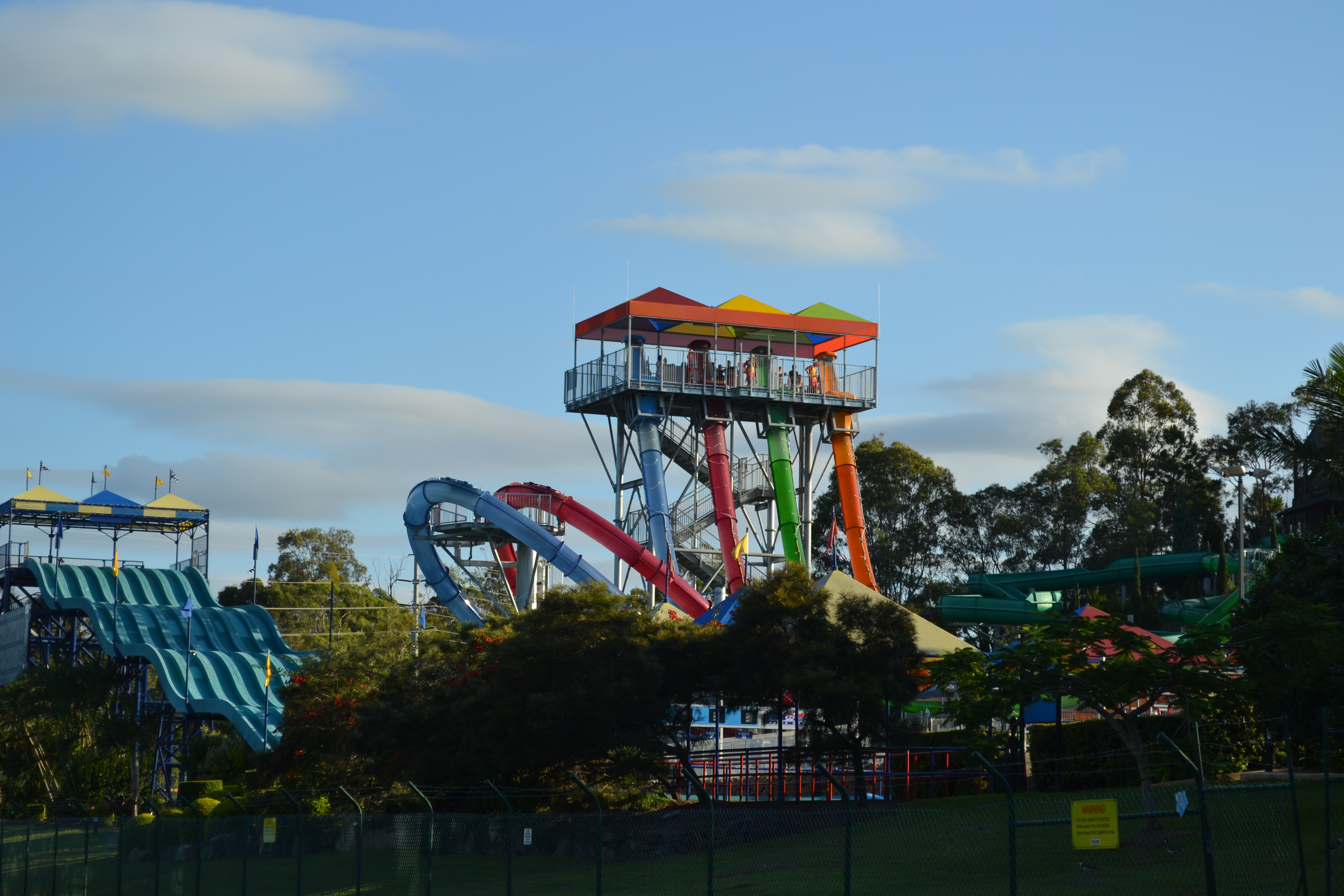
- AquaLoop at Wet'n'Wild Gold Coast

General statistics
- Type: Water slide
- Designer: WhiteWater West, AQUARENA
- Height: 17 m (56 ft)
- Drop: 16 m (52 ft)
- Length: 88.4 m (290 ft)
- Speed: 60 km/h (37 mph)
- Duration: 7 seconds
- G-force: 2.5
- Installations: 20+
- Restrictions: Riders must be at least 120 cm (3 ft 11 in) in height and weigh between 45 kg (99 lb) and 130 kg (290 lb) to ride.

An AquaLoop is a body water slide made by WhiteWater. Single riders are dropped down a near vertical slide and into an inclined loop. They are usually located in water parks.

== History ==
Canadian manufacturer WhiteWater developed the world's only looping water slide, known as the AquaLoop. There are nearly 70 AquaLoop installations around the world. The first installation was at Terme 3000 water park, Slovenia in 2008. Wet'n'Wild Gold Coast was the first to install more than one AquaLoop at a single location. The AquaLoop uses a trap-door to release riders down a 17-metre (56 ft) near-vertical descent at a speed of up to 80 kmh (40 mph). Riders experience -2.5 Gs in less than 2 seconds. The whole ride is over within 5 seconds.. As of 2026 the largest Aqua Loop is in Baton Rouge, Louisiana, USA, though once Aquarabia is completed, the ride Speedy Jamezales will take the title.

== Ride ==
An AquaLoop is launched from a 17-metre (56 ft) platform. A single rider is loaded into a launch chamber where they stand with their hands across their chest. After a countdown, a trapdoor opens and the rider immediately drops 16 metres (52 ft) inside a near vertical slide. The rider accelerates to 60 kilometres per hour (37 mph) in 2 seconds before entering the loop element. This element is a variation of the traditional vertical loop because it lies on an angle of approximately 45°. This variation of a loop is called an inclined loop. The 165-metre (541 ft) slide is over within 7 seconds.

== Installations ==
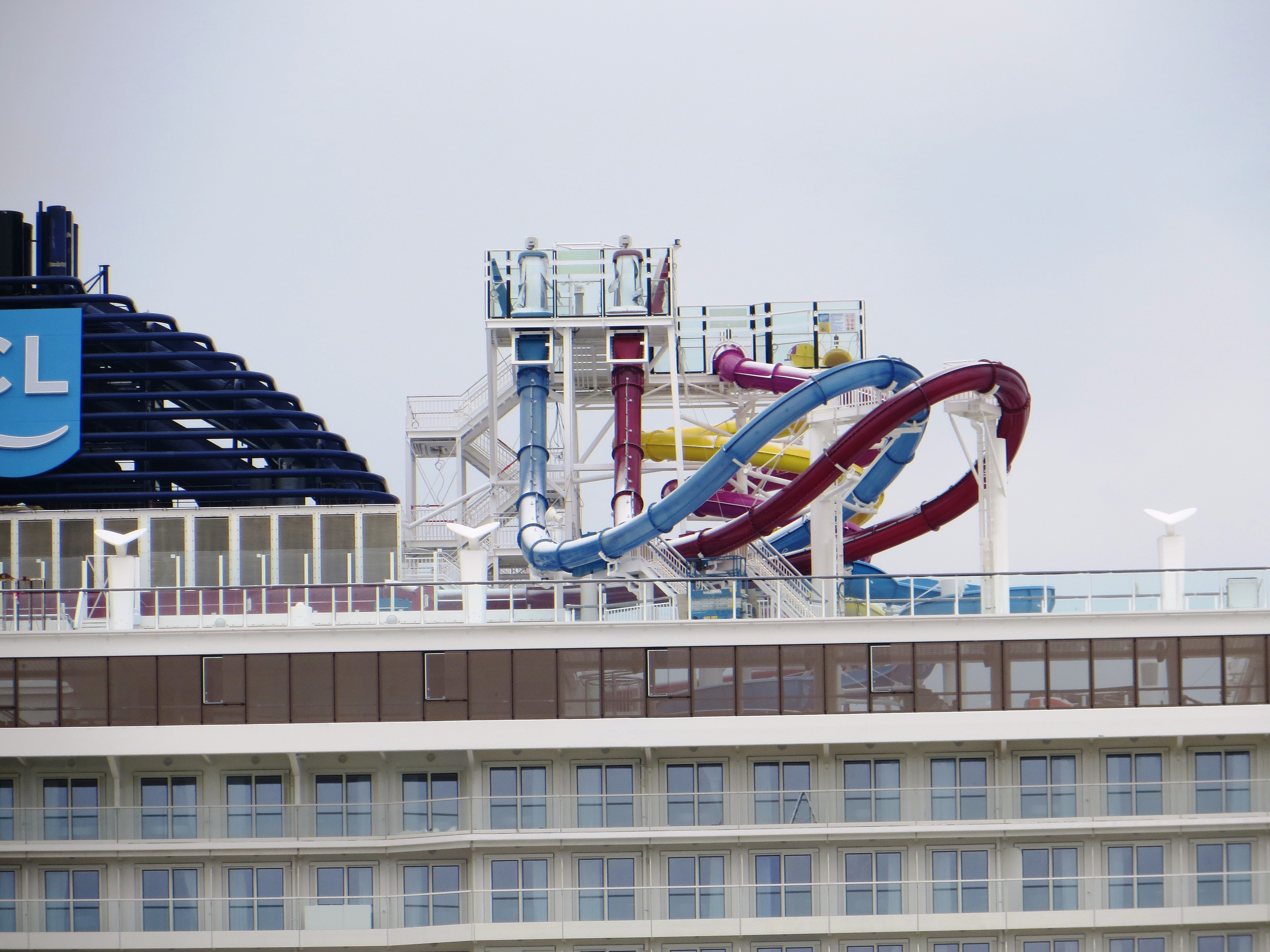
2 AquaLoop slides aboard Norwegian Breakaway.

Name	Water park	Location	Number of slides	Opened
AquaLoop	Akvamir Waterpark	Novosibirsk, Russia	1 slide	2017
AquaLoop	Aquasferra	Donetsk, Ukraine	1 slide	21 December 2012
AquaLoop	Anaklia Waterpark	(Georgia (country)) Ganarjiis Mukhuri, Georgia	1 slide	
AquaLoop	Adaland Aquapark	Kusadasi, Turkey	2 slides	
Looping Rockets	AquaPark Nessebar	Nessebar, Bulgaria	2 slides	2021
360Rush	Wet'n'Wild Sydney	Prospect, Australia	4 slides	12 December 2013
Climax Loop	Waterbom Park	Bali, Indonesia	1 slide	2010
Loopy Woopy	Aqua magica	Mumbai, India	1 slide	
Forest Loop	Amaziaa Waterpark	Surat, India	1 slide	
AquaLoop	Anandi Magic World	(Uttar Pradesh) Uttar Pradash, India	1 slide	
AquaLoop	Mana Bay Waterpark	Dhaka, Bangladesh	1 slide	4 March 2017
AquaLoop	Beijing Watercube Water Park	Beijing, China	1 slide	8 August 2010
AquaLoop	Paradise Island Waterpark	Chengdu, China	1 slide	
AquaLoop	Poseidon Waterworld	Songbei District, China	1 slide	
AquaLoop	Waterworld	Shanghai, China	1 slide	
AquaLoop	Maya Beach Water Park	Shanghai, Cina	4 slides	
AquaLoop	Dream Space Waterpark	Chongqing, China	2 slides	
AquaLoop	Yinji Kaifeng Waterworld	Kaifeng, China	2 slides	
AquaLoop	Hangzhou Bay Sunac	Hangzhou, China	1 slide	
AquaLoop	Hangzhou Paradise Waterpark	Hangzhou, China	1 slide	
AquaLoop	Nanjing Happy Magic Watercube	Nanjing, China	1 slide	
AquaLoop	Maya Happy Valley Water Park	Shenzhen, China	1 slide	
AquaLoop	Lishui Adventure Water World	Lishui, China	1 slide	
Mambo Loop	Blue Bayou and Dixie Landin	(Louisiana) Baton Rouge, United States	4 slides	2012
AquaLoop	Calypso Waterpark	(Ontario) Ottawa, Canada	2 slides	24 June 2011
AquaLoop	Caribbean Bay	(Gyeonggi Province) Yongin, South Korea	4 slides	17 June 2011
AquaDrop	Gimhae Lotte	(Saskatchewan) Gimhae, South Korea	4 slides	
AquaLoop	Spa World Waterpark	(Osaka Prefecture) Osaka, Japan	1 slide	
AquaLoop	El Rollo	(Morelos) Tlaquiltenango, Mexico	1 slide	2014
AquaLoop	Parque Acuático Ixtapan	(State of Mexico) Ixtapan De La Sal, Mexico	1 slide	2010
AquaLoop	Imbursa Waterpark	(Veracruz) Veracuz, Mexico	1 slide	
AquaLoop	Jungala Aqua Experience	(Tabasco) Playa Paraìso, Mexico	1 slide	
AquaLoop	Parco acquatico Xocomil	Retalhuleu, Guatemala	2 slides	
AquaLoop	Kawana Park	Caldas Novas, Brazil	2 slides	
La Chute	Jay Peak Resort	(Vermont) Jay, United States	1 slide	25 November 2011
AquaLoop	Jolly Roger Amusement Park	(Maryland) Ocean City, United States	1 slide	2012
AquaLoop	Terme 3000	Moravske Toplice, Slovenia	1 slide	May 2008
AquaLoop	Wet'n'Wild Gold Coast	(Queensland) Gold Coast, Australia	4 slides	18 September 2010
AquaLoop	Camping Le Pommier	(Auvergne-Rhône-Alpes) Villeneuve-de-Berg, France	1 slide	June 2013
AquaLoop	Aquamagis	(North Rhine-Westphalia) Plettenberg, Germany	1 slide	19 September 2008
AquaLoop	F3	(Baden-Württemberg) Fellbach, Germany	1 slide	
AquaLoop	Aqualand	(North Rhine-Westphalia) Köln, Germany	1 slide	2015
AdrenaLoop	Calypso	(Saarland) Saarbrücken, Germany	1 slide	
AquaLoop	Sportoase Groot Schijn	(Flanders) Antwerp, Belgium	1 slide	
AquaLoop	Escape Theme Park	Penang, Malasya	1 slide	
AquaLoop	Bangi Wonderland	(Selangor) Bangi, Malaysia	1 slide	2011
AquaLoop	Sunway Lagoon	Kwala Lumpur, Malaysia	1 slide	
Cyclone	World Waterpark	(Alberta) Edmonton, Canada	1 slide	12 August 2011
Lunar Loop	Wilderness Territory	Wisconsin Dells, United States	1 slide	June 2012
Scorpion's Tail	Noah's Ark Water Park	Wisconsin Dells, United States	1 slide	29 May 2010
Booster Loop	Aquaparc	(Valais) Le Bouveret, Switzerland	1 slide	8 May 2010
Maggia Loop	Lido Lorcano	(Ticino) Lorcano, Switzerland	1 slide	
Anaconda	Therme Amadé	(Salzburg (state)) Altenmarkt, Austria	1 slide	August 2011
AquaLoop	Vana Nava Hua Hin Water Jungle	(Chonburi province) Hua Hin, Thailand	1 slide	3 October 2014
Looping Rockets	Dino Waterpark	(Khon Kaen province) Khon Kaen, Thailand	2 slides	12 December 2012
AquaLoop	Andamanda Phuket	(Phuket province) Phuket, Thailand	2 slides	July 2012
AquaLoop	RamaYana Water Park	(Chonburi province) Pattaya, Thailand	1 slide	May 2016
Agravic Capsule	Tube Trek Waterpark	(Chiang Mai province) Chiang Mai, Thailand	1 slide	
Thunder Bolt	Splash World Waterpark	Khao Yai, Thailand	1 slide	
AquaLoop	Garden City Waterpark	Phnom Penh, Cambodia	1 slide	June 2014
Looping Rockets	AquaPlanet Waterpark	Pampanga, Philippines	2 Slides	
Wild Vortex	Wilderness Territory	(Tennessee) Sevierville, United States	1 slides	
The Guslinger	Typhoon Texas	(Texas) Houston, United States	1 slide	May 2016
LassoLoop	Epic Waters	(Texas) Grand Prairie, United States	1 slide	January 2018
AquaLoop	Water Park Tychy	(Silesia) Tychy, Poland	1 slide	30 April 2018
Liwa Loop	Yas Waterworld	(Emirate of Abu Dhabi) Abu Dhabi, United Arab Emirates	1 slide	2014
Poseidon's Revenge	Atlantis Aquaventure	(Emirate of Dubai) Dubai, United Arab Emirates	2 slides	May 2013
Leap Of Fate	Meryal waterpark	Doha, Qatar	2 slides	2 November 2013
AquaLoop	Makadi Palace Waterpark	(Red Sea Governorate) Makadi Bay, Egypt	1 slide	15 March 2018
MagicLoop	Sarm El Seik Waterpark	Sarm El Seik, Egypt	1 slide	
Hydro Plunge	Marassi Water World	(Matrouh Governorate) El Alamein, Egypt	1 slide	4 June 2023
AquaLoop	Valley Of Waves	(North West Province) Sun City, South Africa	1 slide	15 March 2018
AquaLoop	Wild Waves Waterpark	Port Edward, South Africa	1 slide	
Dragon Loop	Aquacentrum	(Budapest) Cegléd, Hungary	1 slide	4 March 2017
AquaLoop	Pirates Bay	(Texas) Baytown, United States	1 slide	
Wipeout	Hurricane Harbor Rockford	(Illinois) Cherry Valley, United States	1 slide	2017
AquaLoop	BH Hotel Mallorca	Mallorca, Spain	1 slide	
Free Fall	Norwegian Breakway	-	2 slides	30 April 2013
Free Fall	Norvegian Getaway	-	2 slides	2 November 2013
Free Fall	Norwegian Escape	-	2 slides	15 August 2015

60 Installations in the world as of 2026

== Similar water slides ==
The first known existence of a looping water slide was at Action Park in Vernon, USA, in the mid-1980s. Their water slide featured a vertical loop but was repeatedly closed due to safety concerns.

WhiteWater also developed the Flatline Loop which features a fast, downward-spiralling helix after a trapdoor release. The first installation was Triton's Twist at Funtown Splashtown. It was marketed as a looping water slide despite riders never actually experiencing an inversion.
