= Calypso Park =

Waterpark in Ontario, Canada

Calypso Theme Waterpark
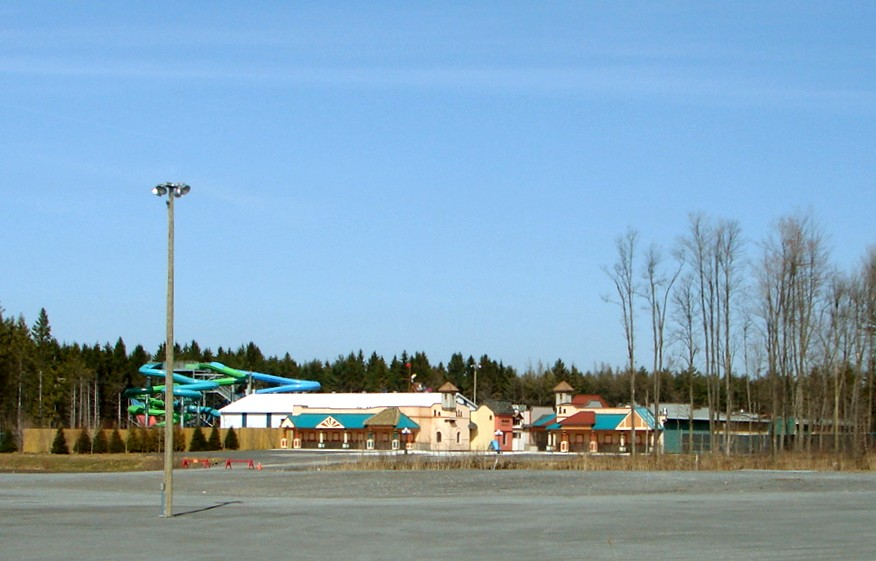
- Interactive map of Calypso Theme Waterpark
- Location: Limoges, Ontario, Canada
- Coordinates: 45.316667°N 75.216667°W
- Owner: EPR Properties
- Operated by: Premier Parks, LLC
- Opened: 7 June 2010
- Operating season: Mid June — September
- Area: 100 acres
- Pools: 3 pools
- Water slides: 35 water slides
- Children's areas: 2 children's areas
- Website: www.calypsopark.com

Calypso Theme Waterpark is a waterpark located in Limoges, Ontario, Canada, about 35 kilometres (22 mi) east of Ottawa. The park opened to the public on June 7, 2010.

The park features 35 waterslides, a wave pool (the largest in Canada) and two lazy rivers as well as a food outlets, shops, picnic areas, and a VIP area with private cabanas and suites.

The park can accommodate 22,000 visitors per day. On average, the park receives 400,000 visitors each season.

== Attractions ==
- Accelerators; 4 tube slides
  - Blue Rocket
  - Orange Bobsleigh
  - Stroboscope
  - Toboggan Alley
- Adrenaline; a speed slide.
- Aqualoops; 2 AquaLoop slides
- Blackhole; a tube slide.
- Boomerango; a half-pipe rafting slide.
- Calypso Palace; a wave pool.
- Canyon Rafting; a rafting slide.
- Family Twisters; 4 body slides
  - Aquashake
  - Mellow Yellow
  - Pigtail
  - Twist & Shout
- Fast Track; a multi-lane racer slide.
- Funtana; a splash pad.
- Jungle Challenge; an obstacle course.
- Jungle Run; a lazy canal.
- Kongo Expedition; a lazy river.
- Pirate's Aquaplay; a water play structure.
- Turbo Lab; 4 bowl slides.
  - Acid Test; tube slide
  - Frosty Drop; body slide
  - Hot Dip; body slide
  - Steamer; tube slide
- Turbulence; a tube slide.
- Vertigo; a speed slide.
- Zoo Lagoon; a children's play area with small slides.
- Zoomerang; a half-pipe tube slide.
- giant Cave

== Safety violations ==
During a one-month period in the summer of 2011, there were 10 injuries on Steamer, two of which resulted in spinal injuries. In all cases, the park failed to shut down the ride and did not report the incidents until the end of the season in September.

On June 19, 2012, employees on Orange Bobsleigh prematurely sent a group of riders down the slide resulting in a collision between two tubes causing a rider to be thrown out of the slide onto to the concrete below, knocking him unconscious.

In August 2012, an excess amount of chlorine was discharge into Calypso Palace sickening 20 people, 13 of whom had to be taken to hospital. Later that day, a power outage caused another discharge of chlorine into the pool, resulting in two more hospitalizations.

On April 13, 2015, Calypso Park was found guilty of six of the eleven charges it faced under Ontario's Technical Standards and Safety Act. They were fined $400,000 and forced to pay an additional $100,000 victim surcharge.
