= Ramayana Water Park =

Water park in Pattaya, Thailand

Ramayana Water Park; Thai: สวนน้ำรามายณะ
Coordinates: 12°45′04.59″N 100°57′45.66″E
Country	Thailand
Location	Na Chom Thian, Sattahip, Chonburi Province
Opened	May 5, 2016; 9 years ago
Operating season	Year-round
Operating hours	Daily from 10 am to 6 pm
Area	184.000 sqm
Pools	3 pools
Attractions	21
Website	ramayanawaterpark.com
Ramayana Water Park - Location
Ramayana Water Park - Plan
Ramayana Water Park - Overview

Ramayana Water Park (Thai: สวนน้ำรามายณะ) is a water park in Pattaya (Sattahip District, Chonburi province, Thailand), which is a 2-hour drive from Bangkok and 15 kilometers south of Pattaya City. It is one of the biggest water theme parks in Southeast Asia.

== History ==
Construction of Ramayana Water Park was started in 2011, and the ground breaking ceremony took place in November 2011. The 1.7 bn THB project was completed in May 2016, and the official opening took place on May 5, 2016.

== Park Overview ==
Ramayana, with an area of more than 18 ha (45 acres / 100 rai), is one of Asia’s biggest waterparks. Ramayana Water Park is located 20 km south of central Pattaya, close to the big Buddha image (Khao Chi Chan) and next to Silverlake Vineyard.

== Rides & Attractions ==
=== Water Attractions ===
Ramayana offers 21 waterslides, and some of them are unique, like two interacting slides (one of them having a diameter of 6 meters), a Masterblaster, named Aquacoaster, where water jets push riders up seven times, and which has been built as a double slide to allow two groups of riders simultaneously, and a unique river slide which ends in a lazy river. The 21 water slides include a variety of thrill slides (like a Freefall and AquaLoop, where riders embark in a launch capsule), competing slides (like the 4 Mat Racers or the 2 Aquacoaster), raft slides (Python and Aquaconda), a Boomerango, and some gentle alternatives like Serpentine, Spiral or River Slide. All slides are supplied by WhiteWater West, from Canada.

A 600-meter long lazy river, with integrated waves, bubbles and waterfalls, takes visitors on a ride around a natural hill. The park’s theming allows guests to explore an ancient city, with caves, sculptures and other remainders of “a long forgotten place”. This theming has been provided by ATECH International Thailand, which also contributed theming to other famous theme parks, including Disneyland Hong Kong and Ripley’s. Ramayana has a double wave pool with a beach 490 feet (150 m) wide, where one part of the pool can be used with tubes, and the other part without. In addition, there is a relax pool with integrated pool bar and a 60 meter long activity pool.

Ramayana offers two dedicated areas for children, which are also unique to this park. One play area, with a variation of spray attractions, is specifically designed for smaller children. The other one, with slides, water games and a climbing area, has been designed for slightly older kids. Children can also use all pools and the lazy river, as well as some other attractions out of the water, like caves or a maze.

Ramayana sources its water from its own nine wells, which provide drinking-quality water, and operates with a filtration system provided by Pentair and Wayfit. Ramayana employs more than 100 certified lifeguards.

=== Attractions on Dry Land ===
Ramayana also offers attractions on dry land, like a floating market built into the natural lake, a sculpture, a walk along the banks of a natural river, a sand play area, a maze (labyrinth), waterfalls, and encounters with real elephants. The park is located within a natural environment of surrounding lakes (neighbouring the Silver Lake), hills and greenery.

== Facilities ==
- The park also operates a restaurant offering 100 different dishes from around the world, a dedicated kids’s restaurant, and various coffee, ice-cream, and cocktail bars.
- More than 40 private cabanas are available for rent. The park offers lockers and towels for daily rent.
- The Shop provides necessary products, including swimwear, sun cream, towels, apparel, and souvenirs.
- Ramayana also offers Thai massage and spa services as well as free WiFi.
- All expenses within the park, like food or massages, can be made through a cashless payment system.
