= Wat Yansangwararam =

Buddhist temple in Chonburi province, Thailand

Coordinates: 12°47′20″N 100°57′29″E

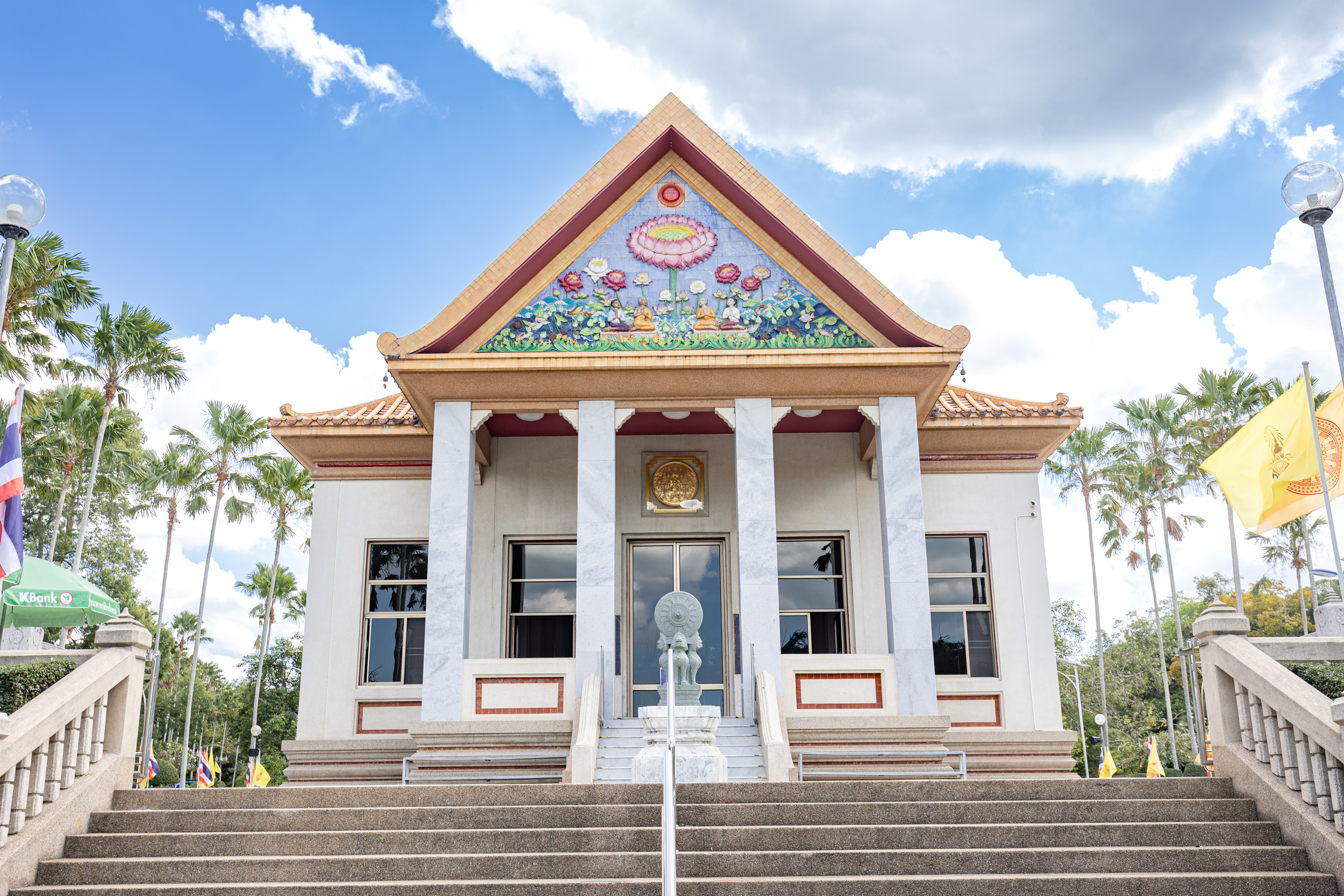
the ordination hall

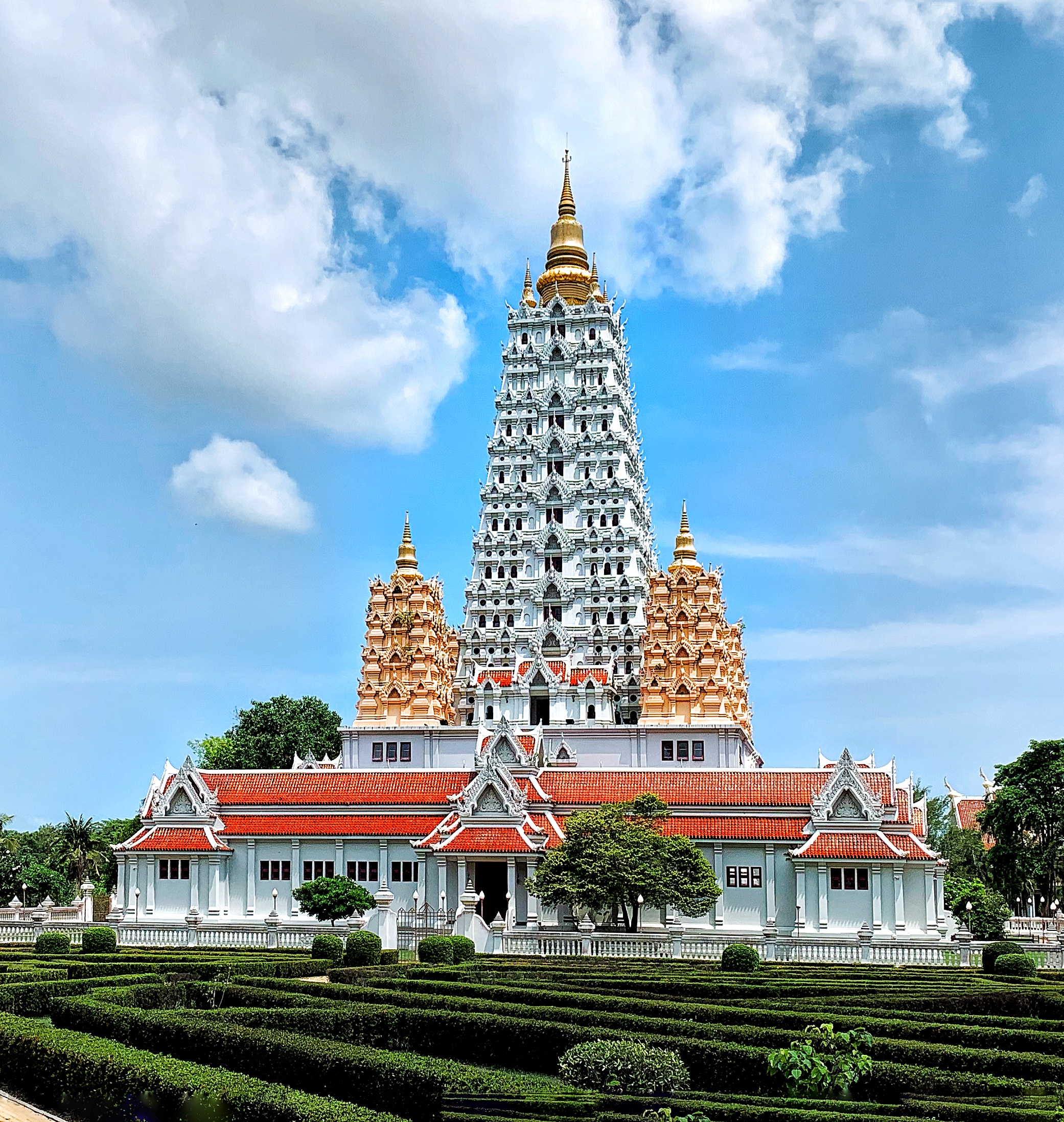
Wat Yansangwararam Temple was built in 1976 in honor of Supreme Patriarch Somdet Phra Yanasangworn.

Wat Yansangwararam Woramahawihan or Wat Yan (Thai: วัดญาณสังวรารามวรมหาวิหาร, RTGS: Wat Yannasangwararam, pronounced [wát jāːn.nā.sǎŋ.wá(ʔ).rāː.rāːm]) is located in Huai Yai in the Chonburi province of Thailand. It is a large Buddhist temple complex with gardens and lakes and has been under the patronage of Bhumibol Adulyadej Most of the buildings at Wat Yansangwararam were erected in honor of the Thai Royal Family. The temple is a replica of the Mahabodhi Temple in Bodh Gaya, Bihar, India.

International pavilions with ornaments around the adjacent lake and statues of revered monks, also of Bhumibol Adulyadej and his mother Srinagarindra, the Royal Grandmother, in the middle of parks offer the opportunity to walk for hours and study.

== History ==
The monastery Wat Yansangwararam, which only was built in 1976 by Vajirañāṇasaṃvara or Somdet Phra Nyanasamvara, the 19th Supreme Patriarch of the Thai Sangha for Dharma practice, especially for Samatha and Vipassana, is an important center of the Dhammayuttika Nikaya in Thailand. The project started up on initial 16.01 hectares (39.6 acres) donated by Dr. Kajorn and Khun Ying Nithiwadee Ontrakarn. Additional land in the area has been purchased by members of the building committee and devout supporters of Somdet Phra Nyanasamvara. The complex is divided into four zones: 1) - Buddhavas, the heart of the monastery. 2) Sanghavas, the living quarters for monks. 3) Karavas, the living quarters for Laity who come to practice Vipassanā and to observe Buddhist prescriptions. 4) Agricultural Education, Career Development Center, and Wildlife Care and Breeding Center.

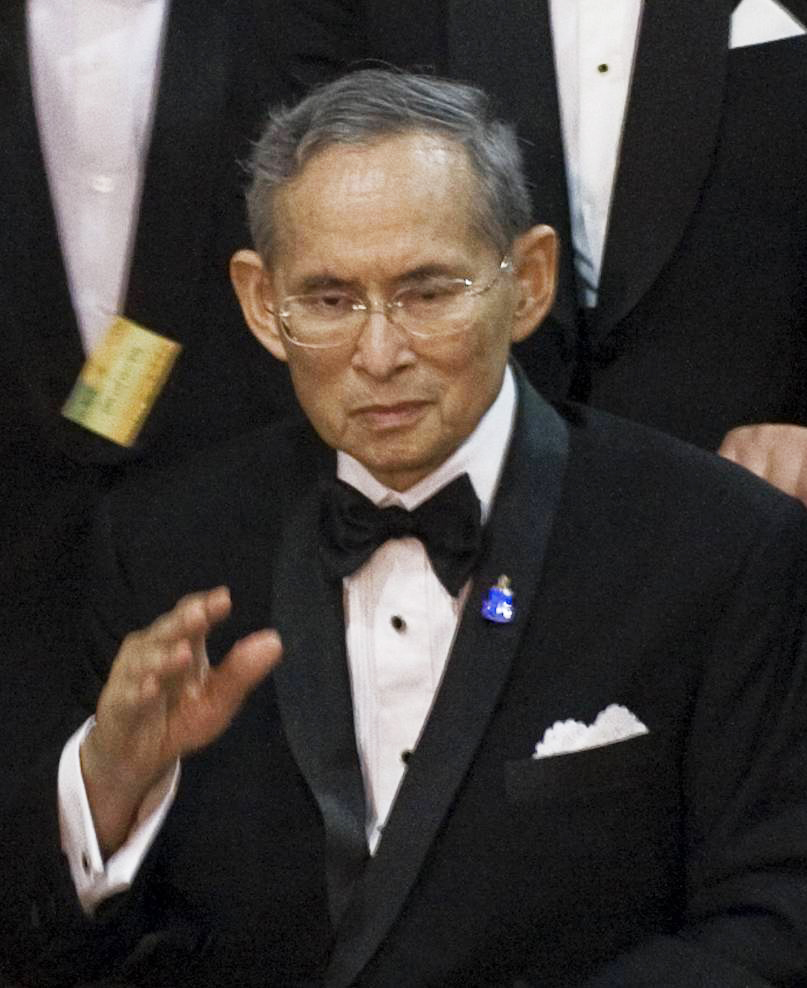
Bhumibol Adulyadej (Thai: ภูมิพลอดุลยเดช; RTGS: Phumiphon Adunyadet), also Rama IX in 2010, Patron of Wat Yansangwararam Woramahawihan

Wat Yansangwararam honors the memory Naresuan and Taksin but also Sirikit, Srinagarindra, Bhumibol Adulyadej, Mahidol Adulyadej, Sirindhorn, Prachadhipok and holy Buddhist monks.

== Buildings and monuments within the monastery ==
- Ariyakarn, designed by Khun Sanit and Khun Preeya Chimchom featuring twenty-two holy monks and two laity.
- Phra Borommathat Chedi Maha Chakkri Phiphat, built to honor past monarchs of the Chakri Dynasty.
- Tripiṭaka Ho Phra Trai Pidok or scripture hall, built in the traditional Thai practice of keeping the Buddhist Holy Scriptures.
- Ubosoth Hall Ordination hall, built as a Merit (Buddhism) making tribute to King Taksin the Great.
- The Replica Bodh Gaya Chedi ( Stupa), built to fulfill Somdet Phra Nyanasamvara's desire to have a commemorative structure constructed for the Lord Buddha in this monastery.
- Phra Maha Mondop Phuttabat PhorPorRor. SorKor., built as a homage to King Bhumibol Adulyadej and Queen Sirikit.
- Lord Virulhaka Maharaja Buddha Pandit Shrine
- Chiwaka Komaraphat Hermitage, inside the building are two Chiwaka Komaraphat Hermitages.
- Bell Tower
- Phra Pokklao Ariyakhet monument, built as a merit-making homage to King Prachadhipok, also Rama VII.
- MorWorKor SorThor Pavilion, built in tribute to Crown Prince Maha Vajiralongkorn and Princess Maha Chakri Sirindhorn.
- SorWor KorWor Pavilion, built in tribute to Her Royal Highness Princess Srinagarindra.
- Somdet Phra Srinagarindra Boromrajajonani Pavilion, built as a homage to Her Royal Highness Princess Srinagarindra, the Princess Mother, upon her 90th birth anniversary in 1990.
- Phra Sri Ariya Metteyya Vihara, featuring a Jaturamuk style hall with an Ariya Metteyya Buddha image.
- The Prince Father and Princess Mother Memorial Garden, two monuments of Mahidol Adulyadej and Princess Srinagarindra.
- Drum Tower

On the banks of the Klong Ban Amphoe water reservoir to the entrance of Wat Yansangwararam in 2021, there are eight pavilions that were built in honor of Bhumibol Adulyadej on the auspicious occasion of his 5th Cycle Birthday Anniversary, 'Lan Na', Pavilion Thailand, 'Isan', Pavilion Thailand, 'Jeen Nok' and 'Jeen Nai', Pavilion(s) Singapore, 'Japanese' Pavilion Japan, 'India' Pavilion India; and the 'Western', Pavilion French Switzerland.

== Physical geography ==
Wat Yansangwararam was built on 58.64 hectares (144.9 acres) in the southern region of Huai Yai, Bang Lamung District, Chonburi Province, 20 kilometres (12 mi) southeast of Pattaya City.

== Nearby places ==
- Nong Nooch Tropical Garden
- Viharnra Sien

== See also ==
- Mahabodhi Temple
- List of Buddhist temples in Thailand
