= Viharn Sien =

Museum and Chinese shrine in Thailand

Coordinates: 12°47′16.3″N 100°57′18.8″E

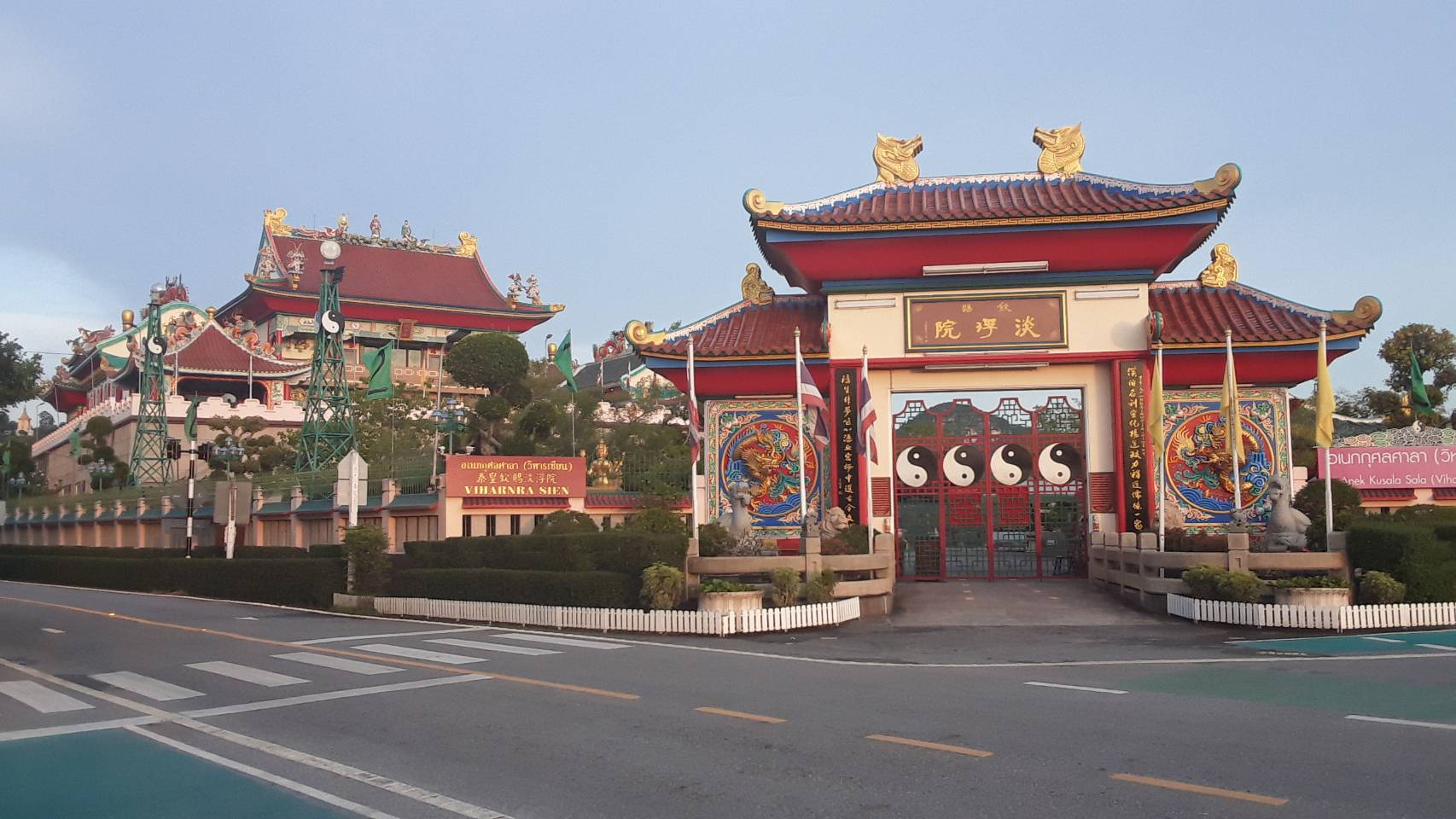
Entrance to Viharn Sien near Wat Yansangwararam in Huai Yai, Bang Lamung District.

Viharn Sien or Viharnra Sien, (Note: Thai: วิหารเซียน, RTGS: Wihan Sian, pronounced [wí.hǎːn sīan]) officially known as Anek Kusala Sala, (Note: Thai: อเนกกุศลศาลา, RTGS: Anek Kuson Sala, pronounced [a.nèːk.kù.sǒn.sǎ.lāː]) (Note: Dan Fu Yuan in Chinese (淡浮院)) is a museum and shrine designed in the style of a royal Chinese temple, located near Wat Yansangwararam in Pattaya, Chonburi. It was developed in 1987 by Thai-Chinese Sa-nga Kulkobkiat on land provided by king Bhumibol Adulyadej to create a building for an art collection gifted to the Chakri dynasty.

== Etymology and definition ==
Viharn, for Thai people commonly Vihan translates from Thai: วิหาร sanctuary or chapel. Sien translates from Thai: เซียน great master or deity. Viharn Sien often called Wihan Sien has evolved from Sanskrit Vihara or Vihāra, generally refers to a place of speech or monastery which has various rooms and/or living quarters for monks or nuns., see also Etymology and nomenclature. Anek Kuson Sala is the name given by King Bhumibol. Adulyadej.

== Buildings and exhibition ==
The main building at Viharn Sien is a three-story structure in the finest Chinese architecture style with decorative arts and exhibition spaces, built in 1987 to mark the 60th anniversary of the King. Near the entrance is a paved courtyard with a collection of bronze statues, trees, plants and flowers, as well as a monument of Sa-nga Kulkobkiat, who was born in Bangkok on October 18, 1925, but raised in China. Among the many drums, bells, Buddha statues, and other cultural artifacts are replicas of the Terracotta Army archaeological site. The main building houses a significant collection of bronze statues, Shaolin monks, jade carvings, paintings and pieces of Thai and Chinese art, and cultural relics on three levels.

== Nearby places ==
- Wat Yansangwararam
- Nong Nooch Tropical Garden
