= Aquapark Nessebar =

Water park in Nesebar city, Bulgaria

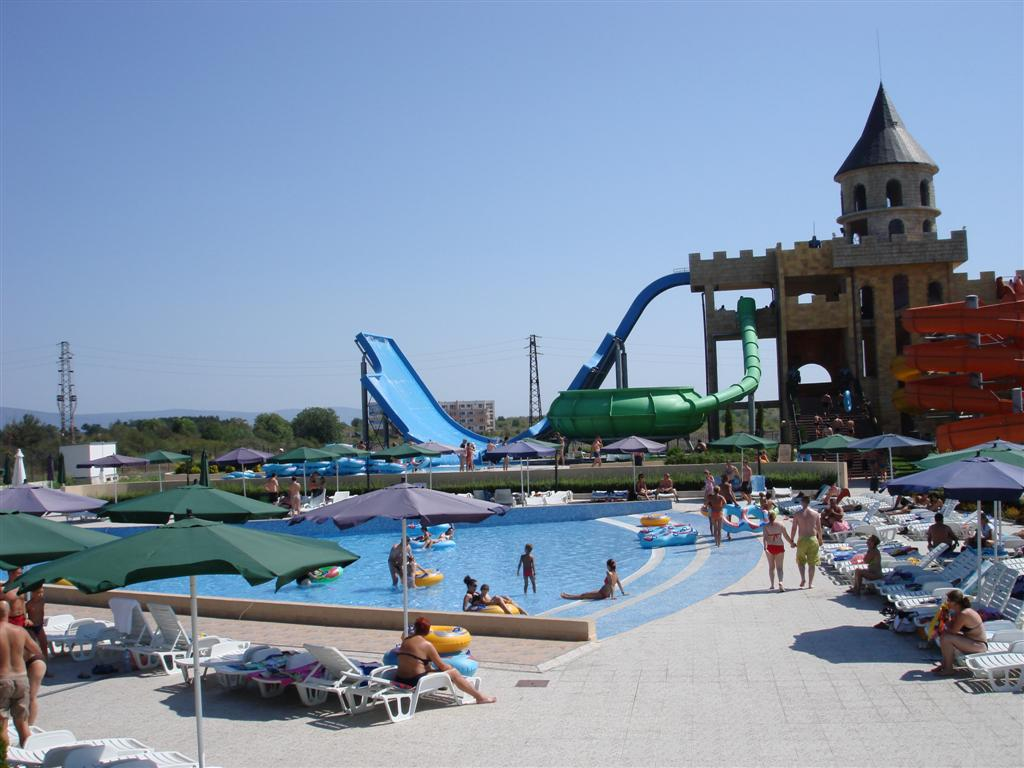
- Aquapark

- Location within Bulgaria
- Former names: Aqua Paradise Water Park

General information
- Location: Nesebar, Bulgaria
- Coordinates: 42.6562608°N 27.6821351°E

Website
- aquaparknessebar.bg/en/

Aquapark Nessebar (Аквапарк Несебър) is an aquapark in the historic Nesebar City in Sunny Beach, Bulgaria.

The aquapark was founded in 2006, and covers an area of 55,000 square meters.

As of June 2023, there are 60 attractions and 38 water slides in the aquapark. The waterpark is not open all year round. At the start of the season, it is only open exclusively for guests of the hotel. In the end of May, it usually opens to the public (although some attractions may not be open right away).

== See also ==
- List of hotels in Bulgaria
