= Silverlake Vineyard =

Thai winery in Chonburi

Coordinates: 12°45′37″N 100°57′51″E

Logo

Silverlake Vineyard is a Thai winery located at the foot of Khao Chi Chan. Founded in 2002 by Surachai Tangjaitrong and Supansa Nuangpirom, it is a tourist attraction of Thailand.

Varieties produced include Shiraz, Chenin Blanc, Chardonnay, Sauvignon Blanc, Rose and Cabernet Sauvignon.
