= Nong Nooch Tropical Garden =

Botanical garden in Chonburi Province, Thailand

Nong Nooch Tropical Botanical Garden
- สวนนงนุชพัทยา
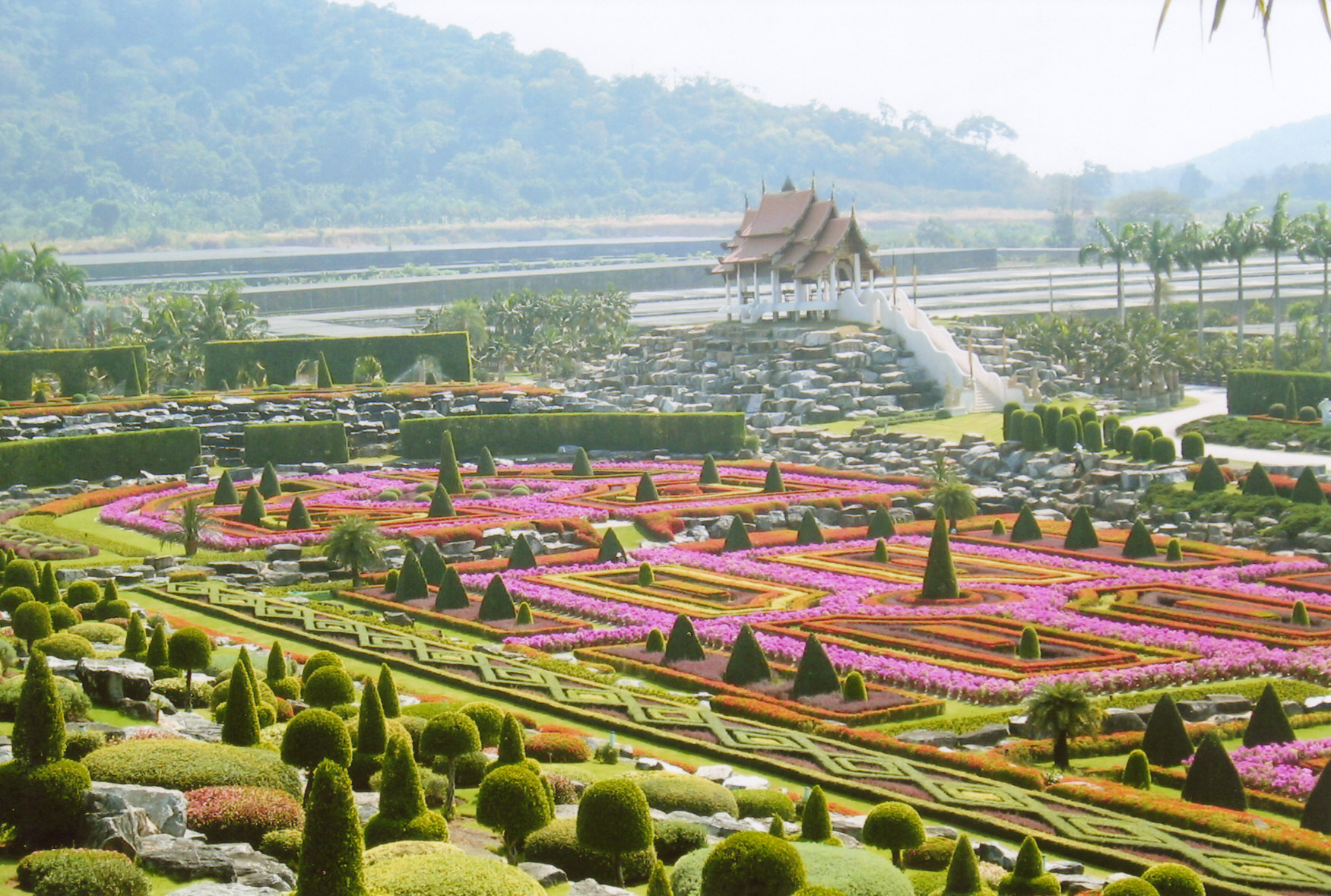
- The French Garden
- Interactive map of Nong Nooch Tropical Botanical Garden
- Type: Botanical garden
- Location: Chonburi province, Thailand
- Nearest city: Pattaya
- Coordinates: 12°45′53″N 100°56′09″E
- Area: 2.4 km^{2} (0.93 sq mi)
- Created: 1980
- Founder: Nongnooch Tansacha
- Designer: Nongnooch Tansacha; Kampon Tansacha
- Etymology: Named after Nongnooch Tansacha
- Camp sites: Nong Nooch Nature Camp
- Website: https://www.nongnoochtropicalgarden.com/

Nong Nooch Tropical Botanical Garden (Thai: สวนนงนุชพัทยา), also called Nongnooch Pattaya Garden, is a 500-acre (2.0 km^{2}) botanical garden and tourist attraction in Chonburi Province, Thailand. Located on Sukhumvit road, it can be reached via bus, taxi or private land transportation. It is also a major scientific center dedicated to cycads, with its own Cycad Gene Bank.

Nong Nooch is the largest botanical garden in Southeast Asia.

== History ==
In 1954, Pisit and Nongnooch Tansacha purchased 1,500 rai of land on the garden's modern location. The couple had originally planned to use the land as a fruit location for several foreign and native fruits, including coconuts, mangoes, and oranges. However, Nongnooch decided to turn the land into a tropical garden after being inspired by a trip abroad.

The garden opened to the public in 1980, and in 1983 the garden's management was handed to Nongnooch's son, Kampon.

From 1996 to 1997, Kampon expanded the garden's lakes and the soil dug up was placed in a valley which was initially used as a sunflower field. Eventually, Kampon decided to turn the area in the French Gardens based on the Gardens of Versailles, which opened in 1998.

In 2016, the park began construction on Dinosaur Valley, which opened in 2017.

On 17 May 2018, the ambassador of Bhutan to Thailand, Che Wang Choel Dorje, gifted the garden nine prayer flags of Bhutan in a Montra flag ceremony.

In 2019, controversy ensued when a tourist uploaded images that suggested mistreatment of the elephants in their care, an accusation the Botanical Gardens has disputed.

== Areas ==
=== Cactus Garden ===
Located near the main entrance, the Cactus Garden is a tall glasshouse area that houses several species of cactus, including:

- Echinocactus grusonii (Mexican golden barrel cactus)
- Pachycereus pringlei
- Melocactus sergipensis
- Echinopsis
- Lobivia

=== Garden in the Sky ===
Designed by Kampon Tansacha, the Garden in the Sky displays several plants, including ferns, cacti, bromeliad, orchids, agave, cycads, croton, bonsai and aglaonema, on an elevated level from the ground, with some plants being hanged from the roof. The area consists of two levels, a LED system to assist the plants in photosynthesis, and a spray system to water the plants.

The garden can be accessed by an elevator or the skywalk, which also travels across most of the garden and is 6 km long.

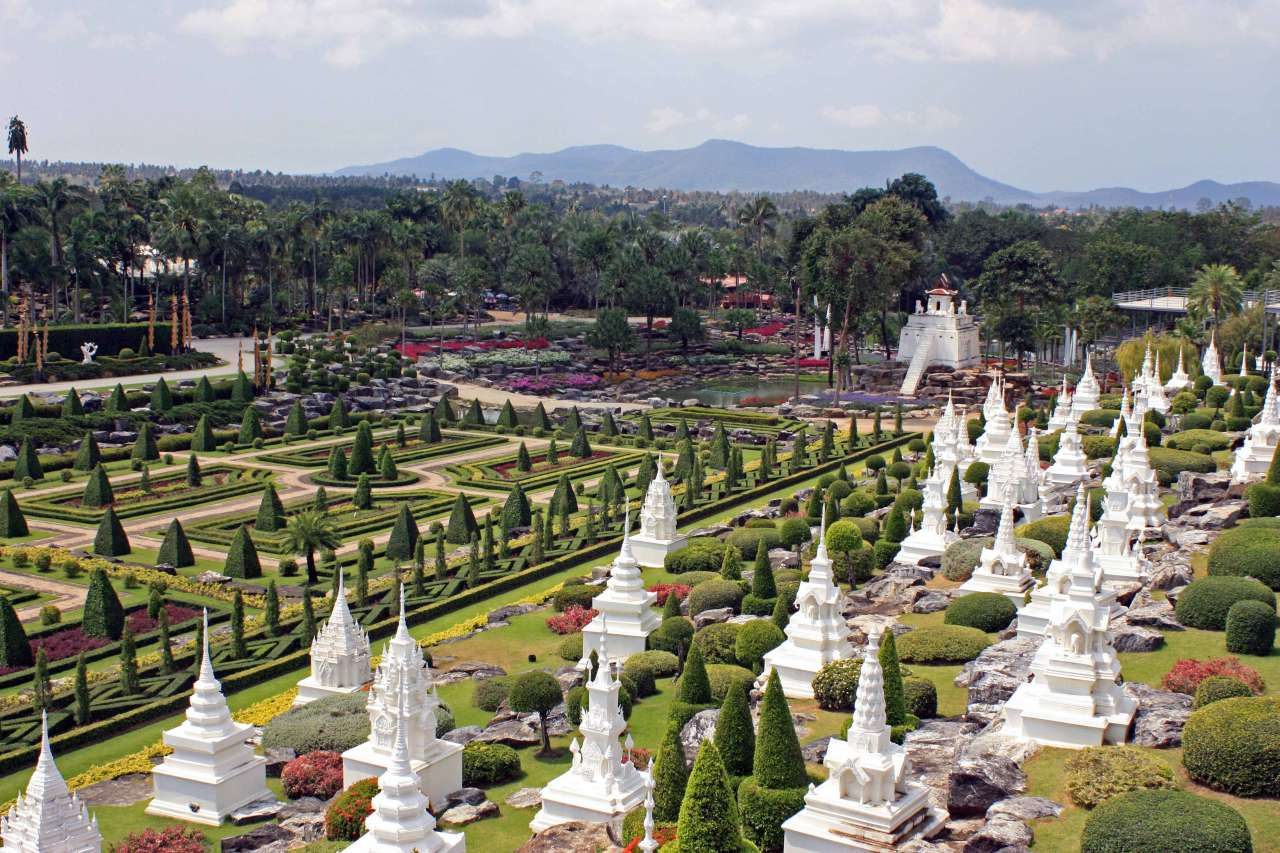
French Garden 1 in 2010

=== French Gardens ===
Nong Nooch consists of two French Gardens, which are inspiried by the Gardens of Versailles and opened in 1998, with the idea originating from 1996.

In between the French Garden 1 and Thai pavilion are located the nine prayer flags of Bhutan, which were gifted to the garden by the Embassy of Bhutan in 2018. The flags are replaced every 6 months due them fading, and a ceremony is held everytime the new flags are handed to Nong Nooch by the Bhutanese embassy.

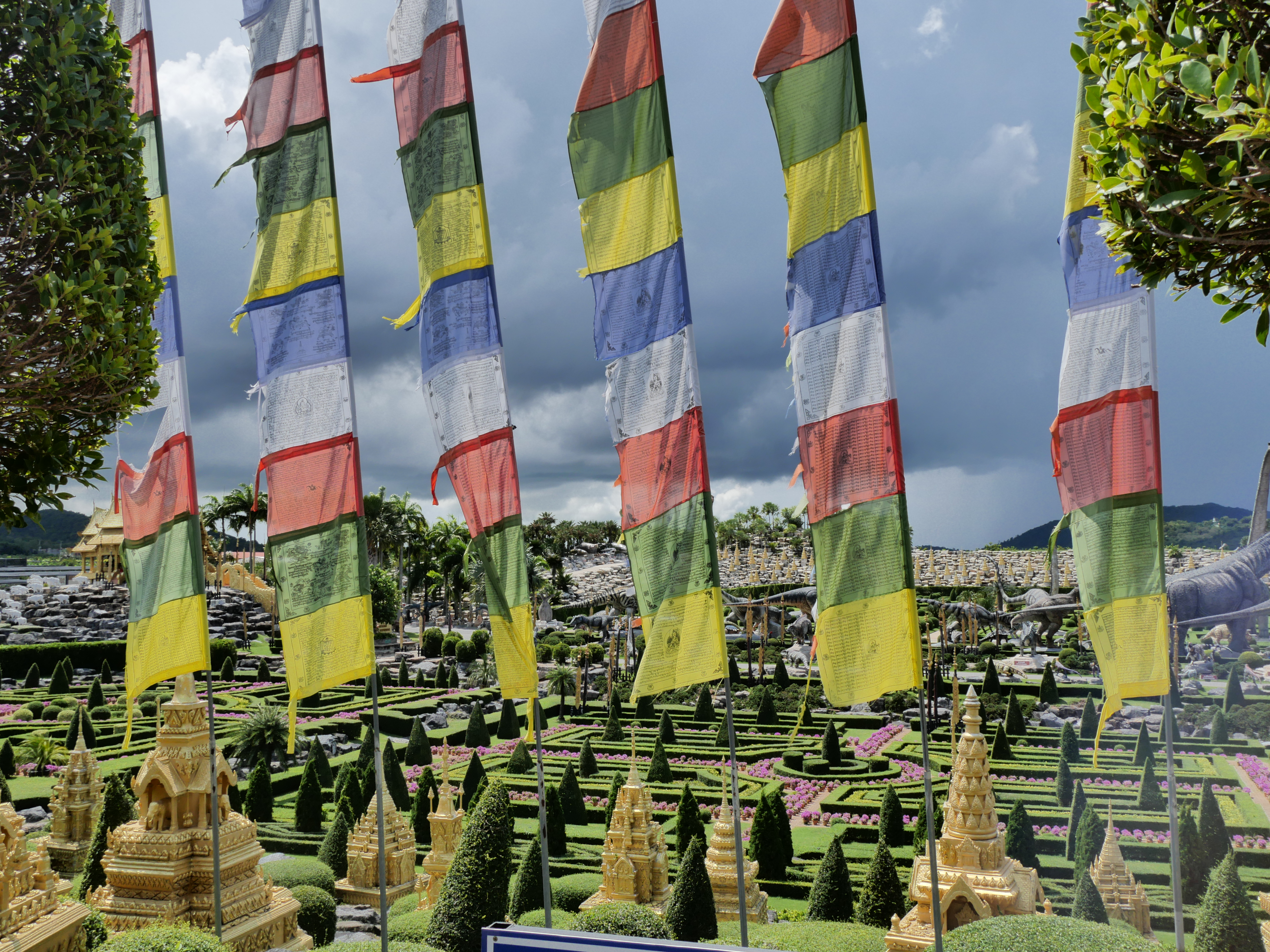
Six of the nine prayer flags of Bhutan, 2023

=== Dinosaur Valley ===
In 2016, Kampon Tansacha ordered the molding of the first dinosaur model in the garden, a Triceratops, which was then placed in the Cactus Garden, whose popularity among tourists caused the garden to construct a section dedicated to dinosaur models. Construction on the section began in 2016 and opened on 10 April 2017. More than 180 replicas of different dinosaur genera.

Dinosaur Valley is located around the French Garden 2.

=== Italian Garden ===
The Italian Garden was the first garden created by Nongnooch and contains marble statues from Italy.

=== Stonehenge Garden ===
The garden contains a replica of Stonehenge and was built in 2000. The stones used in the replica were purchased by Kampon from Prachinburi province and includes an engravement dedicated to Nongnooch.

== Activities ==
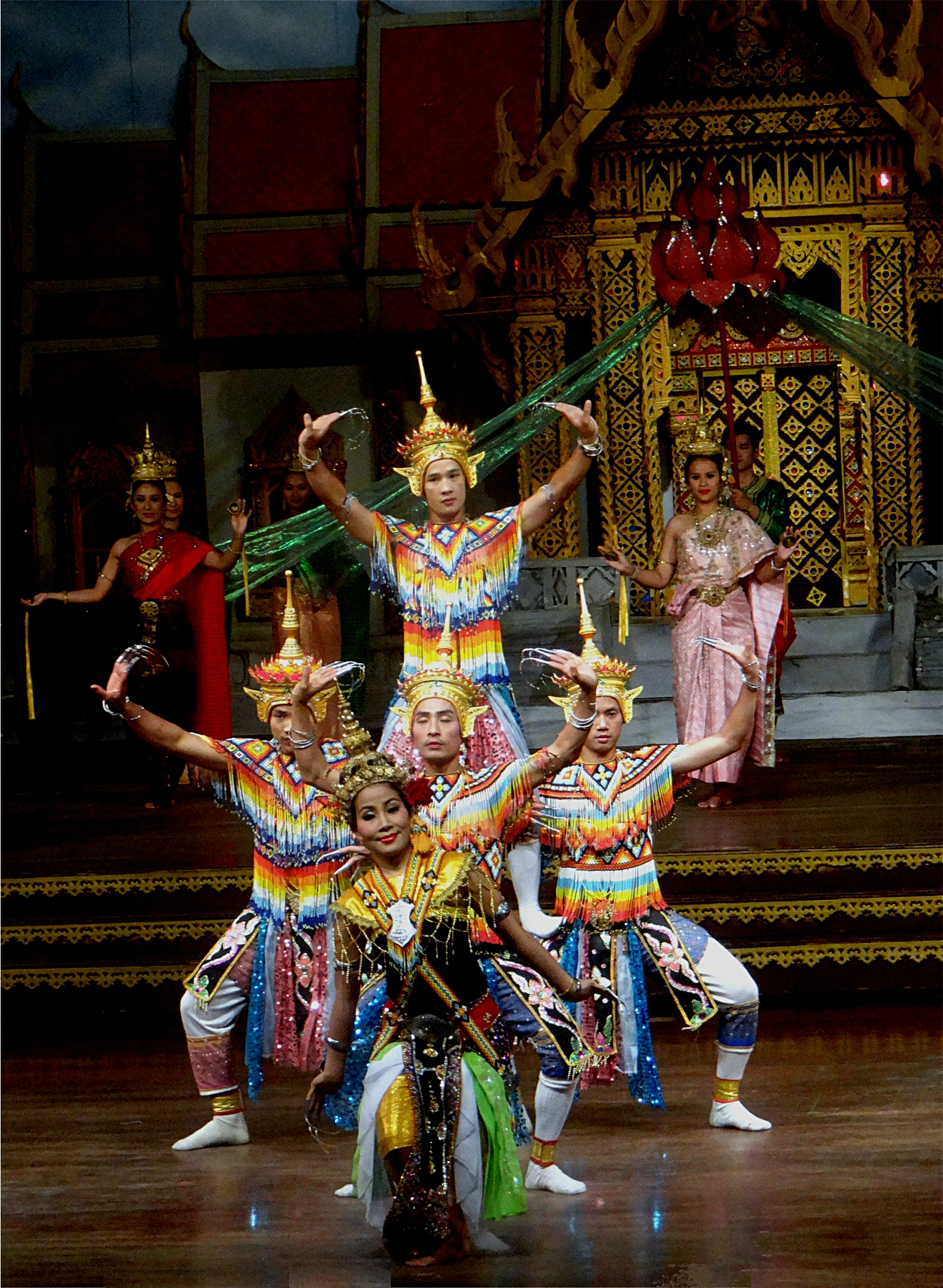
Thai cultural show

In addition to examining the wildlife, tourists experience religious ceremonies, martial arts demonstrations, massages, and elephant shows. There are also two restaurants, a small zoo and a hotel with a swimming pool and Thai style rental houses on the grounds.

To the garden's east are two lakes which contains Arapaimas gigas from the Amazon river. Tourists can feed the Arapaimas gigas.

=== Accommodations ===
Nongnooch contains the Nongnooch Pattaya Garden and Resort, which contains one resort and three villas and are located besides the lake containing the Arapaimas gigas.

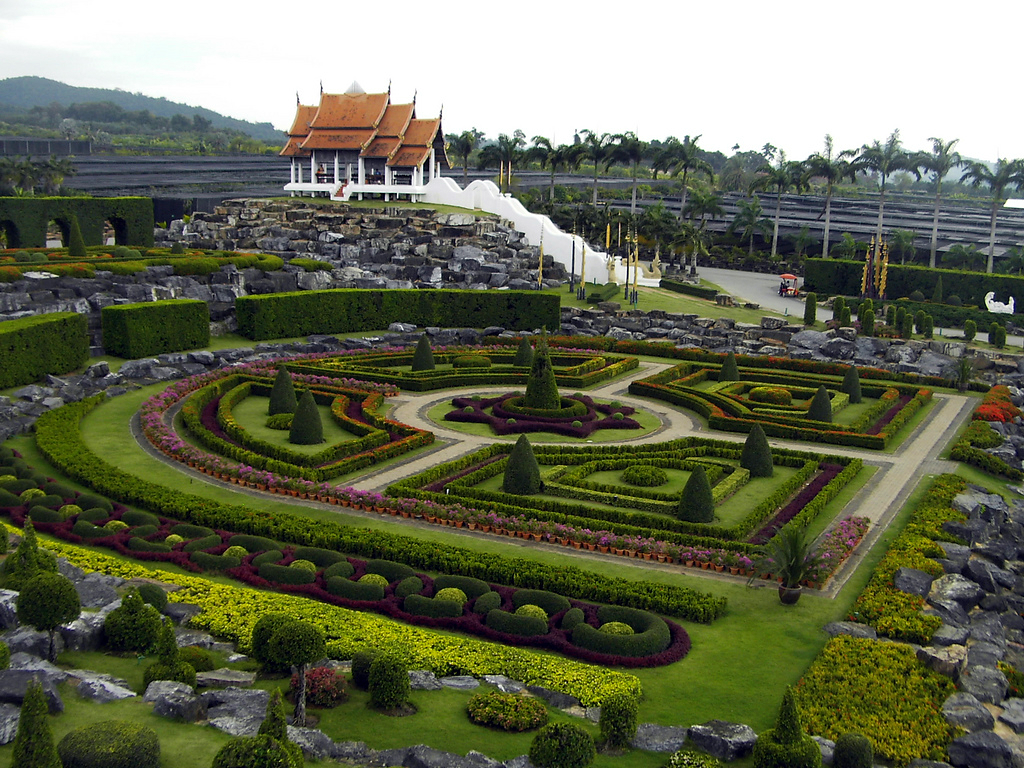
Several plants in a garden

== Plants ==
=== Cycads ===
The garden focus on Southeast Asian, Tropical American and Central Africa species of Cycads, but a collection of almost every species can also been seen here. In connection with conservation agencies the garden's cycad collections serve as an important ex situ conservation site for this endangered and ancient plant group. On-going and continuing research at the garden concerning taxonomy and horticultural use has increased the knowledge about this plant group worldwide.

The Cycad genebank is managed by Anders J. Lindstrom, an expert in cycads.

=== Palms ===
- Rhapis palms

=== Succulents ===
- Blue Agave
- Madagascar Euphorbia
- Pachypodium

=== Zingiberales ===
- Heliconia
- Ginger
- Torch Ginger
- Alpinia

=== Other notable plant groups ===
- Bougainvillea
- Hoya
- Bromeliads
- Marantaceae
- Passiflora
- Plumeria
- New Caledonian Plants

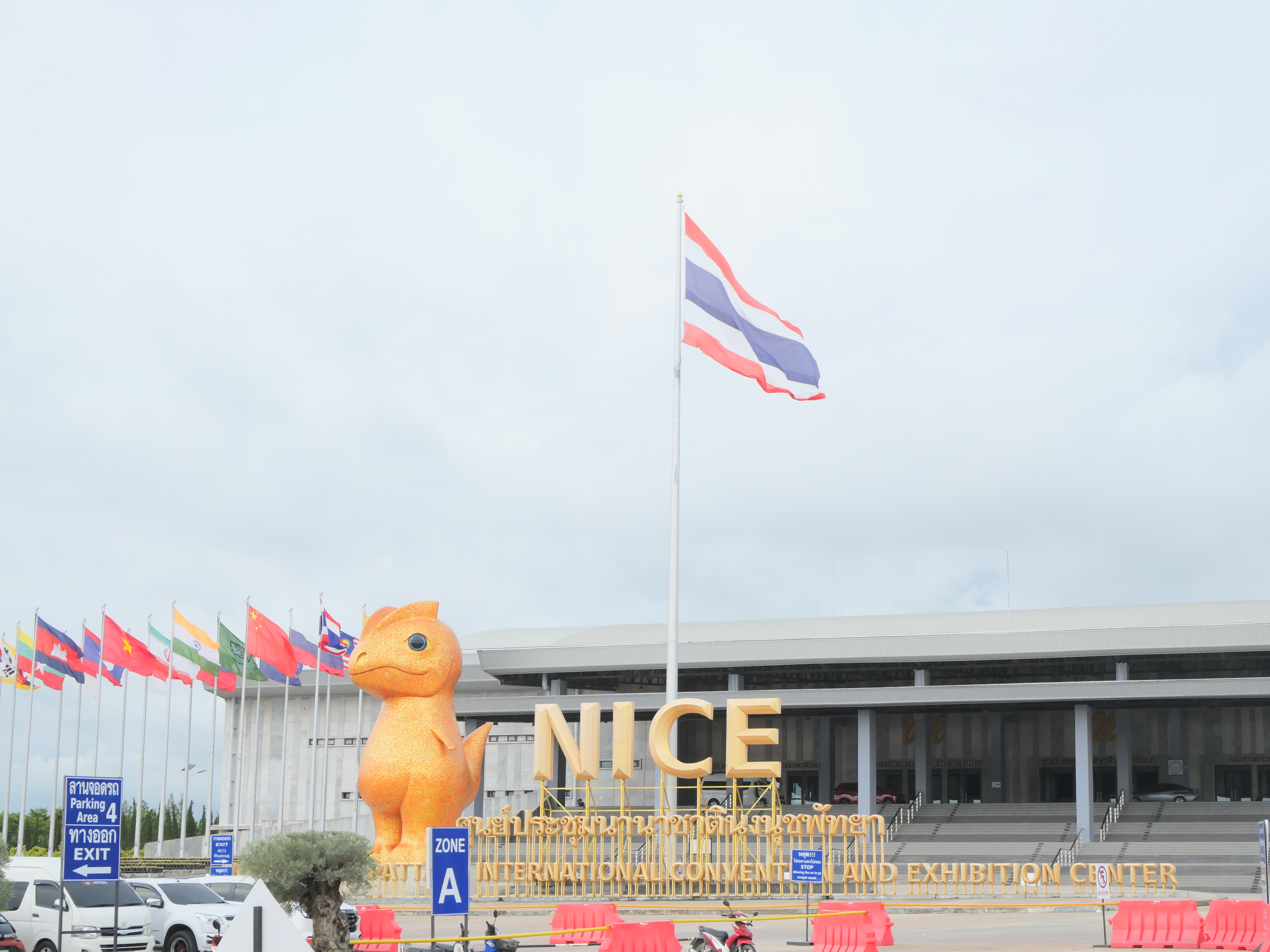
NICE as viewed from the carpark shared by both NICE and the garden, 2023

== Pricing ==
A two-tiered pricing system is employed with different rates for Thai nationals versus non-Thais.

Currently a single admission ticket for an adult Thai national costs THB 300, while for an adult non-Thai the price is THB 600.

== NICE ==
Nongnooch Pattaya International Convention and Exhibition (Thai: ศูนย์ประชุมและแสดงสินค้านานาชาตินงนุชพัทยา; often abbreviated as NICE) is a 5,610 m² convention center located besides the main garden which can hold up to 12,000 people inside. The venue's audio system was developed by Mahajak Development.

MiRA - an event about automation, robotics, and industry within the Eastern Economic corridor - was held at NICE from 6 to 8 September 2023, and is set to also be held at NICE in both 2024 and 2025.

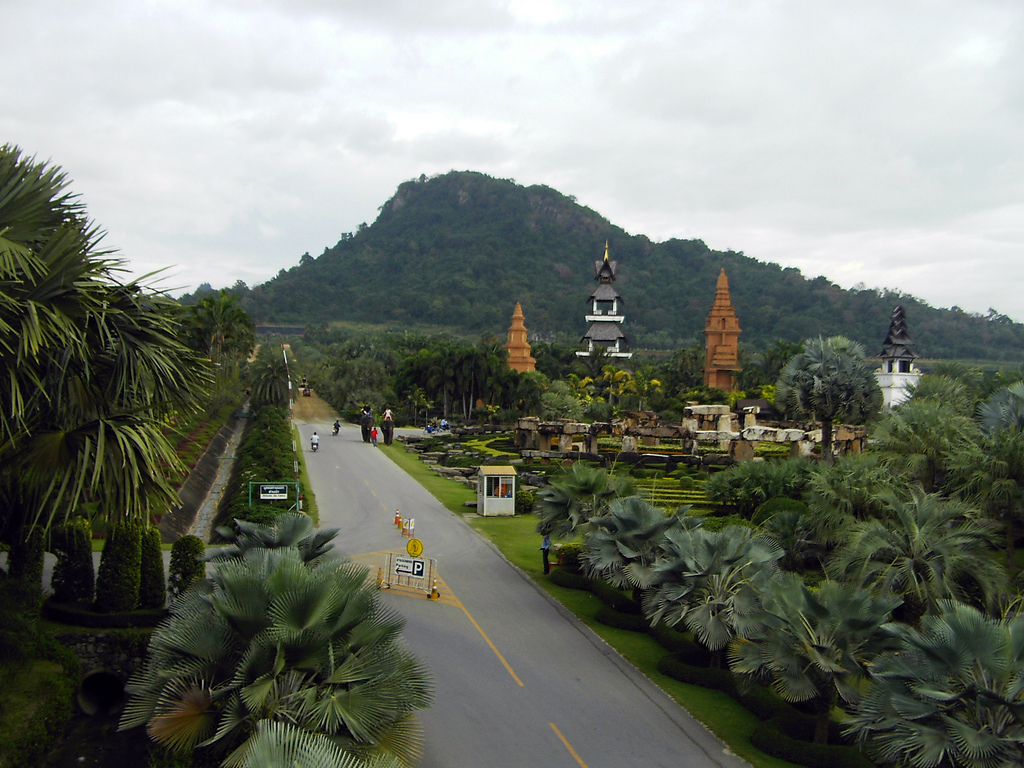
Nong Nooch Tropical Botanical Garden

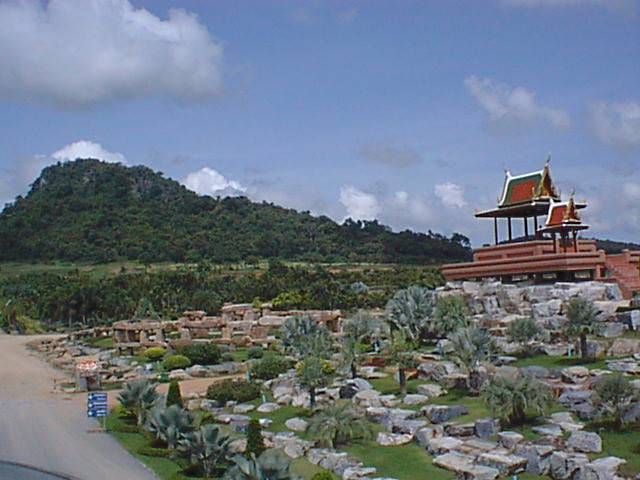
Nong Nooch Tropical Botanical Garden

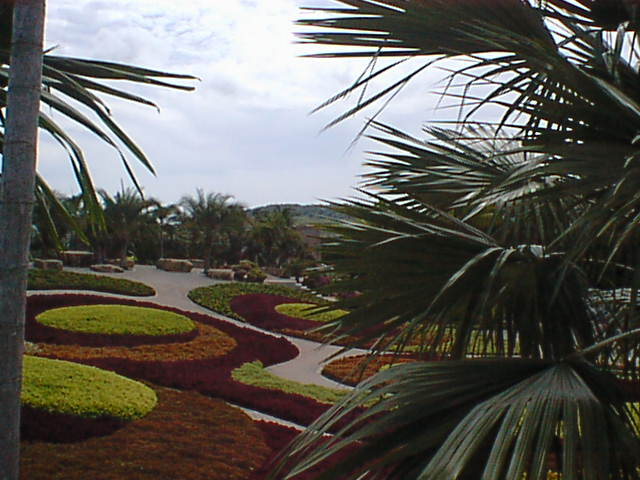
Decorative Landscaping at Nong Nooch Tropical Botanical Garden
