= Adventure Bay =

Adventure Bay may refer to:

- Adventure Bay, Tasmania
- Adventure Bay (South Georgia)
- Adventure Bay, the fictional main setting of Paw Patrol
- Fame City Waterworks, later Adventure Bay, a defunct water park in Houston, Texas, US
