= Water slide =

Type of slide designed for recreational use in swimming pools or water parks

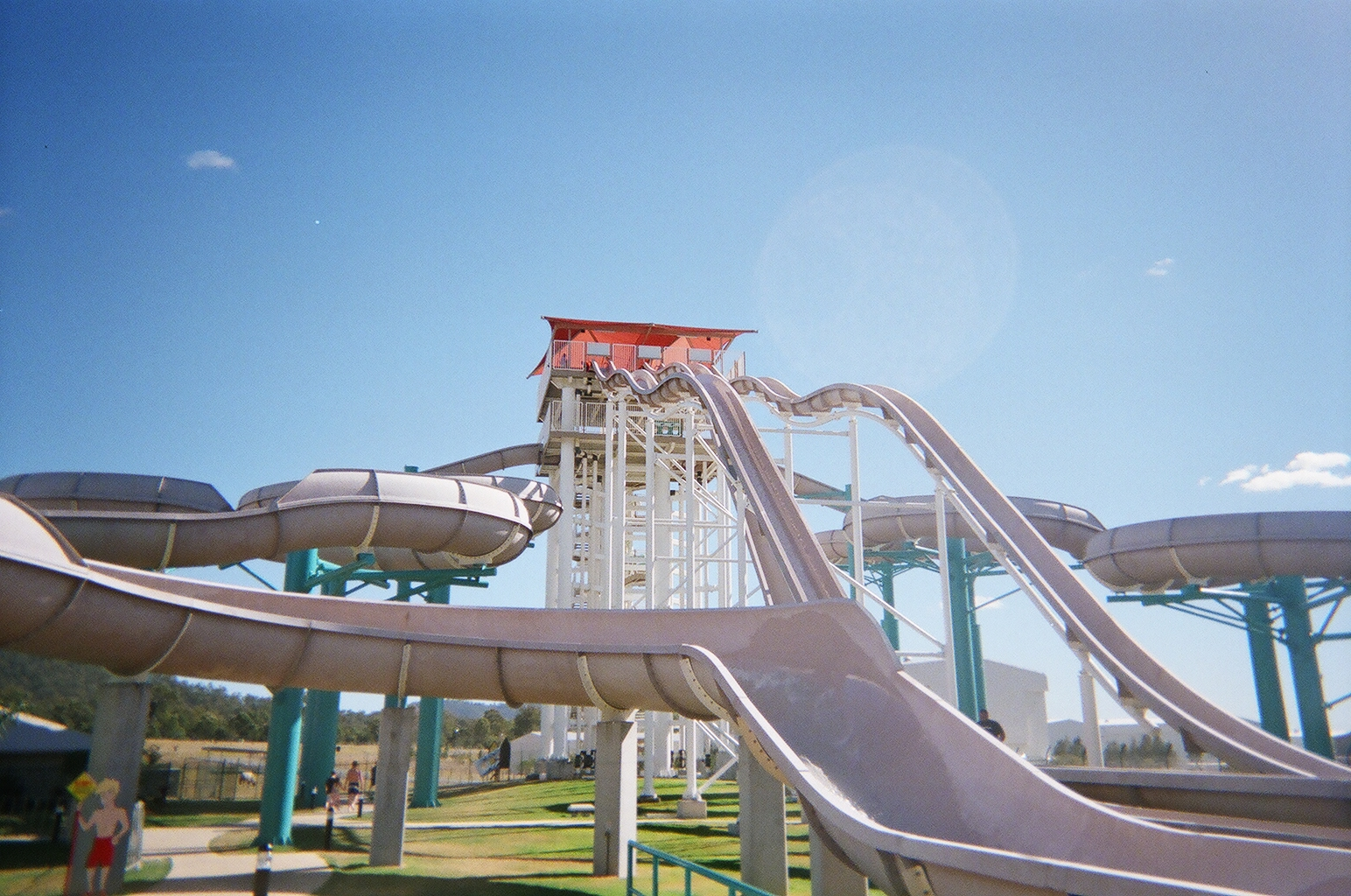
A collection of water slides at Wet'n'Wild Gold Coast on the Gold Coast, Australia. The outer two are traditional inline tube slides while the centre three are body speed slides.

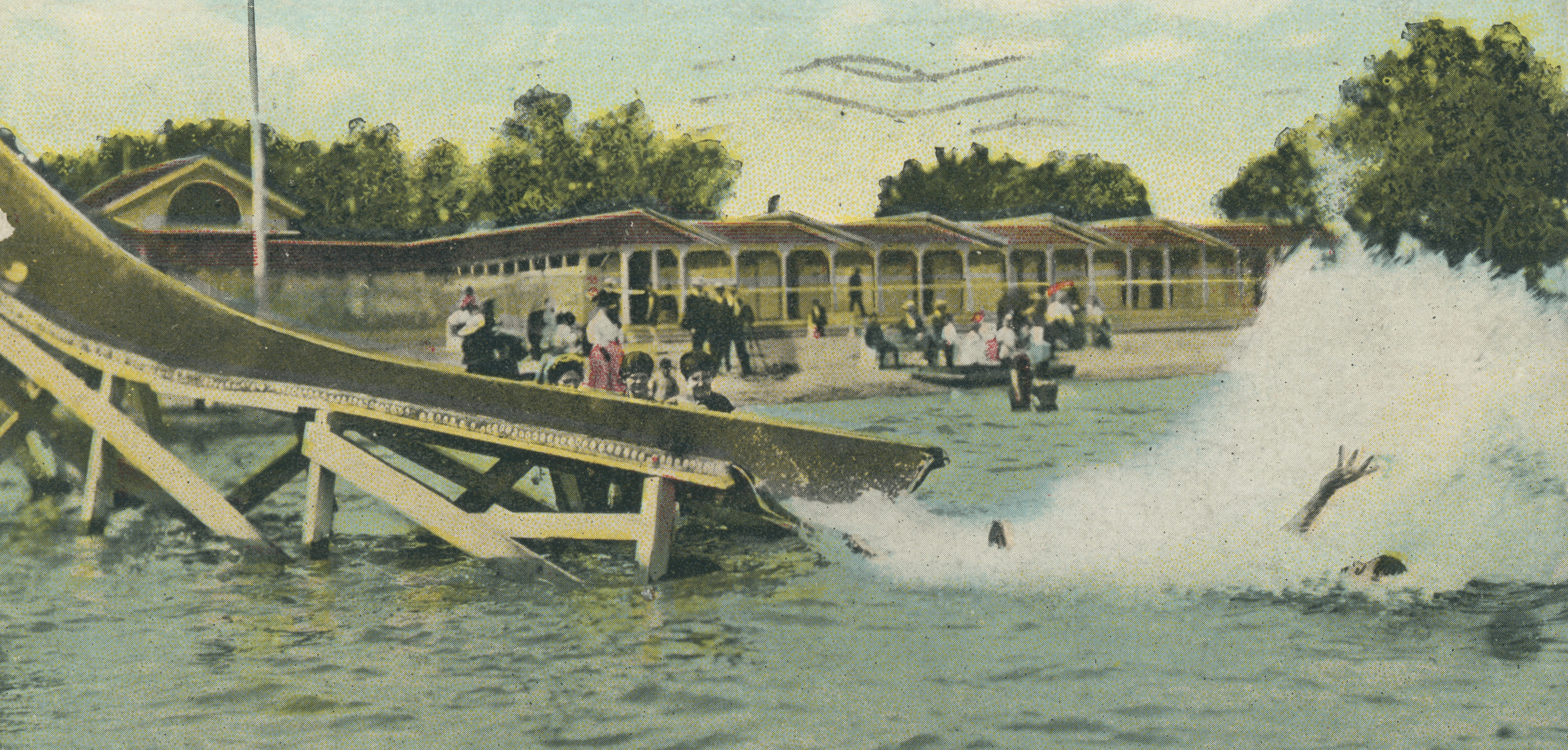
Water slide at Toledo Beach, Michigan, 1911

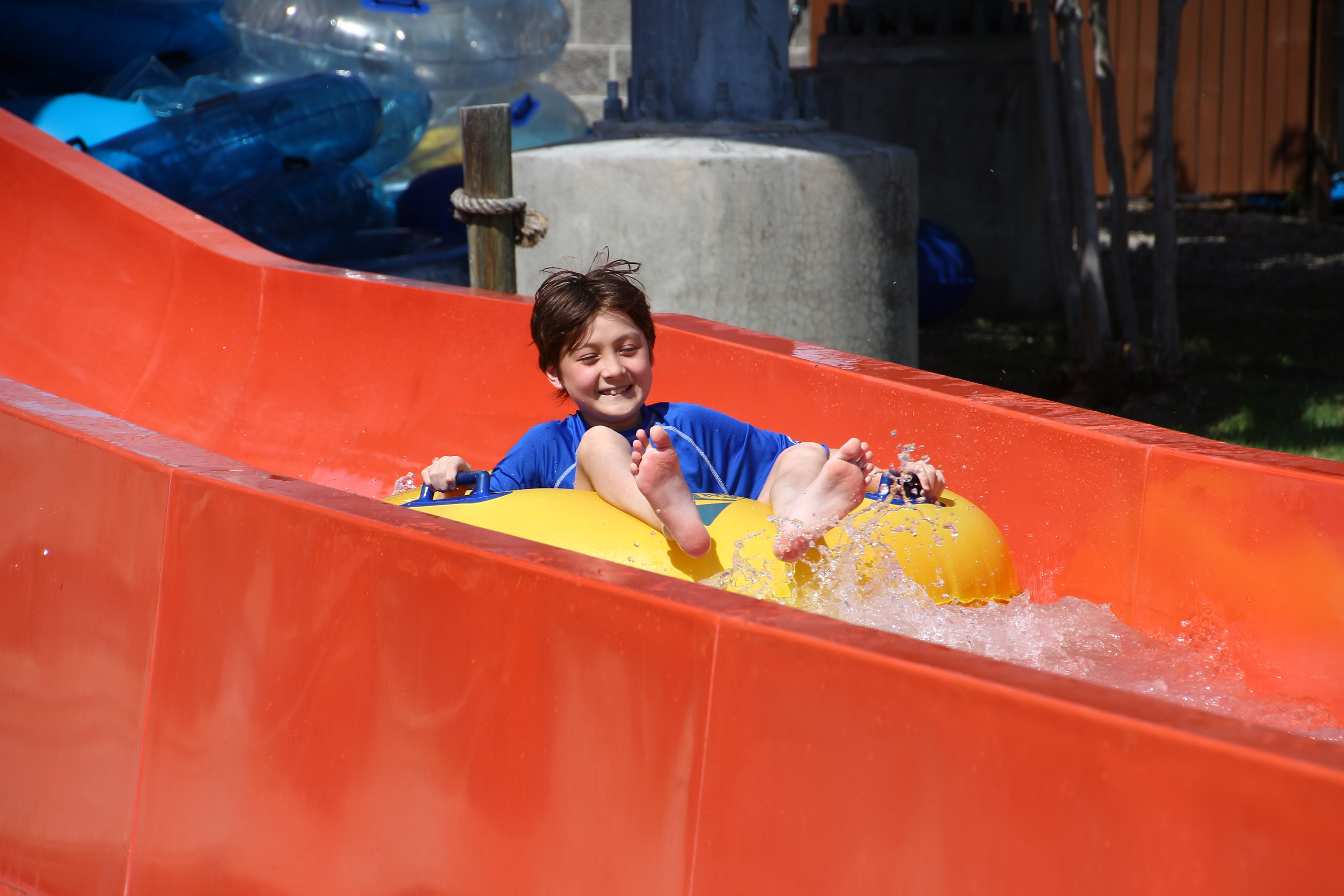
Boy riding a water tube slide at The Colony Park in The Colony, Texas

A water slide (also referred to as a flume, water chute, or hydroslide) is a type of slide designed for warm-weather or indoor recreational use at swimming pools or water parks. Water slides differ in their riding method and therefore size. Some slides require riders to sit directly on the slide, or on a raft or tube designed to be used with the slide.

A typical water slide uses a pump system to pump water to the top which is then allowed to freely flow down its surface. The water reduces friction so sliders travel down the slide very quickly. Water slides run into a swimming pool (often called a plunge pool) or a long run-out chute.

== Traditional water slides ==
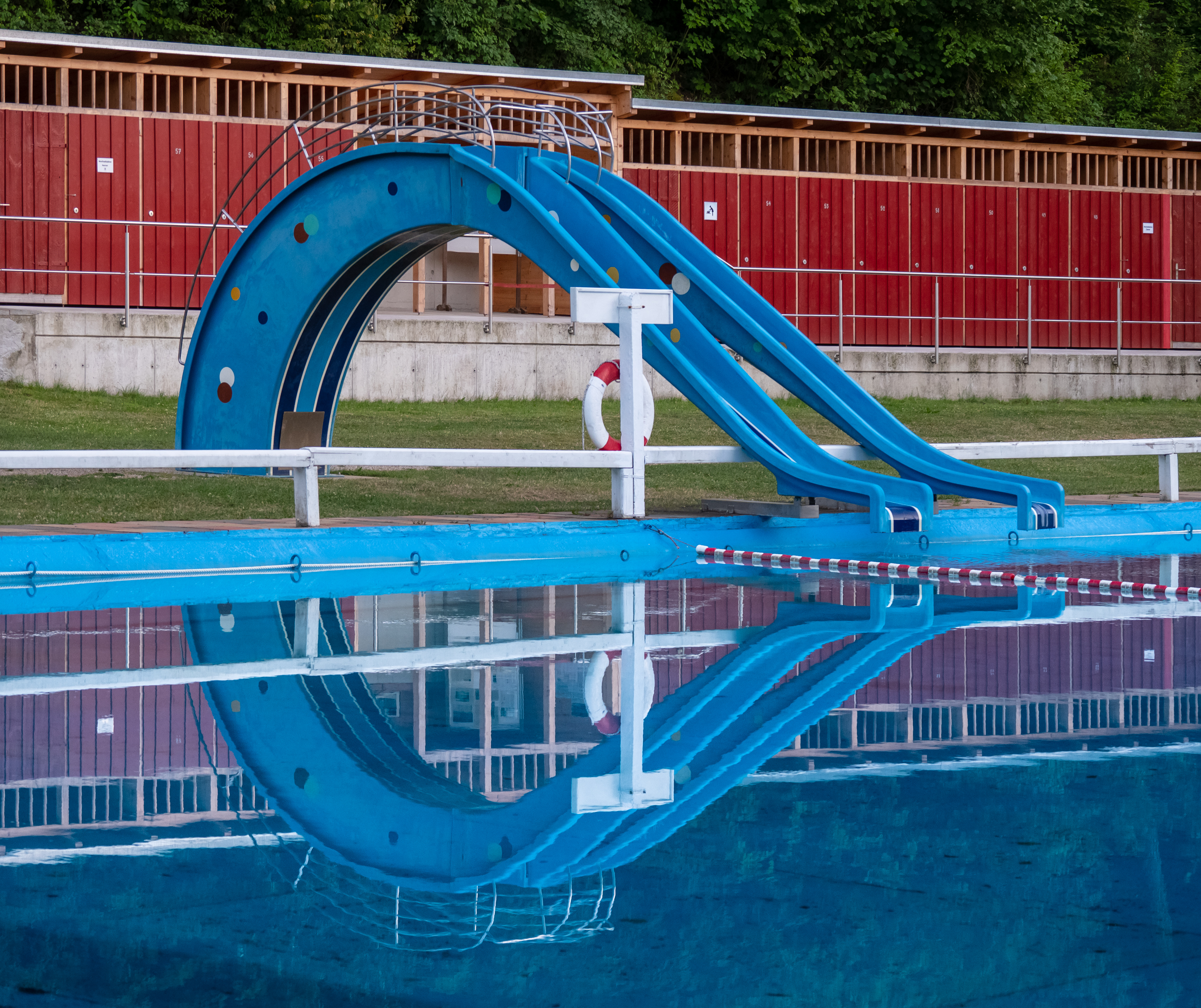
Simple body slides, into a large swimming pool

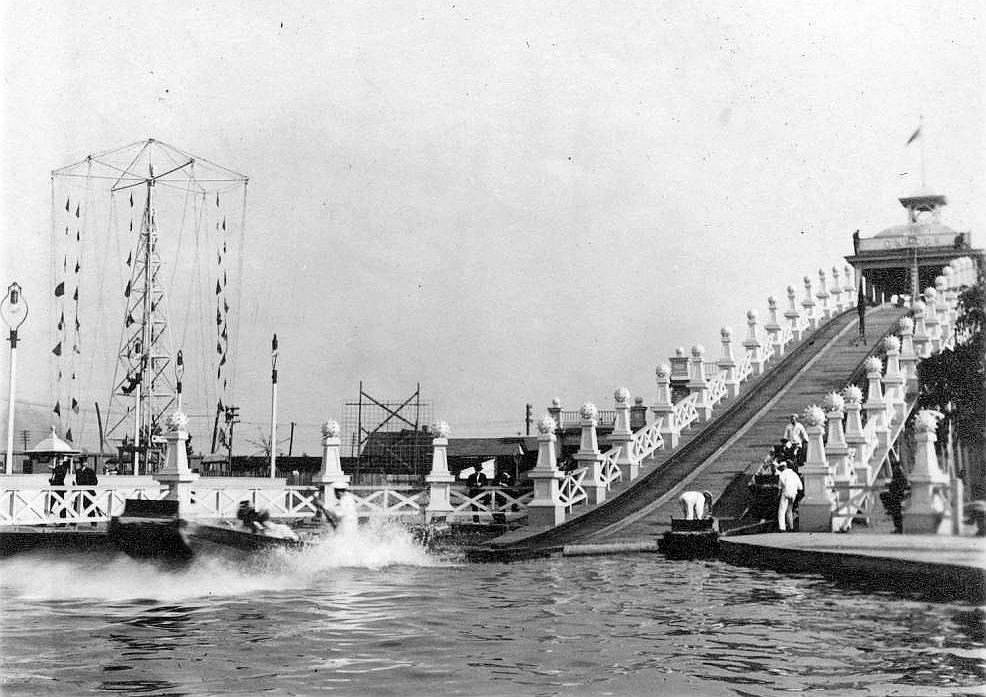
"Shoot the Chutes" at Wonderland Amusement Park in Indianapolis, 1906

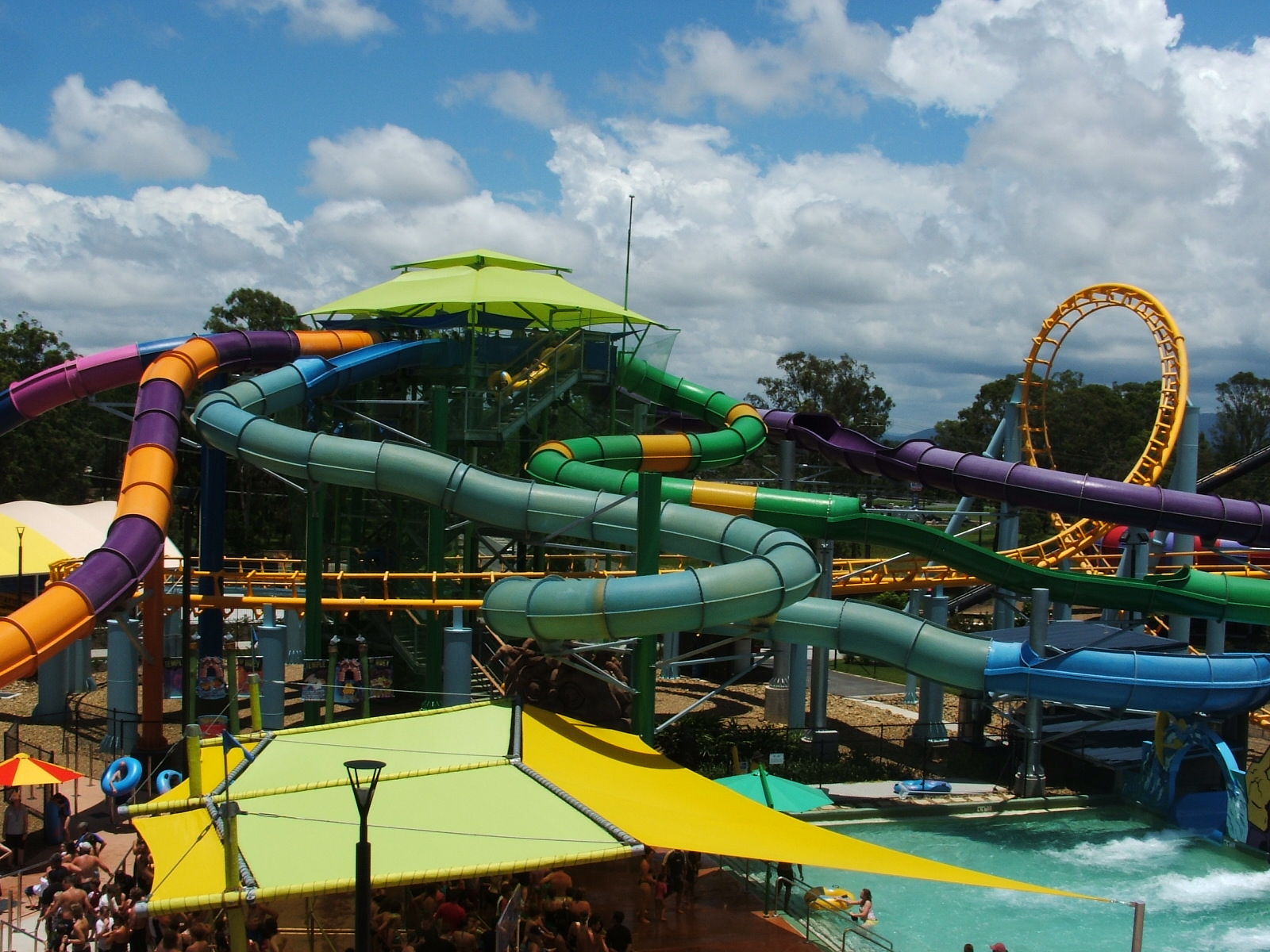
A collection of inline tube slides at WhiteWater World on the Gold Coast, Australia

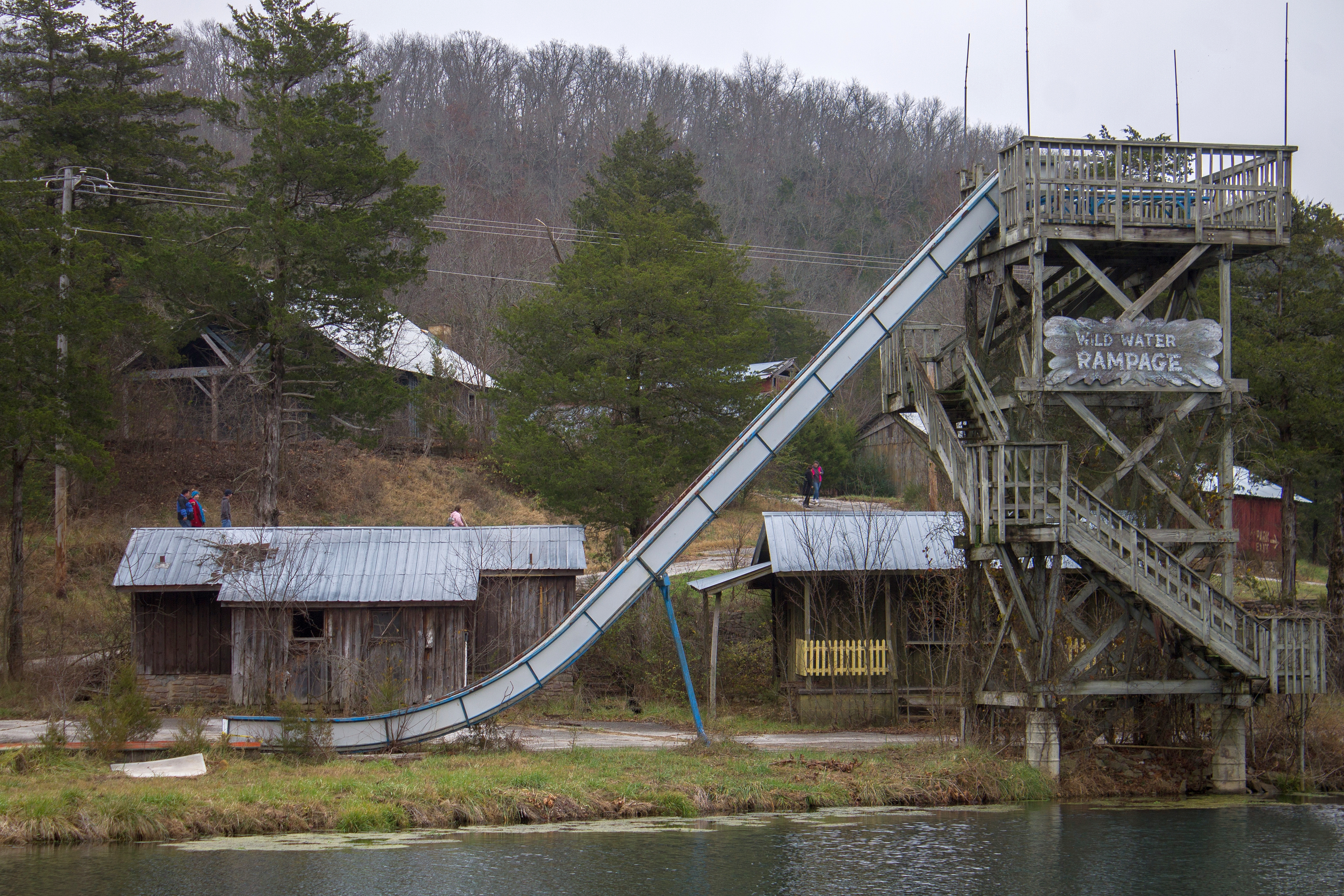
"Wild Water Rampage" at Dogpatch USA, an abandoned theme park in Marble Falls, Arkansas

=== Body slides ===
Body slides feature no mat or tube, instead having riders sit or lie directly on the surface of the slide. The simplest resemble wet playground slides.

There are a variety of types of body slides including flumes, speed slides, bowls and AquaLoops; the latter three are explained below.

=== Inline tube slides ===
Some slides are designed to be ridden with a tube which typically seats either 2 or 3 riders inline. Similar to a traditional body slide, these slides include many twists and turns and come in a variety of types including bowls, funnels and half-pipes.

=== Longest ===
The "Waterslide" at Buena Vista Lodge in Costa Rica is a 400-metre (1,300-foot) long water slide where the rider sits directly on the slide, with an inner-tube around their upper body for safety.

The longest multi-person water-coaster (see below) is the 1,763-foot (537 m) long Mammoth at Holiday World in Santa Claus, Indiana.

The current longest water slide, "The Longest", is a permanent single-passenger tube waterslide located in Penang, Malaysia, at the ESCAPE family theme park. Visitors access the attraction via a cable car system and ride down the slide for approximately 4 minutes whilst navigating through 1,111 metres (3,645 ft) of scenic jungle.

Until 2019, the world's longest water slide was a temporary installation in Waimauku, New Zealand, in February 2013, which was constructed with a length of 650 metres (2,130 ft), of which 550 metres (1,800 ft) functioned properly. Its creators claimed the previous record holder had a length of ~350 metres (1,150 ft). The slide was moved to Action Park in Vernon, New Jersey in 2015.

== 21st century water slides ==
=== Looping water slides ===
The first known existence of a looping water slide was at Action Park in Vernon Township, New Jersey in the mid-1980s, named Cannonball Loop. This slide featured a vertical loop but was repeatedly closed due to safety concerns. In the late 2000s, Austrian manufacturer Aquarena developed the world's first safe looping water slide, known as the AquaLoop. The company engineered a slide with an inclined loop rather than a standard vertical one. The slide is currently licensed and distributed by Canadian water slide manufacturer WhiteWater West. There are nearly 20 AquaLoop installations around the world. The first installation was in Slovenia in 2008. The largest collections are located at Wet'n'Wild Gold Coast and Raging Waters Sydney in Australia, which both house 4 AquaLoops that opened in 2010 and 2013, respectively. Wet'n'Wild Gold Coast was also the first to install more than one AquaLoop at a single location. The AquaLoop uses a trap-door to release riders down a 17-metre (56 ft) near-vertical descent at a speed of up to 60 kilometres per hour (37 mph). Riders experience 2.5 Gs in less than 2 seconds. The whole ride is over within 7 seconds.

=== Bowl ===
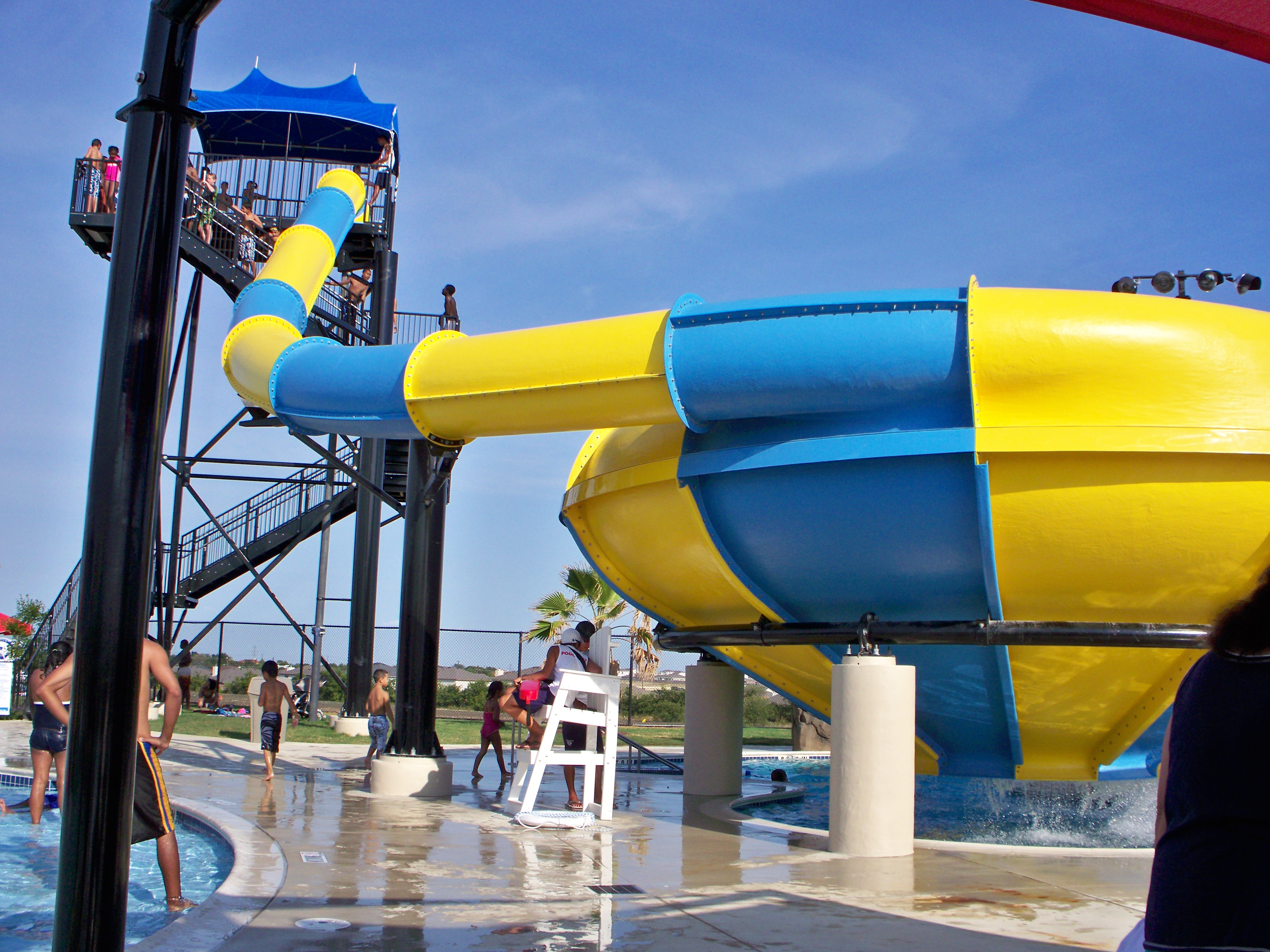
An example of a water slide bowl attraction

A bowl is a type of water slide where riders descend a steep drop into a round bowl. Under the effects of centrifugal force, the riders circle the outer area of the bowl before exiting down through the middle, often into a pool underneath but sometimes into an additional slide section. This style of water slide comes in various styles and is manufactured by ProSlide, WhiteWater West and Waterfun Products. The different variations can be ridden on a 4-person cloverleaf tube, 2 person inline tube, single person tube or as a body slide.

=== Family rafting ===
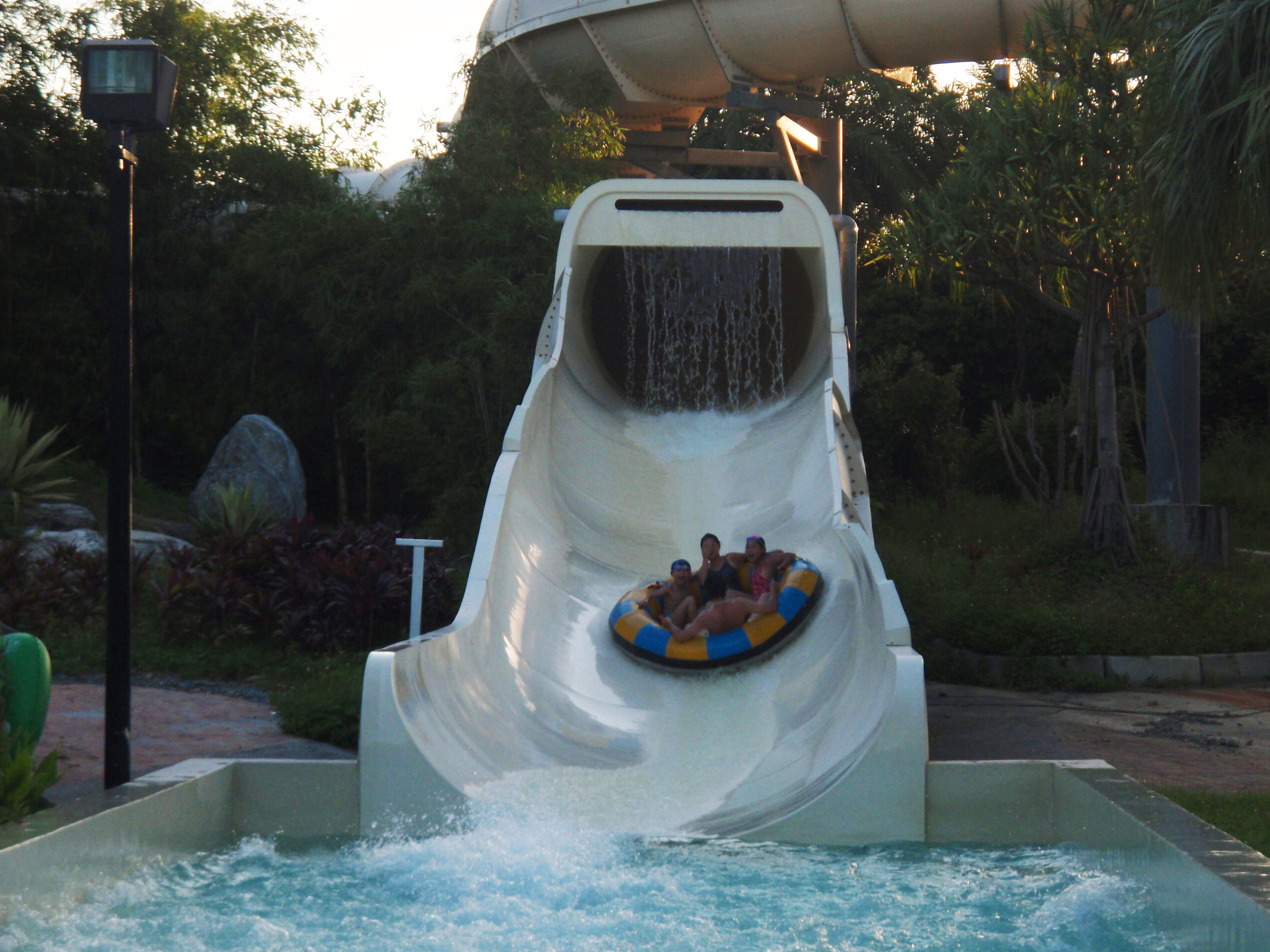
A family rafting water slide attraction at Formosa Fun Coast in Taiwan

Family rafting water slides have the largest capacity of all the different types of tubing water slides averaging between 4 and 6 riders per dispatch. Riders hop in a circular raft and travel down long, twisted 4.5-metre (15 ft) channels to the ground. This type of water slide is manufactured by Australian Waterslides and Leisure, ProSlide, Waterfun Products and WhiteWater West. All of these companies manufacture open-air slides while ProSlide also manufactures an enclosed version.

=== Funnel ===
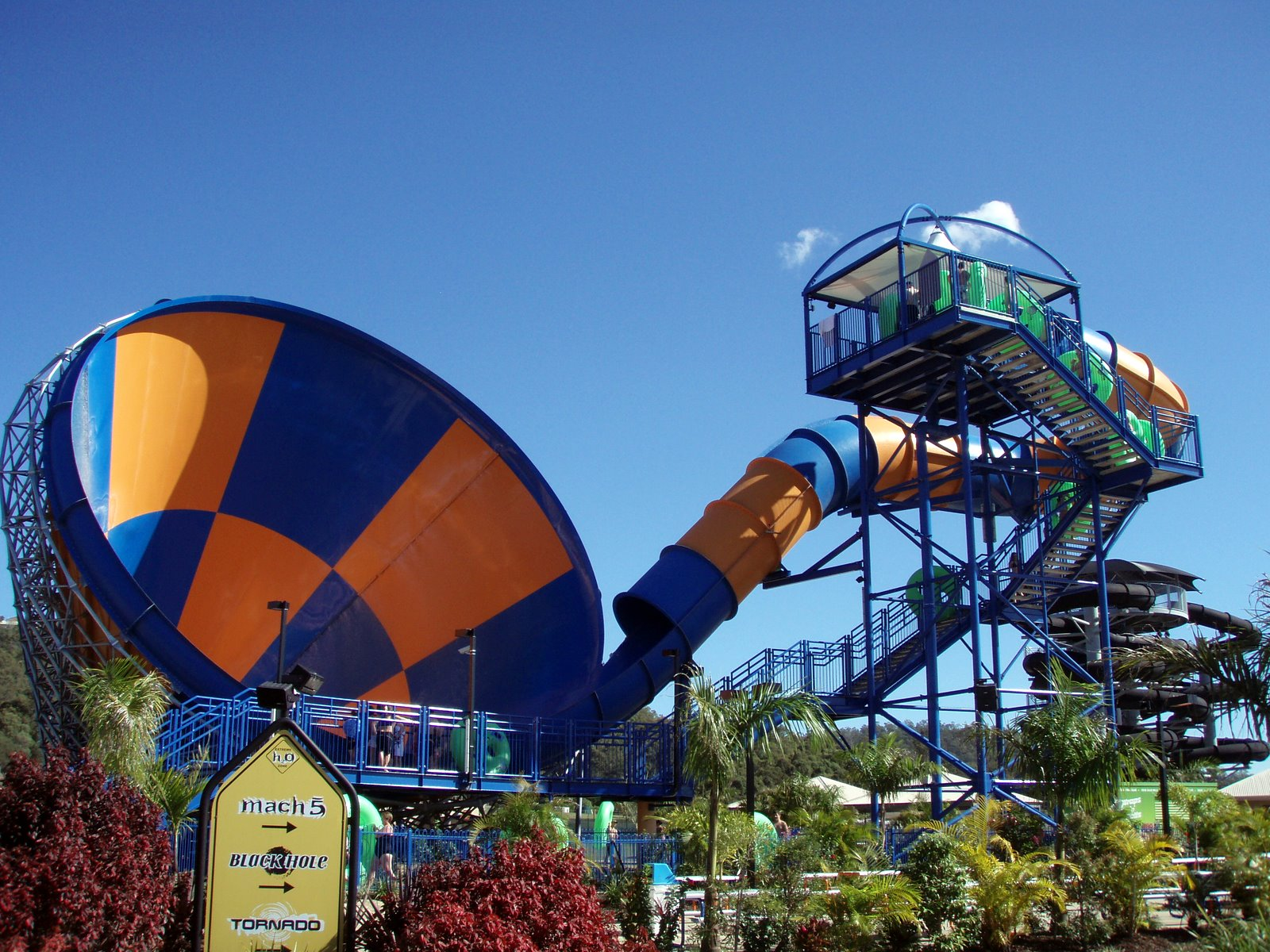
A ProSlide Tornado at Wet'n'Wild Gold Coast on the Gold Coast, Australia

A funnel water slide requires riders to sit in a 2 or 4 seater round tube. Riders drop from inside a tunnel out into the ride's main element shaped like a funnel on its side. Riders oscillate from one side to the other until they exit through the back of the funnel and into a splash pool. The most common type of funnel is the ProSlide Tornado which is installed at almost 60 locations around the world dating back to 2003. In 2010, WhiteWater West began developing a competing product known as the Abyss, utilizing a raft that holds up to six riders.

=== Half-pipes ===
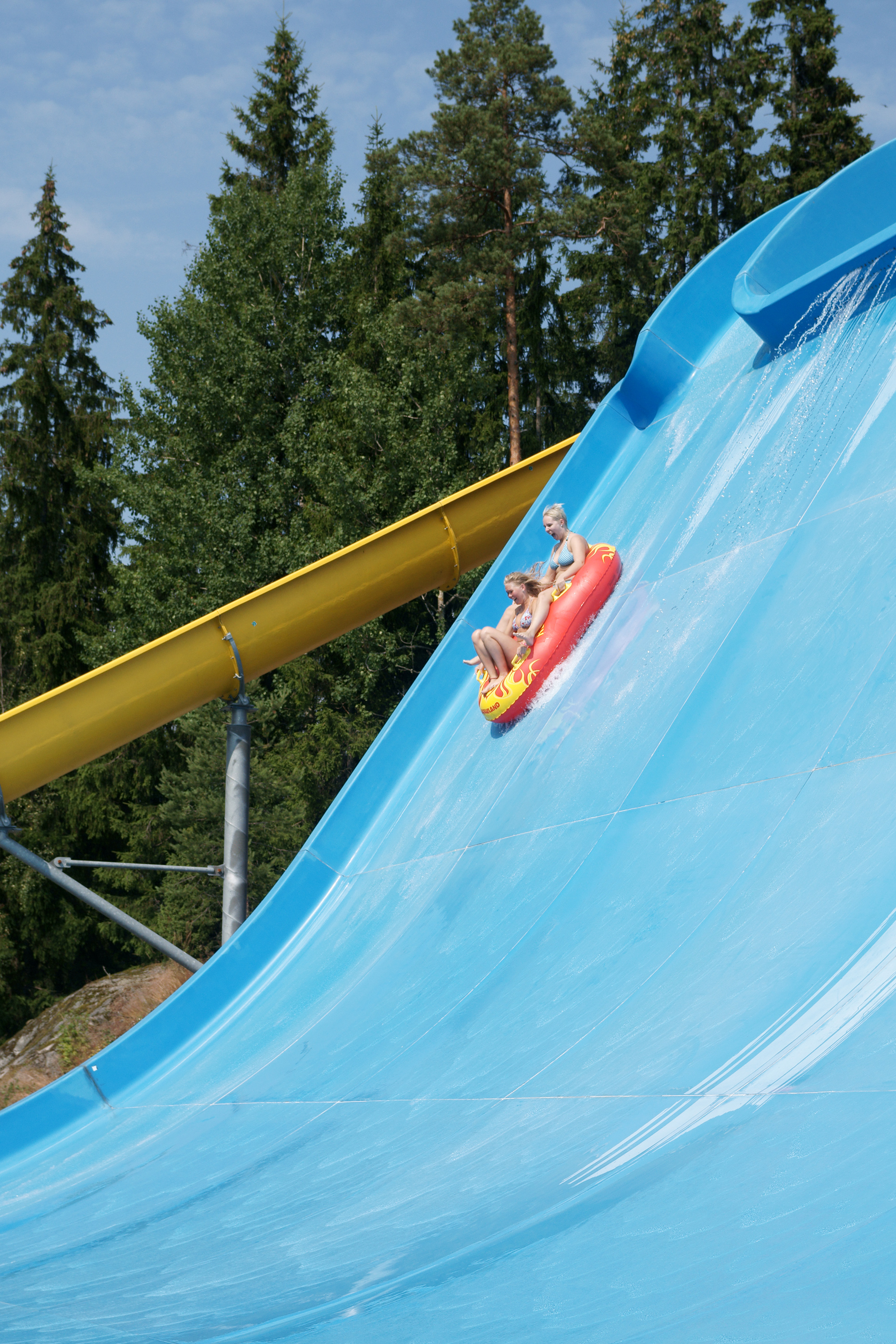
A half-pipe at the Serena Waterpark in Lahnus, Espoo, Finland

Similar to a funnel, a half-pipe features a slide in which riders oscillate back and forth. However, this style of ride doesn't feature any enclosed sections. On a Waterfun Product Sidewinder or Sidewinder Mini, riders oscillate several times before coming to a rest at the base of the slide. Riders then need to walk off the slide returning their tube to the next riders.

A variation of the half-pipe called a wall slide typically has a steep enclosed section that exits to a wider upward-rising section that the rider then slides back down the other direction to the end of the slide.

=== Multi-lane racer ===
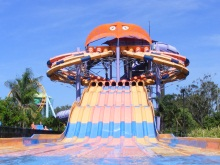
A multi-lane racer at WhiteWater World on the Gold Coast, Australia

A multi-lane racer is a ride where between 4 and 8 riders dive head-first onto a mat and down a slide with several dips. As an additional component of this ride, some offer an additional enclosed helix at the top of the ride. ProSlide offer ProRacers, Octopus Racers, Kraken Racers and Rally Racers, while WhiteWater West have designed the Mat Racers and Whizzards. In 2016, WhiteWater West introduced the Mat Blaster, which combines the Whizzard model with elements of their MasterBlaster water coaster. Australian Waterslides and Leisure have also manufactured a standard multi-lane racer.

=== Speed slide ===
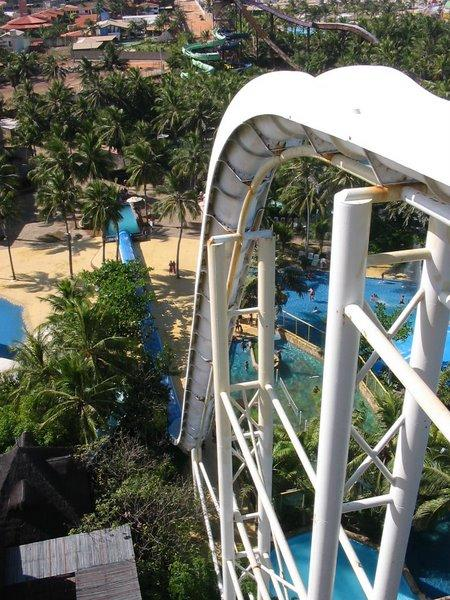
A speed slide at Beach Park in Brazil

A speed slide is a type of body slide where riders are sent down steep, free-fall plunges to the ground. Almost all water slide manufacturers offer a variation of this type of slide. ProSlide & WhiteWater West both offer a speed slide with a trap door, the same trap door found on the AquaLoop.

=== Water coaster ===
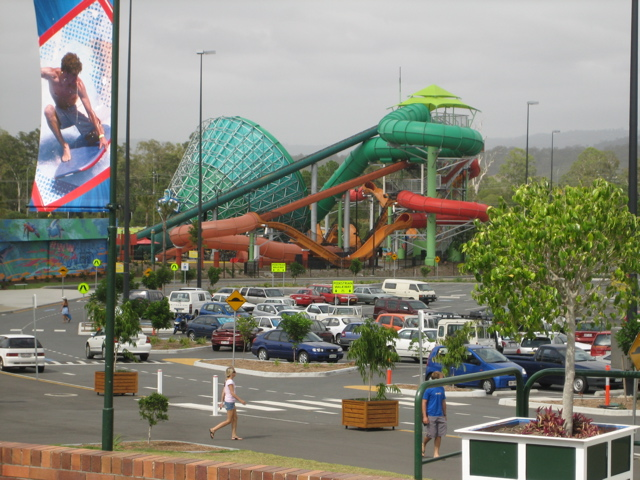
A funnel slide and water coaster at WhiteWater World on the Gold Coast, Australia

A water coaster is a water slide that emulates a roller coaster by providing not only descents, but also ascents. There are three different ways water coasters operate: water jets, conveyor belts, and linear induction motors. High-powered water jets power the first type of water coaster, generically known as “Master Blasters”. Originally manufactured by New Braunfels General Store (NBGS), the rights were sold in December 2006 to WhiteWater West of Canada. The first installations of this type of ride were Dragon Blaster and Family Blaster, installed in 1994, at Schlitterbahn in New Braunfels, Texas. The following month, a third Master Blaster opened at Adventure Bay in Houston, Texas. This type of ride features over 70 installations worldwide. The largest collection of Master Blasters is at Wild Wadi Water Park in Dubai, where 9 of the park's 16 water slides utilize this technology, propelling riders to the top of a mountain. In 2021, WhiteWater West opened their tallest Master Blaster, and tallest water coaster in the world, Tsunami Surge at Six Flags Hurricane Harbor Chicago.

The first conveyor belt was installed at Kalahari Resort in Sandusky, Ohio. Known as the Zip Coaster, the ride carries guests quickly uphill and over steep slides using high-speed conveyor belts. The third incarnation of the water coaster utilizes linear induction motors (LIM technology) and specially designed rafts. The first installation to use LIM technology was Deluge, opening in 2006 at what was (at the time) Splash Kingdom at Six Flags Kentucky Kingdom.

The longest water coaster utilizing this magnetic system is Mammoth, at Splashin' Safari in Santa Claus, Indiana. This technology has been adapted to other ProSlide products, and is collectively known as the ProSlide HydroMAGNETIC. In 2010, ProSlide announced that they would be combining the family rafting and water coaster technologies to create a Hydromagnetic Mammoth. The first installation of this variation was Mammoth, which opened in 2012 at Splashin' Safari in Indiana. It surpassed the park's Wildebeest as the longest water coaster in the world.

=== Drop-launch capsule ===
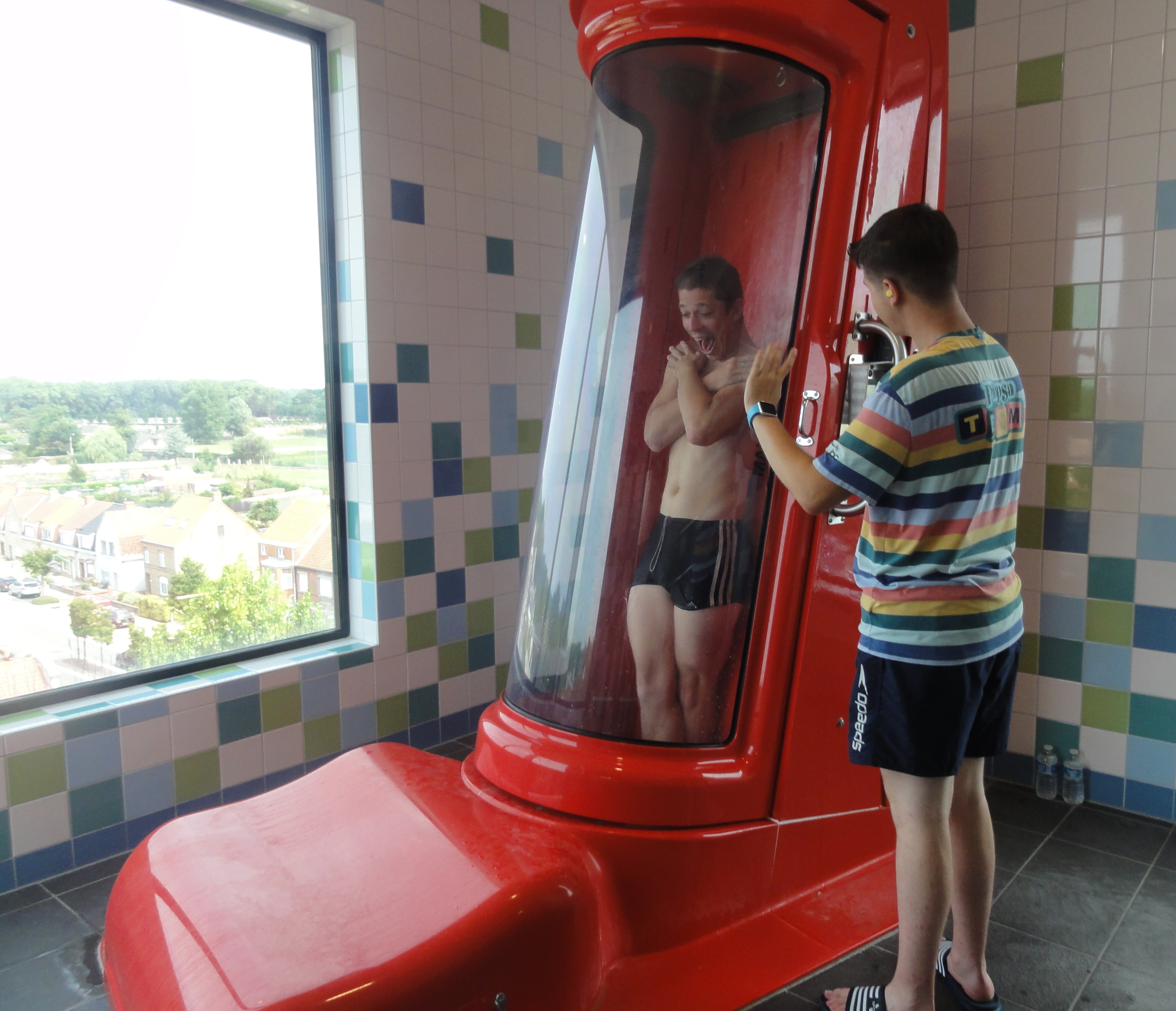
Sky Drop at Plopsaqua, Belgium

A drop-launch capsule is a device that is placed at the start of a body slide. Riders step into a capsule, usually with a clear front. Once the capsule is closed, a hatch opens underneath the riders dropping them into a near-vertical portion of the slide. The feature is known by different names from various manufacturers. ProSlide calls it a SkyBox, WhiteWater West refers to it as an AquaDrop.

=== River stream slide ===
A river slide, also sometimes known as "crazy rivers", resembles a stream, and may feature buffer pools throughout the way down. Its mass sliding ability, meaning multiple people can safely slide simultaneously, clears its queue area at a faster rate.

== Inflatable water slides ==
Children play in an inflatable water slide at their home

Inflatable water slides are typically made of a thick strong PVC or vinyl and nylon, and are inflated using a blower. The water slide is attached to a water hose in order to generate the supply of water. There are small-sized inflatable water slides for private house uses or larger inflatable water slides for school, picnic, corporate, or carnival style use.
