= Wildebeest (ride) =

Water slide at Holiday World & Splashin' Safari

Holiday World & Splashin' Safari
- Area: Splashin' Safari
- Coordinates: 38.1243°N 86.9136°W
- Status: Operating
- Cost: US$5,500,000
- Opening date: May 7, 2010

General statistics
- Type: Water coaster
- Manufacturer: ProSlide Technology
- Model: HydroMagnetic Rocket
- Course: Custom
- Lift system: Conveyor belt lift hill and 8 uphill launches powered by linear induction motors
- Height: 64 ft (20 m)
- Drop: 38 ft (12 m)
- Length: 1,710 ft (520 m)
- Speed: 24.5 mph (39.4 km/h)
- Max vertical angle: 45°
- Capacity: 720 riders per hour
- Duration: 2:30
- Boats: 14 boats. Riders are arranged 1 across in 4 rows for a total of 4 riders per boat.
- Height restriction: 42 in (107 cm)
- Single rider line available
- Must transfer from wheelchair

Wildebeest is a water coaster at Holiday World & Splashin' Safari in Santa Claus, Indiana. It was designed by ProSlide Technology in 2009, and it opened to the public on May 7, 2010. Wildebeest is named after the African mammal of the same name, keeping with the water park's safari theme. When it was completed in 2010, Wildebeest took the record for the world's longest water coaster at 1,710 feet (520 m) long. It held that record until May 11, 2012, when Mammoth, Holiday World's second water coaster, debuted at 1,763 feet (537 m) long. In 2010, Wildebeest was voted the world's Best New Waterpark Ride at the Golden Ticket Awards, which are presented annually by Amusement Today magazine. Wildebeest was also awarded the Golden Ticket Award for Best Waterpark Ride in 2010, 2011, and 2022.

== History ==
On August 13, 2009, Holiday World & Splashin' Safari announced Wildebeest, a HydroMagnetic Rocket slide that was to be built to the north of Bahari Wave Pool. Unique to Wildebeest was its use of a conveyor belt to transport riders uphill from ground level. This allowed park guests unable to climb stairs to ride, unlike other water coasters at the time. Another unique feature of Wildebeest was its length. When completed, the water coaster was 1,710 feet (520 m) long, making it the longest coaster in the world at the time. During the construction of Wildebeest, producers from National Geographic's World's Toughest Fixes visited the park to document the process. The ride opened on May 7, 2010.

== Characteristics ==
=== Boats ===
Wildebeest uses 14 four-passenger boats. Riders are seated toboggan-style in each boat. Each rider has two handles to hold onto. To allow the linear induction motors to interact with the boats and propel them uphill, a magnetic metal plate is attached to the underside of every boat.

=== Slide ===
Wildebeest is made out of numerous pieces of molded red and yellow fiberglass supported by concrete pillars. The total length of the slide is 1,710 feet (520 m), and it includes seven drops, with the largest being 38 feet (12 m), in addition to two underground tunnels. The track features a conveyor belt lift hill, as well as eight linear induction motors (LIMs) that propel the boats uphill.

=== LIM technology ===
The technology on HydroMagnetic Rocket slides utilizes LIMs to propel boats uphill. An alternating magnetic field beneath the slide surface interacts with a steel plate mounted on the underside of each boat to push them uphill smoothly and quickly. Because the magnetic field under the slide surface needs power in order to be activated, boats will not be able to make it uphill in the case of a power outage.

== Experience ==
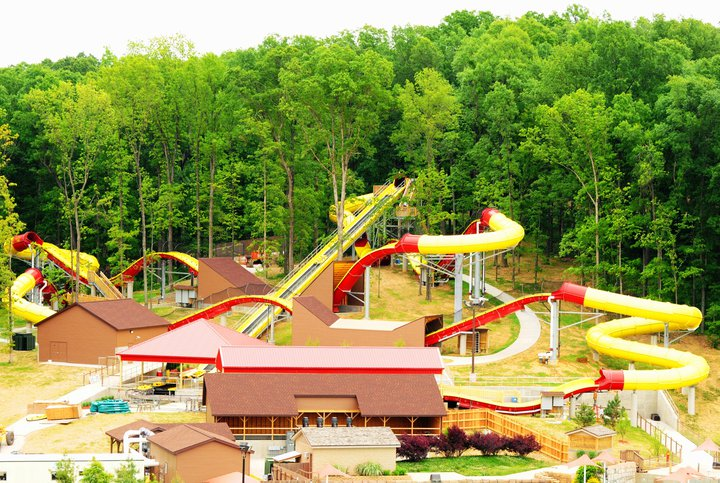
An overview of Wildebeest

A full ride experience on Wildebeest lasts approximately two minutes and thirty seconds.

Upon dispatch, the boat enters the conveyer belt lift hill. At the top of the lift hill, the boat moves from the conveyor belt onto the fiberglass slide. At this point the boat makes a left turn before entering the ride's initial 38 feet (12 m) drop at a 45° angle. During the descent, the boat passes under the lift hill before being rocketed back uphill by the first of eight LIMs. The boat crests the hill before making a small drop and being launched uphill for a second time. At the top of the hill the boat makes a right turn before traveling downhill and into the first of the two underground tunnels.

At the bottom of the drop inside the tunnel, the boat passes under the ride's lift hill before it is immediately sent back uphill and out of the tunnel. At the crest of this hill the boat exits the tunnel and makes a small drop before traveling uphill thanks to the fourth LIM. The boat makes a right turn while slightly descending. At the conclusion of the turn, riders are sent back uphill again. At the top of the hill the boat makes a left turn before being sent uphill, where the boat passes over the lift hill. At the top of this hill the boat immediately drops back down and into the second underground tunnel. At the bottom of the drop, the boat is once again launched uphill and out of the tunnel. At the top of this hill the boat completes a left-turning helix before making a slight turn to the right to line up with the unloading station. The boat then returns to the station.

== Awards and records ==
In addition to other awards, Wildebeest was voted the world's Best New Waterpark Ride at the 2010 Golden Ticket Awards.

Golden Ticket Awards: Best Waterpark Ride
Year	2010	2011	2012	2013	2014	2015	2016	2017	2018	2019	2020	2021	2022	2023	2024	2025
Ranking	1	1	1	1	1	1	N/A	1	1	1	N/A	1	1	2	1	2

Preceded by Black Anaconda	World's Longest Water Coaster; May 7, 2010 – May 10, 2012	Succeeded by Mammoth
