= Mammoth (ride) =

Water slide at Holiday World & Splashin' Safari

Holiday World & Splashin' Safari
- Area: Splashin' Safari
- Coordinates: 38.1238°N 86.9122°W
- Status: Operating
- Cost: US$9,000,000
- Opening date: May 11, 2012

General statistics
- Type: Water coaster
- Manufacturer: ProSlide Technology
- Model: HydroMagnetic Mammoth
- Course: Custom
- Lift system: Conveyor belt lift hill and 6 uphill launches powered by linear induction motors
- Height: 69 ft (21 m)
- Drop: 32 ft (9.8 m)
- Length: 1,763 ft (537 m)
- Max vertical angle: 45°
- Capacity: 1,100 riders per hour
- Duration: 3:00
- Height restriction: 42 in (107 cm)
- Round Spinner Boats: 10 boats. Riders are arranged in an inward-facing circle for a total of 6 riders per boat.
- Single rider line available
- Must transfer from wheelchair

Mammoth is a water coaster at Holiday World & Splashin' Safari in Santa Claus, Indiana. It was designed by ProSlide Technology in 2011, and it opened to the public on May 11, 2012. Mammoth is named after the mammoth, a now-extinct prehistoric mammal, keeping with the water park's general safari theme. When it was completed in 2012, Mammoth became the world's longest water coaster at 1,763 feet (537 m) long. It claimed that title from Holiday World's first water coaster, Wildebeest, which is 1,710 feet (520 m) long.

== History ==
On August 3, 2011, Holiday World & Splashin' Safari announced Mammoth, a ProSlide HydroMagnetic water slide, that was to be built to the east of Wildebeest. Unlike Wildebeest, which uses four-passenger toboggan-style boats, Mammoth was to use round 6-passenger boats. When completed, Mammoth was 1,763 feet (537 m) long, making it the longest water coaster in the world.

Mammoth opened on May 11, 2012.

== Characteristics ==
=== Boats ===
Mammoth uses a total of ten yellow 6-passenger boats called "round spinners". In each of the boats, riders are seated in a circle facing each other. Each seat has two handles to hold onto. To allow the linear induction motors (LIMs) to interact with the boats and propel them uphill, a magnetic metal plate is attached to the underside of every boat. When it opened, Mammoth was the only water coaster to utilize this type of boat.

=== Slide ===
Mammoth is made of numerous pieces of molded red, yellow, and blue fiberglass supported by concrete pillars. The total length of the slide is 1,763 feet (537 m) and it includes seven drops, with the largest being 32 feet (9.8 m). The track features a conveyor belt lift hill, as well as six LIMs that propel the boats back uphill, including the longest LIM on a water coaster.

=== LIM technology ===
The technology on HydroMagnetic Rocket slides utilizes LIMs to propel boats uphill. An alternating magnetic field beneath the slide surface interacts with a steel plate mounted on the underside of each boat to push them uphill smoothly and quickly. Because the magnetic field under the slide surface needs power in order to be activated, boats will not be able to make it uphill in the case of a power outage.

== Experience ==
A full ride experience on Mammoth lasts approximately three minutes.

Upon dispatch, the boat travels enters the conveyor belt lift hill. At the top of the lift hill, the boat moves from the conveyor belt onto the fiberglass slide. At this point the boat makes a right turn before entering the ride's initial 32 feet (9.8 m) drop at a 45° angle. Following the descent, the boat is sent back uphill by the first of six linear induction motors. The boat crests the hill and makes a left turn, in preparation for a dropping, right-hand, hairpin turn. At the bottom of the turn, the boat is sent uphill for a second time before making another descent.

At the bottom of the third drop the boat passes under the lift hill and is launched uphill a third time. The boat turns left before it drops down under the lift hill. At this point the boat glides uphill and into a left-hand, 270° turn. The boat then travels downhill before going back uphill, this time over the lift hill. After going down hill and uphill one more time, the boat enters a right-turning helix. Once the boat has navigated the helix, it makes a left turn before dropping a final time. At the conclusion of the drop it lands in a splash pool of water, floating in a current with mild rapids for several yards before making a left turn to line up with the end-of-the-ride conveyor belt. The boat then returns to the station.

== Awards and records ==
Mammoth was voted the world's Best New Waterpark Ride at the 2012 Golden Ticket Awards.

Preceded by Wildebeest	World's Longest Water Coaster; May 11, 2012 – Present	Current holder

== See also ==
- 2012 in amusement parks
