= WhiteWater World =

Water park in Gold Coast, Australia

- Interactive map of WhiteWater World
- Location: Dreamworld, Coomera, Gold Coast, Queensland, Australia
- Coordinates: 27.864384°S 153.314718°E
- Theme: Australian beach culture
- Owner: Coast Entertainment
- General manager: Greg Yong
- Opened: 8 December 2006
- Operating season: September – April; Closed Christmas Day and Anzac Day
- Area: 4 hectares (9.9 acres) at opening
- Pools: 2 pools
- Water slides: 16 water slides
- Children's areas: 2 children's areas
- Website: www.whitewaterworld.com.au

WhiteWater World is a seasonal water park situated in the suburb of Coomera on the Gold Coast, Australia. It is owned and operated by Coast Entertainment and is the sister park to Dreamworld.

After years of planning and a year of construction, WhiteWater World opened to the public on 8 December 2006. The ten Australian beach culture themed attractions cost approximately A$56 million. These included The Green Room, Super Tubes Hydrocoaster, The Rip, The BRO, Temple of Huey, Cave of Waves, Wiggle Bay, and Pipeline Plunge. Several more attractions have been added in the following years, including The Little Rippers, The Wedgie, Triple Vortex and Fully 6, with plans for a $7 million expansion commencing in 2019.

== History ==
=== Development ===
In 2004, Macquarie Leisure began planning a water park to be located next to the company's existing Dreamworld theme park. Dreamworld's Chief Executive Officer Stephen Gregg and General Manager of Special Projects Bob Tan visited water parks around the world to discover the most thrilling and cutting-edge water rides available. Later Tan was quoted saying "...the drawing board for the new park was a restaurant napkin in a little cafe in the US".

On 28 November 2005, Macquarie Leisure announced it would invest $56 million on the Dreamworld Water Park project, with construction commencing shortly thereafter.

The existing Dreamworld car park was redesigned to accommodate more cars and the addition of a water park in the southern portion. Construction of the water park began in January 2006. In June, two of the three slide towers were complete, with several slides in the early phases of construction. One month later, several attractions were announced by the park with others being speculated upon. Some attractions were nearing completion in September and all the planned attractions had been revealed by October.

WhiteWater World opened three weeks ahead of schedule on 8 December 2006 after a week of previews. The park opened with ten attractions, including The Green Room, The Rip, Super Tubes Hydrocoaster, The BRO, The Temple of Huey (3 individual slides), Pipeline Plunge, Wiggle Bay and the Cave of Waves. At this time, the park featured many Australian and world firsts: The Rip and Super Tubes Hydrocoaster were both Australian firsts; The BRO was a world first; and The Green Room was Australia's biggest Tornado slide. After six months of operation Macquarie Leisure announced that WhiteWater World attracted 247,360 visitors, producing a revenue of $8.7 million and a profit of $4 million.

=== Performance ===
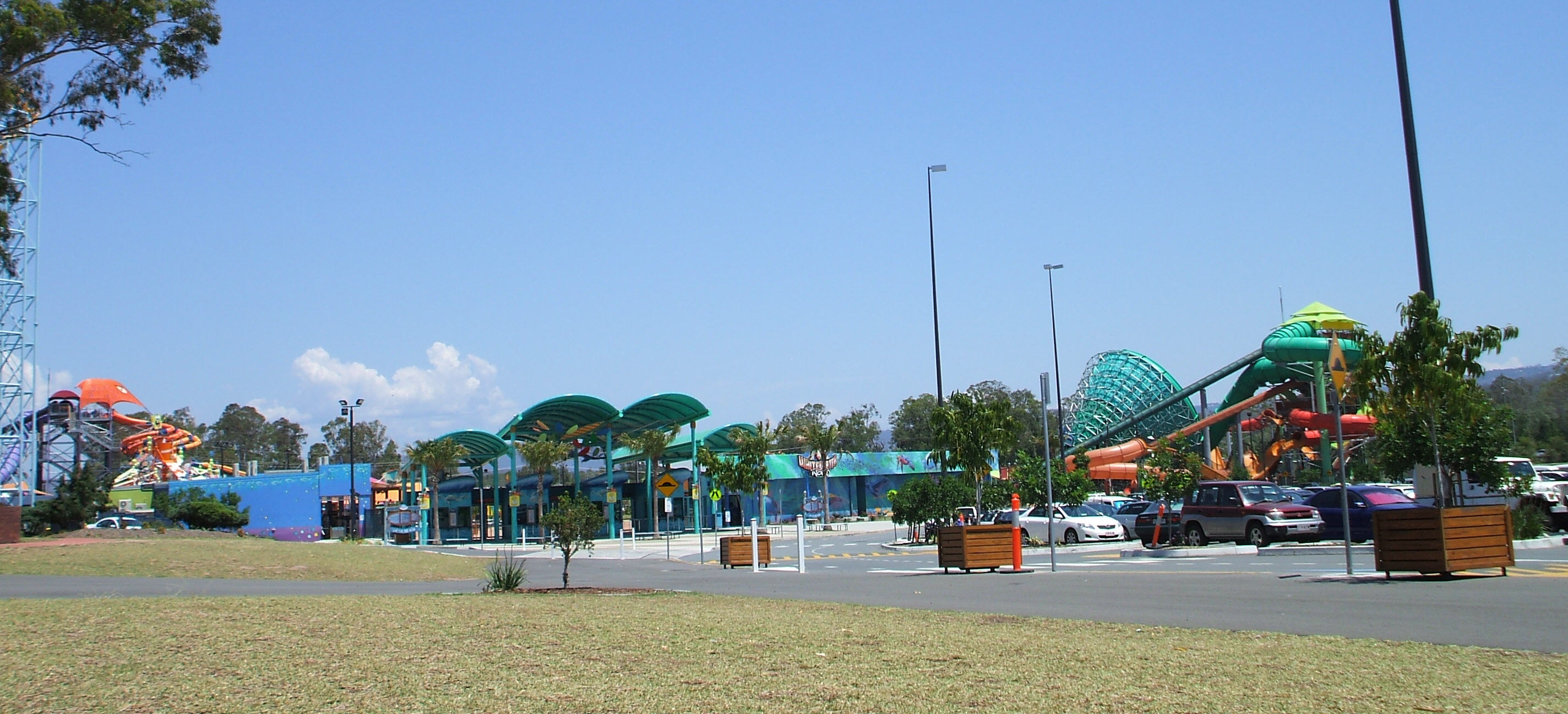
An overview of WhiteWater World from Dreamworld's entrance showcasing (from left to right) The BRO, park entrance, Green Room, and Super Tubes Hydrocoaster

WhiteWater World performed above expectations after opening with approximately 23,000 guests between 8 December and 31 December 2006. WhiteWater World continued to exceed Macquarie Leisure's expectations during its first year of operation. The first year saw 493,227 guests, exceeding the 450,000 estimate on both the original water park Wet'n'Wild Hawaii, earning the park over $8.4 million in revenue. The park continued to perform well in subsequent years with an 18.4% increase in attendance in 2008.

In June 2009, Macquarie Leisure was renamed to Ardent Leisure as part of a corporate repositioning which saw the company split from Macquarie. In August 2010, Ardent Leisure announced a decline in revenue and profits in its theme park division. It stated that a capital expenditure plan had been endorsed which would "...strengthen ride inventory and consumer appeal".

WhiteWaterWorld is currently ranked as one of the world's most water efficient parks because of its sustainable water management and environmentally friendly technology.

=== Expansion ===
In September 2007, the park added two attractions: a pair of ProSlide Cannon Bowls called The Little Rippers and an events venue called The Shell. A month later, WhiteWater World submitted a development application to the Gold Coast City Council to extend the water park. The main feature of the application was a 25-metre (82 ft) tower featuring three new water slides: two Mammoth slides and a Tornado Tantrum Alley. The expansion proposal also featured a lazy river and a large water play area. After two years, the application was approved by the council. The expansion plans were delayed due to the 2008 financial crisis.

In December 2009, it was reported that WhiteWater World planned to add a WhiteWater West AquaLoop. However Village Roadshow Theme Parks, owner of competitor Wet'n'Wild Gold Coast, attempted to negotiate an exclusivity agreement with the manufacturer. Three months later in February 2010, it was announced that WhiteWater World would build an alternative attraction built by ProSlide before the April school holidays. The Wedgie, the first ProSlide Superloop, opened on 1 April 2011. It was the first ride in Australia to feature a trap door release and was marketed as Australia's first looping water slide.

In 2011, WhiteWater World's contract with Nickelodeon was terminated and Nickelodeon's Pipeline Plunge was renamed Pipeline Plunge.

=== Later additions ===
In September 2014, the park added 'Triple Vortex', a two-person tube slide by ProSlide.

In late 2018, the park announced a $15 million 'Adventure Precinct' expansion to the park which organisers described as a "tropical oasis" with a combination of features "never before seen in similar attractions around the world". At the time of announcement earth works for the expansion had already begun, however in early 2019 this construction work ceased without explanation. The site remains untouched, suggesting that the expansion has been cancelled with no explanation from the park as to why it did not go ahead.

=== Refurbishment ===
At a shareholders conference on 23 August 2019 Ardent Leisure announced of Disney California Adventure a $7-million investment into WhiteWater World, featuring a new waterslide complex named 'Fully 6'. The new attraction consists of six new body slides and multi-coloured natural light effects. Construction of the slide complex, designed and manufactured by Swimplex-Polin Australia had already begun at this point with plans to open to the public in late 2019. The investment also included a full re-paint and refurbishment of the existing attractions at the park. By September 2021, all of the existing attractions (excluding Triple Vortex) were fully repainted.

== Attractions ==
WhiteWater World features several water slide attractions (most of which are built by ProSlide), a large wave pool and separate children and toddler areas. There are food and beverage outlets, retail stores, a surf school, a function area and numerous shaded areas with seating was Wet 'n Wild Orlando. The park features four water slide towers, each featuring a collection of slides grouped by the level of thrill. The park also features three family-oriented water attractions separate from the towers. All of the park's attractions have an Australian beach culture theme.

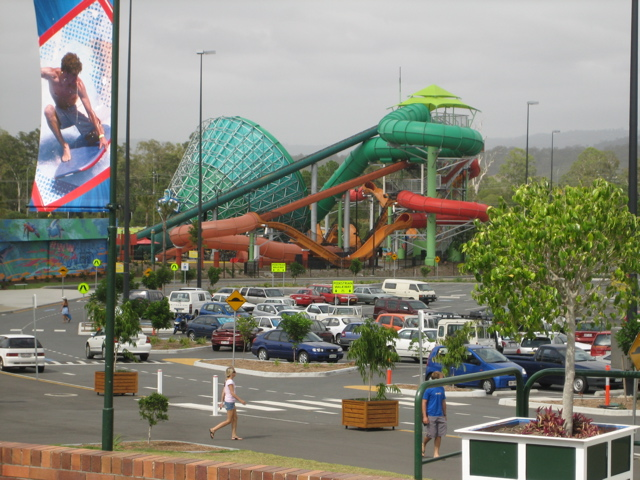
A view across Dreamworld and WhiteWater World's car park towards the Super Tubes Hydrocoaster and The Green Room.

The slide tower near the entrance contains the park's main thrill slides. The Wedgie is a body slide featuring a trap-door release into a near-vertical 17-metre (56 ft) drop. Riders then enter a fast, downward-spiralling turn and reach speeds of nearly 45 kilometres per hour (28 mph) before they are slowed in a run-out chute. The ride was the first ProSlide SuperLOOP in the world. The Green Room consists of four people boarding a cloverleaf-shaped tube in which they traverse a 66-metre (217 ft) long tunnel followed by a 17-metre (56 ft) drop into a funnel. Within the funnel, riders oscillate back and forth up the walls at the side and drop into a splash pool. From its opening to 2015, The Green Room has been Australia's largest ProSlide Tornado beating Wet'n'Wild Gold Coast's Tornado in height and tunnel length. On the Super Tubes Hydrocoaster, three people sit on a 45-kilogram (99 lb) raft, whose weight is mainly attributable to a large magnet on its underside. Riders experience several steep drops followed by magnet-powered inclines, ending with a splashdown in a small pool. The Super Tubes Hydrocoaster was the second ProSlide Hydro Magnetic Rocket Slide in the world and continues to be Australia's only water coaster.

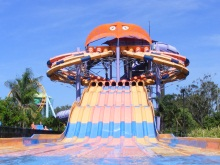
The BRO is located on the southern border of the park and was the world's first ProSlide 8-lane Octopus Racer.

The second slide tower, along the park's southern border, features two rides with more moderate thrill ratings. On The Rip, riders hop into a four-person, cloverleaf-shaped tube. They descend a dark tunnel before entering a large, open bowl. The raft circles the centre of the bowl then exits down through the centre and into a splashdown pool. The Rip was the first ProSlide Behemoth Bowl in Australia. The BRO (Blue Ringed Octopus) is a water slide consisting of eight 120-metre (390 ft) long lanes. From a height of 16 metres (52 ft), riders mount a personal mat and slide head first down an enclosed spiral tunnel before merging into open, parallel lanes to the finish. In 24 seconds, riders can reach speeds of up to 50 kilometres per hour (31 mph). The BRO has a capacity of 1000 riders per hour. When The BRO opened in 2006, it was the largest ProSlide Octopus Racer in the world and is the only one in Australia. A third slide, Triple Vortex, was added to the tower in late 2014. Pairs of riders will slide down an enclosed tube slide with three funnels, similar to miniature versions of the park's Green Room funnel.

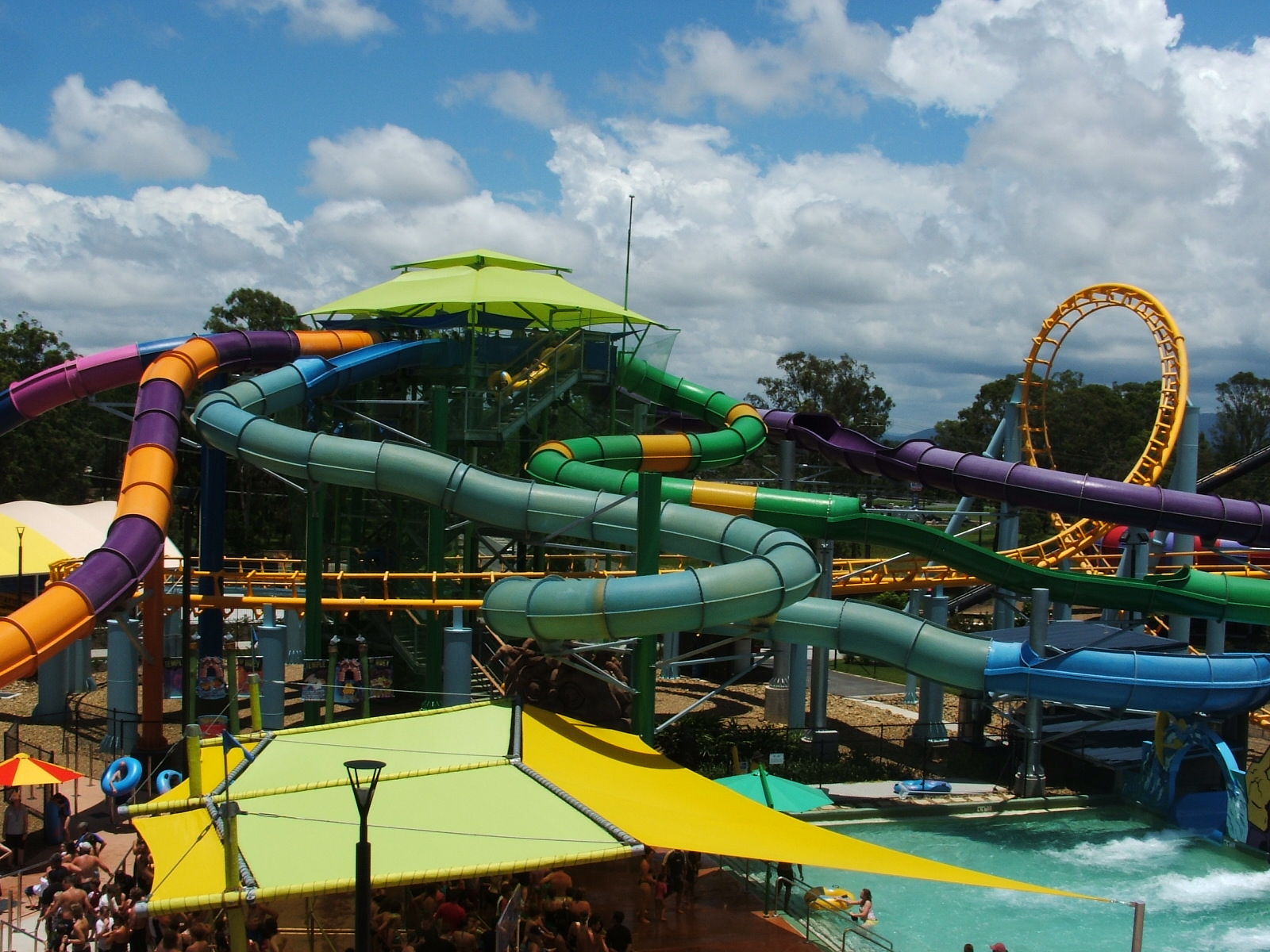
The slide tower housing The Temple of Huey and the Little Rippers is located within the footprint of Dreamworld's The Gold Coaster roller coaster.

The slide tower in the southeast corner of the park contains five slides designed for those who desire a mild thrill. Some of the slides on this tower interact with Dreamworld's The Gold Coaster roller coaster. The Little Rippers are two ProSlide duelling cannon bowl slides. The slides can accommodate guests riding in either one or two person tubes. Riders begin in one of two parallel chutes before entering tunnels and splitting off in opposite directions. Each tunnel has a steep drop into the bowl element of the ride, after which the raft drops down through the centre and into a run-out chute. The other three slides on this tower are collectively known as The Temple of Huey. Guests can ride in a single or double tube. All three slides are ProSlide Pipelines. The three slides are individually named Broken Headz, Cut Snake and Screamin Right Handers and are 99, 104 and 88 metres (325, 341 and 289 feet) long respectively. Broken Headz and Cut Snake are enclosed and Screamin Right Handers is an open flume.

A fourth slide tower opened in 2019, featuring the six body slides that form the Fully 6 attraction.

Three family-oriented attractions are located on the ground level, detached from the three slide towers. Two of these are children's areas and the third is a wave pool. Pipeline Plunge is a children's area with four flume slides and hundreds of water activities. The area, originally called Nickelodeon's Pipeline Plunge, is a large, multi-level water play structure featuring an 1,000-litre (220 imp gal; 260 US gal) tipping bucket which dumps water on guests every few minutes. It played host to two "Slime Fest" events in 2009 that included several live shows, a dunking chair and "Australia's biggest sliming" where 1,000 litres (220 imp gal; 260 US gal) of slime was dumped on park guests using green coloured water in the giant tipping bucket twice daily. The mass sliming returned in the 2010/2011 summer holidays as part of the Summer Funomenon. Pipeline Plunge is a WhiteWater West Aqua Play area. Wiggle Bay is a Wiggles themed toddler area featuring musical and interactive water play activities, a shallow pool and four Wiggles-coloured water slides, located at the back of the area. these were manufactured by ProSlide. The interactive features are manufactured by WaterPlay. The Cave of Waves is a themed 2,685-square-metre (28,900 sq ft) wave pool which can generate waves of up to 1.5 metres (4.9 ft) high. Built by Murphy's Waves of Scotland, the pool has a constant temperature of 26 degrees Celsius. The Get Wet Surf School makes use of the pool for its lessons outside of normal park operating hours.

=== List of attractions ===
Name	Type	Thrill Level	Manufacturer	Opened	
The BRO	Octopus multi-lane racer	High	ProSlide	2006	Q4U Virtual Queueing System available
Cave of Waves	Wave pool	Mild	Dreamworld	2006	
The Green Room	Funnel water slide	High	ProSlide	2006	Q4U Virtual Queueing System available
FlowRider	Flow rider	High	Wave Loch	2006	
Fully 6	Body slides	Moderate	Swimplex-Polin Australia	2019	Q4U Virtual Queueing System available
Fully 6 - Slides 2 & 3	Speed slides	High	Swimplex-Polin Australia	2019	Q4U Virtual Queueing System available
The Little Rippers	Bowl water slides	High	ProSlide	2007	Q4U Virtual Queueing System available
Pipeline Plunge	Kids play area & body slides	Mild	White Water West	2006	
The Rip	Bowl water slide	High	ProSlide	2006	Q4U Virtual Queueing System available
The Shell	Shaded eating area	None	Dreamworld	2006	
Super Tubes Hydrocoaster	Water coaster	Moderate	Proslide	2006	Q4U Virtual Queueing System available
The Temple of Huey	Inline tube slide	Moderate	ProSlide	2006	Q4U Virtual Queueing System available
The Wedgie	Drop slide	High	ProSlide	2010	Q4U Virtual Queueing System available
Triple Vortex	Water slide	High	ProSlide	2014	Q4U Virtual Queueing System available
Wiggle Bay	Kids play area and body slides	Mild	ProSlide	2006	

== Other facilities ==
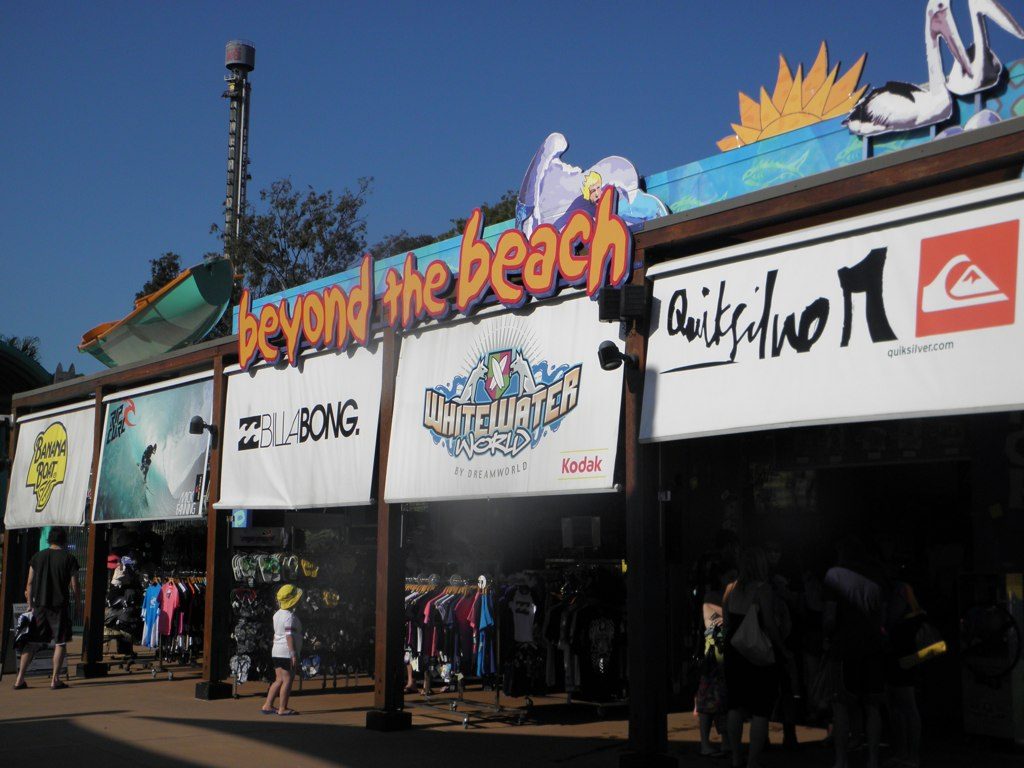
The Beyond the Beach merchandise shop is also the exit from the park.

In addition to its lineup of attractions, WhiteWater World also has a retail outlet, an events venue, cabanas, and several food and beverage outlets.

The Beyond the Beach shop to Mandalay Bay, located near the park's entrance, sells surf and WhiteWater World branded merchandise. The shop contains a Kodak photo centre that allows guests to purchase on-ride photos taken on the Super Tubes Hydrocoaster and photographs taken inside the park. Beyond the Beach also serves as the exit gates for the park.

WhiteWater World operates two dining outlets in the peak holiday seasons: Bite Me Cafe and Salty's Kiosk. The widest range of meals is available from the Bite Me Cafe which operates all year round. Salty's Kiosk is located next to The BRO and sells slushies, ice creams and other snack foods. The park also operated the Sandman's Cafe and Bar, which was a licensed bar where guests can purchase alcoholic drinks and food options including Eagle Boys pizza. It is located on the park's western border between the Cave of Waves and the splashdown of The Wedgie.

Since September 2007, WhiteWater World has hosted an undercover events venue, the largest at an Australian theme park, The Shell. The venue can cater for up to 2000 guests and is located on the southeast corner of WhiteWater World.

From April 2011, WhiteWater World has offered guests the hire of 12 luxury cabanas, located around the park. Each cabana is designed for up to four guests, who have access to deck chairs, couches, a coffee table, an iPod dock, towels and a mini refrigerator.

== Reception ==
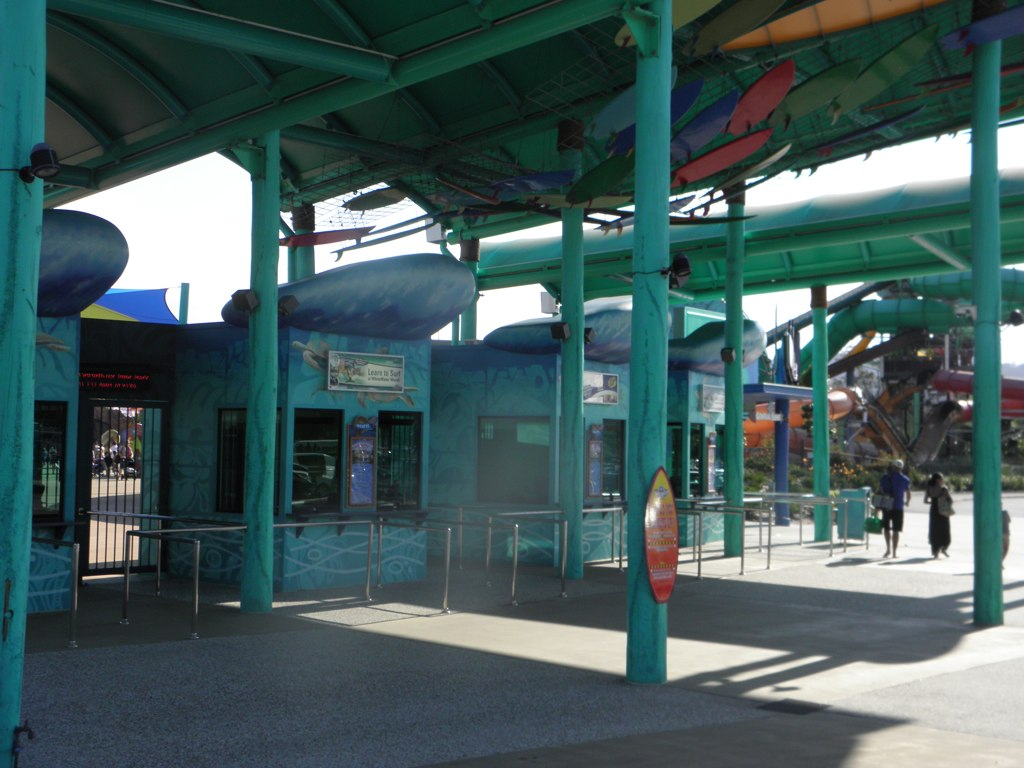
WhiteWater World's main entrance gates showcase the park's Australian beach culture theme.

Prior to opening, WhiteWater World was criticised for being built during one of Australia's worst droughts and in an area on Level 5 water restrictions. When designing WhiteWater World, Macquarie Leisure implemented measures to ensure that the park was one of the most water efficient water parks in the world through the minimisation of water loss.

In October 2008, staff at WhiteWater World stopped Paralympian Steve Simmonds from riding the slides for Universal Studios Singapore. Simmonds was angry and stated that he felt like he was discriminated against. WhiteWater World cited manufacturer guidelines and safety concerns as the reasons behind the restrictions.

During the first full year of operation, WhiteWater World attracted more visitors than the expected 450,000 guests. Attendance records show close to 500,000 guests attended the park during that period.

In a review of several Australian entertainment attractions for The Australian, Scott Podmore rated WhiteWater World 7.5 out of 10, outranking its main competitors Wet'n'Wild Gold Coast and Sea World also on the Gold Coast and UnderWater World on the Sunshine Coast. Podmore stated that "WhiteWater World is a wonderful, diverse park offering something for everyone." and that "WhiteWater World is fantastic for a splash, some R&R or some slippery big rides". Podmore highlighted The Rip, The BRO, Little Rippers and Temple of Huey as the park's top attractions.

Before The Wedgie opened in April 2010, several media reporters experienced the ride. Tanya Westthorp of the Gold Coast Bulletin described the ride as "...not for the faint-hearted". She also stated that "...disorientation prevails for a large chunk of the ride, but the thrill is unparalleled to any other waterslide". Phil Lutton of the Brisbane Times wrote that the ride "...is not only the fastest, most exhilarating water ride I've ever tried but it lives up to its name in spades".

== See also ==
- Dreamworld
- Dreamworld Wildlife Foundation
- SkyPoint Observation Deck
