= ProSlide Technology =

Canadian water ride manufacturer and designer

- Type: Private
- Industry: Manufacturing
- Founded: 1986
- Founder: Richard D. Hunter
- Headquarters: 2650 Queensview Drive; Unit 150; Ottawa, Ontario; K2B 8H6
- Area served: Worldwide
- Products: Water slides
- Number of employees: 100+(2016)
- Website: www.proslide.com

ProSlide Technology, Inc. is a Canadian designer and manufacturer of water rides and water park resorts. They design and manufacture both traditional slides and innovative rides such as water coasters, funnel-shaped Tornado slides, and Bowl slides. ProSlide has received attention for being the first water slide manufacturer to build a water slide using linear induction motors and for designing the Mammoth watercoaster which was named the world's longest watercoaster by Guinness World Records in 2016. Since 1986, ProSlide has developed and designed water rides for water parks in over 40 countries around the world.

== Models ==
Proslide makes a number of different model lines, some in different sizes. The ones in different sizes have names which are the name of the model, followed by a number, indicating the size. Their slide models are:

- Tornado-18, 24, 32, 45 & 60. This consists of a main funnel that riders enter on a raft. This is, as Rick Hunter (president & CEO) says, “a serpentine in run, then we have a funnel experience, then we have a serpentine out run.”
- TornadoWave-45, 60, double TornadoWave 60 & SwitchBack. This model has a raft go down a drop, and up into a large wall, where it falls back and continues along its course.
- Bowl-ProBowl 30, CannonBowl 30 & 40 & BehemothBowl 40 & 60. These have a large bowl which the riders spiral in, before they lose speed and fall into a hole in the middle. The ProBowl is a body slide, and riders exit the bowl through a flat hole in the bottom, where they fall into a deep pool. The Cannon and BehemothBowls are raft slides, so their holes are angled to the side, so the raft can only exit in one direction.
- FlyingSaucer-20, 30, 45 & 60. These consist of large slalom turns which have a large disk in the centre. The theory behind this is the disks will make riders look towards the exit, giving a more interesting experience.
- Water Coaster-HydroMagnetic Rocket, HydroMagnetic Mammoth, RocketBlast, Dueling RocketBlast, Launched Dueling RocketBlast & MammothBlast. These use a method to propel rafts up an incline, after they have either gone down a drop roughly the same height as the incline, or a flat launch section, as to build up speed, as the mechanism that propels the raft only maintains the speed when on an incline. The two methods for propelling the raft is either by using powerful jets that pump water at the raft, pushing it. These can be found on the slides that end with “Blast”, and currently, this is the only method to use a launch, on the Launched Duelling RocketBlast. The other method is found on the slides starting with “HydroMagnetic”, and as the name suggests, it uses magnets underneath the slide to propel magnets underneath the rafts. The magnets are arranged and programmed as “LIMs”, or Linear Induction Motors, like on some rollercoasters. The two main types of raft used are depending on the name of the type of slide. If it has “Rocket” in it, the rafts will have linear seating, with riders in front of each other and all facing forwards, but if it has “Mammoth” in it, then the rafts will be circular, with passengers facing each other.
- Speed Slide-SkyBox, SuperLoop, FreeFall, MultiBump & TurboMammoth. These are in a way faster and usually not as long versions of serpentine slides, and all but the TurboMammoth being body slides. The MultiBump and TurboMammoth usually have the same layout, except the TurboMammoth has round rafts, and the MultiBump, like all other speed slides, is a body slide. The SkyBox is a large box with a transparent trapdoor as the floor, and opens to drop guests into either a FreeFall or SuperLoop, which it can be combined with.
- Serpentine-Twister, Pipeline, Dueling Pipeline & Mammoth. These are what most people think of when they think of slides, as Serpentine slides just consist of one long tube.
- Racer-ProRacer, KrakenRacer, OctopusRacer & RallyRacer. These consist of sections of open slides beside each other, with helixes in between.
- PowerRiver-Similar to a Mammoth, however the slide is more similar to a standard rapids style ride.
- PowerRAPIDS-A newer version of the PowerRiver.
- HIVE-An enclosed helix structure providing high g-force moments. Comes in 3 sizes: HIVE 6, a body slide version, HIVE 20, a one or two-person tube version, and HIVE 35, a family raft version.
- WaterKingdom:
  - Kidz Rides-These are smaller versions of other slide models, with the name of slide it is based on coming after the word ‘Kidz’. These slides are:
    - Twister
    - Pipeline
    - ProRacer
    - OctopusRacer
    - RallyRacer
    - Wave-Smaller version of TornadoWave
    - Bowl
    - Tornado 12
    - Coaster-Smaller version of the RocketBLAST
  - RideHouse

There are also Hybrid slides, which consist of more than one type of slide. For example, Kinnaree at Siam Park is a Hybrid slide of a Tornado 24 and a TornadoWave 60.

== History ==
=== Corporate history ===
After being a member of Canada’s alpine skiing team from 1969 to 1974, Richard D. Hunter founded ProSlide Technology Inc. in 1986. In 1990, Hunter purchased Mont Cascades, a ski area and waterpark in Quebec. Mont Cascades has since served as a research and development area where Proslide tests new ride ideas.

In 2007, ProSlide purchased a 100-acre plot of land in Ottawa where it began development of the Alottawata waterpark. The park was expected to open in the summer of 2019 and would have served in part as a research and development center for the company. In August 2018, however, the park was put on indefinite hold. The land the company purchased for the waterpark was then sold by ProSlide in July 2023.

=== Attraction history ===
ProSlide debuted three types of water slides in 1987, Twisters, Kidz, and Plummets, which are all types of body flumes. The first Twisters opened at Mont Saint-Sauveur in Quebec and Adventure World Theme Park (now known as Six Flags America) in Largo, Maryland, United States; both parks opened 4 Twisters that year. Plummets consist of a vertical drop only, followed by a long, flat segment to help riders decelerate. The first Plummets opened at Aquapar Magog in Quebec and Six Flags America, respectively. ProSlide also debuted their children's water slides (ProSlide Kidz) in 1987, which are miniature versions of Twisters designed for young children. Initially, they were installed more frequently than the full-size Twisters.

In 1989, the company's PIPEline water slides opened at several locations. The Pipeline is a water slide that carries riders on 1-to-3 person inner tubes and is ProSlide's second most common style. The Pipeline has both open and enclosed sections; many have water curtains at the beginning and/or end of their enclosed sections. The first Pipeline rides using inner tubes opened at Fantasia de Agua in the Dominican Republic and Waldameer & Water World in Erie, Pennsylvania. Throughout the 1990s, several large park chains started opening new ProSlide Pipelines, including Cedar Fair, Six Flags, and Wet 'n Wild.

In 1990, the Mammoth waterslide debuted and was the first ProSlide slide that riders rode in four-person tubes. The Mammoth is a larger-scale version of the Pipeline. Kings Island's WaterWorks water park in Mason, Ohio, opened the first ProSlide Mammoth.

The first ProSlide RACER opened in 1994 at ProSlide's Mont Cascades Waterpark in Cantley, Quebec. Racers consist of one wide slide with dividers between the lanes and are designed that riders can "race" to the finish if ride operators send all of them down the slide at the same time.

Beginning in the late 1990s, ProSlide began manufactures four kinds of Bowls: ProBowls, CannonBOWLS, BulletBOWLS, and BehemothBOWLS, all four types consist of an enclosed flume that terminates in a bowl; riders travel in a spiral around the bowl (using centrifugal force to stay on the bowl's wall initially) before dropping into a splashdown pool. ProBowls are enclosed body flumes which end in a bowl with an open top. CannonBowls and the larger BehemothBowls accommodate 2- and 4-person inner tubes, and have a common exit in their centers.

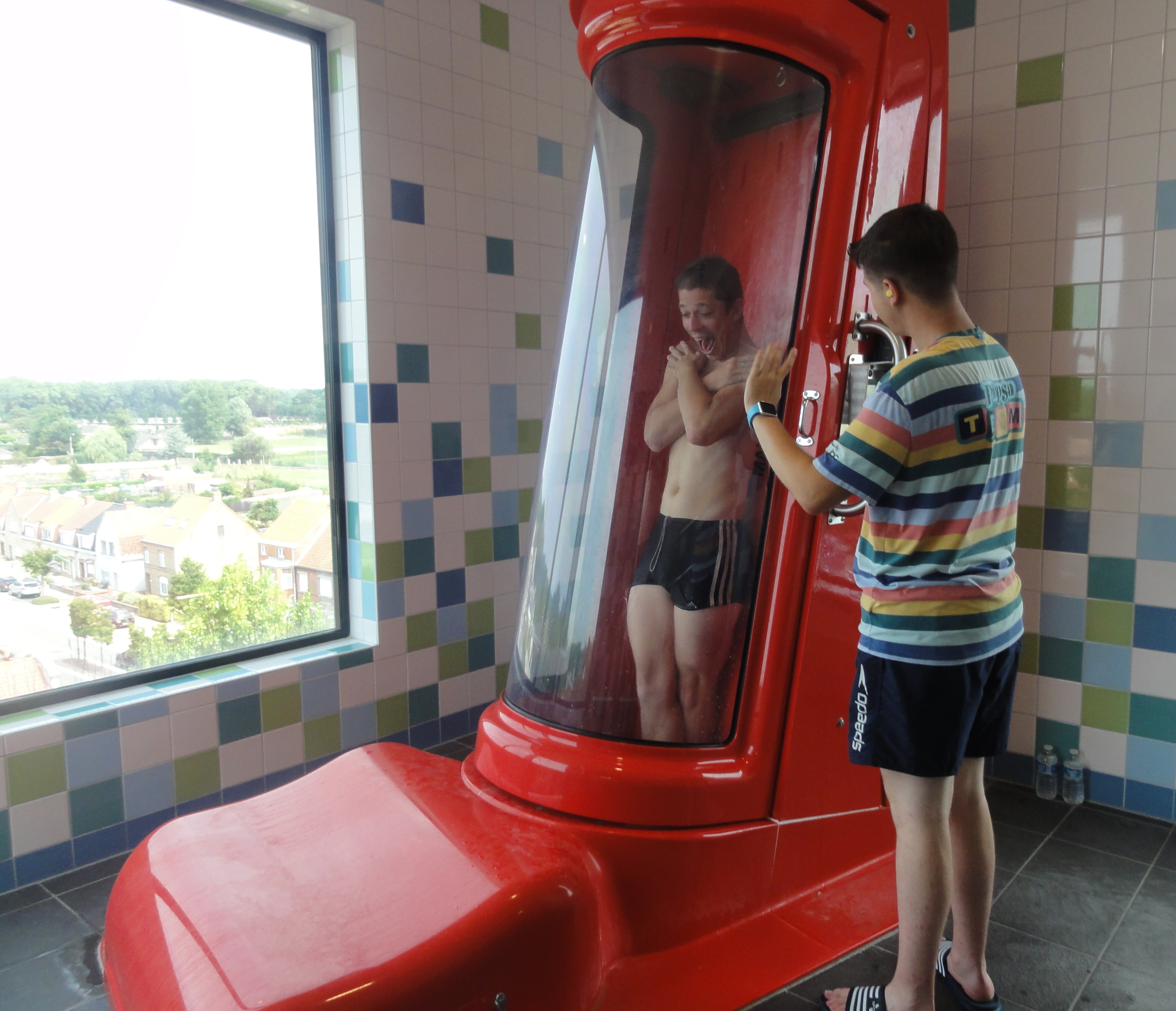
Sky Drop, at Plopsaqua, a slide with SkyBOX.

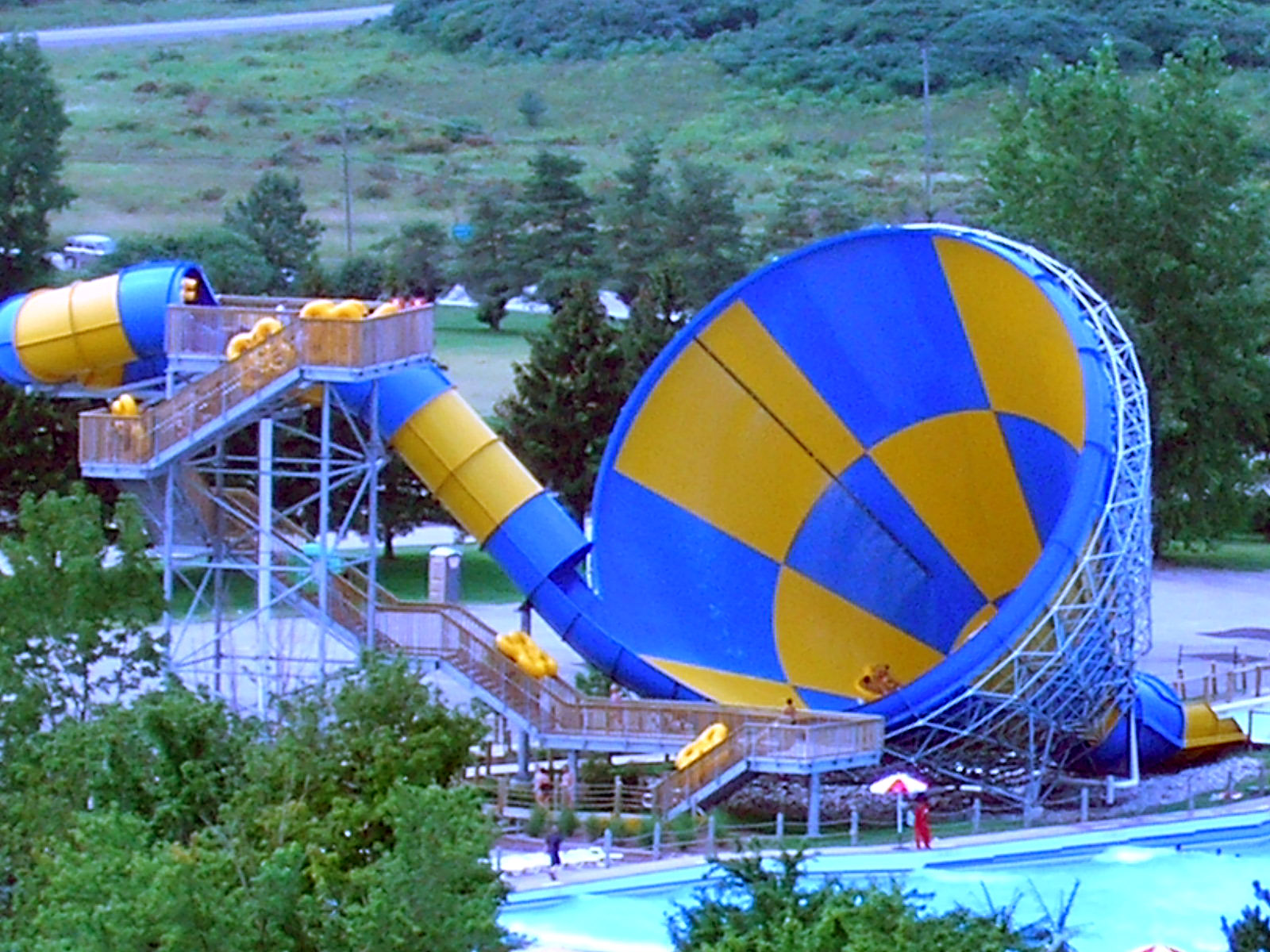
Aerial view of the Tornado at Darien Lake.

The first ProSlide Bowl, a ProBowl, opened at Golfland Sunsplash in 1999.

In the early 2000s, ProSlide gained recognition for its TORNADO, a 4-passenger, 50- to 75-foot-tall enclosed slide which ends in a large, often multicolored funnel. Riders travel back and forth in the funnel several times before exiting into a splashdown pool. The first Tornados opened in 2003 at Six Flags New England, Mountain Creek Waterpark and Holiday World and Splashin' Safari.

In 2005, ProSlide debuted its waterslide version of a roller coaster, the Rocket, an uphill water coaster. Proslide's first Rockets opened at Noah's Ark Water Park, Six Flags New England, and the Great Wolf Lodge.

ProSlide opened a LIM-propelled Rocket at the Great Wolf Lodge near Kings Island in 2006; in 2007, LIM-launched Rockets opened at Naju Lake Waterpark in Korea and at Kentucky Kingdom. Super Tubes Hydrocoaster at WhiteWater World in Australia, have used the ProSlide HydroMagnetics system of Linear Induction Motors placed throughout the ride to launch riders up the uphill sections. HydroMagnetics uses Force Engineering LIM technology, which first gained recognition in the amusement park industry as the power behind launched roller coasters such as Flight of Fear and Speed - The Ride. ProSlide HydroMAGNETIC ROCKETS are the first waterslides to use this same technology, which allows for more flexibility and efficiency in running the waterslides' uphill sections than the previous conveyor-belt system did. In 2012, the company's Mammoth was recognized as the longest water coaster in the world when it opened at Holiday World.

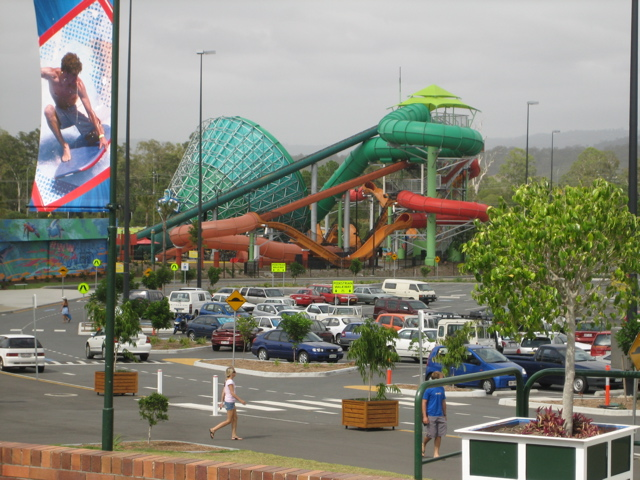
The Super Tubes Hydrocoaster (a LIM-powered ProSlide Rocket) and The Green Room (a ProSlide Tornado) at WhiteWater World.

== Awards and recognition ==
During the early 2000s, ProSlide manufactured the majority of the water park industry's award-winning rides. In 2005, three of the top five Golden Ticket Award winners for Best New Ride for 2005 (Water Park) were rides manufactured by ProSlide. ProSlide also had two of the top three winners for Best Waterpark Ride in 2004, 2005 and 2006. From 2010-2017, ProSlides Wildebeest watercoaster at Holiday World and Splashin' Safari was named Best Waterpark Ride. In 2017, the company earned an additional Golden Ticket Award for Best New Water Park Ride for the Thunder Rapids Water Coaster at Six Flags Fiesta Texas. In 2023, the Water Coaster Rocket Blast at Waldameer & Water World won the Golden Ticket Award for Best New Water Park Ride.

ProSlide is a 15-time IAAPA ‘Best Water Ride’ winner as well as a three-time recipient of IAAPA’s ‘Industry Impact Award,’ given to the top attraction in the entire industry. The company has also won several IAAPA Brass Ring Awards: Best New Product Exhibitor Awards which recognizes the best new product or service in the amusement parks and attractions industry.
