= Fame City Waterworks =

Former American water park

Fame City Waterworks was a water park in western Houston, Texas. It was founded in 1986 by Dari Ansari, who sold it in 1993. It later became known as Adventure Bay, until closing after the summer of 2005.

Attractions included:

- The "Rio Lento": a "lazy river"-style attraction that wound through the northern half of the park.
- The "Gulf Stream": a pair of speed slides.
- The "Master Blaster": a slide that came later in the park's history and would propel guests upward instead of down.
- "Pirates Cove": a play area for younger children.

The Fame City amusement complex also featured a bowling alley, a Ferris wheel, and even served as the location for a music video by Beyonce. The amusement center cost $40 million to open and gave residents on the west part of town an alternative to water parks on the north side of Houston. It was taken over by the Chados Brothers in 1991, after which it was renamed Funplex.
