= National Register of Historic Places listings in Lancaster, Pennsylvania =

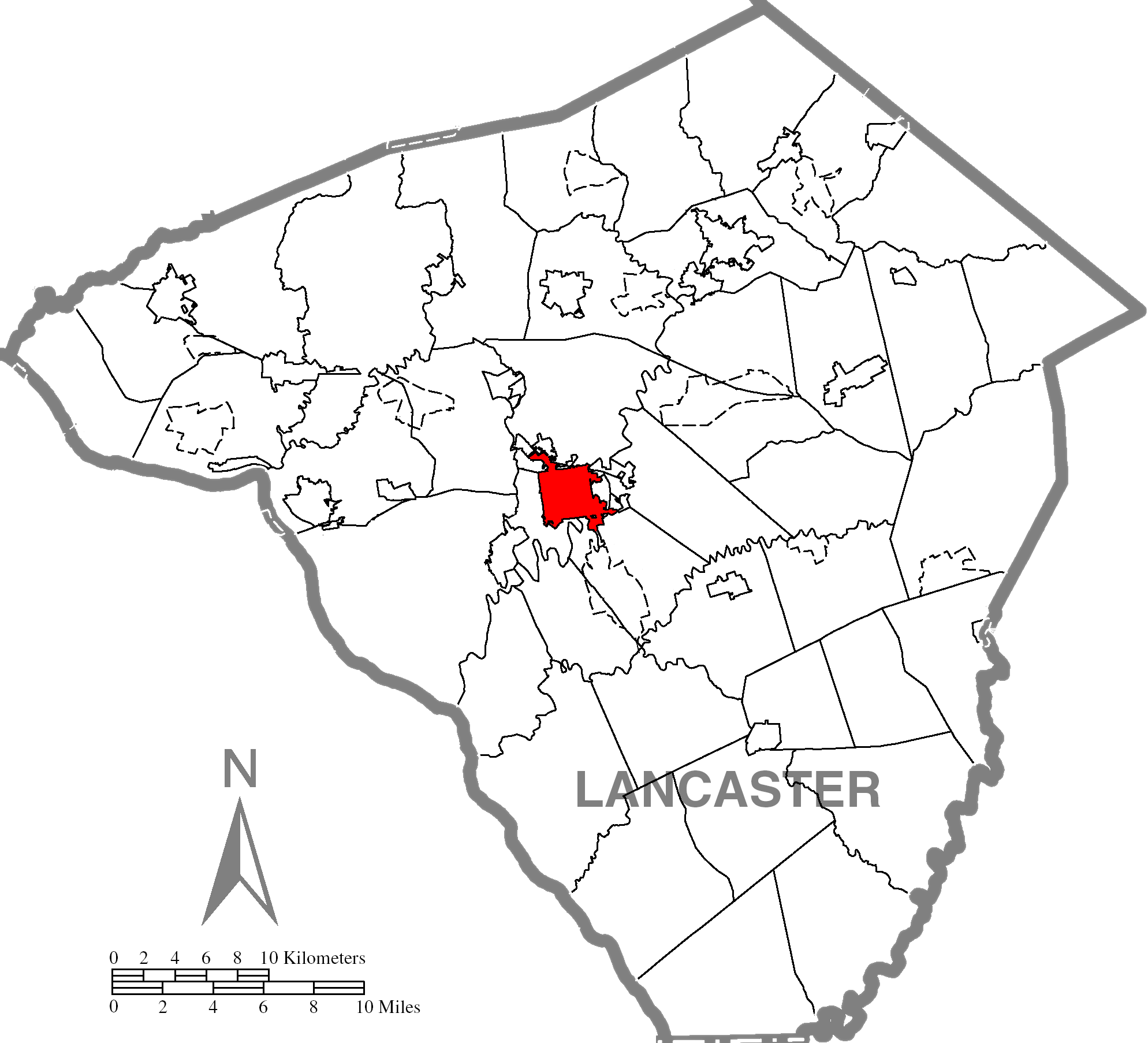
Location of the city of Lancaster in Lancaster County

This is a list of the National Register of Historic Places listings in Lancaster, Pennsylvania.

This is intended to be a complete list of the properties and districts on National Register of Historic Places in the city of Lancaster, Pennsylvania, United States. The locations of National Register properties and districts for which the latitude and longitude coordinates are included below, may be seen in a Google map.

There are 207 properties and districts listed on the National Register in Lancaster County. The city of Lancaster is the location of 57 of these properties and districts; they are listed here, while the 151 properties and districts in the other parts of the county are listed separately. One property straddles the Lancaster city limits and appears on both lists. Another two sites are further designated as National Historic Landmarks. Yet another property was formerly listed but has been removed.

This National Park Service list is complete through NPS recent listings posted May 1, 2026.

== Current listings ==
	Name on the Register	Image	Date listed	Location	Neighborhood	Description
1	American/Consolidated Tobacco Companies	American/Consolidated Tobacco Companies	September 21, 1990 (#90001398)	820-830 North Prince Street; 40°03′01″N 76°18′38″W	Stadium District	
2	B.F. Good & Company Leaf Tobacco Warehouse	B.F. Good & Company Leaf Tobacco Warehouse	January 3, 1985 (#85000035)	49-53 West James Street; 40°02′45″N 76°18′32″W	Stadium District	
3	Basch & Fisher Tobacco Warehouse	Basch & Fisher Tobacco Warehouse	September 21, 1990 (#90001399)	348 New Holland Avenue; 40°02′40″N 76°17′56″W	Musser Park	
4	Jacob Bowman Tobacco Warehouse	Jacob Bowman Tobacco Warehouse	September 21, 1990 (#90001400)	226-230 East Grant Street; 40°02′22″N 76°18′03″W	Musser Park	
5	John Brimmer Tobacco Warehouse	John Brimmer Tobacco Warehouse	September 21, 1990 (#90001390)	226 North Prince Street; 40°02′30″N 76°17′31″W	Chestnut Hill	
6	Central Market	Central Market	July 12, 1972 (#72001127)	William Henry Place, Penn Square; 40°02′18″N 76°18′23″W	Central Business District	
7	Conestoga Cork Works Building	Conestoga Cork Works Building	March 28, 1996 (#96000324)	215-235 East Fulton Street; 40°02′32″N 76°18′04″W	Musser Park	
8	Eisenlohr-Bayuk Tobacco Historic District	Eisenlohr-Bayuk Tobacco Historic District	September 21, 1990 (#90001397)	North Water Street, at West Liberty Street; 40°03′04″N 76°18′43″W	Stadium District	
9	Andrew Ellicott House	Andrew Ellicott House	January 13, 1972 (#72001128)	123 North Prince Street; 40°02′24″N 76°18′29″W	Central Business District	
10	Farmer's Southern Market	Farmer's Southern Market	November 10, 1986 (#86003090)	106 South Queen Street; 40°02′10″N 76°18′20″W	Central Business District	
11	Follmer, Clogg and Company Umbrella Factory	Follmer, Clogg and Company Umbrella Factory	August 21, 1986 (#86001775)	254-260 West King Street; 40°02′14″N 76°18′37″W	Stadium District	
12	Franklin and Marshall College Campus Historic District	Franklin and Marshall College Campus Historic District	November 21, 2003 (#03001190)	College Avenue; 40°02′46″N 76°19′12″W	College Park	
13	Jacob L. Frey Tobacco Warehouse	Jacob L. Frey Tobacco Warehouse	September 21, 1990 (#90001396)	210 West Grant Street; 40°02′18″N 76°18′33″W	Central Business District	
14	Henry B. Friedman Tobacco Warehouse	Henry B. Friedman Tobacco Warehouse	September 21, 1990 (#90001392)	309-311 Harrisburg Avenue, rear 40°02′53″N 76°18′42″W	Stadium District	
15	Fulton Opera House	Fulton Opera House	August 11, 1969 (#69000156)	12-14 North Prince Street; 40°02′17″N 76°18′29″W	Central Business District	
16	Germania Turnverein Building	Germania Turnverein Building	April 10, 1980 (#80003524)	33-35 North Market Street; 40°02′19″N 76°18′24″W	Central Business District	
17	W.W. Griest Building	W.W. Griest Building	June 25, 1999 (#99000755)	8 North Queen Street; 40°02′18″N 76°18′21″W	Central Business District	
18	Hager Building	Hager Building	October 16, 1979 (#79002255)	25 West King Street; 40°02′17″N 76°18′25″W	Central Business District	
19	Hamilton Apartments	Hamilton Apartments	June 28, 1984 (#84003430)	247-249 North Duke Street and 104-118 East Walnut Street; 40°02′34″N 76°18′15″W	Musser Park	
20	Harrisburg Avenue Tobacco Historic District	Harrisburg Avenue Tobacco Historic District	September 21, 1990 (#90001393)	Harrisburg Avenue at North Mulberry Street; 40°02′49″N 76°18′45″W	Stadium District	
21	A.B. Hess Cigar Factory, and Warehouses	A.B. Hess Cigar Factory, and Warehouses	August 24, 1982 (#82003792)	231 North Shippen Street; 40°02′35″N 76°18′00″W	Musser Park	
22	Kirk Johnson Building	Kirk Johnson Building	July 7, 1983 (#83002252)	16-18 West King Street; 40°02′16″N 76°18′23″W	Central Business District	
23	Henry Krauskap House	Henry Krauskap House	October 7, 1982 (#82001539)	301-303½ West King Street; 40°02′15″N 76°18′38″W	Chestnut Hill	
24	Lancaster Armory	Lancaster Armory	November 14, 1991 (#91001699)	438 North Queen Street; 40°02′43″N 76°18′26″W	Ross	
25	Lancaster City Historic District	Lancaster City Historic District	September 7, 2001 (#01000956)	Roughly bounded by Liberty Street, Broad Street, Greenwood Avenue, Race Avenue, 40°02′29″N 76°18′25″W	All neighborhoods	Extends into Manheim Township, elsewhere in Lancaster County
26	Lancaster County Courthouse	Lancaster County Courthouse	November 7, 1978 (#78002415)	43 East King Street; 40°02′19″N 76°18′14″W	Central Business District	
27	Lancaster Crematorium	Lancaster Crematorium	April 14, 1983 (#83002253)	Greenwood Cemetery, 719 Highland Avenue; 40°01′37″N 76°18′02″W	Conestoga Heights	
28	Lancaster Historic District	Lancaster Historic District	November 15, 1979 (#79002256)	Roughly bounded by Howard Avenue, Queen, Church, Duke, Chestnut and Plum Streets; also bounded by East Vine, South Christian, Washington, South Duke, and Church Streets; also King Street; 40°02′10″N 76°18′10″W	Central Business District, Churchtowne, Musser Park and Mussertown	Second and third sets of boundaries represent boundary increases of November 10, 1983 and June 21, 1984 respectively
29	Lancaster Trust Company	Lancaster Trust Company	November 3, 1983 (#83004221)	37-41 North Market Street; 40°02′20″N 76°18′25″W	Central Business District	
30	Lancaster Watch Company	Lancaster Watch Company	August 24, 1982 (#82003793)	901 Columbia Avenue; 40°02′21″N 76°19′29″W	College Park	
31	B.B. Martin Tobacco Warehouse	B.B. Martin Tobacco Warehouse	September 21, 1990 (#90001394)	422-428 North Water Street; 40°02′42″N 76°18′39″W	Stadium District	
32	Edward McGovern Tobacco Warehouse	Edward McGovern Tobacco Warehouse	September 21, 1990 (#90001395)	302-304 North Plum Street; 40°02′36″N 76°17′55″W	Musser Park	
33	David H. Miller Tobacco Warehouse	David H. Miller Tobacco Warehouse	September 21, 1990 (#90001407)	512 North Market Street; 40°02′49″N 76°18′29″W	Stadium District	
34	J.B. Milleysack Cigar Factory	J.B. Milleysack Cigar Factory	September 21, 1990 (#90001401)	820 Columbia Avenue, rear 40°02′15″N 76°19′22″W	West End	
35	William Montgomery House	William Montgomery House	May 18, 2000 (#00000519)	19-21 South Queen Street; 40°02′14″N 76°18′19″W	Central Business District	
36	North Shippen-Tobacco Avenue Historic District	North Shippen-Tobacco Avenue Historic District	September 21, 1990 (#90001402)	Roughly bounded by North Shippen Street, Tobacco Avenue, and East Fulton Street; 40°02′34″N 76°17′57″W	Musser Park	
37	New Era Building	New Era Building	July 14, 1983 (#83002256)	39-41 North Queen Street; 40°02′18″N 76°18′21″W	Central Business District	
38	Nissly-Stauffer Tobacco Warehouses	Nissly-Stauffer Tobacco Warehouses	August 7, 1989 (#89001051)	322-324 North Arch Street and 317-319 North Mulberry Street; 40°02′35″N 76°18′39″W	Chestnut Hill	
39	North Charlotte Street Historic District	North Charlotte Street Historic District	August 31, 1989 (#89001206)	Roughly North Charlotte Street from Harrisburg Pike to West James Street; 40°02′47″N 76°18′52″W	Stadium District	
40	North Prince Street Historic District	North Prince Street Historic District	August 18, 1989 (#89001054)	Roughly North Prince Street and West Lemon Street; 40°02′39″N 76°18′31″W	Central Business and Stadium Districts	
41	Old City Hall	Old City Hall	June 30, 1972 (#72001129)	Penn Square; 40°02′17″N 76°18′23″W	Central Business District	
42	Old Main, Goethean Hall, and Diagnothian Hall	Old Main, Goethean Hall, and Diagnothian Hall	July 30, 1975 (#75001645)	Franklin and Marshall College campus 40°02′43″N 76°19′12″W	College Park	
43	Reilly Brothers and Raub Building	Reilly Brothers and Raub Building	November 3, 1983 (#83004222)	44-46 North Queen Street and 45 North Market Street; 40°02′20″N 76°18′21″W	Central Business District	
44	R.K. Schnader & Sons Tobacco Warehouse	R.K. Schnader & Sons Tobacco Warehouse	September 21, 1990 (#90001404)	437-439 West Grant Street; 40°02′16″N 76°18′54″W	Chestnut Hill	
45	Walter Schnader Tobacco Warehouse	Walter Schnader Tobacco Warehouse	September 21, 1990 (#90001391)	417-419 West Grant Street; 40°02′17″N 76°18′50″W	Chestnut Hill	
46	L.G. Sherman Tobacco Warehouse	L.G. Sherman Tobacco Warehouse	September 21, 1990 (#90001405)	602 East Marion Street; 40°02′29″N 76°17′36″W	East Side	
47	Slater Cigar Company	Slater Cigar Company	September 21, 1990 (#90001403)	625 and 626-628 Columbia Avenue; 40°02′16″N 76°19′04″W	Chestnut Hill and West End	
48	Soldiers and Sailors Monument	Soldiers and Sailors Monument	April 2, 1973 (#73001635)	Penn Square; 40°02′16″N 76°18′21″W	Central Business District	
49	Sprenger Brewery	Sprenger Brewery	November 27, 1979 (#79002257)	125-131 East King Street; 40°02′18″N 76°18′10″W	Central Business District	
50	Steinman Hardware Store	Steinman Hardware Store	October 18, 1979 (#79002258)	26-28 West King Street; 40°02′13″N 76°18′21″W	Central Business District	
51	Stevens High School	Stevens High School	June 30, 1983 (#83002257)	West Chestnut and Charlotte Streets; 40°02′27″N 76°18′46″W	Chestnut Hill	
52	Teller Brothers-Reed Tobacco Historic District	Teller Brothers-Reed Tobacco Historic District	September 21, 1990 (#90001406)	North Prince Street, 200 block, east side 40°02′30″N 76°18′30″W	Central Business District	
53	U.S. Post Office	U.S. Post Office	July 23, 1981 (#81000545)	50 West Chestnut Street; 40°02′26″N 76°18′28″W	Central Business District	
54	Charlie Wagner's Cafe	Charlie Wagner's Cafe	December 29, 1983 (#83004223)	40 East Grant Street; 40°02′20″N 76°18′21″W	Central Business District	
55	West Lawn	West Lawn	May 3, 1984 (#84003453)	407 West Chestnut Street; 40°02′26″N 76°18′49″W	Chestnut Hill	
56	Woodward Hill Cemetery	Woodward Hill Cemetery	February 24, 2005 (#05000098)	Bounded by Strawberry Street, South Queen Street, and Chesapeake Street; 40°01′45″N 76°18′07″W	Churchtowne	
57	Jasper Yeates House	Jasper Yeates House	September 23, 1982 (#82003794)	24 South Queen Street; 40°02′14″N 76°18′21″W	Central Business District	

== Former listing ==
	Name on the Register	Image	Date listed	Date removed	Location	City or town	Description
1	Watt and Shand Department Store	Watt and Shand Department Store	March 12, 1999 (#99000322)	October 11, 2007	2-12 E. King St., 23-27 Penn Sq., 1-21 S. Queen St., 18-24 S. Christian St.	Central Business District	All but the front facade were demolished in August 2006.
