= Jacob Frey (disambiguation) =

Jacob Frey (born 1981) is an American politician.

Jacob or Jakob Frey may also refer to:

- Jakob Frey (1824–1875), Swiss writer
- Johann Jakob Frey the Elder (1681–1752), Swiss engraver

== See also ==
- Jacob Fry Jr. (1802–1866), American politician
- Jacob Frye, video game character
- Jacob L. Frey Tobacco Warehouse, historic tobacco warehouse in Lancaster County, Pennsylvania
