= West Lawn =

West Lawn may refer to a place in the United States:

- West Lawn, Chicago, Illinois, a neighborhood
- West Lawn, Pennsylvania, a former borough and current census-designated place
- West Lawn (Lancaster, Pennsylvania), a historic home
