= Northwest Corridor =

Northwest Corridor may refer to:

- Northwest Corridor, part of Interstate 75 in Georgia
- Northwest Corridor (Lancaster), a neighborhood in Lancaster, Pennsylvania, USA
- Northwest Corridor, former name of the Metro Blue Line Extension (Minnesota)
- Northwest Corridor HOV/BRT, a reversible-lane widening of Interstate 75 in northwestern metro Atlanta

== See also ==
- North–West line (disambiguation)
