= Eisenlohr =

Eisenlohr is a surname. Notable people with the surname include:

- August Eisenlohr (1832–1902), German Egyptologist
- Friedrich Eisenlohr (1805–1854), German architect and university professor
- Ulrich Eisenlohr (born 1950), German classical pianist

== See also ==
- Eisenlohr–Bayuk Tobacco Historic District, historic tobacco warehouse complex and national historic district located at Lancaster, Lancaster County, Pennsylvania
