= Slater Building =

Slater Building may refer to:

- Slater Building (Worcester, Massachusetts), listed on the NRHP in Massachusetts
- Slater Building (La Grande, Oregon), listed on the NRHP in Oregon

== See also ==
- Slater Cigar Company buildings, listed on the NRHP in Lancaster County, Pennsylvania
