= L. G. Sherman Tobacco Warehouse =

- U.S. National Register of Historic Places
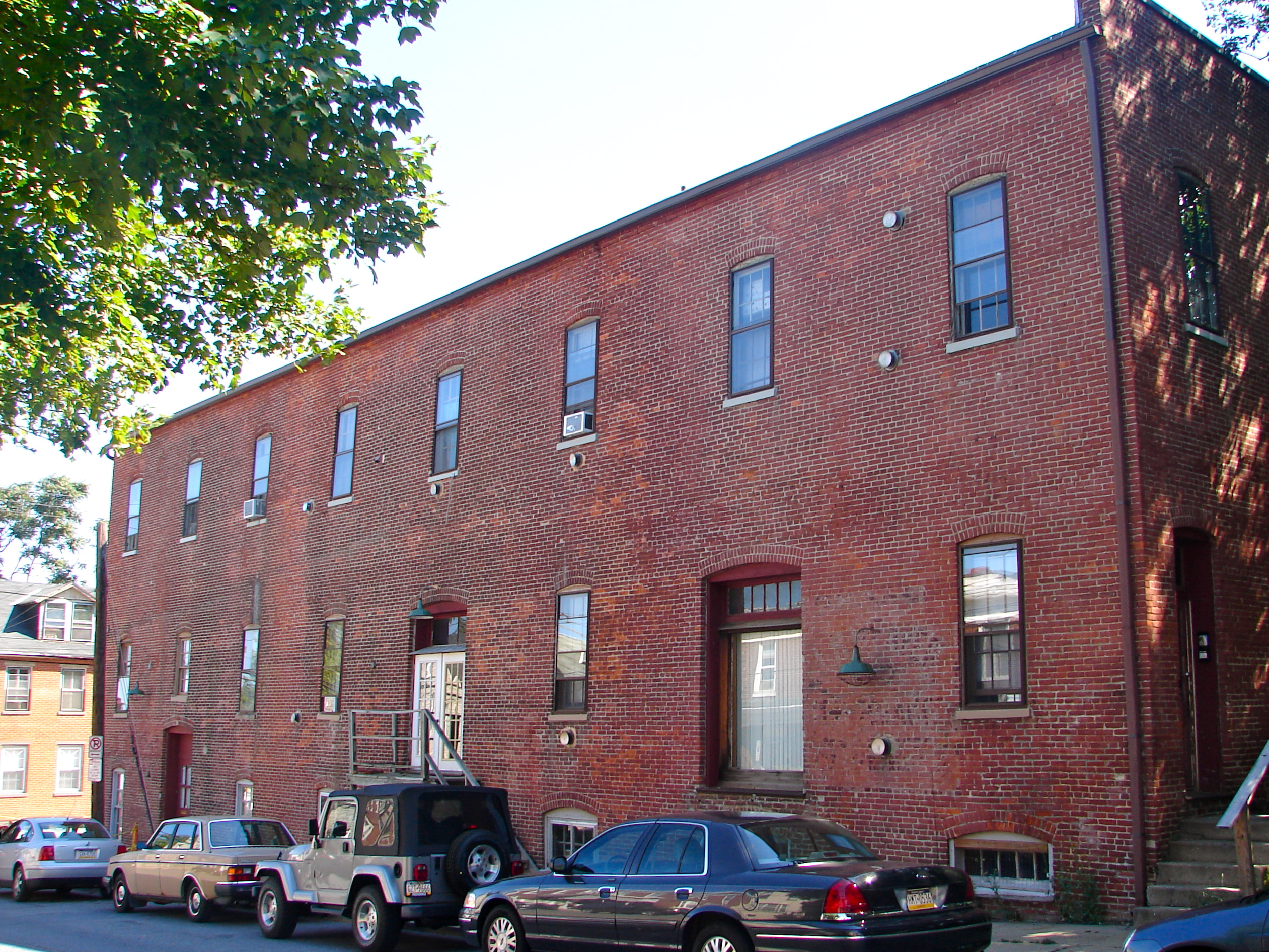
- L. G. Sherman Tobacco Warehouse, August 2011

- Location within Pennsylvania Location within the United States
- Location: 602 E. Marion St., Lancaster, Pennsylvania
- Coordinates: 40°2′29″N 76°17′37″W
- Area: less than one acre
- Built: c. 1900
- MPS: Tobacco Buildings in Lancaster City MPS
- NRHP reference No.: 90001405
- Added to NRHP: September 21, 1990

The L. G. Sherman Tobacco Warehouse is an historic tobacco warehouse in Lancaster, Lancaster County, Pennsylvania, United States.

It was listed on the National Register of Historic Places in 1990.

== History and architectural features ==
Built circa 1900, this historic structure is a two-story, rectangular, brick building with a high basement. It is eight bays wide by two bays and has a flat roof. It is situated a few doors away from the R. K. Schnader & Sons Tobacco Warehouse.
