= Lancaster Brewing Company =

Brewer

- Step Up To Better Beer

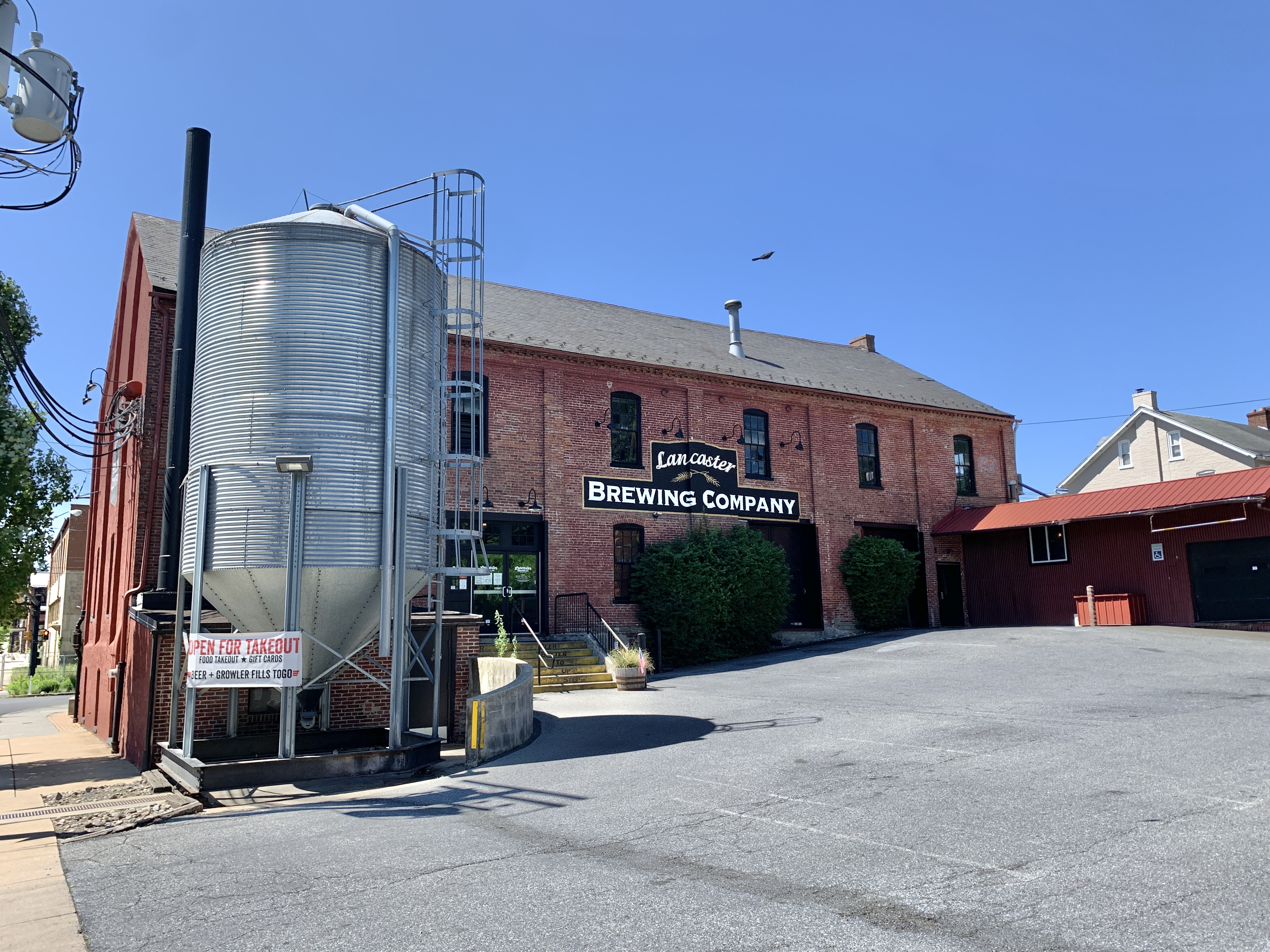
- Interactive map of Lancaster Brewing Company
- Location: 302 N. Plum St, Lancaster, Pennsylvania; United States
- Opened: 1995
- Owner: Peter Keares and Nick Keares
- Website: www.lancasterbrewing.com

Active beers
Double Chocolate Milk Stout; Hop Hog IPA; Strawberry Wheat Ale; Milk Stout; Haze Farmer IPA; Shoo Fly Pie Porter; Winter Warmer; Etc.
Name	Type

Seasonal beers
Baked Pumpkin Ale; Blue Trail Shandy; Imperial Jo Espresso Stout; Lancaster Oktoberfest
Name	Type

Other beers
Barrel Aged Series; Twin Hop Series
Name	Type

The Lancaster Brewing Company is an American brewery, restaurant and distillery business located in Lancaster, Pennsylvania.

== History ==
Founded in 1995, the brewery and the restaurant are located in the Edward McGovern Tobacco Warehouse, which was listed on the National Register of Historic Places in 1990. In 2024, Lancaster Craft Spirits, a whiskey distillery was added to the business.

The brewery has produced more than two hundred different beers since 1995. Its products are sold throughout the Mid-Atlantic region, with distribution in Pennsylvania, New Jersey, New York, Washington, D.C., Delaware, Maryland and Virginia.

The grain to glass distillery produces American single malt whiskey, bourbon, hop infused gin, rum and vodka.

== Gallery ==
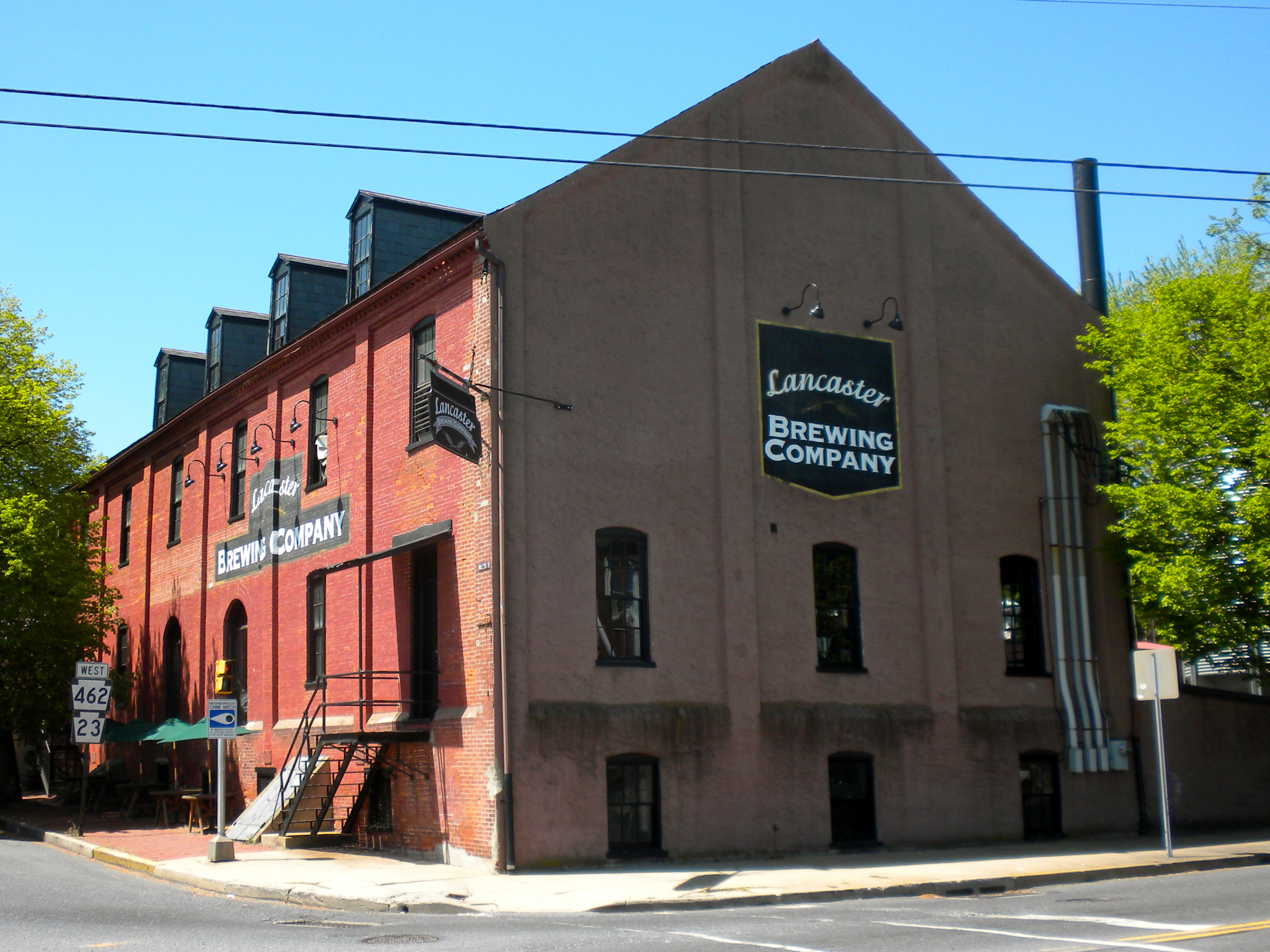
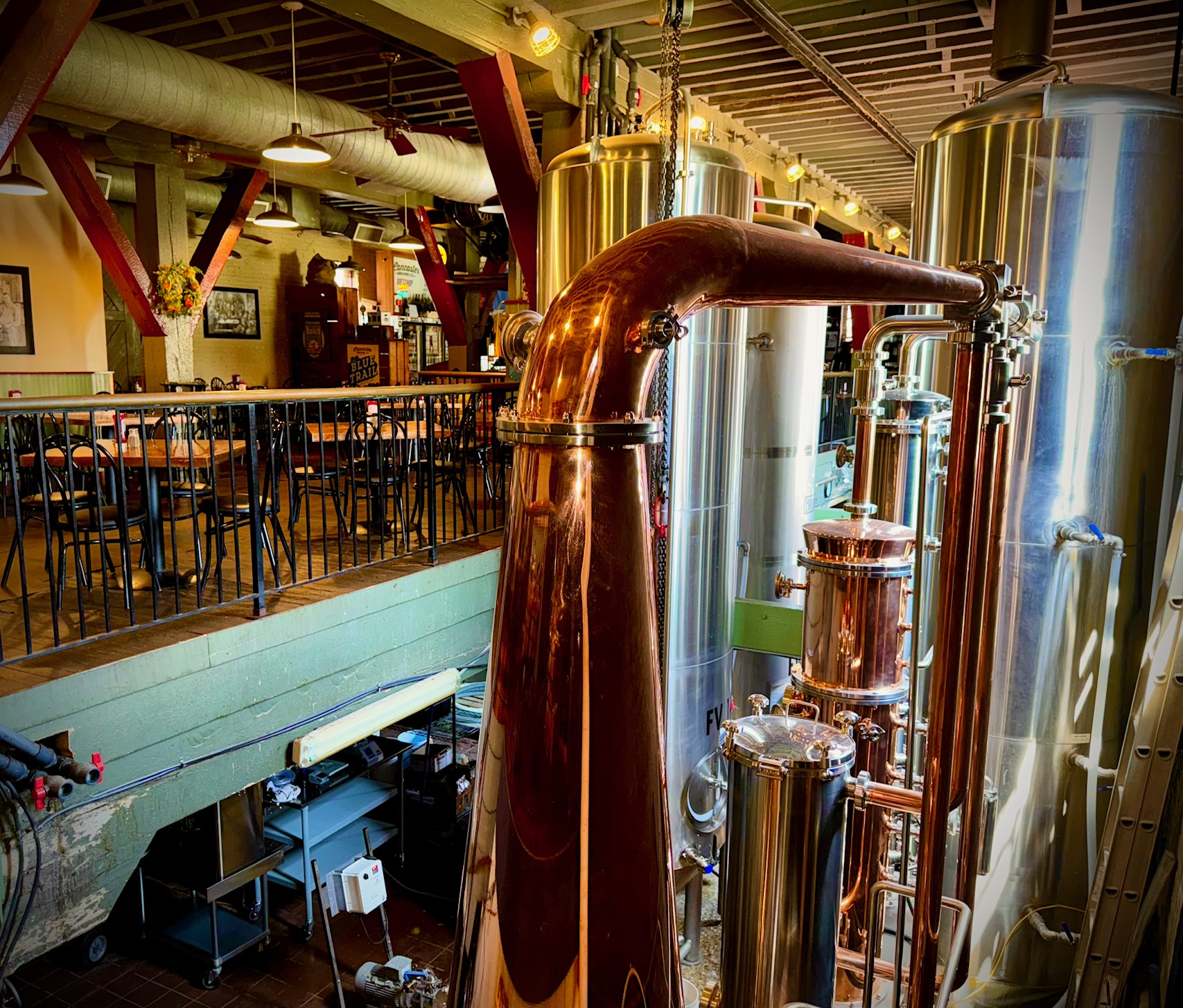
Newly added pot still and dining area Lancaster Craft Bourbon and American Single Malt 6 year whiskey
The brewery is housed in the McGovern Tobacco Warehouse, which is listed by the National Register of Historic Places

== See also ==
- Beer in the United States
