= North–West line =

Northwest Line or North West Line or North-West Railway or similar may refer to:

== Asia ==
- North-West Railway, official name of Light Rail (MTR), Hong Kong

== Europe ==
- Northwest railway line, Austria and Czech Republic
- Northwest Line (Denmark)

== North America ==
- Northwest Line (C-Train), Calgary, Canada
- Northwest Rail Line, name used during construction of the B Line (RTD), Denver, United States
- Union Pacific Northwest Line, Metra commuter rail line, United States

== Oceania ==
- M1 Metro North West & Bankstown Line, Sydney, Australia
  - Sydney Metro Northwest, the associated construction project

== See also ==
- Northwest Corridor (disambiguation)
