= B. B. Martin Tobacco Warehouse =

- U.S. National Register of Historic Places
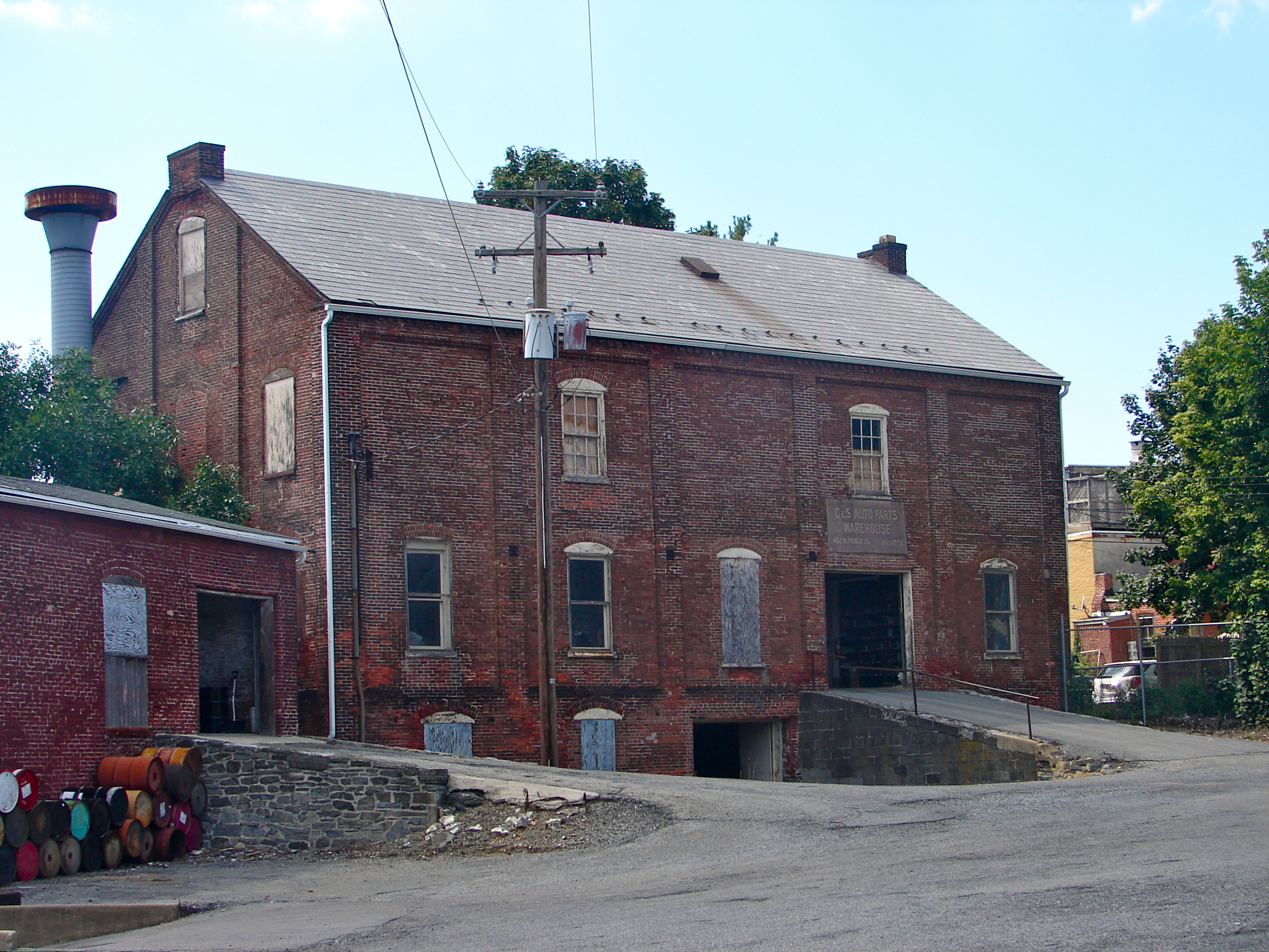
- B. B. Martin Tobacco Warehouse, August 2011

- Location within Pennsylvania Location within the United States
- Location: 422–428 N. Water St., Lancaster, Pennsylvania
- Coordinates: 40°2′42″N 76°18′39″W
- Area: less than one acre
- Built: c. 1875
- MPS: Tobacco Buildings in Lancaster City MPS
- NRHP reference No.: 90001394
- Added to NRHP: September 21, 1990

B. B. Martin Tobacco Warehouse is a historic tobacco warehouse located at Lancaster, Lancaster County, Pennsylvania. It was built about 1875, and is a 2 1/2-story, red brick building on a stone foundation. It is five bays by three bays and has a moderate pitched slate covered gable roof.

It was listed on the National Register of Historic Places in 1990.
