= Nissly-Stauffer Tobacco Warehouses =

- U.S. National Register of Historic Places
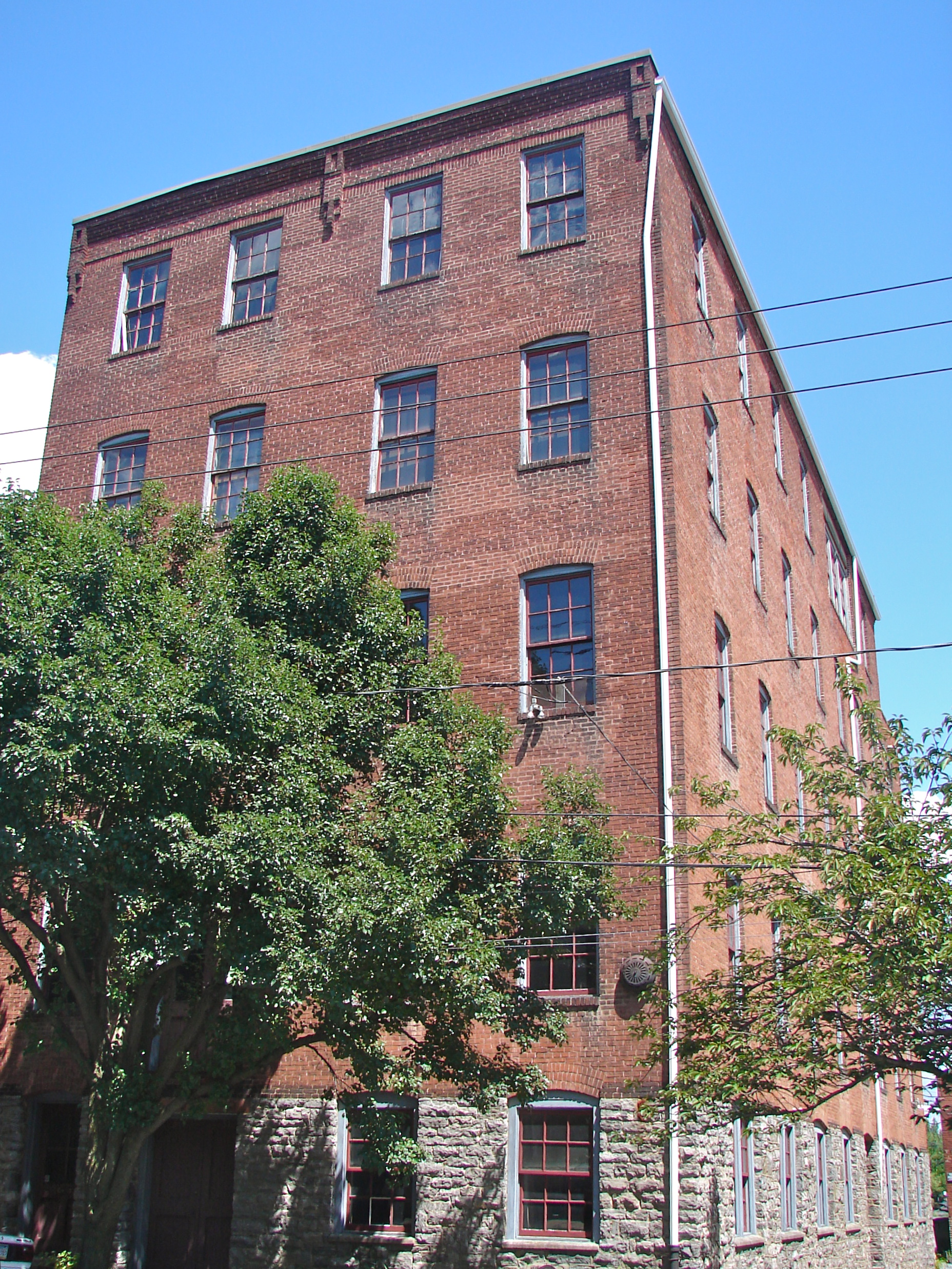
- Stauffer Tobacco Warehouse, August 2011

- Location within Pennsylvania Location within the United States
- Location: 322-324 N. Arch St. and 317-319 N. Mulberry St., Lancaster, Pennsylvania
- Coordinates: 40°2′35″N 76°18′40″W
- Area: 0.3 acres (0.12 ha)
- Built: c. 1912-1913
- Built by: Bally, Samuel H.
- NRHP reference No.: 89001051
- Added to NRHP: August 7, 1989

Nissly-Stauffer Tobacco Warehouses are two historic tobacco warehouses located at Lancaster, Lancaster County, Pennsylvania. The Nissly Warehouse was built about 1912, and is a three-story, rectangular brick building on a limestone foundation. It is seven bays by six bays. The Stauffer Warehouse was built about 1913, and is a five-story, rectangular brick building on a limestone foundation. It is four bays by eight bays.

It was listed on the National Register of Historic Places in 1989.
