= North Charlotte Street Historic District =

Historic district in Pennsylvania, United States

- U.S. National Register of Historic Places
- U.S. Historic district
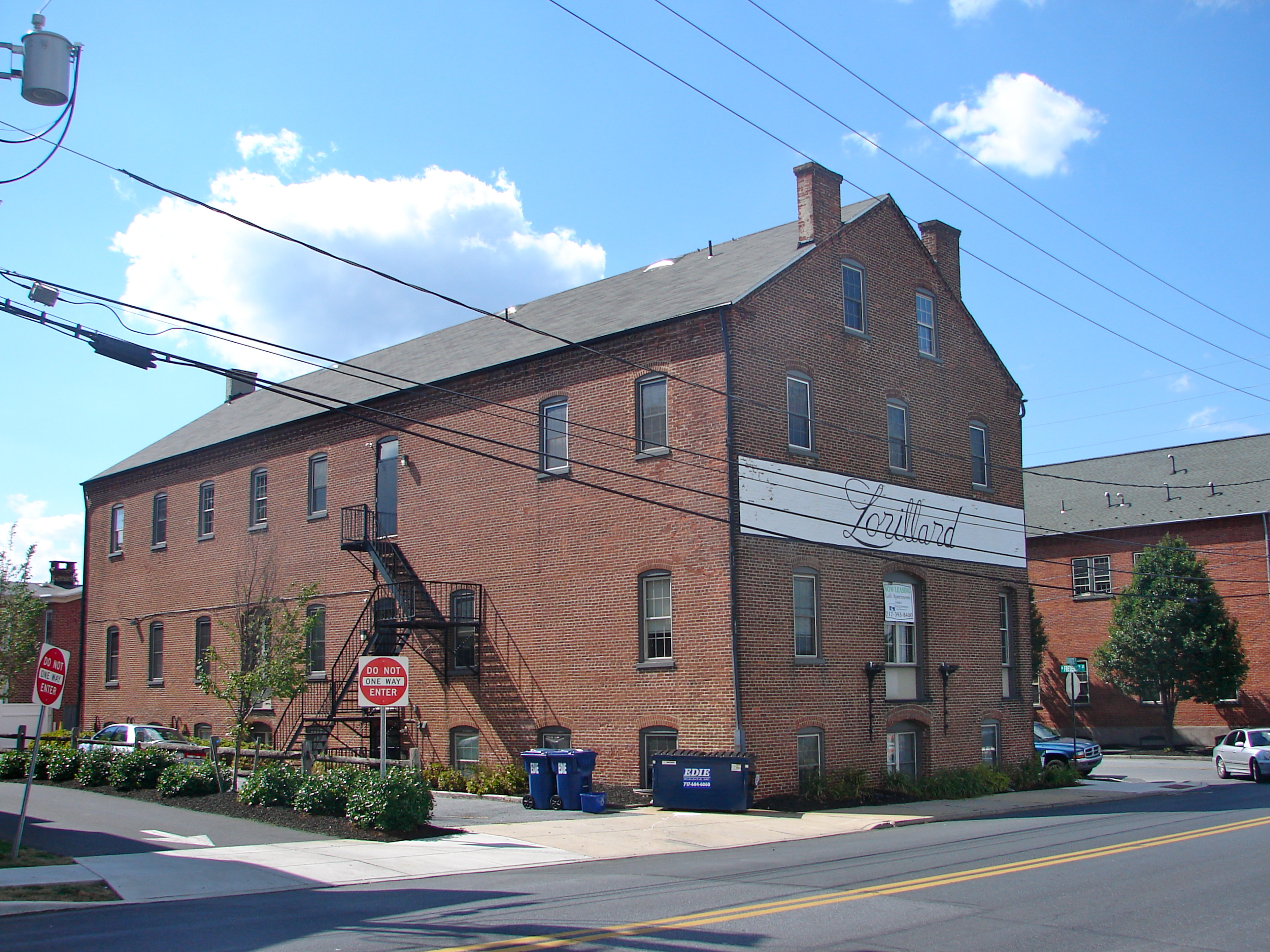
- North Charlotte Street Historic District, August 2011

- Location within Pennsylvania Location within the United States
- Location: Roughly N. Charlotte St. from Harrisburg Pike to W. James St., Lancaster, Pennsylvania
- Coordinates: 40°2′47″N 76°18′52″W
- Area: 2.8 acres (1.1 ha)
- Architectural style: Colonial Revival
- NRHP reference No.: 89001206
- Added to NRHP: August 31, 1989

The North Charlotte Street Historic District is an historic, tobacco warehouse complex and national historic district in Lancaster, Lancaster County, Pennsylvania, United States.

It was listed on the National Register of Historic Places in 1989.

== History and architectural features ==
This district encompasses ten contributing buildings, which were built roughly between 1876 and 1920. Six of the buildings were built circa 1876 by John DeHaven. The remaining buildings are the C.G. Schubert Tobacco Warehouse (c. 1880, c. 1920), the Henry Martin Brick Machine Company (two buildings, 1893 and c. 1897), and the General Cigar Company (c. 1917). All ten structures are brick buildings, two are 4 1/2 stories tall, and eight of the ten were used for the processing and storage of cigar leaf tobacco. Some exhibit Colonial Revival-style details.
