= Edward McGovern Tobacco Warehouse =

- U.S. National Register of Historic Places
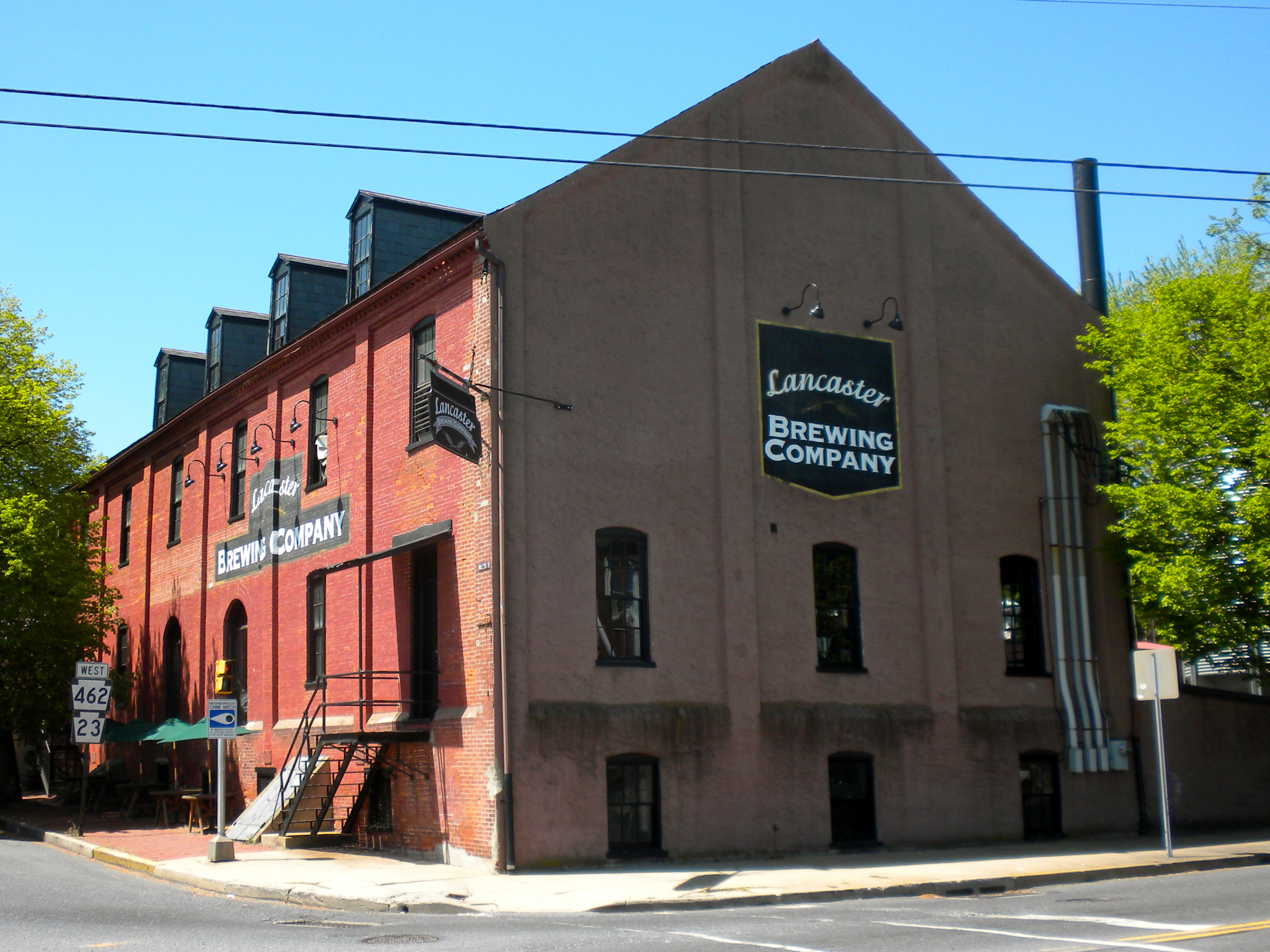
- McGovern Warehouse, April 2010

- Location within Pennsylvania Location within the United States
- Location: 302-304 N. Plum St., Lancaster, Pennsylvania
- Coordinates: 40°2′36″N 76°17′55″W
- Area: less than one acre
- Built: c. 1880
- Architectural style: Tobacco Warehouse
- MPS: Tobacco Buildings in Lancaster City MPS
- NRHP reference No.: 90001395
- Added to NRHP: September 21, 1990

Edward McGovern Tobacco Warehouse is a historic tobacco warehouse located at Lancaster, Lancaster County, Pennsylvania. It was built about 1880, and is a 2 1/2-story, red brick building. It is six bays by three bays and has a moderate pitched slate covered gable roof with gabled dormers. Additions were made with the building about 1910 and about 1939. The building houses the Lancaster Brewing Company restaurant.

It was listed on the National Register of Historic Places in 1990.
