= New Era Building (Lancaster, Pennsylvania) =

- U.S. National Register of Historic Places
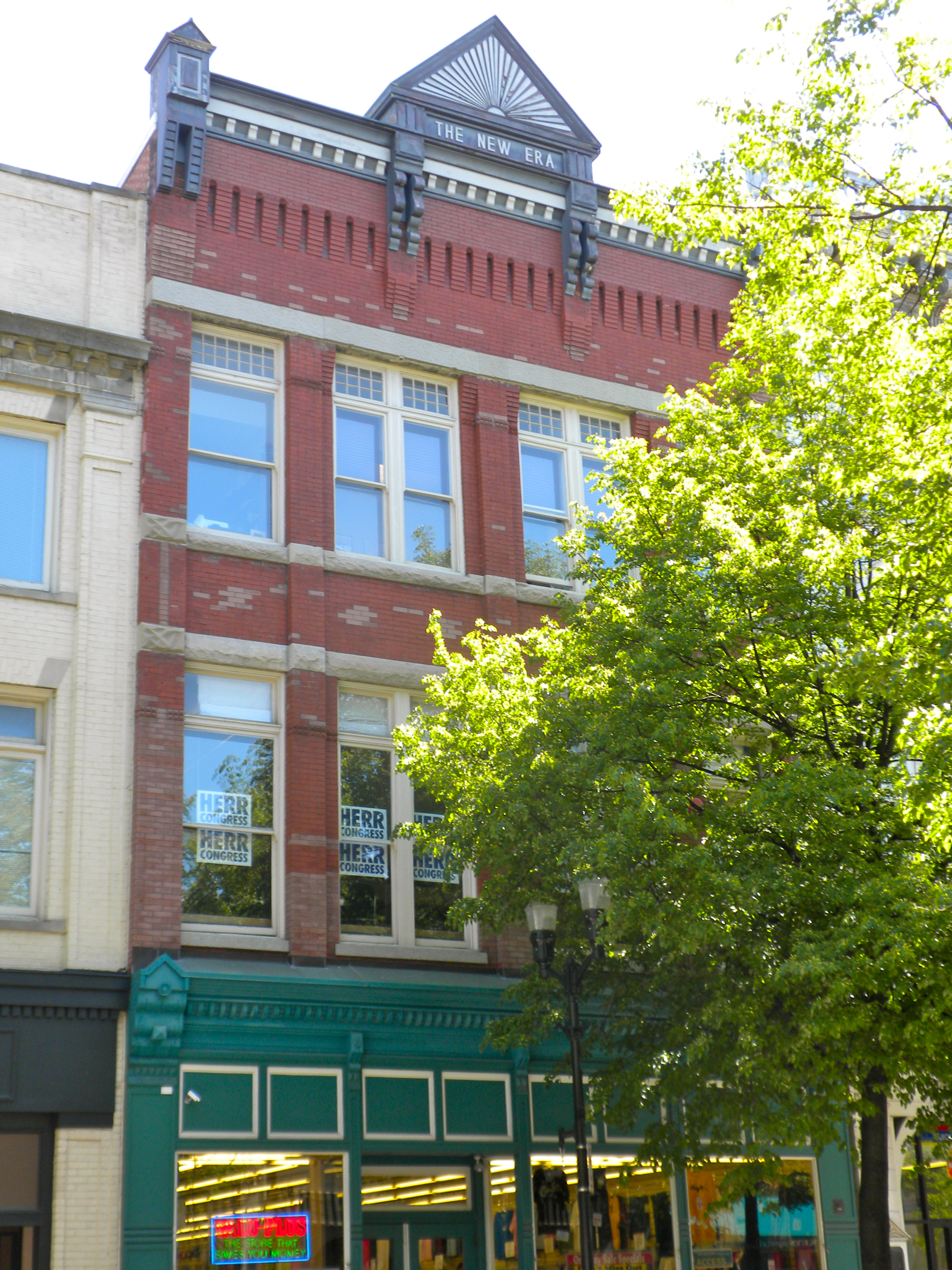
- New Era Building, April 2010

- Location within Pennsylvania Location within the United States
- Location: 39-41 N. Queen St., Lancaster, Pennsylvania
- Coordinates: 40°2′18″N 76°18′21″W
- Area: 0.2 acres (0.081 ha)
- Built: 1890
- Architect: Burger, J. Adam
- Architectural style: Queen Anne
- NRHP reference No.: 83002256
- Added to NRHP: July 14, 1983

The New Era Building is an historic commercial and industrial building that is located in Lancaster, Lancaster County, Pennsylvania, United States.

It was listed on the National Register of Historic Places in 1983.

== History and architectural features ==
This historic structure is a three-story, L-shaped, brick building that was designed in the Queen Anne style. The original section was built between 1890 and 1891. The rear section was expanded in 1900, 1903, and 1914 to accommodate the growing printing company. It originally housed the New Era newspaper and printing company. A number of notable academic journals and books were printed here between 1893 and 1922, including Popular Science Monthly and the Journal of Negro History. When listed in 1983, it was occupied by a Rite Aid drug store.
