= Conestoga Cork Works Building =

- U.S. National Register of Historic Places
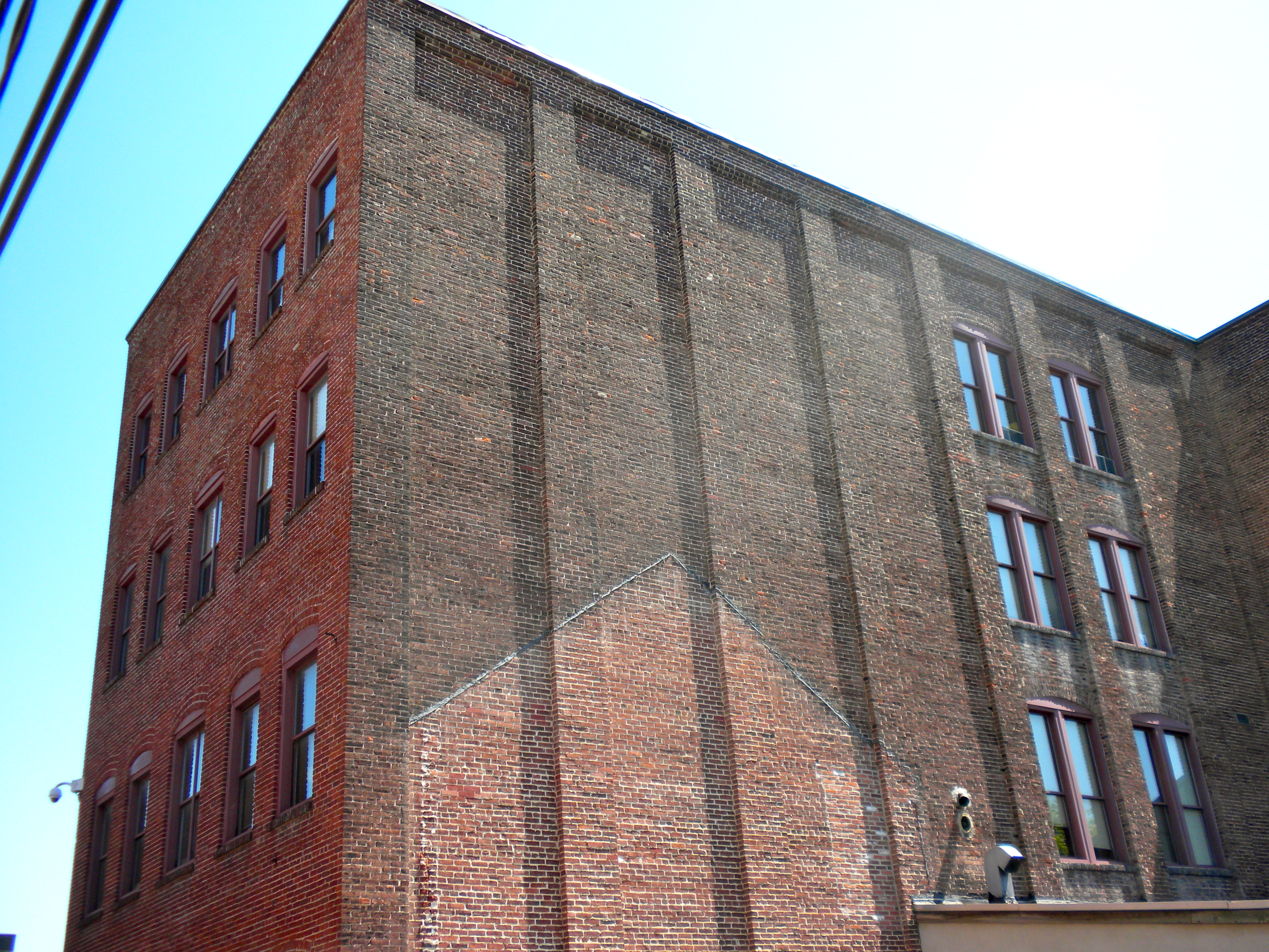
- Conestoga Cork Works Building, April 2010

- Location within Pennsylvania Location within the United States
- Location: 215–235 E. Fulton St., Lancaster, Pennsylvania
- Coordinates: 40°2′32″N 76°18′4″W
- Area: 2 acres (0.81 ha)
- Built: c. 1883–1897
- Architectural style: Late 19th-century industrial
- MPS: Tobacco Buildings in Lancaster City MPS
- NRHP reference No.: 96000324
- Added to NRHP: March 28, 1996

Conestoga Cork Works Building, also known as E. Rosenwald & Co. Tobacco Warehouse, Rose Bros. & Co., Farmers Supply, and Rosenwald Court Apartments, is a historic factory and tobacco warehouse located at Lancaster, Lancaster County, Pennsylvania. It was built between about 1883 and 1897, and is a three-story, 31 bay brick building with a hipped and gabled roof. It has a stuccoed limestone foundation. The building was used as a cork cutting factory until 1912, a tobacco warehouse until the 1960s, then converted to apartments in 1992.

It was listed on the National Register of Historic Places in 1996.
