= Henry B. Friedman Tobacco Warehouse =

- U.S. National Register of Historic Places
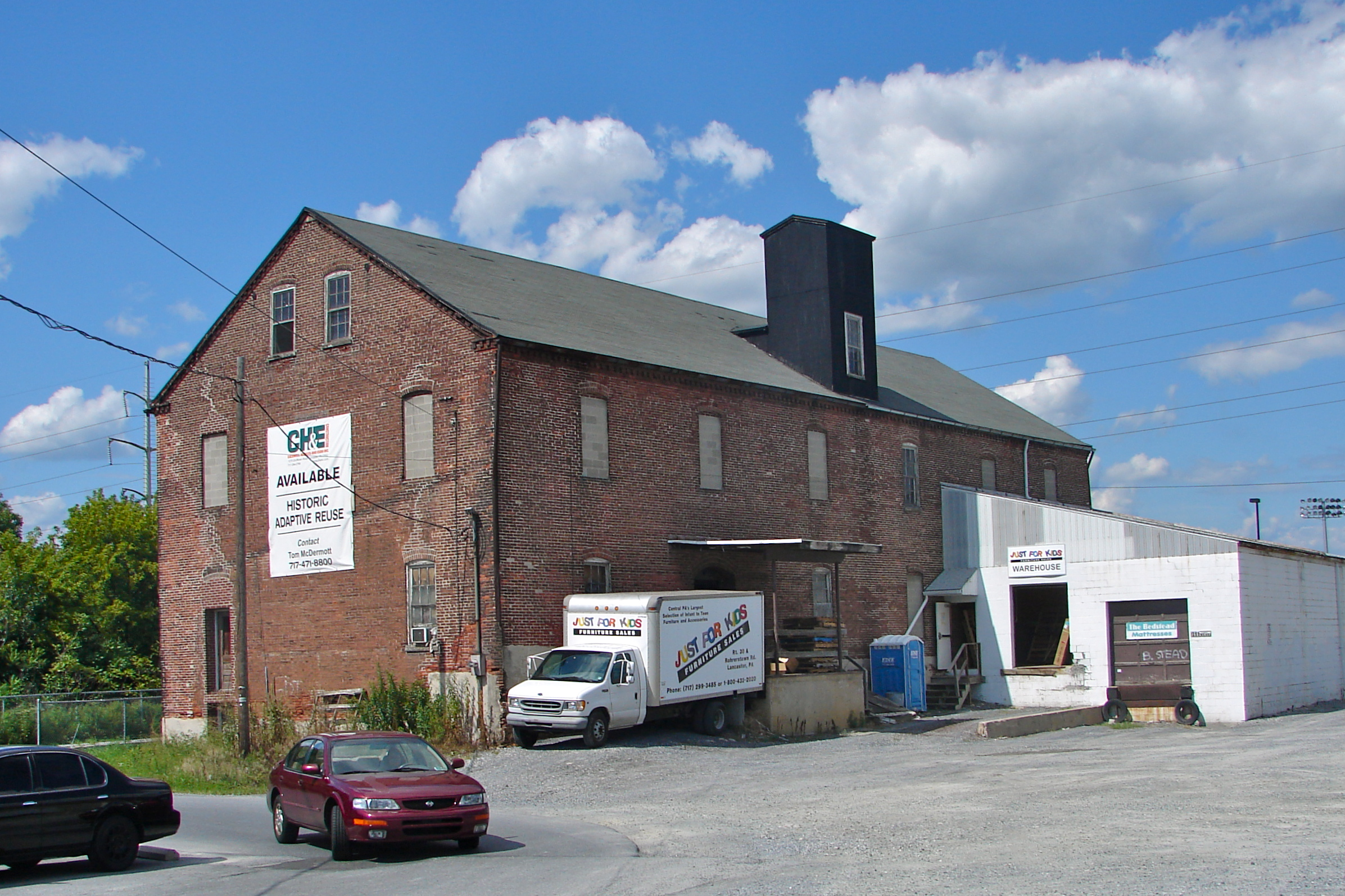
- Henry B. Friedman Tobacco Warehouse, August 2011

- Location within Pennsylvania Location within the United States
- Location: 309–311 Harrisburg Ave., Lancaster, Pennsylvania
- Coordinates: 40°2′52″N 76°18′45″W
- Area: less than one acre
- Built: 1880
- MPS: Tobacco Buildings in Lancaster City MPS
- NRHP reference No.: 90001392
- Added to NRHP: September 21, 1990

The Henry B. Friedman Tobacco Warehouse is an historic tobacco warehouse in Lancaster, Lancaster County, Pennsylvania, United States.

It was listed on the National Register of Historic Places in 1990.

== History and architectural features ==
This historic structure was built circa 1880, and is a 2 1/2-story, rectangular, brick building with a raised basement and stucco-covered stone foundation. It has a moderately-pitched gable roof. It is three bays wide and six bays deep.
