= Walter Schnader Tobacco Warehouse =

- U.S. National Register of Historic Places
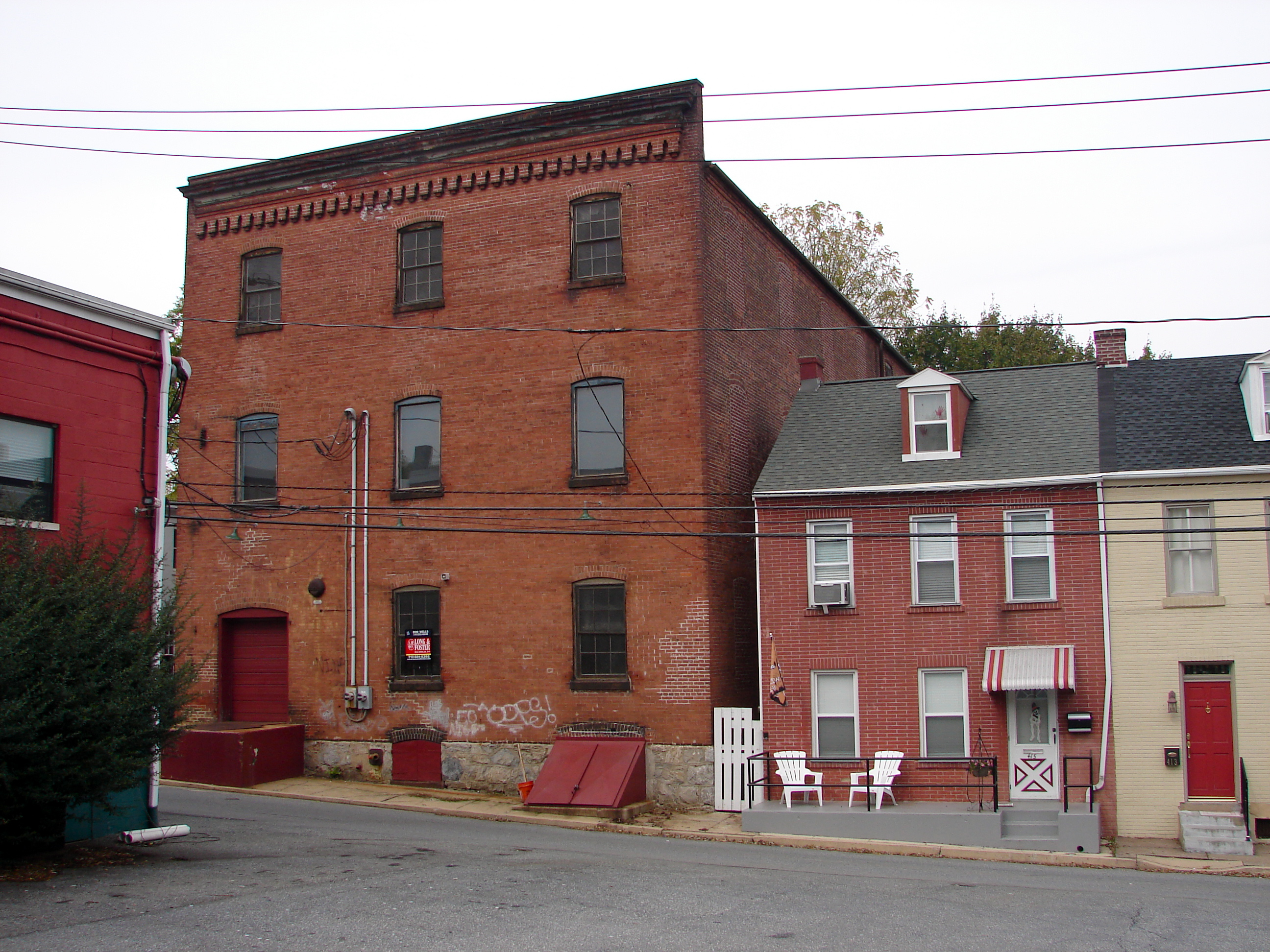
- Walter Schnader Tobacco Warehouse, October 2010

- Location within Pennsylvania Location within the United States
- Location: 417–419 W. Grant St., Lancaster, Pennsylvania
- Coordinates: 40°2′17″N 76°18′50″W
- Area: less than one acre
- Built: c. 1900
- MPS: Tobacco Buildings in Lancaster City MPS
- NRHP reference No.: 90001391
- Added to NRHP: September 21, 1990

The Walter Schnader Tobacco Warehouse is a historic, American tobacco warehouse that is located in Lancaster, Lancaster County, Pennsylvania.

It was listed on the National Register of Historic Places in 1990.

== History and architectural features ==
Built circa 1900, this historic structure is a three-story, rectangular brick building with a flat roof and stone foundation, stretching three bays wide.

Besides being used as a warehouse, the building has also been used as a recording studio. In 2012, a process was begun to buy the building for $245,000 and turn it into a microdistillery, making rye whiskey.

It is a few doors down from the R. K. Schnader & Sons Tobacco Warehouse which is also listed on the National Register.
