= Steinman Hardware Store =

- U.S. National Register of Historic Places
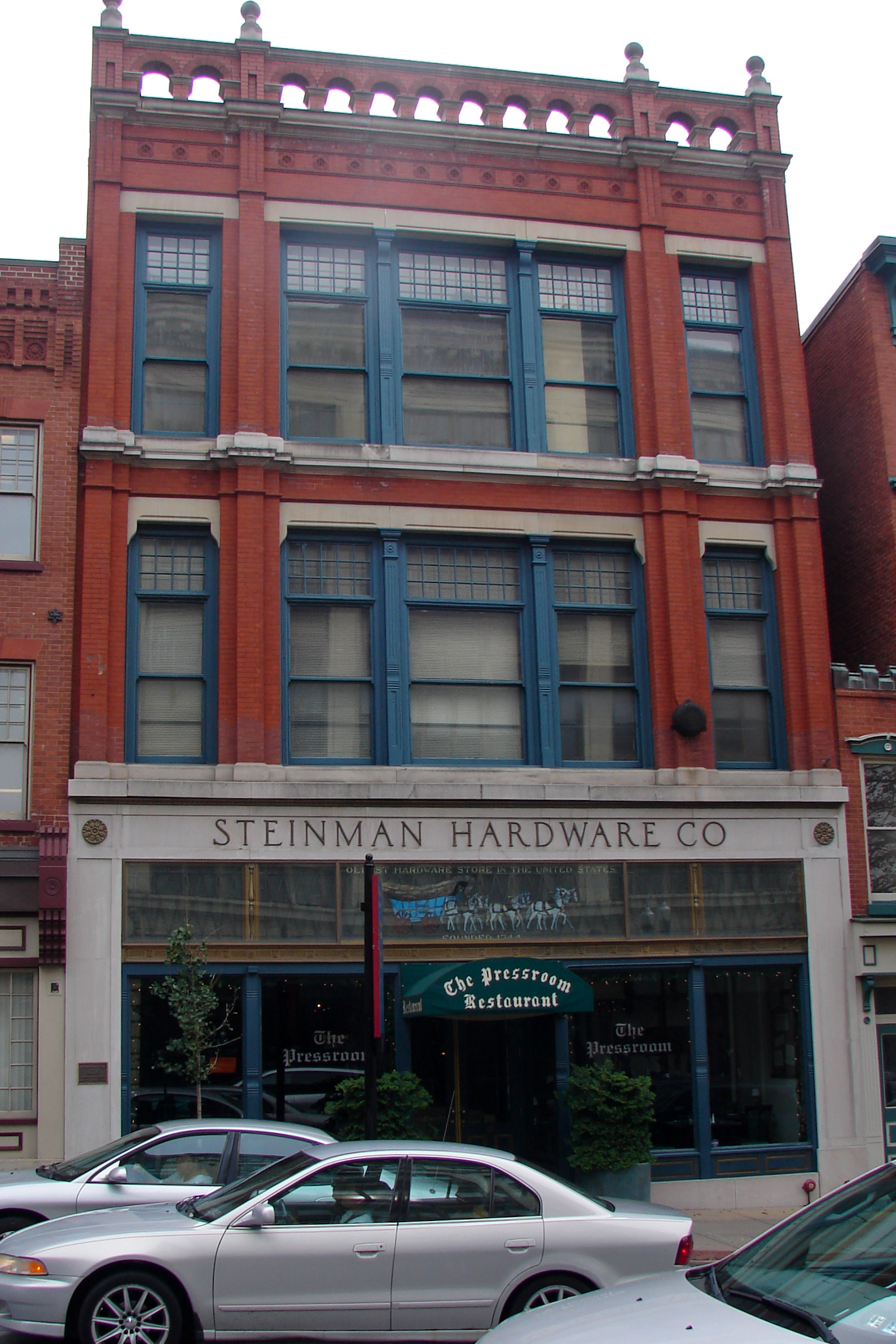
- Steinman Hardware Store, October 2010

- Location within Pennsylvania Location within the United States
- Location: 26-28 W. King St., Lancaster, Pennsylvania
- Coordinates: 40°2′13″N 76°18′21″W
- Area: 0.2 acres (0.081 ha)
- Built: 1886
- Architect: Kennedy, R.
- Architectural style: Queen Anne
- NRHP reference No.: 79002258
- Added to NRHP: October 18, 1979

Steinman Hardware Store is a historic commercial building located at Lancaster, Lancaster County, Pennsylvania. It was built in 1886, and is a three-story, brick and cast iron building in the Queen Anne style. It features a brick and stone balustrade at the roofline and a cut stone, metal, and stained glass storefront believed to date to 1744. As of April 2025, South County Brewing Company is opening their 3rd retail location on premise. The Steinman Hardware Store was first located at this site in 1793.

It was listed on the National Register of Historic Places in 1979.
