= J. B. Milleysack Cigar Factory =

- U.S. National Register of Historic Places
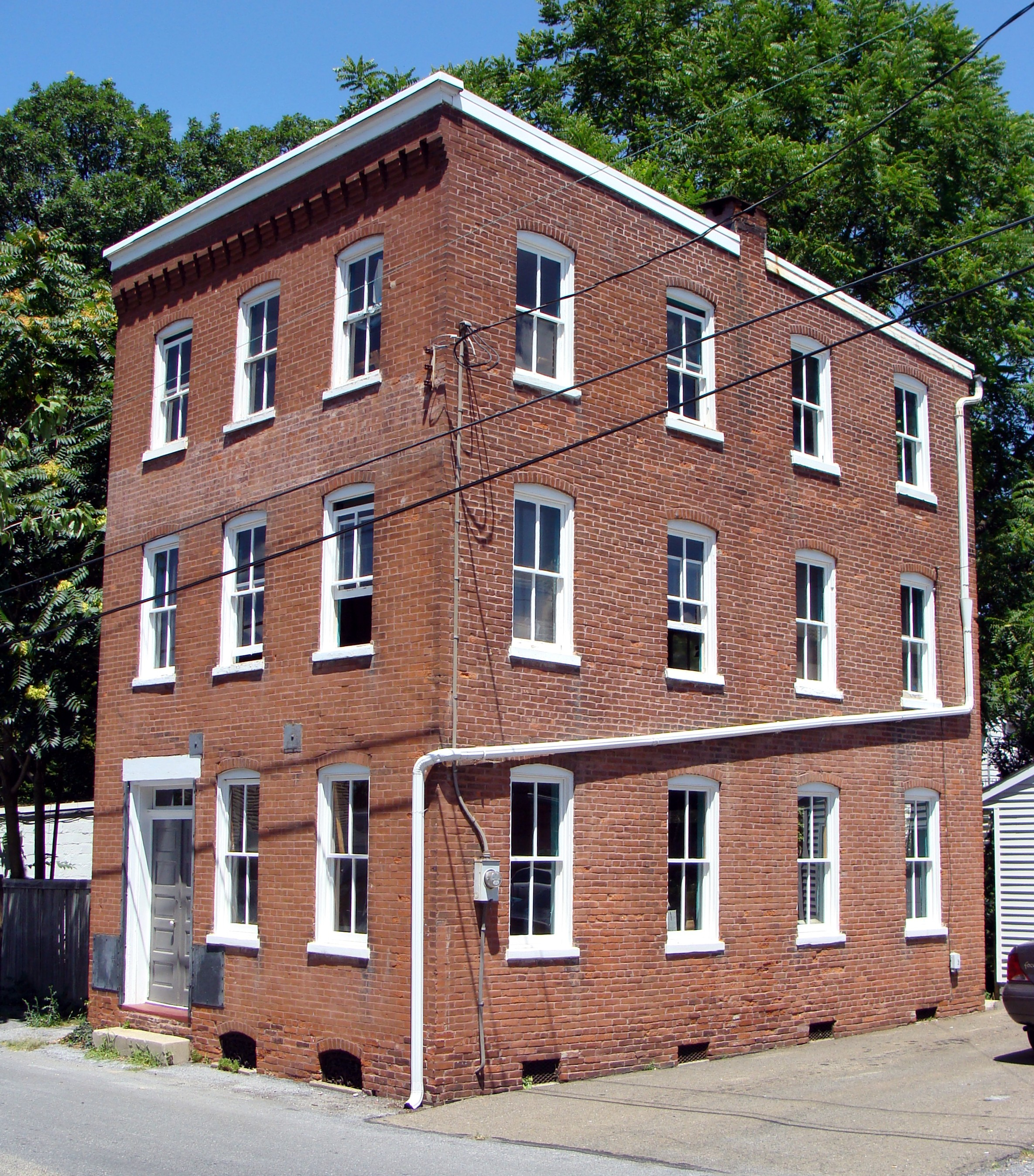
- The Milleysack Cigar Factory building in 2010

- Location within Pennsylvania Location within the United States
- Location: 820 Columbia Ave., Lancaster, Pennsylvania
- Coordinates: 40°2′15″N 76°19′22″W
- Area: 0.1 acres (0.040 ha)
- Built: 1898
- MPS: Tobacco Buildings in Lancaster City MPS
- NRHP reference No.: 90001401
- Added to NRHP: September 21, 1990

The J. B. Milleysack Cigar Factory is an historic cigar factory which is located in Lancaster, Lancaster County, Pennsylvania, United States.

It was listed on the National Register of Historic Places in 1990.

== History and architectural features ==
Built in 1898, this historic structure is a three-story, rectangular, red brick building which sits on a stone foundation. It is three bays by four bays and has a shed-type roof. The building was damaged by fire in January 1990, and subsequently restored. It housed a cigar factory and later a toy manufacturer.

It was listed on the National Register of Historic Places in 1990.
