= Sprenger Brewery =

- U.S. National Register of Historic Places
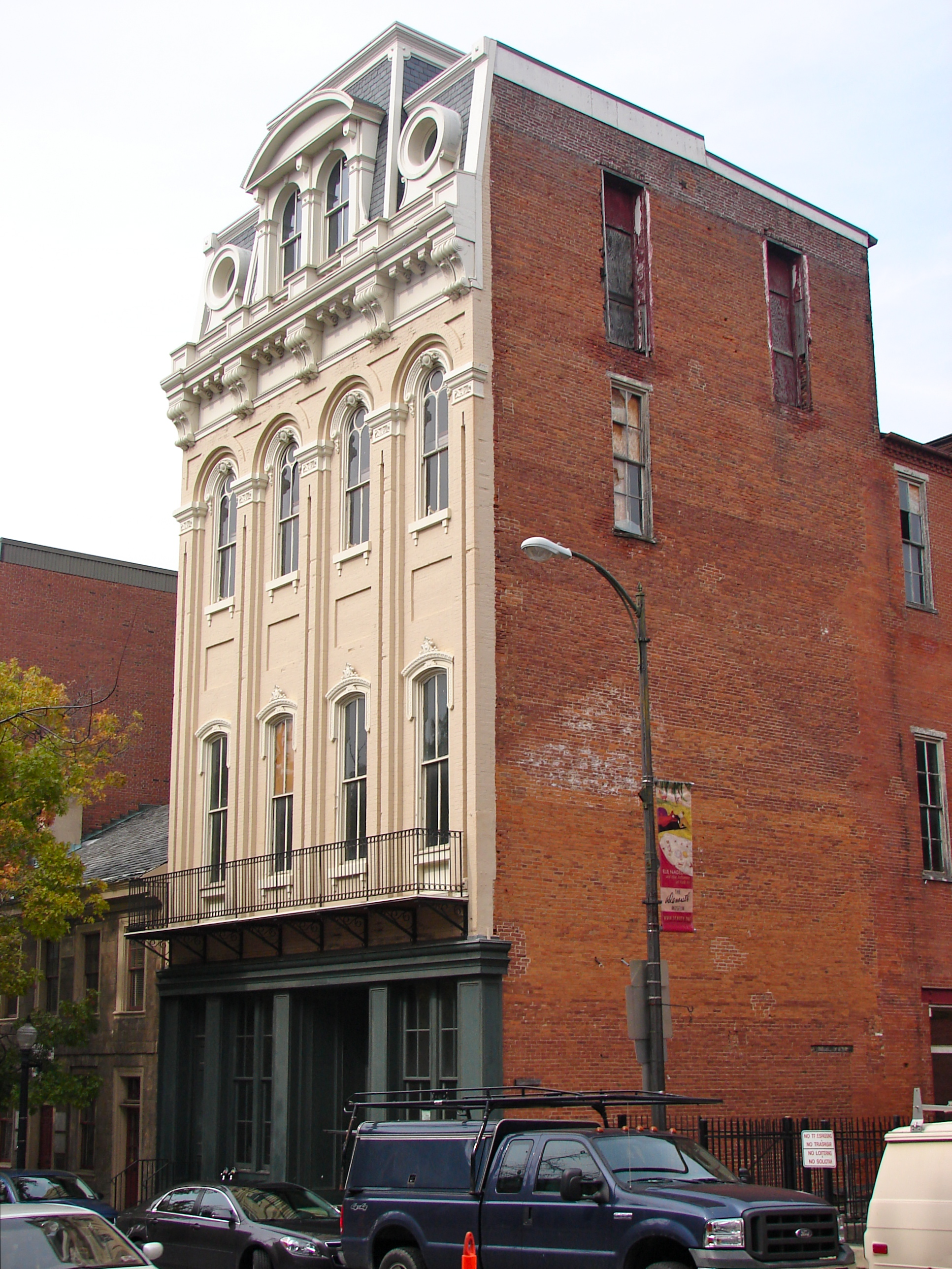
- Excelsior Hall, October 2010

- Location within Pennsylvania Location within the United States
- Location: 125-131 E. King St., Lancaster, Pennsylvania
- Coordinates: 40°2′19″N 76°18′10″W
- Area: 0.4 acres (0.16 ha)
- Built: c. 1857, 1873, c. 1910
- Built by: Sprenger, John Abraham
- Architectural style: Second Empire
- NRHP reference No.: 79002257
- Added to NRHP: November 27, 1979

The Sprenger Brewery, also known as the Excelsior Brewery Complex, is an historic brewery complex in Lancaster, Lancaster County, Pennsylvania, United States.

It was listed on the National Register of Historic Places in 1979.

== History and architectural features ==
This complex consists of five buildings and an open area. The Excelsior Hall was built in 1873, and is a four-story building that measures thirty-three feet by 105 feet. It features a Victorian storefront that once housed the brewery saloon and a restored heavy, sculptural mansard roof in the Second Empire style. The remaining buildings are a two-story building with stone basement vaults built circa 1857, a forty-nine-foot by sixty-nine-foot infill building that was built circa 1910; a Victorian warehouse that measures forty-four feet, six inches by eight-eight feet, six inches, and a two-story, brick stable.
