= Henry Krauskap House =

Historic house in Pennsylvania, United States

- U.S. National Register of Historic Places
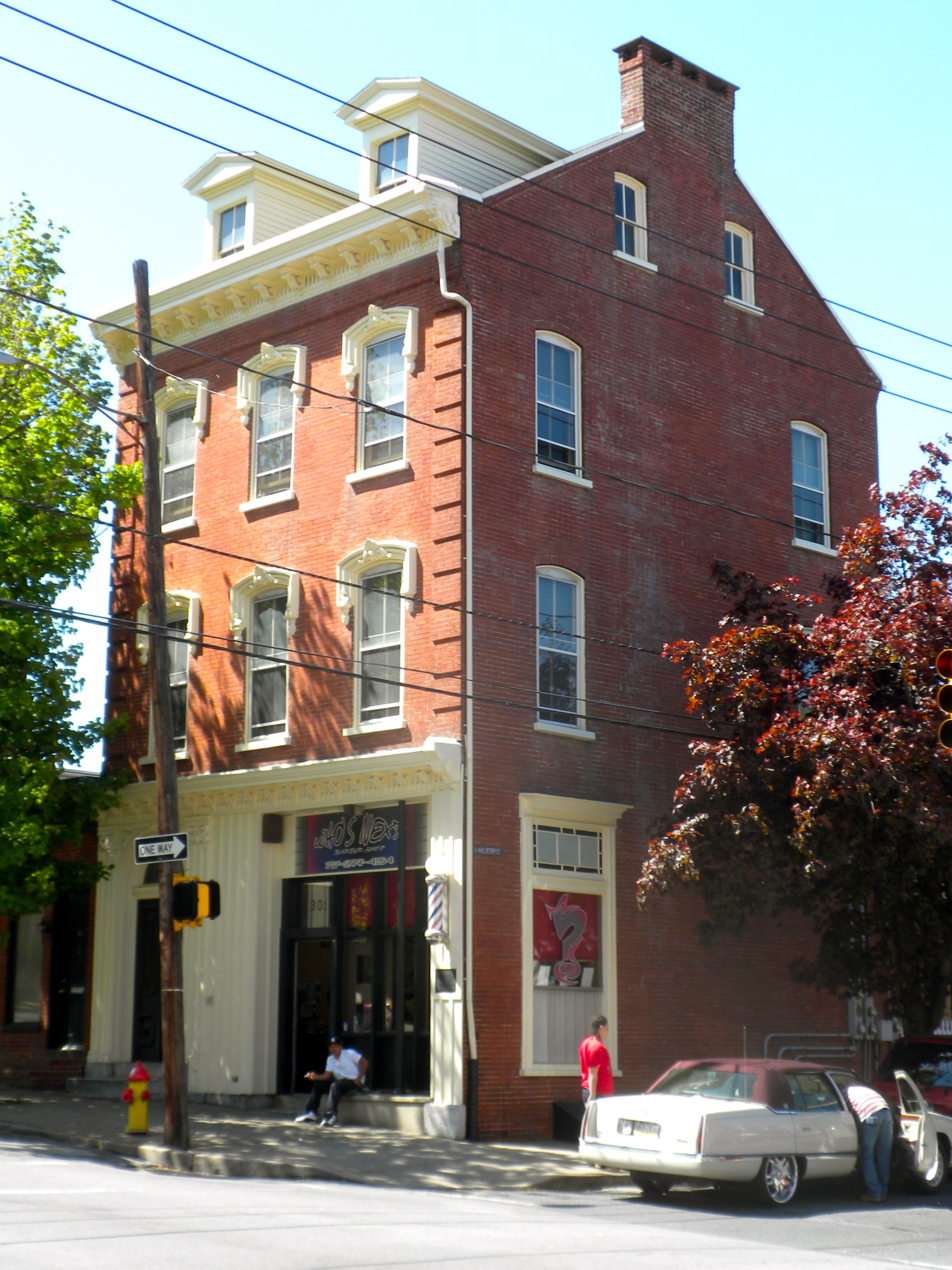
- Henry Krauskap House, April 2010

- Location within Pennsylvania Location within the United States
- Location: 301-303 1/2 W. King St., Lancaster, Pennsylvania
- Coordinates: 40°2′2″N 76°18′39″W
- Area: less than one acre
- Built: 1874
- Architectural style: Italianate
- NRHP reference No.: 82001539
- Added to NRHP: October 7, 1982

The Henry Krauskap House, also known as Henry Krauskap House and Store and Meiskey's, is an historic home which is located in Lancaster, Lancaster County, Pennsylvania.

It was listed on the National Register of Historic Places in 1982.

== History and architectural features ==
Built in 1874, this historic structure is a 3 1/2-story, three-bay, brick, combined, commercial-residential building, which was designed in the Italianate style. It has a two-story rear wing. A small brick one-story commercial addition was built between 1886 and 1888. It is the oldest surviving structure for the manufacturing and marketing of cigar boxes and tobacco related products.
