= Lancaster Crematorium =

- U.S. National Register of Historic Places
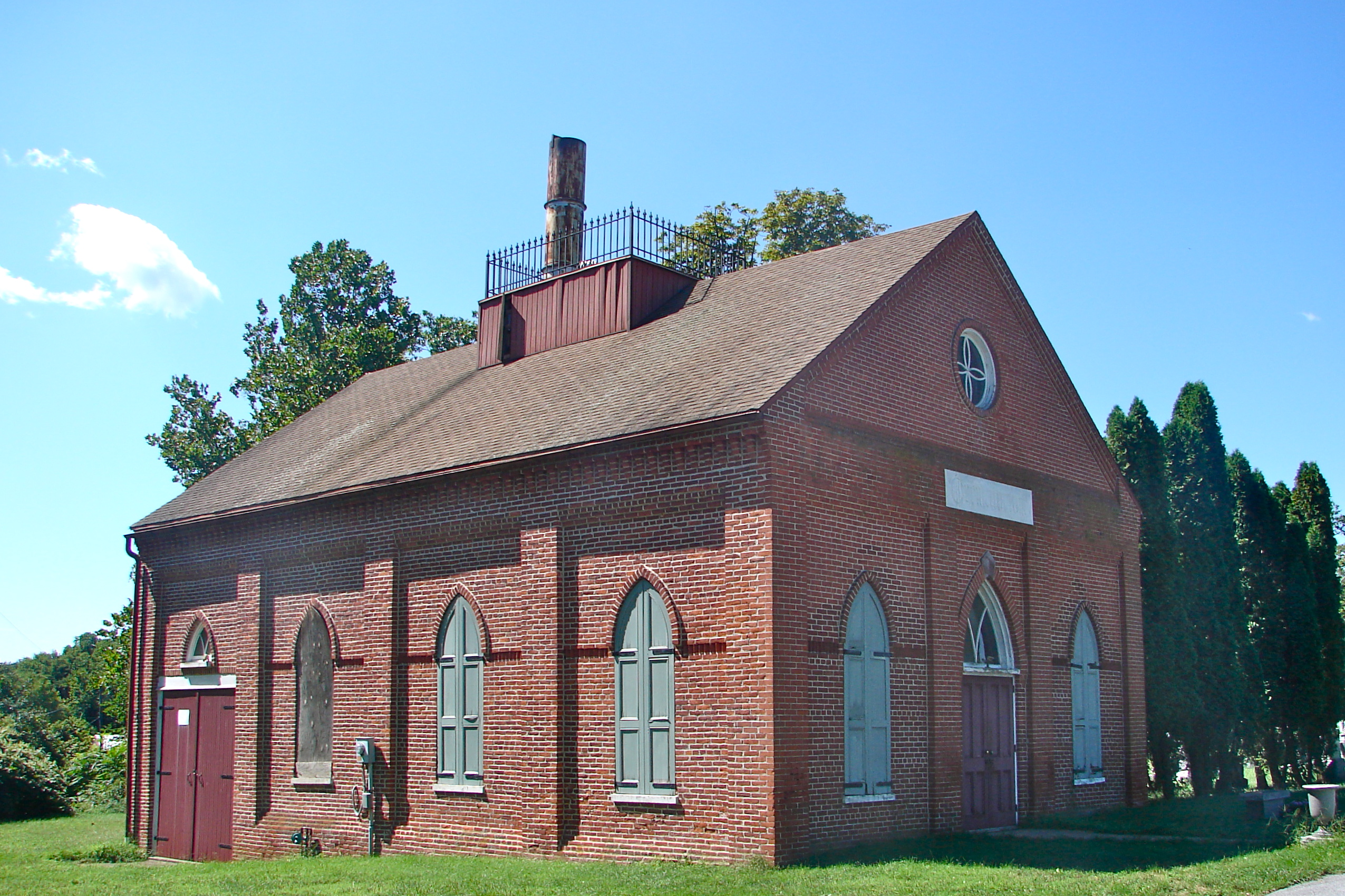
- Lancaster Crematorium, August 2070

- Location within Pennsylvania Location within the United States
- Location: Greenwood Cemetery, 719 Highland Ave., Lancaster, Pennsylvania
- Coordinates: 40°1′37″N 76°18′17″W
- Area: 20 acres (8.1 ha)
- Built: 1884
- Built by: Dinkelberg, Philip
- Architectural style: Late Gothic Revival
- NRHP reference No.: 83002253
- Added to NRHP: April 14, 1983

Lancaster Crematorium is a historic crematorium located at Greenwood Cemetery in Lancaster, Lancaster County, Pennsylvania.

It was listed on the National Register of Historic Places in 1983.

== History ==
The Crematorium was built in 1884, and is a one-story, brick building in the Late Gothic Revival style. It measures 48 feet by 32 feet and has a moderately pitched gable roof.
