= John Brimmer Tobacco Warehouse =

- U.S. National Register of Historic Places
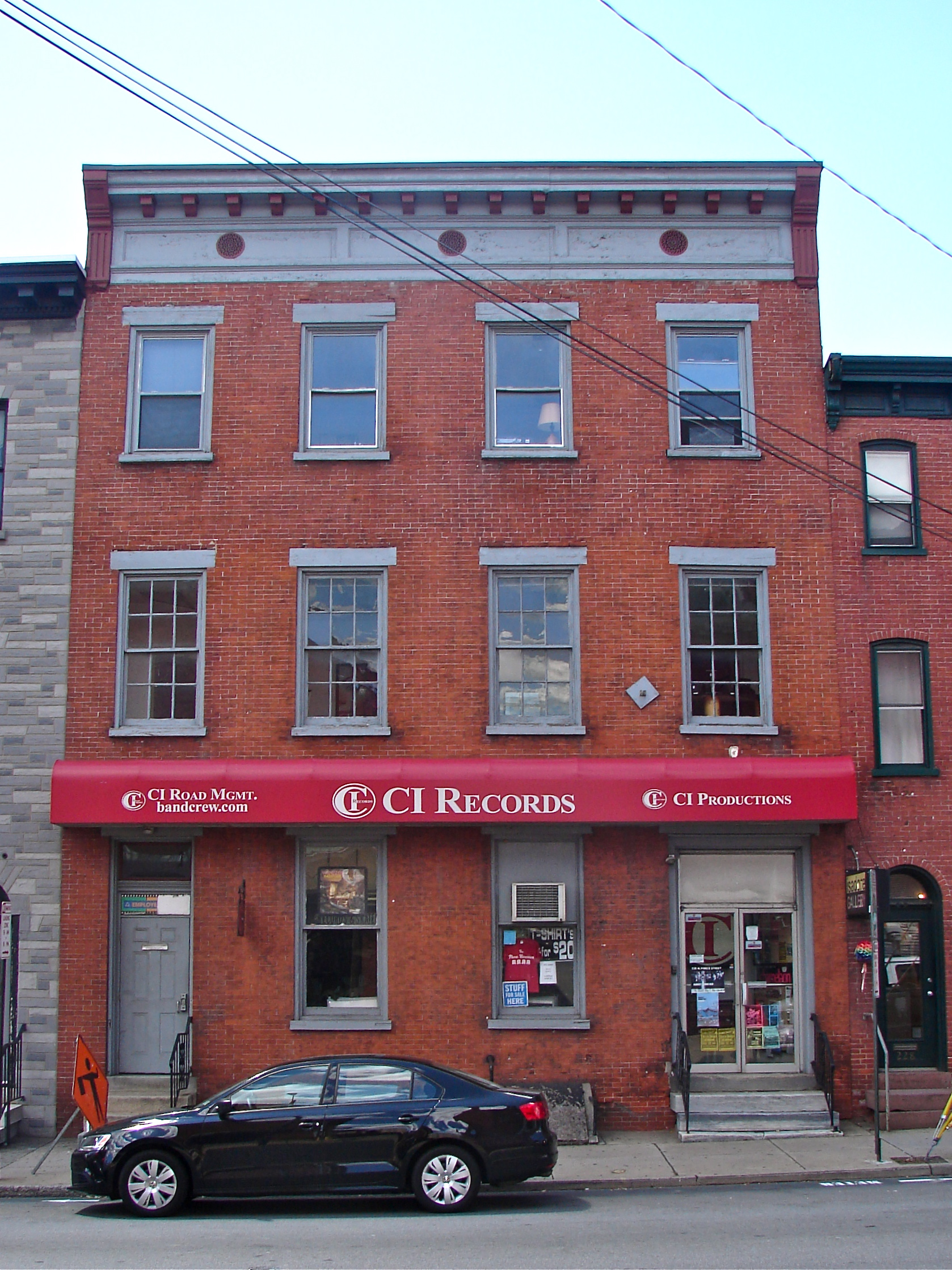
- 226 N. Prince St., August 2011

- Location within Pennsylvania Location within the United States
- Location: 226 N. Prince St., Lancaster, Pennsylvania
- Coordinates: 40°2′30″N 76°17′51″W
- Area: less than one acre
- Built: c. 1901
- MPS: Tobacco Buildings in Lancaster City MPS
- NRHP reference No.: 90001390
- Added to NRHP: September 21, 1990

John Brimmer Tobacco Warehouse is a historic tobacco warehouse located at Lancaster, Lancaster County, Pennsylvania. It was built about 1901, and is a three-story, rectangular brick building with a stone foundation and flat roof. It is four bays wide and approximately 148 feet deep.

It was listed on the National Register of Historic Places in 1990.
