= Jacob Bowman Tobacco Warehouse =

- U.S. National Register of Historic Places
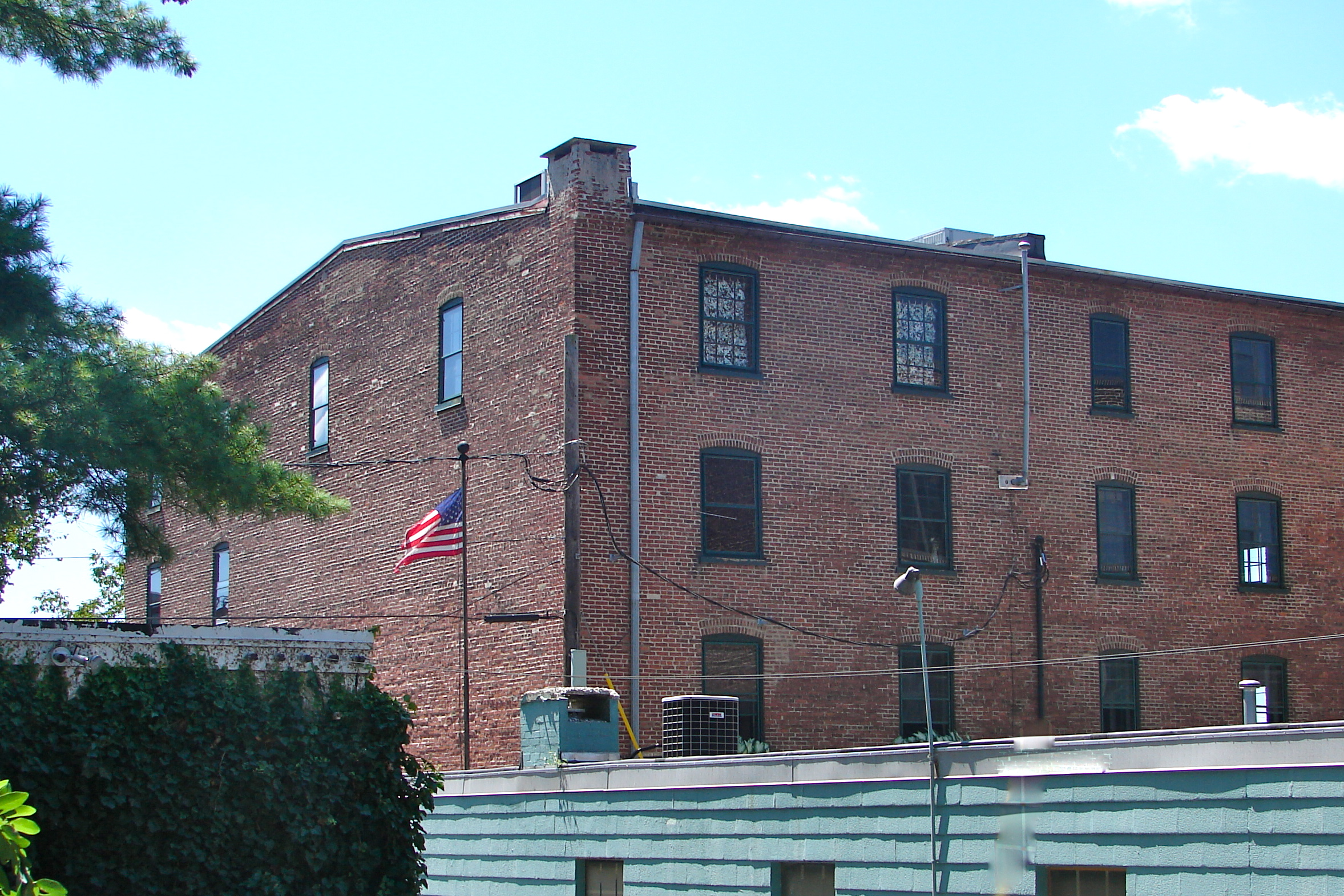
- Jacob Bowman Tobacco Warehouse, August 2011

- Location within Pennsylvania Location within the United States
- Location: 226–230 E. Grant St., Lancaster, Pennsylvania
- Coordinates: 40°2′24″N 76°18′3″W
- Area: less than one acre
- Built: 1906
- MPS: Tobacco Buildings in Lancaster City MPS
- NRHP reference No.: 90001400
- Added to NRHP: September 21, 1990

Jacob Bowman Tobacco Warehouse is a historic tobacco warehouse located at Lancaster, Lancaster County, Pennsylvania. It was built in 1906, and is a four-story, rectangular brick building over a raised basement. It is five bays wide and between 60 and 75 feet deep.

It was listed on the National Register of Historic Places in 1990.
