= American/Consolidated Tobacco Companies buildings =

- American/Consolidated Tobacco Companies
- U.S. National Register of Historic Places
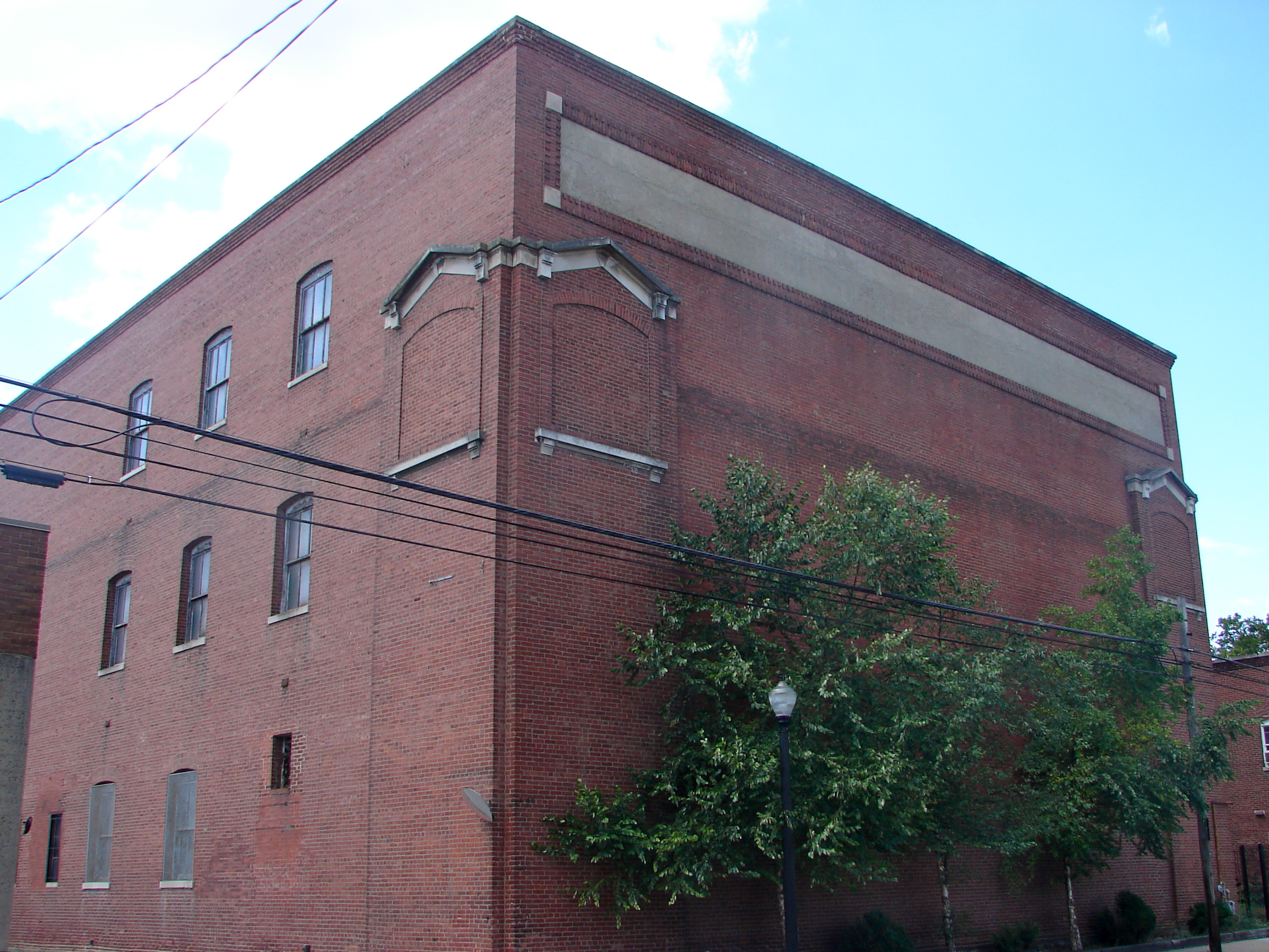
- 820 N. Prince St., August 2011

- Location within Pennsylvania Location within the United States
- Location: 820–830 N. Prince St., Lancaster, Pennsylvania
- Coordinates: 40°3′1″N 76°18′38″W
- Area: 1.5 acres (0.61 ha)
- Built: 1907–1910, c. 1925
- MPS: Tobacco Buildings in Lancaster City MPS
- NRHP reference No.: 90001398
- Added to NRHP: September 21, 1991

The American/Consolidated Tobacco Companies, also known as the Domestic Tobacco Co., is a set of two historic, American tobacco warehouses that are located in Lancaster, Lancaster County, Pennsylvania.

It was listed on the National Register of Historic Places in 1991.

== History and architectural features ==
Built between 1907 and 1910, these historic warehouses are brick buildings that sit on stone foundations. They are set parallel to one another, twenty-five feet apart. The south building is three stories tall and measures seventy feet wide by 220 feet deep. An addition was built circa 1925, making the total depth 300 feet. The north building is two stories, fifty feet wide by 300 feet deep. It was expanded to its current size circa 1925.

== See also ==
- American Tobacco Company
