= Basch & Fisher Tobacco Warehouse =

- U.S. National Register of Historic Places
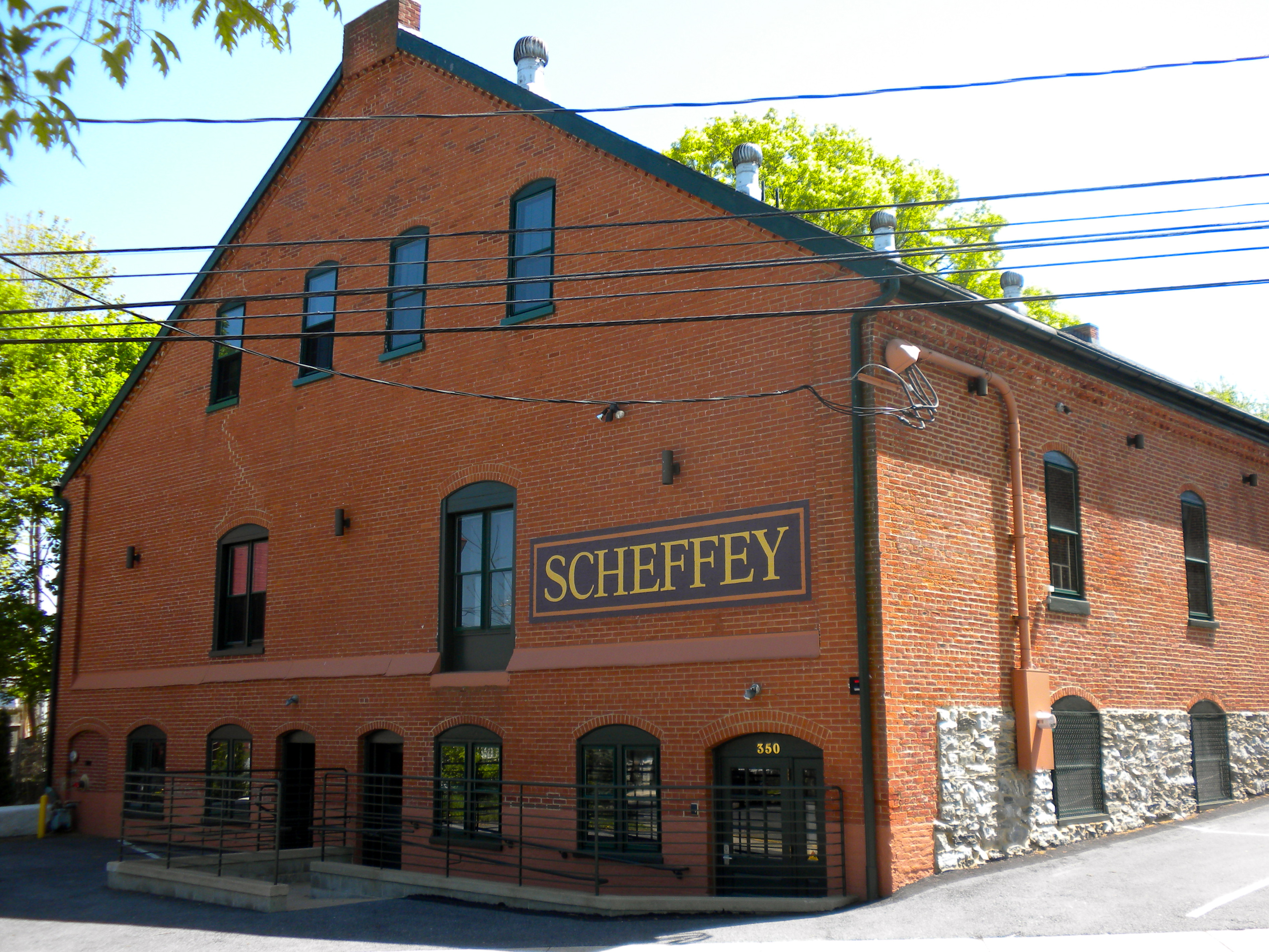
- Basch & Fisher Tobacco Warehouse, April 2010

- Location within Pennsylvania Location within the United States
- Location: 348 New Holland Ave., Lancaster, Pennsylvania
- Coordinates: 40°2′38″N 76°17′57″W
- Area: less than one acre
- Built: c. 1880
- MPS: Tobacco Buildings in Lancaster City MPS
- NRHP reference No.: 90001399
- Added to NRHP: September 21, 1990

The Basch & Fisher Tobacco Warehouse is a historic tobacco warehouse which is located in Lancaster, Lancaster County, Pennsylvania, United States.

It was listed on the National Register of Historic Places in 1990.

== History and architectural features ==
Built circa 1880, this warehouse is a one-and-one-half-story, rectangular, brick building, four bays wide and five bays deep, with a front gable roof. It sits on a stone foundation covered in stucco or brick.
