= North Prince Street Historic District =

Historic district in Pennsylvania, United States

- U.S. National Register of Historic Places
- U.S. Historic district
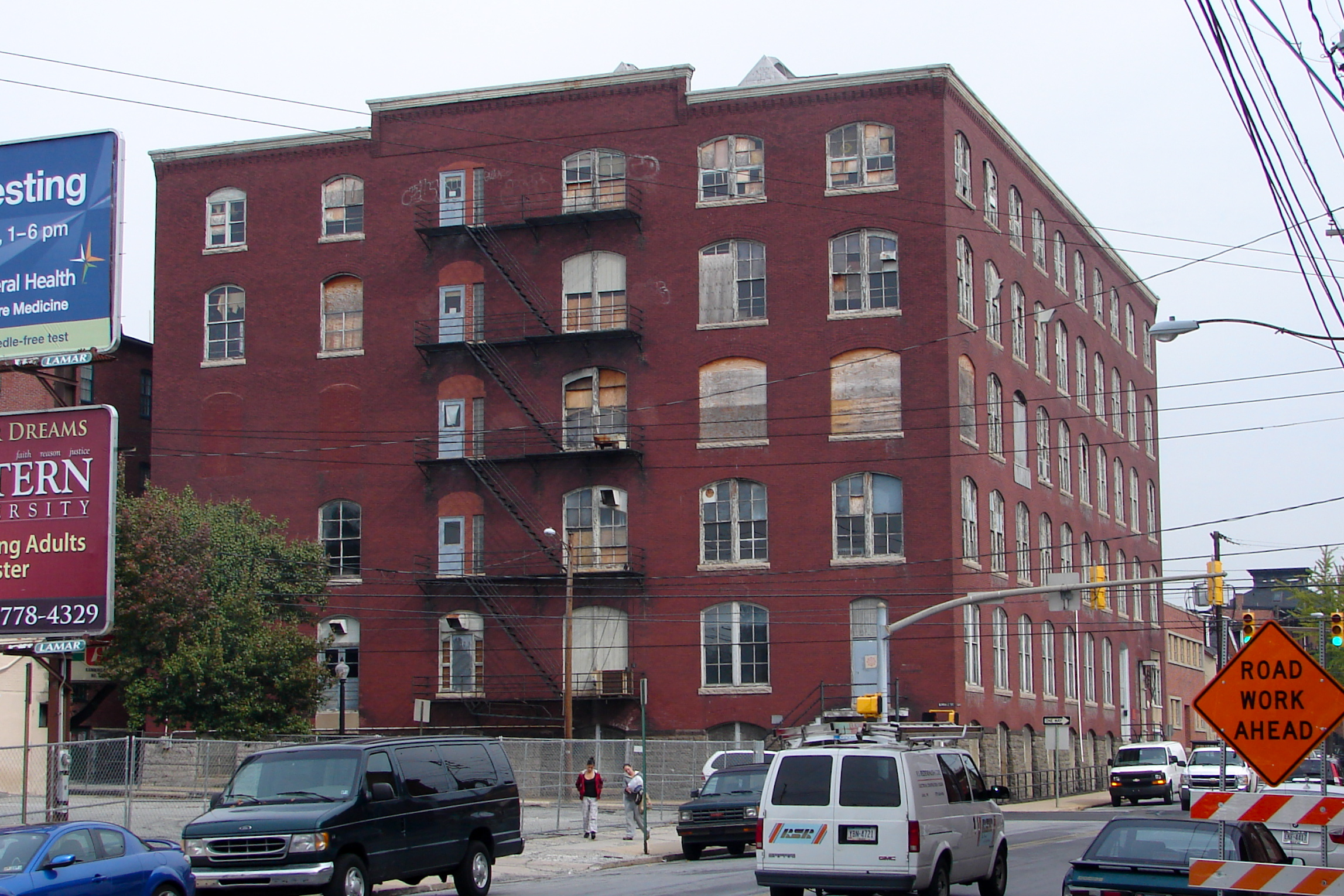
- North Prince Street Historic District, October 2010

- Location within Pennsylvania Location within the United States
- Location: Roughly N. Prince St. and W. Lemon St., Lancaster, Pennsylvania
- Coordinates: 40°2′39″N 76°18′33″W
- Area: 2 acres (0.81 ha)
- NRHP reference No.: 89001054
- Added to NRHP: August 18, 1989

The North Prince Street Historic District is an historic tobacco warehouse complex and national historic district located in Lancaster, Lancaster County, Pennsylvania, United States.

They were listed on the National Register of Historic Places in 1989.

== History and architectural features ==
This district includes seven contributing buildings that were built roughly between 1881 and 1913, including the Baumgardner Brothers Tobacco Warehouse (c. 1881), the Standard Caramel Company Factory (1906), the S.R. Moss Cigar Company (1907), the Otto Eisenlohr Tobacco Warehouse (c. 1907), and the William Levy/Joseph Goldberg/Block Brothers Tobacco Warehouse (c. 1909, c. 1911, c. 1913). All seven structures are brick buildings that are two to five stories tall; six of the seven were used for the processing and storage of cigar leaf tobacco.
