= Eisenlohr–Bayuk Tobacco Historic District =

Historic district in Pennsylvania, United States

- U.S. National Register of Historic Places
- U.S. Historic district
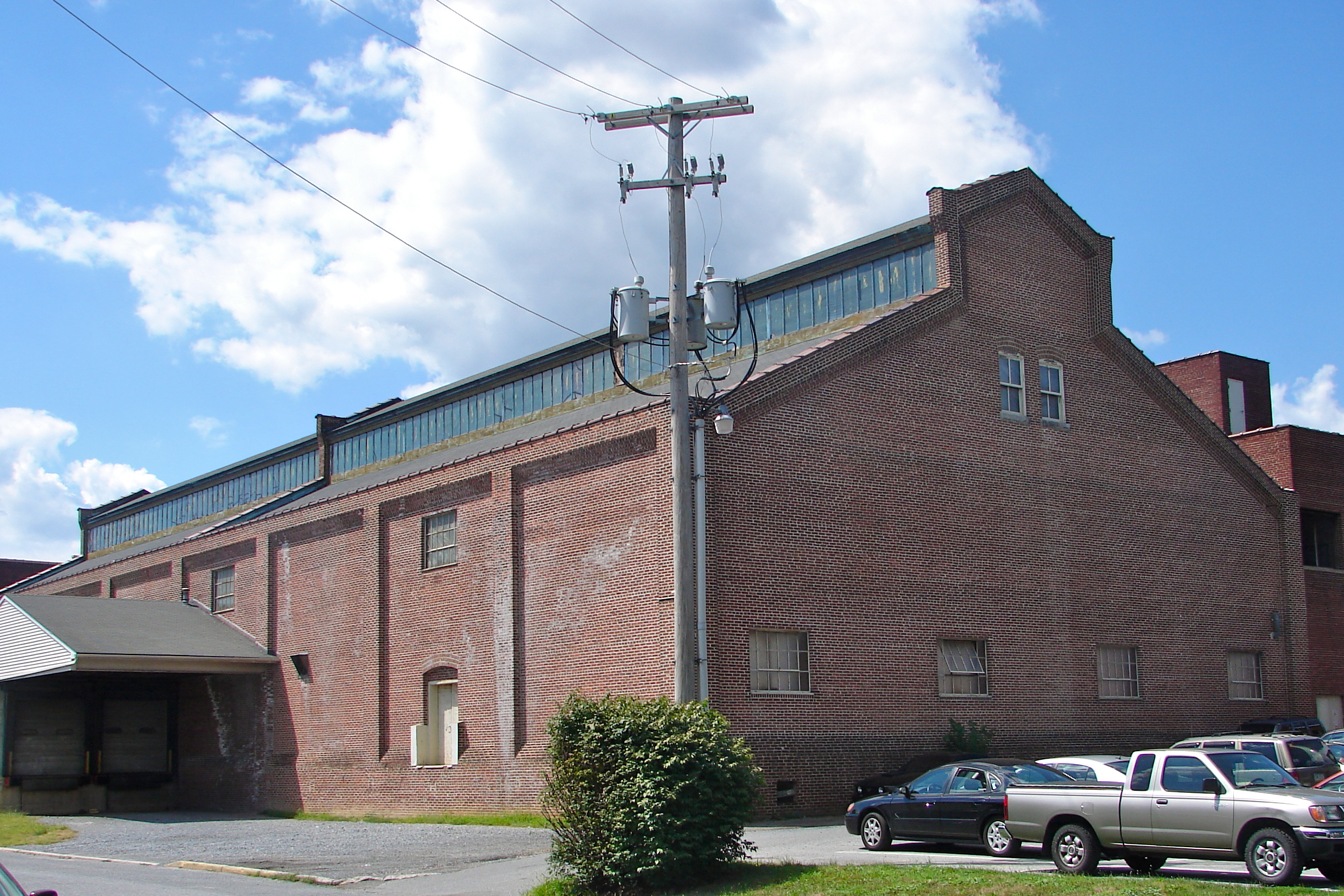
- Eisenlohr–Bayuk Tobacco Historic District, August 2011

- Location within Pennsylvania Location within the United States
- Location: N. Water St., at W. Liberty St., Lancaster, Pennsylvania
- Coordinates: 40°3′4″N 76°18′43″W
- Area: 4.8 acres (1.9 ha)
- Architectural style: Tobacco Warehouse
- MPS: Tobacco Buildings in Lancaster City MPS
- NRHP reference No.: 90001397
- Added to NRHP: September 21, 1990

Eisenlohr–Bayuk Tobacco Historic District is a historic tobacco warehouse complex and national historic district located at Lancaster, Pennsylvania, United States. It includes 10 contributing buildings and 1 contributing structure. The buildings consist of five constructed by the Otto Eisenlohr and Brothers between 1911 and 1921, four constructed by the Bayuk Cigar Co. between 1923 and about 1935, and the Jacob Reist Tobacco Warehouse built in 1923. The contributing structure is an approximately 50 foot tall smokestack built in 1923. All buildings are rectangular brick buildings used for the processing and storage of cigar leaf tobacco.

It was listed on the National Register of Historic Places in 1990.
