= Jacob L. Frey Tobacco Warehouse =

- U.S. National Register of Historic Places
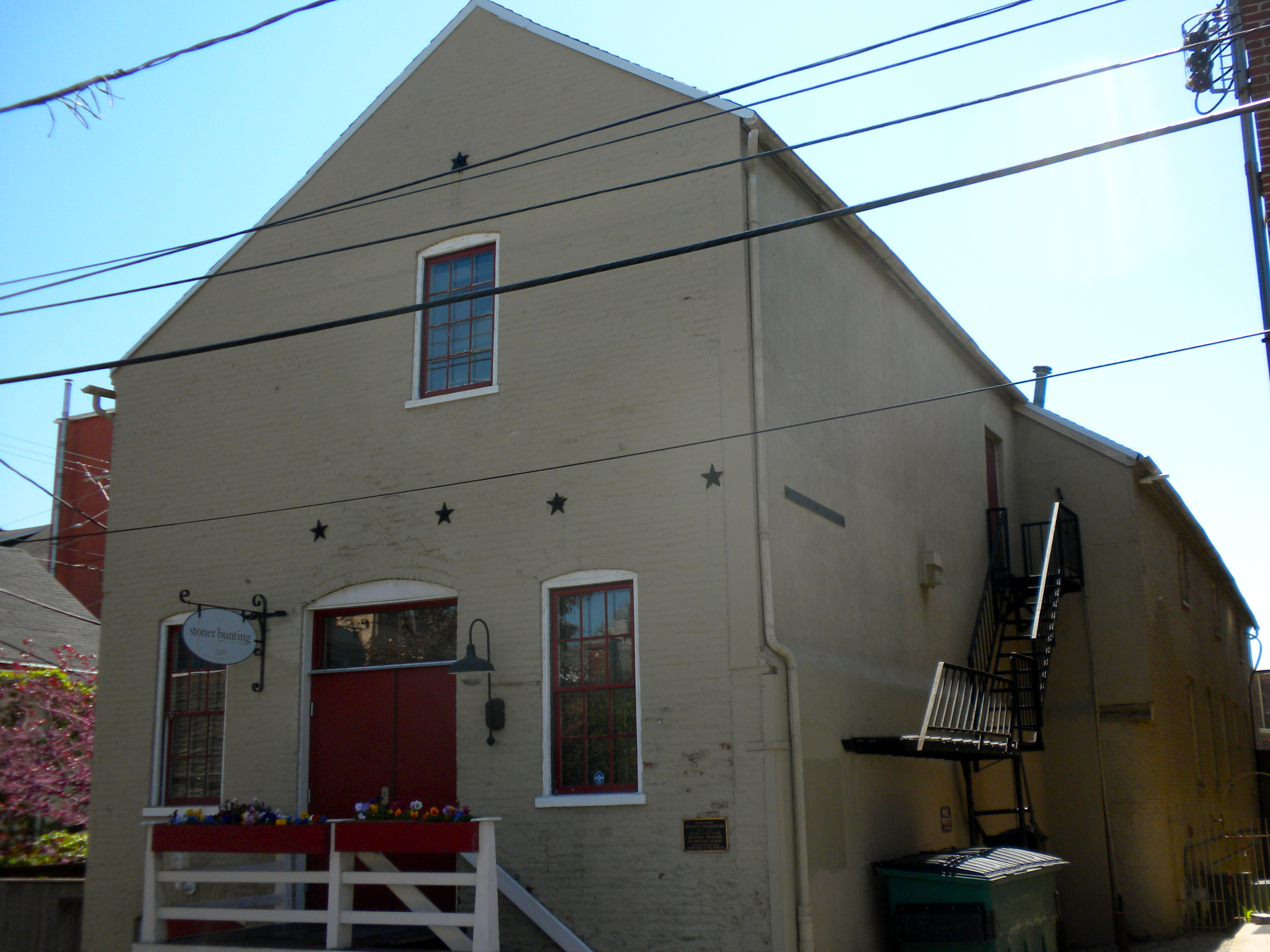
- Frey Warehouse, April 2010

- Location within Pennsylvania Location within the United States
- Location: 210 W. Grant St., Lancaster, Pennsylvania
- Coordinates: 40°2′16″N 76°19′17″W
- Area: less than one acre
- Built: c. 1870
- MPS: Tobacco Buildings in Lancaster City MPS
- NRHP reference No.: 90001396
- Added to NRHP: September 21, 1990

Jacob L. Frey Tobacco Warehouse is a historic tobacco warehouse located at Lancaster, Lancaster County, Pennsylvania. It was built about 1870, and is a two-story, irregular brick building with a raised basement and gable front roof. It is three bays wide and approximately 60 feet deep.

It was listed on the National Register of Historic Places in 1990.
