= Northwest Corridor (Lancaster) =

- Neighborhood
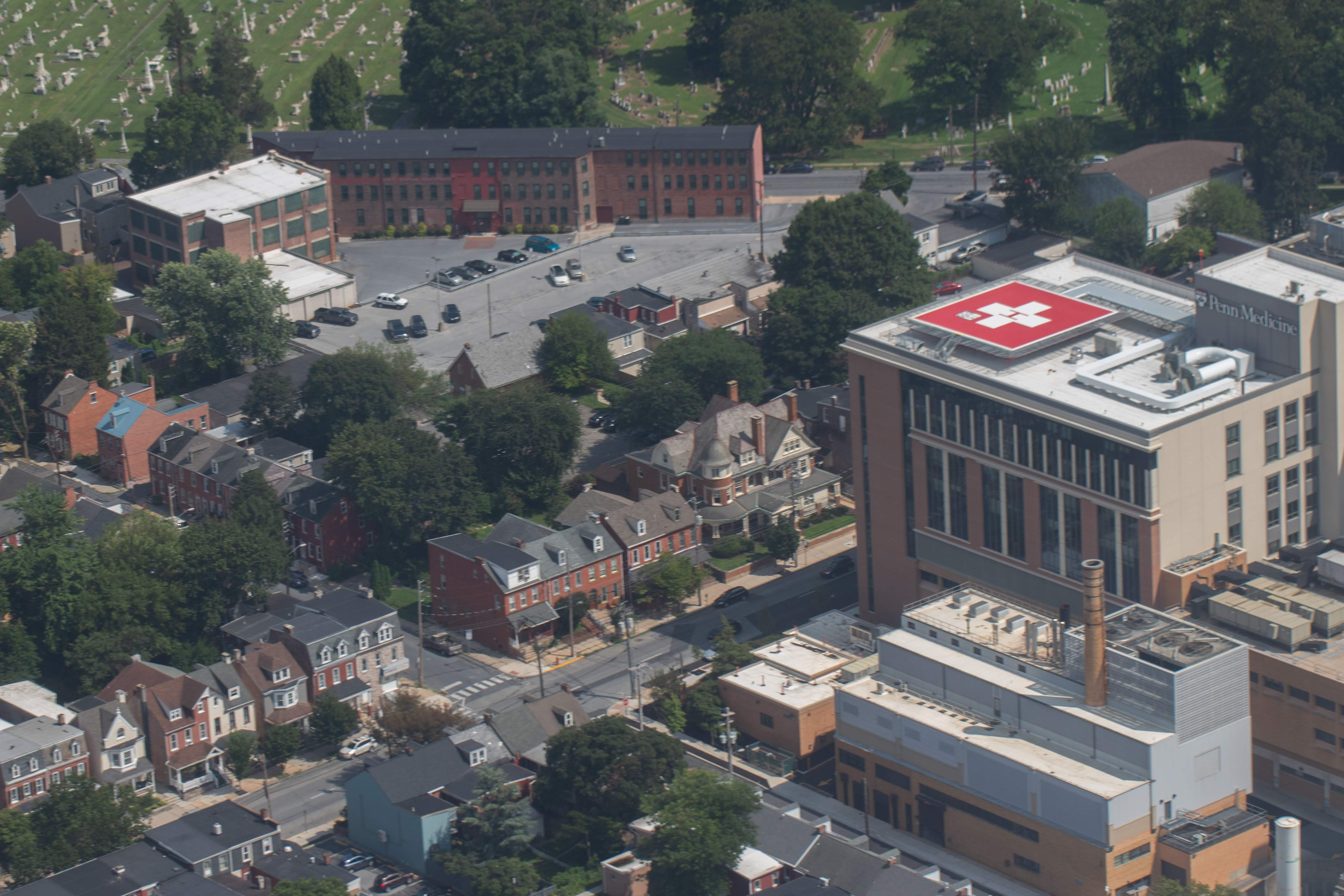
- Aerial view of the Northwest Corridor and Lancaster General Health
- Interactive map of Northwest Corridor
- Country: United States
- State: Pennsylvania
- County: Lancaster County
- City: Lancaster, Pennsylvania
- Postal code: 17601
- Area code: 717

The Northwest Corridor is a neighborhood on the northwestern corner of Lancaster, Pennsylvania. With an overall distance of 1.5 miles (2.4 km), this planned corridor links key socioeconomic, commercial, industrial, and civic developments within the city and in the nearby suburbs of East Hempfield Township and Manheim Township.

== History and features ==
Many of Lancaster's amenities are located in the Northwest Corridor, to include Franklin & Marshall College, Penn Medicine Lancaster General Health, and Clipper Magazine Stadium—home to the Lancaster Stormers of the Atlantic League of Professional Baseball.

The Northwest Corridor is further subdivided by the Stadium District and the Northwest Gateway Project. A short rail trail called Northwest Corridor Linear Park occupies 0.26 miles (0.42 km) of urban green space between Harrisburg Avenue and Lemon Street.

The Northwest Corridor features two main arteries that unify the three most highly-populated areas of Lancaster County. Harrisburg Pike is the major thoroughfare that connects Lancaster to the Park City Center shopping mall, as well as East Hempfield to important services and attractions within the city limits. Prince Street connects Lancaster to Manheim, a nearby suburban township with significant commercial and industrial development.

== Redevelopment ==
The Redevelopment Authority of Lancaster County planned the large-scale urban renewal of the Northwest Corridor for $75-million starting with the building of Clipper Magazine Stadium in 2003. Lancaster General Health and Franklin & Marshall College followed with their own massive building projects, expanding their campuses northward. Franklin & Marshall acquired the property once occupied by Armstrong World Industries, a landfill, and a decommissioned rail yard. The Franklin & Marshall Diplomats football team opened their new home, Shadek Stadium, in 2017 on the former Armstrong site.
