= Slater Cigar Company buildings =

- Slater Cigar Company
- U.S. National Register of Historic Places
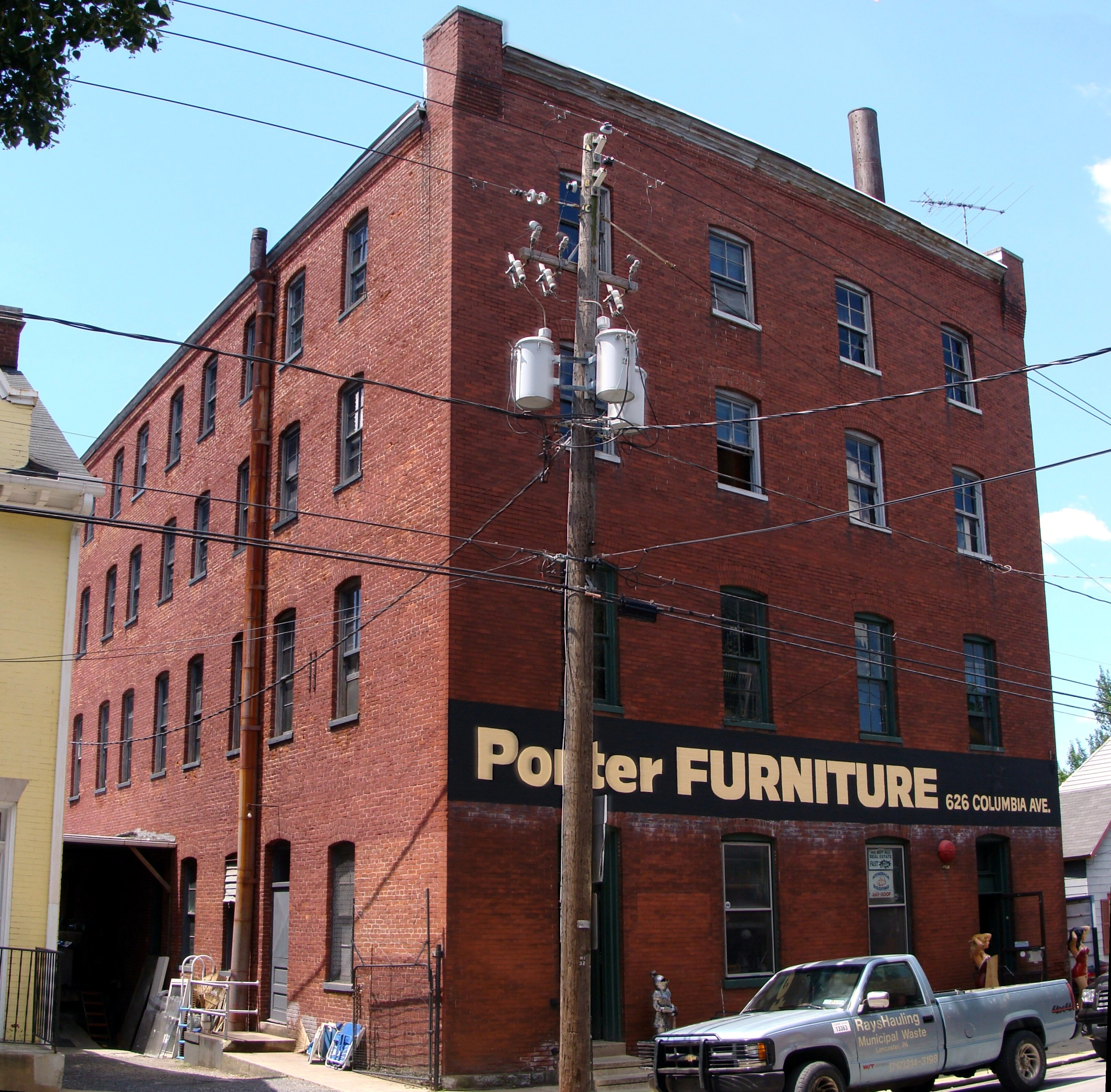
- Slater Cigar Company, July 2010

- Location within Pennsylvania Location within the United States
- Location: 625 and 626–628 Columbia Ave., Lancaster, Pennsylvania
- Coordinates: 40°2′14″N 76°19′5″W
- Area: 0.4 acres (0.16 ha)
- Built: c. 1895, 1905–1906
- Architectural style: Tobacco Warehouse
- MPS: Tobacco Buildings in Lancaster City MPS
- NRHP reference No.: 90001403
- Added to NRHP: September 21, 1990

The Slater Cigar Company is an historic site in the United States that encompasses two cigar factory and tobacco warehouse buildings. Located in Lancaster, Lancaster County, Pennsylvania, it was listed on the National Register of Historic Places in 1990.

== History and architectural features ==
The building located at 625 Columbia Avenue, was built circa 1895 and is a three-story, rectangular brick building with a high basement. It is ninety feet wide by thirty feet deep and has a flat roof. The building located at 626–628 Columbia Avenue was built between 1905 and 1906. A four-story, rectangular, brick building with a high basement, it is forty-five feet wide by 140 feet deep. A one-story brick addition was built circa 1923.
