= R. K. Schnader & Sons Tobacco Warehouse =

- U.S. National Register of Historic Places
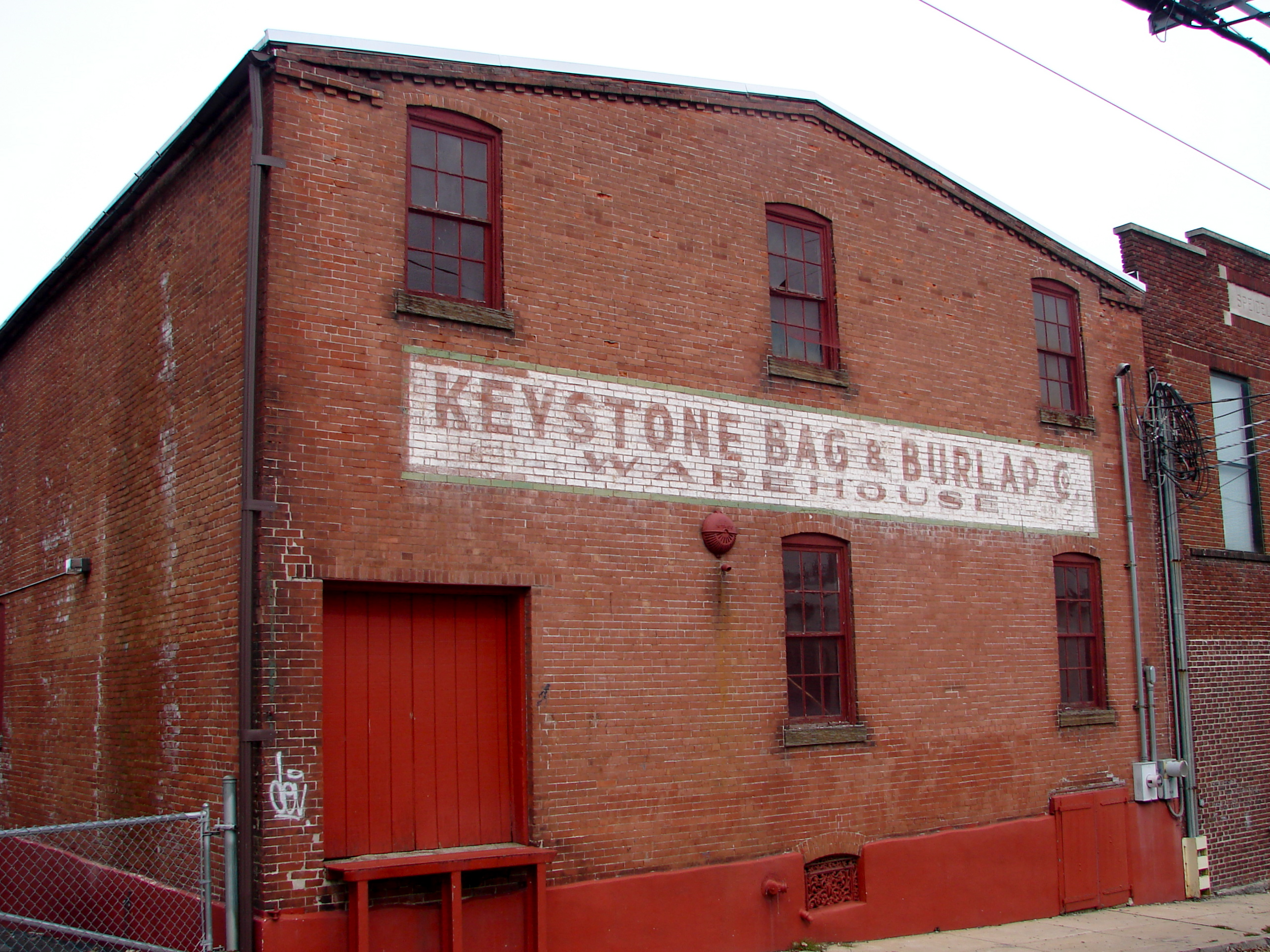
- R. K. Schnader & Sons Tobacco Warehouse, October 2010

- Location within Pennsylvania Location within the United States
- Location: 437–439 W. Grant St., Lancaster, Pennsylvania
- Coordinates: 40°2′16″N 76°18′54″W
- Area: less than one acre
- Built: c. 1890
- MPS: Tobacco Buildings in Lancaster City MPS
- NRHP reference No.: 90001404
- Added to NRHP: September 21, 1990

The R. K. Schnader & Sons Tobacco Warehouse is an historic tobacco warehouse in Lancaster, Lancaster County, Pennsylvania, United States.

It was listed on the National Register of Historic Places in 1990.

== History and architectural features ==
This historic structure was built circa 1890, and is a two-story, rectangular, red brick building that sits on a stuccoed foundation and has a raised basement. It is three bays wide by forty-five feet deep, and has a moderately pitched gable roof, and is situated a few doors away from the Walter Schnader Tobacco Warehouse.
