= West Lawn (Lancaster, Pennsylvania) =

Historic house in Pennsylvania, United States

- U.S. National Register of Historic Places
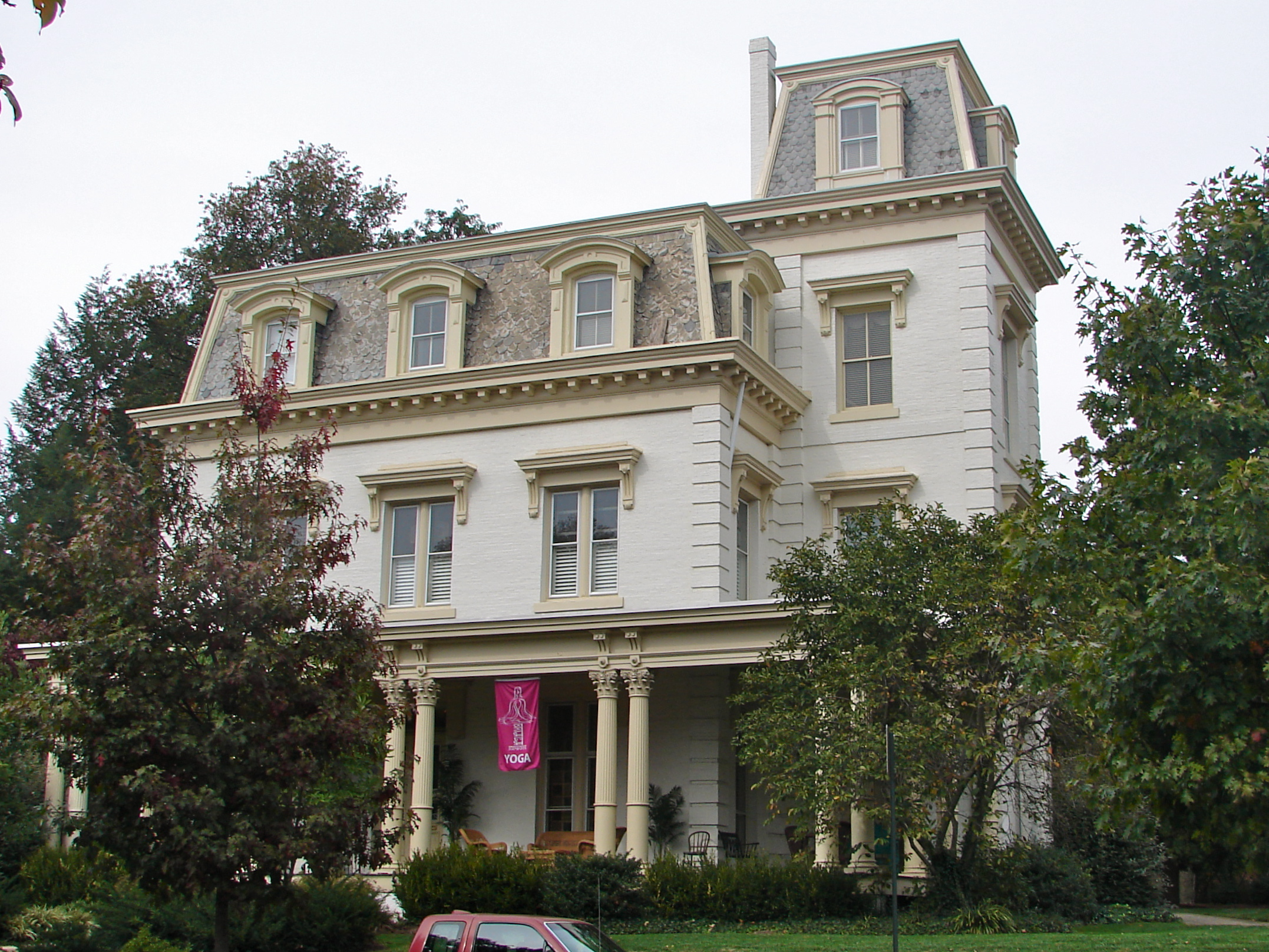
- West Lawn, October 2010

- Location within Pennsylvania Location within the United States
- Location: 407 W. Chestnut St., Lancaster, Pennsylvania
- Coordinates: 40°02′26″N 76°18′49″W
- Area: 0.5 acres (0.20 ha)
- Built: 1873-1874
- Architect: Burger, J. Adam
- Architectural style: Second Empire, Italianate
- NRHP reference No.: 84003453
- Added to NRHP: May 3, 1984

West Lawn, also known as the Embassy House Apartments, is a historic home located at Lancaster, Lancaster County, Pennsylvania. It was built in 1873–1874, and is a T-shaped dwelling with a 2 1/2-story main section and 2 1/2-story rear wing with a slate covered mansard roof in a combined Italianate / Second Empire style. It features a 3 1/2-story tower with a mansard roof. It once housed the Zeta Beta Tau Chapter at Franklin & Marshall College and in 1973 was converted to apartments.

It was listed on the National Register of Historic Places in 1984.
