= Stevens House =

Stevens Farm and Stevens Hall redirect to here

Stevens House, Stevens Farm, and other variations may refer to the following locations in the United States:

California

- Stevens House (Malibu, California), listed on the NRHP in Los Angeles County, California
- Sherman Stevens House, Tustin, California, listed on the NRHP in Orange County, California

Connecticut

- William Stevens House (Clinton, Connecticut), NRHP-listed

Delaware

- William Stevens House (Kenton, Delaware), NRHP-listed

Florida

- Ann Stevens House, Lake Helen, Florida, NRHP-listed
- Stevens-Gilchrist House, Sarasota, Florida, NRHP-listed

Georgia

- Drane-Stevens House, Buena Vista, Georgia, listed on the NRHP in Marion County, Georgia
- Dasher-Stevens House, Macon, Georgia, listed on the NRHP in Bibb County, Georgia

Idaho

- Arnold Stevens House, Jerome, Idaho, NRHP-listed

Illinois

- Stevens House (Tiskilwa, Illinois), listed on the NRHP in Bureau County, Illinois

Indiana

- Levi Stevens House, Aurora, Indiana, NRHP-listed

Maine

- Abiel Stevens House, North Andover, Maine, NRHP-listed
- John Calvin Stevens House, Portland, Maine, listed on the NRHP in Maine
- Goodale–Stevens Farm, Ogunquit, Maine, listed on the NRHP in York County, Maine

Massachusetts

- Conkey-Stevens House, Amherst, Massachusetts, NRHP-listed
- Daniel Stevens House, Worcester, Massachusetts, NRHP-listed

Michigan

- Andrew J. Stevens House, Kalamazoo, Michigan, listed on the NRHP in Kalamazoo County, Michigan

Minnesota

- John Harrington Stevens House, Minneapolis, Minnesota, listed on the NRHP in Hennepin County, Minnesota

Mississippi

- Stevens-Buchanan House, Brandon, Mississippi, listed on the NRHP in Rankin County, Mississippi

Montana

- Dominic Stevens House, Lodge Grass, Montana, listed on the NRHP in Big Horn County, Montana

Nebraska

- Wes Stevens Site, Potter, Nebraska, listed on the NRHP in Cheyenne County, Nebraska

New Jersey

- Edwin A. Stevens Hall, Hoboken, New Jersey, NRHP-listed
- Israel Stevens House, Lawrence, New Jersey, listed on the NRHP in Mercer County, New Jersey

New Hampshire

- Stevens Memorial Hall, Chester, New Hampshire, NRHP-listed

New York

- Dr. Buck-Stevens House, Brasher Falls, New York, NRHP-listed
- John Stevens House, Mount Vernon, New York, NRHP-listed
- H. R. Stevens House, New City, New York, NRHP-listed
- Stevens House (Astoria, New York), historic home of Major General Ebenezer Stevens in New York

North Carolina

- Everitt P. Stevens House, Selma, North Carolina, NRHP-listed

Oregon

- Charles Stevens House, Astoria, Oregon, NRHP-listed

South Carolina

- Stevens-Dorn Farmstead, Saluda, South Carolina, NRHP-listed

South Dakota

- Stevens Opera Block, Delmont, South Dakota, listed on the NRHP in Douglas County, South Dakota
- Stevens Ranch, Piedmont, South Dakota, listed on the NRHP in Meade County, South Dakota

Texas

- Elisha Stevens House, Cuero, Texas, listed on the NRHP in DeWitt County, Texas

Utah

- Sidney Stevens House, North Ogden, Utah, listed on the NRHP in Weber County, Utah

Washington

- Stevens Hall (Pullman, Washington), listed on the NRHP in Whitman County, Washington

== See also ==
- Stephens House (disambiguation)
- William Stevens House (disambiguation)
- Stevens Building (disambiguation)
- Stevens School (disambiguation)
- Stevens High School (disambiguation)
