= Stevens Building =

Stevens Building may refer to:

- Stevens' Building, Worcester, Massachusetts, United States
- Stevens Building (Portland, Oregon)
- Stevens Building (San Antonio, Texas)

== See also ==
- Stevens House (disambiguation)
- Stevens School (disambiguation)
- Stevens High School (disambiguation)
