= William Stevens House =

William Stevens House may refer to:

- William Stevens House (Clinton, Connecticut), listed on the NRHP (National Register of Historic Places)
- William Stevens House (Kenton, Delaware), NRHP-listed

== See also ==
- Stevens House (disambiguation)
