= C. Emlen Urban =

American architect

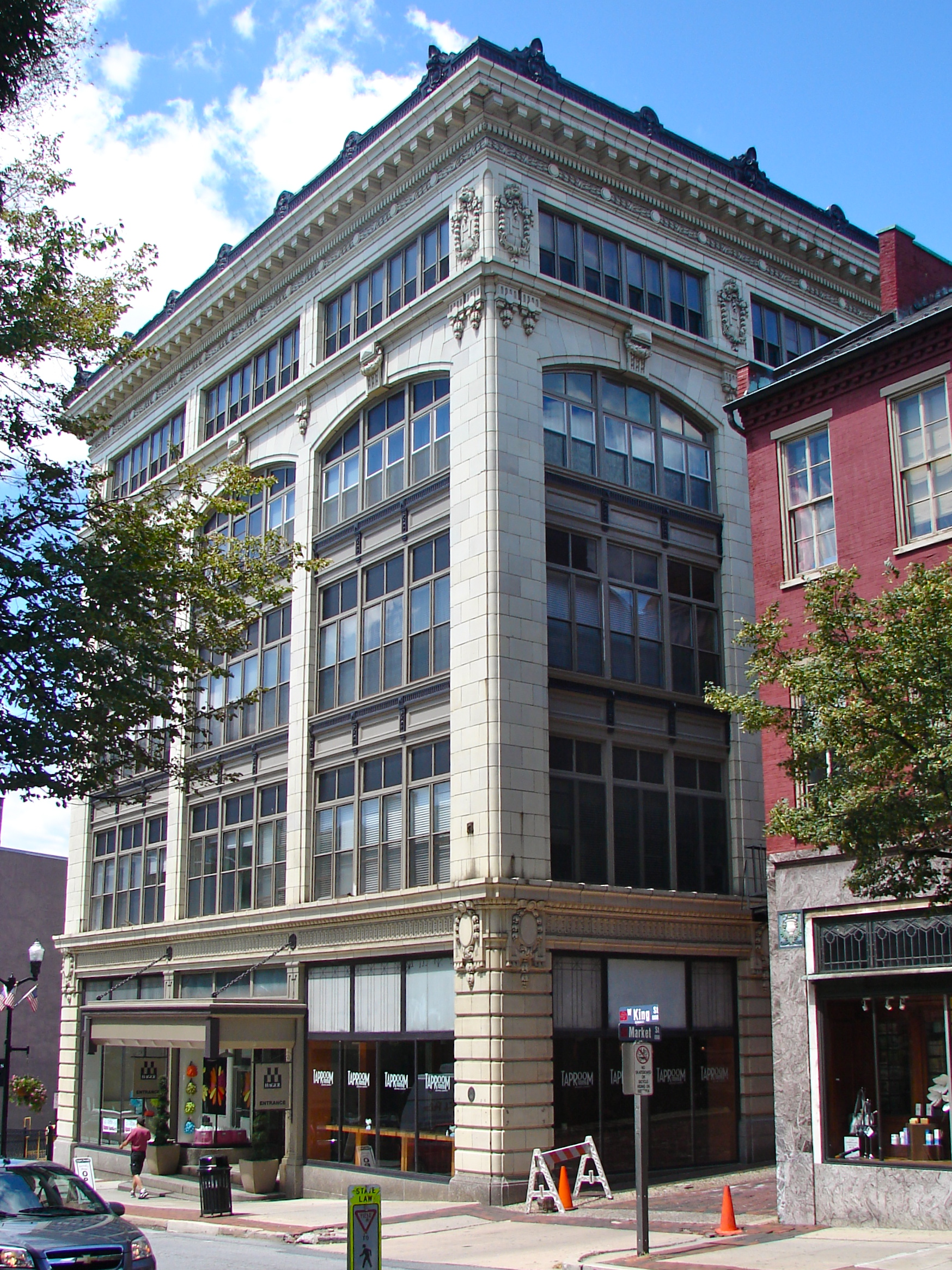
- The Hager Building in downtown Lancaster
- Born: February 26, 1863; Conestoga Township, Lancaster County, Pennsylvania, U.S.
- Died: May 21, 1939 (aged 76); Lancaster, Pennsylvania, U.S.
- Occupation: Architect

Cassius Emlen Urban (February 26, 1863 – May 21, 1939) was a Lancaster, Pennsylvania-based architect. He was the leading architect in Lancaster from the 1890s to the 1920s.

== Biography ==
He was born on February 26, 1863, to Barbara Hebble and Amos S. Urban in Conestoga Township, Lancaster County, Pennsylvania. He graduated from Lancaster’s Boys High School in 1880, and then apprenticed as a draftsman at the E. L. Walter architectural firm in Scranton, Pennsylvania. Emlen also worked in the office of Willis G. Hale in Philadelphia. He returned to Lancaster in 1886. He designed many of Lancaster’s notable buildings including the Farmer's Southern Market on Queen Street in 1888, the Watt & Shand Department Store in 1898, and the Y.M.C.A., Harold's Building, Unitarian Church, and St. James Episcopal Church parish House on Duke Street in 1903. His designs embraced architectural styles as diverse as Queen Anne, Beaux-Arts, and Colonial Revival. His work forms a bridge between the Victorian Era and the Modern Age.

C. Emlen Urban also worked in Hershey, Pennsylvania during its developing period. Urban knew Milton Hershey through Lancaster's Hamilton Club. As Hershey developed, Urban designed all of the main buildings constructed between 1903 and 1926, including the Original Hershey Chocolate Company Offices and factory (1903), Cocoa House (1 Chocolate Avenue) (1905), Hershey Trust Company (1 W. Chocolate Avenue) (1914), Community Building and Hershey Theatre (14 E. Chocolate Avenue) (1915, 1928-1932), and Convention Hall (former Hershey Museum building) (1915).

He died on May 21, 1939, in Lancaster, Pennsylvania.

== Selected works ==
=== Individual listings on the National Register of Historic Places ===
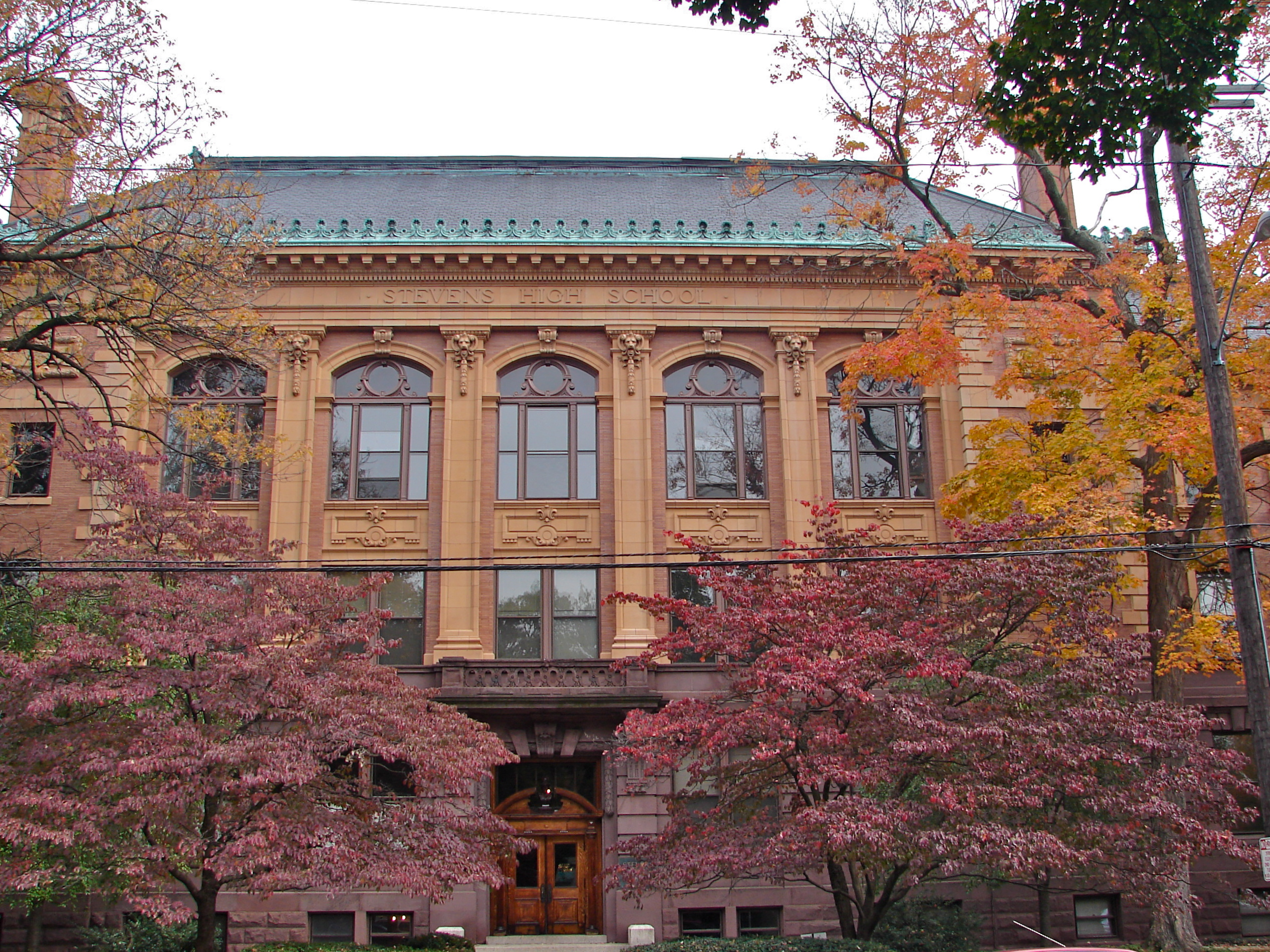
Stevens High School

- 1888: Farmer's Southern Market, Lancaster, Pennsylvania
- 1891: Charlie Wagner's Cafe, Lancaster, Pennsylvania
- 1904-1905: Stevens High School, Lancaster, Pennsylvania
- 1910: Lancaster Trust Company, Lancaster, Pennsylvania
- 1910-1911: Reilly Brothers and Raub Building, Lancaster, Pennsylvania
- 1910-1911: Hager Building, Lancaster, Pennsylvania
- 1911-1912: Kirk Johnson Building, Lancaster, Pennsylvania
- 1915, 1928-1932: Hershey Community Center Building, Hershey, Pennsylvania
- 1924-1925: W. W. Griest Building, Lancaster, Pennsylvania

=== Contributing properties to historic districts ===
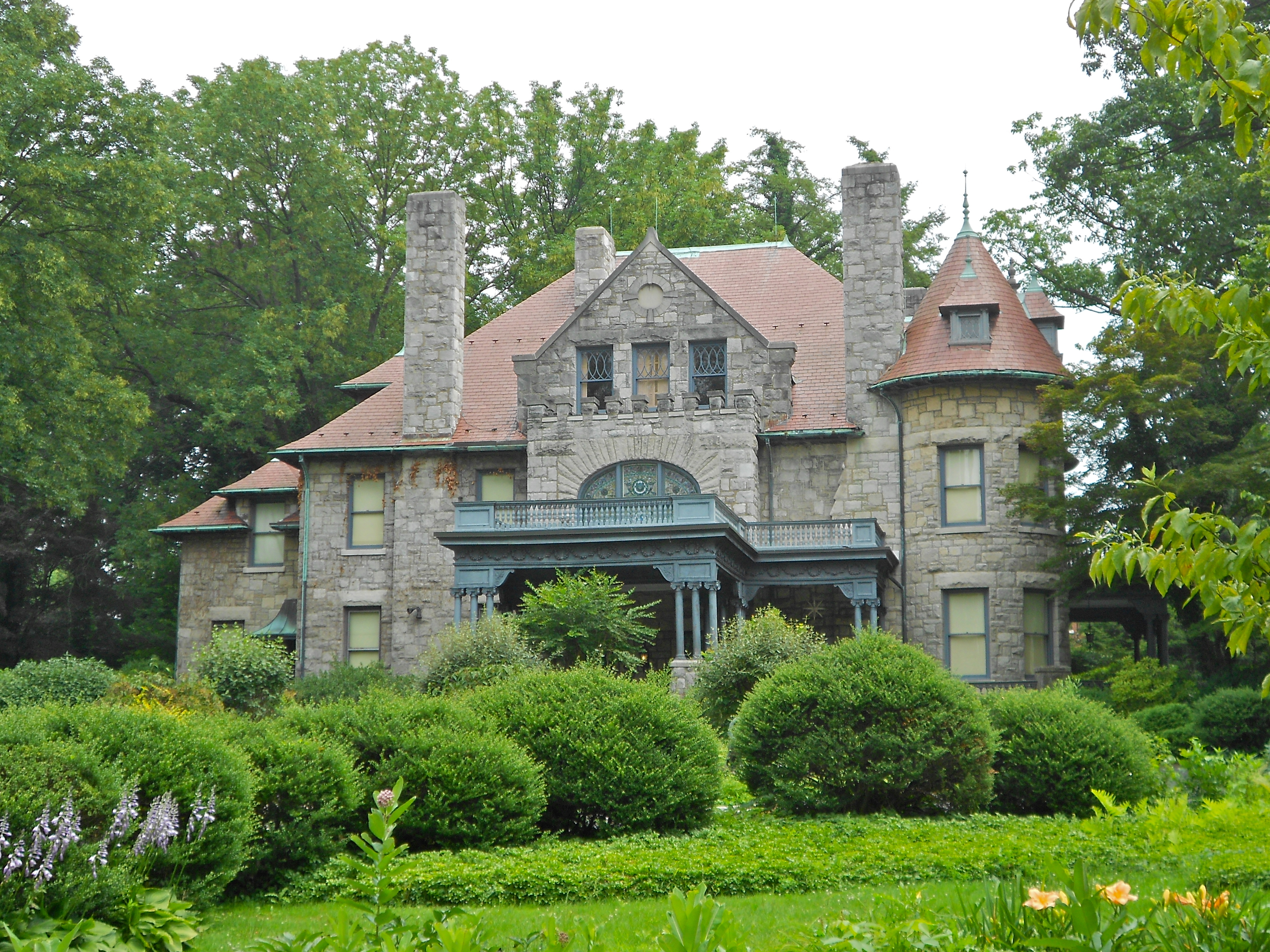
1035 Marietta Avenue in the Northeast Lancaster Historic District

- Lancaster City Historic District
- Ephrata Commercial Historic District
- Manheim Borough Historic District
- Northeast Lancaster Township Historic District

== C. Emlen Urban Awards ==
The Historic Preservation Trust of Lancaster County holds an annual meeting and awards banquet in honor of Urban. The C. Emlen Urban Awards are given to individuals and organizations for their work in protecting and preserving historical structures in Lancaster County.

Past Award Recipients:

- Central Market
- Ephrata National Bank
- Excelsior
- Fulton Elementary School
- Lancaster Ironworks Apartments
- Luca Restaurant
- Nissley Vineyards
- Rock Ford Plantation
- Urban Place
- Wilbur Chocolate Factory
