= Stephens House =

Stephens House may refer to:

- Stephens House, Sycamore, Illinois, a historic house within Sycamore Historic District
- A. J. Stephens House, Chariton, Iowa
- Judge Nelson T. Stephens House, Lawrence, Kansas, listed on the National Register of Historic Places (NRHP) in Douglas County
- Metcalfe-Stephens House, Independence, Kentucky, listed on the NRHP in Kenton County
- Joseph L. Stephens House, Millersburg, Kentucky, listed on the NRHP in Bourbon County
- J. Q. A. Stephens House, Union, Kentucky, listed on the NRHP in Boone County
- Knapp-Stephens House, New Hebron, Mississippi, listed on the NRHP in Lawrence County
- Price-Stephens House, New Hebron, Mississippi, listed on the NRHP in Lawrence County
- Hugh and Bessie Stephens House, Jefferson City, Missouri, NRHP-listed
- Flock-Stephens Farmstead, Long Valley, New Jersey, listed on the NRHP in Morris County
- Stephens Homestead, Mount Olive Township, New Jersey, listed on the NRHP in Morris County
- Avirett-Stephens Plantation, Richlands, North Carolina, NRHP-listed
- James B. Stephens House, Portland, Oregon, NRHP-listed
- Stephens-Lucas House, Pierre, South Dakota, listed on the NRHP in Hughes County
- Lamb-Stephens House, Franklin, Tennessee, formerly NRHP-listed
- Mitchell M. Stephens House, Beaver, Utah, listed on the NRHP in Beaver County

== See also ==
- Stevens House (disambiguation)
