= Thaddeus Stevens School =

Thaddeus Stevens School can refer to at least one of a few different schools in the United States:

- Thaddeus Stevens School of Observation, on the National Register in Philadelphia, PA
- Thaddeus Stevens School (Pittsburgh), a Pittsburgh Landmark
- Thaddeus Stevens School (Washington, D.C.), on the National Register in Washington D.C.
- Stevens High School (Lancaster, Pennsylvania), on the National Register in Steven's hometown of Lancaster
