= East Village Historic District (Amherst, Massachusetts) =

Historic district in Massachusetts, United States

- U.S. National Register of Historic Places
- U.S. Historic district
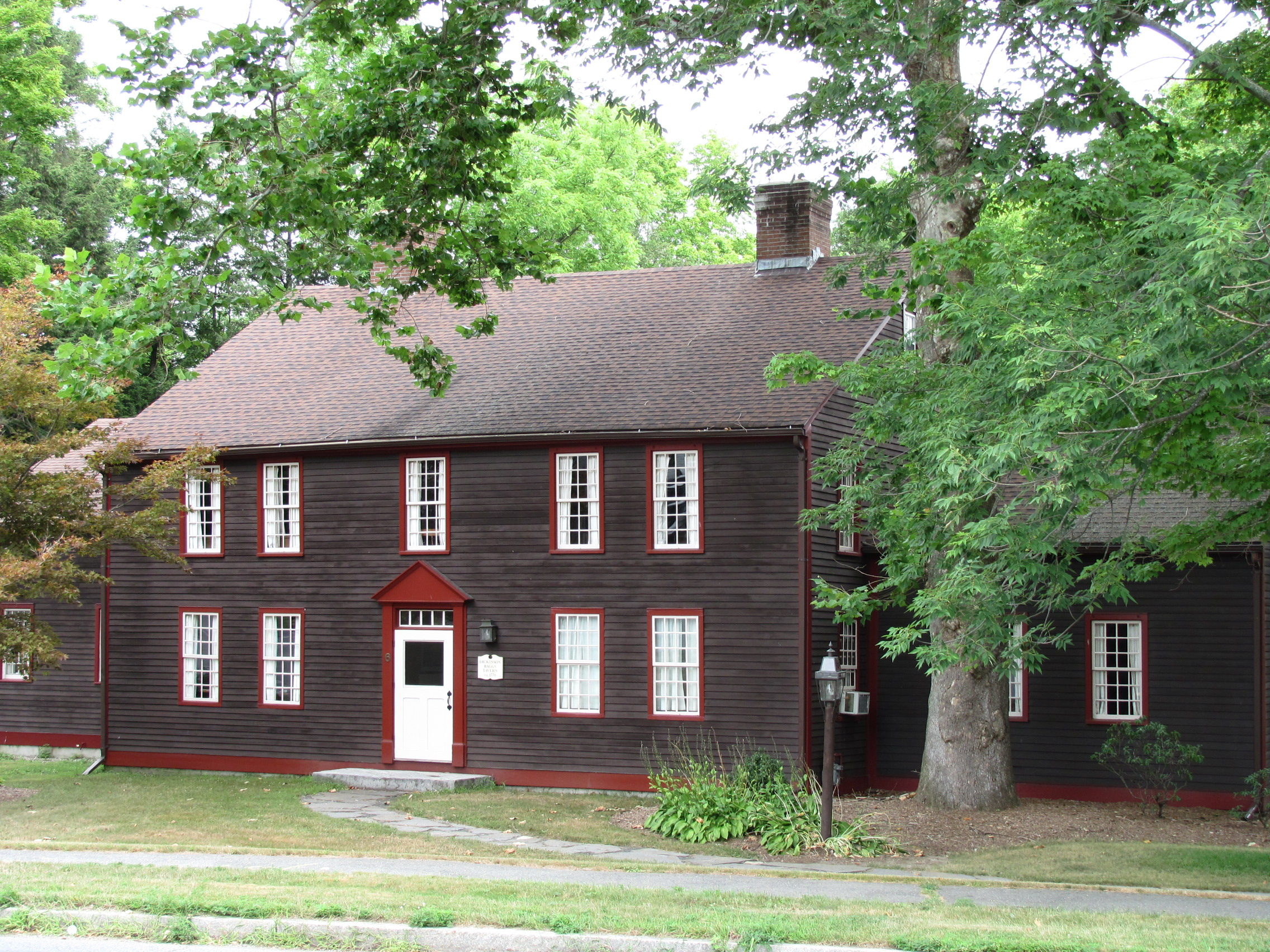
- Dickinson Baggs Tavern

- Location within Massachusetts Location within the United States
- Location: Main, North East, and South East Sts., Amherst, Massachusetts
- Coordinates: 42°22′36″N 72°30′4″W
- Area: 61 acres (25 ha)
- Architectural style: Greek Revival, Georgian, Federal
- NRHP reference No.: 86001408
- Added to NRHP: July 6, 1986

The East Village Historic District is a historic district encompassing the center of the East Village of Amherst, Massachusetts, United States. It includes properties on Main Street, North East Street, and South East Street. The village was one of Amherst's principal civic and commercial centers until the arrival of the railroad in Amherst Center in 1853, and remained a primarily residential area thereafter. The district was listed on the National Register of Historic Places in 1986.

== Description and history ==
Amherst was settled in the early 18th century and incorporated from Hadley in 1759. Its first meeting house was built near what is now Amherst Center, but a second parish was established at East Village in 1783. East Village benefited economically from industry on the Fort River, just to the east of the village center, and flourished in the first half of the 19th century, with a number of cottage industries operating in it or nearby. Amherst Center benefited from the founding of Amherst College in 1821 and by the arrival of the railroad in 1853, which led to its subsequent economic dominance. Growth slowed significantly, with only a few residential buildings and a new school added in the later decades of the 19th century.

The district is a roughly cruciform shape, centered at the junction of Main and East Streets, from which a narrow strip-like green extends southward. It includes 49 buildings, including some of Amherst's oldest surviving structures. Four buildings, three houses and a tavern, date to the 18th century, while there are more numerous examples of Greek Revival and Federal architecture from the first half of the 19th century. Among the buildings in the district are the Second Congregational Church (a Greek Revival structure built in 1839), the Conkey-Stevens House (separately listed on the National Register in 1979), and the Daniel Kellogg House, built in 1758.

== See also ==
- National Register of Historic Places listings in Hampshire County, Massachusetts
