= Kirk Johnson Building =

- U.S. National Register of Historic Places
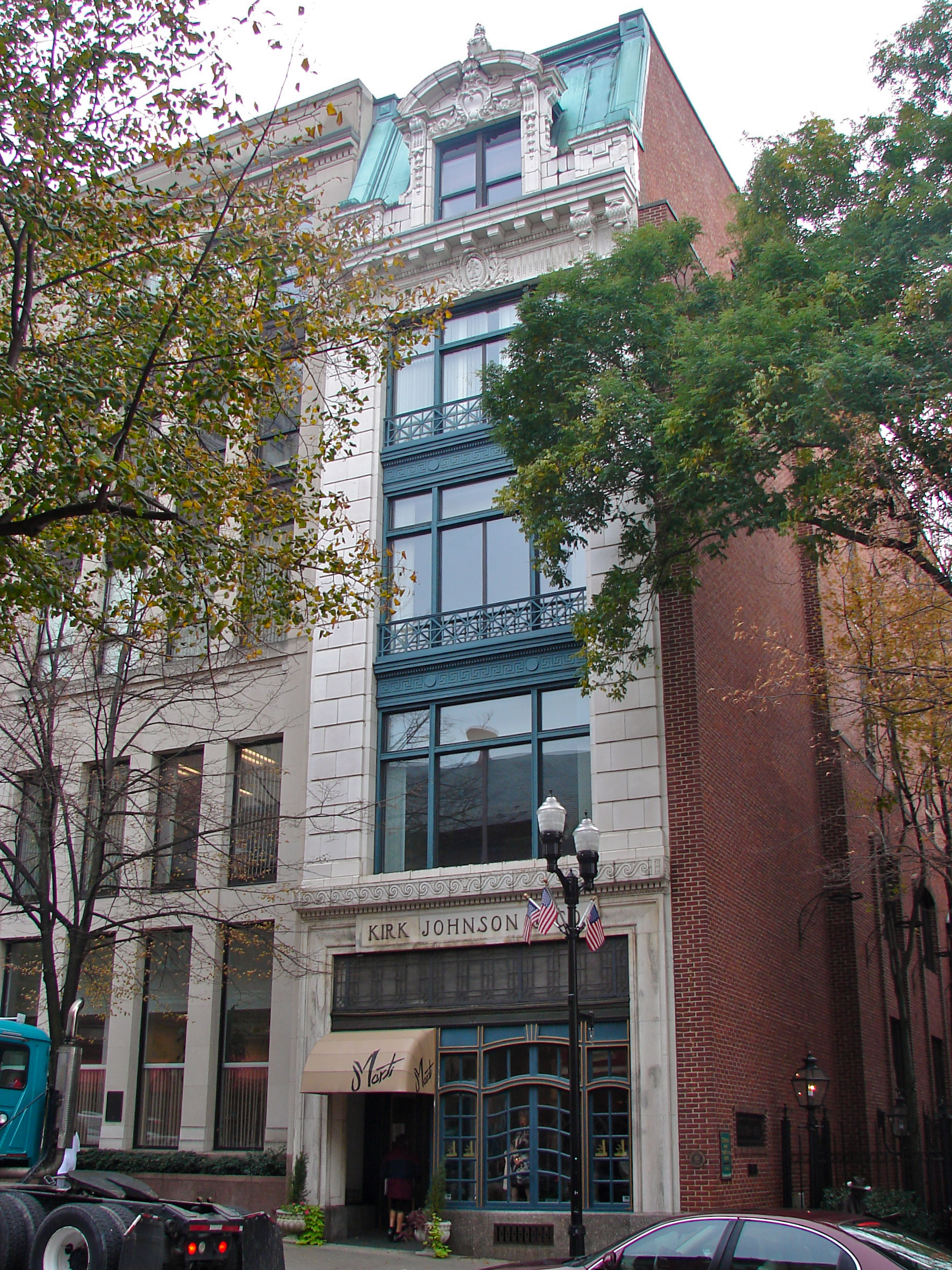
- Kirk Johnson Building, October 2010

- Location within Pennsylvania Location within the United States
- Location: 16-18 W. King St., Lancaster, Pennsylvania
- Coordinates: 40°2′14″N 76°18′24″W
- Area: less than one acre
- Built: 1911-1912
- Architect: Urban, C. Emlen; Eisenberger, W. V.
- Architectural style: Beaux Arts
- NRHP reference No.: 83002252
- Added to NRHP: July 7, 1983

The Kirk Johnson Building is an historic commercial building that is located in Lancaster, Lancaster County, Pennsylvania, United States.

It was added to the National Register of Historic Places in 1980.

== History and architectural features ==
Designed by noted Lancaster architect C. Emlen Urban and erected between 1911 and 1912 to house the Kirk Johnson music store, this historic building is a four-story, narrow, steel-frame structure that is clad in white tile and cut stone, and was created in the Beaux-Arts style. This section of the Kirk Johnson Building measures sixteen feet wide and features a copper-clad mansard roof. The original French-style display windows were restored between 1979 and 1980.
