= Farmer's Southern Market =

- U.S. National Register of Historic Places
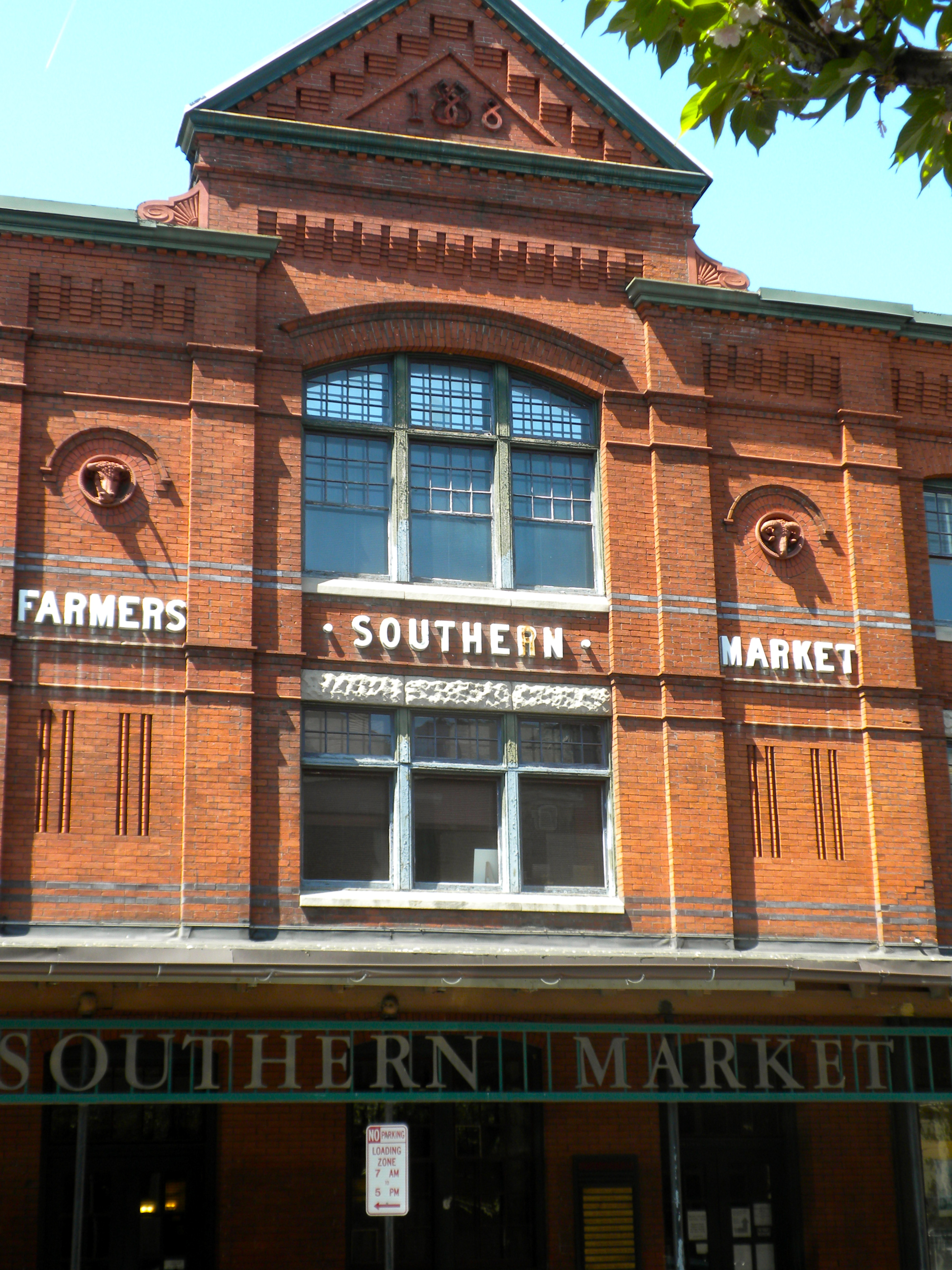
- Southern Market, April 2010

- Location within Pennsylvania Location within the United States
- Location: 106 S. Queen St., Lancaster, Pennsylvania
- Coordinates: 40°2′9″N 76°18′21″W
- Area: 0.6 acres (0.24 ha)
- Built: 1888
- Architect: Burger, J. Adam; Urban, C. Emlen
- Architectural style: Queen Anne
- NRHP reference No.: 86003090
- Added to NRHP: November 10, 1986

Farmer's Southern Market is a historic farmer's market located in downtown Lancaster, Lancaster County, Pennsylvania. It was designed by noted Lancaster architect C. Emlen Urban and built in 1888. It is a brick building consisting of a three-story headhouse and two-story markethouse, in the Queen Anne style. It measures 90 feet wide (7 bays) and 250 feet deep. It features ornamental terra cotta and brickwork and towers. The city closed the market in the late 1980s, and has since housed Lancaster's Visitors Bureau, offices and Council Chambers.

It was listed on the National Register of Historic Places in 1986.
