= Charlie Wagner's Cafe =

- U.S. National Register of Historic Places
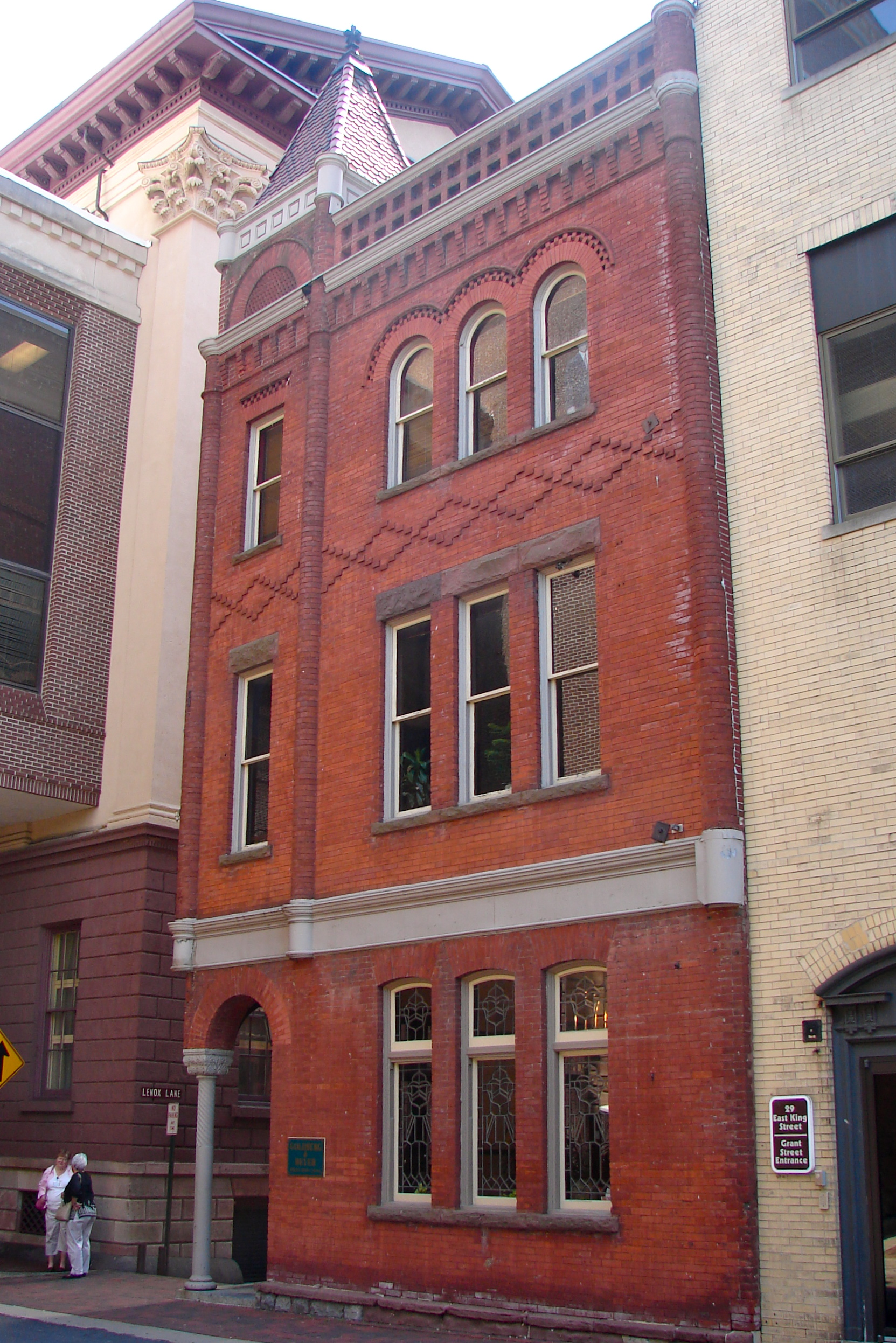
- Charlie Wagner Cafe, August 2011

- Location within Pennsylvania Location within the United States
- Location: 40 E. Grant St., Lancaster, Pennsylvania
- Coordinates: 40°2′20″N 76°18′21″W
- Area: less than one acre
- Built: 1891
- Architects: Urban, C. Emlen
- Architectural style: Romanesque
- NRHP reference No.: 83004223
- Added to NRHP: December 29, 1983

Charlie Wagner's Cafe is a small historic building in the shadow of the Lancaster County Courthouse in Lancaster, Pennsylvania. From 1891 to 1963 the building housed a bar, rather than a cafe, and a few hotel rooms. It has also served as a warehouse for a nearby department store and now houses lawyers' offices.

The building was designed by Lancaster architect C. Emlen Urban. It has three stories designed in the Romanesque Revival style, and surprisingly combines elements of the Queen Anne style. It is constructed of brick with cut-stone and terra cotta elements and pressed metal details. The corner entrance is recessed with a cast-iron column supporting a pair of brick arches. A pyramidal roof also emphasizes the corner, making it appear to be a tower.

It was listed on the National Register of Historic Places in 1983.

== Gallery ==
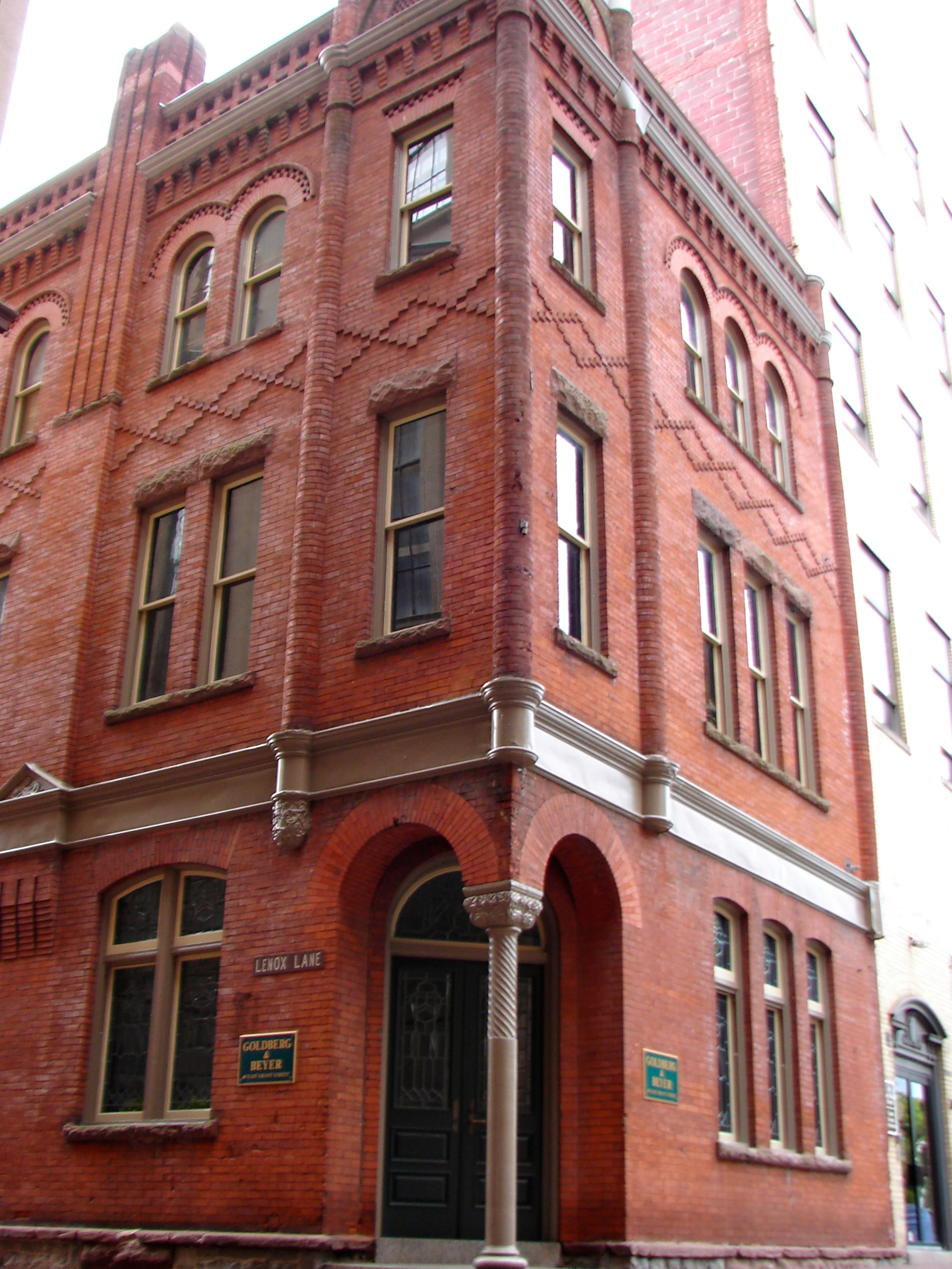
