= Wheatland (James Buchanan House) =

Historic house in Pennsylvania, United States

- James Buchanan House
- U.S. National Register of Historic Places
- U.S. National Historic Landmark
- U.S. Historic district – Contributing property
- Pennsylvania state historical marker
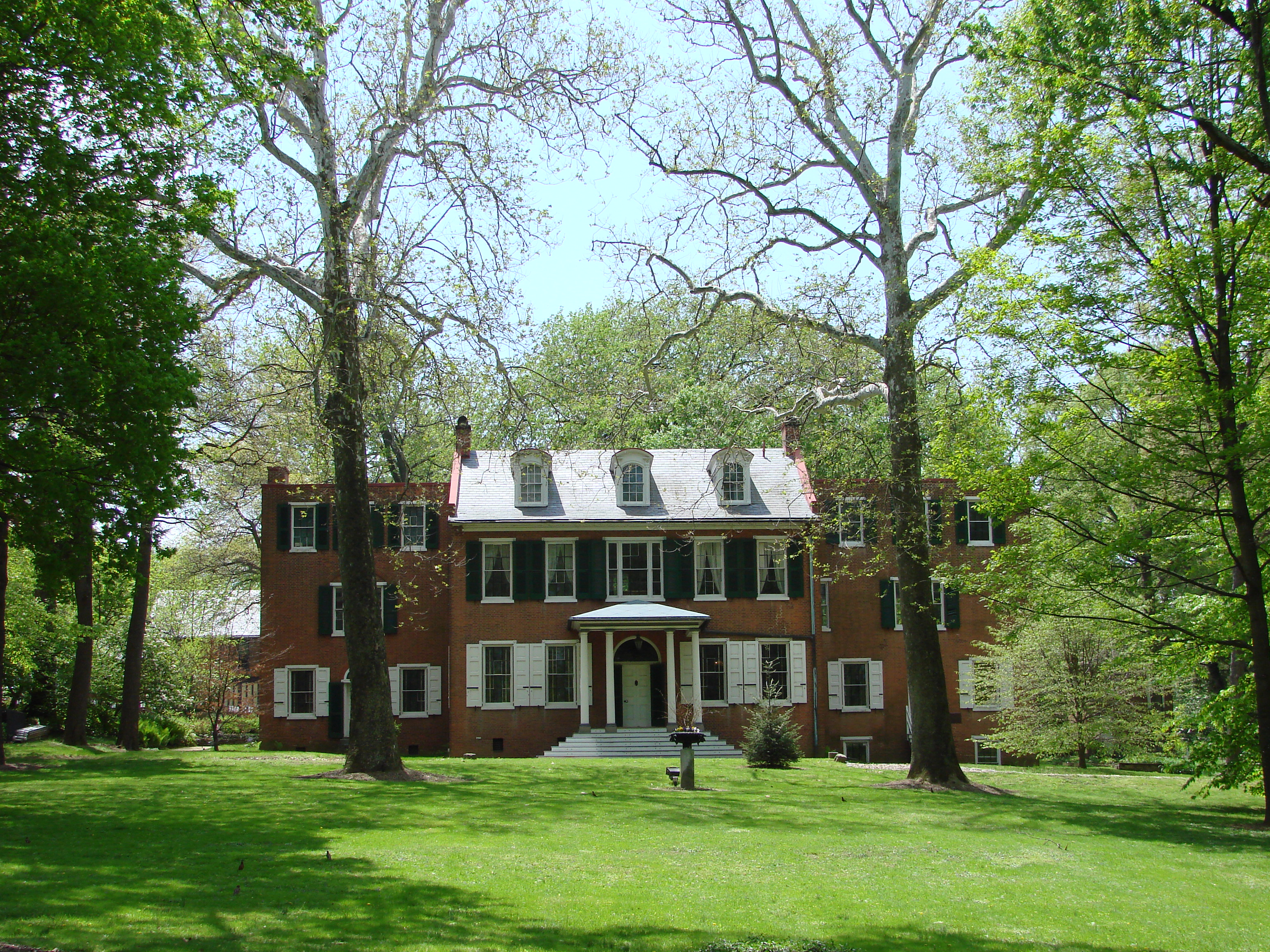
- Wheatland from the front lawn

- Location within Pennsylvania Location within the United States
- Interactive map showing the location of Wheatland
- Location: 1120 Marietta Avenue, Lancaster Township, Lancaster County, Pennsylvania
- Coordinates: 40°2′35.3″N 76°19′50.5″W
- Area: 10 acres (40,470 m^{2})
- Built: 1828
- Architectural style: Federal
- Part of: Northeast Lancaster Township Historic District (ID86000484)
- NRHP reference No.: 66000669

Significant dates
- Added to NRHP: October 15, 1966
- Designated NHL: July 4, 1961
- Designated CP: March 20, 1986
- Designated PHMC: March 17, 1947 and May 14, 1971

Wheatland, or the James Buchanan House, is a brick Federal style house which is located in Lancaster Township, Lancaster County, Pennsylvania, outside of Lancaster, Pennsylvania. It was formerly owned by the 15th president of the United States, James Buchanan.

The house was constructed in 1828 by William Jenkins, a local lawyer. The second owner was Thomas Fuller Potter. He sold it to William M. Meredith in 1845.

Wheatland changed hands again in 1848, when it was purchased by Buchanan. Buchanan occupied the house for the next two decades, except for several years during his ambassadorship in Great Britain and during his presidency. After his death in 1868, Wheatland was inherited by Buchanan's niece, Harriet Lane, who sold it in 1884 to George Willson.

It was inherited by a relative of Willson's in 1929. Wheatland was put up for sale again after the relative died in 1934 and was acquired by a group of people who set up a foundation for the purpose of preserving the house. Wheatland was designated a National Historic Landmark in 1961 and was added to the National Register of Historic Places in 1966. It was designated a contributing property to the Northeast Lancaster Township Historic District in 1980. The foundation and the adjacent historical society merged in 2009.

== Location ==
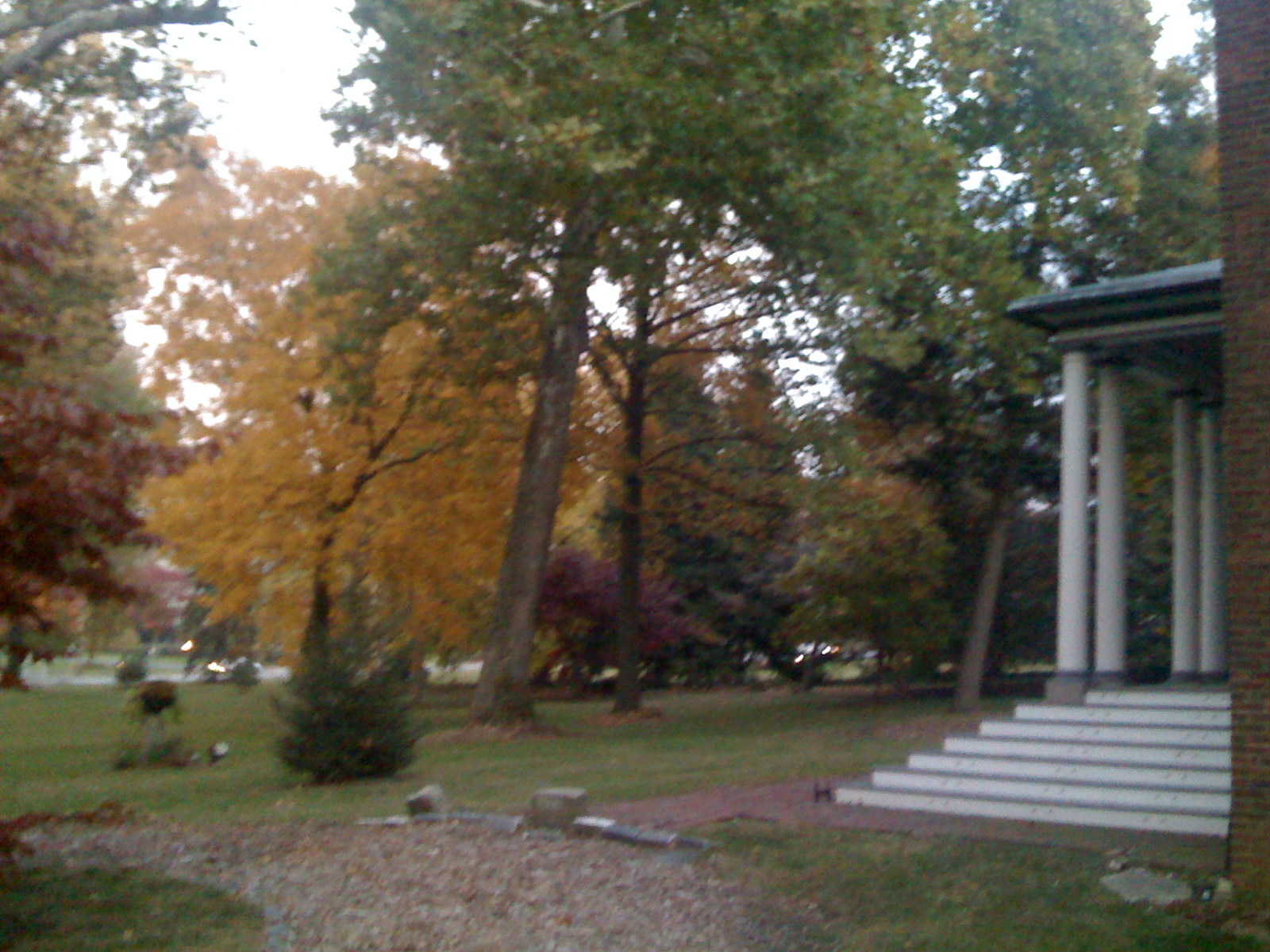
The front grounds of Wheatland

Wheatland is located off Pennsylvania Route 23 (Marietta Avenue) in Lancaster Township, about 1.5 miles (2.4 km) from the center of the city of Lancaster. It is situated on 10 acres (40,470 m^{2}) of land, which it shares with Lancaster County's historical society, at the intersection of Marietta Avenue and President Avenue.

The region was originally inhabited by the Susquehannocks, who were first encountered in what is now Lancaster County by John Smith in 1608. They were also known to early settlers of the area as the "Conestogas", after the creek they resided near. In 1680, William Penn received a charter from Charles II for land to found the Province of Pennsylvania; Penn divided the land into the three counties: Bucks, Chester and Philadelphia. Lancaster County was formed from parts of Chester County on May 10, 1729. Lancaster Township was settled between 1717 and 1720, and was incorporated out of portions of Conestoga Township in 1729. The city of Lancaster was laid out in March 1730 and was incorporated as a borough in August 1742, before being incorporated as a city on March 20, 1818.

== History ==
On November 20, 1824, over 403 acres (1,630,883 m^{2}) of land was turned over to a bank in Lancaster by a farmer. The bank sold 165 acres (1 km^{2}) and 68 square perches (18,513 ft^{2}; 1,720 m^{2}) of that land, on January 29, 1828, for $11,731.87 1/2, (equal to $343,957 today), through the use of a straw man, to William Jenkins, a lawyer and, then, president of said bank. Jenkins had a house constructed on the property and named it "The Wheatlands", either after the surrounding wheatfields or because the site of the house used to be a wheatfield. Jenkins sold 17 acres (68,797 m^{2}) and 25 3/4 square perches (7,010 ft^{2}; 651 m^{2}) of land, including the house, to his son-in-law Thomas Fuller Potter in 1836. William M. Meredith bought the same plot on May 8, 1845, plus an additional 5 acres (20,234 m^{2}), for $6,750, equal to $233,237 today. Meredith used it as primarily a summer house and as a home for his wife and children; Meredith's duties as head of the bar in Philadelphia prevented him from living at Wheatland on a permanent basis.

Wheatland was put up for sale by Meredith and was contacted in June 1848 by Secretary of State James Buchanan, who was interested in the house. The sale of Wheatland was delayed by Meredith, who was not sure whether he really wanted to sell the estate, and by Buchanan, who did not want to force Meredith into making a decision that he might regret. Wheatland was sold in December 1848 at the same price that Meredith had purchased it at; Buchanan moved into the mansion several months later, accompanied by his niece, Harriet Lane, and nephew, James Buchanan "Buck" Henry, and his housekeeper, Esther "Miss Hetty" Parker. Buchanan ran unsuccessfully for the Democratic Party's nomination for President in the 1852 election, however he was appointed the Minister to Great Britain by the newly elected Franklin Pierce. Buchanan did not return to the United States, and to Wheatland, until 1856.

Not long after arriving back at Wheatland, Buchanan was nominated by the Democratic Party to be its candidate for President on June 9, 1856. Buchanan did not tour the country as part of the campaign. Instead, he conducted it from Wheatland as a "front porch campaign". Buchanan won the election and carried all of the Southern states, with most of the votes in the Northern states going to the Republican nominee John C. Frémont. Part of Buchanan's success in the South was his, and the party platform's, support of the Kansas–Nebraska Act. One of the tactics used in the campaign involved lithographs of Wheatland being printed and circulated, primarily in the South, "as a polite way of informing the Southerners that the Democratic candidate, though from the North, had a 'plantation estate' and held a course of life similar to their own."

=== Post-presidency ===
If my successor should be as happy in entering the White House as I shall feel on returning to Wheatland he will indeed be a happy man.

— James Buchanan, letter to William Carpenter
September 13, 1860

During his presidency, Buchanan returned to Wheatland sporadically and never for very long. He retired to Wheatland in 1861, after the election of Abraham Lincoln and the end of his term as President. Buchanan died in the main bedroom on the second floor in Wheatland on June 1, 1868. Thousands of people attended Buchanan's funeral and the procession from Wheatland to the Woodward Hill Cemetery on June 4. The estate was inherited by Harriet Lane, who used it as a summer house. After both of Lane's sons died—one in 1881 and the other a year later—and a few weeks after her husband died, Lane sold Wheatland in 1884 to George Willson.

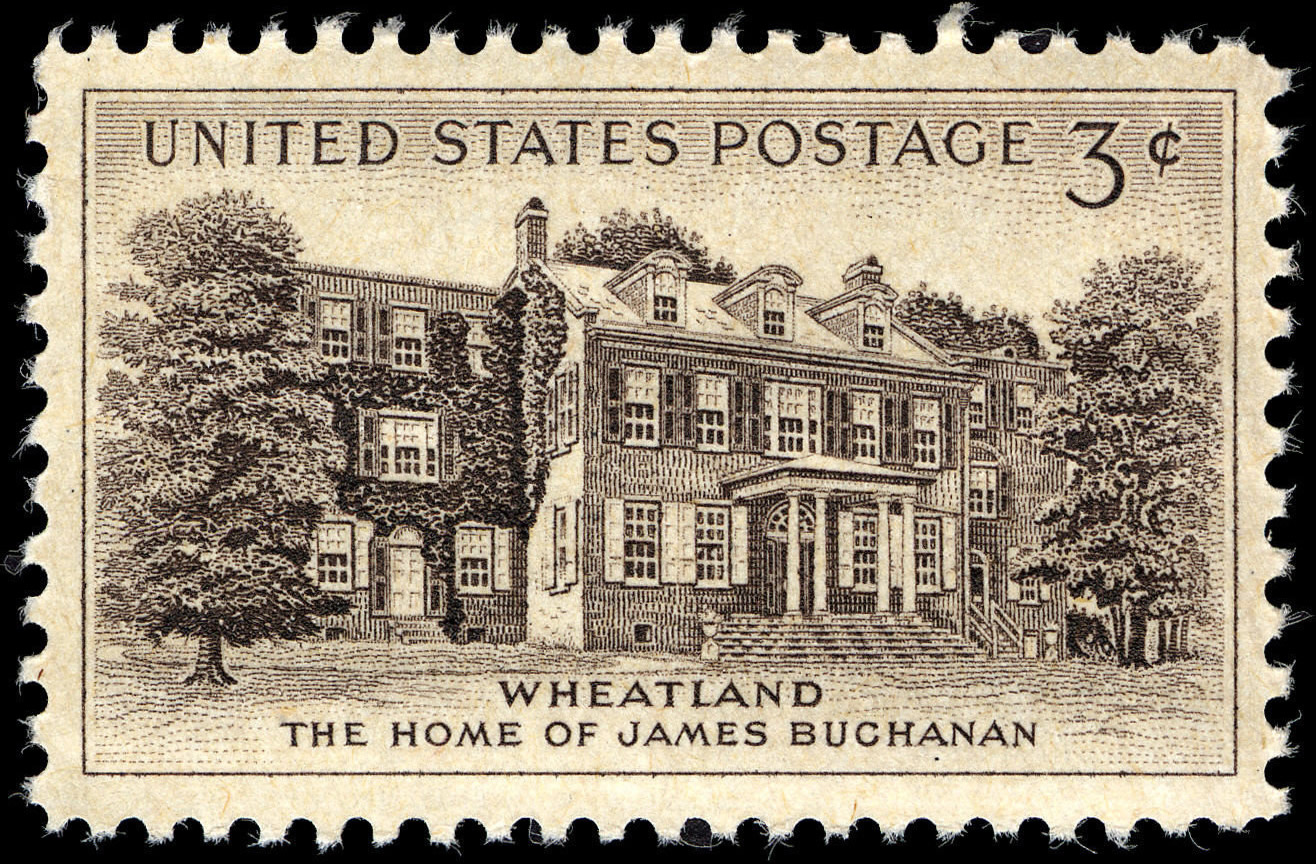
Three-cent postage stamp commemorating the centennial of Buchanan's election, in 1956.

Wheatland was inherited by Mary Willson Rettew, a cousin of George Willson, after he died of a heart attack in 1929. Rettew died in 1934 and, left a will stipulating "the establishment of 'The Willson Memorial Building'" to preserve the family's heirlooms. Her will also requested that the building be occupied by the Lancaster County Historical Society, which had been founded in 1880. Wheatland, along with 4.25 acres (17,199.14 m^{2}) of land, were put up for sale by the executors of the will. The Junior League of Lancaster founded the "James Buchanan Foundation for the Preservation of Wheatland" in 1935 with the purpose of raising funds to buy Wheatland. Wheatland was sold to the Foundation for $40,000 (equal to $928,058 today) on February 27, 1936. It was opened to the public on May 5, 1936 and was dedicated "as a new presidential shrine, taking its place with Mount Vernon, Monticello and The Hermitage," in October 1937. Wheatland was designated a National Historic Landmark on July 4, 1961 and listed on the National Register of Historic Places on October 15, 1966. Wheatland became a contributing property to the Northeast Lancaster Township Historic District on March 20, 1986. The James Buchanan Foundation and the neighboring Lancaster County Historical Society were merged in 2009 to form LancasterHistory.org.

== Architecture and decor ==
Wheatland is a Federal style house made of brick. As no documents on the actual construction are known to exist, the person or persons responsible for the design of Wheatland have remained anonymous. However, the architecture of Wheatland, as well as its location on the property, indicates someone who was skilled in classical architecture. Design elements, like various lunette windows, also show the influence of various architectural guidebooks that were prevalent in the early 19th century.

The interior of Wheatland is furnished as it would have been in the mid-19th Century, with most of the furniture being original to the house. As Wheatland has never been significantly altered or remodeled, other than the installation of modern lighting and heating, it provides an accurate view of the lifestyle in the Victorian era.

The house is made up of a 2 1/2-story, "bilaterally symmetrical", central section, flanked by two, three-story wings set back from the main facade. The roofs of both wings are flat and sloping towards the rear of the house; the northern wing also a "pent roof", a sloped, shingled roof between the first floor and second floor windows, on the rear. The front entrance to Wheatland is sheltered by a portico supported by Tuscan order columns, while the rear entrance is on a veranda.

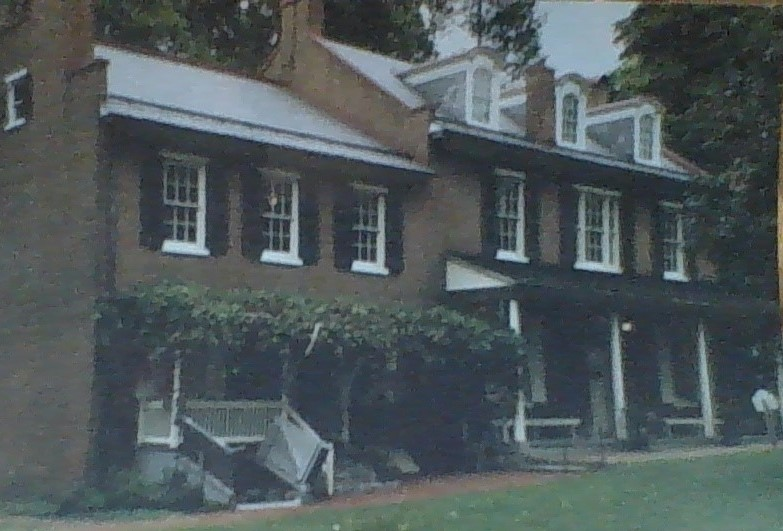
Rear view of James Buchanan's home, Wheatland

=== Interior ===
Both of the main entrances into Wheatland open onto a T-shaped hallway. The main portion of the hall is 42 feet (13 m) long and 8 feet (2 m) wide, while the cross-hall is 34 by 8 feet (10 m × 2 m). It is covered with an oilcloth flooring that was decorated with "geometric squares to imitate tile"—painting one material to resemble another, more expensive one that was popular in the Victorian era. The original cloth was covered with a modern, red carpet up until 1990; it has since been overlaid with an identical, reproduction covering.

On the first floor are located the parlor, the library, two dining rooms, and the kitchen. One of the dining rooms is located in the western wing, off of the hallway, and was primarily used by the family for smaller meals like breakfast or tea. The kitchen is also in the wing, directly adjacent to the dining room. The other dining room, located in the front western side of the main house, was used only for formal dinners and as the sitting room where the men would converse after dinner. The fireplace in the room was enclosed in marble when Buchanan bought Wheatland and had a furnace installed. Across the hall, on the other side of the main house is the parlor, where the women guests would congregate after dinner. The library is located off the hallway in the east wing. The woodwork, doors, a bookcase, and a bookshelf built into the wall were grained to resemble oak. The shelves in the bookshelf no longer exist; but, the backboard of the bookshelf is visible, as is the plaster wall made to resemble wood. Two mahogany bookcases, flanking the fireplace in the library, were furnished by Jenkins and having been sold to each successive owner by the previous one. The library was primarily used by Buchanan as the place to meet with guests.

The second floor is reached by means of an elliptical stairway in the cross-hall. Embedded into the newel post at the base of the stairs is glass "peace stone", symbolizing the owners' "peace of mind" after having paid off the mortgage. The living quarters for the inhabitants of Wheatland were located on the second floor. A bathroom, complete with bathtub, shower and a bidet, was installed in the west wing when the Willsons bought Wheatland in 1884. The third floor was primarily used as servants' quarters and has been left unrestored.

=== Grounds ===
Originally constituting 22 acres (89,031 m^{2}), the grounds surrounding Wheatland were incrementally sold until only 4.25 acres (17,199.14 m^{2}) remained when it was listed on the National Register of Historic Places. The merger in 2009, however, included the 5.75 acres (23,269.42 m^{2}) given to the historical society in 1934; the total of the two parcels is almost half of Wheatland's original property.

On the grounds, behind Wheatland, stand a privy, a smokehouse, and a carriage house. A stable used to stand on the property but was replaced by the carriage house in the late 1880s; an icehouse also no longer exists. The carriage house, today, houses meeting and reception space.

Wheatland is open to the public Monday-Saturday from mid-January through mid-November, with tours available hourly.

== See also ==
- Buchanan's Birthplace State Park
- List of National Historic Landmarks in Pennsylvania
- List of residences of presidents of the United States
- National Register of Historic Places listings in Lancaster County, Pennsylvania
- Presidential memorials in the United States

== Sources ==
- Brubaker, Jack (February 26, 2009). "Now they are one". Lancaster New Era. pp. B1–B2.
- Butler, Joseph Thomas (February 1957). Wheatland, 1848–1868, the home of James Buchanan (M.A. thesis). University of Delaware.
- Cahalan, Sally Smith (1989). At Home with James Buchanan. Ephrata: Science Press.
- Cahalan, Sally Smith (1988). James Buchanan and his Family at Wheatland. Lancaster: James Buchanan Foundation.
- Diffenderffer, F. R (October 2, 1865). "Indian Tribes of Lancaster County". Papers Read Before the Lancaster County Historical Society. I (3). Lancaster: Lancaster County Historical Society: 85–88.
- Greenwood, Richard (January 14, 1975). "Wheatland". National Register of Historic Places Inventory Form—Nomination Form. National Park Service.
- Hottenstein, JoAnne; Welch, Sibyl (1965). "Lancaster County". Incorporation dates of Pennsylvania municipalities (PDF). Harrisburg: Bureau of Municipal Affairs, Pennsylvania Department of Internal Affairs. pp. 77–78.
- Klein, Philip Shriver (January 1936). The Story of Wheatland. Lancaster: Junior League of Lancaster.
- Worner, William Federick (May 4, 1928). "Unpublished Letters of James Buchanan, 15th President of the United States". Papers Read Before the Lancaster County Historical Society. XXXII (5). Lancaster: Lancaster County Historical Society: 67–72.
