= Manheim Borough Historic District =

Historic district in Pennsylvania, United States

- U.S. National Register of Historic Places
- U.S. Historic district
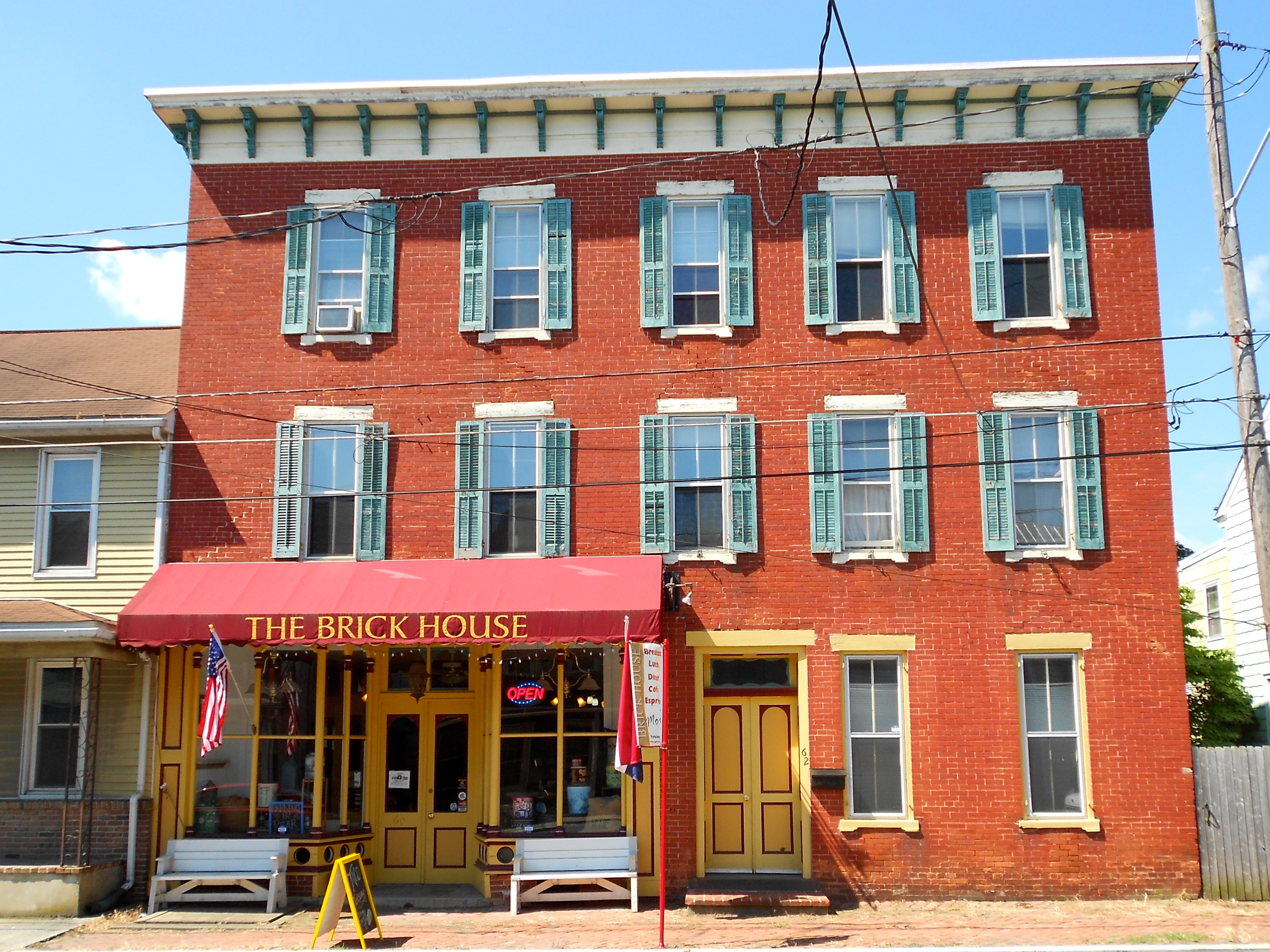
- 62 Main Street

- Location within Pennsylvania Location within the United States
- Location: Roughly bounded by Colebrook, Laurel, Fuller Dr., And Fulton Sts., Manheim, Pennsylvania
- Coordinates: 40°09′45″N 76°23′45″W
- Area: 230 acres (93 ha)
- Architect: Urban, C. Emlen; Furness, Frank
- Architectural style: Italianate, Stick/eastlake, et al.
- NRHP reference No.: 00000058
- Added to NRHP: February 4, 2000

The Manheim Borough Historic District is a national historic district that is located in Manheim, Lancaster County, Pennsylvania.

It was listed on the National Register of Historic Places in 2000.

== History and architectural features ==
This district includes 787 contributing buildings and one contributing site that are located in the central business district and surrounding residential areas of Manheim. The majority of the buildings are residential and include notable examples of the Italianate and Eastlake movement architectural styles and buildings that were designed by noted Lancaster architect C. Emlen Urban. The buildings date from circa 1762 to 1949, with the majority built between 1860 and 1930. Notable non-residential buildings include the Stiegel/Arntz Building (1865-1875), Kready's Store, Manheim Railroad Station (1881), Manheim National Bank (1924), Keystone National Bank (1925), Eisenlohr Cigar Factory, Fuller Factory, Bond Caster and Wheel Corporation, Zion Evangelical Lutheran Church (1891), and Hope Hose Company Firehouse (1904). The contributing site is the Zion Evangelical Lutheran Church cemetery.
