= Hershey Community Center Building =

- U.S. National Register of Historic Places
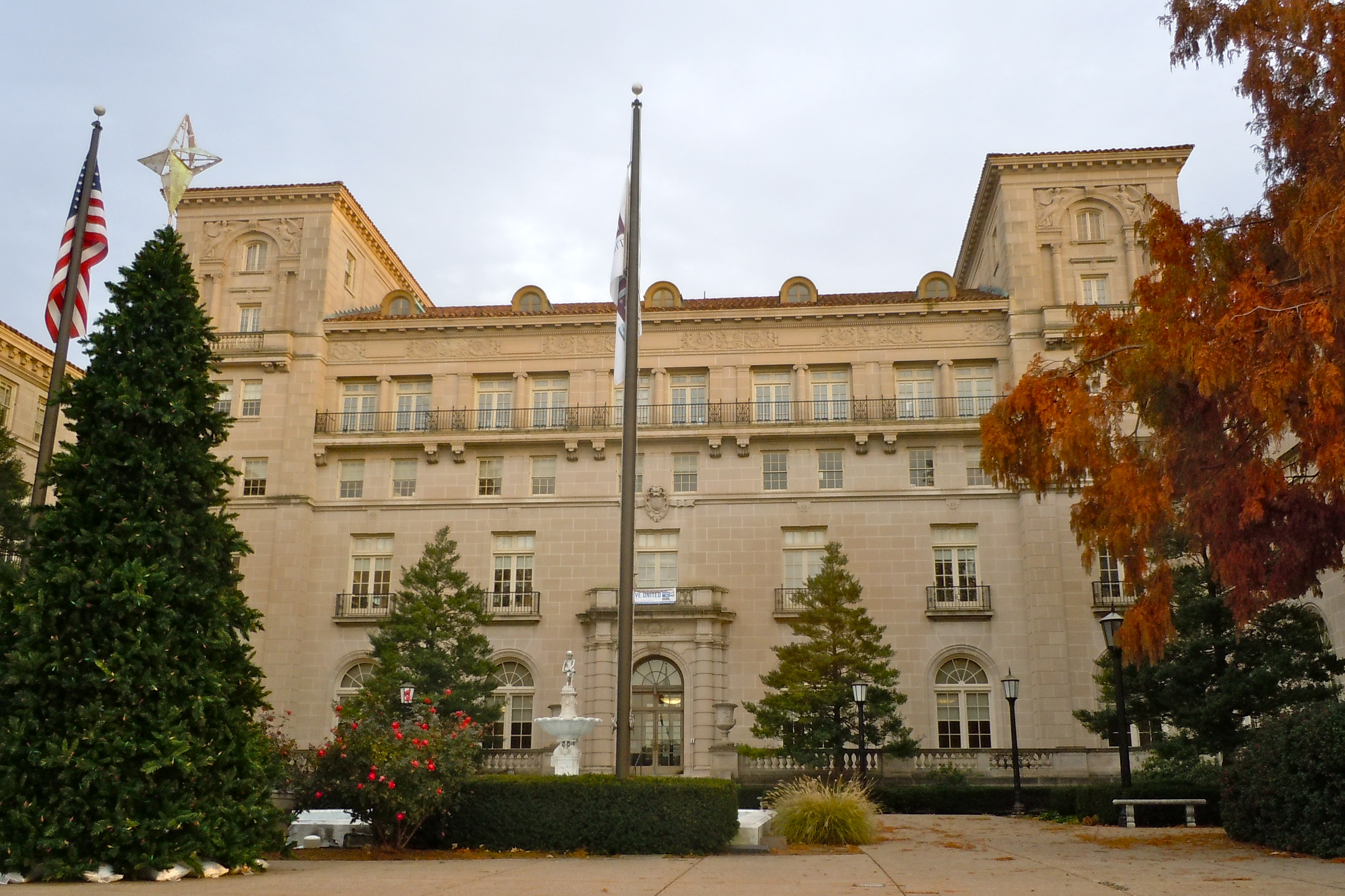
- Hershey Community Center Building, November 2011

- Location within Pennsylvania Location within the United States
- Location: 2 Chocolate Ave., Hershey, Pennsylvania
- Coordinates: 40°17′7″N 76°38′56″W
- Area: 2.6 acres (1.1 ha)
- Built: 1932-1933
- Architect: Paul Philippe Cret
- Architectural style: Mission/Spanish Revival
- NRHP reference No.: 80003483
- Added to NRHP: October 15, 1980

The Hershey Community Center Building is an historic building which is located in Hershey, Dauphin County, Pennsylvania, United States.

It was added to the National Register of Historic Places in 1980.

== History and architectural features ==
Designed by architect Paul Philippe Cret (1876-1945), under a general plan by Milton S. Hershey (1857-1945), the Hershey Community Center Building was erected between 1932 and 1933. Plans for a community theater and center were originally drawn-up by C. Emlen Urban in 1915.

The Hershey Community Center Building is a five-story building, encompassing 190,699 square feet. It is shaped like a distended "E," with an open court in the front center and sun porches on three sides.

The building is faced in Indiana limestone, and houses a large theater, the Hershey Theatre, which is 51,525 square feet (4,787 m^{2}), and small theater, which is 5,535 square feet (514 m^{2}), along with a variety of recreational facilities including a gymnasium, swimming pool, game rooms, locker rooms, and showers.

The building also houses a library, which is 6,640 square feet (617 m^{2}) and dormitory space, which is 15,970 square feet (1,484 m^{2}).
