= Hager Building =

- U.S. National Register of Historic Places
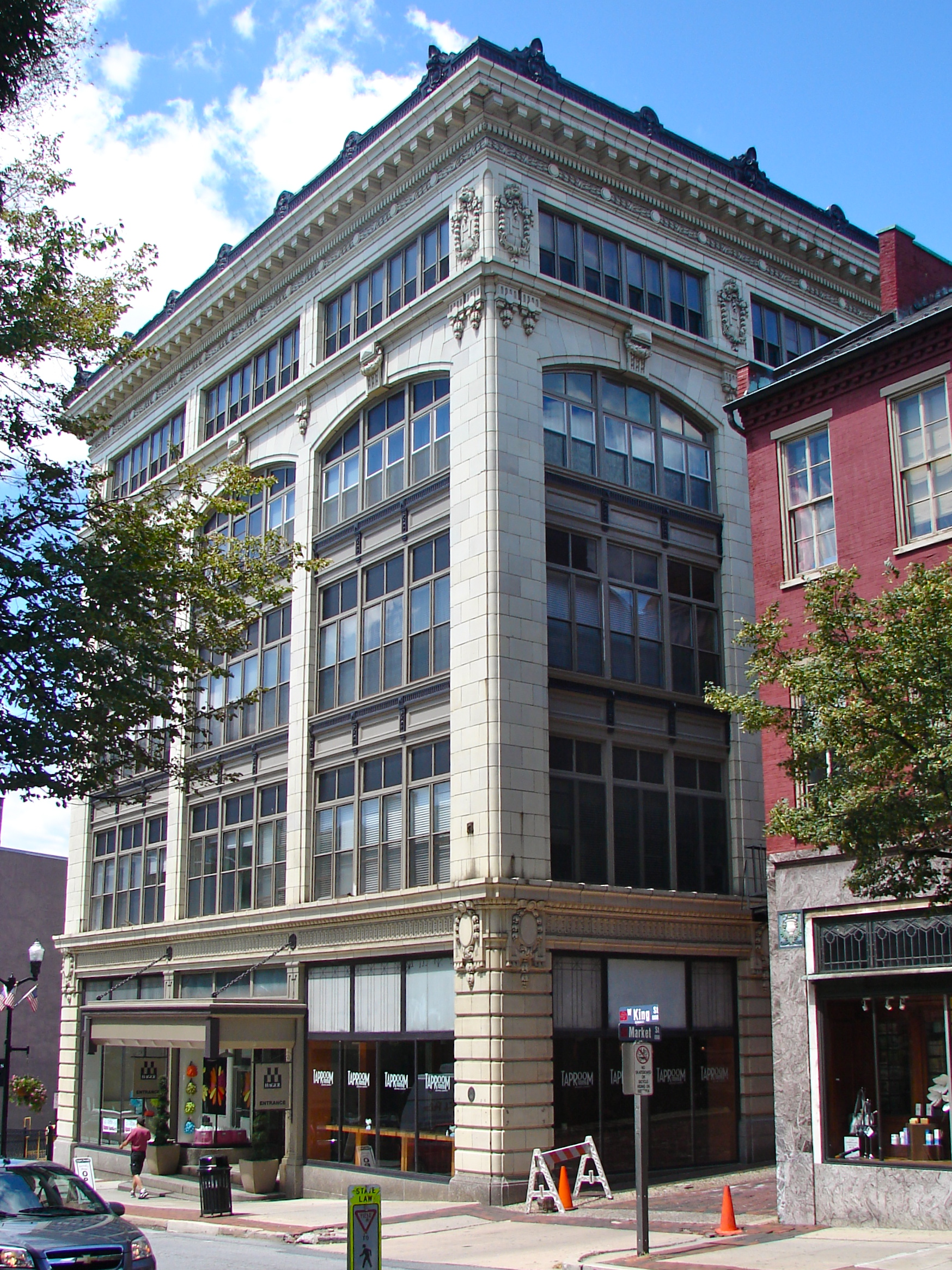
- Hager Building, October 2011

- Location within Pennsylvania Location within the United States
- Location: 25 W. King St., Lancaster, Pennsylvania
- Coordinates: 40°2′17″N 76°18′26″W
- Area: 0.4 acres (0.16 ha)
- Built: 1910–1911
- Architect: C. Emlen Urban
- Architectural style: French Renaissance Revival
- NRHP reference No.: 79002255
- Added to NRHP: October 16, 1979

The Hager Building is an historic commercial building which is located in Lancaster, Lancaster County, Pennsylvania. Designed by noted Lancaster architect C. Emlen Urban, it was built between 1910 and 1911.

It was added to the National Register of Historic Places in 1979.

== History and architectural features ==
The Hager Building is a five-story, three-bay-by-five-bay, steel frame structure clad in terra cotta. It was designed in a French Renaissance Revival style. This section of the Hager Building measures sixty-three feet by one hundred and one feet. The overall dimensions of the building are two hundred forty feet, six inches, by sixty-three feet. This includes the central warehouse section, built between 1860 and 1890, and a brick northern extension that was built in 1923. The building once housed the Hager Brothers Department Store.

== Gallery ==
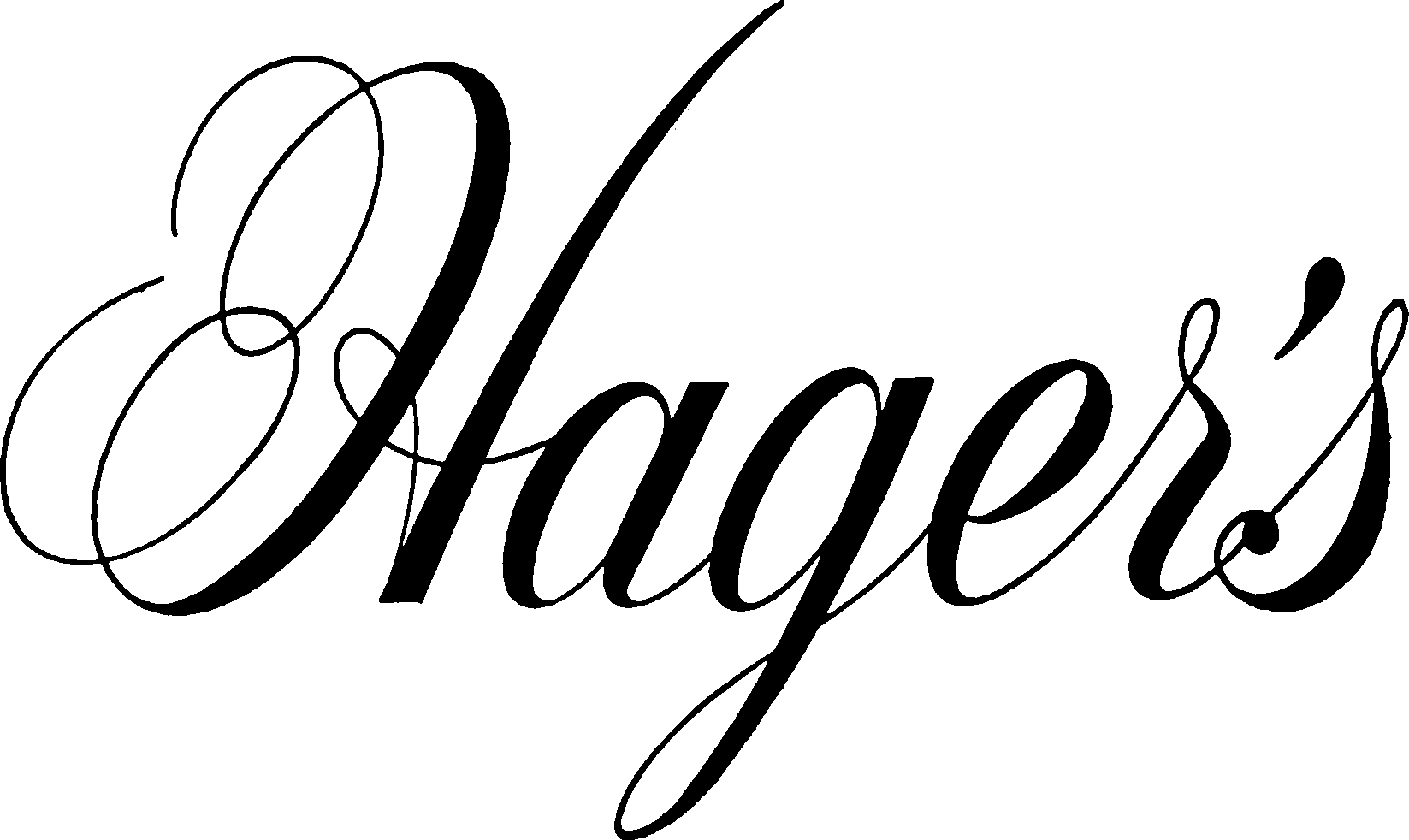
Hager's Department Store logo
