= Stephens Homestead =

- U.S. National Register of Historic Places
- New Jersey Register of Historic Places
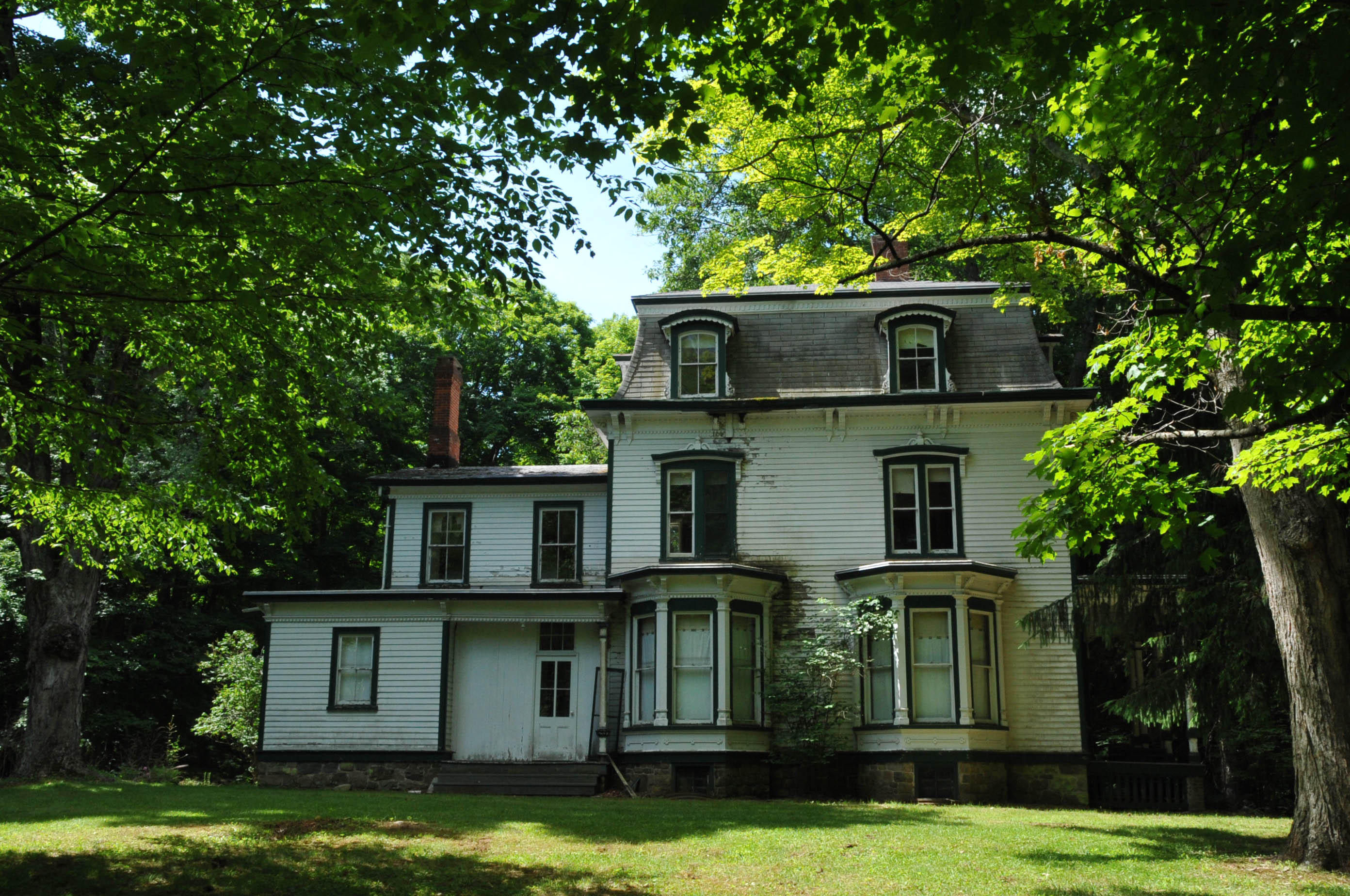

- Location within Morris County, New Jersey Location within New Jersey Location within the United States
- Location: 800 Willow Grove Road, Stephens State Park, Mount Olive Township, New Jersey
- Coordinates: 40°52′19″N 74°48′23.5″W
- Area: 5 acres (2.0 ha)
- Built: c. 1865
- Architectural style: Second Empire
- NRHP reference No.: 12001178
- NJRHP No.: 4824

Significant dates
- Added to NRHP: January 14, 2013
- Designated NJRHP: October 25, 2012

The Stephens Homestead is a historic farmhouse at 800 Willow Grove Road in Stephens State Park in Mount Olive Township in Morris County, New Jersey, United States. Built around 1865, the house was added to the National Register of Historic Places on January 14, 2013, for its significance in agriculture and architecture.

== History and description ==
The Second Empire style farmhouse was built by businessman and farmer Amzi Chapman Stephens (1826–1910). The two-story frame building has an attic story with a mansard roof. The property, located along the Musconetcong River, also includes an outhouse, a well house, and a 19th-century lime kiln. When Stephens died in 1910, the property was inherited by his sons. In 1937, they gave the state 230 acres (93 ha) to form Stephens State Park. They retained rights to the homestead, and Margaret Stephens Zimmermann (1927–2007), daughter of one of the brothers, used it as a summer residence until her death, when it was given to the state.

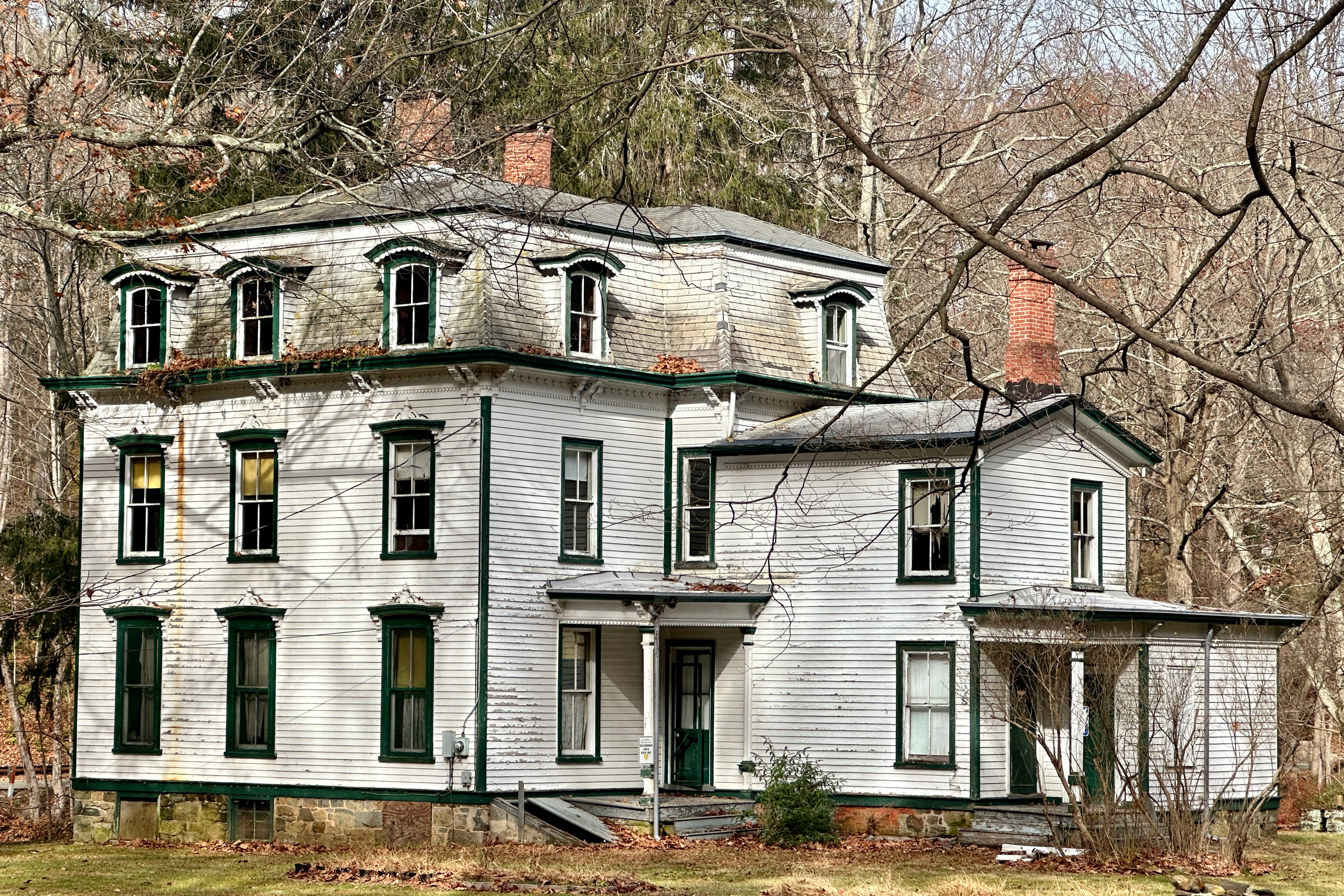
View looking north

== See also ==
- National Register of Historic Places listings in Morris County, New Jersey
