= Lancaster Trust Company =

- U.S. National Register of Historic Places
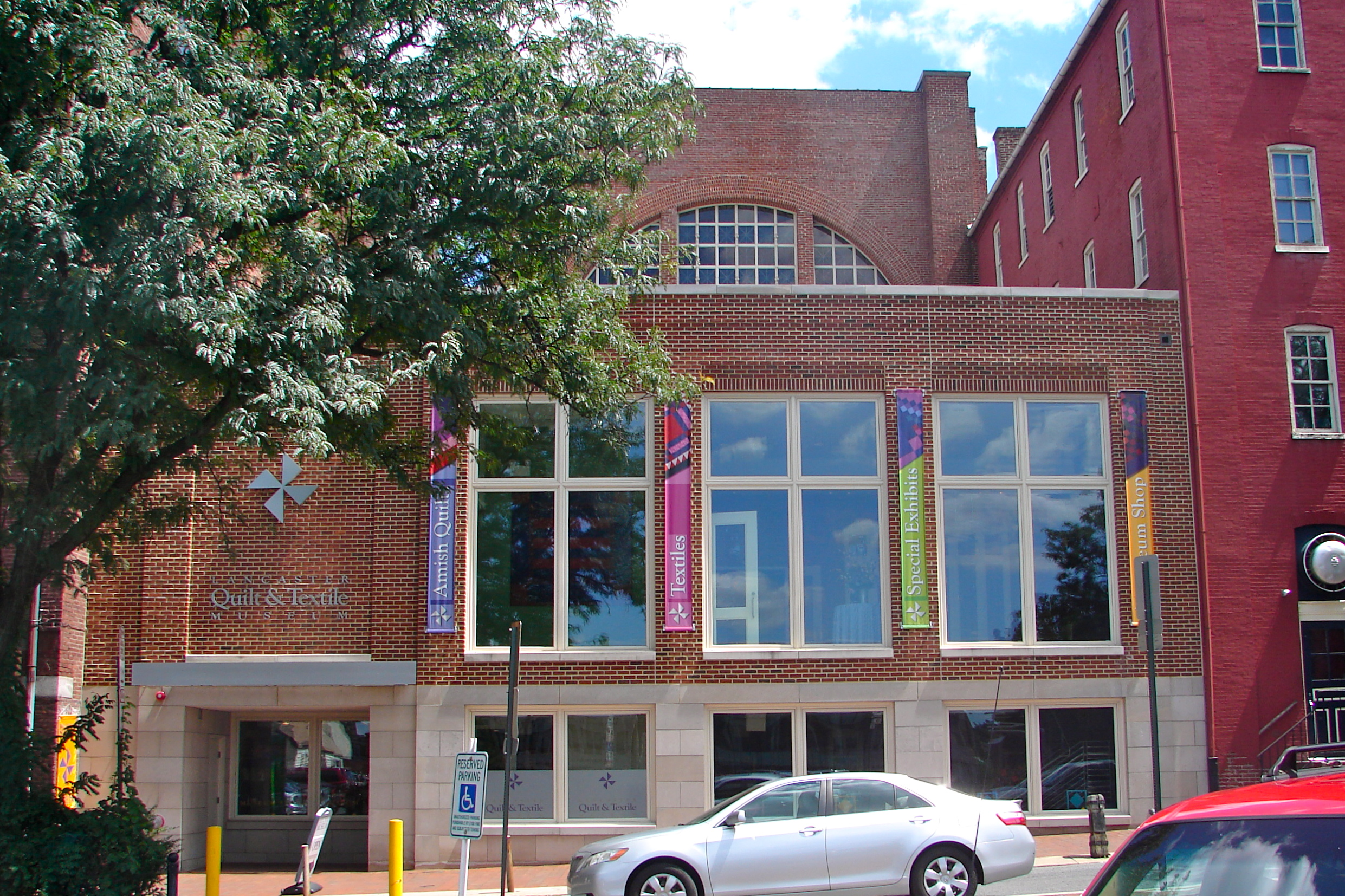
- Lancaster Trust Company, August 2011

- Location within Pennsylvania Location within the United States
- Location: 37–41 N. Market St., Lancaster, Pennsylvania
- Coordinates: 40°2′17″N 76°18′28″W
- Area: 0.2 acres (0.081 ha)
- Built: 1911–1912
- Built by: Herman Wohlsen
- Architect: C. Emlen Urban
- Architectural style: Beaux Arts
- NRHP reference No.: 83004221
- Added to NRHP: November 3, 1983

The Lancaster Trust Company is an historic bank building in Lancaster, Lancaster County, Pennsylvania, United States.

It was added to the National Register of Historic Places in 1983.

== History and architectural features ==
Designed in 1910 by C. Emlen Urban, it was built between 1911 and 1912. Created in the Beaux-Arts style, it was added to the front of an existing five-story building that was built between 1889 and 1890. This historic structure encompasses the Main Banking Room, Board Room, and vaults, with a basement, lavatories, and passageways, and sits on a limestone foundation. The facade is made from red brick. The bank failed in 1932, and the building remained vacant for the next fifty years.

It was added to the National Register of Historic Places in 1983. For several years the building hosted the Lancaster Quilt and Textile Museum, which featured late 19th–20th century Amish quilts indigenous to the area.

== The Trust Performing Arts Center ==
In 2013, the building became the home of The Trust Performing Arts Center, which is run by Lancaster Bible College's Worship & Performing Arts department. The college puts on a variety of community concerts, lectures, art shows, and live theatre productions at the building.

== Gallery ==
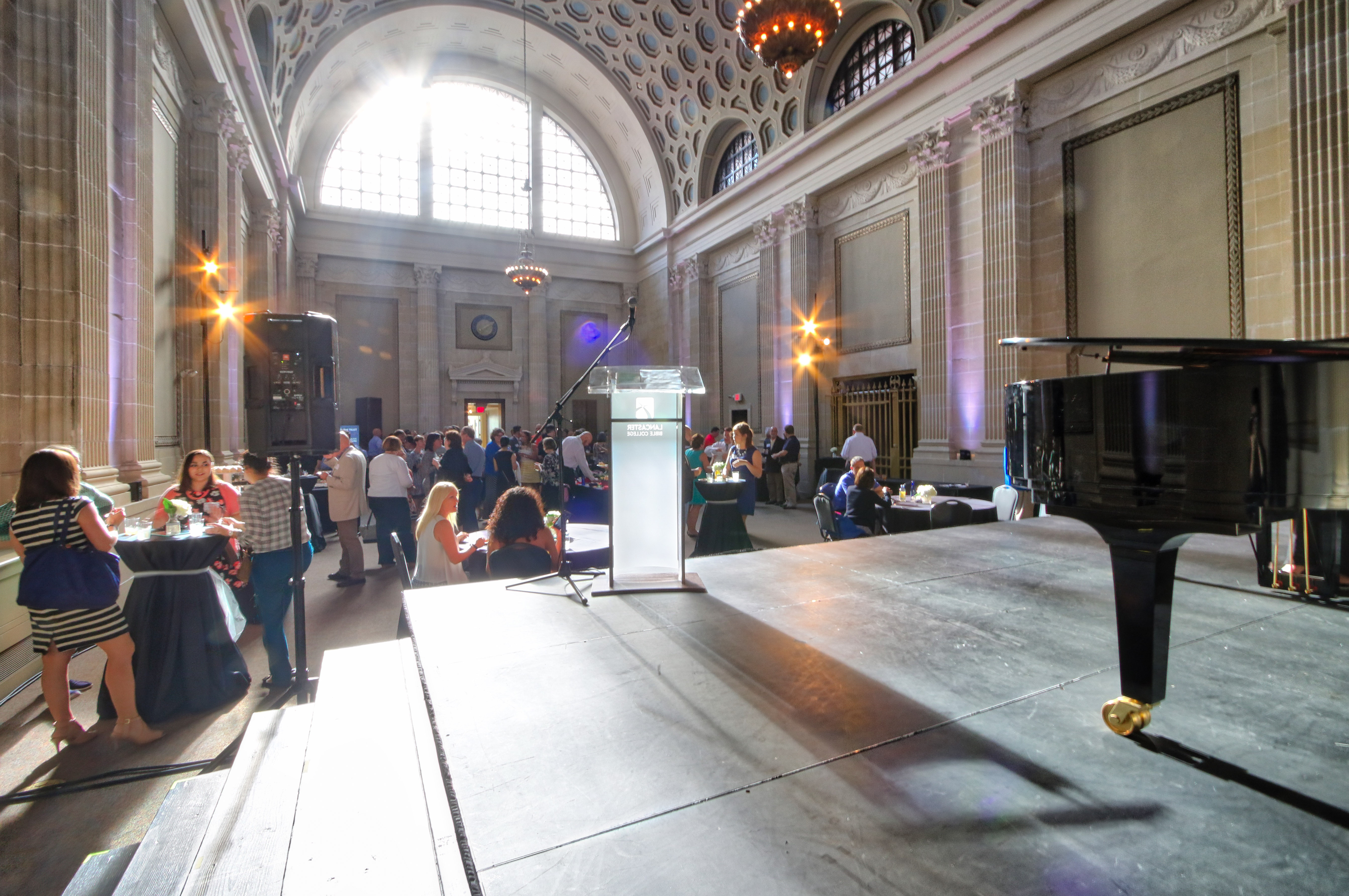
Stage view
