= Reilly Brothers and Raub Building =

- U.S. National Register of Historic Places
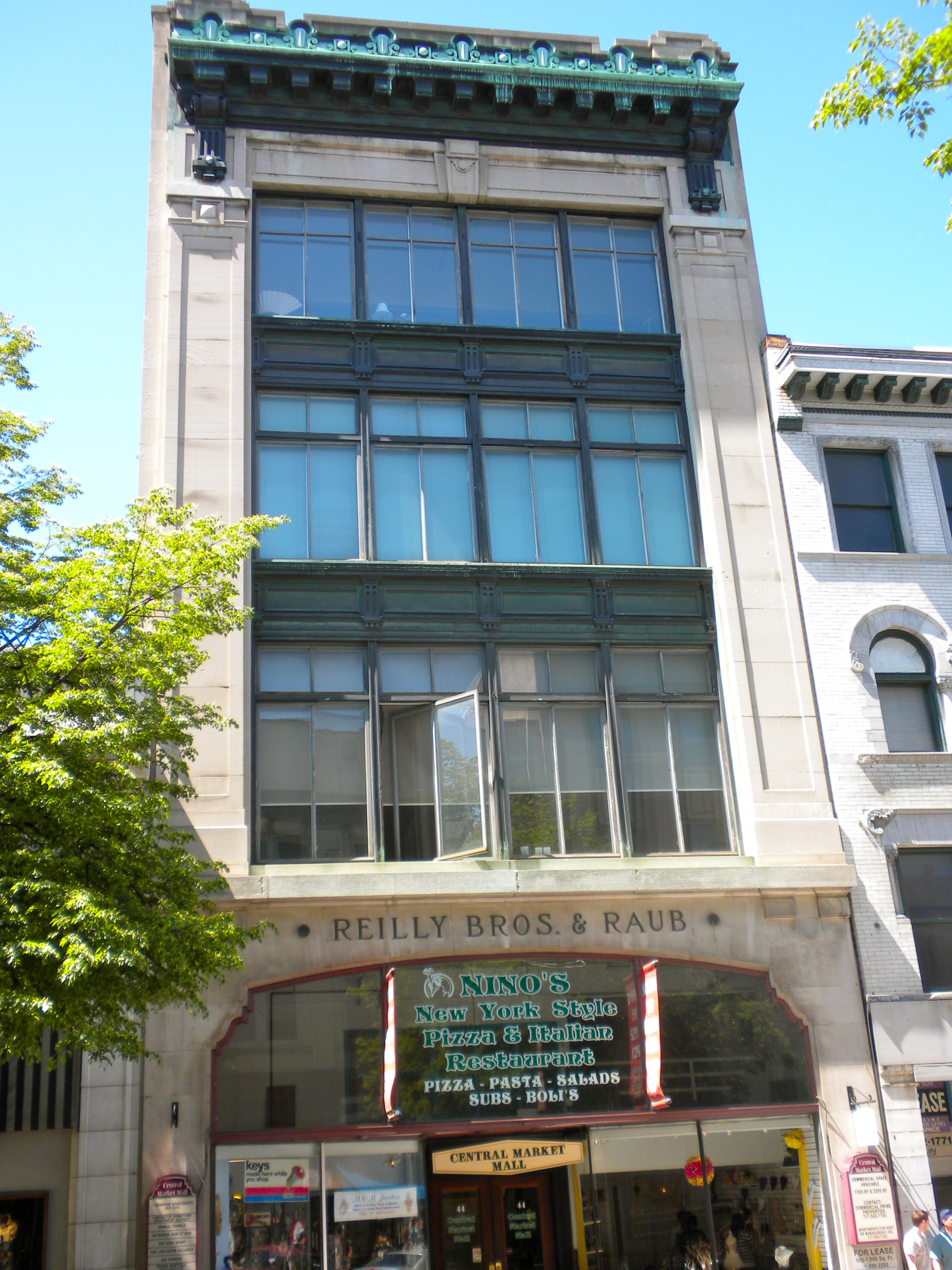
- Reilly Brothers and Raub Building, April 2010

- Location within Pennsylvania Location within the United States
- Location: 44–46 N. Queen St. and 45 N. Market St., Lancaster, Pennsylvania, 17603-3817 (apartments), 17603-3852 (STE 1002 & 1005) 17603-3818 (suites 1003, 1004, and 1006), and 17603-3814 (remainder of building, including STE 1007)
- Coordinates: 40°2′20″N 76°18′21″W
- Area: 0.3 acres (0.12 ha)
- Built: 1910–1911
- Built by: Wohlsen, Herman
- Architect: Urban, Emlen C.
- Architectural style: Beaux Arts
- NRHP reference No.: 83004222
- Added to NRHP: November 3, 1983

The Reilly Brothers and Raub Building is an historic commercial building that is located in Lancaster, Lancaster County, Pennsylvania, United States.

It was added to the National Register of Historic Places in 1983.

== History and architectural features ==
Designed by noted Lancaster architect C. Emlen Urban and built between 1910 and 1911, this historic building is a four- to five-story, L-shaped, steel-frame structure that is clad in brick, pink granite, Indiana limestone, and copper. Created in the Beaux-Arts style, it once housed the Reilly Brothers and Raub hardware store, and now contains a mall and apartment complex, called the Central Market Mall. It is located near the Lancaster Central Market, which stands at 23 North Market St.
