= Stevens School =

Stevens School may refer to:

in the United States (by state)

- Stevens High School (New Hampshire), in Claremont, New Hampshire
- Stevens High School (Lancaster, Pennsylvania), listed on the NRHP
- Thaddeus Stevens School of Observation, Philadelphia, Pennsylvania, listed on the NRHP
- Stevens Elementary School (Pittsburgh), in Pittsburgh, Pennsylvania
- Stevens School (York, Pennsylvania), listed on the NRHP in Pennsylvania
- Stevens High School (South Dakota), in Rapid City, South Dakota
- John Paul Stevens High School, San Antonio, Texas
- Thaddeus Stevens School (Washington, D.C.), listed on the NRHP in Washington, D.C.
- Stevens Point State Normal School, Stevens Point, Wisconsin, listed NRHP
- Stevens School (Seattle), Seattle, Washington

== See also ==
- Stevens Institute of Technology
- Stevens High School (disambiguation)
