= Stephens State Park =

State park in Morris County, New Jersey

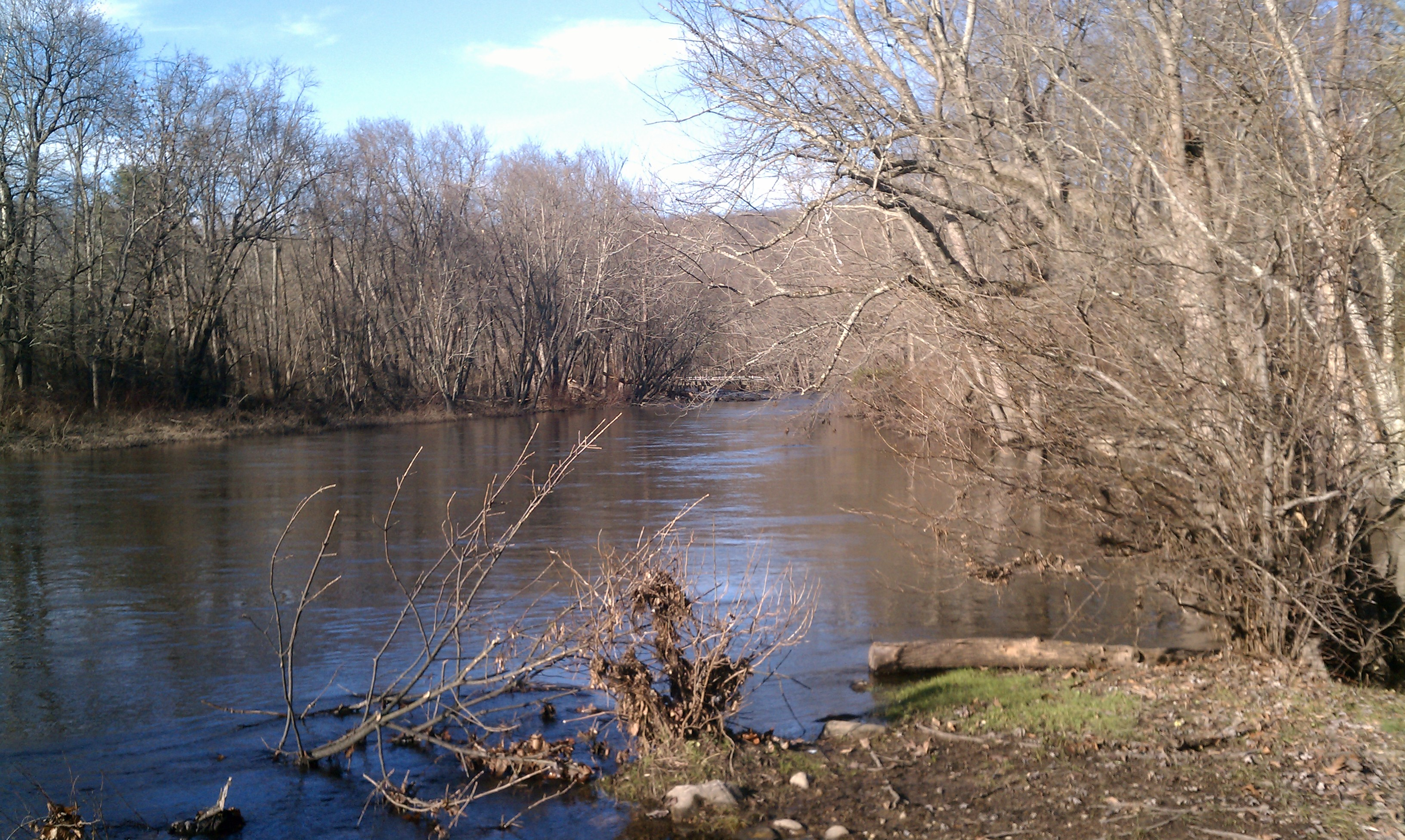
- Looking north up the Musconetcong River at Stephens State Park

- Location within New Jersey Location within the United States
- Location: Morris County
- Coordinates: 40°52′09″N 74°48′36″W
- Area: 163-acre (0.66 km^{2})
- Opened: 1937
- Operator: New Jersey Division of Parks and Forestry
- Website: Official website

Stephens State Park is a state park in the U.S. state of New Jersey. It is 805 acres (3.26 km^{2}) in area, located in western Morris County, north of Hackettstown along the upper Musconetcong River. The park is operated and maintained by the New Jersey Division of Parks and Forestry.

The park includes the remnants of one of the 23 locks, as well as a section of the towpath, of the Morris Canal, built in 1831 to transport anthracite coal from Pennsylvania to New York City.

A 2 miles (3.2 km) section of the Highland Trail runs through the park. The park is a popular destination for recreational trout fishing. The park offers camping facilities during the summer months.

== See also ==
- List of New Jersey state parks
