= Stevens' Building =

- U.S. National Register of Historic Places
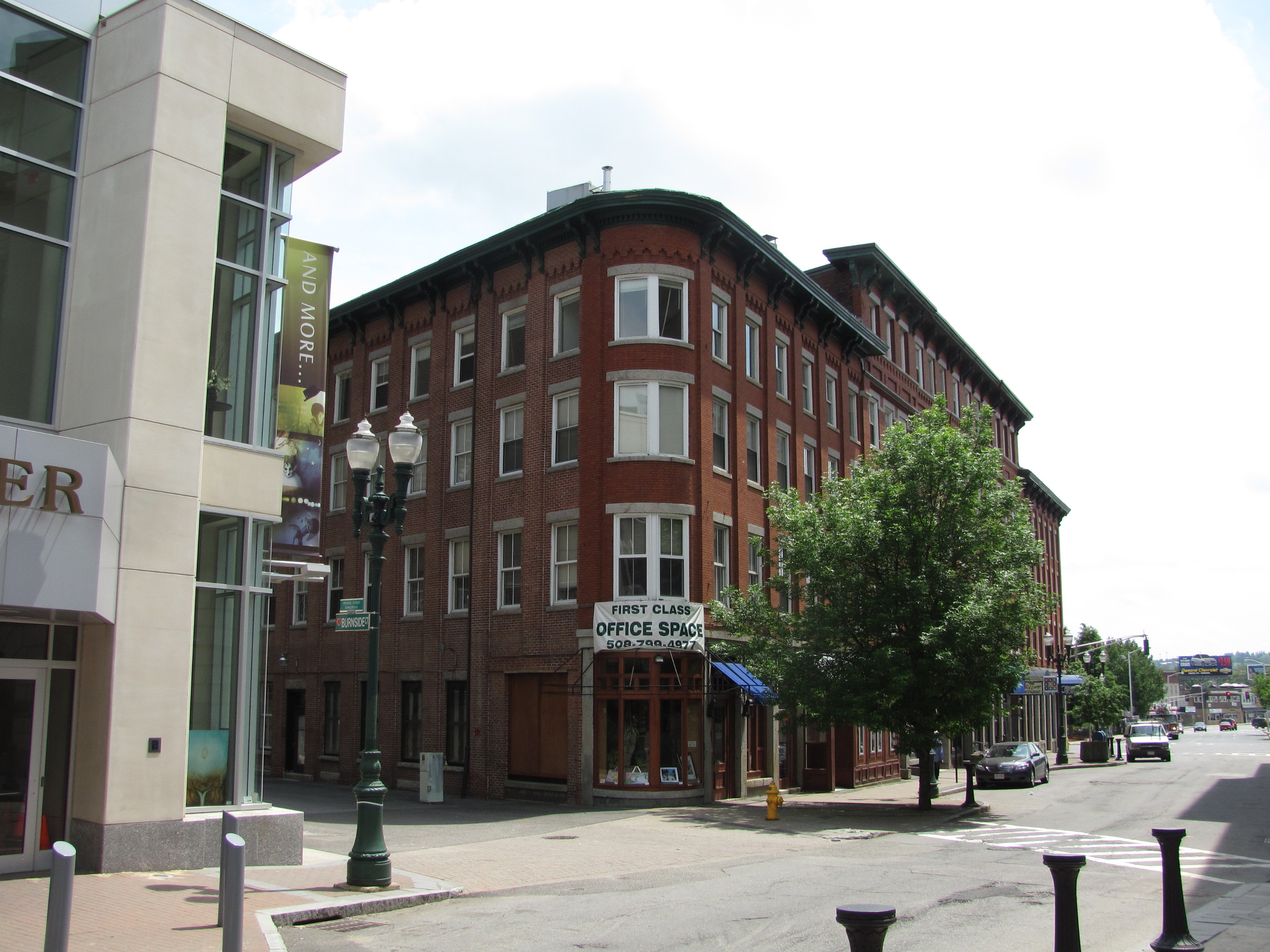
- Stevens' Building

- Location within Massachusetts Location within the United States
- Location: 24–44 Southbridge St., Worcester, Massachusetts
- Coordinates: 42°15′37″N 71°48′13″W
- Built: 1851
- Architectural style: Italianate
- MPS: Worcester MRA
- NRHP reference No.: 80000615
- Added to NRHP: March 5, 1980

Stevens' Building is a historic commercial building located at 24–44 Southbridge Street in downtown Worcester, Massachusetts. It is one of the city's most imposing mid-19th century buildings. The brick building is four stories for most of its length on Southbridge Street, and also presents a finished facade to Burnside Court. The central portion rises to a full five stories with a flat roof, while the north and south sections are four floors with a low pitch roof. The oldest portion of the building was the central portion, built sometime in the 1850s. The Stevens Brothers, manufacturers of wooden architectural building parts, purchased this building c. 1867, extended it northward to Burnside Court, and used it as factory space. By 1870 they had bought the land south of the building, and erected as a freestanding building seven bays of the present building. The two buildings were then joined together later in the 1870s. The fifth floor of the central section was probably added after a fire in the early 1900s.

The building was listed on the National Register of Historic Places in 1980.

== See also ==
- Hanover Theatre for the Performing Arts, across Burnside Court
- Harold D. Donohue Federal Building and United States Courthouse, across Southbridge Street
- Daniel Stevens House, residence of one of the Stevens brothers
- National Register of Historic Places listings in northwestern Worcester, Massachusetts
- National Register of Historic Places listings in Worcester County, Massachusetts
