= Conkey-Stevens House =

Historic house in Massachusetts, United States

- U.S. National Register of Historic Places
- U.S. Historic district – Contributing property
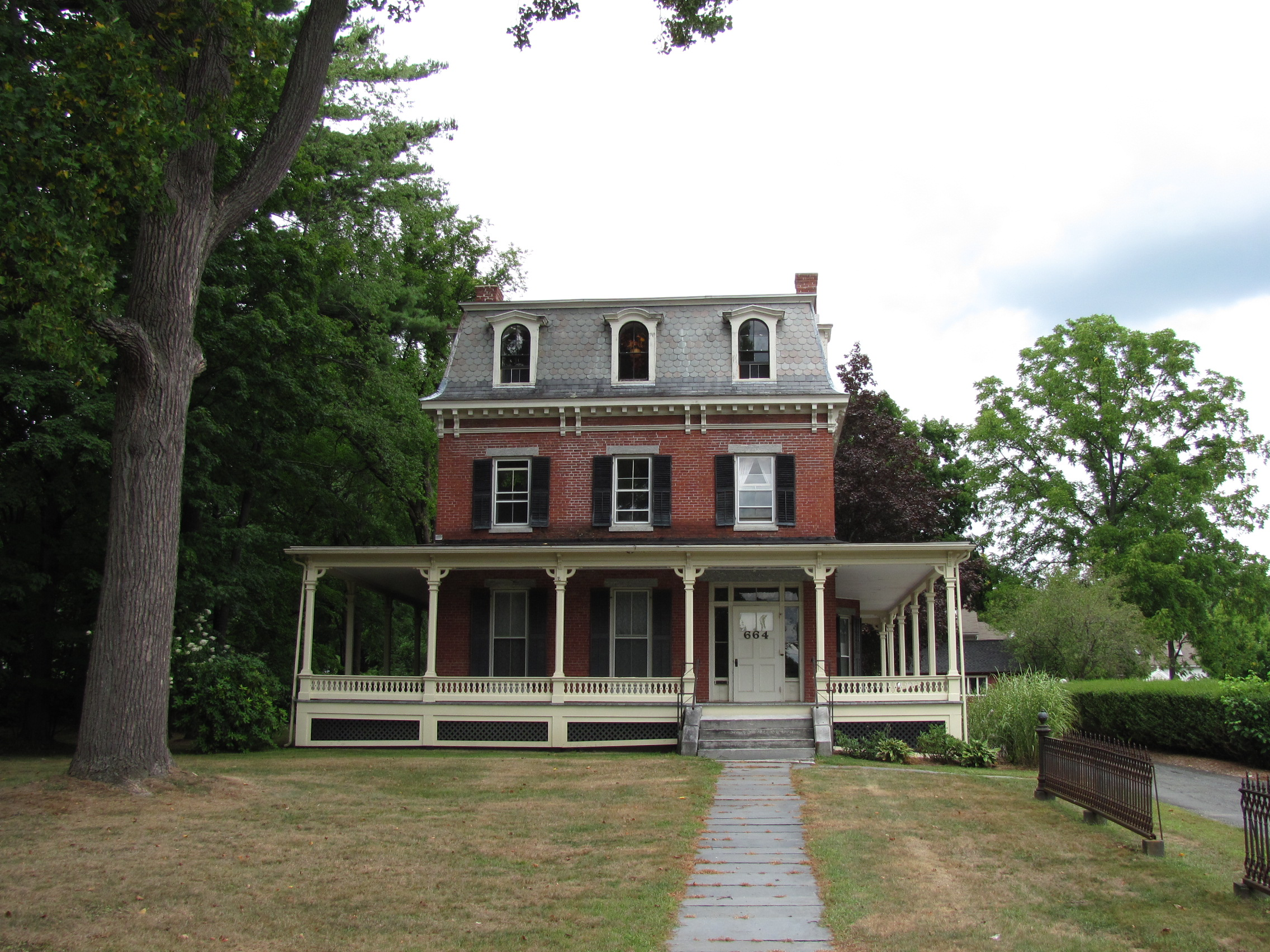
- Conkey-Stevens House

- Location within Massachusetts Location within the United States
- Location: 664 Main St., Amherst, Massachusetts
- Coordinates: 42°22′33″N 72°30′20″W
- Area: 2 acres (0.81 ha)
- Built: 1840
- Architect: Cutler, Robert
- Architectural style: Greek Revival; Second Empire
- Part of: East Village Historic District (ID86001408)
- NRHP reference No.: 79000352

Significant dates
- Added to NRHP: May 10, 1979
- Designated CP: July 6, 1986

The Conkey-Stevens House is a historic brick house located at 664 Main Street in Amherst, Massachusetts. Built in 1840 and remodeled in 1870, it exhibits a well-preserved combination of Greek Revival and Second Empire features. It was listed on the National Register of Historic Places in 1979, and was included as a contributing property to the East Village Historic District in 1986.

== Description and history ==
The Conkey-Stevens House is located on the west side of Amherst's East Village, on the north side of Main Street opposite its junction with Shumway Street. It is a 2 1/2-story brick building, with a mansard roof providing a full third story in the attic level. It has a three-bay front facade, with a single-story porch wrapping across the front and around the right side. The main roof cornice has modillion blocks, with paired brackets set between the window bays. The steep slope of the mansard roof is pierced by three dormers, the outer ones with triangular pediments and the middle one with a segmented-arch pediment. The ground-floor front windows are full length in the Greek Revival style, with the main entrance in the right bay.

This distinctive brick house was built in 1840 with Greek Revival features, but was remodeled in 1870 with a Second Empire style mansard roof. Ithmar Conkey, for whom it was built, was a prominent local lawyer and businessman, who was also active in regional civic affairs. In 1868, it was acquired by Abiel Stevens, whose wife was the sister-in-law of Sidney Dillon, an executive of the Union Pacific Railroad. Their son Albert worked for the railroad, and used his earnings to refashion the house in the Second Empire style. The house remained in the Stevens family until 1977.

== See also ==
- National Register of Historic Places listings in Hampshire County, Massachusetts
