= Daniel Stevens House =

Historic house in Massachusetts, United States

- U.S. National Register of Historic Places
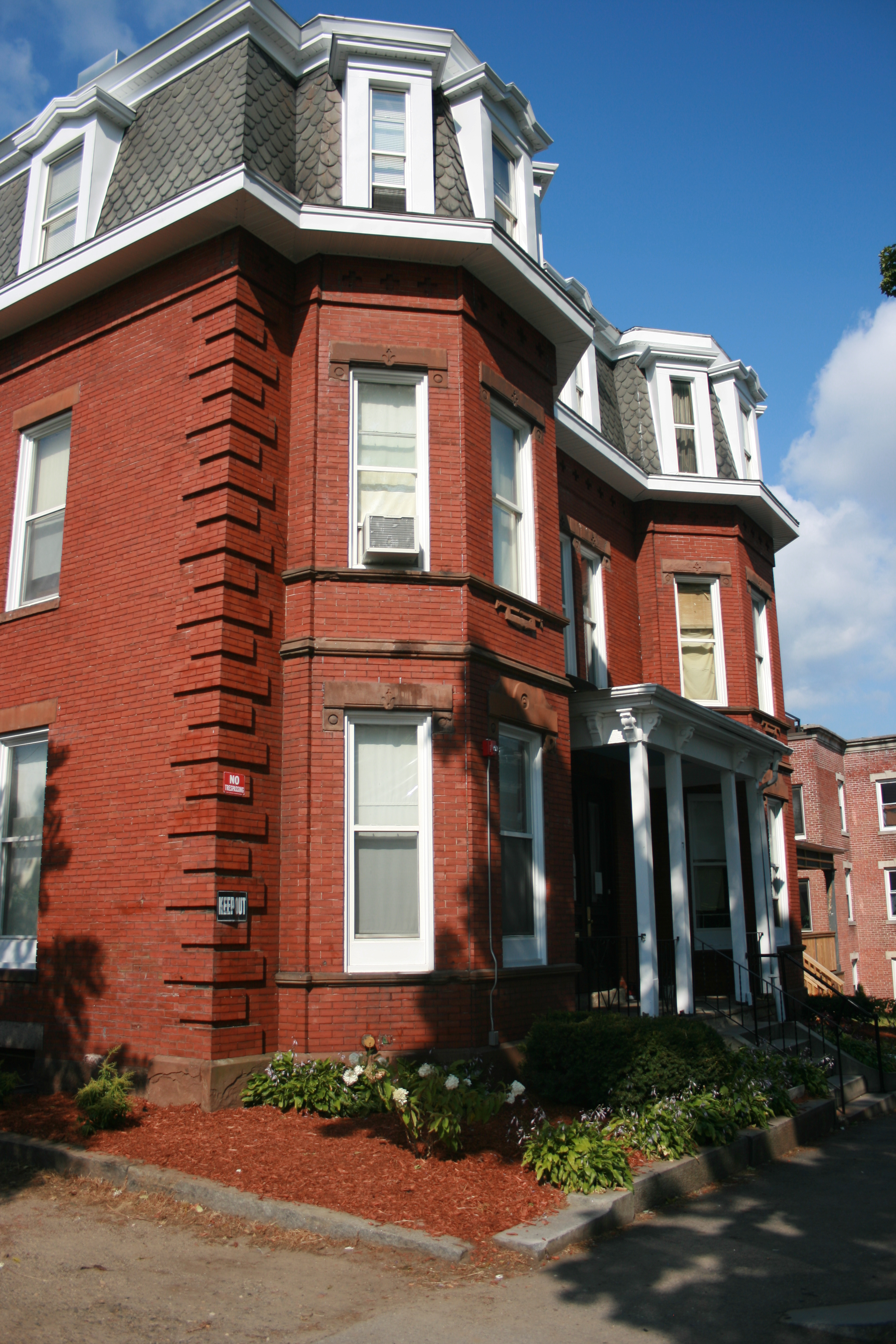

- Location within Massachusetts Location within the United States
- Location: 7 Sycamore St., Worcester, Massachusetts
- Coordinates: 42°15′28″N 71°48′25″W
- Area: less than one acre
- Built: c. 1865
- Architectural style: Second Empire
- MPS: Worcester MRA
- NRHP reference No.: 80000532
- Added to NRHP: March 05, 1980

The Daniel Stevens House is a historic Second Empire house at 7 Sycamore Street in Worcester, Massachusetts. Built about 1865 for Daniel and Charles Stevens, it is a well-preserved local example of Second Empire architecture. It was listed on the National Register of Historic Places in 1980.

== Description and history ==
The Daniel Stevens House stands on the southwest side of Sycamore Street, a residential side street a short way south of downtown Worcester. It is a 2 1/2-story brick building, with a mansard roof providing a full third floor. It is three bays wide, with the outer bays consisting of projecting polygonal sections. The entrance is in the center bay, sheltered by a flat-roof porch with square posts and a bracketed cornice. The building corners are quoined in brick, and the windows are set in openings with shouldered brownstone lintels, and with brownstone sills connected to thin projecting brownstone stringcourses. The steep mansard slopes are pierced by elaborate dormers with bracketed gabled roofs.

Daniel Stevens was a native of Charlton who settled in Worcester in 1853 with his brother Charles and established business as painters. Their business was so successful that they built a large facility on Southbridge Street now known as the Stevens' Building, and expanded into the manufacture of wooden architectural parts. The lived in a previous house at 7 Sycamore prior to the construction of this house, which was probably sometime between 1865 and 1870 (based on stylistic evidence and period maps). Charles Stevens moved out in 1880.

== See also ==
- National Register of Historic Places listings in southwestern Worcester, Massachusetts
- National Register of Historic Places listings in Worcester County, Massachusetts
