= Northeast Lancaster Township Historic District =

Historic district in Pennsylvania, United States

- U.S. National Register of Historic Places
- U.S. Historic district
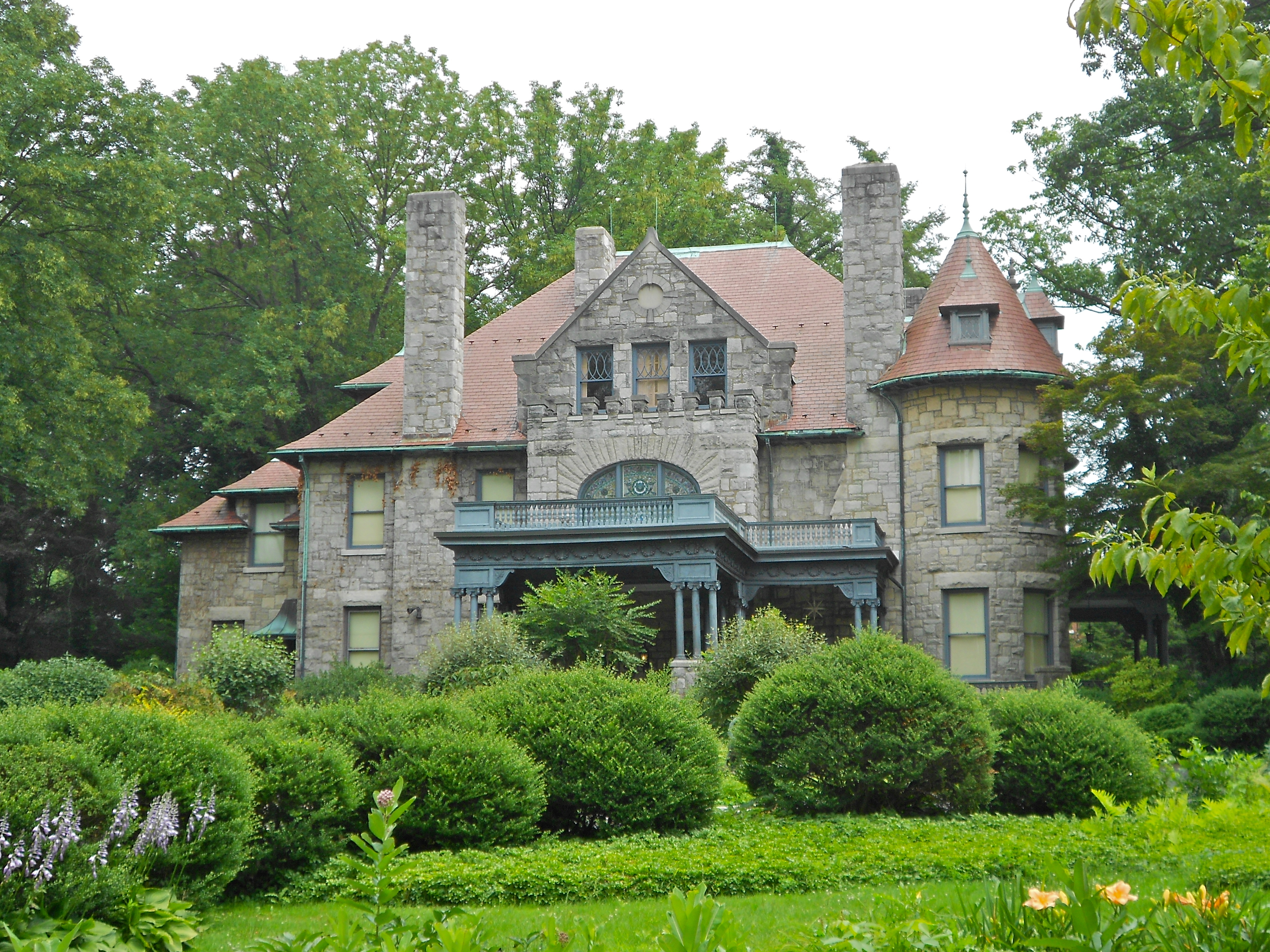
- 1035 Marietta Avenue

- Location within Pennsylvania Location within the United States
- Interactive map showing the location for Northeast Lancaster Township Historic District
- Location: Roughly bounded by Marietta, Race, and Wheatland Avenues and Wilson Drive, Lancaster Township, Pennsylvania
- Coordinates: 40°02′32″N 76°19′56″W
- Area: 146.9 acres (59.4 ha)
- Built: c. 1820, 1920-1939
- Architect: Multiple
- Architectural style: Colonial Revival, Tudor Revival, Other, American Four-square
- NRHP reference No.: 86000464
- Added to NRHP: March 20, 1986

The Northeast Lancaster Township Historic District is a national historic district that is located in Lancaster Township, Lancaster County, Pennsylvania.

It was listed on the National Register of Historic Places in 1986.

== History and architectural features ==
This district includes 183 contributing buildings and is almost exclusively residential. The oldest buildings date to circa 1820 and include Wheatland and the Herr House. The majority of the residences were built between 1920 and 1939, and include notable examples of the Colonial Revival, Tudor Revival, and American Foursquare architectural styles.
