= Stevens High School =

Stevens High School may refer to:

in the United States (by state)

- Stevens High School (New Hampshire), in Claremont, New Hampshire
- Stevens High School (Lancaster, Pennsylvania), listed on the National Register of Historic Places in Pennsylvania
- Stevens High School (South Dakota), in Rapid City, South Dakota
- John Paul Stevens High School, San Antonio, Texas

== See also ==
- Stevens School (disambiguation)
