= William Stevens House (Kenton, Delaware) =

Historic house in Delaware, United States

- U.S. National Register of Historic Places
- Location within Delaware Location within the United States
- Location: Delaware Route 6, Kenton, Delaware
- Coordinates: 39°16′33″N 75°40′30″W
- Area: 2.9 acres (1.2 ha)
- Built: c. 1811, c. 1860
- Architectural style: Italianate
- MPS: Kenton Hundred MRA
- NRHP reference No.: 83001406
- Added to NRHP: August 29, 1983

William Stevens House, also known as Peach Mansion, is a historic home located at Kenton, Kent County, Delaware. The house was erected about 1860, and is a three-story, five-bay, single pile frame dwelling in the Italianate style. It has a low hipped roof and a projecting box cornice with decorative brackets. The original house, built about 1811, forms the gable-roofed, three-bay, two-story, rear wing. Also on the property is a contributing 19th century springhouse.

It was listed on the National Register of Historic Places in 1983. It was demolished in a controlled burn in February 2001.
