= William Stevens House (Clinton, Connecticut) =

Historic house in Connecticut, United States

- U.S. National Register of Historic Places
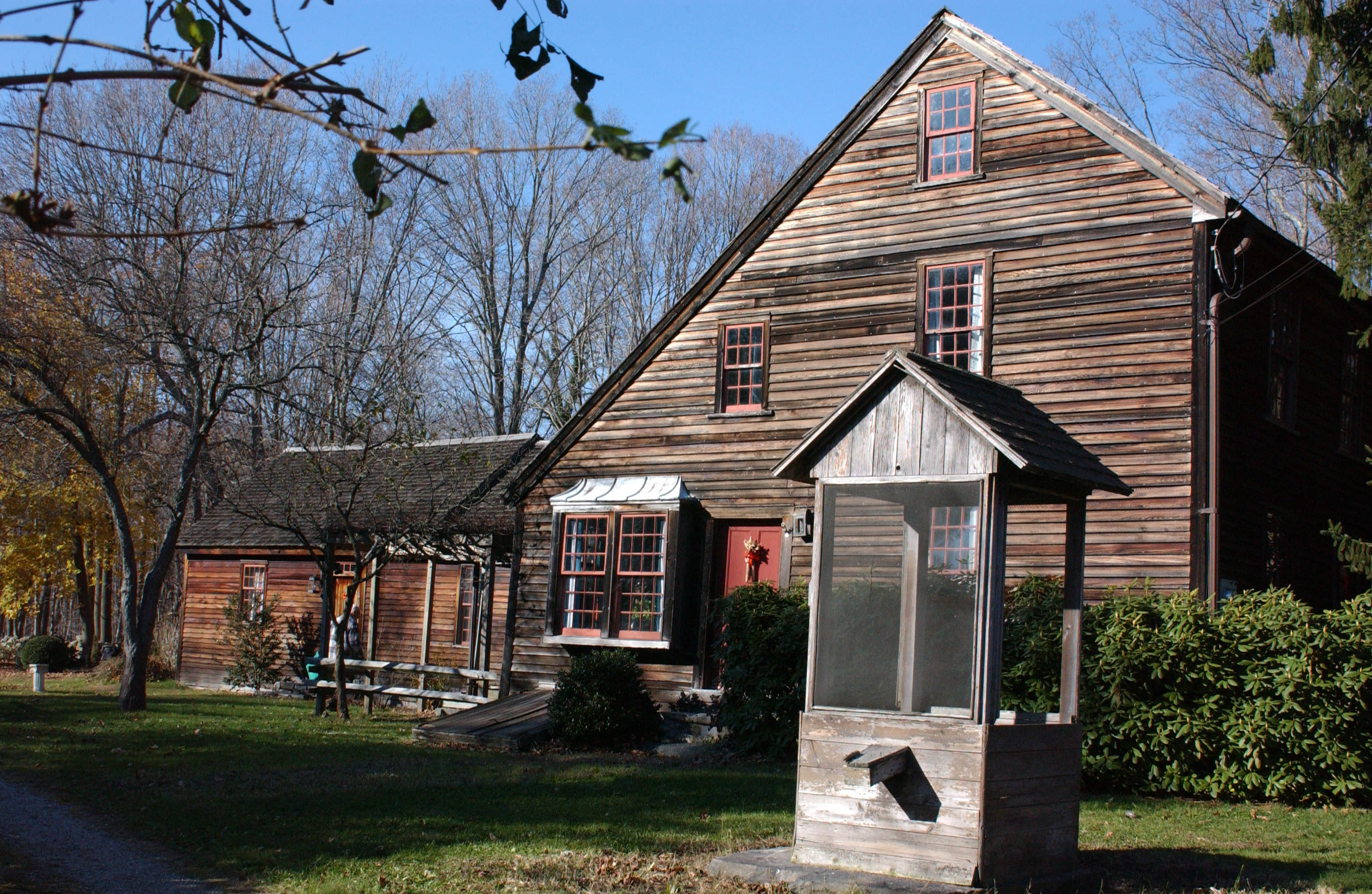

- Location within Connecticut Location within the United States
- Location: 131 Cow Hill Road, Clinton, Connecticut
- Coordinates: 41°18′17″N 72°32′45″W
- Area: 2.2 acres (0.89 ha)
- Architect: Stevens, William
- Architectural style: Saltbox
- NRHP reference No.: 85001163
- Added to NRHP: May 30, 1985

The William Stevens House is a historic house at 131 Cow Hill Road in Clinton, Connecticut. Built near the start of the 18th century, it is one of Clinton's oldest surviving buildings, which is especially noted for its unusual floorplan. The house was listed on the National Register of Historic Places in 1985.

== Description and history ==
The William Stevens House is located in a rural-suburban setting in northern Clinton, on the west side of Cow Hill Road just north of its junction with Airline Road. It is set facing south, separated from the street by a low stone wall. It is a 2 1/2-story wood-frame structure, 3 bays wide, with a side-gable roof and a large central chimney. The rear of the house has a leanto section, giving it a saltbox appearance, from which a modern single-story addition extends further. The house is distinctive in part because of an extremely non-standard floorplan. Instead of a tight winding stair in the front vestibule, the chimney in the house is set further back than normal in houses of the period, and the stair rises via a dogleg and straight run to the chimney's left. Conventional houses of the period of fireplaces on the sides of the chimney in the two front chambers, while in this house, because of the chimney location, they are on the front.

The house's construction date is uncertain: it is usually attributed to William Stevens (1630-1703), placing it in the late 17th or early 18th century. Stevens was the England-born son of John Stevens, one of the early settlers of the New Haven Colony. Nine generations of descendants of Stevens owned the house, their period of ownership ending in the 1970s. Architectural historians theorize that the house began as a small (one-room) residence on Stevens-owned farmland, and was gradually enlarged, explaining its unusual plan.

== See also ==
- National Register of Historic Places listings in Middlesex County, Connecticut
