= Stevens High School (Lancaster, Pennsylvania) =

- U.S. National Register of Historic Places
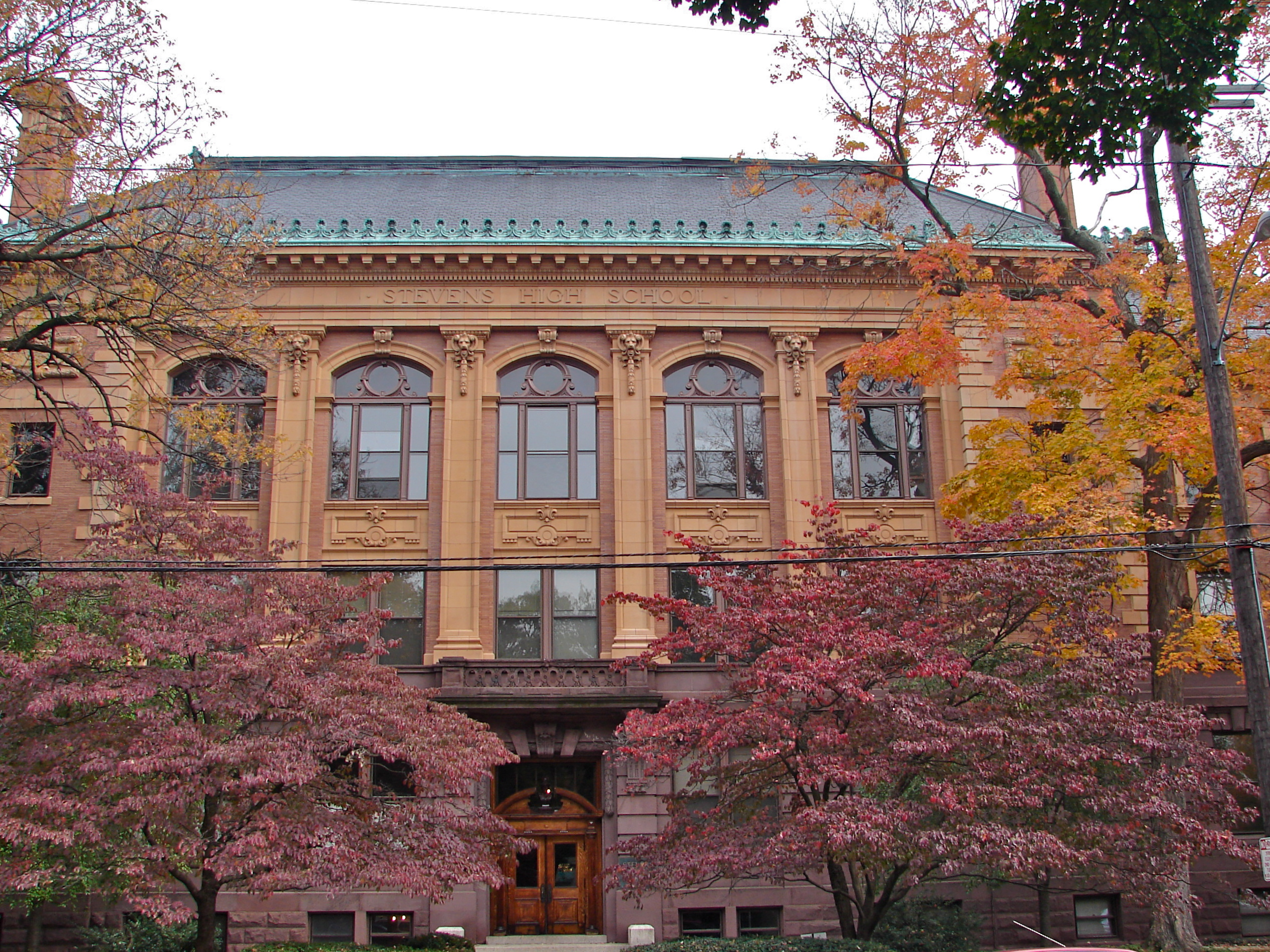
- Stevens High School, October 2010

- Location within Pennsylvania Location within the United States
- Location: 355 W. Chestnut St., Lancaster, Pennsylvania
- Coordinates: 40°2′26″N 76°18′47″W
- Area: less than one acre
- Built: 1904–1905
- Architect: George Gessell, C. Emlen Urban
- Architectural style: Late 19th And 20th Century Revivals, 2nd Renaissance Revival
- NRHP reference No.: 83002257
- Added to NRHP: June 30, 1983

Stevens High School, also known as Girls High School and Stevens Elementary School, is an historic, former American high school building located in Lancaster, Lancaster County, Pennsylvania.

It was added to the National Register of Historic Places in 1983.

== History and architectural features ==
Designed by noted Lancaster architect C. Emlen Urban and built between 1904 and 1905, this historic structure is a three-story, rectangular brick and brownstone building that was created in the Second Renaissance Revival style. It has a slate covered mansard roof and terra cotta ornamentation.

The building measures 176 feet wide and 74 feet deep. It operated as a high school until 1938, when it was designated an elementary school. The school is named for Congressman Thaddeus Stevens (1792–1868).
