= Soldiers and Sailors Monument (Lancaster, Pennsylvania) =

- U.S. National Register of Historic Places
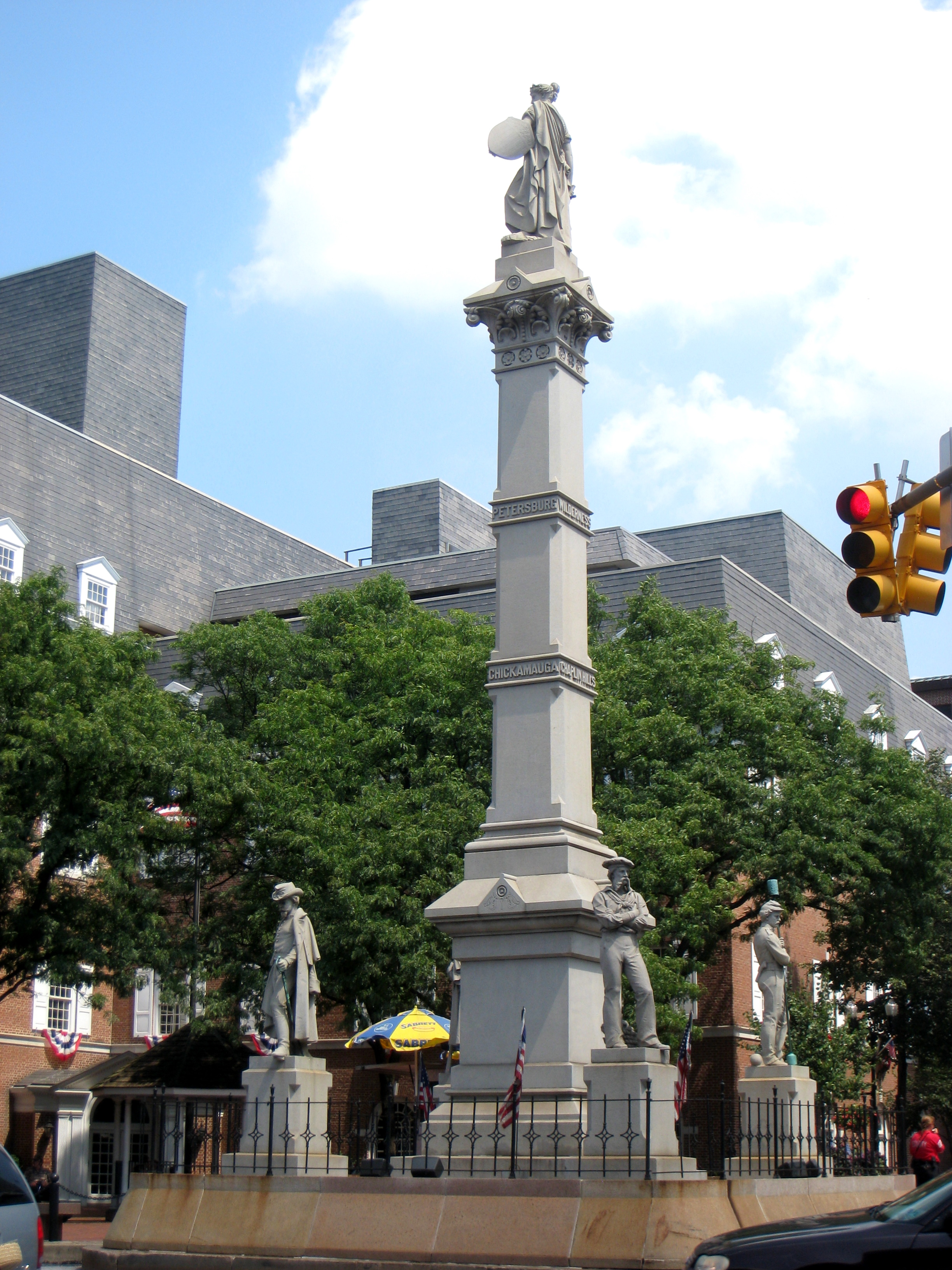
- The Soldiers and Sailors Monument, looking north up Queen St.

- Location within Pennsylvania
- Location: Penn Square; Lancaster, Pennsylvania, United States
- Coordinates: 40°2′16.8″N 76°18′29.5″W
- Built: July 4, 1874
- Architect: Lewis Haldy
- Architectural style: Gothic Revival
- NRHP reference No.: 73001635
- Added to NRHP: April 2, 1973

The Soldiers and Sailors Monument is a 43-foot (13 m) tall Gothic Revival memorial which stands in Penn Square in downtown Lancaster, Pennsylvania. It was dedicated on July 4, 1874, at its present site on the Northeast intersection of King and Queen Streets. The monument's original intention was to pay tribute to Lancastrian Union soldiers killed during the American Civil War. However, today the Soldiers and Sailors Monument also represents those who have served in subsequent American military conflicts.

The 1744 Treaty of Lancaster between the British and Iroquois was signed in the old Lancaster courthouse which stood on the site of the monument at the time.

The Soldiers and Sailors Monument also stands on the exact spot where the Second Continental Congress met during the American Revolutionary War on September 27, 1777, in the old Lancaster Courthouse. The courthouse was built in 1739 but later burned down in 1784, rebuilt 1787 to serve as State House from 1799 to 1812 and reverting as Lancaster County Courthouse until 1852.

The monument has been listed on the National Register of Historic Places since April 2, 1973.

== Description ==
The Lancaster Soldiers and Sailors Monument features a 43-foot (13 m) tall Rhode Island, rectangular granite pillar topped with a statue of a robed woman on a pedestal known as the "Genius of Liberty". The Genius of Liberty holds a drawn sword and a shield. Her head is crowned with stars. She faces north which, according to legend, allows her to turn her back on the former Confederate States of America, which were defeated in the war.

Statues of four men representing the four branches of the American armed services surround the granite shaft near its base. The four branches represented by the men are the United States Navy, United States Army, Artillery and the United States Cavalry.

The names of several Civil War battles are carved on the monument's central granite pillar, as the memorial's original intent was to honor those killed in that particular war. The inscriptions include the Battle of Antietam, the Battle of Chickamauga, the Battle of Gettysburg, the Battle of Malvern Hill, the Siege of Petersburg and the Battle of the Wilderness.

Several bronze plaques have been added to the Soldiers and Sailors Monument since its construction, memorializing members of the American armed forces. One plaque specifically commemorates the role of African Americans in the military. Other separate plaques honor those killed in World War I, World War II, the Korean War, Vietnam War and the Persian Gulf War.

The base of the Soldiers and Sailors Monument is carved with the inscription, "Erected by the people of Lancaster County/ To the memory of their fellow citizens who fell /in defense of the Union /in the War of the Rebellion /1861–1865"

== History ==
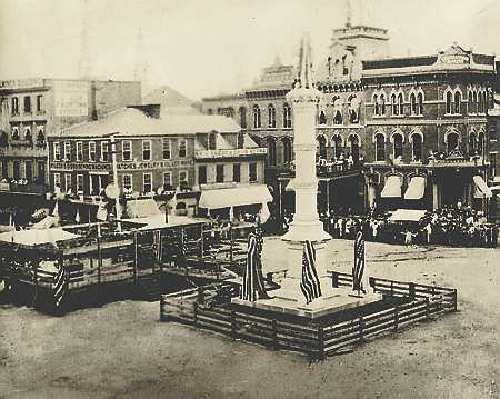
A photo of the Soldiers and Sailors Monument in Penn Square taken on the day of its dedication on July 4, 1874.

The idea for a memorial to Lancastrian Union soldiers killed during the American Civil War was conceived soon after the end of hostilities in 1865. The funding for the memorial was championed by a women's civic organization called the Patriot Daughters of Lancaster and its leader, Rosina Hubley. The Patriot Daughters of Lancaster held a ladies fundraising fair sale in December 1867 at the nearby Fulton Hall, now called the Fulton Opera House, to help finance the construction of the proposed monument. The event raised approximately US$3,500 the ultimate goal of $20,000. The remaining funds for the monument's construction were raised through either military taxes and funds released by the Lancaster County Treasury or through private donations. The total cost of the Soldiers and Sailors Monument is believed to be $26,000 at the time.

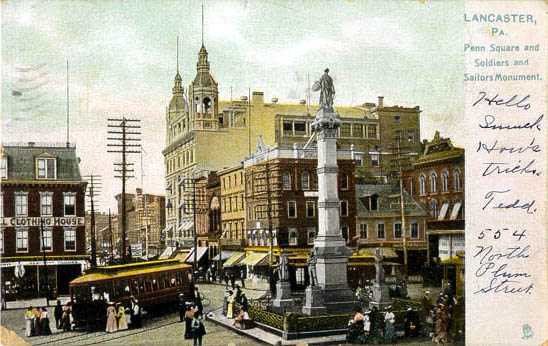
1906 postcard looking northwest

Centre Square, as the present-day Penn Square was called at the time, was chosen as the site of the new Soldiers and Sailors Monument. The monument was formally commissioned on November 4, 1872. It was formally unveiled and dedicated on July 4, 1874, and was originally surrounded by stockade fencing and dirt streets at the time. President Ulysses S. Grant sent his regrets for being unable to attend the ceremony. The large crowd which watched the dedication included Civil War veterans and a group of girls from the Mount Joy Soldiers Orphan Home. The Soldiers and Sailors Monument was officially dedicated at 1:00 pm while the girls from the orphanage sang My Father's Grave. The Genius of Liberty on top of the monument was draped in an American flag.

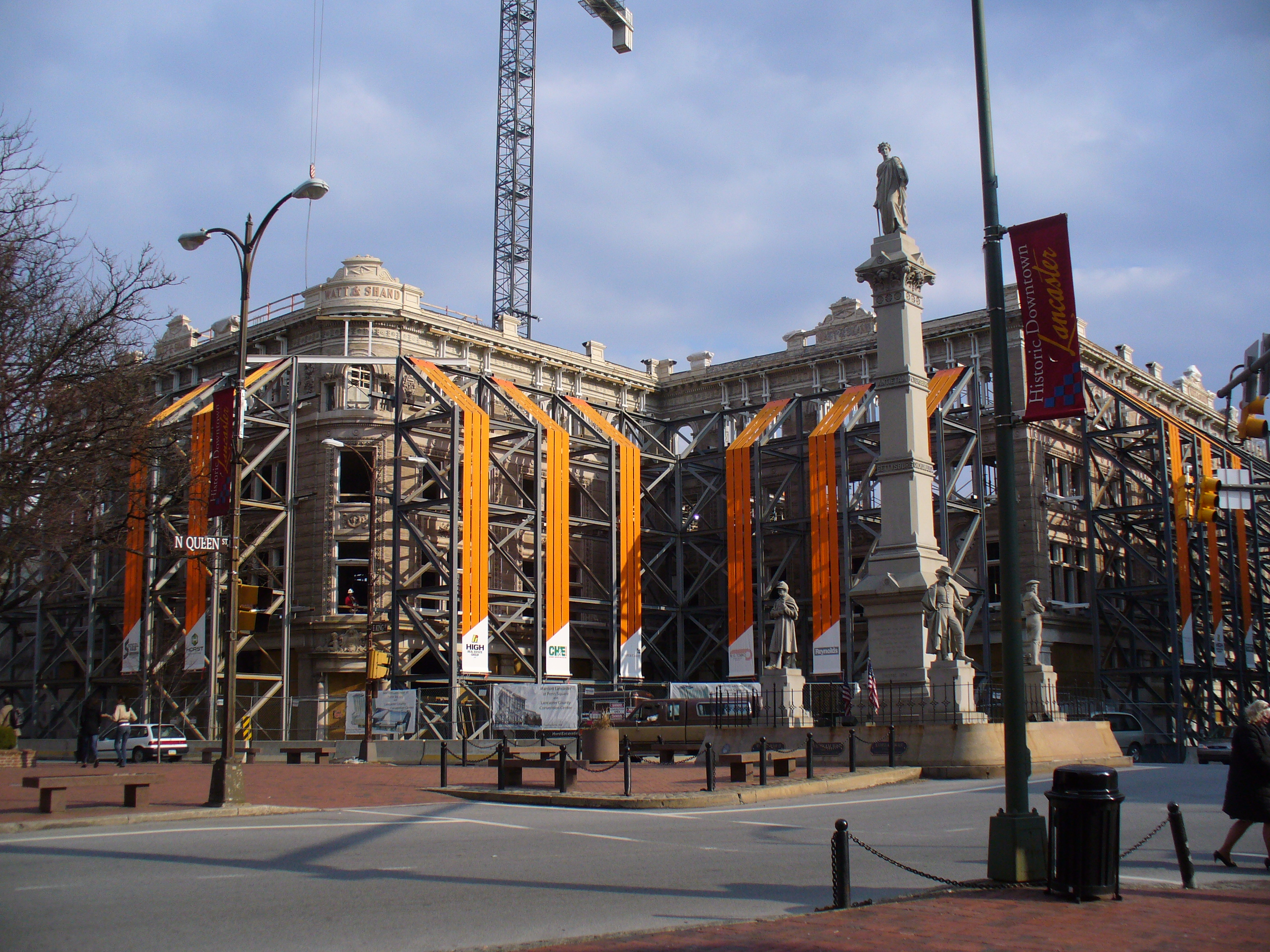
The Soldiers and Sailors Monument in Penn Square in Lancaster, Pennsylvania.

Rosina Hubley, who had led the efforts to construct the Soldiers and Sailors Monument, remarked on July 4, 1874, that she believed it would be a "perpetual reminder to all people of the country as they gather week-to-week to barter and chaffer in the market place, that there is something higher and better than self or produce, bargains or bank notes."

An iron fence and granite wall enclosure were added to the monument in 1877, replacing the original picket fence. The monument was sandblasted and cleaned in both 1905 and 1924. A plaque containing the Gettysburg Address and a picture of Abraham Lincoln were added on June 8, 1931. New lights were placed on the monument in 1956, 1972 and again in the early 2000s.

A proposal was floated during the 1950s to relocate the monument to an alternative site in a city park in order to ease traffic congestion in downtown Lancaster. However, the relocation idea was abandoned and the memorial remained at its original location.

Traffic passed around all four sides of the monument until the 1970s. A new traffic pattern was devised for Penn Square and the monument in 1972. A brick plaza was constructed in tandem with the expansion of the nearby Fulton Bank building, closing off traffic on the monument's northeast corner and opening it to pedestrians. The size of the monument's base was shrunk from its original 35 feet (11 m) down to 17 feet (5.2 m) as part of the reroute of traffic. The iron railing, added in 1877, was removed and new granite curbing was added to protect the monument from traffic collisions.

On November 12, 1978, a woman committed suicide by crashing her car into the monument, causing damage to the sailor statue, which represents the United States Navy. The sailor statue's base and legs were repaired using cement.

The new $170 million, 200,000 square feet (19,000 m^{2}) Lancaster County Convention Center and 300 room Marriott Hotel opened directly across the street from the monument on April 21, 2009. The historic Lancaster Central Market, constructed in 1889, and the W. W. Griest Building stand just to the northwest.

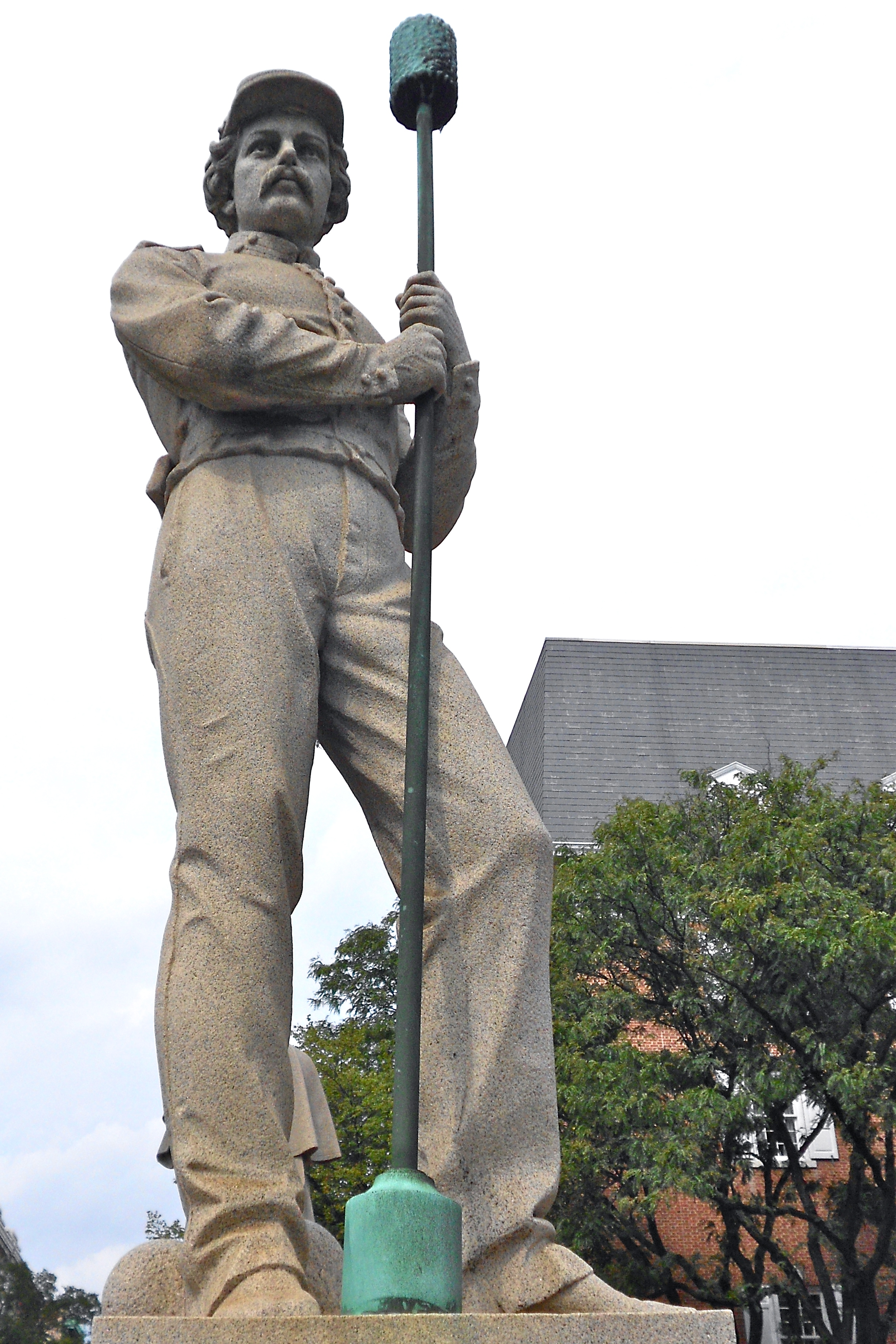
Artillery (NE corner)

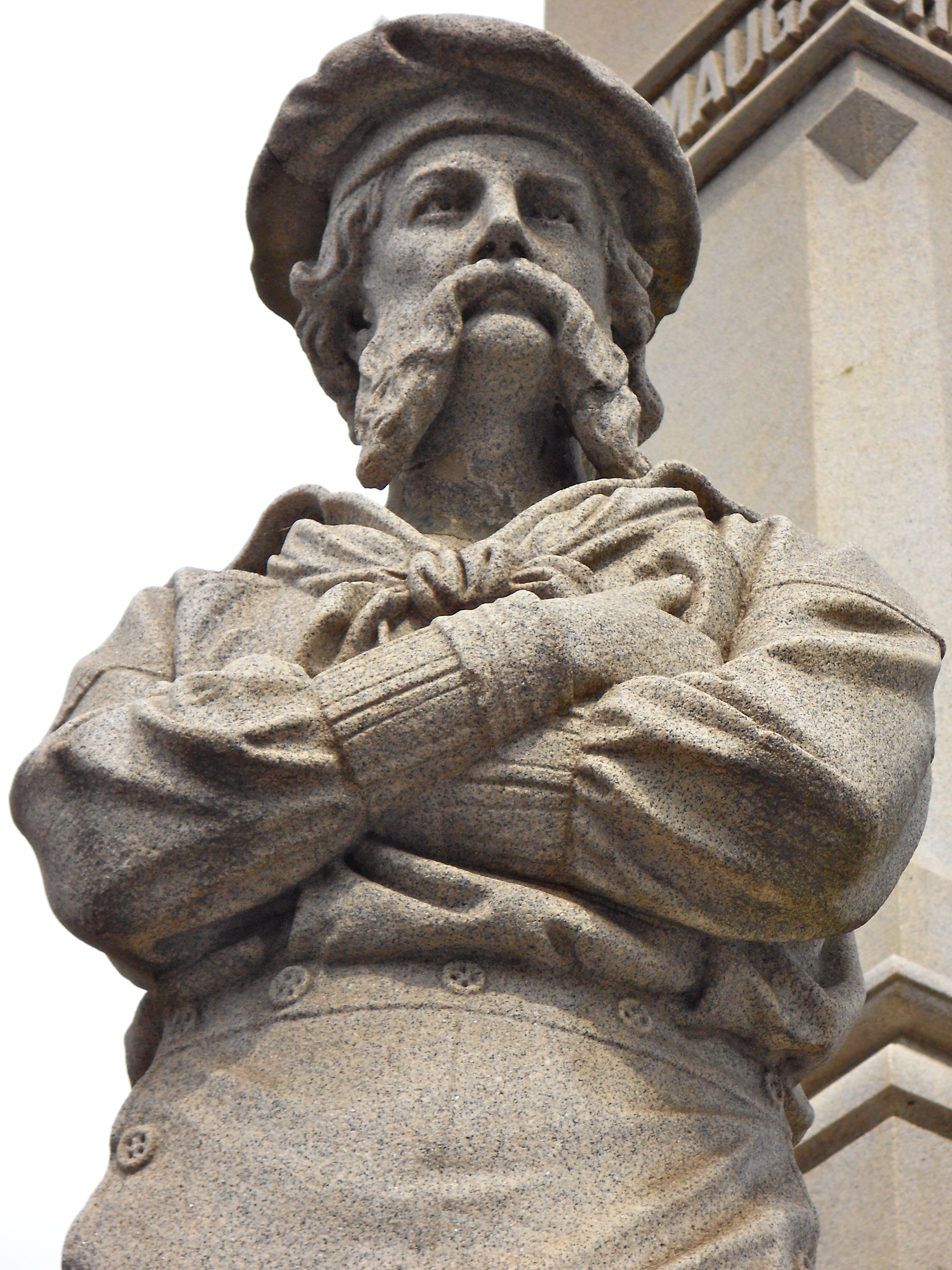
Navy (SE corner)

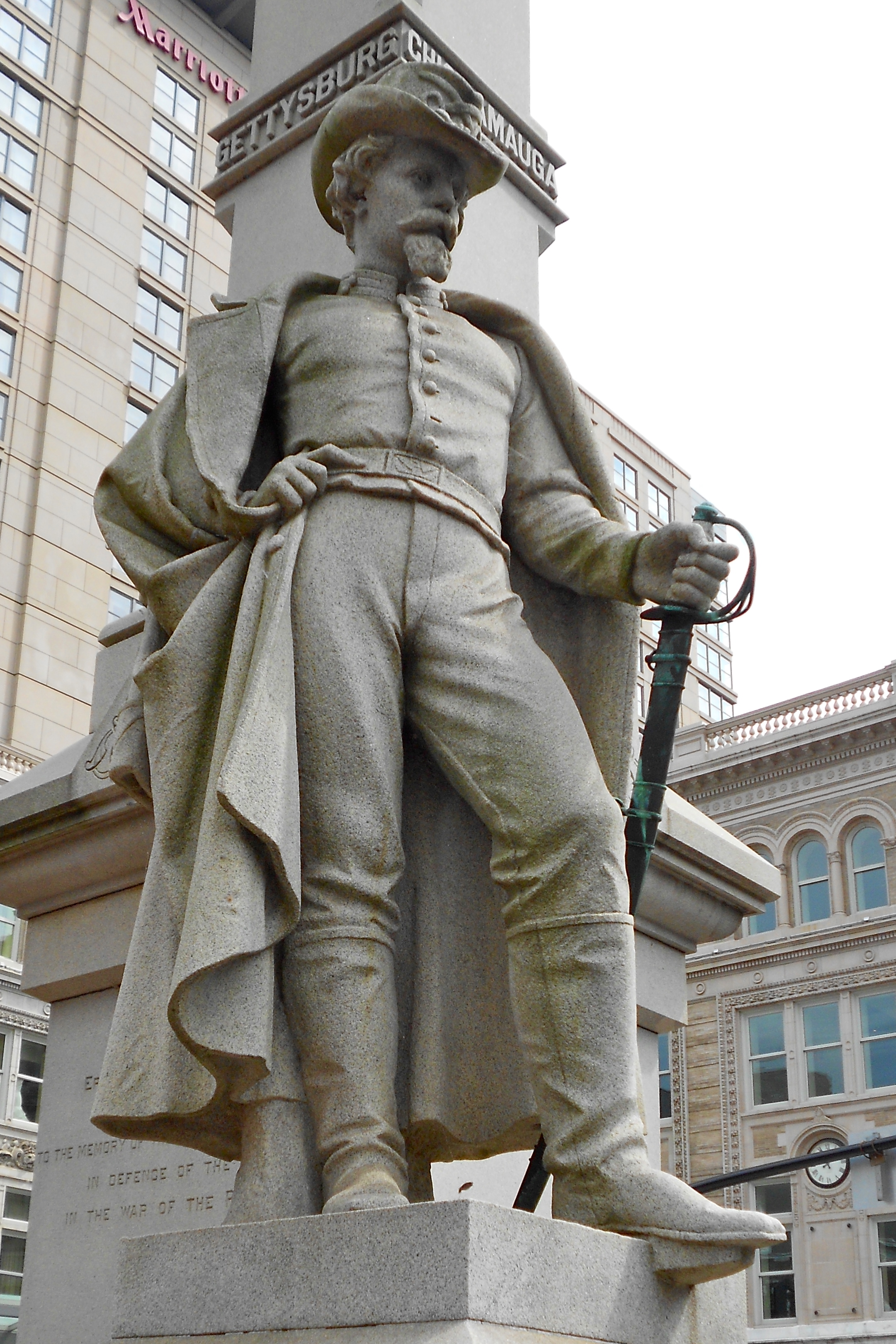
Cavalry (SW corner)

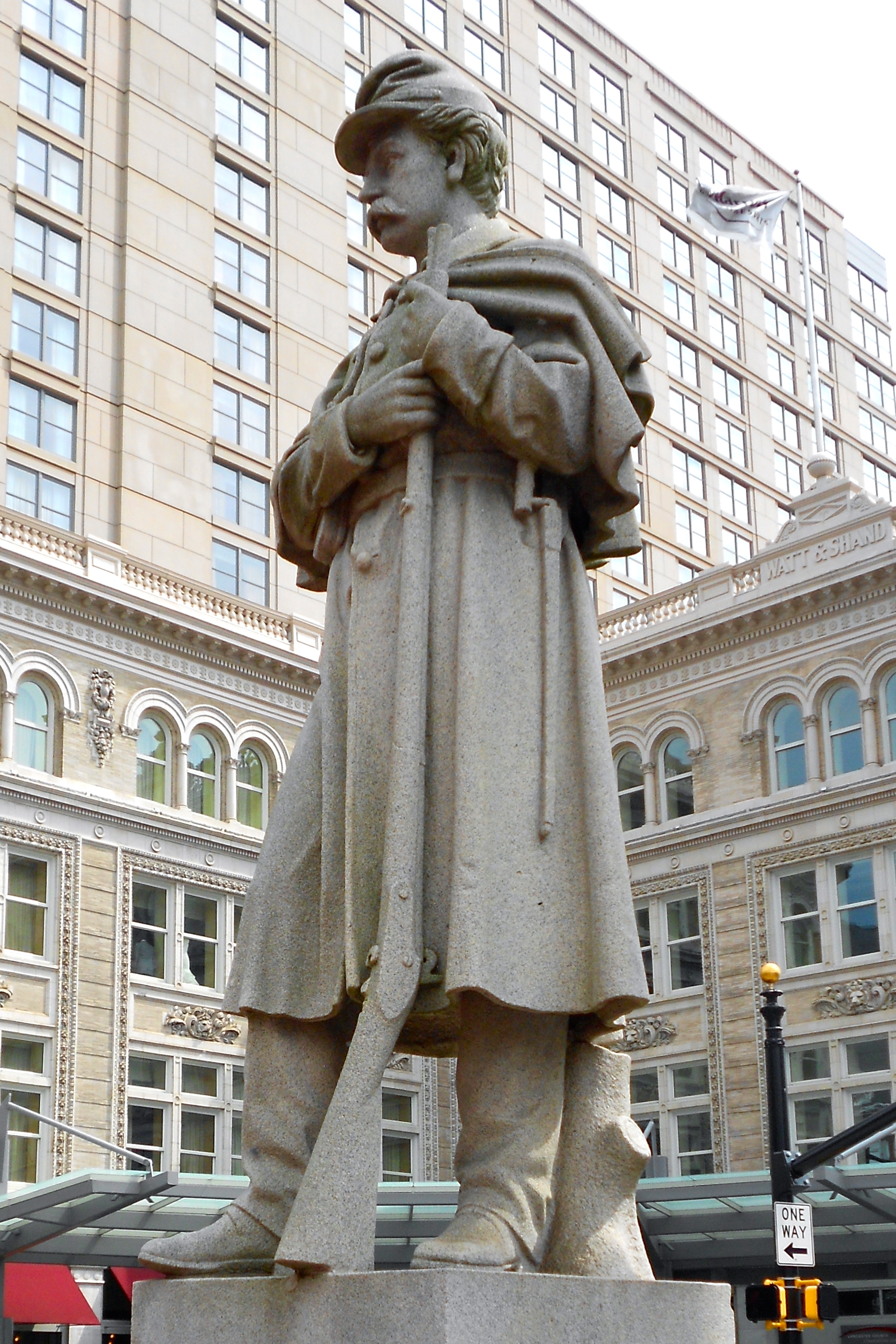
Infantry (NW corner)

== See also ==
- National Register of Historic Places listings in Lancaster, Pennsylvania
