= North Museum of Nature and Science =

Museum in Lancaster, Pennsylvania, U.S.

- Established: 1953
- Location: 400 College Ave, Lancaster
- Coordinates: 40.0436°N 76.3202°W
- Type: Natural history
- Website: northmuseum.org

The North Museum of Nature and Science is a museum in Lancaster, Pennsylvania, specialising in natural history, formerly part of Franklin & Marshall College.

== History ==
The museum was founded in 1953 with help from local businessman Hugh M. North. It became independent from the college in 1992.

In 2014, the museum underwent a renovation before reopening in 2015.

== Exhibits ==
- Birds
- Fossils - Contains several dinosaur fossils and an authentic moa skeleton.
- Rocks and Minerals
- Live Animals
