= Roses Rugby Football Club =

- Full name: Roses Rugby Football Club
- Union: USA Rugby
- Nickname(s): Roses
- Founded: 1974
- Ground(s): Centerville Middle School
- President: Eric Garman
- Coach(es): Kevin LaPorte & Bryan Hynes
- League(s): Eastern Pennsylvania Rugby Union
Team kit

Official website
- www.pitchero.com/clubs/yorklancasterrosesrugbyclub/

The Roses Rugby Football Club, (Roses RFC), is a rugby union team based in Lancaster, Pennsylvania. The club competes in, and is governed by, the Eastern Pennsylvania Rugby Union, the Mid Atlantic Rugby Football Union, and USA Rugby.

Even though the Roses RFC plays in the city of Lancaster, the team formally extends its player membership and marketing to the nearby city of York. The team plays most of its home matches at Centerville Middle School in Lancaster, and at the York College of Pennsylvania.

== History ==
- In 2004, the Roses fell to Norfolk Blues in the MARFU Division II Finals match earning their first trip to the USA Rugby Sweet Sixteen.
- In 2005, the Roses won their first MARFU Division II championship. The Roses then defeated the Oxy Tigers from Los Angeles, CA and Charleston, SC respectively in the USA sweet 16 tourney held in Providence, RI. In San Diego, CA for the National Final Four the Roses fell on the first day to Atlanta Old White and on the second day to the Boca Raton, FL giving them a #4 rank in the USA.
- In 2006, the Roses fell to Raleigh, NC in the MARFU Division II Finals Match.
- In 2009, the Roses Won Marfu again, defeating defending champs Brandywine RFC. The Roses then defeated Providence, RI and Milwaukee West Side Harlequins, respectively in the USA sweet 16 tourney held in Columbia, SC to earn themselves a #2 ranking in the USA Final Fours held in Glendale, CO. In Colorado, the roses fell on the first day to the Albuquerque Aardvarks and in sudden death triple overtime on the second day to the Indianapolis Impalas giving them a #4 rank in the USA.

== Recruiting ==
Roses RFC has established relationships with high school and collegiate teams in the South Central Pennsylvania region, which have become feeder teams for the Roses. This allows the Roses to maintain a large player pool of young athletes. The team operates the Warwick Swarm, the York Roses, and the Hempfield Knightmares in the youth leagues and the York & Lancaster Thorns for women. The Roses RFC also has a relationship with the Athletic Department of the Millersville University of Pennsylvania, York College of Pennsylvania and Shippensburg University.

The Swarm Rugby Team consists of schools near Warwick High School, Manheim Central, Manheim township, and Penn Manor High School. The Hempfield Knightmares only consists of their school district. Both teams are in the same division and play for the Rugger Cup. Both Teams play against school districts such as Unionville High School, West Chester, Dolphin county, Allentown, and other schools nearby. The Swarm Rugby team plays games on Lincoln Avenue while the Knightmares play at Hemphfield High School. Players from the youth clubs often join the Roses club after high school or exceed the age limit for the players, 18-19 year old.
