= Louise Arnold Tanger Arboretum =

Arboretum in Lancaster, Pennsylvania, US

Coordinates: 40.0426°N 76.3298°W

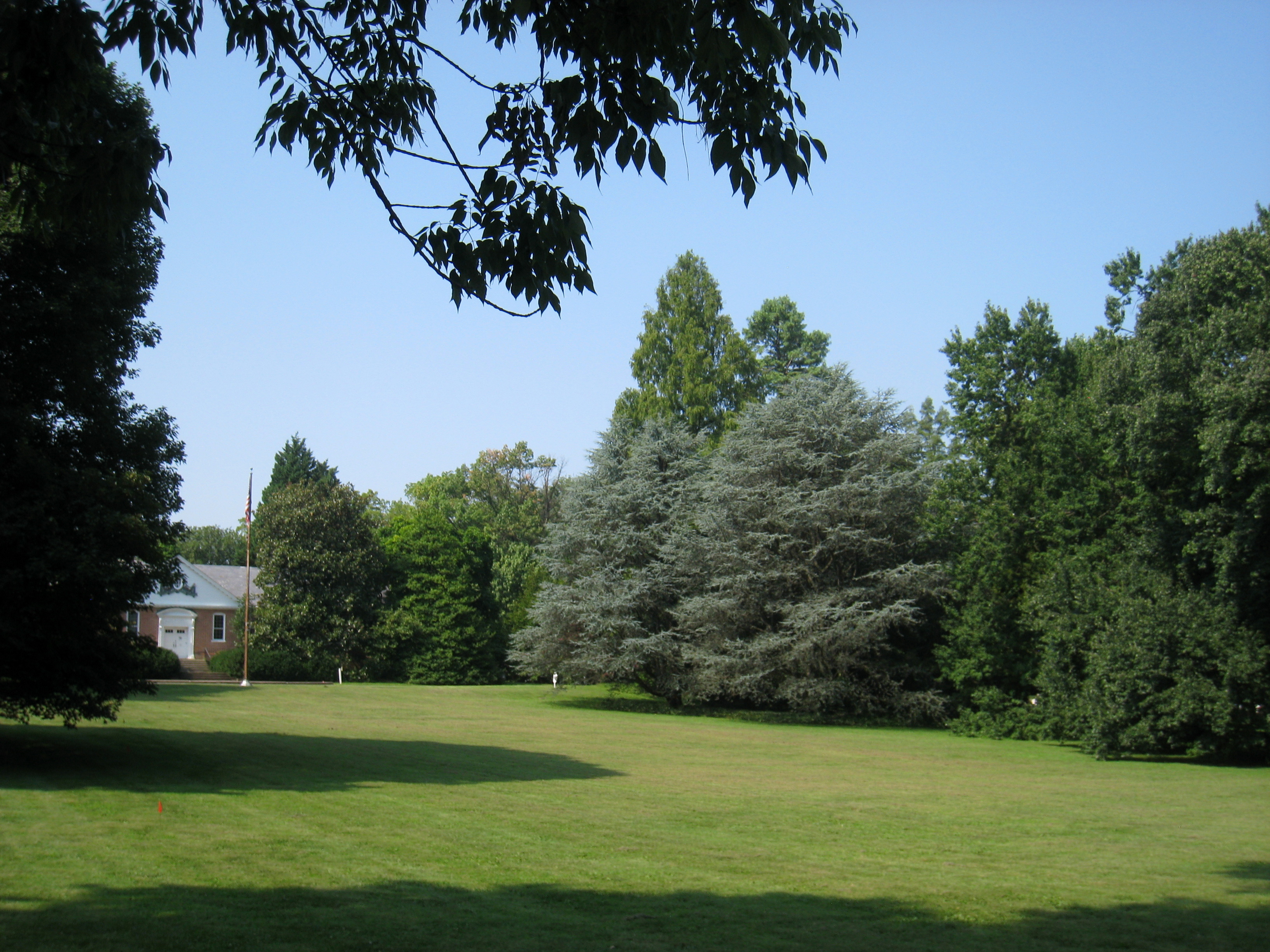
- Interactive map of Louise Arnold Tanger Arboretum
- Type: Arboretum
- Location: 230 North President Avenue, Lancaster, Pennsylvania
- Area: 5 acres (2.0 ha)

Louise Arnold Tanger Arboretum is a 5 acres (2.0 ha) arboretum located on the grounds of the Lancaster County Historical Society at 230 North President Avenue, Lancaster, Pennsylvania. The arboretum is open to the public daily.

The arboretum was established in 1959 after botanist Louise Arnold Tanger offered to plant trees on the grounds. The arboretum was designed by Gustav Malmborg and was named in honor of its instigator Mrs Tanger. It now contains 104 varieties of trees including American chestnuts, beeches, firs, and three Franklinia trees.

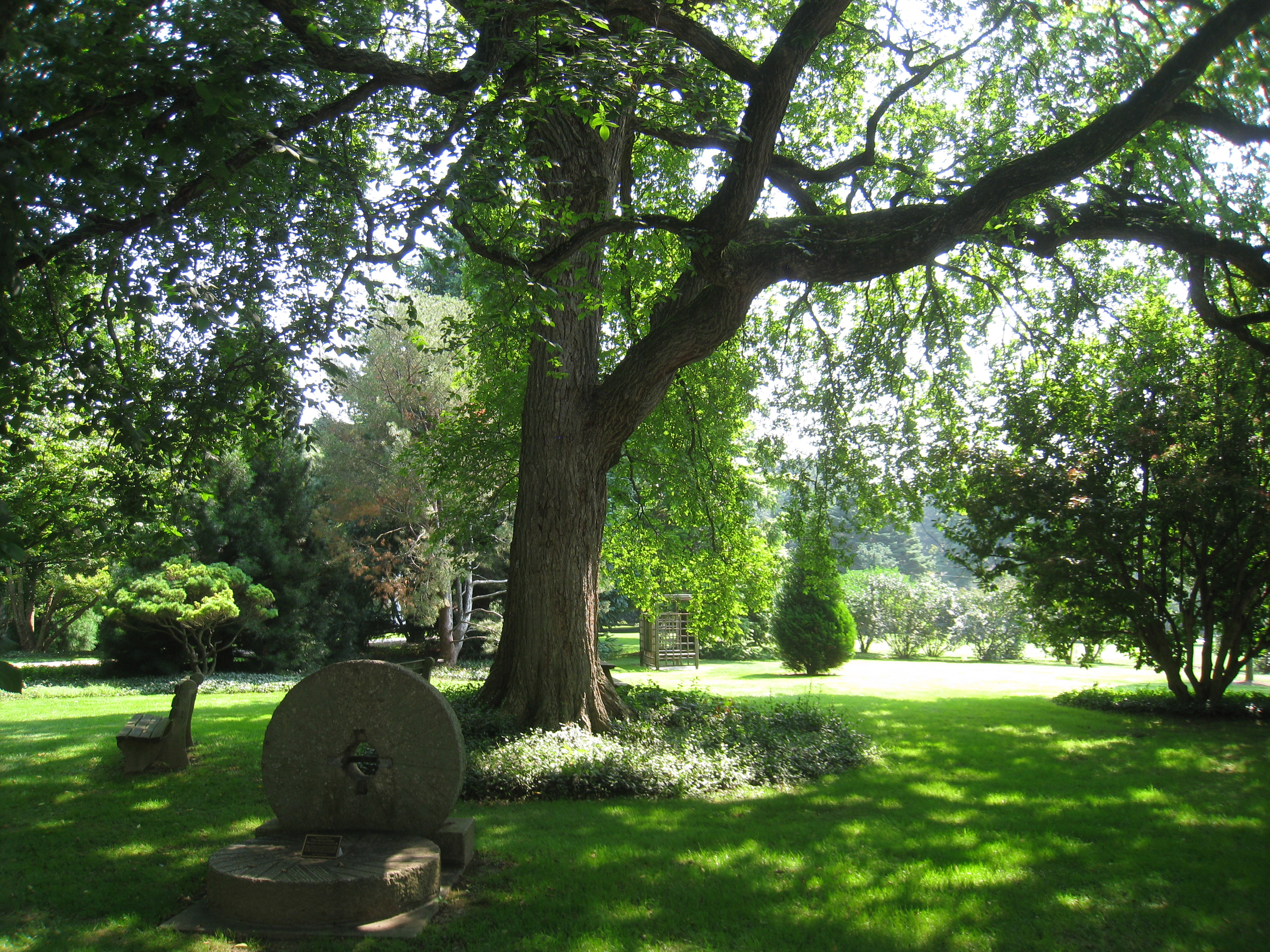

== See also ==
- List of botanical gardens in the United States
