= Lancaster, Pennsylvania =

City in Pennsylvania, United States

Lancaster Lengeschder (Pennsylvania German)
- City
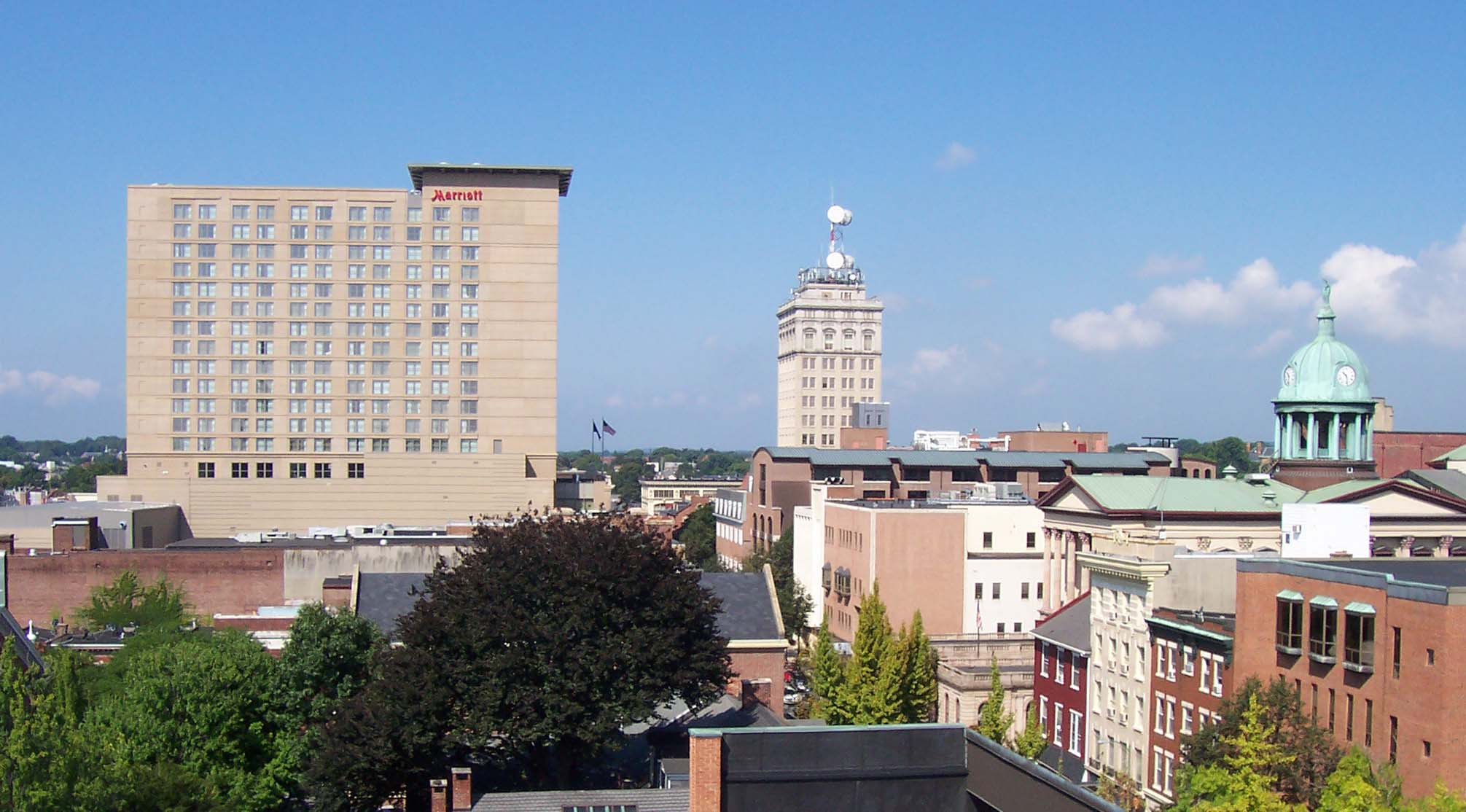
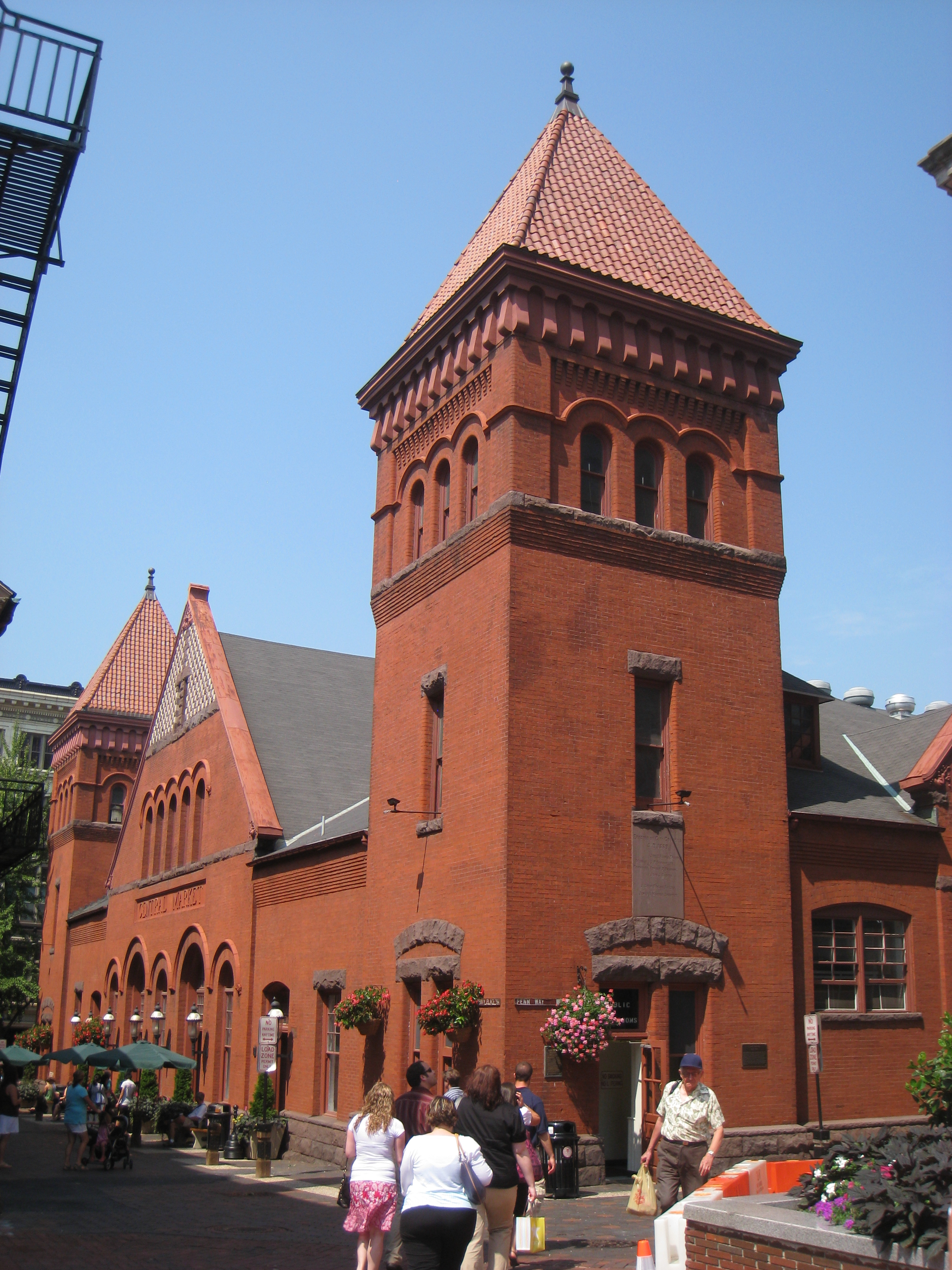
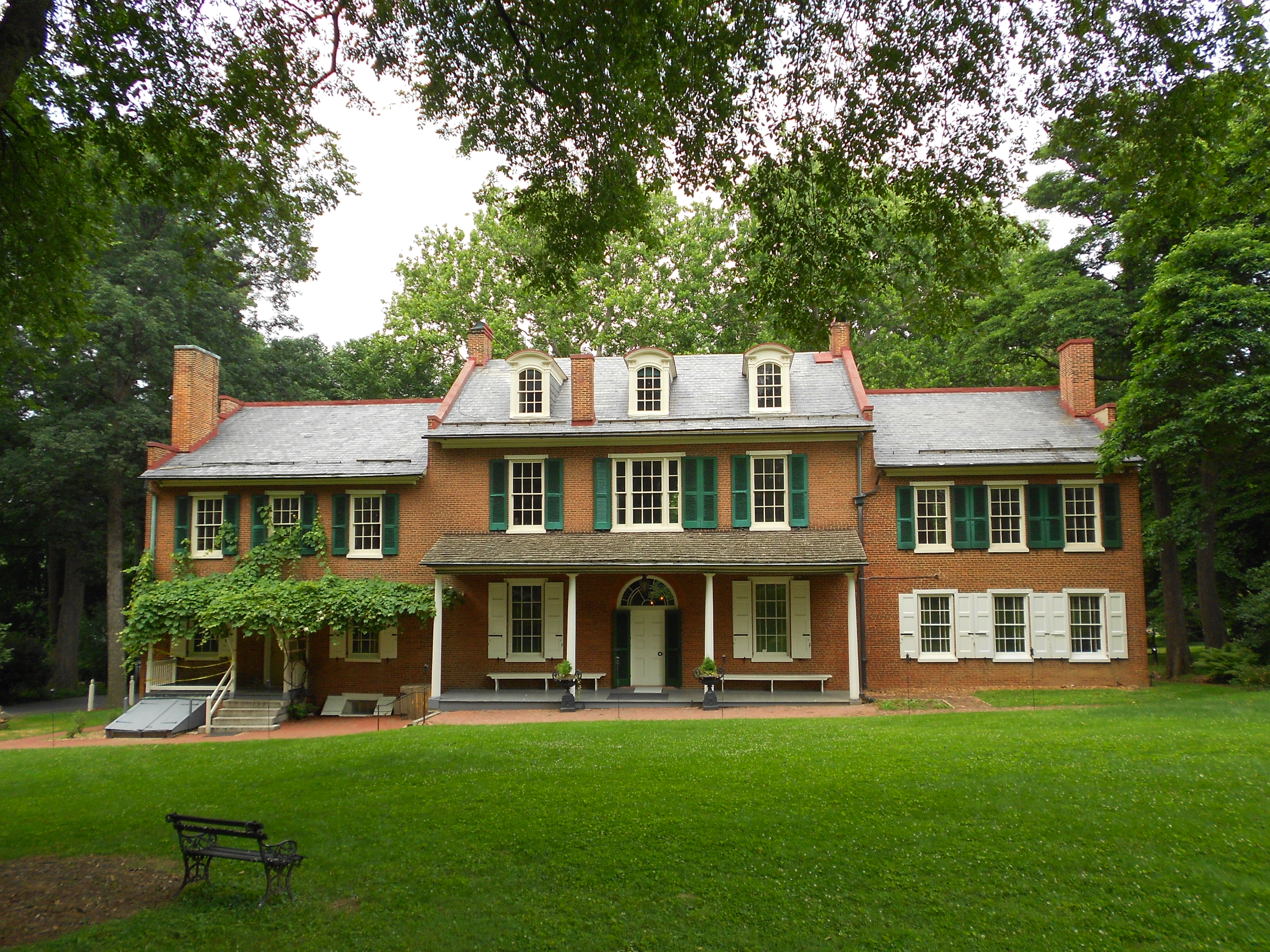
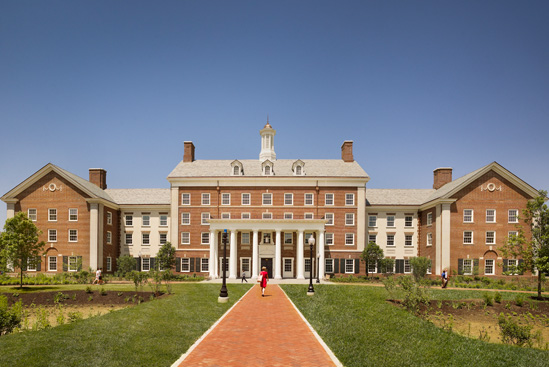
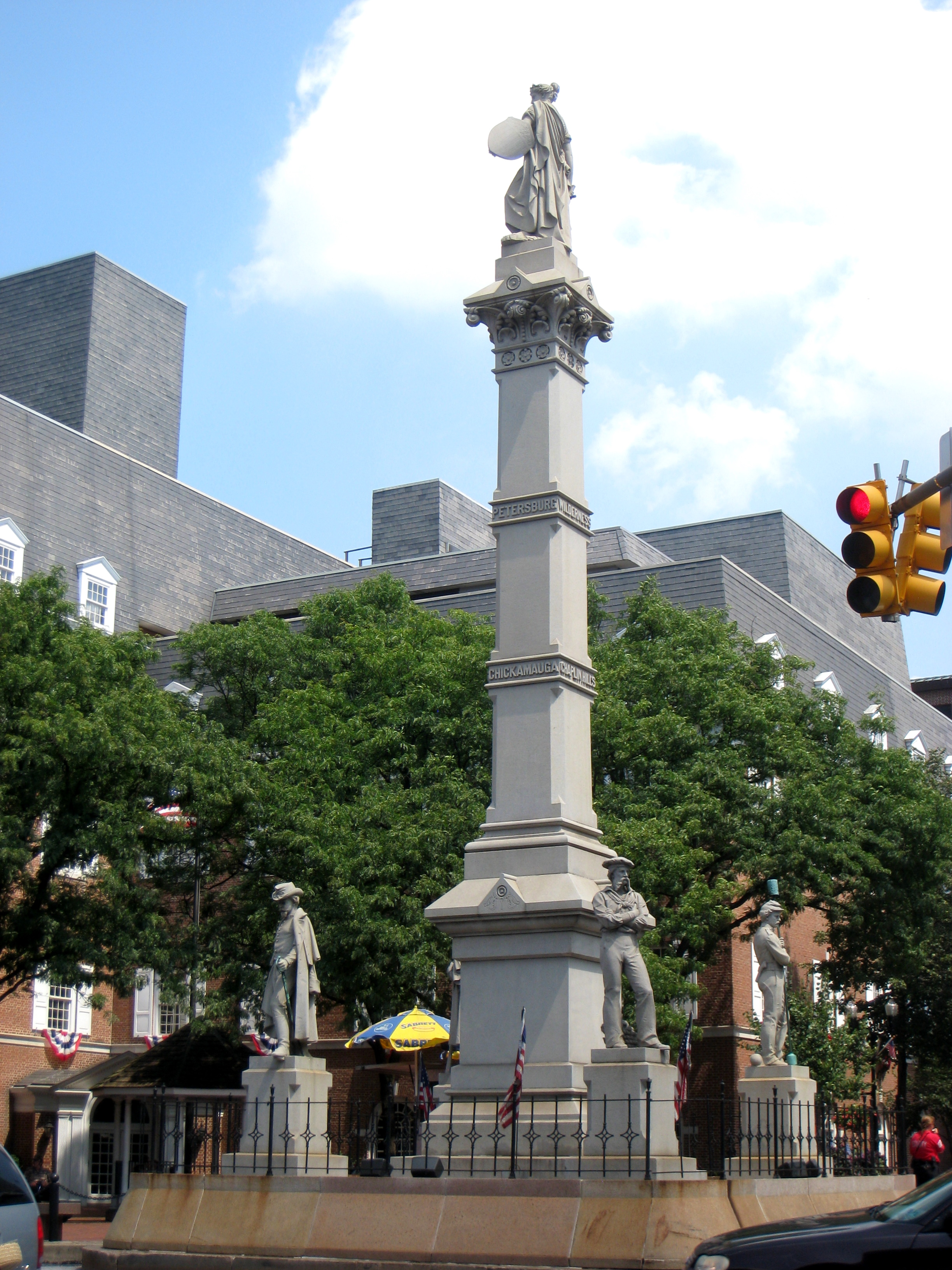
- Lancaster skyline Central Market Wheatland Franklin & Marshall College Soldiers and Sailors Monument

- Flag Seal Logo
- Nickname: The Red Rose City
- Interactive map of Lancaster
- Location within Pennsylvania Location within the United States
- Coordinates (Penn Square): 40°2′23″N 76°18′16″W
- Country: United States
- State: Pennsylvania
- County: Lancaster
- Founded: 1729
- Incorporated: 1742 (borough); 1818 (city)
- Founder: James Hamilton
- Named for: Lancaster, Lancashire, England

Government
  - Type: Strong mayor − council
  - Mayor: Jaime Arroyo (D)
  - City council: Member List: Amanda Bakay - President; Jamie Arroyo; Lochard Calixte; Faith Craig; Janet Diaz; John Hursh

Area
  - City: 7.35 sq mi (19.03 km^{2})
  - Land: 7.23 sq mi (18.72 km^{2})
  - Water: 0.12 sq mi (0.31 km^{2})
  - Metro: 802 sq mi (2,080 km^{2})
- Elevation: 368 ft (112 m)

Population (2020)
  - City: 58,039
  - Rank: 10th in Pennsylvania
  - Density: 8,031/sq mi (3,100.6/km^{2})
  - Urban: 394,531 (US: 107th)
  - Urban density: 2,173/sq mi (839.1/km^{2})
  - Metro: 552,984 (US: 104th)
- Demonym: Lancastrians
- Time zone: UTC−5 (EST)
  - Summer (DST): UTC−4 (EDT)
- ZIP Codes: 17573, 17601−17608, 17611, 17622, 17699
- Area codes: 717 and 223
- FIPS code: 42-41216
- Website: cityoflancasterpa.gov

Lancaster (Note: /ˈlæŋkəstər/ LANG-kə-stər; Pennsylvania German: Lengeschder) is a city in Lancaster County, Pennsylvania, United States, and its county seat. With a population of 58,039 at the 2020 census, it is the eighth-most populous city in the state. It is a core city within South Central Pennsylvania, with 552,984 residents in the Lancaster metropolitan area.

Settled in the 1720s, Lancaster is one of the oldest inland cities in the US. It served as the capital of Pennsylvania from 1799 to 1812. The city's primary industries include healthcare, tourism, public administration, manufacturing, and both professional and semi-professional services. Lancaster is located 59 miles (95 km) southwest of Allentown and 61 miles (98 km) west of Philadelphia and is a hub of Pennsylvania Dutch Country.

== History ==
=== 18th century ===
Originally called Hickory Town, Lancaster was renamed after the English city of Lancaster by native John Wright. Its symbol, the red rose, is from the House of Lancaster. Lancaster was part of the 1681 Penn's Woods Charter of William Penn, and was laid out by James Hamilton in 1734. It was incorporated as a borough in 1742 and incorporated as a city in 1818.

In the summer of 1744 the Lancaster courthouse was the venue for an important colonial treaty between the Haudenosaunee Confederacy and the Provinces of Pennsylvania, Maryland, and Virginia. Conrad Weiser served as interpreter, and the text of the treaty was soon after published by Benjamin Franklin.

During the American Revolution, Lancaster served for one day as the temporary capital of the United States, seated at the Court House (built 1739, destroyed by fire in 1784 and rebuilt before relocating to current Lancaster County Courthouse in 1852; original site is now the Soldiers & Sailors Monument at Penn Square c. 1874), on September 27, 1777, after the Continental Congress fled Philadelphia, which had been captured by the British. The revolutionary government then moved still farther away to York, Pennsylvania.

A surviving mid-18th-century Torah ark lintel from the Lancaster home of Joseph Simon reflects the use of private homes for traditional Jewish prayer in colonial cities without synagogues. Its carving depicts the Tablets of the Law and bears the Hebrew phrase “Know before Whom you are standing.”

=== 19th century ===
Lancaster was the capital of Pennsylvania from 1799 to 1812, with the state capital located at the Court House (built 1784 and demolished 1852 and now site of Soldiers & Sailors Monument at Penn Square). In 1812, the capital was moved to Harrisburg, where it has remained since.

U.S. census reports show that, from 1800 to 1900, Lancaster ranked among the nation's top 100 most populous urban areas.

In 1851, the current Lancaster County Prison, known locally as Lancaster Castle, was built in the city but shares no visual similarities with the Lancaster Castle in England. The prison remains in use, and was used for public hangings until 1912. It replaced a 1737 structure on a different site.

The first long-distance paved road in the United States was the former Philadelphia and Lancaster Turnpike, which connected the cities of Lancaster and Philadelphia. Opened in 1795, the turnpike was paved with stone the whole way, and overlaid with gravel. The sixty-two-mile turnpike cost more than $450,000, a staggering sum for the time. The route followed what is now Pennsylvania Route 340 (also called the "Old Philadelphia Pike") from Lancaster to Thorndale and U.S. Route 30 Business and U.S. Route 30 from Thorndale to Philadelphia.

The city of Lancaster was home to several important figures in American history. Wheatland, the estate of James Buchanan, the fifteenth President of the United States, is one of Lancaster's most popular attractions. Thaddeus Stevens, considered among the most powerful members of the United States House of Representatives, lived in Lancaster as an attorney. Stevens gained notoriety as a Radical Republican and for his abolitionism. The Fulton Opera House in the city was named for Lancaster native Robert Fulton, a renaissance man who created the first fully functional steamboat. All of these individuals have had local schools named after them.

After the American Revolutionary War, Lancaster became an iron-foundry center. Two of the most common products needed by pioneers to settle the Frontier were manufactured in Lancaster: the Conestoga wagon and the Pennsylvania long rifle. The Conestoga wagon was named after the Conestoga River, which runs through the city. The innovative gunsmith William Henry lived in Lancaster and was a U.S. Congressman and leader during and after the American Revolution.

In 1803, Meriwether Lewis visited Lancaster to be educated in survey methods by the well-known surveyor Andrew Ellicott. During his visit, Lewis learned to plot latitude and longitude as part of his overall training needed to lead the Lewis and Clark Expedition.

In 1879, Franklin Winfield Woolworth opened his first successful five and dime store in the city of Lancaster, the F. W. Woolworth Company.

=== 20th and 21st centuries ===
Lancaster was one of the winning communities for the All-America City award in 2000.

In 2009, a community organization installed and began monitoring 164 closed-circuit cameras in Lancaster, which engendered some local opposition.

On October 13, 2011, Lancaster's City Council officially recognized September 27 as Capital Day, a holiday recognizing Lancaster's one day as capital of the United States in 1777.

Lancaster receives 20 times more refugees per capita than the rest of the United States, leading it to be dubbed "America's refugee capital" in 2015. Between 2005 and 2019, nearly 5,000 refugees were resettled in Lancaster. Lancaster announced its designation as a Certified Welcoming City in 2019. Nobel laureate Malala Yousafzai visited Lancaster in 2017 to honor its commitment to refugees, an experience she detailed in her book We Are Displaced. Lancaster City Council voted to end cooperation with U.S. Immigration and Customs Enforcement in 2024.

== Geography ==
Lancaster is located in the Piedmont region of Pennsylvania. It lies slightly north of the Conestoga River, a left tributary of the Susquehanna River. According to the U.S. Census Bureau, the city has a total area of 7.35 square miles (19.0 km^{2}), of which, 7.23 square miles (18.7 km^{2}) of it is land and 1.65% is water.

=== Neighborhoods ===
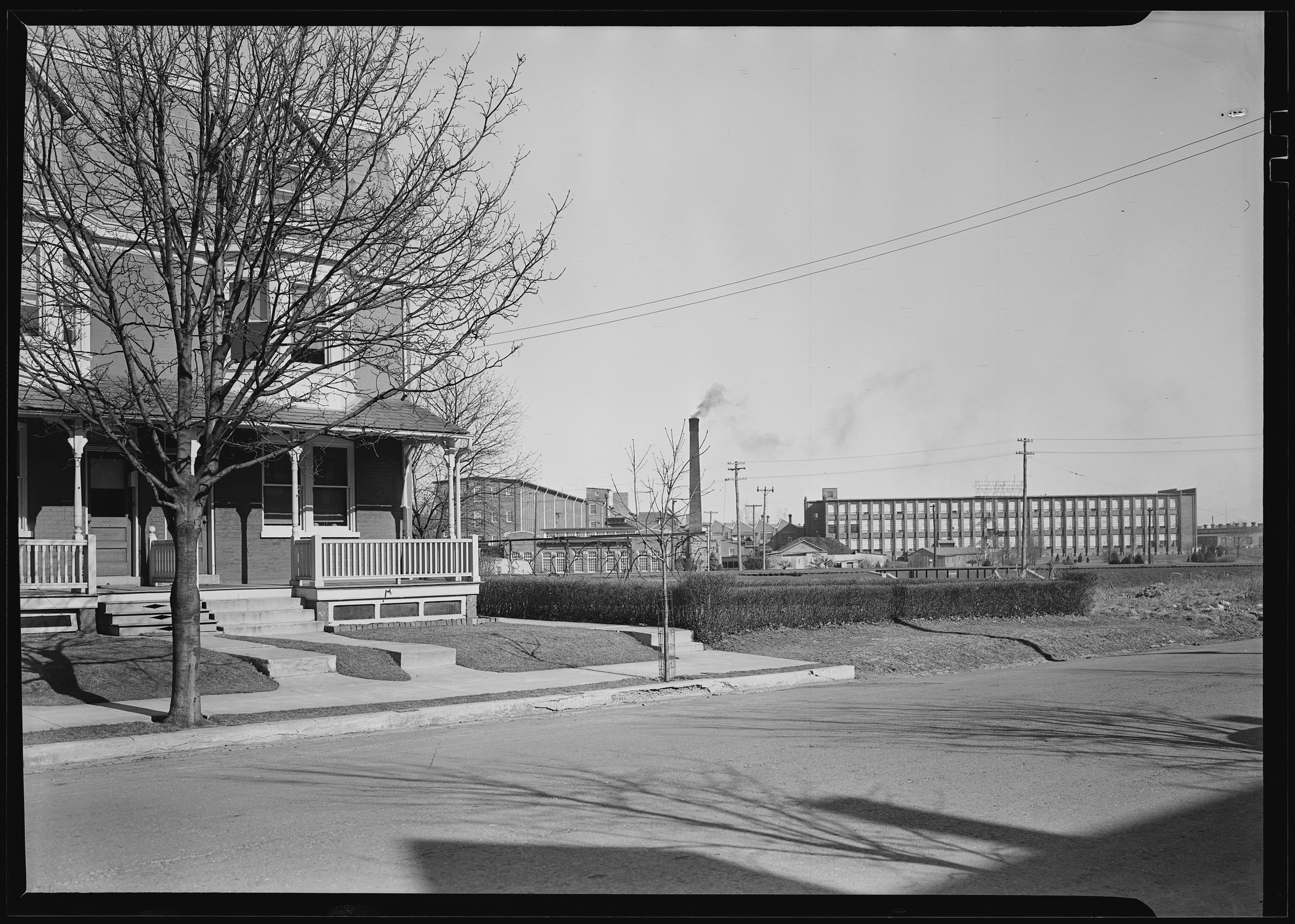
Row houses and Stehli mills, a c. 1941 photo by Lewis Hine

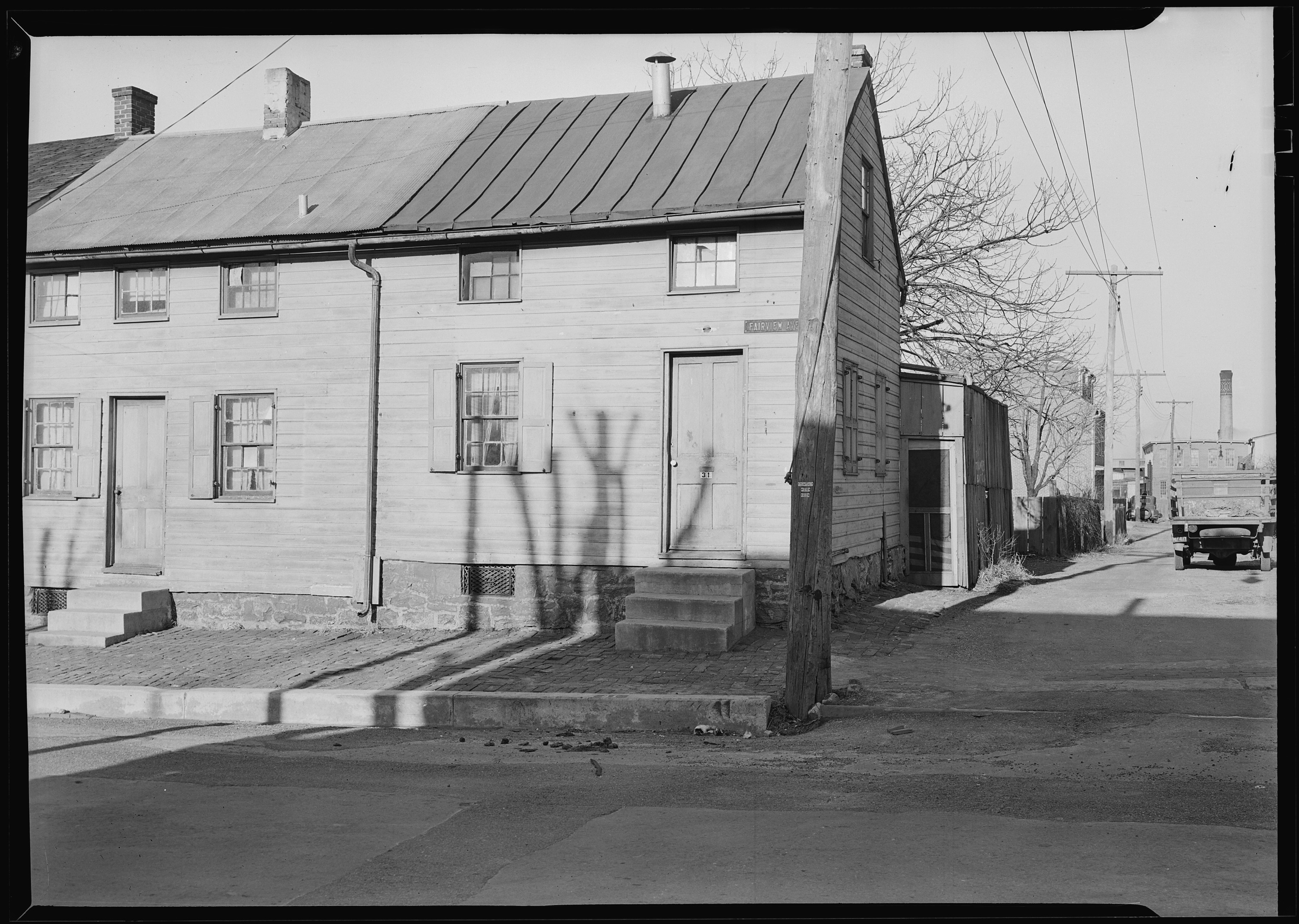
Cabbage Hill, a c. 1941 photo by Lewis Hine

- Cabbage Hill/The Hill (named for the cabbage patches kept by ethnic Germans in this area)
- Chestnut Hill
- Downtown/Center City
- Downtown Investment District
- Historic East Side
- Eighth Ward
- Gallery Row/Arts District
- Galebach Ward
- Northwest Corridor
- Penn Square
- Prospect Heights
- Seventh Ward
- Sixth Ward
- Uptown
- West End
- Woodward Hill
- Musser Park
- Mussertown

=== Climate ===
Under the Köppen climate classification, Lancaster falls within either a hot-summer humid continental climate (Dfa) if the 0 °C (32 °F) isotherm is used or a humid subtropical climate (Cfa) if the −3 °C (27 °F) isotherm is used. The hottest recorded temperature in the city was 107 °F (42 °C) on August 7, 1918, while the coldest recorded temperature was −16 °F (−27 °C) on January 22, 1984. On average, the city receives 42 inches of precipitation a year. September is the wettest month of the year and February the driest. The snowiest winter on record for Lancaster was the winter of 2009-10 when 72 inches of snow fell and the smallest amount of snow on record was when four inches fell during the winter of 1949–50. The highest recorded January temperature was 77 °F (25 °C) on January 26, 1950, and the coldest July temperature 42 °F (6 °C) on July 4, 1918.

On average, the city receives 203 days of sun a year. The shortest days of the year are between December 18 and December 25, when day length is nine hours and 19 minutes. The sun reaches its lowest point in the sky of 26° between December 11 and December 31. The longest days of the year are June 19 to June 23, reaching 15 hours and one minute. The sun reaches its highest point in the sky of 73° from June 10 to July 2.

Climate data for Lancaster, Pennsylvania (1991–2020 normals, extremes 1894–present)
Month	Jan	Feb	Mar	Apr	May	Jun	Jul	Aug	Sep	Oct	Nov	Dec	Year
Record high °F (°C)	77 (25)	82 (28)	88 (31)	94 (34)	99 (37)	103 (39)	104 (40)	107 (42)	99 (37)	95 (35)	86 (30)	76 (24)	107 (42)
Mean maximum °F (°C)	61.3 (16.3)	62.3 (16.8)	72.9 (22.7)	84.1 (28.9)	89.8 (32.1)	92.9 (33.8)	95.2 (35.1)	93.8 (34.3)	89.7 (32.1)	81.8 (27.7)	72.4 (22.4)	63.1 (17.3)	96.5 (35.8)
Mean daily maximum °F (°C)	39.9 (4.4)	42.8 (6.0)	52.0 (11.1)	64.6 (18.1)	74.5 (23.6)	82.7 (28.2)	87.0 (30.6)	85.1 (29.5)	78.2 (25.7)	66.4 (19.1)	54.8 (12.7)	44.4 (6.9)	64.4 (18.0)
Daily mean °F (°C)	31.0 (−0.6)	33.2 (0.7)	41.4 (5.2)	52.6 (11.4)	62.4 (16.9)	71.2 (21.8)	75.9 (24.4)	74.1 (23.4)	66.9 (19.4)	55.1 (12.8)	44.4 (6.9)	35.7 (2.1)	53.7 (12.1)
Mean daily minimum °F (°C)	22.2 (−5.4)	23.6 (−4.7)	30.9 (−0.6)	40.5 (4.7)	50.4 (10.2)	59.7 (15.4)	64.7 (18.2)	63.0 (17.2)	55.6 (13.1)	43.7 (6.5)	34.0 (1.1)	27.1 (−2.7)	42.9 (6.1)
Mean minimum °F (°C)	6.5 (−14.2)	8.4 (−13.1)	16.6 (−8.6)	27.7 (−2.4)	36.3 (2.4)	46.8 (8.2)	54.9 (12.7)	52.4 (11.3)	42.4 (5.8)	30.5 (−0.8)	21.2 (−6.0)	13.1 (−10.5)	3.7 (−15.7)
Record low °F (°C)	−27 (−33)	−18 (−28)	−2 (−19)	11 (−12)	21 (−6)	32 (0)	42 (6)	37 (3)	29 (−2)	19 (−7)	−7 (−22)	−9 (−23)	−27 (−33)
Average precipitation inches (mm)	3.01 (76)	2.52 (64)	3.50 (89)	3.54 (90)	3.65 (93)	4.09 (104)	4.51 (115)	3.60 (91)	4.82 (122)	4.18 (106)	3.26 (83)	3.47 (88)	44.15 (1,121)
Average snowfall inches (cm)	6.1 (15)	7.4 (19)	3.4 (8.6)	0.2 (0.51)	0.0 (0.0)	0.0 (0.0)	0.0 (0.0)	0.0 (0.0)	0.0 (0.0)	0.3 (0.76)	0.6 (1.5)	3.4 (8.6)	21.4 (54)
Average precipitation days (≥ 0.01 in)	10.0	8.8	10.5	10.9	12.7	11.1	10.3	9.7	9.5	9.9	9.6	10.9	123.9
Average snowy days (≥ 0.1 in)	2.7	2.7	1.2	0.1	0.0	0.0	0.0	0.0	0.0	0.0	0.3	1.1	8.1
Source: NOAA

== Demographics ==
Historical population
Census	Pop.	Note	%±
1790	3,762		—
1800	4,292		14.1%
1810	5,405		25.9%
1820	6,633		22.7%
1830	7,704		16.1%
1840	8,417		9.3%
1850	12,369		47.0%
1860	17,603		42.3%
1870	20,233		14.9%
1880	25,769		27.4%
1890	32,011		24.2%
1900	41,459		29.5%
1910	47,227		13.9%
1920	53,150		12.5%
1930	59,949		12.8%
1940	61,345		2.3%
1950	63,774		4.0%
1960	61,055		−4.3%
1970	57,690		−5.5%
1980	54,725		−5.1%
1990	55,551		1.5%
2000	56,348		1.4%
2010	59,322		5.3%
2020	58,039		−2.2%
2024 (est.)	58,441		0.7%

=== 2020 census ===
As of the 2020 census, Lancaster had a population of 58,039. The median age was 32.7 years; 22.5% of residents were under the age of 18 and 11.3% were 65 years of age or older. For every 100 females there were 96.5 males, and for every 100 females age 18 and over there were 94.0 males age 18 and over.

Of those residents, 40.3% were Hispanic/Latino, 38.9% were non-Hispanic White, 12.6% were non-Hispanic Black, 3.8% were Asian, and 4.4% identified as mixed or other races.

100.0% of residents lived in urban areas, while 0.0% lived in rural areas.

There were 22,131 households in Lancaster, of which 29.3% had children under the age of 18 living in them. Of all households, 30.0% were married-couple households, 23.5% were households with a male householder and no spouse or partner present, and 35.5% were households with a female householder and no spouse or partner present. About 33.0% of all households were made up of individuals and 9.8% had someone living alone who was 65 years of age or older.

There were 23,769 housing units, of which 6.9% were vacant. The homeowner vacancy rate was 1.8% and the rental vacancy rate was 4.2%.

Racial composition as of the 2020 census
Race	Number	Percent
White	26,476	45.6%
Black or African American	8,726	15.0%
American Indian and Alaska Native	375	0.6%
Asian	2,268	3.9%
Native Hawaiian and Other Pacific Islander	26	0.0%
Some other race	11,782	20.3%
Two or more races	8,386	14.4%
Hispanic or Latino (of any race)	23,341	40.2%

=== 2010 census ===
As of the 2010 census, the city was 55.2% White, 16.3% Black or African American, 0.7% Native American, 3.0% Asian, 0.1% Native Hawaiian, and 5.8% were two or more races. 39.3% of the population were of Hispanic or Latino ancestry.

=== 2000 census ===
As of the 2000 census, there were 56,348 people, 20,933 households, and 12,162 families residing in the city. The population density was 7,616.5 people per square mile (2,940.7 people/km^{2}). There were 23,024 housing units at an average density of 3,112.1 per square mile (1,201.6/km^{2}). The racial makeup of the city was 61.55% White, 14.09% African American, 0.44% Native American, 2.46% Asian, 0.08% Pacific Islander, 17.44% from other races, and 3.94% from two or more races. 30.76% of the population were Hispanic or Latino people of any race.

There were 20,933 households, out of which 31.6% had children under the age of 18 living with them, 33.4% were married couples living together, 19.0% had a female householder with no husband present, and 41.9% were non-families. 33.1% of all households were made up of individuals, and 9.9% had someone living alone who was 65 years of age or older. The average household size was 2.52 and the average family size was 3.23.

In the city, the population was spread out, with 27.5% under the age of 18, 13.9% from 18 to 24, 30.5% from 25 to 44, 17.7% from 45 to 64, and 10.5% who were 65 years of age or older. The median age was 30 years. For every 100 females, there were 95.2 males. For every 100 females age 18 and over, there were 91.4 males.

The median income for a household in the city was $29,770, and the median income for a family was $34,623. Males had a median income of $27,833 versus $21,862 for females. The per capita income for the city was $13,955. 21.2% of the population and 17.9% of families were below the poverty line. 29.2% of those under the age of 18 and 12.9% of those 65 and older were living below the poverty line. Poverty in Lancaster is twice the state's average, and public school records list more than 900 children as homeless.

Although there are many Amish people from this area, not everyone from Lancaster is Amish, contrary to popular belief.

=== Ethnic groups ===
The largest ethnic groups in Lancaster as of recent estimates are:

- Puerto Rican 29.2%
- German 21.2%
- African American 12.8%
- Irish 8.6%
- English 8.2%
- Italian 4.1%
- Dominican 3.2%
- Polish 2.0%
- Scottish 1.9%
- Mexican 1.8%
- Cuban 1.7%
- West Indian 1.0%

In 2010, 29.2% of Lancaster residents were of Puerto Rican ancestry. The city has the second highest concentration of Puerto Ricans in Pennsylvania after Reading. For this reason, it is sometimes referred to as the "Spanish Rose." Lancaster celebrates its Puerto Rican heritage once every year with the Puerto Rican Festival.

== Economy ==
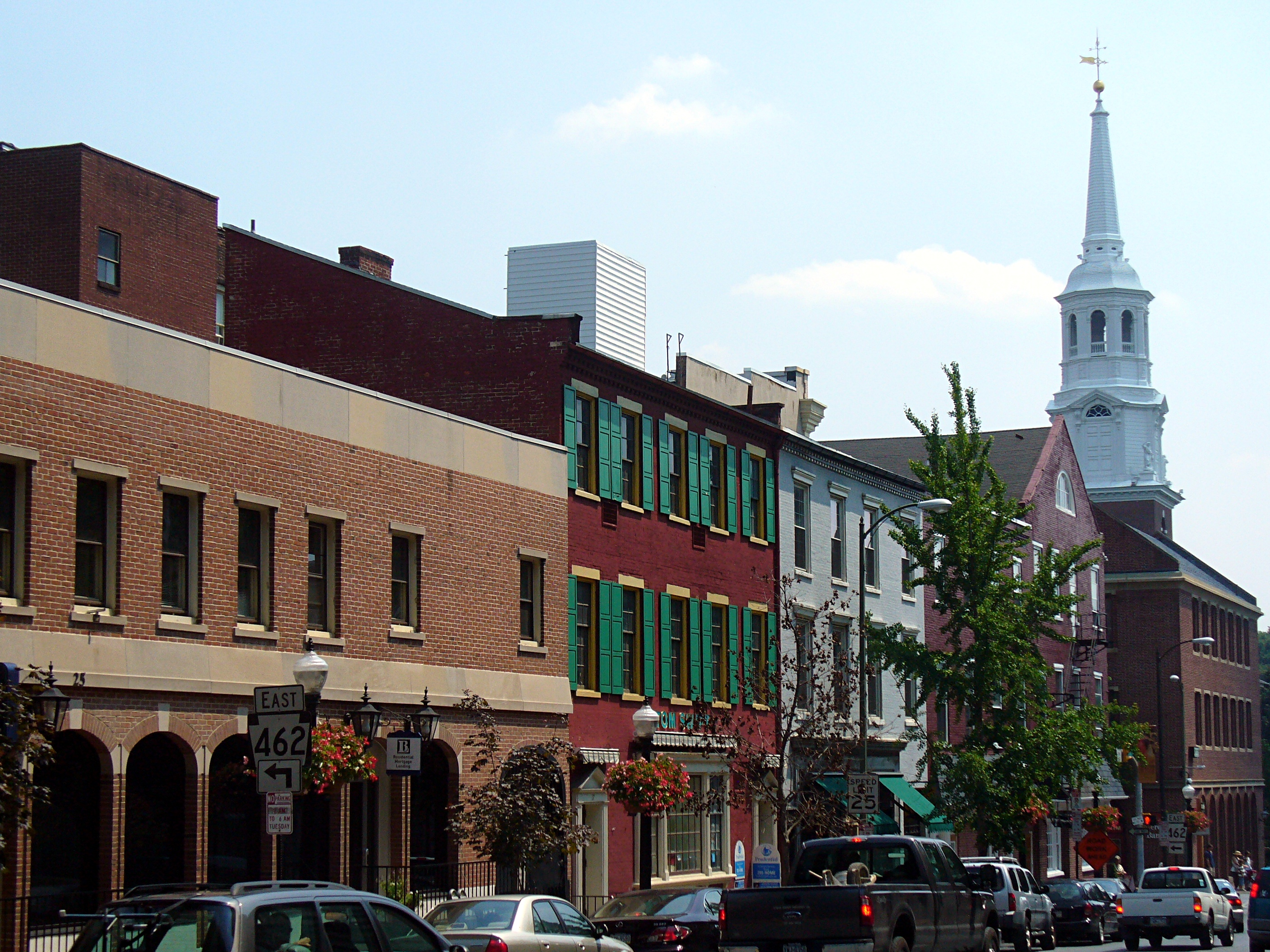
Lancaster streetscape

Since 2005, Lancaster's downtown has increased the number of specialty shops, boutiques, bars, clubs, and galleries.

Burle Business Park, the city's only commercial and industrial park. originally opened in 1942 as a U.S. Navy electronics research, development and manufacturing plant operated by RCA. The facility was purchased after World War II by RCA. Burle Business Park was originally occupied by Burle Industries, the successor company to RCA, and a manufacturer of vacuum tube products. Burle completed a voluntary clean-up under the Pennsylvania Land Recycling Program.

=== Shopping ===
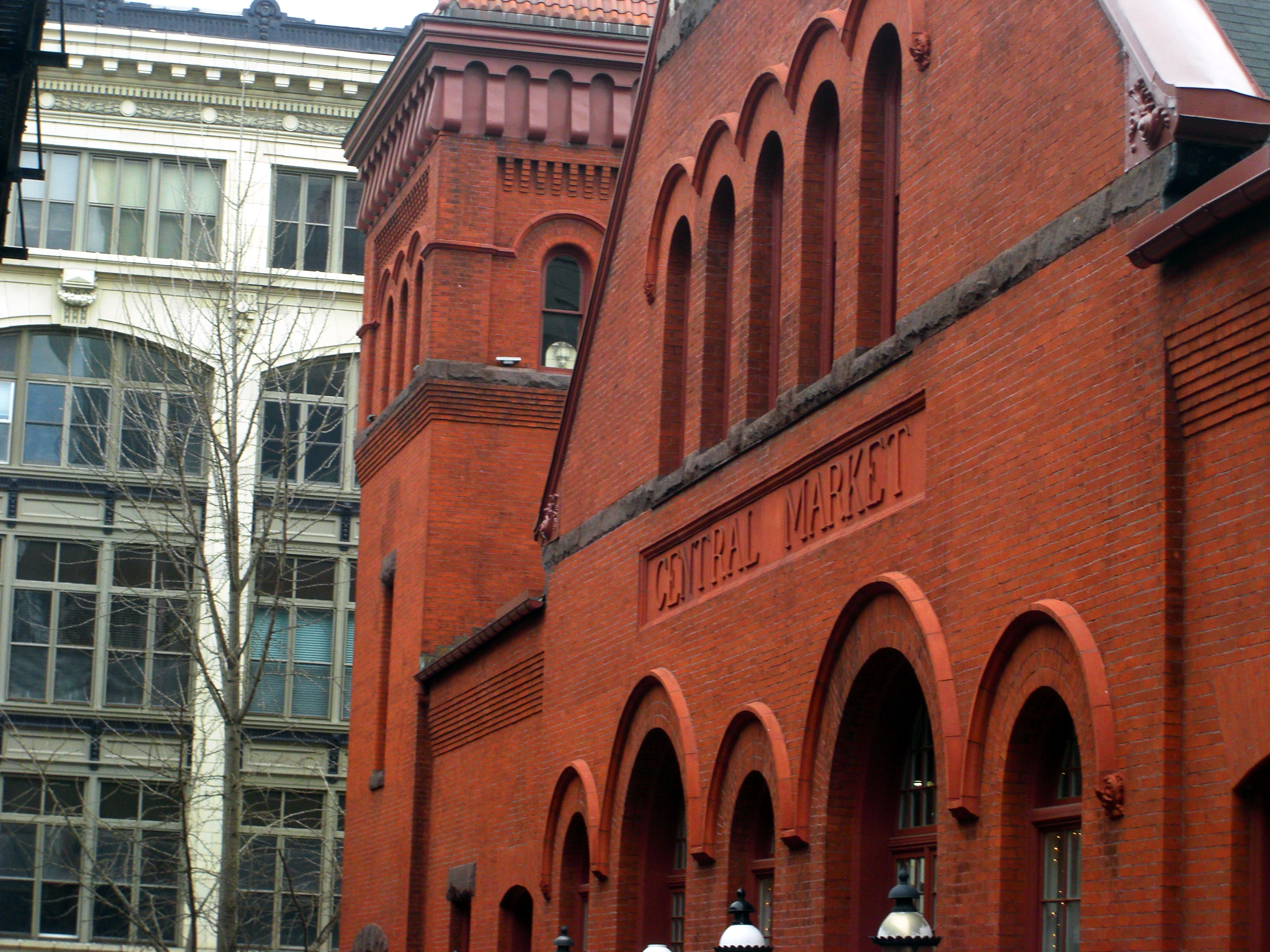
Lancaster Central Market

In addition to Lancaster's boutiques, vintage shops, and art galleries (Gallery Row), Park City Center is the largest enclosed shopping center in South Central Pennsylvania. The mall includes more than 150 stores and is anchored by Boscov's, JCPenney, and Kohl's. Park City opened in September 1971.

Built in 1889, the Lancaster Central Market is the oldest continuously operated farmers market in the United States, and many tourists come to purchase the handmade Amish goods that are not commonly found elsewhere. Central Market is listed with the National Register of Historic Places, and its towers are of the Romanesque Revival style. The market underwent renovations beginning in July 2010.

Lancaster also has two outlet shopping centers, both of which are located in East Lampeter Township on U.S. Route 30. Tanger Outlets is home to about 65 stores. The Shops at Rockvale contains over 100 stores and restaurants.

=== Top employers ===
According to Lancaster's 2018 Comprehensive Annual Financial Report, the top employers in the city are:

#	Employer	# of employees
1	Lancaster General Hospital	9,406
2	Giant Food Stores	Data not available
3	County of Lancaster	1,681
4	Nordstrom, Inc.	Data not available
5	Lancaster Laboratories	Data not available
6	School District of Lancaster	1,646
7	Dart Container Corporation	Data not available

== Arts and culture ==
=== Historical landmarks ===
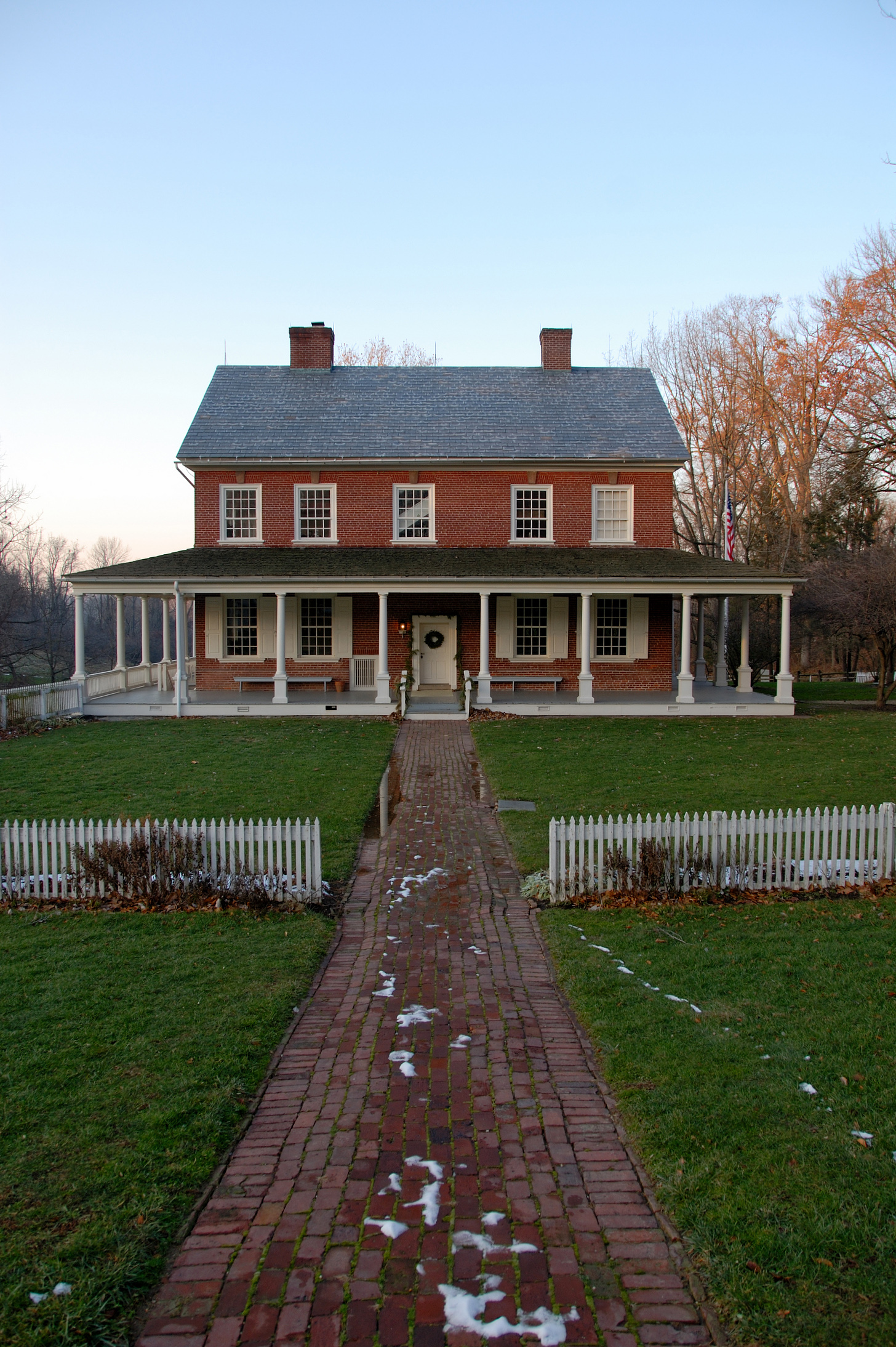
Historic Rock Ford

Many of Lancaster's landmarks are significant in local, state, and national history.

- Central Market – built in 1889, it is the oldest continuously run farmers' market in the United States.
- Bethel African Methodist Episcopal Church – built in 1879, the church's congregation aided freedmen migrating to the North for opportunities after the American Civil War. Their congregation had earlier aided fugitive slaves fleeing the South before the war, using their former church as a station on the Underground Railroad.
- Cork Factory Hotel – built in 1865 as Conestoga Cork Works. Later the buildings making up what is known today as Urban Place were home to Armstrong Cork Factory and Kerr Glass Company. Rezoned in 2005, Urban Place has been adapted as 49 loft-style apartments, 115,000 square feet of retail and commercial space, the Cork Factory Hotel, and Cap & Cork Restaurant.
- Fulton Opera House – the oldest continually running theater in the United States, it is one of three theaters designated as National Historic Landmarks (the others are the Walnut Street Theatre in Philadelphia and the Goldenrod Showboat in St. Louis, Missouri).
- Hamilton Watch Complex – former factory and headquarters of the Hamilton Watch Company, which in 1957 sold the world's first battery-powered watch, the Hamilton Electric 500.
- Historic Rock Ford – built in 1794, this was the home of General Edward Hand, adjutant general to George Washington during the American Revolutionary War. Since 2021, the John J. Snyder, Jr. Gallery, located on the second floor of Historic Rock Ford's red barn, showcases Lancaster decorative arts from the 18th and early 19th centuries.
- J. P. McCaskey High School – built in 1938 during the Great Depression, it is designed in the Art Deco architectural style.
- Historic St. Mary's Church – built in 1854, this church has served the German-speaking Catholics of Lancaster since 1741.
- Lancaster Arts Hotel – Built in 1881, this building was the Falk and Rosenbaum Tobacco Warehouse. In October 2006, the warehouse reopened after adaptation, as Lancaster's first boutique hotel for the arts. It has 63 guest rooms (including 12 suites); an organic restaurant, John J Jeffries; and an on-site art gallery. It is registered with the Historic Hotels of America.
- Lancaster County Prison – built in 1849, it was styled after the Lancaster Castle in England.
- Unitarian Universalist Church of Lancaster, Pennsylvania - built in 1908–1909 in what is now the Historic District of Lancaster, it is unique among the buildings by C. Emlen Urban and contains stained glass by Franz Xaver Zettler (designed by Swiss-American architect Woldemar H. Ritter) and by Charles Connick.
- W. W. Griest Building – listed on the U.S. National Register of Historic Places since June 25, 1999. It was built in 1925 in the Beaux-Arts style using granite, limestone, terra cotta, synthetics, and asphalt. The building is named after William Walton Griest, a former Pennsylvania representative. It is the second-tallest building in the city.
- Wheatland – the historic estate of James Buchanan, the 15th president of the United States.

=== Art and museums ===
The city of Lancaster has art, craft and historical museums. The Demuth Museum is located in the former home of the well-known painter Charles Demuth, who had a national reputation in the 20th century. Additional museums include the Lancaster Museum of Art and the Philips Museum of Art on the campus of Franklin & Marshall College. Art students at the state-of-the-art Pennsylvania College of Art and Design present their works at the academy's gallery, which is open to the public. LancasterARTS, a non-profit organization founded in 2002, promotes contemporary arts and crafts.

Lancaster city has a thriving art community. Gallery Row on the 100 block of North Prince St. features a block of art galleries, and the city proper has over 40 galleries and artists' studios. The galleries host a "First Friday" each month, extending their business hours to exhibit new artwork and new artists to the public.

The Lancaster County Quilts and Textile Museum, completed in 2007, celebrates the art of the hand-sewn quilts and other textile items produced by women of the region's Amish and Mennonite communities. The museum was closed in 2011. The Lancaster Mennonite Historical Society Museum and the Heritage Center Museum display artifacts and interpret the region's unique history. Children can have a hands-on experience with educational learning at the Hands-on House, also known as the Children's Museum of Lancaster. Nature and geology-minded visitors can view the exhibits of the Louise Arnold Tanger Arboretum and the North Museum of Nature and Science.

The National Watch & Clock Museum, founded in 1977, has the largest collection of clocks and watches in North America.

Stevens and Smith Historic Site is located within the Vine Street lobby of the Lancaster County Convention Center. The site includes the preserved home of U.S. Senator Thaddeus Stevens and his companion Lydia Hamilton Smith. The underground portion of the site includes a recently discovered Underground Railroad feature: a converted water cistern used in the antebellum years to hide fugitive slaves on their way to freedom.

In Lancaster County, the Landis Valley Museum in Manheim Township has exhibits that interpret the county's history and culture, especially as a center of ethnic German Amish and Mennonite culture.

=== Music and entertainment ===
The Lancaster Symphony Orchestra has been performing since 1947. OperaLancaster was founded as Lancaster Opera Workshop in 1951 and presented operas in the city from 1952 until 2021 when it merged with the Penn Square Music Festival and Penn Square Conservatory of Music to form the current Penn Square Opera. The Fulton Opera House is one of the oldest working theaters in the United States. The Ware Center hosts live theater, concerts, and performances.

== Sports ==
Club	League	Sport	Venue	Capacity	Founded	Championships
Lancaster Stormers	ALPB	Baseball	Penn Medicine Park	6,000	2005	(4) 2006, 2014, 2022, 2023
Pennsylvania Classics	NPSL	Men's soccer	Georgelis Law Firm Stadium (Landisville)	2,000	2021	
Lancaster Inferno FC	USL W League	Women's soccer	Tylus Field	500	2008	

=== College athletics ===
Lancaster is home to Franklin & Marshall College and its various sports teams, including the Diplomats football team. The Diplomats play their home games at Shadek Stadium in Lancaster. Shadek Stadium was built in 2017 and surrounds Tom Gilburg Field. Aside from football, Shadek Stadium also hosts men's and women's lacrosse.

The Centennial Conference is headquartered in Lancaster, co-founded by Franklin & Marshall College in 1981.

=== Baseball ===
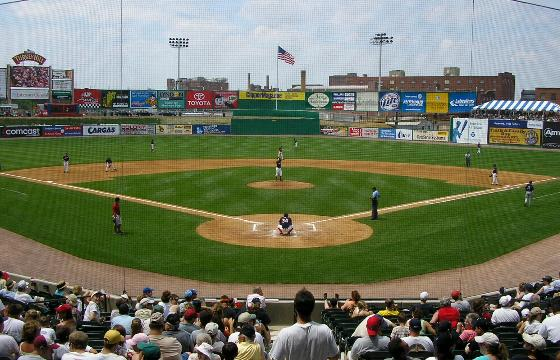
Penn Medicine Park, the homefield of the Lancaster Stormers

The Lancaster Stormers played their inaugural season in 2005, ending Lancaster's 44-year period without professional baseball since the demise of the Red Roses. Their main Atlantic League rival is the Revolution from nearby York.

Lancaster is the hometown of Major League Baseball alumnus Tom Herr. He played for the St. Louis Cardinals for the majority of his career. He also played for the Minnesota Twins, Philadelphia Phillies, New York Mets, and the San Francisco Giants. Herr subsequently coached the Hempfield High School Black Knights baseball team for several years. He also managed the Lancaster Stormers in their first season. The Stormers have won the Atlantic League Championship four times: in 2006, 2014, 2022, and 2023.

=== Cycling ===
The Lancaster Bicycle Club hosts an annual Covered Bridge Metric Century bicycle race. In 2010, more than 2,500 riders participated.

The city of Lancaster hosted the Tom Bamford Lancaster Classic, an international, professional bicycle racing event held each June since 1992. It was part of the 2006–2007 UCI America Tour and the 2007 USA Cycling Professional Tour.

=== Golf ===
Professional golf is well represented by the Professional Golf Association's Jim Furyk. He placed 4th in the 1998 and 2003 Masters tournament, won the 2003 U.S. Open, placed fourth in the 1997, 1998, and 2006 British Open, and placed sixth in the 1997 PGA championship. Furyk also won the Vardon Trophy in 2006. He is an alumnus of Manheim Township High School, located in the immediate suburb of Manheim Township.

The 2015 and 2024 U.S. Women's Open tournaments were held at the Lancaster Country Club.

=== Soccer ===
Lancaster has both a men's and a women's semi-professional soccer club. Pennsylvania Classics AC plays in the National Premier Soccer League, a fourth-tier in the American soccer pyramid. Lancaster Inferno FC play in the USL W League, a second-tier league. The city also has an amateur team called Lancaster City FC that plays other regional clubs in the United Soccer League of Pennsylvania.

=== Field hockey ===
In 2013, USA Field Hockey announced their intentions to move their national training center for the United States women's national field hockey team to Lancaster County. They signed with Spooky Nook Sports through 2022 after searching for many years for a northeastern site. At the high school level, nearby Warwick High School has consistently won PIAA state championships.

=== Amateur sports in Lancaster ===
Lancaster's suburban area hosts several amateur sports teams. Ice hockey is represented by the Central Penn Panthers, a member of the junior-level Atlantic Metropolitan Hockey League, and both the Lancaster Firebirds, and Regency Panthers youth amateur ice hockey organization of the USA Hockey's Atlantic District. American football is represented by the Lancaster Lightning, a member of the semi-professional North American Football League, that plays in nearby Kinzers. A close cousin of American football, rugby, is represented by the Roses Rugby Football Club of the Mid Atlantic Rugby Football Union, of which the Roses RFC were the 2005 champions. Roller derby is represented by the Dutchland Derby Rollers, an all-female roller derby team which plays to raise money for various charities, and is currently ranked #23 in the world by Derby News Network.

=== Historical Lancaster teams ===
The Lancaster Red Roses of the Eastern Professional Baseball League are the most well-known of Lancaster's defunct teams. They played from 1906 to 1909, and from 1940 to their last season in 1961. The Red Roses were called the "Lancaster Maroons" from 1896 to 1899 and the "Lancaster Red Sox" in 1932.

The "Lancaster Red Roses" was also the name of a basketball franchise in the Continental Basketball Association (at that time, the Eastern Professional Basketball League) from 1946 to 1949, and from 1953 to 1955. The CBA later hosted another Lancaster team called the Lightning from 1981 to 1985. The Lightning later moved to Rockford, Illinois, where they played until the 2007 season. The Storm of the Eastern Basketball Alliance played from 1997 to 2000, winning the league championship in 1999. The last professional basketball team to call Lancaster home was the Liberty, who played as a member of the now-defunct Global Professional Basketball League in 2009.

== Government ==
=== Local ===
Lancaster operates under a mayor/council form of government. On November 7, 2017, former Councilwoman Danene Sorace was elected Lancaster's 43rd mayor, the second woman to serve in the role. The city council is composed of seven members: President Amanda Bakay, Vice President Jaime Arroyo, and councilors Ahmed Ahmed, Lochard Calixte, Faith Craig, Janet Diaz, and John Hursh.

In May 2023, Lancaster voters passed a ballot measure allowing the City Council to create a commission to study the adoption of home rule for Lancaster City. The resulting Home Rule Study Commission voted to draft a home rule charter in January 2024.

=== Federal ===
While Lancaster County as a whole tilts heavily Republican, the city of Lancaster leans heavily Democratic. Registered Democrats held a 13,000 voter registration advantage over registered Republicans in the city as of June 2009. U.S. presidential candidate Barack Obama easily won the city of Lancaster, receiving 76% of the vote during the 2008 presidential election.

Federally, Lancaster is part of Pennsylvania's 11th congressional district, represented by Republican Lloyd Smucker of nearby West Lampeter Township.

The state's senior member of the United States Senate is Democrat John Fetterman, first elected in 2022. The state's junior member of the United States Senate is Republican Dave McCormick, first elected in 2024. The Governor of Pennsylvania is Democrat Josh Shapiro, first elected in 2022. Additionally, the city of Lancaster is the headquarters of the Constitution Party.

Lancaster was home to Democrat James Buchanan, the fifteenth president of the United States. Buchanan arrived in Lancaster in 1809 to practice law. He took up residence near the courthouse on N. Duke Street. In 1848 he purchased Wheatland, a Federal style mansion in the suburbs. He was elected president in 1856.

== Education ==
Education in Lancaster is provided by many private and public institutions. The School District of Lancaster runs the city's public schools. Established in 1836, it is the second oldest school district in Pennsylvania.

The local high school campuses are McCaskey and McCaskey East. Lancaster Catholic High School has a long history in the county; it was founded in 1926. It currently falls under the jurisdiction of the diocese of Harrisburg. With a P-12 enrollment of more than 500 students, Lancaster Country Day School is one of the region's largest independent nonsectarian schools. Founded in 1908 as the Shippen School for Girls, the school became coeducational and relocated from downtown Lancaster to its Hamilton Road address in 1949. La Academia Partnership Charter School, opened in 1998, serves grades 6–12. It is the only public charter school in Lancaster County, and is open to any student residing in the county. Manheim Township School District is a four-year public high school located in Lancaster. It is the only high school in the Manheim Township School District. It is supported by a 7th and 8th grade middle school, a 5th and 6th grade intermediate school, and five elementary schools.

The Lancaster area hosts several colleges and universities, including Franklin & Marshall College, Lancaster Theological Seminary, Lancaster Bible College, Pennsylvania College of Art and Design, Thaddeus Stevens College of Technology, Millersville University of Pennsylvania, Central Pennsylvania College, Elizabethtown College and the Harrisburg Area Community College.

== Media ==
=== Print ===
- LNP, the county's predominant newspaper
- La Voz Hispana, the city's Spanish-language edition
- Sunday News, the county's weekly edition
- Fly Magazine, Lancaster City's Downtown Guide
- Fine Living Lancaster, a regional lifestyle magazine

=== Television and radio ===
TV stations
Call letters	Channel	Network	Location	Owner
WGAL 8	8.1	NBC	Lancaster	Hearst Corporation
WGAL–DT2	8.2	MeTV	Lancaster	Hearst Corporation
TeleCentro TV	Comcast 949	Public access	Lancaster	Spanish American Civic Association

Lancaster is part of the Harrisburg-Lancaster-York Television market.

FM stations
Call letters	Frequency	Format	Location	Owner
WFNM	89.1	College	Lancaster	Franklin and Marshall College
WJTL	90.3	Contemp. Christian	Lancaster	Creative Ministries
WIXQ	91.7	College	Millersville	Millersville University
WNUZ-LP	92.9	All News	Gap	WLRI Incorporated
WLAN-FM	96.9	CHR/Pop	Lancaster	IHM Licenses
WROZ	101.3	Religious	Lancaster	Educational Media Foundation

AM stations
WLAN-AM	1390	Tropical	Lancaster	IHM Licenses
WRKY	1490	Classic Rock	Lancaster	Forever Media
WVZN	1580	Spanish Christian	Columbia	Radio Vision Cristiana Management
WPDC-AM	1600	Oldies	Elizabethtown	JVJ Communications, Inc.

Lancaster is the 117th radio market in the United States. Market Type: 2 Book, Market Population: 472,200 (Hispanic Pop: 10%, Black Pop: 4%)

Radio portion: Neilsen Audio

== Infrastructure ==
=== Fire department ===
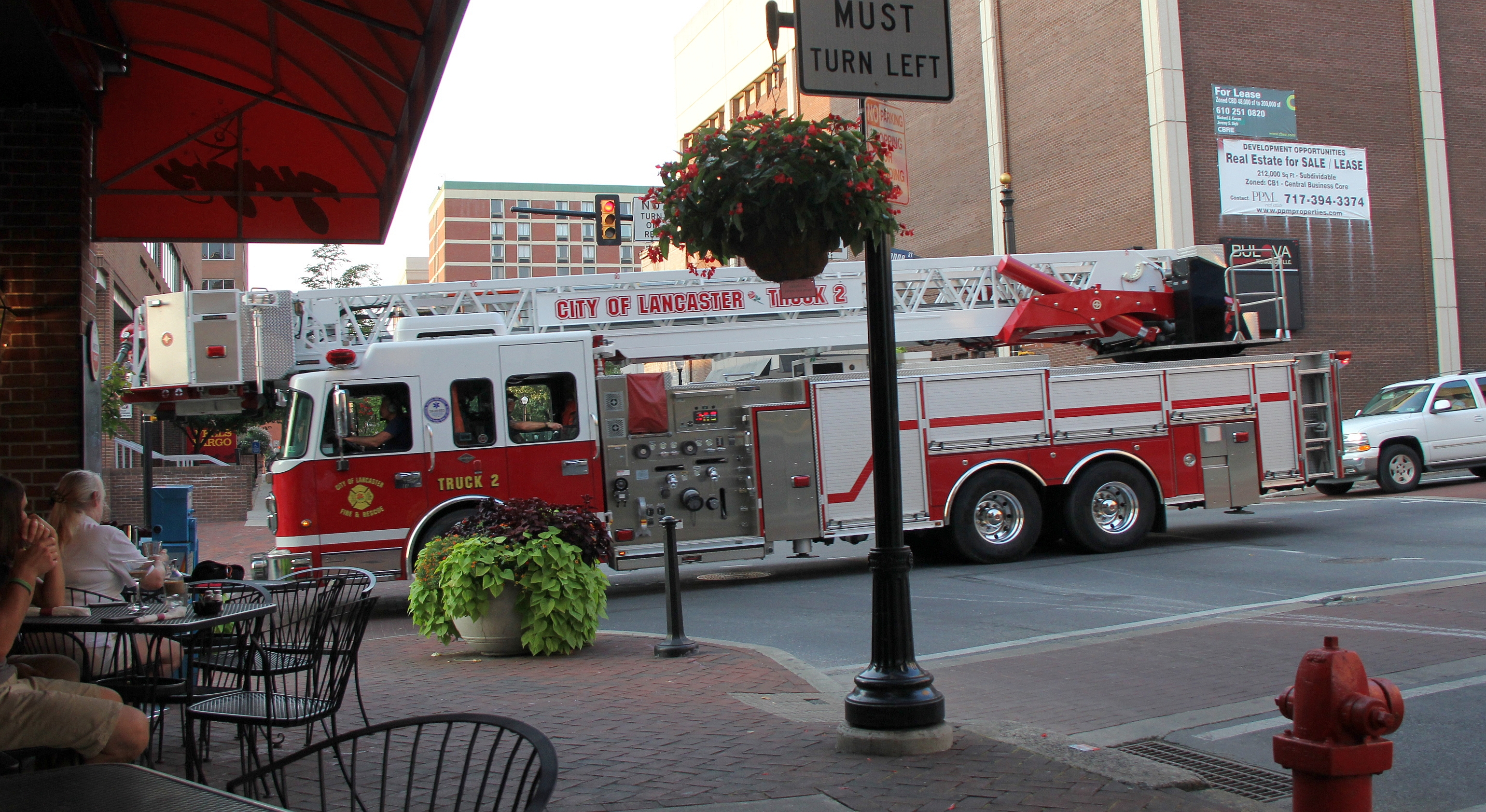
Fire vehicle in Lancaster

The Lancaster City Bureau of Fire operates three engine companies and one truck company. It was established on April 1, 1882, and has a total of 74 uniformed personnel. The Bureau responds to more than 3,000 emergency calls annually.

=== Police department ===
The city of Lancaster is protected by the City of Lancaster Bureau of Police. Founded in 1865, the Bureau of Police is located at 39 W. Chestnut Street in downtown Lancaster, and consists of approximately 147 sworn officers and 46 civilian employees. The Bureau of Police operates out of twelve sectors, or districts, and operates in four divisions, including Patrol, Criminal Investigative, Administrative Services, and Contracted Services. The Bureau also remains the largest law enforcement agency in Lancaster County.

=== Transportation ===
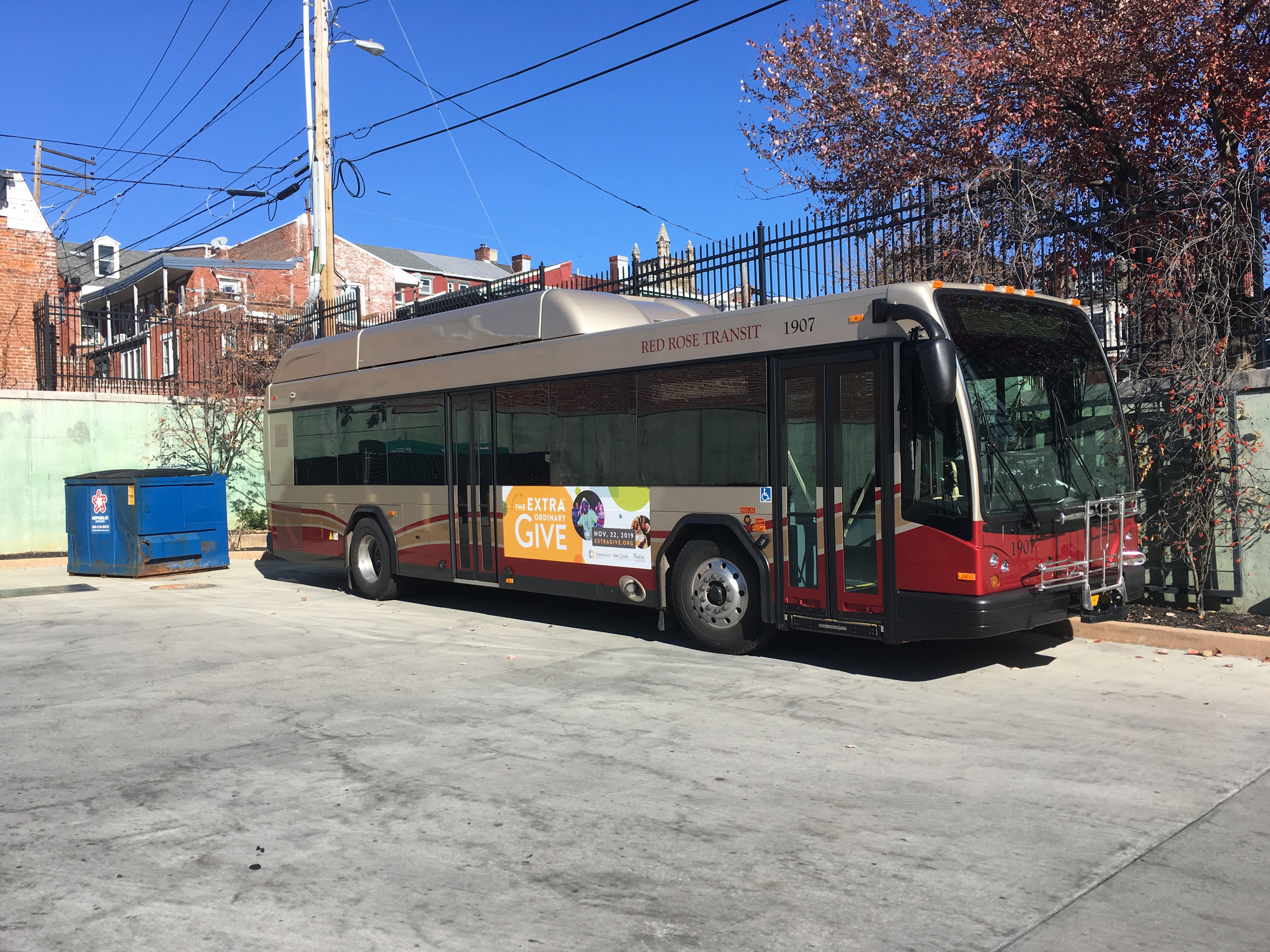
A Red Rose Transit Authority bus at Queen Street Station in downtown Lancaster

The Red Rose Transit Authority (RRTA) provides local public bus transit to the city of Lancaster and surrounding areas in Lancaster County. RRTA is headquartered outside the city of Lancaster. Queen Street Station in downtown Lancaster serves as a transit hub for several RRTA bus routes.

Bieber Transportation Group (formerly Capitol Trailways) formerly provided intercity bus transit from the Lancaster Train and Bus Station to Reading, Norristown, Philadelphia, and New York City to the east, and York to the west; service was discontinued on April 1, 2018. Intercity bus service from York and Lancaster to New York City was restored by OurBus in July 2018.

Amtrak also serves the Lancaster Train and Bus Station, located on the northernmost edge of the city at 53 East McGovern Avenue. The Pennsylvanian, with service between Pittsburgh and New York City via Philadelphia, as well as the Keystone Service, which runs from Harrisburg to New York City via Philadelphia, both serve Lancaster. The city is served by the Lancaster Airport, located six miles (9.7 km) north of downtown and just south of Lititz.

Highways include US 30, US 222, PA 283, PA 72, and PA 272.

=== Utilities ===
Electricity in Lancaster is provided by PPL Corporation in Allentown. UGI Utilities supplies natural gas to the city. The City of Lancaster Water Department provides water service to residents and businesses in the city. The city's Public Works department provides wastewater service to Lancaster, operating the City of Lancaster Advanced Wastewater Treatment Plant which serves the city and surrounding municipalities. Trash and recycling collection is provided by the city's Public Works department.

== Notable people and groups ==
- Israel Aaron (1859–1912), rabbi and scholar
- Chas Alecxih (born 1989), former professional football player for the Carolina Panthers
- Peter Andrelczyk (born 1985), former professional baseball player for the Miami Marlins and their farm system drafted out of Coastal Carolina College
- August Burns Red, metalcore band formed in 2003
- Benjamin Smith Barton (1766–1815), botanist, naturalist, and physician and one of the United States' first professors of natural history
- Billy Bletcher (1894–1979), actor
- Elias Bonine (1843–1916), photographer
- Will Bruey (born 1988), CEO of Varda Space Industries
- James Buchanan (1791–1868), lawyer, diplomat, and politician who served as the 15th president of the United States
- Shane Campbell (born 1994), soccer player
- Russell Canouse (born 1995), soccer player
- Kermit S. Champa (1939–2004), art historian
- Adam Cole (born 1989), professional wrestler currently signed to All Elite Wrestling (AEW)
- Giorgio De Marzi (born 2007), soccer player
- Michael Deibert (born 1973), author and journalist
- Charles Demuth (1883–1935), watercolorist and Precisionism painter
- Barney Ewell (1918–1996), Olympian who participated in the 1948 Summer Olympics
- FFH, contemporary Christian band formed in 1993
- From Ashes to New, rock band formed in 2013
- Jennifer Gareis (born 1970), actress
- Jonathan Groff (born 1985), actor and singer
- Tom Herr (born 1956), professional baseball second baseman, most notably, for the St. Louis Cardinals
- The Innocence Mission, folk pop group formed in 1986
- Travis Jankowski (born 1991), professional baseball outfielder for the New York Mets
- Billy Kametz (1987–2022), voice actor and former theatre actor
- Taylor Kinney (born 1981), actor and model
- Maria Louise Kirk (1860–1938), painter and book illustrator
- Nick Kurtz (born 2003), professional baseball first baseman for the Athletics
- Ed McCaskey (1919–2003), chairman of the Chicago Bears (1983–2003)
- Thomas Mifflin (1744–1800), merchant, soldier, and politician originally from Philadelphia
- John F. Reynolds (1820–1863), Union Army general in the American Civil War
- Brad Rutter (born 1978), highest-earning Jeopardy! contestant
- Mike Sarbaugh (born 1967), New York Mets base coach
- Evan Singleton (born 1992), strongman and former professional wrestler
- Anna Diller Starbuck (1868–1929), composer, music educator, organist, and pianist and one of the first two women to attend Harvard University
- Thaddeus Stevens (1792–1868), member of the United States House of Representatives
- Bruce Sutter (1953–2022), professional pitcher for the Chicago Cubs, St. Louis Cardinals, and Atlanta Braves
- Charlotte White (1782–1863), first unmarried American woman missionary sent to a foreign country
- Kristen Wiig (born 1973), Saturday Night Live actress and comedian
- Todd Young (born 1972), U.S. senator for Indiana
- Samuel P. Ziegler (1882–1967), painter, educator, musician

== Inventions and firsts ==
- The Conestoga wagon was first built in Lancaster, used extensively for migrations before the development of the railroad.
- The first Pennsylvania Rifle was created by Martin Meylin in the 1700s.
- Peeps, an Easter confection shaped as marshmallow chicks covered with yellow sugar, were invented by the Rodda Candy Company of Lancaster in the 1920s. In 1953, Rodda was purchased by Sam Born, the Russian immigrant who invented ice cream "jimmies", and production was moved to Bethlehem, Pennsylvania.
- The first battery-powered watch, the Hamilton Electric 500, was released in 1957 by the Hamilton Watch Company.
- The first fountain soda water dispenser was invented in 1819 by Samuel Fahnestock.

== Notes ==
Preceded by Philadelphia	Capital of the United States of America; 1777	Succeeded by York
