= Lancaster County Prison =

County prison in Lancaster, Pennsylvania, United States

Coordinates: 40°2′25″N 76°17′32″W

The Lancaster County Prison is a county prison located in Lancaster, Pennsylvania, in the United States. It is located on East King Street in Lancaster City.

== History ==
The prison was originally built in 1851 and renovated in 1972. The present medieval-style building replaced the earlier prisons in 1851, with Fulton Hall, of the Fulton Opera House being built on the site of the earlier prison. The prison is still in active use.

The design came from Lancaster Castle in the United Kingdom, which the city was named after.

It was used for public hangings until 1912.

== Present day ==
With over 5,000 admissions each year (and a similar number of discharges), Lancaster County Prison currently has beds for over 950 inmates, but has the capacity to accommodate more if needed.

The majority of those currently detained are imprisoned pending trial, the remaining 40% having already been sentenced. Prior to 2013, sentenced inmates were charged $10 per day for their incarceration, under the Lancaster County Prison "prisoner cost recovery program", in operation since 1995. Since that time there has been a flat fee of thirty dollars collected at intake or billed to the inmate if they haven't any cash on hand.
