= Samuel P. Ziegler =

American painter

Samuel Peters Ziegler
- Born: January 4, 1882; Lancaster, Pennsylvania, United States
- Died: April 7, 1967 (aged 85); Fort Worth, Texas, United States
- Education: Pennsylvania Academy of the Fine Arts, Philadelphia Musical Academy
- Occupations: Painter, printmaker, musician, professor
- Known for: Lithography, etching, painting, cello, music theory
- Spouse: Cora Amanda Kresge
- Children: 6

Samuel Peters Ziegler (January 4, 1882 – April 7, 1967) was an American painter, printmaker, musician, and educator. He taught for many years at Texas Christian University in Fort Worth, Texas; and served as the chair of the art department.

== Life ==
Samuel Peters Ziegler was born on January 4, 1882, in Lancaster, Pennsylvania. He was the child of Mary R. (née Peters) and Christian Ziegler.

He attended the Philadelphia Musical Academy (now the University of the Arts) and the Pennsylvania Academy of Fine Arts (now the Pennsylvania Academy of the Fine Arts). Ziegler studied under Hugh Henry Breckenridge, William Merritt Chase, and Thomas Pollock Anshutz. In 1912, Ziegler was awarded the Cresson European Traveling Scholarship which he used to travel for six months, and study in England, France, Belgium, Holland, Germany, and Italy.

In 1917, he started teaching at Texas Christian University in Fort Worth, Texas. He was the chair of the art department at Texas Christian University, from 1925 to 1953.

His paintings are in museum collections at the Texas Christian University campus, the Amon Carter Museum of Modern Art, and at the Modern Art Museum of Fort Worth.
