= W. W. Griest Building =

W.W. Griest Building
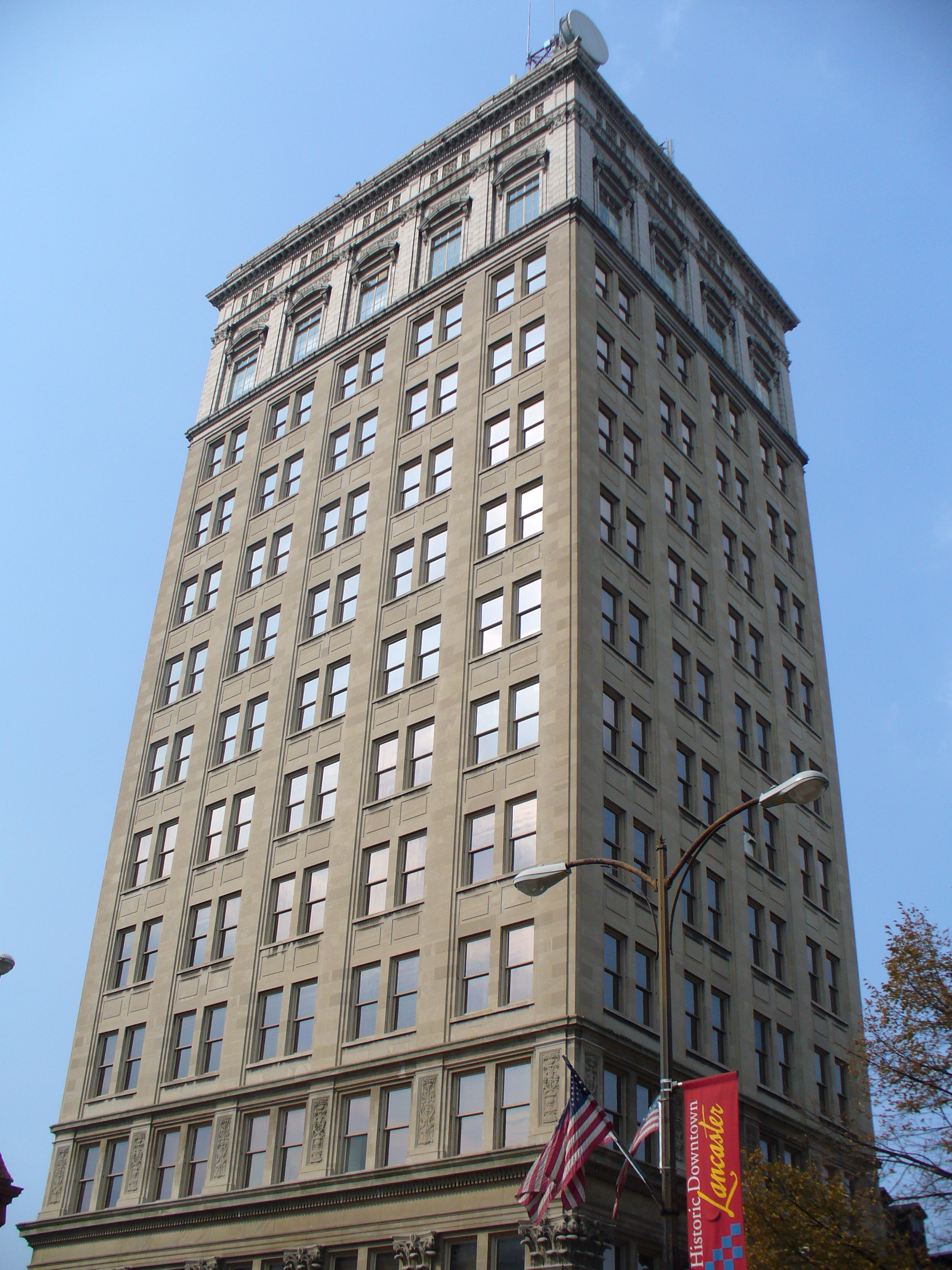
- W. W. Griest Building
- Interactive map of the W.W. Griest Building area

General information
- Location: 8 North Queen Street; Lancaster, Pennsylvania, United States
- Construction started: 1924
- Completed: 1925

Technical details
- Floor count: 14

Design and construction
- Architect: C. Emlen Urban
- W. W. Griest Building
- U.S. National Register of Historic Places
- Location within Pennsylvania Location within the United States
- Location: 8 N. Queen St., Lancaster, Pennsylvania
- Coordinates: 40°2′17″N 76°18′24″W
- Area: less than one acre
- Built: 1924–1925
- Architect: Urban, C. Emlen
- Architectural style: Italian Renaissance Revival
- NRHP reference No.: 99000755
- Added to NRHP: June 25, 1999

The W.W. Griest Building, also known as the Lancaster Federal Building and PP&L Building, is an historic skyscraper in the city of Lancaster, Pennsylvania, United States.

It has been listed on the U.S. National Register of Historic Places since June 25, 1999.

== History and architectural features ==
The W.W. Griest Building was named after William Walton Griest, a former Pennsylvania representative and head of Lancaster Public Utilities.

Designed by noted Lancaster architect C. Emlen Urban and built between 1924 and 1925, this historic structure was created in the Italian Renaissance Revival. A steel frame building that was faced in granite, limestone, and terra cotta, it is fourteen stories tall; each floor measures sixty-six feet by fifty-five feet, or 3,600 square feet. The twelfth floor, now office space, once housed a three hundred-seat auditorium with a green and gold frescoed ceiling. A -fifty-three-foot tall tower was added to the top of the building in 1976. The W.W. Griest Building is the second tallest building in the city of Lancaster.
