= Central Market (Lancaster) =

- U.S. National Register of Historic Places
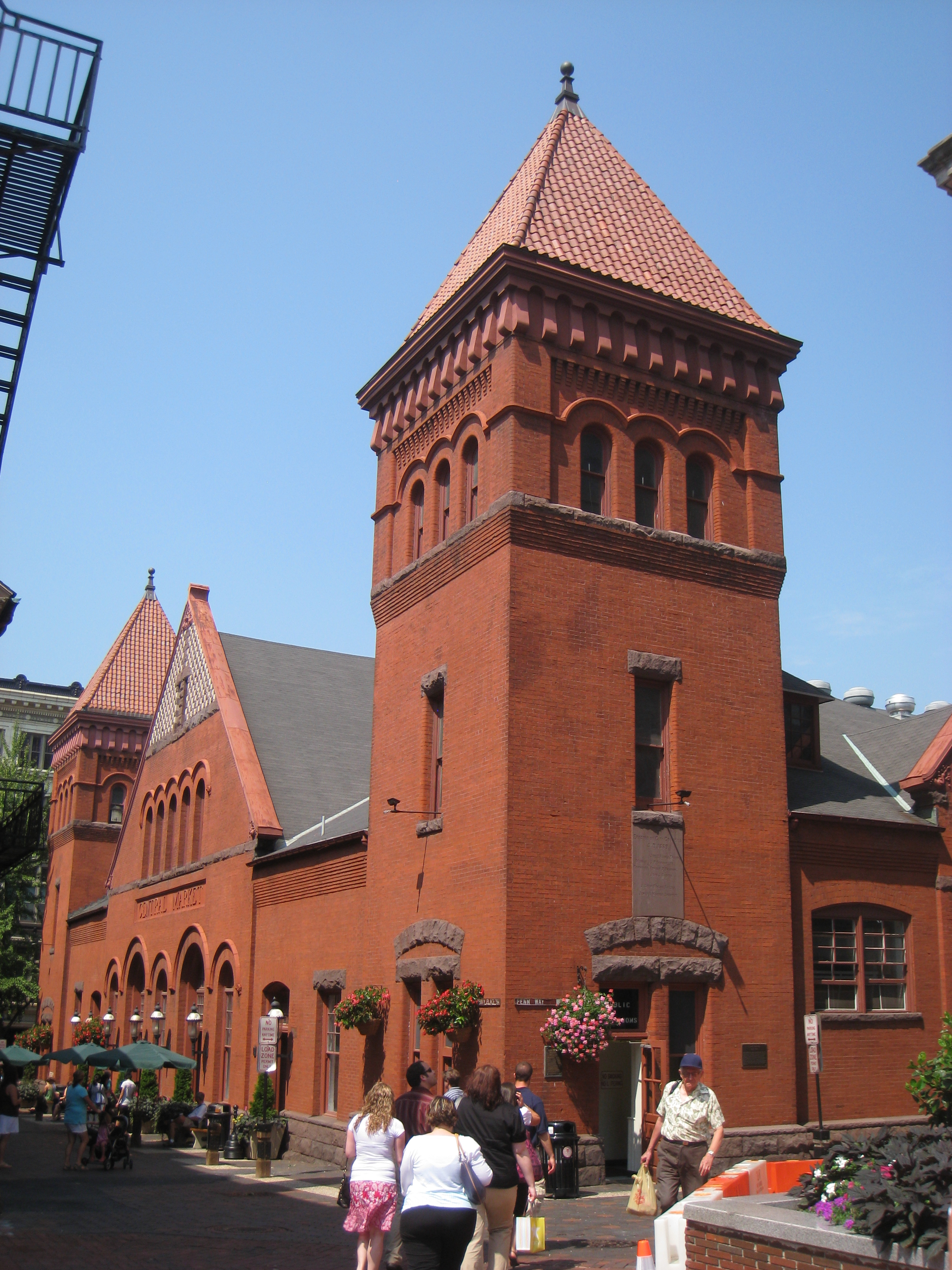
- Central Market in Lancaster, Pennsylvania Logo

- Location within Pennsylvania Location within the United States
- Location: William Henry Pl., Lancaster, Pennsylvania, U.S.
- Coordinates: 40°2′N 76°18′W
- Area: 2 acres (0.81 ha)
- Built: 1889
- Architect: Warner, James H.
- Architectural style: Romanesque
- NRHP reference No.: 72001127
- Added to NRHP: July 12, 1972

Central Market, also known as Lancaster Central Market, is a historic public market located in Penn Square, in downtown Lancaster, Pennsylvania. Until 2005, when it was transferred to a trust, the market was the oldest municipally-operated market in the United States.

The Central Market comprises approximately 60 vendors who principally sell foodstuffs – fresh fruits and produce, meats, cheeses, fish and seafood and baked goods – and flowers. Products for sale come from Amish, Pennsylvania Dutch, German, Greek, Caribbean, Middle Eastern, and Slavic origins.

== History ==
A public marketplace was deeded on this site in 1730 as part of the settlement of Lancaster. The marketplace was officially chartered by King George II on May 1, 1742, officially designating Lancaster as a market town. The Central Market occupies a portion of the original marketplace, with the first permanent building erected in 1757.

This 20,540 square-foot brick building sits adjacent to the old City Hall, Lancaster's very first skyscraper as well as many other historical buildings.

The current building was built in 1889, and is a brick building with a hipped and gabled terra cotta roof, in the Romanesque Revival style. Central Market was designed by English architect James H. Warner, who eventually made Lancaster his home. Its front facade features twin towers measuring 72 feet (22 metres) feet tall, with a gable between them. The interior structure has wooden pillars supporting the roof with a grid of steel rod Howe trusses.

The Central Market was listed on the National Register of Historic Places in 1972. The Central Market is owned and maintained by the City of Lancaster and has been since its development. In more recent years the Central Market Trust, which is a non-profit 501 (c)3 organization has managed it. The trust was formed in 2005 and consists of the Market Manager and eleven volunteers from the community.

== Offerings ==
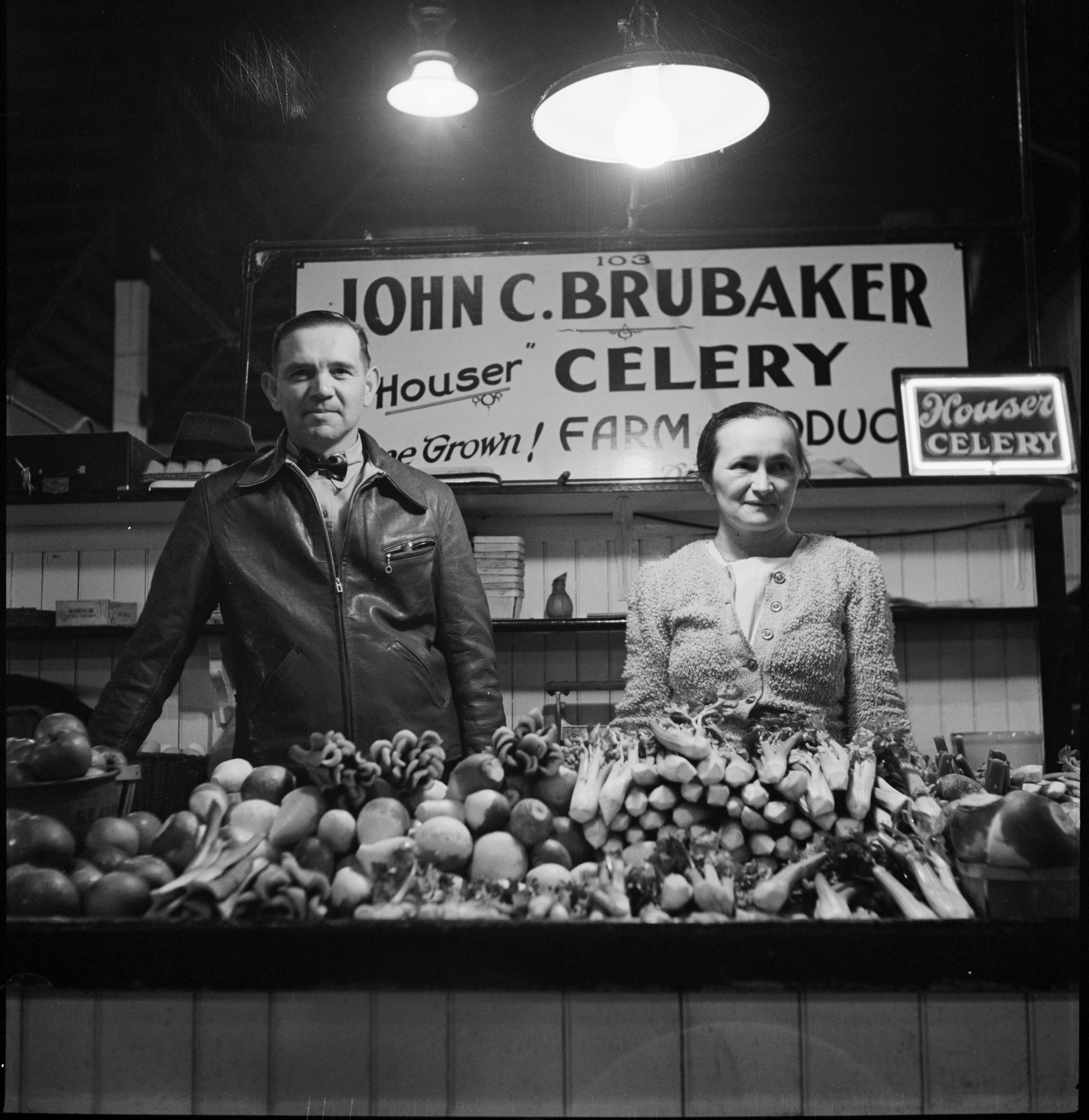
A woman and her husband at stall at the market in November 1942

Each week approximately 3,000 people visit the market, with 82 percent of these people living and/or working in Lancaster and an additional 33 percent of them living within the same zip code as the Central Market.

Vendors offer a wide variety of international and Amish cuisine foods. Vendors include Kauffman's Fruit Farm from Bird-in-Hand, Pennsylvania, Hodecker's bleached celery, cookies, Springerle House ornaments, hardwood smoked hams and bacon from S. Clyde Weaver, and sweets from Pennsylvania Fudge Company. For more than 100 years, the Stoner Family Vegetable stand has been selling their produce at the market, longer than any other vendor. Thomas Produce has been at the market for 80 years and over 60 years ago, Long's Horseradish stand joined the Central Market family.

== Renovations ==
After more than 40 years since its last major upgrade, the Central Market finally received a $7 million renovation. By 2011, the entire project was officially completed. The renovation eliminated large suspended lights, uncovered many pre-existing long windows, and re positioned the mechanical system underground.

== Awards and recognitions ==
The 2011 preservation plan (Lancaster Central Market: Assessments, Guidelines, and Recommendations for Preservation and Development) that guided the building renovation was nationally recognized, winning the American Planning Association's 2013 National Planning Excellence Award for Urban Design. The preservation plan was also awarded the Lancaster County Planning Commission's 2012 Leadership Achievement Award for Historic Resources. The building renovation won the Preservation Pennsylvania 2011 Award.

National Geographic recently named Central Market as one of their travel favorites. The Central Market was also named one of America's 10 greatest public places by the American Planning Association (APA), and was listed as one of the ten best fresh markets in the world (10 of the world’s best fresh markets) by CNN in 2013.

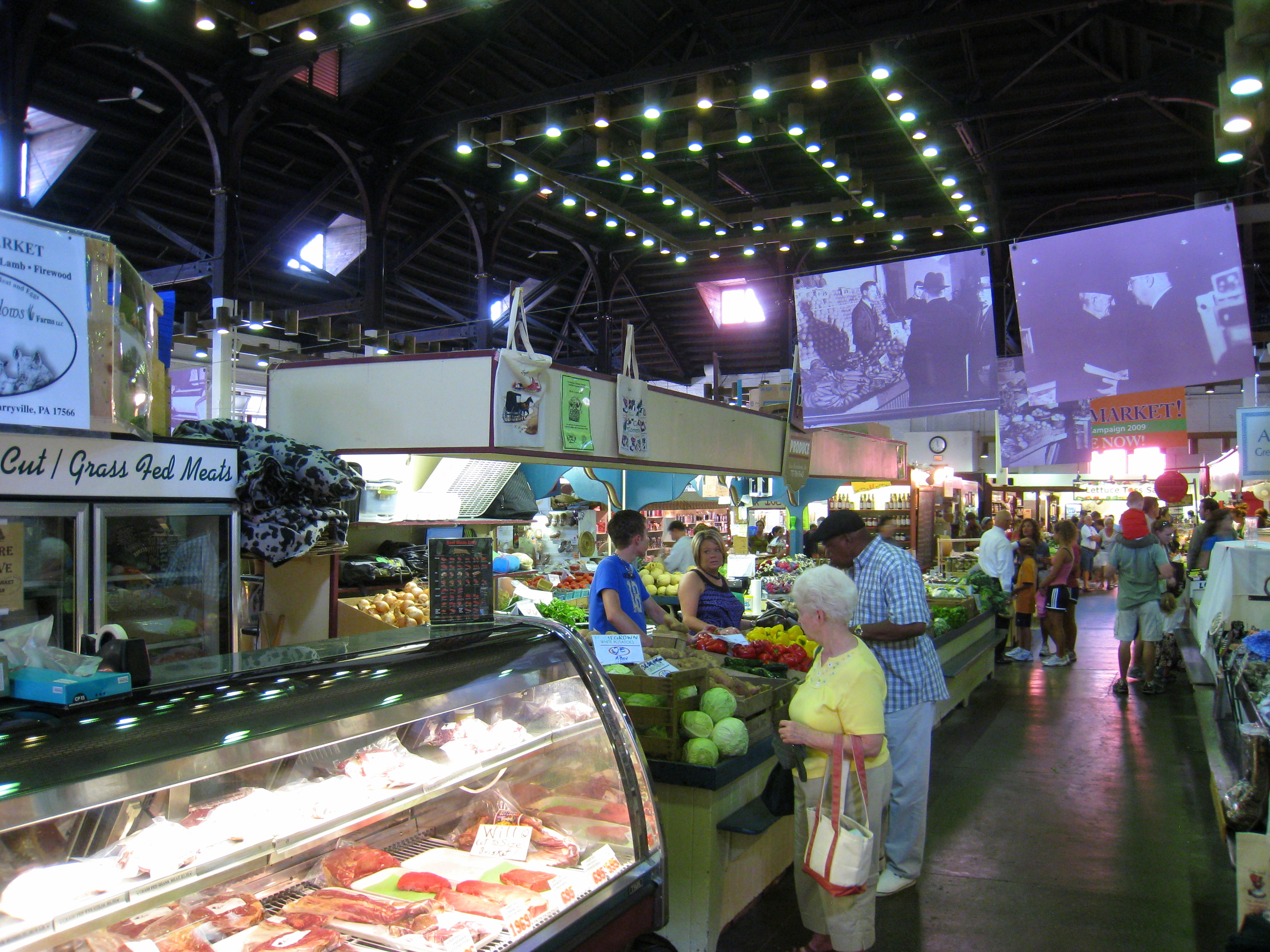
Interior view

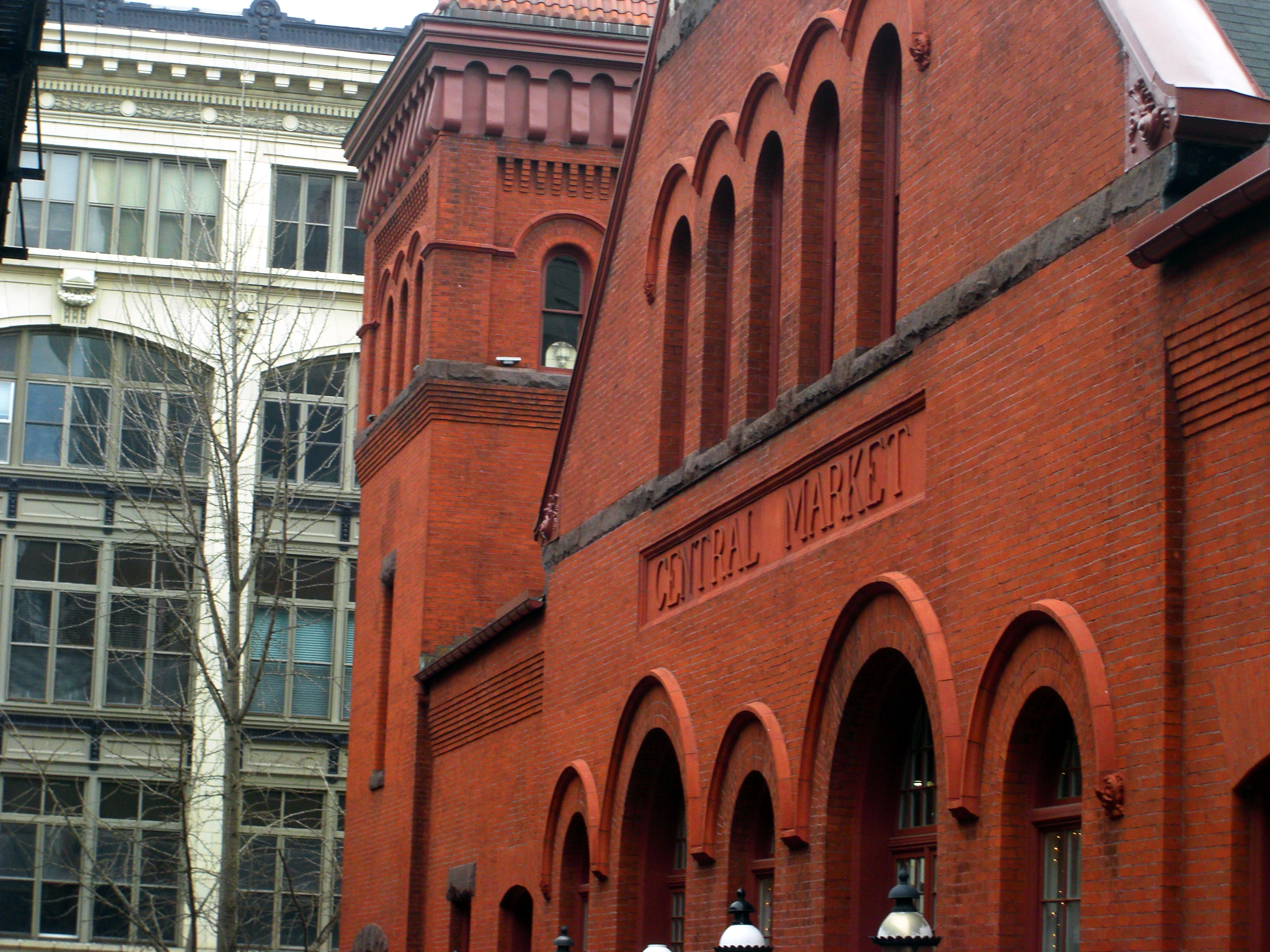
Exterior view
