= Bustleton =

Bustleton may refer to:

- Bustleton, New Jersey, United States
- Bustleton, Philadelphia, Pennsylvania, United States
