= Lancaster Historic District (Lancaster, Pennsylvania) =

Historic district in Pennsylvania, United States

- U.S. National Register of Historic Places
- U.S. Historic district
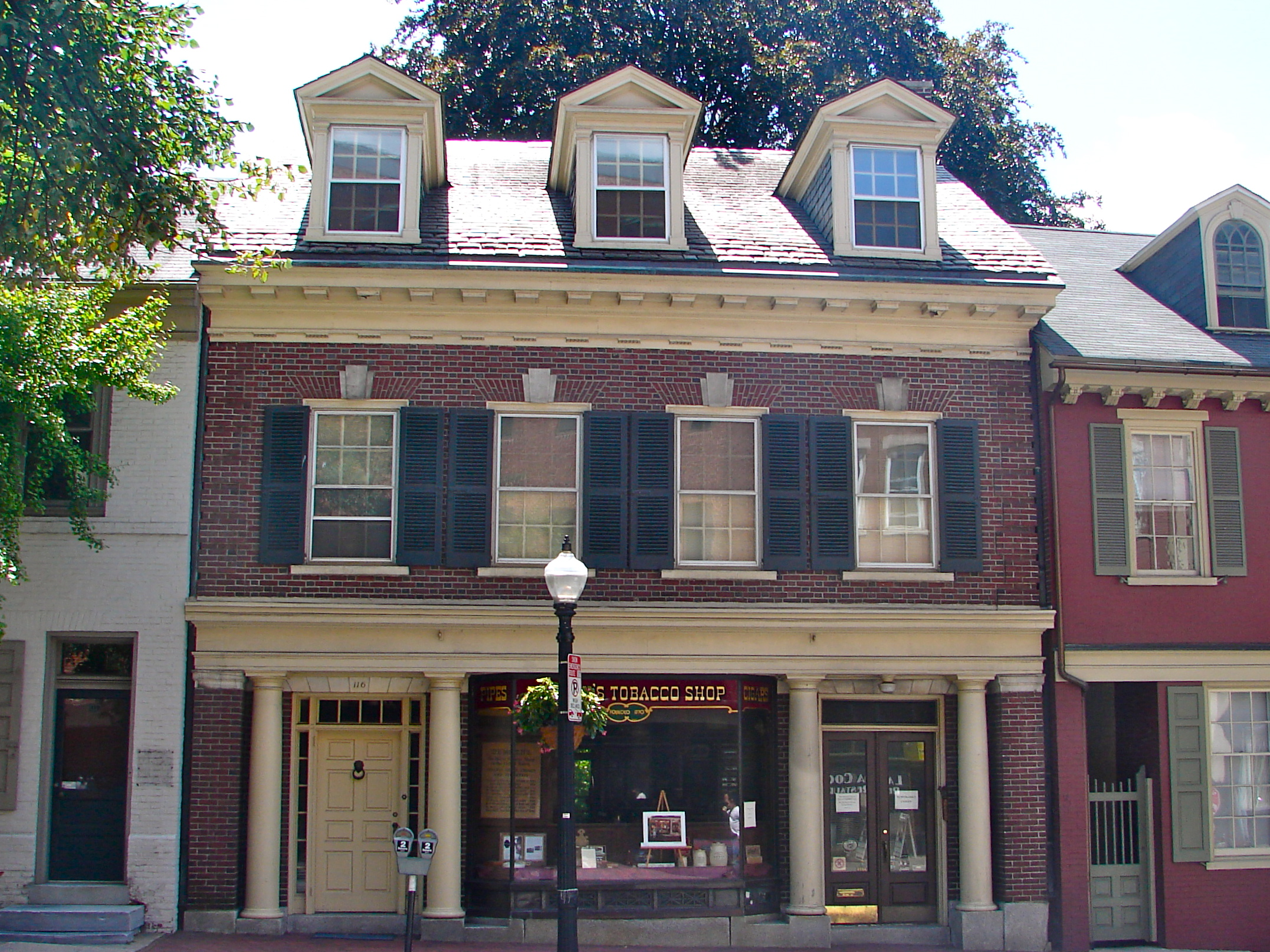
- Demuth's Tobacco Shop, August 2011

- Location within Pennsylvania Location within the United States
- Location: Roughly bounded by Howard Avenue, Queen, Church, Duke, Chestnut and Plum Streets, Lancaster, Pennsylvania
- Coordinates: 40°02′10″N 76°18′10″W
- Area: 82.2 acres (33.3 ha)
- Architect: Sloan, Samuel; Et al.
- Architectural style: Georgian, Italianate, Late Victorian
- NRHP reference No.: 79002256; 83004219 (Boundary Increase I); 84003435 (Boundary Increase II)
- Added to NRHP: November 15, 1979; November 10, 1983 (Boundary Increase I); June 21, 1984 (Boundary Increase II)

The Lancaster Historic District, also known as Old Town Lancaster, is a national historic district that is located in Lancaster, Lancaster County, Pennsylvania.

It was listed on the National Register of Historic Places in 1979, with boundary increases in 1983 and 1984.

== History and architectural features ==
This historic district includes 578 contributing buildings that are located in a predominantly residential area of Lancaster, with buildings mostly dating to between about 1840 and 1910. The district also includes a few buildings dating to the eighteenth century.

Residential buildings include two- and three-story Victorian brick rowhouses. Notable non-residential buildings include the Demuth's Tobacco Shop, St. James Episcopal Church, and the Unitarian Universalist Church of Lancaster.

Also located in the district is the separately listed Lancaster County Courthouse designed by noted Philadelphia architect Samuel Sloan (1815–1884).
