= Broughton Hospital =

Hospital and historic district in North Carolina, US

- North Carolina Department of Health and Human Services
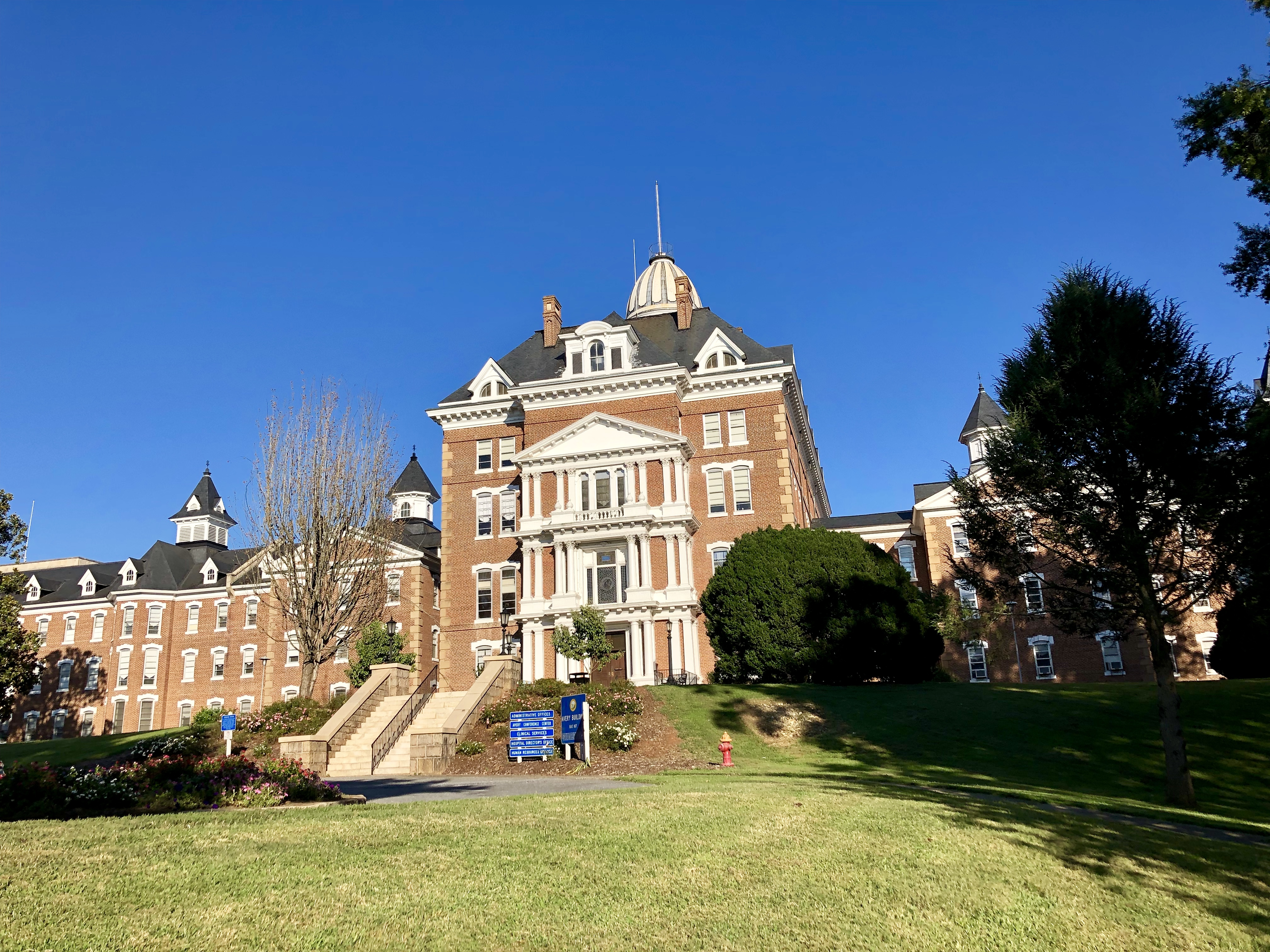
- Broughton Hospital: Avery Building

Geography
- Location: Morganton, North Carolina, United States
- Coordinates: 35.731316°N 81.6729°W

Organization
- Type: Specialist

Services
- Standards: Centers of Medicare and Medicaid Management Services (CMS)
- Beds: 278
- Speciality: Psychiatric

History
- Founded: March 29, 1883

Links
- Website: www.ncdhhs.gov/divisions/dsohf/broughton-hospital
- Lists: Hospitals in North Carolina
- Other links
- Western North Carolina Insane Asylum
- U.S. National Register of Historic Places
- Location within North Carolina Location within the United States
- Location: Off NC 18, Morganton, North Carolina
- Area: 9 acres (3.6 ha)
- Built: 1877
- Architect: Sloan, Samuel
- MPS: Morganton MRA (AD)
- NRHP reference No.: 77000996
- Added to NRHP: October 5, 1977
- Broughton Hospital Historic District
- U.S. National Register of Historic Places
- U.S. Historic district
- Location within North Carolina Location within the United States
- Location: Roughly bounded by Broughton Hospital campus, NC 18, Bickett St., & Enola Rd., Morganton, North Carolina
- Area: 337 acres (136 ha)
- Built: 1878
- Architect: Sloan, Samuel; Et al.
- Architectural style: Colonial Revival, Art Deco
- MPS: Morganton MRA
- NRHP reference No.: 87001918
- Added to NRHP: November 9, 1987

Broughton Hospital is a psychiatric hospital located in Morganton, North Carolina. It is administered by North Carolina Department of Health and Human Services Division of Mental Health, Developmental Disabilities and Substance Abuse Services.

== History ==
In 1850, influential mental health activist Dorothea Dix petitioned the North Carolina General Assembly to support and build a psychiatric hospital to treat the mentally ill. Within 25 years the General Assembly determined that one hospital was insufficient to care for the population of people afflicted with mental illness. In 1875, the State provided $75,000 for the establishment of a second psychiatric hospital. Built in Morganton on 283 acres (115 ha) of land, Western Carolina Insane Asylum, opened on March 29, 1883. The asylum admitted physician Dr. Red Pepper as its first patient. By 1884 its first director, Dr. Patrick Livingston Murphy, reported to the General Assembly that more space was needed. In 1885 and 1886 two new wings were opened, expanding the hospital's bed space to over 500 mentally ill patients.

In 1890 the hospital's name was changed to State Hospital at Morganton, a name it kept until 1959. Patients were used to construct roads on the property, and establish and maintain the gardens and grounds. By 1893 the hospital's holdings would encompass over 300 acres (120 ha). During the early 1900s the hospital expanded greatly. Using the colony system, a farm area was established with a dairy, vineyard and greenhouses, all staffed by patients of varying degrees of functionality. The hospital was nearly self-sufficient. Additional expansions and land holdings would take place until just after World War I when public attitudes about patients with mental illness changed dramatically. The hospital, like many others of this time period, was neglected and suffered during the state and national financial problems of the Great Depression.

During the 1920s, the patient-to-physician ratio was 300-to-1; by the 1930s this was almost 500-to-1. Hours for attendants and nurses were intensive, and time off was sparse. Attendants usually slept in the same wards with patients until further expansion during the 1940s. By that time, the hospital's census topped 3,500 patients. In 1959, State Hospital at Morganton became Broughton Hospital, named after World War II Governor J. Melville Broughton.

The 1960s brought many changes to Broughton: educational programs were established, religious services were incorporated, and the hospital continued to expand (including through affiliated local community health centers). This was part of an effort to de-institutionalize individuals with mental illness and treat more in local settings. During the 1970s Broughton underwent changes in its housing procedures. Up to that time, its population had been drawn geographically, meaning patients were being housed according to where they were from, rather than by age or disability. On March 28, 1973, Broughton Hospital received its first survey by the Joint Commission on Accreditation of Healthcare Organizations (JCAHO), and the hospital received a one-year accreditation.

The Broughton Hospital Main Building was designed by architect Samuel Sloan and built in 1877. It was listed on the National Register of Historic Places in 1977 as the Western North Carolina Insane Asylum. The Broughton Hospital Historic District was listed on the National Register of Historic Places in 1987 and encompasses 60 contributing buildings and one contributing site.

The period from the 1980s through 1990s was especially difficult for Broughton. Facing increased costs and increased oversight from various organizations, Broughton encountered severe budget problems. In December 1992, the Broughton Hospital Foundation was formed. Its goal was to enhance the lives of the patients at Broughton Hospital through donations, endowments, activities, etc.

Today Broughton serves approximately 800 patients per year and employs approximately 1200 staff members, with a $98 million annual operating budget. In 2011, Broughton began hiring temporary and contract staff to help control overhead costs. Broughton completed a new facility in 2017 that houses the hospital departments and patient divisions under one roof, on the existing grounds. The main building is now preserved as a historical landmark that is used as office space.

== Asylum Cemetery ==
"The cemetery on the grounds was opened in the Spring of 1883 and was by 1884 enclosed by a simple fence. It now contains the remains of 1583 people including several infants born at the asylum to women in care there. Every grave is marked, every person buried there known, something not all asylums can claim.

The asylum's first Superintendent, Patrick Livingston Murphy, M.D. refused to allow any patient's remains to be given over to the North Carolina Anatomical Board for dissection and disposal during his tenure from 1883 to 1907 saying that if a patient's family could not provide for burial the asylum would.

There were times that weather precluded transport of a person's remains home and burial took place in the asylum cemetery. Other patients had been in care at the asylum so long they had no one left back home to claim their remains or they considered the asylum their home.

For some the cost of transporting remains home by train or wagon may have been prohibitive, the asylum's catchment area being the entire western end of North Carolina, reaching high into the mountains and to the borders of Virginia, Tennessee and South Carolina. It was not often, as many choose to assume, a matter of abandonment, that led people to be buried in an asylum cemetery but expediency, the wishes of the patient and his/her family and the graces and attentions of the asylum staff who in many instances had known and cared for that person for many years." (Presentation at Broughton Hospital on cemetery research, Suzannah K McCuen, MD)
