= Rosedale (Columbus, Mississippi) =

Historic house in Mississippi, United States

- U.S. National Register of Historic Places
- Location within Mississippi Location within the United States
- Location: 1523 Ninth St. S., Columbus, Mississippi
- Coordinates: 33°28′49″N 88°25′15″W
- Area: 11.1 acres (4.5 ha)
- Built: 1855
- Architectural style: Italianate
- NRHP reference No.: 94000642
- Added to NRHP: June 24, 1994

Rosedale is a historic Italianate style house that was built in 1855, near Columbus, Mississippi.

It was built according to designs of architect Samuel Sloan, perhaps from a pattern-book. The interior restoration was designed by Volz O'Connell Hutson of Austin, Texas.

It was listed on the U.S. National Register of Historic Places in 1994.
