= Downtown Baptist Church =

Historic church in South Carolina, United States

- U.S. National Register of Historic Places
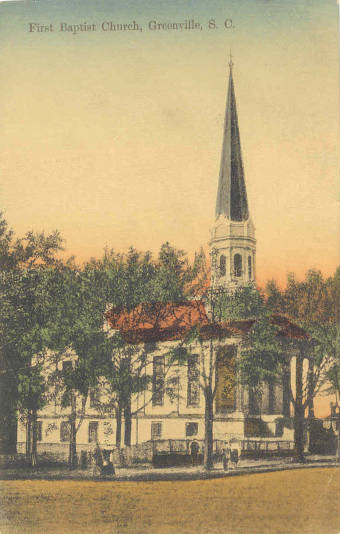

- Location within South Carolina Location within the United States
- Location: 101 W. McBee Ave., Greenville, South Carolina
- Coordinates: 34°51′9″N 82°24′9″W
- Area: 1.4 acres (0.57 ha)
- Built: 1858
- Architect: Sloan, Samuel
- Architectural style: Greek Revival
- NRHP reference No.: 77001225
- Added to NRHP: August 16, 1977

Downtown Baptist Church is a historic church building located at 101 W. McBee Avenue in Greenville, South Carolina.

It was constructed in 1858 as the new home of First Baptist Church of Greenville, replacing an earlier structure on the banks of the Reedy River. In the late 1970s, First Baptist Church moved to a new campus on Cleveland Street. Most of the congregation relocated, but a minority chose to stay at the downtown site and founded a new church called Downtown Baptist Church.

The building was designed in Greek Revival style by architect Samuel Sloan. The building was added to the National Register of Historic Places in 1977.

In 2011, the building was renovated, removing side galleries and balconies that were added in 1915. It is now the home of Grace Church.
