= Church Hill North Historic District =

Historic district in Virginia, United States

- U.S. National Register of Historic Places
- U.S. Historic district
- Virginia Landmarks Register
- Richmond City Historic District
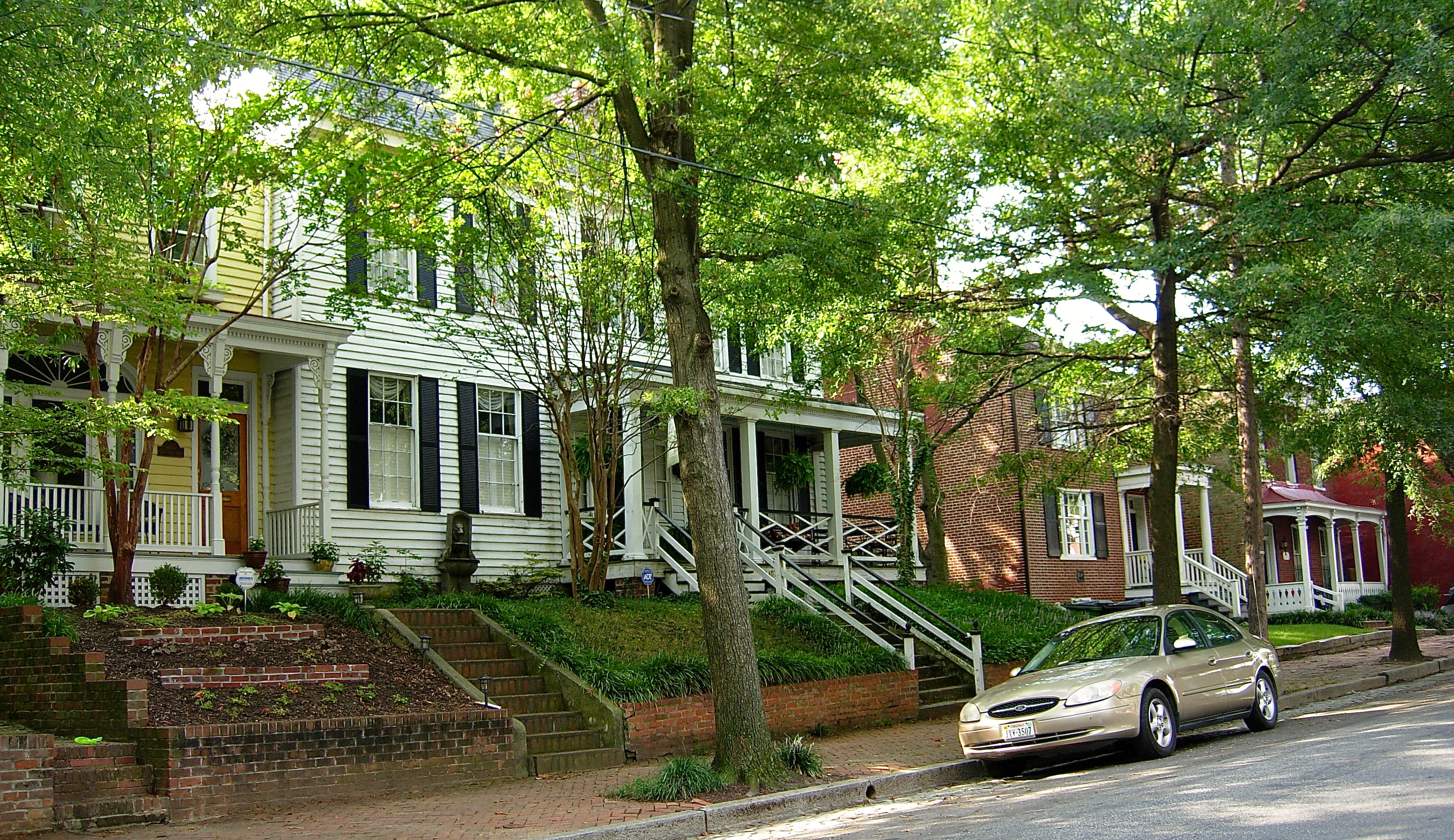

- Location within Virginia Location within the United States
- Location: Along Marshall, Clay Leigh and M. Sts., bounded by 21st and 30th Sts., Richmond, Virginia (original); Roughly bounded by 25th St., T St., 32nd St. and M St., Richmond, Virginia (increase)
- Coordinates: 37.53317°N 77.4145°W
- Area: 70 acres (28 ha) (original); 37 acres (15 ha) (increase)
- Built: 1796
- Architect: Sloan, Samuel; Snyder, Asa (original); Herbert Levi Cain, T. Wiley Davis (increase)
- Architectural style: Early Republic, Late Victorian, Late 19th and 20th Century Revivals (original); Greek Revival, Italianate, et al. (increase)
- NRHP reference No.: 97000958 and 00000887
- VLR No.: 127-0820

Significant dates
- Added to NRHP: September 5, 1997; August 16, 2000
- Designated VLR: September 18, 1996

The Church Hill North Historic District is a historic district in Richmond, Virginia, that was listed on the National Register of Historic Places in 1997. An expansion of the district was listed in 2000. This added 37 acres (15 ha) to the original 70 acres (28 ha)

The original listing included 587 contributing buildings; 265 more were added in the expansion. The original included the 1854 Leigh Street Baptist Church by architects Samuel Sloan with cast iron stairs by Asa Snyder and the 1938 Art Deco style East End Theater by Henry Carl Messerschmidt (1891–1994). Venable Street Baptist Church built by T. Wiley Davis in the 1880s was part of the added area. The added area also included the Venable Street Baptist Church built in 1891, designed by M. J. Dimmock, the Dean of Richmond Architecture and built by D. Wiley Davis and a hip-roofed Sunday school church addition to East End Baptist Church added by Herbert Levi Cain in 1919.

== Gallery ==
Church Hill North Contributing Buildings

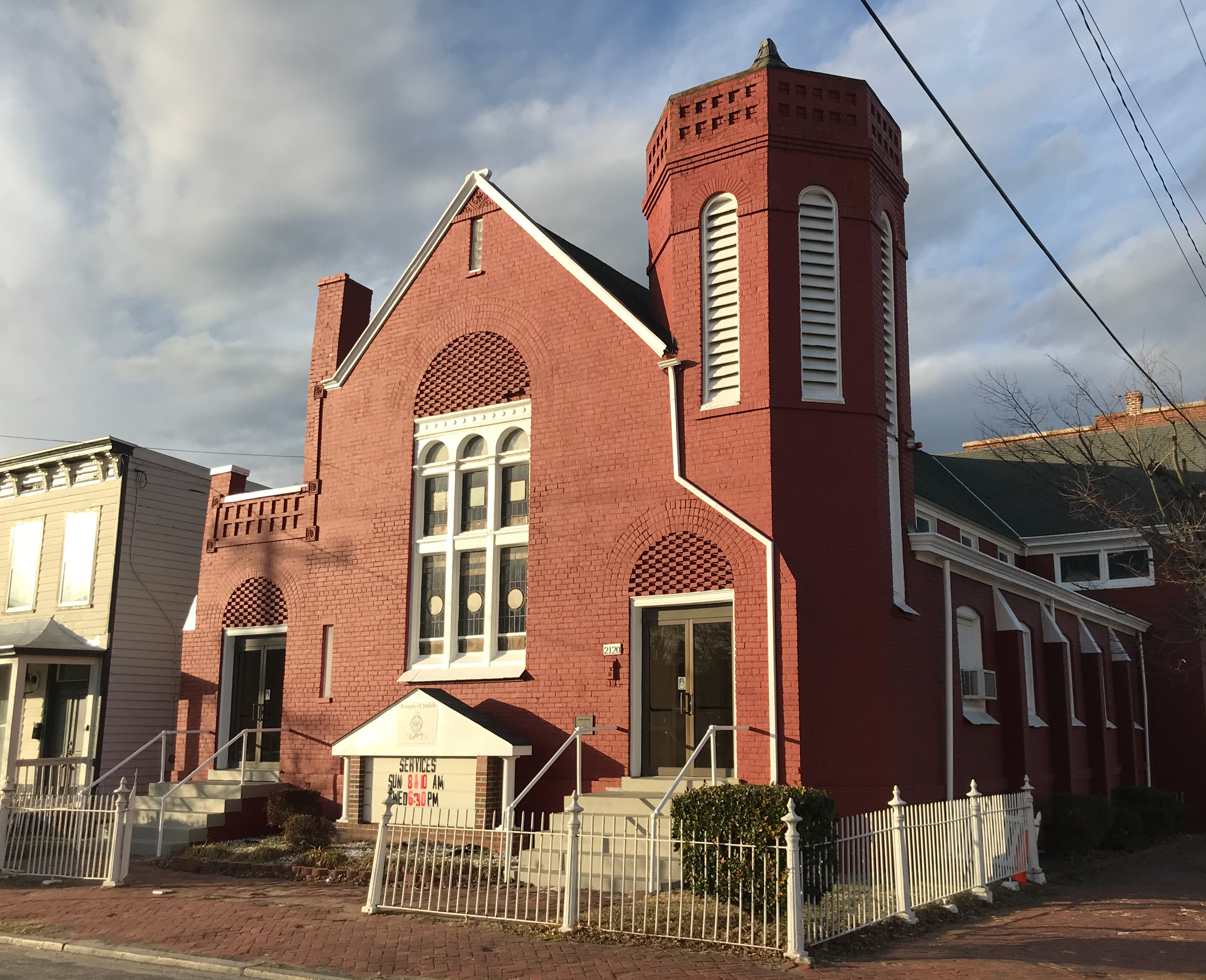
Venable Street Baptist Church - 1891. The church was designed by M. J. Dimmock and built by D. Wiley Davis.

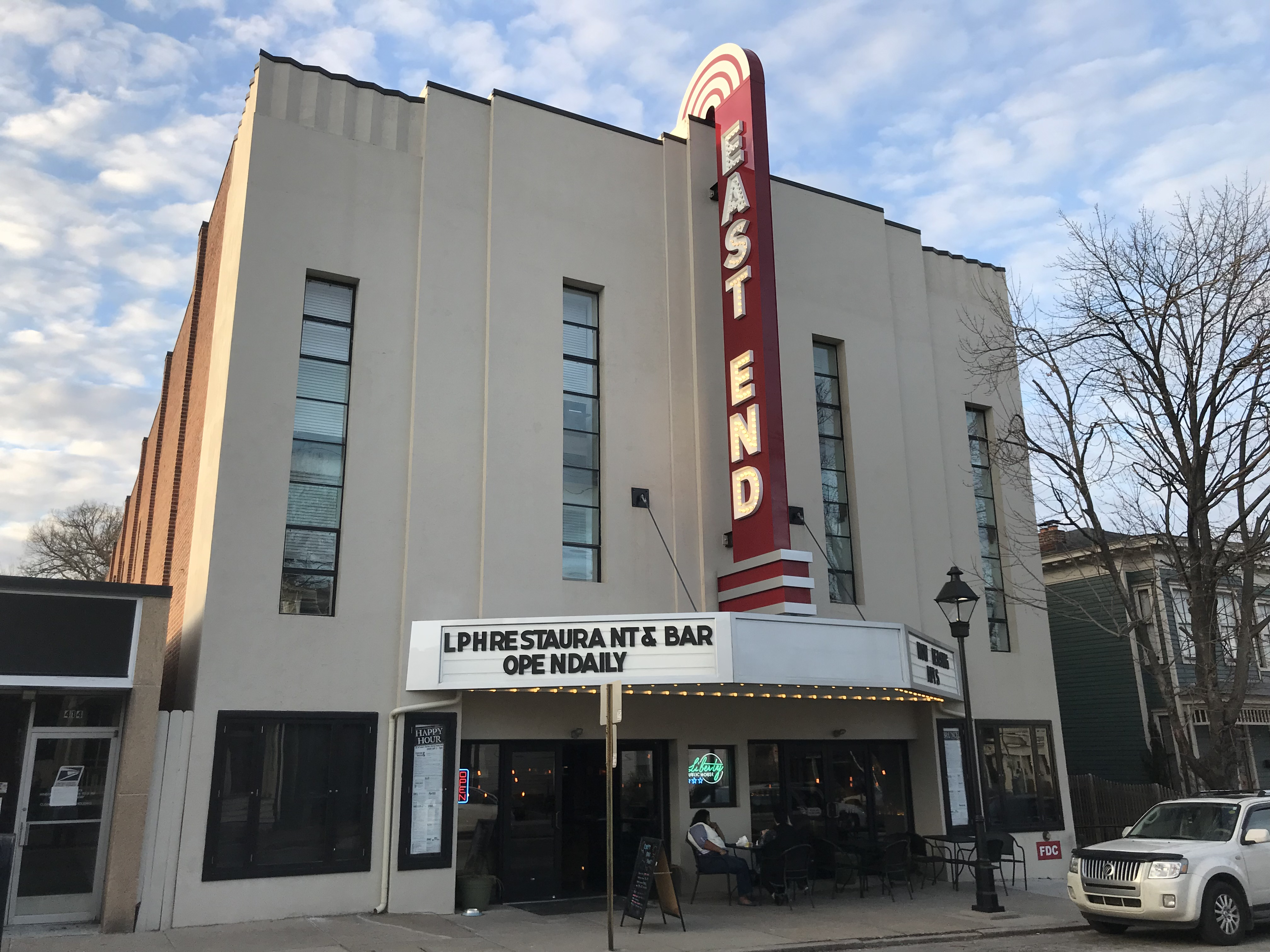
1938 Art Deco-style East End Theater at 418 North 25th Street, designed by Henry Carl Messerschmidt (1891–1994).

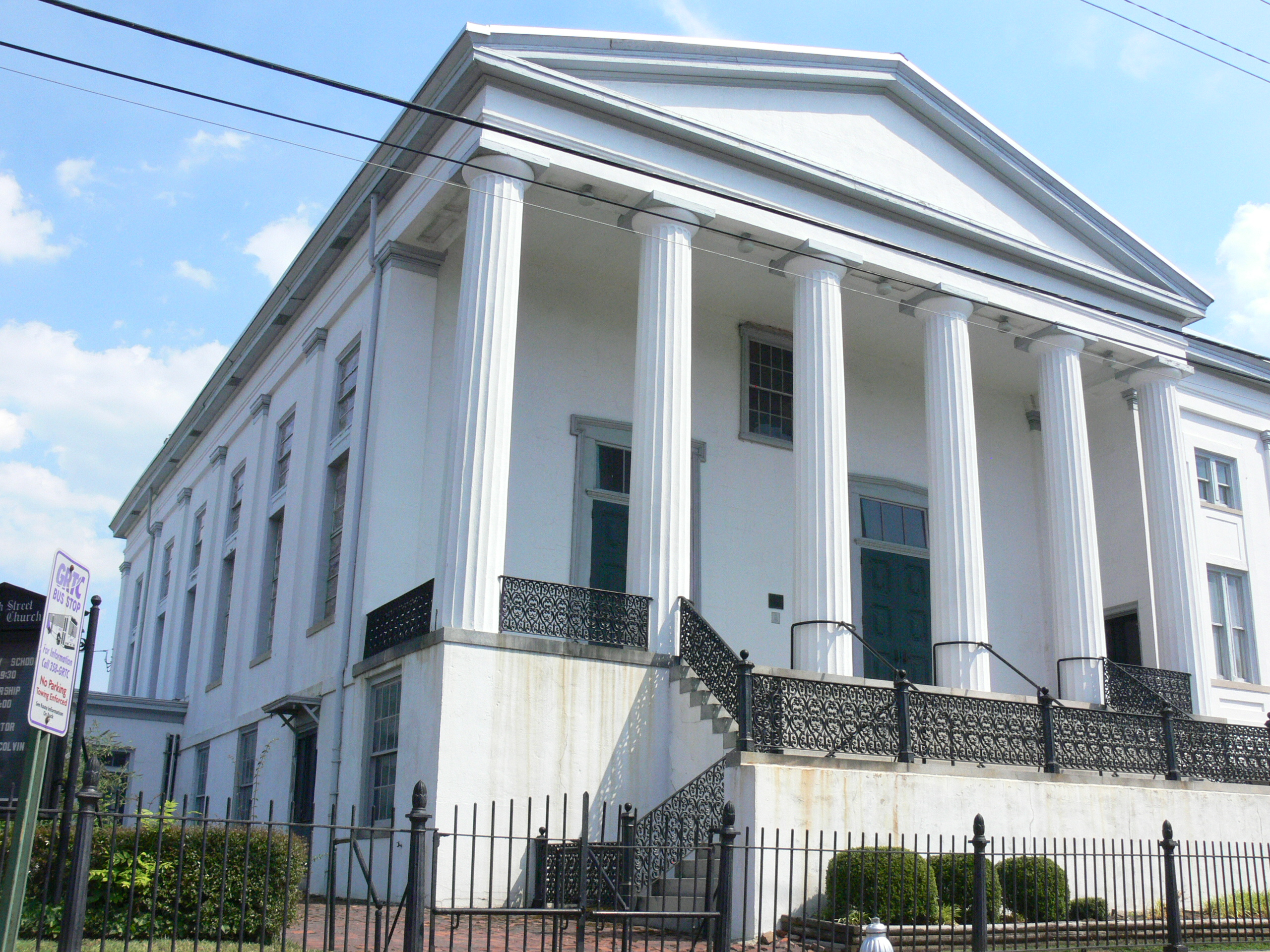
Leigh Street Baptist Church designed by architect Samuel Sloan and built between 1854 and 1857.

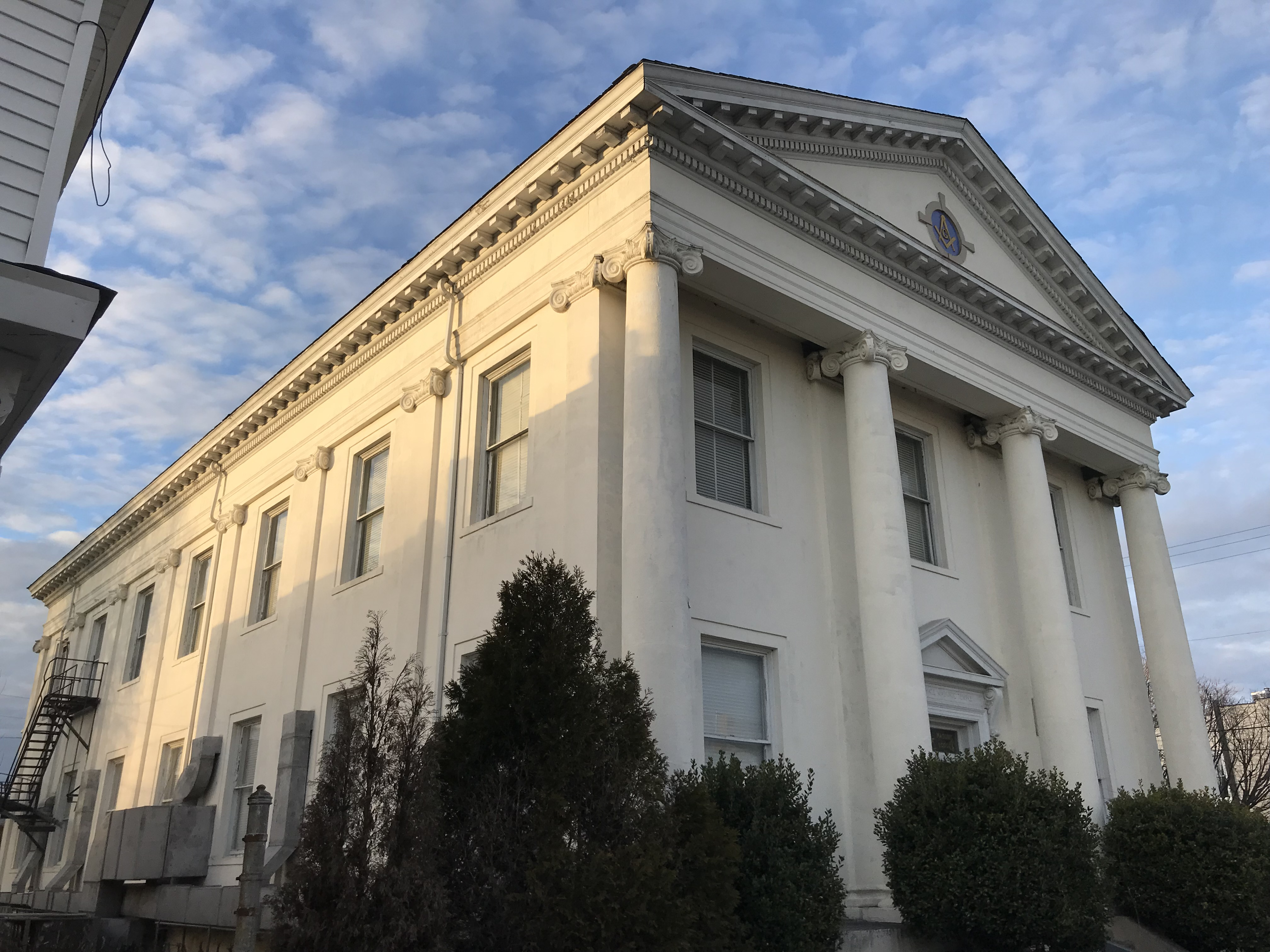
Prince Hall Masonic Lodge - Masonic Temple of Prince Hall Freemasonry that still serves the function for which it was originally built. 1927 brick and stucco Classical Revival building.

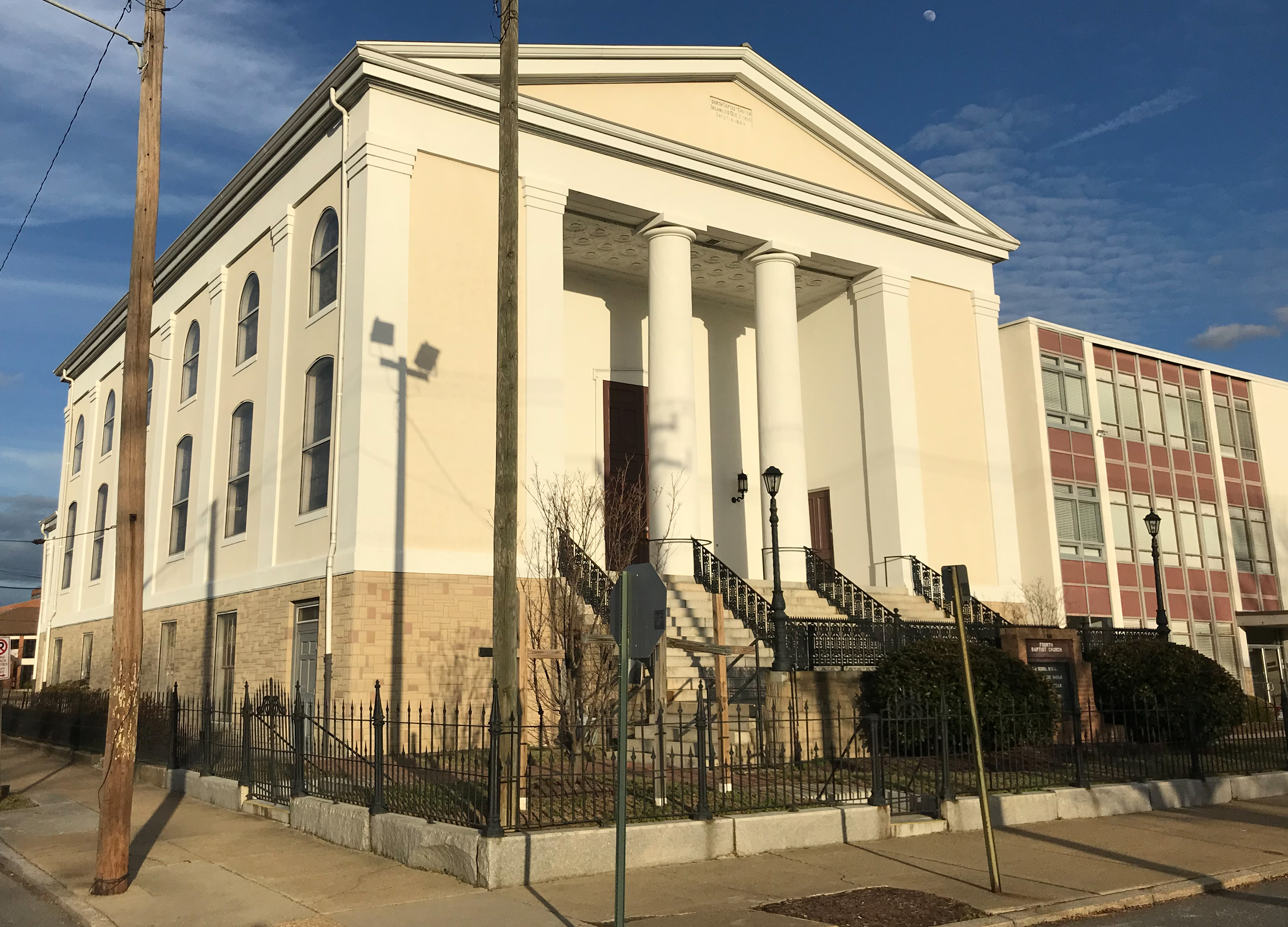
Fourth Baptist Church built by T Wiley Davis in 1884.

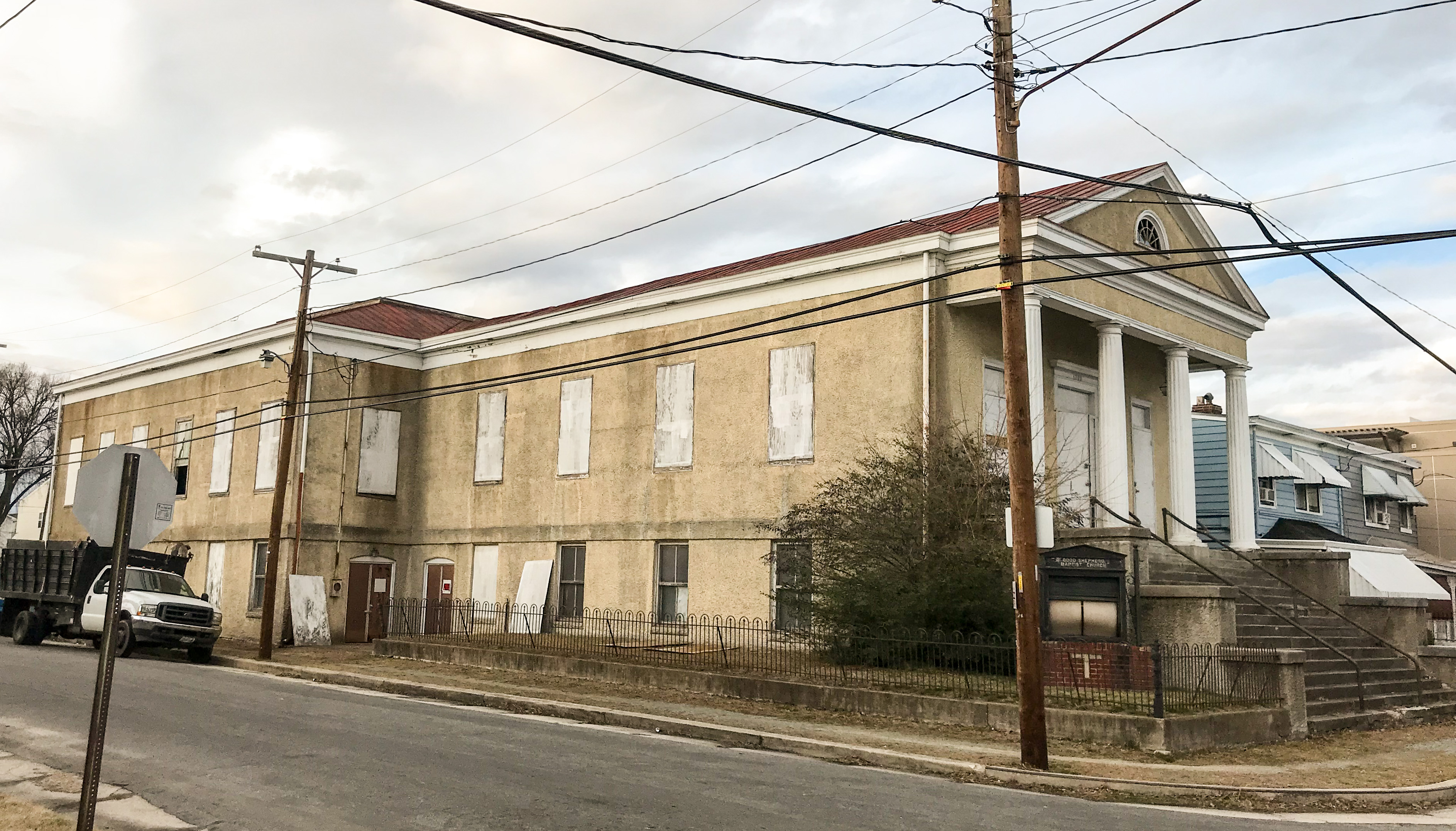
East End Baptist Church - the hip roofed Sunday School building was designed by Herbert Levi Cain.
