= Sylvan Building =

- U.S. National Register of Historic Places
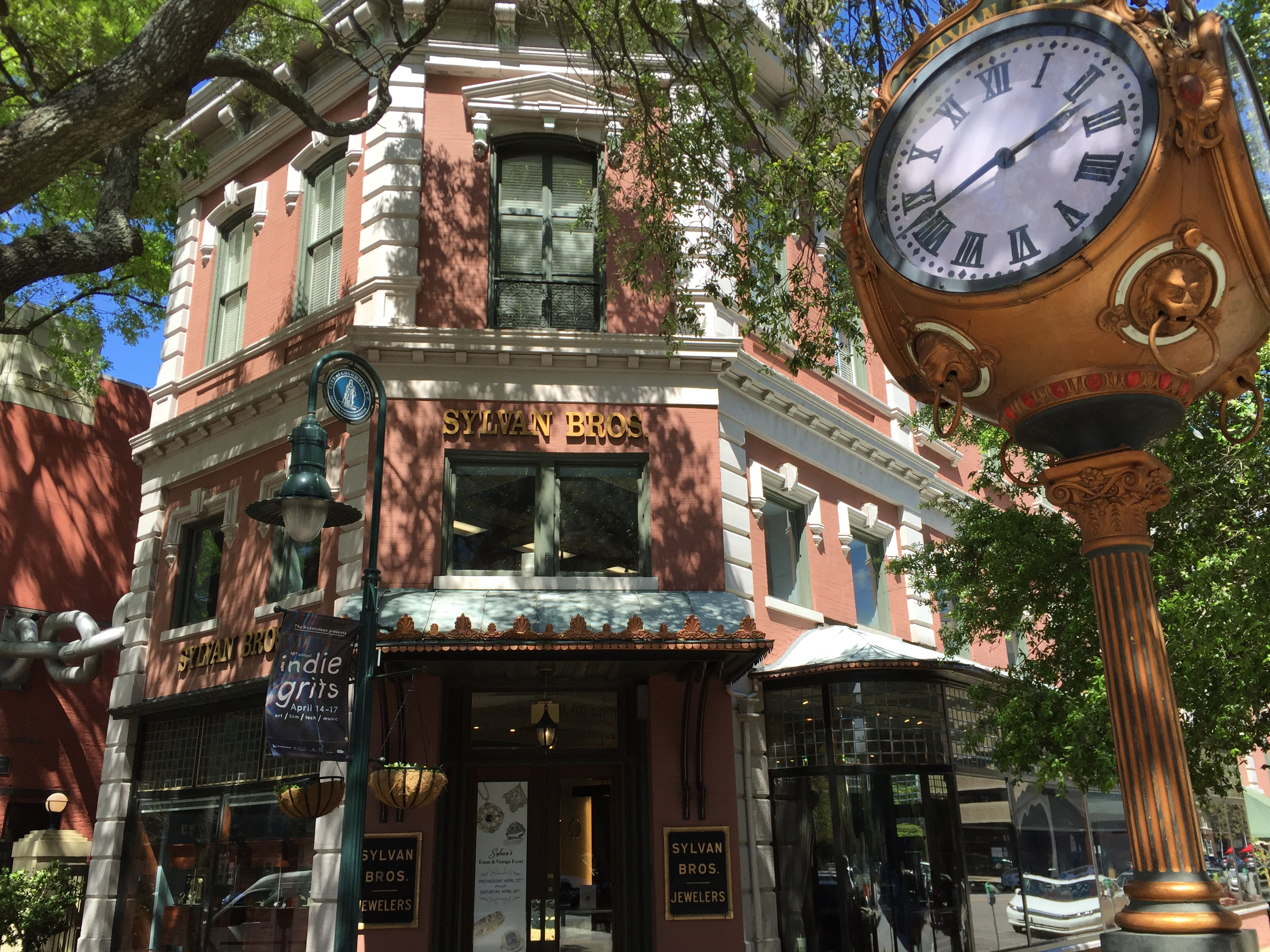

- Location within South Carolina Location within the United States
- Location: 1500 Main St., Columbia, South Carolina
- Coordinates: 34°0′18″N 81°2′7″W
- Area: 0.2 acres (0.081 ha)
- Built: 1870
- Architect: Sloan, Samuel
- Architectural style: Second Empire
- NRHP reference No.: 72001221
- Added to NRHP: March 23, 1972

Sylvan Building, originally known as Central National Bank, is a historic commercial building located at Columbia, South Carolina. It was built in 1870, and is a three-story, brick Second Empire style building designed by Samuel Sloan. It features a slate-covered mansard roof.

It was added to the National Register of Historic Places in 1972.
