= Lancaster County Courthouse (Pennsylvania) =

- U.S. National Register of Historic Places
- U.S. Historic district – Contributing property
- Pennsylvania state historical marker
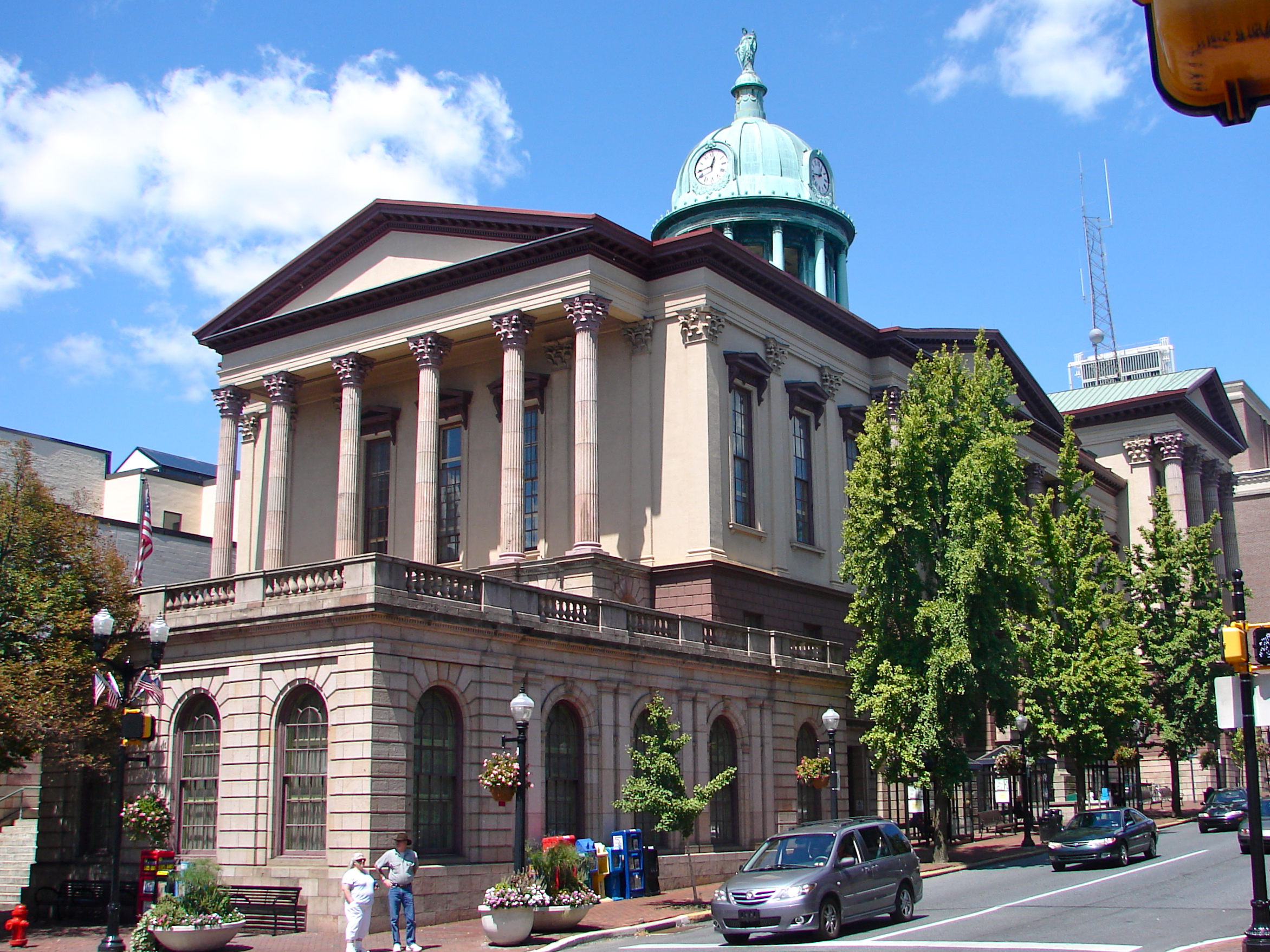
- Lancaster County Courthouse, August 2011

- Location within Pennsylvania Location within the United States
- Interactive map showing the location of Lancaster County Courthouse
- Location: 50 N. Duke St., Lancaster, Pennsylvania
- Coordinates: 40°2′18″N 76°18′15″W
- Area: 0.6 acres (0.24 ha)
- Built: 1852–1855, 1896–1898, 1926–1927
- Architect: Sloan, Samuel; Warner, James H.; Urban, C. Emlen
- Architectural style: Romanesque
- NRHP reference No.: 78002415

Significant dates
- Added to NRHP: November 7, 1978
- Designated PHMC: June 11, 1951

The Lancaster County Courthouse is an historic courthouse building that is located in Lancaster, Lancaster County, Pennsylvania, United States.

It was added to the National Register of Historic Places in 1978, and is a contributing property to the Lancaster Historic District.

== History and architectural features ==
The original building was built between 1852 and 1855 and was designed by Philadelphia architect Samuel Sloan (1815–1884). The north wing was added between 1896 and 1898; the low flanking wings on either side of the exterior staircase were added between 1926 and 1927. These later additions were designed by Lancaster architects James H. Warner and C. Emlen Urban, respectively. It is an important example of the Romanesque Revival style.

== See also ==
- List of state and county courthouses in Pennsylvania
