= Pennepack Baptist Church =

Church in Philadelphia, PA, USA

Coordinates: 40.08127°N 75.05120°W

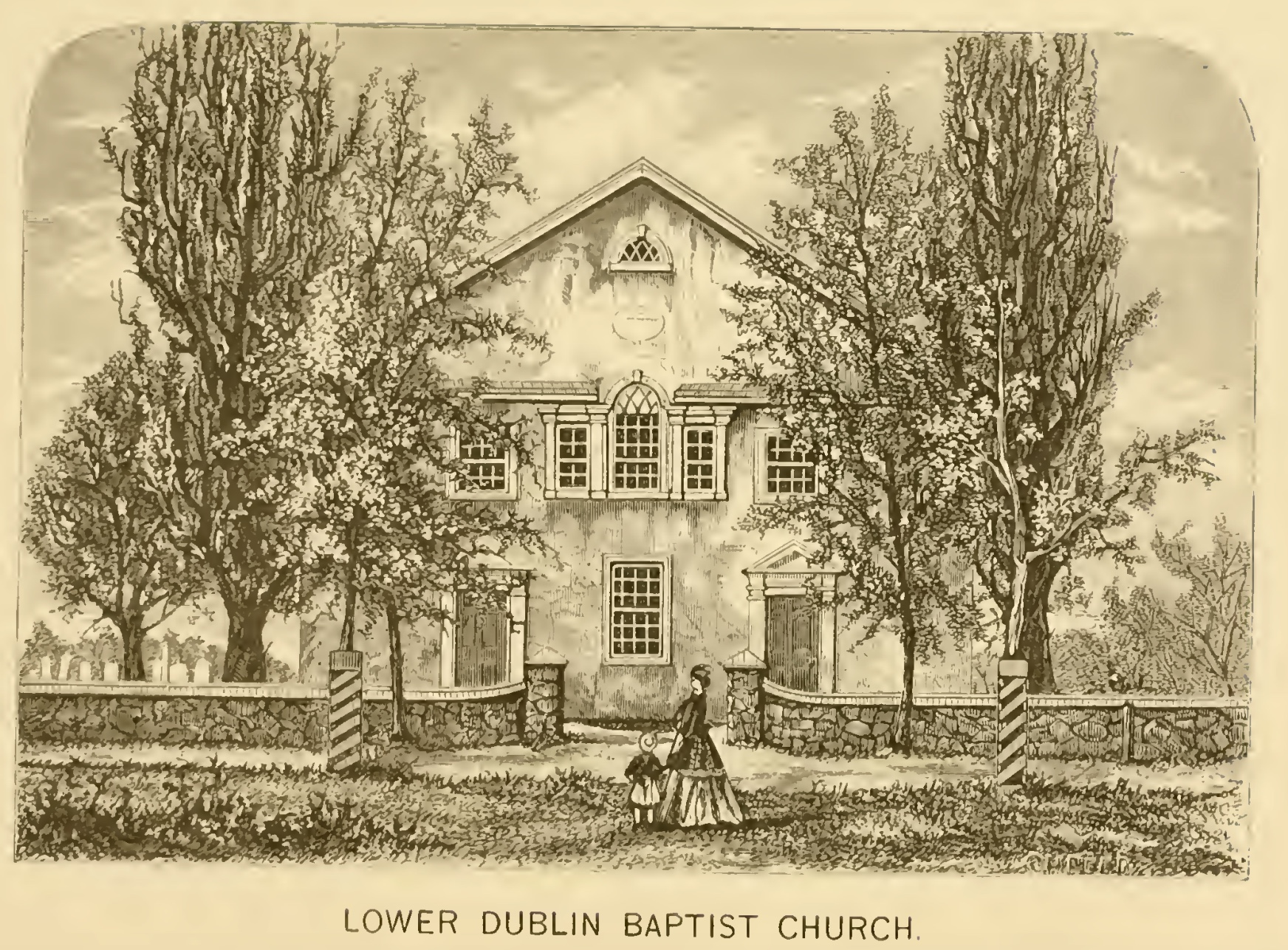
As drawn c. 1869

Pennepack Baptist Church, also known as the Pennepek Baptist Church and the Lower Dublin Baptist Church, is an historic Baptist church in Bustleton, Philadelphia, Pennsylvania, USA.

It is one of the oldest Baptist congregations in North America, and is situated in the 23rd Ward of Philadelphia, near Pennypack Creek (also known as the Pennepek).

== History and architectural features ==
The congregation of this church was founded in 1688 by Elias Keach, the son of Benjamin Keach, as the first Baptist church in Pennsylvania, and originally was based on Calvinist (Reformed) theology. Ebenezer Kinnersley, a notable scientist, served as minister for a period during the 1700s. The current church building was constructed in 1805 on the site of two earlier church buildings dating back to 1707.

The church congregation still meets weekly.

== See also ==
- Baptists in the United States

== Gallery ==
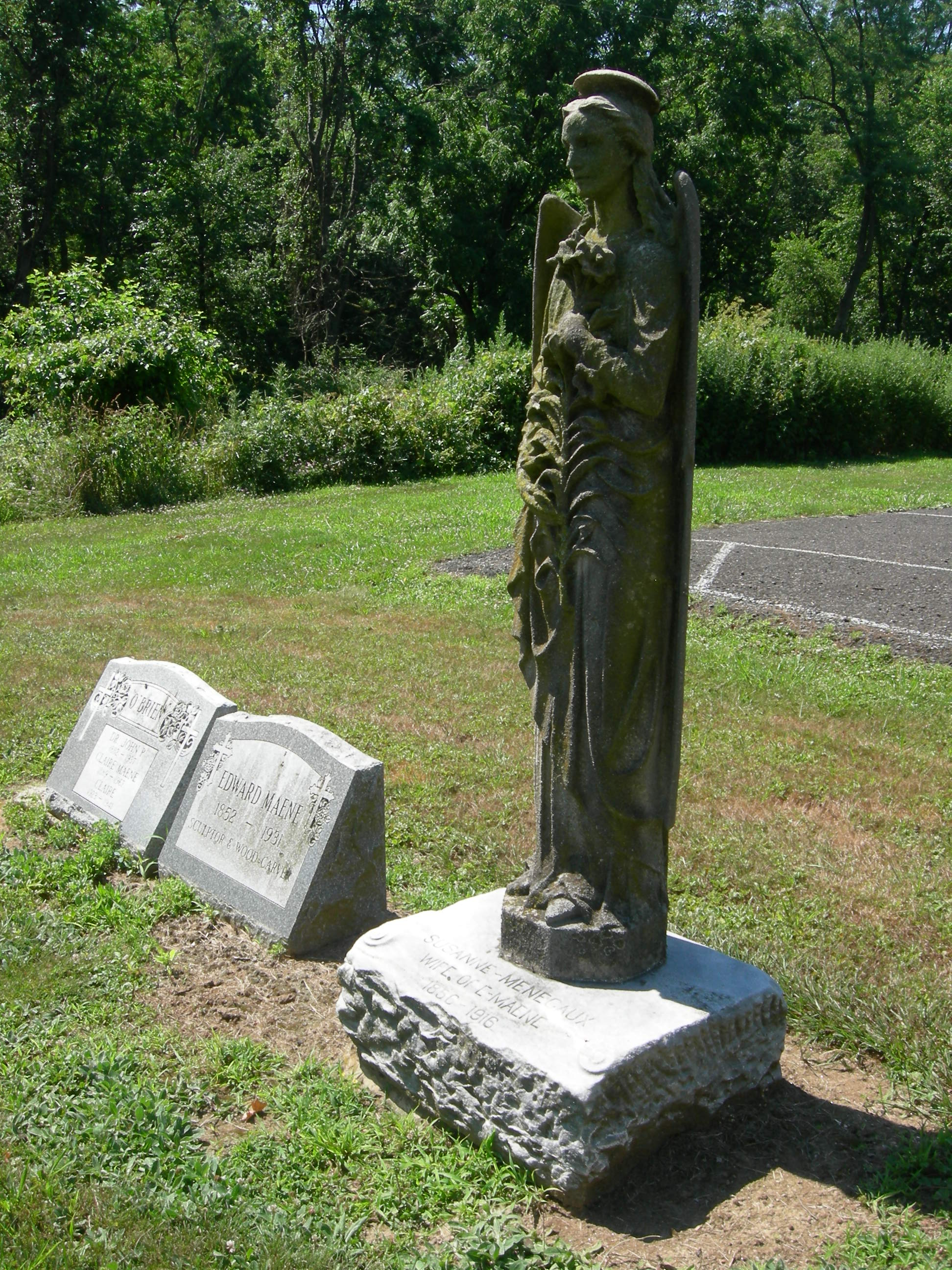
Old Pennepack Baptist Church Cemetery
