= Politz Hebrew Academy =

- Fayette School
- U.S. National Register of Historic Places
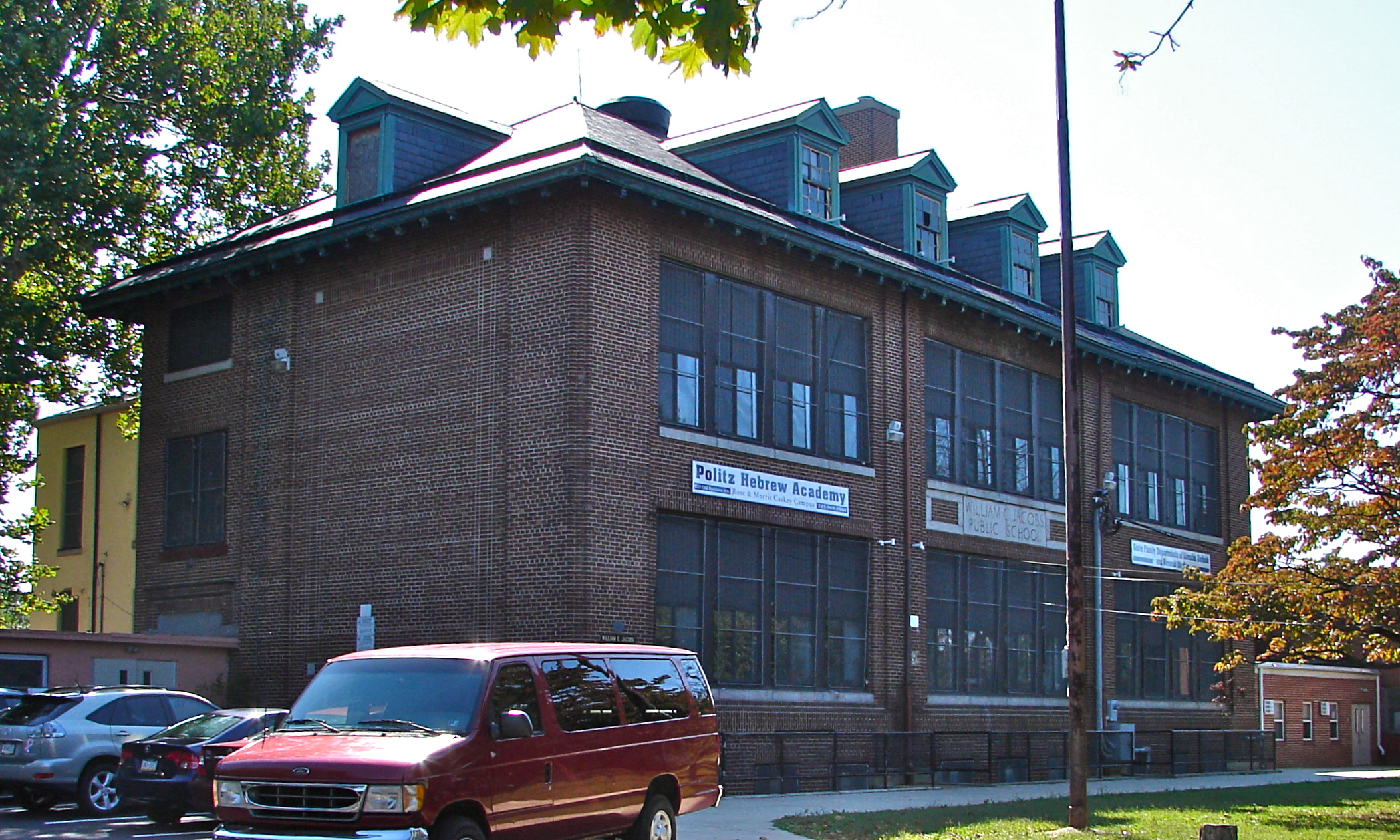
- Fayette School, October 2010

- Location within Philadelphia Location within Pennsylvania Location within the United States
- Location: 9225 Old Bustleton Ave., Philadelphia, Pennsylvania
- Coordinates: 40°04′50″N 75°02′21″W
- Area: 1 acre (0.40 ha)
- Built: 1855, 1915
- Architect: Samuel Sloan,
- Architectural style: Colonial Revival
- MPS: Philadelphia Public Schools TR
- NRHP reference No.: 86003295
- Added to NRHP: December 4, 1986

The Politz Yeshiva and Bais Yaakov, formerly known as Politz Hebrew Academy and the William C. Jacobs School and the Fayette School, is a historic American school that is located in the Bustleton neighborhood of Philadelphia, Pennsylvania.

The building was added to the National Register of Historic Places in 1988.

== History and architectural features ==
This historic building consists of an original section that was designed by Samuel Sloan in 1855 and the main building, which was built in 1915. The original building is a two-story, stone building sheathed in stucco. The 1915 building is a 2 1/2-story, three-bay, rectangular brick building in the Colonial Revival style. It features a hipped roof and gable dormers.
