= Piper-Price House =

Coordinates: 40.081679°N 75.209025°W

General information
- Town or city: Philadelphia
- Country: United States

Height
- Architectural: Italianate

The Piper-Price House is a home designed by architect Samuel Sloan. It is located in the Chestnut Hill neighborhood of Philadelphia. It is symmetrical, with a central tower designed to provide a view.
