= Leigh Street Baptist Church =

Historic church in Virginia, US

- U.S. National Register of Historic Places
- Virginia Landmarks Register
- Richmond City Historic District
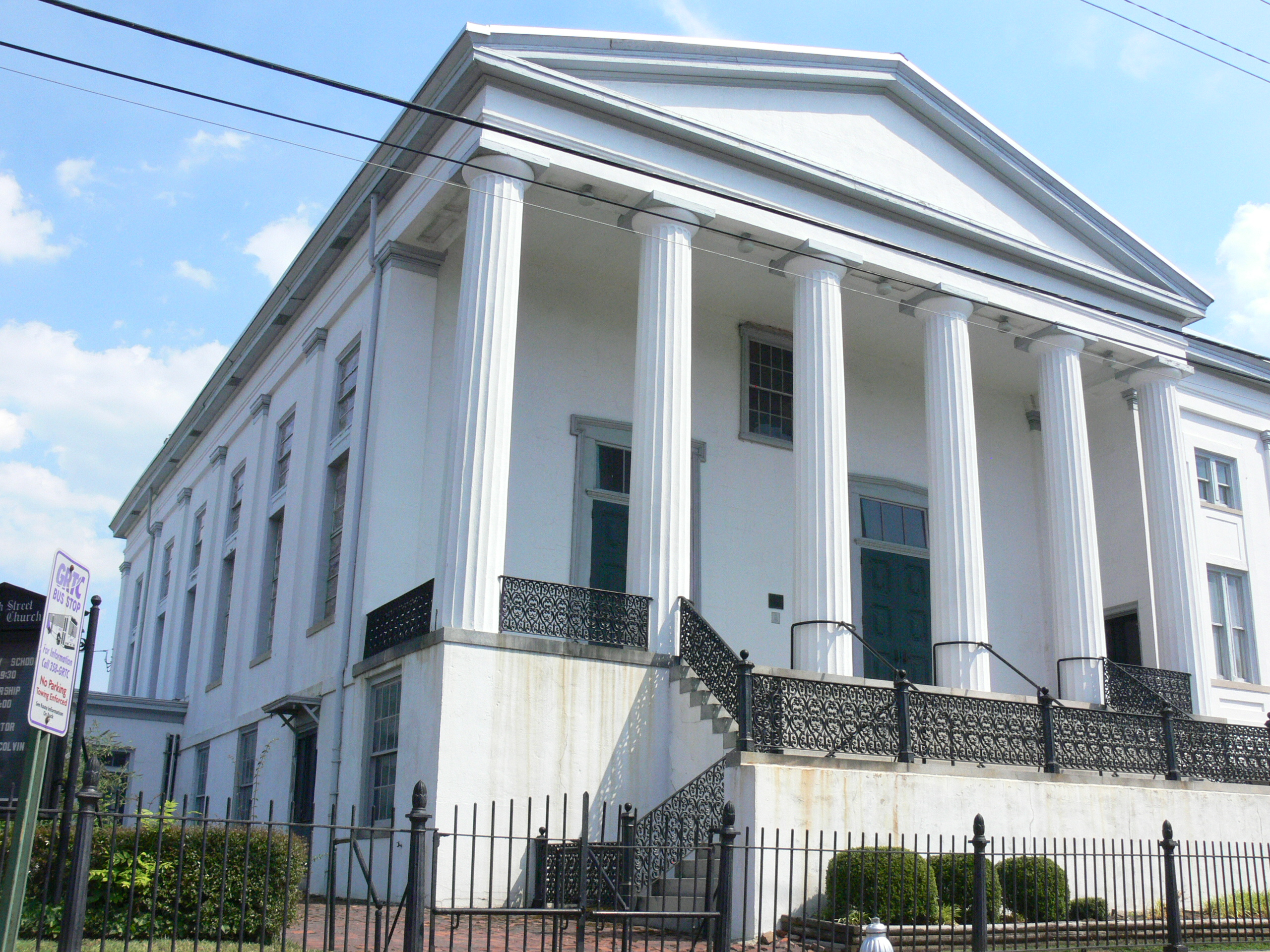
- Leigh Street Baptist Church, July 2011

- Location within Virginia Location within the United States
- Location: 517 N. 25th St., Richmond, Virginia
- Coordinates: 37°32′1″N 77°25′0″W
- Area: 9.9 acres (4.0 ha)
- Built: 1854-1857
- Architect: Sloan, Samuel
- Architectural style: Greek Revival
- NRHP reference No.: 72001523
- VLR No.: 127-0011

Significant dates
- Added to NRHP: March 16, 1972
- Designated VLR: November 16, 1971

Leigh Street Baptist Church, also known as Church Hill Presbyterian Church, is a historic Southern Baptist church in Church Hill North Historic District which is in Richmond, Virginia. It was designed by architect Samuel Sloan and built between 1854 and 1857. It is a three-story, Greek Revival style stuccoed brick structure. It features a Grecian Doric, pedimented portico with six fluted columns and a full entablature which continues around the side of the church. Additions were made in 1911, 1917, and 1930.

It was listed on the National Register of Historic Places in 1972. In 2021, the Baptist congregation transferred its building to Church Hill Presbyterian Church, a church plant of the Presbyterian Church in America.
