= Bustleton, Philadelphia =

Bustleton
- Neighborhood of Philadelphia
- Location within Philadelphia
- Country: United States
- State: Pennsylvania
- County: Philadelphia County
- City: Philadelphia
- Area codes: 215, 267, and 445

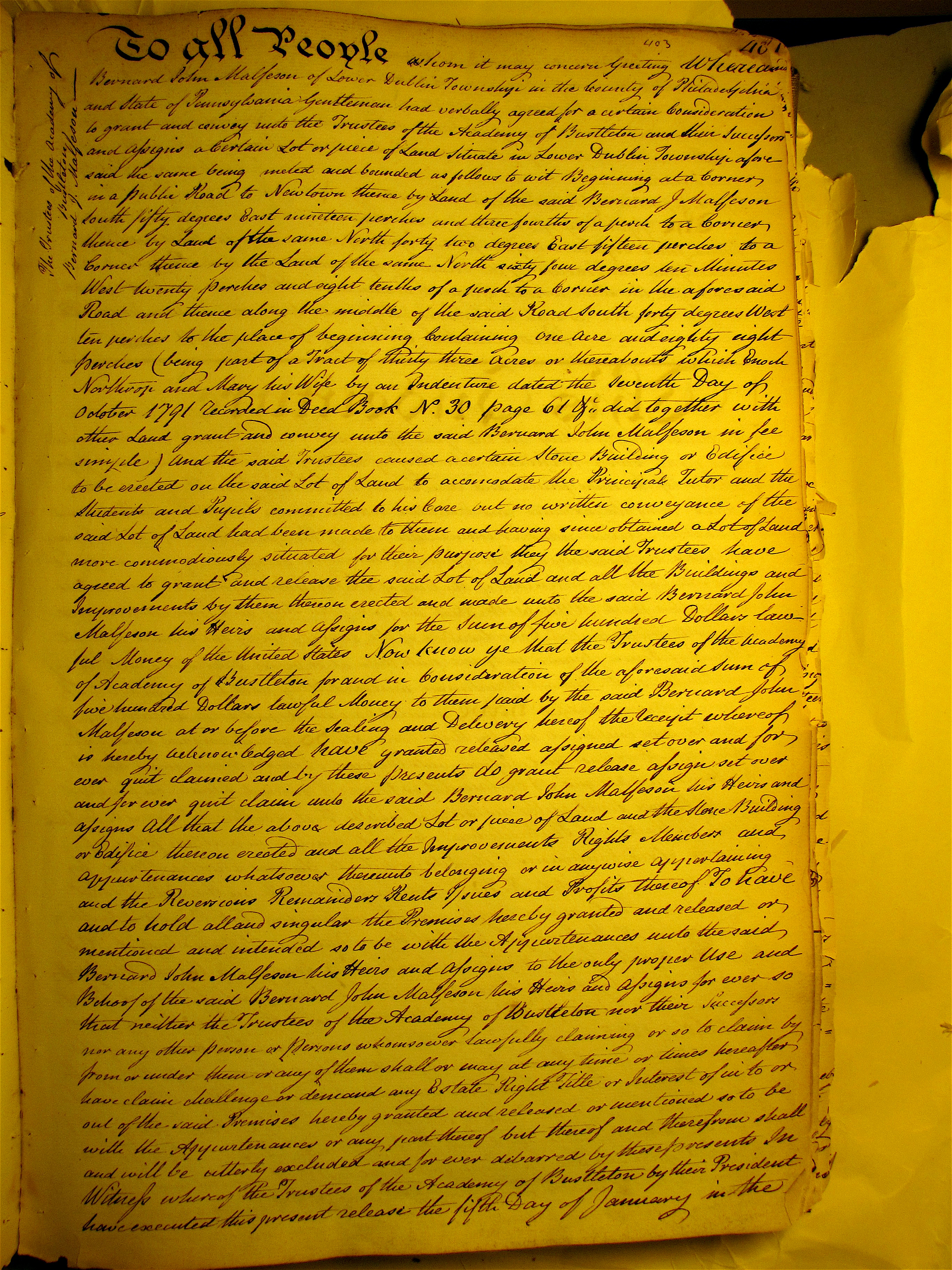
Deed to Bustleton Academy, c. 1811

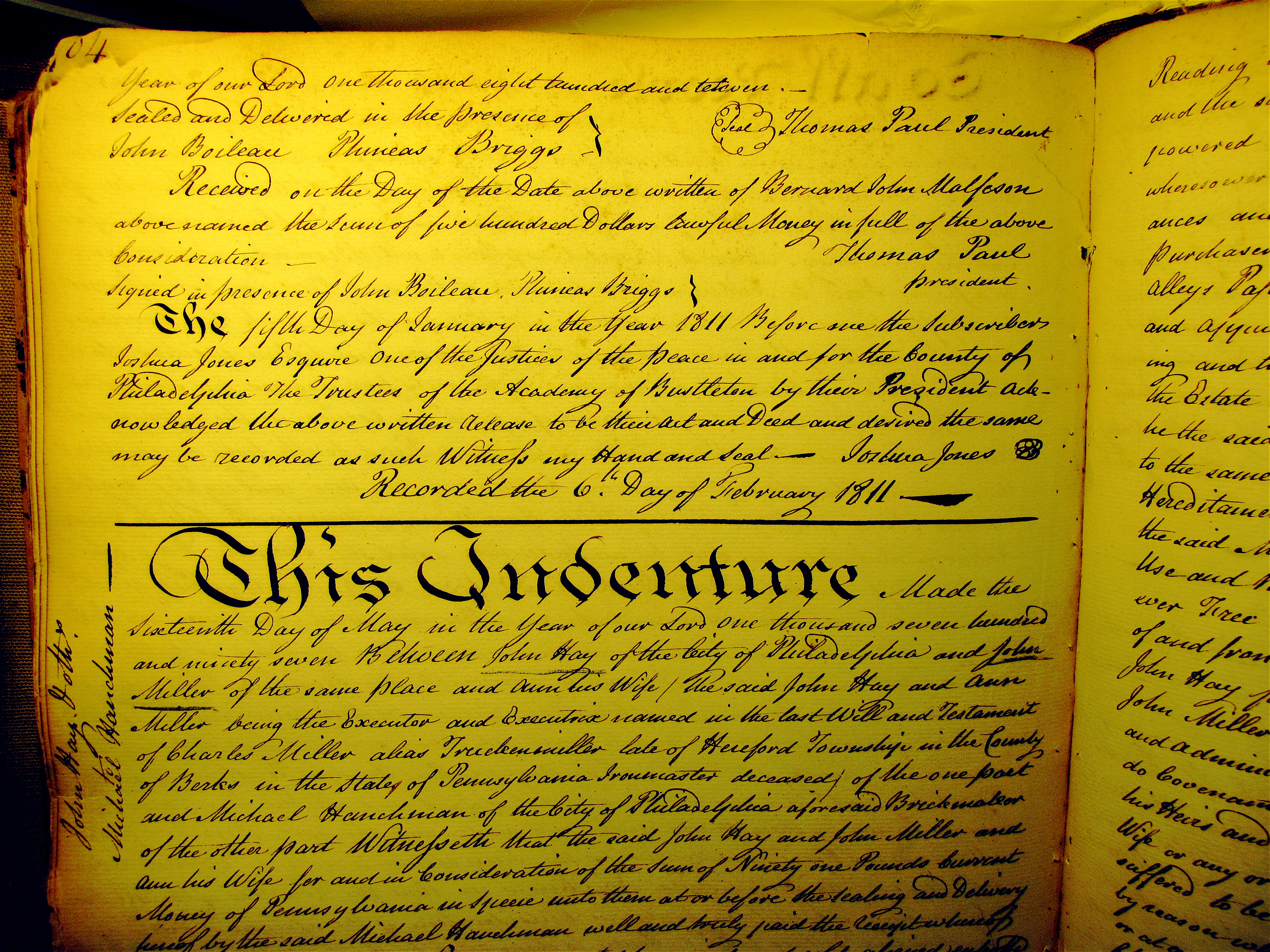
Deed to Academy at Bustleton, c. 1811

The Bustleton section of Northeast Philadelphia, United States is located in the Far Northeast, north of Rhawnhurst and Fox Chase and south of Somerton; sitting between Roosevelt Boulevard to the east, the city boundary to the west, Red Lion Road to the north, and Pennypack Park to the south, it is centered at the intersection of Grant Avenue and Bustleton Avenue (PA-532) and is completely included in the 19115 postal ZIP code.

In the early history of the city, the neighborhood was centered on the Bustleton Tavern, a local bar established before the American Revolution. Pennypack Park is part of the Fairmount Park system and was the site of much industry, including mills. The area was a trading center and had hotels drawing farmers bringing goods for sale via horse and buggy. Much of the commerce was also conducted via small streams and rivers of the present-day Pennypack Watershed. The old Paul's Run waterway once provided navigation from the Bustleton Tavern all the way to the Delaware River.

Bustleton was originally part of Lower Dublin Township, also known as Dublin Township, a defunct township that was located in Philadelphia County, Pennsylvania. The township ceased to exist and was incorporated into the City of Philadelphia following the passage of the Act of Consolidation, 1854.

Bustleton is home to the Lower Dublin Baptist Church, one of the oldest churches in America. Its burial ground contains the remains of many notable Americans and Revolutionary War Soldiers. Another church is the Protestant Episcopal Church of Saint Luke The Beloved Physician. It is the only church in Philadelphia that was designed by the architect Richard Upjohn of New York. It is located on Welsh Road and has a burial ground, now home to the veterans from the Civil War to present. It was consecrated on August 30, 1861.

The 1870 Roman Catholic Church of Maternity, Blessed Virgin Mary on Old Bustleton Ave in Pennypack Park is the large Roman Catholic parish that served as a mother church for most of the parishes in the Northeast section of Philadelphia. Saint Katherine Drexel attended Mass in the Old BVM Church.

One of the early schools went by the name: Bustleton Academy, also known as The academy at Bustelton, not to be confused with Lower Dublin Academy which is an older school, located in the Holmesburg section of Lower Dublin.

== Present day ==
In the present day, Bustleton is largely a residential community with major commercial areas on Roosevelt Boulevard, Bustleton Avenue, Grant Avenue, and Red Lion Road. It has minimal industrial presence. US Census Bureau data show that the community is home to an increasingly racially and ethnically diverse population with many immigrant groups represented; in particular one can see store-fronts, billboards, and newspapers in Russian (especially along Bustleton Avenue) from the many immigrants from Russia, Ukraine, and other former Soviet Republics.

== Demographics ==
According to the 2000 US Census, the total population was 31,853 of whom 45.9% were male, less than the 49.1% of the total US population who was male in 2000. Just less than 17% of area residents were under 18 years old, compared with over a quarter throughout the US. Nearly 27% were 65 years or older, well over twice the rate in the general population; four% of the total Bustleton population was 85 years or older. Reflecting the large concentration of older citizens, the median age in Bustleton was 46.8 years compared with 35.3 years nationwide, and local residents were somewhat more likely to be disabled, 26.4% versus a national average of 19.3%.

Whites made up 87.1% of the population (US share was 75.1%), blacks were 3.5% (US share was 12.3%), Asians were 7.0% (US share was 3.6%) with the majority of those Indian-American. Nearly one-third of residents spoke a foreign language at home compared with less than 18% nationwide.

Economically, only 53.4% of those 16 years or older were in the labor force in 2000, well below the US average of 63.9% but the per capita income of $21,540 was nearly identical to the national level. Less than 10% were below the poverty level (US rate was 12.4%).

Four of every five adults, 25 years and over, were at least high school graduates as of 2000, and one in four had at least a bachelor's degree (slightly more than the US population).

Bustleton is home to many of the city's Police Officers and Firefighters.

By 2022, the neighborhood had a sizeable population from the former Soviet Union. In 1987, Jewish people made up a large number of the neighborhood's residents.

== Transportation ==
Public transportation is provided by several SEPTA bus and regional rail routes, including bus routes 19, 58, 67, 88, and the West Trenton Line and Fox Chase Line regional rail lines in nearby communities. Major roads include Welsh Road, Verree Road, Red Lion Road (PA 63), Bustleton Avenue (PA 532), Grant Avenue, Krewstown Road, and the Roosevelt Boulevard (U.S. 1). Bustleton is home to two of the most dangerous intersections in the United States: Roosevelt Boulevard at Grant Avenue and at Red Lion Road. After decades of complaints due to the large numbers of accidents, these intersections became the first in Philadelphia to have cameras installed which record the license plates of vehicles entering the intersections after the traffic light has turned red. The program has since spread to many intersections throughout the city.

It is bordered on the east by Northeast Philadelphia Airport, a municipal reliever airport that dates to World War II.

== Housing ==
According to the 2000 US Census, there were 13,719 occupied housing units, 62% were owner-occupied and 38% were renter-occupied; the 423 vacant units were just three% of all Bustleton-units, a vacancy rate one-third that of the US. There were 7,209 single-family owner-occupied homes with a median value of $120,000, just $400 more than the median for the US as a whole.

In 2007, newly constructed single homes were selling for between $350,000 and $500,000. Average existing home values are approximately $200,000 to $350,000 for single homes and $175,000 to $250,000 for twin homes. There are no row homes in Bustleton, though there are several dozen apartment complexes and condominiums, and a significant number of the homes are side-by-side duplexes, often referred to by locals as "twins".

== Infrastructure and government ==
The United States Postal Service operates the Bustleton Post Office at 9925 Bustleton Avenue. This Post Office serves the communities of Bustleton (19115, 19152) and Somerton (19116).

The 7th District Police Station at Bustleton and Bowler shares the building with the fire station and other smaller municipal offices.

The neighborhood is part of the 10th City Council District, currently represented by Brian J. O'Neill.

== Education ==
=== Primary and secondary schools ===
The area is served by the School District of Philadelphia. The primary public elementary schools are Joseph J. Greenberg Elementary, which is K-8, and Anne Frank Elementary, which is K-5. Most children that attend Anne Frank then attend C.C.A. Baldi Middle School, which is 6–8. The primary public high school, George Washington High School, is located on Bustleton Avenue, just north of the northernmost boundary of Red Lion Road.

Anne Frank opened in 1961 as Bustleton Elementary School and received its current name in 1987. It was renamed at the suggestion of the Anne Frank Institute. The school board decided to rename an elementary school that had a non-person name. The Philadelphia Inquirer stated that it was likely the first school in the United States to be named after Frank, and the first school in the city with a teenager as its namesake.

Maternity of the Blessed Virgin Mary Roman Catholic parish sponsors a large elementary school, of the Roman Catholic Archdiocese of Philadelphia. There are no Roman Catholic parochial high schools in Bustleton, but many students go to Archbishop Ryan High School (co-ed), Father Judge High School (all boys), St. Hubert's High School (all girls), or Bishop McDevitt High School (co-ed). Politz Hebrew Academy and Lehigh Christian Academy both serve Pre-K to 8th grade. The Politz School occupies the buildings of the former Jacobs and Fayette Public Schools. The Fayette School, a Samuel Sloan building, was listed on the National Register of Historic Places in 1988 and dates to 1854.

Local students may also attend a variety of academies or prep schools (both charter, private, and parochial) both within Bustleton and in the larger metropolitan area.

There are no colleges or universities in the neighborhood.

=== Public libraries ===
Free Library of Philadelphia operates the Bustleton Branch at 10199 Bustleton Avenue at Verree Road, near George Washington High School, in the adjacent Somerton section of the city.

== Organizations ==
The Greater Bustleton Civic League, originally an alliance of the major local churches but now a neighborhood organization dealing primarily with zoning issues, has served the area for more than sixty years. Youth sports are organized by the Bustleton Bengals which has its home field at Robert Hayes Memorial Playground, named for a slain Philadelphia police officer who was an area resident, though, locals refer to the playground and the surrounding park areas as either Conwell Playground or Five Diamonds (due to its five baseball fields).

== Businesses ==
In 2005, there were 593 business establishments in Bustleton, employing 8,933 with an annual payroll of $244,673,000. There were 120 Health and Social Services (reflecting the large senior population) and 100 Retail establishments. Bustleton is headquarters for the American Heritage Federal Credit Union, the sixth largest in Pennsylvania.

== Notable person ==
- John Robbins, member of the U.S. House of Representatives
