= Samuel Sloan (architect) =

American architect

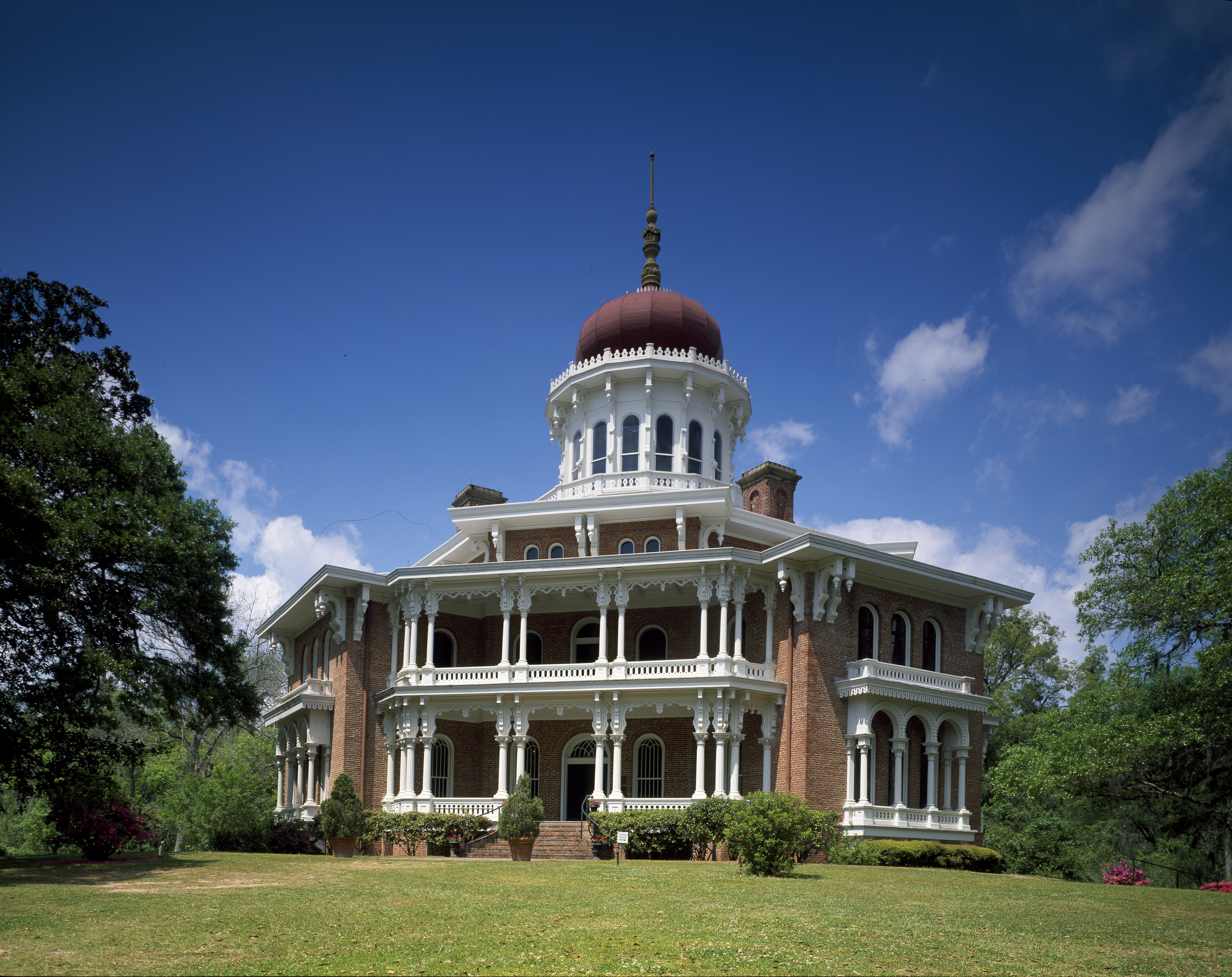
- "Longwood" (Haller Nutt mansion), Natchez, Mississippi (1859–1862, unfinished).
- Born: March 7, 1815; Chester County, Pennsylvania, U.S.
- Died: July 19, 1884 (aged 69); Raleigh, North Carolina, U.S.
- Occupation: Architect
- Buildings: Kirkbride's Insane Asylum, Philadelphia; Longwood, Natchez; Bartram Hall, Philadelphia (demolished)

Samuel Sloan (March 7, 1815 – July 19, 1884) was a Philadelphia-based architect and best-selling author of architecture books in the mid-19th century. He specialized in Italianate villas and country houses, churches, and institutional buildings. His most famous building—the octagonal mansion "Longwood" in Natchez, Mississippi—is unfinished; construction was abandoned during the American Civil War.

== Early life, marriage, and family ==
Born on March 7, 1815, in Honeybrook Township, Chester County, Pennsylvania, the son of William Sloan and Mary Kirkwood, Sloan trained as a carpenter and came to Philadelphia in the mid-1830s. He is said to have worked with John Haviland on Eastern State Penitentiary and with Isaac Holden on the former Pennsylvania Hospital for the Insane.

Samuel Sloan married Mary Pennell in 1843. Their children were Ellwood Pennell, Howard L., Laura W., and Ada. He had three grandchildren by his eldest son, Ellwood. They were Maurice, Helen and Samuel A. Sloan.

== Career ==
By 1851, Sloan had won a commission for the Delaware County, Pennsylvania, courthouse and jail, and designed Andrew Eastwick's villa "Bartram Hall" near the site of Bartram's Garden in Philadelphia. These successes prompted him to begin to list his vocation as "architect".

=== Authorship ===
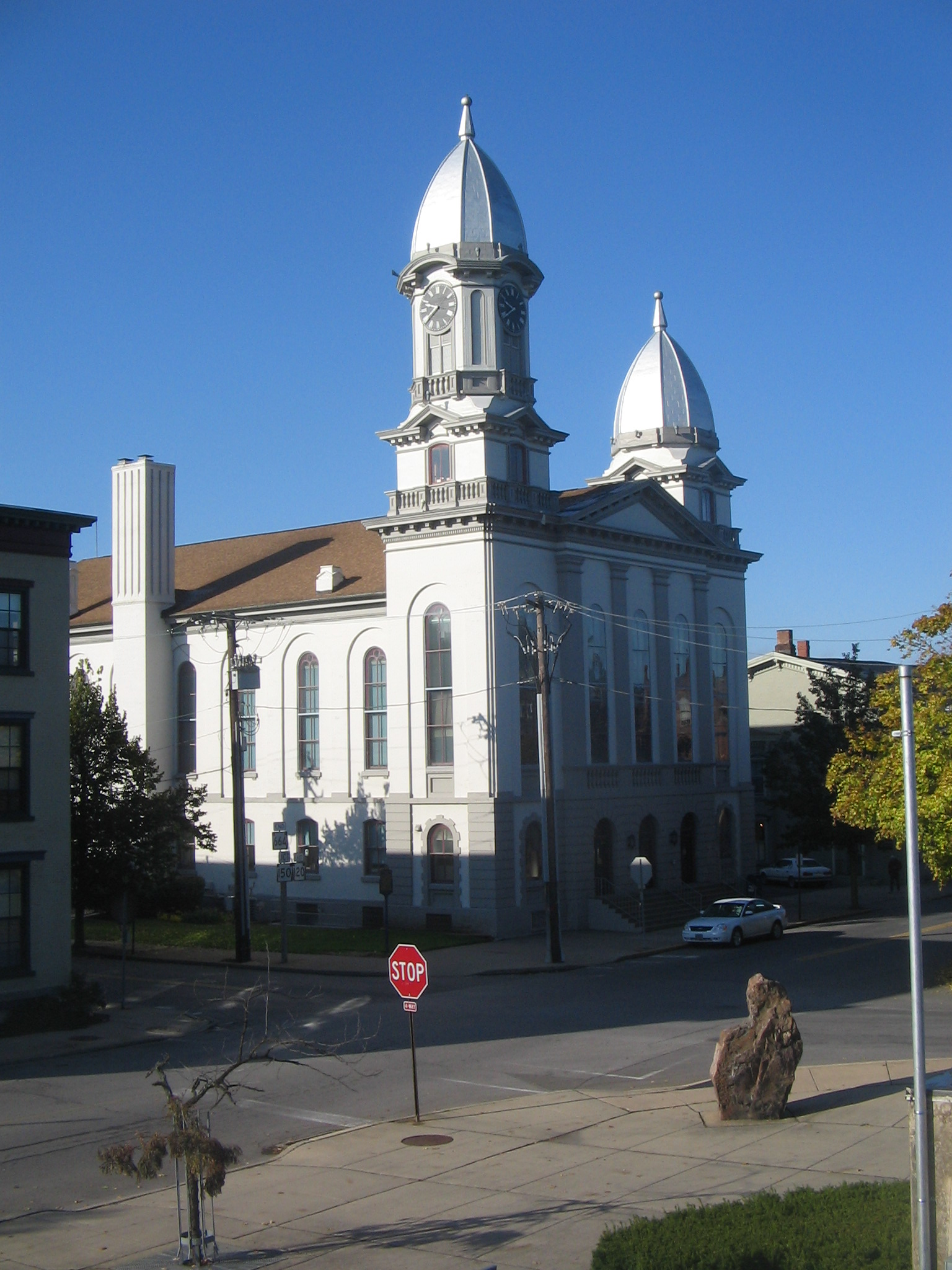
Clinton County Courthouse, Lock Haven, Pennsylvania (1869). Samuel Sloan & Addison Hutton, architects.

Sloan became a prolific author on architecture most notably for The Model Architect as well as City and Suburban Architecture and Sloan's Constructive Architecture (1859). In 1861, he wrote Sloan's Homestead Architecture and American Houses, and A Variety of Designs for Rural Buildings. Sloan also reached thousands of potential customers through the pages of Godey's Lady's Book, which began publishing his designs in 1852.

"The man who has a home," wrote Sloan in 1871, "feels a love for it a thankfulness for its possession and a proportionate determination to uphold and defend it against all invading influences. Such a man is, of necessity . . . a good citizen; for he has a stake in society."

=== Economic downturns and work outside Philadelphia area ===
Economic downturns in the late 1850s as well as the American Civil War put a halt to his professional success and Sloan briefly left Philadelphia for New York in 1867. Important examples of his later work are found outside Pennsylvania, notably in Morganton, North Carolina's Western State Asylum for the Insane. Sloan ended up building about 20 hospitals for the insane based on the "Kirkbride Plan System".

Sloan enjoyed some later success in North Carolina, opening an office in Raleigh, where he died on July 19, 1884. His body was buried in Mount Moriah Cemetery, Philadelphia, Lot 11 Sec 20.

=== Associated architects ===
Architects associated with Sloan include: Charles M. Autenrieth (1828–1906), Edward Collins (1821–1902), Willis G. Hale (1848–1907), Addison Hutton (1834–1916), John S. Stewart and Thomas Webb Richards (1836–1911), Isaac Pursell (1853–1910), and Charles Balderston (1852–1924). his half-brother, Fletcher Sloan, was also an architect.

== Work ==
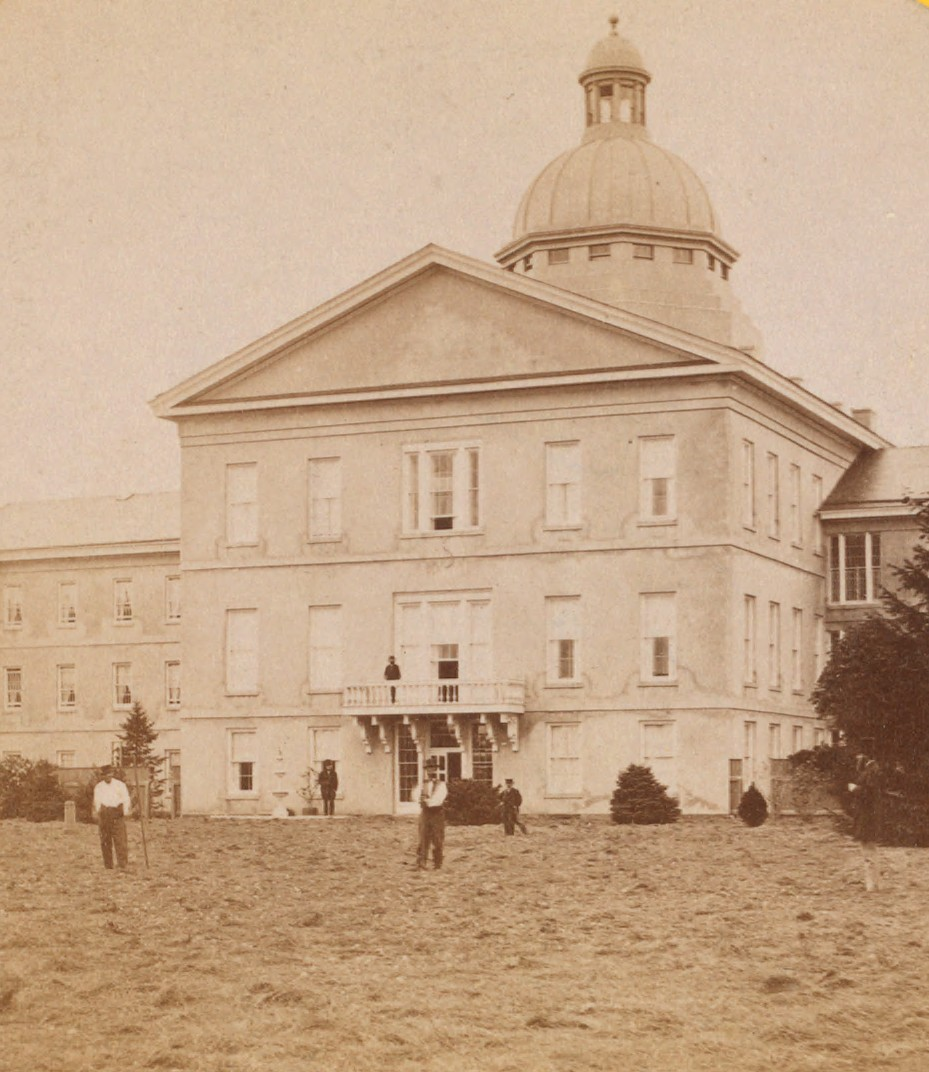
Institute of the Pennsylvania Hospital, Philadelphia, Pennsylvania (Kirkbride's Insane Asylum) (1856–1859)

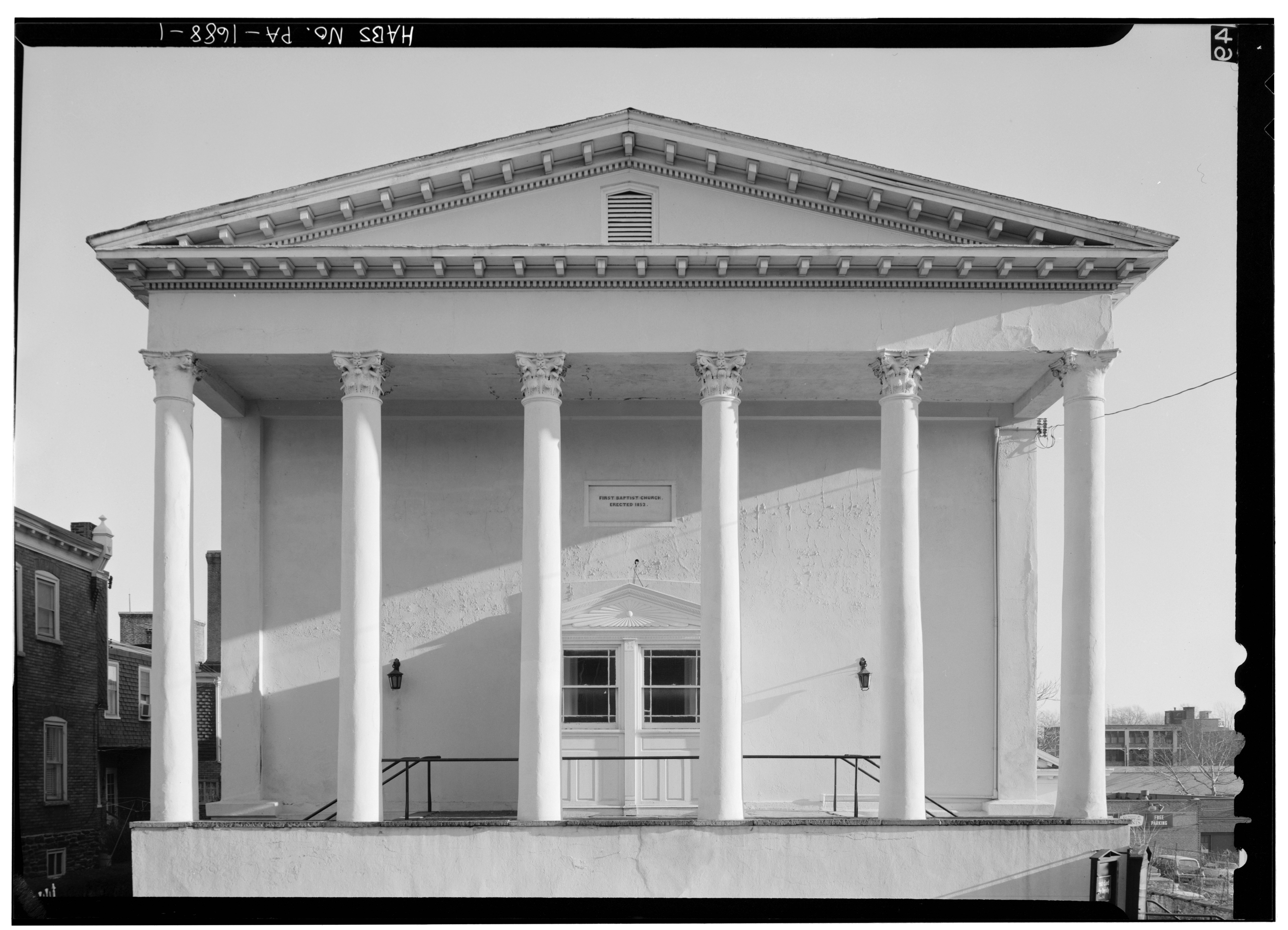
First Baptist Church of Germantown

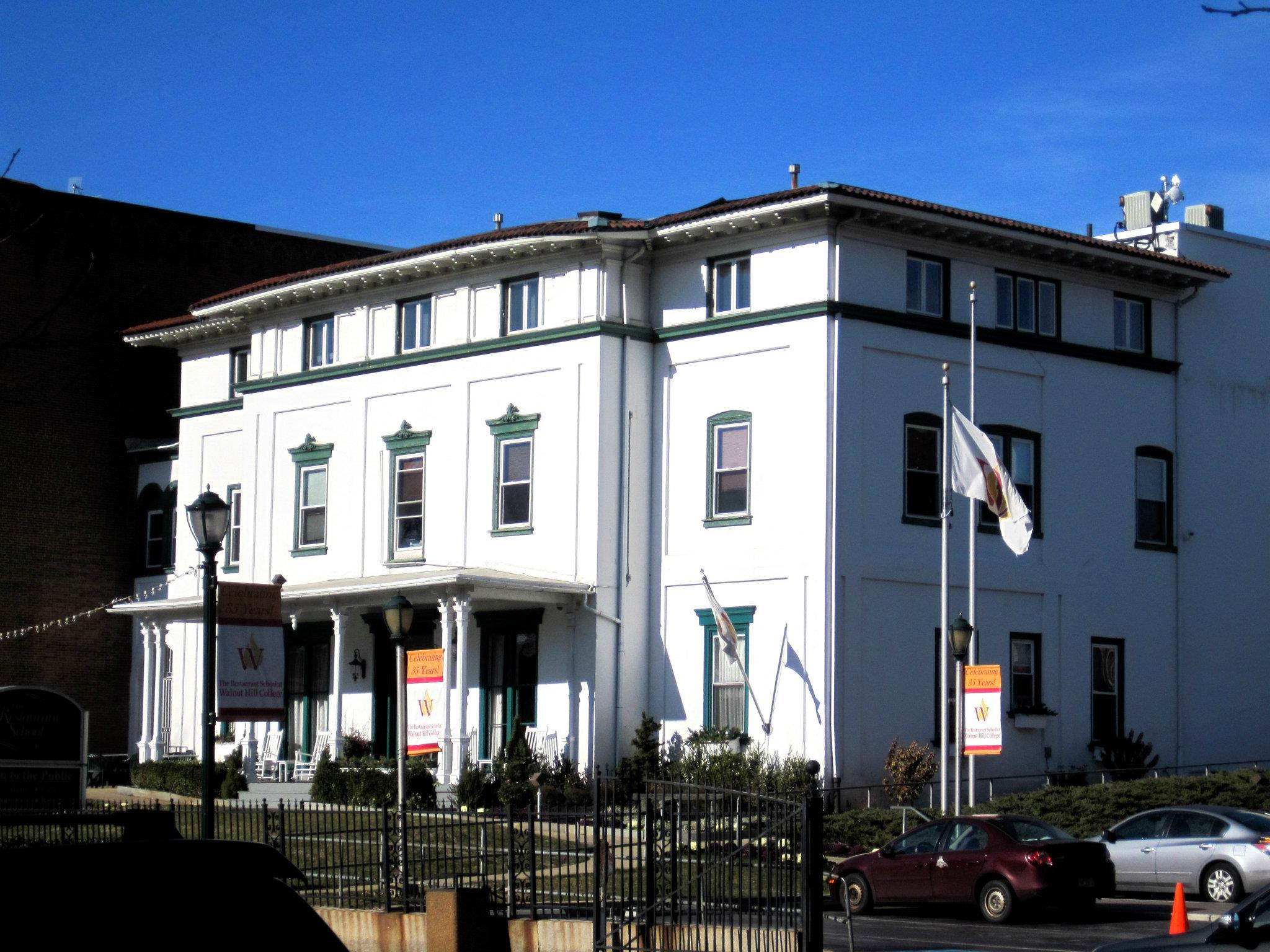
Allison Mansion, Philadelphia, Pennsylvania (1860)

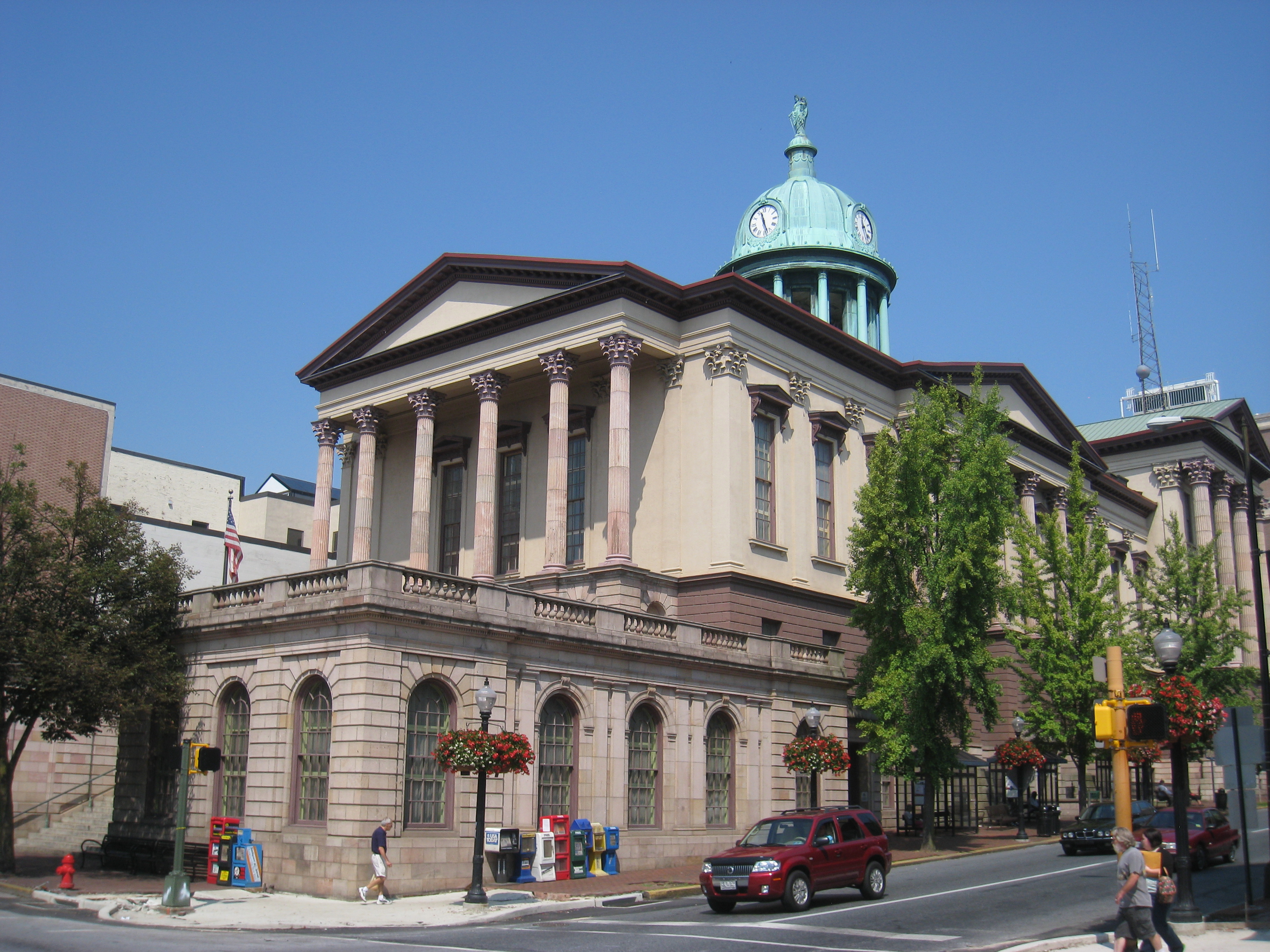
Lancaster County Courthouse, Lancaster, Pennsylvania (1852)

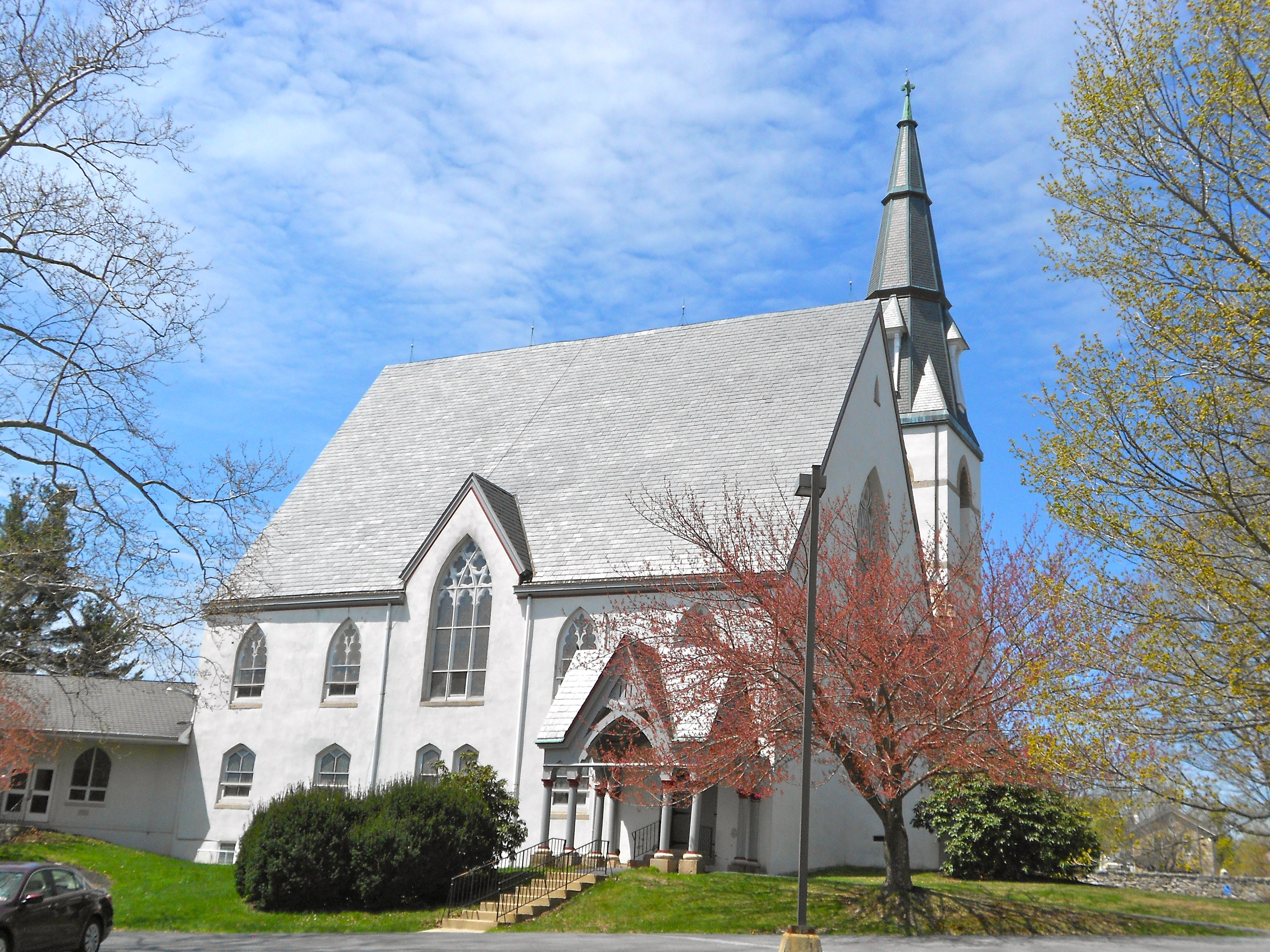
Forks of the Brandywine Presbyterian Church (1875)

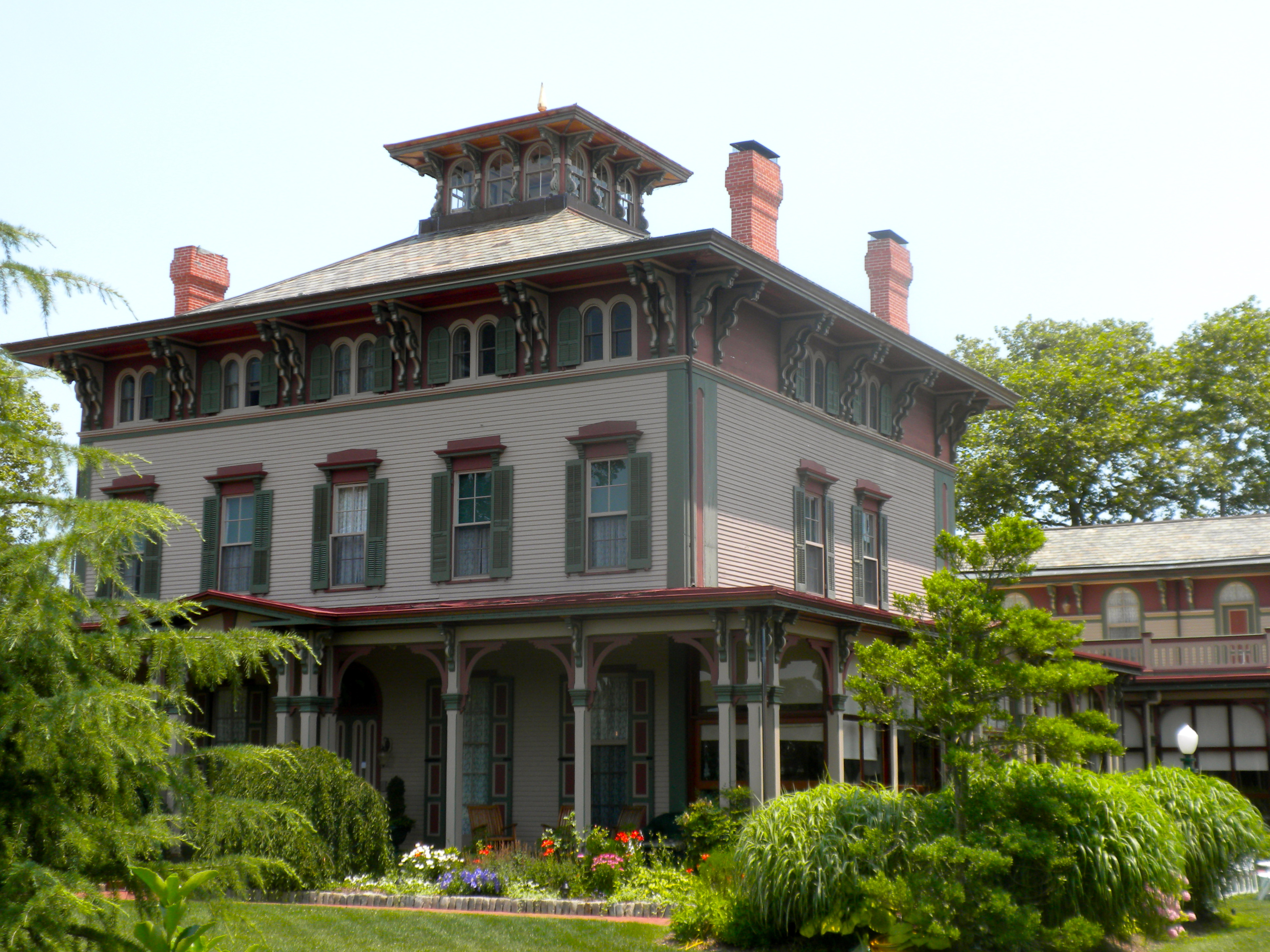
George Allen house, Cape May, New Jersey (1863).

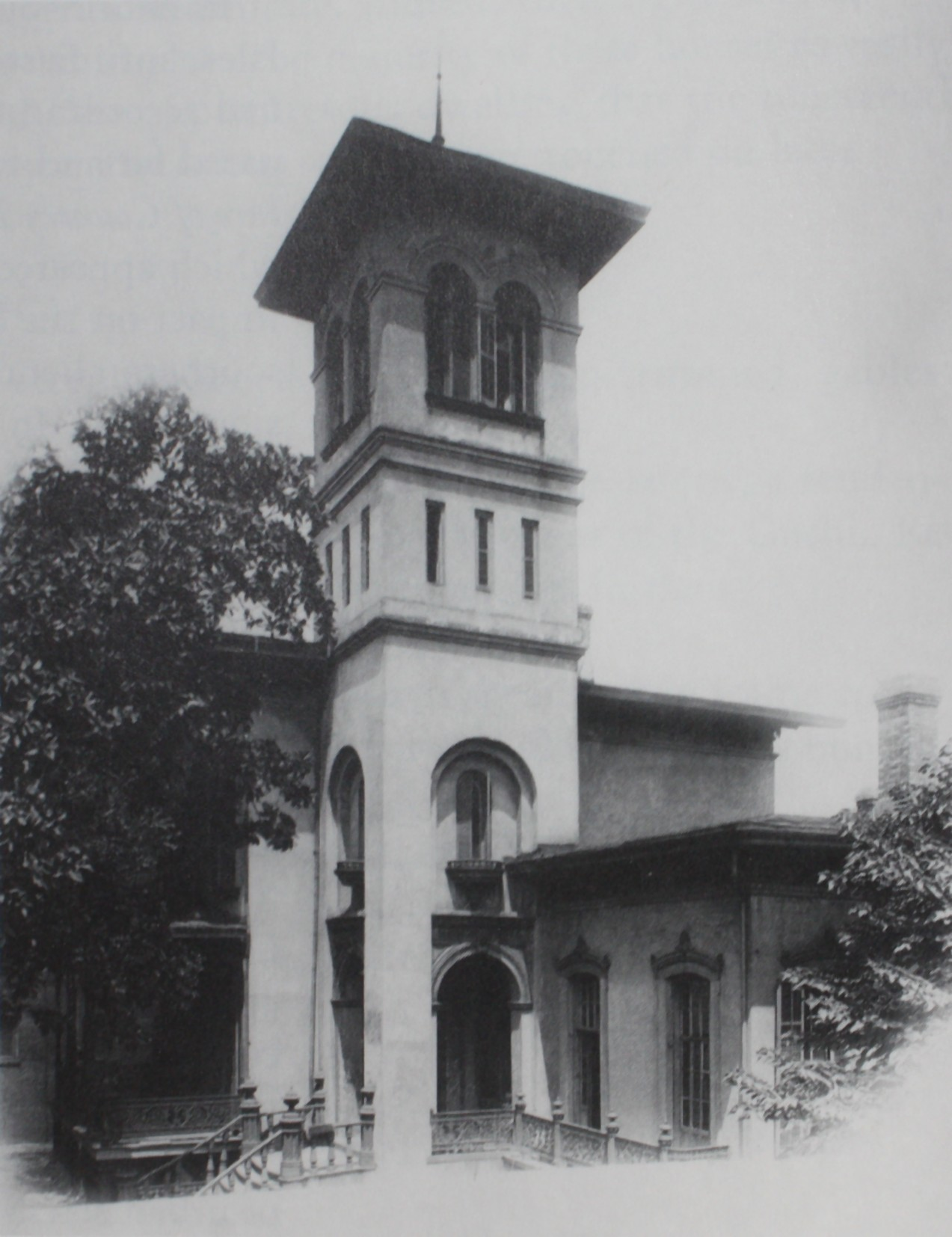
Winter Place, Montgomery, Alabama (1855)

Designated U.S. National Historic Landmarks:

- Fulton Hall, also known as Fulton Opera House and Fulton Theatre, Lancaster, PA (1852).
- Fayette School, also known as William C. Jacobs School, Northeast Philadelphia, PA (1855) Scheduled for demolition sometime in August/September 2012.
- Asa Packer Mansion, Jim Thorpe, Pennsylvania (1859–1861)
- "Longwood", Haller Nutt Mansion, Natchez, Mississippi (designed in 1859, it was never finished due to the Civil War)
- Additions to Mills Building, South Carolina State Hospital, Columbia, South Carolina
- Leigh Street Baptist Church, a Greek Revival church, built between 1854 and 1857 in Church Hill North Historic District which is in Richmond, Virginia.

== Architectural work (partial listing) ==
=== Philadelphia buildings ===
- "Bartram Hall", residence of Andrew M. Eastwick, 54th St. & Lindburgh Blvd., Philadelphia PA – 1850 (demolished)
- Workman’s Housing Rows (2), in association with Joseph Harrison, Jr., Philadelphia, PA - 1853
- The Northern Home for Friendless Children, 23rd & Brown Streets, Philadelphia, PA - 1853
- John Piper House, 129 Bethlehem Pike, Chestnut Hill, Philadelphia, PA - 1854
- Fayette School, Old Bustleton and Welsh Rds., Bustleton, Philadelphia, PA - 1855
- Joseph Harrison Jr. residence, 221 S. 18th St. (East Rittenhouse Square), Philadelphia, PA - 1855 (demolished)
- Masonic Hall, 700 block Chestnut St., Philadelphia - 1855, burned 1886
- Episcopal Church of the Savior, 38th & Chestnut Sts., Philadelphia, PA - 1856 (destroyed by fire 1902, rebuilt within surviving stone walls)
- Institute of the Pennsylvania Hospital, Department for Males (Kirkbride's Insane Asylum), 49th & Market Sts., Philadelphia - 1856–1859
- Polite Temple Baptist Church, Philadelphia, aka First Baptist Church of Germantown – c. 1850
- "Woodland Terrace", 501–519, 500–520 Woodland Terrace, Philadelphia, PA; suburban development built for Charles M. S. Leslie - 1861
- 400 S. 40th Street and 4000 and 4002 Pine Street in the Hamilton Family Estate - 1853–1863
- Allison Mansion, 4207 Walnut St., Philadelphia, PA, 19104 - c.1860
- Drexel Development Historic District - speculative rowhouses designed and built in the 1870s
- Trinity Reformed Church, 1533-39 N. 7th Street, Philadelphia, PA, 1869-72

=== Other Pennsylvania buildings ===
- Delaware County Courthouse (Media, Pennsylvania), Media, PA (considered his first commission) - 1849
- Chester County municipal buildings – 1849
- Lancaster County Courthouse, Lancaster, PA - 1852
- Fulton Opera House, (Originally named Fulton Hall), Lancaster, PA - 1852
- Residence, NE corner of Church & Miner Sts., West Chester, PA – 1854
- The High Street School, Gettysburg, PA - 1857
- Church of St. James the Greater (Bristol), Bristol, PA - 1857
- Asa Packer Mansion, Jim Thorpe, PA - 1859–1861
- "Faunbrook", residence of William Baldwin, 699 Rosedale Ave., West Chester, PA, now a bed & breakfast – 1860
- (Old) Lycoming County Courthouse (destroyed), Williamsport, PA - 1861
- Eli Slifer house, 1 River Rd., Lewisburg, PA – 1861
- Venango County Courthouse, Franklin, PA (with Addison Hutton) - 1868
- Clinton County Courthouse, Lock Haven, PA (with Addison Hutton) - 1869
- East Hall (The Academy Building), Franklin and Marshall College, Lancaster, PA – 1872
- Forks of the Brandywine Presbyterian Church, Glenmoore, PA - 1875
- Third Westmoreland County Courthouse, Greensburg, PA - 1883, demolished (not to be confused with current courthouse)
- Old Main: first building of Shippensburg University of Pennsylvania Campus (then called Cumberland Valley State Normal School), Shippensburg, PA - 1870–1873.
- Northumberland County Courthouse |Northumberland County Courthouse]]

=== New Jersey and Delaware buildings ===
- Town Plan, Riverton, NJ - 1851
- St Paul’s Methodist Episcopal Church, Odessa, DE - 1852
- Camden County Court House, Camden, NJ – 1852
- Joseph Wharton Batsto Mansion, Batsto, New Jersey - 1880
- Sheriff's House and Jail, 2nd St., New Castle, DE - 1857
- Dr. Peter Campbell house, Shrewsbury, NJ - c.1860
- "The Southern Mansion," George Allen house, 720 Washington St. Cape May, NJ – 1863 (based on a published Sloan design)
- West Presbyterian Church, NE corner W. Commerce & Giles Sts., Bridgeton, NJ - 1868–1877
- Town Hall, Middletown, DE – 1869
- Additions to New Jersey State Capitol (new wings), Trenton, NJ - 1871
- Greystone Park Psychiatric Hospital, (a Kirkbride Plan building), Morristown, NJ – 1871 Greystone Photo Album, circa 1899, Morris Plains, N.J. - history and photography (Morristown and Morris Township Public Library, N.J.)
- Prison complex, Dover, DE - 1872

=== Buildings elsewhere ===
- The Southern Ohio Lunatic Asylum; Dayton, Ohio - 1852
- “Winter Place”, residence of Col. Joseph Samuel Winter, Montgomery, AL - 1855
- "Dunleith", residence of Robert P. Dick, 677 Chestnut St., Greensboro, NC - 1856
- Rosedale, near Columbus, Mississippi - 1856
- First Baptist Church, 101 W. McBee Ave., Greenville, SC - 1858
- “Longwood”, Haller Nutt mansion, Natchez, MS – 1859–1862 (unfinished)
- First Baptist Church, 5th & Market Streets, Wilmington, NC – 1859–1870
- Bank of New Hanover (demolished), NW corner Front & Princess Sts., Wilmington NC – c. 1860
- First Presbyterian Church, 125 S. 3rd St., Wilmington, NC – 1861 (destroyed by fire in 1925, the present building is by architect Hobart Upjohn)
- ”McNeal Place”, Bolivar, TN – 1862
- Bryce Hospital, (a Kirkbride Plan building), Tuscaloosa, AL - 1861 (endangered)
- Jemison-Van de Graaff Mansion, 1862 Residence of Senator Robert Jemison, Tuscaloosa, AL
- Connecticut Valley Hospital, Middletown, Connecticut - 1867
- Sylvan Building (Central National Bank), 1500 Main St., Columbia, SC – c. 1868
- Temple of Israel, a synagogue in Wilmington, NC, 1876
- Broughton State Hospital, (aka Western North Carolina Insane Asylum; a Kirkbride Plan building), Morganton, NC – 1883
- North Carolina Executive Mansion, 201 N. Blount St, Raleigh, NC; (completed by his associate Adolphus Bauer) - 1883
- Mistletoe Villa in Henderson, NC is said to have been designed by Sloan but that fact has never been officially documented although historians believe that the style and details are consistent with his other designs - c. 1883–1885
- Bell Building (New Bern Graded School), 517 Hancock St., New Bern, NC - c. 1884–1885
- (Old) Memorial Hall (demolished), University of North Carolina, Chapel Hill, NC – completed 1885
- Walker Hall, South Carolina School for the Deaf and Blind, Spartanburg County, SC - 1884–1885
- Babcock Building, South Carolina State Hospital, Richland County, Bull St., Columbia, SC - 1885

== Books ==
- Samuel Sloan, The Model Architect, Volume One: A Series of Original Designs for Cottages, Villas, Suburban Residences, Etc. ISBN 0-923891-85-4
- Samuel Sloan, The Model Architect, Vol. 2 ISBN 0-923891-86-2
- Harold N. Cooledge, Samuel Sloan: Architect of Philadelphia, 1815–1884 (University of Pennsylvania Press, 1986) ISBN 0-923891-64-1
- Samuel Sloan, City and Suburban Architecture (J. B. Lippincott & CO., Philadelphia, 1867)
