= Wild Cat (Hersheypark) =

Roller coaster at Hersheypark

The Wild Cat
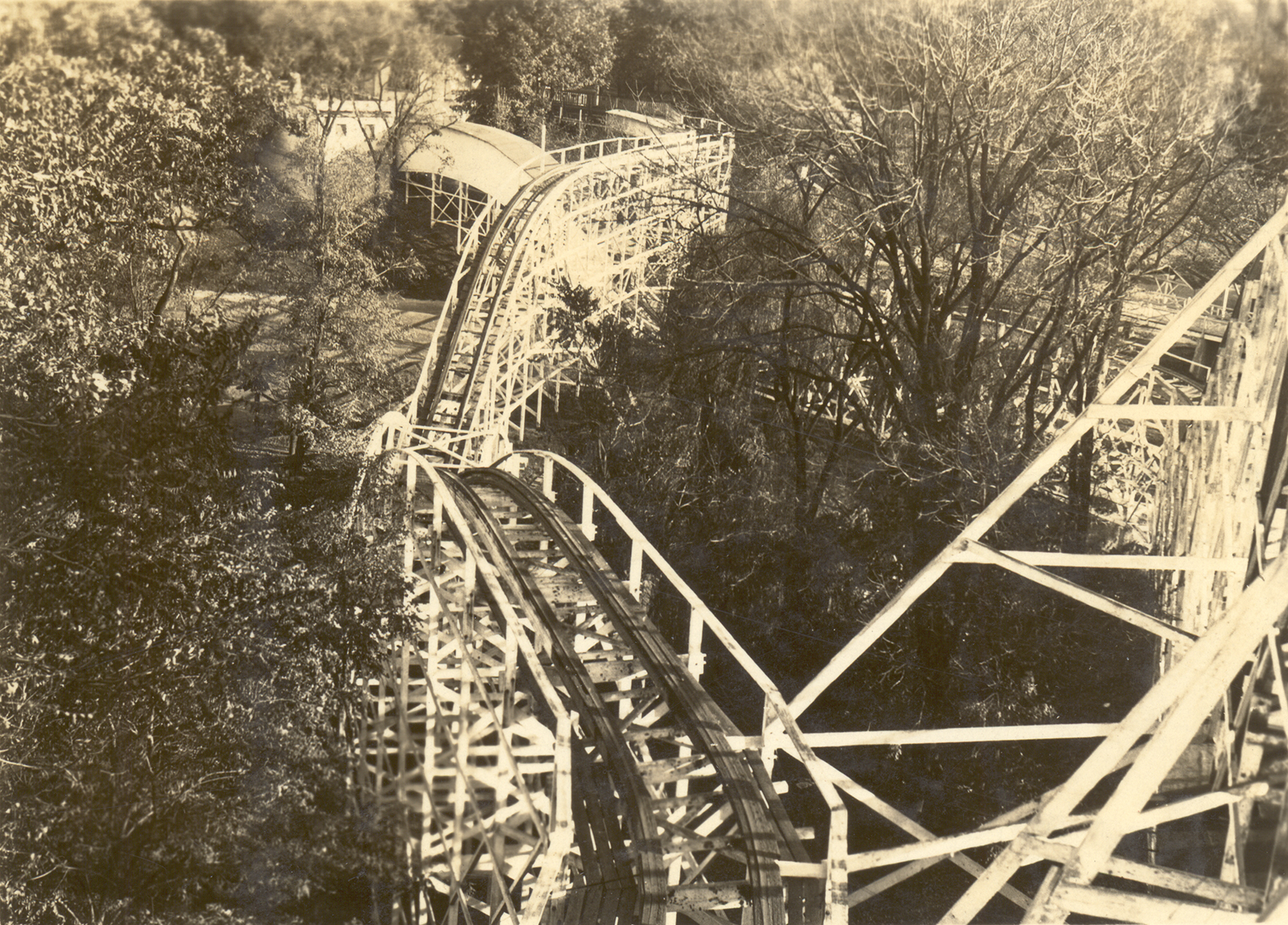
- Wild Cat c. 1925

Hersheypark
- Location: Hersheypark
- Coordinates: 40.2882°N 76.6535°W
- Status: Removed
- Opening date: June 16, 1923
- Closing date: September 9, 1945
- Cost: $50,000

General statistics
- Type: Wood
- Manufacturer: Philadelphia Toboggan Coasters
- Designer: Herbert Schmeck
- Track layout: Out and Back
- Lift/launch system: Chain lift hill
- Drop: 75 ft (23 m)
- Length: 2,331 ft (710 m)
- Inversions: 0
- Trains: 3 trains with 3 cars; riders arranged 2 across in 4 rows for a total of 24 riders per train
- The Wild Cat at RCDB

The Wild Cat, originally named The Joy Ride, was a wooden roller coaster located at Hersheypark in Hershey, Pennsylvania. The roller coaster was constructed in 1923 by the Philadelphia Toboggan Company (PTC). Under an agreement between Hersheypark and PTC, Hersheypark leased the land the coaster occupied, while PTC owned and operated the coaster. The agreement was for 15 years, at which point they had the option to extend the contract. The contract was ultimately extended to 1945. The roller coaster operated from June 16, 1923, through September 1945. PTC and Hershey Park elected to close The Wild Cat and construct a new roller coaster in 1946.

The Wild Cat was the first roller coaster where Herbert Schmeck was credited as the designer.

== History ==
Milton S. Hershey had The Wild Cat built at a cost of $50,000, to celebrate the 20th anniversary of the town of Hershey. The Wild Cat is a wooden rollercoaster. It was the first roller coaster built in Hersheypark. However, unlike all other roller coasters built at the park since, Wild Cat was owned by the Philadelphia Toboggan Coasters (PTC) and the land the ride was built on was leased to PTC on an agreement that expired in 1945.

When the ride opened on June 16, 1923, it was called The Joy Ride, but it was shortly after renamed Wild Cat. The ride stood approximately where the Trailblazer and Storm Runner's Immelmann loop/twist, double roll and snake dive are currently, and the ride went through a tunnel behind the present-day Triple Towers and "Our Friends of the Sea" sea lion show. The first woman to ride the roller coaster is Miss Marion Murrie, the daughter of Hershey baseball coach and Hershey Chocolate factory worker William Murrie.

The roller coaster operated through the 1945 season. It had been decided that Wild Cat would be torn down and replaced with a new wooden roller coaster in a different area of the park (now called Comet Hollow). It had fallen into significant disrepair as a result of the Second World War economy requiring most wood and supplies to go to the United States' war effort. Schmeck designed the replacement roller coaster, Comet, which was Milton Hershey's last purchased ride (he died before Comet's completion), and is still in operation as of the 2026 Hersheypark season.

In 1996, Hersheypark revived the Wildcat name for a wooden roller coaster constructed by Great Coasters International, using the slogan, The Cat is back! This coaster closed on July 31, 2022. It was replaced by Wildcat's Revenge, a hybrid roller coaster constructed by Rocky Mountain Construction, which opened in 2023.

== See also ==
- List of former Hersheypark attractions
