= Skyrush =

Roller coaster at Hersheypark

- Skyrush in June 2021

Hersheypark
- Location: Hersheypark
- Park section: The Hollow
- Coordinates: 40°17′12″N 76°39′19″W
- Status: Operating
- Opening date: May 26, 2012
- Cost: US$25,000,000

General statistics
- Type: Steel
- Manufacturer: Intamin
- Model: Mega Coaster/Wing Coaster (Intamin)
- Track layout: Twister
- Lift/launch system: Cable lift hill
- Height: 200 ft (61 m)
- Drop: 212 ft (65 m)
- Length: 3,600 ft (1,100 m)
- Speed: 75 mph (121 km/h)
- Inversions: 0
- Duration: 1:03
- Max vertical angle: 85°
- Capacity: 1,350 riders per hour
- G-force: 5
- Restraint style: Lap bar
- Height restriction: 54–77 in (137–196 cm)
- Trains: 2 trains with 8 cars; riders arranged 4 across in a single row for a total of 32 riders per train
- Website: Official website
- Skyrush at RCDB

Skyrush is an Intamin prototype Wing Coaster at Hersheypark in Hershey, Pennsylvania, United States. It opened to the general public on May 26, 2012, as Hersheypark's 12th roller coaster and the park's third coaster made by Intamin. Skyrush features a 200 ft (61 m) cable lift that raises the train at 26 ft/s (480 m/min). The roller coaster is located in the Hollow section of Hersheypark, next to the Comet wooden coaster; Skyrush itself is mainly set above Spring Creek.

The concept for what is now Skyrush dates to 2007, but Hershey Entertainment and Resorts Company did not file plans for the ride's construction until August 2010. Hersheypark launched the Attraction 2012 marketing campaign to promote what eventually became Skyrush, and the park officially announced the ride in August 2011. Despite delays caused by flooding, Skyrush opened to the general public on May 26, 2012. Reviews of the ride have generally been positive, and Amusement Today's Golden Ticket Awards ranked Skyrush as the fifth-best new ride for 2012. Additionally, in every year except 2016 and 2020, Skyrush has been ranked in the Golden Ticket Awards as one of the world's 50 best steel roller coasters.

== History ==
Skyrush's logo prior to February 29, 2024

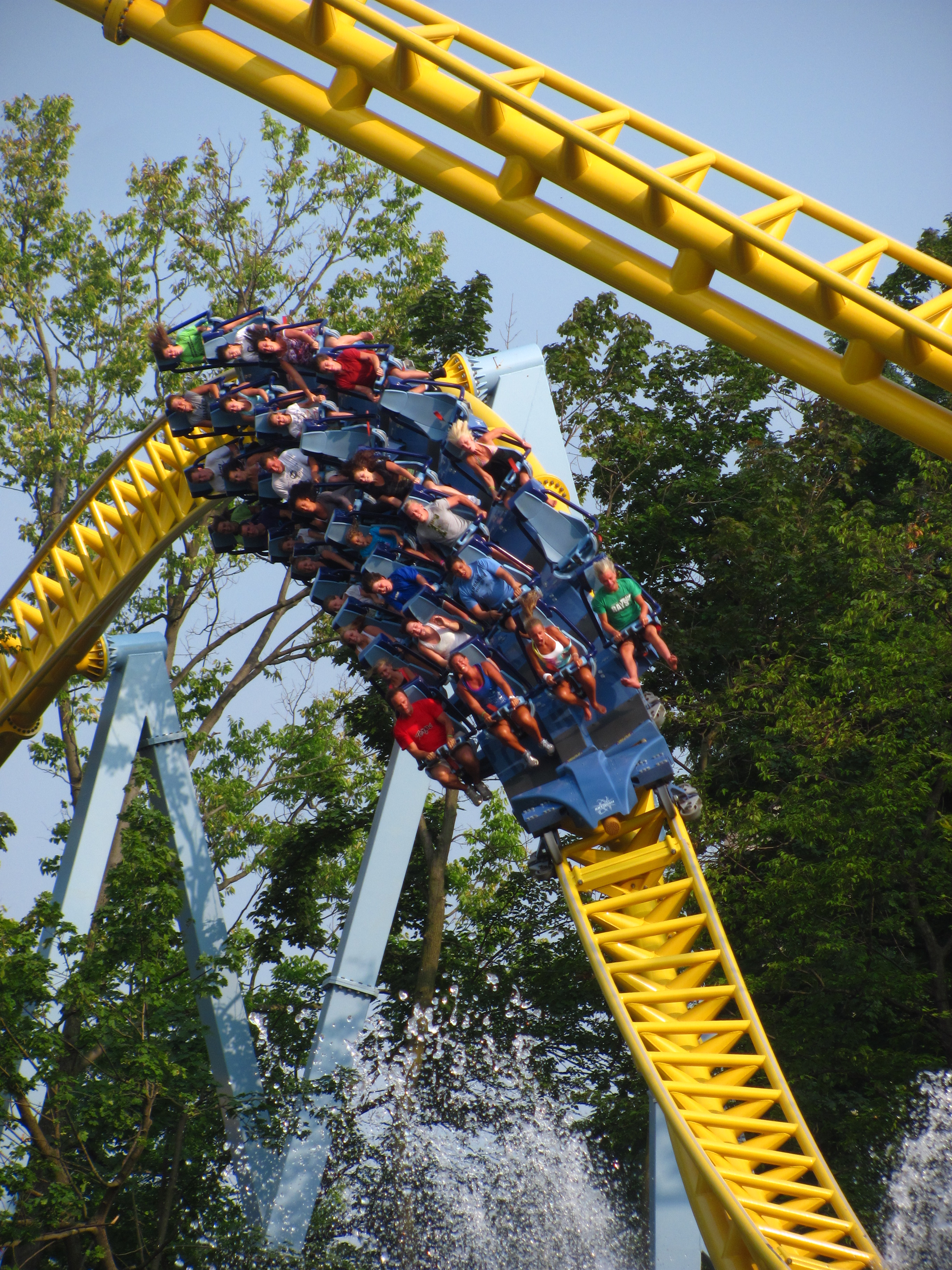
A train navigating an overbanked turn during Skyrush's opening year

The concept for what is now Skyrush dates to 2007, when Hershey Entertainment and Resorts Company, operator of Hersheypark in Derry Township, Pennsylvania, solicited designs from five roller coaster manufacturers. Although Hershey executives preferred a proposal by Swiss manufacturer Intamin, the plan would cost twice as much as Fahrenheit, a $12 million coaster that opened in 2008. Intamin influenced Hersheypark officials to build another attraction in the low-lying Hollow section of the park. On August 17, 2010, Hershey Entertainment presented plans to Derry Township officials for a new attraction reaching 212 ft (65 m) tall. The ride's construction required a zoning variance because it exceeded the township's 200 ft (61 m) height limit. Hersheypark officials also proposed erecting 32 supports inside an artificial pond and removing two dining structures in the Hollow, although they refused to provide further details about the new ride.

Hersheypark launched a marketing campaign, Attraction 2012, to promote what eventually became Skyrush. The Patriot-News wrote that the campaign included "fake Web pages, hidden messages, foreign languages and symbolism". Although Hersheypark publicly divulged little about the new ride, Attraction 2012 prompted extensive discussion on social media. Park officials submitted blueprints to Derry Township officials in April 2011, indicating that a roller coaster with a winding layout would be built in the Hollow section of Hersheypark. Work on the coaster had begun in early 2011, when workers began diverting Spring Creek, allowing the ride's concrete supports to be constructed. By June 2011, pieces for the as-yet-unnamed attraction had arrived on site. In conjunction with the Attraction 2012 campaign, Hershey Entertainment filed a trademark for the name "Skyrush" by July 2011.

The ride was officially announced on August 2, 2011. Skyrush was to be the first new roller coaster at Hersheypark since Fahrenheit in 2008. Skyrush was built on the site of the Sunken Gardens, a portion of Hersheypark that had not been open to the public since 1972. The Sunken Gardens was redesigned when Skyrush was constructed. The site was flooded in September 2011 during Tropical Storm Lee, which forced workers to remove and reinstall all of the concrete footings; this delayed construction by three weeks. The retaining walls along Spring Creek were rebuilt in conjunction with the Skyrush project, and the area received new landscaping. Because of a relatively mild winter in late 2011 and early 2012, construction crews were able to complete the ride before its scheduled opening on Memorial Day in 2012. The ride's construction employed up to 160 workers simultaneously.

Skyrush opened to the general public on May 26, 2012. The ride cost $25 million and was the 12th roller coaster at Hersheypark, as well as the third coaster that Intamin built at the park (after Storm Runner and Fahrenheit). With Skyrush's completion, Hersheypark rebranded the surrounding section of the park from "Comet Hollow" to "The Hollow". Park officials anticipated that the ride's opening would cause the park's attendance to increase. Skyrush was featured on a Good Morning America segment in June 2012. Skyrush was also Intamin's only Wing Coaster installation until 2016, when Flying Aces opened at Ferrari World Abu Dhabi.

In 2024, Hersheypark announced via their Instagram account that Skyrush would be receiving an updated logo, new seats, and new restraints for the 2024 season. In addition to the train upgrades, the station was "reimagined" with new lighting and sound effects.

== Ride experience ==
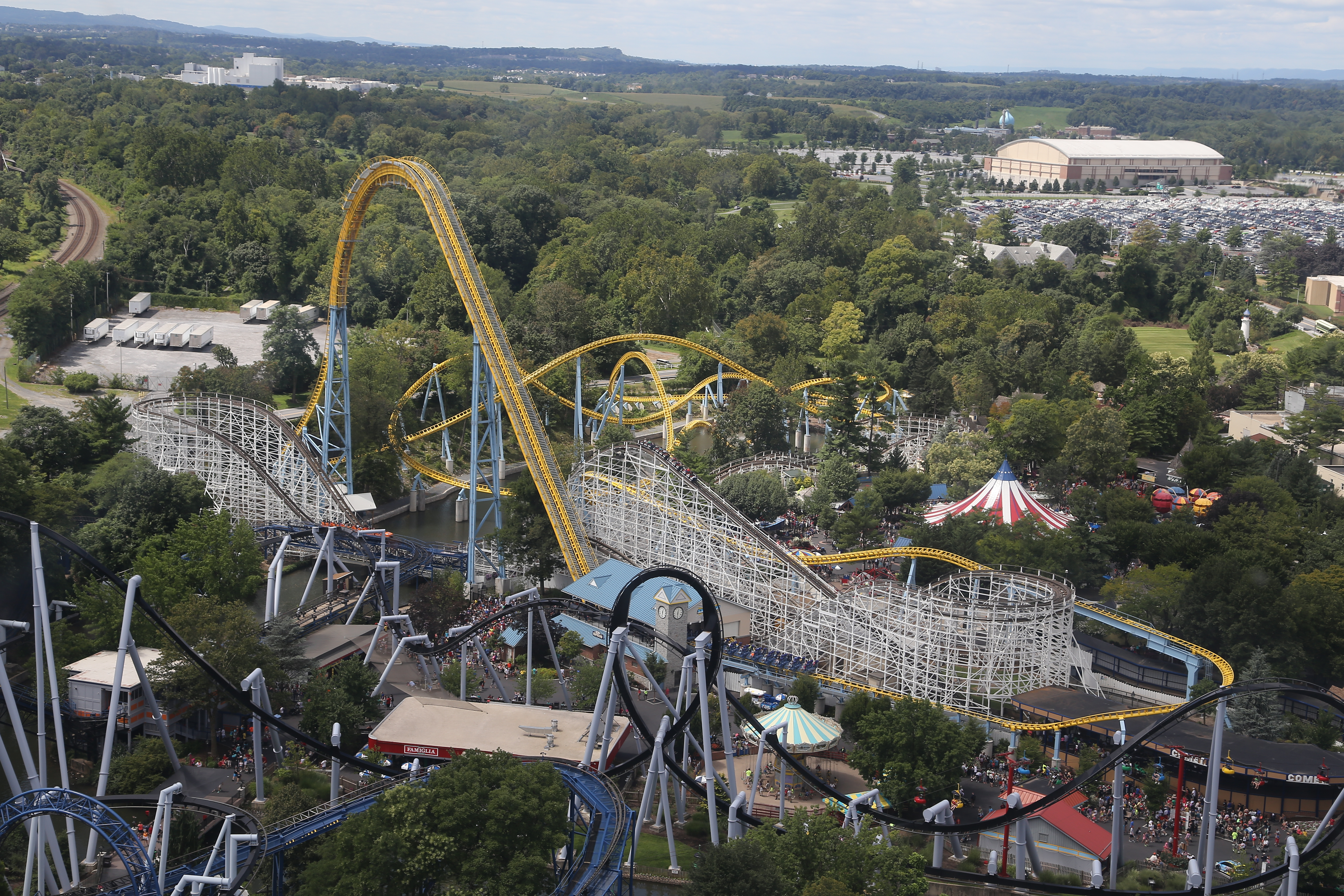
Skyrush viewed from Kissing Tower

Immediately after leaving the station, a cable lift carries the train to the top of the lift hill. The train then drops at an 85-degree angle, traveling through a large right hand turn and into a large airtime hill. The train next traverses a 270-degree helix before entering another airtime hill. After this, the train enters a right-hand turn that transitions into an overbanked turn. The ride drops and enters a quick transition into a highly-banked right turn, which transitions into a twisted airtime hill. After that, the train enters another airtime hill and a highly-banked turn to the left, crossing over Comet. The train enters the final brake run, then makes a right hand turn and returns to the station.

== Characteristics ==
Skyrush has yellow track and light blue support columns. The ride is 200 ft (61 m) tall and travels at up to 75 mph (121 km/h), with a 3,600 ft (1,100 m) long track. The lift hill is slanted at a 50-degree angle, with a cable lift that travels at 26 ft/s (480 m/min). The ride has a maximum drop of 212 ft (65 m). Its first drop has a vertical angle of 85 degrees; the train achieves its maximum g-force of 5.0 at the bottom of the first drop. There are four banked turns and five airtime hills, as well as a Stengel dive (a kind of banked turn named after the designer Werner Stengel). The course takes about 63 seconds to complete. There are maintenance bays next to the final brake run, where the trains can be taken off the track for maintenance. In addition, a pair of employees inspects the entire track every morning for about five hours.

The roller coaster was the first Wing Coaster installed by Intamin. It has two trains, each with 32 seats; there are eight cars in each train, each with one row of four seats. The trains are of extended width, with the two center seats in each row directly above the chassis and two additional seats that hang off the width of the chassis. The seats have lap bar restraints, which consist of flat plates that hold down the lower body of each rider; there are no over-the-shoulder restraints for each rider's upper body. Soon after the ride opened, guests criticized the lap bar restraints as overly painful because the restraints exert high amounts of pressure on the lower body. In 2024, the seats and restraints were replaced.

During the off-season (end of Hersheypark in the Dark and lasting through March of the following year), the queue area next to the station is disassembled. A crane then lifts the trains off the track and into the queue area, where two or three employees overhaul the trains.

== Reception ==
Jane Holahan of the Intelligencer Journal/Lancaster New Era wrote in 2012 that she was terrified of the ride, saying that "the ascent is a doozy, swiftly climbing up those 200 feet. None of that slow, creaky psychological terror on the Skyrush, it's all intense action from the very first second." Conversely, Mekado Murphy of The New York Times wrote: "The winged seats significantly change a rider's perspective and make the surrounding environment more a part of the coaster [...] At some of the most aggressive points in the ride, the lap restraint felt like the only thing preventing me from flying out of my seat." James Wesser wrote in 2022: "The out-of-control feeling along with the high g-forces gives me such an adrenaline boost and a way to scream my head off and let go of some stress. It also makes me feel like I am flying!" The same year, a reporter for LNP Always Lancaster wrote that, "unlike the beginning of every other coaster with an ascent at Hersheypark, Skyrush starts impossibly fast and stays that fast throughout the entire minute-long ride."

The original ride restraints that were used between 2012 and 2023 was frequently criticized by many Roller Coaster enthusiasts and general riders due to the potential pressure they caused to a rider's thighs while riding which could result in thigh pain. This resulted in some people using the derogatory nickname of "thighcrush" to describe the ride. The new ride restraints used since 2024 have been called more comfortable compared to the original restraints and have been praised by some reviewers.

=== Awards ===
In 2012, Skyrush was ranked by Amusement Today's Golden Ticket Awards as the fifth-best new ride (tied with OzIris at Parc Astérix), garnering six percent of the vote. In addition, every year between 2012 and 2015, Skyrush received a Golden Ticket Award for being of the 50 best steel roller coasters. It also received Golden Ticket Awards in every year between 2017 and 2019, as well as between 2021 and 2024. Skyrush did not rank in the Golden Ticket Awards in 2016, and no roller coasters received awards in 2020.

Golden Ticket Awards: Best New Ride for 2012
Ranking	5

Golden Ticket Awards: Top steel Roller Coasters
Year									1998	1999
Ranking									–	–
Year	2000	2001	2002	2003	2004	2005	2006	2007	2008	2009
Ranking	–	–	–	–	–	–	–	–	–	–
Year	2010	2011	2012	2013	2014	2015	2016	2017	2018	2019
Ranking	–	–	42	26	26 (tied)	25	–	24	30	27
Year	2020	2021	2022	2023	2024	2025	2026			
Ranking	N/A	33 (tied)	23	29	26	32	47			

== See also ==
- 2012 in amusement parks
