= Perturbation =

Perturbation or perturb may refer to:

- Perturbation theory, mathematical methods that give approximate solutions to problems that cannot be solved exactly
- Perturbation (geology), changes in the nature of alluvial deposits over time
- Perturbation (astronomy), alterations to an object's orbit (e.g., caused by gravitational interactions with other bodies)
- Perturbation theory (quantum mechanics), a set of approximation schemes directly related to mathematical perturbation for describing a complicated quantum system in terms of a simpler one
- Perturbation (biology), an alteration of the function of a biological system, induced by external or internal mechanisms
- Perturbation function, mathematical function which relates the primal and dual problems

== See also ==
- Annoy, annoyance
- Disturbance (disambiguation)
- Non-perturbative
