= Disturbance =

Disturbance and its variants may refer to:

== Math and science ==
- Disturbance (archaeology), any change to an archaeological site due to events after the site was laid down
- Disturbance (ecology), a temporary change in average environmental conditions that causes a pronounced change in an ecosystem
- Disturbance (geology), linear zone of faults and folds
- Disturbance (statistics), the deviation of the observed value from the (unobservable) true function value

== Arts and media ==
=== Film ===
- Disturbance (2014 film), a section, and former title, of the film Tales of the Supernatural
- Disturbance (1942 film), an Italian drama film
- Domestic Disturbance, a 2001 American psychological thriller film

=== Literature ===
- Disturbance: Surviving Charlie Hebdo, a 2018 book by Philippe Lançon

=== Music ===
- Disturbance (Concord Dawn album), 2001
- Disturbance (Test Dept. album), 2019
- "Disturbance" (BoA song), a 2013 digital single by South Korean singer BoA
- "Disturbance," a song by Eyehategod from the album Take as Needed for Pain
- "Disturbance", a song by God Is an Astronaut from the album All Is Violent, All Is Bright
- "Disturbance," a song by The Legendary Pink Dots from the 1991 album The Maria Dimension
- "Disturbance (Interlude)", a song by Tech N9ne from the 2001 album Absolute Power
- "Disturbance," a 1992 song by Scorpio Rising
- "Disturbance," a song by Oneiroid Psychosis from the 2001 album Dreams (With Pollutions When Virile)
- "The Disturbance", a 1967 song by The Move, B-side to debut 45, and released as a bonus track on the 1998 re-issue of The Move

== Other uses ==
- Disturbance theory, a political postulation
- Disturbing the peace, a crime
- Emotional disturbance

== See also ==
- Anomaly (disambiguation)
- Disruption (disambiguation)
- Turbulence (disambiguation)
