= Disruptor =

Disruptor may refer to:

- Disruptor (software), an open-source software technology
- Disruptor (Star Trek), a weapon in the Star Trek franchise
- Disruptor (video game), is a video game for the Sony PlayStation
- Disruptor Beam, a game company started by Jon Radoff
- Disruptor Conductor, an episode of CBC Docs POV
- Disruptor Records, an American record label
- Endocrine disruptor, chemicals that interfere with endocrine systems
- Photonic Disruptor, a model of the dazzler non-lethal directed radiation weapon
- Projected water disruptor, a type of bomb disposal equipment
- A catalyst of disruptive innovation
- A character in the 2025 film War of the Worlds

== See also ==
- Disruption
