= Trailblazer (roller coaster) =

Roller coaster at Hersheypark

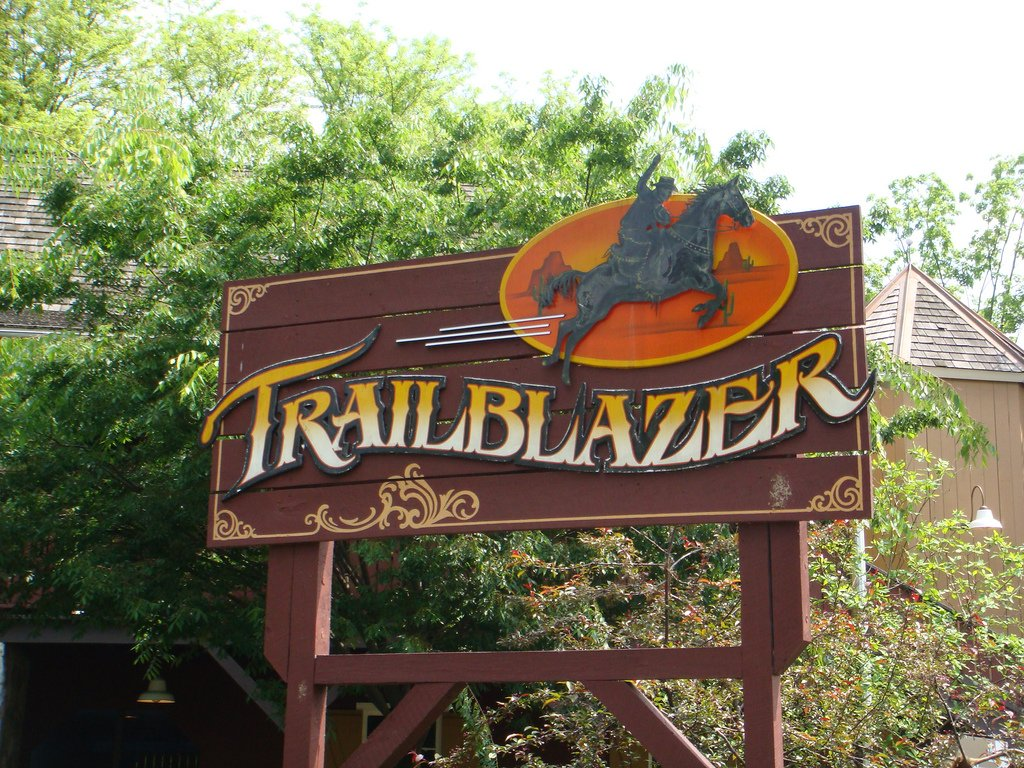
- Trailblazer's entrance

Hersheypark
- Location: Hersheypark
- Park section: Pioneer Frontier
- Coordinates: 40.289172°N 76.653478°W
- Status: Operating
- Opening date: May 18, 1974
- Cost: $975,000

General statistics
- Type: Steel
- Manufacturer: Arrow Development
- Model: Mine train
- Lift/launch system: Chain lift hill
- Height: 43 ft (13 m)
- Length: 1,600 ft (490 m)
- Speed: 35 mph (56 km/h)
- Duration: 1:15
- Height restriction: 36 in (91 cm)
- Trains: 2 trains with 5 cars; riders arranged 2 across in 3 rows for a total of 30 riders per train
- Trailblazer at RCDB

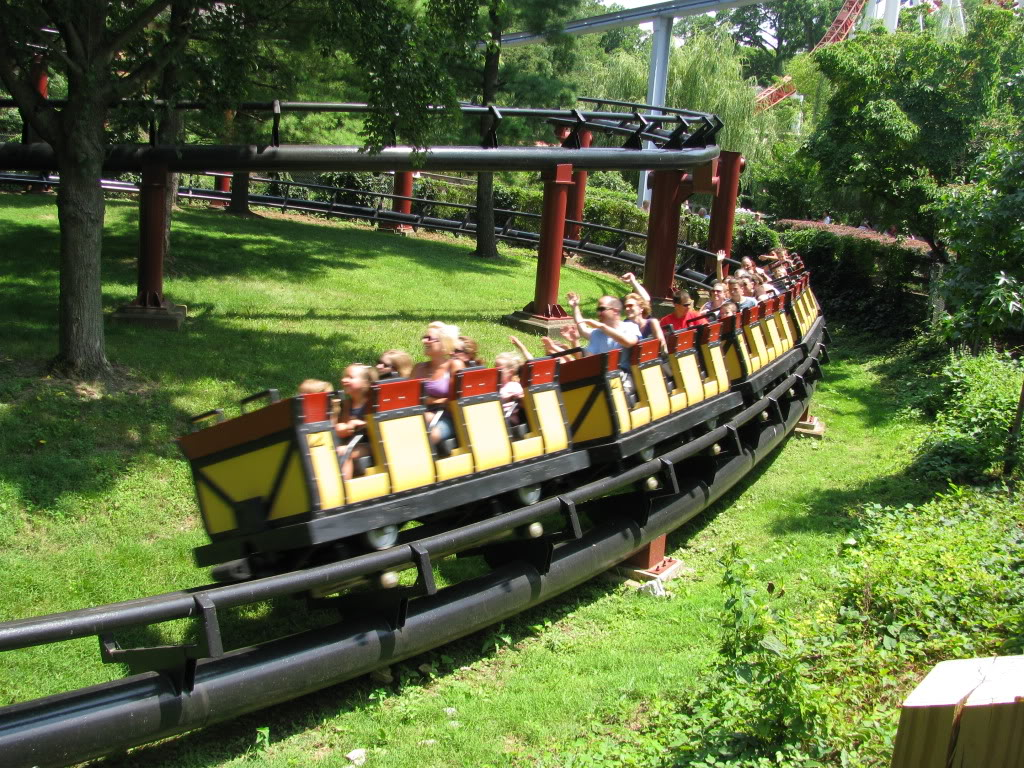
One of Trailblazer's trains exiting the helix

Trailblazer is a family roller coaster at Hersheypark in Hershey, Pennsylvania. It is located in the Pioneer Frontier section of Hersheypark, just below Storm Runner. The ride is notable for being the second-oldest operating coaster in the park, after the Comet.

== History ==
In 1970, Hersheypark hired R. Duell & Associates to reinvigorate the park, bringing fresh ideas and new attractions to put and keep Hersheypark on the map. With only one roller coaster in the park at the time, the Comet, there was a desire to add more and keep the park competing at a national level. After receiving several proposals for the new attraction, the park decided to partner with Arrow Development to create Trailblazer. The ride was purchased on April 30, 1973, at a cost of $975,000. The ride was constructed in what is now the Pioneer Frontier section of the park and opened to the public on May 18, 1974.

Based on an illustration of the ride in a 1974 Souvenir book printed before the coaster was finalized, it is speculated that two lift hills may have been a part of a different proposed layout.

The ride received two brand new trains in 2003 built by Premier Rides. The main difference with the new cars were individual lap bars for each seat, rather than the single lap bar for each pair of seats.

== Ride experience ==
Exiting the station, the train descends a small dip before turning left. After passing through the storage transfer track, the train makes a slight curve to the left into the lift hill. After cresting the lift, the train momentarily flattens out, then begins a slight descending curve to the right, passing over part of the queue line for Storm Runner. After passing under the lift, the train heads heads straight, then into a slight curve to the left, followed by a small hill into the mid-course brake run. The train then traverses down another drop, curving to the left and passing under the track of the Dry Gulch Railroad. After another slight upwards hill, the train straightens out, then curves right into a descending double helix. After exiting the helix, the train continues on an upward sloping right hand turn into the final brake run before returning to the station.
