= Turbulence (disambiguation) =

Turbulence is a phenomenon involving the irregular motion of air and fluids, studied in fluid dynamics.

Turbulence may also refer to:

== Physics and technology ==
- Clear-air turbulence, a high-altitude aviation hazard
- Wake turbulence, forms behind an aircraft as it passes through the air
- Wave turbulence, a set of waves deviated far from thermal equilibrium

== Movies and TV ==
- Turbulence (U.S. film series)
  - Turbulence (1997 film), an action film
  - Turbulence 2: Fear of Flying, a 1999 direct-to-video action film
  - Turbulence 3: Heavy Metal, a 2001 direct-to-video action film
- Turbulence (2000 film), a Brazilian film
- Turbulence (2011 film), a British film
- Turbulence, a 2016 Lifetime Movie Network television film
- Turbulence (2025 film), an American-British film
- "Turbulence" (CSI: NY episode)
- "Turbulence", a season 8 episode of Smallville

== Literature ==
- Turbulence (Mark novel), a 2005 children's book by Jan Mark
- Turbulence, a 2010 superhero novel by Samit Basu
- Turbulence (Foden novel), a 2009 novel by Giles Foden
- Turbulence (Szalay novel), a 2018 novel by David Szalay

== Music ==
- Turbulence (musician) (born 1980), Jamaican reggae musician
- Turbulence (Aviator album)
- Turbulence (Steve Howe album)
- "Turbulence", a song from Warren Zevon's 1989 album, Transverse City
- Turbulence, a 2007 album by Monoral
- "Turbulence", a single from Bowling for Soup's 2011 album, Fishin' for Woos
- "Turbulence" (song), a 2011 song by Laidback Luke, Steve Aoki, and Lil Jon

== Other uses ==
- Turbulence.org, an arts organization
- Turbulence (NSA), a surveillance and cyberwarfare system
- Turbulence, a 2005 proposed roller coaster at Hersheypark in Hershey, Pennsylvania, cancelled before coaster was constructed
- Turbulence (roller coaster), a 2015 roller coaster at Adventureland in East Farmingdale, New York
