= Disruption =

Disruption, disruptive, or disrupted may refer to:

== Business ==
- Creative disruption, disruption concept in a creative context, introduced in 1992 by TBWA's chairman Jean-Marie Dru
- Disruptive innovation, Clayton Christensen's theory of industry disruption by new technology or products

== Psychology and sociology ==
- Disruptive behavior disorders, a class of mental health disorders
- Disruptive physician, a physician whose obnoxious behaviour upsets patients or other staff
- Social disruption, a radical alteration, transformation, dysfunction or breakdown of social life

== Arts and Entertainment ==
- The Disruption, a 1996 EP by Cursive
- "The Disruption" (Succession), TV episode

== Other uses ==
- Cell disruption is a method or process in cell biology for releasing biological molecules from inside a cell
- Disrupted: My Misadventure in the Start Up Bubble, a 2016 book by Daniel Lyons
- Disruption (adoption) is also the term for the cancellation of an adoption of a child before it is legally completed
- Disruption (of schema), in the field of computer genetic algorithms
- Disruption of 1843, the divergence of the Free Church of Scotland from the Church of Scotland
- Disruption, a method of disabling an explosive device by using projected water disruptors

== See also ==
- Disruptor (disambiguation)
- Disturbance (disambiguation)
