= Fahrenheit (roller coaster) =

Roller coaster at Hersheypark

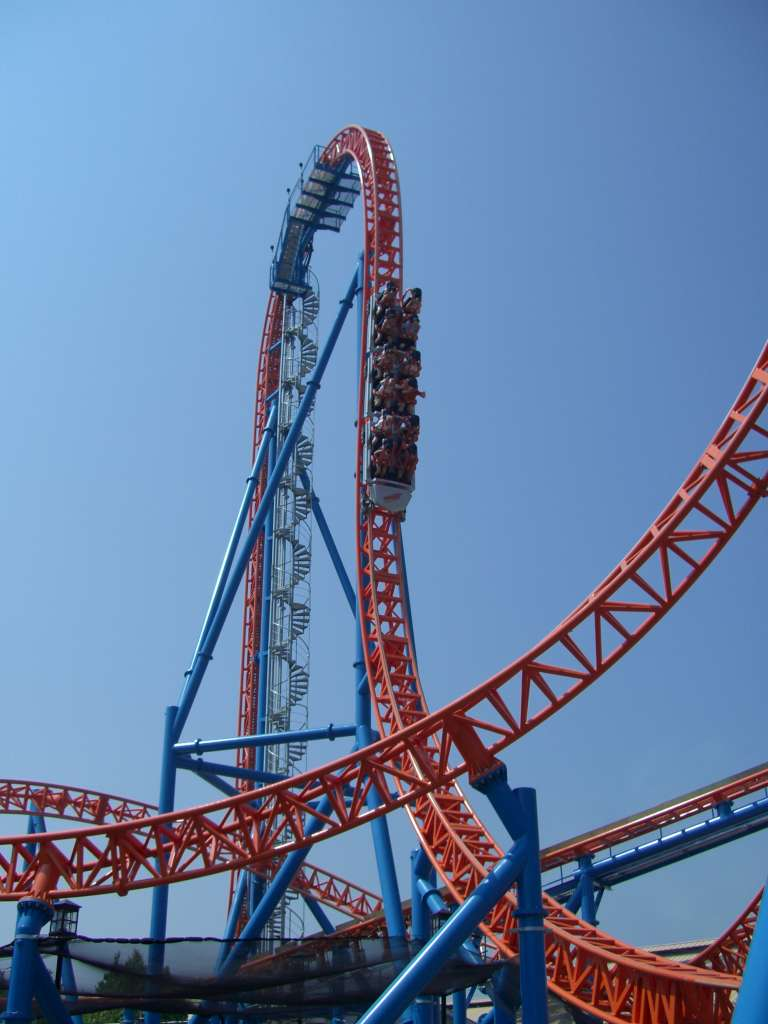
- Fahrenheit's lift hill and first drop

Hersheypark
- Location: Hersheypark
- Park section: Pioneer Frontier
- Coordinates: 40.291037°N 76.655204°W
- Status: Operating
- Opening date: May 24, 2008
- Cost: US$12,100,000

General statistics
- Type: Steel
- Manufacturer: Intamin
- Designer: Werner Stengel
- Lift/launch system: Vertical chain lift
- Height: 121 ft (37 m)
- Length: 2,700 ft (820 m)
- Speed: 58 mph (93 km/h)
- Inversions: 6
- Duration: 1:25
- Max vertical angle: 97°
- Capacity: 850 riders per hour
- Restraint style: Over-the-shoulder harness
- Height restriction: 54 in (137 cm)
- Trains: 3 trains with 3 cars; riders arranged 2 across in 2 rows for a total of 12 riders per train
- Fahrenheit at RCDB

Fahrenheit is a steel roller coaster at Hersheypark in Hershey, Pennsylvania, United States. Located in the Pioneer Frontier section of the park, the roller coaster was manufactured by Intamin and opened on May 24, 2008. It features six inversions and became the steepest roller coaster in the world when it opened with its first drop of 97 degrees. Fahrenheit briefly held the record until Steel Hawg at Indiana Beach, which featured a 111-degree drop, opened several weeks later on July 5. Fahrenheit is also one of the few coasters in the world to feature a Norwegian Loop.

== History ==
Planning for Fahrenheit began in late 2006, eighteen months before the ride was to open. Fahrenheit was announced in a Hersheypark press release on September 27, 2007. Typically, the park built a major attraction every two years, but the previous large attraction, the Boardwalk at Hersheypark, had opened earlier the same year. The new coaster replaced the Western Chute-Out, which had operated since 1988 or 1991. The Western Chute-Out's ridership had declined following the opening of the Boardwalk at Hersheypark, which had contained five water attractions, and demolition of the Western Chute-Out began in early September 2007. Ahead of Fahrenheit's opening, Hersheypark launched a viral marketing campaign to promote the project.

The construction of Fahrenheit caused the opening of the Boardwalk at Hersheypark to be delayed for the 2008 season. Fahrenheit opened on May 24, 2008. The ride cost an estimated $12.1 million. Fahrenheit was Hersheypark's 11th roller coaster and was one of two new attractions for the 2008 season, the other being the Howler, a spinning flat ride adjacent to Fahrenheit. To promote the new rides, Hersheypark launched a 14-week mobile tour, stopping at 30 locations across the Mid-Atlantic and Northeastern United States.

== Ride experience ==
The train exits the station and makes a right turn and climbs the 121-foot-tall (37 m) vertical lift hill. Cresting the hill, the train falls into the 97-degree drop. At the bottom of the drop is an on-ride camera. The train ascends into a "Norwegian loop", rolling to the left and dives through a half loop down to the ground. The train soars up and rolls out to the left as it exits the Norwegian loop. Upon its exit, the train dives down and to the left into a cobra roll. Following the cobra roll, the train rolls into two consecutive corkscrews and a banked turn to the right through the lift hill. Exiting the turn, the train flies over a small airtime hill and through a wide low to the ground left-banked turn up into a slanted downward final brake run. The train makes a left and right turn before entering into the station.

== Characteristics ==
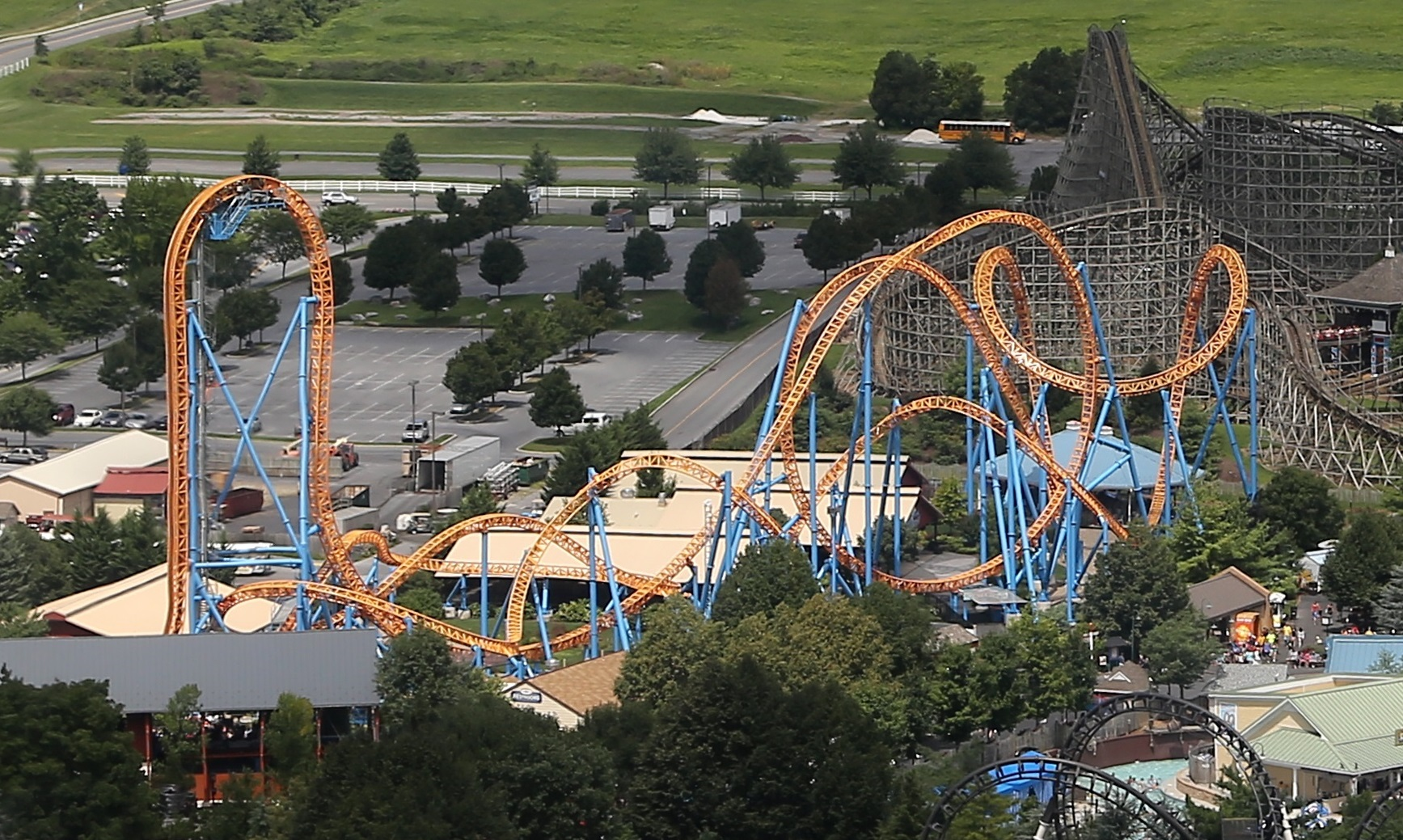
Fahrenheit viewed from Kissing Tower

Described as a "vertical lift inverted loop coaster", Fahrenheit was manufactured by Intamin. Fahrenheit features a 121-foot vertical lift as well as six inversions, airtime hills and high-speed banked curves, cobra roll, including a 97-degree drop on the first hill. In addition, there is a 107-foot-tall (33 m) Norwegian loop, which has two inversions (a dive loop followed by an Immelmann inversion), rather than the single inversion found on standard vertical loop.

The track is about 2,700 feet (820 m) long, and the ride has a capacity of 850 riders per hour. Riders travel at a maximum speed of 58 miles per hour (93 km/h), traversing the course in 85 seconds. Each train consists of three cars, which each seat four people.

At the time of Fahrenheit's construction, it was the steepest roller coaster in the United States. This record has since been surpassed by Steel Hawg at Indiana Beach, which features a 111-degree drop.

| Preceded by Maverick; 95° | World's steepest roller coaster May 24, 2008 – July 5, 2008; 97° | Succeeded by Steel Hawg; 111° |
