= Emotional disturbance =

Emotional disturbance may refer to:

- Emotional and behavioral disorders, most frequently used in an educational context
- Mental disorders, especially those involving emotions or emotional disorders, including mood disorders
- Emotional trauma
- Emotional dysregulation
- Emotional distress
- Emotional lability
- Acute stress reaction, also known as "emotional shock"
- Emotional stress
- Mental distress
- Mania and depression
- Anxiety, fear, extreme sadness or anger, and other emotions that may disturb the mental state of an individual
