= Hersheypark =

Theme park in Hershey, Pennsylvania, US

- Previously known as Hershey Park (1906–1970)

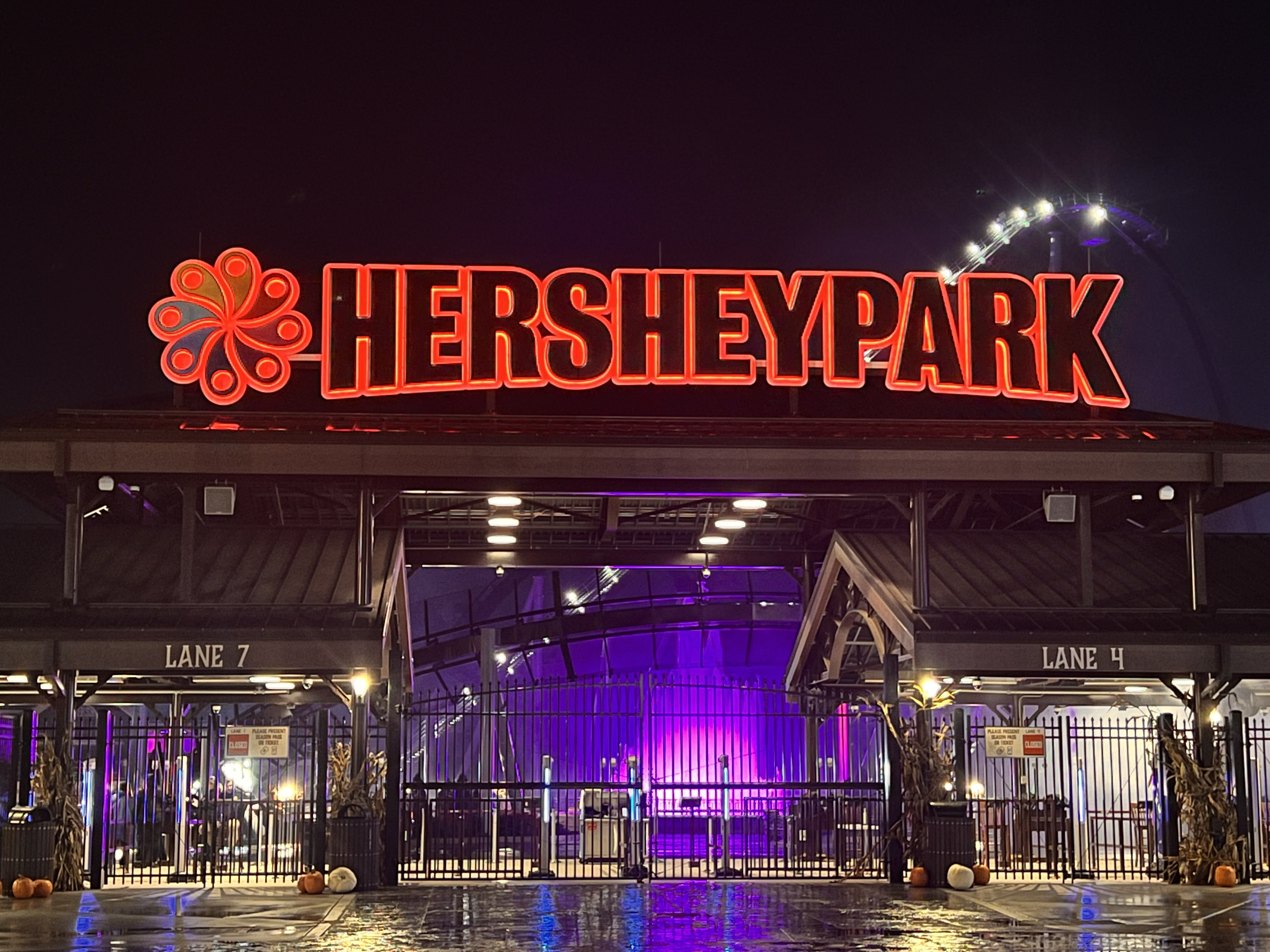
- Hersheypark Entrance
- Interactive map of Hersheypark
- Location: Hershey, Pennsylvania, U.S.
- Coordinates: 40°17′17″N 76°39′25″W
- Status: Operating
- Opened: May 30, 1906; 120 years ago (as Hershey Park)
- Owner: Hershey Entertainment and Resorts Company
- General manager: Vikki Hultquist
- Theme: Hershey's Chocolate, Pennsylvania's heritage
- Slogan: Hersheypark Happy
- Operating season: Spring Weekends (April - late May); Late May - early January
- Attendance: 3,000,000 (2024)
- Area: 121 acres (49 ha)

Attractions
- Total: 73 (as of 2025)
- Roller coasters: 14
- Water rides: 15
- Other rides: 44
- Website: www.hersheypark.com

Hersheypark (known as Hershey Park until 1970) is a family theme park in Hershey, Pennsylvania, United States, about fifteen miles (25 km) east of Harrisburg, and 95 miles (155 km) west of Philadelphia. The park was founded in 1906 by Milton S. Hershey as a leisure park for the employees of the Hershey Chocolate Company. It is wholly and privately owned by Hershey Entertainment and Resorts Company. Hersheypark has won several awards, including the Applause Award.

The park opened its first roller coaster in 1923, the Wild Cat, an early Philadelphia Toboggan Company coaster. In 1970, it began a redevelopment plan, which led to new rides, an expansion, and its renaming. The 1970s brought the SooperDooperLooper, an early complete-circuit looping roller coaster, as well as a 330-foot-tall (100 m) observation tower, the Kissing Tower. Beginning in the mid-1980s, the park rapidly expanded. Between 1991 and 2008, it added eight roller coasters and the "Boardwalk at Hersheypark" water park. As of 2020, the park covers over 121 acres (49 ha), containing 76 rides and attractions, as well as a zoo called "ZooAmerica". Adjacent to the park is Hershey's Chocolate World, a visitors' center attraction that contains shops, restaurants, and a chocolate factory-themed tour ride, where visitors can get their picture taken and receive a piece of chocolate at the end of the ride.

Prior to the reduction in worldwide theme park attendance due to the COVID-19 pandemic, the park saw an average attendance of over 3.3 million visitors each year. In 2020, the park hosted 1.7 million visitors. It is the most visited theme park in Pennsylvania and the ninth most visited theme park in North America, as well as the largest theme park in the United States outside of Virginia, Ohio, Florida, or California.

== History ==
In 1903, Milton S. Hershey, founder of the Hershey Chocolate Company, surveyed the town that would become Hershey. Included in his plans was a site along Spring Creek that would be suitable for a leisure park for Hershey employees. In 1905, a bridge was built over Spring Creek, and a pavilion was built on the hill that overlooked it. While the bridge was able to be constructed, the land on the banks of Spring Creek, from Derry Church to Union Deposit, and areas further north of the creek (including the area currently occupied by Hersheypark Arena and Stadium) was then owned by J.H. Nissley. In February 1906, Hershey purchased all but two tracts of land, near Union Deposit, from Nissley. In early spring, the Hershey baseball club staked out an area for a baseball field; a baseball diamond, a track surrounding the field, and grandstands were built. The first game was played on May 5, which was a 4–0 loss to Felton Athletic Club. This is also noted as the first open-air event in Hershey.

=== Name ===
On Wednesday, May 30, 1906, Hershey's park was opened to the public and formally called Hershey Park. The festivities included a baseball game, in which Hershey defeated the Crescent Club of Harrisburg by a score of 13–1. Music was performed by the recently formed Hershey Band and other events were held on park grounds. Prior to that time, the park had been called various unofficial names, including "West-end" Park and Hershey's Park, which (despite being a popular, and grammatically correct, choice) was picked over in order to combine the words Hershey and Park. In 1970, after more than 60 years of operation, park management decided to redevelop the park into a theme park. The name was changed to Hersheypark in 1971, and it has operated under that name ever since.

=== Amusement rides and attractions ===
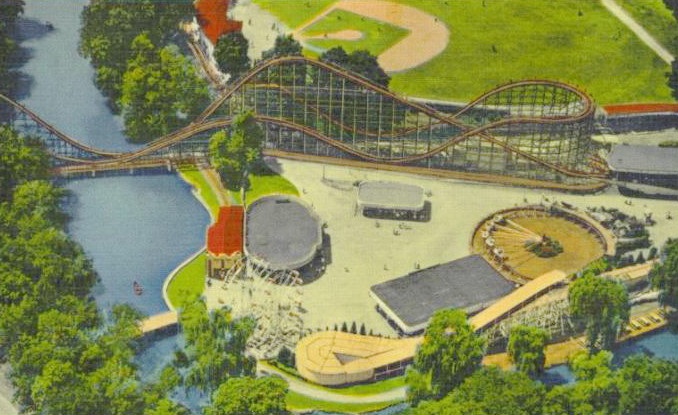
A view of Hersheypark's amusement center circa 1950

The first ride was added to the park in 1908 – a Herschell-Spillman carousel often referred to as the "Merry-Go-Round" or "Carrousel". This was followed in 1910 with the addition of the Miniature Railroad, which remained in operation until the end of the 1971 season. The park has operated a roller coaster ride continuously since 1923, a variety of boat rides on Spring Creek, and six dark rides, three of which were fun houses. The park added its first two kiddie rides in 1926, a kiddie Ferris wheel and Airplane Swing. Hersheypark has built over 160 rides over its nearly 120 year history. The park currently has 76 rides and water attractions.

==== Roller coasters ====
The park added its first roller coaster in 1923, the Wild Cat, for the town of Hershey's twentieth anniversary, which operated until 1945. It was replaced by the park's second wooden roller coaster, Comet, in 1946. Between then and 1996, the park added six roller coasters, including SooperdooperLooper, the first complete-circuit, modern-day looping steel roller coaster on the East Coast of the United States, which opened in 1977. In 1996, Hersheypark added its third wooden roller coaster (Wild Cat and Comet being the first two), naming it Wildcat (initially The Wildcat) after the original Wild Cat. Between the 1996 addition of Wildcat and 2016, the park added nine roller coasters. This included the parks first indoor roller coaster Laff Trakk in 2015, hypercoaster Skyrush in 2012, Fahrenheit in 2008, the launch coaster Storm Runner in 2004, and the inverted coaster Great Bear in 1998.

Of the coasters that the park has had, only five are no longer in the park: a twin roller coaster called Toboggan (also called Twin Towers Toboggan or Twin Toboggans) which was located in Carousel Circle; a water coaster called Roller Soaker which was in Midway America and later The Boardwalk a kiddie coaster with an oval track called Mini-Comet; the 1996 Wildcat; and the original Wild Cat. The station of the Wild Cat was located in the Minetown area where the Convoy ride is currently, with most of the out-and-back layout/structure built along the north side of Spring Creek between the base of Storm Runner's first drop and the station for Trailblazer.

Candymonium holds the park record for being the tallest, fastest, and longest (by track length) roller coaster at Hersheypark. The most recent roller coaster to open at Hersheypark is Wildcat's Revenge, which replaced Wildcat in 2023.

==== Pools ====
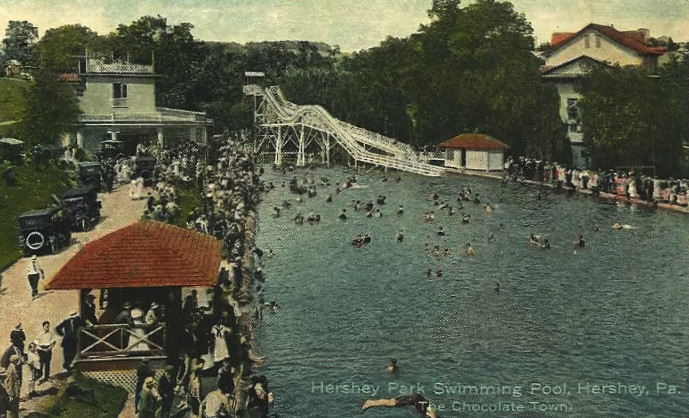
Hersheypark's second pool, circa 1924–1928

The park has had several pools, the first located next to Spring Creek in Comet Hollow, the area themed as The Hollow as of 2018. The first pool operated from 1908 until 1911, which included a toboggan-slide ride called Shoot-the-Chutes. This pool was replaced by a cement pool which opened in 1912 and remained in use through the 1928 season.

That pool was replaced by a new pool complex on the western edge of the park, which included a large bathhouse, one large pool and a smaller pool, as well as a beach-like area and a lighthouse. It operated until 1971, when it was closed at the start of the Hersheypark theme park conversion renovation.

Hersheypark did not add another pool until 2007 when The Boardwalk at Hersheypark opened. It is a small wave pool for children, called Bayside Pier. That was followed by the addition of a much larger wave pool, called The Shore, which opened in 2009.

=== Themed areas of the park ===
Hersheypark developed a number of themed areas, the first being Carousel Circle, Der Deitsch Platz, and Animal Garden in 1972, followed by Tower Plaza in 1975, Pioneer Frontier in 1985, Midway America in 1996, as well as The Boardwalk at Hersheypark in 2007. In 2014, Hersheypark merged several theme areas – Tudor Square, Rhineland, Founder's Circle and Music Box Way, became an area called Founder's Way, while the coal mining region themed area Minetown was re-themed as Kissing Tower Hill. The themed areas had featured different music to each area, such as polka-style songs being played in Der Deitsch Platz and Carousel Circle, country music being played in the Pioneer Frontier themed area, the Beach Boys being played near Tidal Force and later in The Boardwalk, as well as Ragtime and jazz music being played in Midway America. However, the music was phased into being the same across the park, except in The Boardwalk and Pioneer Frontier. However, in 2026, the music in Founders Way was changed to smooth jazz-style music, while Midway America was changed to have Motown play in the area at the same time. Both of these changes were to coincide with America 250. In the summer of 2020, Hersheypark opened a new themed area called Hershey's Chocolatetown, which included a new entrance plaza, ice cream parlor, flagship retail store, and a Bolliger & Mabillard hyper coaster named Candymonium. This includes the first ever Starbucks inside the park.

== Attractions ==
=== Rides ===
Hersheypark currently has 73 rides and water attractions in operation across 7 themed regions. (ZooAmerica is the eighth themed region.) The oldest ride currently in Hersheypark is the Carrousel, a Philadelphia Toboggan Company built ride in 1919 and installed in Hersheypark in 1945. The newest ride is Twizzlers Twisted Gravity, built by S&S Worldwide, opened in 2025.

Hersheypark also has a waterpark called The Boardwalk at Hersheypark, featuring 15 water attractions, and included with a daily admission ticket. The Boardwalk was created in 2007. In 2018, Breakers Edge Water Coaster and Whitecap Racer were installed. It was most recently expanded in 2026 when a new water play area was installed.

==== Height categories ====
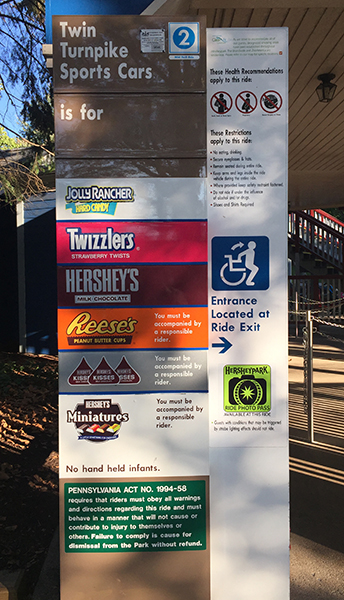
This is a height measurement board at the entrance of the Twin Turnpike Sports Cars ride in Hersheypark.

Hersheypark uses Hershey Company products as names for each height range to determine who can ride which rides. It was introduced in 1993 and updated in 1995, 2001, and 2005.

All measurements are in inches:

Category	Range	Notes
Miniatures	Under 3 feet (91 cm)	Newest height category; created in 2005.
Kisses	3–3 1/2 feet (91–107 cm)	The first category that can go on select coasters.
Reese's	3 1/2–4 ft (107–122 cm)	They can go on most family rides and kiddie rides.
Hershey's	4–4 1/2 ft (122–137 cm)	They can go on most rides except one kiddie ride and a handful of higher rated thrill rides.
Twizzler	4 1/2–5 ft (137–152 cm)	Riders can go on any ride unsupervised, if they choose to. Cannot ride most kiddie rides.
Jolly Rancher	5 feet (152 cm) and above	Previously Cookies 'N' Creme and originally Bar None.

==== Ride Rating System ====
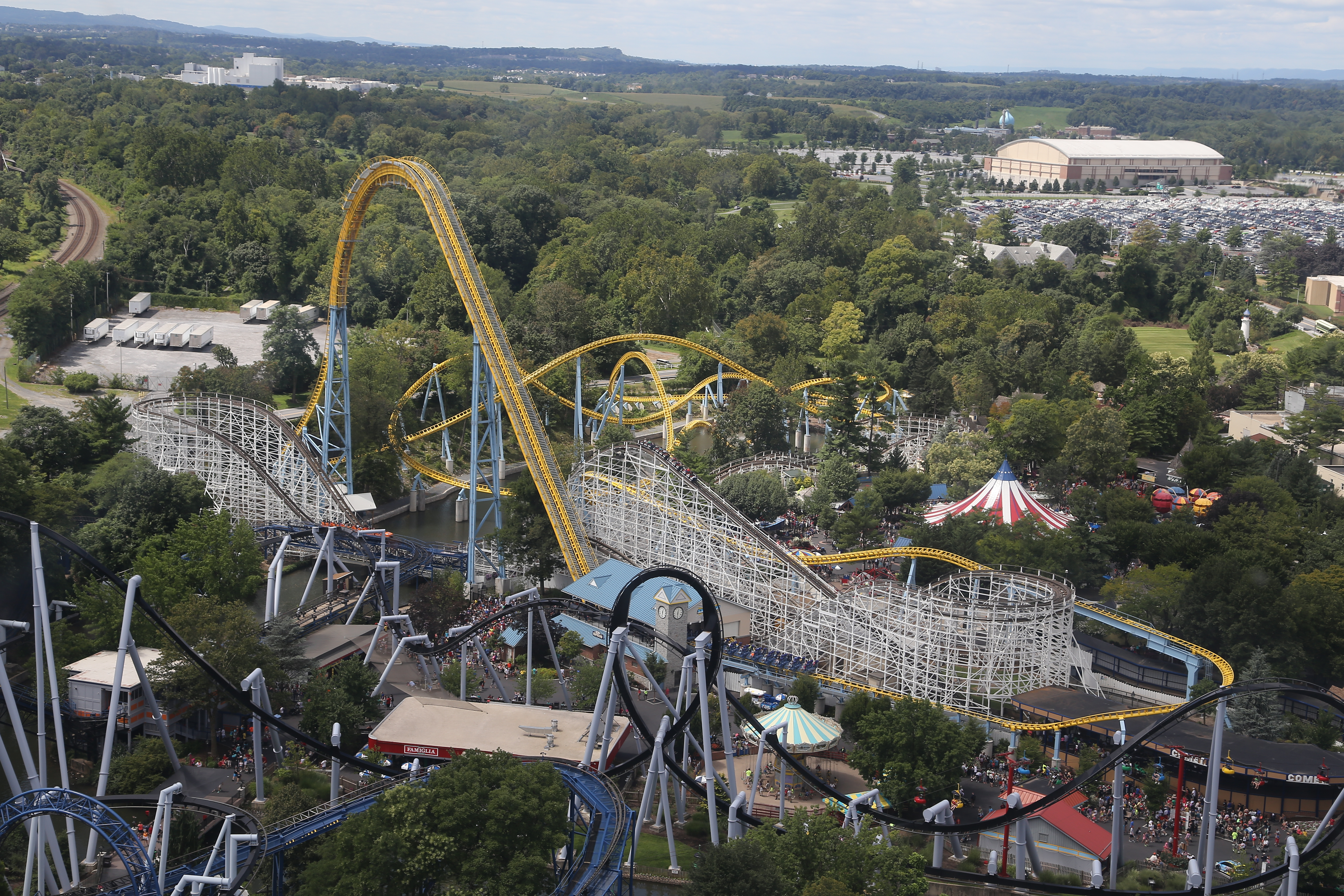
Skyrush, Great Bear, and Comet viewed from Kissing Tower

Hersheypark uses a ride ratings system to alert guests to the aggressiveness of the ride. The ratings for each ride are as follows:

Rating	Name	Description
1	Children's Ride	This is a low-speed, gentle ride intended for young children and may accommodate chaperones where permitted.
2	Mild Thrill Ride	This is a low to medium speed ride with expected changes in elevation and speed. This ride may require some rider body control and is not intended for unaccompanied toddlers or very young children.
3	Moderate Thrill Ride	This is a medium speed ride where riders may experience unexpected changes in elevation and speed. This ride may contain moderate twists, turns, bumps, spins, and loops, and may require some rider body control.
4	High Thrill Ride	This is a fast-paced ride experience with unexpected changes in speed, direction, and/or elevation. This ride may contain significant twists, turns, bumps, spins, and loops, and requires rider full body control.
5	Aggressive Thrill Ride	This is a high-speed experience. Riders will experience many unexpected, rapid changes in speed, direction, and/or elevation and requires rider full body control. This ride is not recommended for guests with physical, cognitive, and/or medical limitations.

=== Entertainment ===
Hersheypark features a number of entertainment shows in a number of venues including Hersheypark Aquatheatre and the Music Box Theatre, as well as strolling shows throughout the park. 12 resident shows are offered along with Spring, Summer, Halloween, and Christmas seasonal shows. From November to January, the park features a holiday-themed event called Hersheypark's Christmas Candylane.

=== Dining ===
There are facilities for accommodating particular dietary needs, including a kosher restaurant (Central PA's Kosher Mart) and a variety of restaurants offering gluten-free rolls and bread. Groups can pre-arrange catering in one of six private picnic areas inside the park. Signs are posted prohibiting guests from bringing in outside food and drink. A casual sit-down restaurant called Hersheypark Place (formerly Tudor Grill, Pippin's, and Tudor Rose Restaurant) was located just outside the park from 1973 to 2018. It was replaced by The Chocolatier restaurant, Milton's Ice Cream Parlor, and The Sweeterie Confectionery Kitchen in 2021 after the current main entrance was built. They were originally slated to open in 2020 but were delayed due to the COVID-19 pandemic. Among other dining options are brand name locations such as Chickie's & Pete's, added for the 2014 season and a Chick-fil-A restaurant (closed Sundays), added for the 2017 season. Subway has been in multiple locations in the park dating back to the 1980s.

Former dining options include the Chicken House (1966–1976), Minetown Vittles (1977–1998), and brand name locations such as Welch's Refreshment Pavilion (1976–1980s), Taco Bell (1992–mid-2000s), and Moe's Southwest Grill (2015 - 2024).

=== ZooAmerica ===
Also included in the price of admission is access to ZooAmerica. It is open year-round and offers 11 acres of land to visit and walk throughout. It is smoke-free, as ZooAmerica houses "more than 200 animals from five regions of North America" and offers tours, birthday parties, and informational programs at varying costs, even having their own individual seasonal pass.

== Themed regions ==
Hersheypark is made up of seven themed areas, starting with Hershey's Chocolatetown, an area which spans from outside the main gate, to around the area of the former Sky Ride station. From there, it becomes Founder's Way, which leads to a junction where three sections – Kissing Tower Hill, The Hollow and Pioneer Frontier – meet and make up the central and southern end of the park, while two sections, Midway America and The Boardwalk, make up the northern end of the park.

=== Hershey's Chocolatetown ===
On October 3, 2018, Hershey Entertainment and Resorts revealed its "biggest announcement ever" – a new section of the park called Hershey's Chocolatetown. It features Candymonium, a Bolliger & Mabillard hypercoaster; the Chocolatier themed restaurant, bar, and patio; the Sweeterie confectionery kitchen; as well as a 10,000 square-foot flagship boutique store, Hersheypark Supply Co, Milton's Ice Cream Parlor, a 2,200-square-foot Starbucks store and a kettle corn location that is the largest in Hersheypark. Chocolatetown also features a unique Hershey's Kisses fountain.

The project cost an estimated $150 million, making this the largest capital expense in the park's history. The new area sits on 23 acres (9.3 ha) of land previously unoccupied by Hersheypark. Along with the expansion, Hershey announced plans to introduce a new entrance to the park, which will lead directly to the new section. The park's Carrousel was relocated from Founder's Way to Chocolatetown. The expansion, along with the rest of the park, opened on July 3, 2020, after being delayed due to the COVID-19 pandemic. The Chocolatier Restaurant, The Sweeterie, and Milton's Ice Cream Parlor were rescheduled to open in 2021. All three locations as well as the Hersheypark Supply Co. main gift shop are open year-round even when the park is closed.

It is now the first area one encounters when entering the park. It replaced the former Tudor Square and Rhineland buildings that were built during the park's retheming in the 1970s. There are only a few remaining buildings from the Rhineland section towards the back of the area, where it becomes Founder's Way.

=== Founder's Way ===
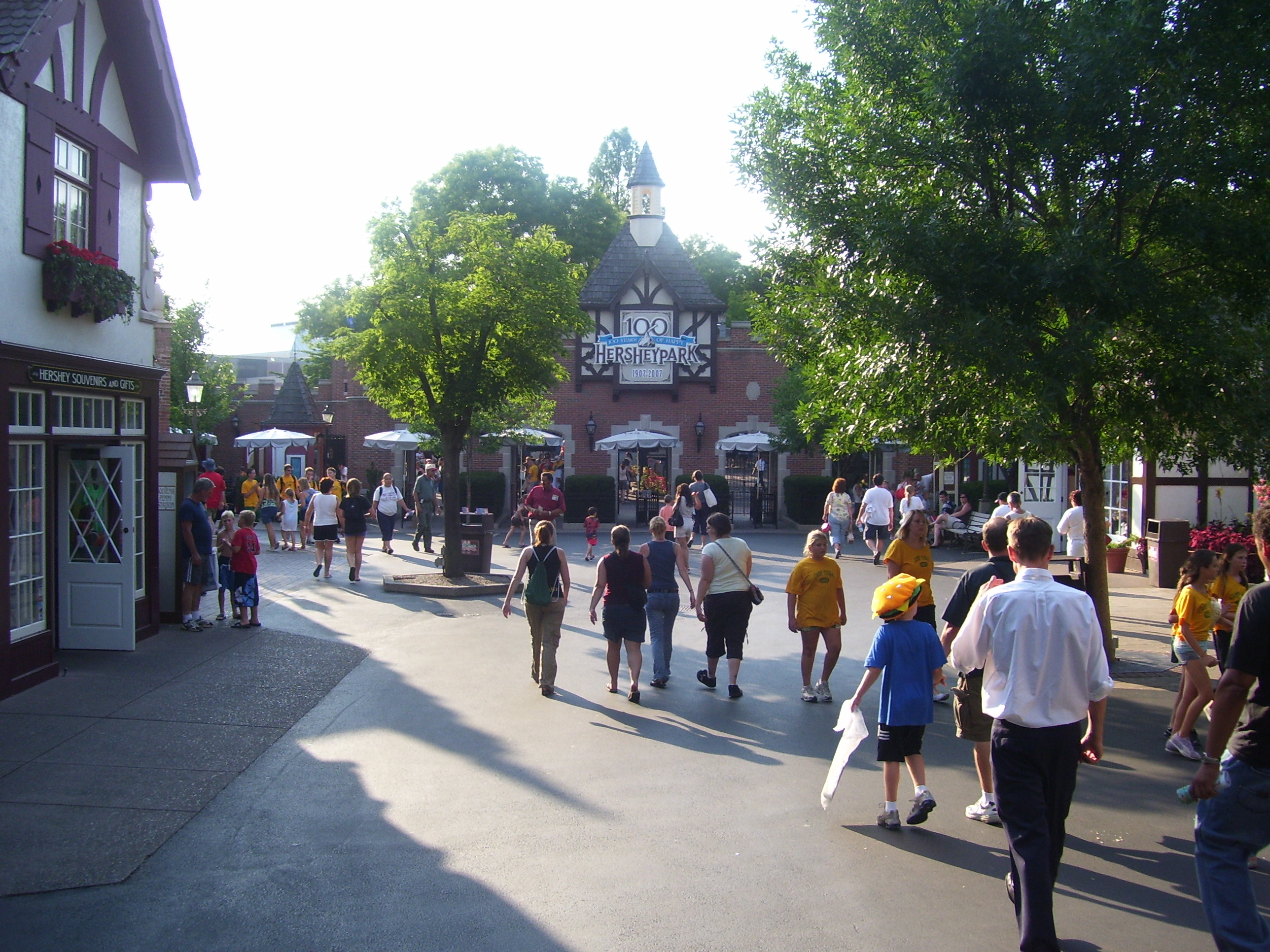
The Front Gates prior to 2019

Founder's Way is the second themed area of Hersheypark. Prior to the opening of Hershey's Chocolatetown, it began outside of the main gate near Tram Circle and encompassed the former Tudor Square (1973–2013) and Rhineland (1973–2013) areas when they were merged with Founder's Circle and Music Box Way. Now a few buildings from Rhineland still remain, including a few gift shops, the now-empty former station of the Sky Ride, Nathan's, and Dispatch Pizzeria Express.

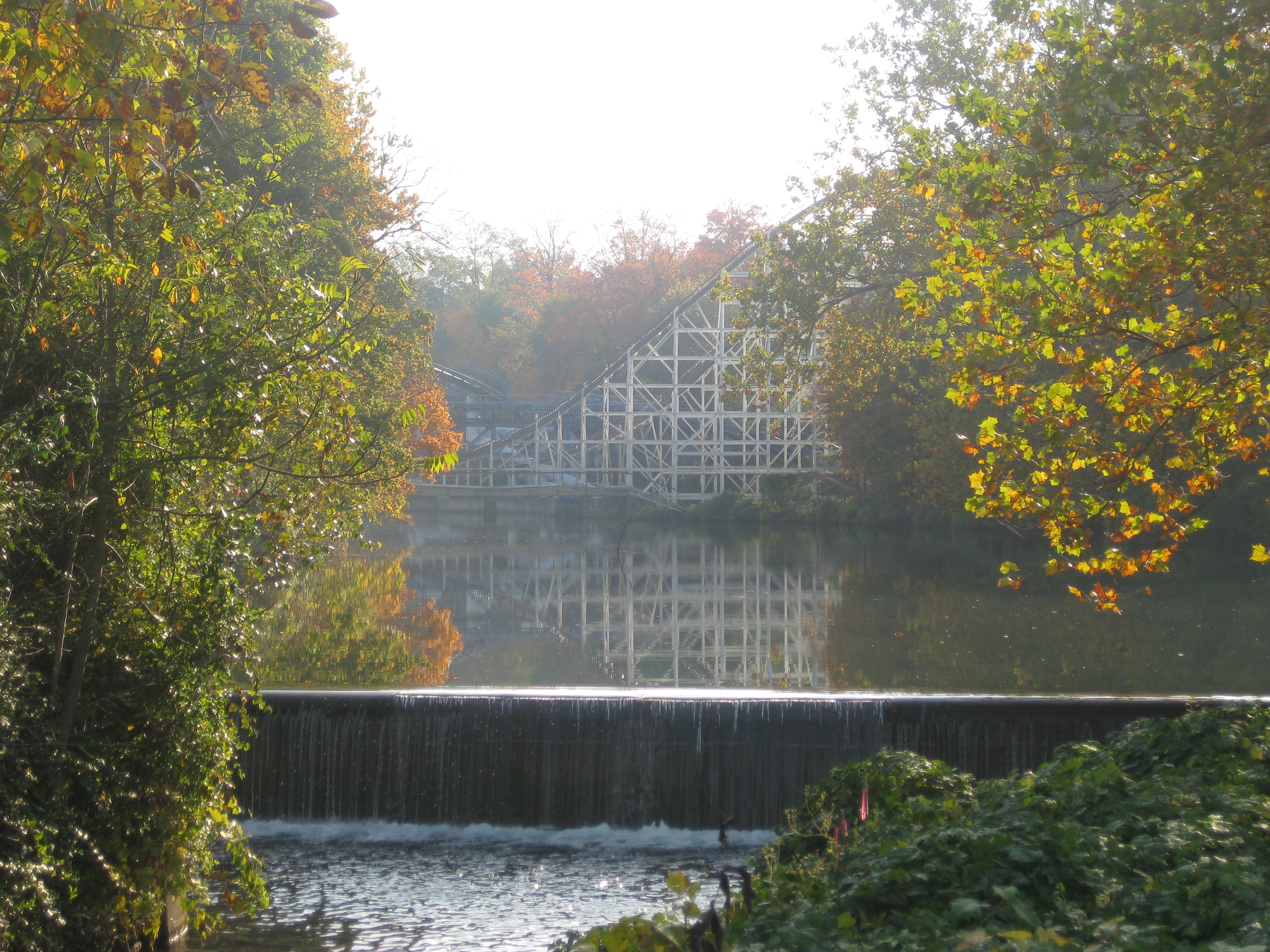
Spring Creek near the Comet (former location of the Sunken Gardens) before construction of Skyrush began

After the completion of Hershey's Chocolatetown, the rather steep hill in this area was leveled off. Going into the main circle of the area is a statue of Milton S. Hershey and a surrounding fountain, which honors the chocolate maker and founder of the park. The center of this circle is where the carousel used to be before being moved to Chocolatetown. The red, white, and blue pavilion that it used to be under still remains and is the middle of a circle that has a number of rides on the outside of the circle. From 1972 until 2004, this area was known as Carousel Circle. In 2005, Carousel Circle became Founder's Circle, until 2013, when it was merged with Music Box Way, Rhineland and Tudor Square.

The section of Founder's Way beyond Carousel circle is an area formerly themed as Der Deitsch Platz. This is home to the 1906 Grille, a Get the Picture Souvenir Photo Stand, where guests can see and purchase pictures taken of them by park photographers throughout their day, as well as a Subway restaurant.

The next section that was merged, formerly known as Music Box Way, is home to the Music Box Theater, the first enclosed theater stage in the park. It also includes rides such as the Fender Bender bumper cars, the Pirate, Reese's Cupfusion, as well as a number of kiddie rides. It is from this area that guests can access The Hollow, Pioneer Frontier, and a bridge leading to Kissing Tower Hill.

=== The Hollow ===
This section was originally named "Comet Hollow" after the oldest operating coaster in the park, Comet, and lies along Spring Creek. This is one of the oldest areas of Hersheypark; many rides have come and gone in this area. The park's first water ride, the Mill Chute installed in 1929, was alongside the creek where Great Bear runs today. The original location for the bumper cars, then called the Auto Skooters, is now the SooperDooperLooper Sandwich Stop. There were giant slides on the hill where the Hersheypark Amphitheater is located. A Streco turnpike ride was located underneath the high bridge that crossed Spring Creek to Minetown. In 1932, the Park installed a Traver Tumble Bug ride next to the Mill Chute. It was removed in 1981 to make room for the Wave Swinger. The park's carousel, before being moved to Carousel Circle in 1972, was located along the creek adjacent to the station of Comet. Before SooperDooperLooper came to Comet Hollow in 1977, a Himalaya ride was in that location, and before that, twin Eli Bridge Ferris wheels. A whip, and a station for the Electric Railroad were also located in Comet Hollow at one time.

One of Hersheypark's most significant floods occurred in 1972 as a result of Hurricane Agnes. A number of rides were heavily damaged or destroyed as a result. These rides include the turnpike ride, the Mill Chute (which at the time of the flood was rethemed as the Lost River), and the giant slides. They were eventually replaced; the Coal Cracker (1973) and Twin Turnpike (1975) were put on higher ground in Minetown, and the Merry Derry Dip Fun Slide was put in Midway America twenty-five years later in 1997.

Today, The Hollow features three roller coasters, Comet, Skyrush and SooperDooperLooper. It also houses the Wave Swinger, Tea Cups, and Sweet Swing rides. Almost all of Great Bear's track courses through The Hollow.

Beginning with the 2012 season and renovations being done to this area, the famous chocolate smell that was used in building materials was dampened due to concerns about safety. Additionally, the park changed the name of the once 'Comet Hollow' to the present name of 'The Hollow'.

=== Kissing Tower Hill ===
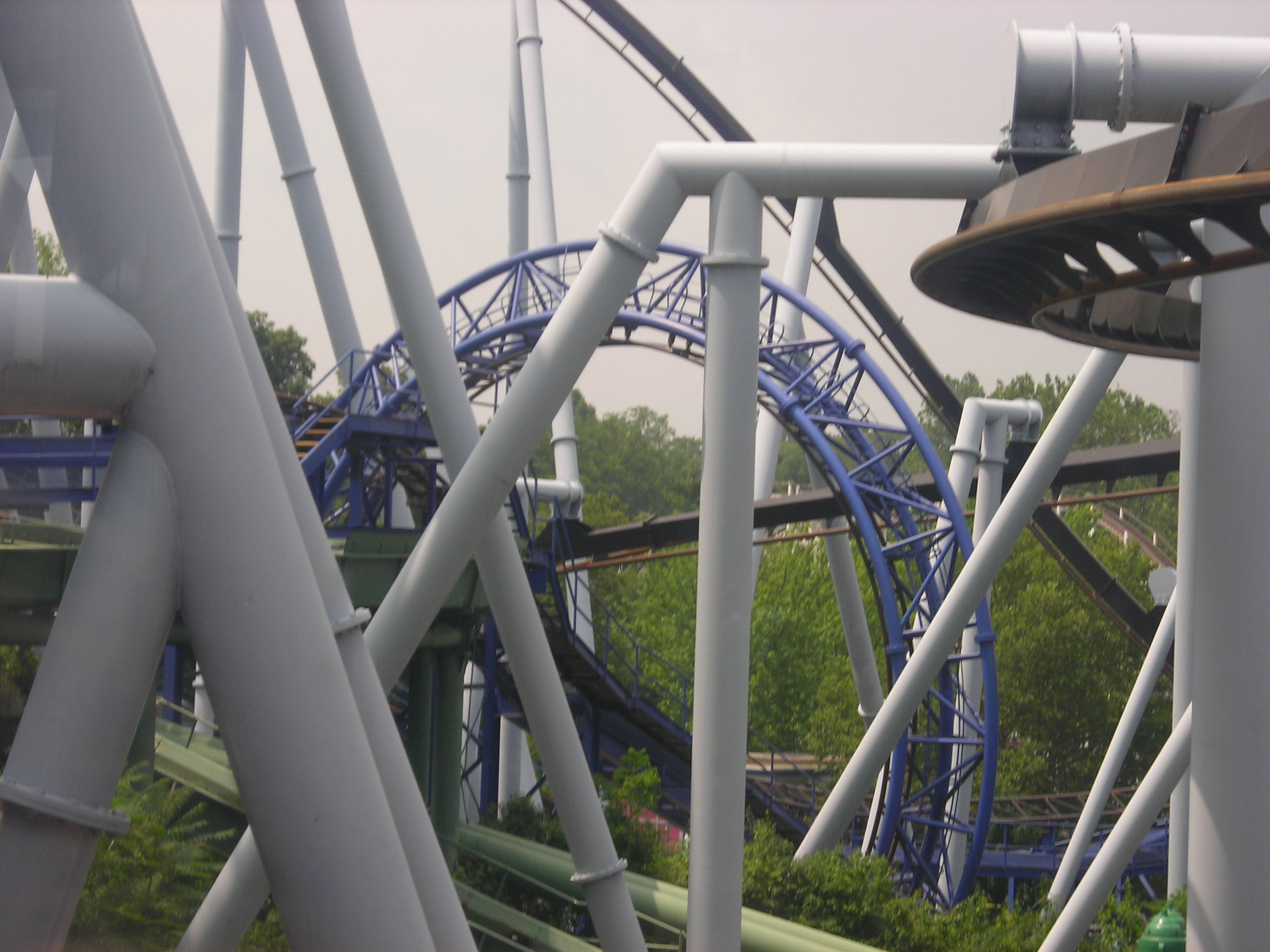
Great Bear and SooperDooperLooper

Until the start of the 2014 season, this area of the park had been called Minetown, which had been officially opened in 1990 with the additions of Convoy, Red Baron, Flying Falcon and Dinosaur-Go-Round. All except Dinosaur-Go-Round, Red Baron, and Flying Falcon are still in the area; Dinosaur-Go-Round was moved to Founder's Circle for the 2007 season so the Frog Hoppers could be moved to its location to make room for the Boardwalk, and following the 2016 season, Red Baron was moved to Pioneer Frontier and Flying Falcon was removed completely to make room for Hershey Triple Tower. The section features many classic Hersheypark attractions, including the Sunoco Twin Turnpike, Coal Cracker flume ride, Kissing Tower and Great Bear. It is also home to the Overlook Arcade (formerly the Minetown Arcade), Overlook Food Court (formerly the Minetown Restaurant), Hersheypark Aquatheater and the Hersheypark entrance to ZooAmerica. The Overlook Food Court Restaurant is a cafeteria-style place, and for many years was the only area in the park where alcohol was served. Alcohol is now also served at various locations in Pioneer Frontier and Midway America.

=== Pioneer Frontier ===
Pioneer Frontier is the southwestern-themed section of the park and includes four of the park's roller coasters: Trailblazer (the second oldest in the park), Jolly Rancher Remix, Storm Runner, and Fahrenheit. It also includes the Frontier Flyers, The Howler, Mini Scrambler, Livery Stables, and Red Baron. It also has its own food court which features a wide variety of restaurants. The section previously included the area up to and including Tidal Force until 2007 when Tidal Force and Canyon River Rapids were rezoned into the new Boardwalk. However, the southern end of the section was expanded at this time, encompassing the Pirate (swinging ship), The Claw, and the Dry Gulch Railroad, all rezoned from Music Box Way. Pioneer Frontier is also home to the Playdome Arcade (formerly the Double "R" Cade, the Frontier Meetinghouse, and a Cinema Vision), which was newly remodeled for the 2018 season.

=== Midway America ===
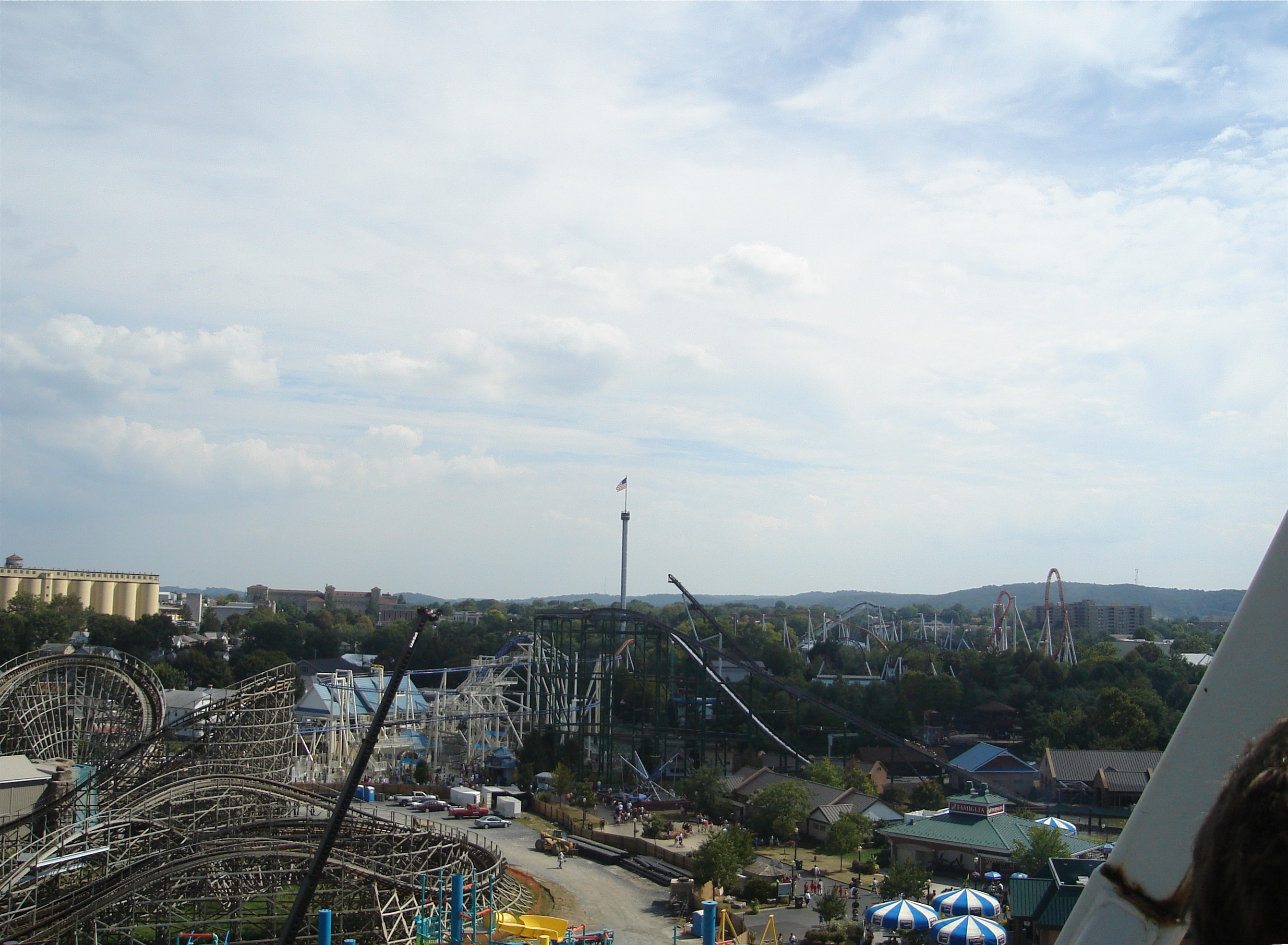
An overhead view of Hersheypark from the Ferris Wheel

Opened in 1996 as a homage to the classic midway fair, Midway America features four roller coasters, including Wildcat's Revenge, a steel hybrid coaster which opened in 2023, Lightning Racer (a dueling wooden roller coaster), and two steel coasters, Laff Trakk, a glow in the dark spinning family indoor coaster situated directly across the pathway from the last coaster in this area, Wild Mouse. The section also has Music Express, Merry Derry Dip Fun Slides, Ferris Wheel and three kiddie rides: Granny Bugs, Pony Parade, and Tiny Tracks.

=== The Boardwalk at Hersheypark ===
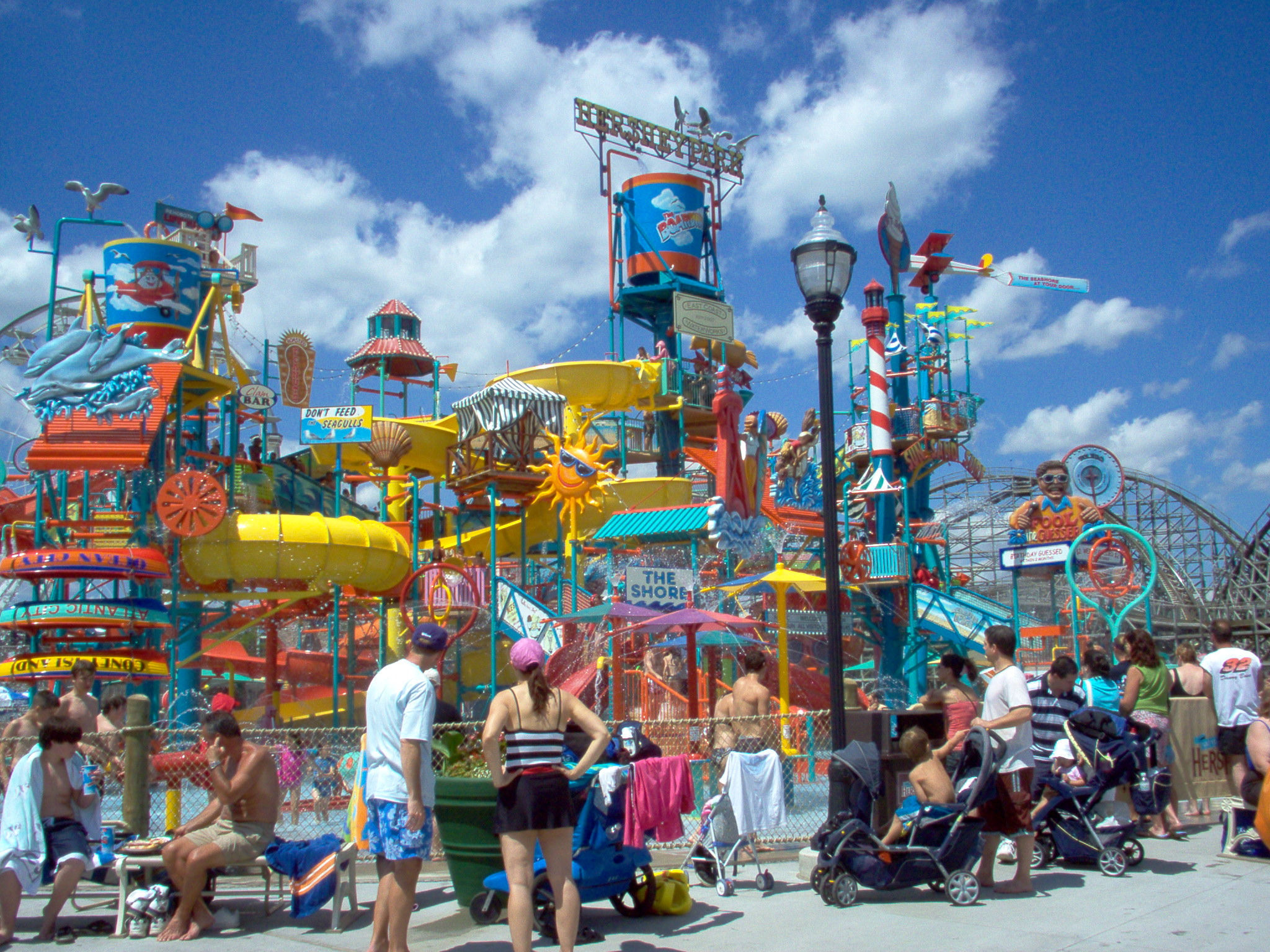
The Boardwalk at Hersheypark

The Boardwalk at Hersheypark, a water park, was officially opened in 2007 and featured five new water park attractions along with three already standing rides: Roller Soaker, Tidal Force, and Canyon River Rapids. Canyon River Rapids and Tidal Force were rezoned from Pioneer Frontier to the Boardwalk. In 2009, the Boardwalk received an expansion known as the Seaquel which replaced Canyon River Rapids with Intercoastal Waterway (a lazy river), the Shore (a wave pool) and cabanas. Roller Soaker was removed for the 2013 season; however, the station was left up. That same year, the area was renovated and taken up by a kiddie spray ground and some tables. For the 2018 season, Hersheypark announced that two new water attractions would be in this area: Breaker's Edge, a hydro-magnetic coaster slide that also counts as the park's 14th coaster, and Whitecap Racer, the longest mat racer slide in the world which features two sets of twisting enclosed tubes. Breaker's Edge uses the station that was formerly used by Roller Soaker.

== Bus access ==
Capital Area Transit provides direct access to/from Harrisburg with its HP bus during the summer season. Throughout the year, the 322 CAT route provides service to downtown Hershey and the Outlets at Hershey. Lebanon Transit offers direct access to/from Harrisburg on Route 8.A shuttle service is now provided to The Official Resorts of Hersheypark delivering you to the front gate.
