= Candymonium =

Steel roller coaster at Hersheypark

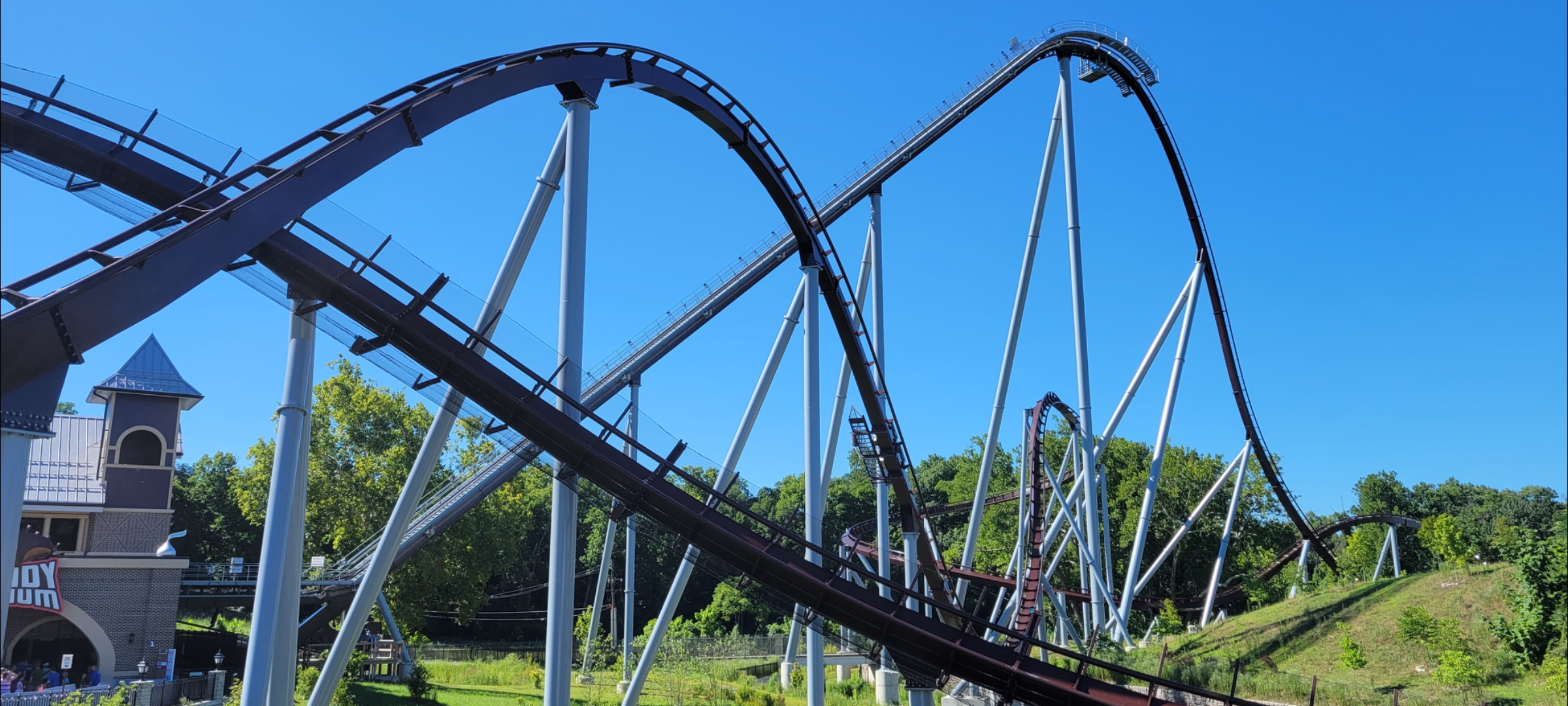
- Candymonium's first drop and final airtime hill

Hersheypark
- Location: Hersheypark
- Park section: Chocolatetown
- Coordinates: 40.2863°N 76.6590°W
- Status: Operating
- Opening date: July 3, 2020

General statistics
- Type: Steel
- Manufacturer: Bolliger & Mabillard
- Model: Hyper Coaster
- Track layout: Out and Back
- Lift/launch system: Chain Lift Hill
- Height: 210 ft (64 m)
- Drop: 216 ft (66 m)
- Length: 4,636 ft (1,413 m)
- Speed: 76 mph (122 km/h)
- Inversions: 0
- Duration: 2:26
- Max vertical angle: 77.3°
- Height restriction: 54 in (137 cm)
- Trains: 3 trains with 7 cars; riders arranged 4 across in a single row for a total of 28 riders per train
- Must transfer from wheelchair
- Candymonium at RCDB

Video

Candymonium is a steel roller coaster located at Hersheypark in Hershey, Pennsylvania, United States. Designed by Bolliger & Mabillard, the ride was announced in 2019 and opened on July 3, 2020. It is the tallest, fastest, and longest roller coaster at Hersheypark. It was introduced with a newly themed section of the park called Hershey's Chocolatetown, adjacent to Hershey's Chocolate World.

== History ==
On October 3, 2018, Hershey Entertainment and Resorts revealed their "biggest announcement ever": a new 23-acre (9.3 ha) section of the park named Chocolatetown, as well as a new entrance plaza, both of which would open in 2020. The anchor attractions were scheduled to include a roller coaster, as well as a new shopping area and a fountain, built at a cost of $150 million. The new coaster was planned to be a hypercoaster, over 200 feet (61 m) tall, which required approval from the Federal Aviation Administration. According to the filing with the FAA, the coaster was to be, at most, 220 feet (67 m) above ground level. The FAA approved the ride.

In July 2019, Hersheypark officials announced that the new roller coaster would be called Candymonium, marketed as the "world’s sweetest coaster". According to Hershey Entertainment and Resorts Company CEO John Lawn, "the coaster was a key ingredient to the entire Hershey’s Chocolatetown". By that time, the first few track pieces and part of the station had been built.

In an Instagram post in October 2019, Hersheypark posted an image showing that construction on the lift hill was partially complete. In November 2019, Candymonium topped out when its lift hill was installed. The final track piece was installed in February 2020, though an opening date had not been announced at that time. Due to the COVID-19 pandemic in Pennsylvania, construction on Chocolatetown was delayed in April 2020, though construction resumed the next month. The first test train on Candymonium ran on May 6, 2020, with the coaster officially opening on July 3, 2020. Because of COVID-19 restrictions, only a limited number of guests were initially allowed in the park, and riders had to wear face masks while waiting for the ride (although they could take off their masks on the coaster).

== Ride experience ==
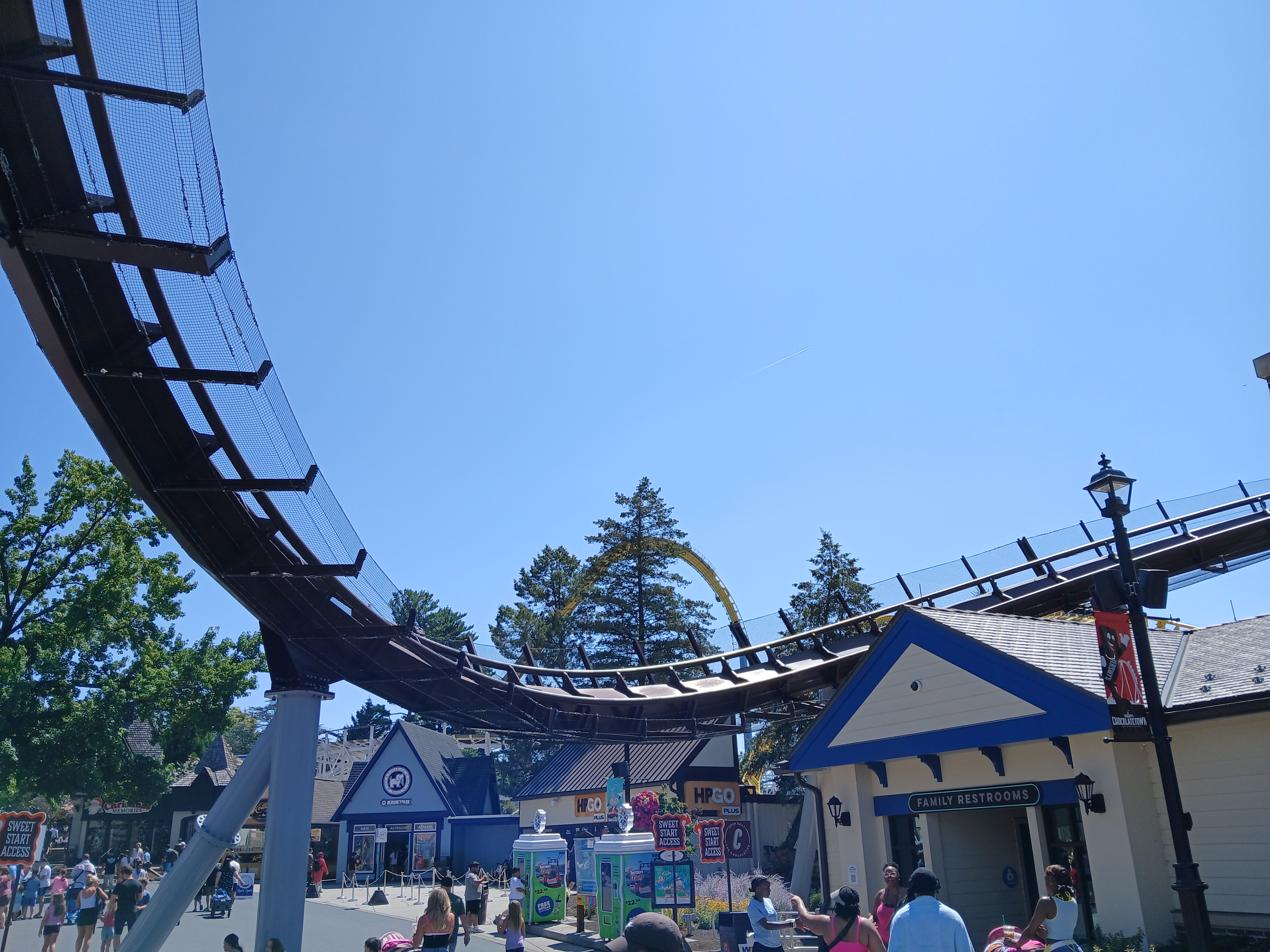
The curve before the final brake run

After leaving the station, the train immediately ascends the 210-foot (64 m) lift hill. After reaching the top, it enters a 210-foot (64 m) drop, in which the train reaches at a top speed of 76 miles per hour (122 km/h). Then, the train ascends and descends a 169-foot (52 m) airtime hill over Spring Creek. After the hill, the track reverses direction via a 123-degree Hammerhead turn. After climbing over another camelback hill, a series of airtime hills follows as the track travels back above Spring Creek before making an upward helix to the right and a leftward bank. The train then travels over another airtime hill and down onto a 270-degree left turn which circles the Kisses Fountain. The train then dips slightly and then rises into trim brakes before curving to the right, downward, and up into the final brake run.

== Characteristics ==
The ride is 4,636 feet (1,413 m) long with an initial drop of 210 feet (64 m). The track is colored chocolate brown with light gray supports and contains seven camelback hills. The track covers around 7 acres (2.8 ha) of land. Trains reach a maximum speed of 76 miles per hour (122 km/h).

The three trains represent three Hershey's candies: Reese's, Kisses, and Twizzlers. Each car seats four riders in a single row for a total of 28 riders per train.

== Critical reception ==
When Candymonium opened, Attractions Magazine wrote: "Candymonium is a hyper-coaster that lives up to that name, packing in thrills without leaving riders rattled." A reporter for LNP (newspaper) wrote: "In many ways, Candymonium is the more refined cousin to Skyrush. [...] But whereas Skyrush is a ride I would not recommend to people who are skittish about roller coasters, Candymonium could be just what people hoping to overcome those fears are looking for due to a lack of loops and truly death-defying spins." The ride won a Golden Ticket Award from Amusement Today magazine in 2021, in which Candymonium was ranked as the 5th best steel roller coaster in the world.

Golden Ticket Awards: Top steel Roller Coasters
Year									1998	1999
Ranking									–	–
Year	2000	2001	2002	2003	2004	2005	2006	2007	2008	2009
Ranking	–	–	–	–	–	–	–	–	–	–
Year	2010	2011	2012	2013	2014	2015	2016	2017	2018	2019
Ranking	–	–	–	–	–	–	–	–	–	–
Year	2020	2021	2022	2023	2024	2025	2026			
Ranking	N/A	5	19	24	27	35	49 (tie)			
