= Kissing Tower =

Observation tower at Hersheypark

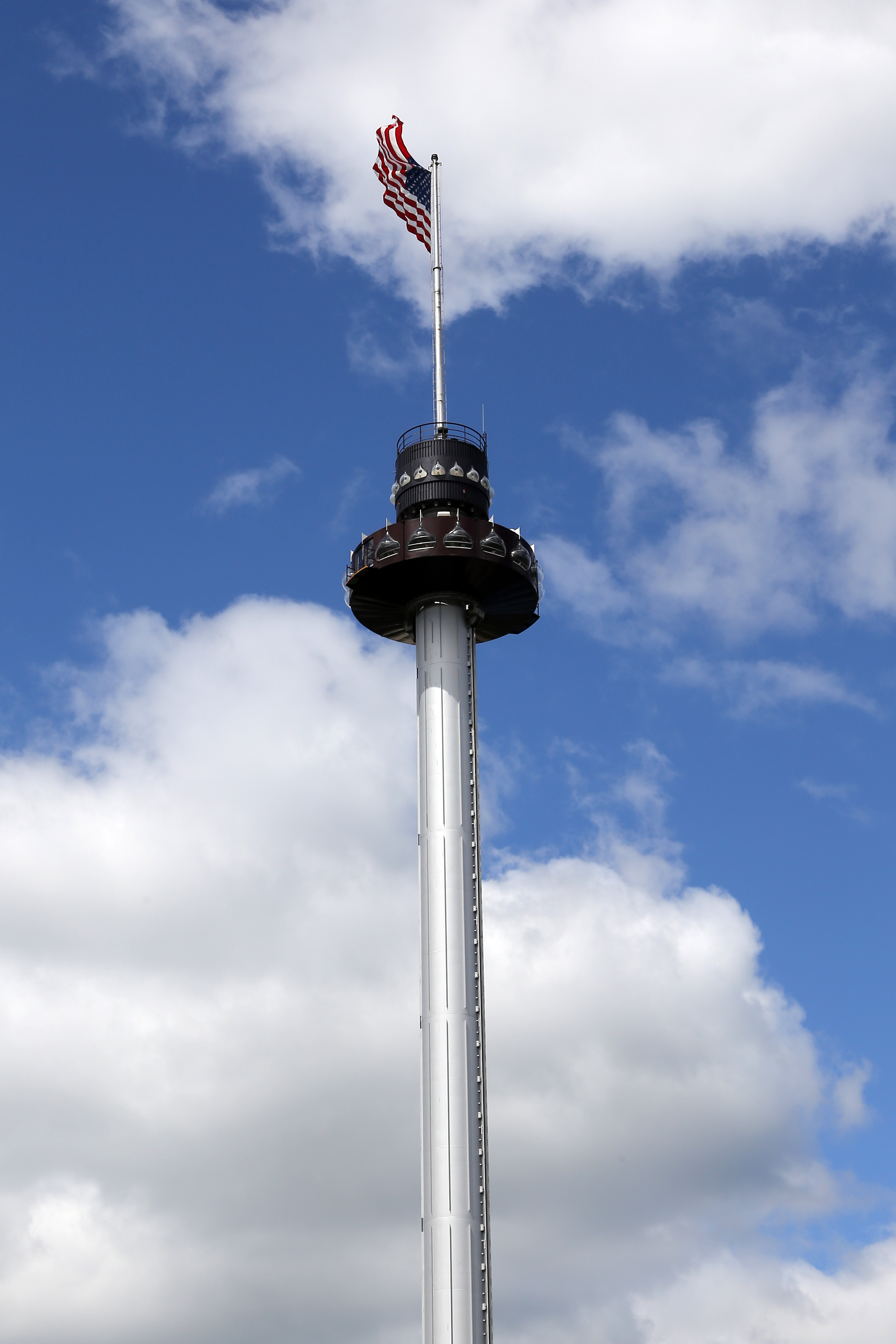
- Gondola at the top of Kissing Tower

Hersheypark
- Area: Kissing Tower Hill
- Coordinates: 40°17′14″N 76°39′08″W
- Status: Operating
- Opening date: May 18, 1975

Ride statistics
- Attraction type: Gyro tower
- Manufacturer: Intamin
- Height: 330 ft (100 m)
- Vehicles: 1
- Website: Official website
- Must transfer from wheelchair

Kissing Tower is a gyro tower at Hersheypark in Hershey, Pennsylvania. The tower tops out at 330 feet (100 m), making it the tallest attraction in the park and the tallest structure in Hershey. Riders reach 250 feet (76 m), surpassing the Candymonium roller coaster at the same park which tops out at 210 feet (64 m). Kissing Tower is one of Hersheypark's most famous attractions.

== History ==
Kissing Tower was planned as part of a five-phase redevelopment of Hersheypark in the 1970s. The tower, named after Hershey's Kisses, opened in 1975 and features windows shaped like the candy. In 2014, the tower's region was renamed from "Minetown" to "Kissing Tower Hill" after the attraction. In 2020, one of the windows was damaged by wind and had to be replaced.

== Ride experience ==
The queue line is themed around kissing. Riders board an enclosed gondola and sit on benches that encircle the cabin. The gondola revolves as it gently ascends to 250 feet (76 m), and information about the history of Hershey is played from speakers. Riders experience a panoramic view of the park and the town of Hershey through the kiss-shaped windows as the cabin completes three revolutions during its ascent and descent.

== In culture ==
Kissing Tower appears in RollerCoaster Tycoon 3: Soaked! as a buildable attraction.
