= Comet (Hersheypark) =

Wooden roller coaster at Hersheypark

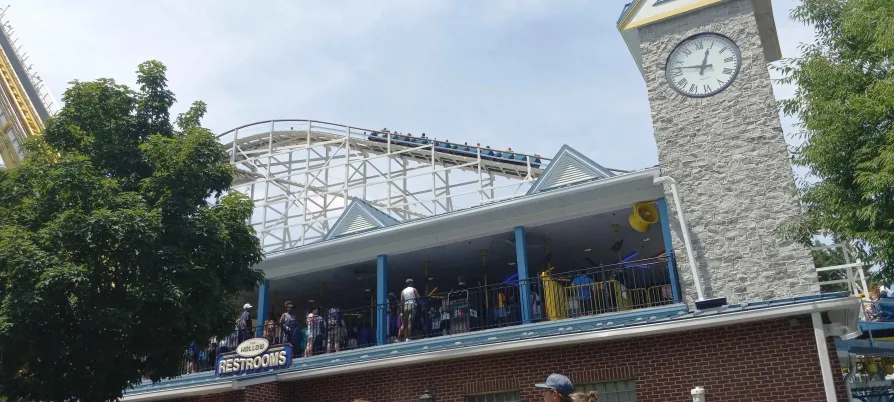
- Comet going up a lift hill, seen above the Skyrush station.

Hersheypark
- Location: Hersheypark
- Park section: The Hollow
- Coordinates: 40.286413°N 76.655644°W
- Status: Operating
- Opening date: May 30, 1946; 80 years ago

General statistics
- Type: Wood
- Manufacturer: Philadelphia Toboggan Coasters
- Designer: Herbert Paul Schmeck
- Track layout: Modified Double Out and Back
- Lift/launch system: Chain lift hill
- Height: 84 ft (26 m)
- Drop: 78 ft (24 m)
- Length: 3,360 ft (1,020 m)
- Speed: 50 mph (80 km/h)
- Duration: 1:45
- Max vertical angle: 47°
- Capacity: 950 riders per hour
- Height restriction: 42 in (107 cm)
- Trains: 2 trains with 4 cars; riders arranged 2 across in 3 rows for a total of 24 riders per train
- Comet at RCDB

Comet is a wooden roller coaster at Hersheypark in Hershey, Pennsylvania. It is located in the Hollow section of Hersheypark, next to Skyrush. Built in 1946 by the Philadelphia Toboggan Coasters (PTC) of Philadelphia, Pennsylvania, the coaster features a double out and back track layout. When built it was jointly owned by Hershey Park and PTC. The maximum speed is 50 miles per hour (80 km/h).

== History ==
Comet opened in 1946. In 1964, Comet received 6,650 individual 10-watt chaser lights. In 1994, Comet received 2 new trains named "Mork's Comet" and "Halley's Comet". The names were removed when the comets got new trains in 2024. One of the old trains is currently used as seating at the Hershey Museum, and the other was donated to the National Roller Coaster Museum and Archives.

Comet was re-tracked during the off-season in 2006, and new seat belts were added two years later. Comet was repainted the same color white, and the station was redone, during the 2012 off-season. Two years later, the lift hill was rehabilitated and straightened, removing the well known "kink" that was in the lift hill. At the 2023 IAAPA Expo, it was announced that Comet would receive new PTC trains for the 2024 season.

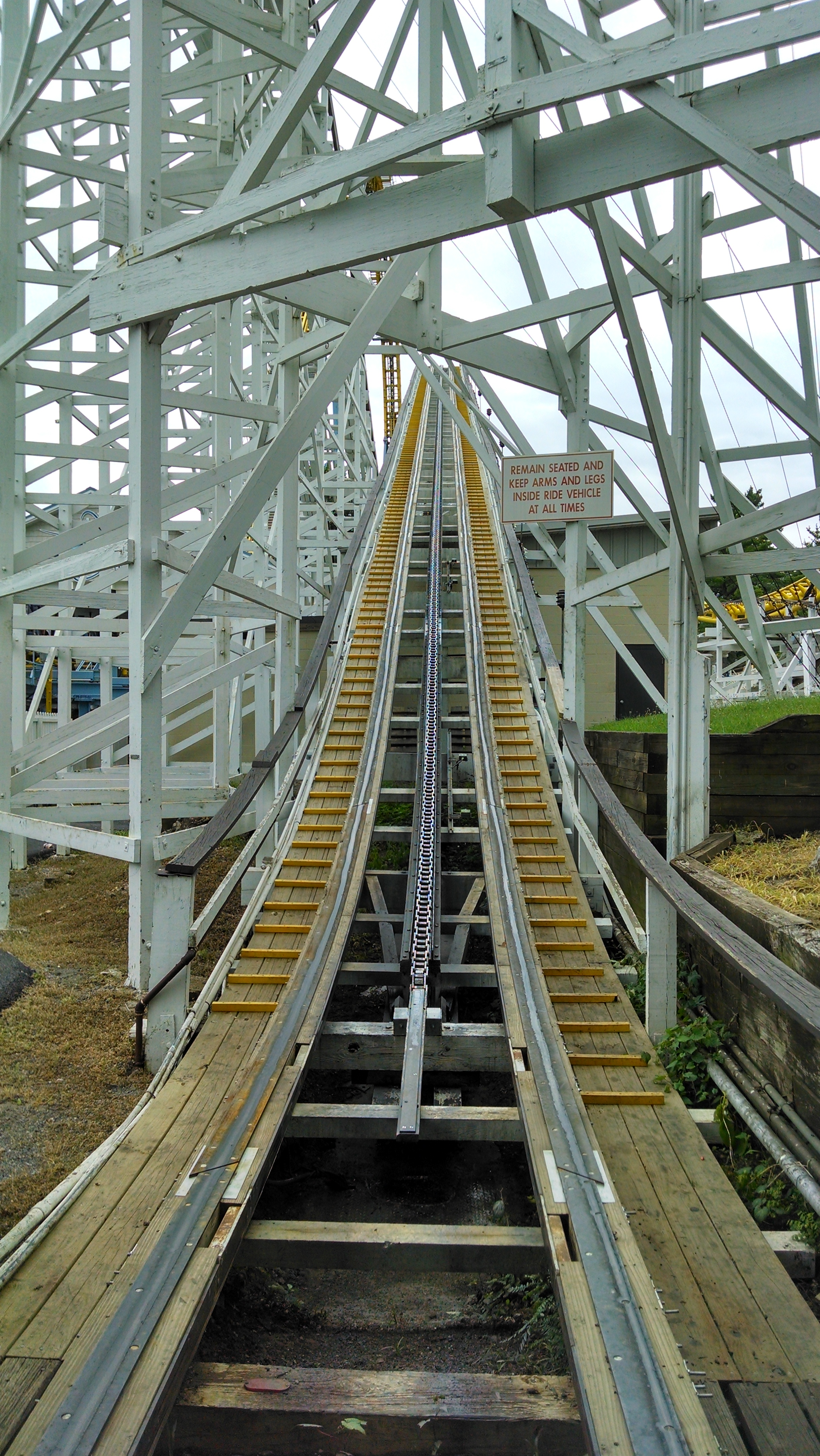
Comet's lift hill

== Ride experience ==
Comet goes up a 97-foot (30 m) lift, then drops 96 feet (29 m) at a 47-degree angle. After the first drop, the car goes up a hill and then makes a left 180-degree turn. The car drops back down another hill, goes up a small hill, and then up a larger hill, making another 180-degree turn. After the turn, there is another drop and then the track makes a right turn ("dog leg"), going through several bunny hills before another left 180-degree turn. A second set of bunny hills is followed by a left turn and two further bunny hills, then the car slows into the station.

The car usually sits for a few moments before coming around into the station because of an extra set of brakes that served as an unloading point until Comet was renovated to its current "spill 'n fill" operation.

== Reception ==
A magazine in the 1970s proclaimed Comet to be among the top 15 roller coasters in the U.S. By 1996, Comet was the second-most-ridden attraction at Hersheypark, behind Coal Cracker.

Comet has been ranked among the top 50 wooden roller coasters by Amusement Today's Golden Ticket Awards several times.

Golden Ticket Awards: Top wood Roller Coasters
Year									1998	1999
Ranking									–	–
Year	2000	2001	2002	2003	2004	2005	2006	2007	2008	2009
Ranking	–	–	–	–	–	–	–	–	–	–
Year	2010	2011	2012	2013	2014	2015	2016	2017	2018	2019
Ranking	–	–	–	–	–	45 (tie)	–	–	–	–
Year	2020	2021	2022	2023	2024	2025	2026			
Ranking	N/A	37	–	49	45 (tie)	–	42			
