= Storm Runner =

Roller coaster at Hersheypark

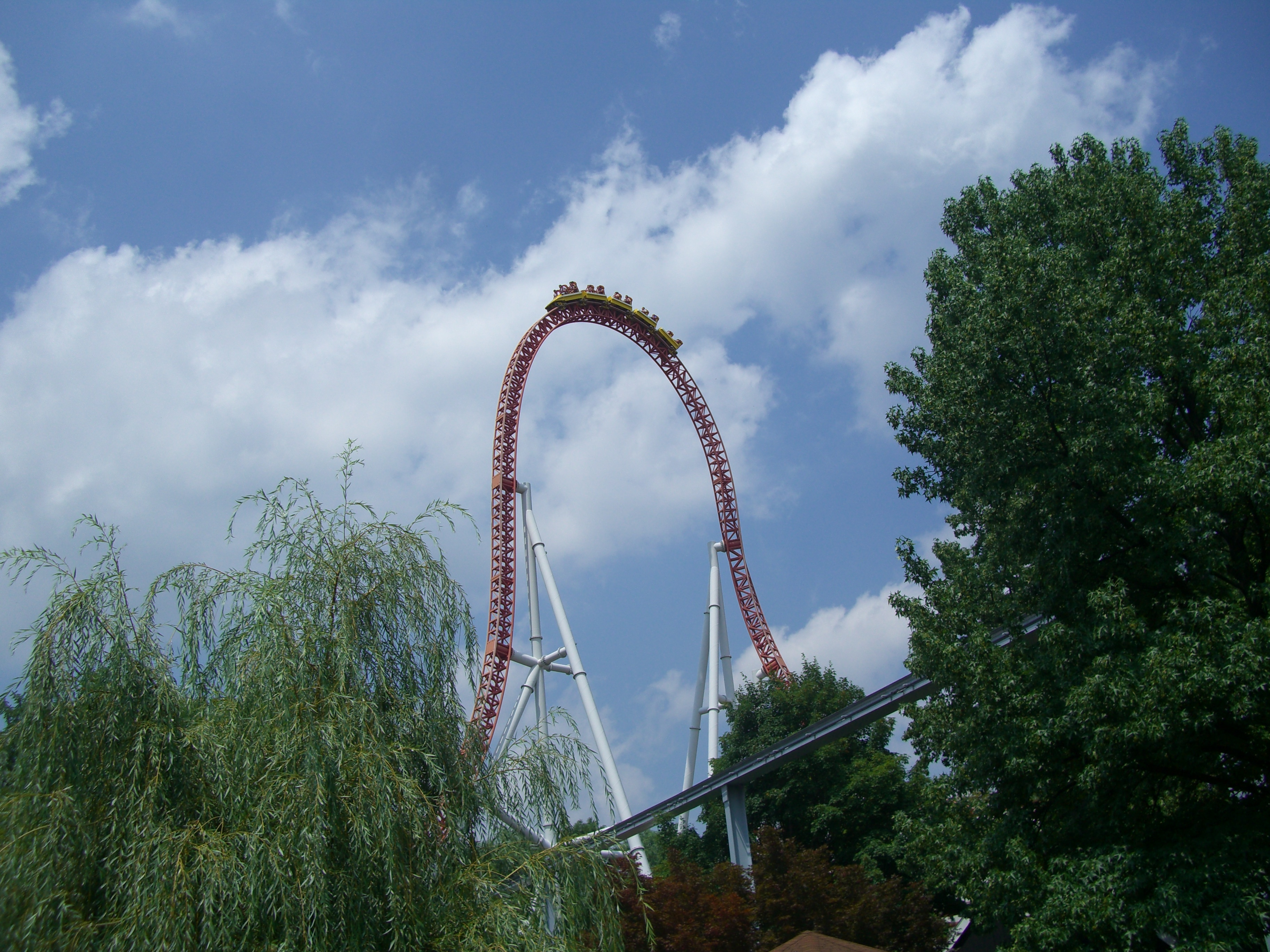
- Storm Runner's top hat

Hersheypark
- Location: Hersheypark
- Park section: Pioneer Frontier
- Coordinates: 40°17′23″N 76°39′13″W
- Status: Operating
- Opening date: May 8, 2004
- Cost: $12,500,000

General statistics
- Type: Steel – Launched
- Manufacturer: Intamin
- Designer: Werner Stengel
- Model: Accelerator Coaster
- Lift/launch system: Hydraulic Launch
- Height: 150 ft (46 m)
- Drop: 180 ft (55 m)
- Length: 2,600 ft (790 m)
- Speed: 72 mph (116 km/h)
- Inversions: 3
- Duration: 0:50
- Max vertical angle: 90°
- Capacity: 1200 riders per hour
- Acceleration: 0 to 72 mph (0 to 116 km/h) in 2 seconds
- G-force: 5
- Restraint style: Over-the-shoulder
- Height restriction: 54 in (137 cm)
- Trains: 2 trains with 5 cars; riders arranged 2 across in 2 rows for a total of 20 riders per train
- Website: Official website
- Storm Runner at RCDB

Video
- Storm Runner point of view

Storm Runner is a launched roller coaster located at Hersheypark in Hershey, Pennsylvania. Manufactured by Intamin Amusement Rides and located in the Pioneer Frontier section of the park, the Accelerator Coaster opened to the public on May 8, 2004. It reaches a maximum height of 150 feet (46 m), a largest drop of 180 feet, and launches from 0 to 72 mph (116 km/h) in two seconds. Storm Runner features a top hat element, three inversions, a dual loading station, and a magnetic braking system. In addition, it was designed to interact with three other Hersheypark rides: Dry Gulch Railroad, the Monorail, and Trailblazer.

Storm Runner was the first Accelerator Coaster to utilize over-the-shoulder restraints and the first to have a dual-loading station with switch tracks. It was also the first Accelerator Coaster to feature inversions. A replica of the ride was included in RollerCoaster Tycoon 3's Soaked expansion pack under the same name.

== History ==
In August 2003, Hersheypark announced that it had hired Swiss roller coaster manufacturer Intamin to construct a new launched coaster in the Pioneer Frontier section of the park. The ride would replace Balloon Flite, a children's ride that had operated for 23 years. Hershey Entertainment and Resorts Company was considering one of three names for the coaster: Steel Stampede, Renegade, and Storm Runner. Hershey Entertainment hosted a contest in which members of the public could vote on the name. More than 46,000 people voted on the name over a two-week period. In November 2003, before the name was officially announced, Hershey Entertainment filed a trademark for the name "Storm Runner". Hershey Entertainment formally announced the coaster's name on November 5, 2003. Construction of Storm Runner began in February 2004, and ultimately cost $12.5 million. By April 2004, the coaster had begun testing.

Storm Runner opened to the public on May 8, 2004. The first people to ride the coaster included members of the Pennsylvania Army National Guard, as well as winners of an online lottery. Initially, the queue line had to be extended with ropes due to the ride's popularity. In 2005, the park added an overflow queue line located next to Trailblazer's first drop.

For the 2020 season, Storm Runner remained closed while waiting on necessary parts for maintenance and repairs that were delayed due to the COVID-19 pandemic. It reopened during the 2021 season and has operated since.

== Ride experience ==
Storm Runner contains about 2,600 feet (790 m) of track and three inversions. The duration of the ride is about 58 seconds (including the wait on the launch track). The ride has near-miss points with three attractions: the Monorail, Dry Gulch Railroad, and Trailblazer. As the train leaves the station, it travels through the switch track, and onto the launch track. As the train moves into position, the sound of a heartbeat is played. After a brief pause, the train rolls backwards slightly, the brakes on the launch track retract, and a pre-recorded voice says "Now, get ready! Here we go!", and the train is launched from 0-72 mph in 2 seconds. Further down the launch track, an on-ride photograph is taken.

Immediately following the launch, the train climbs vertically through a 150 foot top hat. The train then drops 180 feet, reaching top speeds of 75 mph, before climbing into a 135 foot tall cobra loop. After another drop, the train traverses the flying snake dive (a heartline roll followed by a dive drop). Following these final inversions, the train descends and crosses over Spring Creek and a section of Trailblazer, while passing under a section of the monorail. The train then rises through two banked turns, first to the right, then the left. After a brief moment of airtime, the train enters the final brake run. Following the brake run, the train curves to the left, and returns to the side of the station from which it was dispatched.

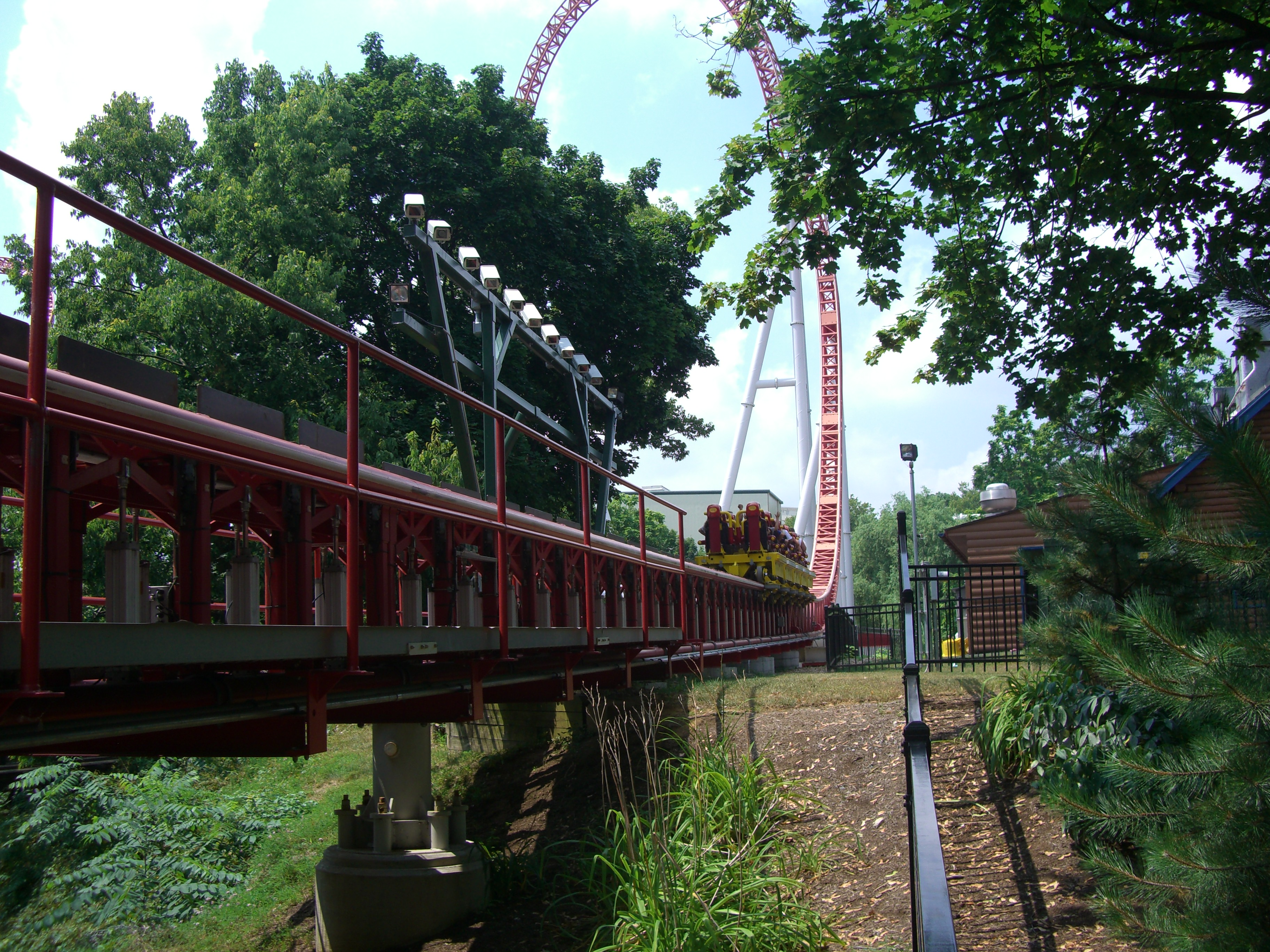
Launch section

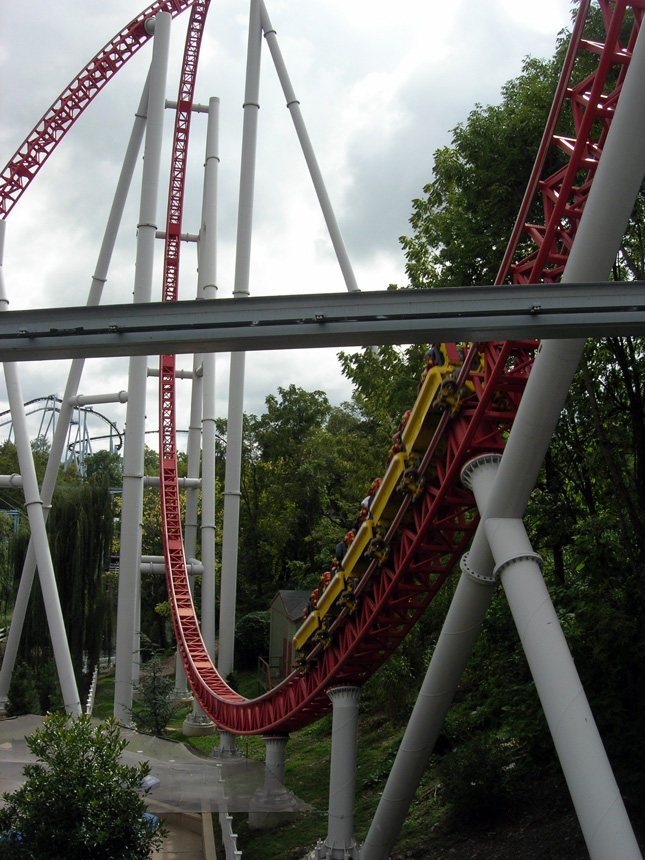
First drop off the top hat

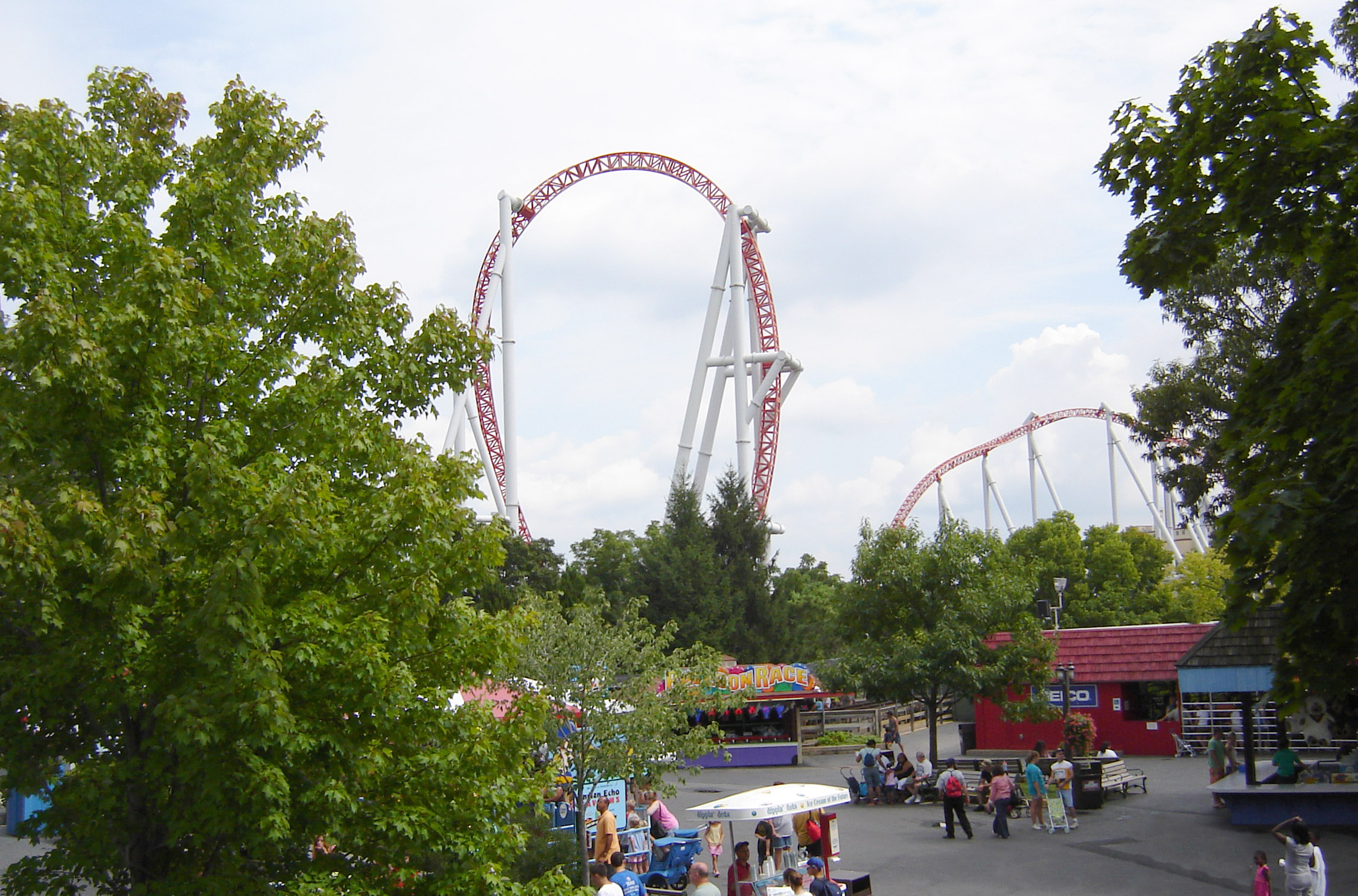
Cobra loop

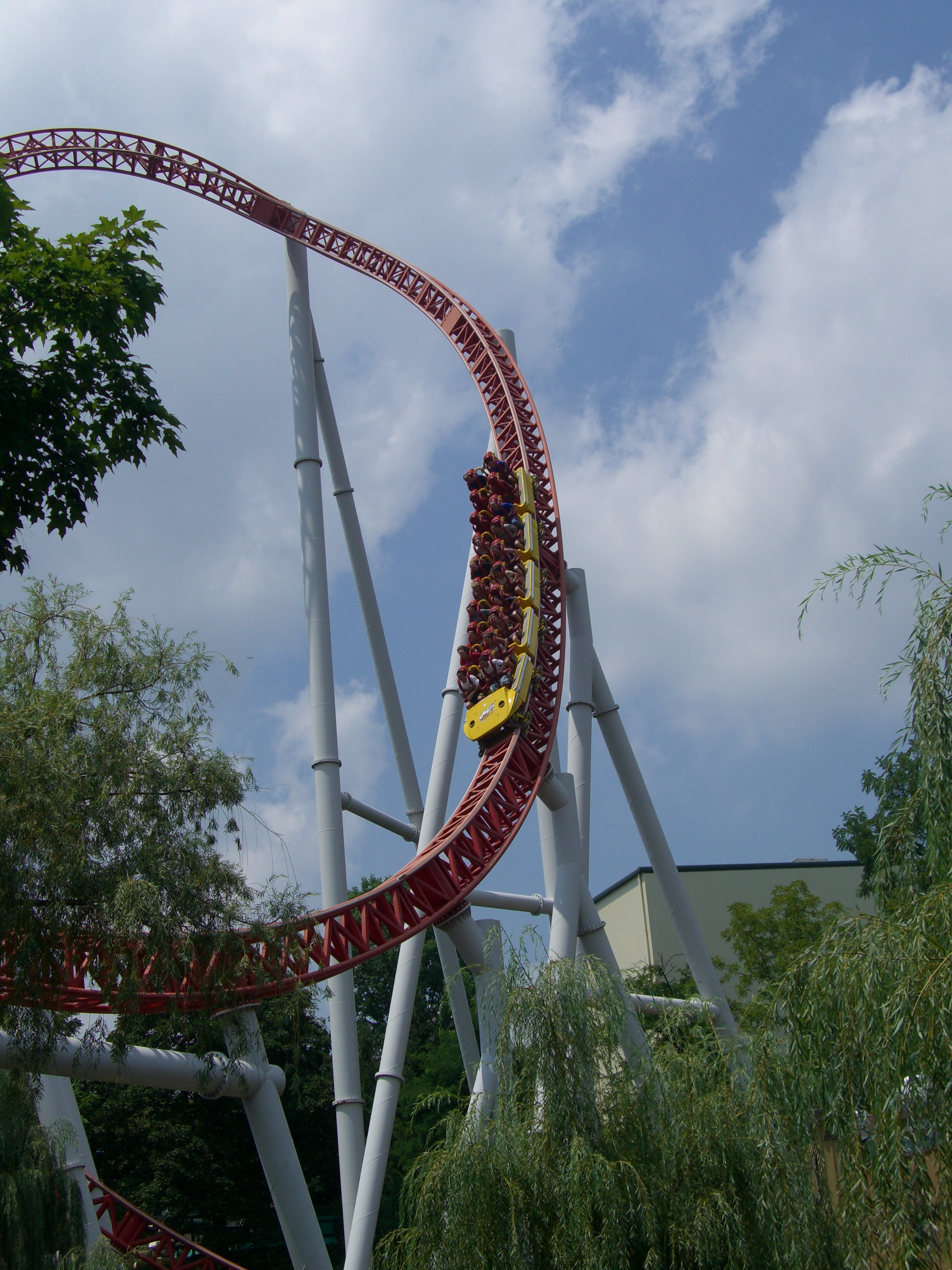
Dive loop from another angle

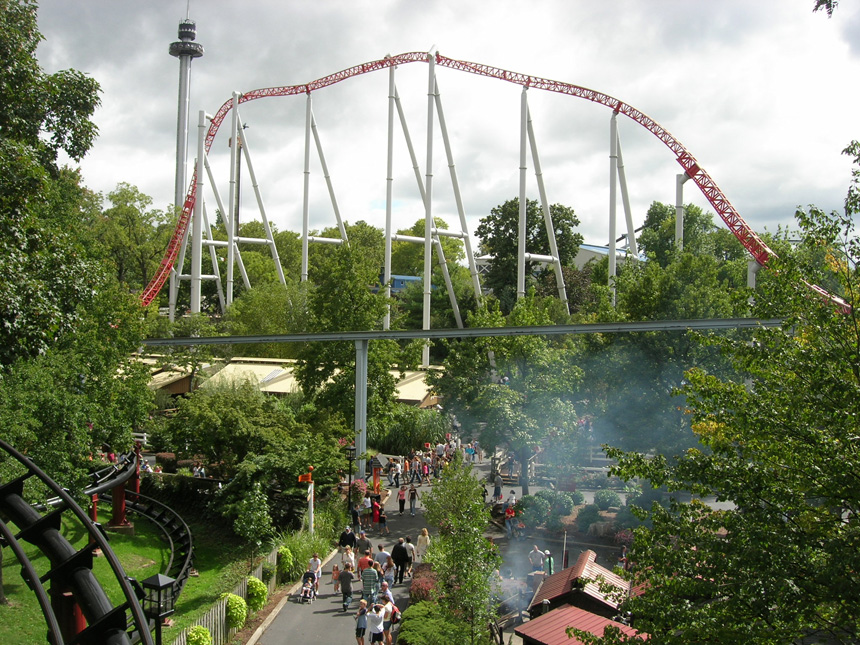
Heartline roll and flying snake dive

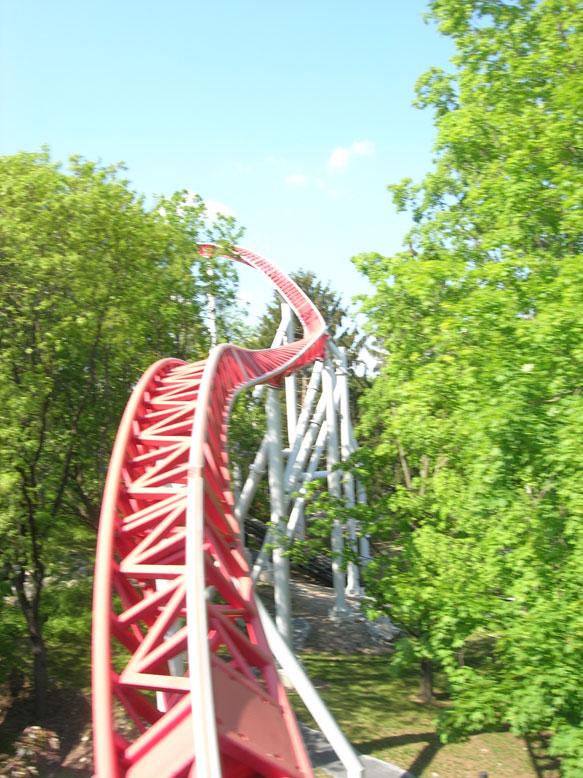
Twist finale before brake run

== Launch system ==
Storm Runner is an Accelerator Coaster, in which trains are launched via a hydraulically charged system. Hersheypark chose to utilize a hydraulic launch system because it used less energy than a linear induction motor launch system. At the end of the launch track, there is a small building which houses the motors, pumps, and other components of the launch system, including the winch. Within the launch track, there is a catch car running in a trough in the center of the track, which the train connects to for launch. The catch car is connected to the winch with steel cables, two in front of the catch car running parallel down the trough to pull it down the track during launch, and one on the rear to pull the catch car back to the starting point. Prior to launch, hydraulic fluid (a noncompressible fluid) is pumped into several accumulators filled with compressed nitrogen. The additional hydraulic fluid further compresses the nitrogen, which creates energy for the launch. When enough pressure has been achieved and the system is ready for launch, valves open and the pressure built in the accumulators is released, spinning a large winch that pulls the catch car and train rapidly down the track. As the train continues on, the catch car is slowed by its own braking system within the trough, and is slowly returned to its starting point via electric motors as the system rebuilds pressure for the next launch. A similar system is used on Xcelerator, another Accelerator Coaster.

== Incident ==
On June 26, 2018, a 9-year-old boy's harness was allegedly not properly secured after he boarded the train. His father, who was riding with him, stated that his son was scared that he was not properly secured and might be ejected from the ride, claiming his son's restraint was fully open. The ride operators allegedly failed to address the concern when asked for assistance by the father. The man stated that as the train began to move out of the station and into the launch position, his son exited the car. The man stated he and his son have suffered anxiety-like symptoms as a result of the incident. A lawsuit was filed two years later on July 2, 2020.
