= List of former Hersheypark attractions =

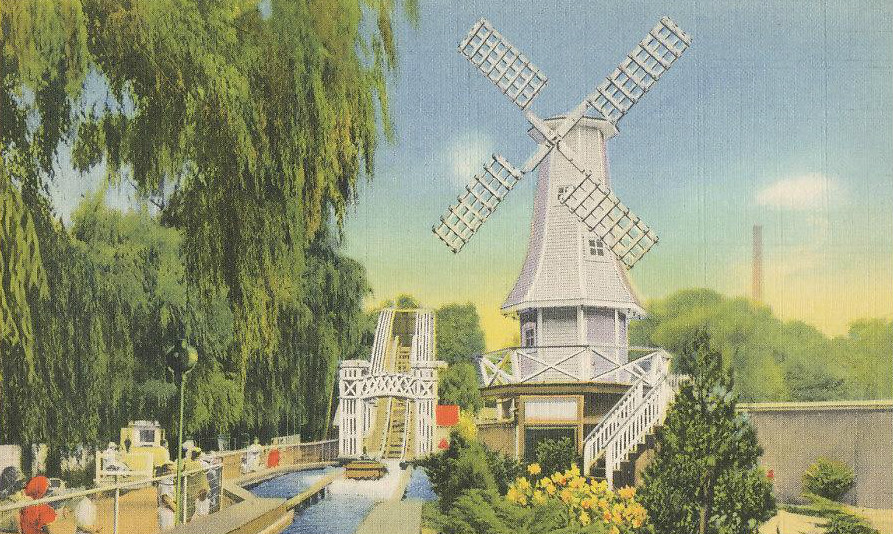
Mill Chute operated from 1929 to 1962, when it was re-themed as Lost River in 1963.

Hersheypark (operating as "Hershey Park" through 1970) is an amusement park located in Hershey, Derry Township, Pennsylvania. The park was formally opened by Milton S. Hershey on May 30, 1906, and it became an entity of Hershey Estates when the estates company was established in 1927. From its opening in 1906 until 1970, it was an open-gate park. In 1971, the park was gated and an entry fee charged. This was the first preparations for the renovation project designed by R. Duell and Associates that would begin in 1972. This is a list of former Hersheypark attractions.

The first ride the park removed was also the first purchased for the park, a Herschell-Spillman carousel called the "merry-go-round." It was in the park from 1908 until 1912.

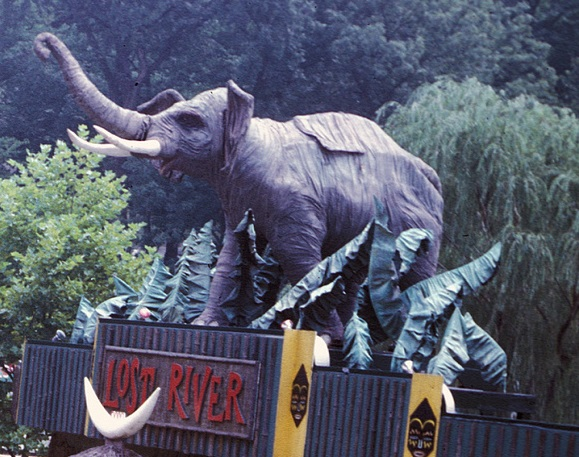
The Lost River in 1970. In June 1972, the ride was destroyed in a flood.

== Past and cancelled roller coasters ==
Hersheypark has removed five roller coasters over its history, and cancelled two projects prior to being built. Each of the five roller coasters removed were notable as being a park first: The Wild Cat was Hersheypark's first roller coaster, Wildcat, which opened in 1996, the Toboggans (initially called Twin Towers Toboggans because there were twin Toboggan coasters side-by-side) were Hersheypark's first steel roller coaster, Mini-Comet was Hersheypark's first kiddie coaster, and Roller Soaker was the park's only water coaster. The Mini-Comet was replaced by the Cocoa Cruiser, a kiddie coaster in the shadows of Storm Runner.

Hersheypark's two cancelled roller coaster projects were a proposed Flying Turns coaster and a proposed coaster named Turbulence. Flying Turns would have been opened in 1942, however America's entry into World War II effectively ended the project. 63 years later, Hersheypark was planning to open what would have been the park's eleventh existing coaster - Turbulence. Early in the project phase, a dispute arose between the park and the ride manufacturer. Initially postponed, the project never resumed and was cancelled.

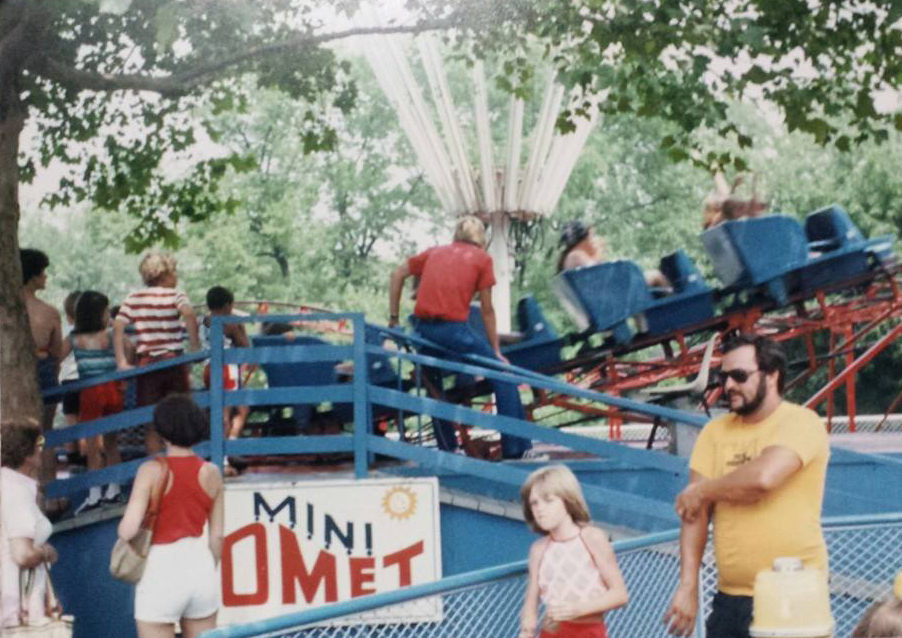
Mini-Comet was Hersheypark's first kiddie coaster. It operated from 1974 to 1978.

Roller coasters formerly located in Hersheypark
Coaster	Season opened	Season closed	Manufacturer	Type/Model	Ref(s)
The Wild CatFormerly The Joy Ride (1923-1934)	1923	1945	Philadelphia Toboggan Company	Wooden roller coaster	
Toboggan (#1)	1972	1977	Chance Manufacturing Company	Steel Swiss Toboggan coaster	
Toboggan (#2)	1972	1977	Chance Manufacturing Company	Steel Swiss Toboggan coaster	
Mini-Comet	1974	1978	B.A. Schiff & Associates	Kiddie roller coaster	
Roller Soaker	2002	2012	Setpoint	Water coaster	
Wildcat	1996	2022	Great Coasters International	Wooden roller coaster	

Roller coasters which were cancelled
Coaster	Season intended for opening	Manufacturer	Type/Model	Ref(s)
Flying Turns	1942	Philadelphia Toboggan Co.	Bobsled roller coaster	
Turbulence	2005	Interactive Rides	'Frequent Faller' drop coaster	

== Past thrill rides ==
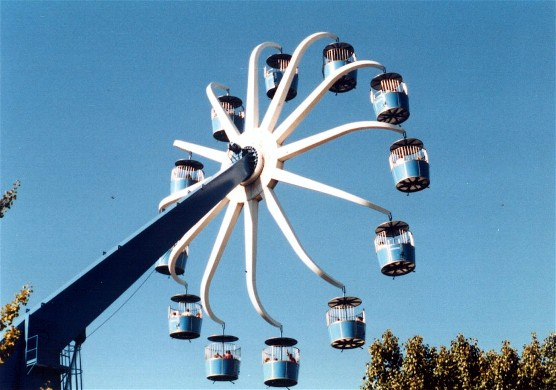
Giant Wheel, a double wheel

The first major ride Hersheypark purchased was a small, used Herschell-Spillman Company carousel, in 1908. This ride was always referred as a merry-go-round rather than a carousel. The ride operated from June 1908 through at least 1912. It was placed adjacent to a ballfield, one of the main attractions in the park at the time, and above the pool area, which was located below the ballfield in the hollow along Spring Creek. This location was chosen for the carousel because Milton S. Hershey, who founded the park, wanted to have a miniature railroad operate in the park. The miniature railroad would connect the main entrance of the park (nearest to downtown Hershey and the train station serving the area) with the west end of the park where the carousel was.

The Miniature Railroad was the second major ride Hersheypark purchased. It debuted in September 1910, and the grand opening occurred in May 1911. The railroad would operate from 1910 to 1971, with the east station (located at the main entrance of the park) remaining the same throughout the line's history. The west station was relocated twice - first in 1930 when it was moved into the hollow, the year after the pool was relocated and Mill Chute was constructed, and a second time in 1950, when the line was truncated due to the installation of twin Ferris wheels. Hersheypark was gated in the 1971 season, and put a portion of the Miniature Railroad outside of the gate - the segment between the east station and the 1929 Hershey Park Pool. The ride was closed during the 1971 season and never reopened; the track was eventually lifted and the train was put into storage.

Hersheypark debuted a second carousel manufactured by the Denzel Carousel Company in June 1912. This carousel was larger, and was a newly built ride instead of being used. It was originally located in the west end of Hersheypark, near where the current main entrance of the park is located. Hersheypark called this ride Carrousel, misspelling the word carousel with two r's. In 1929, the carousel was relocated to a platform overlooking Comet Hollow, where it operated through the 1944 season. In 1945, Hersheypark had the opportunity to install a Philadelphia Toboggan Company carousel; they sold the Dentzel carousel and installed the PTC ride, which operates in the park to this day.

Hersheypark has had a variety of other thrill rides which no longer exist in the park today. The full list of these rides is below.

Thrill rides formerly located in Hersheypark
Ride	Season opened	Season closed	Manufacturer	Description	Ref(s)
Carrousel (1908)	1908	1912	Herschell-Spillman Company	This was the first ride that was purchased for the park. Purchased used, this ride was always referred as a merry-go-round, rather than a carousel.	
Miniature Railroad	1910	1971	Ernest H. Miller	A narrow-gauge railway, and was the second ride purchased for the park. It did not open until the very end of the season in 1910, due to construction delays.	
Carrousel (1912)	1912	1944	Dentzel Carousel Company	The Carousel had 52 animals and 2 chariots. This Carrousel is still in operation and can be found today at Knott's Berry Farm in Buena Park, California.	
Skooter	1926	1931	Lusse Brothers	This was the first bumper car ride the park had. It was located near where the current bumper cars, Fender Bender stands. It was replaced by the Auto Skooters, which was located in Comet Hollow.	
The Pretzel	1931	1963	Pretzel Ride Company	An indoor dark ride, converted into the "Gold Nugget" in 1964. It was eventually converted into a shooting gallery. The building was torn down following the 1977 season and replaced with a new building that housed the Fender Bender bumper cars as well as a child's version (lower level) called the Auto Skooter and later, a different kiddie ride called Rolling Rovers.	
The Bug	1933	1981	Traver Engingeering Company	A larger version of the still present Ladybug (now called Misfit Bug). Existed where Wave Swinger is today.	
Custer Car Ride	1936	1945	Custer Manufacturing Company	An electric-powered car ride manufactured by the Custer Company. The ride was located where Comet is today, having been installed behind the funhouse Whoops. The ride was removed to make way for the addition of Comet.	
The Whip	1937	1975	Mangels Company	A Mangels whip, it was located originally near the entrance to where the SooperDooperLooper is located today, and parallel to the loading-unloading station for the Electric Train. In 1973 it was moved to the area where Flying Falcon used to operate. After the 1975 season, the ride was removed, and Mini-Comet put in its location. In 1977, Himalaya was moved to the same location, and Mini-Comet was shifted slightly south of the Himalaya. A similar ride existed in the Midway America section of the park until the end of the 2022 season, and a picture of the original whip could be found in the ride area of said similar attraction, as well as one of the twin Ferris Wheels.	
Auto Skooters	1938	1977	Philadelphia Toboggan Co.	The second bumper cars ride the park had, it was located in Comet Hollow. The building still stands as the Hollow Famous Famiglia which serves pizza and other Italian food. Ice cream and Skyrush Slush is also served at the building's side windows.	
Aerial Joy Ride	1941	1961	Norman Bartlett	Bought from the New York's World Fair after it closed. It cost $25,000 (equal to $574,525 today). Replaced by Klaus AeroJets (now Starship America) in 1962. It was located where the Music Box Theater and Mr. B's Recording Studio is today.	
Cuddle Up	1947	1977	Philadelphia Toboggan Co.	It is similar to the spinning tea cup rides at Disneyland and Walt Disney World, except that the whole platform remained stationary. The ride was replaced by a coal themed version of the same ride called the Coal Shaker. The ride was located where the Frog Hopper and Red Barron children's rides are today. The old Wildcat roller coaster station was originally located slightly behind this area where the Convoy children's ride is located today.	
Twin Ferris Wheels	1950	1974	Eli Bridge Company	Two side-by-side Eli Bridge Company Ferris wheels which were 66 feet tall. The rides operated in Comet Hollow and was replaced by Himalaya. The space is currently the location of SooperdooperLooper's station.	
Turnpike	1960	1973	Streifthau Manufacturing Company	The Turnpike was installed in Comet Hollow and ran in an area now filled by a portion of Storm Runner. The loading station was located across from the Carrousel pavilion, and crossed the creek in two different spots. The cars were Streco Turnpike Cruisers built by Streifthau. The ride was otherwise designed by the Hershey Estates, through the Hershey Lumber Products division. A number of cars were damaged in the 1972 flood, but the ride survived through the 1973 season; the bridges used for the Turnpike course are seen in photographs from 1974 being used as walking bridges for pedestrian use.	
Flying Coaster	1964	1972	Norman Bartlett	A Norman Bartlett-designed ride. The last known operating model is at Kennywood. It operated in what is currently the Minetown section of the park, in what is now a midway.	
Gold Nugget	1964	1972	Outdoor Dimensional Display Co.	Formerly The Pretzel, this was an indoor dark ride. It was converted into a shooting gallery beginning for the 1973 season, making it a game rather than a ride. The building was torn down following the 1977 season and replaced with a new building that housed a kiddie auto scooter and the Fender Bender bumper cars ride.	
Skyview	1966	2025	Universal Design Limited	A round-trip cable car ride, the station was located in Founder's Way, right next to the Minty Bees and the Misfit Bugs. It operated similar to the Sky Ride (which was demolished 34 years earlier), except it had one rather than two stations guests could depart and embark at.	
Tip-Top	1966	1979	Frank Hrubetz & Company	A sit-down spinning ride, it was first installed in Comet Hollow after the Hershey Park Theatre and Laughland were torn down. In 1969, it was relocated in front of the Gold Nugget / Gold Nugget Shooting Gallery to clear space for the Magic Carpet Giant Slide.	
Paratrooper	1967	1979	Frank Hrubetz & Company	A paratrooper ride, where the Hersheypark Amphitheater stands today.	
Round Up	1968	1977	Frank Hrubetz & Company	A stand-up, circular spinning ride, it was located in front of the Gold Nugget / Gold Nugget Shooting Gallery in what is today Founders Way.	
Magic Carpet Giant Slide	1969	1972	Aero Mar Plastics	A large slide, it was removed after the 1972 season. It was located where Hersheypark Amphitheater currently stands. A similar ride, Merry Derry Dip, used to stand adjacent to Laff Trakk.	
Rotor	1970	1994	Chance Rides	The Rotor was added in 1970. After it was removed in 1995, it was replaced by the Tilt-A-Whirl, which was moved from Carrousel Circle. That, in turn, was replaced in 2012 by Skyrush.	
Monster	1972	1983	Eyerly Aircraft Company	A spinning Octopus style ride with sets of four spinning cars that were situated at the end of each "tentacle". It was replaced by Tilt-a-Whirl.	
Giant Wheel	1973	2004	Waagner-Biro	An Intamin-supplied ride replaced by the relocated Balloon Flite and Starship America rides following the 2004 season.	
Sky Ride	1974	1991	Giovanola/Intamin	Transported riders on 30 cars between Rhineland and Minetown, with over 1,268 feet between each station. The Rhineland station is now used as a stage for character greets and was formerly stroller rental in 2019 (formerly Central PA's Kosher Mart before that), and the Great Bear's station now exists where the Minetown station once stood. The ride now operates at Dreamworld Park in Thailand and is called Cable Car.	
Himalaya	1975	1989	Reverchon	A Reverchon Himalaya. Originally located beside what is now the Hollow Famous Famiglia near where the Twin Ferris Wheels once were. The ride was moved in after the 1976 season (due to the SooperdooperLooper station being built there for the 1977 season) and was rebuilt in the general vicinity of, what is, as of 2015, the Flying Falcon ride and park entrance to ZooAmerica.	
Coal Shaker	1978	1989	Philadelphia Toboggan Co.	This replaced Cuddle Up, which had been in the park for 30 seasons. It was in a very similar style to Cuddle Up, also with coal-themed cars. When the ride was removed in 1989, it was replaced by several kiddie rides – Convoy, Red Baron and Dinosaurs-Go-Round; Dinosaurs-Go-Round was eventually relocated to another area of the park and Frog Hopper took its place.	
Flying Bobs	1978	1982	Allan Herschell Company	Replaced the Twin Towers Toboggans. When it was removed, it was replaced by Balloon Flight. Mini-Himalaya currently occupies the same space.	
Rodeo	1978	2008	Chance Rides	Originally named "Trabant". Rodeo was located at the present location of Cocoa Cruiser. Rodeo was moved to Pioneer Frontier in 1988 after removal of the Timber Rattler. Moved to Dutch Wonderland. It also spent time at Lake Compounce while that park was owned by the Hershey Entertainment & Resorts Company.	
Former name: Trabant	1978	1987	Chance Rides	Originally named "Trabant". Rodeo was located at the present location of Cocoa Cruiser. Rodeo was moved to Pioneer Frontier in 1988 after removal of the Timber Rattler. Moved to Dutch Wonderland. It also spent time at Lake Compounce while that park was owned by the Hershey Entertainment & Resorts Company.	
Cyclops	1980	2002	HUSS Maschinenfabrik	A Huss Enterprise, replaced by The Claw following the 2002 season. The ride currently operates at Calaway Park, near Calgary, Alberta, Canada.	
Conestoga	1984	2002	Arrow-Huss	A Huss Rainbow, it operated in Pioneer Frontier. The park removed the ride following the 2002 season, and was replaced by the Frontier Virtual Theater. That was replaced by a ride, The Howler, in 2008. Hersheypark sold the ride to Lake Winnepesaukah.	
Timber Rattler	1984	1987	Schwarzkopf	A Schwarzkopf Polyp ride. Replaced two years later by the Rodeo ride (generic name "Trabant").	
Frontier Meeting House	1987	1989	Arrow Dynamics	Sharing the same building and the replacement for Cinemavision, the Frontier Meeting House was a special effect "turning room" attraction constructed in fall 1986 and winter 1987. It operated for three seasons. Due to low ridership, and difficult maintenance issues, the ride was scrapped and sold to an amusement park in China. The building is now known as the Playdome Arcade.	
Flying Falcon	1990	2016	Huss	Four arms suspend falcon-themed cars which spin in a sideways orientation, rising up to 100 feet (30 m) in the air. It was closed on September 5, 2016. The letter "F" from the light-up sign that appeared at the top of the ride can be found today on the patio of The Chocolatier. It has since been relocated to Niagara Amusement Park & Splash World, where it remains in storage.	
Chaos	1999	2005	Chance Rides	A Chance Chaos in Midway America. Replaced with Coastline Plunge in 2007, though the ride was removed following the 2005 season.	
Reese’s Xtreme Cup Challenge	2006	2018	Sally Corporation	The first competitive, interactive dark ride. Replaced by Reese’s Cupfusion in 2019.	
Whip	1997	2022	Rideworks	This was the first standard Whip in the park since 1976. It was brought back in 1997. It used to exist in the Midway America section of the park but was removed at the end of the 2022 season.	

== Past and cancelled water rides ==
Water rides formerly located in Hersheypark
Ride	Season opened	Season closed	Manufacturer	Description	Ref(s)
Shoot the Chute (1914)	1914	1923	Hershey Improvement Company	This was a toboggan slide ride that was added to the original pool in the park. It was used through the 1923 season, when the slide was removed and replaced by a newer version. The slide stood 50 feet tall and did not have any humps.	
Shoot the Chute (1924)	1924	1928	Hershey Improvement Company	This was the second toboggan slide for the park's original pool. The original's wood was in need of replacement so a new slide was constructed. This slide was painted white and had a hump.	
Mill Chute	1929	1962	Philadelphia Toboggan Co.	Early dark ride with a water splashdown, located alongside Spring Creek near the area of the Wave Swinger. The ride was redesigned in 1963 as "The Lost River," and while the ride was essentially the same with new theming, the park considered it a new ride. The ride was destroyed in 1972, a result of flooding from Tropical Storm Agnes. The park's Coal Cracker ride was designed with some similarities to the Mill Chute.	
Bike Boats	1931	1941	Custer Specialty Company	This was a Custer Paddle-About paddle boat ride. It operated in Spring Creek in 1931, one of several different kinds of boat rides to be used in the creek.	
Giant Toboggan Slide	1931	1941	Hershey Improvement Company	This was a toboggan slide that replaced the original Shoot the Chute. When the original pool was closed, the toboggan slide was not replaced. The popularity of the old slide caused this version to be built in a small pool that was only accessible by walking through a tunnel underneath Hershey Park Ballroom (the ballroom was south of the 1929-71 pool). The slide was operated through the 1941 season, and did not reopen in 1942 due to America's entry into World War II. The slide remained closed until it was torn down in 1947. The pool for the slide was converted into a children's pool.	
Speedboat	1933	1941	Chris-Craft Boats	This was a speedboat ride Hershey Park installed as part of the 30th anniversary celebration of the town of Hershey; it opened in August, rather than at the beginning of the summer season. It operated on a section of Swatara Creek, about one mile north of the Hershey Park Pool, at the corner of Park Boulevard and West Derry Road. This was the only thrill ride to operate on Swatara Creek, outside the current boundaries of modern Hersheypark property. This was operated through the 1941 season and did not reopen in 1942 due to America's entry into World War II.	
Lucas Motor Boat Ride	1949	1971	Lucas Company	This was a Lucas Company kiddie motor boat ride in a water trough. It was ordered in November 1948 from Harry Travers. It installed when Kiddieland was opened in 1949. Not definitively known when it was removed, however it was likely removed when Carrousel Circle was built following the 1971 season.	
Lost River	1963	1972	Outdoor Dimensional Display Co.	In 1963, the Mill Chute was redesigned by Bill Tracy, of the Outdoor Dimensional Display Company, becoming the "Lost River," a jungle themed concept. While the ride itself was essentially unchanged, jungle theming was added to the ride. The park considered the Lost River a new ride. In 1972, flooding from Tropical Storm Agnes overwhelmed the banks of Spring Creek. The flood brought a large amount of mud into the station, tunnel and hill of the ride. The damage to the ride was too much to be repaired. The ride closed in June 1972.	
Paddleboats	1982	2006	Sun Dolphin	An Additional Charge ride where riders paddled along Spring Creek. The ride was removed after the 2006 season.	
Canyon River Rapids	1987	2008	Intamin AG	A river rafting ride that soaked guests with waterfalls. Canyon River Rapids was removed for the 2009 expansion of the Boardwalk, which consisted of a wave pool and lazy river. Many of its old boats now are used on the Raging Rapids ride at Kennywood.	
Frontier Chute-Out	1988	1998	New Wave Rides	This ride contained a pair of winding water-tubes known as "Slidewinder" and "Pistol Pete's Plunge". The complex was renovated in 1998 and became Western Chute-Out. The slides were renamed as well.	
Western Chute-Out	1999	2007	ProSlide Technology	Frontier Chute-Out was renovated following the 1998 season. The slides were replaced with slides built by ProSlide Technology. The ride was renamed from Frontier Chute-Out to Western Chute-Out. "Pistol Pete's Plunge" was renamed "Straight Shooters" and "Slidewinder" was renamed "Winding Rivers." After the 2007 season, the ride was removed to make way for Fahrenheit.	
Tiny Timbers	1989	2013	Venture Rides	A miniature log flume kiddie ride in Music Box Way. Boats went around a trough, and went down a 7 foot hill at the end. It was removed after the 2013 season to make room for Cocoa Cruiser, a kiddie roller coaster.	
Tidal Force	1994	2026	Hopkins Ride	A splash-down ride with a 100-foot (30 m) drop. The splash was powerful enough to reach visitors passing by on the walkways. It is currently in the process of being removed since September 7th, 2026. This closure comes with a announcement from Hersheypark, which included two new water play areas and 45 new aquatic elements.	

Water rides which were cancelled
Ride	Season intended for opening	Manufacturer	Description	Ref(s)
Belt-driven Boat Ride	1971	Arrow Development	This was a ride proposed for the 1971 season which was never installed. A down payment was placed on the ride in 1970, and the ride was revived as part of the second Rhineland expansion in the R.Duell renovation plans. Due to economic and budget concerns, the second Rhineland expansion was cancelled. The ride would have operated on Spring Creek.	
Rhine River Boat	1973	Arrow Development	This was a ride proposed for the 1971 season which was never installed. A down payment was placed on the ride in 1970, and the ride was revived as part of the second Rhineland expansion in the R.Duell renovation plans. Due to economic and budget concerns, the second Rhineland expansion was cancelled. The ride would have operated on Spring Creek.	
Shoot-the-Chutes	1986	Intamin AG	This was a 6 person boat shoot-the-chutes ride in a round raft that went through a winding course and up several lifts. The ride failed to receive necessary local approvals to be installed. As a result, this ride was canceled, and the Intamin river raft ride the park named Canyon River Rapids was installed in 1987.	

== Past kiddie rides ==
Kiddie rides formerly located in Hersheypark
Ride	Season opened	Season closed	Manufacturer	Description	Ref(s)
Aeroplane Swing	1926	1960	Allan Herschell Company	A kiddie airplane swing ride, it was one of the first kiddie rides the park purchased. It was in the park through at least the 1950 season.	
Ferris Wheel (1926)	1926	1960	Allan Herschell Company	This operated near where the Skyview loading station is today. Installed as one of the first two kiddie rides in the park in 1926, it was removed following the 1960 season. It co-existed with a second kiddie ferris wheel for two seasons, which was installed in 1959.	
Sailboats	1929	1975	Allan Herschell Company	This was the first of several kiddie boat rides the park operated, a covered boat carousel-like ride on a track. Located in Kiddieland, it was operated first approximately where Swing Thing is located today. In 1961, it was relocated to the spot where Ladybug operates today. Following the 1975 season, it was removed and replaced by Ladybug.	
Former name: Motor Boats	1929	1960	Allan Herschell Company	This was the first of several kiddie boat rides the park operated, a covered boat carousel-like ride on a track. Located in Kiddieland, it was operated first approximately where Swing Thing is located today. In 1961, it was relocated to the spot where Ladybug operates today. Following the 1975 season, it was removed and replaced by Ladybug.	
Automobile	1935	1975	Allan Herschell Company	This was an automobile carousel kiddie ride with 10 cars, manufactured by Allan Herschell Company. The ride was removed following the 1975 season when the kiddie rides in the former Kiddieland area of the park, near where the Fender Bender is today, were reorganized. The ride sat in an area that is now a midway, next to where the Ladybug kiddie ride is today.	
Horse and Buggy	1949	1971	Allan Herschell Company	A kiddie horse and buggy ride similar to the current Pony Parade at the park. It was ordered in November 1948 from Harry Travers. It was installed when Kiddieland was opened in 1949.	
Miniature Train	1952	2014	Miniature Train Corporation	A miniature train ride that runs in an oval circuit. The ride existed in the park in two eras: in Kiddieland, next to Comet's station where the exit area is, until the park created Carrousel Circle and Der Deitschplatz following the 1971 season, and in the modern era of the park, through the 2014 season when it was removed due to space needed for the roller coaster Laff Trakk. It will be reintroduced in a future season.	
First installation:	1952	1971	Miniature Train Corporation	A miniature train ride that runs in an oval circuit. The ride existed in the park in two eras: in Kiddieland, next to Comet's station where the exit area is, until the park created Carrousel Circle and Der Deitschplatz following the 1971 season, and in the modern era of the park, through the 2014 season when it was removed due to space needed for the roller coaster Laff Trakk. It will be reintroduced in a future season.	
Candylane-only operation:	1983	1995	Miniature Train Corporation	A miniature train ride that runs in an oval circuit. The ride existed in the park in two eras: in Kiddieland, next to Comet's station where the exit area is, until the park created Carrousel Circle and Der Deitschplatz following the 1971 season, and in the modern era of the park, through the 2014 season when it was removed due to space needed for the roller coaster Laff Trakk. It will be reintroduced in a future season.	
Second installation:	1996	2014	Miniature Train Corporation	A miniature train ride that runs in an oval circuit. The ride existed in the park in two eras: in Kiddieland, next to Comet's station where the exit area is, until the park created Carrousel Circle and Der Deitschplatz following the 1971 season, and in the modern era of the park, through the 2014 season when it was removed due to space needed for the roller coaster Laff Trakk. It will be reintroduced in a future season.	
Kiddie Turnpike	1955	1967	B.A. Schiff & Associates	A kiddie version of the Turnpike ride at the park, located in the Kiddieland area. Following the 1967 season, it was removed and replaced by a kiddie variety ride.	
Ferris Wheel (1959)	1959	1971	Allan Herschell Company	This operated on the edge of the Ballfield in an area which would be the middle of the Midway connecting Carrousel circle to the ride area surrounding Fender Bender. It was removed as part of Phase I renovations following the 1971 season. The area was converted into Der Deitsch Platz.	
OutBoard Motor Boats	1962	1984	Hampton Rides	This was a kiddie ride added to the Kiddieland area of the park. It was moved to the Minetown area of the park in the 1970s and was placed next to the Mini-Comet kiddie coaster. It remained in that location through the 1984 season. During the following off season, the OutBoard boats were removed from the ride and replaced by "Granny bugs" cars made by Venture Rides. The new Granny Bugs was placed adjacent to the Dry Gulch Railroad station, utilizing the motor and arms of the OutBoard Motor Boats. The area that the MotorBoats sat at was replaced by a food stand, currently called "Just Wing It".	
Wells Cargo	1964	2003	Mangles Company	A kiddie Whip ride manufactured by Mangles, it operated in a variety of places in the park. It was initially near where the Sky View station is, then moved to out front of what was then the Ride Operations office. In 1985, it was relocated to the expanded Pioneer Frontier area. The ride was moved to Dutch Wonderland following the 2003 season and replaced by a food stand.	
Former name: Whipperoo	1966	1985	Mangles Company	A kiddie Whip ride manufactured by Mangles, it operated in a variety of places in the park. It was initially near where the Sky View station is, then moved to out front of what was then the Ride Operations office. In 1985, it was relocated to the expanded Pioneer Frontier area. The ride was moved to Dutch Wonderland following the 2003 season and replaced by a food stand.	
Former name: Kiddie Whip	1964	1965	Mangles Company	A kiddie Whip ride manufactured by Mangles, it operated in a variety of places in the park. It was initially near where the Sky View station is, then moved to out front of what was then the Ride Operations office. In 1985, it was relocated to the expanded Pioneer Frontier area. The ride was moved to Dutch Wonderland following the 2003 season and replaced by a food stand.	
Little Red Caboose	1970	1970	Reading Company	A little red caboose was purchased by the park and installed as a ride, costing 10 cents, in 1970. After the 1970 season, it was no longer considered a ride, and the ten cent cost removed.	
Earthmovers	1976	2002	Allan Herschell Company	Originated as "Tiny Tanks" before being refurbished into a bulldozer ride in 1980. Replaced by the Mini Pirate. Moved to Dutch Wonderland.	
Former name: Tiny Tanks	1976	1979	Allan Herschell Company	Originated as "Tiny Tanks" before being refurbished into a bulldozer ride in 1980. Replaced by the Mini Pirate. Moved to Dutch Wonderland.	
Mini-Skooters	1978	1995	Lusse Brothers	Kiddie bumper cars. Replaced with Rolling Rovers when it moved under the Fender Bender.	
Former name: Auto-Skooters	1978	1980	Lusse Brothers	Kiddie bumper cars. Replaced with Rolling Rovers when it moved under the Fender Bender.	
Little Wheel	1983	1983	Eli Bridge Company	This was a trailer mounted model Eli Bridge kiddie Ferris wheel called Little Wheel. It was rented from Jake Inners of Majestic Midways for the park's first Christmas Candylane season. It operated outside the park main gate for that season only.	
Moonwalk	1996	2007	Wapello	This was an air-filled blow up moon bounce ride. The park purchased the ride in 1996, and later placed it in the Midway Fair Tent, when the park added Crazy Climber and Tiger's Tail. The ride was listed on the 2002 and 2003 park maps when the Fair Tent was re-themed as the Midway Clubhouse & Café. After the 2003 season, the ride was only used during Hersheypark's Christmas Candylane event, inside the Overlook Arcade, re-themed for Candylane as Santa's Castle.	
Crazy Climber	2000	2005	PlaySmart, Inc.	This was a jungle gym rope climbing ride. This was located inside the Midway Fair Tent, along with Tiger's Tail and Moonwalk two air-filled blow up rides. The ride was listed on the 2002 and 2003 park maps when the Fair Tent was re-themed as the Midway Clubhouse & Café. Crazy Climber was removed following the 2005 season.	
Tiger's Tail	2000	2007	Leisure Activities	This was an inflatable crawl-through ride. This was located inside the Midway Fair Tent, along with Moonwalk and Crazy Climber. The ride was listed on the 2002 and 2003 park maps when the Fair Tent was re-themed as the Midway Clubhouse & Café. After the 2003 season, it was used during Hersheypark's Christmas Candylane event, along with Moonwalk, inside Santa's Castle (a re-theming of the Overlook Arcade during Christmas Candylane).	

== Past funhouses ==
Funhouses formerly located in Hersheypark
Ride	Season opened	Season closed	Manufacturer	Description	Ref(s)
Funhouse	1930	1937	James A. Fields	Funhouse was the park's first funhouse. It used the former bathhouse of the original Hollow pool (1908-1928). It was made by James A. Fields. In 1938, it was rebuilt into Whoops when Hersheypark added a second funhouse to the park.	
Death Valley Funhouse	1938	1939	Philadelphia Toboggan Co.	This was the park's second of four funhouses. When it first opened, it was named Death Valley Funhouse. It was located in several unused backrooms of Hershey Park Theater. Following the outbreak of World War II in September 1939, the park decided to renovate Death Valley into a new funhouse.	
Whoops	1938	1945	Philadelphia Toboggan Co.	This funhouse was created out of the park's original funhouse. It was manufactured by Philadelphia Toboggan Company. It was closed after the 1945 season because the space was needed for the station of a new roller coaster, Comet. It was replaced with Funland in 1946.	
Laugh Land	1940	1965	Philadelphia Toboggan Co.	The Death Valley Funhouse was replaced with a new version in 1940, called Laugh Land. The funhouse operated through the 1965 season, when Hershey Park Theater and Laugh Land were demolished in the following offseason.	
Funland	1946	1972	Philadelphia Toboggan Co.	Funland opened in 1946, replacing the funhouse, Whoops. It operated until 1972, when it was replaced by the Whipperoo which moved from Comet Hollow. The area where Funland was located is adjacent to the Hershey Triple Tower rides in Kissing Tower Hill, where the entrance to ZooAmerica is today, as well as a customer service building.	

== Past attractions ==
These are attractions which the park had throughout its history. The athletic field was the center of activities when the park first opened in 1906, until the Merry-Go-Round carousel was installed in 1908.

Attractions formerly located in Hersheypark
Attraction	Season opened	Season closed	Description	Ref(s)
Hershey Park Athletic Field	1906	1970	The baseball field actually predates the park itself. The day the park officially opened, a baseball game was played to commemorate the event.	
Hershey Park Pool (1908)	1908	1909	This was the park's first pool, located in what is, as of 2015, The Hollow area of the park. The bathhouse for the pool is approximately where Comet's station is today and was converted into a funhouse in 1930. This pool was made of earthen materials, and was completely replaced within two seasons with a concrete pool.	
Hershey Park Pool (1910)	1910	1911	This was the park's second pool, located in what is, as of 2015, The Hollow area of the park. This is the second version of the pool in this location. Made of concrete, the pool was roughly 100 feet by 50 feet and between three and six feet deep.	
Hershey Park Pool (1912)	1912	1928	This was the park's third pool, located in what is, as of 2015, The Hollow area of the park. On the outset of constructing the new pool, the Park completely demolished the old pool before building the new one. This pool remained in operation through the 1928 season. It was replaced by a much larger pool in 1929, which was located further west of the area. The area where this pool sat was redeveloped and immediately replaced with Mill Chute (see above). The Shoot the Chute toboggan slide was added two years after the pool was built.	
Hershey Park Shooting Gallery	1908	1930	This was a shooting gallery located where Fender Bender is today. It was replaced by The Pretzel, when it was installed for the 1931 season.	
Hershey Park Bowling Alley	1909	1921	The bowling alley was built in 1909 and was located along Park Avenue. The bowling alley, located in the basement of the building it was in, was closed after the 1921 season. The building remained in use until 1945, when it was torn down and replaced by Funland, which opened in 1946. The area of the park it was situated was on a hill; this area gained the nickname "Bowling Alley Hill," at the time. As of 2014, this area of the park is known as "Kissing Tower Hill."	
Hershey Park Bandshell	1910	1972	This is the well known bandshell which stood in the park from 1910 until 1972. The bandshell was going to be re-themed in the Rhineland section of the park; however, due to age of the structure, construction crews determined they could not move the bandshell without severely damaging it. Additionally, the Coal Cracker, which had been purchased by the park in 1971, was going to be installed in the same location of the bandshell for the 1973 season. As a result, the bandshell was torn down, and effectively replaced by Hersheypark Amphitheatre.	
Hershey Park Ballroom	1913	1956	The ballroom opened on May 21, 1913, built by Hershey Improvement Company head James K. Putt. The venue was easily capable of hosting various big bands and jazz bands. This included some of the larger acts during the times the ballroom was open. After the close of the 1956 touring season, the ballroom was completely renovated and was considered a new venue by the park.	
Hershey Park Pool (1929)	1929	1971	This pool was located on the western end of the park, at the intersection of Park Boulevard and Derry Road, across from the Convention Center. The pool was closed in 1971. It was torn down in 1972 when Park Boulevard was relocated, part of Hersheypark's plans to become a theme park.	
Miniature Golf Course and Driving Range	1931	1971	This miniature golf course and driving range was located on Derry Road (today Park Boulevard) on what is now Chocolate World.	
Electric Fountain	1932	1971	This was a fountain located in Spring Creek, in an area of the park known as the Sunken Gardens. The fountain was produced at a cost of $75,000, by General Electric. At the time, this was the second kind of electric fountain General Electric made, their first being in Schenectady, New York.	
Starlight Ballroom	1957	1970	Formerly Hershey Park Ballroom, the building was overhauled and completely renovated; the park considered the Starlight Ballroom a new venue which replaced the Hershey Park Ballroom. It debuted to the public on June 1, 1957. Most significant of all the changes was that a section of the roof was cut out, so people could "dance under the stars." This is where the name for the new ball room originated.	
Fairways Miniature Golf	1960	1970	This miniature golf course was installed on the concrete surface of the outdoor rink next to Hersheypark Arena. It was manufactured by Fairways Miniature Golf Company.	
Little Red Caboose	1971	2013	An antique Reading Railroad caboose, which was originally used for birthday parties, before the park began using it as the "Lost Children's Caboose" in the 1970s. The Little Red Caboose was removed from the park following the 2013 season and donated to the Reading Railroad Heritage Museum.	
Dancing Waters	1973	1974	A light show and water pageant, performed on Spring Creek across from the Comet. This was installed after the 1972 season, replacing the Lost River which had been damaged beyond repair in the flood of 1972. This was a jeux d'eau water display and a continuation-in-name-only of the Electric Fountain display in the Sunken Garden, closed after 1971. Dancing Waters is a specific type of water show, sold by Harold Steinman, which is based on a European version created by Otto Przystawik. 19 motors powered the water, propelling the water jets from a varied height between 15 and 150 feet in the air. There were over 1,800 jets of various sizes. The show was removed after the 1974 season, and the location is currently occupied by the loop of Great Bear.	
Gold Nugget Shooting Gallery	1973	1977	After the 1972 season, the Gold Nugget dark ride was converted into a shooting gallery and named Gold Nugget Shooting Gallery. The building was demolished and replaced by the Fender Bender bumper cars after the 1977 season.	
Light Arcade	1973	1979	This was a plaza built in 1973 near the Carrousel in Carrousel Circle. It was re-themed in 1979, as the Starlight Arcade, and was subsequently considered neither part of Carrousel Circle or Rhineland, becoming its own themed area.	
Dogpatch Dawgs	1980	1993	An audio-animatronic band of five dogs that appeared in a gazebo in Pioneer Frontier. The gazebo remained for a number of years, but it was eventually removed.	
Encyclopædia Britannica Booth - Der Deitschplatz	1980	1989	This started out as a park information booth, and then became sponsored by Encyclopædia Britannica. Located where Reese's Xtreme Cup Challenge is today.	
Encyclopædia Britannica Booth - Minetown	1980	1989	This was a park information booth located near Coal Cracker and the Minetown Vittles restaurant.	
Shooting Gallery	1980	1985	This was a shooting gallery located in Rhineland. It was converted into Alpine Arcade, and today is used for the park's Hospitality Services.	
Cinemavision	1982	1985	A theater attraction which was a geodesic-domed theater showing panoramic films on a floor-to-ceiling screen.	
Miniature Golf	1982	1997	A small mini golf course next to the SooperDooperLooper. It was removed to make way for Great Bear, and is different from another miniature golf course that was part of then Hershey Park in the 1950s and 1960s.	
Blacksmith's Shop	1985	2004	Located next to Whistle Stop in Pioneer Frontier. Is currently a face-painting booth.	
Sweetest Parade on Earth	1993	2004	A daily parade of Hershey's characters and musicians throughout the park. It started on July 1, 1993, as part of the 20th anniversary celebration for Chocolate World. The parade was used for the remainder of the season in the park, and continued through the 2004 season.	
Nightlights	2001	2004	A laser light show that took place in Midway America. There were several shows that ran throughout the years, including Halloween (Frightlights) and Christmas (Brightlights) versions. Due to the powerful lasers used in the performance, the park had to get an FAA clearance before every show.	
Frontier Virtual Theater	2003	2007	A virtual reality game, it had three rows of seats where people sat and stomped with their feet, etc. It replaced Conestoga after it was removed following the 2002 season. When it was removed, it was replaced by The Howler spinner ride.	
Haunted Harvest	2004	2004	A Halloween walk-through attraction which featured live actors. Existed in the Wild Cat, Tidal Force and Canyon River Rapids catering areas.	

== Past park regions ==
Hersheypark only began having themed areas in 1972 as park management was converting the park into a contemporary theme park. However, the park did have one specific area with a theme in years prior - Kiddieland. Since then, the park has had 20 different kinds of named areas within the park, some which were considered official themed areas and others which were not.

One example is when Hersheypark renovated an area of the park around the Comet and Spring Creek. The Bug was replaced with Wave Swinger and the area beautified. The area was also given a name: Spring Creek Hollow. However, since the area didn't gain any theming, only beautified, the park did not list it the themed areas of the park (such as Rhineland or Tower Plaza).

=== Former themed areas ===
Themed areas formerly located in Hersheypark
Theme area	Season opened	Season closed	Description	Ref(s)
Sunken Garden	1932	1971	This was an area of the park along Spring Creek that had been underwater prior to 1931. Hershey Park replaced the dam located in that area of the park which formed Spring Lake. The new dam was located a few hundred feet to the east of the original dam, resulting in a smaller lake. The area that was now dry was converted into a walkthrough garden area, which the park named Sunken Garden, since it had previously been "sunken." This area of the park remained in use until the end of the 1971 season, when the park developed several new themed areas as part of its renovations project. The Sunken Garden was in a fenced off area, providing no access for guests. It remained that way until 2012, when Hersheypark opened a pathway along the former route of the Miniature Railroad, to alleviate traffic from the then-new roller coaster, Skyrush.	
Kiddieland	1949	1971	This was kiddie ride area located near Hersheypark Arena that was first opened in 1949. Two of the first major kiddie rides was a water ride and a horse and buggy ride. The Kiddieland themed area was eliminated after the 1971 season, and later became part of the Music Box Way themed area of the park.	
Animal Garden	1972	1980	This was a themed area that effectively replaced Hershey Park Zoo, which shut down operations in 1971. It was somewhat a petting zoo, though not all animals could be petted. Once ZooAmerica opened in 1978, this area remained for two seasons. When it was closed following the 1980 season, it was converted into Kids Stuff.	
Der Deitchplatz	1972	1989	A showcase for local Pennsylvania Dutch artisans, including blacksmith, glassblower, weaver, spinner, and leather worker. Located in and around the Craft Barn.	
Carrousel Circle	1972	2004	This area was created as part of Phase I of the renovations to Hersheypark. Opening in 1972, the centerpiece of the area was the park's carrousel. Following the 2004 season, the area was renovated, and converted into Founder's Circle.	
Rhineland	1973	2013	This area was located directly inside the main gate of the park. This area featured German theming as part of the 1970s renovation plans of the park. Following the 2013 season, this was merged with Tudor Square, Founder's Circle and Music Box Way to form Founder's Way.	
Tudor Square	1973	2013	This area was located between Tram Circle and the main gate of the park. This is the only themed area outside the park gate. It had an English regal theme, and the main gate was called Tudor Castle. Following the 2013 season, Tudor Square was merged with Rhineland, Founder's Circle and Music Box way to form Founder's Way.	
Tower Plaza	1975	1989	This was the area in front of the Kissing Tower entrance and exit, as well as the entrance of the Twin Turnpike, and the area by the entrance to ZooAmerica. It was originally intended to be built where the Overlook Arcade and Restaurant is today, in 1974. However, the area was delayed by one year and opened in 1975, in the location it is today. It was absorbed into the Minetown themed area that was formed in 1990. The main entrance of the park was located in this area from the park's first season in 1907, through the 1970 season.	
Kids Stuff	1981	1985	After the 1980 season, the Animal Garden was removed and replaced with Kids Stuff, a play area for the kids.	
Kaptain Kids Kove	1986	1990	Kids Stuff was renovated following the 1985 season and converted into Kaptain Kids Kove. The themed area was closed following the 1990 season when Sidewinder was constructed on the site of Dry Gulch Catering. That catering area was relocated to where Kaptain Kids Kove was.	
Comet Hollow	1990	2011	This was a themed area of the park which came about in the 1990 season. While not specifically themed, the area was named, along with Music Box, to give each area of the park a name to use as reference. This area was renamed "The Hollow" in 2012 when the area was renovated when Skyrush was constructed.	
Minetown	1990	2013	This was a themed area originally planned as part of the renovation of Hersheypark in the 1970s. However, due to budget cuts and difficult economic times, this themed area was never created until 1990, when Sportland, the park's oldest building, was torn down and replaced by the larger Minetown Arcade and Restaurant, and Coal Shaker and Himalaya were replaced with several new rides. This area encompassed Tower Plaza, a themed area surrounding Kissing Tower, as well as an area which was informally called "Contemporary" themed area under the renovation plans of the 1970s.	
Music Box Way	1990	2013	This area encompassed the original Kiddieland area of the park. It was created when Pioneer Frontier was created to its north. It was merged with Tudor Square, Rhineland and Founder's Circle, following the 2013 season, to create Founder's Way.	
Founder's Circle	2005	2013	This area, created following the renovation of Carrousel circle after the 2004 season, featured a variety of rides, mostly kiddie rides. The centerpiece remained the park's carrousel. Following the 2013 season, Founder's Circle was merged with Tudor Square, Rhineland and Music Box Way, to form Founder's Way.	

=== Former named areas ===
Non-themed, named areas formerly located in Hersheypark
Area	Season opened	Season closed	Description	Ref(s)
Contemporary	1975	1989	This area of the park is where Minetown Restaurant and kiddie rides are located today. While not an official theme, that area of the park was intended to remain modern, and not connected to the Tower Plaza theming, or the planned Minetown theming, which was to be focused around Coal Cracker. This area of the park was defined when Tower Plaza was added, and remained in place until the Minetown renovations occurred following the 1989 season.	
Starlight Arcade	1979	2002	This was a plaza located near both Carrousel Circle and Rhineland, making it its own themed area. The Starlight Arcade was originally the Light Arcade (see above). On July 7, 1979, it was redeveloped into the Starlight Arcade. The Osmond family were the first to be honored; the family put their hand-prints in cement along with a bronze plaque with their name and signatures. Other celebrity hand-prints and signatures were subsequently added as they played in the park or at Hersheypark Arena or Stadium. This includes the Harlem Globetrotters, Mickey Mouse, and Santa Claus. It was replaced with a statue Milton S. Hershey. When this happened, this area became part of Founder's Circle. There is one remaining cement hand-print saved from the attraction, however, next to the operator's booth at the Flying Falcon.	
Spring Creek Hollow	1982	1985	The comet hollow area of the park was renovated in the 1982 when The Bug was replaced by Wave Swinger. Paddleboats (removed 2006) was installed at the former canoe dock underneath sooperdooperLooper, which had a separate fee along with the miniature golf course located on the opposite side of the hollow. This area was themed Spring Creek Hollow, but that theme quickly disappeared, giving way to the Comet Hollow theme which existed through the 2011 season.	
Odyssey Alley	1982	1983	This was the area of the park later known as Music Box Way.	

== Past characters ==
As a part of the adding a gate and one-price admission to Hersheypark, costume characters were now a part of the park's entertainment program. Since the beginning of this, there have been characters based on different Hershey products. These have gone through multiple design changes throughout the years. In addition to these, Hersheypark had its own mascot characters in the late 1970s and 1980s. These included the Furry Tales, which were three brightly colored animals - a skunk, a bear, and a chipmunk. These characters were featured in promotional materials, daily shows, and even had their own shop selling plush toys in Rhineland. Other discontinued characters include Pistol Pete and the rare character Kaptain Kid.

== See also ==
- List of Hersheypark attractions
