= History of Hersheypark =

Theme park history

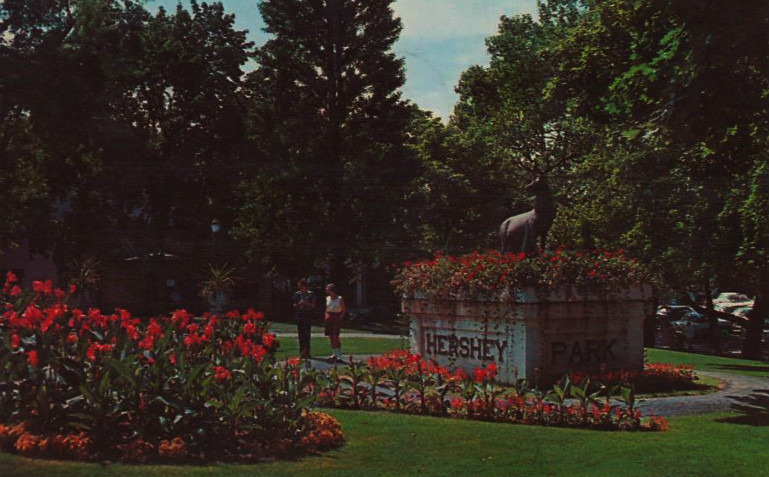
The original entrance of Hersheypark, from 1961.

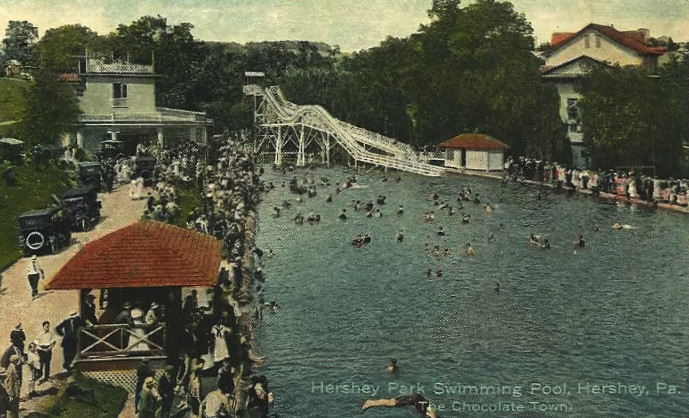
The original pool at Hersheypark, which existed from 1911 through 1928, was located in what is today Comet Hollow.

The history of Hersheypark begins with the founding of the town of Hershey in 1903. Milton Hershey, the owner of the Hershey Chocolate Company, surveyed a nearby area of land, which was to become a leisure park for the employees of his chocolate company. People began visiting the grounds of the future park in 1904 and 1905, while the park's first pavilion was built in the fall of 1905. The park was formally opened on May 30, 1906, when it opened as Hershey Park. The park slowly added rides until 1923, when the first roller coaster, the Wild Cat, was built. From then on, rides were regularly added, except during World War II. The park was redeveloped into Hersheypark in 1970, through a multi-phase project. Since then, it has added ten roller coasters, expanded to over 110 acres, and features many other attractions including shows with sea lions, well-known acts including Weird Al Yankovic and Duff Goldman from Charm City Cakes in the Hersheypark Amphitheater, and a short-lived laser light show.

== 1903-1906: The formation of the town and park ==
On January 26, 1903, it became publicly known that Milton S. Hershey made the decision to build a chocolate factory on the farms to the south west of Derry Church and Spring Creek, Pennsylvania. Hershey acquired over 400 acres of land in his initial purchase, which also included water rights to Spring Creek. The land straddling along Spring Creek, and the land north to nearby Union Deposit, was not included with the initial purchases. Having control of the water rights to Spring Creek, Hershey gained control of Brecht's dam, which was to be "converted into a lake for boating and other purposes of recreation for the town and Mr. Hershey's employes [sic]."

In mid-1904, Hershey offered a $100 prize to the person who suggested "the most suitable name" for the new town. The prize was awarded to Mrs. T.K. Doyle of Wilkes-Barre, PA on September 1, her submission being Hersheykoko. The name wasn't to take official effect until mid-1905. However, by that time, the "koko" part of the name fell out of use and on June 1, 1905, the newborn town was officially named Hershey. At the same time, Hershey and several business partners, involved with the chocolate company, created the Hershey Trust Company, which would become the owner of the future amusement park after Hershey's death in 1945, and the Hershey Improvement Company, which would later be merged with the park and other non-chocolate related operations to form Hershey Estates.

With the chocolate factory and the relocation of the Hershey Chocolate Company to Hershey completed in June 1905, construction of infrastructure in the town began to accelerate, and development of a recreational park began. In the fall of 1905, a pavilion was constructed on an area of town designated as West End Park, or more commonly, Hershey Park; this was the area of the designated park grounds Hershey already owned - he was intending to purchase the remainder. It was just the hill that formed the southern side of the hollow which Spring Creek ran through. The pavilion, constructed by James Putt, was built on the northern edge of the hill, which provided an overlook view of the hollow and surrounding area. The pavilion was completed before the winter season took hold, as to be ready for the opening of the park in 1906. At the same time, Harry Haverstick, Hershey's gardener, was tasked with preparing walkways, trees and other plant life for the winter season, also to be prepared for opening the park in the spring of 1906.

In February 1906, Hershey purchased the land from John H. Nissley which is known as Hersheypark today: the purchase included the land straddling Spring Creek in the hollow, as well as all but a few tracts of the land from the north side of Spring Creek all the way to Swatara Creek in nearby Union Deposit. Today, this land encompasses where the Giant Center, Hersheypark Arena and Stadium, as well as the former air park which is parallel to Hersheypark Drive. In March 1906, the athletic field was surveyed out by the players for the Hershey baseball club, a field which remained in that spot until the construction of Carrousel Circle in the winter of 1972.

== 1906–1970: Hershey Park ==
=== 1905–1922: The early years ===
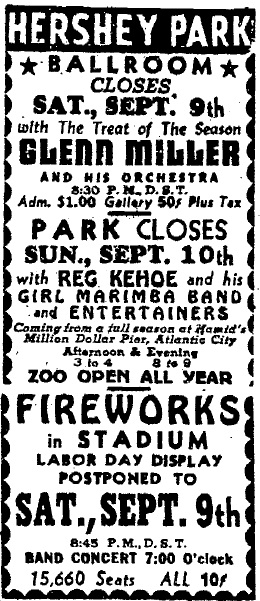
An advertisement for Hershey Park from 1939

The original park was a simple nature park featuring Spring Creek, gorgeous landscaped gardens, and many walking paths for his citizens. He also added a structure for entertainment like dancing and roller skating, and helped institute a community band to perform there. The family-oriented park included children’s playgrounds, picnic pavilions, and baseball and athletic fields added in 1905. Spring Creek soon became a scenic boating lake. The park was a beautiful place in nature for all to enjoy, and even had impressive nighttime lighting. Hershey, PA’s growth and increased visitors to the town instilled a need for the park to evolve into an amusement park. A trolley was instituted in the place, as well as the park’s first ride in 1908: a used carrousel and band organ, and an amphitheater followed in 1909. Soon, the park began expanding each year. The carrousel, bandstand, and restaurant were enlarged in 1912, and a Convention Hall followed three years later. The very first roller coaster, Wild Cat, was introduced for the 20th anniversary, and the amusement park fad in the 1920s added a bumper cars ride and the Mill Chute water flume. After this period, although the Great Depression cast its shadow on the park, more new attractions and the Hershey Arena and Stadium were added.

=== 1923: The Wild Cat ===
To celebrate the town of Hershey's twentieth anniversary, Milton Hershey ordered a roller coaster from the Philadelphia Toboggan Company (PTC). Hershey chose not to purchase the roller coaster, but rented the land that the ride was built on to PTC. The ride opened on June 23, 1923, as the Joy Ride. It was changed to Wild Cat several years later and operated through the 1945 season when it was torn down and replaced by Comet.

=== 1924–1945: To the end of an era ===
A small Ferris wheel and the Airplane Swing were the first two kiddie rides added to the park, both in 1926. The Skooter were added to the park during the 1920s. In 1929, a complex of four swimming pools was added, and the original pool was drained. Because that space was opened up, the old bath house was converted into a funhouse (later called Whoops) and The Mill Chute was installed. Despite the Great Depression, Hershey Park flourished. In 1931, the park's first dark ride, the Pretzel, was opened. In 1933, a penny arcade and a circular ride called the Bug, were installed. A petting zoo soon followed. Renovations were made to the Wild Cat roller coaster in 1935 to build up the dips and to more steeply bank the curves.

An ad Hershey Park placed in Billboard Magazine, July 8, 1944, putting their Dentzel carousel for sale.

The 1937 season saw the addition of a Mangel's Whip, which was called Whipperoo. In 1941, Hershey Park bought a ride from the New York World's Fair, which was an instant success when it opened. They called it the Aerial Joy Ride, and it marked the last ride the park added until 1945. Due to the United States entrance into World War II, and the subsequent war rationing, the park was prohibited from adding new rides or attractions. The Hershey Park Zoo shut down in 1942 as a result of the war as well (and it did not reopen until 1950).

In 1943, Hershey Park remained closed for almost the entire season due to the gas shortages related to the war. This was the first time the park hadn't been open on Memorial Day or the Fourth of July. The park remained closed until September 18, when it opened with a show in the Hershey Park Ballroom starring musician Bobby Sherwood. It was the last time the park hadn't been open on either holiday.

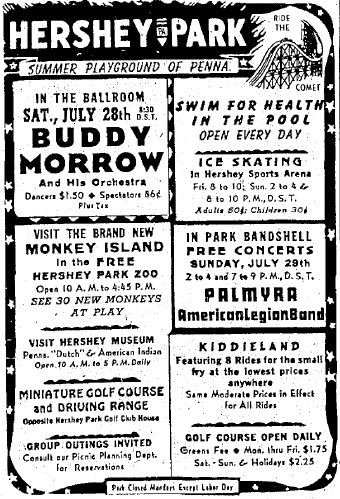
An advertisement for Hershey Park from 1956.

However, the park was able to maintain the rides it had, so they remained in relatively good condition. However, Wild Cat was declining throughout the period, and once the war ended, Hershey began to look for the next roller coaster. In the 1944 season, the park reached an agreement to purchase a used carousel built by PTC in 1919. (It still operates in the park today, with music from a 1926 Wurlitzer model #153 Military Band Organ.) The carousel was the last ride Milton Hershey purchased and saw in operation as he died that year. However, he had reached an agreement with PTC to build a new roller coaster to replace Wild Cat for the 1946 season. It would be the largest roller coaster in the nation.

=== 1946–1959: Post Milton Hershey, World War II growth ===
In 1946 the wooden roller coaster Comet replaced Wild Cat. It was Milton Hershey's last purchased ride before he died. In 1949, the park added a new section to the park, called Kiddieland. Kiddieland featured 7 kiddie rides, including two new ones: a Kiddie Horse and Buggy ride and a Lucas Motor Boat ride. Twin 66-foot (20 m)-high Ferris wheels were added the following season in 1950. In 1952, the park added a kiddie ride called Miniature Train. The ride still operates in the park, As of 2011. After a few seasons of not adding rides, a kiddie Turnpike was added in 1955.

Hersheypark in 1955

Thrill rides
| Adult rides | Year installed |
|---|---|
| Miniature Railroad | 1910 |
| Mill Chute | 1929 |
| The Pretzel | 1931 |
| The Bug | 1932 |
| The Whip | 1937 |
| Auto Skooters | 1938 |
| Aerial Joy Ride | 1941 |
| Carrousel | 1945 |
| Comet | 1946 |
| Cuddle Up | 1947 |
| Twin Ferris Wheel | 1950 |

Kiddie rides
| Name | Year installed |
|---|---|
| Ferris Wheel | 1926 |
| Airplane Swing | 1926 |
| Sailboats | 1929 |
| Automobiles | 1935 |
| Horse and Buggy | 1949 |
| Lucas Motor Boat Ride | 1949 |
| Miniature Train | 1952 |
| Kiddie Turnpike | 1955 |

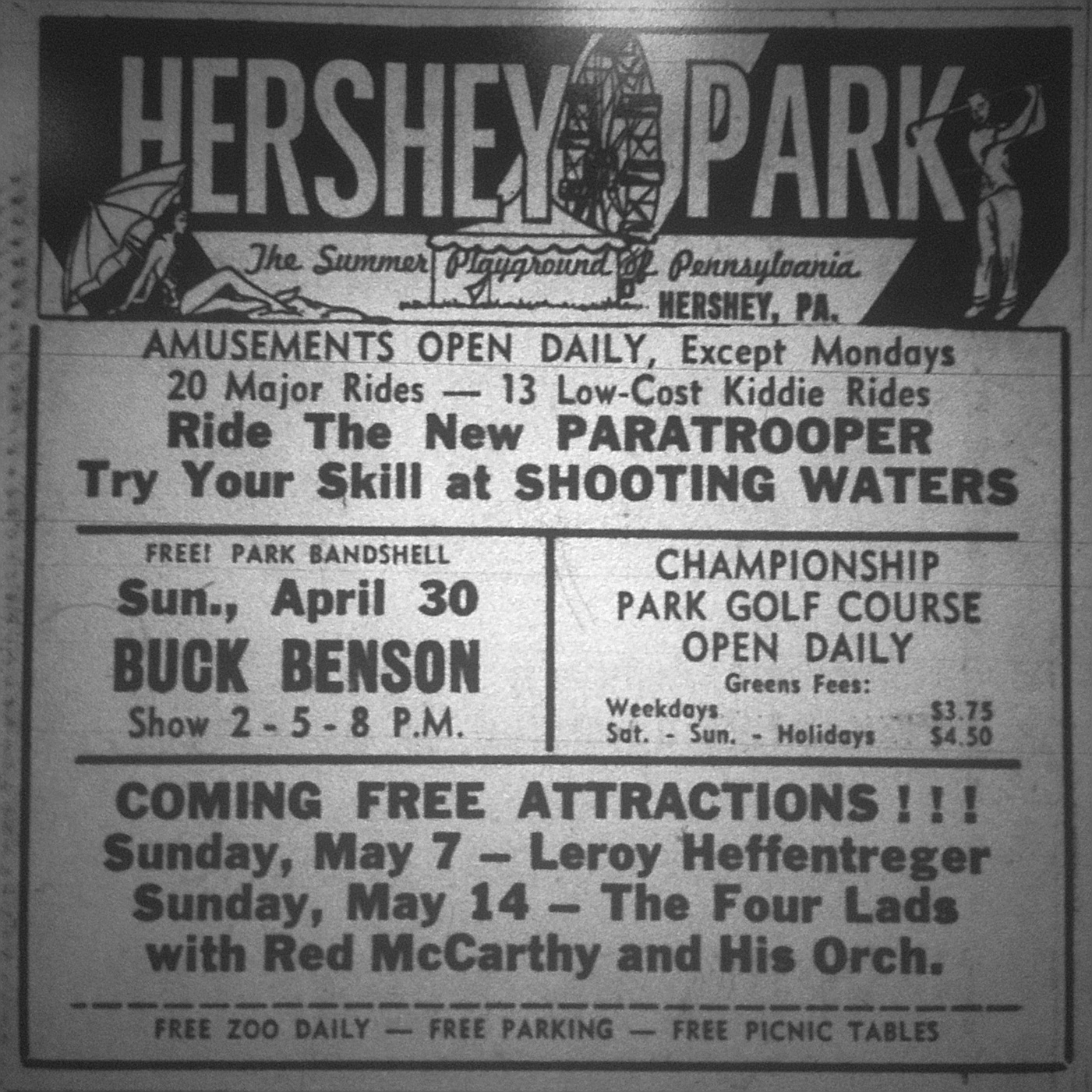
An advertisement for Hershey Park, 1967.

=== 1960–1970: Decline of the park ===
Despite the growth of the park in the immediate years following World War II, it began to slow down after the addition of Kiddieland in 1949. From 1950 through 1959 the park only added four rides, and it was a full decade after the Twin Ferris wheels were installed that Hersheypark added its next adult ride: Turnpike. The Dry Gulch Railroad was added a season later in 1961, a complement to the 50-year-old Miniature Railroad. The former featured a live steam powered 4-4-0 locomotive, named "Nellie", built for the park by Crown Metal Products. In 1962, the park replaced the Aerial Joy Ride with Starship America, which is still in the park as of 2011. In 1964, the park added a kiddie ride, Wells Cargo, and a thrill ride, Flying Coaster, located near the main entrance of the park. In 1965, the park added a number of kiddie rides to Kiddieland, including Dizzy Drums, Traffic Jam, Helicopters and Space Age. Skyview and Tip-Top (later removed in 1980) were installed in 1966. The Monorail was added in 1969. In 1970, the Rotor was added.

Despite these investments, the park's overall decline continued, with decreasing staff members, resulting in more litter and vandalism, the latter particularly increasing due to the park's ungated layout. The park would require a far more extensive investment, essentially a complete redevelopment, in order to avoid closure...

So starting with the 1971 season, they chose to reimagine the park.

== 1971–present: Hersheypark ==
=== 1971: Gating the park ===
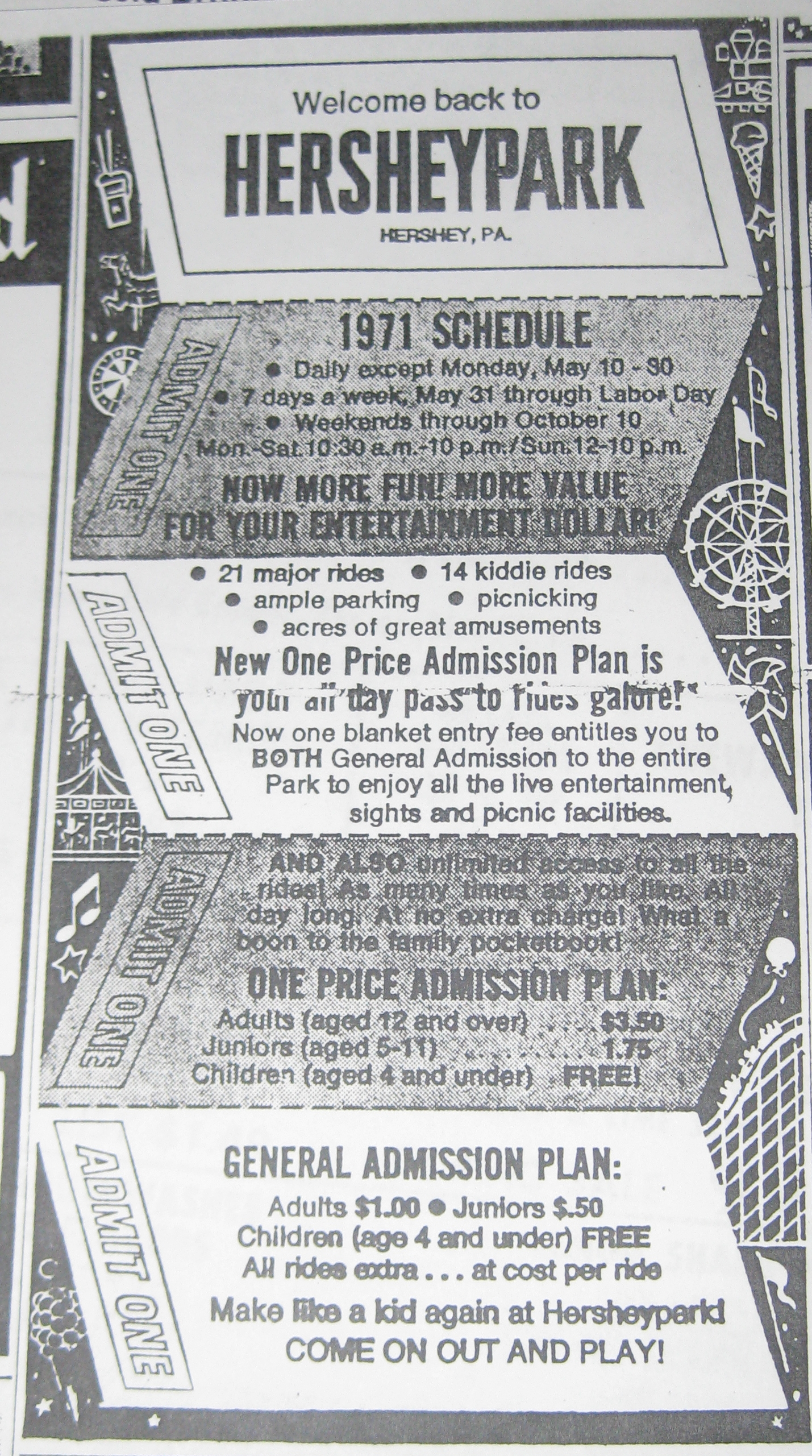
An advertisement for Hersheypark from May 5, 1971

A five-year redevelopment plan was started in 1971 to convert the regional amusement park Hershey Park into a large theme park called Hersheypark, as it is known to this day. This five-phase project was orchestrated by Randall Duell. The park was gated in 1971, and a one-price admission plan was started, which coexisted with a pay-as-you-ride general admission policy. The initial price for the one-price admission plan was $3.50 for "adults" (ages 12 and up), or $1.75 for "juniors" (ages 5–11). Children ages 4 and under entered for free. The general admission plan charged "adults" $1.00 to get through the gate, "juniors", $.50, while children ages 4 and under were free. This plan allowed people to enjoy live entertainment and any non-ride facility; if they wanted to ride rides, they had to purchase tickets just like any season prior. This was the only season the park had the general admission plan.

Another significant change to the park was the main entrance. Since 1907, it had been located at the intersection of Park Boulevard and Park Avenue. For the 1971 season, there were five entrances to the park. They were located at: Main entrance of Hersheypark Arena, near where the current (as of 2016) entrance of the park is, the athletic field (near Founder's Way as of 2016), the Miniature Railroad and across from the old Hershey Park Zoo (both in locations where Twin Turnpike stands as of 2016).

=== 1972: Phase I ===
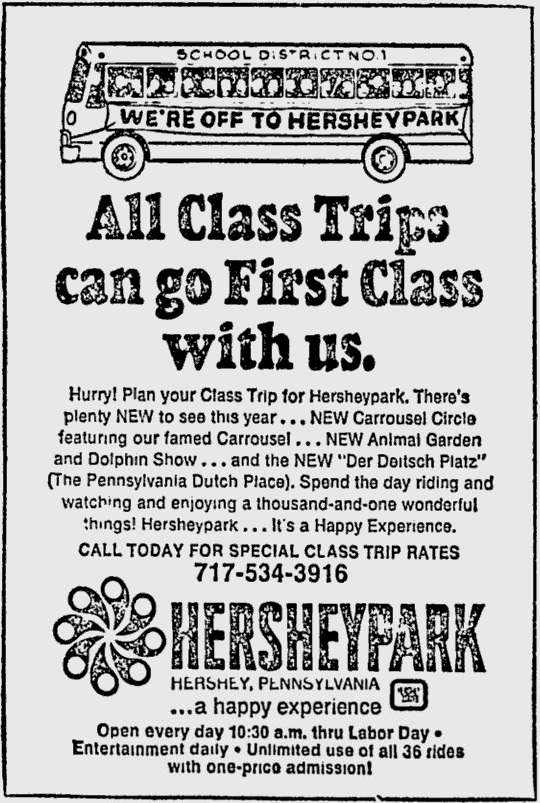
Advertisement for Hersheypark from April 16, 1972, in the Pittsburgh Press

In 1972, the first phase of redevelopment was completed. This included the addition or relocation of a number of rides. Three new areas were constructed: Carrousel Circle, Der Deitsch Platz (The Pennsylvania Dutch Place) and the Animal Gardens. Der Deitsch Platz featured a Pennsylvania Dutch theme while the Animal Gardens was a petting zoo and replaced the old Hershey Park Zoo. Neither of these areas included any rides.

Carrousel Circle built to the west of Der Deitsch Platz and between Hersheypark Arena and Comet, which had been the site of a baseball field dating back to 1905, featured several new rides and a mixture of kiddie rides and adult rides. The Carrousel which had been sitting along Spring Creek in Comet Hollow was moved to the center of the circle, and rides were built around it. Three rides were relocated from the old kiddieland area: Space Age, Helicopters and Traffic Jam (then known as Motorcycles). Two new small rides were purchased: Scrambler and Monster. The biggest ride was Hersheypark's second roller coaster (third built, overall): Toboggan. (Toboggan was later removed following the 1977 season.) These rides were placed next to Comet, in the area of where the grandstands had been. The opposite side, closest to Hersheypark Arena, remained undeveloped.

At the start of the season, Hersheypark announced the five-phase plan to the public, which was published in a special section of the Patriot News on Sunday, May 7, 1972. A number of themed areas were planned throughout the course of the project. Some would come to fruition while others would not. Projects that didn't happen were the result of natural disasters and the gas crises of the 1970s. However, other things were announced, including that the parking area more than doubled in size and that the park was starting a "sunset savings plan" where you could save one dollar off the price if you entered the park after 6 pm.

During the 1972 season, the park experienced a flood resulting from the rains of Hurricane Agnes. Until the Tropical Storm Lee flood in 2011, it was the worst flood the park experienced. A number of rides were damaged, and the only severely damaged ride was the park's first log flume, Lost River (originally called Mill Chute), which never reopened.

=== 1973: Phase II ===
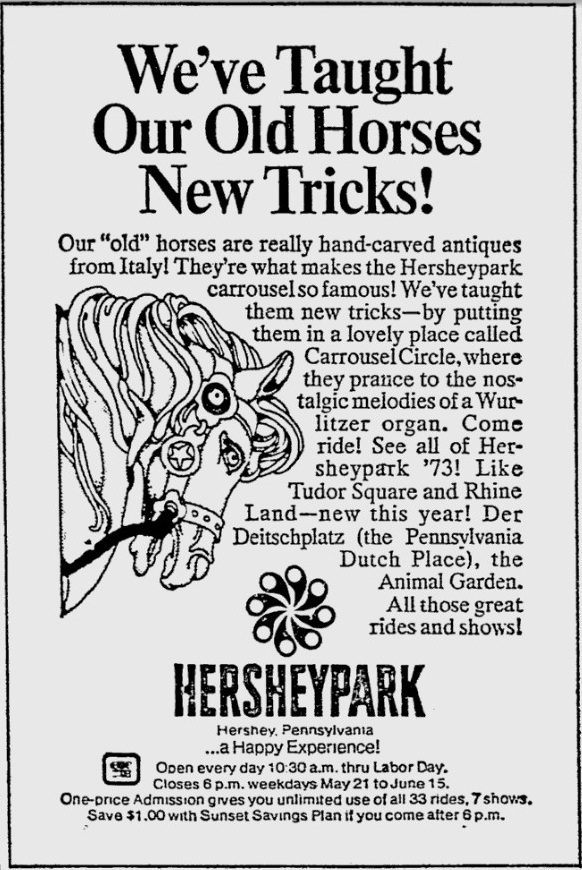
Advertisement for Hersheypark, June 10, 1973, in the Reading Eagle

Phase 3 of construction included building themed areas Tudor Square and Rhineland, divided by the permanent main gate of the park. Coinciding with that project was Hershey Chocolate Company's plans to build Chocolate World near the park's new main gate. Both Phase 3 and Chocolate World opened in 1973. As a result of Phase 3 plans, it was decided that the section of Derry Avenue between Park Boulevard and Park Avenue should be closed, and Park Boulevard redirected, as well. This decision was made as part of the park's expansion plans, as well as the incoming Chocolate World.

Coal Cracker opened in 1973, replacing the Mill Chute. It was built by Arrow Development Corporation, and was the first hydroflume ride. Also new for 1973, the Sky Ride. Designed as a transport ride, one station was located in Rhineland, while the other station was located behind the penny arcade, next to Coal Cracker.

Following this season, the plan to renovate Hersheypark was modified. Most plans for a variety of themed regions (such as a Colonial Frontier region, a Minetown region, and a Native American region) were cancelled. Plans for 1974 were modified such that Kissing Tower and Twin Turnpike installations being delayed to 1975.

=== 1974–1977: Modified Renovation Plan ===
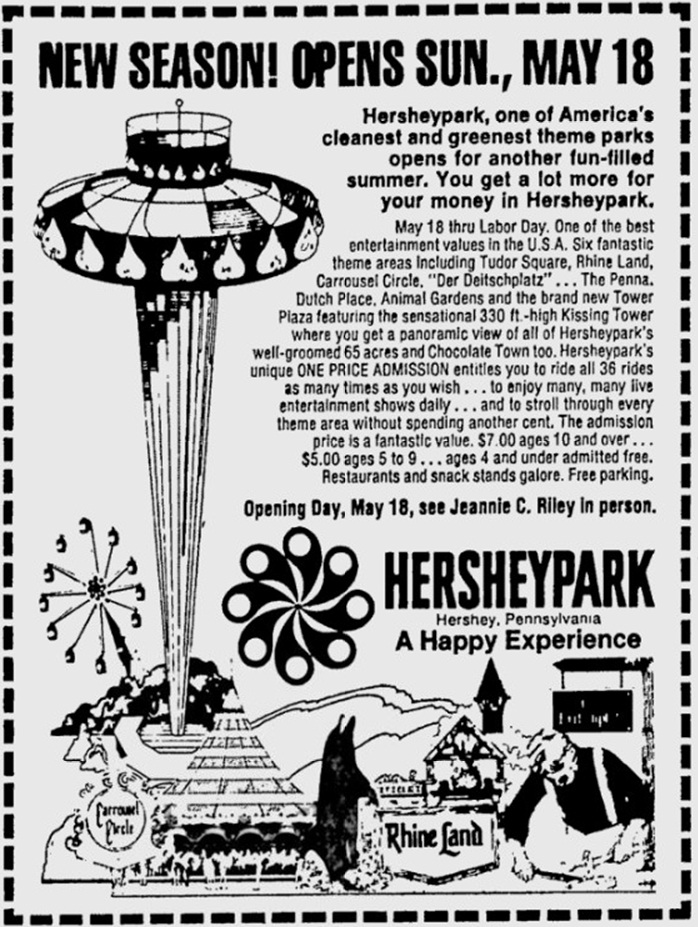
Advertisement for the new Kissing Tower from May 16, 1975.

Trailblazer, the park's third roller coaster, fourth ever built, opened in 1974. Trailblazer was built overtop part of the Turnpike ride, as well as an old parking lot for the park. The Turnpike may have been planned to be truncated into a shorter route for the 1974 season since the Twin Turnpike was postponed to 1975. A truncated Turnpike appears on a park map that was on a brochure for Hersheypark. However, the Turnpike was removed and not operated in 1974. The Sky Ride was the other ride to debut in 1974, connecting Rhineland to the far end of the park at the Minetown station. This was the last Minetown themed construction in the park until 1990.

In 1975, the Kissing Tower and Twin Turnpike opened in Tower Plaza. Tower Plaza replaced the original entrance area of Hersheypark (1906 - 1970). The Twin Turnpike featured a middle guide rail, which reduced damage to the cars. The main focus of the area where the Twin Turnpike was built was the Kissing Tower, a 330 foot tall tower. Himalaya was also added in 1975, which replaced the old Twin Ferris Wheels. But, Himalaya only operated there through the 1976 season, when it was moved near the Twin Turnpike, which it replaced the old Whipperoo. The ride that was built where Himalaya was, it was the first steel looping roller coaster on the East Coast: sooperdooperLooper, opened on May 8, 1977. That marked the end of the R. Duell & Associates modified redevelopment project in the park, and the next major ride wouldn't be added until Canyon River Rapids debuted in 1987.

=== 1978–1986: Redevelopment complete ===
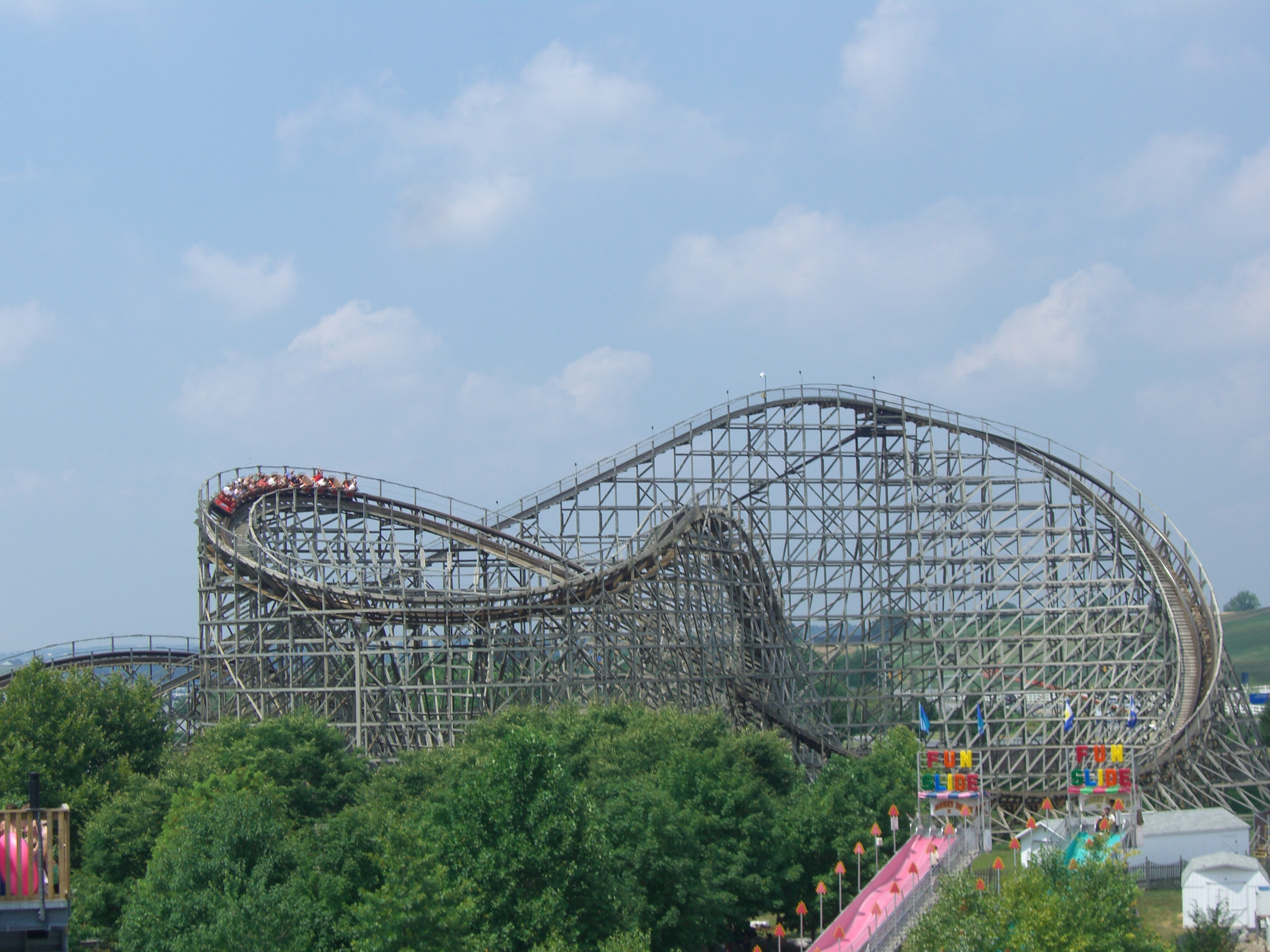
The Wildcat, the park's fifth roller coaster, opened in 1996.

After the addition of sooperdooperLooper in 1977, the growth of the park began to slow down. Old rides continued to be removed and replaced with new ones, however. In 1978, the old Golden Nugget building, which featured a shooting gallery after the ride was removed, was torn down and replaced by the new auto Skooter building and ride, the Fender Bender. Because of the larger size of the building, several neighboring rides were also removed. In 1980, Pirate and Cyclops were installed in an expanded section of the park. It was first expansion of the park gate, as Derry Road was being shut down so the park could expand in that direction. In 1982, the classic ride The Bug, one of the earliest rides installed in the park, was replaced by the Wave Swinger. Several kiddie rides were installed as well, such as the Swing Thing in 1984. The park also expanded further north in 1984, into a new themed section: Pioneer Frontier. The first two rides in this area was Conestoga and Timber Rattler. Dry Gulch Railroad was expanded, with an additional 1000 feet of track, and its engine, "Nellie", which had developed boiler problems, was replaced with a new, similar steam engine named "Skooter" built by the same company. In 1985 and 1986 the park did not install any rides, because Hershey Entertainment & Resorts chose to invest in hotel properties. However, those investments immediately did not do well, which caused no rides to be installed those two years.

Following the 1986 season, the park was to kick off its biggest new ride since sooperdooperLooper, and the first of many new big rides to come to the park, unlike any other era in its history.

=== 1987–1999: Rapid expansion ===
Once Hershey Entertainment & Resorts got the hotel investments behind them, they were able to focus on investing in the park. A new themed area was opened, marking the first significant expansion of the park's foot print: Pioneer Frontier. Canyon River Rapids was built and added in 1987. Western Chute-Out, a set of water slides, was added in 1988.

The 1990s started off with the creation of Minetown. The old penny arcade was replaced by a massive three-story building, housing the Minetown Arcade, Minetown Restaurant, and games. The Flying Falcon replaced Himalaya, and three kiddie rides replaced the Coal Shaker. Four roller coasters were added to Hersheypark in the 1990s. The Dry Gulch Railroad received a second steam engine, named "Janelle", to complement "Skooter", the former had a similar appearance, but was slightly larger and more powerful than the latter. Sidewinder, a Vekoma Boomerang coaster, was added in 1991. In 1996, the wooden coaster Wildcat was added and was named after the Wild Cat that previously operated from 1923 to 1946. Great Bear opened in 1998, the park's most expensive single ride to date. Wild Mouse opened in 1999. Several rides were also added during this decade. In 1994 the water plunge ride Tidal Force opened. A Ferris wheel and Whip ride were added in 1997. Four other new rides were added in 1999. These include the Merry Derry Dip fun slide (since removed), Music Express, Chaos (since removed), and the Frog Hopper.

=== 2000–2006: Landlocked ===
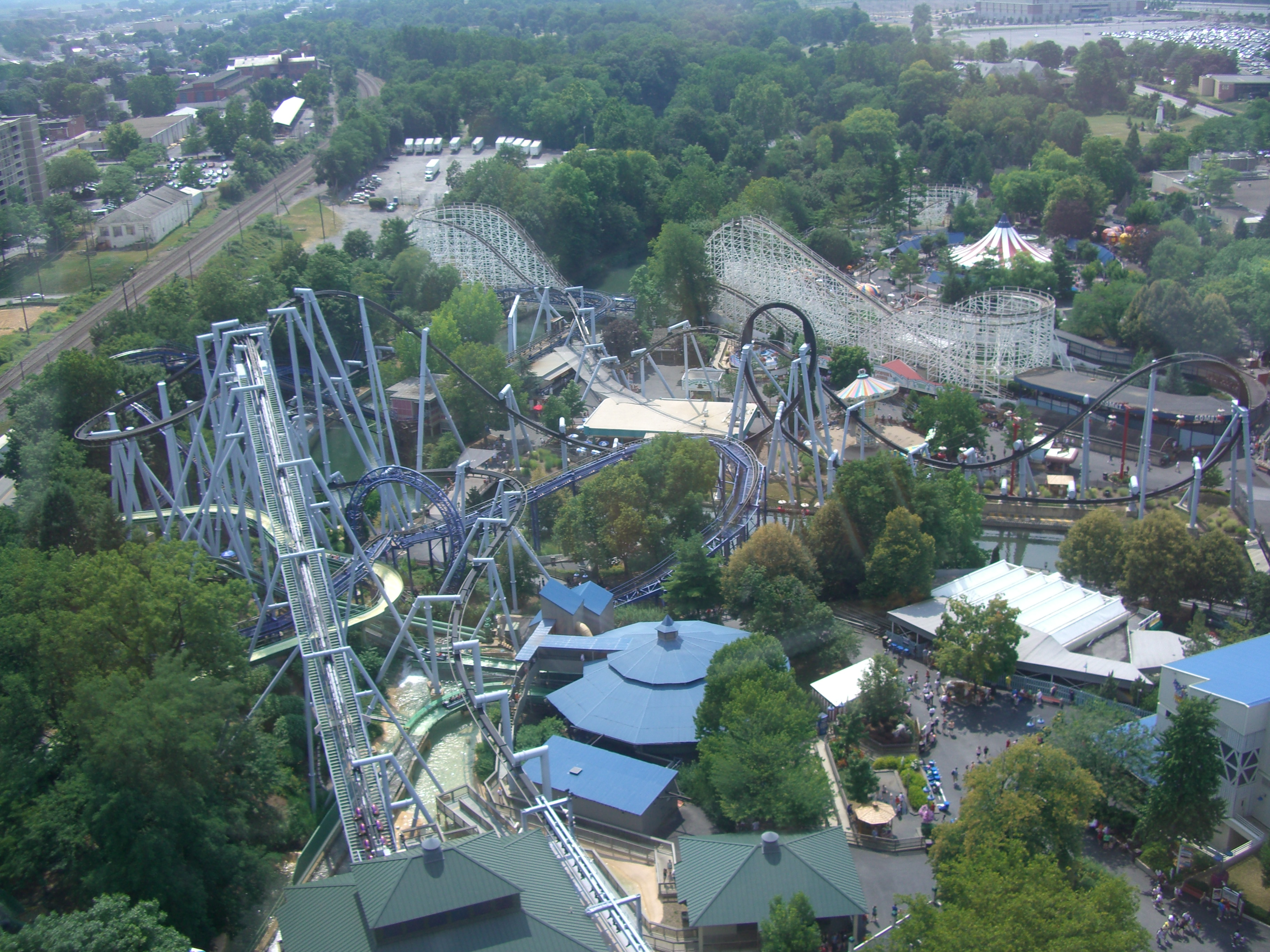
Minetown and Comet Hollow areas of Hersheypark as seen from the Kissing Tower, 2007.

The year 2000 brought the biggest roller coaster of Midway America: Lightning Racer. Hersheypark's first roller coaster of the 21st Century was Roller Soaker, in 2002, which completed Midway America. A 65-foot (20 m) spinning pendulum ride called the Claw was added in 2003. Another roller coaster was added in 2004: Storm Runner, Hersheypark's 10th and tallest (at 180-foot (55 m) feet maximum height), until Skyrush was built in 2012. In 2005, Giant Wheel was removed and replaced by two classic rides—Balloon Flite and Starship America. Carrousel Circle, the first of the 1970s renovations of Hershey Park (now renamed Hersheypark), was remodeled into Founder's Circle in honor of original founder Milton S. Hershey. In 2006, Hersheypark introduced the Reese's Xtreme Cup Challenge, the first interactive dark ride to have two cars compete against each other.

=== Addition of water park ===
In 2007, Hersheypark celebrated its 100th anniversary. A fireworks show occurred every weekend, and as another aspect of the celebrations, Hersheypark opened the Boardwalk at Hersheypark, a water park and themed area. The area filled in the remaining grass area of Midway America. East Coast Waterworks, a water play area, Coastline Plunge, four water slides, a FlowRider called Waverider, a kiddie wave pool called Bayside Pier, and Sandcastle Cove, a kiddie water play area were opened. Roller Soaker and Tidal Force were included in the new themed area, as well as Canyon River Rapids, which would be removed following the 2008 season. With the opening of the Boardwalk, the Canyon River Rapids and Tidal Force queues had their entrances and exits rerouted.

Following the 2007 season, the Western Chute-Out water slides were removed, as Coastline Plunge had effectively replaced them that season. In Chute-Out's place, Fahrenheit, Hersheypark's 11th roller coaster, built by Intamin of Switzerland. When it opened, it held the record for steepest drop at a 97-degree angle (commonly referred to as a negative drop).

In March 2008, the Hershey Entertainment Complex was certified as "storm ready" by the National Weather Service. This is awarded to communities and organizations/companies that are prepared for severe weather. The certification was based on emergency procedures, evacuation plans and evacuation shelter capability. The complex contains an extensive system of closed circuit television security cameras, trained security personal and extensive weather spotting and detecting systems.

In 2009, a new section of the boardwalk was opened, replacing Canyon River Rapids. It was nicknamed "the SeaQuel" and featured two major water rides - a wave pool, the shore, and a lazy river, called the Intercoastal Waterway. The SeaQuel also included the addition of cabanas which was an additional cost for use. The cabanas entrance forced the removal of Rodeo from the park and its relocation to Dutch Wonderland. As of 2011, the boardwalk was home to six games, eleven retail centers and thirteen food concessions.

=== 2010s: Skyrush, Hershey's Triple Tower, Breaker's Edge and Whitecap Racer ===
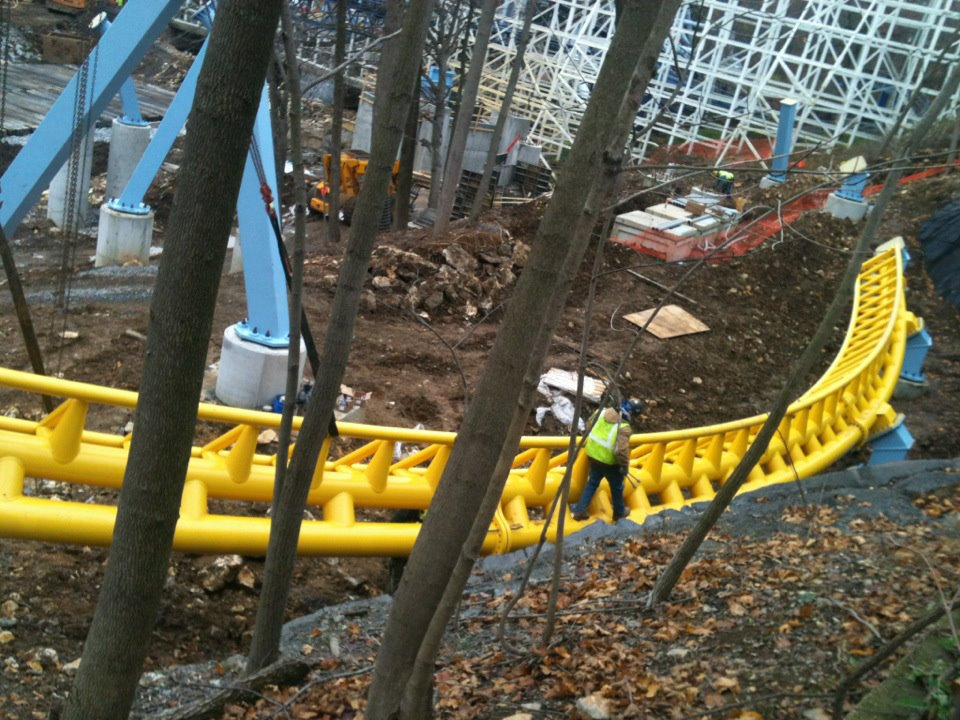
Skyrush under construction.

On August 2, 2011, Hersheypark announced their 12th roller coaster, Skyrush, which debuted in May 2012. Skyrush and the 2012 season also brought back an abandoned area of the park, previously known as the Sunken Gardens.

In June 2011 it was reported that Derry Township, HE&R, and local transportation planners were examining the possibility of realigning Park Boulevard, which ran along the park's southwestern border, in order to allow a 31-acre (13 ha) expansion of the park. This would represent the first expansion in over a decade, as the park is hemmed in on all sides by roads, parking lots, and other entertainment facilities, and would increase the park's acreage by about 25%. In this plan the park would absorb land that was previously the site of the Parkview Golf Course, another Hershey Entertainment property, which closed in 2005. Such a project is not likely to begin for several years and would not be completed for at least a decade. It turned to be the Chocolatetown expansion in 2020.

On August 2, 2016, it was announced that a new attraction will open in 2017 named Hershey Triple Tower. It will be located at Kissing Tower Hill. Three kiddie rides were relocated. The Flying Falcon Ride was closed and demolished after Labor Day 2016. Hershey Triple Tower opened on April 8, 2017 for Springtime In The Park. On the same day Hershey Triple Tower was announced, a Chick-fil-A restaurant was also announced, and it opened on the same day as the new ride.

On August 8, 2017, it was announced that two new Boardwalk attractions were coming in 2018. Two water slides would be added named Breaker's Edge and Whitecap Racer. Breaker's Edge is a hydromagnetic water coaster showcasing "flying saucer" turns and utilizing the former Roller Soaker's (closed in 2012) station & Hersheypark's 14th coaster, despite it being a water attraction for The Boardwalk. Whitecap Racer would be the world's longest "mat racer" water slide featuring six chutes and two helix tunnels. Both attractions opened in late May 2018, with Breaker's Edge being the evidently more popular of the two, with wait times reaching 2 hours at times.

On August 2, 2018, it was announced that a new dark ride attraction would open in 2019 called Reese's Cupfusion, in which riders would defend the Reese's factory from evil candies attempting to prevent the world from having Reese's products. This attraction replaced Reese's Xtreme Cup Challenge, which opened in 2006. It closed on September 3, 2018.

=== 2020s: Chocolatetown and Wildcat's Revenge ===
For the 2020 season, Hersheypark introduced a new entrance area known as Hershey's Chocolatetown, located between the original entry plaza area and the nearby Hershey’s Chocolate World. The new plaza area will include a large new Hershey branded retail store, an ice cream shop, a huge kettle corn stand along with the largest restaurant in the park that will include a full bar and outdoor patio. Inside, the park also relocated the park’s classic carousel to a new home here, along with adding a Hershey’s Kiss themed fountain. The anchor attraction of Chocolatetown is a Bolliger & Mabillard Hypercoaster named Candymonium. Due to the COVID-19 pandemic, the opening of the park for the 2020 season was delayed to July. This included the opening of Chocolatetown. Milton's Ice Cream Parlor and The Sweeterie Confectionery Kitchen were delayed to April 2021, and The Chocolatier restaurant was delayed until the end of May 2021.

Wildcat closed in July 2022. That November, Hersheypark announced that it was converting the former Wildcat into a hybrid roller coaster called Wildcat's Revenge for the 2023 season.

== Former attractions ==
Over the many seasons the park operated, as in any amusement park, new rides are added to replace older rides that are unpopular or require too much maintenance that it becomes too costly for upkeep. Hersheypark has removed approximately 45 rides and attractions.

=== Hersheypark funhouses ===
Hersheypark has had 3 funhouses, none of which are currently standing.

==== Fun House ====
Fun House was the park's first fun house, built in 1930. The building was originally the bath house for the park's first pool. When the pool was drained, the building was left unoccupied and the Mill Chute was built next to it. In 1930, the park turned the building into what was called "Fun House." When it was renovated in 1938, it was given the name Whoops! In 1945, the park purchased a new wooden roller coaster from PTC. Due to its location and size, Whoops! was torn down. Today, that space is occupied by the Comet station and the midway for Comet Hollow.

==== Laughland ====
Laughland was a Magic Carpet type of fun house built by PTC in Hersheypark in 1938. It was initially called Death Valley Fun House, and in 1940, it was renamed Laughland. Laff Land was originally the back portion of the park's first theater, Hershey Park Theater. Both the Theater and Laff Land were torn down following the 1965 season, and replaced with a flat ride, Tip-Top.

==== Funland ====
Funland was the park's third fun house. It opened in 1946 and was located on the southern hill of the park, next to Park Avenue, across from Hershey Park Zoo. The fun house remained a staple of the park through the 1972 season. However, due to vandalism and maintenance issues, and the park transitioning into a theme park, the fun house was torn down. It was replaced with the Whipperoo which moved from Comet Hollow. In 1977, Himalaya was moved from Comet Hollow to near the same location of Funland, replacing Whipperoo. In 1990, the Himalaya was removed and the Flying Falcon was installed on the opposite side of the entrance to the Hershey Park Zoo (now called ZooAmerica).

== List of general managers of Hersheypark ==
When Hersheypark formally opened on May 30, 1906, Hershey did not have a manager in charge of the park. This continued throughout the first season. In 1907, he promoted Joseph R. Snavely as the first manager of Hersheypark. The current general manager of Hersheypark is Vicki Hultquist.

The general managers of the park were often responsible for overseeing other parts of Hershey Estates (such as Hersheypark Arena, the Hershey Bears hockey club, etc.) in addition to Hersheypark.

List of Hersheypark general managers
| # | Name | Year | | Ref(s) |
| # | Name | First | Last | Ref(s) |
|---|---|---|---|---|
| 1 | Joseph R. Snavely | 1907 | 1911 | |
| 2 | Abraham T. Heilman | 1911 | 1926 | |
| 3 | John Sollenberger | 1926 | 1949 | |
| 4 | George Bartels | 1949 | 1963 | |
| 5 | Lloyd Blinco | 1963 | 1968 | |
| 6 | Stanley Carpenter | 1969 | 1970 | |
| 7 | John T. Hart | 1971 | 1973 | |
| 8 | J. Bruce McKinney | 1973 | 1974 | |
| 9 | Paul L. Serff | 1974 | 1983 | |
| 10 | Jack Silar | 1983 | 1991 | |
| 11 | Franklin Shearer | 1991 | 2001 | |
| 12 | Frank O'Connell | 2002 | 2011 | |
| 13 | Kevin Stumpf | 2011 | Current | |
