= Miniature Railroad (Hersheypark) =

Amusement ride at Hersheypark

Hersheypark
- Coordinates: 40°17′17″N 76°39′25″W
- Status: Closed
- Cost: US$3,150.00 (equivalent to about $110,238 in 2024)
- Opening date: 1910
- Closing date: 1971

Ride statistics
- Attraction type: Amusement ride

The Miniature Railroad was a ride at Hersheypark from 1910 until 1971. The train ran a course along Park Boulevard, near the intersection with Park Avenue, around Spring Creek into Comet Hollow. It was the second ride Milton S. Hershey purchased for his park, after buying a carousel. While the railroad is no longer in operation, the train has been undergoing restoration since 2007, and was first publicly displayed in 2011.

== History ==
=== 1909 - 1970 ===
Milton S. Hershey, owner of what was then called Hershey Park, had made the decision to purchase a carousel for his amusement park in 1908. Hershey decided to place the ride on the western side of the park, a considerable distance from the town center of Hershey, Pennsylvania. As part of placing the ride in that location, he was determined to purchase a transport ride to get visitors of the park from the town center to the carousel. In 1909, Hershey had learned that a small resort outside of Lancaster, Pennsylvania called Peoples Bathing Beach, owned by John B. Peoples, was opening a miniature electric railroad. Hershey went to the bathing beach to see it for himself. Impressed with the ride, he decided to purchase one for the park.

Purchased on May 8, 1909, for a sum of US$3,150.00 (equivalent to $110,238 in 2024), construction of the ride began in July 1910. The ride opened for its first run in September 1910. The ride operated a single track with no switches, which meant the track could only hold one train. When the ride opened in 1910, there was one station located near the intersection of Park Boulevard and Park Avenue, which never changed throughout the remainder of the ride's existence. The other station was located in what is today western Comet Hollow near the carousel and the original pool. When that pool was closed, drained and filled, following the 1928 season, the station in the western end of Comet Hollow was moved to the eastern end of Comet Hollow along the creek, near the entrance of the Mill Chute, a log flume ride. The station remained in that location until 1950, when it was moved to the southern end of Comet Hollow, adjacent to the Comet and parallel to Spring Creek.

=== 1971 ===
Following the 1970 season, Hershey Park began a redevelopment plan which called for the park to become a theme park. Hershey Park was renamed Hersheypark, and the park went through a number of other changes, including removing a variety of old rides. The Miniature Railroad, however, continued to operate despite the addition of the park's gate in 1971. The addition of the gate and the location of the ride placed a portion of the track within the park gate, and a portion of the track outside the park gate. The Comet Hollow station was inside the park, and the Park Boulevard station was outside the gate. Guests of the park could get their hand stamped so they would be able to renter the park by taking the Miniature Railroad back to Comet Hollow.

Towards the end of the 1971 season, the ride fell victim to vandalism. Vandals placed objects on the tracks, which caused the train to derail. The train was damaged and not able to be used for operation. As a result, the ride was placed in storage for the 1972 season. However, the park still wanted to restore and operate the ride. One such concept was developed after the park opened the Rhineland section of the park in 1973. The ride would have been called the Rhineland Express. However, due to the extensive damage done to train, combined with slow economic years in 1973 and 1974, among other plans cancelled, the plan to bring back the Miniature Railroad in some fashion was abandoned, and the ride was never repaired or refurbished.

=== 2007: Restoration ===
Hersheypark celebrated its 100th season in 2007. This sparked an interest in seeing the Miniature Railroad restored. Later that year, Friends of the Hershey Trolley, in conjunction with Hershey Entertainment & Resorts (owner of Hersheypark), announced that they were restoring the Miniature Railroad train. One car was placed on display in 2007, and again in the 2011 Hershey Memorial Day Parade.

=== 2020: Chocolatetown Exhibit ===
In July 2020, Hershey's Chocolatetown, Hersheypark's new entrance and region opened to the public and one of the cars from the Miniature Railroad was put on display in front of Milton's Ice Cream Parlor inside the Hersheypark Supply Co. gift shop. The car was on display until at least the end of November 2022.

== See also ==
- List of former Hersheypark attractions
