= Mill Chute (Hersheypark) =

Former ride at Hersheypark

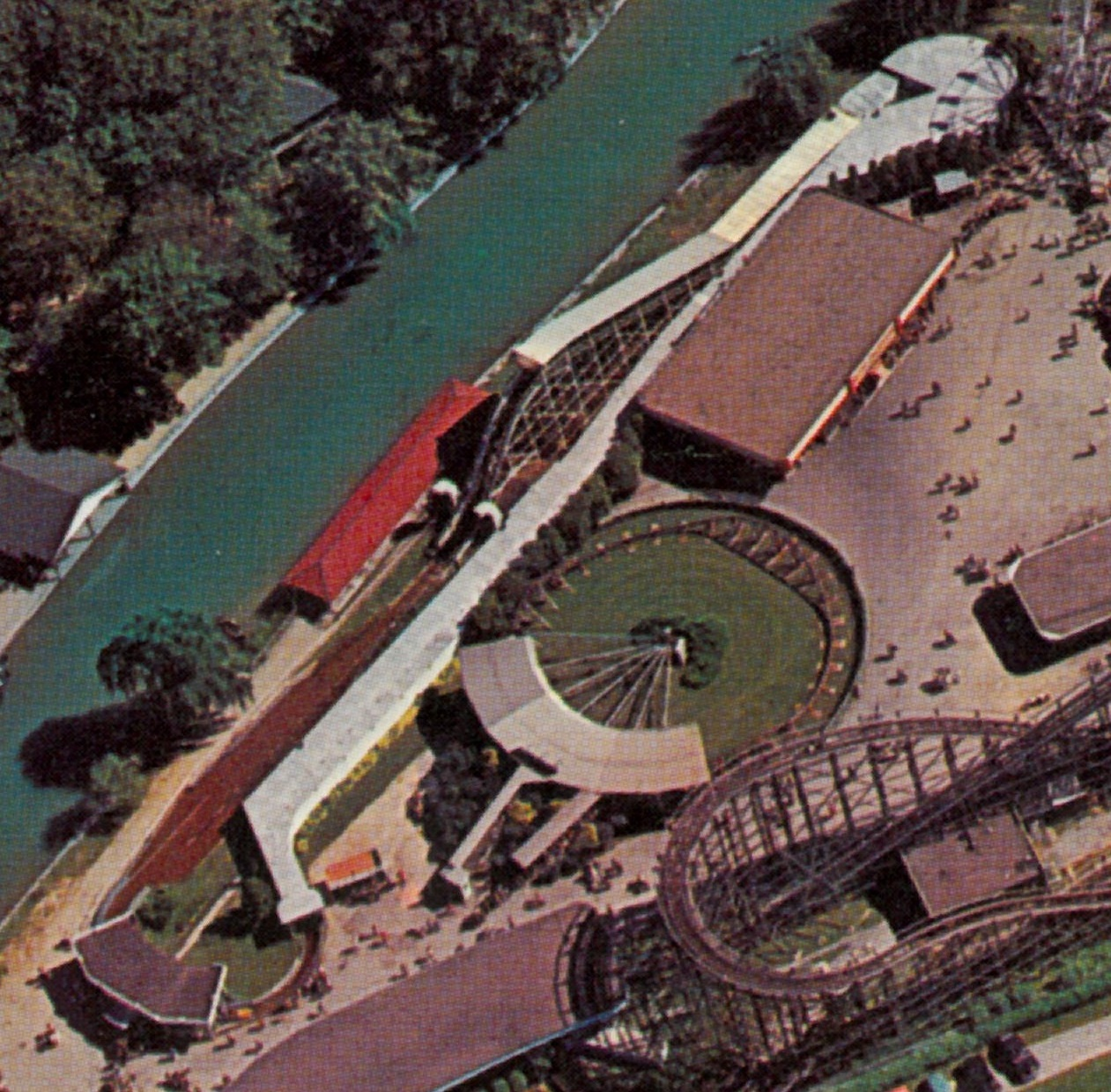
The Mill Chute is the structure with the gray roof pictured in Comet Hollow, approximately 1960

The Mill Chute was a ride at Hersheypark from 1929 until 1972. Milton S. Hershey purchased the ride from the Philadelphia Toboggan Company when the decision was made to build a new pool and drain the existing pool and neighboring lake in Comet Hollow. In 1963, the ride was renovated and rethemed. It was renamed Lost River and maintained that theme until 1972. During the 1972 season Hurricane Agnes struck Hershey, and the resulting flood of the park caused irreparable damage to the ride. As a result, the ride was closed for the remainder of the 1972 season and was torn down in the off season.

== History ==
=== Mill Chute: 1929–1962 ===
Milton S. Hershey, owner of what was then called Hershey Amusement Park, made the decision build a new pool for the park in 1929. The original pool, in the park since 1908, was drained and filled in with dirt and gravel. The result left an open space in the park, and the first ride purchased to fill that void was the Mill Chute.

=== Lost River: 1963–1972 ===
The Mill Chute was renovated and rethemed for the 1963 season as the ride had been falling into disrepair. The Lost River operated through the beginning of the 1972 season. Due to a large amount of rain from Hurricane Agnes, Hersheypark experienced an unprecedented flood which resulted in the destruction of the Lost River. Due to the damage the ride sustained from the flood waters, the ride was inoperable and unrepairable.

The Lost River was replaced by the Coal Cracker, built on the hill above Spring Creek, for the 1973 season. The Lost River's space was never truly replaced until the Great Bear steel coaster was built in 1998; its second and largest drop, vertical loop and Immelman element are located in the same location as the Mill Chute.

== See also ==
- List of former Hersheypark attractions
