= Mini-Comet =

Former roller coaster at Hersheypark

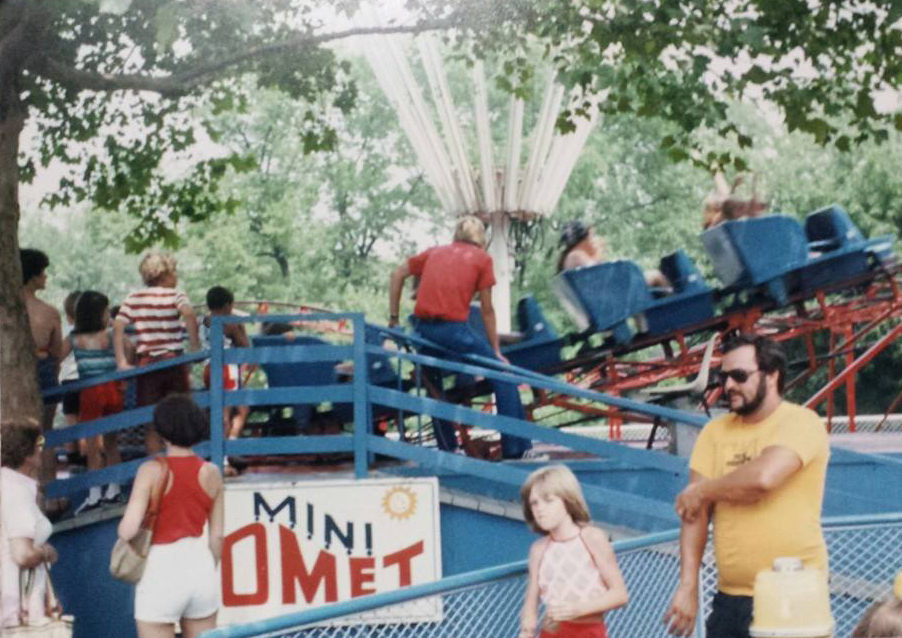
- Mini-Comet circa 1976-78.

Hersheypark
- Location: Hersheypark
- Coordinates: 40.288°N 76.657°W
- Status: Removed
- Opening date: May 10, 1974
- Closing date: October 1, 1978
- Replaced: Carrousel (relocated within park, 1972)

General statistics
- Type: Steel – Kiddie
- Manufacturer: B.A. Schiff & Associates
- Designer: Ben Schiff
- Model: Trailer
- Track layout: Oval
- Lift/launch system: Chain lift hill
- Height: 4.57 m (15.0 ft)
- Drop: 2.44 m (8.0 ft)
- Inversions: 0
- Trains: Single train with 5 cars. Riders are arranged 2 across in a single row for a total of 10 riders per train.
- Original area: The Hollow, 1974-1975
- Relocated: Kissing Tower Hill, 1976-1978
- Mini-Comet at RCDB

Mini-Comet was a kiddie roller coaster located at Hersheypark in Hershey, Pennsylvania. It was situated near Comet in The Hollow section of Hersheypark from 1974 through 1975. It was relocated to Kissing Tower Hill in 1976, where it remained in operation until its removal at the end of the 1978 season. The ride was purchased used at a public sale; it was constructed by B.A. Schiff & Associates, some time before 1974. The coaster featured an oval track with a series of small hills. It completed the circuit five times before the ride cycle ended.

== Ride history ==
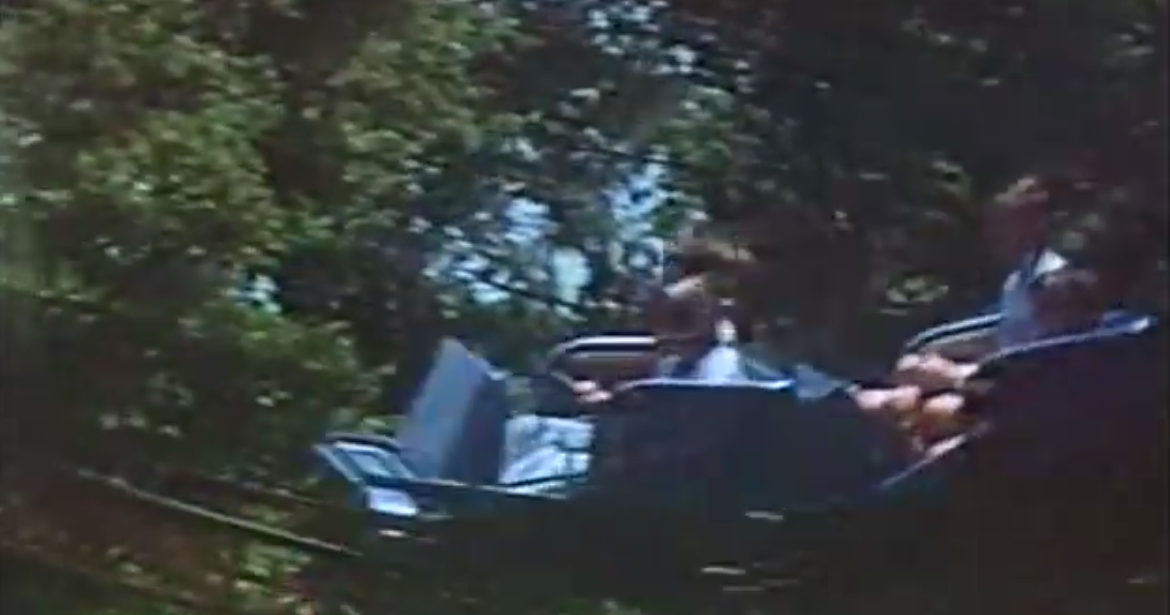
Picture of the front of the train of Mini-Comet. The front of the train is the only way to distinguish the manufacturer of the train. This style train was manufactured by B.A. Schiff & Associates.

The Mini-Comet was an oval shaped kiddie coaster. The trains were painted blue, while the track was painted red. It operated in two locations in Hersheypark; near the Comet in The Hollow and in Kissing Tower Hill next to the OutBoard MotorBoats, Whip and then Himalaya. It operated in The Hollow in 1974 and 1975, then in Kissing Tower Hill from 1976 until its removal after the 1978 season.

=== Confusion surrounding ride ===
Charles J. Jacques wrote in his book Sweetness of Success that it was an Allen Herschel built ride. It was also believed to be a Miler Manufacturer based on images of the coaster from 1978. However, based on film of the ride from 1977, it was shown to be a B.A. Schiff & Associates kiddie ride.

The name of the ride was also thought to be Little Comet, but all park documentation mentioning the ride say Mini-Comet.

== Ride experience ==
The ride begins with riders being pulled up the 15 foot chain lift hill. At the top of the hill, the track curves and goes down an eight foot drop. It curves around the oval track, going through a series of short hills. It curves around again as it approaches the station. The ride cycled four additional times before coming to a stop.

== See also ==
- List of former Hersheypark attractions
