= Streco Turnpike Cruiser =

Defunct American motor vehicle manufacturer

The Streco Turnpike Cruiser was a two-passenger open microcar built especially for amusement park and carnival use by the Streifthau Manufacturing Company of Middletown, Ohio (1958-1985), a family-owned firm managed by Edgar and Lindy Streifthau.

Records show that approximately one hundred and sixty-seven Streco Turnpike Cruisers were built, and fourteen amusement parks are known to have ordered the cars, which were powered by single-cylinder Kohler Company K-Series engines through matched centrifugal clutches at governed speeds of approximately six to eight miles per hour in single file along pre-fixed guideways and/or on winding pathways and, in some parks, with a fixed center guiderail to limit lateral motion. Streco Turnpike Cruiser bodies were constructed of solid fiberglass, and featured prominent tailfins (in conjunction with the fashion of the period), and also full wraparound bumpers for driver/passenger protection. The first series Streco cars were distinguished by standard twin-headlamp configurations, with the more rugged second series cars distinguishable by their quad headlamps.
