= Wildcat's Revenge =

Roller coaster at Hersheypark

- Previously known as Wildcat (1996–2022)

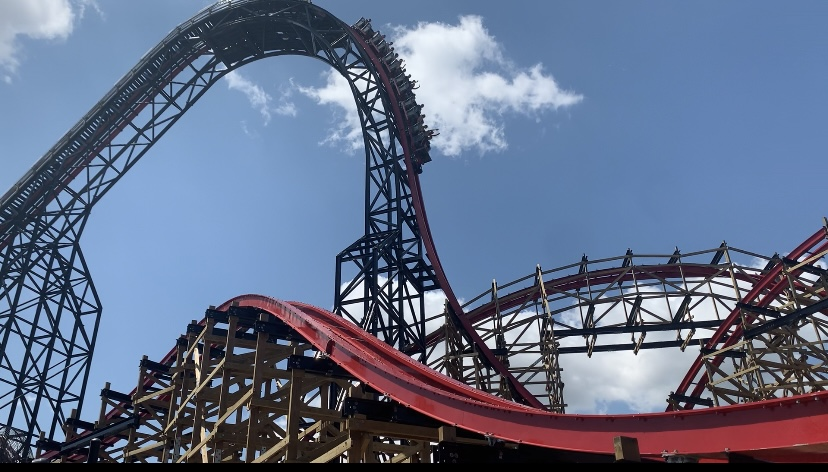
- Wildcat's Revenge's first drop

Hersheypark
- Location: Hersheypark
- Park section: Midway America
- Coordinates: 40°17′33″N 76°39′21″W
- Status: Operating
- Opening date: June 2, 2023
- Replaced: Wildcat

General statistics
- Type: Steel
- Manufacturer: Rocky Mountain Construction
- Designer: Joe Draves
- Model: I-Box Track
- Track layout: Twister
- Lift/launch system: Chain lift hill
- Height: 140 ft (43 m)
- Drop: 135 ft (41 m)
- Length: 3,510 ft (1,070 m)
- Speed: 62 mph (100 km/h)
- Inversions: 4
- Duration: 2:36
- Max vertical angle: 82°
- Height restriction: 48 in (122 cm)
- Trains: 3 trains with 6 cars; riders arranged 2 across in 2 rows for a total of 24 riders per train
- Website: Official website
- Wildcat's Revenge at RCDB

Wildcat's Revenge is a hybrid roller coaster located at Hersheypark in Hershey, Pennsylvania, United States. The ride originally opened in 1996 as Wildcat, a wooden coaster manufactured by Great Coasters International (GCI). The wooden coaster was the first from GCI and served as the anchor attraction of the Midway America section of the park. It cost $5.6 million to construct and was built on a 2-acre (0.81 ha) plot of land that had previously been used for parking. The ride traversed a 90-foot lift hill and twelve banked turns, subjecting riders to forces of up to 3.5 Gs. From 1998 to 2009, Wildcat ranked among the top 50 wooden roller coasters in the annual Golden Ticket Awards publication from Amusement Today. Wildcat initially received critical acclaim, but it gained a negative reputation for its increasing roughness.

Wildcat closed for a major refurbishment in July 2022. Rocky Mountain Construction (RMC) was hired to convert the ride into a hybrid coaster, a wooden support structure with a steel track featuring RMC's I-Box track technology. It reopened as Wildcat's Revenge on June 2, 2023. The renovated coaster added four inversions and additional track length to the previous layout, as well as increased the height, drop, and maximum speed.

== History ==
=== Original development ===
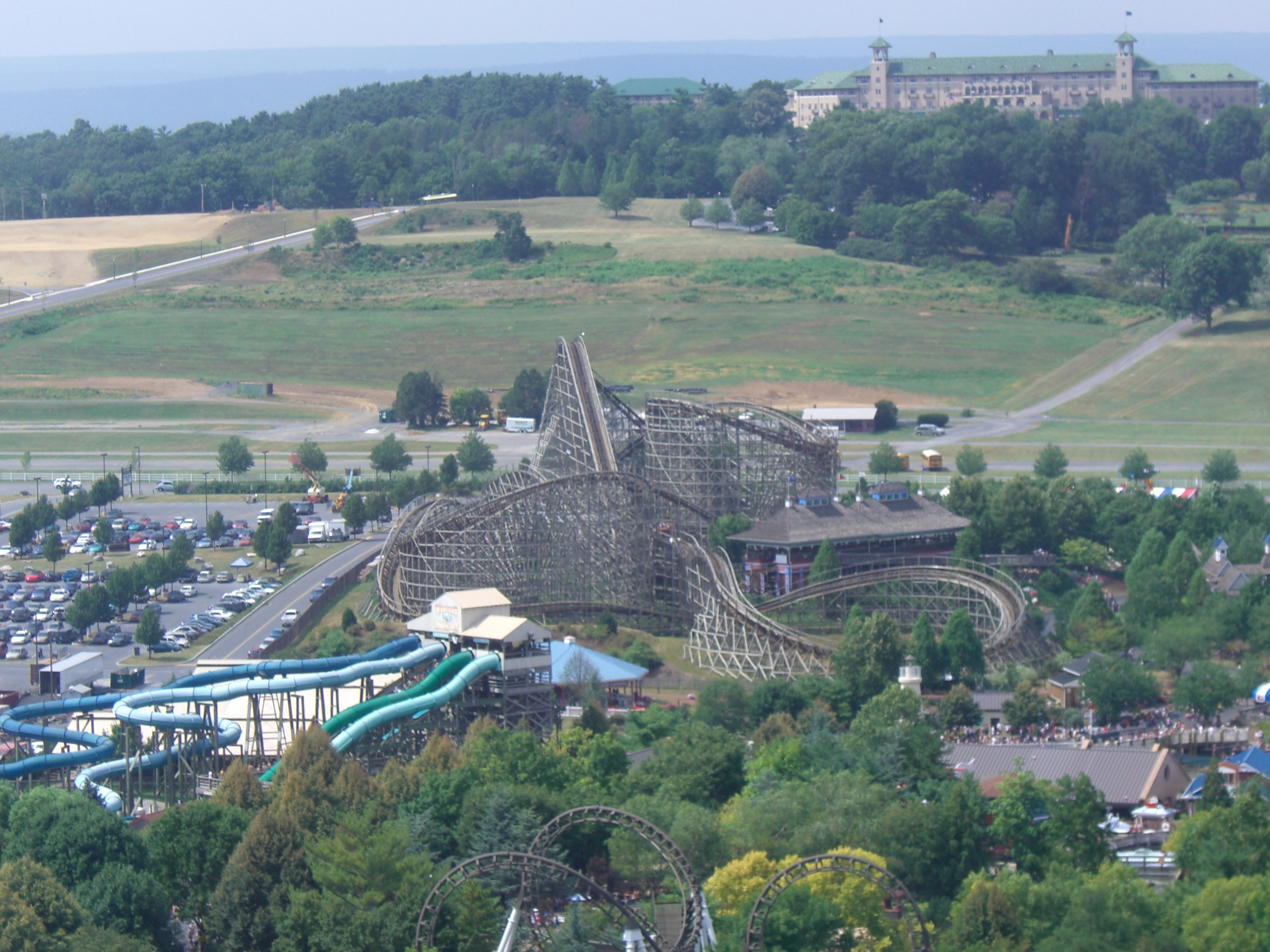
Wildcat from the Kissing Tower

In June 1995, the Hershey Entertainment and Resorts Company announced that it would build "The Wildcat", a wooden roller coaster at Hersheypark in Hershey, Pennsylvania, over the following year. The ride would be named after The Wild Cat, Hersheypark's first roller coaster, which operated from 1923 to 1945. The coaster was intended as the main attraction in Midway America, an area in Hersheypark themed to classic American attractions; construction of the themed area had begun the prior month. Wildcat was the first coaster constructed by Pennsylvania firm Great Coasters International (GCI). The 2-acre (0.81 ha) plot on which the ride was built had previously been used for parking.

The roller coaster was designed by Mike Boodley and Clair Hain Jr.; both men had cofounded GCI. The company started constructing Wildcat in August 1995. The roller coaster's trains were manufactured by Philadelphia Toboggan Coasters (PTC) between September 1995 and February 1996. Work on the ride was complicated by the North American blizzard of 1996, during which workers reportedly "had to dig out wood from snow". It was originally expected to open on May 11, 1996, along with an "inauguration celebration". Wildcat was planned to be part of "Physics Day" on May 17, where it would be used to demonstrate gravitational pulls. Wildcat cost $5.6 million to construct. The ride was constructed with 514,000 board feet (1,210 m^{3}) of Southern yellow pine.

Wildcat ultimately opened to the media on May 23, 1996, and to the public on May 26, 1996. The ride's opening was accompanied by a one-hour-long television special called Wild Rides, which aired on the Discovery Channel on May 26, 1996. The original PTC trains were replaced in 2007 with 12-car Millennium Flyer trains manufactured by GCI.

=== Conversion ===
Hersheypark announced in July 2022 that Wildcat was scheduled to close permanently on July 31, 2022. Family members of Nicholas Pantalone, who had been one of the ride's operators before his death in 2013, were present on Wildcat's final ride. Following the announcement, the park posted on Twitter, "Any suggestions on what we could do with 3,100 feet of wooden track?" Rocky Mountain Construction (RMC) replied on Twitter stating, "We have a few ideas...". This led to speculation that RMC would rebuild the retired ride. RMC had previously rebuilt several wooden coasters, such as Twisted Colossus at Six Flags Magic Mountain, Twisted Timbers at Kings Dominion, and Wicked Cyclone at Six Flags New England; according to The York Dispatch, these rebuilds "might be a model for the closing Wildcat". At the time, a spokesperson for Hersheypark refused to confirm rumors of Wildcat's future, saying: "We will share details on what's next before the end of" 2022. Workers began dismantling the existing ride immediately after it closed.

On November 2, 2022, Hersheypark confirmed that RMC was converting Wildcat into a hybrid roller coaster called Wildcat's Revenge. The ride would utilize the existing wooden infrastructure accompanied by steel track, with an expected opening in 2023. Hersheypark began selling 160 pieces of wood, salvaged from the original GCI coaster, at a gift shop just outside the park that November. During the design process, Hersheypark dictated the parameters for the ride to RMC, such as height, length, and number of inversions. RMC and Hersheypark workers collaborated to determine which elements should be included in the ride, eventually deciding upon four inversions: an underflip, zero-g stall, and two rolls.

Installation of trackwork began on November 9. The next week, Hersheypark publicly displayed the front car of one of Wildcat's Revenge's new trains at the International Association of Amusement Parks and Attractions Expo in Orlando, Florida. Parts of the existing support structure were removed to make way for the installation of RMC's I-Box track, though the supports at the border of the park, along Hersheypark Drive, were retained. Installation of the first inversion—the underflip, which used some of the old lift hill's structure—began in mid-December 2022 and was completed the next month. Hersheypark released a video of a simulated ride on Wildcat's Revenge in February 2023. The top of the lift hill was installed on April 17, 2023, and the final inversions were being installed by the end of the month. Test runs of WIldcat's Revenge commenced in mid-May 2023, and Hersheypark announced the ride's final opening date shortly afterward. The ride opened on June 2, 2023, following a soft opening for members of the media the previous day. Wildcat's Revenge was the first roller coaster in Pennsylvania to be converted into an RMC hybrid coaster.

== Characteristics ==
=== Wooden roller coaster ===
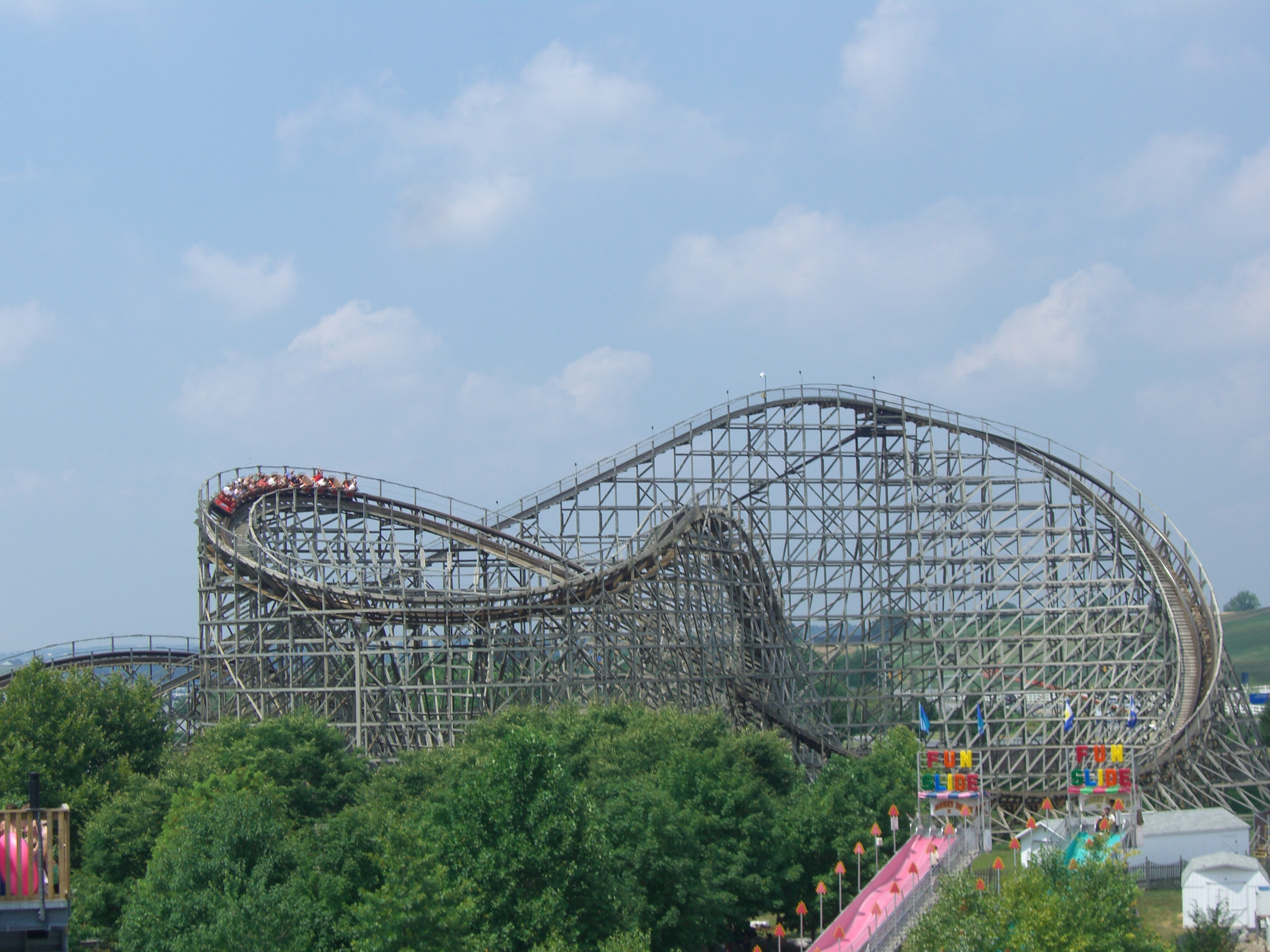
Wildcat's lift, drop, and large twister segment

The station was shaped like a "Victorian station house" with a red, white, and blue paint scheme. Riders left the station and traversed a small right-hand drop. The train ascended the 90-foot (27 m) lift hill, then descended the first drop at a 45-degree angle, dropping about 85 feet (26 m) and curving about 180 degrees to the right. Riders then went on several similar drops before returning to the station. After the first drop, the ride ascended a left-hand curve, traveled through an airtime hill above the bottom of the first drop, and descended to the left beneath the lift hill. The train then traveled straight over another airtime hill before curving 270 degrees to the right. Passing over the bottom of the lift hill, the train curved left again, ascended another airtime hill, then descended another left-hand curve. The train next curved right and traversed another series of lift hills before entering the final brake run and making a sharp right turn into the station.

Wildcat's maximum speed was variously cited as being between 48 miles per hour (77 km/h) and 50 miles per hour (80 km/h). There were 11 or 12 banked turns in total, subjecting riders to forces of up to 3.5 Gs. The track crossed above and below itself 20 times. Wildcat was located on a relatively large hill, giving it the appearance of being taller than it actually was. Because of the terrain, the top of the lift hill was 105 feet (32 m) above ground, even though it was only 90 feet above the bottom of the lift hill. At night, the track was illuminated by strings of lights. The roller coaster was constructed of prefabricated wooden pieces, allowing park officials to replace worn-out pieces easily. Wildcat also contained an on-ride camera; guests could purchase photos at a booth near the roller coaster's exit.

The ride originally ran with two trains manufactured by PTC. Both the PTC trains, and the GCI Millennium Flyer trains that replaced them in 2007, could fit 24 passengers each. The PTC trains had six cars, each of which had two rows of two seats, while the Millennium Flyer trains had twelve cars, each of which had one row of two seats. Each of the trains contained lap bar restraints. The ride had a maximum throughput of 1,000 guests per hour.

=== Steel roller coaster ===
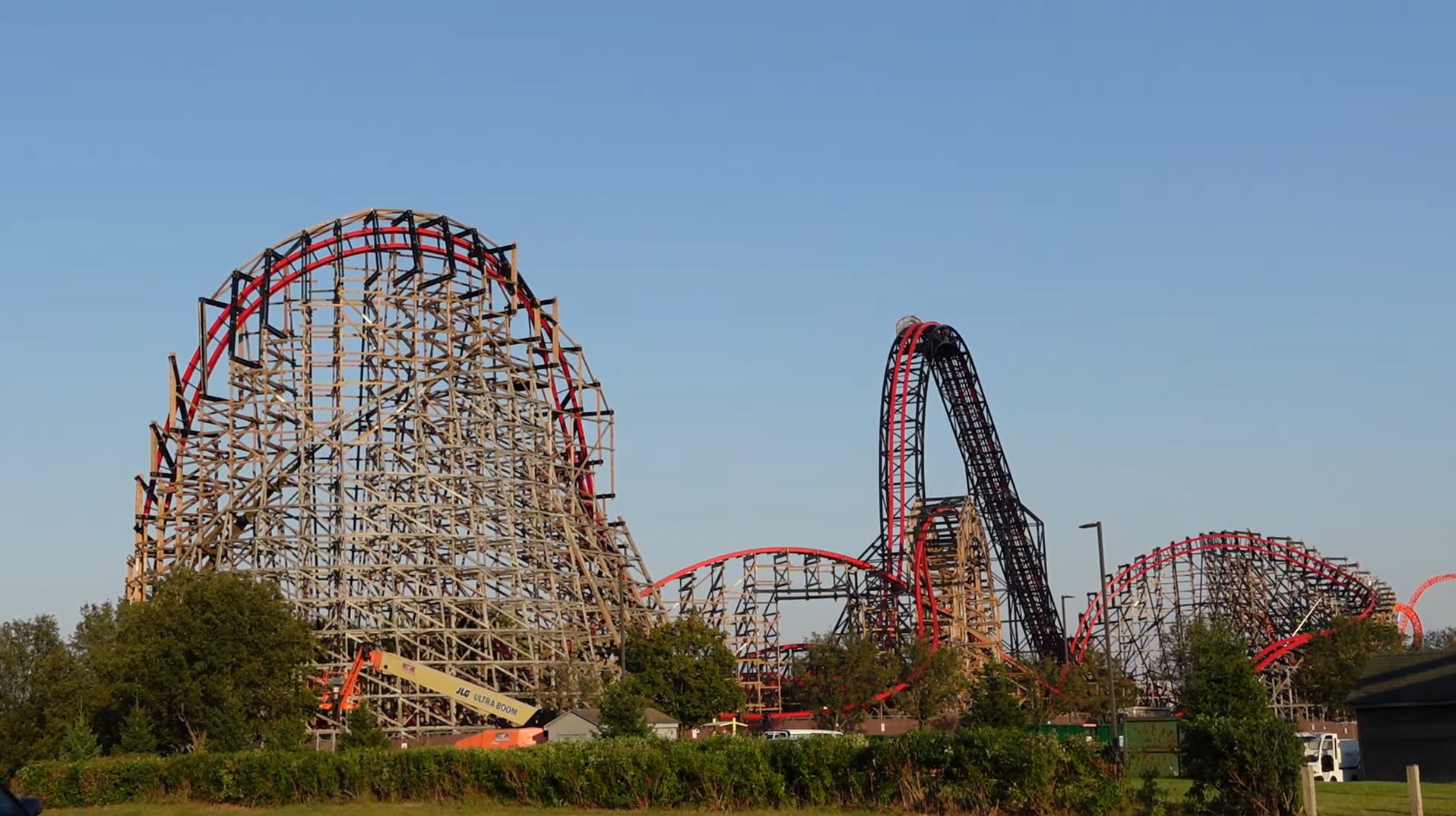
Wildcat's Revenge

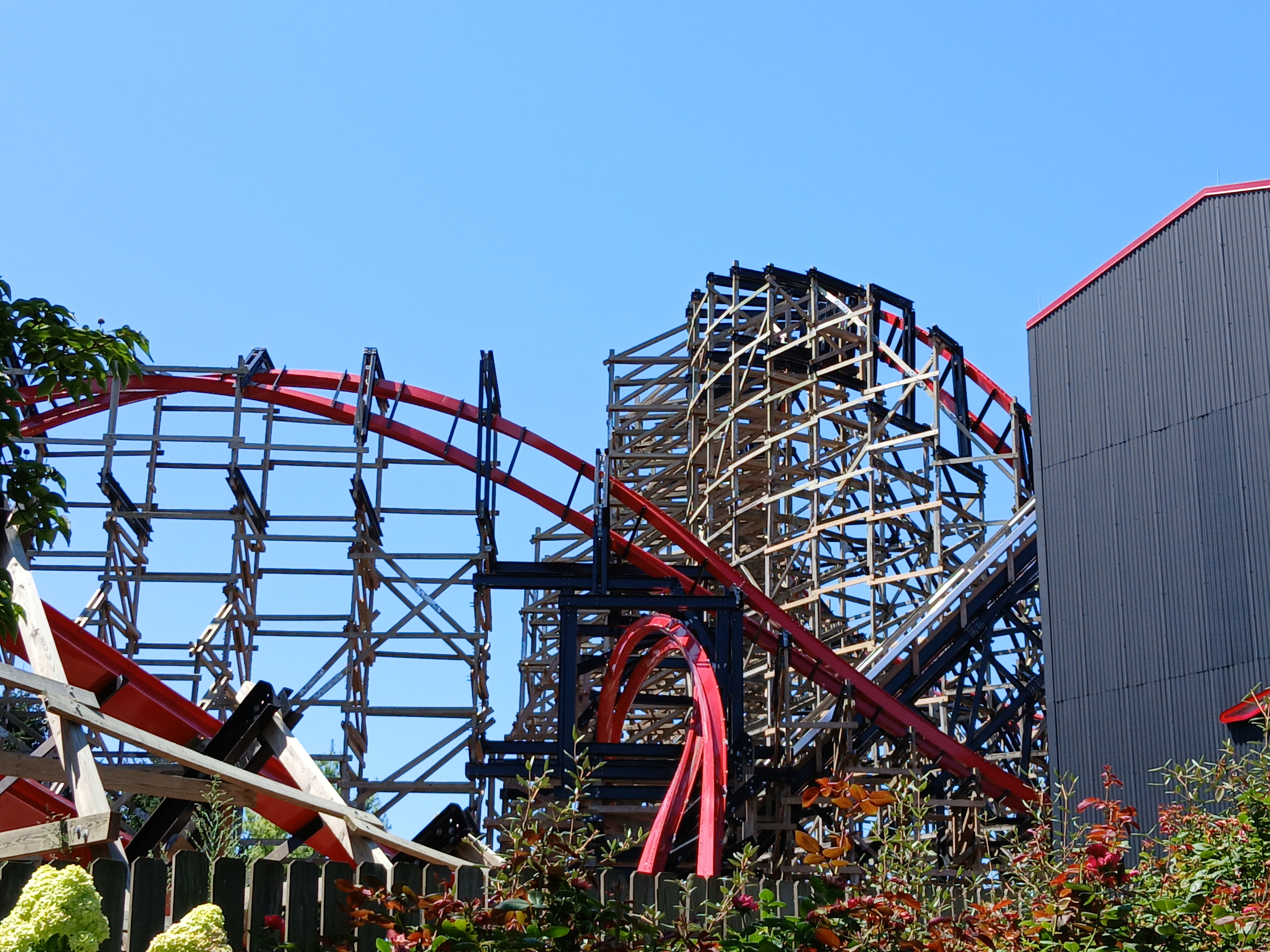
Wildcat's Revenge's third and fourth inversions

From 2022 to 2023, the former Wildcat was converted into a steel roller coaster manufactured by RMC and designed by Joe Draves. The ride contains four inversions and reuses most of the original wooden roller coaster's support structure. This roller coaster is 3,510 feet (1,070 m) long, with a lift hill rising 140 feet (43 m) and a first drop of 135 feet (41 m). The expansion of the lift hill required the construction of a new truss. The ride has an 82-degree drop off the lift hill, reaching a maximum speed of 62 miles per hour (100 km/h). The ride features the world's largest underflip inversion, which Hersheypark officials described as ascending upwards before the train twists counterclockwise into a 270° roll before descending down. One cycle of the ride lasts 2 minutes and 36 seconds. The roller coaster contains red track, as well as black supports made of wood and steel. The ride's station has a gable roof, which was intended to be reminiscent of the Wild Cat roller coaster that closed in 1945.

Wildcat's Revenge is equipped with three custom trains. Each train has six cars that contain two rows of two seats, allowing up to 24 people per train. The trains are themed to wildcats and are painted black, charcoal, and silver. Despite the lack of a mid-course brake run, all three trains can theoretically operate at the same time, as the station can fit two trains.

=== Comparison ===
Statistic	Wildcat	Wildcat's Revenge
Years	1996–2022	2023–present
Manufacturer	Great Coasters International	Rocky Mountain Construction
Designer	Clair Hain; Mike Boodley	Joe Draves
Track	Wood	Steel
Height	106 ft or 32 m	140 ft or 43 m
Drop	85.2 ft or 26.0 m	135 ft or 41 m
Length	3,183 ft or 970 m	3,510 ft or 1,070 m
Speed	50 mph or 80 km/h	62 mph or 100 km/h
Max vertical angle	45°	82°
Inversions	0	4
Trains	2, made by Philadelphia Toboggan Company (1996–2006) 2, made by Great Coasters International (2007–2022)	3, made by Rocky Mountain Construction

== Reception ==
When the original Wildcat opened, Erik Arneson of the Lebanon Daily News wrote: "I'm a fan of multiple loops ... but the Wildcat is the fastest roller coaster I've ever been on, and it's exciting from start to finish." Lisa Wiseman of the York Daily Record said at the ride's opening: "The Wildcat is indeed a wild ride, but surprisingly, a smooth ride." According to Randy Kraft of the Associated Press, "After the top of the first hill, it seems to have almost no sections of straight track. There's no chance to catch your breath or orient yourself." Elizabeth Arneson of the Lebanon, Pennsylvania, Daily News wrote in 1998: "The top speed is listed at 45 mph at Hersheypark's Web site, but the ride feels much faster. [...] there is little time for sightseeing as the coaster hits banked turn after banked turn." By the time Wildcat closed in 2022, it had become noticeably rough.

When Wildcat's Revenge opened, a reporter for the Harrisburg-area Patriot-News wrote: "For people who don’t mind a lot of twists, turns, dips and spins, it’s definitely something they’ll want to check out." A writer for LNP Lancaster Online wrote: "An immediate joy about Wildcat’s Revenge is that, from the moment the ride takes off, it almost instantly jolts off instead of giving you a few seconds to ponder the next minute and a half of your life. ... Other than the initial tick-tick-tick up the initial 140-foot climb and the hard stop at the end, Wildcat’s Revenge is unbelievably smooth." National Amusement Park Historical Association's 2024 survey ranked Wildcat's Revenge as its "favorite new attraction", tied with Big Bear Mountain at Dollywood.

=== Rankings ===
Golden Ticket Awards: Top wood Roller Coasters
Year									1998	1999
Ranking									11	12
Year	2000	2001	2002	2003	2004	2005	2006	2007	2008	2009
Ranking	17	22	25	28	28	32	43	38	45	45
Year	2010	2011	2012	2013	2014	2015	2016	2017	2018	2019
Ranking	–	–	–	–	–	–	–	–	–	–
Year	2020	2021	2022	2023	2024	2025	2026			
Ranking	N/A	–	–	–	–	–	–			

Golden Ticket Awards: Top steel Roller Coasters
Year									1998	1999
Ranking									–	–
Year	2000	2001	2002	2003	2004	2005	2006	2007	2008	2009
Ranking	–	–	–	–	–	–	–	–	–	–
Year	2010	2011	2012	2013	2014	2015	2016	2017	2018	2019
Ranking	–	–	–	–	–	–	–	–	–	–
Year	2020	2021	2022	2023	2024	2025	2026			
Ranking	N/A	–	–	40	29	27	25			
