= Giant Wheel (Hersheypark) =

Former ride at Hersheypark

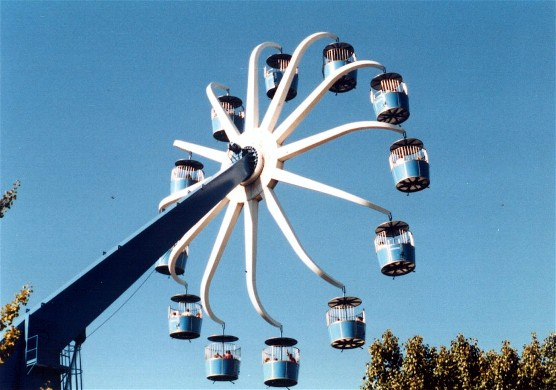

Hersheypark
- Status: Removed
- Opening date: 1973
- Closing date: 2004

Ride statistics
- Attraction type: Double Ferris wheel
- Manufacturer: Waagner-Biro
- Designer: Intamin
- Model: Double Swiveling Wheel
- Height: 32 m (105 ft)
- Site area: 2,290 m^{2} (24,600 sq ft)
- Vehicle type: Enclosed cage
- Vehicles: 24 total (12 per wheel)
- Riders per vehicle: 6

Giant Wheel was an Intamin-supplied double wheel that operated at Hersheypark between 1973 and 2004. The entire structure weighed over 135 tons, and was installed in a 25-feet square slab of concrete, 10 feet thick.

The ride comprised a 116-foot cross beam, each end carrying a 12-arm wheel, with a circular eight-passenger cabin suspended from each of the wheel arms. One end of the cross beam would rise approximately one hundred feet as its wheel spun in a clockwise motion. The cabins could also be spun in the horizontal plane using a central steering wheel, similar to a teacup ride. After being up in the air for several minutes, and after the second wheel was loaded, the first wheel was lowered to the ground and the second wheel raised in the air. When shut down, the cross beam would rest at equipoise, both wheels dangling 40-to-50 feet off the ground.

The ride could handle large crowds, and had a capacity of 2,000 persons per hour.

The Giant Wheel closed in October of 2004 and the ride was removed over the late fall with some of the gondolas being saved and the rest of the ride being scrapped. Some collectors have received and even restored some of the gondolas to original condition to as they were in the park. When The Chocolatier opened in 2021 the park refurbished and installed one of the gondolas onto the outside patio where it can be visited today by guests.

The Hersheypark Supply Co. gift shop introduced a line of retired attraction souvenirs during the summer of 2022 featuring the Giant Wheel.
