= List of Hersheypark attractions =

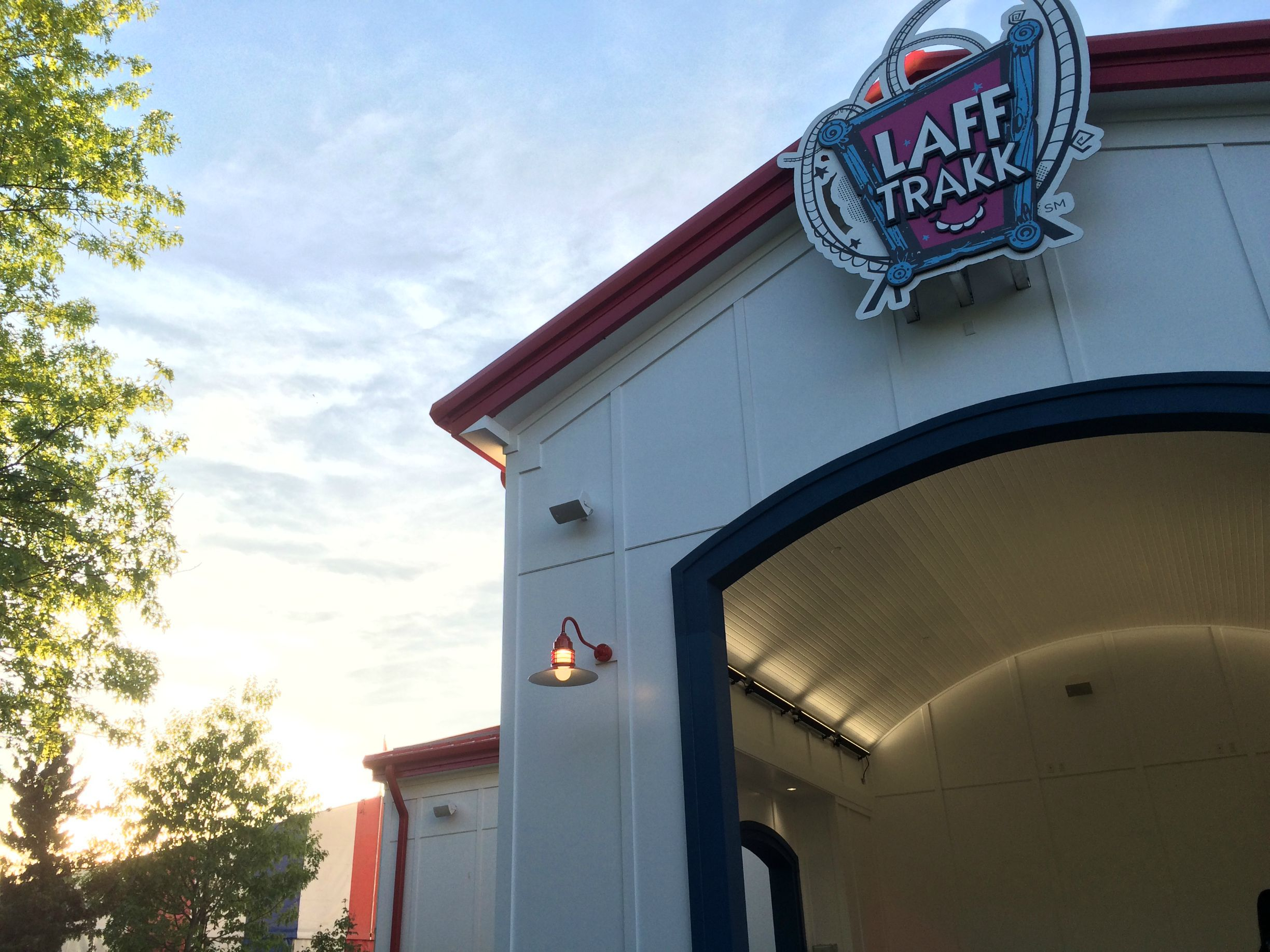
Laff Trakk is Hersheypark's 13th roller coaster

This is a list of Hersheypark attractions, giving an overview of the rides and attractions at the theme park located in Hershey, Pennsylvania. Hersheypark currently has 76 rides and water attractions.

== Present attractions ==
Thrill rating (out of 5)
1 (Children's ride) 2 (mild) 3 (moderate) 4 (high) 5 (aggressive)

=== Roller coasters ===
Hersheypark has 14 roller coasters, the most of any amusement park in Pennsylvania.

Coaster	Picture	Manufacturer	Height restriction	Type/model	Season opened	Location	Thrill Rating	Ref(s)
Comet		Philadelphia Toboggan Company	42 inches	Wooden	1946	The Hollow	4	
Trailblazer		Arrow Development	36 inches	Mine train	1974	Pioneer Frontier	3	
sooperdooperLooper		Schwarzkopf	42 inches	Steel	1977	The Hollow	4	
Jolly Rancher Remix		Vekoma	48 inches	Boomerang coaster	1991	Pioneer Frontier	5	
Great Bear		Bolliger & Mabillard	54 inches	Inverted	1998	Kissing Tower Hill	5	
Wild Mouse		Mack Rides	48 inches	Wild Mouse coaster	1999	Midway America	3	
Lightning Racer		Great Coasters International	48 inches	Dual-tracked	2000	Midway America	4	
Storm Runner		Intamin	54 inches	Launch	2004	Pioneer Frontier	5	
Fahrenheit		Intamin	54 inches	Vertical lift	2008	Pioneer Frontier	5	
Skyrush		Intamin	54 inches	Steel Hypercoaster	2012	The Hollow	5	
Cocoa Cruiser		Zamperla	36 inches	Family gravity	2014	Founder's Way	3	
Laff Trakk		Maurer AG	42 inches	Spinning indoor	2015	Midway America	3	
Candymonium		Bolliger & Mabillard	54 inches	Steel Hypercoaster	2020	Hershey's Chocolatetown	5	
Wildcat's Revenge		Rocky Mountain Construction	48 inches	Hybrid coaster	2023	Midway America	5	

=== Water rides ===
Hersheypark has 16 water rides, 6 of which are part of the slide complex Coastline Plunge. All of the water rides are located in The Boardwalk, except Coal Cracker, which is located in Kissing Tower Hill, near Great Bear.

Ride	Opened	Manufacturer	Description	Thrill Rating	Ref(s)
Coal Cracker	1973	Arrow Development	This is park's second log flume ride, as well as the world's first hydroflume ride, it replaced the park's first water ride, the Mill Chute, after it was destroyed in the Hurricane Agnes flood in 1972.	4	
Tidal Force (now retired)	1994	Hopkins Rides	A splash-down ride with a 100-foot (30 m) drop. Its spray is powerful enough to reach visitors passing by on the walkways.	4	
Bayside Pier	2007	Hershey Entertainment & Resorts	A Kiddie wave pool.	1	
East Coast Waterworks	2007	WhiteWater West	A water playground.	3	
Sandcastle Cove	2007	Creative Environs	A kiddie water playground.	2	
Intercoastal Waterway	2009	Water Technology, Inc.	A Lazy River type water ride.	2	
The Shore	2009	Water Technology, Inc.	A large family wave pool, part of the 2009 expansion of the Boardwalk.	4	
Shoreline Sprayground	2013	Emerald FX	A family splash area with seating and shade.	1	
Breakers Edge Water Coaster	2018	ProSlide Technology	A water coaster which includes FlyingSaucer turns and high speed tunnels. This effectively replaced Roller Soaker which was removed after the 2012 season.	3	
Whitecap Racer	2018	ProSlide Technology	An Octopus racer model and is the longest mat racing slide in the world. Riders can register to wear a race band to see who wins each race.	3	

Coastline Plunge

Coastline Plunge is a slide complex located in The Boardwalk. The complex features six slides with a variety of different experiences. All six slides were manufactured by ProSlide Technology. Four slides were part of the original Boardwalk expansion in 2007. Two slides, Hydro and Pipeline, were added in 2013.

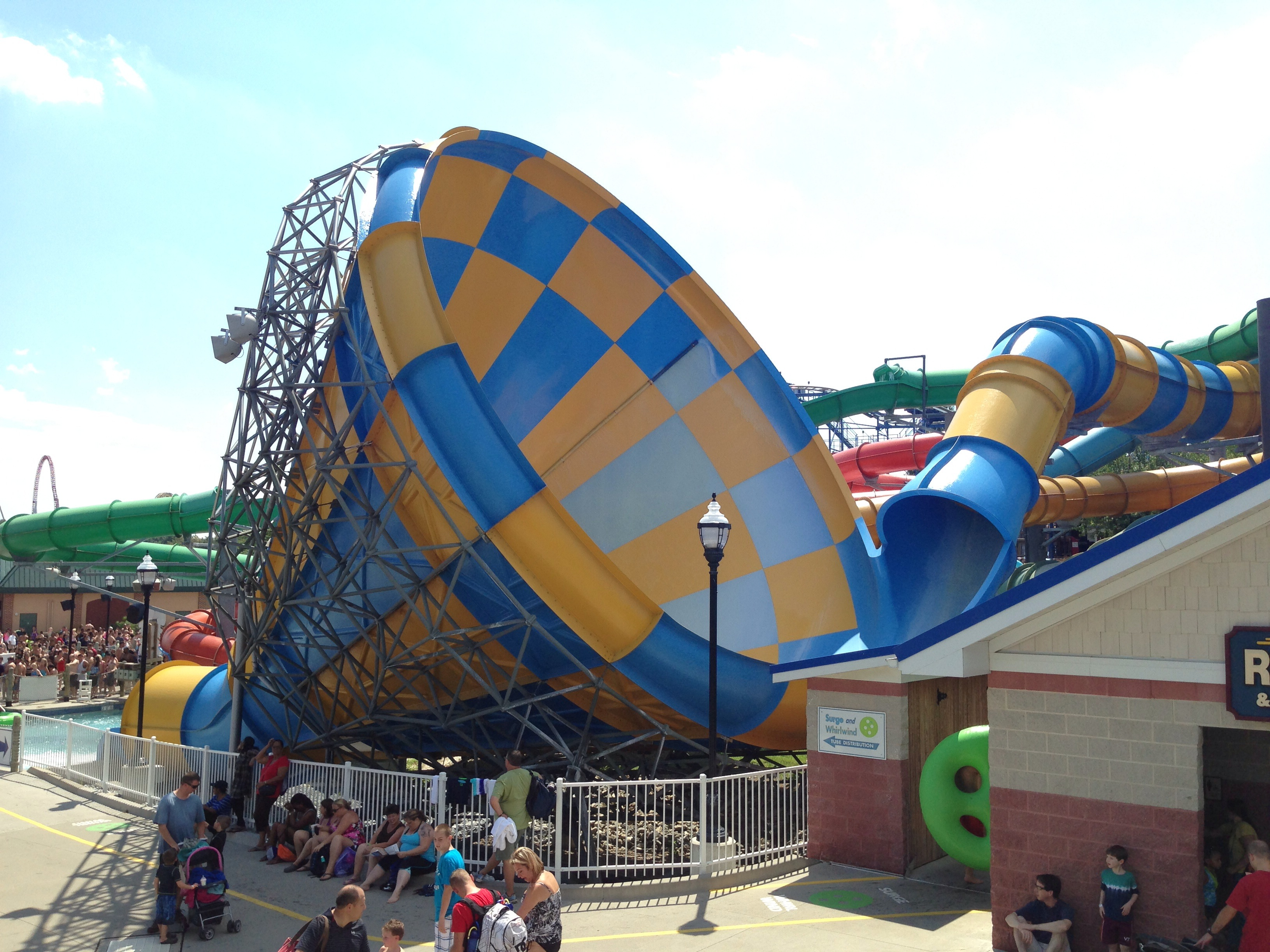
Whirlwind a ProSlide Tornado is one slide part of the Coastline Plunge slide complex in The Boardwalk

Ride	Description	Thrill Rating
Hydro	This slide has serpentine turns and sections which are closed and opened.	4
Pipeline	Inline tubing slide, 2 person maximum.	4
Riptide	Inline tubing slide, 2 person maximum.	4
Surge	Inline tubing slide, 2 persons needed.	4
Vortex	Has a large bowl often referenced as a "toilet bowl" feature.	4
Whirlwind	Has a whirlwind flume feature that creates vertical-like banking.	5

=== Flat rides ===
Hersheypark has 25 flat rides.

Ride	Year Opened	Manufacturer	Location	Description	Thrill Rating	Ref(s)
Carrousel	1945	Philadelphia Toboggan Company	Hershey's Chocolatetown	The carousel features music from a 1926 Wurlitzer style #153 Military Band Organ. Today, the carousel is the oldest ride in the park. It was originally built in 1919 and is called PTC #47.	2	
Dry Gulch Railroad	1961	Crown Metal Products	Pioneer Frontier	This is a 2 foot gauge train that travels past southwest-themed props such as cacti, ghost towns, abandoned mines, and "Indians" in teepees.	2	
Starship America	1962	Kasper Klaus	Founder's Way	A classic ride temporarily closed between 2003 and 2004, now located in Founder's Way.	3	
Monorail	1969	Universal Mobility	Founder's Way	Takes riders on a relaxing, elevated tour of the park, briefly crossing over ZOOAMERICA and downtown Hershey, Pennsylvania. Before 1973 the monorail served as an entrance/exit to the park from the Hershey chocolate factory tour.	2	
Scrambler	1972	Eli Bridge Company	Founder's Way	Guests sit in a car with a maximum of three people per car. The ride has three arms with four cars each. The entire ride spins, causing the four cars to spin on each arm.	3	
Kissing Tower	1975	Waagner Biro AG	Kissing Tower Hill	Takes riders on a trip upwards 250 feet (76 m) while rotating clockwise, providing a panoramic view of Hershey through windows shaped like a Hershey's Kiss. It was sold to Hersheypark by Intamin AG.	2	
Twin Turnpike - Antique Cars	1975	Arrow Development	Kissing Tower Hill	Guests drive scaled-down, gasoline-powered cars around a short track which is parallel to the Sunoco Speedway sports cars. 4 riders maximum per vehicle, which are dressed as Model T-style antique vehicles. Original Arrow cars were replaced in 2018 with new models by Gould Manufacturing.	2	
Twin Turnpike - Sunoco Speedway	1975	Arrow Development	Kissing Tower Hill	Guests drive scaled-down, gasoline-powered sports cars around a short track which is parallel to the Antique Cars. 2 riders maximum per vehicle which are dressed as Corvette-style racers.	2	
Pirate	1980	HUSS Maschinenfabrik	Pioneer Frontier	Reese's can ride, but must be with a responsible rider and also sit in one of the center rows where there are orange circles on the seats.	3	
Wave Swinger	1982	Zierer	The Hollow	A chair swing ride located in The Hollow. This replaced The Bug when it was installed.	3	
Tilt-A-Whirl	1983	Sellner Manufacturing	Founder's Way	Was in Carrousel Circle from 1983 to 1995, then in Comet Hollow from 1996 to 2011. When Skyrush was added, it was moved back to its original location.	3	
Fender Bender	1997	Reverchon	Founder's Way	The only bumper car ride in Hersheypark, the current building was built in 1978, featuring Lusse bumper cars. Around 40 bumper cars ride for about 2 minutes, reaching a top speed of approximately 15 miles per hour. The Reverchon bumper cars were installed in 1997.	4	
Ferris Wheel	1997	Chance Rides	Midway America	This Ferris wheel is 88 feet (27 m) in diameter and sends riders nearly 100 feet (30 m) into the air. Installed in 1997.	2	
Merry Derry Dip Fun Slides - Trailer Model	1998	Frederiksen Industries	Midway America	A set of three fun slides, operated during the fall 1998 season. Installed in Midway America with a park model in 1999.	2	
Merry Derry Dip Fun Slides - Park Model	1999	Frederiksen Industries	Midway America	Located adjacent to Wildcat and Laff Trakk, this was installed next to the trailer model.	2	
Music Express	1999	Moser's Rides	Midway America	This is a Himalaya ride, but it does not go backwards. It plays music during the ride.	3	
Liberty Flyers	2003	Larson International	Pioneer Frontier	This was the first time a ride of this type had been in the park since the Aerial Joy Ride had been in the park in the 1950s. Was renamed to Liberty Flyers in 2026 to honor Americas 250th anniversary.	3	
The Claw	2003	Chance Rides	Pioneer Frontier	A swinging pendulum ride installed in 2003, replacing the old Cyclops (a version of the Enterprise ride).	4	
The Howler	2008	Wisdom Rides	Pioneer Frontier	Each passenger can spin their own car and the entire ride lifts 7½ feet and tilts 20 degrees, causing each car to swing in and out.	3	
Tea Cups	2014	Zamperla	The Hollow	This is a tea cup themed ride with cars that swing around on a single platform.	2	
Hershey Triple Tower - Kisses Tower	2017	S&S - Sansei Technologies	Kissing Tower Hill	83 foot tall drop tower.	5	
Hershey Triple Tower - Reese's Tower	2017	S&S - Sansei Technologies	Kissing Tower Hill	135 foot tall drop tower.	5	
Hershey Triple Tower - Hershey's Tower	2017	S&S - Sansei Technologies	Kissing Tower Hill	197 foot tall drop tower.	5	
Reese's Cupfusion	2019	Sally Corporation	Founders Way	An interactive gaming dark ride which has riders protecting an item called the Crystal Cup from The League of Misfit Candy, led by Mint the merciless. Replaced Reese's Xtreme Cup Challenge.	2	
Mix'd, Flavored By Jolly Rancher	2022	Zamperla	Pioneer Frontier	A NebluaZ attraction where sets of arms with vehicles at their ends continue to intersect with each other, creating the illusion of near-misses and collision courses with other riders.	3	
Twizzlers Twisted Gravity	2025	S&S - Sansei Technologies	The Hollow	The tallest Screamin’ Swing in the world at the time of opening.	5	

=== Kiddie rides ===
Hersheypark's 'The Claw' ride in motion

A dynamic view of Hersheypark's Ferris wheel

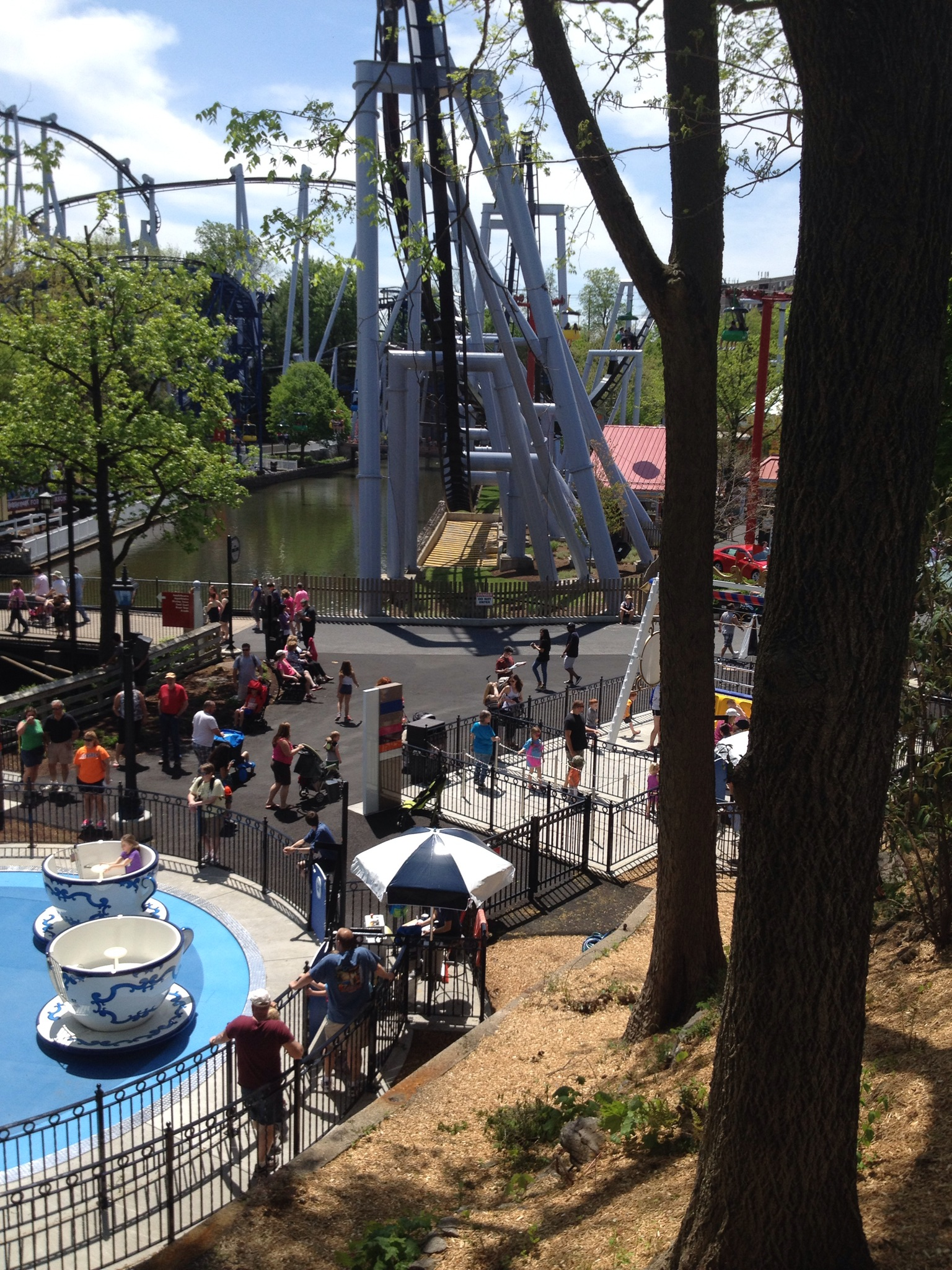
This is a region of Hersheypark called The Hollow

Hersheypark has 20 kiddie rides. All kiddie rides are rated as a 1.

Founder's Way

The kiddie rides that were built prior to 1971 were part of an area of the park known as Kiddieland, an area of the park that existed from 1949 to 1971. A number of the rides in this area of the park came from that era.

Name	Opened	Manufacturer	Height Requirement (Note: Hersheypark uses Hershey Company products as names for each height range to determine who can ride which rides. See their "Rider Safety & Accessibility Guide" (PDF). Hershey Entertainment & Resorts Company. p. 7. for more specific details. All measurements are in inches: Miniatures: 0 - 36 (3' and below); Kisses: 36 - 42 (3' - 3'6"); Reese's: 42 - 48 (3'6" - 4'); Hershey's: 48 - 54 (4' - 4'6"); Twizzler: 54 - 60 (4'6" - 5'); Jolly Rancher: 60 and above (5' and above); In the kiddie rides lists seen here, height categories are abbreviated to the first letter of the category, bolded above. A single asterisk * next to the height category means that they must ride with a responsible rider.)	Ref(s)
Minty Bees	1961	Hampton Amusements	M, K, R, H	
Dizzy Drums	1961	Hampton Amusements	K, R, H	
Helicopters	1964	Allan Herschell Company	K, R, H	
Space Age	1965	Hampton Amusements	M, K, R, H	
Traffic Jam	1968	Hampton Amusements	M, K, R, H	
Misfit Bug	1976	HERCO, Inc.	M, K, R, H, T	
Balloon Flite	1982	Bradley & Kaye	M, K, R, H	
Swing Thing	1985	Zamperla	K, R, H	
Mini-Himalaya	1987	Venture Rides Manufacturing	M*, K, R, H, T	
Mini Pirate	2002	SBF VISA International	K, R, H, T	

The Hollow

Name	Opened	Manufacturer	Height Requirement	Ref(s)
Sweet Swing	2014	Zamperla	K, R, H, T	

Kissing Tower Hill

Name	Opened	Manufacturer	Height Requirement	Ref(s)
Convoy	1990	Zamperla	M*, K, R, H, T	
Frog Hopper	1999	S&S Power	M, K, R, H, T	

Midway America

Name	Opened	Manufacturer	Height Requirement	Ref(s)
Pony Parade	1979	W.F. Mangles Company	M, K, R, H	
Granny Bugs	1985	Hampton/Venture Rides	M, K, R, H	
Tiny Tracks	1995	Zamperla	M*, K, R, H	

Pioneer Frontier

Name	Opened	Manufacturer	Height Requirement	Ref(s)
Livery Stables	1979	W.F. Mangles Company	K, R, H	
Mini Scrambler	2002	Eli Bridge Company	M, K, R	
Red Baron	1990	Zamperla	K, R, H	

== Park entertainment ==
This is a list of entertainment which is available in Hersheypark.

Seasonal availability
Hersheypark In The Dark
Hersheypark Christmas Candylane

Attraction	Opened	Manufacturer or Operator	Ref(s)
Aquatheater	1972	Hershey Estates	
Country Grill	1974	Hershey Estates	
Music Box Theater	1975	Hershey Estates	
ZooAmerica	1978	Hershey Entertainment & Resorts	
Santa's Stables	1997	Hershey Entertainment & Resorts	
Midway Tent	1999	Hershey Entertainment & Resorts	
Hershey Sweet Lights (not returning for 2026)	2003	Hershey Entertainment & Resorts	
Treatville	2006	Hershey Entertainment & Resorts	
N.O.E.L. (Night of Extraordinary Lights)	2009	Hershey Entertainment & Resorts	
12 Days of Christmas	2015	Hershey Entertainment & Resorts	

== Park regions ==
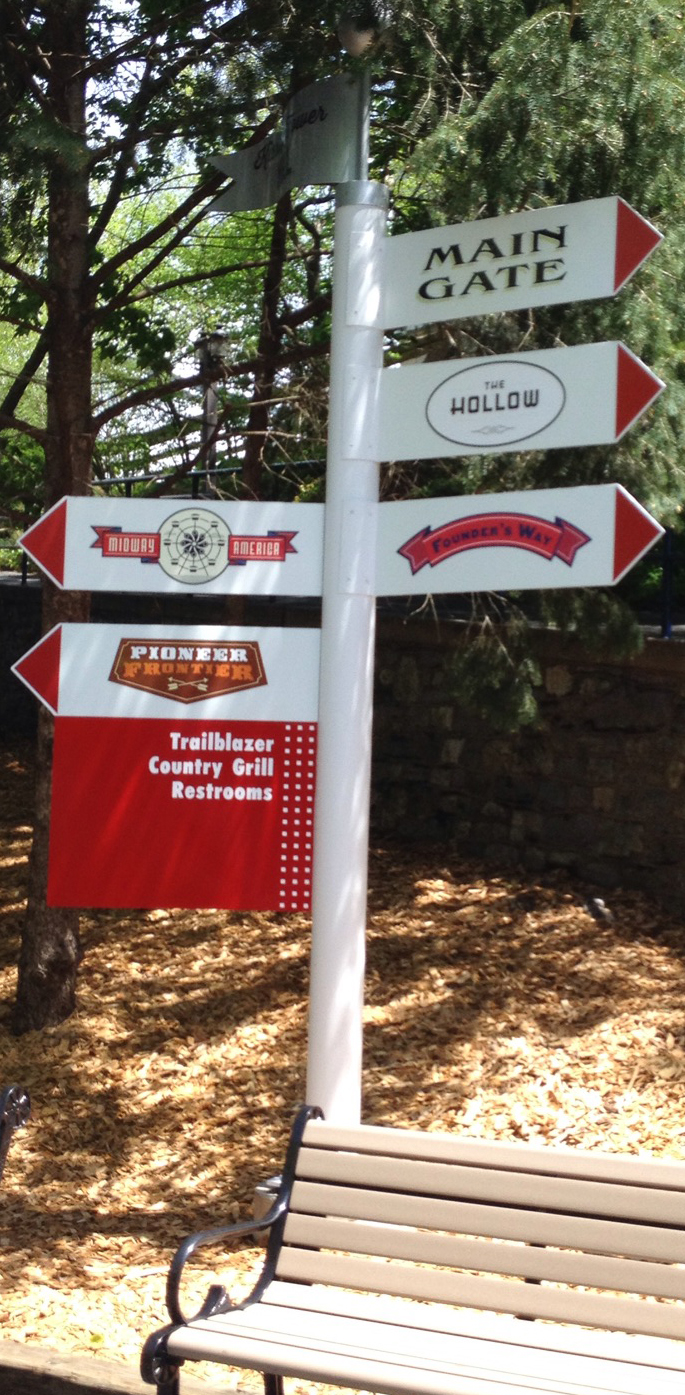
This is a directional sign pointing the way to some of the regions in the park

Like most theme parks, Hersheypark also has themed regions of the park. There are 8 regions currently in the park, including ZooAmerica. For the list of former regions in Hersheypark, see List of former Hersheypark attractions, past park regions.

Themed regions located in Hersheypark
Region	Opened	Description	Ref(s)
ZooAmerica	1978	This region (also considered an attraction) opened in 1978 and operates year-round. The area ZooAmerica uses was previously Hershey Park Zoo, from 1910 to 1971. This was the first expansion for Hersheypark after the early 1970s renovations. ZooAmerica features animals from North America and is divided up into regions.	
Pioneer Frontier	1984	This region was created over two years in 1984 and 1985. However, the area was called the "Old West" in 1984. The latest addition was Mix'd, Flavored By Jolly Rancher in 2022.	
Midway America	1996	This region of the park is themed to be an American fair-like area. The latest addition of the area was Wildcat's Revenge, a conversion of the second Wildcat, in 2023.	
The Boardwalk	2007	This region is a water park situated in between the Midway America and Pioneer Frontier section of the park. It includes previously standing water rides in the area, as well as new additions, some of which replaced older rides. The latest additions are Breaker's Edge and Whitecap Racer in 2018.	
The Hollow	2012	This region was originally called Comet Hollow. In 2012, it was rethemed as The Hollow when Skyrush was added. The latest additions were Sweet Swing and Tea Cups in 2014.	
Founder's Way	2014	This region was created when Tudor Square, Rhineland, Founder's Circle, and Music Box Way were all combined into one region. The latest addition of the area was Reese's Cupfusion in 2019.	
Kissing Tower Hill	2014	This region was a retheming of the Minetown area of the park. The latest addition of the area was Hershey Triple Tower in 2017.	
Hershey's Chocolatetown	2020	The newest region of the park, costing $150 million. Groundbreaking occurred on January 9, 2019. The area features new restaurants, shopping, Candymonium, and the newly relocated Carrousel.	
