= Great Bear (roller coaster) =

Roller coaster at Hersheypark

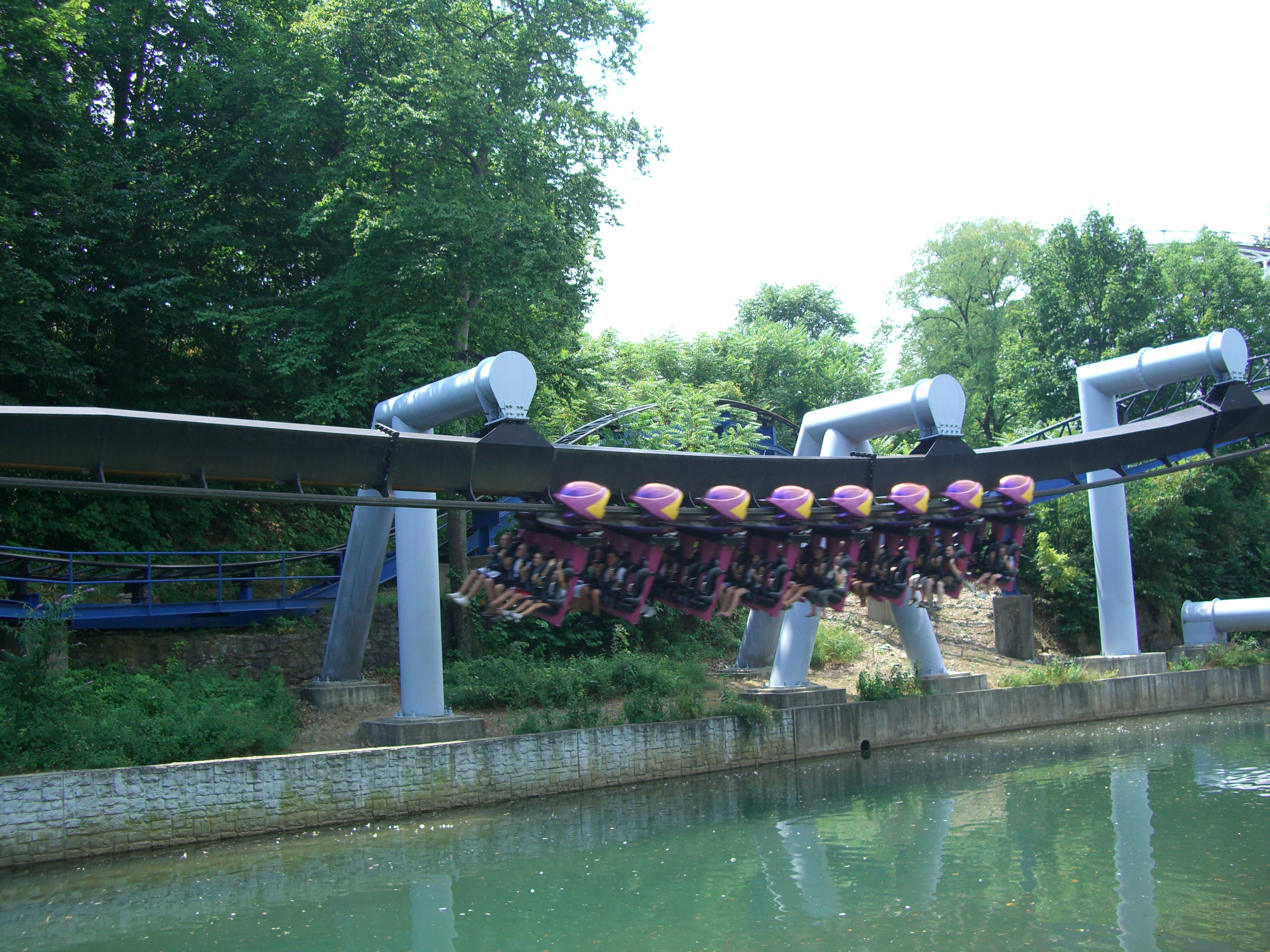
- A train next to Spring Creek

Hersheypark
- Location: Hersheypark
- Park section: Kissing Tower Hill
- Coordinates: 40°17′13″N 76°39′11″W
- Status: Operating
- Opening date: May 23, 1998
- Cost: US$13,000,000 ($25.7 million in 2025 dollars)

General statistics
- Type: Steel – Inverted
- Manufacturer: Bolliger & Mabillard
- Designer: Werner Stengel
- Model: Inverted Coaster
- Lift/launch system: Chain lift hill
- Height: 90 ft (27 m)
- Drop: 124 ft (38 m)
- Length: 2,800 ft (850 m)
- Speed: 58 mph (93 km/h)
- Inversions: 4
- Duration: 2:55
- Capacity: 1,300 riders per hour
- Restraint style: Over-the-shoulder
- Trains: 2 trains with 8 cars; riders arranged 4 across in a single row for a total of 32 riders per train
- Great Bear at RCDB

Great Bear is an inverted roller coaster located at Hersheypark in Hershey, Pennsylvania, United States. Designed and manufactured by Bolliger & Mabillard, with additional design from Werner Stengel, the roller coaster opened on May 23, 1998, in the Minetown section of the park. Great Bear was the first inverted looping coaster in Pennsylvania and cost $13 million, the largest project Hersheypark undertook at the time. The roller coaster reaches a maximum height of 90 feet (27 m), a maximum speed of 58 miles per hour (93 km/h) to 60 miles per hour (97 km/h), and has a total track length of 2,800 feet (850 m).

When Great Bear opened, it was the sixth roller coaster in operation at Hersheypark, as well as the fourth steel roller coaster at the park. The layout of the roller coaster was designed to weave through several attractions, including a steel roller coaster named SooperDooperLooper; a log flume named Coal Cracker; and Spring Creek. The ride is named after the constellation Ursa Major, and its major elements represent the number of stars within the constellation. Upon opening to the public, the roller coaster received positive reviews from critics and guests.

== History ==
After the opening of Sidewinder, a steel shuttle roller coaster in 1991, the park considered in its long-term goals to add a bigger steel roller coaster for the coming decade. Great Bear was part of the Hershey Entertainment and Resorts Company's five-year plan, alongside an expansion to its Hershey Lodge and Convention Center at an estimated $26 million, as well as renovations for the Hersheypark Arena. The park conducted surveys showing that guests wanted the park to add roller coasters.

During the planning stages, Jeff Budgeon, then the park's planning, engineering, and maintenance director, said that park executives did not want to build record-breaking roller coasters because these would not equate to better thrills and would be expensive. Four manufacturers presented proposals to Hersheypark that would be designed specifically for the park's layout and terrain. Ultimately, the park chose Swiss manufacturer Bolliger & Mabillard (B&M).

Hersheypark announced on August 19, 1997, its intentions to build a $13 million roller coaster (equivalent to $26 million in 2025) for the 1998 operating season. Named the Great Bear, the attraction would be a steel inverted roller coaster built by B&M. At the time, the closest roller coaster similar to the Great Bear was located at Six Flags Great Adventure in Jackson Township, New Jersey. The park's general manager said the project would constitute "the largest sum of money ever spent on a single attraction at Hersheypark". Ground breaking and construction of the Great Bear started in mid-November. By December, excavation work was completed, with concrete foundation work taking place for the track and station. In the same month, track work began to be assembled on site.

In the new year, the park would increase admission prices because of the construction of Great Bear. A press conference was held on March 31, for media to view the Great Bear which was nearing completion with all of the track work in place. To be finished were the electrical wiring for the controls and testing the roller coaster. The roller coaster was revealed to media personnel on May 22, to ride, and opened to the public a day later on May 23 during the park's 92nd operating season. It was the most expensive roller coaster ever constructed in the park, as well as the first inverted looping coaster in Pennsylvania. To promote the Great Bear, Hersheypark created a 30-second television advertisement called "Brave Souls". At the end of 1998, the International Association of Amusement Parks and Attractions gave the commercial a Brass Ring Award for "originality, creativity, and excellence in marketing". In its first five seasons of operation, the Great Bear attracted an average of 1.2 million riders annually.

== Ride experience ==
After the floor drops down slightly beneath the train, riders exit the station begins to climb a 90-foot (27 m) tall lift hill. After cresting the lift, the train begins a sweeping helix to the left. Following this turn, riders plunge into a 124-foot (38 m) drop into The Hollow. The train enters a 100-foot (30 m) vertical loop, then racing straight through a shallow pit towards onlookers, followed by an Immelmann loop. After the Immelmann, the train curves slightly right into a zero-g roll. The train continues through The Hollow, passing over walkways and heading towards SooperDooperLooper and Comet, then making a sharp left turn over Spring Creek. Due to the presence of Spring Creek, the train passes over several unconventional support structures wrapping under and around the train. The train whips into a corkscrew, and then two wide turns, first to the left, then the right, skirting around SooperDooperLooper's vertical loop. Following another slight curve to the left, over the Coal Cracker flume ride, riders photos are taken and the train enters the final brake run. After the brake run, the train curves to the right and returns to the station. One cycle of the roller coaster is about 175 seconds long.

== Characteristics ==
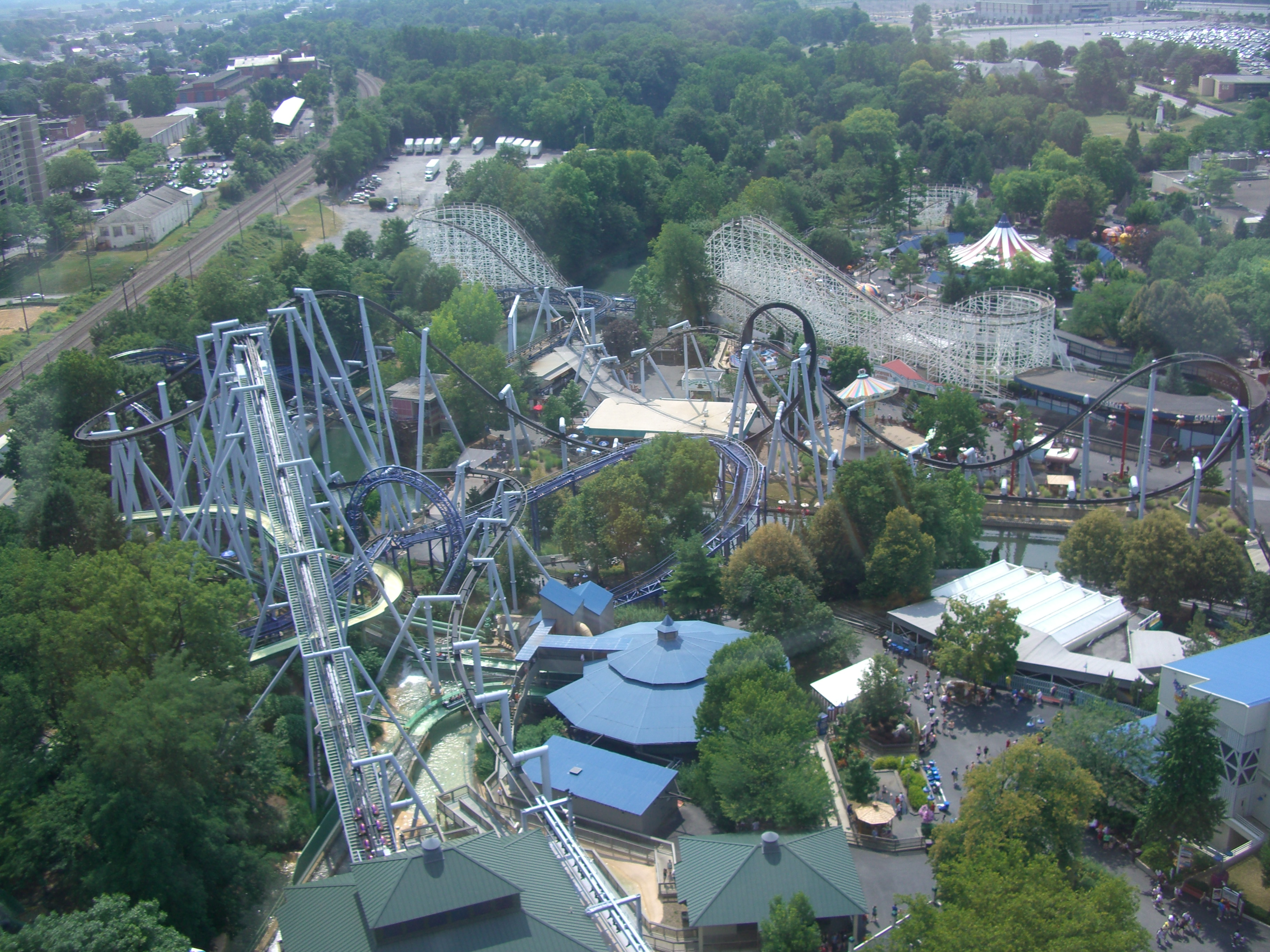
Great Bear (black track, blue supports) as viewed from the Kissing Tower in 2007, with SooperDooperLooper at center left, Comet in the background, and Coal Cracker beneath Great Bear on the left

The roller coaster is a custom Inverted Coaster model, designed and manufactured by Bolliger & Mabillard; Werner Stengel assisted with the design. Most of the ride's components were manufactured in the United States. Due to its proximity to other attractions, the roller coaster was one of Bolliger & Mabillard's most difficult projects to design. General construction was undertaken by Wickersham Construction and Engineering, which built the foundations and buildings for the roller coaster. Sources cite the ride as being supported by 214 or 217 piers. Its construction included 4,500 yd (4,100 m) of concrete and 2,000,000 pounds (910,000 kg) of steel. The Great Bear was the sixth roller coaster to be built at the park and the fourth steel roller coaster.

When the Great Bear opened, the roller coaster was located in the Minetown section of the park close by the Kissing Tower. The Great Bear's location in the Minetown section was chosen as it was a lesser traversed area of the park since the inclusion of several attractions elsewhere. The roller coaster's location was also thought to better fan out guests as to not overload existing facilities. Another area considered for the roller coaster was the Midway America section, themed to the early twentieth century, but was said to be "too modern" by Jeff Budgeon. To accommodate the roller coaster, a mini golf course and a building were removed. The Great Bear's designed layout would weave through nearby steel roller coaster SooperDooperLooper and log flume Coal Cracker to add a more thrilling experience. The ride also passes just over Spring Creek, which winds through Hersheypark. The Great Bear covers at least 5 acres (2.0 ha) of land and was built on a hill. Netting is placed below portions of the track to catch objects from inverting riders.

The roller coaster was named after the constellation Ursa Major; seven elements of the roller coaster represent the stars of the constellation. The name also references the Hershey Bears, a local American Hockey League team. The station of the roller coaster used to be host to a catering venue as well as a former Sky Ride stop. The track is about 2,800 feet (850 m) long. The color scheme includes black track with light grey supports, and the trains are shades of purple, pink, and yellow. The top speed of Great Bear is either 58 miles per hour (93 km/h) or 60 miles per hour (97 km/h). Each of the two trains can accommodate 32 passengers, arranged in eight rows with four to a single row. There is a separate queue for the front row of seating. The trains use over-the-shoulder restraints. Each train contains 32 upstop wheels, placed beneath the rail; 32 guide wheels, placed beside the rail; and 32 road wheels, placed above the rail.

The track is flanked by two pairs of on-ride cameras, which are controlled remotely. When a train passes by, each of the cameras snaps eight riders' photos in about eight-tenths of a second. These photos are displayed on monitors at the ride's exit, where guests' photos could be combined. According to the Lancaster, Pennsylvania, New Era, "the system ensures customers won't have strangers in the photo they buy". The ride is controlled by two computers in the basement of the station; one of the computers is responsible for the day-to-day operation, while the other is used as a backup. The computers record data from green "proxy switches" underneath the lift hill, which record the train's location, speed, and other statistics. In addition, pairs of light sensors, known as "photo eyes", are mounted above the track to detect obstructions. A beam of light shines between each pair of "photo eyes", and the ride automatically shuts down if the light beam is obstructed.

== Reception ==
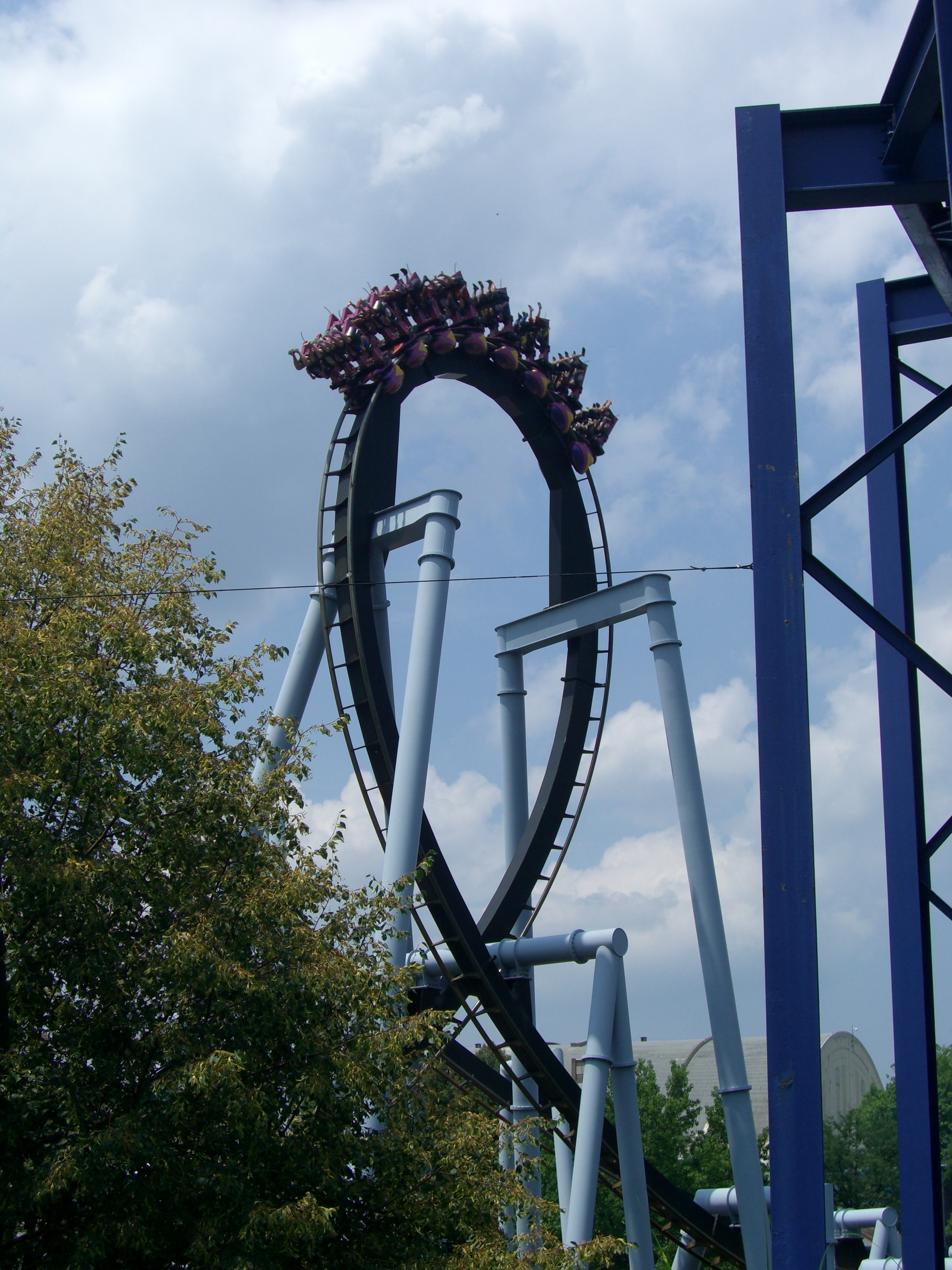
A train inverting on the vertical loop

Upon opening, Great Bear received generally positives reviews from guests and critics. Aliah Wright, a reporter for the Associated Press, noted a guests' reaction to the roller coaster, who stated they were "amazed" and noting a great sense of fear because of footchopper elements. Thomas Flannery, a staff member for the Intelligencer Journal who attended the media preview, simply related the experience of Great Bear to that of a fighter pilot. Sara Barton, a writer for the Lancaster New Era, dramatically recounted her ride experience on the Great Bear as "not nice", stating the roller coater "is not normal". Barton had personally disliked the experience having come off nauseous after her second ride, though her fellow reporter, Jane Holahan, had favored the experience wanting to ride "for fun".

Elizabeth Arneson of the Lebanon, Pennsylvania, Daily News wrote: "The Great Bear paradoxically gives riders an exhilarating sense of freedom while they're strapped securely into a seat." Out of all the roller coasters Arneson rode at the park, the Great Bear was "the star of the day". Lin Weisenstein of the Daily Record wrote in August 1998 that, though no seat was bad on the roller coaster, "the flying sensation up front is out of this world". Weisenstein further commented that the Great Bear was "pure pleasure", remarking positively of the smooth ride without head banging.

== See also ==
- Alpengeist, a Bolliger & Mabillard custom Inverted Coaster model at Busch Gardens Williamsburg
- Batman: The Ride, a Bolliger & Mabillard Inverted Coaster model at several Six Flags parks
- Afterburn (roller coaster), a Bolliger & Mabillard custom Inverted Coaster model at Carowinds
