= Roller Soaker =

Former ride at Hersheypark

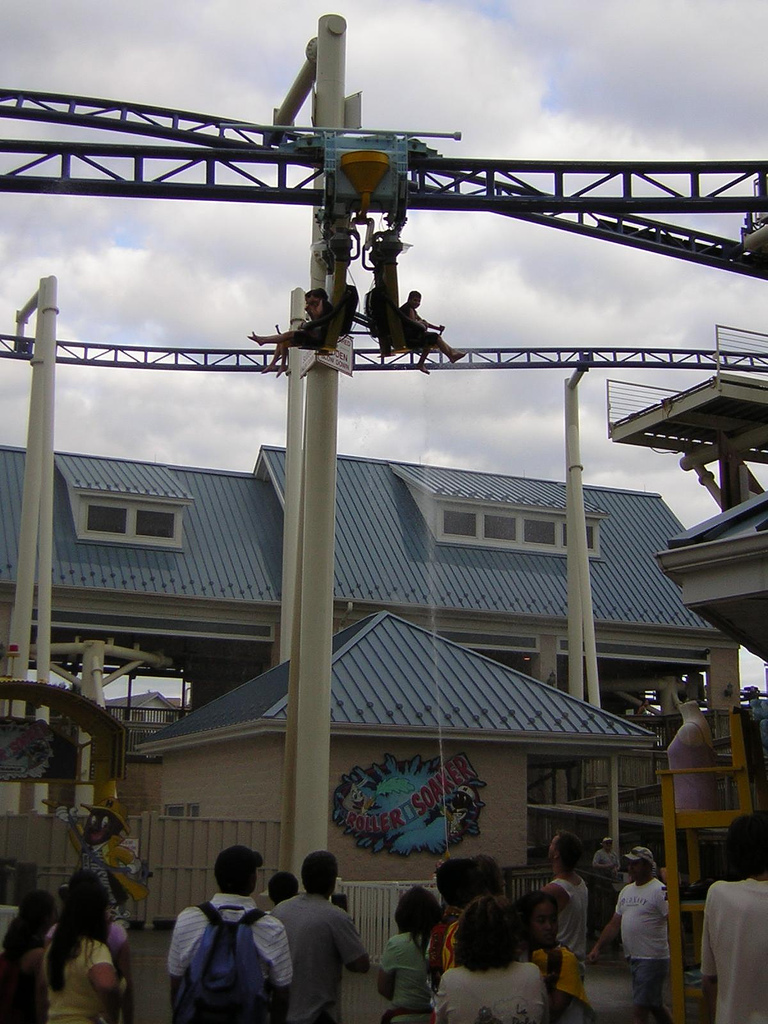
- A car traversing the roller coaster's route

Hersheypark
- Location: Hersheypark
- Park section: The Boardwalk
- Coordinates: 40°17′29″N 76°39′11″W
- Status: Removed
- Opening date: May 11, 2002
- Closing date: September 3, 2012
- Cost: USD$7.5 million – $8 million
- Replaced by: Sprayground; Breakers Edge Water Coaster

General statistics
- Type: Steel – Suspended
- Manufacturer: Setpoint Inc.
- Model: Swing Thing
- Lift/launch system: Chain lift hill
- Height: 70 ft (21 m)
- Length: 1,300 ft (400 m)
- Speed: 20.5 mph (33.0 km/h)
- Restraint style: Lap bar
- Trains: 9 trains with a single car; riders arranged 2 across in 2 rows for a total of 4 riders per train
- Roller Soaker at RCDB

Roller Soaker was a suspended roller coaster at Hersheypark in Hershey, Pennsylvania, United States. Manufactured by Setpoint Inc., the roller coaster was announced on August 8, 2001, and opened to the public on May 11, 2002. The Roller Soaker was located in the Boardwalk section at the park and cost $7.5 million to $8 million to construct. In December 2012, Hersheypark announced that the Roller Soaker would be removed to make way for new water attractions in 2013. The roller coaster's station was reused by Breakers Edge Water Coaster, a water coaster added in 2018.

The Roller Soaker was the second Swing Thing model to be built by Setpoint Inc., following the Flying Super Saturator at Carowinds. The roller coaster reached a maximum height of 70 feet (21 m), with a maximum speed of 20.5 miles per hour (33.0 km/h), and a total track length of 1,300 feet (400 m). The encompassing section of the Roller Soaker featured various interactive water elements, such as water sprayers as well as geysers and fountains. Upon opening, the roller coaster received generally positive reviews.

== History ==
Prior to the construction of what later became the Roller Soaker, Hersheypark had built a wooden roller coaster named Lightning Racer, which began operating in May 2000 as the park's eighth roller coaster. Planning for the new attraction began two and a half years before its opening. The park chose Setpoint's suspended roller coaster model based on a visit by Hershey executives to Carowinds, an amusement park in Charlotte, North Carolina, where the Flying Super Saturator was located. The park liked the concept of the suspended roller coaster, as it would appeal to a wider guest demographic, instead of trying to entice visitors through constructing taller or faster roller coasters as other theme parks were. The roller coaster was redesigned eight times throughout its planning process as to navigate around obstacles within the park and existing utilities.

The park announced on August 8, 2001, that it would add a new roller coaster for the 2002 season. The attraction would incorporate elements of a water ride and a suspended roller coaster. The roller coaster would interact with the nearby Canyon River Rapids and park visitors through various water stations. Plans for the attraction were being finalized during the announcement with an expected opening date of May 2002. A contest was held to determine the roller coaster's name. Seven thousand entrants submitted 10,000 names; the park ultimately selected the name "Roller Soaker", which was announced at the roller coaster's groundbreaking ceremony.

Construction of the Roller Soaker began in November 2001. The park planned to open the Roller Soaker the day after the majority of water rides opened for the season. A media day was hosted for the Roller Soaker on May 7, later opening to the general public on May 11 during the park's 95th operating season. Along with the roller coaster, the park constructed a gift shop, lockers, and restroom. In addition, the plaza included a children's area.

Rumors of the Roller Soaker's sale began to spread when it was listed on the attraction e-commerce website "Rides4U" in August 2012. A park spokesperson later refuted the listing, stating another company inquired about obtaining the roller coaster but the park did not want to sell. The Roller Soaker closed on September 3. In December, the park announced that the Roller Soaker would be replaced after 10 years of operation. In the same month, Aycock Construction began demolishing the Roller Soaker, replacing it with a 5,000-square-foot (460 m^{2}) sprayground for the 2013 season. The Breakers Edge Water Coaster, which opened in May 2018, reuses the Roller Soaker's station.

== Characteristics ==
The roller coaster was located in the northwest region of the park in the Boardwalk section, near Lightning Racer and Canyon River Rapids. The Roller Soaker and accompanying water features covered 2 acres (0.81 hectares). The station of the roller coaster was designed by local architect Nathan Fry, and crafted with materials already at the park. Along the roller coaster's layout were several water effects that would interact with riders. On the roller coaster were three water curtains, with automatic geysers and fountains that would shoot from the ground. Guests could use various colored water sprayers, 16 of which to aim towards riders.

The Roller Soaker was a custom designed Swing Thing model manufactured by Setpoint Inc. The Roller Soaker was the second Swing Thing model to be built after the Flying Super Saturator. The suspended roller coaster's steel, tubular track had a length of 1,300 feet (400 m). The roller coaster reached a maximum height of 70 feet (21 m) and reached a maximum speed of 20.5 miles per hour (33.0 km/h). The Roller Soaker navigated through several wide turns, taking about a minute and a half to complete. The track was colored a light blue with the supports a sandy yellow. The Roller Soaker was the park's first attraction to feature characters that depicted Hershey products. It cost around $7.5 to $8 million and was the ninth roller coaster in operation at the park.

To conserve water, the park used its own well water and reused around 75 to 85 percent of drained water. Recycled water and rain water would be filtered before being reused. An underground storage tank could contain 9,000 US gallons (34,000 L) of water for the attraction. The roller coaster operated with 9 cars that navigated the route. There were four riders per car that were arranged in two rows with two seats across each. The two rows were configured back-to-back with two facing forward and two backwards. Each car featured a lap bar restraint system and with each car being able to swivel. Each rider was given 4 US gallons (15 L) of water, totaling 16 US gallons (61 L) of water for each car. The water could be dropped from the car on park visitors with a lever pull.

== Reception ==
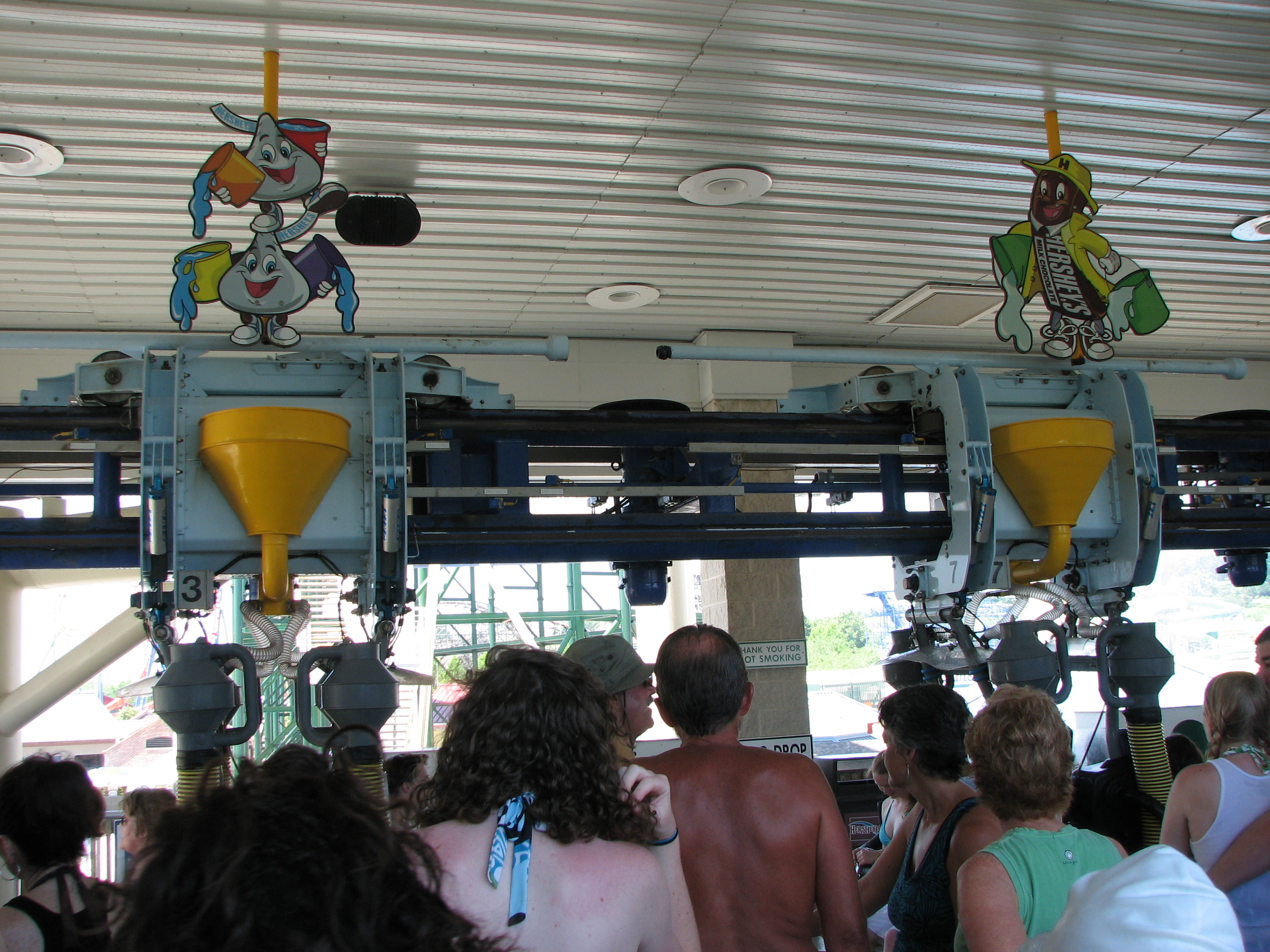
The Roller Soaker's loading area with buckets being refilled

Upon opening at the park, the Roller Soaker received generally positive reviews from guests and critics. Lyford M. Moore, writer for the Courier-Post, recorded visitors' reactions to the Roller Soaker, with some visitors enjoying the roller coaster's water features, and some noting how much they got soaked. Moore also compared the timing of pulling the ride's water lever to a "fighter pilot lining up a target", as landing water on guests was challenging. Jeff Cronin, a reporter for The Sentinel, detailed the frequent water features along the course of the roller coaster that gave "a good dose of water every few seconds" which would soak riders. Cronin also observed the prominent views the ride gave of nearby attractions and the park. Jane Holahand, a writer for the Lancaster New Era, described the roller coaster ride experience as a mild form of the nearby inverted roller coaster, Great Bear, highlighting the Roller Soaker's first drop and seemingly fast-paced turns. Holahand further described the water portion of the experience similar to a "car wash with the top down", with ponchos being of little help, expecting visitors to get drenched. Randy Kraft, a writer for The Morning Call, remarked about the simple layout that will get riders wet. Kraft also pointed out the backwards ride experience being more of a thrill while getting less soaked and the forward experience for its first drop.

== See also ==
- Canopy Flyer, another Setpoint Swing Thing model roller coaster
