= Jolly Rancher Remix =

Shuttle roller coaster at Hersheypark

- Previously known as Sidewinder (1991–2021)
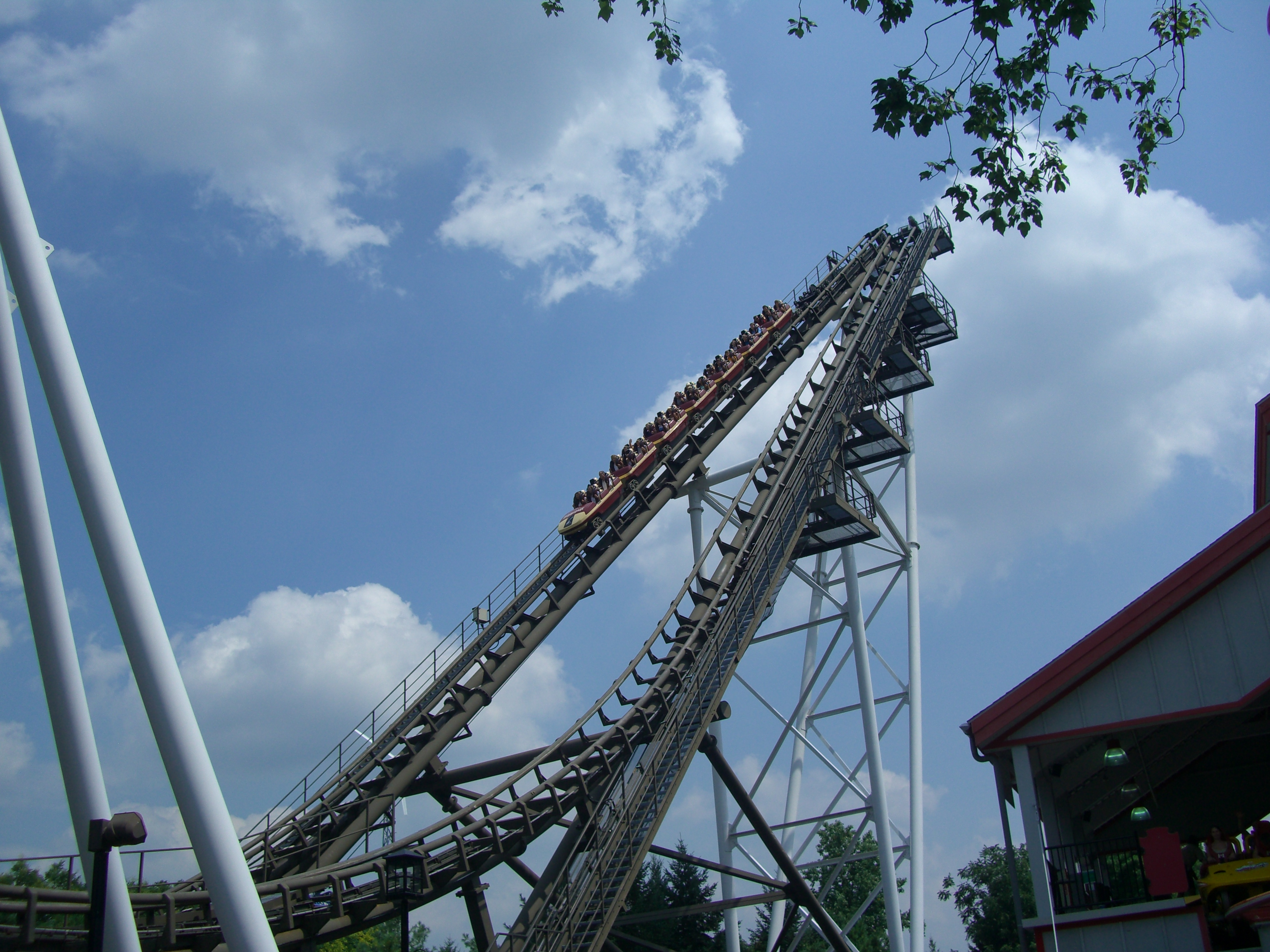
- A view of a train ascending the catch car lift hill, when it was known as the Sidewinder

Hersheypark
- Location: Hersheypark
- Park section: Pioneer Frontier
- Coordinates: 40°17′24″N 76°39′14″W
- Status: Operating
- Opening date: May 11, 1991
- Cost: USD$4.2 million ($9.93 million in 2025 dollars)

General statistics
- Type: Steel – Shuttle
- Manufacturer: Vekoma
- Model: Boomerang
- Lift/launch system: Catch car and chain lift hill
- Height: 116.5 ft (35.5 m)
- Length: 935 ft (285 m)
- Speed: 47 mph (76 km/h)
- Inversions: 3 (traversed twice)
- Duration: 1:48
- G-force: 5.2
- Restraint style: Vest with seat belt
- Trains: Single train with 7 cars; riders arranged 2 across in 2 rows for a total of 28 riders per train
- Jolly Rancher Remix at RCDB

Jolly Rancher Remix (formerly Sidewinder) is a steel shuttle roller coaster located at Hersheypark in Hershey, Pennsylvania, United States. A Boomerang model manufactured by Vekoma and designed by Peter Clerx, the roller coaster originally opened as the Sidewinder on May 11, 1991. The roller coaster debuted in the Pioneer Frontier section of the park and cost $4.2 million. The Sidewinder was the first roller coaster installed in the park in 14 years since the SooperDooperLooper in 1977 and the fourth roller coaster in operation to be built. The roller coaster has a maximum height of 116.5 ft (35.5 m), with a maximum speed of 47 mph (76 km/h), and a track length of 935 ft (285 m).

Hersheypark converted the area surrounding the roller coaster to the theme of Jolly Rancher candy during the winter months of 2022. The re-themed roller coaster opened to the public on May 28, 2022, alongside a Zamperla Nebulaz flat ride, with several elements added to the roller coaster, including upgrades to the ride system, a tunnel, and different sensory effects. Upon opening, both iterations of the roller coaster received mostly positive reviews from critics and guests.

== History ==
=== Development and opening ===
During its planning stages, Hersheypark officials wanted an attraction that was both thrilling and would fit a small space within the park. They were also seeking to increase public interest in Hersheypark. Park officials had discussions with officials from Knott's Berry Farm about their Boomerang model roller coaster, aptly named Boomerang. After executives rode a similar Boomerang model in Wildwood, New Jersey, Frank Shearer, then vice president of sports and entertainment for Herco Inc., had stated the roller coaster model would be a great fit for the park. Surveys conducted over the course of two years before opening indicated guests were interested in a new roller coaster.

The park submitted plans to the zoning board of Derry Township, Pennsylvania, in 1990 to build a 125 ft (38 m) roller coaster in a 40 ft (12 m) height-limited commercial district. Jeff Budgeon, then a park engineer at Hersheypark, had spoken to the board in September about the attraction and its safety reputation. The roller coaster was discussed as being a Boomerang model from Vekoma, the manufacturer having built twenty at the time, all operating without incident. The roller coaster was planned to be located in the Pioneer Frontier section. The attraction would be the largest thrill ride constructed at the park since the 1977 addition of steel roller coaster SooperDooperLooper and the only Boomerang model in Pennsylvania. To be named Sidewinder, a formal announcement would be held once the plans were approved.

Construction began in September 1990 for the attraction. The first track pieces arrived at Hersheypark in January 1991, expecting to open with the park for the season beginning in May. The park formally announced Sidewinder in the same month as a 105 ft (32 m) structure that would traverse riders forwards and backwards through a combination of inversions. The park disclosed the completion of the roller coaster structure in March, with the station and operating system in construction. Construction on the entirety of the roller coaster finished in April, with landscaping and testing to be completed. A charity event was to be held in the days preceding the roller coaster's official opening by local high school students for the Muscular Dystrophy Association. A preview for the roller coaster was hosted by the park on May 2, and the ride officially opened to the public on May 11, during the park's 85th operating season.

=== Conversion to Jolly Rancher Remix ===
After Sidewinder had been operating for about thirty years, Hersheypark decided to revitalize the attraction. Park officials had recently added several new contemporary additions, such as Reese's Cupfusion and Whitecap Racer, to provide distinct experiences for guests. With several other rides at the park themed around candy products and to revitalize the area, the park chose the Jolly Rancher candy as the new theme for the roller coaster to provide distinct experiences through certain ride elements. Conversion of the roller coaster took place during the winter off-season in 2022.

The park announced that Sidewinder would officially be renamed Jolly Rancher Remix and themed around the Jolly Rancher candy brand on February 22, 2022. Alongside the redevelopment, the park would be adding a new Zamperla Nebulaz flat ride named Mix'd Flavored by Jolly Rancher. The re-branded roller coaster would take passengers through a tunnel with lights, music, and scents corresponding to one of five Jolly Rancher flavors chosen at random. The park announced that the attractions would open later in May. A media preview for the two attractions was held on May 26, and they opened to the public on May 28. During the summer, multiple restaurant venues in the park offered Jolly Rancher-related items connected to the opening of the new rides.

== Ride experience ==
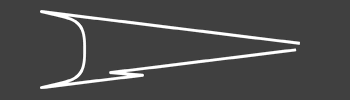
The layout of a Boomerang model roller coaster

Passengers enter the train, where the "virtual DJ" host of the roller coaster announces the ride's name, initiating the Jolly Rancher-designed lights to flicker five candy colors above passengers in the station. Once a color is selected, the host announces the flavor, beginning the ride's cycle.

The roller coaster begins with the train being pulled backward out of the station and up the 116.5 ft (35.5 m) lift hill by a catch car. At the top of the lift hill, the train is released and speeds through the station, where it enters a cobra roll. Exiting the cobra roll, the train enters the tunnel, where a matching scent to the one selected by the host can be smelled by passengers. The train then traverses into a vertical loop and goes up, ascending the chain lift hill. When the train reaches the top, the lift disengages, and the train falls backward through the inversions and tunnel before returning to the station. One cycle of the roller coaster takes about a minute and fifty seconds to complete.

== Characteristics ==
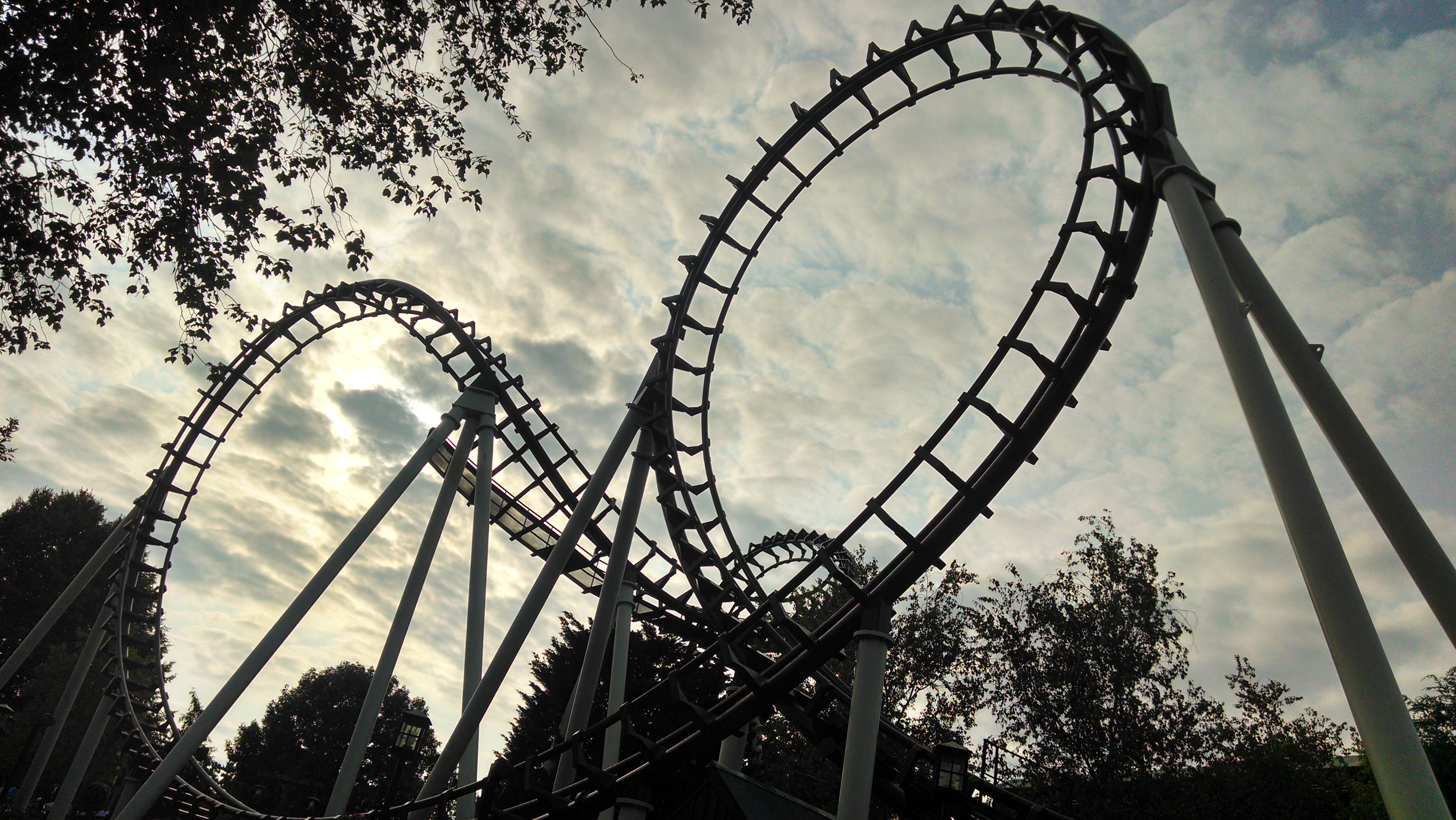
A view of the roller coaster's three inversions

Jolly Rancher Remix is a Boomerang model manufactured by Vekoma International of the Netherlands and designed by Peter Clerx. The roller coaster originally cost $4.2 million to plan and construct and opened in the Pioneer Frontier section of the park. The roller coaster is located near the Canyon River Rapids and replaced a dining area that was relocated elsewhere in the park. The original title of Sidewinder was named after the general sidewinder rattlesnake species. It was the fourth roller coaster to be added to the park in operation and the first roller coaster to open since the SooperDooperLooper in 1977, 14 years earlier. When it opened, it was the only Boomerang model in Pennsylvania. The area surrounding the roller coaster was updated during its refurbishment, featuring a new entrance and plaza. The Mix'd Flavored by Jolly Rancher flat ride is located in front of the roller coaster, having replaced a clock tower and planters.

Jolly Rancher Remix is a steel shuttle roller coaster in which the train returns from the direction it came. The roller coaster structure of Jolly Rancher Remix encompasses a 288.8 ft (88.0 m) by 98.4 ft (30.0 m) area. Sources cite the track having a total length of 876 ft (267 m) or 935 ft (285 m). Jolly Rancher Remix exerts 5.2 g-forces to its riders and reaches speeds of 47 mph (76 km/h). The track was originally colored brown with white supports. During the renovation, lights were added to the station and lift hill alongside a soundtrack to play with each candy flavor experience. In addition, the park updated the braking system during the renovation. The track and support structure feature a new color scheme that includes green and blue, respectively.

The roller coaster operates a single train consisting of seven cars with four seats each for a total capacity of 28 riders per train. The original trains featured a red and yellow color scheme; this was changed to a blue and yellow theme in 2011 when newer trains were added to the coaster. The 2011 trains were replaced in 2022; the new trains feature a blue and green color scheme. Riders were originally secured using an over-the-shoulder restraint; the current 2022 trains use a vest restraint.

== Reception ==
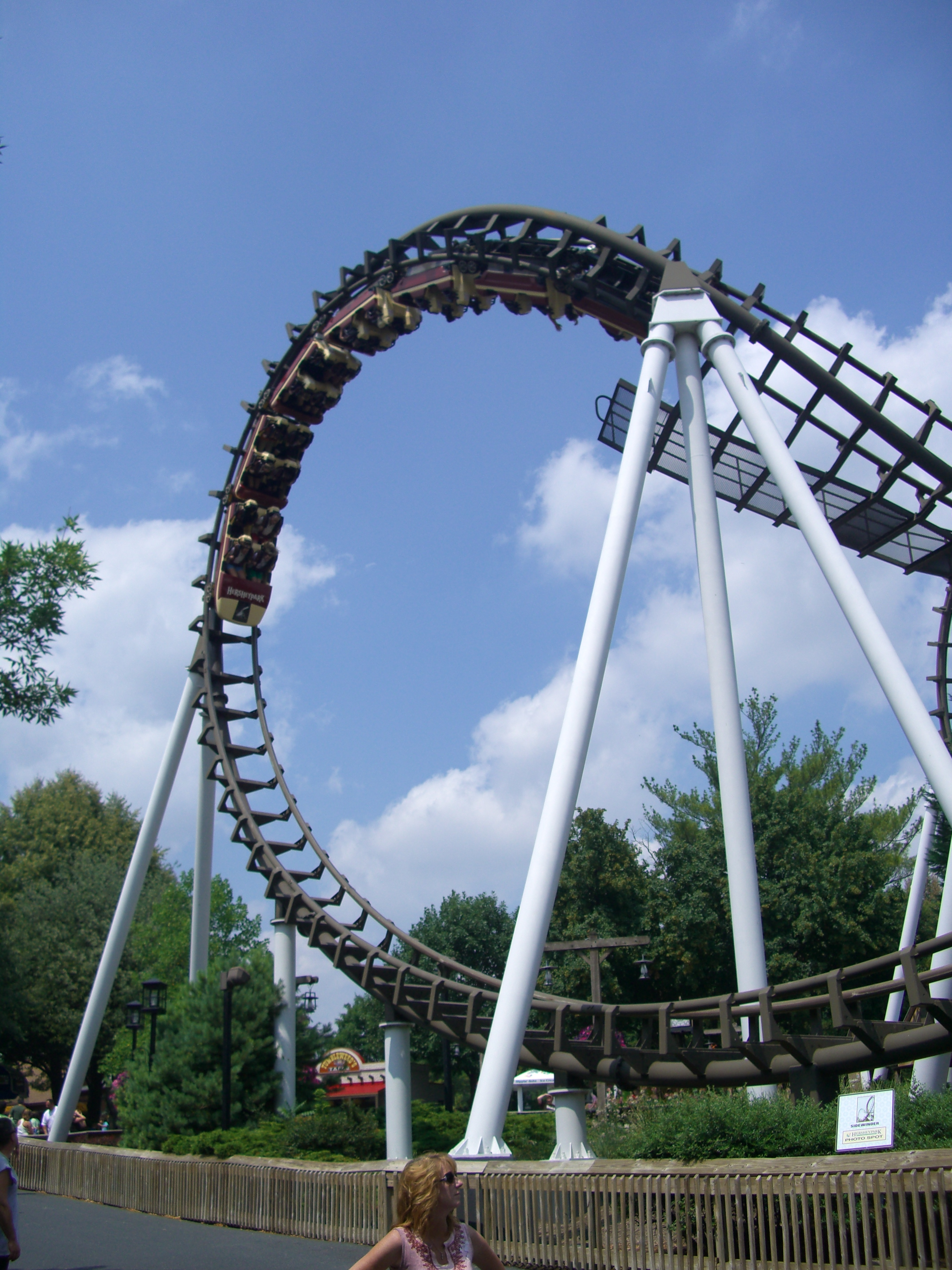
A train inverted in the cobra roll element, when the roller coaster was known as the Sidewinder

The roller coaster received mostly positive reviews from critics and guests upon its original opening in 1991. Shelly Stallsmith, an editor for The Sentinel, and Michael Argento, a writer for the York Daily Record, recorded the reactions from Milton Hershey School children during the preview event, with some commenting it was "intense", some noting the ride's fast speed and forces, and some commenting on the forward and backward experiences. Stallsmith personally considered that the roller coaster delivered on Hersheypark's advertising promise of "non-stop excitement" and stated that there was no "wasted space" during the ride's entire experience. Argento individually expressed that the Sidewinder would make riders a bit nauseous and unstable but want to ride again as it was fun.

Randy Kraft, a writer for The Morning Call, stated that the ride "is a totally disorienting experience" for riders who do not enjoy inversions on roller coasters. Kraft also recorded guests' reactions, with one stating the ride was "wonderful" while another commented it was "not as bad as [expected]". John Lines, a staff report for the Intelligencer Journal, commented the Sidewinder was "a dramatic improvement over" the park's other steel looping roller coaster, the SooperDooperLooper. Though, Lines further commented that it was hard to beat the park's wooden roller coaster, the Comet. Wendie Wells, writing for Lebanon, Pennsylvania's Daily News, remarked that the roller coaster was "all that was promised and more in the way of thrills" and even more so in the second half of the ride. Wells concluded that the Sidewinder was a "torture on a person's equilibrium" but "also addictive", requiring more than one ride to enjoy.

Upon its opening in 2022, the converted roller coaster received mostly positive reviews from critics and guests. Sean Adams, a writer for The Patriot-News, ranked the Jolly Rancher Remix among "the middle of the pack" of Hersheypark's roller coasters for its excitement and appeal. However, Adams noted the incorporation of new elements as "a good balance, not overwhelming the riders" while adding a unique experience. Kevin Stairiker, a writer for Lancaster Online, remarked that the extra theming brought "an improvement over the Sidewinder" experience. Stairiker additionally spotlighted the tunnel for its "smell and taste" of the candy's flavor.

Justin Landers, a writer for Behind the Thrills, concluded on his overall experience of the Jolly Rancher Remix as "fantastic", considering the color scheme, scents, lighting, and flat ride as contributing factors. Kyle, a writer for Coaster101, commented on the roller coaster's new paint and tunnel features, making it distinguished from other Boomerang model clones. Kyle also positively commented on the faint, but noticeable scent features in the tunnel portion and the smoothness of the attraction.

== See also ==
- Boomerang (Six Flags St. Louis), another Boomerang model manufactured by Vekoma
- Zoomerang (Lake Compounce), another Boomerang model manufactured by Vekoma
