= The Boardwalk at Hersheypark =

Amusement park attraction

- Interactive map of The Boardwalk at Hersheypark

Attractions
- Water rides: 15

Hersheypark
- Coordinates: 40.28766°N 76.65772°W
- Opened: 2007

The Boardwalk at Hersheypark is a themed area located at Hersheypark in Hershey, Pennsylvania. The Boardwalk at Hersheypark opened in 2007 to mark the 100th anniversary of the theme park opened by Milton S. Hershey in 1907. It originally featured five water‐based attractions and is the single biggest financial investment in the park's history, at a cost of $21 million USD.

== Features ==
There are five original features of The Boardwalk at Hersheypark.

- East Coast Waterworks- a seven-story tall water play structure with seven body waterslides, two tipping buckets, and nearly six-hundred different water play-toys.
- Coastline Plunge- a tube waterslide tower featuring four different waterslides: Vortex (Proslide Bowl), Riptide, Surge, and Whirlwind (Proslide Tornado).
- Sandcastle Cove- a children's play area with zero-depth entry designed just for young guests.
- Bayside Pier- a tidal pool with lapping waves to simulate a bay, featuring zero-depth entry and 48,000 gallons of water. Maximum depth: 3 ft.

== Expansion ==
In 2009, an expansion, known as The Boardwalk: The SEAquel, was built at a cost of US$17.6 million. This expansion includes two new water attractions: The Shore, a 378,000 gallon wave pool with zero-depth entry and a maximum depth of 6 ft, and Intercoastal Waterway, a 1,360 ft. long lazy river attraction with a uniform water depth of 2 1/2 ft. This expansion replaced the iconic Canyon River Rapids ride.

Due to ice storms and flooding during the 2008–2009 off-season, construction on the expansion was delayed. The new attractions were not open when the park opened at the beginning of the 2009 season on May 1. Instead, they opened on May 23, 2009.

In 2013, The Boardwalk was expanded again. This 2nd expansion includes three new water attractions: 2 new tube slides to the Coastline Plunge: Hydro and Pipeline, and Shoreline Sprayground- a children's splash area with misters, bubblers, water jets, and fountains designed just for young guests. The Shoreline Sprayground replaced Roller Soaker.

In 2018, there were two new attractions added to The Boardwalk. Breakers Edge Water Coaster and Whitecap Racer. They are right above the lazy river, with Breaker's Edge using the station of the former Roller Soaker attraction. It is considered their biggest splash in nearly a decade.

== Incidents ==
- On July 24th, 2025, a 9-year old guest died after going into distress in the wave pool.
