= The Flying Cobras =

Roller coaster at Carowinds

- Previously known as The Mind Eraser at Geauga Lake/Six Flags Ohio/Six Flags Worlds of Adventure (1996–2003); Head Spin at Geauga Lake (2004–2007); Carolina Cobra at Carowinds (2009–2016)
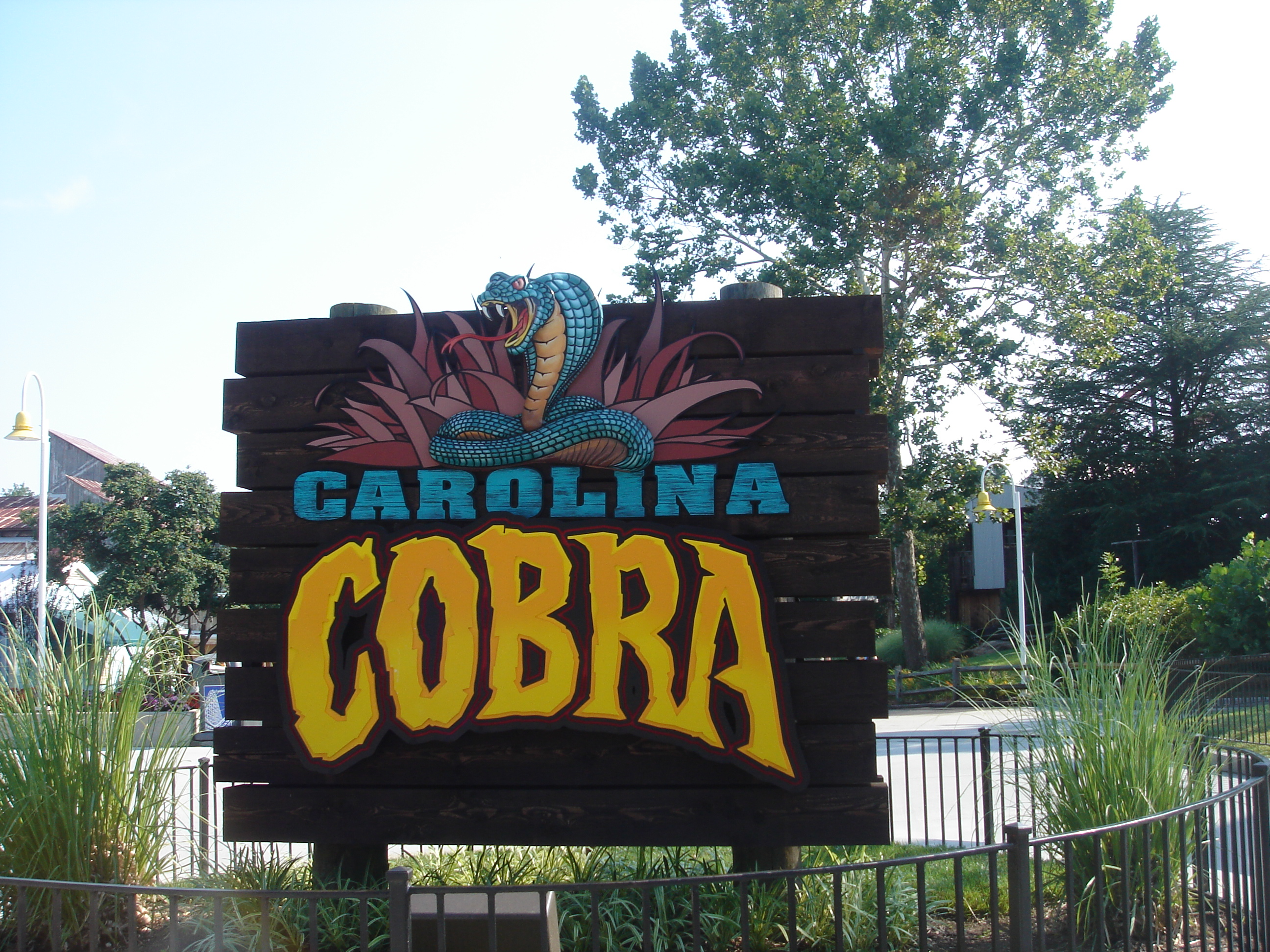

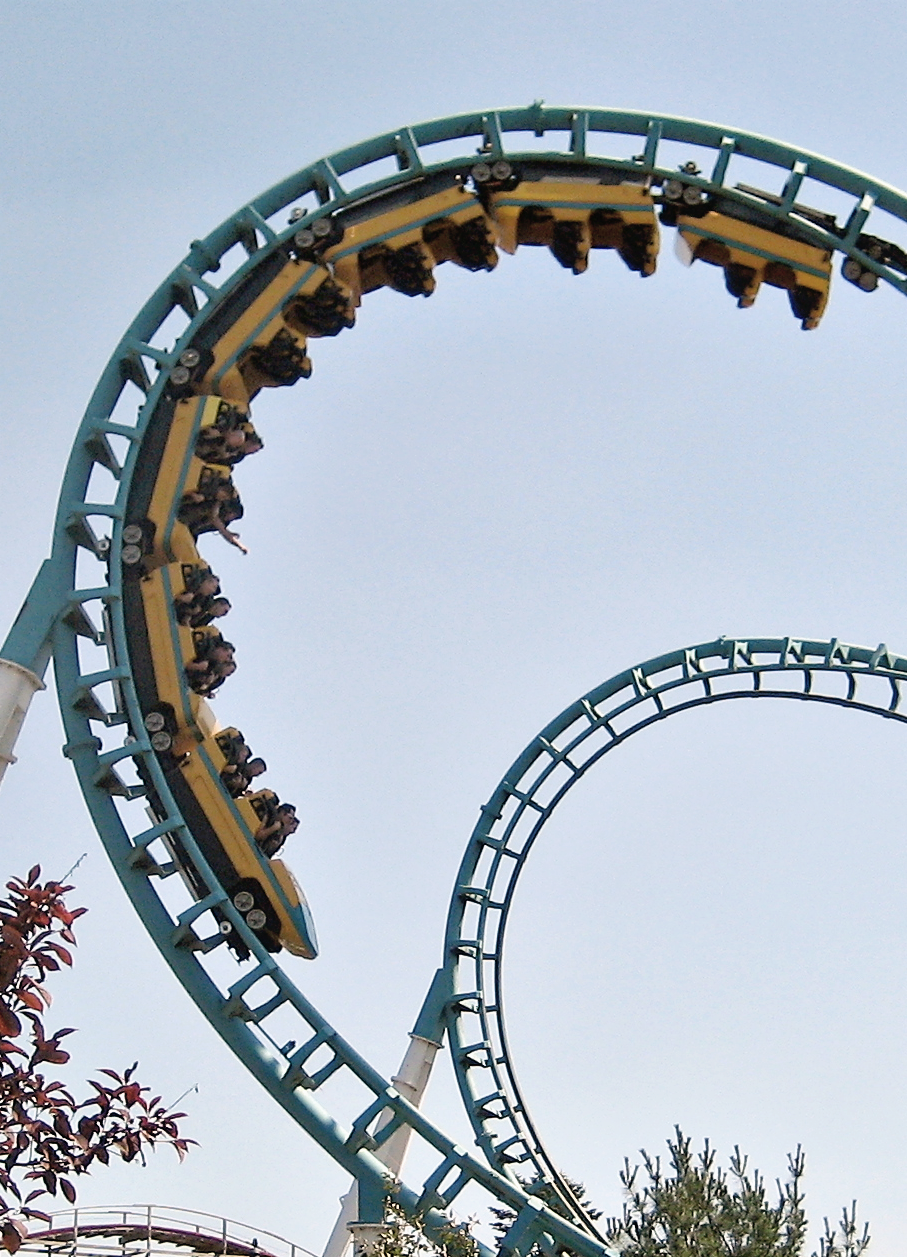
- Top: Former logo at Carowinds. Bottom: The Flying Cobras when it was Head Spin at Geauga Lake

Carowinds
- Park section: County Fair
- Coordinates: 35.102582°N 80.942915°W
- Status: Operating
- Opening date: March 28, 2009
- Replaced: Flying Super Saturator

Geauga Lake
- Coordinates: 41.349632°N 81.378940°W
- Status: Removed
- Opening date: May 10, 1996
- Closing date: September 16, 2007

General statistics
- Type: Steel – Shuttle – Boomerang
- Manufacturer: Vekoma
- Model: Boomerang
- Lift/launch system: Catch car and chain lift hill
- Height: 116.5 ft (35.5 m)
- Drop: 108 ft (33 m)
- Length: 935 ft (285 m)
- Speed: 47 mph (76 km/h)
- Inversions: 3 (each traversed twice)
- Duration: 1:48
- Max vertical angle: 65°
- Capacity: 760 riders per hour
- G-force: 5.2
- Height restriction: 48 in (122 cm)
- Trains: Single train with 7 cars; riders arranged 2 across in 2 rows for a total of 28 riders per train
- Fast Lane available
- The Flying Cobras at RCDB

The Flying Cobras is a steel boomerang roller coaster manufactured by Vekoma. It is located at Carowinds in Charlotte, North Carolina, in the County Fair section of the park. The Flying Cobras was the first roller coaster addition to Carowinds following the park's purchase by Cedar Fair in 2006. It originally debuted in 1996 at Geauga Lake in Ohio as The Mind Eraser, and was later known as Head Spin from 2004 to 2007 after Geauga Lake was purchased by Cedar Fair. After Geauga Lake closed in 2007, the coaster was relocated to Carowinds in 2009 and renamed Carolina Cobra. Following the 2016 season, the roller coaster was refurbished and renamed again in 2017.

== History ==
In early October 1995, Geauga Lake was allowed to build a roller coaster over 125 feet (38 m) with help from Geauga County community. Officials agreed not to enforce an 80-foot (24 m) height limit and the park had dropped two lawsuits.

At the time, the park had just been sold to Premier Parks. Geauga Lake's new owner would spend $9 million on attractions for the 1996 season. Two rides would open that year, with one being a Vekoma Boomerang coaster named The Mind Eraser and the other being an Intamin river rapids ride named Grizzly Run.

The Mind Eraser originally had a turquoise track and white supports. In 2004, Geauga Lake was sold to Cedar Fair and the coaster was renamed to Head Spin.

After Geauga Lake closed in 2007, Head Spin remained standing but was inactive in 2008. Later that year, an announcement stated that Head Spin would be relocated to Carowinds, where it reopened as Carolina Cobra on March 28, 2009. It was built in an area of the park called "County Fair", which was formerly housed by Flying Super Saturator, a roller coaster that was dismantled after the 2008 season.

On August 18, 2016, Carowinds announced the expansion of County Fair for the 2017 season, which included the refurbishment of Carolina Cobra. It was renamed The Flying Cobras to pay tribute to the classic air shows that were once seen at the Carolina County Fair. It also received a new paint scheme with blue track and white supports.

== Ride experience ==
The Flying Cobras is one of over 50 Boomerang coasters installed by Vekoma around the world, but it is the first roller coaster to feature the company's re-designed MK-1212 trains. After dispatching, the train is pulled backwards up the 116.5-foot (35.5 m) lift hill. After that, riders are dropped 108 feet (33 m) down, fly back through the station and into a cobra roll element. The riders then are taken through a 360-degree vertical loop and are sent up a second 116.5-foot (35.5 m) hill. The riders pause, and are sent down to do the full circuit again backwards.

== Incidents ==
On October 18, 2009, Carolina Cobra's second lift hill failed to catch, resulting in a rollback that couldn't make it back through the second set of inversions. The passengers were able to exit the ride onto a nearby platform. All of the passengers were taken to first aid. Seven of the riders were released back into the park; the eighth was taken to a local hospital and examined. No serious injuries were reported.
