= Flying Super Saturator =

Roller coaster

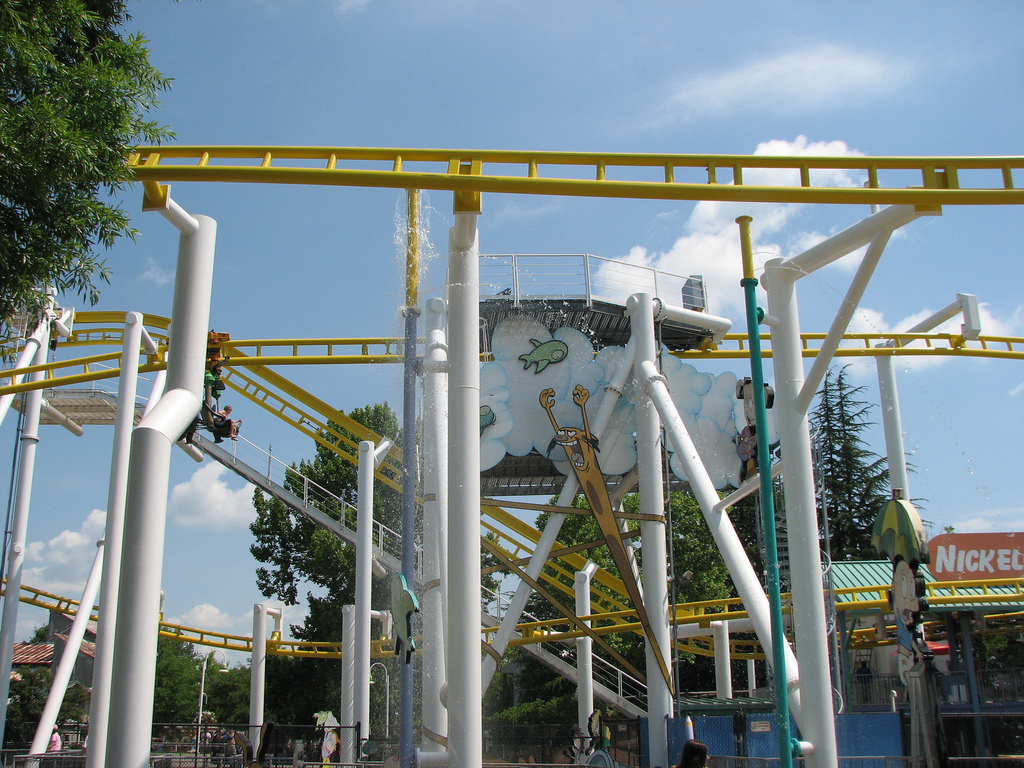

Carowinds
- Location: Carowinds
- Park section: Boomerang Bay
- Coordinates: 35.102710°N 80.943053°W
- Status: Removed
- Opening date: April 1, 2000
- Closing date: August 2008
- Cost: $4,000,000
- Replaced by: The Flying Cobras

General statistics
- Type: Steel – Suspended – Family
- Manufacturer: Setpoint USA
- Lift/launch system: Chain lift hill
- Height: 42.4 ft (12.9 m)
- Length: 1,087 ft (331 m)
- Speed: 30 mph (48 km/h)
- Capacity: 600 riders per hour
- Height restriction: 44 in (112 cm)
- Trains: Several trains with a single car; riders arranged 2 across in 2 rows for a total of 4 riders per train
- Flying Super Saturator at RCDB

Flying Super Saturator was a water ride and suspended roller coaster at Carowinds amusement park, located in Charlotte, North Carolina. It was the first roller coaster of its kind, allowing riders to dump 4-gallon payloads of water on those Carowinds patrons who venture underneath the coaster's track. The ride also features numerous means for the riders to get wet as well, including water curtains, geysers and numerous ground-mounted water cannons that can be aimed by park guests at passing riders on the coaster.

Located in Boomerang Bay, a water park section, the ride was manufactured by Setpoint USA and fabricated by Intermountain Lift, Inc. It was only open during the warmer months of May through September. The roller coaster was removed in 2008 to make room for The Flying Cobras, a relocated Vekoma Boomerang from Geauga Lake.

== Awards and reception ==
Setpoint USA, the company that designed and built Flying Super Saturator, was awarded the World Waterpark Association's industry innovation award for their design and creation of the coaster. Two years after the creation of Flying Super Saturator, Setpoint built a similar water-themed roller coaster called Roller Soaker at Hersheypark in Hershey, Pennsylvania. The two roller coasters were the only suspended water-coasters in the United States; although Roller Soaker was the only one still operating when it closed in 2012.

Flying Super Saturator reached speeds of 30 mph. After the addition of Afterburn in 1999, the addition of Flying Super Saturator began a several-year-long trend of family-friendly rides that were being built at Carowinds. This trend ended in 2004 with the addition of Nighthawk, and signaled a return to more dramatic thrill rides at the park.
