= Coal Cracker =

Log flume ride at Hersheypark

Coordinates: 40.28687°N 76.65360°W

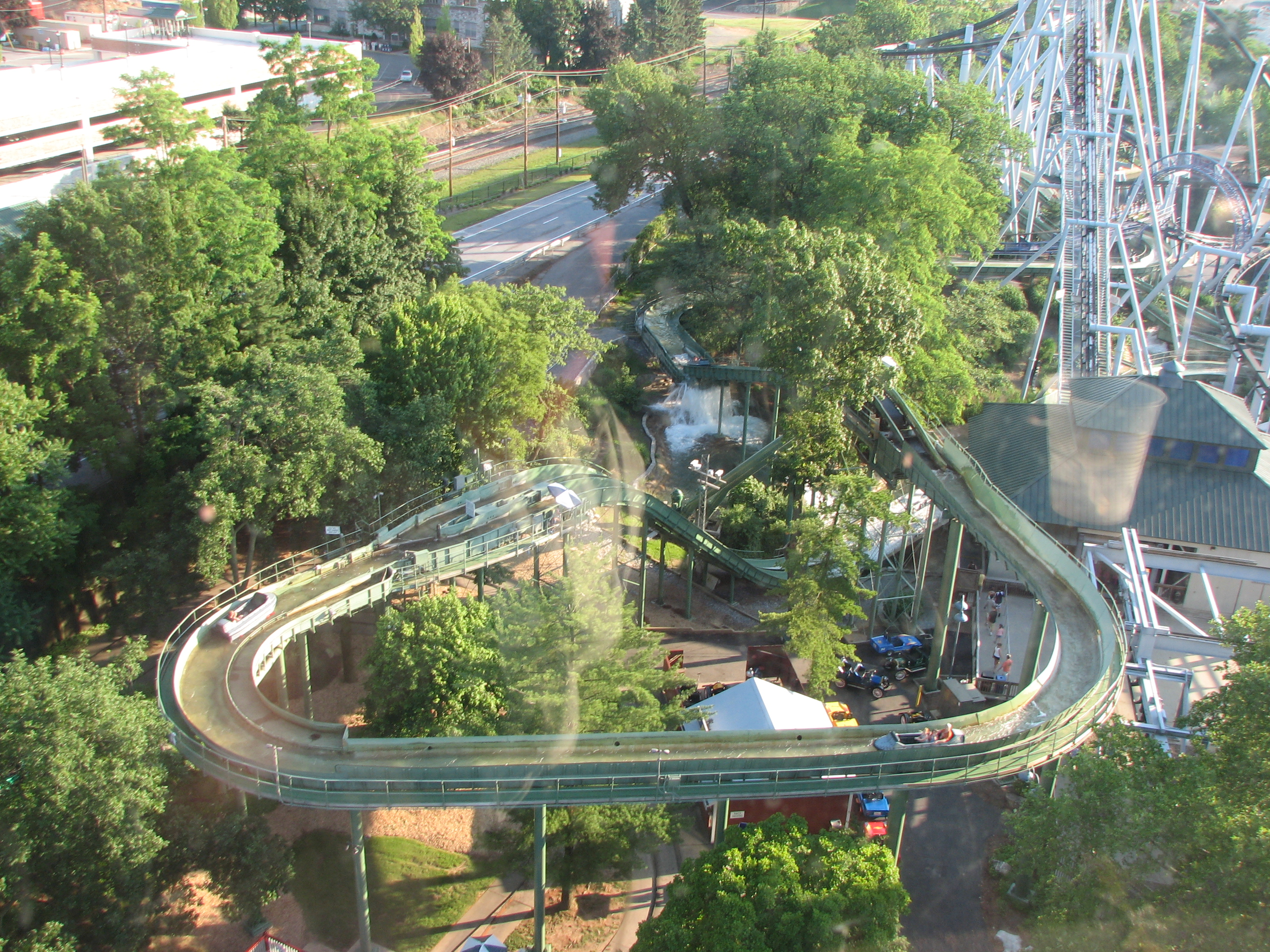

Hersheypark
- Area: Kissing Tower Hill
- Status: Operating
- Opening date: 1973

General statistics
- Type: Log flume
- Manufacturer: Arrow Development
- Height: 55 ft (17 m)
- Drop: 49 ft (15 m)
- Length: 2,000 ft (610 m)
- Max vertical angle: 35°
- Duration: 3:30

Coal Cracker is a classic log flume ride located at Hersheypark in Hershey, Pennsylvania. The ride was installed by Arrow Development in 1973, making it the oldest water ride at Hersheypark still in daily operation. It has a unique layout, due to the terrain features of this part of the park.

Riders are seated in 12-foot (3.7 m) boats for the three and a half minute ride along a water channel over 2,000-foot (610 m) long. Once the fiberglass boat has ascended the first lift hill, riders are only 55 feet (17 m) off the ground. A second lift carries riders above the Twin Turnpike ride, preparing them for the final 35-degree, 49-foot (15 m) drop. Riders' photographs are taken midway through the drop. The Coal Cracker shares space with several newer rides, including the SooperDooperLooper (built in 1977) and the Great Bear (1998).

The water supply for the ride is pumped through pipes connected to a 14,000-square-foot (1,300 m^{2}) man-made lake. This lake has the capacity to store 100,000-US-gallon (380,000 L) of water, and the pump system can handle approximately 25,000-US-gallon (95,000 L) a minute. Guests are loaded into the boats from a revolving turntable; as the boats are always in motion this permits a higher ride capacity while providing more stability during loading and unloading.

Coal Cracker ride photos are produced and sold by Get The Picture Corporation.

Beginning in 2016, the Coal Cracker began operation during Hersheypark in the Dark. The Coal Cracker also begin operating during Springtime in the Park beginning in 2019. The Coal Cracker ride is not in operation during winter events at Hersheypark, such as Christmas Candylane.
