= Coastline Plunge =

Water slides at Hersheypark

Hersheypark
- Area: The Boardwalk at Hersheypark
- Status: Operating
- Opening date: 2007
- Replaced: Chaos

General statistics
- Type: Water Slide complex
- Manufacturer: ProSlide Technology

Coastline Plunge is a water slide complex located at Hersheypark in Hershey, Pennsylvania. It was built by ProSlide Technology, and added to the park in 2007 as part of the then new Boardwalk at Hersheypark expansion. The structure is near the Ferris Wheel in the nearby Midway America section. It consists of six water slides, each with its own experience. Until 2018, these slides were the only standalone water slide attractions in The Boardwalk.

When the complex first opened, there were only four water slides: Riptide, Surge, Vortex, and Whirlwind. Then, during The Boardwalk's 2013 expansion, two more slides were added to the complex: Hydro and Pipeline.

All slides on the complex require their riders to be a Hershey's (48 inches-54 inches) to ride alone. Surge, Riptide, Pipeline, and Hydro allow riders considered a Reese's (42 inches-48 inches) to ride, but must do so with a responsible companion.

== Riptide ==
Riptide is the green slide on the complex. Riders ride in an inflatable tube that holds 1-2 riders. If there are 2 riders, they are seated back-to-back. The tube comes down in snake-like turns and ends in a 3.5 ft splash pool. A portion of the slide intervals between open and enclosed sections and features "water curtains". The minimum height requirement to ride is a Reese's (42 inches). This ride is rated as a "High Thrill Ride".

== Surge ==
Surge is the blue slide and is very similar to Riptide in that it has many of the same features except this one starts at a lower point than Riptide. It also has a splash pool of 3.5 feet, a minimum height requirement of 42 inches, and is considered a High Thrill.

== Vortex ==
Vortex is the orange and blue slide. This slide is shaped like a bowl at the end, often called a "toilet bowl". Riders come down in a single-person tube down an enclosed slide, ending out in the bowl. Riders go around the bowl several times until they get to the middle, where they will go down another short enclosed section that takes them into a 3.5 ft splash pool. Riders of this slide are required to be at least a Hershey's (48 inches). This slide is also a High Thrill.

== Whirlwind ==
Whirlwind is the last original slide on the complex. It is recognized by its yellow and blue color scheme and its giant funnel element at the end. Riders sit in a large green two-person tube that takes them through a short enclosed tunnel. Once the tube exits the tunnel, it is taken up the side of the funnel part, going back and forth along the sides until it comes out the end through a water curtain into a splash pool, which it shares with Surge. Riders of this slide are also required to be no shorter than 48 inches. This is the only slide in the complex that is denoted as an "Aggressive Thrill Ride".

== Hydro ==
Hydro is one of two slides added to Coastline Plunge in 2013. It is an orange slide in which riders ride a one- or two-person tube. Riders travel back-to-back in a similar ride to that of Riptide with open and enclosed sections with water curtains. This slide is a High Thrill. Riders are required to be 42 inches to ride.

== Pipeline ==
Pipeline is the second new slide added to the complex in 2013. It is the yellow slide and is almost identical to Hydro. It also features the same thrill rating and height requirement as Hydro.
