= Breakers Edge Water Coaster =

Ride at Hersheypark

Hersheypark
- Area: The Boardwalk at Hersheypark
- Status: Operating
- Opening date: May 26, 2018

General statistics
- Type: Water coaster
- Manufacturer: ProSlide Technology
- Height: 37 ft (11 m)
- Length: 941.91 ft (287.09 m)
- Duration: 1:18
- Height restriction: 42 in (107 cm)
- Single rider line Not available

Breakers Edge Water Coaster is a water coaster at Hersheypark in Hershey, Pennsylvania. It was built by ProSlide Technology for the 2018 season, making it and Whitecap Racer, the park's other 2018 addition, the first expansion to The Boardwalk at Hersheypark in five years. It is the first Hydro-Magnetic water coaster to feature Flying Saucer turns. It uses the station for the former Roller Soaker ride, which was removed from the park following the 2012 season. Since its removal the area from which guests could spray water at those riding has been converted into a splash pad called Shoreline Sprayground. The original station was left up and was empty since then. Breakers Edge now uses that station. Single riders will be paired with another group. Guests are grouped according to weight, as the ride has a maximum weight limit of 700 pounds.

Due to the location of Breakers Edge and Whitecap Racer, the queue line for the park's lazy river, the Intercoastal Waterway, had to be altered. Additionally, more water sprayers have been added to the Intercoastal Waterway from the bottom of Breakers Edge, which goes over the lazy river.

Guests must be at least 48 inches tall (classifying as a Hershey bar in the park's height categories) to ride. However, guests that are 42 to 48 inches (a Reese's height category) may also ride, but must be accompanied by a responsible companion.
