= Whitecap Racer =

Ride at Hersheypark

Hersheypark
- Area: The Boardwalk at Hersheypark
- Status: Operating
- Opening date: May 26, 2018

General statistics
- Type: Multi-lane racer
- Manufacturer: ProSlide Technology
- Height: 70 ft (21 m)
- Length: 486.39 ft (148.25 m)
- Height restriction: 42 in (107 cm)

Whitecap Racer is a multi-lane mat racing water slide at Hersheypark in Hershey, Pennsylvania. It is one of two new attractions that opened for the 2018 season; the other being Breakers Edge Water Coaster, which is located right next door. These two attractions are the first expansion to The Boardwalk at Hersheypark in five years. It was built by ProSlide Technology.

Whitecap Racer holds the record for the longest mat racer slide in the world. Riders can register for free for a wristband with which they can enter the race and check their time on the leaderboard on the side of Breakers Edge's station. The record times for the day and the season are also viewable on the Hersheypark app.

Due to its location, the queue line for the park's lazy river, the Intercoastal Waterway, had to be altered.

Guests must be at least 42 inches (or a Reese's in Hersheypark's height categories) to ride.
