= SooperDooperLooper =

Looping roller coaster at Hersheypark

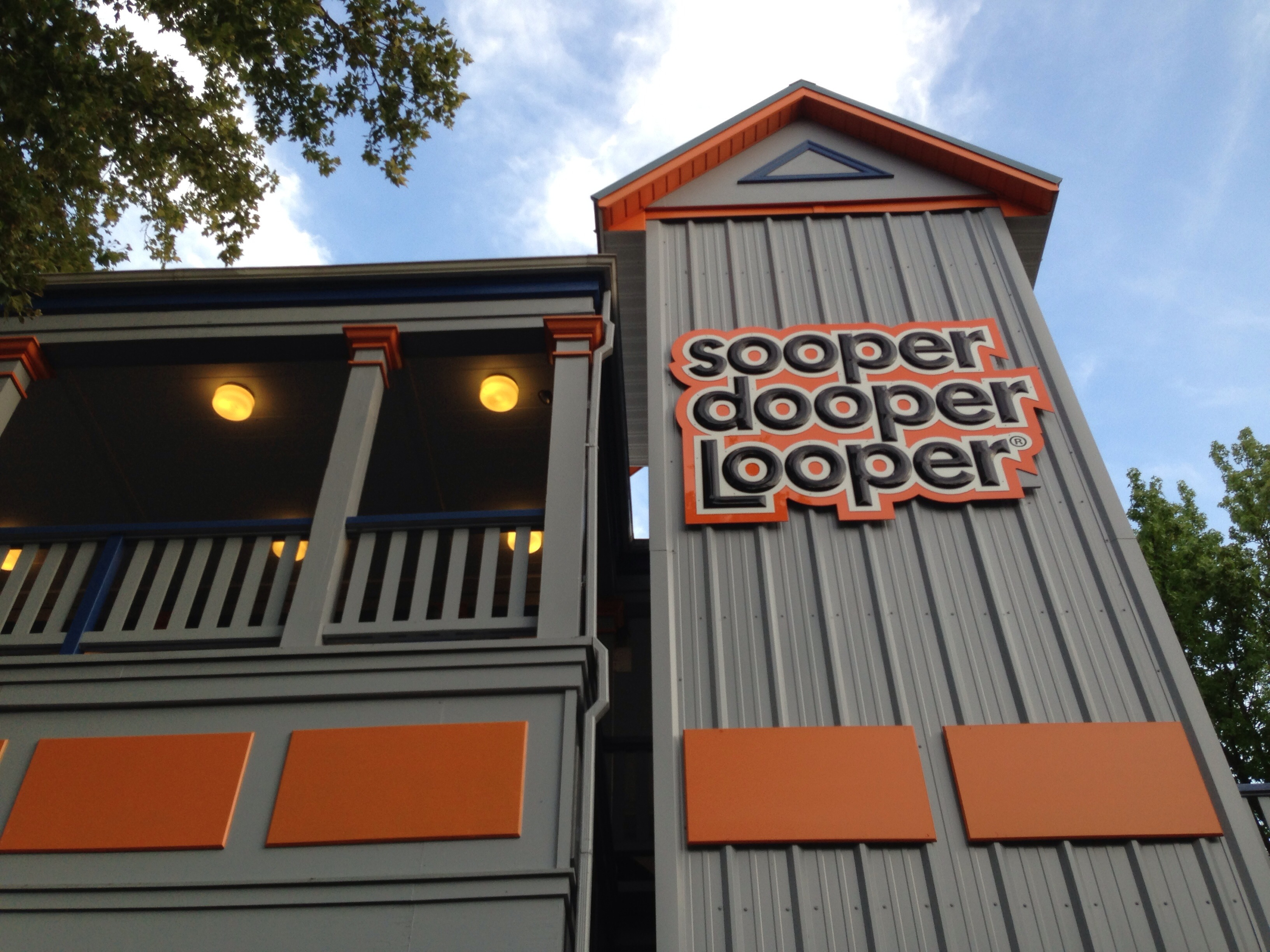
- SooperDooperLooper's station

Hersheypark
- Location: Hersheypark
- Park section: The Hollow
- Coordinates: 40°17′11″N 76°39′13″W
- Status: Operating
- Soft opening date: May 6, 1977
- Opening date: May 8, 1977
- Cost: $3 million
- Replaced: Twin Ferris Wheels; Alpine Flyer

General statistics
- Type: Steel
- Manufacturer: Anton Schwarzkopf
- Model: Looping Racer
- Lift/launch system: Chain lift hill
- Height: 70 ft (21 m)
- Drop: 75 ft (23 m)
- Length: 2,614 ft (797 m)
- Speed: 45 mph (72 km/h)
- Inversions: 1
- Duration: 1:45
- Capacity: 1,175 riders per hour
- Restraint style: Lap bar
- Trains: 2 (formerly 3) trains with 6 cars; riders arranged 2 across in 2 rows for a total of 24 riders per train
- SooperDooperLooper at RCDB

SooperDooperLooper (stylized as sooperdooperLooper) is a steel roller coaster at Hersheypark in Hershey, Pennsylvania, United States. Designed and manufactured by Anton Schwarzkopf, the roller coaster opened to the public on May 8, 1977. SooperDooperLooper is located in The Hollow section of the park and cost more than $3 million to construct and build. The roller coaster reaches a maximum height of 70 feet (21 meters), with a maximum speed of 45 miles per hour (72 km/h), and a total track length of 2,614 feet (797 meters).

The SooperDooperLooper is a Schwarzkopf Looper Racer model, similar to The New Revolution at Six Flags Magic Mountain in Valencia, California. The roller coaster features a 57-foot (17-meter) vertical loop as its signature element. A 150-foot (46-meter) tunnel was added after two seasons of operation. The SooperDooperLooper has seen several variations in color schemes and trains. When the roller coaster opened it received generally positive reviews from critics and guests.

== History ==
Planning for the roller coaster, to be known as the SooperDooperLooper, began in 1975. During the roller coaster's planning stages, Hershey shortlisted a group of names to "merry Derry dip" and "sooperdooperLooper". An executive of Hershey preferred the former "merry Derry dip" as it referenced the Derry Township, the area where Hershey, Pennsylvania, was located. However, the latter was ultimately chosen when the executive was outvoted by his wife and children. The roller coaster was bought in Zürich, Switzerland, in February 1976.

Hersheypark announced its intentions to add a new looping roller coaster for the 1977 season in April 1976. The new roller coaster would include a vertical loop and would be located near the park's amphitheater and log flume. The attraction would be similar to the Great American Revolution at Magic Mountain, an amusement park in Valencia, California. Work began on the project site on October 29, 1976. The name of the roller coaster was presented in December 1976 to the media as the "SooperDooperLooper" along with illustrations. Parts of the roller coaster arrived from its European manufacturer, with foundation work beginning in the early weeks of December. The attraction was said to be the park's "most structurally involved" project to date, at the time.

Construction of the SooperDooperLooper continued into the winter months, causing minor problems when mechanical equipment broke down. Preparation on the roller coaster's vertical loop and station were conducted in February 1977. In the same month, 80 percent of the 8,300,000 pounds (3,800,000 kg) of concrete for the foundation work was complete. The roller coaster's vertical loop was finished in March. Construction on the roller coaster was completed in early May. A preview ceremony for the roller coaster was hosted by the park on May 6, where 250 visitors were in attendance. The SooperDooperLooper was officially opened to the public alongside the park's season on May 8. The park touted the looping roller coaster as the longest to open in the East Coast region. A 150-foot (46-meter) tunnel featuring lights and sounds was added to the roller coaster for the 1979 season.

Hersheypark announced that on September 7, 2026, following Labor Day weekend that they would close SooperDooperLooper, undergoing a major station renovation and upgrades ahead of its 50th anniversary.

== Ride experience ==
The train leaves the station and makes a slight right turn before proceeding up the 28-degree incline lift hill. At the top of the lift hill, the train makes a left turn with a small dip and descends a long 75-foot (23-meter) drop, where the train reaches its maximum speed of 45 miles per hour (72 km/h), then enters the 57-foot (17-meter) vertical loop. Exiting the loop, the train makes a long, ascending sweeping left turn that travels through the middle of the loop. The train traverses a gentle right curve which includes a short tunnel. Out of the tunnel, the track travels along the terrain through various turns. The train goes down a drop then up another hill into a downward spiraling helix, before hitting the final brake run. This is followed by a right turn back to the station. One cycle of the SooperDooperLooper takes around a minute and forty-five seconds to complete.

== Characteristics ==
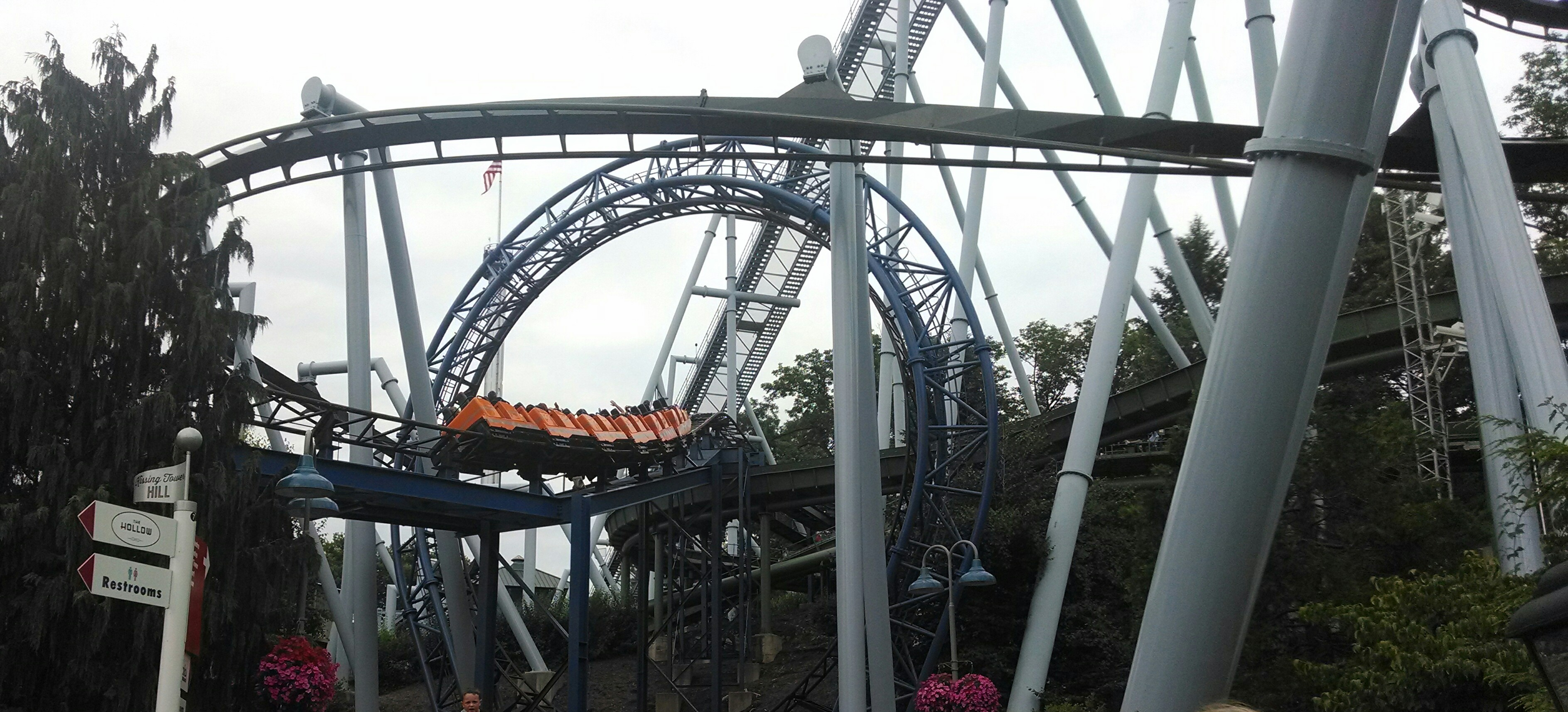
A SooperDooperLooper train going through its loop. The track of the Great Bear inverted roller coaster hangs overhead.

The SooperDooperLooper was designed and manufactured by Anton Schwarzkopf in West Germany. The SooperDooperLooper is a Looping Racer model. Werner Stengel was one of the architects to assist in designing the roller coaster. The design of the roller coaster was also assisted by R. Duell Associates, with General Manufacturer and Equipment Company implementing sensor equipment. Intamin acted on behalf of Schwarzkopf as the business facilitator for the attraction and aided in various roles during its construction.

The roller coaster cost more than $3 million to plan and build. Upon opening, the roller coaster was situated between the Comet wooden roller coaster and Coal Cracker log flume. The SooperDooperLooper is located in "The Hollow" section of the park along with roller coasters Skyrush and the Comet. The roller coaster replaced the site of the former Twin Ferris Wheels (manufactured by Eli Bridge), as well as the Alpine Flyer attraction. The station platform is located on the second-story of its queue building. The station was refurbished during the 2012 season. The roller coaster needed around 500 tons of steel for its construction.

The SooperDooperLooper debuted with white track and orange trains. The roller coaster was repainted in 1989 to feature a black track and blue supports. During the 2021 season, the track retained the black and blue color scheme, with the vertical loop painted white. The roller coaster reaches a maximum height of 70 feet (21 meters). The tunnel section used to contain an animatronic spider that would drop down towards the train and scare riders. The track reaches a total length of 2,614 feet (797 meters) and is considered a terrain roller coaster as it utilizes the landscape in its layout.

Originally, the SooperDooperLooper operated with three trains that sat 24 riders a train, but now runs with only two. The two trains operate with six cars a train, each car arranged two-seats across in two rows allowing for a maximum capacity of twenty four riders a train. Each train features a lap bar restraint. The original Schwarzkopf trains were replaced with trains manufactured by Giovanola in 1989. For the 2012 season, the Giovanola trains were replaced with trains manufactured by Gerstlauer, with an orange color scheme. The control system was also updated with magnetic brakes. One Giovanola train was donated to the National Roller Coaster Museum and Archives.

== Incidents and accidents ==
A 16-year-old worker from Lebanon, Pennsylvania, died after being hit by a moving train in the station's loading area while performing maintenance on August 25, 1977. A second maintenance worker was reportedly slightly injured in the accident. The roller coaster remained closed during an investigation of the accident, and would reopen on September 1, with the park claiming the 16-year-old's actions caused the train to set in motion. An initial investigation by the Occupational Safety and Health Administration (OSHA) differed from the park's investigation. The park would later reverse course, stating the accident victim was not at fault and placed fault with the media for the divergence of facts regarding the accident. OSHA fined Hersheypark the maximum penalty of $2,000 in September for two violations in safety protocol regarding the possibility of hazards. The family of the 16-year-old later sued Schwarzkopf and Intamin for damages.

A 22-year-old park visitor was seriously injured after falling from the roller coaster while riding on May 1, 1988. The roller coaster was closed pending investigations from the park and Pennsylvania's Bureau of Amusement Rides and Attractions. Mechanical fault was ruled out, with preliminary reports stating the visitor had stood up while the roller coaster was in motion. State investigators cleared the park of wrongdoing on May 6, faulting the rider for their conduct in opening their lap bar restraint. The roller coaster reopened the next day, May 7.

== Reception and legacy ==
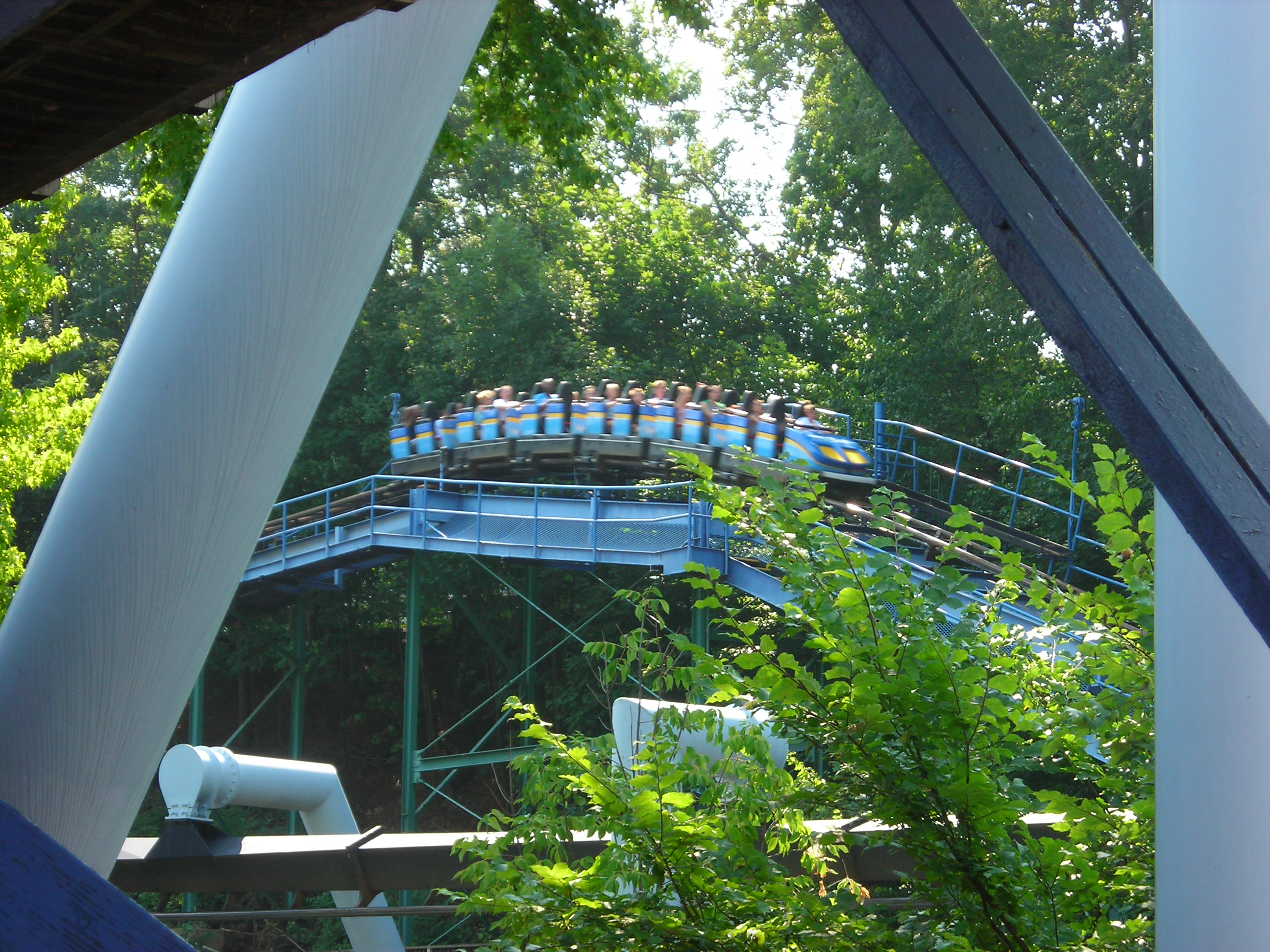
A SooperDooperLooper train as it crests a hill

Upon opening, the SooperDooperLooper received generally positive reviews from critics and guests. Dean R. Wise, a reporter for the York Daily Record, recorded guests’ reactions to the roller coaster, with most riders exclaiming various praise. Wise personally commented that the roller coaster was quick, and ended his commentary stating it was "positively insane". Charles Shaw, a staff member for the Intelligencer Journal, highlighted the steep incline of the lift hill as well as the excitement of the vertical loop, calling it "rather fun" after fully grasping the experience. Shaw further described the remainder of the ride as "a little anti-climatic" as it contained elements seen on other roller coasters. Sue Smith, an editor for Lancaster New Era, commented that though she had her eyes closed during the ride, the sensation of the roller coaster was "a little scary and a lot thrilling", emphasizing the vertical loop. Lorrie Brown, a reporter for the Public Opinion, remarked that though the physical appearance of the loop was smaller than first anticipated, she concluded "the sooperdooperLooper delivers". Brown additionally stated the roller coaster produced "a whirlwind of motion", and was similarly scared by the end helix as with the vertical loop.

Attendance at Hersheypark increased from 1.4 million to 1.7 million visitors during the 1977 season, ranking among the top three United States amusement parks. The increase in visitors was partially attributed to the opening of the SooperDooperLooper. The SooperDooperLooper was the first inverting roller coaster at the park. After five years of operation, over 200,000 t-shirts with the slogan "I survived the sooperdooperLooper" were sold, prompting the park to celebrate the roller coaster with a t-shirt day for the end of the 1981 season.
