= 2015 in amusement parks =

This is a list of events and openings related to amusement parks that occurred in 2015. These various lists are not exhaustive.

== Amusement parks ==
=== Opening ===
- Vietnam Asia Park
- Morocco Parc Sindibad
- USA HuckFinn PlayLand

=== Birthday ===
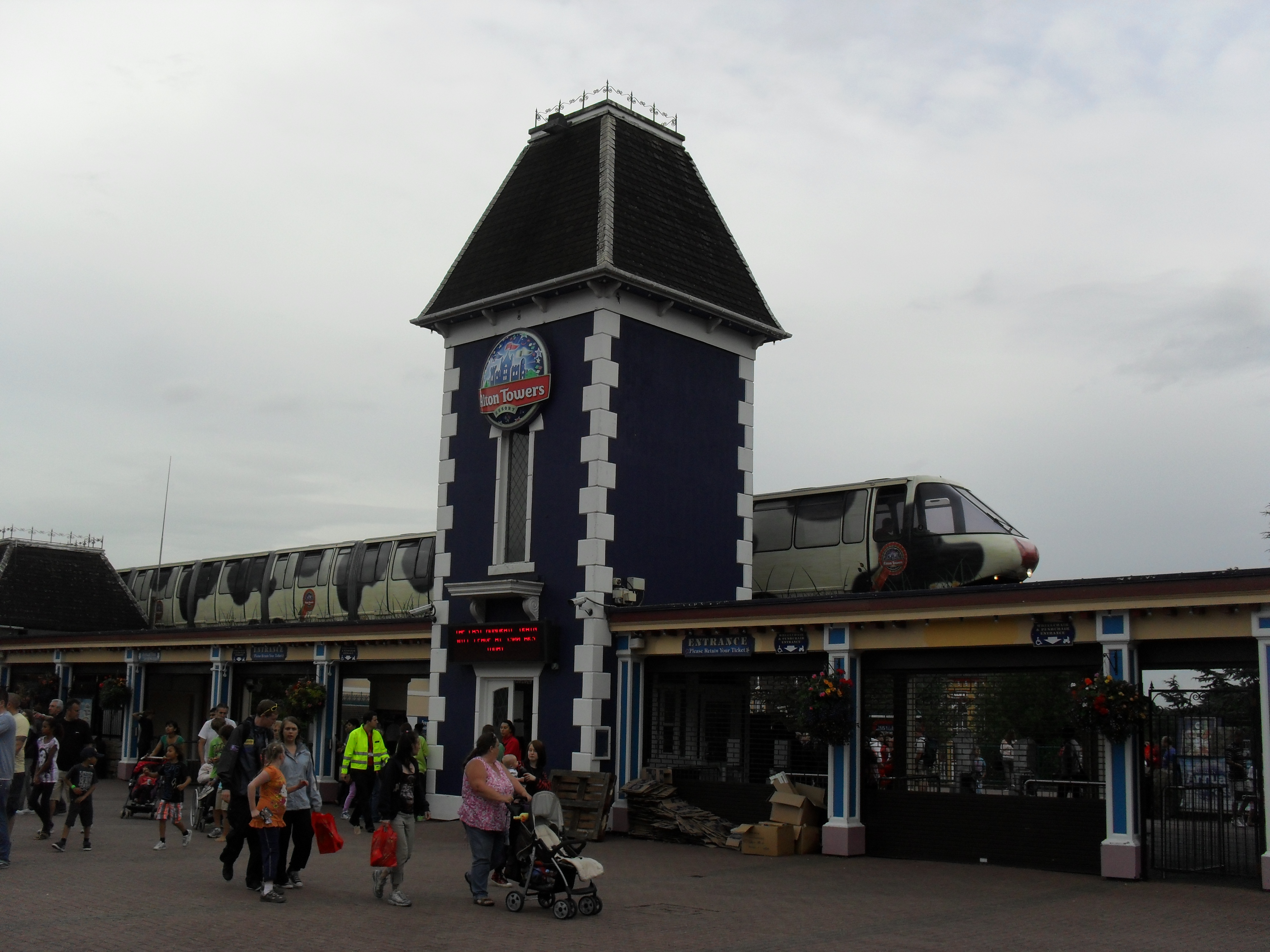
The Alton Towers Resort celebrated its 35th anniversary in April.

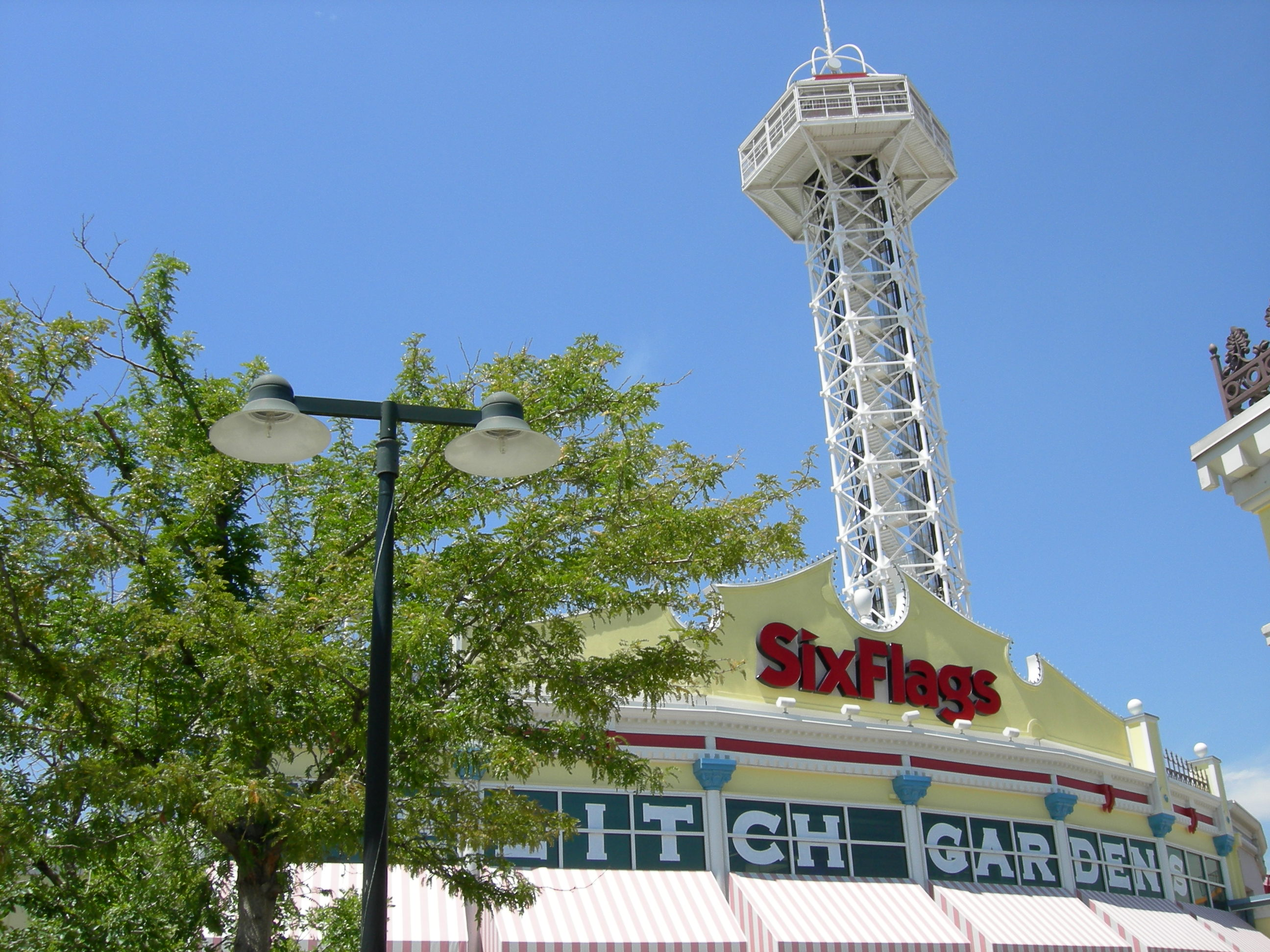
Elitch Gardens celebrated its 125th anniversary.

- Australia Luna Park Sydney – 80th birthday
- England Alton Towers Resort – 35th birthday
- England Drayton Manor Theme Park – 65th birthday
- Germany Europa Park – 40th birthday
- Hong Kong, China Hong Kong Disneyland – 10th birthday
- Italy Gardaland Resort – 40th birthday
- Philippines Enchanted Kingdom – 20th birthday
- USA Disneyland – 60th birthday
- USA Universal Orlando – 25th birthday
- USA Universal Studios Hollywood – 50th birthday
- USA Six Flags New England – 145th birthday
- USA Sesame Place – 35th birthday
- USA Elitch Gardens – 125th birthday
- USA Kings Dominion – 40th birthday
- USA Knott's Berry Farm – 75th birthday

=== Closed ===
- Finland Wasalandia – 2015
- Israel Kings City - June
- USA Boomers! Dania Beach – January 25
- USA Miracle Strip at Pier Park – September 21

== Additions ==
=== Roller coasters ===
==== New ====
Name	Park	Type	Manufacturer	Opened	Ref(s)
Acrobat	Nagashima Spa Land	Flying Coaster	Bolliger & Mabillard	2015	
Baron 1898	Efteling	Dive Coaster	Bolliger & Mabillard	July 1	
Batman: The Ride	Six Flags Fiesta Texas	4th dimension roller coaster	S&S Worldwide	May 25	
Cannibal	Lagoon	Steel roller coaster	Lagoon Amusement Park	July 2	
Cú Chulainn	Tayto Park	Wooden roller coaster	The Gravity Group	June 6	
Dragon Roller Coaster	Energylandia	Suspended Family Coaster	Vekoma	June 4	
Dragon Legend	Romon U-Park	Launched roller coaster	Maurer Sohne	December 2015	
Energuś Roller Coaster	Energylandia	Junior roller coaster	Vekoma	May 2015	
Euro Express	Romon U-Park	Steel roller coaster	Intamin	2015	
Fury 325	Carowinds	Giga Coaster	Bolliger & Mabillard	March 28	
Harpy	Xishuangbanna Theme Park	Flying Coaster	Bolliger & Mabillard	2015	
Impulse	Knoebels	Tower coaster	Zierer	April 25	
Jungle Trailblazer	Oriental Heritage, Wuhu	Wooden roller coaster	Martin & Vleminckx	2015	
Jungle Trailblazer	Fantawild Dreamland, Zhengzhou	Wooden roller coaster	Martin & Vleminckx	2015	
Jungle Trailblazer	Oriental Heritage, Jinan	Wooden roller coaster	The Gravity Group	2015	
Junker	PowerLand	Infinity Coaster	Gerstlauer	2015	
Schwur des Kärnan	Hansa Park	Hypercoaster	Gerstlauer	2015	
Laff Trakk	Hersheypark	Indoor Spinning roller coaster	Maurer Söhne	May 23	
Live Oak Lady Bug	New Orleans City Park	Steel roller coaster	Zierer	February 28	
Maskerade	Wiener Prater	Spinning roller coaster	Gerstlauer	May 1	
Oblivion: The Black Hole	Gardaland	Dive Coaster	Bolliger & Mabillard	March 28	
Octonauts Rollercoaster Adventure	Alton Towers	Steel roller coaster	Zamperla	March 21	
Puss in Boots' Giant Journey	Universal Studios Singapore	Suspended Family Roller Coaster	Zamperla	April 8	
Rewind Racers	Adventure City	Steel roller coaster	Gerstlauer	2015	
Roller Coaster Mayan	Energylandia	Suspended Looping Coaster	Vekoma	September 12	
Serpent	Parc Sindibad	Euro-Fighter roller coaster	Gerstlauer	2015	
SpongeBob's Boating School Blast	Sea World	Junior roller coaster	Zamperla	September 25	
Switchback	ZDT'S Amusement Park	Wooden roller coaster	Gravitykraft Corporation	2015	
Tempesto	Busch Gardens Williamsburg	Launched roller coaster	Premier Rides	April 25	
Thunderbird	Holiday World & Splashin' Safari	Wing Coaster	Bolliger & Mabillard	April 25	
Troublesome Trucks Runaway Coaster	Edaville USA	Junior roller coaster	Zamperla	August 15	
Turbulence	Adventureland (New York)	Spinning roller coaster	Mack Rides	May 22	

==== Relocated ====
Name	Park	Type	Manufacturer	Opened	Formerly	Ref(s)
Port of Sky Treasure	Asia Park	Mine train roller coaster	Vekoma	2015	Iron Horse at Freestyle Music Park	
Garuda Valley	Asia Park	Junior roller coaster	Vekoma	2015	Hang Ten at Freestyle Music Park	
Wild West Express	Adventure Park USA	Steel roller coaster	Zamperla	2015	Windstorm at Old Town	
Tren Minero	Fantasilandia	Mine train roller coaster	Vekoma	2015	Diamond Devil Run at Ratanga Junction	
Lil Dipper Roller Coaster	Sluggers & Putters	Junior roller coaster	Allan Herschell Company	2015	Little Dipper at LeSourdsville Lake Amusement Park	
Hurricane	Race City PCB	Steel roller coaster	S.D.C.	2015	Hurricane at Adventureland	
Freestyle	Cavallino Matto	Stand-up roller coaster	TOGO	2015	SkyRider at Canada's Wonderland	

==== Refurbished ====
Name	Park	Type	Manufacturer	Opened	Formerly	Ref(s)
Battlestar Galactica	Universal Studios Singapore	Duelling roller coaster	Vekoma	May 27	—N/a	
Hot Wheels SideWinder	Dreamworld	Steel roller coaster	Arrow Dynamics	December 2015	Cyclone	
Rampage	Alabama Splash Adventure	Wooden roller coaster	Custom Coasters International	2015	—N/a	
Rougarou	Cedar Point	Floorless Coaster	Bolliger & Mabillard	May 9	Mantis	
Space Mountain: Mission 2	Disneyland Paris	Steel roller coaster	Vekoma	July 24	—N/a	
T3	Kentucky Kingdom	Suspended Looping Coaster	Vekoma	May 30	T2	
Twisted Colossus	Six Flags Magic Mountain	Steel roller coaster	Rocky Mountain Construction	May 23	Colossus	
Wicked Cyclone	Six Flags New England	Steel roller coaster	Rocky Mountain Construction	May 25	Cyclone	

=== Other attractions ===
==== New ====
Name	Park	Type	Opened	Ref(s)
Brain Drain	Frontier City	22M Giant Loop	2015	
Bourbon Street Fireball	Six Flags America	22M Giant Loop	May 25	
Bubble Guppies Guppy Bubbler	Nickelodeon Universe	Spinning Tower Ride	July 4	
Dare Devil: Chaos Coaster	Six Flags Discovery Kingdom	22M Giant Loop	May 23	
Disneyland Forever	Disneyland	Fireworks show	May 22	
Dive Bomber	Six Flags White Water	Water slide complex	May 23	
El Diablo	Six Flags Great Adventure	22M Giant Loop	May 16	
Fast and Furious: Supercharged	Universal Studios Hollywood	Part of the Studio Tour	June 25	
Fireman's Landing	Silver Dollar City	Interactive Areas & Rides	March 14	
Justice League: Battle for Metropolis	Six Flags Over Texas	Dark ride	May 23	
Justice League: Battle for Metropolis	Six Flags St. Louis	Dark ride	June 5	
L'era Glaciale 4D - Una Ghianda è Per Sempre	Gardaland	4D Show	June 21	
Ice Age 4D - No Time For Nuts	Alton Towers	4D Show	May 21	
Maison Rouge: Labyrinth of Terror	La Ronde	Haunted maze	October 1	
Orlando Eye	International Drive	Ferris wheel	May 4	
Paint the Night Electrical Parade	Disneyland	Parade	May 22	
Red Arrows Sky Force	Blackpool Pleasure Beach	Gerstlauer Sky Fly	May 25	
Prezzemolo Magic Village	Gardaland	Playground	March 27	
Sling Shot	Canada's Wonderland	Reverse bungee	2015	
Sling Shot	Carowinds	Reverse bungee	2015	
Snoopy's Space Buggies	Kings Island	Jump Around Ride	April 18	
Springfield	Universal Studios Hollywood	Themed area	May 12	
The Joker Chaos Coaster	Six Flags Over Georgia	22M Giant Loop	May 23	
Voyage to the Iron Reef	Knott's Berry Farm	Dark ride	May 15	
Wave Pool	Waldameer & Water World	Aquatic Development Group wave pool	May 29	
Woodstock Gliders	Kings Island	Larson Flying Scooters	April 18	

== Closed attractions & roller coasters ==
Name	Park	Type	Closed	Ref(s)
A-Maze-ing Adventure	Canada's Wonderland	Children's Maze	October 31	
Balloon Race	Nickelodeon Universe	Balloon Chase	April 20	
Captain EO	Epcot	Show	December 7	
Danny Phantom Ghost Zone	Nickelodeon Universe	Falling Star	July 11	
Disaster!: A Major Motion Picture Ride...Starring You!	Universal Studios Florida	Dark ride	September 8	
Gwazi	Busch Gardens Tampa Bay	Wooden Dueling roller coaster	February 1	
Great Barrier Reef	Carolina Harbor	Wave_pool	2015	
Hang Time	Dorney Park & Wildwater Kingdom	Top Spin	Unknown	
Hurler	Kings Dominion	Wooden roller coaster	November 1	
Innoventions	Disneyland	Interactive exhibits	March 31	
Luigi's Flying Tires	Disney California Adventure	Bumper cars	February 17	
Revolution	Six Flags Magic Mountain	Steel roller coaster	September 7	
Ripsaw	Alton Towers	Top Spin	November 8	
Roar	Six Flags Discovery Kingdom	Wooden roller coaster	August 16	
Shake, Rattle, and Roll	Elitch Gardens	Top Spin	Unknown	
Shockwave	Kings Dominion	Stand-up roller coaster	August 9	
Shoot the Rapids	Cedar Point	Log Flume	September 7	
Special Effects Stage	Universal Studios Hollywood	Special effects show	October 18	
The Blues Brothers R&B Revue	Universal Studios Hollywood	Live show	February 16	
The Flume	Alton Towers	Log Flume	October 10	
The Golden Mickeys	Hong Kong Disneyland	Live show	July 26	
The Magic of Disney Animation	Disney's Hollywood Studios	Tour	July 12	
The NBCUniversal Experience	Universal Studios Hollywood	Exhibits	September 1	
The Sorcerer's Hat	Disney's Hollywood Studios	Park icon	January 7	
Thunder Road	Carowinds	Wooden Dueling roller coaster	July 26	
Top Spin	Gardaland	Top Spin	January 6	
Twister...Ride it Out	Universal Studios Florida	Simulation Ride	November 2	

== Themed Accommodation ==
=== New ===
Name	Park	Theme	Opening	ref(s)
Enchanted Village	Alton Towers Resort	Enchanted Woodland	April 18	
