= King City =

King City may refer to:

== Places ==
=== United States ===
- King City, California, a city
- King City Township, McPherson County, Kansas, a civil township
- King City, Missouri, a city
- King City, Oregon, a city

=== Canada ===
- King City, Ontario, an unincorporated community
  - King City GO Station, a train and bus station

== Arts and entertainment ==
- "King City" (song), the debut single of the band Swim Deep
- "King City", a song from Andre Nickatina 2005 album The Gift
- "King City", a 2016 song by Majid Jordan on the album Majid Jordan
- King City (comic), a comic by Brandon Graham
- King City, a fictional location in the Eight Worlds novels

== Schools ==
- King City Secondary School, Ontario, Canada
- King City High School, California, United States

== Other uses ==
- King City, a British collier sunk in the Indian Ocean by the German auxiliary cruiser Atlantis in August 1940

== See also ==
- Kings City, an Israeli theme park
- King's City, a historical nickname for a number of cities, including Alghero, Drohobych, and Rokycany
- Queen City (disambiguation)
