= Batman: The Ride (S&S Free Spin) =

Roller coaster at two Six Flags parks

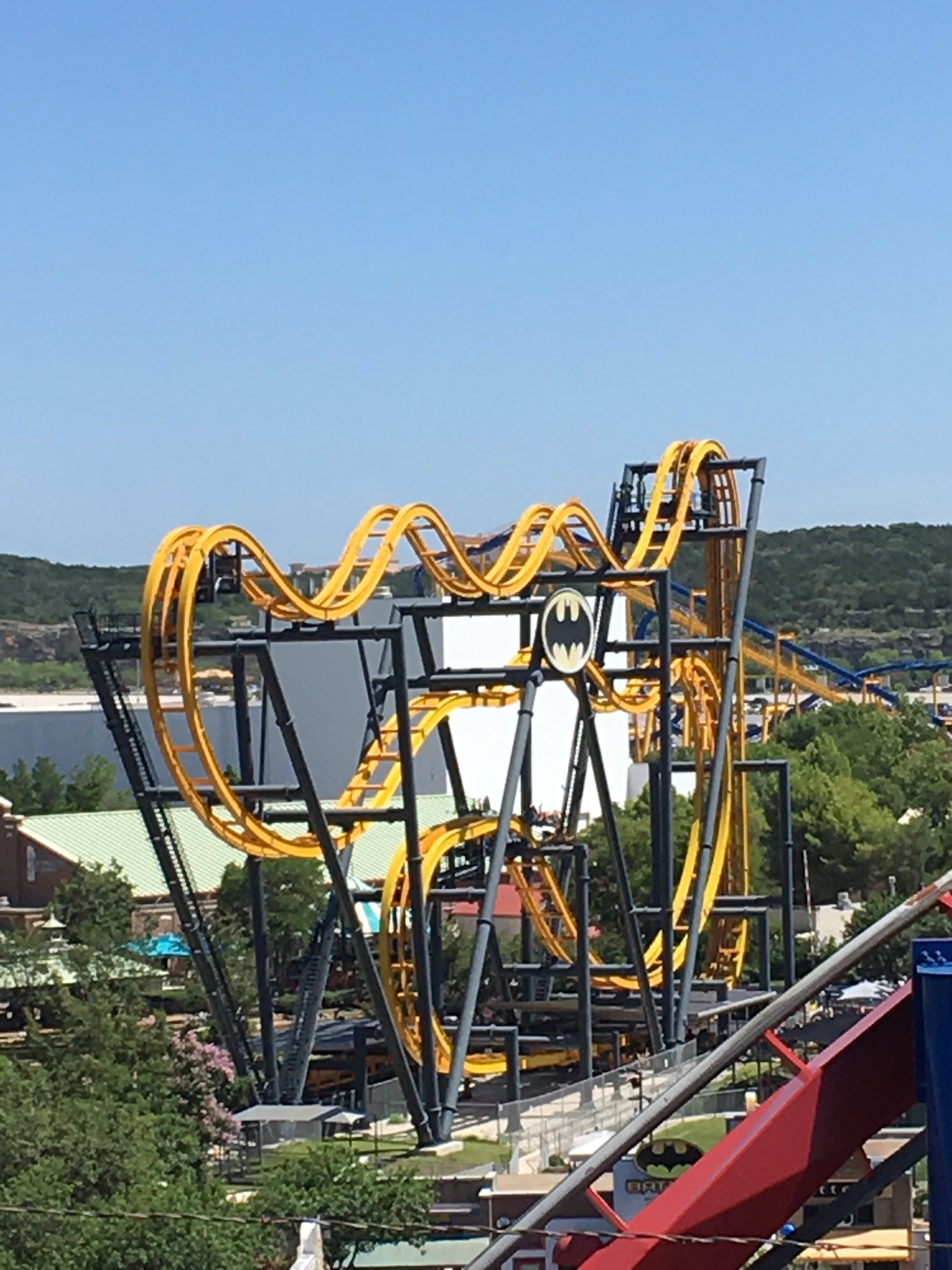
- Batman: The Ride at Fiesta Texas

General statistics
- Type: Steel – 4th Dimension – Wing Coaster
- Manufacturer: S&S – Sansei Technologies
- Designer: Alan Schilke
- Model: 4D Free Spin
- Lift/launch system: Chain lift hill
- Height: 120 ft (37 m)
- Drop: 54 ft (16 m)
- Length: 1,019 ft (311 m)
- Speed: 38 mph (61 km/h)
- Inversions: 6 (2 track inversions)
- Capacity: 720 riders per hour
- Height restriction: 48–77 in (122–196 cm)
- Trains: 5 trains with a single car. Riders are arranged 4 across in 2 rows for a total of 8 riders per train.
- Fast Lane available

Batman: The Ride is a 4D Free Spin roller coaster at two Six Flags parks in North America since 2015. The coasters were designed by S&S - Sansei Technologies, along with Alan Schilke, with the track manufactured by Rocky Mountain Construction.

As the name suggests, Batman: The Ride is themed to the DC Comics superhero, Batman.

== History ==
After months of a teaser campaign for a 2015 attraction, Batman: The Ride was officially announced for Six Flags Fiesta Texas on August 28, 2014. The roller coaster replaced Motorama Turnpike, an original car ride that opened with the park in 1992. Track for Batman: The Ride arrived in February 2015 with the construction of the site well underway for the installation. The roller coaster was completed near the end of March of the same year before opening on May 23, 2015.

Three years later, Six Flags announced another similar coaster with the same theme at Six Flags Discovery Kingdom on August 30, 2018. Batman: The Ride at Six Flags Discovery Kingdom, later opened on May 25, 2019.

== Ride ==
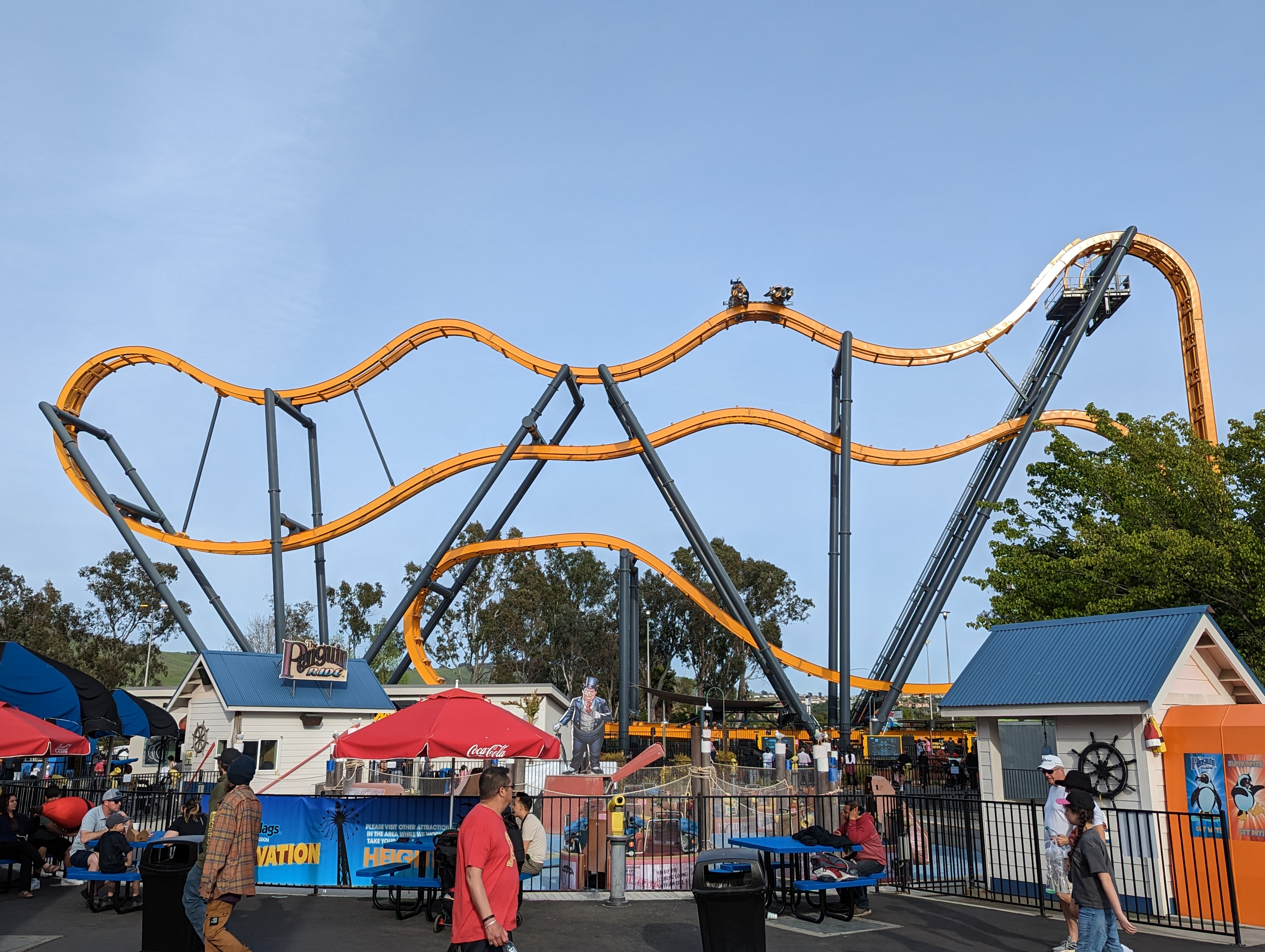
The Discovery Kingdom location.

The Ride begins by climbing up a 120-foot vertical rise. Then zooms over hills while pivoting forward multiple times, before plummeting into a steep raven drop. Next, riders subsequently change directions and get to enjoy a backwards flip, spinning backwards into another raven drop and then ending with a forward flip. The roller coaster uses an adjustable series of magnetic kickers to allow the cars to spin freely, based on factors such as gravity and rider weight in the cars. The park can adjust the degree of spin based on rider input, which will help them regulate the experience to average rider tolerance over time.

== Installations ==
Locations for Batman: The Ride
Park	Area	Opening date	Refs
Six Flags Fiesta Texas	Rockville	May 23, 2015	
Six Flags Discovery Kingdom	DC Universe	May 25, 2019	

== Reception ==
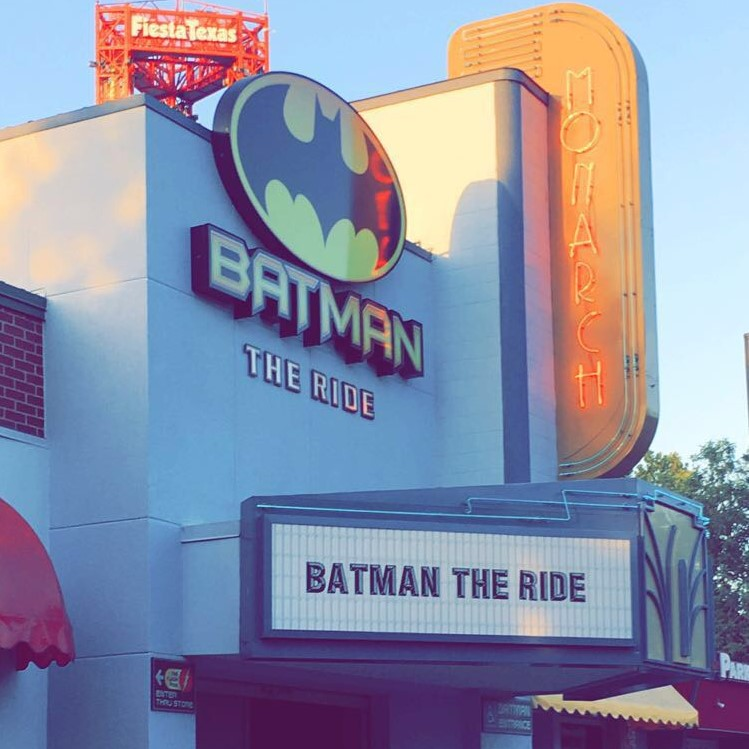
Batman: The Ride's entrance at Six Flags Fiesta Texas

Batman: The Ride became one of the most anticipated roller coasters of 2015 due to the ride being the first of its kind in the world. With some stating that the roller coaster may become the "most intense" ever built. The coaster has generally been well received by the media and park goers. Tim Baldwin of RollerCoaster! Magazine who gave the ride more than a few "Bat-whirls" stated that "you really don’t know what to expect" and "it is just like summersaulting through the sky". Albert Salazar from San Antonio Current, didn't know what to expect as the roller coaster didn't look like any other roller coaster at the theme park as Batman offers a "unique topsy-turvy experience." After he and his co-workers disembarked the ride in surprise they were all in shock, with one stating "What the hell just happened?" They then, "wondered when we could get on it again."

With the success of Batman: The Ride and becoming "an immediate fan favorite", Six Flags has spawned another version of the ride the following year at Six Flags Great Adventure as The Joker. The company has built five more similar rides throughout North America including the coaster at Six Flags Discovery Kingdom.

After Batman: The Ride's debut year in 2015, the roller coaster didn't receive any votes of the Amusement Today's Golden Ticket Awards for best new ride or any for the coaster to be a part of the top fifty steel roller coasters in the world of that year.
