= Laff Trakk =

Roller coaster at Hersheypark

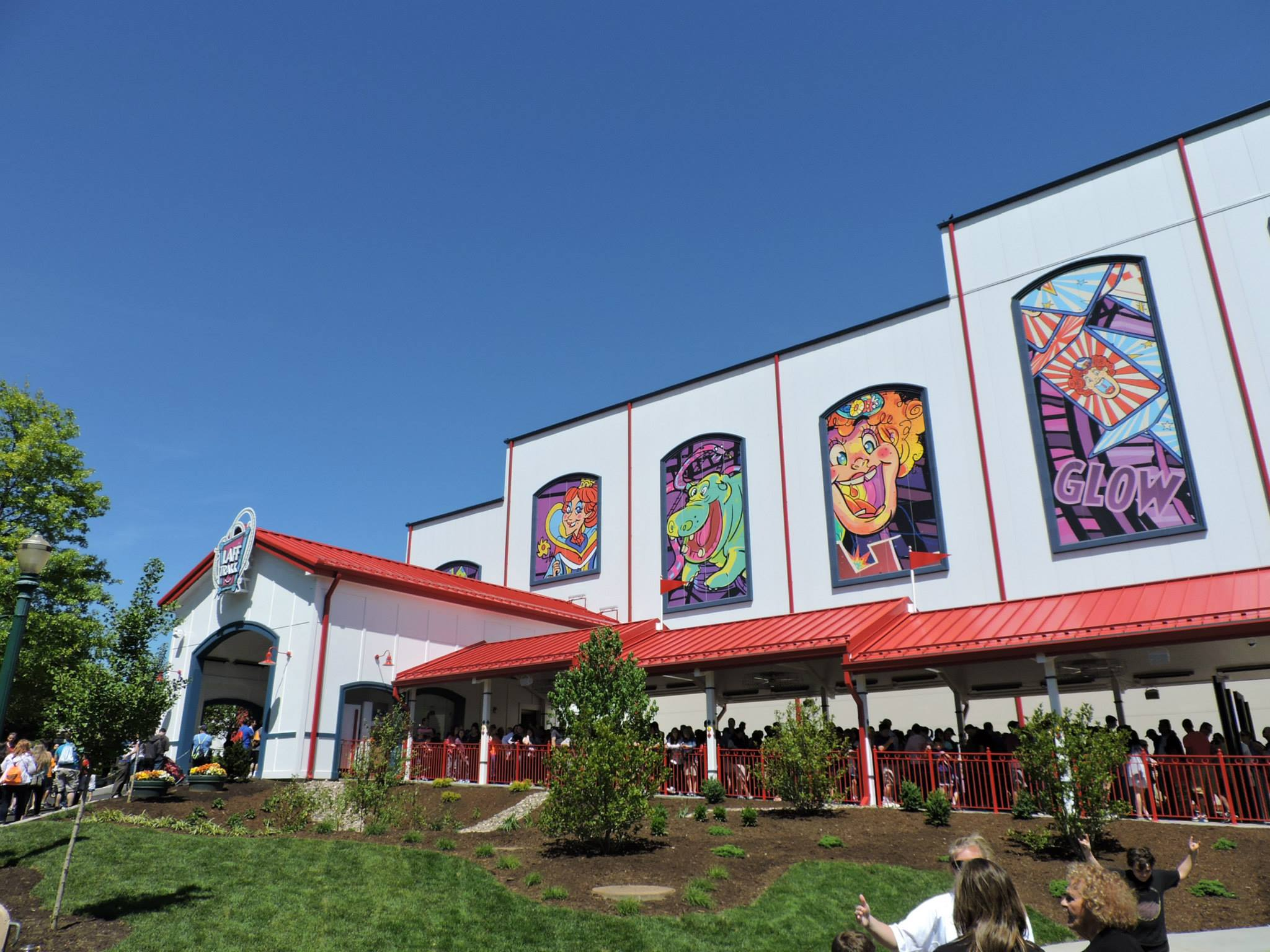
- Entrance and queue line of Laff Trakk.

Hersheypark
- Location: Hersheypark
- Park section: Midway America
- Coordinates: 40.29354°N 76.65512°W
- Status: Operating
- Opening date: May 23, 2015
- Cost: $14,000,000

General statistics
- Type: Steel – Spinning
- Manufacturer: Maurer AG
- Track layout: Indoor-Spinning Glow
- Lift/launch system: Chain
- Height: 51 ft (16 m)
- Length: 1,400 ft (430 m)
- Speed: 40 mph (64 km/h)
- Inversions: 0
- Duration: 1:10
- Capacity: 850 riders per hour
- Height restriction: 42–76 in (107–193 cm)
- Trains: 7 trains with a single car; riders arranged 2 across in 2 rows for a total of 4 riders per train
- Laff Trakk at RCDB

Laff Trakk is an indoor spinning steel roller coaster at Hersheypark in Hershey, Pennsylvania. The roller coaster was designed by Maurer AG while the indoor theming was designed by Raven Sun Creative. Laff Trakk is Hersheypark's 12th oldest operating roller coaster and is located in the Midway America section of the park, adjacent to the Merry-Derry-Dip attraction. The site of the coaster is on the former location of Granny Bugs, Miniature Train, and Pony Parade, three kinds of kiddie rides. The coaster is considered a "glow coaster" because of the interior theming of the ride which appears to glow in the dark. The ride track is black-blue as is its support, with the ride vehicles being violet. The theming also recalls past funhouses that were in Hersheypark between 1930 and 1972. Laff Trakk opened to the general public on May 23, 2015.

== History ==
On July 15, 2014, the first hint of Hersheypark's 2015 attraction was released. Each clue would consist of a riddle, relating to the theme of the attraction. The clues were released every Tuesday for four weeks until Laff Trakk was officially announced on August 12, 2014. with the official name announced, an animated on-ride POV, photo-ops referencing the ride theme, and meet-and-greet characters seen in the clues including a fortune teller and Laffing Sal. The ride reaches an approximate height of 50 ft (15 m) and consists of 1,400 ft (430 m) of track. The ride vehicle consists of four seats, back-to-back, that will begin to freely-spin 360° during the ride. The spinning of the ride vehicle depends on weight distribution throughout the car. The ride vehicle features decals including the Hersheypark Logo, the Laff Trakk logo, and multiple playing cards featuring Laffing Sal.

On December 19, 2018, Laff Trakk, The Whip and Music Express were shut down after police confirmed that tear gas from their training drills infiltrated some of Hersheypark's areas. The park received complaints of coughing and sore throat localized to Midway America.

On August 15, 2025, Hersheypark announced the ride would be temporarily rethemed for the Halloween season, from September 12 to November 2, as the "Shaq-A-Licious Laff Trakk", following a tie-in promotion with the titular candy, owned by and bearing the resemblance of former NBA star Shaquille O'Neal. The ride is expected to revert to the original model following the end of the park's 2025 season. Unlike many Halloween theme park remodels that emphasize horror aspects due to the nature of the holiday, this one was intended from the start to attain a family audience, instead emphasizing, besides the candy promotion, the neon colors, upbeat music and bright lights, all typically unused for Halloween remodels, that were used for the Laff Trakk remodel.

== See also ==
- 2015 in amusement parks
