= Ratanga Junction =

Defunct amusement park in South Africa

- Interactive map of Ratanga Junction
- Location: Century City, Cape Town, South Africa
- Coordinates: 33.8985454°S 18.5062048°E
- Status: Defunct
- Opened: December 1998
- Closed: 1 May 2018
- Website: http://www.ratanga.co.za/

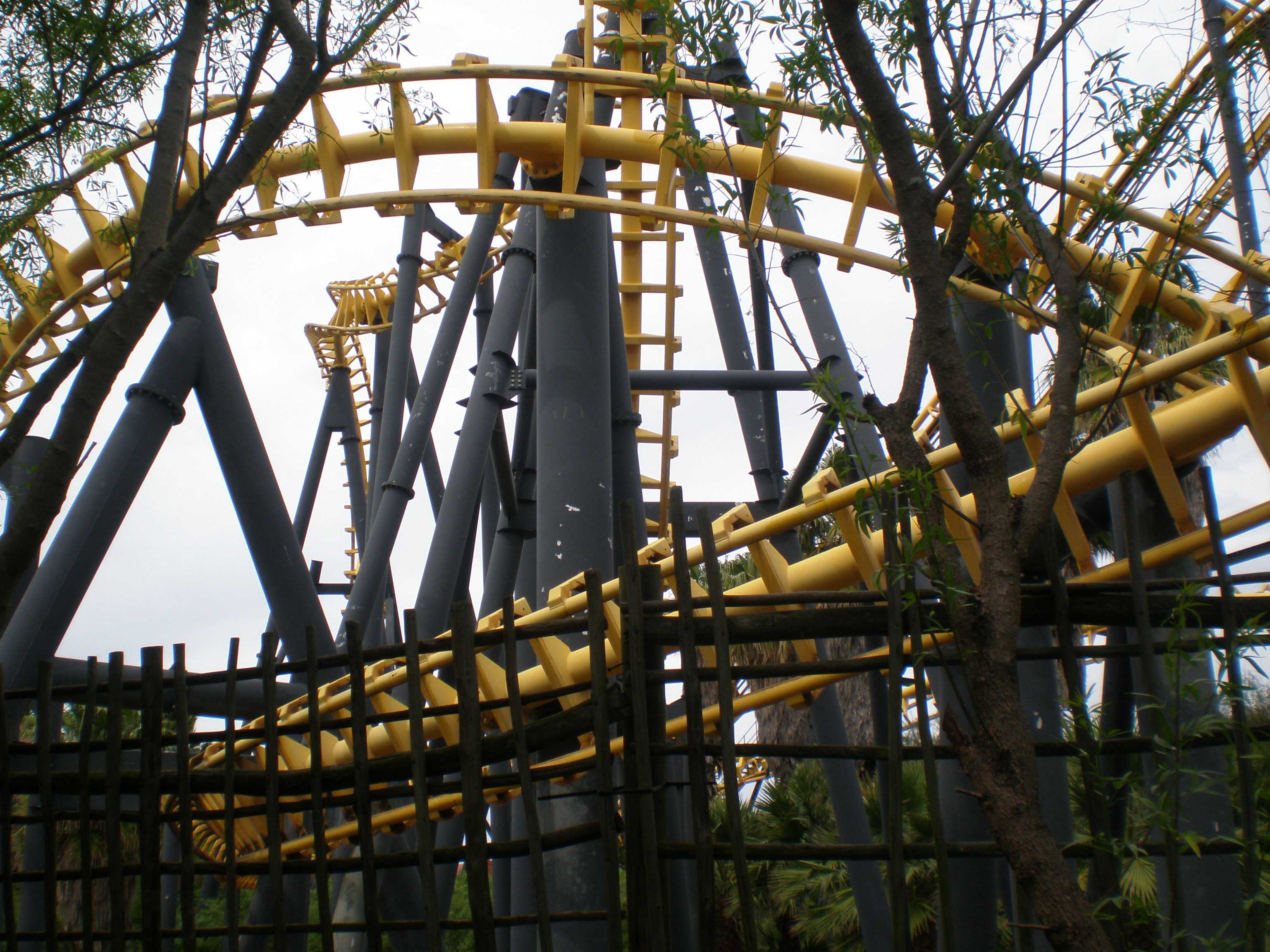
Cobra at Ratanga Junction.

Ratanga Junction was an amusement park that operated from 1998 to 2018 in Century City, Cape Town in South Africa.

The park opened in December 1998 as part of the development of the Century City area, adjacent to Cape Town's biggest shopping centre, Canal Walk. Its biggest ride was the Cobra rollercoaster. Ratanga Junction had a tropical island theme as can be seen in its logo and the fact that the park hosted several wet rides.

Since early on Ratanga Junction struggled financially, scaling back the number of restaurants throughout the early 2000s and rumours of its imminent closure going back as far as 2004. These rumours were exacerbated by the park closing during winter to prevent running at a loss. Part of Ratanga Junction was permamently closed in 2014 to make way for the Century City Square development, with the Diamond Devil Run and Crocodile Gorge rides decommissioned. Diamond Devil Run was reopened as Tren Minero at the Fantasilandia park in Chile. The park closed permanently on 1 May 2018. The Cobra rollercoaster was bought by Lost Island Theme Park in Iowa, where it currently operates as Nokupo Air Coaster.

After the closure, the Ratanga Junction area was redeveloped for residential apartments, offices, hotels, restaurants and retail. Much of the area now forms Ratanga Park, a waterbody and public park, which also hosts part of the Century City Parkrun.
