= Century City, Cape Town =

Century City
- Suburb of Cape Town
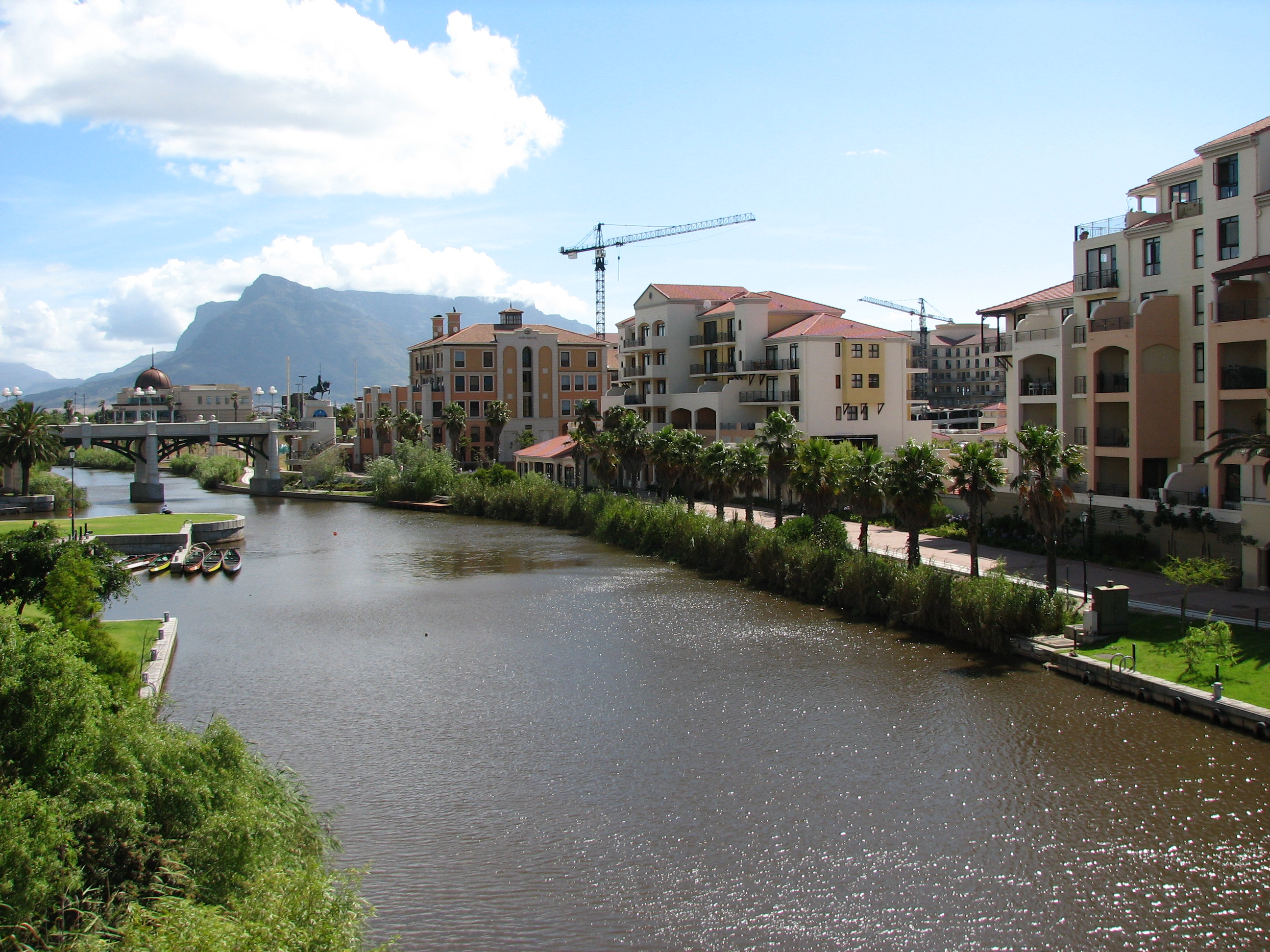
- The main canal within Century City, with Table Mountain in the background
- Interactive map of Century City
- Coordinates: 33°53′30″S 18°30′30″E
- Country: South Africa
- Province: Western Cape
- Municipality: City of Cape Town

Area
  - Total: 2.62 km^{2} (1.01 sq mi)

Population (2011)
  - Total: 4,239
  - Density: 1,620/km^{2} (4,190/sq mi)

Racial makeup (2011)
  - Black African: 15.9%
  - Coloured: 10.1%
  - Indian/Asian: 19.9%
  - White: 49.6%
  - Other: 4.5%

First languages (2011)
  - English: 69.6%
  - Afrikaans: 15.7%
  - Xhosa: 2.9%
  - Zulu: 1.2%
  - Other: 10.6%
- Time zone: UTC+2 (SAST)
- Postal code (street): 7441
- PO box: 7446
- Area code: 021

Century City is a suburb of Cape Town, South Africa. It is a mixed-use development, which includes residential, retail, commercial, and entertainment components.

The neighbourhood is located 10 km to the north-east of Cape Town CBD, along the N1 freeway, and is traversed by numerous waterways, wetlands, and canals.

Canal Walk shopping mall, which forms part of Century City, is Cape Town's largest mall, and a major shopping destination for residents.

== Development ==
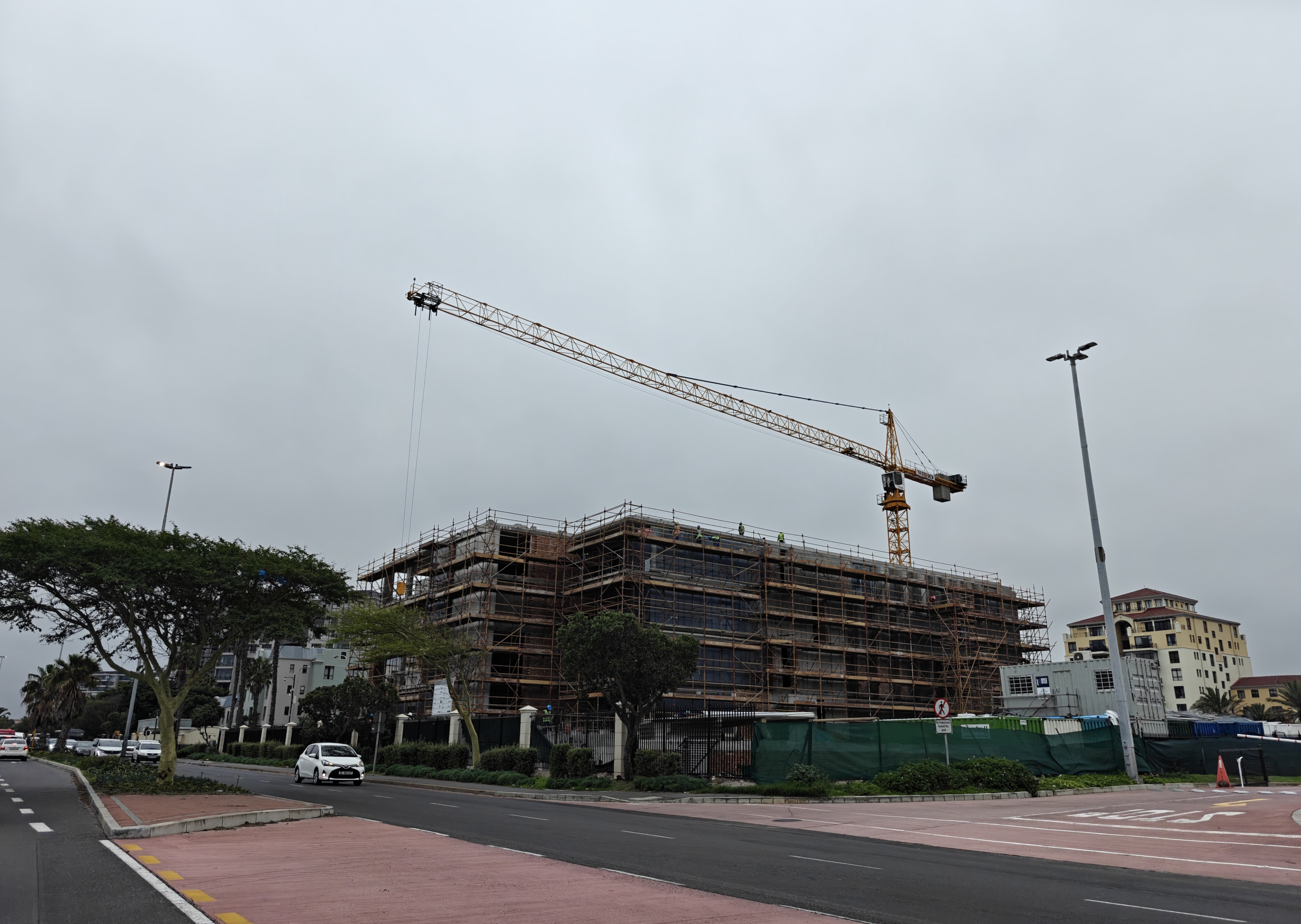
Construction in Century City, in May 2026. Passenger vehicle lanes are separated by dedicated, red MyCiTi BRT lanes

Development began under Monex Development in 1997 and continues under the new owners, Rabie Property Group. Century City's original developments were the Ratanga Junction theme park and Canal Walk shopping centre. When it was opened in October 2000, Canal Walk was the largest shopping mall in Africa and the Southern Hemisphere in lettable area at 141,000 m^{2}.

The Ratanga Junction theme park closed in May 2018 after many years of financial problems. The site was redeveloped and was replaced by Ratanga Park (a recreational park), as well as numerous residential developments.

In February 2026, a major new development project for Century City was announced. The Canal Plaza office development, seeking to capture growing office demand in the area, will be managed in partnership with Gutsche Investment (GIMCO), the Moolman Group, and Blue Dawn Capital. Canal Plaza is planned to include a gross leasable area (GLA of) 10,333 sqm, across four floors. Set for occupation in May 2027, it will overlook the Intaka Island Nature Reserve.

Canal Plaza is planned to achieve a 4-Star Green rating by including backup power and water. Located at 1 Heron Place, the new development will have nearby access to public transit, via a MyCiTi BRT stop.

== Canal Walk ==
The Canal Walk shopping mall is a major development within the suburb. It is the largest mall in Cape Town and the third largest in Africa, with over 400 stores, over 8,000 parking bays, a wide variety of restaurants, and an arcade.

== Conservation ==
Built on a wetland area, Century City needed to comply with conservation measures. Intaka Island is a 16 hectare wetland area within the development. The wetland naturally cleans the water in the canals in the high-density development area.

== Criticism ==
There were concerns that Century City would cause decentralisation from the Cape Town central business district (CBD), but thanks to the city improvement district (CID) and urban renewal efforts spearheaded by the Cape Town Partnership (CTP), this has not happened.

This development thus remains another commercial node in the Cape Town metropolitan area while the city centre remains vibrant. More recently, the development has been criticised for causing traffic problems. Measures have been taken with an aim to improve congestion during peak hours.
