= Mother city =

Mother city may refer to:

- Cape Town, the second-most populated city in South Africa
- Metropolis, a large urban area
- Mother City F.C., a football club based in Cape Town
- Daura, Nigerian city and "mother" of the Hausa Kingdoms

== See also ==
- Mother of Cities (disambiguation)
- Queen City (disambiguation)
