= Mother of Cities =

Mother of Cities may refer to:

- Mecca, is the capital of Mecca Province in western Saudi Arabia, the holiest city in Islam, and is referenced in the Quran as the 'mother of cities'. See Quran 6:92, 42:7.
- Asunción, capital and largest city of Paraguay.
- Balkh, among the oldest cities of Afghanistan.
- Prague, capital and largest city of the Czech Republic.
- Santiago del Estero, oldest city of Argentina.

== See also ==
- Mother city (disambiguation)
- Queen City (disambiguation)
