= Rewind Racers =

Family roller coaster at Adventure City

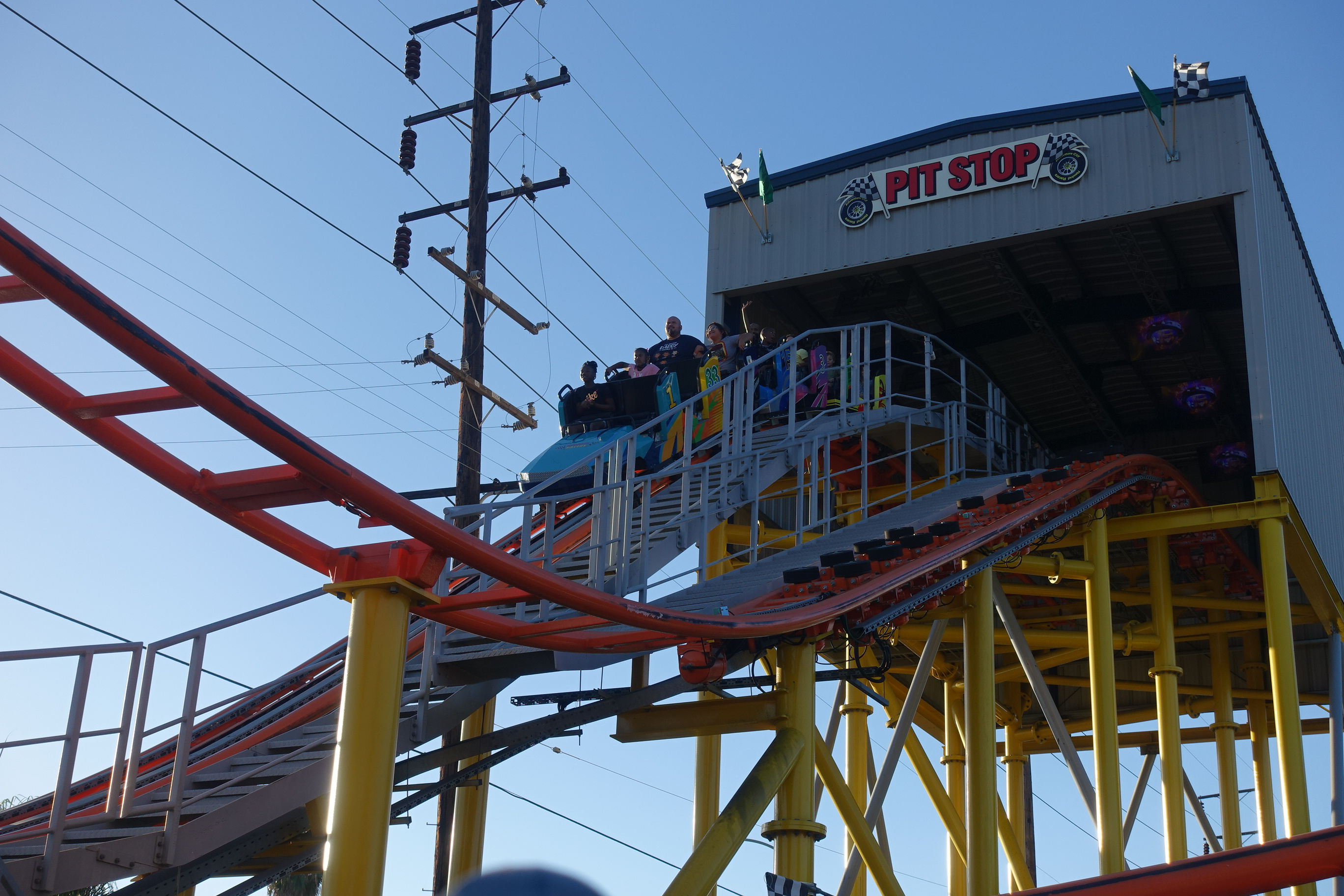
- Train descending as it exits the pit stop

Adventure City
- Location: Adventure City
- Coordinates: 33.815057°N 117.992996°W
- Status: Operating
- Opening date: June 6, 2015
- Cost: $2 million
- Replaced: Tree Top Racers

General statistics
- Type: Steel – Shuttle
- Manufacturer: Gerstlauer
- Model: Shuttle Family Coaster
- Lift/launch system: Chain lift hill
- Height: 39.3 ft (12.0 m)
- Length: 593.8 ft (181.0 m)
- Speed: 31.1 mph (50.1 km/h)
- Inversions: 0
- Height restriction: 39 in (99 cm)
- Trains: Single train with 7 cars; riders arranged 2 across in a single row for a total of 14 riders per train
- Website: Official website
- Rewind Racers at RCDB

Rewind Racers is a steel shuttle roller coaster located at Adventure City in Stanton, California, United States. The ride, which opened on June 6, 2015, is a Shuttle Family Coaster model manufactured by Gerstlauer. The $2 million attraction was the largest single investment in Adventure City’s 20-year history when it was announced, and it was billed as the first family shuttle coaster in North America. It replaced Tree Top Racers, a 1958 Wild Mouse roller coaster that operated at the park from 1999 to 2012.

Designed for Adventure City’s compact site along Beach Boulevard, Rewind Racers stands nearly 40 feet (12 m) tall and reaches a maximum speed of 31.1 mph (50.1 km/h). The attraction features a racing theme with a race car-themed train, narrated sound and video effects, and a pit stop structure spanning two lift hills. Its single 14-passenger train traverses the layout in both directions between the lift hills.

== History ==
Tree Top Racers was a vintage Wild Mouse roller coaster built by Miler Manufacturing. Prior to being relocated to Adventure City in 1999, it first opened in 1958 and had operated with Midway Amusements in Brisbane, Australia. Adventure City rethemed and refurbished the coaster, adding computer-controlled brakes. Following its closure in 2012, it remained standing in 2013 before its eventual removal from the park.

In February 2014, Adventure City announced plans to build a replacement called Rewind Racers, a $2 million Shuttle Family Coaster model from Gerstlauer. The project represented the largest single investment in the park's 20-year history. Scheduled to open that summer, it was billed as the first family shuttle coaster in North America and was designed to accommodate children as short as 39 inches (990 mm). Gerstlauer worked with Adventure City to fit a custom layout onto the park's compact site along Beach Boulevard.

Construction began in September 2014, and by November crews had installed 57 underground concrete columns to support the seven-car train. Track assembly was expected to begin in December, followed by testing and a possible opening as early as March 2015. Rewind Racers eventually opened to the public on June 6, 2015. When it opened, the ride featured sound and video effects to support its racing theme. An overhead structure covering both lift hills and themed as a pit stop was added later.

== Ride experience ==
After riders are secured, the train departs the station backward and ascends the first chain lift hill, backing into the themed pit stop covering at the top. Following a brief narration, it descends forward and travels through the station at approximately 30 mph (48 km/h). The train then navigates a banked left turn, an airtime hill, a headchopper element, and a helix that spirals clockwise.

At the opposite end of the layout, it ascends an adjacent booster-wheel lift hill and re-enters the garage. Following a brief narration warning riders they are falling behind in the race, the train reverses direction, retracing the layout while traveling backward. It passes through the station as a checkered flag appears on a video screen, climbs the first lift hill, and then returns to the station, where magnetic brakes bring it to a stop.

== Characteristics ==
Rewind Racers is a shuttle coaster, meaning its track does not form a complete circuit and the train instead reverses direction during the ride. The coaster stands 39.3 feet (12.0 m) tall, features a length of 593.8 feet (181.0 m), and reaches a maximum speed of 31.1 mph (50.1 km/h). Its track is 2 ft 7+1/2 in (800 mm) wide, and its custom layout occupies a compact site along Beach Boulevard, where portions of the track pass approximately 10 feet (3.0 m) from roadside telephone poles and power lines. The ride operates with one 14-passenger train consisting of seven cars that each seat two riders.

=== Theme ===
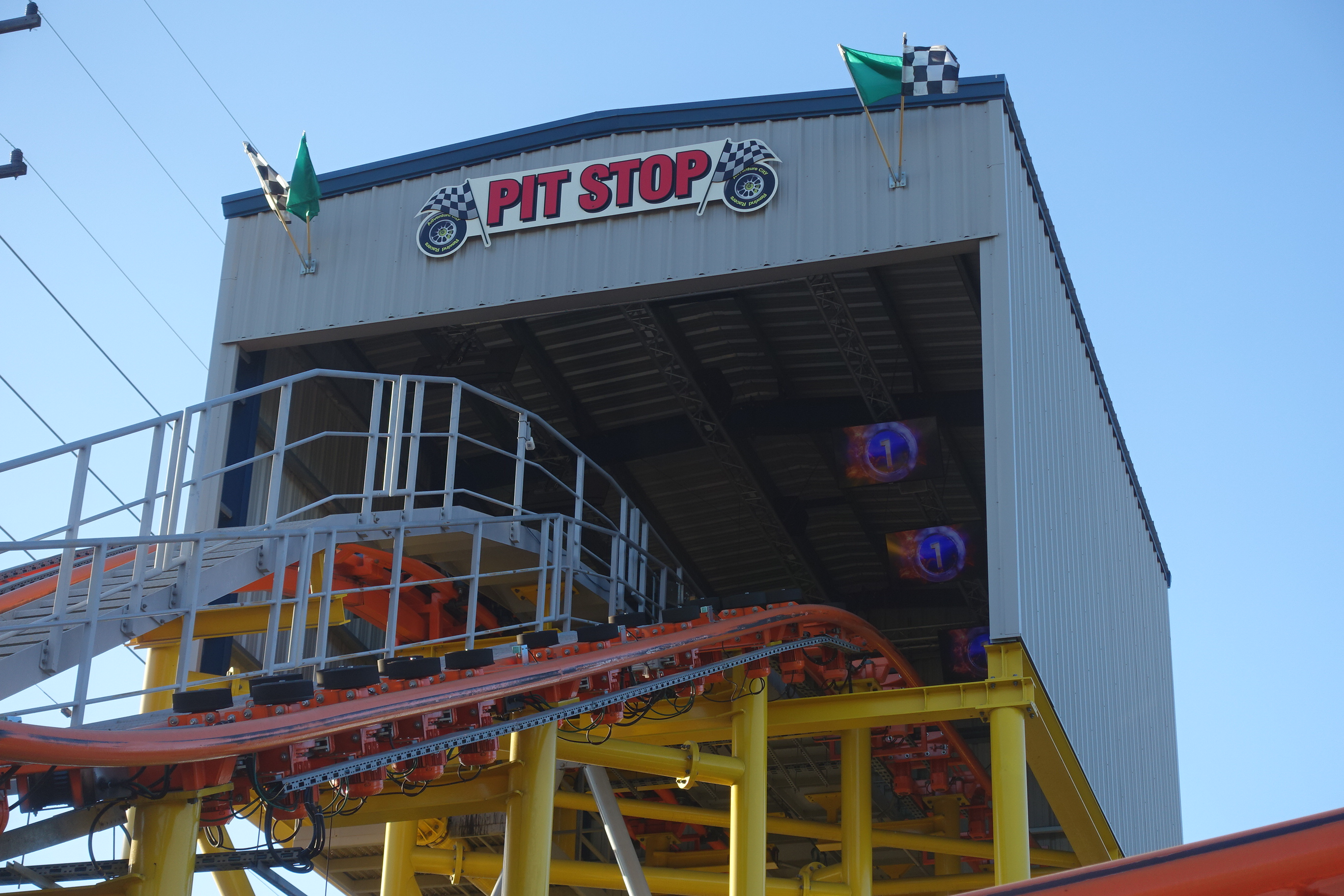
The pit stop structure over the lift hills

The purchase of Rewind Racers from Gerstlauer was brokered by Adam Sandy of Ride Entertainment Group. R&R Creative Amusement Designs, an Anaheim-based firm, developed the coaster’s racing theme and led design of its train, queue, and station, along with production of the preshow video. The train’s cars feature colorful racing graphics and individual numbers, while a video featuring Max the Mechanic presents the safety instructions and introduces the ride’s race-day premise.

At opening, sound and video effects on Rewind Racers supported its racing theme. Adventure City later added a pit stop structure over the two lift hills, incorporating additional video and special effects to enhance the ride's theming and existing narration.
