= Canal Walk =

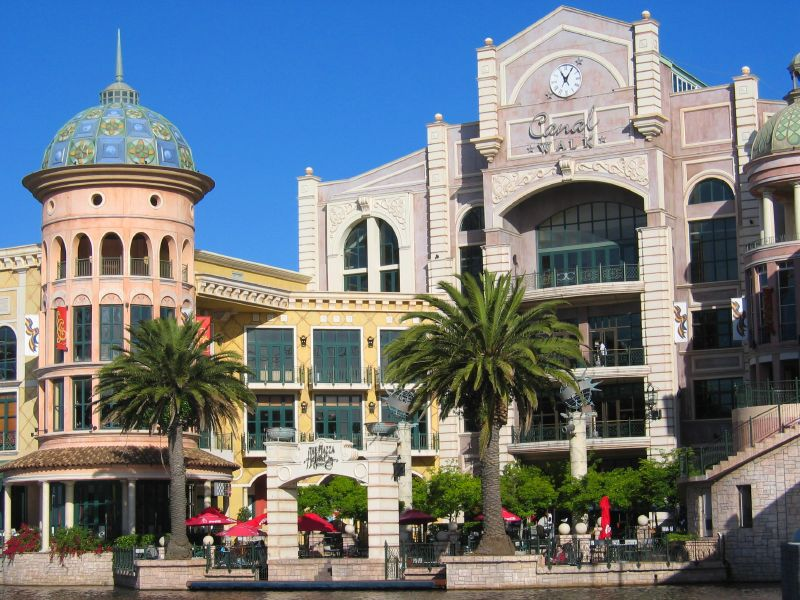
- Interactive map of the Canal Walk area

General information
- Type: Shopping mall
- Architectural style: Cape Venetian
- Location: Century Boulevard, Century City, Cape Town, South Africa
- Coordinates: 33.8946°S 18.5105°E
- Construction started: 2000; 26 years ago
- Opening: 26 October 2000; 25 years ago
- Cost: est. ~ R1.3 billion
- Owner: Hyprop Investment Limited (80%); Ellerine Bros (Pty) Ltd (20%)

Height
- Height: 2 stories
- Roof: Domed

Technical details
- Floor count: 2
- Floor area: 141,000 m^{2} (1,520,000 sq ft)

Other information
- Number of stores: 400+
- Parking: 8,000+

Website
- https://canalwalk.co.za

Canal Walk is a shopping mall located in Cape Town, South Africa. It is part of Century City, a suburb and 250 hectare mixed-use development, built in 1997, that sits alongside the N1 freeway.

The largest mall in Cape Town and the third largest in Africa, Canal Walk is built in what the developers call "Cape Venetian architecture". The mall features over 400 stores, over 8,000 parking bays, a wide variety of restaurants, and an arcade.

== History ==
Canal Walk was built in October 2000, at an estimated cost of around R1.3 billion. At the time of completion, the mall spanned around 125,000 square meters, and hosted 9,600 square meters of office space.

The mall is owned by investment companies Hyprop (80%) and Ellerine Bros Ltd (20%). In 2023, it was Hyprop's strongest performer, generating R1 billion in the month of December.

In 2024, Canal Walk partnered with over 28 local artists and designers, and 200 students, to host an immersive art installation. This included the Blue Butterfly, which was created using over 200,000 beads, by learners from Marconi Bean Primary School, under the guidance of Art Afrique's master beading artist, Thokozani Twala. The installation also featured fynbos artwork, to honor Cape Town's natural beauty.

== Features ==
Canal Walk is classed as a super-regional mall, and is the only one of that size in the Western Cape province. It is open 7 days a week from 9AM to 9PM - longer hours than the norm for malls in Cape Town.

Canal Walk is home to over 400 stores, spread across almost 150,000 square meters, as well as 12 entrances, and over 8,000 parking bays.

Categories of retail and services offered at Canal Walk include books, cards, gifts, banking, cellular services, health, hair, beauty, decor, homeware, clothing, jewelry, fitness, toys, technology, food and beverage (including tea and coffee), pets, luggage, and automobiles.

Anchor tenants include Woolworths, Checkers, Pick n Pay, Game, H&M, @home, Honda, Cape Union Mart, and Edgars.

The mall hosts a variety of restaurants and fast-food chains in its large food court which spans 2 floors, with an additional 3rd floor for Spur and Bossa. Also within the food court is Wonderland play centre, which features an arcade, a bowling alley, and pool tables.

Also within the food court, Nu Metro cinema offers Standard 2D/3D movie showings, as well as its specialty cinemas; Scene V.I.P, Scene Xtreme, 4DX, and Kidz.

Canal Walk features a 2,600 square meter indoor adventure park, called Freedom Adventure Park, which offers zip lines, netball, basketball, drop slides, an obstacle course and a toddler play area.

== Concepts and flagships ==
Canal Walk has hosted the launch of numerous stores, including the first JD Sports store in South Africa, the first stand-alone Silki store in the country, and the maiden flagship store for Shift Espresso Bar.

== Sustainability ==
Canal Walk makes use of numerous environmentally sustainable construction elements, including energy-efficient electronic ballasts, green roofing, efficient insulation, and a food waste yard for composting. The building's management has implemented a strategy to reduce water consumption, with a focus on customer and store usage. Efforts to reduce energy consumption are also undertaken.

For making Cape Town greener and more environmentally sustainable, the Green Building Council of South Africa (GBCSA) awarded Canal Walk a 5-Star Existing Building Performance v1 green rating in 2020. The mall received the award again in 2024.

Canal Walk is involved with numerous community upliftment organizations, such as Ikamva Labantu, Stop Hunger Now, and LEAP Science & Maths Schools. The mall also assists schools and charity organizations in the Western Cape with their fundraising efforts continuously, and encourages its patrons to participate as well.

== Gallery ==
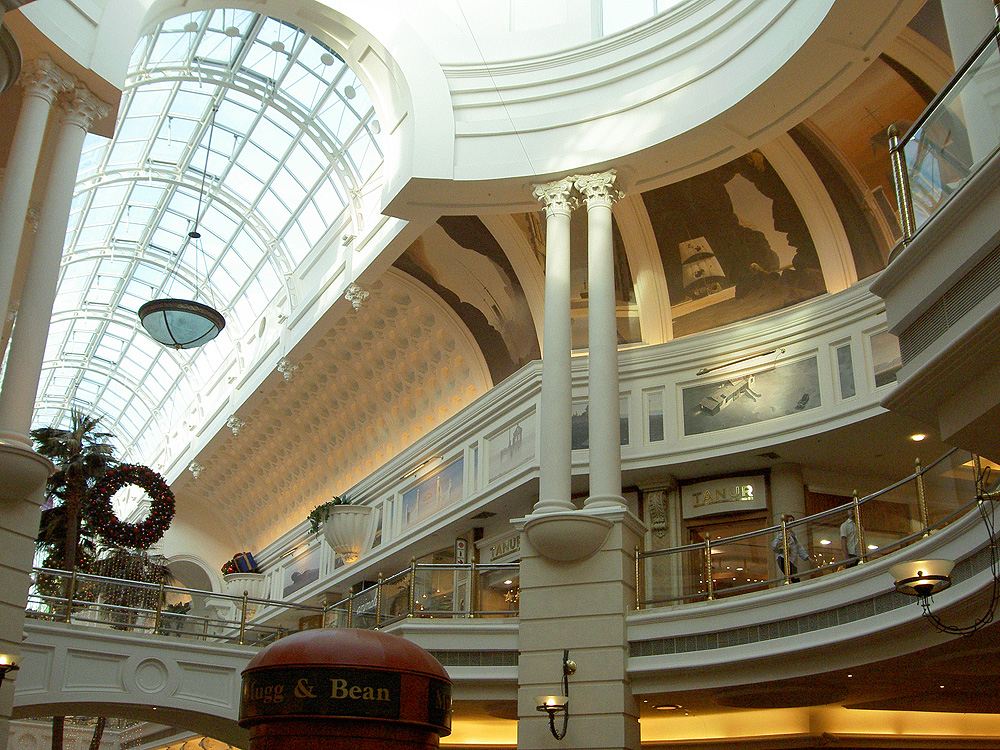
Atrium-like glass ceilings provide natural light to the double-story mall.

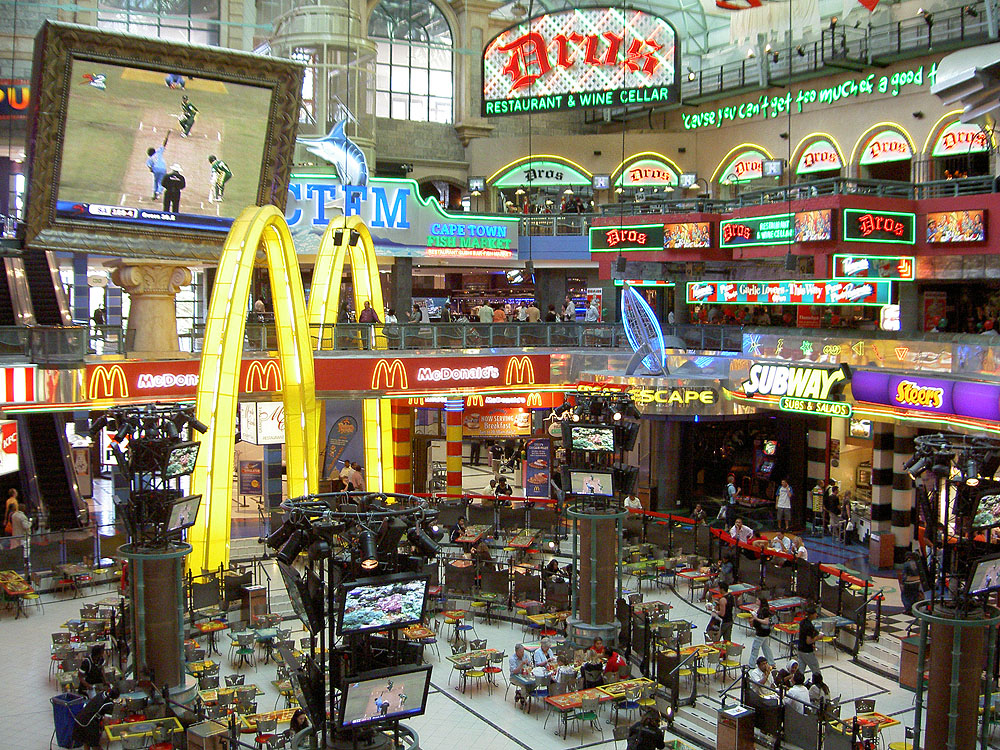
A massive food court with multi-media entertainment.
