= Adventureland (New York) =

Amusement park in East Farmingdale, New York, U.S.

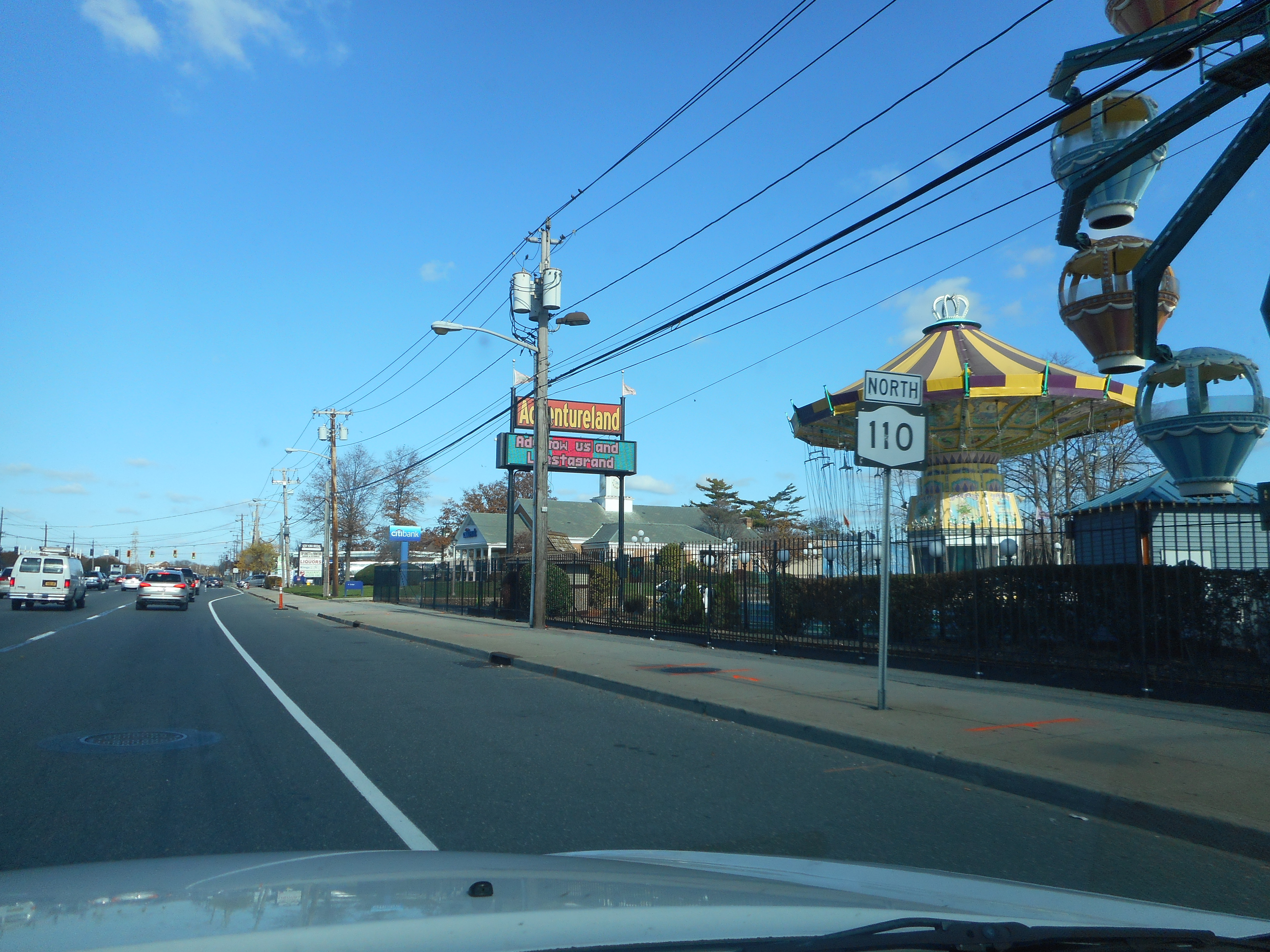
- Adventureland as seen from NY 110.
- Interactive map of Adventureland
- Location: East Farmingdale, New York, U.S.
- Coordinates: 40°45′09″N 73°25′14″W
- Status: Operating
- Opened: 1962
- Slogan: Long Island's Amusement park since 1962
- Operating season: weekends in March, April and May; Open all summer; weekends in September and October
- Area: 12 acres (4.9 ha)

Attractions
- Total: 37
- Roller coasters: 3
- Water rides: 2
- Other rides: 32
- Website: www.adventureland.us

Adventureland is an amusement park in East Farmingdale, New York, located on Route 110 (Broad Hollow Road). Adventureland has been operating since 1962 and is a popular attraction for children, schools, and day camps on Long Island.

There are more than 30 rides, including three roller coasters and two water rides. Adventureland is open seasonally: weekends in March, April, May, September and October and all days in June, July, and August.

== History ==
=== Founding under Alvin Cohen ===
In 1960, Alvin Cohen and Herbert Bundin purchased six acres of land on Route 110 in East Farmingdale using money loaned from family members. Adventureland 110 Playland, as it was originally called, opened in July 1962. At the time, it had the Adventurers Inn restaurant, an indoor arcade, four rides (a carousel, Iron Horse train, Little Dipper coaster, and boats), and a mini golf course. Cohen's family members worked at the park.

As the park's success grew, the name was changed to 110 Adventureland. In 1965 the first major ride opened, a 500-foot (150 m) long Skyliner. Though Steeplechase Park and Freedomland U.S.A. had closed in 1964, Adventureland continued to thrive.

In 1973, three new thrill rides were built: the Toboggan (a compact roller coaster), the Amor Express (a high speed circular ride) and the Galaxy (a steel coaster). The next season brought on the Wave Swinger, a European-style spinning swings ride, one of the first of the kind in America. With the success of the Wave Swinger, Cohen and Bundin decided to import more European rides, and in 1976 imported the Enterprise and Troika (both spinning rides).

=== Sale to William Miller ===
On September 15, 1977, William Miller, a German-born businessman who owned a company that imported European rides, purchased the park. At this time, Adventureland 110 had 19 rides.

In 1978, Miller sold off older attractions and bought several new rides, including an antique auto ride, which originally operated at the 1964 New York World's Fair and was designed by Arrow Development. He also added bumper cars. In the first season under new management, profits increased 50%. Also, during this time Miller changed the name to just Adventureland.

In 1979, Miller bought a new Merry Go Round and the Black Hole and Lost Continent rides. At the end of the 1982 season, Miller brought in the Looping Star, another European ride. In 1983, the UFO, Gravitron, bumper cars, and bumper boats were added to replace the Black Hole, Enterprise, and Troika. A Bavarian Village with food outlets and stores was also added.

Starting in the early 1980's local bands played at the park's bandstand. Over the next few years, brick walkways replaced blacktop, and the landscaping was done over. The Lost Continent was turned into 1313 Cemetery Way, a haunted house ride with a talking tree and owl. Music and lighting elements were added to the bumper cars in 1984. By 1985, Miller had invested $5 million in renovations and expansions.

=== Gentile family ownership ===
In 1987, Miller sold the park to Anthony Gentile, his brother Johnny, Peter Amoruso, and Dominic Cosola, a group that had operated the restaurant since 1977. The Gentile family has owned the park ever since. In this new era, Gentile added a Pirate Ship ride, the Scorpion, and a new mini golf course named Treasure Island. By 1989, the park had 25 rides.

By the end of the decade, Adventureland expanded into other endeavors. Gentile opened Splish Splash and Bullwinkle's in 1989. Both parks were later sold to Palace Entertainment in 1999. New rides were regular through the 1990s. In 1991, the Galaxy was replaced by Hurricane, another roller coaster. In 1992, Super Raider, a climbing/fun house was opened. For the next season, the Scorpion ride was switched out for Surf Dance. Tubs of Fun and Flying Clowns replaced older kiddie rides. In 1995, the antique car ride was updated and the Balloon Wheel replaced the Big Wheel. The park also attempted to buy Nunley's Carousel before it was acquired by Nassau County. In 1996, the Dragon Wagon replaced the Sooper Jet, a kiddie roller coaster. Then, in 1999, a double decker merry go round replaced the old merry go round.

By 2000, the park boasted 24 rides, an 18-hole mini-golf course, and 300 games. That year, it added a medium-size roller coaster, called the Paul Bunyan Express. In 2001, it was renamed the Lady Bug Coaster and Kiddie Land was created with rides for small children: the Caterpillar, Free Whale, and Hip Hop. The mini golf course was also replaced with Adventure Falls, a log flume water ride. In 2002, for the park's 40th anniversary, Top Scan, Balloon Tower, and Music Express were added. The next year, Viking Voyage replaced the Kiddie Boats, the park's last original ride, and Tour de Paris was added. In 2004, the Crocodile Run Jet Ski replaced the Bumper Boats.

In 2006, Adventureland began its green initiative by converting the park's roadside sign to use 9,000 LED bulbs. A kiddie log flume, called Little Dipper, was added where the Top Scan used to be and the Frisbee replaced Surf Dance. In 2007, they also added a "Glass House" (a.k.a. "Mirror House") to where some of their games were and also bought all of the outside games and updated them. In 2009, the ride Flying Puppies replaced Tubs of Fun. A private VIP room was added, and the food court and gift shop were expanded. In 2010, a new Haunted House, imported from Europe, was added to the park in place of the former Haunted House. The talking tree and owl were restored in 2013.

In 2012, Adventureland celebrated its 50th anniversary. The park introduced a new superhero mascot named Alfie. The train station was moved to the former area of the Glass House. The old train station became a Wi-Fi lounge and patio. The Super Raider was also retired and replaced by a similar attraction called Pirate Island. In addition, the ticket booths, restaurant areas, and parking lot were remodeled. The incandescent bulbs on its Ferris wheel were replaced with LEDs.

Tony Gentile died in 2013 and his sons Steven and Paul took over operations. That season, the Free Whale and John Silver's tower were replaced with Alfie's Express, a train ride for younger kids, and Surf's Up, a moderate thrill kiddie ride. Both were manufactured by SBF rides. The Kiddie Swings were also replaced with a newer model, named Alfie's Swings. Also in 2013, a stage was built across from the Bavarian Village Gift Shop and a charging station was installed next to City Hall. Many locations throughout the park were updated with energy-efficient LED lighting, most notably the train station, and a solar panel system was installed to power the park's maintenance facility. At the end of the season, the Flying Puppies and Tour De Paris were closed. On select night's throughout October, Adventureland was host to an exclusive fundraising event, called Nightmare on the Midway. The haunted Halloween event featured four haunted attractions, live actors and multiple scare zones.

The Gentile family established the Helping Hands Foundation in 2014 to raise money for local causes. At the beginning of the season, two new attractions were opened: NYC race and the Teacups, both made by SBF. A VIP parking car port with solar panels was built in the back parking lot. The lights on Wave Swing were updated with LED technology. A second charging station was opened near the pirate ship and rear entrance of the park. In October 2014, the Hurricane roller coaster was closed and dismantled. It was replaced by a similar ride, Turbulence, which opened in 2015. That year, Adventureland debuted its mobile app. The park updated its bumper cars in 2016. A new helicopter ride for kids, tokenless arcade games, and a City Hall for park services were added in 2017. A new thrill ride called Mystery Mansion replaced the Ghost House and the Drop N' Twist in 2018.

The Ladybug Coaster was converted into the Rattlesnake Coaster in 2019, and the Lighthouse Drop Tower was added and Saf-T-Swim's Rescue Boats replaced the Crocodile Run, a similar ride. For the 2020 season, the Balloon Tower was replaced by the Sports Tower. However, the park was temporarily closed for 14 months due to the COVID-19 pandemic. During the park's closure, it hosted drive-in movies and concerts. When it reopened mid-April 2021, the park instituted a new park admission fee, requiring all guests to pay to enter. This policy became permanent. In 2022, the park celebrated its 60th anniversary and spent $2 million to install Fireball, the park's third roller coaster. A children's carousel was retired to make room.

In March 2024, Adventureland announced a $10-15 million redevelopment over five years that will update 10% of the property. It was announced that the Adventure Cove section of the park would be demolished in favor of the Legacy Corner. The Log Flume, Pirate Ship, and Spinning Cars were removed and will be replaced by Moon Chaser, Jr. Pirate Ship, and Wave Twister. Catholic Health was announced as the park's new lead sponsor and City Hall Building was renamed the Catholic Health Wellness Center.

On February 23, 2026, Adventureland would post on Facebook and Instagram that the Moon Chaser ride would be permanently closed for undisclosed reasons. On March 3, 2026, it was announced that three new rides would be opening for the spring season as part of the "$10 million park redevelopment plan" started in 2024, with the final fifth phase ending by 2028.

== Current rides and attractions ==
=== Thrill rides ===
| Name | Year opened | Type | Manufacturer |
|---|---|---|---|
| Fireball | 2022 | Roller Ball /19M | Ride Engineers Switzerland |
| Musik Express | 1973 | Musik Express | Mack Rides |
| Mystery Mansion | 2018 | Ride Through Haunted House | Gosetto SRL |
| Frisbee | 2006 | Pendulum Ride | HUSS |
| Route 110 Bumper Cars | 2017 | Bumper Cars | Larson International |
| Turbulence | 2015 | Spinning Coaster | Mack Rides |
| Rattlesnake Coaster | 2019 | Medium Tivoli Coaster | Zierer |
| Wave Twister | 2026 | Spinning Coaster | RES Rides AG |
| The Ram Pirateship | 2026 | Pirateship | HUSS |

=== Kiddie rides ===
| Name | Year opened | Type | Manufacturer |
|---|---|---|---|
| Alfie Express | 2013 | Rio Grande Train | Zamperla |
| Alfie Swings | 2013 | Kiddie Swings | Sartori Rides |
| Caterpillar | 2001 | Monorail | Zamperla |
| Helicopters | 2017 | Helicopter | Zamperla |
| Jr. Pirate Ship | 2024 | Mini Pirate Ship | SBF Visa Group |
| NYC Race | 2014 | Convoy | Zamperla |
| Pirate Island | 2012 | Play Structure/Renegade | Wisdom Rides |
| Teacups | 2014 | Spinning Teacups | Zamperla |
| Viking Voyage | 2003 | Dragon Boats | Zierer |

=== Water rides ===
| Name | Year opened | Type | Manufacturer |
|---|---|---|---|
| Little Dipper | 2006 | Mini Log Flume | ABC Rides |
| Safety Swim Rescue Boats | 2019 | Wild Water Rundown | Zierer |

=== Games ===
- Balloon Bust
- Topspin
- Frog Bog
- Goblet Toss
- Highstriker
- Long Range Basketball
- Ring Toss
- Rising Water
- Short Range Basketball
- Stinky Feet
- Whac-A-Mole
- Whopper Water

=== Attractions ===
- Arcade

== Former rides and attractions ==
- 1001 Knights (1983-1984)
- 1313 Cemetery Way (1986–2010)
- Adventure Falls (2001-2023)
- Big Wheel (–1995)
- Balloon Tower
- Bumper Boats (1983–2004)
- Cinema 180 (-1980)
- Crocodile Run (2004–2019)
- Dragon Wagon (1996–)
- Drop N Twist Tower (2010–2017)
- Enterprise (1976–1983)
- Flower Jet(-1985)
- Flying Puppies (2008–2013)
- Free Whale (–2013)
- Galaxi (1973–1990)
- Granny Bugs
- Gravitron (1984-1990)
- John Silver's Tower (2004–2013)
- Jolly Caterpillar (1965–2001)
- Kiddie Boats (1962–2003)
- Kiddie Carousel (2000-2021)
- Kinder Carousel
- Little Dipper Roller Coaster (1962–)
- Log Flume (-2023)
- Looping Star (1982–2003)
- Mini Golf Course (1962–1987)
- Moon Taxi
- Original Carousel (1962–1999)
- Original Bumper Cars (1983–2017)
- Original Helicopters
- Parachute Drop
- Paratrooper
- Pirate Ship (1987-2023) (it returned in 2026)
- Recording Studio
- Satellites
- Scorpion (1987–1993)
- Skooters
- Skyliner (1965–1981)
- Sooper Jet (1982–1996)
- Space Age
- Spinning Cars (2000-2023)
- Super Raider (1992–2012)
- Surf Dance (1993–2006)
- The Black Hole -Trabant/Cinema 180 Merger (1981–1983)
- The Ghost House (2010–2018)
- The Hurricane (1991–2014)
- The Ladybug (2000–2019)
- The Lost Continent (1979–1986)
- The UFO (1983–1986)
- Tilt-A-Whirl
- Toboggan (1973–1979)
- Top Scan (2003–2005)
- Tour De Paris (2003–2013)
- Trabant (-1980)
- Treasure Island Mini Golf (1987–2001)
- Troika (1976–1983)
- Tubs of Fun (1993–2009)
- Moon Chaser (2024-2025)
- Video Studio

== Incidents ==
In May 1984, the 1313 Cemetery Way haunted house attraction was the victim of arson that caused $2,000 worth of damage.

Two unrelated deaths occurred within a week of each other in the summer of 2005. The first victim was an 18-year-old ride operator for the Ladybug Coaster. The man was struck by the coaster car and died the next morning due to internal injuries. The second incident involved a 45-year-old woman on a ride called the Top Scan. She was propelled from the spinning ride and crashed into a parked car in the parking lot. The ride was never used again at Adventureland.

In 2007, a 6-year-old boy lost his balance on the Super Raider attraction and fell over, jamming his right hand between a wall and the walkway. While freeing himself, he partially severed his right hand.

In 2008, a prop of a skeleton unicycling on a tight rope fell on a 5-year-old girl. She was in the hospital for 3 days and then was released. The prop was never put back up after the incident.

In July 2013, the park suffered a 90-minute power outage when a tractor trailer crashed into a power pole on Route 110.

On July 7, 2024, a 42-year-old man from Shirley, New York was arrested for stabbing a 47-year-old Florida man after an argument in front of a child.

On June 19, 2026, a 5 year old alongside 16 children ranging from 8-12 were stuck on the new Wave Twister ride that was malfunctioning. Firefighters were called and rescued the riders.

== In popular culture ==
- Adventureland was in the music video "Love of a Lifetime" by Chaka Khan.
- Adventureland was also featured in the movie Music and Lyrics in 2007.
- Adventureland was also shown in the movie Sweet Liberty in 1986.
- The 2009 film Adventureland was based on writer and director Greg Mottola's experiences working there during his youth.
- Scenes from the season 2 premiere of The Americans were filmed at Adventureland.
- Scenes from the 2017 film Good Time take place in and were filmed at Adventureland.
- Scenes from the final episode of Unbreakable Kimmy Schmidt were filmed at Adventureland.
- Scenes from the first episode of Succession were filmed at Adventureland.
- Advertisement for Daniel "Keemstar" Keem's Cotton Candy G Fuel Flavor was filmed at Adventureland.
- The music video for the Sheira & Loli's Dittydoodle Works song "Bonkyloo" was filmed at Adventureland.
- Girl Tech commercials were filmed at Adventureland.
- Scenes from the 1982 film Beach House were filmed at Adventureland by Producer Marino Amoruso, nephew of Adventureland partner Peter Amoruso.
- Scenes from the Bupkis episode, "For Your Amusement" were filmed at Adventureland.
- Parts of the 2024 Netflix documentary Inside the Mind of a Dog were filmed at Adventureland.
