= Queen City =

Queen City may refer to:

== Media ==
- Queen City News, WJZY (channel 46), television station serving the Charlotte, North Carolina area

== Places ==
- Queen City, Iowa, a formerly inhabited place
- Queen City, Missouri
- Queen City, Texas

== Place nicknames ==
=== Canada ===
- Vancouver, British Columbia
- Toronto, Ontario
- Montreal, Quebec
- Regina, Saskatchewan

=== New Zealand ===
- Auckland, New Zealand

=== Philippines ===
- Manila or Queen City of the Pacific
- Cebu City or Queen City of the South (de facto)
- Iloilo City or Queen City of the South (de jure)
- Naga or Queen City of Bicol

=== United States ===
- Gadsden, Alabama
- Selma, Alabama or Queen City of the Blackbelt
- Tuscaloosa, Alabama
- Anchorage, Alaska
- Camden, Arkansas or Queen City of the Ouachita River
- Eureka, California or Queen City of the Ultimate West
- Denver, Colorado or Queen City of the Plains
- Gainesville, Georgia
- Hazard, Kentucky or Queen City of the Mountains
- Bangor, Maine or Queen City of the East
- Cumberland, Maryland or Queen City of the Alleghenies
- Marquette, Michigan or Queen City of the North
- Traverse City, Michigan or Queen City of the North
- Crookston, Minnesota, Queen City of the Northwest
- Virginia, Minnesota
- Greenville, Mississippi or Queen City of the Delta
- Meridian, Mississippi
- Sedalia, Missouri or Queen City of the Prairies
- Springfield, Missouri or Queen City of the Ozarks
- Helena, Montana or Queen City of the Rockies
- Manchester, New Hampshire or Queen City of the Northeast
- Beach Haven, New Jersey
- Plainfield, New Jersey
- Buffalo, New York or Queen City of the Great Lakes
- Elmira, New York
- New Rochelle, New York or Queen City of the Sound
- Poughkeepsie, New York or Queen City of the Hudson
- The New York City borough of Queens
- Charlotte, North Carolina or Queen City of the South
- Dickinson, North Dakota
- Cincinnati, Ohio or the Queen City of the West
- Ada, Oklahoma or Queen City of the Chickasaw Nation
- Allentown, Pennsylvania
- Olyphant, Pennsylvania
- Titusville, Pennsylvania
- Sioux Falls, South Dakota
- Spearfish, South Dakota
- Clarksville, Tennessee
- Del Rio, Texas or Queen City of the Rio Grande
- Mercedes, Texas or Queen City of the Rio Grande Valley
- Burlington, Vermont
- Staunton, Virginia or Queen City of the Shenandoah Valley
- Virginia Beach, Virginia
- Seattle, Washington

== See also ==
- List of city nicknames in Canada
- List of city nicknames in the United States
- Mother city (disambiguation)
- Mother of Cities (disambiguation)
- Name of Toronto
