= Turbulence (roller coaster) =

Steel spinning roller coaster at Adventureland in East Farmingdale, New York

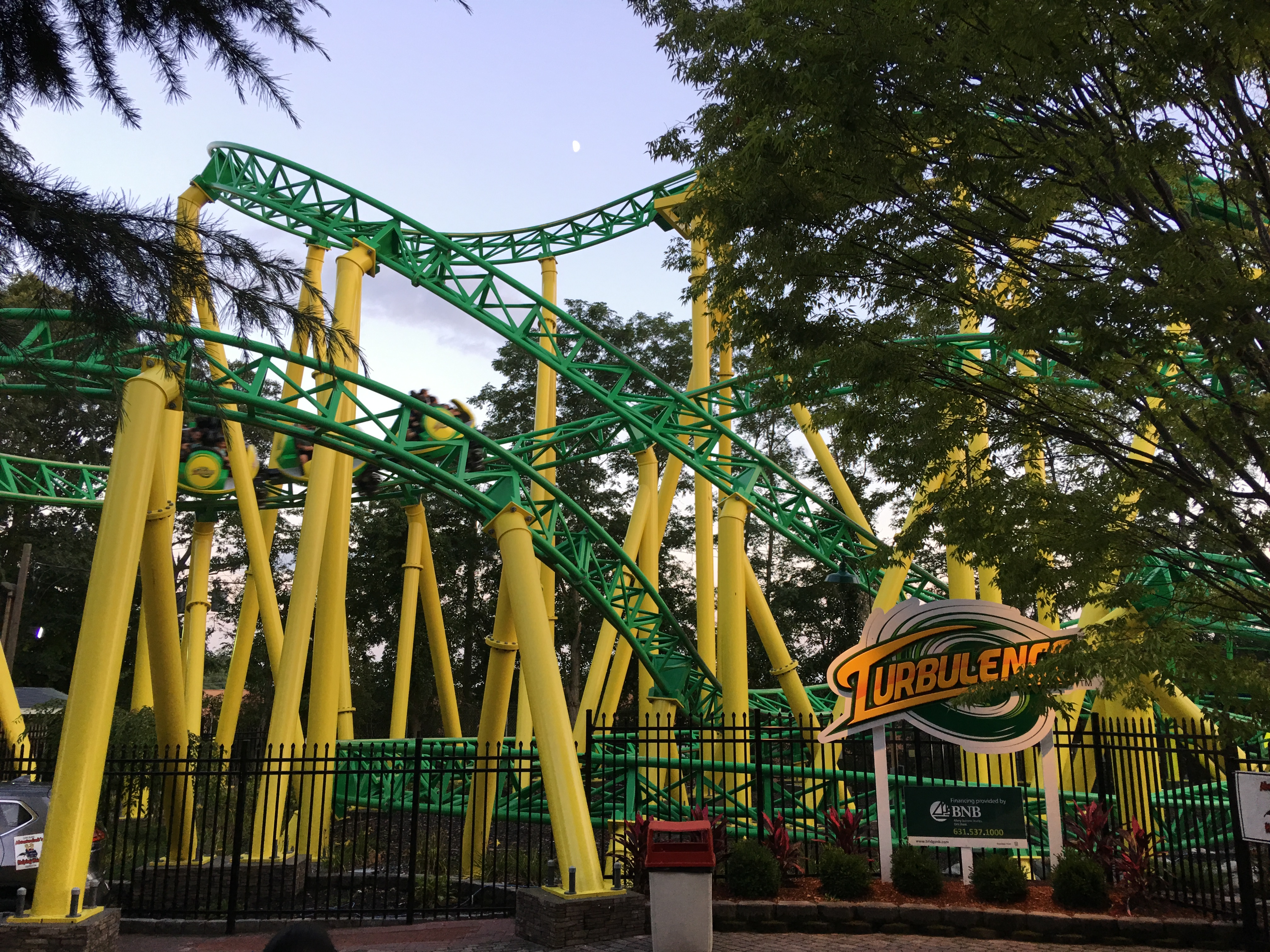

Adventureland (New York)
- Location: Adventureland (New York)
- Coordinates: 40.752494°N 73.419721°W
- Status: Operating
- Opening date: May 22, 2015; 11 years ago
- Cost: $5,000,000
- Replaced: Hurricane

General statistics
- Type: Steel – Spinning
- Manufacturer: Mack Rides
- Model: Spinning Coaster
- Lift/launch system: Chain lift hill
- Height: 55 ft (17 m)
- Length: 1,253.3 ft (382.0 m)
- Speed: 40 mph (64 km/h)
- Inversions: 0
- Height restriction: 44 in (112 cm)
- Trains: 2 trains with 3 cars. Riders are arranged 2 across in 2 rows for a total of 12 riders per train.
- Website: Official website
- Turbulence at RCDB

Turbulence is a steel spinning roller coaster at Adventureland in East Farmingdale, New York. The coaster opened in May 2015 and replaced the aging Hurricane coaster, which had operated at the park for 22 years. It is considered as the park's headlining attraction.

== History ==
Development of a new project that would become the Turbulence roller coaster began two years in advance of its opening, in 2013, when park officials visited Knott's Berry Farm in Buena Park, California to ride Sierra Sidewinder - a spinning coaster - before traveling to Germany to consult with ride manufacturer Mack Rides.

On June 25, 2014, Adventureland announced that they would retire their existing Hurricane coaster at the end of the season, to be replaced by a $5 million spinning coaster from Mack Rides, which would be the park's largest and most expensive attraction to date. A contest would also be held to determine the new ride's name. Hurricane, a roller coaster from bankrupt Italian manufacturer S.D.C., gave its final rides on September 13, 2014, after 22 years of operation at the park, Soon after, it was sold to Race City in Panama City Beach, Florida, where it opened for the 2015 season and still operates today. On December 26, 2014, Adventureland announced on social media that the name of the coaster would be Turbulence.

Site preparation had begun after Hurricane was dismantled, and the coaster was constructed throughout the winter of 2014/2015. A March 2015 opening date was originally eyeballed, but tough weather forced significant construction delays, with the coaster being completed in late March. The coaster began conducting test runs and landscape work throughout the spring. Following a media preview on May 18, and a first rider preview earlier in the morning, Turbulence had its grand opening for a widely enthusiastic crowd at 2pm EST on May 22, 2015, with public and local dignitaries at hand for the event.

On August 2, 2017, two years after opening, Turbulence welcomed its one millionth rider, who was awarded with 2017 and 2018 park season passes and a prize pack of ride merchandise.

== Characteristics ==
=== Ride experience ===
The ride begins with a 180° right turn into the lift hill, with the cars locked into a non-spinning position, and climbs to a height of 55 feet (17 m). The song "Turbulence" by Steve Aoki and Laidback Luke is played from the ride's PA systems on the lift hill, although it is all but drowned out by the sounds of the lift mechanism. Once at the top, free spinning mode is enabled and the ride makes a left turn into the ride's main drop, achieving a top speed of 40 mph (64 km/h) and pulling up into a large turnaround. Following an airtime hill, the coaster twists through a low-to-the-ground series of track. A cross-layout figure-8, airtime hill, and helix compose much of this section, with a final tight turn leading the trains to hit the brake run with plenty of momentum to spare. A slight turn leads back into the station/storage track. The entire ride experience from station to brakes lasts about a minute.

=== Statistics ===
Turbulence is 55 feet (17 m) tall, 1,253.3 feet (382.0 m) long, and reaches a top speed of 40 mph (64 km/h). The coaster is roughly 174 feet (53 m) feet shorter than the Hurricane coaster that it replaced, although the layout was customized for the park. The coaster runs a pair of 12-passenger trains, each of which consists of three cars that seat four riders each, in two rows of two. In each car, riders are seated forwards and backwards so that they face the outside of the car, and each freely spins throughout the ride layout. These trains are stored via a stacked storage system instead of the typical transfer track and shed found on most rides capable of running multiple trains. Instead of a switch track into a shed, one train can be stored below the station while the other is stored within the station, and can be lifted up via an elevator lift underneath the platform. This system is fairly rare, and can be found on some of Mack Ride's products (e.g. Sierra Sidewinder) and The Big One at Blackpool Pleasure Beach in Blackpool, England.

=== Model ===
Turbulence is a spinning roller coaster from Mack Rides, and one of three Mack spinners in the United States, the other two being Sierra Sidewinder and the more extreme Time Traveler at Silver Dollar City in Branson, Missouri.

== In popular culture ==
Turbulence made an appearance in the final episode (S4E12) of the acclaimed Netflix sitcom Unbreakable Kimmy Schmidt, posing as the fictional new roller coaster The Grabagorn's Horn at a fictionalized Universal Studios. Filming occurred at Adventureland on June 27, 2018. Turbulence is featured in the Peacock series “Bupkis” by Pete Davidson in season 1 episode 5 titled “For Your Amusement.”
