= Adventure City =

Amusement park in Stanton, California

- Interactive map of Adventure City
- Location: Stanton, California, United States
- Coordinates: 33°48′55″N 117°59′33″W
- Status: Operating
- Opened: 1994
- Operating season: Seasonal
- Area: 2 acres (0.81 ha)

Attractions
- Total: 11
- Roller coasters: 2
- Website: Adventure City

Adventure City is an amusement park in Stanton, California, United States. Occupying an area of just over 2 acres (0.81 ha), Adventure City is one of the smallest theme parks in California, and receives an average attendance of between 200,000 and 400,000 visitors per year. The Coca-Cola Company is the park's only major sponsor.

The park sits on the boundary between Anaheim and Stanton. Though the park advertises itself as being within the city of Anaheim, the physical location of the park is in Stanton while the parking lot and main entrance are in Anaheim.

== History ==
The park opened in 1994 at a cost of $4 million, as an expansion of Hobby City, a nearby 6-acre (2.4 ha) collection of novelty shops and museums. The park was initially marketed to families with children as an affordable alternative to other amusement parks in Greater Los Angeles. Hobby City's original miniature railroad attraction, which opened in 1938 (25 years before the park opened), was extended and incorporated into the new park. A classic 1946 carousel was also part of the park's opening day attractions roster.

In 1998, Adventure City was featured in Big Smile Entertainment's musical adventure film "The Happy Crowd at Adventure City".

In 1999, the park purchased and refurbished a classic 1950s-era Wild Mouse style roller coaster from an amusement company in Brisbane, Australia. The park named the coaster Tree Top Racers, and expanded its boundaries westward into an adjacent former parking area to incorporate the new attraction. The ride was the park's first new attraction since opening, adding to its collection of classic rides. In 2012, Tree Top Racers was permanently closed.

In 2005, the park opened Drop Zone, its second new attraction since opening day, next to Tree Top Racers. In 2015, Rewind Racers, a $2 million family shuttle coaster, opened on the former site of Tree Top Racers in time for the park's 20th anniversary. The ride is a first-of-its-kind attraction in North America, built by Gerstlauer, a German ride manufacturer, and the largest single investment in the park's history.

== Attractions ==
=== Rides ===
- Balloon Race - Spinning balloon ride.
- Barnstormer Planes - Spinning airplane ride.
- Drop Zone - Opened in 2005, a drop tower ride.
- Freeway Coaster - The park's first roller coaster. It was built around a giant pepper tree[8] which formerly existed on the site before the park was built before its removal in 2025.
- Crank 'n' Roll - Kid-powered 'train' ride.
- Adventure City Express Train - A 14-in (356-mm) gauge[9] ridable miniature train ride built in 1938, which was a main attraction at Hobby City for 25 years. It was incorporated into the park when the park was built in 1994.
- Crazy Bus - A bus-themed flat ride.
- Carousel - A vintage 1946 carousel featuring 20 horse figures.
- Giggle Wheel - A mini Ferris wheel.
- Rewind Racers - Opened in 2015. A unique family shuttle coaster and the first of its kind in North America.
- Rescue Ride - 6 individual rescue vehicles that travel around a serpentine track.

=== Other attractions ===
- Stage 39 - Stage area for dance parties and live shows.
- Petting farm
- Thomas and Friends - An area where children can play with toys and train sets from the Thomas and Friends franchise.
- Mount Adventurous - A children's rock climbing tower.
- Arcade

=== Former attractions ===
- Tree Top Racers - Opened in 1999, a 1950s-era vintage Wild Mouse roller coaster. The ride closed in 2012 and was replaced in 2015 by Rewind Racers.
- Children's Theater - Opened in 1994, a theater show with puppets and live actors. The theater closed in 2018 and was replaced by Stage 39.
