= Kings City =

Park in Eilat, Israel

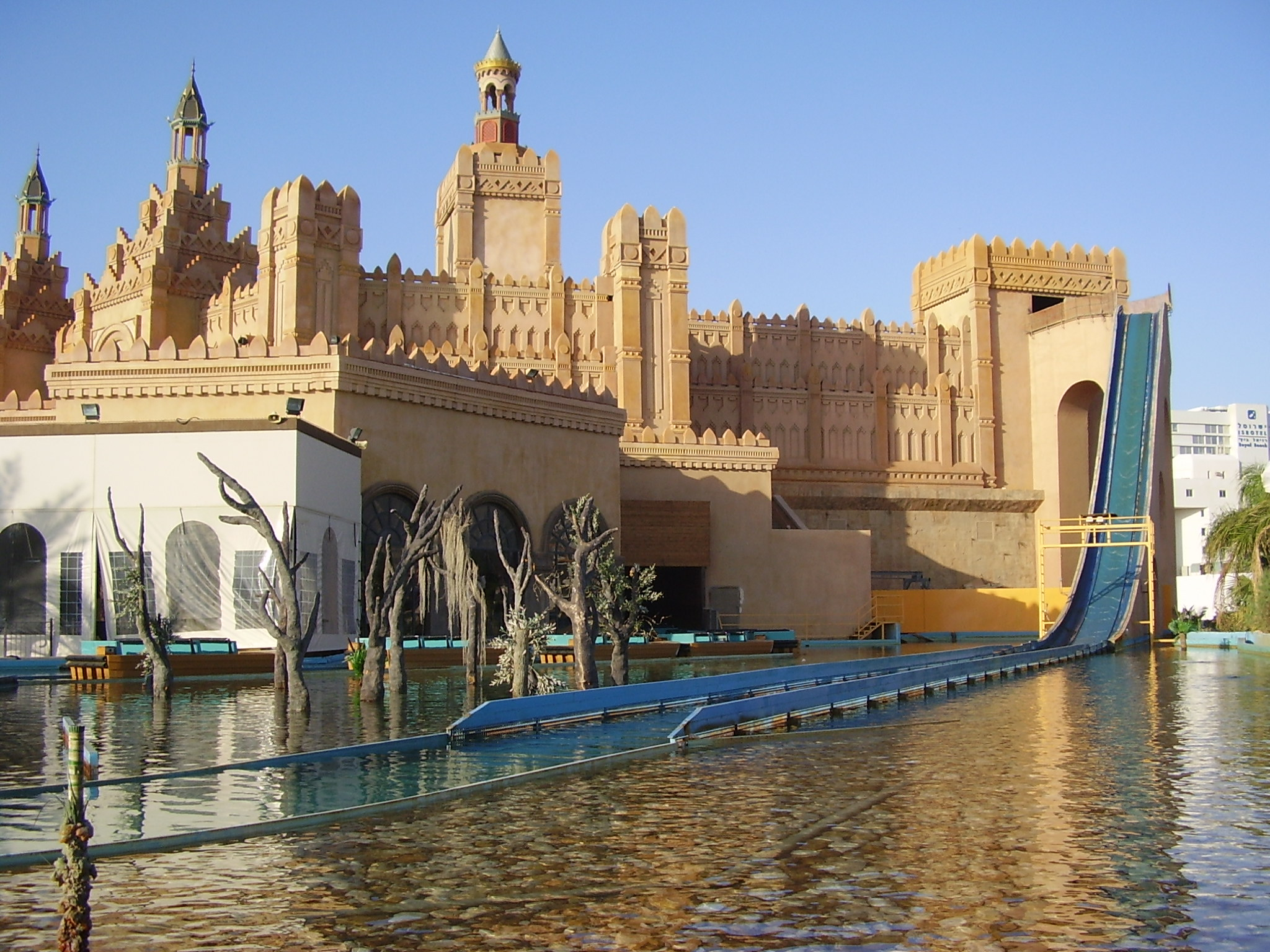
- Interactive map of Kings City
- Location: Eilat, Israel
- Coordinates: 29.5506679°N 34.9665615°E
- Status: Defunct
- Opened: June 2005
- Closed: June 2015

Kings City ("עיר המלכים" in Hebrew) was a biblical theme park in Eilat, Israel, which opened in June 2005. It was owned by Africa Israel, Elran d.d. Real Estate Limited and a Swiss investor. The park could handle 4500 visitors per day. It closed in June 2015.

== Attractions ==
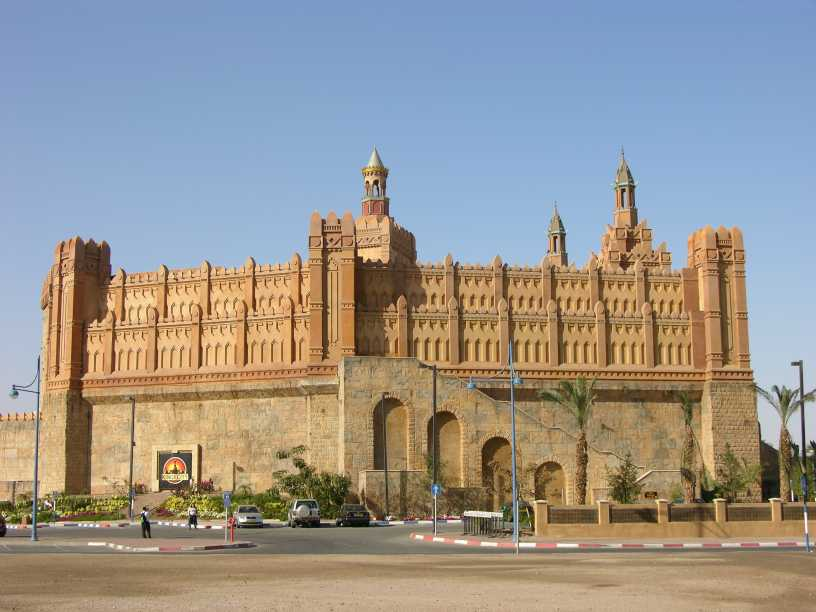
Main view of Kings City

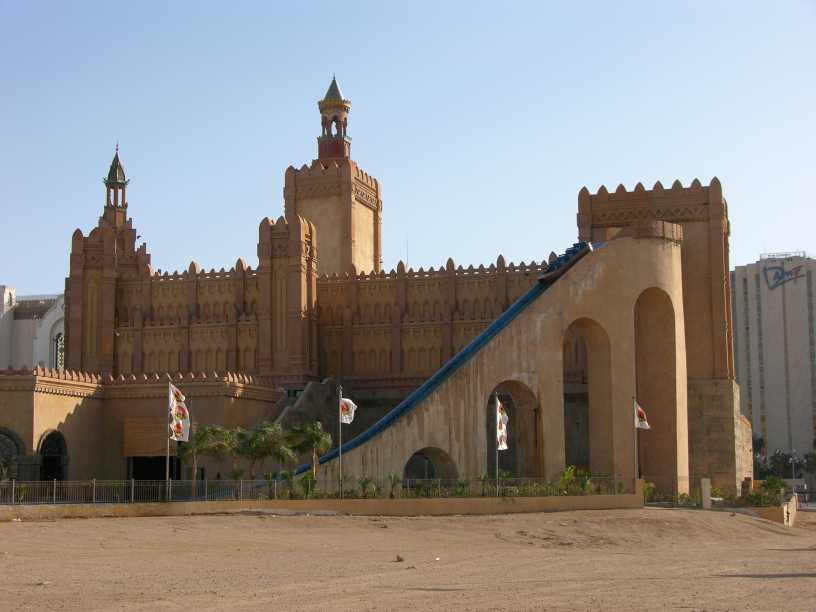
The toboggan ride

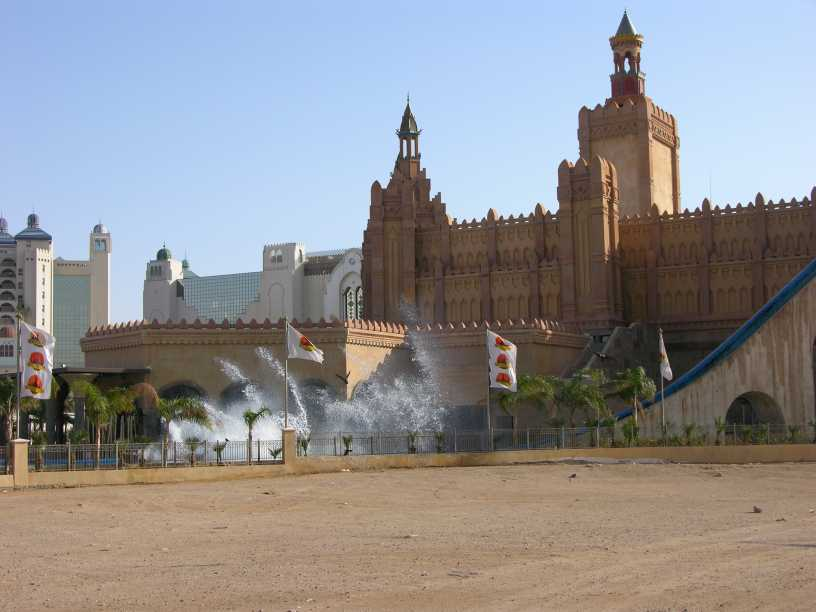
The water at the end of King Solomon's Waterfalls

Built over a 40,000 square feet (3,700 m^{2}) area on three levels, the park was designed to look like a king's palace. The palace has five sections:

=== Journey to the Past ===
The "Journey to the Past" area included four-dimensional panoramic displays of ancient Egyptian palaces and temples.

=== Cave of Illusions and Wisdom ===
This ride was constructed to celebrate and honor King Solomon, and included over 70 displays of optical illusions, labyrinths, self tests and other interactive challenges.

=== Bible Cave ===
The Bible Cave was based on King Solomon's mines, with Bible scenes displayed in niches carved into the walls.

=== King Solomon's Waterfalls ===
The King Solomon's Waterfalls was a boat ride based on the life of King Solomon. Visitors would sail through seven caves, each marking a chapter in the life of King Solomon, and travel down the falls to the King Solomon lake next to his castle. (For safety reasons, the minimum height was 120 cm ).

=== Spiral of David Slide ===
The Spiral of David slide were two dry slides that started from over approximately 66 feet. The sliding speed was up to 31 mph, and the slides ended on the Cave Of Illusions And Wisdom.

== Sources ==
- The Kings City biblical theme park opens in Eilat
- Information from Africa Israel
