= Hershey Lodge =

Hotel and convention center in Pennsylvania, USA

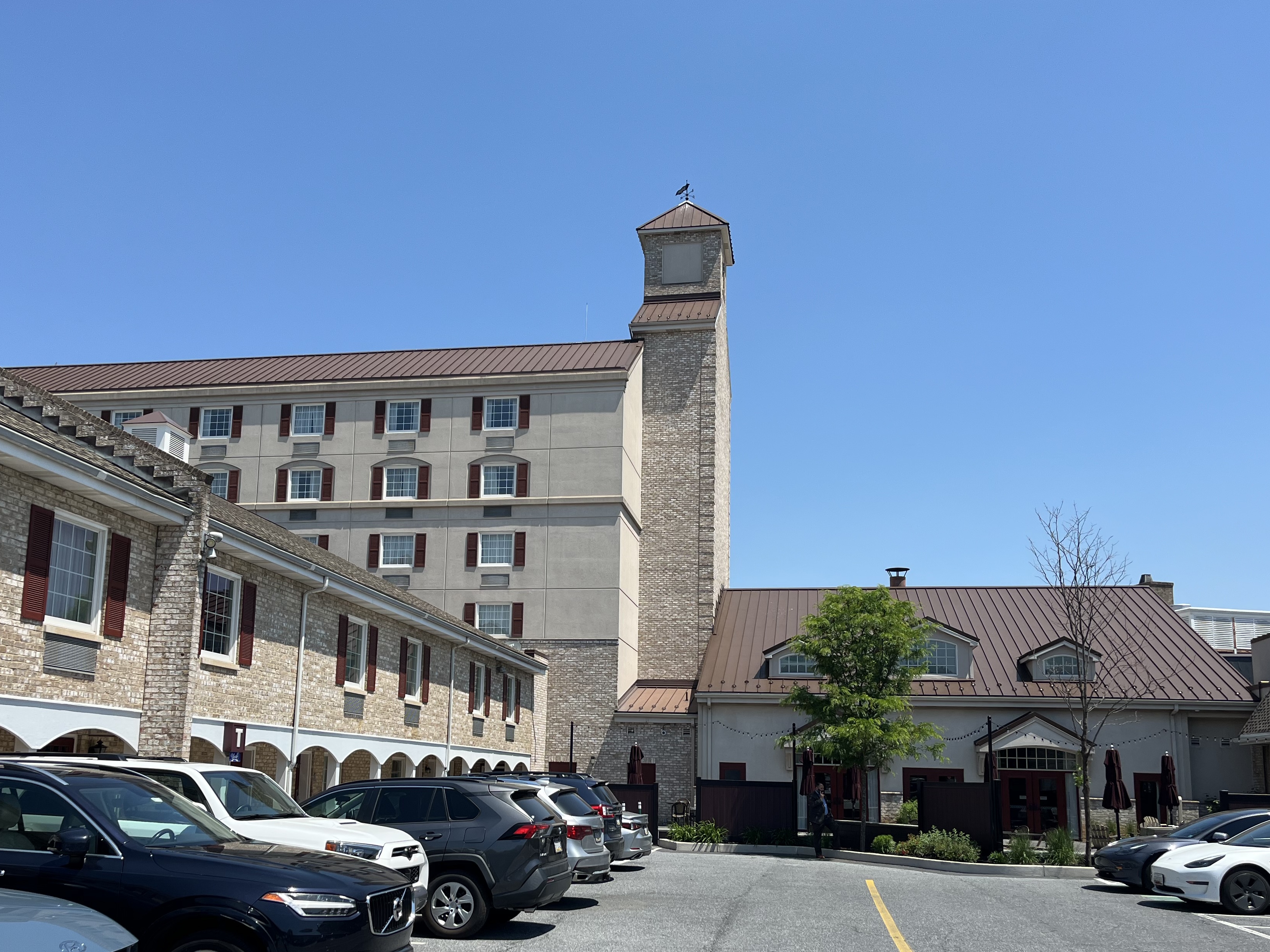
- Exterior of Hershey Lodge in 2026
- Interactive map of Hershey Lodge
- Address: 325 University Drive
- Location: Hershey, Pennsylvania 17033
- Coordinates: 40°16′12″N 76°40′39″W
- Owner: Hershey Entertainment and Resorts
- Operator: Hershey Entertainment and Resorts
- Capacity: Detailed venue capacity: 1,700 (Chocolate Ballroom); 3,500 (Great American Hall)

Construction
- Opened: May 1, 1967

The Hershey Lodge is a hotel and convention center located in Hershey, Pennsylvania. It has 665 guest rooms and 100,000 square feet of function space, divided between two ballrooms and several other large event spaces.

The Lodge is a popular hotel among visitors of Hersheypark due to its shuttles to and from the park and Harrisburg International Airport, bundled admissions to local activities such as the Hershey Gardens, and its comparatively lower price point than the nearby Hotel Hershey.

== History ==
=== Background ===
In the 1950s and 1960s, Hershey experienced a large influx of tourists, and was a popular place for recreation and business. Cocoa Inn and The Hotel Hershey were the two major hotels in Hershey, but could only handle around 350 room nights between the two properties. In 1963, officials of Hershey Trust Company and Penn State University announced that a new large hospital school would be built in Hershey. The location of the hospital would be on the southside of US Route 322, a couple of miles southwest of downtown Hershey. Within a year, plans for a new hotel was in development. The idea was to take the undeveloped land across the street from the future medical center and develop it as apartments and a hotel.

Plans were introduced in March 1965 which outlined the development of a 217 acre parcel of land. It would span the distance between the medical center and the H.B. Reese Candy Company to the north, while spanning from Hockersville in the east and the Sipe Street neighborhood to the west. The apartments were called Derryhillls Apartments (which would later be changed to Briarcrest Apartments), while the hotel was called Hershey Motor Lodge. The plan called for a 350 room hotel, styled in a mid-century modern motel-like motif. Most rooms would have exterior entrances and some rooms would have both interior and exterior entries. The first phase of the Lodge plan was to construct 150 of the 350 rooms.

The property was deeded from Hershey Trust Company / Milton Hershey School to Hershey Entertainment & Resorts Company (then known as Hershey Estates) on June 16, 1965 for $447,134.

Construction of the Lodge began in June 1966. By this time the plan was to construct 205 rooms. The architects were Coleman and Coleman, from Landisville, Pennsylvania. Interior design was planned by Walter M. Ballard Company of New York. The property was slated to debut on April 1, 1967. By the beginning of 1967, that slipped to May 1967. In February 1967, advertisements began appearing in local newspapers featuring employment opportunities at Hershey Lodge including maids, housemen, and bellmen.

David G. Browne was named the first general manager of Hershey Lodge. He was general manager of Cocoa Inn, Hershey's original hotel. The Cocoa Inn's symbol, a lamppost, became the Lodge's logo as well, which remained in place for many years.

=== Motor Lodge opens ===
The Lodge opened on May 1, 1967, with 202 guest rooms. The first guest to check in was John E. Parker, Director of the Department of Medical Illustrations at Hershey Medical Center. Parker worked for University of Minnesota at the time. The Lodge had a soft open, with the restaurant, called The Hearth, not opening until July 1.

The formal opening ceremony of Hershey Lodge occurred on July 11, 1967. The ribbon cutting ceremony was attended by 200 persons, including Arthur Whiteman, president of Hershey Estates, James E. Bobb, vice president of Hershey Estates, David Browne, manager of Hershey Lodge, John K. Tabor, Pennsylvania Secretary of Internal Affairs, and Doris Ann Lausch, Miss Pennsylvania of 1967. Lausch was the honoree to cut the ribbon and was assisted by the other officials. Following the ceremony, a lunch buffet was served in the Chocolate Ballroom.

== Notable events ==
=== Inauguration of governors ===
The Hershey Lodge has a history of hosting inaugural celebrations for multiple Governors of Pennsylvania, from both major political parties, including Republican governor Tom Ridge and Democratic Governor Tom Wolf.

=== AACA Eastern Fall meet ===
The Antique Automobile Club of America hosts its annual Eastern Fall Meet, the largest antique car show in the United States, in Hershey. The Hershey Lodge is one of several sites used by the club during the event, and is notably the location of its awards ceremony.
