= Bilbrey =

Bilbrey is a surname. Notable people with the surname include:

- Jim Bilbrey (1924–1985), American baseball player
- John Bilbrey, American business executive
- Keith Bilbrey (born 1952), American country music disc jockey and television host
