= Hockersville, Pennsylvania =

Unincorporated community in Pennsylvania, U.S.

Coordinates: 40.263°N 76.652°W

Hockersville
- Unincorporated community / Neighborhood within Hershey
- Location in Pennsylvania, United States
- Country: United States
- State: Pennsylvania
- County: Dauphin
- Township: Derry
- Community: Hershey
- Time zone: UTC-5 (Eastern)
  - Summer (DST): UTC-4 (EDT)
- ZIP code: 17033
- Area code: 717

Hockersville is an unincorporated community in Derry Township, Dauphin County, Pennsylvania, United States, and is a part of the Harrisburg-Carlisle Metropolitan Statistical Area. It is incorporated into the boundaries of Hershey, Pennsylvania.
