= Ted J. Kleisner =

Theodore J. Kleisner is the former chairman and chief executive officer of Hershey Entertainment & Resorts located in Hershey, Pennsylvania. He was given the title on January 1, 2007 after the retirement of former CEO, Scott J. Newkam. He was previously president and CEO of CSX Hotels.
