= Hershey Center =

Hershey Center or Hershey Centre could mean:

- Hershey Centre, an indoor arena now known as the Mississauga Sports and Entertainment Centre, in Mississauga, Ontario, Canada
- Hershey Center for Applied Research, a research park in Hershey, Pennsylvania, United States
