= Swatara =

Swatara may refer to:

== Communities ==
- Swatara, Minnesota, an unincorporated community in Aitkin County
- Lower Swatara Township, Pennsylvania
- Swatara Township, Dauphin County, Pennsylvania
- Swatara Township, Lebanon County, Pennsylvania
- Swatara, Derry Township, Pennsylvania, an unincorporated community in Dauphin County

== Streams ==
- Swatara Creek, a tributary of the Susquehanna River in Pennsylvania
  - Little Swatara Creek, a tributary of the above

== Ships ==
- USS Swatara (1865), a wooden, screw sloop, launched in 1865, dismantled in 1872
- USS Swatara (1872), a screw sloop, launched in 1873, decommissioned in 1891

== Other ==
- Swatara State Park, in Pennsylvania
