= Swatara, Derry Township, Pennsylvania =

Unincorporated community in Pennsylvania, U.S.

Coordinates: 40.277°N 76.666°W

Swatara is an unincorporated community in Derry Township, Dauphin County, Pennsylvania, United States, located near Hershey in the Harrisburg–Carlisle metropolitan statistical area.

The community is also known as Swatara Station and is the site of the historic Curry & Sons Mill, built in 1858.
