= Oakmont, Dauphin County, Pennsylvania =

Unincorporated community in Pennsylvania, U.S.

Coordinates: 40.252°N 76.690°W

Oakmont is an unincorporated community in Derry Township, Dauphin County, Pennsylvania. It is a part of the Harrisburg–Carlisle metropolitan statistical area.
