= Hershey Theatre =

Theater in Hershey, Pennsylvania

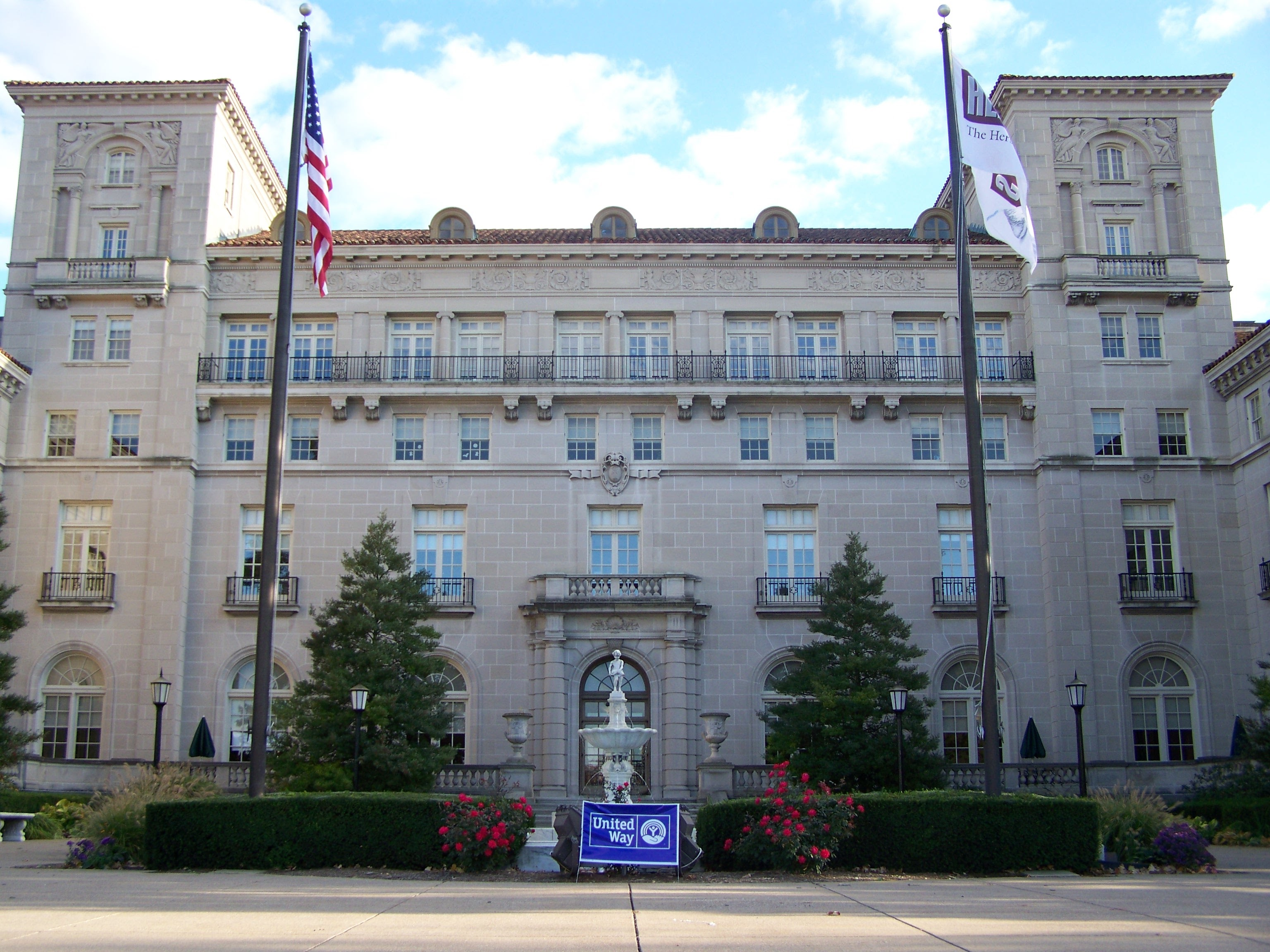
- Hershey Theatre building in October 2008
- Interactive map of Hershey Theatre
- Address: 15 E. Caracas Avenue; Hershey, Pennsylvania; United States
- Owner: Hershey Entertainment and Resorts Company
- Capacity: 1,904

Construction
- Opened: September 1933; 92 years ago
- Architect: C. Emlen Urban

Website
- www.hersheyentertainment.com/hershey-theatre/

Hershey Theatre is a 1,904-seat theater in downtown Hershey, Pennsylvania. Touring Broadway musicals, concerts, community performances, and dance groups perform at the theater.

The Hershey Theatre is also home to the Hershey Theatre Apollo Awards, which recognizes outstanding high school students in theater and awards scholarships.

== History ==
C. Emlen Urban began planning the building of the Hershey Theatre as a community center in 1915 for chocolate magnate and philanthropist Milton S. Hershey. Milton Hershey began construction of Hershey Theatre in 1929 during the Great Depression. The construction of the theater and five other buildings in Hershey, Pennsylvania gave hundreds of workers jobs during the financial crisis.

The Hershey Theatre was opened in September, 1933, as part of Hershey's Great Building Campaign of the Depression. At its opening, the theater was also used as a movie theater, and the original projectors are still used for classic screenings.

== Design ==
The lobby of the theater is inspired by St. Mark's Cathedral in Venice. Its "canopy of gold" and pin-point mosaic took German artisans two years to complete.

The theater itself is inspired by Byzantine and Venetian themes. The wooden sides of the auditorium are inspired by Byzantine castle architecture, while the proscenium arch and winged lion statues are inspired by Venetian culture. Behind the fire curtain, there is a water color painting of the Grand Canal and Doge's Palace in Venice. Eighty-eight small light bulbs hang from the ceiling, giving the appearance of stars in the night sky.

The stage is seventy-five feet by forty-four feet and has five elevators. The theater has forty-four lines for sets and lights and a house sound system. It also features five floors of dressing rooms for performers.

The theater features a four-manual, seventy-eight-rank concert organ, made by Aeolian-Skinner. It was commissioned by Milton S. Hershey and has over four thousand pipes, the largest more than thirty feet tall.
