= Life Sciences Greenhouse of Central Pennsylvania =

Biotechnology initiative and non-profit organization

- Abbreviation: LSGPA
- Formation: 2001
- Type: Non-profit organization
- Purpose: Life sciences; Biotechnology
- Location: Harrisburg, Pennsylvania, Philadelphia

Life Sciences Greenhouse of Central Pennsylvania (LSGPA) is a biotechnology initiative and non-profit organization based in Harrisburg, Pennsylvania. It was founded in 2001. It focuses on in the advancement of life sciences through technology to improve the healthcare and economic opportunities of Pennsylvanians.

== Background ==
The initiative began in 2001, funded from the state's settlement with the tobacco industry. Other life sciences greenhouses in Philadelphia and Pittsburgh also received seed money from the settlement. LSGPA partners with a range of institutions, including local research universities, colleges, medical centers, economic development agencies and companies of various sizes to identify needs and opportunities. It then works to help transfer technologies, develop new companies, provide support for existing companies (particularly those seeking to expand or relocate), and ensure that the infrastructure to support a thriving life sciences industry keeps pace with development.

== Research areas ==
Central Pennsylvania has three large research universities which contribute to the initiative. Collectively, these three institutions attract more than $600 million in sponsored research funding annually. They are:

- Lehigh University, located in Bethlehem, Pennsylvania
- Penn State University, located in State College, Pennsylvania
- Penn State Hershey Medical Center, located in Hershey, Pennsylvania
