= Hershey Center for Applied Research =

Research park in Hershey, Pennsylvania

Coordinates: 40.26269°N 76.68628°W

The Hershey Center for Applied Research (HCAR) is a research park located in Hershey, Pennsylvania that offers life sciences and high technology companies at all phases of the business lifecycle state-of-the-art wet and dry lab facilities and office space, as well as access to capital, business support services, and shared amenities. The first building of the research park was completed April 27, 2007 and is 80,000 square feet (7,400 m^{2}). The campus is master planned to include up to 12 similar buildings.

The campus is located adjacent to the Penn State Milton S.Hershey Medical Center and College of Medicine, an academic medical institution that is undertaking approximately $100 million annually in research. In fact, although no formal relationship exists between HCAR and Penn State University, the Penn State College of Medicine's Department of Pharmacology and the Penn State College of Medicine's Technology Development Office are the anchor tenants of Building One.

The research park is a project of Maryland-based real estate development firm, Wexford Science & Technology. Supporting organizations include the Harrisburg Regional Chamber and the Capital Regional Economic Development Corp., and the Life Sciences Greenhouse of Central Pennsylvania, an organization that was formed to provide start-up money and business support services to early-stage life sciences companies. The land on which HCAR is built is in the heart of the Harrisburg Market Keystone Innovation Zone and is owned by Hershey Trust Company as Trustee for the Milton Hershey School.
