= Hershey Entertainment and Resorts Company =

American entertainment company

Hershey Entertainment & Resorts Company
- Formerly: Hershey Estates (1927–1976); HERCO, Inc. (1976–1998)
- Type: Private
- Industry: Entertainment and hospitality
- Founded: October 31, 1927; 99 years ago
- Founder: Milton S. Hershey
- Headquarters: Hershey, Pennsylvania, U.S.
- Key people: List: Directors: Jane Cooper Sheila E. Dow-Ford Richard A. Harvey Eric Henry Jeffrey W. Jones Joseph M. Senser Executive Officers: John Lawn (CEO) David P. Lavery (CFO) Garrett Gallia (VP) Andrew Helmer (VP) Jane LaFranchi (VP) Leslie Ferraro (VP)
- Brands: Hersheypark; The Hotel Hershey
- Services: Amusement park, attractions, hotels, restaurants, meetings
- Owner: Hershey Trust Company
- Website: hersheyentertainmentandresorts.com

Hershey Entertainment and Resorts Company is a privately held company based in the U.S. state of Pennsylvania. Milton S. Hershey established HE&R in 1927 to distinguish and separate his chocolate manufacturing company from his other business ventures. All of his non-chocolate producing businesses were established as Hershey Estates, renamed HERCO, Inc. in 1976 and Hershey Entertainment and Resorts Company in 1998.

== History ==
=== Predecessors ===
In 1894, Milton S. Hershey founded the Hershey Chocolate Company as a subsidiary of his Lancaster Caramel Company. In 1900, the American Caramel Company offered to purchase the Lancaster Caramel Company for $1 million. Hershey accepted the offer, maintaining ownership of the Hershey Chocolate Company. In 1903, Hershey began purchasing land in Derry Township, Pennsylvania, not far from the family homestead he owned, to create a company town for his proposed chocolate factory. To build the structures of the town, Hershey created a subsidiary company called the Hershey Improvement Company. This company was the predecessor to Hershey Entertainment and Resorts. After the factory was completed and put in operation in 1904, the Hershey Improvement Company turned toward building the town, which included homes, stores and parks. Hershey Park was opened on May 30, 1906, with a dance hall pavilion, band shell for shows, tennis courts and a baseball field with a grand stand available for sporting events. As the park gained popularity, further improvements were made, such as a grand entrance for the park in 1916.

In 1905, Hershey created the Hershey Trust Company to provide banking to the town of Hershey. In 1909, Hershey and his wife Catherine, who were unable to have children, established the Hershey Industrial School for orphan boys (renamed the Milton Hershey School in 1951). Hershey created a deed of trust establishing a trust fund for the school. He named the Hershey Trust Company as administrator of the school trust. In 1918, three years after Catherine Hershey died, Hershey transferred nearly all of his assets, including his control of the chocolate company, and various other entities, to the school. This made the Hershey Trust Company owner of the Hershey Improvement Company.

In 1920, Hershey experienced financial difficulty following the collapse in sugar futures. Hershey was forced to sign a promissory note from National City Bank to keep the chocolate company in business. Under the terms of the note, National City Bank sent R.J. DeCamp to be on the board of managers, to assume management of the company. DeCamp remained on the board until 1922, when the company settled the debt. During that time period, DeCamp prevented substantial improvements to the park or the town, as it was considered too costly an investment. Once Hershey regained control of the company, this made him realize that he should split his operations such that if the chocolate company ever failed again as it had, it wouldn't directly impact the town as the DeCamp period had.

=== Hershey Estates established ===
In 1927, the Hershey Chocolate Company was reorganized and divided into several independent entities under the ownership of Hershey Trust Company. The chocolate company was incorporated and renamed Hershey Chocolate Corporation (today known as The Hershey Company) on October 24. (A prior company called Hershey Chocolate Corporation existed in the early 1920s when National City Bank took control of Hershey Chocolate Company.) On October 30, the company became a publicly traded company on the New York Stock Exchange. The Cuban businesses held within the chocolate company were spun out into a wholly privately owned company called Hershey Corporation. The Hershey Industrial School remained a separate interest.

All of Hershey's other non-chocolate business endeavors were incorporated into a separate entity known as Hershey Estates. The company was established on October 31, 1927, in Lebanon, Pennsylvania, with paperwork submitted on October 28. Milton S. Hershey owned 47 of the 50 shares in the company, and Ezra F. Hershey, John E. Snyder, and William F.R. Murrie each owned one share. A share was valued at $100, for a total capital stock of $5,000. On October 31, Hershey Estates elected to increase its capital stock from $5,000 to $50,000 and 46 of Hershey's shares were transferred to Murrie under Hershey Chocolate Company. The increase was issued for property.

On November 12, Hershey Chocolate Company sold the property designated for Hershey Estates to the company for one dollar. On December 12, Hershey Estates relocated from Lebanon to Hershey. On December 20, Hershey Chocolate Company filed notice to the Dauphin County prothonotary's office and the Secretary of the Commonwealth's office that they were no longer connected in the operation of various companies including Hersheypark and Hershey Laundry. This formally separated operations between Hershey Estates properties and Hershey Chocolate Company operations.

=== Company growth 1930s-1970s ===
In 1933, The Hotel Hershey opened, becoming Hershey Estate's second hotel in Hershey. Hershey Estates was a conglomeration, having ownership of such things as a bakery, electric company, creamery, sports arena, air park, amusement park, and lumber yard. The Estates company maintained this kind of control until the 1960s, when they began selling off public works companies such as the electric company, gave control of the roads they owned to Derry Township, and began closing poor performing divisions. In 1971, Hershey Estates began a large renovation project for Hershey Park, involving new rides, a gate around the park, live acts, and other kinds of entertainment. The park was also renamed Hersheypark.

=== Herco / Hershey Entertainment & Resorts ===
In 1976, the company changed its name from Hershey Estates to Herco, Inc., because of public perception that Hershey Estates referred to land that Milton Hershey once owned. The new name was found to be confusing, so Herco began doing business as Hershey Entertainment & Resort Co. in 1980. Herco formally changed its name to Hershey Entertainment & Resorts in 1998.

Between 1980 and 1987, HE&R began expanding their presence to hotels in the Pocono Mountains, Philadelphia and Corpus Christi, Texas, as well as purchasing Lake Compounce in Bristol and Southington, Connecticut. However, economic and political circumstances caused the Philadelphia and Corpus Christi hotels to struggle substantially. This caused HE&R to experience severe financial difficulties, leading to the promotion of J. Bruce McKinney as CEO of the company. One of his first significant decisions was the controversial move to sell Hershey Lake Compounce.

Ultimately, McKinney successfully led the company back to financial stability, which led to substantial growth within Hersheypark and at the Hershey Lodge in the mid and late 1990s. McKinney retired in 2000 and was replaced by Scott Newkam.

In 2005, HE&R completed renovations of the historic Hershey Press Building in downtown Hershey and moved its headquarters into the building.

Newkam served as CEO of HE&R until 2006, when Newkam was replaced by Ted Kleisner. On January 1, 2013, William F. Simpson Jr. replaced Kleisner as the CEO of Hershey Entertainment and Resorts. John Lawn succeeded Simpson as chief executive on June 14, 2017.

== Company divisions ==
There are two main divisions of the Hershey Entertainment and Resorts Company: Hershey Entertainment Group and the Hershey Resorts Group.

=== Hershey Entertainment Group ===
- Hersheypark
- Hersheypark Arena
- Hersheypark Stadium
- Giant Center (owned by Derry Township Industrial and Commercial Development Authority and managed by Hershey Entertainment Group)
- ZooAmerica North American Wildlife Park
- The Star Pavilion at Hersheypark Stadium
- Hershey Theatre
- Hershey Bears Hockey Club (hockey organization)
  - Hershey Bears (team in the American Hockey League)
- Hershey Nursery
- Hershey Laundry

=== Hershey Resorts Group ===
- Hotel Hershey
  - The Spa at The Hotel Hershey
  - The Jeweler at The Hotel Hershey
  - Circular Dining Room - Fine American Contemporary Cuisine
  - Iberian Lounge
  - Trevi 5 - Authentically Modern Italian Grill
  - Harvest - Genuine American Cuisine
- Hershey Lodge
  - The Bear's Den - Casual Sports-themed restaurant
  - Stacks - Breakfast
  - Fire & Grain - Innovative breakfast and dinner menu of re-mastered comfort foods and cocktails.
  - Revelry Steakhouse - Premium steaks, seafood and pasta served in a cozy loft setting
- Hershey Country Club
- Hersheypark Camping Resort
- Cocoa Beanery - Specialty coffees, lattes, cappuccinos, pastries and lunch items

=== Restaurant Group ===
- Hershey Social (formerly Houlihans)
- Devon Seafood + Steak (Hershey location)
- Chocolatier (outside Hersheypark)

== See also ==
- "Hershey Lake Compounce" phase of Lake Compounce amusement park
- Dutch Wonderland Family Amusement Park
