= Michele Buck =

American businesswoman

- Born: 1961 (age 64–65); Pennsylvania
- Education: Shippensburg University of Pennsylvania (BSBA), University of North Carolina at Chapel Hill (MBA)
- Occupation: Businesswoman
- Employer: The Hershey Company
- Title: Chairman, President, and CEO
- Term: 2017-present
- Predecessor: John Bilbrey

Michele G. Buck (born 1960 or 1961) is an American businesswoman. In March 2017, she became the first female Chairman, President, and CEO of The Hershey Company, an American food manufacturing company, replacing former CEO John Bilbrey.

== Early life and education ==
A native of central Pennsylvania, Buck earned a bachelor's degree at Shippensburg University of Pennsylvania and received a Master of Business Administration degree from the University of North Carolina at Chapel Hill in 1987.

== Career ==
Before joining Hershey in 2005, Buck worked for 17 years at Kraft/Nabisco, holding several senior positions including Senior Vice President and General Manager for Kraft Confections, as well as senior positions at the Frito-Lay division of PepsiCo.

At Hershey, Buck spearheaded the acquisition of Krave Beef Jerky, acquired by Hershey in 2015, and barkThins, a healthy chocolate brand acquired in 2016. Prior to her appointment as CEO, Buck served as Chief Operating Officer for Hershey, where she led the company's day-to-day operations in North America as well as operations in Central and South America. In December 2016, it was announced that she was to succeed John Bilbrey as chief executive officer of the company.

In 2017, Hershey announced its first acquisition under Buck, a $1.6 billion deal to purchase Amplify Snack Brands, further diversifying Hershey's holdings in the healthy snack category. It is the largest deal to date in the history of The Hershey Company.

Buck currently serves on the board of directors at New York Life, and as a Benefit Co-Chair for the Children's Brain Tumor Foundation.

In October 2019, Buck was elected chairman of the board of directors at The Hershey Company.

She was ranked 73rd on Fortune's list of Most Powerful Women in 2023.

In 2023, Buck's total compensation at Hershey was $15.6 million, or 360 times the median employee pay at Hershey for that year.

Buck was named to the JPMorgan Chase board of directors in December 2024, effective March 2025.

In January 2025, Buck announced her plans to retire in June 2026.
