= Derry Township, Dauphin County, Pennsylvania =

Township in Pennsylvania, US

Derry Township, Pennsylvania
- Township
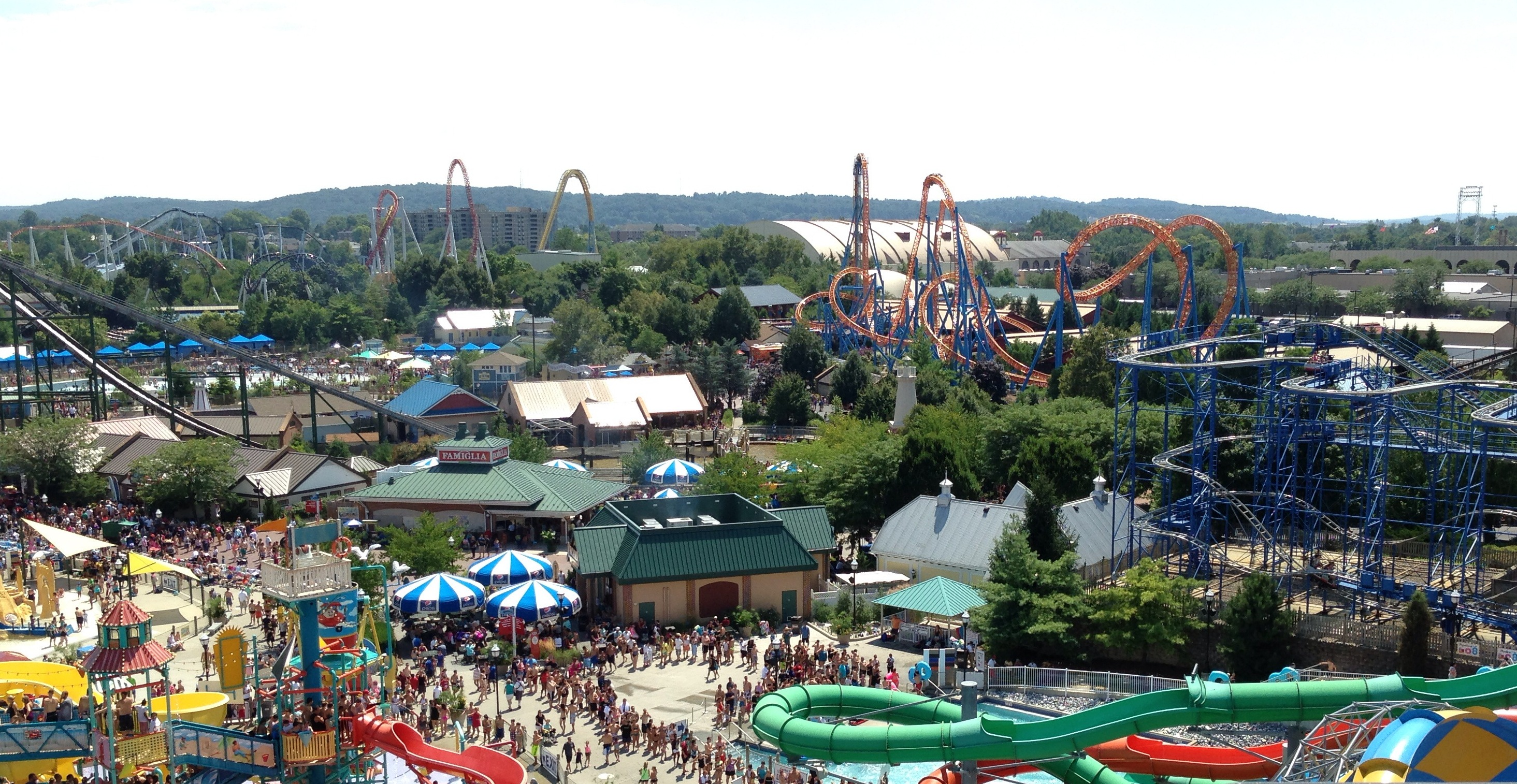
- Overview of Hersheypark

- Flag Seal Logo
- Motto: "Where It's Just Sweeter"
- Location in Dauphin County and the U.S. state of Pennsylvania.

- Location within Pennsylvania Location within the United States
- Coordinates: 40°16′N 76°38′W
- Country: United States
- State: Pennsylvania
- County: Dauphin
- Settled: 1717
- Incorporated: 1729

Government
  - Type: Board of Commissioners

Area
  - Total: 27.40 sq mi (70.96 km^{2})
  - Land: 27.20 sq mi (70.45 km^{2})
  - Water: 0.19 sq mi (0.50 km^{2})

Population (2020)
  - Total: 24,717 ▲
  - Estimate (2023): 24,944
  - Density: 919.9/sq mi (355.19/km^{2})
- Time zone: UTC-5 (Eastern (EST))
  - Summer (DST): UTC-4 (EDT)
- Area code: 717
- FIPS code: 42-043-18936
- Website: www.derrytownship.org

Derry Township is a township in Dauphin County, Pennsylvania, United States. The population was 24,717 at the 2020 census, an increase over the figure of 24,679 tabulated in 2010. Hershey, the site of the well-known Hershey's chocolate factory and its affiliated amusement park, is located within the township. Pennsylvania State University's Milton S. Hershey Medical Center and the Penn State Hershey Children's Hospital are also located on a large tract of land in the township.

== History ==
The earliest recorded information about the Derry Township area dates back to 1608, when Captain John Smith explored the region. Leaving Jamestown to search for much-needed food, Smith's journey through the Chesapeake Bay region covered an estimated 3,000 miles.

The Township of Derry was incorporated on August 1, 1729, by John, Thomas, and Richard Penn, the sons of William Penn and Proprietors of Pennsylvania. They established Derry Township, along with other townships, to partition Lancaster County's territory for tax purposes. Lancaster County itself had been created earlier that same year.

At that time, the boundaries of Derry Township were much larger and included what are currently three other townships within Lancaster County and Dauphin County (which included Lebanon County). The township's boundaries extended from the mouth of the Conewago to the mouth of the Swatara in the west, then to the mouth of the Quittapahilla in the north, south in a straight line to the Conewago, and west along the river back to the starting point.

The first official government in Derry Township was established in 1759. Five officials were elected for one-year terms. The number of elected officials in Derry remains five, although the terms are now six years.

In 1767 the court ordered the division of Derry Township, the eastern section to remain Derry and the western to be Londonderry Township.

Derry and Londonderry became a part of Dauphin County when it was established in 1785. In 1787, the township's population was 198. Conewago Township was created in 1850 from southern parts of Derry Township and eastern parts of Londonderry Township.

In 2002, amid efforts to fight a potential sale of Hershey and move out of the township, Derry Township supervisors proposed to rename the municipality to "Hershey Township," after the largest and most well-known community in it. Voters rejected the name change in a township referendum, with 54 percent opposed.

The Derry Session House and Enclosure and Quarries of the Hummelstown Brownstone Company are listed on the National Register of Historic Places.

== Geography ==
Derry Township is located in southeastern Dauphin County, bordered to the east by Lebanon County. Swatara Creek forms the northwest border of the township, except where the border is with the borough of Hummelstown. The unincorporated community of Hershey occupies the center, northern, and much of the eastern part of the township, and Palmdale is in the northeastern part of the township. Both Hershey and Palmdale are census-designated places (CDPs). Swatara and Hockersville are unincorporated communities within the western and southern parts, respectively, of the Hershey CDP. Oakmont is near the intersection of Waltonville and Wood Roads, Waltonville is in the southern part of the township, and Stoverdale and Clifton is partially in the southwest corner.

According to the United States Census Bureau, Derry Township has a total area of 27.4 square miles (71.0 km^{2}), of which 27.2 square miles (70.5 km^{2}) is land and 0.2 square miles (0.5 km^{2}), or 0.71%, is water. Derry has a hot-summer humid continental climate (Dfa) and the hardiness zones are 6b and 7a. Average monthly temperatures in Hershey range from 30.1 °F in January to 74.8 °F in July.

== Demographics ==
Historical population
Census	Pop.	Note	%±
1940	8,653		—
1950	9,993		15.5%
1960	12,388		24.0%
1970	15,452		24.7%
1980	18,115		17.2%
1990	18,408		1.6%
2000	21,273		15.6%
2010	24,679		16.0%
2020	24,717		0.2%
2023 (est.)	24,944		0.9%
U.S. Decennial Census

As of the census of 2000, there were 21,273 people, 8,861 households, and 5,688 families residing in the township. The population density was 784.0 inhabitants per square mile (302.7/km^{2}). There were 9,481 housing units at an average density of 349.4 per square mile (134.9/km^{2}). The racial makeup of the township was 92.65% White, 1.67% African American, 0.07% Native American, 3.96% Asian, 0.02% Pacific Islander, 0.43% from other races, and 1.19% from two or more races. Hispanic or Latino of any race were 1.40% of the population.

There were 8,861 households, out of which 28.5% had children under the age of 18 living with them, 54.6% were married couples living together, 7.0% had a female householder with no husband present, and 35.8% were non-families. 30.4% of all households were made up of individuals, and 12.6% had someone living alone who was 65 years of age or older. The average household size was 2.32 and the average family size was 2.92.

In the township the population was spread out, with 22.9% under the age of 18, 6.3% from 18 to 24, 28.9% from 25 to 44, 23.5% from 45 to 64, and 18.4% who were 65 years of age or older. The median age was 40 years. For every 100 females, there were 89.6 males. For every 100 females age 18 and over, there were 85.6 males.

The median income for a household in the township was $52,290, and the median income for a family was $68,838. Males had a median income of $48,510 versus $32,430 for females. The per capita income for the township was $31,365. About 2.8% of families and 4.7% of the population were below the poverty line, including 4.1% of those under age 18 and 4.2% of those age 65 or over.

== Government ==
Derry Township has its own public works department; public library, the Hershey Public Library; and its own police force, the Derry Township Police Department. Derry Township is also home to Hershey Entertainment and Resorts Company (HERCO) which owns Hersheypark and other tourist attractions.

== Notable people ==
- Milton S. Hershey, founder of The Hershey Company and the town of Hershey
- H.B. Reese, inventor of Reese's Peanut Butter Cups
