= Derry Session House and Enclosure =

- U.S. National Register of Historic Places
- Pennsylvania state historical marker
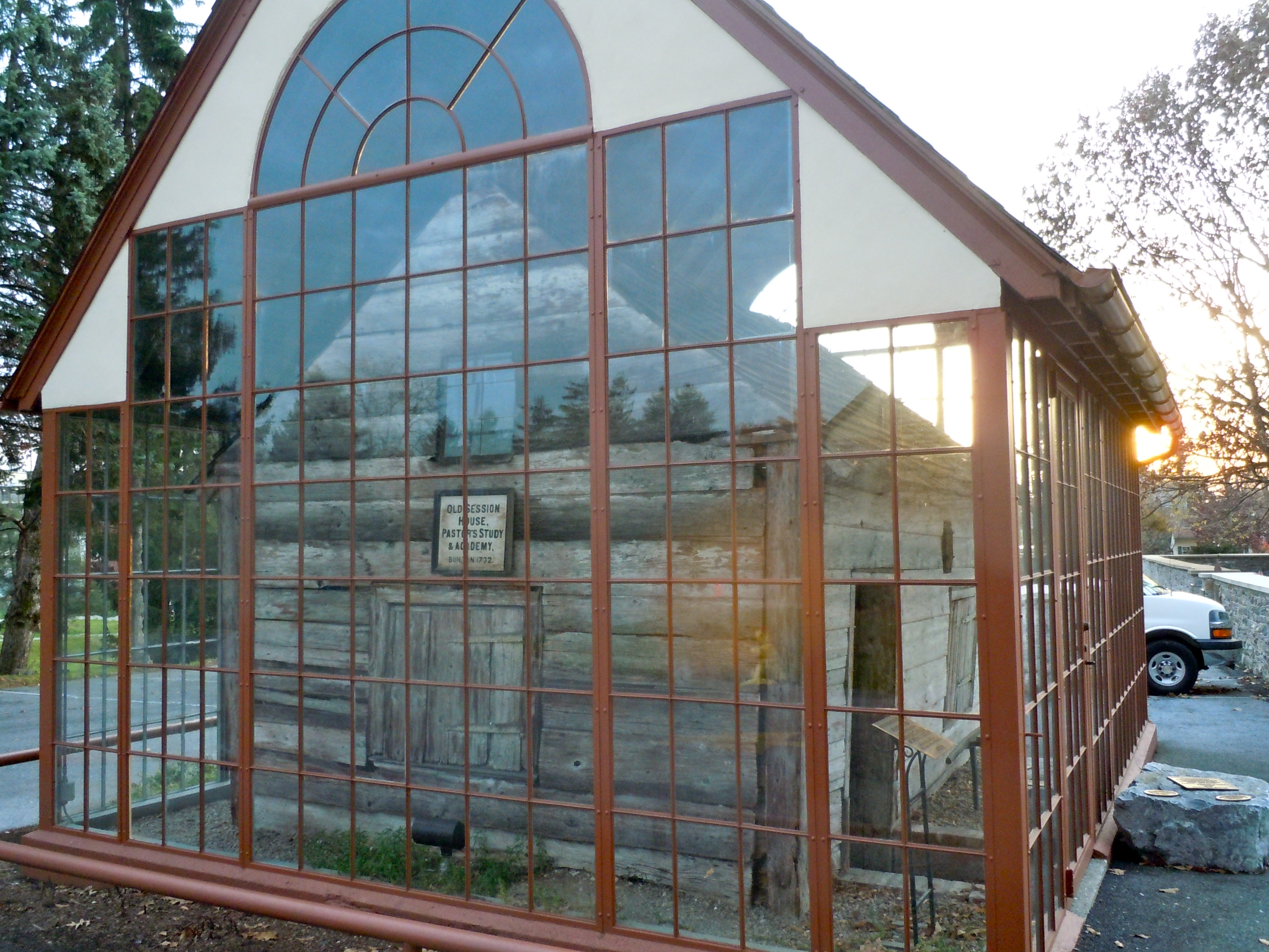
- Derry Session House and Enclosure, November 2011

- Location within Pennsylvania Location within the United States
- Location: 248 E. Derry Rd., Derry Township, Pennsylvania
- Coordinates: 40°17′37″N 76°38′44″W
- Area: less than one acre
- Built: 1732, 1929
- Architect: D. Paul Witmer
- Architectural style: Late Gothic Revival
- NRHP reference No.: 06001061

Significant dates
- Added to NRHP: November 21, 2006
- Designated PHMC: February 28, 1948

Derry Session House and Enclosure is a historic site located on the grounds of Derry Presbyterian Church at Derry Township, Dauphin County, Pennsylvania, United States. It consists of the log Session House, built about 1732, and a glass enclosure, erected in 1929. The hewn log Session House measures 18 feet by 13 feet and is one story high and was built for a Presbyterian session. The glass and steel enclosure measures approximately 24 feet by 19 feet, 6 inches, and sits on a reinforced concrete foundation. The Enclosure, whose construction was originally funded by Milton S. Hershey, was refurbished in 1999.

It was added to the National Register of Historic Places in 2006.

External videos
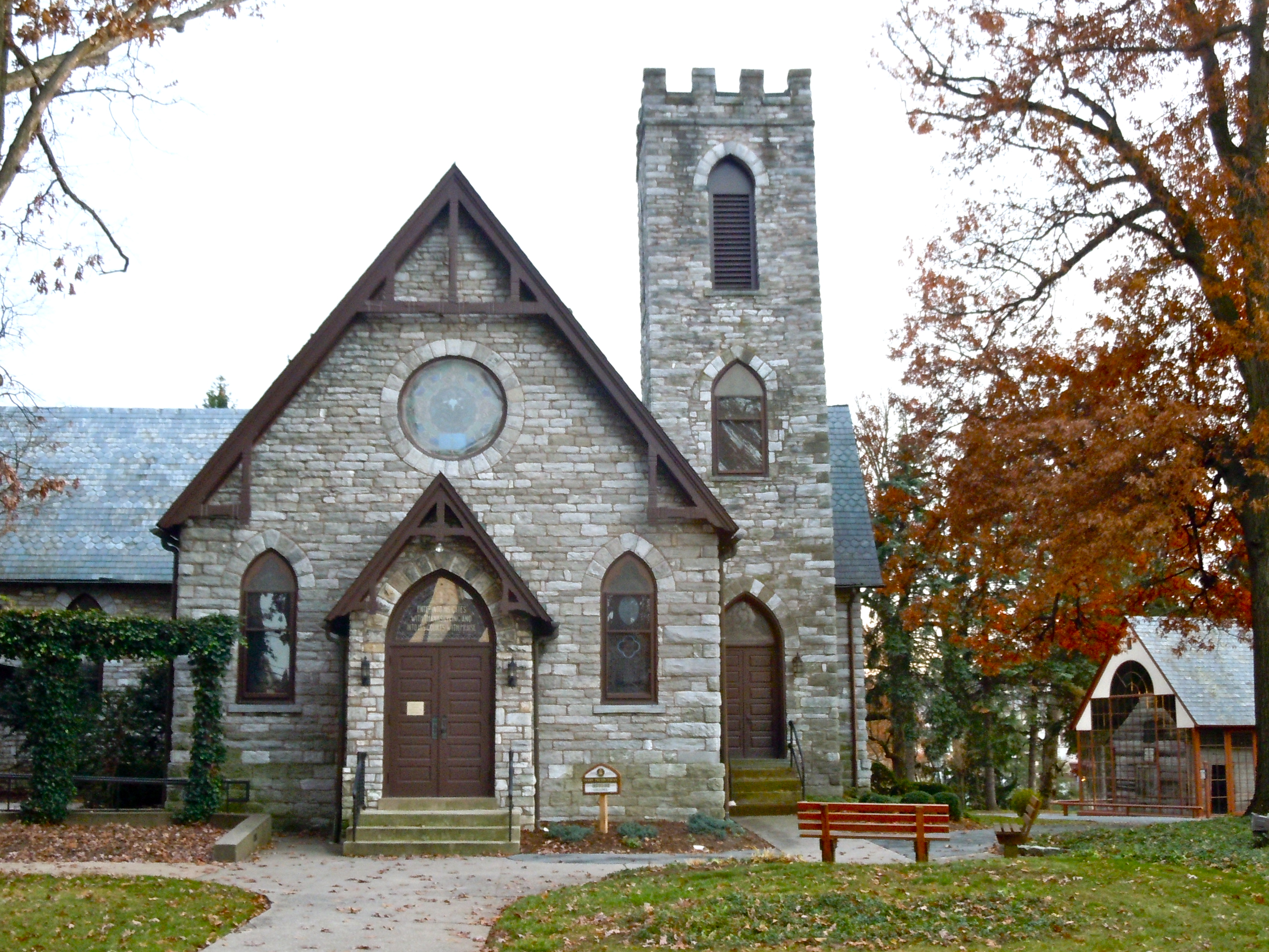
- Derry Church Session House, 2:25, Derry Presbyterian Church
