= ZooAmerica =

Zoo in Hershey, Pennsylvania

Coordinates: 40°17′15″N 76°39′03″W

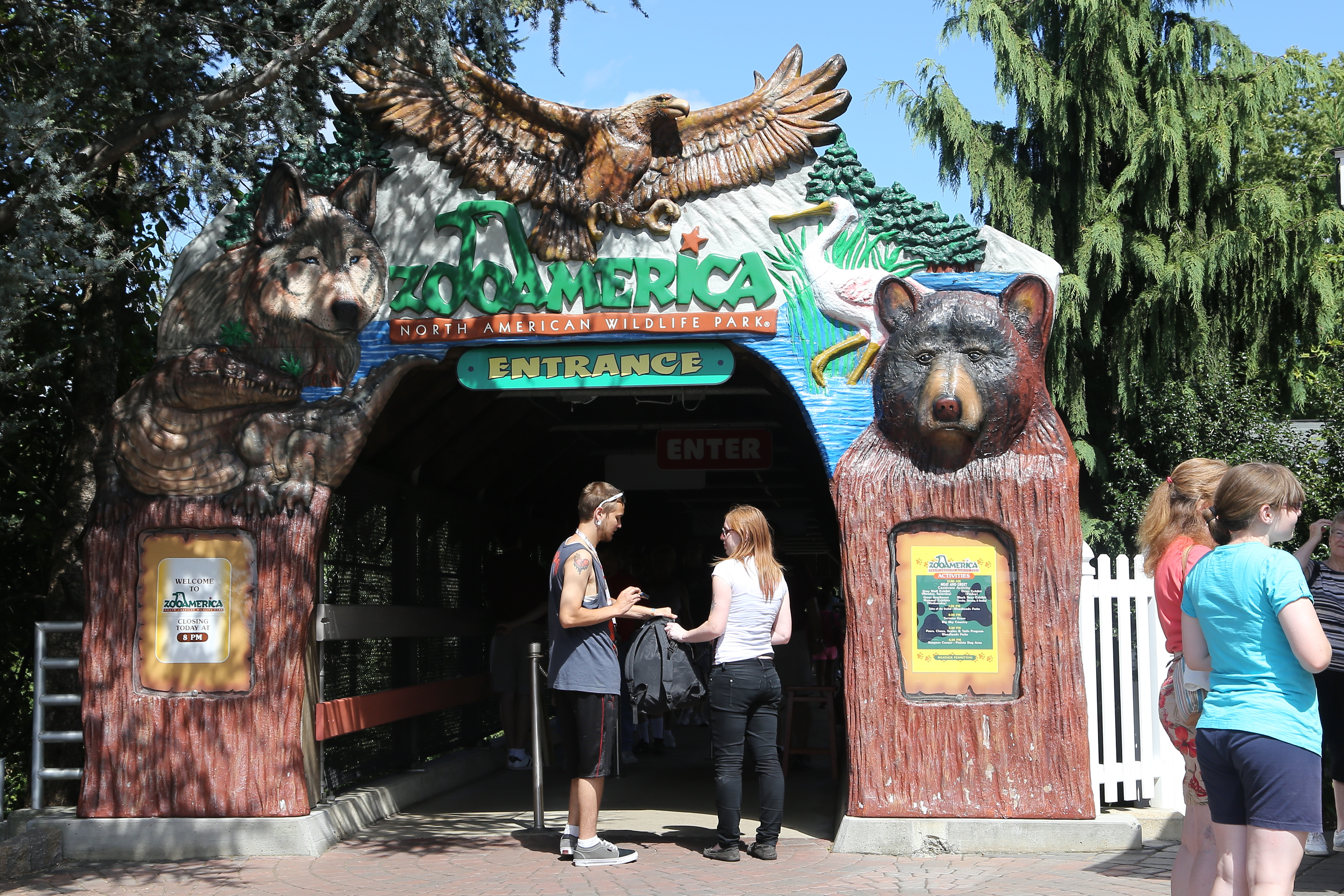
- Entrance to ZooAmerica
- Interactive map of ZooAmerica
- Date opened: 1910
- Location: Hershey, Pennsylvania, U.S.
- Land area: 11 acres (4.5 ha)
- No. of animals: More than 200
- No. of species: More than 75
- Annual visitors: 3.2 million
- Memberships: AZA, WAZA
- Owner: Hershey Trust Company, Hershey Entertainment and Resorts Company
- Public transit: Hershey Trolley Works
- Website: https://www.zooamerica.com/

ZooAmerica is a zoo located in Hershey, Pennsylvania, United States. It was founded in 1910 by Milton S. Hershey with a few animals, including bears, birds, and deer. Today, it covers 11 acres and is home to more than 75 species and 200 individual animals, including some that are rare and endangered.

The zoo is privately controlled by the Hershey Trust Company and is connected to Hersheypark. It is also an accredited member of the Association of Zoos and Aquariums (AZA) and the World Association of Zoos and Aquariums (WAZA).

== History ==
=== 20th century ===
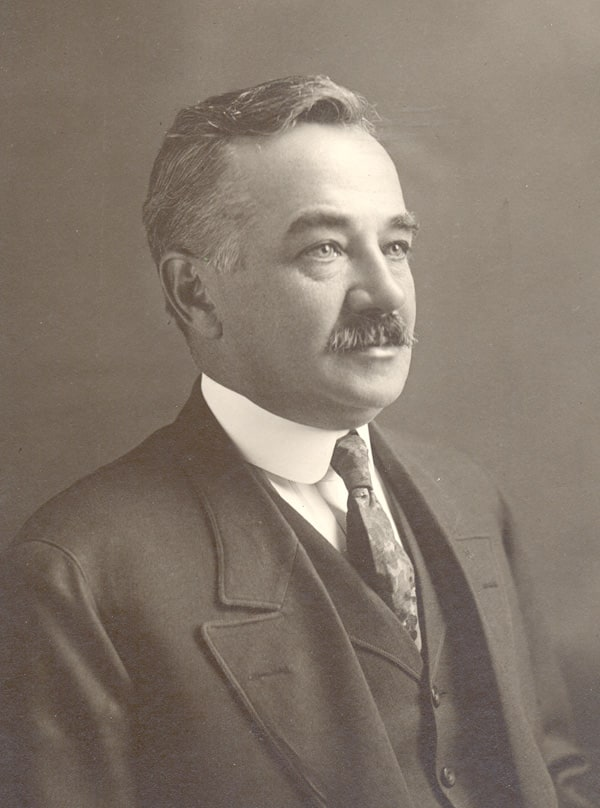
ZooAmerica's founder, Milton Hershey

In 1905, Franz and Louise Zinner moved to Lebanon, Pennsylvania, from Weisenberg, Germany. Mr. Zinner was unable to keep the 12 prairie dogs which he had been given by a friend, so he gave them to Milton S. Hershey who went on to use them as an attraction at Hershey Park. In 1910, Mr. Zinner received a black bear from the same friend and once again, it was given to Hershey. With the acquisition of another animal, Hershey decided to build a zoo that included bears, birds, deer, and other animals.

In 1910, the park officially opened and throughout the year, the zoo received a few more bears, angora goats, fox squirrels, opossums, peacocks, pheasants, and zebus. In 1914, the zoo received a lion, monkeys, and a leopard. In 1915, the zoo received major renovations to help alleviate the overflow since new animals were arriving. Those included the addition of the Hershey Laundry building. Once the renovations were done, the center of the zoo had a large building and every enclosure was renovated and some exhibits were built along the creek. In 1916, the zoo displayed hundreds of animals.

By 1934, the zoo covered more than 40 acres, had a reptile house and a pair of baby elephants, but they were sold after Hershey overheard a guest talk about how they prefer the monkeys.

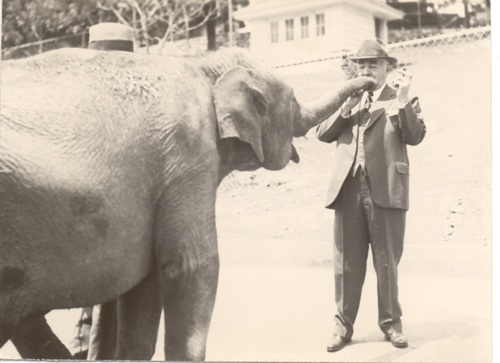
Milton Hershey with an elephant at ZooAmerica, 1920

After Milton Hershey's death and the end of World War II, the zoo opened under new leadership. The zoo acquired a variety of new animals including African sheep, antelope, aoudad, bison, black bear, chipmunk, crow, deer, duck, emu, fox, goat, goose, groundhog, hare, hawk, llama, monkey, opossum, owl, parakeet, partridge, pheasant, rabbit, raccoon, skunk, squirrel, and wolf. The zoo also built a diversified wildlife education exhibit on Pennsylvania's wildlife.

In 1971, Hershey Park and Zoo America both closed for renovations. A year later, they both re-opened, the zoo included a new monkey island, a barnyard petting zoo and baby animals such as llamas and elephants. Six years later, John Strawbridge III became the new director of ZooAmerica. Under his direction, the zoo was connected with Hershey Park and decided to focus entirely on North American animals. He even made sure the animals had naturalistic exhibits.

The new North American Wildlife Park occupied 11 acres and consisted of five sections: North Woods, Eastern Woodlands, Big Sky Country, Grassy Waters, and Cactus Community.

In 1982, ZooAmerica was accredited by the Association of Zoos and Aquariums becoming only the second zoo or aquarium in Pennsylvania to get accredited.

=== 21st century ===
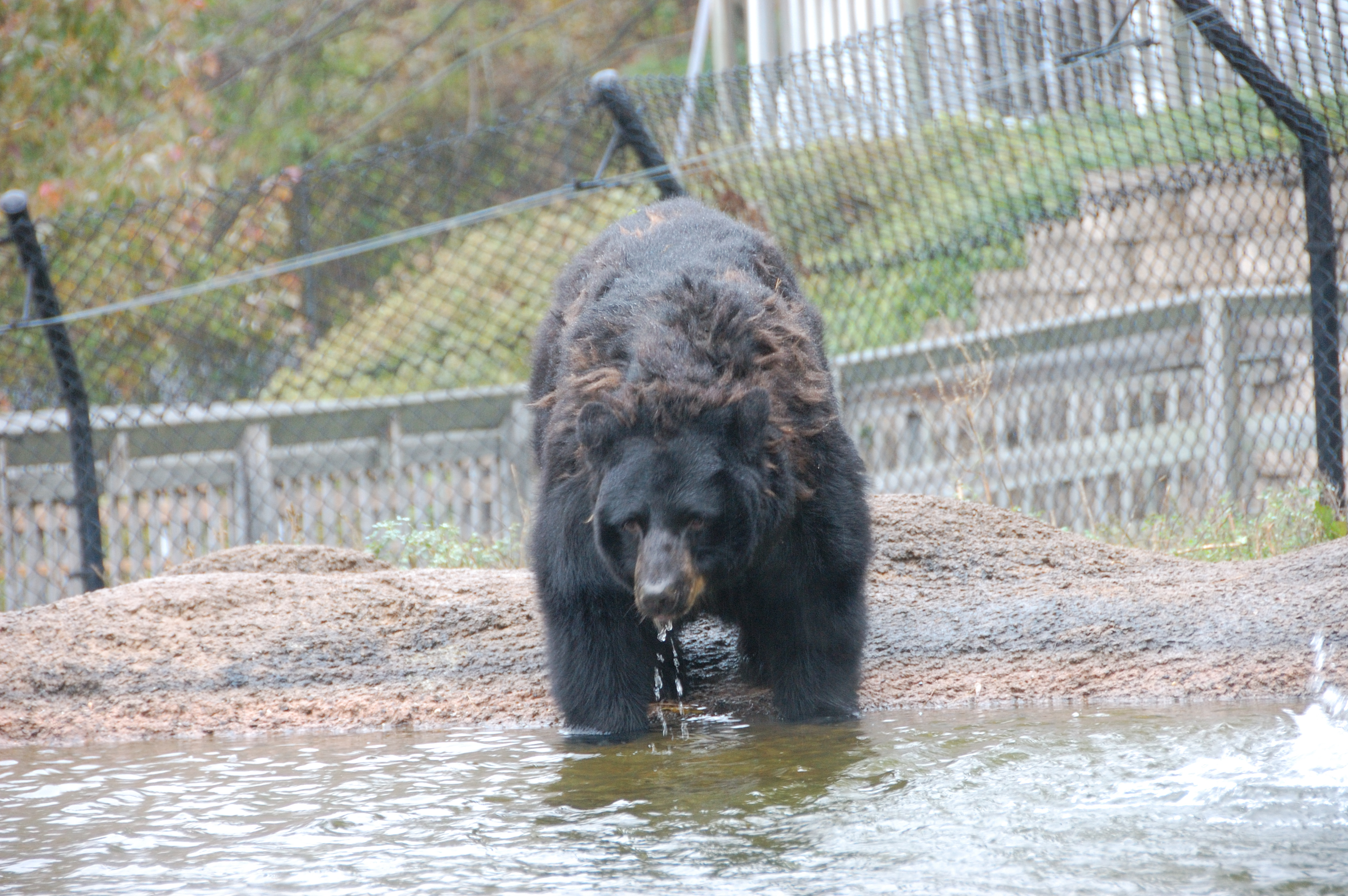
A black bear at ZooAmerica

Finally, in 2000 ZooAmerica opened a new bear exhibit featuring hills, grass, toys, and a 13,000-gallon swimming pond with fish for the bears. The following year two albino alligators were temporarily acquired, and another in 2012.

In 2004, the zoo established a program for kids to become more involved with conservation. It included an official mascot, Ranger Scratch, and the Ranger Scratch Kid's Club, a program designed to educate kids about conservation and environmental issues. Five years later, the zoo finished construction of their new education building, the Woodlands Education Center, which gives guests experiences with animals.

== Exhibits ==
=== Southern Swamps ===
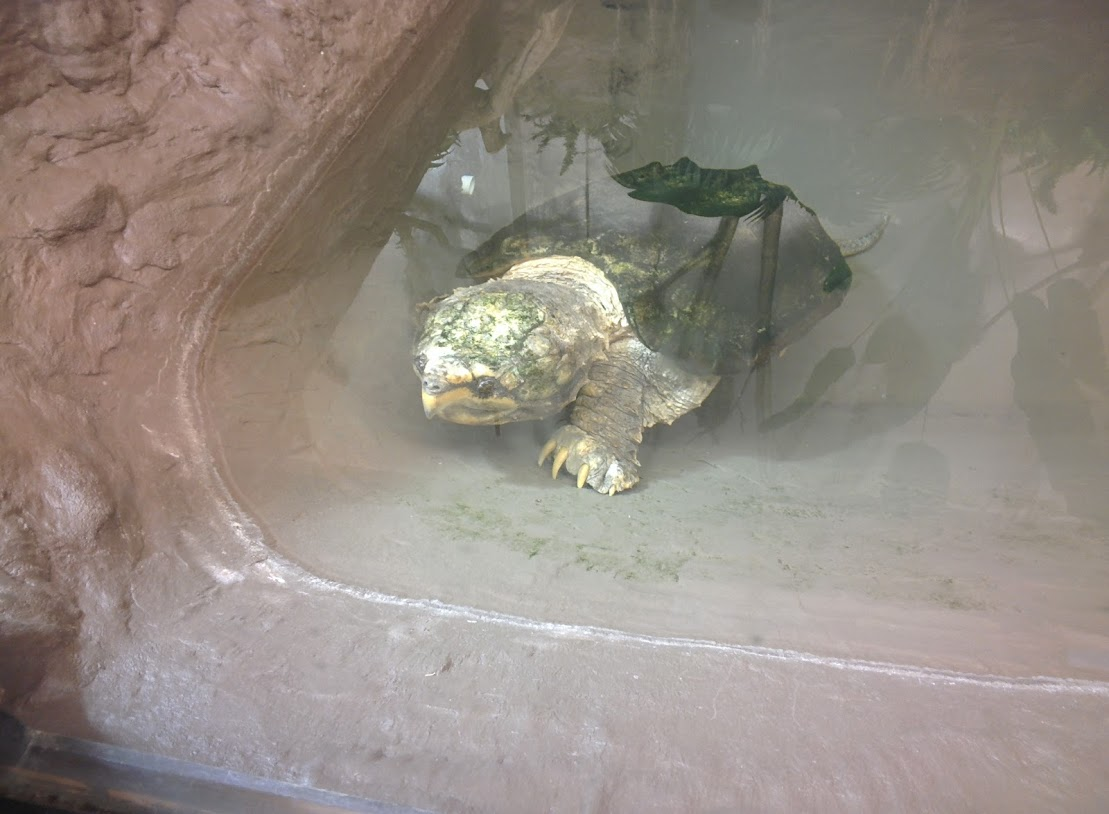
Goodyear, an alligator snapping turtle, who lived at ZooAmerica

The first section of ZooAmerica is the Southern Swamps, which has a variety of animals from marshy, semi-tropical areas. Some of the animals include the cottonmouth, roseate spoonbill, fiddler crab, eastern diamondback rattlesnake, bluespotted sunfish, gopher tortoise, pygmy rattlesnake, corn snake, barred owl, Florida gar, alligator snapping turtle and American alligator.

=== Great Southwest ===
Another section at ZooAmerica is the Great Southwest, which includes a section with nocturnal animals, armadillos and an open-bird sanctuary. Some animals on exhibit include the thick-billed parrot, blue spiny lizard, Mexican beaded lizard, chuckwalla, Gila monster, roadrunner, Gambel's quail, burrowing owl, desert tortoise, nine-banded armadillo, Arizona mountain kingsnake, Texas banded gecko, common vampire bat, sidewinder, gopher snake, rosy boa, black-footed ferret, ocelot, ringtail, coati, and desert box turtle.

=== Eastern Woodlands ===
The Eastern Woodlands section shows guests how animals are adapting to an ever-changing eastern United States. Some animals, which can be seen include the red-tailed hawk, barn owl, bobcat, river otter, white-tailed deer, wild turkey, and black bear.

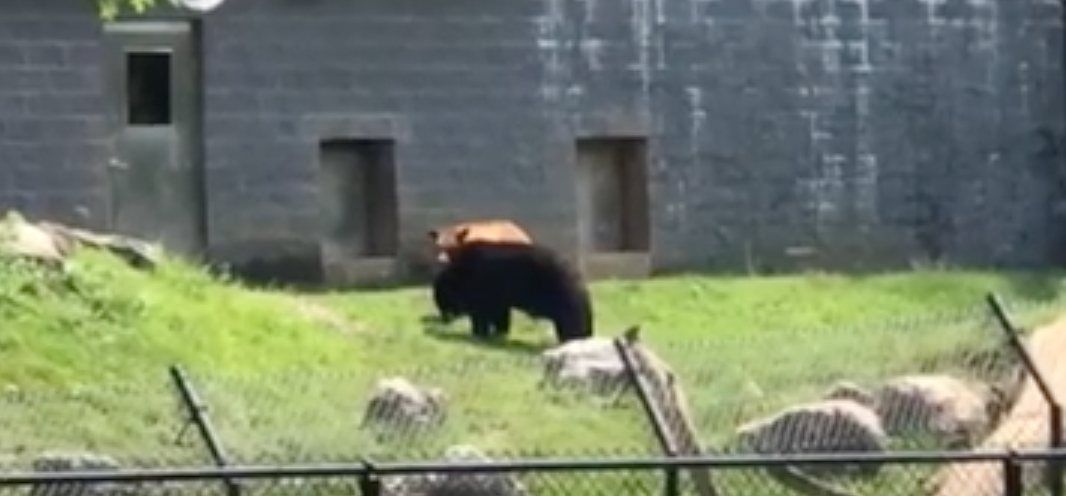
The black bears at ZooAmerica

=== Big Sky Country ===
Towards the end of ZooAmerica is Big Sky Country, which exhibits animals in their native environment in a unique way. It has vast pieces of flat grass, replicas of the bottom of mountain summits and areas where short grass meets with tall grass. Some of the wildlife species include the black-tailed prairie dog, common raven, American elk, mountain lion, long-eared owl, sandhill crane, turkey vulture, and pronghorn.

=== Northlands ===
The last section at ZooAmerica is the Northlands which showcases animals that are native from Newfoundland across Canada into Alaska. Some animals on exhibit there are the snowy owl, peregrine falcon, gray wolf, bald eagle, porcupine, American marten and Canada lynx. The section provides information on how animals survive in some of the coldest climates.

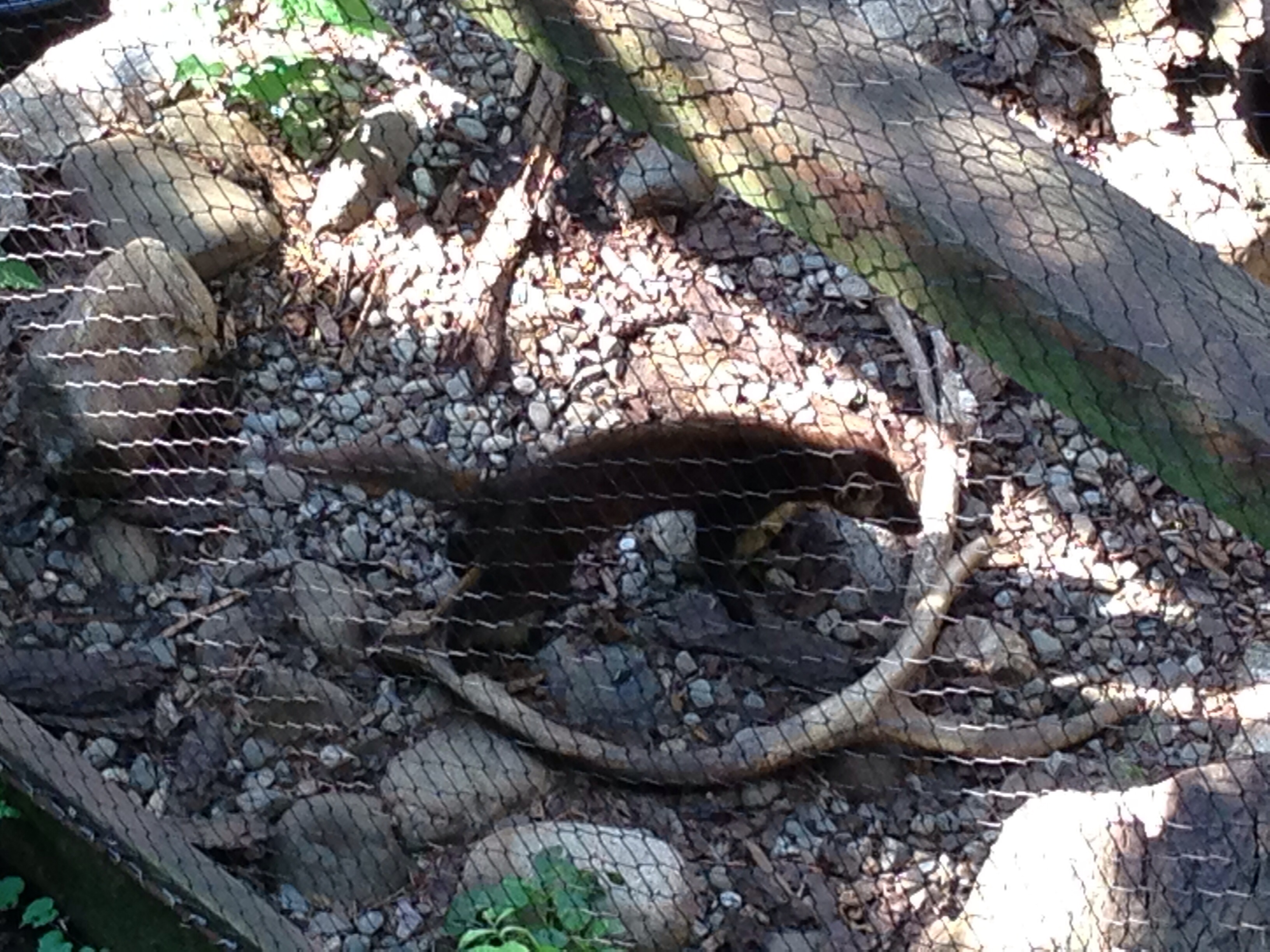
An American marten at ZooAmerica

== Conservation ==
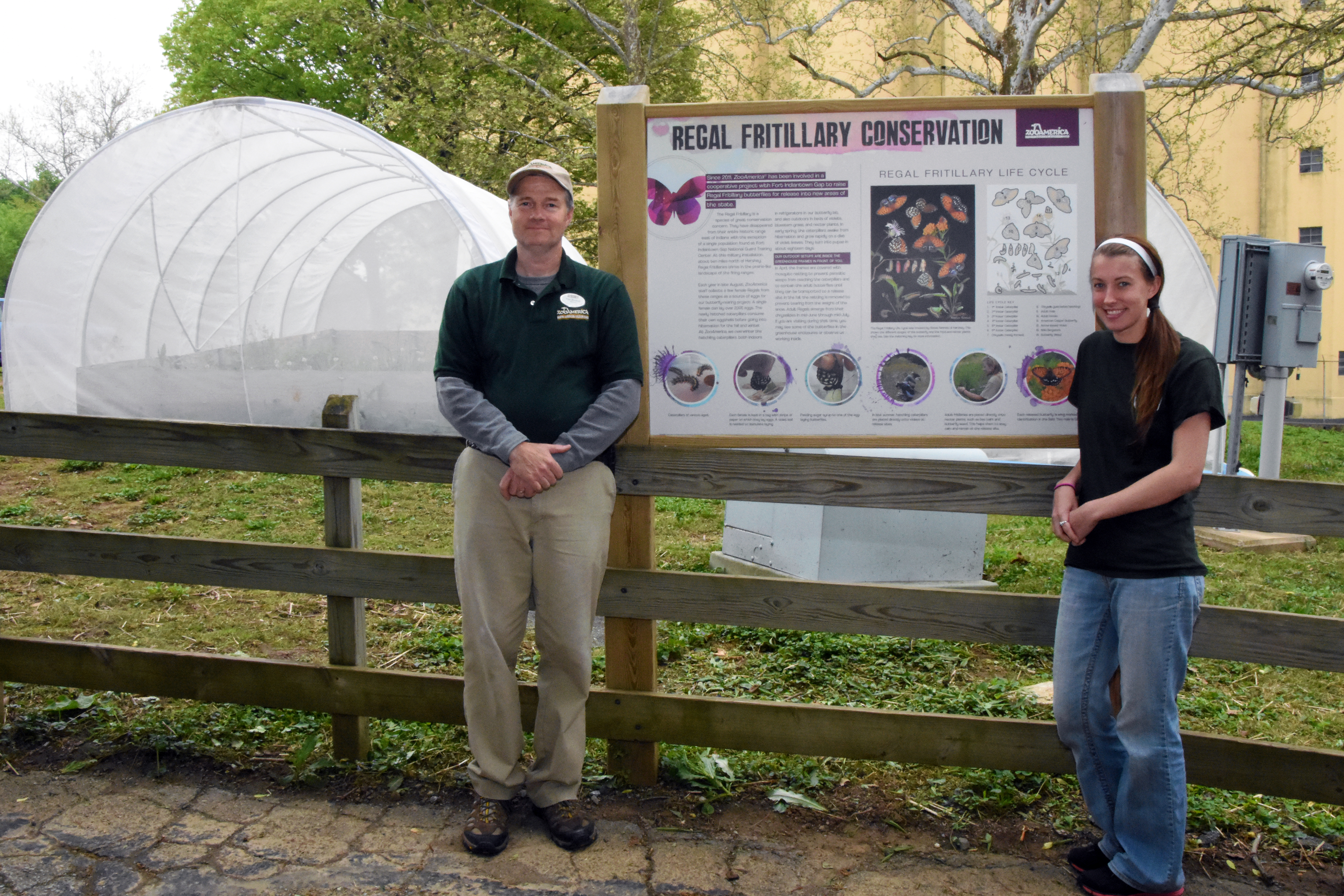
Butterfly conservation efforts at ZooAmerica

ZooAmerica is an active member in the conservation and breeding process known as the Species Survival Plan (SSP). The zoo currently houses and is working to breed the thick-billed parrots, Canada lynx, black-footed ferret, and ocelots. Previously, the zoo has also held swift fox as part of the SSP.

In the past, ZooAmerica played a big role in bringing back the golden eagle and peregrine falcon, which were both facing severe threats in the wild. However, ZooAmerica has raised many birds of prey which were later released, including a peregrine that was later found nesting along the Susquehanna River.

Beginning in 2011, ZooAmerica became involved in a cooperative project with Fort Indiantown Gap to raise Regal Fritillary butterflies for release. In 2014, The National Military Fish & Wildlife Association honored two naturalists at ZooAmerica, Tim Becker and Ann Holzman, for their work in the reintroduction of the regal fritillary butterfly to Pennsylvania.

== Controversy ==
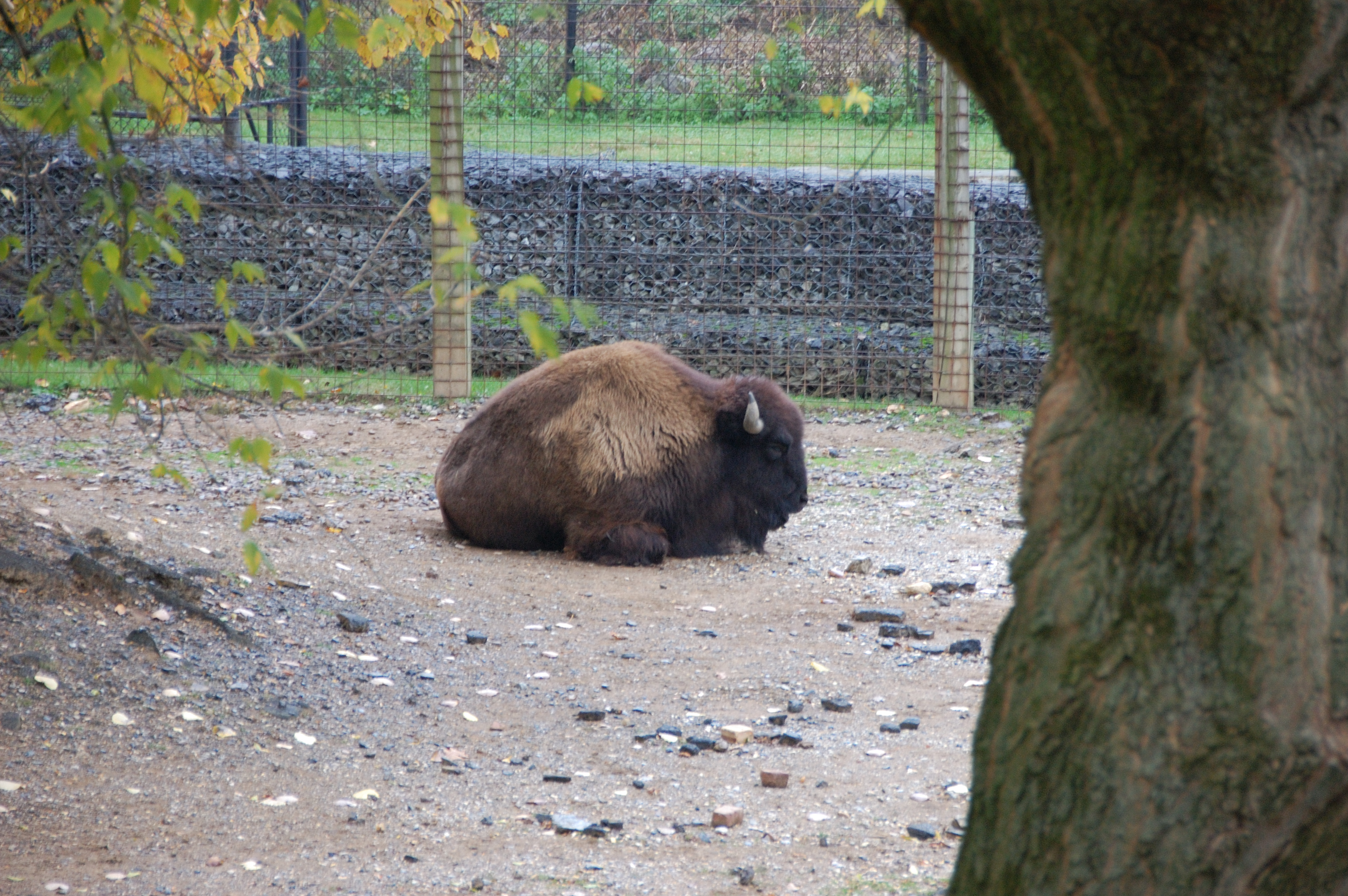
An American bison at ZooAmerica

On September 7, 2011, flooding took place in Hershey, Pennsylvania, due to Tropical Storm Lee. The rain broke records set by Hurricane Agnes in 1972. As a result, Spring Creek, which runs through Hershey Park and ZooAmerica, overflowed. Many animals were put into safe and secure areas, but the bison, Esther and Ryan, were just moved to higher ground in their exhibit. Unfortunately, the rain increased drastically, resulting in the animals panicking. Even though keepers used ropes to keep them above water, one of them drowned and the second was forced to be euthanized. 9 Prairie Dogs also lost their lives in the flood.

== In popular culture ==
=== Literature ===
In Carole Marsh's book, The Mystery in Chocolate Town...Hershey, Pennsylvania, and in Milton Hershey: Young Chocolatier by M.M. Eboch, ZooAmerica is mentioned multiple times.

=== Movies ===
In Milton Hershey: The Chocolate King, ZooAmerica is mentioned quite a few times. The film was narrated by Jack Perkins and is available on Netflix and Biography.com.
