= Hershey Public Library =

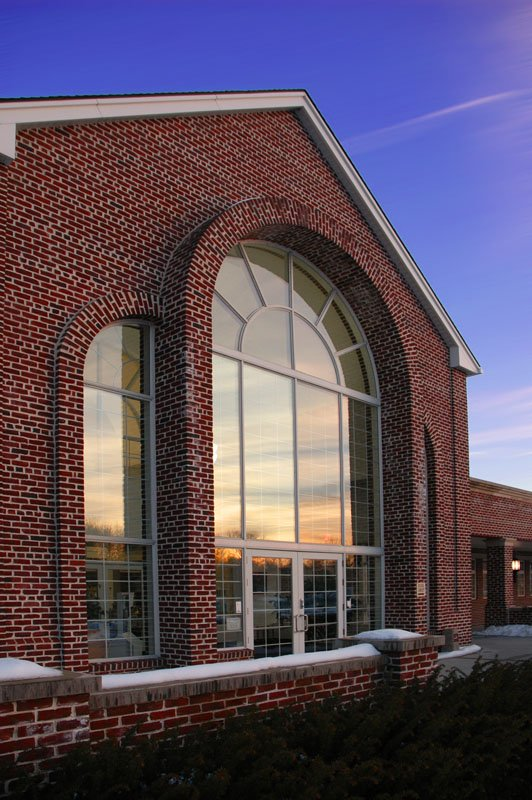
- Location: Hershey, Pennsylvania
- Established: 1913

Other information
- Director: Alison Trautmann
- Website: http://www.hersheylibrary.org/

The Hershey Public Library is a full-service public library located in Hershey, Pennsylvania, United States.

The 29,000-square-foot (2,700 m^{2}) facility features over 102,000 books, DVDs, CDs, and more. Its special collections include the Pennsylvania Collection, Palliative Care Collection, and World Languages Collection.

The library is staffed by professional librarians and provides reference service, interlibrary loan, Internet access, and numerous programs for children, teens, and adults.

The library is maintained by Derry Township and is governed by a seven-member Board of Trustees.

== History ==
=== Cocoa House, 1911-1912 ===
In 1911, editorials appeared in the Hershey Press calling for a public library in Hershey. In 1912, a permanent public library was created in Hershey by drawing upon the resources of a traveling library from Harrisburg. The library was housed in the YMCA Building, a part of Cocoa House, a community center that also contained a bank, post office, store, theatre, dormitories, and Hershey Trust Company offices. Point was made, however, to manage the library through a joint committee of the YWCA and YMCA, enabling resources to be available to both men and women. Librarian Ella F. Kegerreis reported that from February 1912 to January 1913, the library held 338 books and served 256 patrons.

=== Hershey Department Store, 1913-1914 ===
Hershey Public Library proper was founded in 1913. The earlier collection was relocated to the Hershey Department Store. In November 1914, Lynn W. Meekins, a recent graduate from Johns Hopkins University, was appointed librarian.

=== Hershey Central Theater Building, 1915-1927 ===
In 1914, the library moved to the newly renovated and renamed Hershey Central Theater Building. As described in the Hershey Press, the library consisted of adult and juvenile book collections, reading tables, electric lighting, and office. By June 1915, the library reported that circulation had doubled since the same period in 1914. By December 1915, the Hershey Press reported that in proportion to population, the library’s circulation exceeded that of the New York Public Library. Also that month, books in Italian were placed in circulation to meet the needs of the area’s Italian-speaking residents. In 1917, Zelma Baker was appointed librarian.

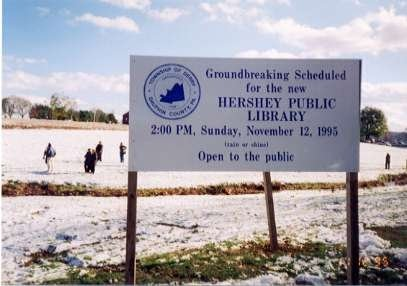
Groundbreaking Notice for the Hershey Public Library building on Cocoa Avenue, 1995

=== Post Office building, 1928-1932 ===
In June 1928, the library moved a third time to the second floor of a former post office.

=== Community Center, 1933-1980 ===
The library found another home in the newly built Community Center in September 1933.

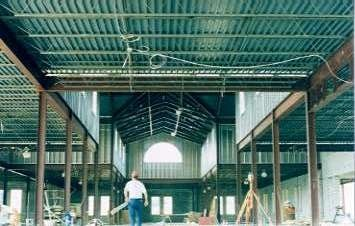
Interior of the current Hershey Public Library building during construction

=== Granada Avenue, 1981-1996 ===
In 1981, the Hershey Public Library moved to the former Derry Township Middle School on Granada Avenue and became a part of the Derry Township municipality. Prior to this, the library was owned by the Milton Hershey foundation.

=== Cocoa Avenue, 1997-present ===
In 1996, the library again began to suffer space constraints. A decision was made to create a new building on Cocoa Avenue to house the 77,000 volume collection. This new 29,000 square foot library broke ground in 1996 at the cost of $6 million. On April 26, 1997, the library officially moved to its new location.

== Resources ==
=== Collections ===
The library owns more than 102,000 books, videos and DVDs, music cassettes and CDs, puppets, magazines, audio books and software. Its special collections include the Pennsylvania Collection, Palliative Care Collection, and World Languages Collection.

The Pennsylvania Collection, located in the Hershey Room, contains published materials relating primarily to the history and culture of Pennsylvania with a special focus on Derry Township and Dauphin County.

The Palliative Care Collection features materials dealing with care of the ill, death, and grieving, donated by the Association of Faculty and Friends of the Penn State Milton S. Hershey Medical Center.

The World Languages Collection features a range of materials in foreign languages, including Chinese, Korean, German, Hindi, Russian, and Spanish.

=== Programs and services ===
Hershey Public Library’s in-house services include regular programming, classes, and events for adults, teens, and children; public access computer network; reference services; interlibrary loan services; meeting room access; a Library on Wheels service for housebound residents of Hershey, Hummelstown, and Palmyra; and a Teen Advisory Board to involve local youth in library planning.

== Friends of the Library ==
The Friends of the Hershey Public Library was founded over 20 years ago and has contributed over $200,000 to the library since 1994. The Friends organization also oversees volunteers to shelve or repair books and sponsors distinguished author visits; free adult, teen, and children’s programs; and the Library on Wheels service.

== See also ==
- Dauphin County, Pennsylvania
- Milton S. Hershey
