= Keith Bilbrey =

American radio personality

- Born: August 14, 1952 (age 74); Cookeville, Tennessee
- Spouse: Emy Joe Bilbrey
- Presenting career
- Show: Larry's Country Diner and Huckabee
- Stations: RFD-TV, TBN
- Show: Music City Roots
- Station: WHPY-FM
- Previous show: Grand Ole Opry

Keith Bilbrey (born August 14, 1952) is an American country music disc jockey and television host in Nashville, Tennessee. He served as a disc jockey at Nashville's WSM, as an announcer on the Grand Ole Opry, and as the host of TNN’s Grand Ole Opry Live. He is also the show announcer for Huckabee, a variety show hosted by Mike Huckabee, on the Trinity Broadcasting Network.

== Early career ==
Keith Bilbrey was born in Cookeville, Tennessee to Leo and Ethel Bilbrey, the youngest of three children. His interest in radio began in fourth grade and he got his broadcast license at the age of 14. In 1968, Bilbrey went to work at Cookeville's WHUB, soon after his 16th birthday. He remained at WHUB for six years. Keith attended Tennessee Technological University from 1970–1973 where he was a member of the Sigma Chi fraternity.

== WSM and the Grand Ole Opry (1974–2009) ==
In 1974, Bilbrey moved to Nashville to work for WSM, first as a substitute announcer for WSM-FM and then as a full-time disc jockey on WSM's FM and AM stations. Throughout his career, Bilbrey worked every time slot at WSM.

In 1982, Bilbrey began announcing on the Grand Ole Opry, joining a long tradition of legendary Opry announcers, including George D. Hay, Grant Turner, Ralph Emery, and Hairl Hensley. When The Nashville Network (TNN) began televising a thirty-minute portion of the show in 1985, the young announcer became the first host of Grand Ole Opry Live. Bilbrey hosted Opry Live, along with the Opry warm-up show Backstage Live, until TNN stopped airing the show in 2000.

Bilbrey's affiliation with the Opry earned him additional opportunities in the world of country music television and radio. Starting in 1982, Bilbrey was the announcer for Ernest Tubb's Midnight Jamboree, a post that Bilbrey held until Tubb's death in 1984. Bilbrey was the announcer for CBS’s telecast of the Country Music Association Awards for three years, as well as the CMA’s 35th Anniversary Special. Bilbrey continues to announce the non-televised portion of the CMA Award Show. He also served as emcee for a variety of television specials, including TNN's Music City News Awards: An Evening of Country Greats, Honky-Tonkin’ at the Wildhorse (which featured Aaron Tippin and Marty Stuart) and the American Federation of Musicians 100th Anniversary Show. Bilbrey also played the role of historian for the A&E biographies of Buck Owens and Ronnie Milsap. In 2006, Bilbrey received the prestigious AIR Awards Lifetime Achievement Award.

== WSMV-TV and the Ralph Emery Show (1976–2000) ==
In addition to his career in country music, Bilbrey spent twenty-four years as an on-air personality for WSM-TV, NBC’s Nashville affiliate. Bilbrey served the majority of this period as the weatherman on the nation’s top-rated local morning show, The Ralph Emery Show, which featured live music and skits in addition to the traditional news, weather and sports.

== Leaving WSM ==
In March 2009, Bilbrey was let go from WSM and the Grand Ole Opry. The news drew a great deal of local coverage, including numerous articles in The Tennessean and daily stories on the local news affiliates. Angry fans circulated a petition that collected over 4,000 signatures. According to The Tennessean, the decision to release Bilbrey was simply a matter of cutting costs with advertising revenue slumping. At Bilbrey’s last Opry show, many performers dedicated songs to him, and Marty Stuart brought Bilbrey to the front of the stage for a final word with a standing ovation.

== Recent career ==
Bilbrey currently serves as the studio announcer for Huckabee, a TV political commentary program on TBN hosted by the Republican former governor of Arkansas Mike Huckabee. He is also currently the announcer and Larry's sidekick on Larry's Country Diner television series on RFD-TV (including live performances in Branson, Missouri), and co-hosts Nashville Country Cookin' with his wife (Emy Joe) on the Rural TV Network. Additionally, he hosts a syndicated radio show, Classic Country Today. The weekly, two-hour program can be heard on approximately 175 stations nationwide. Bilbrey was inducted into the Tennessee Radio Hall of Fame in 2015, while pursuing a variety of business opportunities and writing his memoir. In 2012, Bilbrey was recognized by the Sigma Chi fraternity with the Significant Sig Award, presented to "those alumni members whose achievements in their fields of endeavor have brought honor and prestige to the name of Sigma Chi".
