= The Hotel Hershey =

Hotel in Hershey, Pennsylvania, US

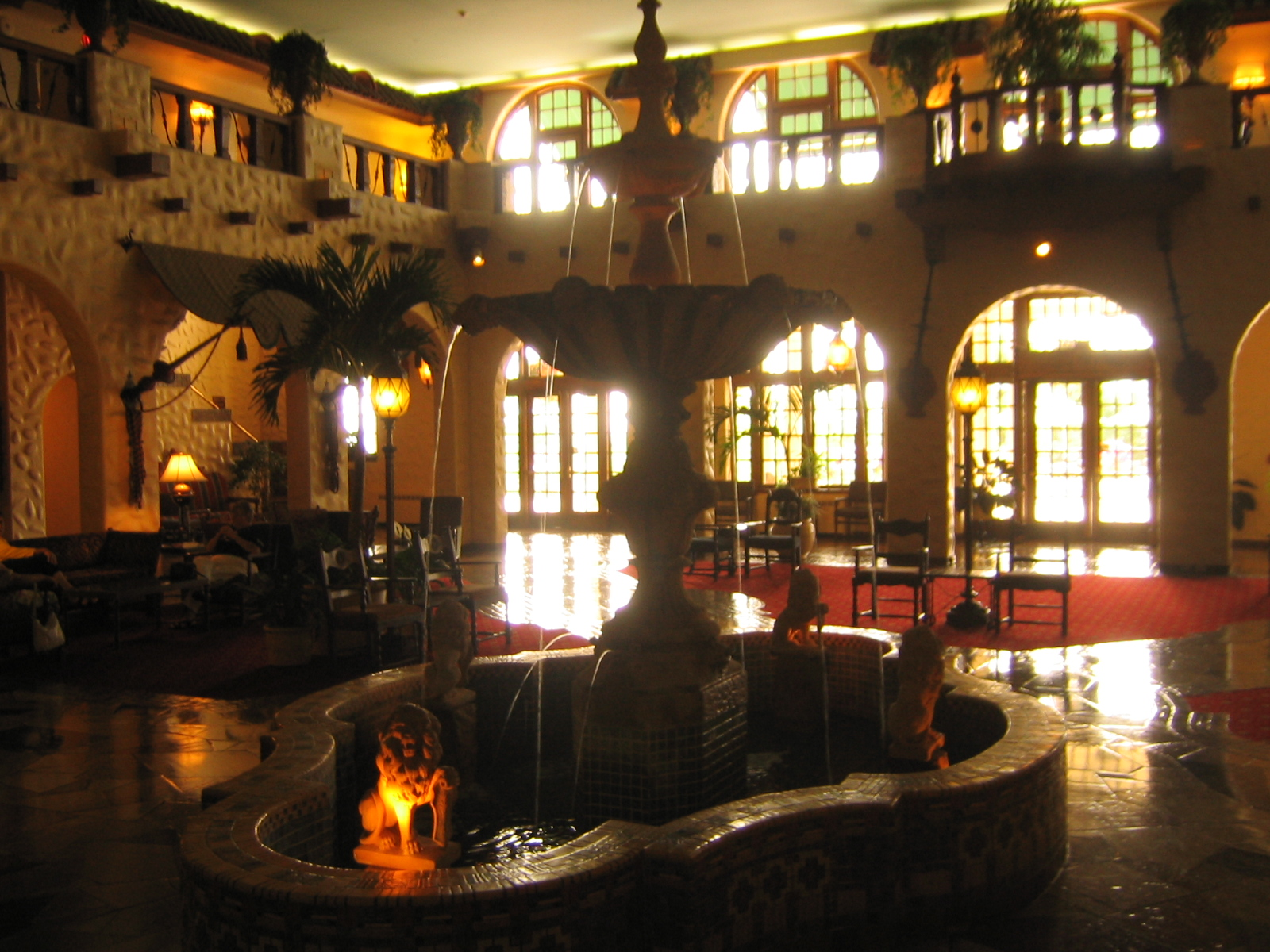
- The original fountain lobby

General information
- Architectural style: Spanish Colonial Revival
- Location: 100 Hotel Rd, Hershey, Pennsylvania
- Coordinates: 40.2998°N 76.6596°W
- Opened: 1933
- Owner: Hershey Entertainment and Resorts Company

Other information
- Number of rooms: 326
- Number of restaurants: 3
- Number of bars: 2

Website
- https://www.thehotelhershey.com/

The Hotel Hershey is a historic resort hotel in Hershey, Pennsylvania. Established in 1933, it is a historical landmark located on a hilltop overlooking Hershey, Pennsylvania, and the surrounding area. It was inducted into Historic Hotels of America, the official program of the National Trust for Historic Preservation, since 1991. It has 326 guest rooms and 23,500 square feet (2,180 m^{2}) of event space.

The hotel's architectural style is Spanish Colonial revival, including mosaic tiles and archways, and a villa-style balcony overlooking the town of Hershey and Hershey Gardens. Historic photographs and original artwork line the halls and decorate guest room walls, as well as the Iberian Lounge, which is designed to resemble dim, fireplace-lit cigar lounges of the past.

== History ==
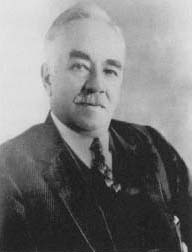
Milton S. Hershey

During the Great Depression, Milton S. Hershey, founder of The Hershey Chocolate Company, planned for the hotel to be a recreation of the famous Heliopolis Palace Hotel, construction plans changed and were delayed due to costs and the death of Hershey's wife, Catherine. When construction began, the new plans drew on Mediterranean and Spanish influences.

Construction began in 1931 and the hotel was completed on May 23, 1932. The effort employed as many as 800 workers. The bill for the hotel was around $2 million. The Hotel officially opened on May 26, 1933. Generating income by then was not the main goal of the project. Being the height of the Great Depression, Hershey was attempting to help the people of the city by creating jobs.

In 1934, a nine-hole golf course was added to the grounds and in 1961, an outdoor swimming pool was added. In 1977, a new 100 room wing was added to the hotel along with a new indoor pool and fitness center. In 2001, a full service spa called "The Spa At The Hotel Hershey" was added. The spa offered treatments featuring chocolate, including chocolate wraps, chocolate baths, chocolate lotion and scrubs. In 2009, The Hotel Hershey completed work on a $67 million expansion and renovation project which included a redesigned exterior and lobby.
