= Hershey Gardens =

Botanical garden and arboretum in Hershey, Pennsylvania, United States

Coordinates: 40.2987°N 76.6570°W

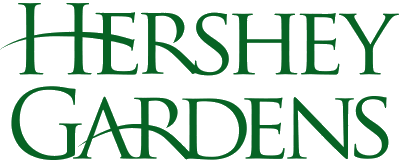

- Location within Pennsylvania Location within the United States
- Type: Botanical garden, Arboretum
- Location: 170 Hotel Road, Hershey, near Harrisburg, Pennsylvania
- Area: 23 acres (9.3 ha)
- Opened: 1937; 89 years ago
- Founder: Milton S. Hershey
- Status: Open year round
- Website: hersheygardens.org

Hershey Gardens is a 23-acre (9.3 ha) botanical garden and arboretum located at 170 Hotel Road, Hershey, near Harrisburg, Pennsylvania. They are set atop a hill overlooking Hersheypark. It was built as a gift from chocolate magnate Milton S. Hershey for his community and to honor his wife, Catherine.

== Overview ==
The garden occupies more than 20 acres just south of the Hotel Hershey. The botanical park was established in 1936 upon instructions of Milton S. Hershey, being opened to the public in June 1937 with a display consisting solely of 7,000 roses arranged in formal beds.

Over the years, Hershey Gardens has grown to contain 5 themed garden areas, with a rose-specific area that includes nearly 14,000 roses and some 800 varieties.

== Gallery ==
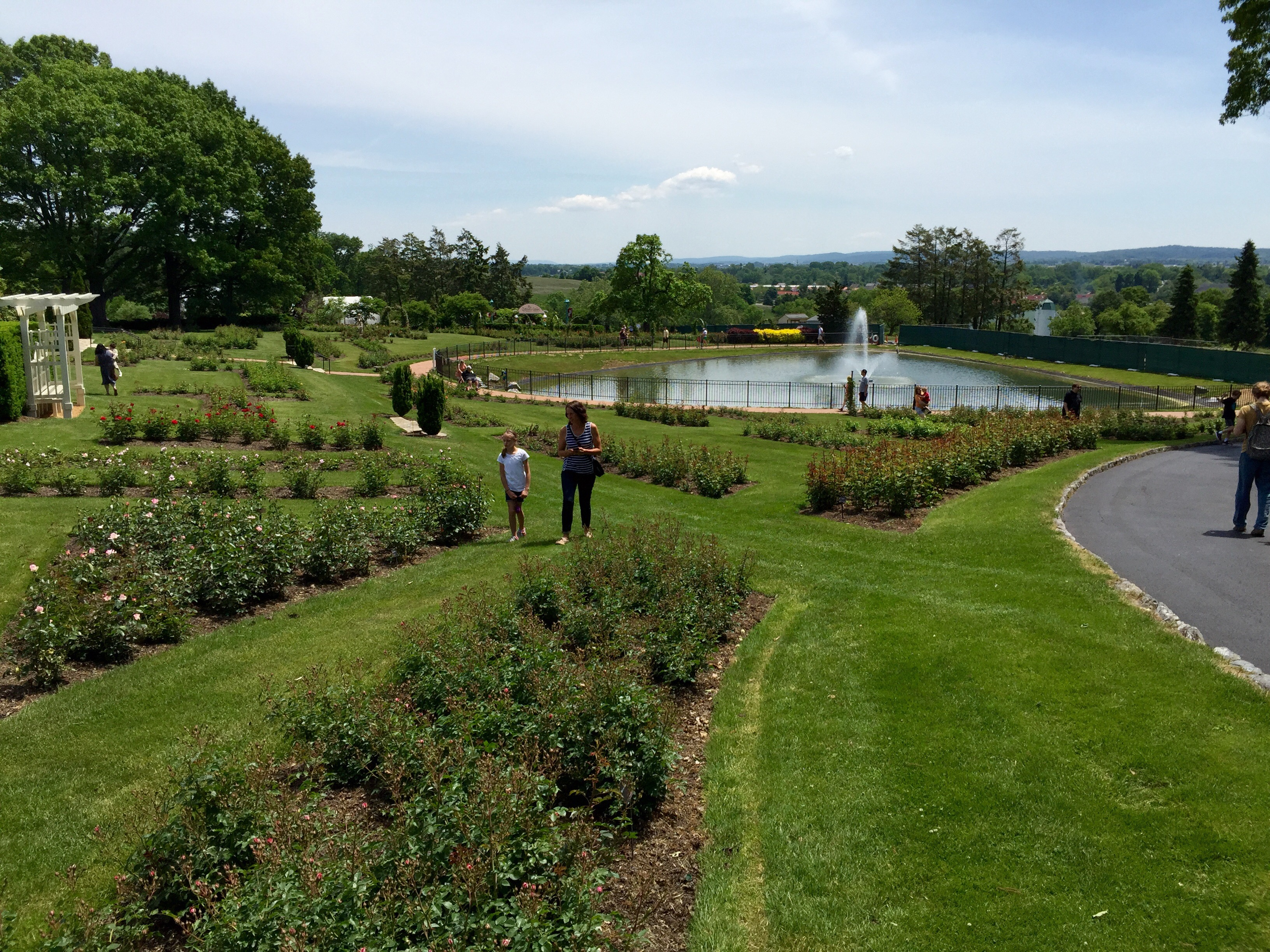
Pond in a garden.

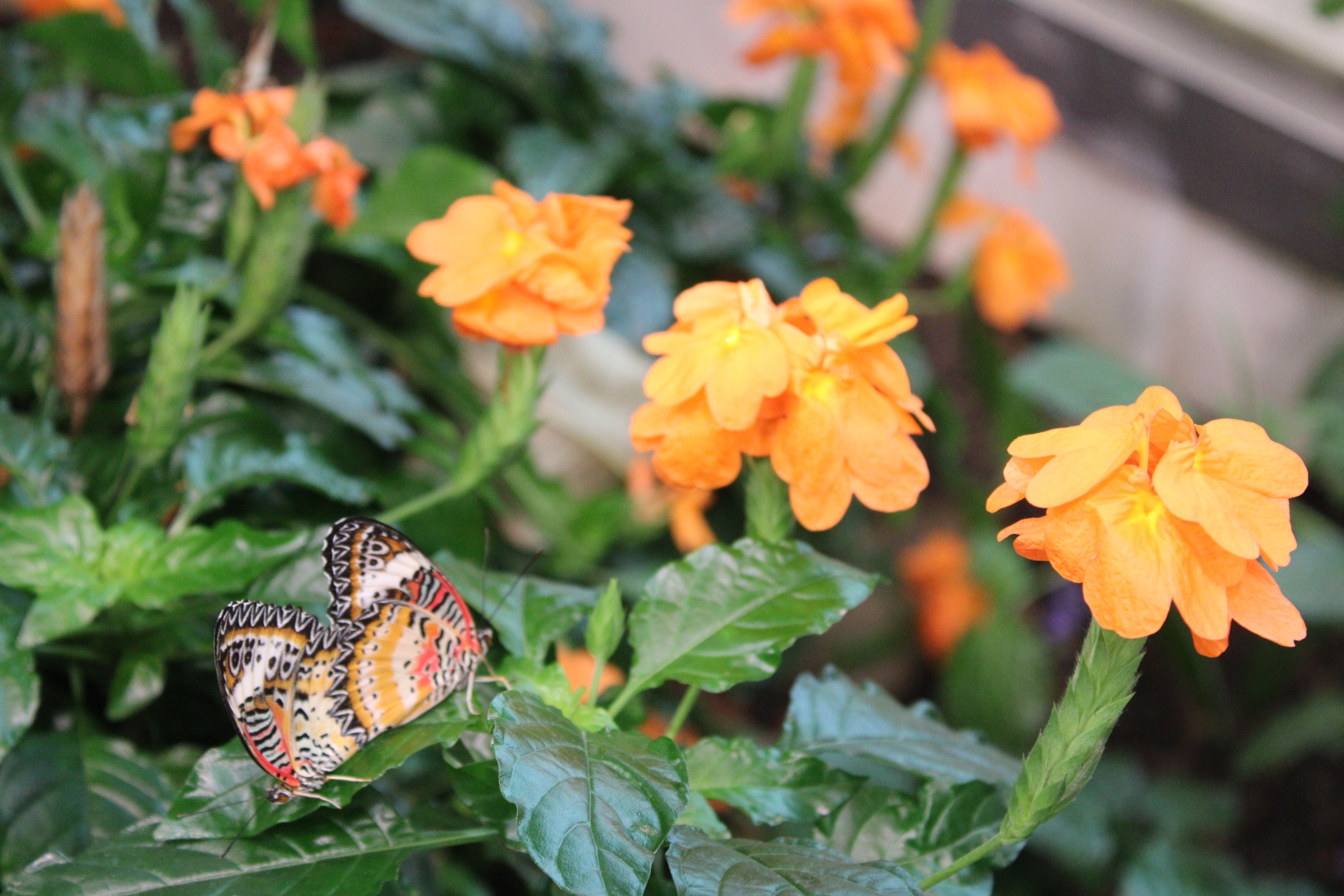
Inside the Butterfly Atrium.

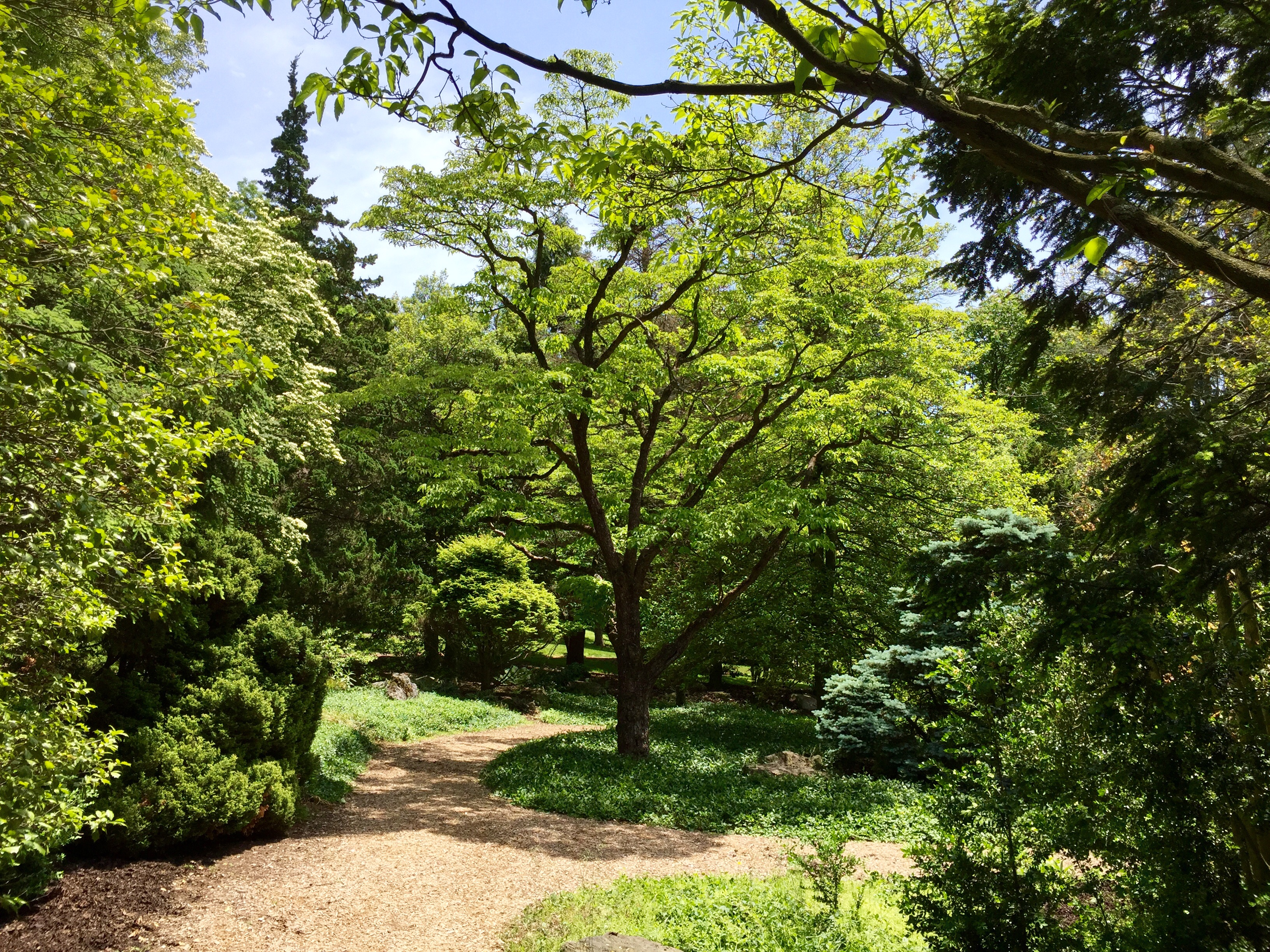
Many trees species are within the arboretum.

== See also ==
- List of botanical gardens in the United States
