= Hershey, Pennsylvania =

Unincorporated community in the United States

- Census-designated place
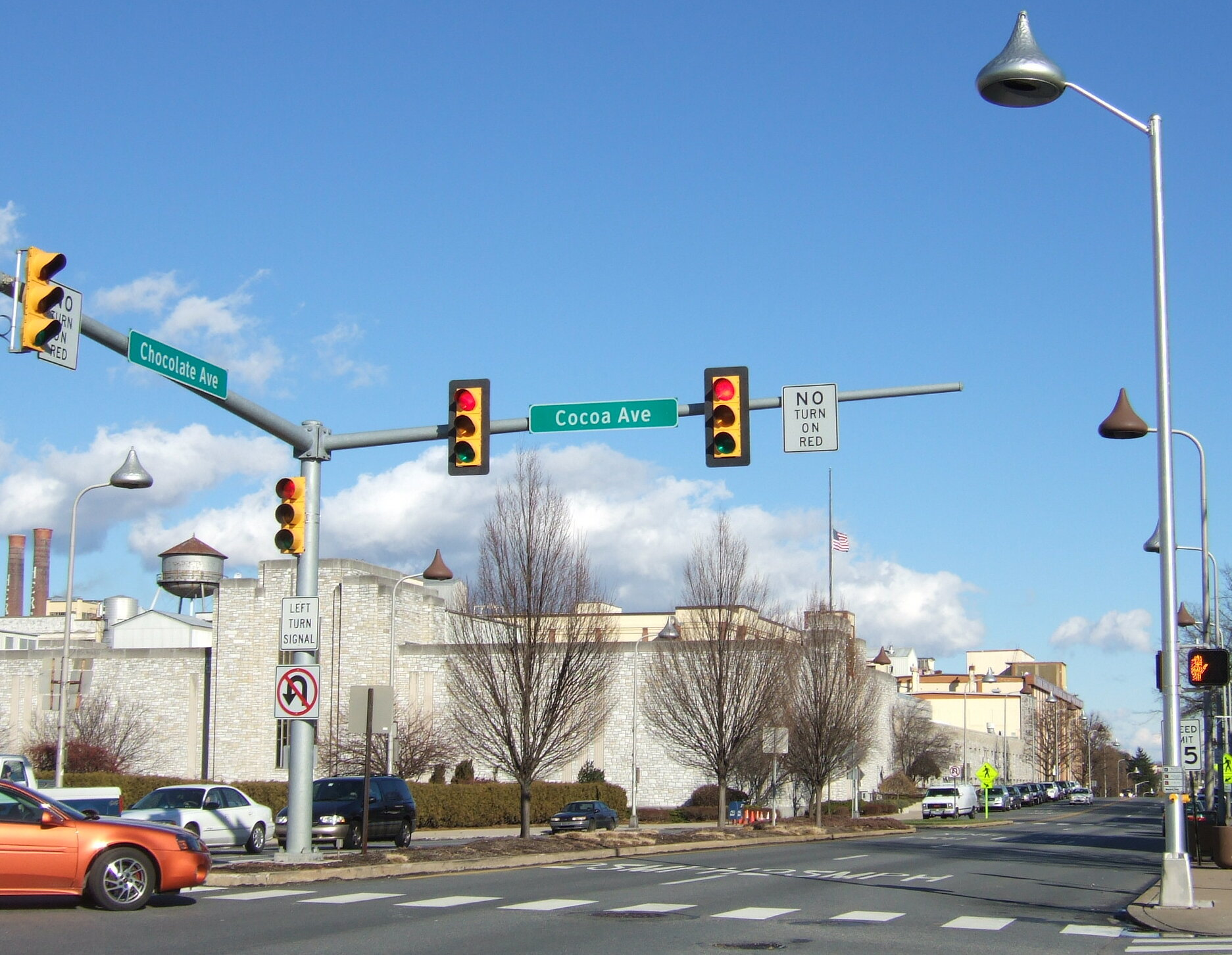
- Hershey Kiss–shaped street lamps in downtown Hershey
- Motto: The Sweetest Place on Earth
- Location of Hershey in Dauphin County (right) and of Dauphin County in Pennsylvania (left)

- Location within Pennsylvania Location within the United States
- Coordinates: 40°16′42″N 76°39′4″W
- Country: United States
- State: Pennsylvania
- County: Dauphin
- Township: Derry
- Founder: Milton S. Hershey
- Named for: Milton S. Hershey

Area
  - Total: 14.42 sq mi (37.34 km^{2})
  - Land: 14.30 sq mi (37.03 km^{2})
  - Water: 0.12 sq mi (0.30 km^{2})
- Elevation: 411 ft (125 m)

Population (2020)
  - Total: 13,858
  - Density: 969.3/sq mi (374.23/km^{2})
- Time zone: UTC−5 (Eastern (EST))
  - Summer (DST): UTC−4 (EDT)
- ZIP Code: 17033
- Area code: 717
- FIPS code: 34-71385
- GNIS feature ID: 1176895
- Website: hersheypa.com

Pennsylvania Historical Marker
- Designated: March 2, 2003

Hershey is an unincorporated community and census-designated place (CDP) in Derry Township, Dauphin County, Pennsylvania, United States. It is home to the Hershey Company, which was founded by candy magnate Milton S. Hershey, and Hersheypark, an amusement park.

The community is located 14 miles (23 km) east of Harrisburg and is part of the Harrisburg metropolitan area. Hershey has no legal status as an incorporated municipality, and all its municipal services are provided by Derry Township. The population was 13,858 at the 2020 census.

Hershey is also located 68.8 miles (110.7 km) north of Baltimore, Maryland, 75.2 miles (121.0 km) southwest of Allentown and 94.5 miles (152.1 km) northwest of Philadelphia.

== History ==
=== Early settlement ===
In the beginning of its colonization, many of Pennsylvania’s settlers occupied the land not through acquiring the legal rights, but by building on any unclaimed land they found.

In 1681, King Charles II granted a large piece of his North American land holdings along the North Atlantic Ocean coast to William Penn to offset debts he owed Penn's father, the admiral and politician Sir William Penn. Penn's promise of spiritual tolerance and governmental participation brought many immigrants to the region. The first settlers to live near Hershey came from two distinct nationalities, the Scot-Irish and the German Palatinates.

The Scottish-Irish immigrants left their homelands due to a number of political and economic atrocities by Queen Anne, who persecuted anyone who refused to conform to the Anglican Church. The mountains of Appalachia and the valleys of frontier Pennsylvania drew the attention of these settlers, who were joined by Catholic and Presbyterian Scottish Highlanders who fled due to similar reasons. Naturally, the Scots were clannish, and tended not to mix with the other ethnic groups settling the area at the same time. They were also politically minded and became involved in local governments quickly after settling in the area.

The Scottish-Irish established several Presbyterian churches as they moved westward across the state, including the Derry Presbyterian Church in Old Derry Village near the head of the Spring Creek. Prominent attendants included the Clarks, Campbells, Blacks, Boyds, Roland Chambers, James Hamilton, James Harris, William McCord, John Mitchell, and Malcom Kar. The land on which the present Derry Church is situated was given by John, Thomas, and Richard Penn, the sons of William Penn and Proprietors of Pennsylvania. The old Session House was built in 1732 and enclosed in glass in 1929 for preservation by Milton S. Hershey.

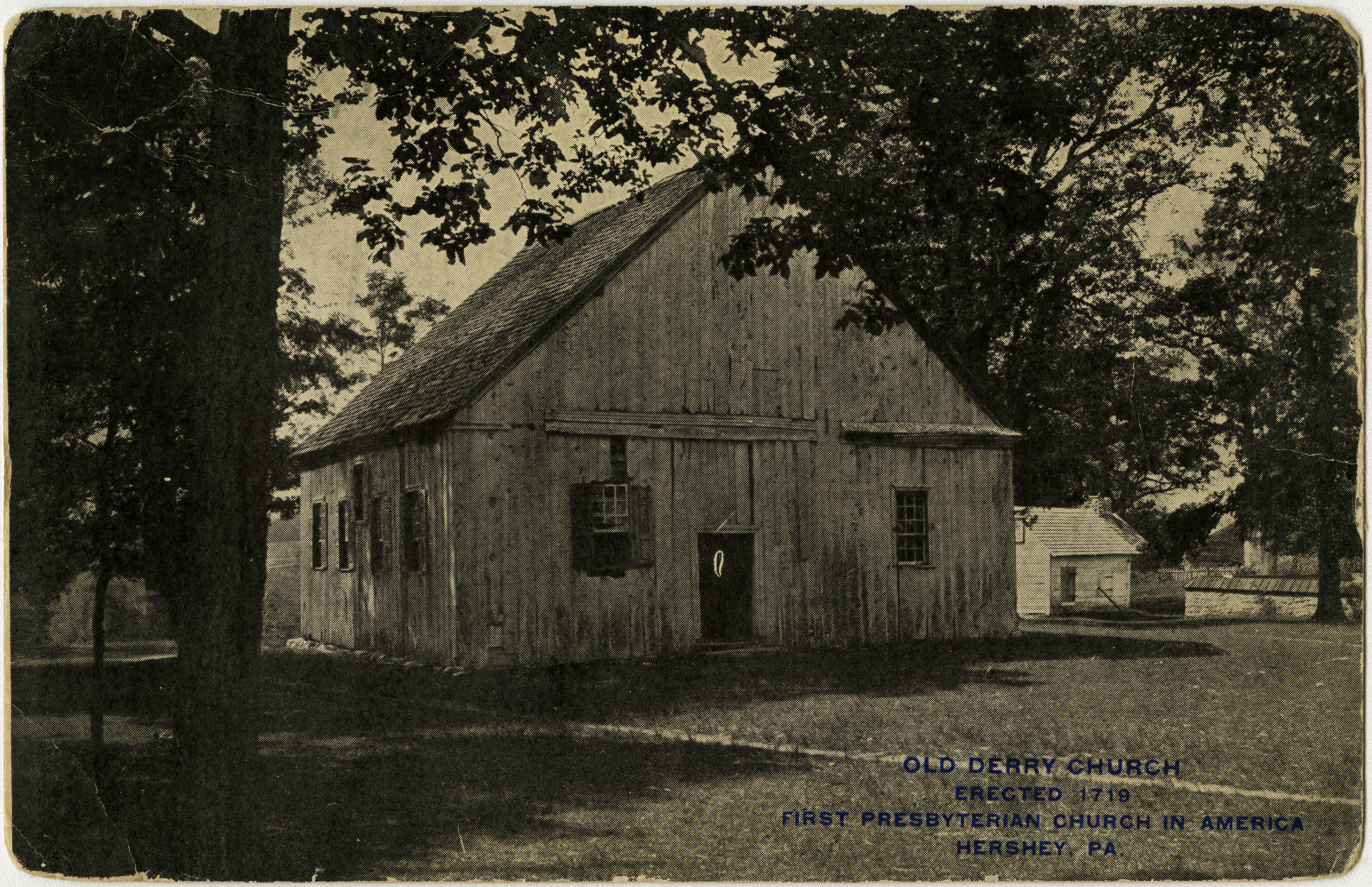
Old Derry Presbyterian Church

Early Scottish-Irish surnames in the Derry Township area included Hayes, Wilson, Harris, Clark, Wallace, McDonald, Logan, Davidson, Wray, McCallen, and Robinson.

The German Palatinates, later called the "Pennsylvania Dutch," had similarly left their homelands for a number of reasons, namely political oppression, religious persecution, and economic poverty. Like the Scottish-Irish, the Germans kept to themselves and did not interfere with settlers of other backgrounds. Most of these settlers were farmers, and they flourished in rural areas. Unlike the Scottish-Irish, the Germans were not politically minded, and they had no qualms with the English governing them. A majority of the Germans did not leave Pennsylvania, but stayed to work the rich soil.

Throughout the parts of Pennsylvania that had already been settled, German was the prominently spoken language, surpassing English. This encouraged more German settlers to lay down roots in Pennsylvania more so than in the other colonies.

The Pennsylvania frontier proved dangerous to early settlers. The French and Indian Wars, which decimated the area, forced the construction of a series of forts along the Blue Mountains. During its most famous stage, the Delawares, who aligned with the French, marched down the Blue Mountains to raid the settlers.

At the time of the American Revolution, the settlers of the Derry Township area were enthusiastic about a war for freedom, as evidenced by early protestors and adoption of a list of patriotic resolves on July 25, 1776, signed by Scottish-Irish and Germans alike.

The land on which Hershey sits was originally patented by James Campbell in the north (in 1741) and James Galbraith in the northwest (in 1744). The center of Hershey was warranted and surveyed to John Carver (in 1761), but that tract of land wasn't patented until April 18, 1878. It was patented by John Snyder, Peter Shenk, Philip Brown, John Bordner, David Lehman, David K. Landis, Anthony Greiner, and Jonas Allwine.

Other communities in the area included Palmstown (now Palmyra), Campbelltown, Millerstown (now Annville), Middletown, and Fredrickstown (now Hummelstown).

==== Transportation ====
Transportation from one settlement to the next was essential if either settlement wanted to grow. Turnpike companies were chartered to create improved roads to better facilitate the movement of goods from town to town. Governor Thomas McKean authorized the formation of the Berks and Dauphin Turnpike in 1805 to connect the cities of Reading and Hummelstown.

The Downingtown, Ephrata, and Harrisburg Pike, which was commonly known as the Horseshoe Pike, was chartered in 1803 and completed in 1819, and ran through Derry.

==== Education ====
The Pennsylvania Germans and Scottish-Irish were hesitant to accept the idea of free or public schools. They respected education, but associated it with the church, not the state. The enactment of the Free School Act in 1834, entitled "An Act to Establish a General System of Education by Common Schools" was the first great victory for public schools. In 1893, free textbooks and supplies were provided by state law in all Pennsylvania public schools. The first compulsory school attendance law for children was enacted in 1895, but there were many legal exceptions. Education has since been served by the Derry Township School District.

=== Founding of Hershey ===
Using the proceeds from the 1900 sale of the Lancaster Caramel Company, Milton S. Hershey acquired farmland roughly 30 miles (50 km) northwest of Lancaster, near his birthplace in Derry Township. The factory was in the center of a dairy farmland near Derry Church, but with Hershey's support: houses, businesses, churches, and a transportation infrastructure accreted around the plant. The area around the factory eventually became known as the company town of Hershey, Pennsylvania.

The town was officially founded in 1903 and completed in 1905, namely for the company’s workers, and their homes had modern amenities such as electricity, indoor plumbing, and central heating. The town had a public trolley system, a free school to educate the children of employees, a free vocational school to train orphaned and underprivileged boys, and later an amusement park, golf courses, community center, hotel, zoo, and a sports area. The purpose was to provide "a perfect American town in a bucolic natural setting, where healthy, right-living, and well-paid workers lived in safe, happy homes."

In 1905, Milton Hershey began constructing a theme park for his workers which he named "Hershey Park." It officially opened to the public on Memorial Day, May 30, 1906. Located along the banks of Spring Creek, the park was an ideal spot for picnicking, boating, and canoeing, and featured graceful trees and wooded groves. ZooAmerica, formerly the Hershey Zoo, was added to the park in 1910 and housed Milton Hershey's own animals.

The public trolley system was built in 1908 in the form of a street railway and provided the citizens with easy access to other towns and cities in the area. On 15 November 1909, Milton and Catherine Hershey created and endowed the Hershey Industrial School, now the Milton Hershey School. Hershey, who had no children of his own, sought to provide underprivileged boys with the education and skills needed to succeed in the real world.

Milton S. Hershey established Hershey Entertainment and Resorts as Hershey Estates in 1927 to distinguish his chocolate manufacturing company from his other business ventures. The Pennsylvania State Police Academy was also opened in Hershey the same year.

=== Growth and tourism ===
Many of the town's structures were built and financed during the Great Depression as part of Hershey's "Great Building Campaign" to provide jobs. This helped transform the town into a major tourist attraction that continues to grow in popularity each year.

Hershey's projects include:

- Hershey Country Club, opened 1930
- The Hotel Hershey, opened May 1933
- Hershey Theatre, opened September 1933
- Hersheypark Arena, opened 1936
- Hersheypark Stadium, opened May 1939

From 1930 to 1936, Milton Hershey had spent more than $10 million on building up Hershey, Pennsylvania, but he reduced the hours of his employees and stopped paying annual bonuses. In 1937, a strike and occupation at the chocolate factory ended violently when some strikers were severely beaten by a rally loyal to the company.

Hershey established The M.S. Hershey Foundation in 1935 as a small, private charitable foundation to provide educational and cultural opportunities for local residents. The foundation supports the Hershey Story Museum, originally the Hershey American Indian Museum, Hershey Gardens, Hershey Theatre, and Hershey Community Archives.

=== Since the 1960s ===
In 1903, Hershey consisted of around 700 people. By 1920, the population had increased to 1,500 people. By 1960, the population had increased to over 7,000 people.

In 1963, the Milton S. Hershey Medical Center was founded as the site of Pennsylvania State University’s College of Medicine. The college enrolled its first students in 1967 and has conferred 2,182 Doctor of Medicine degrees. The Hershey Motor Lodge (now the Hershey Lodge) was opened in 1967 and is known as "The Great American Meeting Place."

== Geography ==
Hershey is located in southeastern Dauphin County, in the center and eastern parts of Derry Township. It is bordered to the east by Palmdale (also in Derry Township) and by Campbelltown (in South Londonderry Township, Lebanon County). To the west is the borough of Hummelstown. Over half the population of Derry Township lives within the Hershey CDP.

According to the U.S. Census Bureau, the Hershey CDP has a total area of 14.4 square miles (37.3 km^{2}), of which 14.4 square miles (37.2 km^{2}) is land and 0.058 square miles (0.15 km^{2}), or 0.41%, is water.

== Demographics ==
Historical population
Census	Pop.	Note	%±
2000	12,771		—
2010	14,257		11.6%
2020	13,858		−2.8%
U.S. Decennial Census

=== 2020 census ===
As of the 2020 census, Hershey had a population of 13,858. The median age was 39.1 years. 18.6% of residents were under the age of 18 and 18.8% of residents were 65 years of age or older. For every 100 females there were 91.3 males, and for every 100 females age 18 and over there were 89.6 males age 18 and over.

95.1% of residents lived in urban areas, while 4.9% lived in rural areas.

There were 5,550 households in Hershey, of which 25.0% had children under the age of 18 living in them. Of all households, 43.6% were married-couple households, 19.0% were households with a male householder and no spouse or partner present, and 31.8% were households with a female householder and no spouse or partner present. About 36.2% of all households were made up of individuals and 16.4% had someone living alone who was 65 years of age or older.

There were 5,968 housing units, of which 7.0% were vacant. The homeowner vacancy rate was 1.9% and the rental vacancy rate was 6.0%.

Racial composition as of the 2020 census
Race	Number	Percent
White	10,260	74.0%
Black or African American	791	5.7%
American Indian and Alaska Native	22	0.2%
Asian	1,061	7.7%
Native Hawaiian and Other Pacific Islander	11	0.1%
Some other race	867	6.3%
Two or more races	846	6.1%
Hispanic or Latino (of any race)	1,547	11.2%

=== 2010 census ===
As of the 2010 census, there were 14,257 people living there. Hershey was made up of 83.5% White, 6.6% Asian, 6.2% African American, and 3.5% in other categories. 3.4% identify as Hispanic or Latino.

== Transportation ==
U.S. Route 422, also known as Chocolate Avenue, runs through the center of Hershey, and U.S. Route 322, also known as Governor Road, passes south of the center. The two highways merge at the western end of Hershey at an interchange with Pennsylvania Route 39. US 422 leads east 43 miles (69 km) to Reading, and US 322 leads southeast 28 miles (45 km) to Ephrata and west 15 miles (24 km) to Harrisburg, the state capital. Route 39 provides access to Hersheypark and Chocolate World, located in the northern part of the CDP, and continues north 6 miles (10 km) to Interstate 81 at Skyline View.

Hershey is accessible via Harrisburg International Airport, approximately 12 miles (19 km) to the southwest. Amtrak's Keystone Service provides frequent rail service to the nearby towns of Middletown (9 miles), Harrisburg (13 miles) and Elizabethtown Amtrak Station (11 miles), as well as its eastern terminus in Philadelphia (95 miles). CAT and LT (formerly known as COLT) provide bus service.

From 1944 to 1981, Hershey had its own small general aviation airport on the front lawn of the Milton Hershey Middle School.

== Climate ==
Hershey has a humid continental climate (Dfa), as is very common in Pennsylvania. Temperatures can reach up to 95 °F (35 °C) in the summer, and fall below 20 °F (−7 °C) in the winter. The hardiness zones are 6b and 7a.

Climate data for Hershey, Pennsylvania
Month	Jan	Feb	Mar	Apr	May	Jun	Jul	Aug	Sep	Oct	Nov	Dec	Year
Mean daily maximum °F (°C)	36 (2)	40 (4)	44 (7)	62 (17)	71 (22)	80 (27)	84 (29)	82 (28)	75 (24)	64 (18)	52 (11)	40 (4)	61 (16)
Mean daily minimum °F (°C)	20 (−7)	23 (−5)	29 (−2)	39 (4)	48 (9)	58 (14)	62 (17)	61 (16)	53 (12)	42 (6)	33 (1)	25 (−4)	41 (5)
Average precipitation inches (mm)	2.96 (75)	2.77 (70)	3.34 (85)	3.68 (93)	4.10 (104)	4.15 (105)	4.56 (116)	3.64 (92)	3.93 (100)	3.49 (89)	3.49 (89)	3.34 (85)	43.45 (1,103)

== Education ==
- Derry Township School District, public school district
  - Hershey High School, public high school
- The Vista School, state-approved, private school for autistic students aged 3 to 21 years
- Milton Hershey School, private philanthropic school founded in 1909 by chocolate magnate Milton Hershey to serve poor children. Currently serves children from pre-kindergarten through 12th grade
- Penn State University College of Medicine, a medical school affiliated with Hershey Medical Center

== Sports ==
Club	League	Venue	Established	Championships won
Hershey Bears	AHL, Ice hockey	Giant Center	1932	13
Hershey FC	NPSL, Soccer	Hersheypark Stadium Hershey High School	2013	0

Hershey was once home to the Hershey Wildcats of the A-League, a professional soccer team. The team folded after the 2001 season when its owners decided that it would not be successful financially. The Wildcats were named after a popular roller coaster in Hersheypark. Hershey was also home to the Hershey Impact over the NPSL indoor soccer league.

National Basketball Association player Wilt Chamberlain scored 100 points for the Philadelphia Warriors in a regular season game played at Hersheypark Arena in 1962; his effort remains a single-game record for the league.

The Philadelphia Eagles held its preseason training camp at Hersheypark Stadium from 1951–1963 and 1965–1967.

Elizabethtown College hosted the 2015 NCAA Division III Wrestling Championships at the Giant Center.

Christian Pulisic, the American soccer player who plays for AC Milan of Italy’s Serie A and the United States men's national soccer team, is from Hershey.

== Points of interest ==
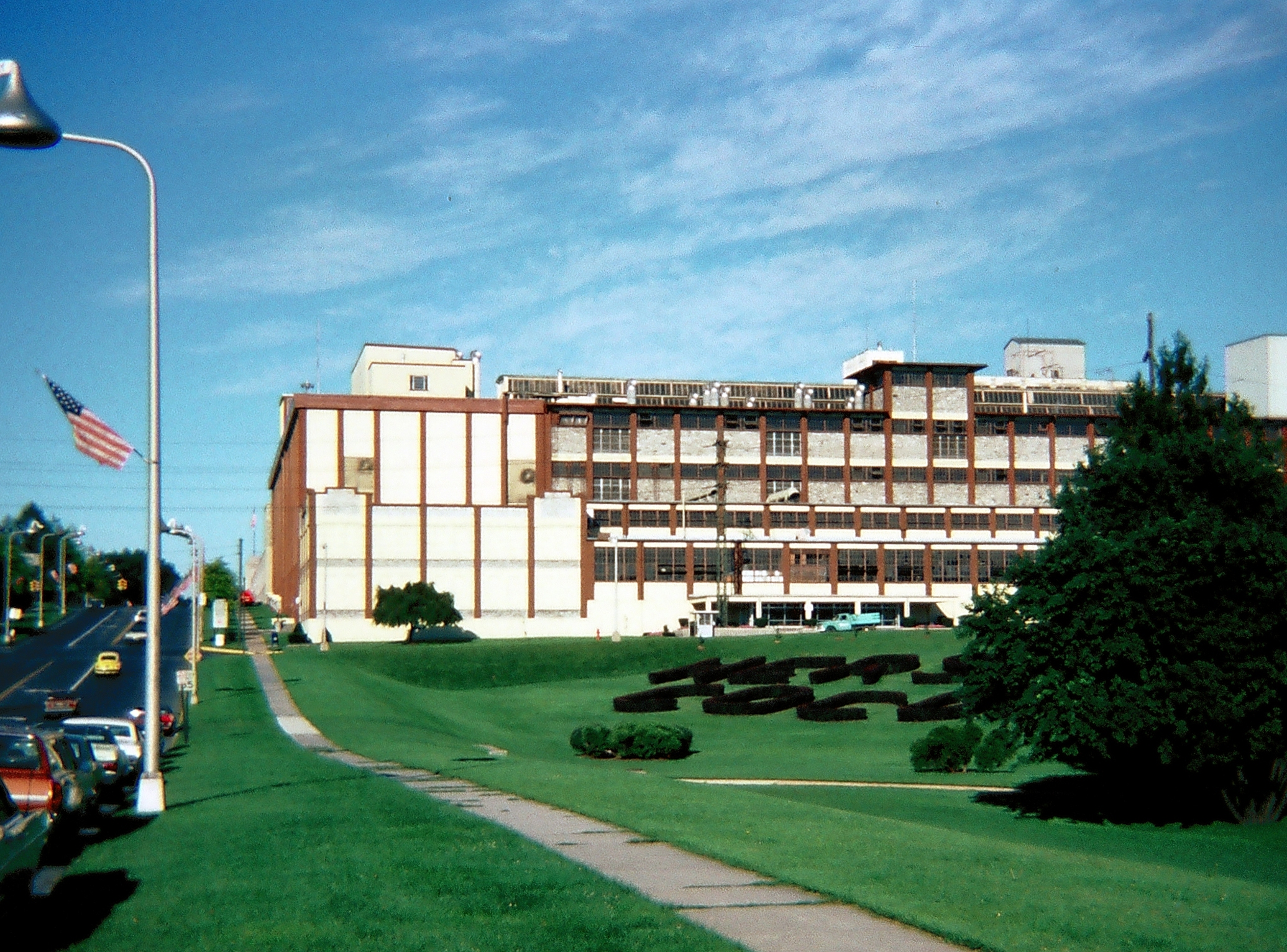
The Hershey Company in August 1976

The community is home to the Hershey Company, which makes the well-known Hershey Bar and Hershey's Kisses and is the parent company of the H. B. Reese Candy Company, manufacturer of Reese's Peanut Butter Cups. Hershey's Chocolate World is a factory store and virtual tour ride of the Hershey Company. The original Hershey Chocolate Factory, located downtown alongside Chocolate Avenue, was closed in 2012 due to high operational costs. Although many of the former factory buildings have been demolished, several were converted to modern office space. The intersection of Chocolate Avenue and Cocoa Avenue is the town center.

Hershey Entertainment and Resorts Company owns and operates Hersheypark, Hersheypark Stadium, and other attractions such as ZooAmerica and Hershey Gardens, and is a major employer of the community and surrounding area. Every October since 1955, the Antique Automobile Club of America have hosted the AACA Eastern Fall Meet here. Usually referred to simply as "Hershey", this is often claimed to be the world's largest automotive swap meet.

The Penn State Milton S. Hershey Medical Center and the Milton Hershey School for underprivileged youth are also located in Hershey.

The Pennsylvania State Police Academy is located north along Hersheypark Drive. In addition, the Derry Township Police Department is a nationally recognized law enforcement agency.

Hershey is also home to four world-class golf courses, a few museums, The Hotel Hershey, and an opulent spa.

Hersheypark Stadium hosts concerts and sporting events, with a capacity of 30,000. It is also the venue of the Cocoa Bean Game between the Hershey High School and Milton S. Hershey High School football teams.

Other points of interet include:

- AACA Museum, operated by the Antique Automobile Club of America
- GIANT Center, home of the Hershey Bears
- Hershey Area Playhouse
- Hershey Cemetery
- Hershey Center for Applied Research
- Hershey Country Club
- Hershey Gardens
- Hershey Lodge and Convention Center
- Hershey Museum
- Hershey Public Library
- Hershey Recreation Center
- Hershey Theatre
- Hershey's Chocolate World
- Hersheypark
- Hersheypark Arena
- Hersheypark Stadium
- Hershey-Derry Township Historical Society
- Hotel Hershey
- Indian Echo Caverns
- Milton Hershey School
- Milton S. Hershey Mansion
- Parkview Cross Country Course
- Tanger Outlets
- The Hershey Story
- Tröegs Brewing Company
- ZooAmerica

== In popular culture ==
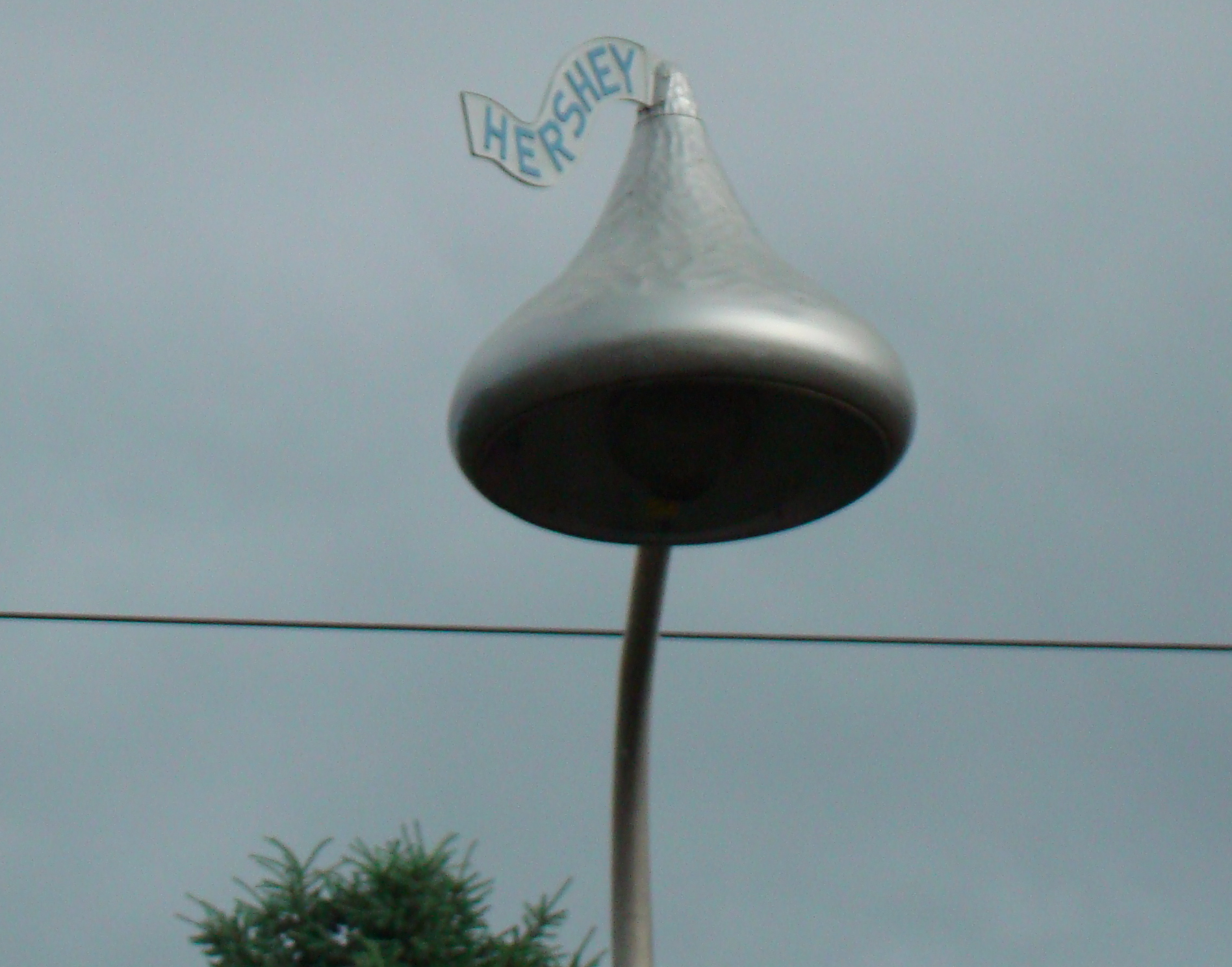
One of Hershey's distinctive kiss-shaped street lamps

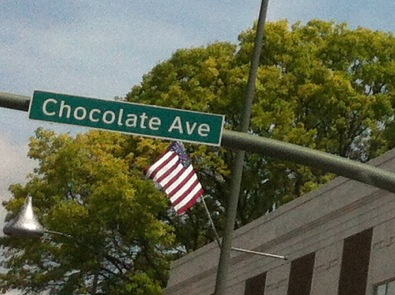
"Chocolate Ave", celebrating Hershey's heritage

Hershey Park plays a large role in the American Dad episode "May the Best Stan Win" where Stan must fight his cyborg clone for the affection of his wife Francine. The episode includes a musical number called "At Hershey Park" sung by a chorus of back-up singers at the park.

In Mad Men, Donald Draper was raised in a brothel in Hershey.

In The Simpsons episode "Homerland", Homer says: "I’ve never prayed to a city in my life and if I did it’d be Hershey, Pennsylvania."

Hershey was also mentioned in The Good Doctor, when it was revealed that Shaun Murphy's (main character) love interest, Lea (played by Paige Spara) is moving to Hershey, Pa. to work in her family's auto body shop.

In the American ensemble procedural series, 9-1-1, Hershey is where siblings Evan "Buck" Buckley (Oliver Stark) and Maddie Buckley (Jennifer Love Hewitt) spent most of their childhoods.

== Notable people ==
- Valarie Allman is a track and field athlete specializing in the discus throw.
- Brian Baker, actor
- John Bilbrey, director at McCormick & Company and former CEO and president of Hershey Company
- Michele Buck, CEO and president of the Hershey Company
- Scott Campbell, professional football player in National Football League (NFL)
- Gigi Cesarè, actress and recording artist
- Deesha Dyer, White House Social Secretary
- Garry Gilliam, former Penn State University and former San Francisco 49ers offensive linesman
- Able Heart, singer and songwriter
- Milton S. Hershey, confectioner and philanthropist and town founder.
- Lois Herr, progressive activist
- Geofrey Hildrew, film & television editor and director
- John Huzvar, professional football player in NFL
- Jules Jordan, film director and actor
- Nellie King, former Major League Baseball pitcher for Pittsburgh Pirates
- Kellen Kulbacki, professional baseball player in Major League Baseball
- George M. Leader, Governor of Pennsylvania
- Trymaine Lee, Pulitzer Prize-winning journalist and national reporter for MSNBC
- Mark Malkoff, comedian and writer
- David Nolan, Stanford University swimmer
- The Ocean Blue, alternative rock band, formed in Hershey.
- Steven Pasquale, television and stage actor
- John D. Payne, state Congressman
- Peppermint, actress and drag queen
- Christian Pulisic, soccer player for AC Milan and United States men's national soccer team
- Da'Vine Joy Randolph, Academy Award-winning actress
- H.B. Reese, inventor of Reese's Peanut Butter Cups and founder of the H.B. Reese Candy Company, lived and built his two candy factories in Hershey.
- Nate Saint, American missionary
- Joe Senser, former NFL tight end for Minnesota Vikings and former board member of the Hershey Trust Company and Hershey Entertainment & Resorts Company
- John B. Sollenberger, sports and entertainment executive
- Andrew Joseph Stack III, who flew a Piper Dakota airplane into an IRS building in Austin, Texas as a tax protest in 2010
- Jodie Steck, photojournalist
- Jay Taylor, professional football player in NFL
- Dave Twardzik, professional basketball player in NBA
- Chris Villarrial, professional football player in the NFL and head football coach at Saint Francis University
- Richard Winters, U.S. Army major
- Michelle Wolf, comedian
- Warren Zeiders, American country singer

== See also ==
- IGI Global, a publishing company based in Hershey
