= John Bilbrey =

American chief executive

John P. Bilbrey ("J.P") was the president and CEO of The Hershey Company from May 17, 2011, to March 2017. Bilbrey is currently the interim chief executive officer for Olaplex, where he was previously the executive officer on the board.

== Career ==
In addition to his work as the president and CEO of The Hershey Company, Bilbrey also is a director of the company. Bilbrey was the interim president and CEO for a month in April and May 2011 after David J. West resigned. He was previously the executive vice president and COO of Hershey from November 2, 2010, until May 17, 2011. He was the president of North America at The Hershey Company from December 2007 until November 2010 and was the senior vice president from November 2005 until November 2010. Before his work at Hershey, he held executive jobs at Mission Foods and Danone Waters of North America Inc. He spent 22 years at The Procter & Gamble Co. where he worked in both U. domestic business and in international assignments.

== Education ==
Bilbrey has a bachelor's degree in psychology from Kansas State University, where he ran track and was a member of Delta Sigma Phi.

== Director roles ==
Bilbrey has been a director at McCormick & Co. Inc. since November 22, 2005, and a director of The Hershey Company since June 2011.
