= Hershey (name) =

Hershey is a surname, given name and nickname. Notable people with the name include:

== Surname ==
- Alfred Hershey (1908–1997), American Nobel Prize–winning bacteriologist and geneticist
- Almira Hershey (1843–1930), American hotel proprietor and property developer, daughter of Benjamin Hershey
- Amos Shartle Hershey (1867–1933), American professor of political science
- Arthur D. Hershey (born 1937), American politician
- Barbara Hershey (born 1948), American actress
- Benjamin Hershey (1813–1893), American lumber and farming magnate
- Frank Hershey (1907–1997), American automobile designer
- Harry B. Hershey (1885–1967), American jurist and politician, Illinois Supreme Court justice
- John W. Hershey (1898–1967), American agroforester
- Laura Ann Hershey (1962–2010), American poet, journalist, speaker, feminist and disability rights activist and consultant
- Lewis Blaine Hershey (1893–1977), US Army general
- Milton S. Hershey (1857–1945), American confectioner and philanthropist, founder of the Hershey Company
- Sara Hershey-Eddy (1837–1911), née Sarah Hershey, American musician, pianist, contralto vocalist, vocal instructor, musical educator and founder of the Hershey School of Musical Art
- Steve Hershey (born 1964), Maryland State Senator
- Therese Tartlon Hershey (1923–2017), American conservationist and environmentalist

== Given name ==
- Hershey Felder, (born 1968), pianist, actor, playwright, composer and producer
- Hershey Friedman (born 1950), Canadian businessman and philanthropist
- Hershey Misener (1878–1966), suffragist and one of the first women elected to the Indiana General Assembly
- Hershey Strosberg, American retired soccer coach

== Nickname ==
- Hiroshi H. Miyamura (1925–2022), US Army soldier and Medal of Honor recipient
- Bill Nershi (born 1961), a founding member and acoustic guitarist for the American band The String Cheese Incident

== See also ==
- Hershey (disambiguation)
