= Hershey =

Hershey may refer to:

== People ==
- Hershey (name), a list of people with the surname, given name or nickname

== Places ==
- Hershey, Nebraska, a village
- Hershey, Pennsylvania, an unincorporated community, home to the American chocolate company
- Hershey, Cuba, also known as Camilo Cienfuegos, a village in Mayabeque province

== Companies and organizations ==
- The Hershey Company, North American chocolate manufacturer
  - Hershey bar, a Hershey product
- Hershey Creamery Company, an unrelated ice cream manufacturer
- Hershey Electric Railway, from Havana to Matanzas, Cuba
- Hershey Trust Company, Milton Hershey's trust
- Hershey Entertainment and Resorts Company, Hershey, Pennsylvania:
  - Hershey Park
  - The Hershey Story

== Schools ==
- Hershey School of Musical Art, Chicago, Illinois
- Hershey High School (Pennsylvania), Hershey, Pennsylvania
- Milton Hershey School, Hershey, Pennsylvania

== Sports ==
- Hershey Open, a PGA golf tournament from 1933 to 1941, played in Hershey, Pennsylvania
- Hershey Bears, a hockey team based in Hershey, Pennsylvania
- Hershey FC, a soccer club based in Hershey, Pennsylvania, from 1997 to 2001
- Hershey Impact, a soccer club based in Hershey, Pennsylvania, from 1988 to 1991
- Hershey Wildcats, a soccer club based in Hershey, Pennsylvania

== Other uses ==
- Hershey fonts, an influential collection of computer fonts developed in 1967
- The Hotel Hershey, Hershey, Pennsylvania
- Hershey: Milton S. Hershey's Extraordinary Life of Wealth, Empire, and Utopian Dreams, 2006 biography by Michael D'Antonio
- Judge Hershey, a character in Judge Dredd
- Hershey (film), a 2026 biographical film about Milton S. Hershey

== See also ==
- Hershey's (disambiguation)
- Mississauga Sports and Entertainment Centre, formerly Hershey Centre, a sports and entertainment complex in Mississauga, Ontario, Canada
- Hershey House, Perry Township, Indiana, on the National Register of Historic Places
- Hershey Ridge
- Hershey Run
- Herschi, a soft drink company in the Netherlands
