= Vatican Hebrew MS 133 =

14th-century Hebrew manuscript of the Jerusalem Talmud

Vatican Hebrew MS 133 (Latin: Vaticanus Ebraeus 133 or Vat. ebr. 133), usually known in Hebrew as the Rome MS (כ״י רומי, K.Y. Romi), is a handwritten manuscript of a portion of the Jerusalem Talmud copied in the late 13th or early 14th centuries, containing approximately a quarter of the entire Jerusalem Talmud, Seder Zerai'm (excluding Tractate Bikkurim) and Tractate Sotah from Seder Nashim.

Vatican Hebrew MS 133 originally belonged to the Heidelberg Palatina collection, acquired in the early 16th-century, and later transferred to Rome in the 17th-century (1622), as a gift to Pope Gregory XV.

== Layout ==
It is written on parchment, each sheet containing two columns (except the last four sheets of parchment which lines run the full-width of each page). There are normally between 36 and 38 lines per column, with the exception of Tractate Sotah that contains between 43 and 46 lines per column. It is a composite work combined into one volume, copied by six different copyists and written in old-style, square Ashkenazi Hebrew script. Sections of the original manuscript were partially destroyed, requiring its owners to replace the damaged or missing parts at different time periods. The original manuscript is preserved at the Vatican Library in Rome. A facsimile edition of the manuscript has been published under the name Jerusalem Talmud: Vatican Manuscript (תלמוד ירושלמי: כתב יד וטיקן), (Note: Talmud Yerushalmi: Ketav Yad Ṿaṭiḳan (1970), [Biblioteca Apostolica Vaticana. Manuscript. Vat. Ebr. 133], Makor: Jerusalem (OCLC 23876507)) but since it lacks 5 out of the total of 6 orders (divisions) prescribed for the Mishnah and Talmud (with the exception of one tractate from Seder Nashim), the manuscript contains only about 1/4 of the entire Jerusalem Talmud. In common Hebrew inscriptions, it is often called the 'Rome manuscript' (כ"י רומי = K.Y. Romi).

== Importance ==
The manuscript, although copied in the late 13th or early 14th centuries, offers scholars only limited value, as it is generally believed to contain many copyist errors. For example, the manuscript containing Seder Zera'im, from which the scribe copied the Rome MS, was defective in that it had missing pages in several places and the scribe copied the pages that were in front of him consecutively, unaware of the deficiencies. (Note: See: Manuscript - Vat. ebr. 133 (Late 13th–early 14th century), Vatican Library (online edition). A sample of some of the missing extracts are as follows: 1) Shevi'it, ch. 3, beginning with מתניתא until את הרבי; 2) Orlah, chs. 2–3, beginning with א"ר יונה until בכל מקום; 3) Ma'aser Sheni, ch. 5, beginning with ר' אחא until כתיב אלה שני'; 4) Ḥallah, ch. 1, beginning with רשב"ל until רשב"ל אמ'; 5) Terumah, end of ch. 1, beginning with לפי שמנן until דההיא.) Most errors, however, are the result of the copyists mistaking one Hebrew character for another Hebrew character, the most common being confusion of the graphemes י (yod) and ו (waw); confusion of ב (bet) and כ (kaph); and confusion of ד (dalet) with ר (resh). Occasionally, two separate letters (such as ינ) were inadvertently joined by the copyist to produce the letter צ.

Nonetheless, some variant readings in the Vatican Hebrew MS 133 are still considered to be insightful, perhaps offering a more correct reading of the Jerusalem Talmud at the time of its compilation. Most critical editions of the Jerusalem Talmud include tables with variant readings, many of which are gleaned from Vat. ebr. 133. In 1909, Ginzberg published an account of the Rome MS's variant readings.

Scholars have pointed out that Vatican Hebrew MS 133 was one of three primary texts used by Jehiel ben Jekuthiel Anav, the copyist of the Leiden MS of the Jerusalem Talmud, but almost all modern editions of the Jerusalem Talmud (including Friedman's Oz ve-Hadar edition published in New York) will cite variant readings from the Vatican Ms., and wherever there are two or more concurring versions (with the Vatican being one of them, along with, say, the Leiden Ms.), that version overrides the Vilna printed edition where a variant reading appears, and such a reading will appear in the modern printed edition of the Jerusalem Talmud published by Friedman (Oz ve-Hadar).

The marginal notes, textual emendations written in the glosses of the Leiden MS, are believed to have been copied from Vat. ebr. 133.

== Selected variants ==
Variant spellings in Tractate Demai 2:1
Page	Vat. ebr. 133
Folio 68v	עד אינן פונדקה דעמודה פונדקה דטביתה עד כפר סבה וצורן ודאר בקיסרין ר' אבהו אמ' בשם ר' יוסה בר חנינה בולבסין הנמכרין בקיסרין הרי אלו אסורין
Page	Leiden MS
Demai 2:1 (Demai 8a)	עד היכן פונדקא דעמודא פונדקא רטיבתא עד כפר סבא וצורן ודאי כקיסרין ר' אבהו בשם ר' יוסי בר חנינא כולכסין הנמכרין בקיסרין הרי אילו אסורים

In Vat. ebr. 133, the spelling of place names has in each case a ה-suffix, instead of an א-suffix. This spelling follows the traditional transcription of Jewish Palestinian Aramaic. In terms of orthography, Vat. ebr. 133 displays a close similarity to the Cairo Geniza fragments of the Jerusalem Talmud. Names of rabbis are written in the old Palestinian style, such as ר' יניי instead of ר' ינאי; ר' יוסה instead of ר' יוסי; ר' ליעזר instead of ר' אליעזר and ר' יודה instead of ר' יהודה. On the other hand, the copyist of the Leiden MS has changed the original script's spelling in many places to conform with the Babylonian style. Vat. ebr. 133 is correct in calling hyacinths bulbosīn, which in the Leiden MS was corrupted to read as kulkosīn.

Variant spellings in Tractate Shevi'it 7:1
Page	Vat. ebr. 133
Folio 102r	ציפרנאי שאלין לר' אמי מהו לחטן בחוחין. א' לון אתון אמרין בשם ר' יוסה בר חנינא אפילו עיליי קינריסה שרי
Page	Old Yemenite fragment
Shevi'it 7:1	צפראיי שאלון לר' אימי מהו לחטן ב[חו]חין. אמ' לון אתון [אמרין בשם רבי חנינה] אפלו עלי קינרסייה שריי
Page	Leiden MS
Shevi'it 7:1 (Shevi'it 18b)	ציפריי שאלון לר' אימי מהו לחטן בחוטין אמ' לון אתון אמרין בשם ר' חנינא עלי קנרסייה שרי

The Talmud relates a story about the inhabitants of Sepphoris who enquired concerning grains of wheat and whether or not it was permissible for them on the Seventh Year to produce a clean, white flour (a kind of "bleaching of the wheat", לחטן) by covering the grain with stratified layers of a green herb, in this case, with the green foliage of thorny plants (חוחין) in order to induce by heat and evaporation the slow destruction of the dark outer kernels containing the germ and the bran, leaving only the white inner-kernel. (Note: The question was asked since, normally during the Seventh Year, it is not permitted to bring destruction upon wild herbs and plants, seeing that they are intended for animal consumption.) Both Vat. ebr. 133 and the old Yemenite fragment of the Jerusalem Talmud (Shevi'it 7:1) have written חוחין (ḥōḥīn) for the thorny plants used to do this, which the Leiden MS apparently corrupted to read חוטין (ḥūṭīn).
