= Hershey's =

Hershey's may refer to:

- The Hershey Company, the chocolate manufacturer, commonly called Hershey's
- Hershey's Ice Cream or Hershey Creamery Company
- Hershey's Chocolate World, several visitor centers which started in Hershey, Pennsylvania, US

== See also ==
- List of products manufactured by The Hershey Company
- Hershey (disambiguation)
