= Moed =

Second Order of the Mishnah and Talmud

Seder Moed (Hebrew: סדר מועד, romanized: Sēder Môʿēd, lit. "Order of Appointed Time") is the second of the six orders, or major divisions, of the Mishnah, Tosefta, and the Talmud, and primarily deals with the laws and observances of holidays such as Shabbat, Yom Kippur, Rosh Hashanah and Pesach.

== Topics ==
Moed deals principally with the laws of the Sabbath and the Jewish festivals, establishing the sacred rhythm of the Jewish calendar. It explains and elaborates upon the Torah commandments regarding the prohibitions of labor (Melakha) on holy days, the specific rituals and liturgies assigned to the festivals, and the duties of the individual and the community regarding the Temple service on these dates. These laws are dealt with in twelve tractates, each of which concerns a separate aspect of the general subject for which this Order is named.

One explanation for the name of the Order is given in the Talmud itself (Shabbat 31a), by Shimon ben Lakish, who homiletically states that the second of the six terms in a verse in Isaiah (Isaiah 33:6) – the word ittecha "your times" – corresponds to Seder Moed. This designation is seen as addressing how the diverse regulations of the Sabbath, holidays, and distinct Temple dues came to be grouped under the single banner of "Appointed Times." According to Rashi, the foremost Talmudic commentator (1040–1105 CE), this term specifically refers to the festivals which are fixed at set times in the year.

== Content ==
Moed comprises twelve tractates, with a total of 88 chapters, as follows:

1. Shabbat or Shabbath (שבת) ("Sabbath") deals with the 39 prohibitions of "work" on the Shabbat. 24 chapters.
2. Eruvin (ערובין) ("Mixtures") deals with the Eruv or Sabbath-bound - a category of constructions/delineations that alter the domains of the Sabbath for carrying and travel. 10 chapters.
3. Pesahim (פסחים) ("Passover Festivals") deals with the prescriptions regarding the Passover and the paschal sacrifice. 10 chapters.
4. Shekalim (שקלים) ("Shekels") deals with the collection of the half-Shekel as well as the expenses and expenditure of the Temple. 8 chapters
5. Yoma (יומא) ("The Day")—also called "Kippurim" or "Yom ha-Kippurim" ("Day of Atonement")—deals with the prescriptions Yom Kippur, especially the ceremony by the Kohen Gadol. 8 chapters.
6. Sukkah (סוכה) ("Booth") deals with the festival of Sukkot (the Feast of Tabernacles) and the Sukkah itself. Also deals with the Four Species (Lulav, Etrog, Hadass, Aravah — Palm branch, Citron, Myrtle, Willow) which are waved on Sukkot. 5 chapters.
7. Beitza (ביצה) ("Egg")—now named after its first word, but originally called Yom Tov ("Holidays")—deals chiefly with the rules to be observed on Yom Tov. 5 chapters.
8. Rosh Hashanah (ראש השנה) ("New Year") deals chiefly with the regulation of the calendar by the new moon, and with the services of the festival of Rosh Hashanah. 4 chapters.
9. Ta'anit (תענית) ("Fasting") deals chiefly with the special fast-days in times of drought or other untoward occurrences. 4 chapters
10. Megillah (מגילה) ("Scroll") contains chiefly regulations and prescriptions regarding the reading of the scroll of Esther at Purim, and the reading of other passages from the Torah and Neviim in the synagogue. 4 chapters.
11. Mo'ed Katan (מועד קטן) ("Little Festival") deals with Chol HaMoed, the intermediate festival days of Pesach and Sukkot. 3 chapters.
12. Hagigah (חגיגה) ("Festival Offering") deals with the Three Pilgrimage Festivals (Passover, Shavuot, Sukkot) and the pilgrimage offering that men were supposed to bring in Jerusalem. 3 chapters.

The Jerusalem Talmud has a Gemara on each of the tractates, while in the Babylonian, only that on Shekalim is missing. However, in most printed editions of the Babylonian Talmud (as well as the Daf Yomi cycle), the Jerusalem Gemara to Shekalim is included.

In the Babylonian Talmud the treatises of the order Mo'ed are arranged as follows: Shabbat, 'Erubin, Pesachim, Rosh ha-Shanah, Yoma, Sukkah, Beitzah, Hagigah, Mo'ed Katan, Ta'anit, Megillah; while the sequence in the Jerusalem Talmud is Shabbat, Eruvin, Pesachim, Yoma, Sheqalim, Sukkah, Rosh ha-Shanah, Beitzah, Ta'anit, Megillah, Hagigah, Mo'ed' Katan.

On the Festivals, some have the custom to learn the Tractate in this Order which details the laws of that respective festival (e.g. one would learn Tractate Rosh Hashanah on the holiday of Rosh Hashanah).
