= Hershey Friedman =

Canadian billionaire businessman and philanthropist

- Born: 1950 (age 75–76); Montreal
- Occupation: Businessman Philanthropist
- Children: 6

Hershey Friedman (born 1950) is a Canadian billionaire businessman and philanthropist. His business concerns span the plastics packaging business and kosher meat in North America as well as luxury real estate development and Jewish books in Israel.

== Early life ==
Hershey Friedman was born in 1950 in Montreal, Quebec. His parents, Yisroel D. and Elza Friedman, owned a textile company. His father was paralysed in a car accident in 1960, when Friedman was ten years old. He has two brothers.

Friedman was raised as an Orthodox Jew. He attended Yeshivas Ner Yisroel near Baltimore and Beit Shraga in Monsey, New York. He later studied law and accounting in Montreal.

== Career ==
Friedman started his career by working for his family textile company. By 1982, he acquired a plastics packaging business. By 2014, Friedman told The Jerusalem Post, "we are the largest in North America, packaging Hershey’s chocolates, Pepsi, Nestle, Elle Candy, the famous Entenmann’s donuts, McCain’s fries, as well as larger and smaller companies internationally and locally. We’re also probably the largest bread-bag producer."

Friedman purchased Azorim, a real estate development company which builds luxury apartments in Israel, from Shaya Boymelgreen in 2009–2011. The company built the Beeri-Nehardea Tower; it also planned to build the Elite Tower, but the project was discontinued.

Friedman purchased Agriprocessors, a kosher meat company based in Iowa, USA in 2009. Shortly after, he renamed it Agri Star Meat and Poultry. All employees are E-Verified.

Friedman is the co-owner of "Dun & Bradstreet, Fourier, which produces solutions for scientific education, and CVD, a development company."

Friedman is a billionaire.

== Philanthropy ==
Friedman is a philanthropist who contributes to charities, hospitals and yeshivas. He also invests heavily in funding large-scale projects of publishing holy seforim and is the chief patron of the Babylonian Talmud (Vilna Edition Shas), the Jerusalem Talmud, Shulchan Aruch and Mishna Berura published by the Oz Vehadar institute. These editions are called 'Friedman edition'. The cost of the Babylonian Talmud project was over $20 million.

In 2023, Friedman continued his legacy of philanthropy by offering fully furnished apartments through his real estate company Azorim to evacuees of the conflict in southern Israel, free of charge. His Agri Star meat business also facilitated shipments of kosher, shelf-stable food to soldiers on the front lines. These actions reflect his commitment to both humanitarian aid and Jewish communal support.

== Personal life ==
Friedman is married to Raisy Stuhl since 1975. They have six married children, all of whom work for his businesses.

Friedman resides in Montreal. He spends one week every month in Israel.

== See also ==
- History of the Jews in Montreal
