= Ada Weigel Powers =

American composer, pianist and playwright

Ada Elvira Weigel Powers (30 May 1863 - 6 Oct 1947) was an American composer, pianist, and playwright who composed songs and music for ballet, piano, and violin.

Powers was born in Watertown, New York, to Elvira Ada Kane and Samuel Mann Weigel. Little is known about her education. She married John Orville John Powers in 1897 and they had two boys and two girls.

Powers’ compositions were performed by baritone David Bispham and organist Clarence Eddy, with whom she collaborated on “Shepherd’s Song.” Her works were published by Edward Schuberth & Company, and included:

== Ballet ==
- Slavonic Dance (string orchestra)

== Chamber ==
- Exile Song (violin and piano)

== Piano ==
- Clown’s Serenade
- May Day Dance
- Miniature Dance
- Shepherd’s Song
- Song of the Wildflowers
- Souvenir
- Story of Long Ago
- Three Compositions for Pianoforte

== Plays ==
- The Scar
- The Window

== Vocal ==
- “Chanson d’Amour”
- “Elaine” (baritone and piano; text Alfred Lord Tennyson)
- “Jester’s Drinking Song” (text by Powers; music by George E. Shea)
- “Last Invocation” (text by Walt Whitman)
- “Shepherd’s Song” (text by Powers; music by Clarence Eddy)
- “Thou Art Like a Flower” (text by Heinrich Heine)
- “Weep Not for the Dead”
