= Benjamin Hershey =

American businessman (1813–1893)

Benjamin Hershey (10 April 1813 – 24 August 1893) was a lumber and farming magnate in the U.S. states of Iowa and Nebraska during the middle to late 19th century.

He was born in Lancaster County, Pennsylvania, a distant cousin of Milton S. Hershey, founder of The Hershey Company. Their common ancestor was Christian Hershe (Hershey), who was born about 1664 in Bern, Switzerland, and died about 1720 in Lancaster County. Hershey had four children: Sara, who founded Hershey School of Musical Art; Mary; Elizabeth; and Almira, who went on to become a prominent citizen of Los Angeles, California and owner of the Hollywood Hotel. He died in Muscatine County, Iowa.

== Early years and education ==
Benjamin Hershey of Muscatine, Iowa, had for forty years prior to his decease, in 1893, been recognized as one of the more prominent lumbermen of the Mississippi River. He was born in Manor Township, Lancaster County, Pennsylvania, April 10, 1813, to Joseph and Hester (Hostetter) Hershey. Upon the father's side the family was of Swiss origin, and its advent in America dates from early colonial times. Upon the maternal side, he was of German descent, and the family of H'ostetter was among the settlers of Pennsylvania prior to the revolutionary war. Benjamin, the second of a family of five children, received a common school education.

== Career ==
At the age of nineteen made an extended tour through the west, so far as the eastern boundary of Illinois. This trip occupied three months, a greater portion of it having been accomplished on horseback. Returning to Pennsylvania, in company with a drover who was taking a herd of cattle to the eastern market, he settled down upon the farm which, at his father's death, came into his possession, and for 18 years, operated it successfully, raising and owning some of the finest blooded horses in the state.

In 1851, Hershey removed west to Muscatine, his family following him in the succeeding year. In May, 1853, he rented a small sawmill in South Muscatine, which he afterwards purchased and operated until 1857, when he proceeded to build a mill costing US$70,000 and containing four gangs of saws, in addition to a mulay used for siding down the larger logs. This mill was subsequently enlarged until an annual capacity of 50,000,000 feet (15,000,000 m) was reached. Hershey was recognized by the sawmill fraternity as the pioneer in the use of thin gang saws, running with satisfactory results as early as 1876, saws of eighteen-gauge thickness making kerf of but one-eighth inch. About 1880, he purchased the Burdick mill, or what was then known as the lower mill, in South Muscatine, which he practically rebuilt, increasing its capacity almost to that of the upper mill; and, in addition, he purchased a mill site on Lake St. Croix, at Stillwater, Minnesota, and there erected another mill with a capacity of 25,000,000 feet (7,600,000 m) per annum, the product of which was also for a number of years marketed at Muscatine, being rafted and towed to that point. He was one of the few operators of the Mississippi River Logging Company and one of the larger shareholders in it and in the different concerns with which it is allied. In 1875, he incorporated the Hershey Lumber Company with a capital stock of $200,000, and, with a controlling interest in the stock, was elected president, an office which he continued to hold until his death, in 1893, when he was succeeded by Thomas Irvine. In addition, he was largely interested in similar undertakings in the south, being president and principal owner in the Hershey Land and Lumber Company of Sargent, Missouri and of the Ozark Lumber Company of Winona, Missouri two of the largest lumber concerns in that state.

== Personal life ==
Hershey was married in 1836 to Miss Elizabeth Witmer of Lancaster County, Pennsylvania. By this union, Hershey had four children, Sarah, Mary Amanda, Elizabeth and Mira. Elizabeth died in early maidenhood, at Muscatine in 1856, and Amanda died in Munich, Bavaria, where she had gone to complete her studies, in December, 1876. Prior to going abroad she had for several years been chief accountant in her father's office, and in that capacity will be pleasantly remembered by many of the early lumbermen of Iowa. For several years past, after completing her studies abroad, Mira has taken an active interest in the operations of the Hershey Lumber Company and has held office therein as secretary and vice-president. The eldest daughter, Sara, married Clarence Eddy, organist of Chicago. After having studied in London, Berlin and Milan, she returned to Chicago and established the Hershey School of Musical Art, an institution that ranked among the foremost in the country, and which was domiciled in the Hershey Music Hall on Madison Street, a building erected by Benjamin Hershey expressly for its use. Hershey died at Chicago in the summer of 1893. He was buried at Muscatine, where, two years later, his wife was buried.

== Bibliography ==
- Hotchkiss, George Woodward (1898). History of the Lumber and Forest Industry of the Northwest (Public domain ed.). G.W. Hotchkiss & Company.
