= Shekalim (tractate) =

Tractate of the order Moed of the Mishnah

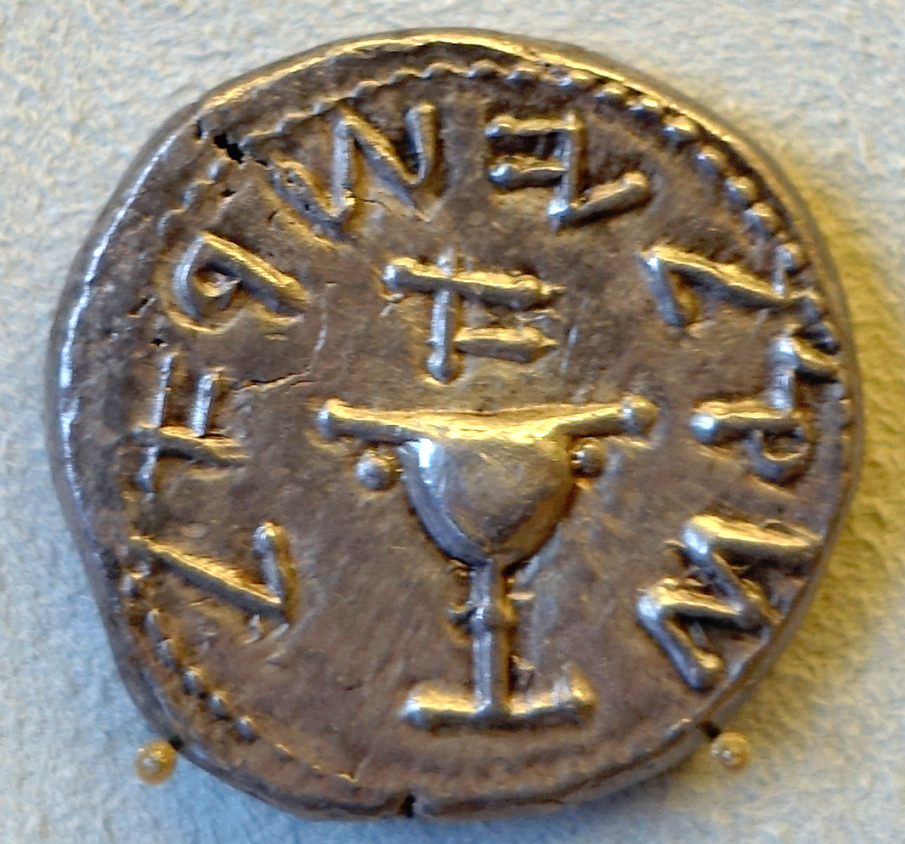
- Ancient shekel coin c.66-67 CE, of the type used during the First Jewish Revolt against Rome.

Tractate of the Talmud
- Seder: Moed
- Number of mishnahs: 52
- Chapters: 8
- Jerusalem Talmud pages: 33
- Tosefta chapters: 3

Shekalim is the fourth tractate in the order of Moed in the Mishnah. Its main subject is the half-shekel tax that ancient Jews paid every year to make possible the maintenance and proper functioning of the Temple in Jerusalem.

There is no Gemara about the treatise in the Babylonian Talmud, but there is one in the Jerusalem Talmud, and the latter is often printed in editions of the Babylonian Talmud. It is the only tractate in Seder Moed not included in the Babylonian Talmud.

== History ==
When Daniel Bomberg published the editio princeps (first printed edition) of the complete Babylonian Talmud from 1519 to 1523, he also included many tractates of Mishnah for which there was no tractate in the Babylonian Talmud. Shekalim, published by Bomberg in 1522, was the only such tractate for which he included the Jerusalem Talmud version of the tractate in his 44-volume work, though he never explained why this was case. The Jerusalem Talmud version of Shekalim has since been included in subsequent printed versions of the Babylonian Talmud.

When Rabbi Meir Shapiro initiated the Daf Yomi cycle on the first day of Rosh Hashanah in 1923, he included a version of Shekalim that had the 12 pages included in the Zhitomir edition of the Talmud, though this has since been changed to the 21-page version used in the Vilna Edition Shas; it differs from the 11 pages in Bomberg's printing and is the only tractate where the pagination used in the Daf Yomi cycle has changed. Study of Shekalim in the first Daf Yomi began on November 27, 1924, with daf 2 (the first printed folio page) and concluded with daf 13 on December 8, 1924. The change from 12 pages for Shekalim to 21 pages was made in 1975 as part of the eighth Daf Yomi cycle, increasing the total length of the cycle from 2,702 days to its present length of 2,711.

== Commentaries ==
In the early 1800s, Yisroel ben Shmuel of Shklov published Mishnas Eliyahu and Hagahos Ha'gra, a series of commentaries from the Vilna Gaon on tractate Shekalim that he organized for printing, along with Tiklin Chadtin, which included his own commentary on the tractate. These three texts have been incorporated into the Vilna Edition Shas version of tractate Shekalim.

== Chapters ==
There are eight chapters in this tractate, as follows:

1. בְּאֶחָד בַּאֲדָר (Be'echad Ba'adar) --- This chapter is concerned with dates of the payment of the tax and who would pay it. The tax was collected throughout the month of Adar. Women, slaves, and minors were not required to pay the tax but could do so if they wished; pagans and Samaritans were not allowed to pay at all.
2. מְצָרְפִין שְׁקָלִים (Metzrfin Shekalim)
3. בִּשְׁלשָׁה פְּרָקִים (Bishlosha Perakim)
4. הַתְּרוּמָה (Haterumah)
5. אֵלּוּ הֵן הַמְמֻנִּין (Elu Hen Hamemunin)
6. שְלשָׁה עָשָר שוֹפָרוֹת (Shloshah Asar Shofarot)
7. מָעוֹת שֶׁנִּמְצְאוּ (Ma'ot Shenimtze'u)
8. כָּל הָרֻקִּין (Kol Harukin)
