= Hershey School of Musical Art =

Defunct school in Chicago, Illinois, USA

Hershey School of Musical Art was an American school located in Chicago, Illinois.

== History ==
It was established within the Hershey Music Hall in 1875 by Sara Hershey and William Smythe Babcock Mathews, attaining special success in its departments of organ, voice, and composition. Clarence Eddy was general director almost from the first, and it was here that in 1877-79 he gave a series of 100 organ recitals without repeating any work. In 1879, Hershey and Eddy married, and in 1885, they discontinued the School.

== Hershey Music Hall ==
Hershey Music Hall was located at 83 & 85 Madison Street. It was built by Sara Hershey's father, Benjamin. Situated opposite McVicker's Theater, it was capable of seating 800 to 1,000 persons. It was furnished with a three manual concert organ built by Johnson & Son, and a Stoneway and Sons' Centennial Grand Piano.

== Bibliography ==
- The Courier (1881). Musical Courier (Public domain ed.). Blumenberg & Floersheim.
- Dwight, John S. (1878). Dwight's Journal of Music (Public domain ed.). Boston: Oliver Ditson & Company.
- Grove, George; Fuller-Maitland, John Alexander (1922). Grove's Dictionary of Music and Musicians. Supplement. Presse. p. 239.
- Hotchkiss, George Woodward (1898). History of the Lumber and Forest Industry of the Northwest (Public domain ed.). G.W. Hotchkiss & Company.
