= Clarence Eddy =

American musician (1851–1937)

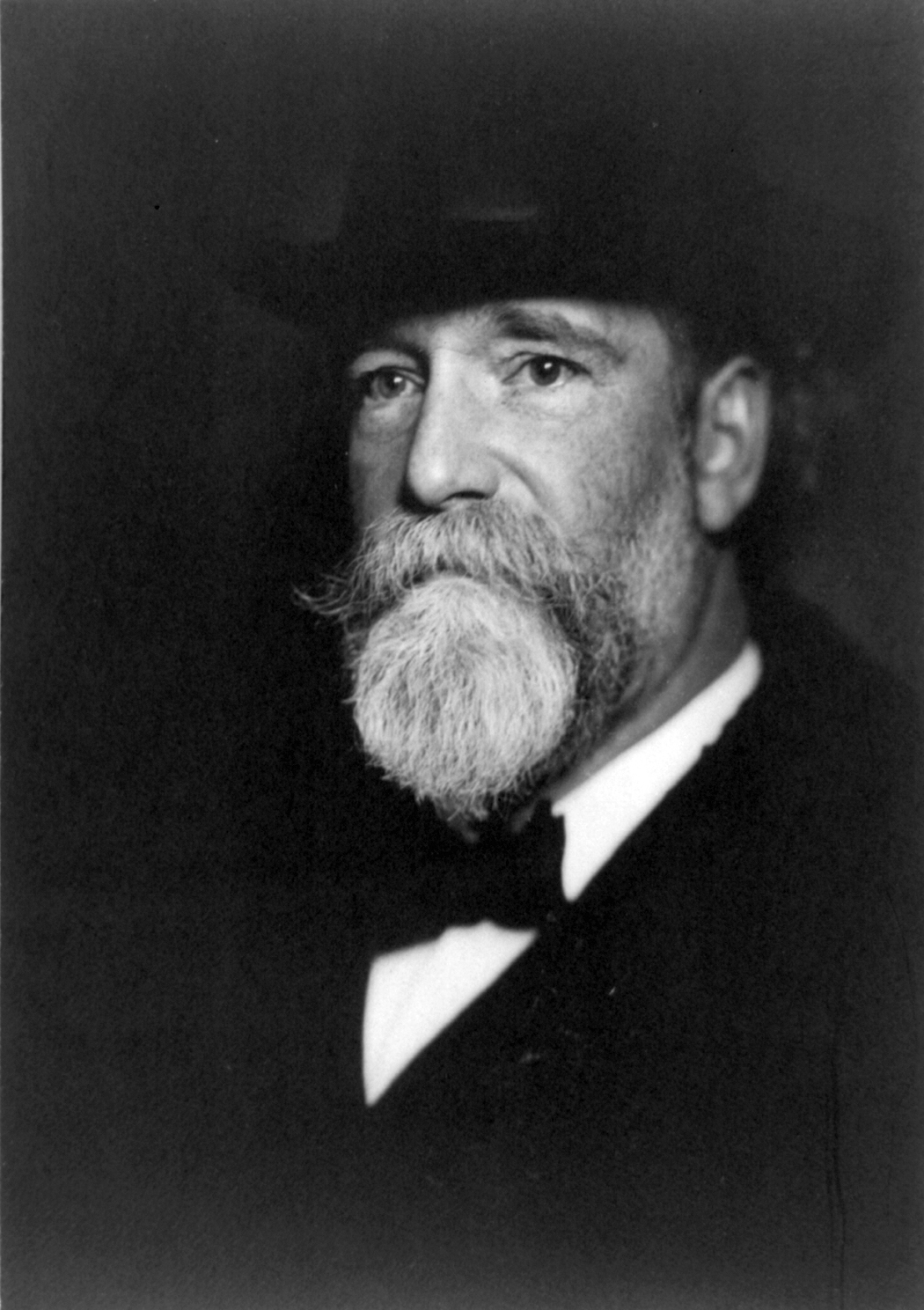
Clarence Eddy (1905), photo by Pirie MacDonald

Hiram Clarence Eddy (June 23, 1851 – January 10, 1937) was an American organist and composer

== Biography ==
He was born in Greenfield, Massachusetts. He studied under Dudley Buck in Hartford, Connecticut, counterpoint under Carl August Haupt, and piano under Carl Albert Loeschhorn in Berlin. In 1874-76 he was organist of the First Congregational Church, Chicago; afterward organist and choirmaster of the First Presbyterian Church for 17 years and from 1875 to 1908 was director of the Hershey School of Musical Art. In 1877-79 he gave a series of 100 organ recitals, with entirely different programs, a memorable achievement in American musical annals. He played at several expositions in America and abroad, and gave recitals in the principal American and European cities. He composed several works for the organ, including one method book for instruction.

== Studies in Europe ==
In the summer of 1871, Eddy went to Berlin to study for a period of more than two years. He studied organ and theory with Carl August Haupt, and piano with Carl Albert Löschorn. En route to Berlin, Eddy visited England and France, making important connections with distinguished organists such as Alexandre Guilmant, Charles-Marie Widor, Camille Saint-Saëns, César Franck, W.T. Best, and others.

Reportedly practicing from six to ten hours a day, he had lessons weekly, and also participated in chamber music activities, in addition to concertizing. One 1873 review spoke highly of Eddy's performance, stating that “all the excellent qualities of the master showed themselves in the playing of the pupil. Massive technique, clearness and certainty, energy in taking the tones and a wonderfully lovely legato.”

Further concerts allowed Eddy to secure the funds necessary to repay the loan which was taken out to enable his European trip. Finally, in the spring of 1874, he returned to the United States after an extensive trip through Holland, Belgium, France, and London.

== Return to the United States ==
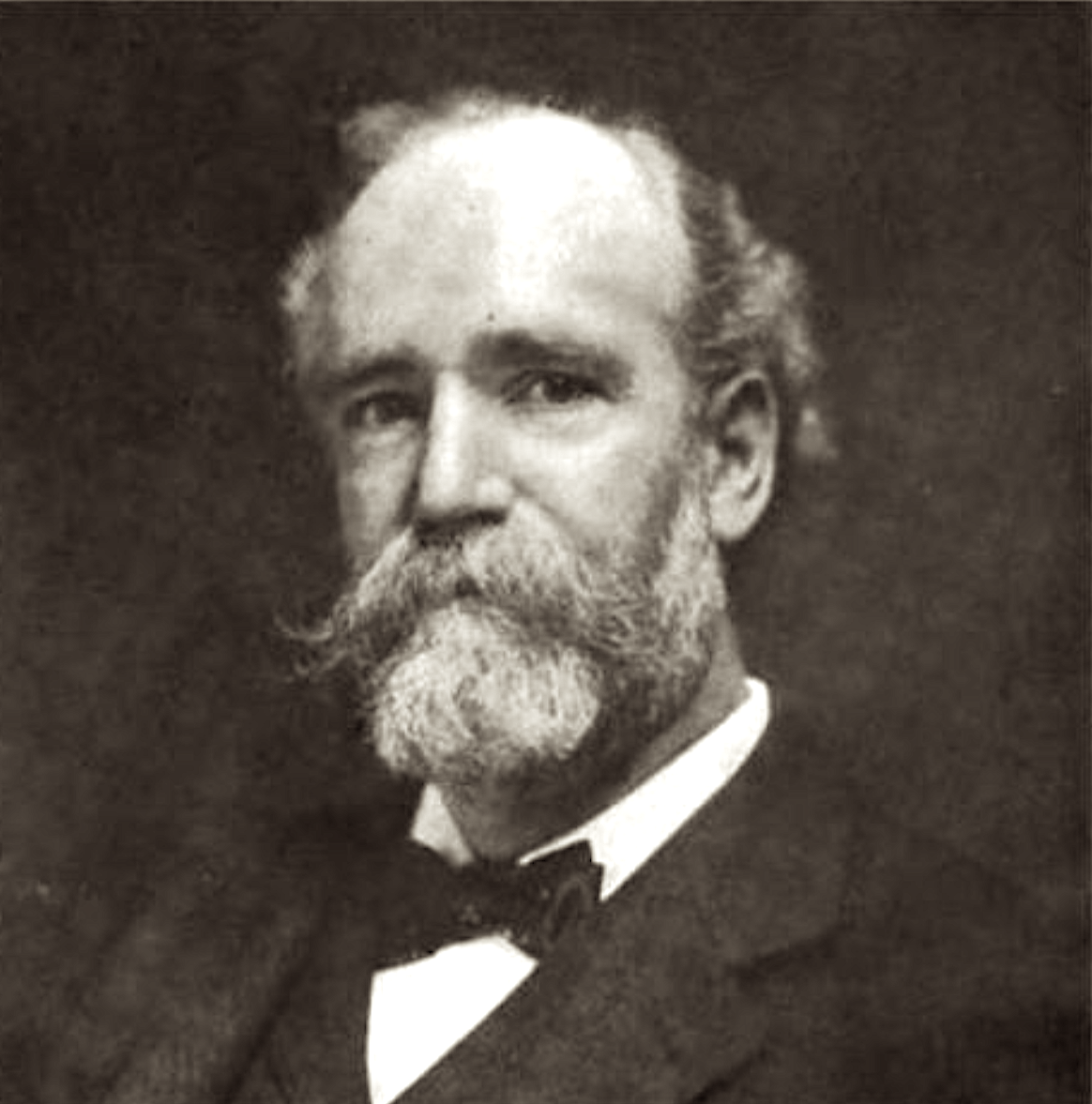
Clarence Eddy

Returning to the United States with a letter of recommendation from Haupt, Eddy presided as organist at the First Congregational Church in Chicago. He received praise for his playing of the music he had learned in Europe. In 1879, he took the position of organist at First Presbyterian Church, staying there for 17 years. In 1876, Eddy spent one week in Philadelphia playing recitals three times a day at the Centennial Exposition.

During his time in Chicago, he became involved with the Hershey School of Music as general director. It was founded in 1875 by Sara Hershey, and in 1876 the Hershey Music Hall was completed, giving the school the facilities it needed. A three-manual Johnson organ (built to Eddy's specifications) was installed for teaching and concert purposes. Inaugural concerts were performed on January 23 and 25 of 1877.

Continuing to tour and perform extensively, Eddy remained part of the Chicago music scene, including designing and dedicating the Roosevelt organ in the Auditorium Theatre. Eddy left Chicago in 1895, spending the rest of his life touring, teaching, and concertizing, dedicating over 1000 organs in his career. He later wrote organ method books, and teaching remained part of his career after leaving the Hershey school.

== The 100 Recitals ==
Between 1877 and 1879, Eddy gave over 100 recitals, all with different programs on Sunday afternoons at the Hershey Music Hall. Each recital featured a piece by Bach and a variety of contemporary organ works, including transcriptions. Each recital also had two pieces of non-organ music, typically a vocalist, or chamber music. In addition to performing works by composer Ada Weigel Powers, he collaborated with her in 1915 to compose “Shepherd’s Song.”

== Writings ==
- The Church and Concert Organist (3 vols., 1885)
- The Organ in Church (1887)
- Concert Pieces for the Organ (1889)
- Carl August Haupt, Counterpoint, Fugue, and Double Counterpoint, translator (1876)

== Later life ==
Eddy moved around between various cites, including New York and Paris. Continuing to concertize up until his death, he also recorded player organ rolls for the Aeolian Company. He died on January 10, 1937, from heart and kidney complications. He is interred in his hometown of Greenfield, Massachusetts.

== Family ==
In 1879, was married to singer Sara Hershey who established the Hershey School of Musical Art in Chicago. Eddy and Hershey divorced in 1905.
