= Oz Vehadar =

- Status: Active
- Founded: c. 1988
- Founder: Rabbi Yosef Samet
- Publication types: Books
- Nonfiction topics: Sifrei Kodesh
- Owner: Rabbi Yehoshua Leifer
- Official website: ozvehadar.us

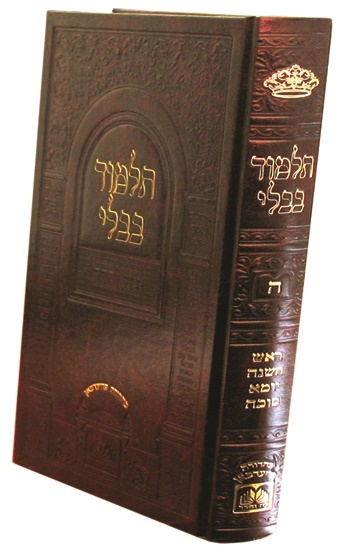
A volume of the Talmud published by Oz Vehadar

Oz Vehadar (Hebrew: עוז והדר) is a Torah institute that deals with the publication of Torah books. It was founded by Rabbi Yosef Samet and currently headed by Rabbi Yehoshua Leifer from New Square, NY.

== Projects ==
Oz Vehadar publishes a wide range of Torah books relating to Tanach, Mishnah, Talmud, and works of Rishonim and Acharonim.

=== Babylonian Talmud ===
From 1988 to 2007, Oz Vehadar worked on publishing a new edition of the Babylonian Talmud with corrections of previous texts and a retypesetting of the commentaries. The cost of the project was over $20 million. The project was supported by Jewish businessman and philanthropist Hershey Friedman and thus named "Mahaduras Friedman" after him.

Oz Vehadar also publishes an edition of the Talmud with vowelization and punctuation.

They also published the Mesivta edition of the Talmud, which includes a Hebrew-language translation and commentary, as well as many individual commentaries on the Talmud, including several volumes of Kovetz Mefarshim and the Shita Mekubetzes.

=== Other publications ===
Other Oz Vehadar publications include Talmud Yerushalmi, Tanakh, Hasidic works, Halakhic works, Passover Haggadas, and other books.

== Gallery ==
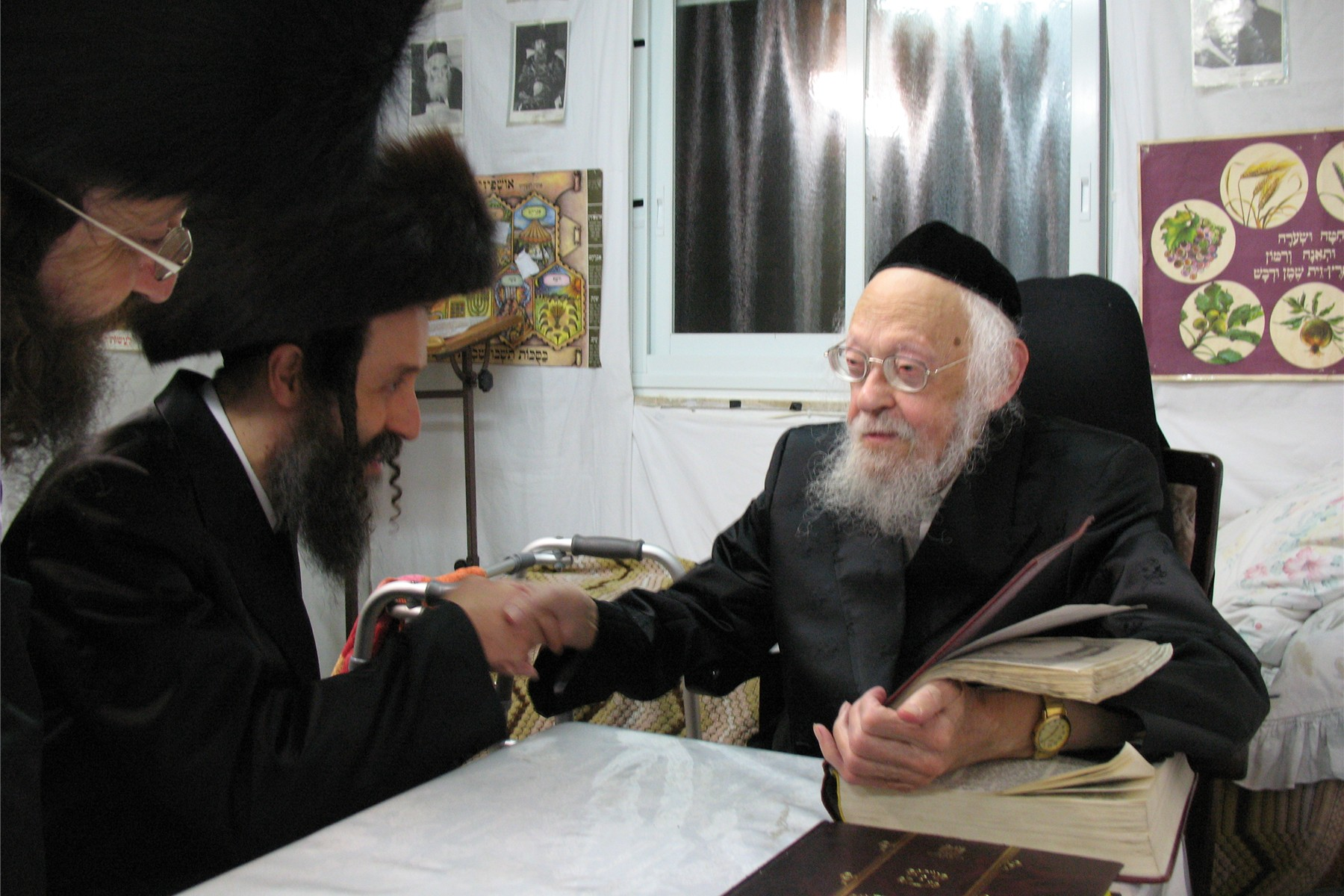
Rabbi Yehoshua Leifer, owner of Oz Vehadar, meeting with Rabbi Yosef Shalom Eliashiv

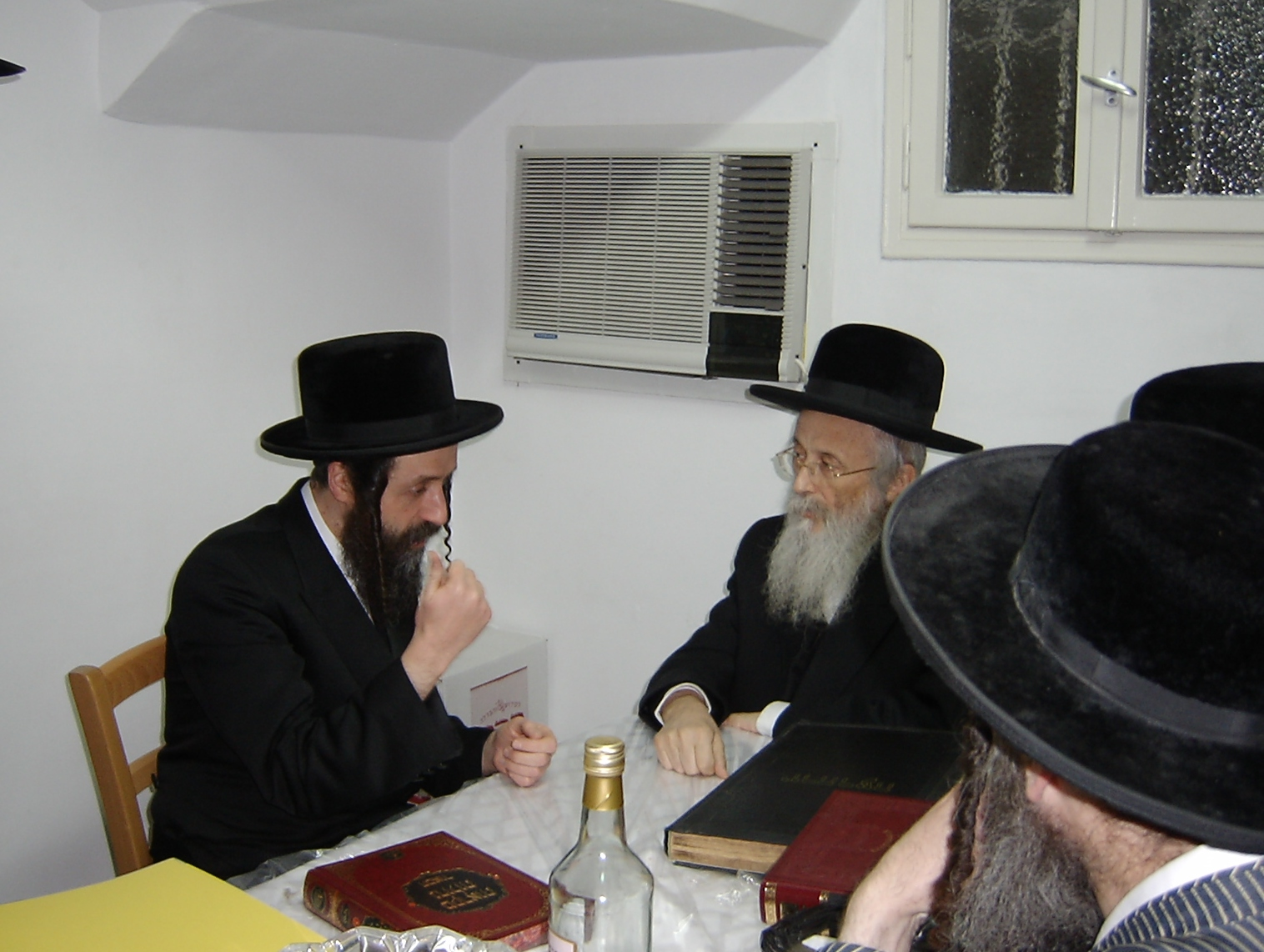
Rabbi Leifer with Rabbi Yitzchok Tuvia Weiss

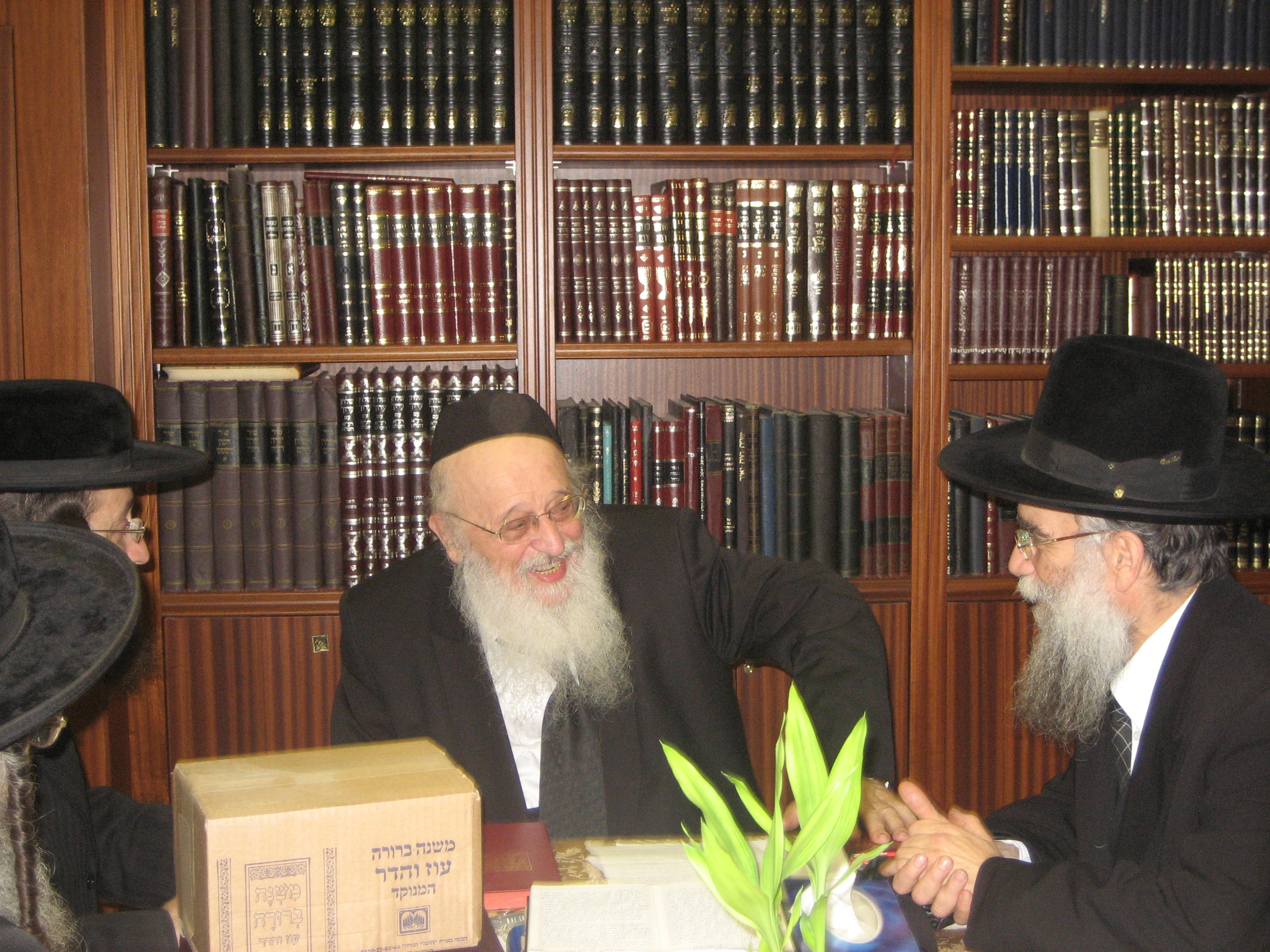
Rabbi Meir Tzvi Bergman with a packaged set of Oz Vehadar Mishna Berurahs

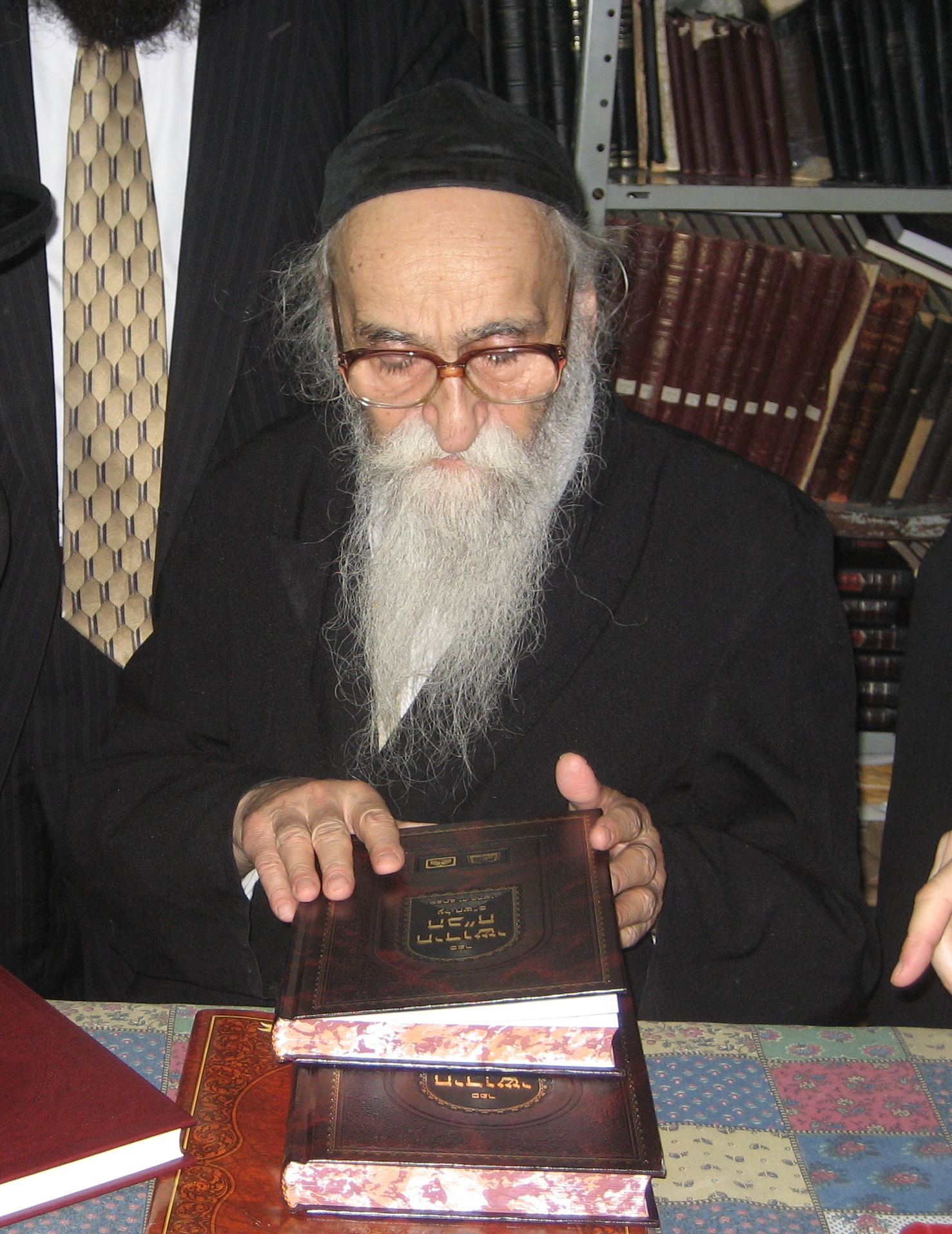
Rabbi Dovid Soloveitchik with Oz Vehadar's Chiddushei HaBach

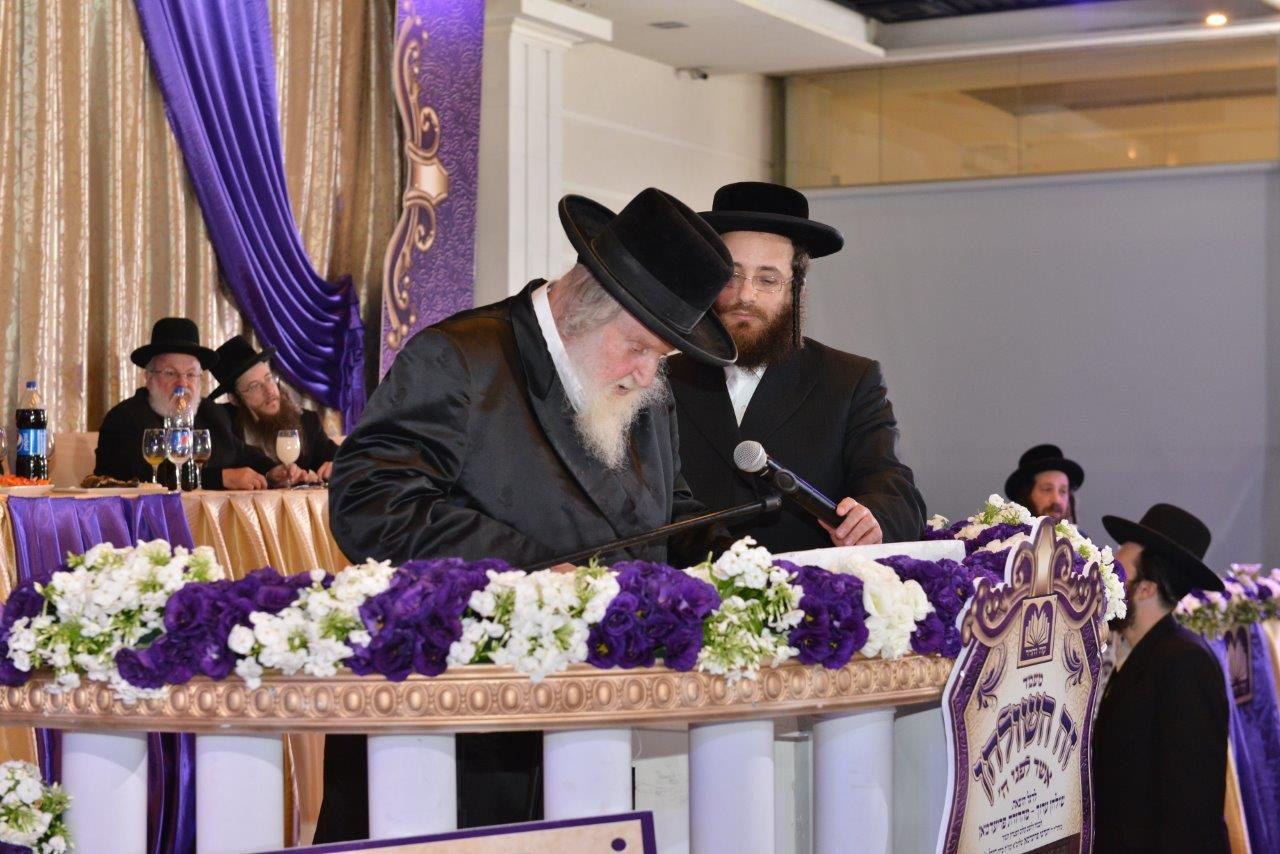
Rabbi Moshe Sternbuch at an Oz Vehadar event

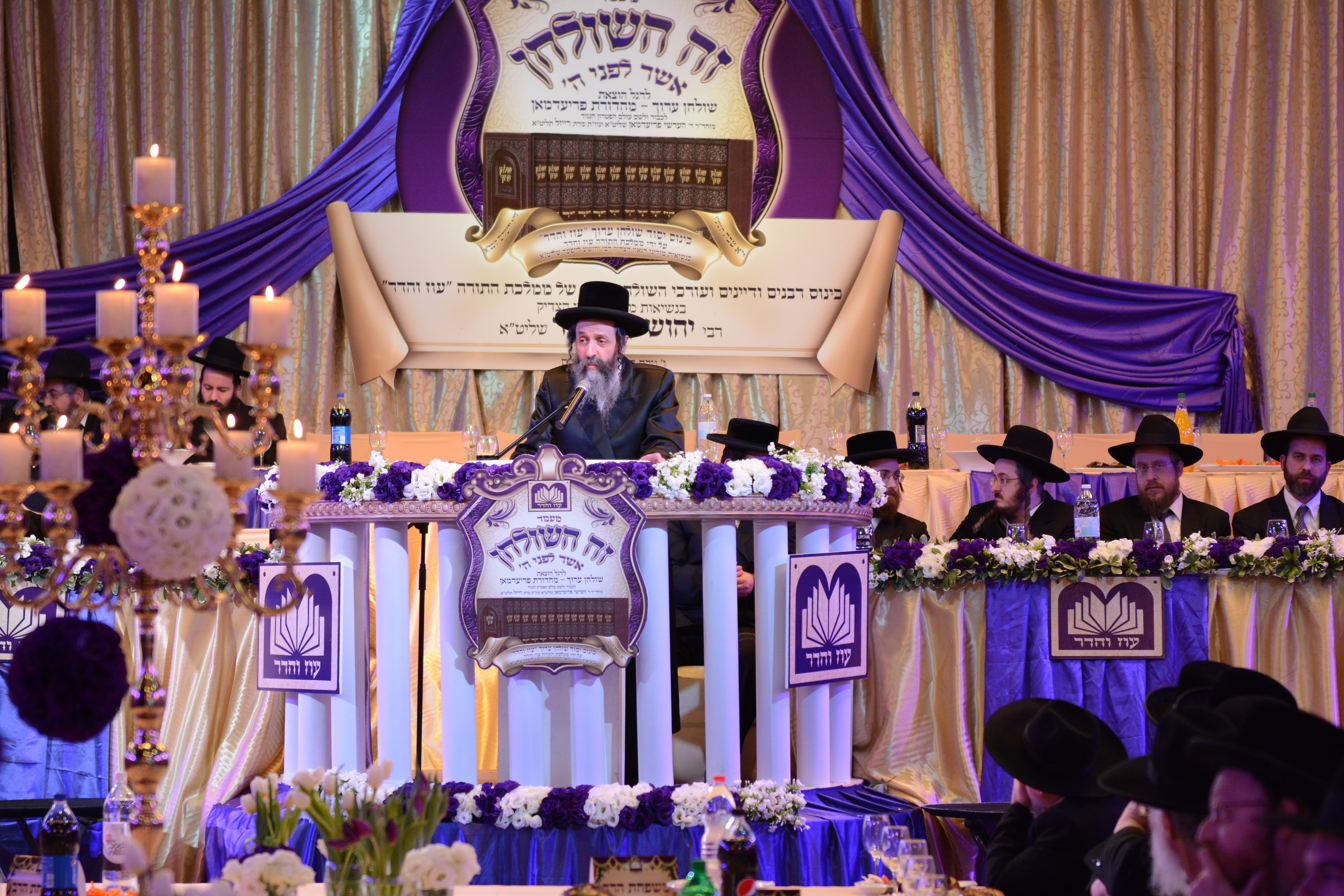
Rabbi Leifer at the event
