= Almira Hershey =

American businesswoman and philanthropist (1843–1930)

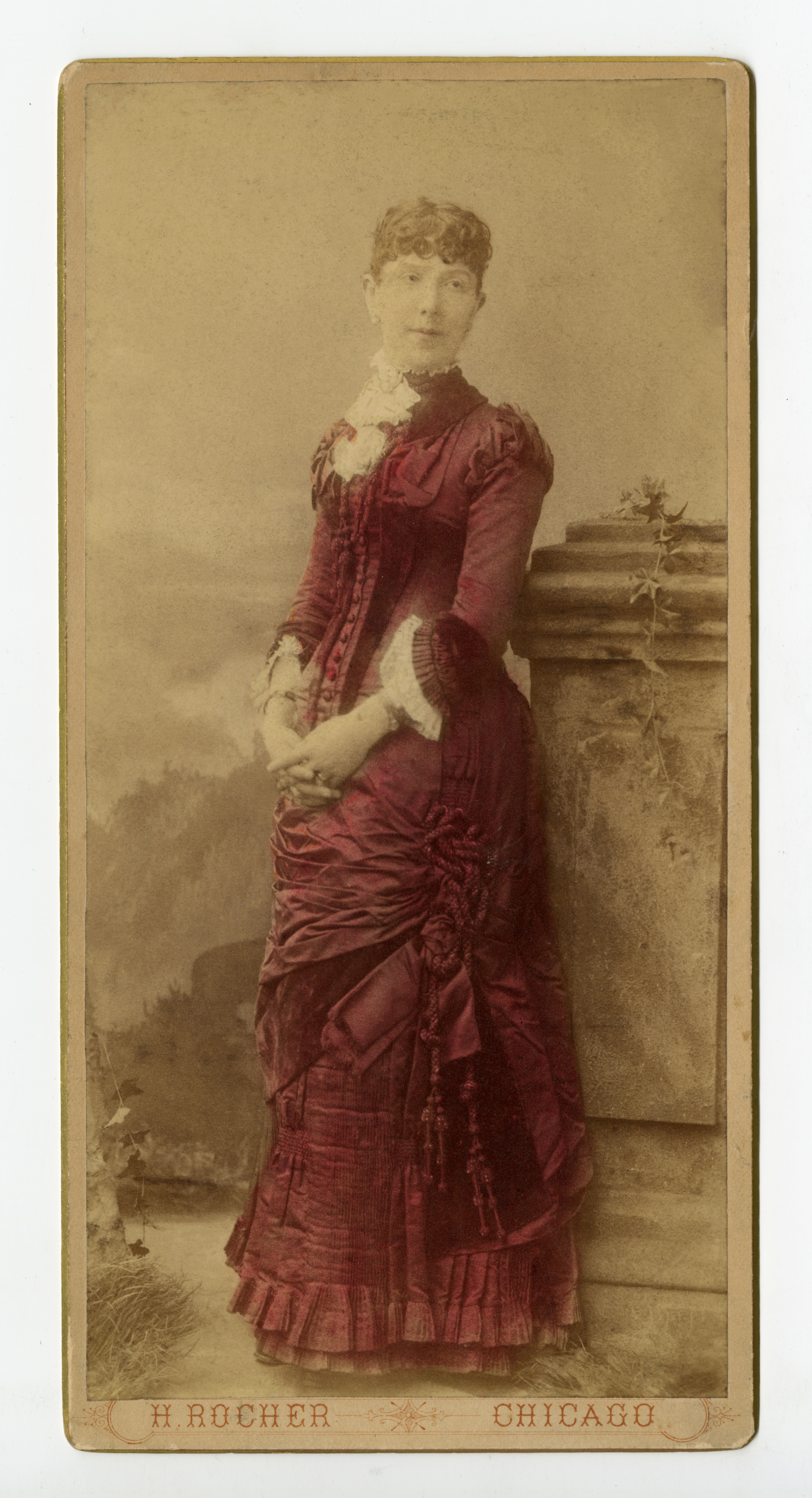
Hershey, c. 1876

Almira Hershey (November 14, 1843 – March 6, 1930) was an American property developer, hotelier and philanthropist. She owned the Hotel Hollywood, the Hershey Arms Hotel and the Naples Hotel in Los Angeles County, California.

== Early life and education ==
Almira "Mira" Hershey was born the fourth and youngest daughter of lumber and farming magnate Benjamin Hershey, in Lancaster County, Pennsylvania. Her family moved to Muscatine, Iowa, in 1853. Her sisters were Mary Amanda, Elizabeth, and Sara. Elizabeth died at the age of 14 and Mary Amanda died at the age of 37. She was distantly related to Milton S. Hershey, founder of The Hershey Company.

Hershey attended Pennsylvania Female College in Collegeville, Pennsylvania.

== Career ==
After completing her studies abroad, Hershey worked for her father in the family lumber business from the 1870s until her father's death in 1893. Hershey was left a substantial legacy by her father when he died.

Hershey moved to Los Angeles in 1894. She purchased real estate on Bunker Hill and commissioned the building of a European-style mansion at 4th Street and Grand Avenue, which she occupied for ten years.

Sometime around 1906 she took a horse and buggy ride to Hollywood and visited the Hotel Hollywood. She was so impressed with the new hotel she decided to buy it. It turned out to be a great asset because the fledgling movie industry was developing quickly and the Hotel Hollywood became the temporary residence of almost all the top actors and movie moguls. It was so successful that Hershey had the hotel extended so that it took up the complete block on the north side of Hollywood Boulevard between Highland and Orchid Avenues. She added gardens to the frontage and inner courtyard. The hotel became a tourist attraction on the Balloon Route trolley car service. Sometime in the 1920s, the name of the hotel changed to the Hollywood Hotel.

Hershey went on to build two more hotels. The Hershey Arms Hotel on Wilshire Boulevard was the first hotel built on the street. She also built a hotel in the Naples area of Long Beach, California, called the Naples Hotel. She sold this hotel just before the great financial crash of 1929 before any guests had stayed there.

== Later years and death ==
Hershey never married. She spent her later years at the Hotel Hollywood with friends.

Hershey died on March 6, 1930, having suffered a stroke a few days earlier. A funeral service was held at Hollywood Cemetery Chapel under the auspices of the Humanist Society, of which Hershey was a member. She was cremated and her ashes were taken to Muscatine, Iowa, for burial in the family plot.

== Philanthropy ==
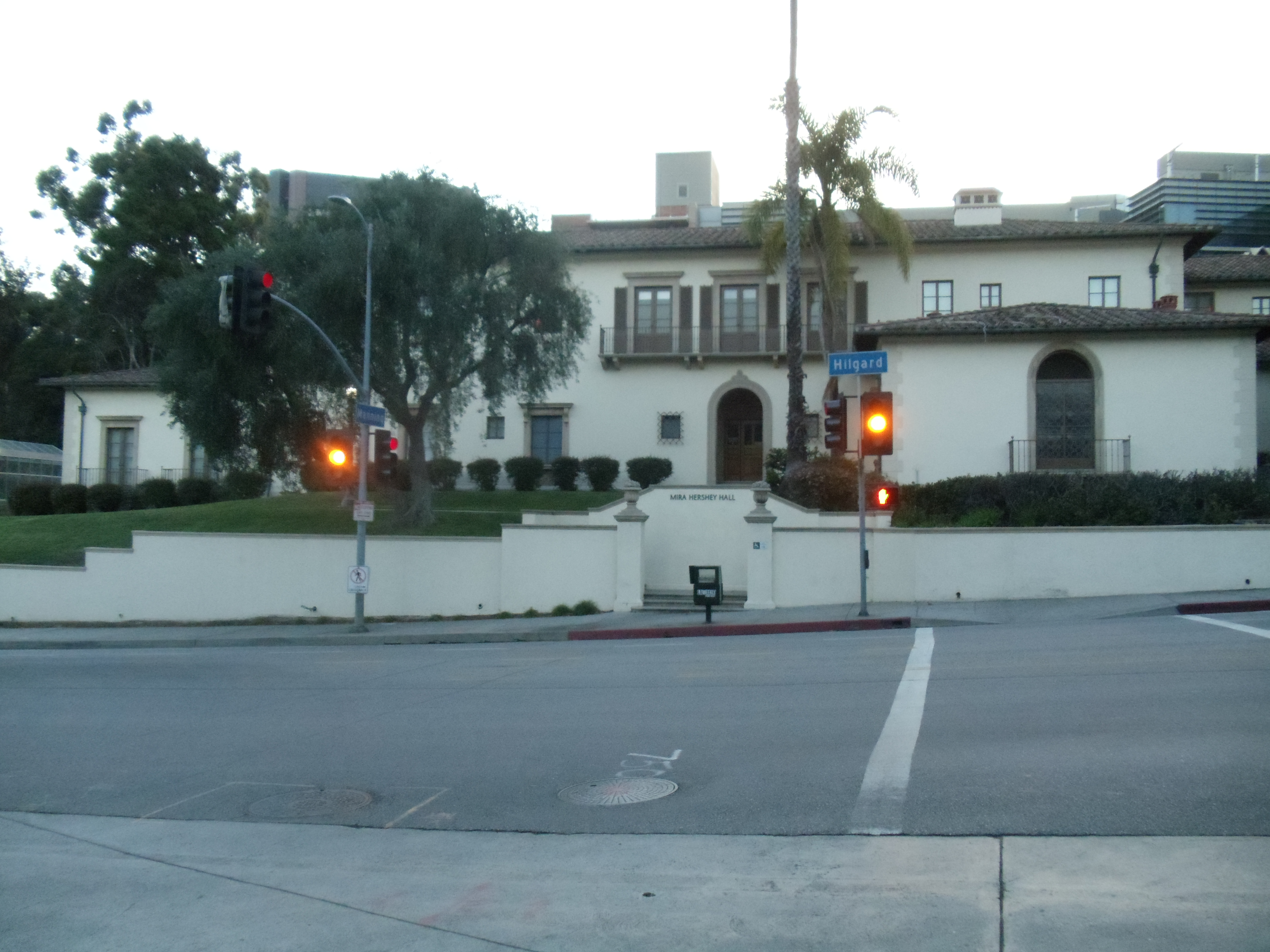
Mira Hershey Hall at UCLA

Hershey made several gifts to her hometown of Muscatine, Iowa, including:

- Lutheran Home for the Aged and Orphaned Children (gift made in 1895)
- The Benjamin Hershey Memorial Hospital (opened June 26, 1902)

Mira Hershey made numerous gifts during her lifetime to institutions in Los Angeles most significantly Good Hope Hospital Association, later the Good Hope Medical Foundation, incorporated in 1925 with a founding gift of around $1,000,000

In Mira Hershey's estate, whose total value was around $6,000,000, she made the following bequests:

- $300,000 for the construction of a women's dormitory at UCLA
- $100,000 for the establishment of a loan fund for needy students at UCLA
- $50,000 for the McKinley home for Boys
- $25,000 for the Southwest Museum
- $25,000 for the Los Angeles County Museum
- $25,000 for the Maternity Cottage
- $25,000 for the Los Angeles Orphan Asylum
- $10,000 for the Orthopedic Foundation
- $10,000 for the Children's Hospital
- $10,000 for Resthaven
- $5000 to the Young Women's Christian Association
- $5000 to the Academy of Science

== Bequest to UCLA ==
A year before her death in 1930, Hershey added to her will a bequest of $300,000 to University of California, Los Angeles (UCLA) to support the construction of Hershey Hall, a residence for women students, the university's first on-campus dormitory. The Westwood campus had opened the year before, in 1929, and consisted of only four buildings. Why Mira Hershey chose to make such a large gift to the young campus is a matter of speculation. However, Hershey’s lawyer knew UC Regent Edward Dickson, and visited his office in the late 1920s during early construction on the Westwood campus. It is not known whether Regent Dickson formally proposed the idea of Hershey’s supporting the new campus, but given Hershey’s unusual standing as a woman with a college education, combined with her activities as a property developer and philanthropist, the fit was a natural one. It is also the case that Mira Hershey lived in proximity to UCLA's two educational antecedents: (1) the Los Angeles Branch of the California State Normal School founded in 1881 and lasting until 1919; and (2) the Southern Branch of the University of California, which operated from 1919 until 1927, when the school was renamed The University of California at Los Angeles. Hershey's first home on Bunker Hill was a block from the Normal School. Her second home at the Hotel Hollywood was about 5 miles from the Southern Branch.

In the early 1920s, Hershey served on the Advisory Board of the Philharmonic Orchestra of Los Angeles, founded by William Andrews Clark, Jr., who deeded his purpose-built library, the William Andrews Clark Memorial Library, to the Southern Branch of the University of California in 1926.

== Mira Hershey Hall UCLA ==
Mira Hershey Hall opened in October of 1931 for 137 residents. In 1959, the "West Wing Addition" opened for male students. Together, the two wings housed 327 residents. In 1969, Mira Hershey hall became coed housing for graduate students, though only women were ever allowed to live in the original 1931 building. The Northridge earthquake of 1994 caused considerable damage to the West Wing Addition and it was deemed unsafe for residential use. In 1998, Hershey Hall was converted from residential to academic uses, providing offices and classrooms. In 2006, the West Wing was demolished and, in its place, two towers of the Terasaki Life Sciences Building were built, opening in 2012. Following seismic reinforcement, repairs, and upgrades, Mira Hershey Hall reopened for administrative uses in the Life Sciences in 2012.

== Sources ==
- https://web.archive.org/web/20090418175321/http://www.myancestralfile.com/hershey/pafg01.htm
- http://www.onbunkerhill.org/
- Early Hollywood by Marc Wanamaker and Robert W. Nudelman.
- The Story of Hollywood by Gregory Paul Williams.
