= Jerusalem Talmud =

Talmud compiled in Southern Levant

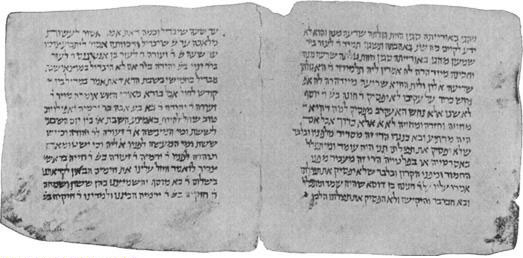
A page of a medieval Jerusalem Talmud manuscript, from the Cairo Geniza.

The Jerusalem Talmud (Hebrew: תַּלְמוּד יְרוּשַׁלְמִי, romanized: Talmud Yerushalmi, often Yerushalmi for short), also known as the Talmud of the Land of Israel or Palestinian Talmud, is a collection of rabbinic commentary on the Mishnah, a codification of Jewish oral traditions ("Oral Torah") believed to have been revealed by Moses alongside the Written Torah. Since this Talmud originated in Galilee, in the Byzantine province Palaestina Secunda, rather than in Jerusalem (where Jews were prohibited from living since the time of Hadrian), many prefer calling it the Palestinian Talmud.

The Jerusalem Talmud predates its counterpart, the Babylonian Talmud (known in Hebrew as the Talmud Bavli), by about a century. It was written primarily in Galilean Aramaic. It was compiled between the late fourth century to the first half of the fifth century. Both versions of the Talmud have two parts, the Mishnah (of which there is only one version), which was finalized by Judah the Prince around the year 200 CE, and the respective commentary tradition on the Mishnah from each region, known as a Gemara. The Gemara is what differentiates the Jerusalem Talmud from its Babylonian counterpart. The Jerusalem Gemara contains the written discussions of generations of rabbis of the Talmudic academies in Syria Palaestina at Tiberias and Caesarea.

== Name ==
This Talmud is commonly known as the Jerusalem Talmud or the Palestinian Talmud. Academics prefer to speak of the "Palestinian Talmud" because of the texts origins mainly from the Galilee region of Palestine (or the Land of Israel) in the Byzantine province, Palaestina Secunda, rather than from Jerusalem.

Both names were being used in the geonim period (6th–11th century CE), alongside other names such as "Talmud of the Land of Israel", "Talmud of the West", and "Talmud of the Western Lands".

== Origins and historical context ==
The Jerusalem Talmud probably originated in Tiberias in the School of Johanan bar Nappaha as a compilation of teachings of the schools of Tiberias, Caesarea, and Sepphoris. It is written largely in Galilean Aramaic, a Western Aramaic dialect that differs from its Babylonian counterpart.

This Talmud is a commentary on the Mishnah. Before being compiled, this commentary tradition on the Mishnah grew for nearly 200 years among the Talmudic academies in Syria Palaestina (principally those of Tiberias and Caesarea).

== Manuscripts ==
The Leiden Jerusalem Talmud (Or. 4720) is today the only surviving complete manuscript of the Jerusalem Talmud. It was copied in 1289 by the Jewish scholar Jehiel ben Jekuthiel Anav and shows elements of a later recension. Today, it is held at Leiden University Libraries. The manuscript has biblical glosses which are absent from the Yemeni fragments of the same tractates (perhaps owing to the isolation of the Yemenite community).

The Leiden manuscript is important in that it preserves some earlier variants to textual readings, such as in Tractate Pesachim 10:3 (70a), which brings down the old Hebrew word for charoset (the sweet relish eaten at Passover), viz. dūkeh (Hebrew: דוכה), instead of rūbeh/rabah (Hebrew: רובה), saying with a play on words: "The members of Isse's household would say in the name of Isse: Why is it called dūkeh? It is because she pounds [the spiced ingredients] with him." The Hebrew word for "pound" is dakh (דך), which rules out the spelling of rabah (רבה), as found in the printed editions. Yemenite Jews still call it dūkeh.

Leiden University Libraries has digitised both volumes of the manuscript and made it available in its Digital Collections.

Among the Hebrew manuscripts held in the Vatican Library is a late 13th-century – early 14th-century copy of Tractate Sotah and the complete Zeraim for the Jerusalem Talmud (Vat. ebr. 133): Berakhot, Peah, Demai, Kilayim, Sheviit, Terumot, Maaserot, Maaser Sheni, Ḥallah and Orlah (without the Mishnah for the Tractates, excepting only the Mishnah to the 2nd chapter of Berakhot). Several sources have printed the variant readings from this manuscript (L. Ginzberg, Fragments of the Yerushalmi (New York 1909), pp. 347–372 and in the end of Saul Lieberman's essay ʿAl ha-Yerushalmi (Hebrew), Jerusalem 1929). Both editors noted that this manuscript is full of gross errors but also retains some valuable readings.

== Dating ==
=== Premodern estimates ===
Traditionally, the redaction of this Talmud was thought to have been brought to an abrupt end around 425, when Theodosius II suppressed the Nasi of the Sanhedrin and put an end to the practice of semikhah (formal scholarly ordination). The redaction of the Jerusalem Talmud was done to codify the laws of the Sanhedrin as the redaction of the Mishnah had similarly done during the time of Judah ha-Nasi. It was thought that the compilers of the Jerusalem Talmud worked to collect the rulings of the Sanhedrin and lacked the time to produce a work of the quality they had intended and that this is the reason why the Gemara do not comment upon the whole Mishnah, or that certain sections were lost.

=== Modern estimates ===
Current perspectives on the dating of the closure of the text of the Palestinian Talmud rely on an understanding of activity of rabbinic scholarship and literary production, identifying datable historical datapoints mentioned by the text, and its reliance on and citation by other datable (or roughly datable) texts. Broadly, the Palestinian Talmud is dated at some time from the second half of the fourth century to the first half of the fifth century.

Christine Hayes has argued that a lack of evidence for Amoraim activity in Syria Palaestina after the 370s implies that the text was closed by around 370. However, reference to historical events from around or even slightly after 370 may push the earliest possible date to the late 4th century. For example, the Roman general Ursicinus, who had a public role between 351 and 359, is mentioned several times in a legendary context, suggesting that these references are somewhat later than his public career. Furthermore, there is also a reference to the Persian campaign of the Roman emperor Julian from 363. While less clear, there is also confidence that the Roman official "Proclus" named by the Palestinian Talmud corresponds to a Roman official also named Proclus, who became the governor of Palestine around 380 and eventually climbed to the position of praefectus urbi Constantinopolis (Prefect of Constantinople) which he held between 388 and 392. The final generation of rabbis whose opinions are found in the text belong to the second half of the fourth century. The time of the editing and compilation of these opinions would likely have occurred in the generation of their disciples, again leading to a date of the text during the late fourth or the early fifth century.

The dating of the Palestinian Talmud is definitively prior to that of the Babylonian Talmud, which relies heavily on it. The Babylonian Talmud was composed at some time between the mid-sixth century to the early-seventh century, but prior to the onset of the Arab conquests. This provides an upper absolute boundary as to when the Palestinian Talmud could have been compiled. To further push down the upper boundary, some lines (Demai 2:1; Shevi'it 6:1) of the Palestinian Talmud are also extant in the Tel Rehov inscription which dates to the 6th or 7th century.

== Contents and pagination ==
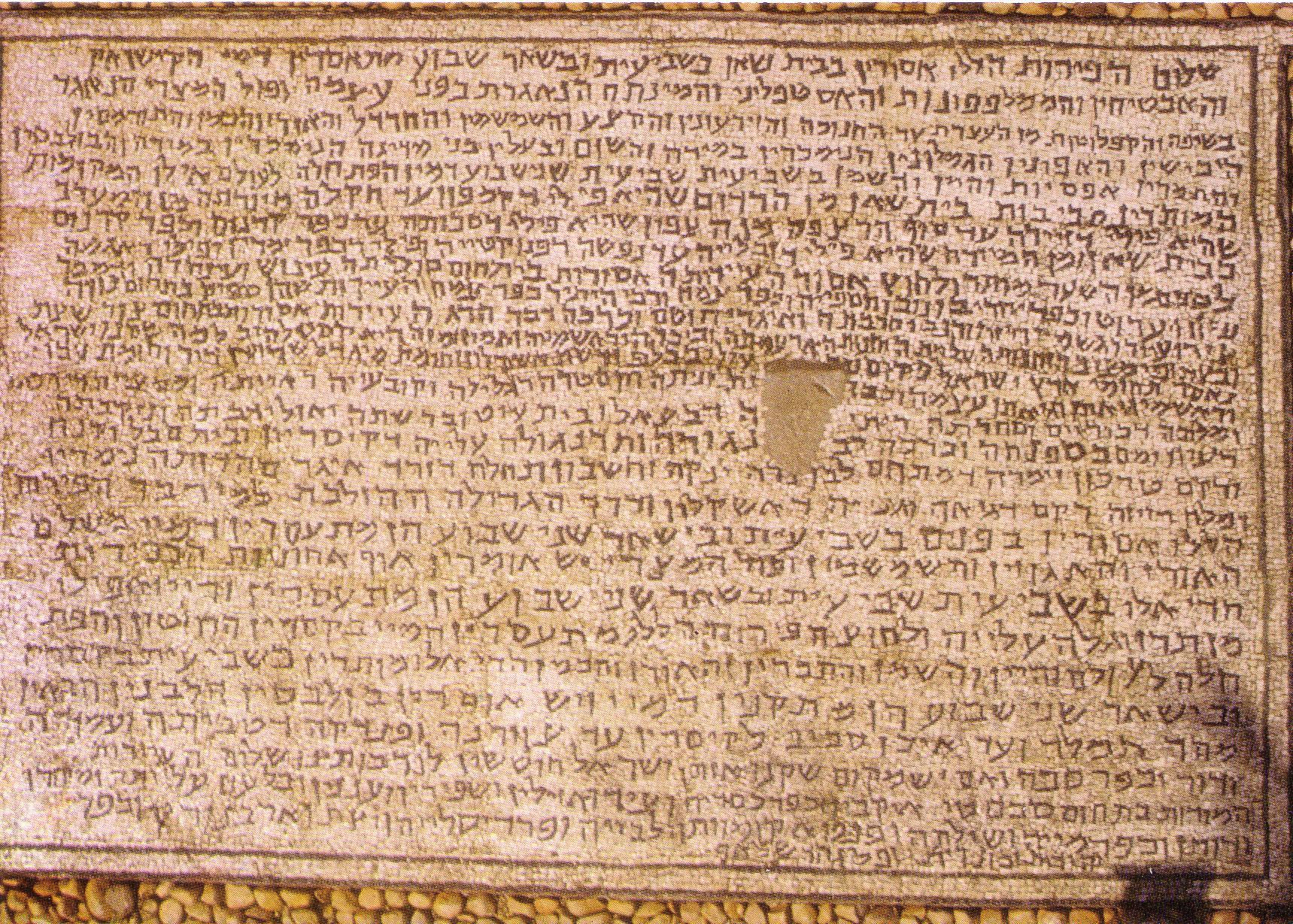
Mosaic of Rehob (3rd–6th century CE), quoting a baraita which also appears in the Jerusalem Talmud (Shviit 6:1)

In the initial Venice edition, the Jerusalem Talmud was published in four volumes, corresponding to separate sedarim of the Mishnah. Page numbers are by volume as follows:

1. Zeraim: Berakhot (2a–14d); Pe'ah (15a–21b); Demai (21c–26c); Kilayim (26d–32d); Sheviit (33a–39d); Terumot (40a–48b); Maasrot (48c–52a); Maaser Sheni (52b–58d); Hallah (57a–60b); Orlah (60c–63b); Bikkurim (63c–65d).
2. Moed: Shabbat (2a–18a); Eruvin (18a–26d); Pesachim (27a–37d); Yoma (38a–45c); Shekalim (45c–51b); Sukkah (51c–55d); Rosh ha-Shanah (56a–59d); Beẓah (59d–63b), Ta'anit (63c–69c); Megillah (69d–75d); Ḥagigah (75d–79d); Mo'ed Ḳaṭan (80a–83d).
3. Nashim: Yebamot (2a–15a); Sotah (15a–24c); Ketuvot (24c–36b); Nedarim (36c–42d); Gittin (43a–50d); Nazir (51a–58a); Kiddushin (58a–66d).
4. Nezikin (and Tohorot): Bava Kamma (2a–7c); Bava Metziah (7c–12c); Bava Batra (12d–17d); Sanhedrin (17d–30c); Makkot (30d–32b); Shevuot (32c–38d); Avodah Zarah (39a–45b); Horayot (45c–48c); Niddah (48d–51b).

Each page was printed as a folio, thus it contains four sub-pages (i.e., 7a, 7b, 7c, 7d), in contrast to the Babylonian Talmud which only has two sub-pages (7a, 7b).

In addition, each chapter of the Jerusalem Talmud (paralleling a chapter of Mishnah) is divided into "halachot"; each "halacha" is the commentary on a single short passage of Mishnah. Passages in the Jerusalem Talmud are generally references by a combination of chapter and halacha (i.e., Yerushalmi Sotah 1:1), by a page in the Venice edition (i.e., Yerushalmi Sotah 15a), or both (Yerushalmi Sotah 1:1 15a).

=== Missing sections ===
In addition to the sedarim of Tohorot (except part of Niddah) and Kodashim, several tractates and parts of tractates are missing from the Jerusalem Talmud. The last four chapters of Shabbat, and the last chapter of Makkot, are missing. Niddah ends abruptly after the first lines of chapter 4.

The Mishnaic tractates Avot and Eduyot have no commentary in either the Babylonian Talmud or the Jerusalem/Palestinian Talmud. Tractate Shekalim has no Babylonian commentary. For this reason, the standard printed editions of the Babylonian Talmud include the Jerusalem Talmud's commentary on Shekalim instead.

According to the Jewish Encyclopedia,

Yerushalmi has not been preserved in its entirety; large portions of it were entirely lost at an early date, while other parts exist only in fragments. The editio princeps (ed. Bomberg, Venice, 1523 et seq.), based on the Leiden manuscript and on which all later editions are based, terminates with the following remark: "Thus far we have found what is contained in this Talmud; and we have endeavored in vain to obtain the missing portions." Of the four manuscripts used for this first edition (comp. the note at the conclusion of Shab. xx. 17d and the passage just cited), only one is now in existence; it is preserved in the library of the University of Leyden (see below). Of the six orders of the Mishnah, the fifth, Ḳodashim, is missing entirely from the Palestinian Talmud, while the sixth, Ṭohorot, contains only the first three chapters of the treatise Niddah (iv. 48d–51b).

=== Missing passages ===
Occasionally, the rishonim quote passages from the "Yerushalmi" which are not found in extant versions of the Jerusalem Talmud. Proposed explanations for this include the following:

- The current Jerusalem Talmud has been truncated from its original version by the scribes who copied it.
- For these rishonim, "Yerushalmi" was a collective term which included any work of midrash from the Land of Israel, and not necessarily a reference to the Jerusalem Talmud proper.
- A separate text, summarizing the Jerusalem Talmud, was composed at some stage and the rishonim quote this work rather than the Jerusalem Talmud proper.

== Comparison to Babylonian Talmud ==
There are significant differences between the two Talmud compilations.

The two Talmuds were written in different languages: The language of the Jerusalem Talmud is Galilean Aramaic, whereas the language of the Babylonian Talmud is Jewish Babylonian Aramaic. While both are a commentary on the Mishnah, there are many different interpretations between them.

Due to its earlier date, the Jerusalem Talmud may better reflect the original opinions of the scholars it quotes. Rabbinic sages traveled between and exchanged information from Palestine and Babylonia, and so the opinions of both Palestinian and Babylonian sages are found in both Talmuds. Carol Bakhos says that the "Palestinian Amoraim populate the pages of the Bavli [Babylonian Talmud] alongside the Babylonian sages." However, the Jerusalem Talmud does not reflect Babylonian tradition to the same extant that the Babylonian Talmud reflects traditions from Palestine. The Jerusalem Talmud reflects opinions from the first five generations of Jewish scholars in its time period (the amoraim) whereas only the first three corresponding Babylonian generations are included in it. While the Babylonian Talmud includes the opinions of later generations of Babylonian sages, this is mainly because it was completed later.

Neither the Jerusalem nor the Babylonian Talmud covers the entire Mishnah, and coverage of the Mishnah differs between them. In particular:

- The Jerusalem Talmud covers all the tractates of Zeraim (the first of the six orders of the Mishnah), while the Babylonian Talmud only covers its tractate Berachot. The reason might be that most laws from the Zeraim are agricultural laws limited to the land of Israel, with limited practical relevance or appeal in Babylonia.
- The Jerusalem Talmud does not cover the fifth Mishnaic order, Kodashim, which deals with sacrificial rites and laws pertaining to the Temple, while the Babylonian Talmud does cover it. It is not clear why this is, as the laws were not directly applicable in either country following the destruction of the Temple in 70 CE.

The Jerusalem Talmud is often fragmentary and difficult to read, moreso than the Babylonian Talmud which is more careful and precise. The traditional explanation is that the redactors of the Jerusalem Talmud were forced to finish their work abruptly. A more likely explanation is that the Babylonian Talmud benefited from another 1–2 centuries of redaction before its final completion. One new view, that of David Weiss Halivni, attributes the clearer and longer, more discursive framework of the Babylonian Talmud to a specific "Stammaitic" layer of redaction.

== Influence ==
The Jerusalem Talmud, and other classical rabbinic sources from the Land of Israel, strongly influenced Jewish practice there and in lands further west for many centuries, even forming the basis of many customs of early Ashkenazi Judaism. This influence is attested to in the works of Pirqoi ben Baboi (8th–9th century) and Sherira Gaon (10th century). Some traditions associated with the Jerusalem Talmud have been retained to this day, for example in the liturgy of the Italian Jews and Romaniotes.

Over time, the Babylonian Talmud became the canonical source for the life of Jews across the entire Jewish world. According to Leon Charney and Saul Mayzlish, the eventual priority of the Babylonian Talmud reflected not only literary or legal considerations, but a broader historical struggle between the rabbinic centers of the Land of Israel and Babylonia. The Babylonian academies benefited from the growth, wealth, and relative stability of the Jewish diaspora in Babylonia, while the rabbinic center in the Land of Israel was weakened by Roman repression, economic decline, and a shrinking base of support. Charney and Mayzlish argue that Babylonian scholars developed a religious and legal culture that justified Jewish life outside the Land of Israel and gradually displaced the authority of the Palestinian rabbinic tradition. As the institutions that sustained the Jerusalem Talmud declined, the Babylonian Talmud became the dominant text of rabbinic study and legal interpretation across the diaspora, and later halakhic authorities increasingly treated it as the primary talmudic authority.

Hai ben Sherira, on the preeminence of the Babylonian Talmud, wrote:

Anything that has been decided halachically in our Talmud (i.e. the Babylonian Talmud), we do not rely on [any contradictory view found in] the Jerusalem Talmud, seeing that many years have passed since instruction coming from there (i.e. the Land of Israel) had ceased on account of persecution, whereas here (i.e. in Babylonia) is where the final decisions were clarified.

Nevertheless, the Jerusalem Talmud was still accorded a certain status as a secondary work useful for the clarification of halakha. Regarding the Jerusalem Talmud's continued importance for the understanding of arcane matters, Hai ben Sherira wrote:

Whatever we find in the Jerusalem Talmud and there is nothing that contradicts it in our own Talmud (i.e. the Babylonian Talmud), or which gives a nice explanation for its matters of discourse, we can hold-on to it and rely upon it, for it is not to be viewed as inferior to the commentaries of the rishonim (i.e. the early exponents of the Torah).

A similar judgment was made by Ritva: "We always rely on their Talmud (i.e. the Jerusalem Talmud) and interpret and codify our Talmud (the Babylonian) based on their (the scholars of Yerushalmi) words."

Although the Babylonian Talmud became the dominant talmudic authority, the Jerusalem Talmud continued to play a role in medieval rabbinic learning. It was used especially by the Kairouan scholars Hananel ben Hushiel and Nissim ben Jacob, whose works compared Babylonian passages with parallels in the Jerusalem and helped transmit the latter's talmudic traditions to later authorities. Through these channels, knowledge of the Jerusalem Talmud reached parts of the Tosafist tradition in northern Europe, and it even came to be used by the likes of Maimonides in his legal writings. In modern scholarship, the Jerusalem Talmud remains a central source for the study of rabbinic law, institutions, language, and religious culture in late antique Jewish Palestine.

== Commentators ==
=== Premodern ===
There is no comprehensive commentary to the Jerusalem Talmud by any of the Rishonim, but explanations of many individual passages can be found in the literature of the Rishonim. Most significantly, Rabbi Samson ben Abraham of Sens (c. 1150 – c. 1230), known as the Rash, excerpts and explains many sections of the Jerusalem Talmud in his commentary to the Mishnah of Seder Zeraim. His work, however, is focused on the Mishnah and is not a comprehensive commentary on the entire Jerusalem Talmud.

Judah ben Yakar (died c. 1210) wrote a commentary to much of the Jerusalem Talmud, which was quoted by other rishonim but has now been lost.

Kaftor VaFerach, by Rabbi Ishtori Haparchi (1280–1355), a disciple of Rabbi Asher ben Jehiel, the Rosh, is one of the few surviving compositions of the Rishonim about all of Seder Zeraim. However it is a Halachic work and not per se a commentary on the Jerusalem Talmud.

The only surviving commentaries of Rishonim on the Jerusalem Talmud are the commentaries to Tractate Shekalim of Menachem Meiri, Meshulam ben David and Shemuel ben Shniur. All three of these commentaries are reprinted in the Mutzal Mi'Eish edition of the Jerusalem Talmud Tractate Shekalim.

Many Acharonim, however, wrote commentaries on all or major portions of the Jerusalem Talmud, and as with the Babylonian Talmud, many also wrote on individual tractates of the Jerusalem Talmud.

One of the first of the Acharonim to write a commentary on the Jerusalem Talmud was Solomon Sirilio (1485–1554), also known as Rash Sirilio, whose commentaries cover only the Seder Zeraim and the tractate Shekalim of Seder Moed. Sirilio's commentary remained in manuscript form until it was first printed in 1875. In the Vilna edition of the Jerusalem Talmud, Rash Sirilio appears only for tractates Berakhot and Pe'ah, but the commentary for the entire Seder Zeraim appears in the Mutzal Mi'Eish and Oz Vehadar editions. In addition to his commentary, Sirilio worked to remove mistakes made by manuscript copyists that over time had slipped into the text of the Jerusalem Talmud, and his amended text of the Gemara is reproduced alongside his commentary in the Vilna and Mutzal Mi'Eish editions.

Another 16th century commentary on the Yerushalmi is Rabbi Elazar ben Moshe Azikri's commentary to Tractates Berakhot and Betzah.

=== Modern ===
Today's modern printed editions almost all carry the commentaries, Korban ha-Eida, by David ben Naphtali Fränkel (c. 1704–1762) of Berlin on the orders of Moed, Nashim and parts of Nezikin, and Pnei Moshe, by Moses Margolies (c.1710?–1781) of Amsterdam on the entire Talmud. The Vilna edition also includes the Ridvaz by Rabbi Yaakov Dovid Wilovsky on most of the Talmud. The goal of all three of these commentaries is to explain the simple meaning of the Talmud similar to Rashi's commentary on the Bavli, and the authors each wrote an additional commentary—Sheyarei ha-Korban, Marei ha-Panim and Tosefot Rid respectively—that is meant to be a similar style to Tosafot.

Rabbi Chaim Kanievsky published a renowned commentary on the Jerusalem Talmud titled the Be'ur (literally, "Commentary") on tractates Berakhot through Nedarim (roughly 70% of the Jerusalem Talmud). Most of it is reprinted in the Oz Vehadar edition of the Yerushalmi. Rabbi Yitzchok Isaac Krasilschikov wrote the Toledot Yitzchak and Tevuna commentaries on tractates Berakhot through Rosh Hashanah (roughly 50% of the Jerusalem Talmud), which was published from his manuscript by the Mutzal Me-esh Institute.

A modern edition and commentary, known as Or Simchah, is currently being prepared in Arad; another edition in preparation, including paraphrases and explanatory notes in modern Hebrew, is Yedid Nefesh. The Jerusalem Talmud has also received some attention from Adin Steinsaltz, who planned a translation into modern Hebrew and accompanying explanation similar to his work on the Babylonian Talmud before his death. So far only Tractates Pe'ah and Shekalim have appeared.

== Translations into English ==
- The first volume, Berakhoth, was translated into English in 1886 by Dr. Moses Schwab, under the title "The Talmud of Jerusalem" . The author has an earlier translation into French, which covers many more volumes.
- Talmud of the Land of Israel: A Preliminary Translation and Explanation Jacob Neusner, Tzvee Zahavy, others. University of Chicago Press. This translation uses a form-analytical presentation that makes the logical units of discourse easier to identify and follow. Neusner's mentor Saul Lieberman, then the most prominent Talmudic scholar alive, read one volume shortly before his death and wrote a review, published posthumously, in which he describes dozens of major translation errors in the first chapter of that volume alone, also demonstrating that Neusner had not, as claimed, made use of manuscript evidence; he was "stunned by Neusner's ignorance of rabbinic Hebrew, of Aramaic grammar, and above all the subject matter with which he deals" and concluded that "the right place for [Neusner's translation] is the wastebasket". This review was devastating for Neusner's career. At a meeting of the Society of Biblical Literature a few months later, during a plenary session designed to honor Neusner for his achievements, Morton Smith (also Neusner's mentor) took to the lectern and announced that "I now find it my duty to warn" that the translation "cannot be safely used, and had better not be used at all". He also called Neusner's translation "a serious misfortune for Jewish studies". After delivering this speech, Smith marched up and down the aisles of the ballroom with printouts of Lieberman's review, handing one to every attendee.
- Schottenstein Edition of the Yerushalmi Talmud Mesorah/ArtScroll. This complete translation (to Hebrew and English) is the counterpart to Mesorah/ArtScroll's Schottenstein Edition of the Babylonian Talmud. The 51-volume set, completed in 2022, is the first and only Orthodox non-academic English translation of the Jerusalem Talmud.
- The Jerusalem Talmud ed. Heinrich Guggenheimer, Walter de Gruyter. This edition, which is a complete one for the entire Jerusalem Talmud, is a scholarly translation based on the editio princeps and upon the existing manuscripts. The text is fully vocalized and followed by an extensive commentary.
- Modern Elucidated Talmud Yerushalmi, ed. Joshua Buch. Uses the Leiden manuscript as its based text corrected according to manuscripts and Geniza Fragments. Draws upon Traditional and Modern Scholarship
