= Sara Hershey-Eddy =

American journalist

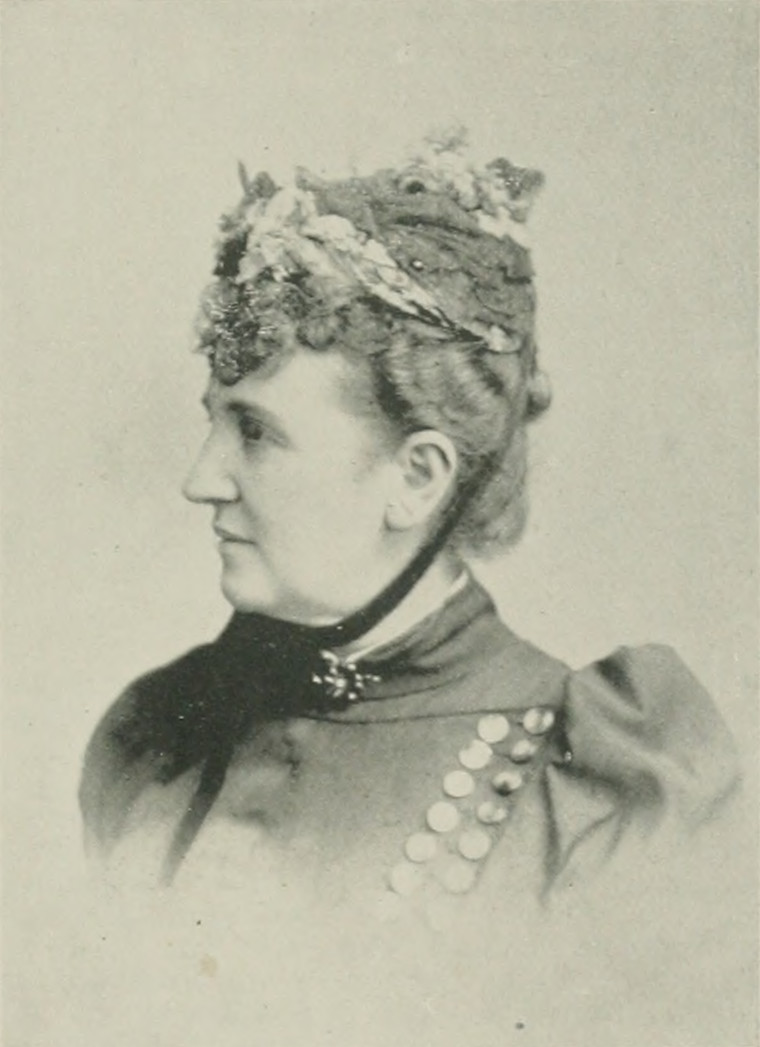
Sara Hershey-Eddy

Sara Hershey-Eddy (née Sarah Hershey; 1837 – 8 July 1911) was an American musician, pianist, contralto vocalist, vocal instructor, and musical educator. She founded the Hershey School of Musical Art in Chicago.

== Early years and education ==
Of Pennsylvania Dutch (German) ancestry, Sara Hershey was born in 1837, near Indiantown, Pennsylvania in Lancaster County, Pennsylvania, the daughter of Benjamin (died 1893) and Elizabeth Hershey. Her father was a lumber and farming businessman. Her mother was Elizabeth Witmer of Lancaster County, Pennsylvania. Sara had three sisters, Mary Amanda, Elizabeth and Mira. Elizabeth died in early maidenhood, at Muscatine in 1856, and Amanda died in Munich, Germany where she had gone to complete her studies, in December, 1876. Prior to going abroad she had for several years been chief accountant in her father's office. For several years past, after completing her studies abroad, Mira has taken an active interest in the operations of the Hershey Lumber Company and has held office therein as secretary and vice-president, before becoming a Hollywood hotel proprietor and property developer.

From childhood, Hershey has been musically inclined. At 14 years of age, she went to Philadelphia where she received her education and early musical training, signing in a church choir for several years. Bad training resulted in the ruin of her voice, and she turned her attention to the piano.

Upon leaving Philadelphia, she went to St. Mary's Hall (now Doane Academy), Burlington, New Jersey, where she remained a year and a half, when she came West with her parents to Muscatine, Iowa, and began teaching, going East at intervals for the purpose of study. In 1867, she went to Berlin, Germany, in order to finish her musical education, and became a pupil of Professor Julius Stern, in the Stern Conservatory, studying harmony, counterpoint, score-reading and piano-playing. She took vocal instruction from Jennie Mayer. This training was followed by piano study under Theodor Kullak of the Conservatory, and vocalization from Gustav Engel. She also was a pupil under Gottfried Weiss. During her sojourn in Germany, she found time to master the German language, and to gain a wide acquaintance with the German poets and dramas of the day.

After a stay of 3.5 years in Berlin, she went to Milan, Italy, where she studied singing with Professor Gerli, and visited the classes of the older Lamperti. During her stay at Milan, she devoted her entire attention to the Italian methods of opera-singing, and learned the Italian language. Having accomplished her aims in the Italian schools she went to London, England, and studied with Charlotte Sainton-Dolby, in oratorio and English singing, for a number of months.

== Career ==
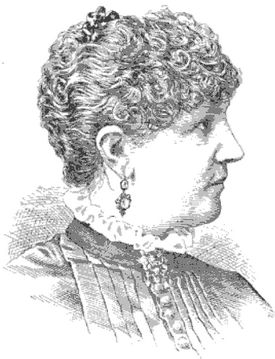
Sara Hershey-Eddy

Upon her return to the USA, she learned of the Great Chicago Fire in 1871. Changing her intention of locating in Chicago, she went to New York City, where she remained nearly two years, engaged in concert and church singing and giving instructions in music and singing at the Packer Collegiate Institute, of Brooklyn. She received an offer to take charge of the vocal department of the Pennsylvania Female College (now Chatham University), Pittsburgh, which she accepted, with a salary the largest ever paid to a woman teacher in that state. In the following year, she was induced to assume the entire control of the musical department of that institution.

In August, 1875, she came to Chicago and founded the Hershey School of Musical Art, with William Smythe Babcock Matthews, which become the leading institution of its kind in the West. The Hershey Music Hall, built by her father, was erected in 1876. It soon gained a national reputation, with Clarence Eddy as its general musical director. During the existence of this institution, it was remarkably successful in departments not generally successful in American schools. A large number of organists was trained; composers, who proved the excellence of their teaching by producing works large in style and presentable in quality, were given a hearing; and a considerable number of accomplished singers went forth to give recitals of song of every national school. It was upon his own organ in Hershey Music Hall that Eddy gave his great and unprecedented series of recitals of organ music, containing no repetitions. This remarkable task occupied nearly two years, the recitals occurring every Saturday. Over 500 compositions were performed, and every national school, old or new, was represented. The closing recital, June 23, 1879, was turned into an ovation, the program consisting almost entirely of original works written expressly for the occasion.

In 1879, she married Clarence Eddy. The responsibilities of such an institution, however, became too arduous, and in 1885, husband and wife retired to private teaching, with a large following of pupils. Their apartments offered a commanding view of Lake Michigan.

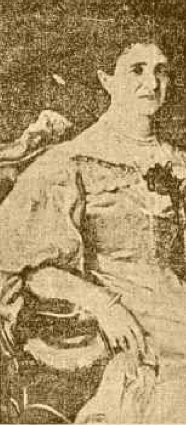
Sarah Hershey-Eddy

For years, Hershey-Eddy was a prominent member of the Music Teachers' National Association, and did much to make that organization a success. At Indianapolis, in June 1887, she was elected to the Board of Examiners in the vocal department in the American College of Musicians. She contributed a number of valuable articles to musical journals. In 1893, she was made vice-president of the Woman's Musical Congress at the World's Fair in Chicago, and was one of the Examining Committee of Musical Competition, of which Theodore Thomas was the presiding officer.

As a writer, she contributed to the columns of The Voice. She remarked in "Plea for More Singing": “Every voice should be sufficiently cultivated to produce an agreeable quality of tone and to sing a simple solo with good enunciation and with intelligence. This should belong to any scheme of education, and singing should, to this extent, rank side by side with the common branches of education as a necessary factor of human culture. Until the study of singing is dignified to this position and accepted as educational, and is not regarded merely as an accomplishment on a par with dancing, the children of our race will be deprived of its elevating and humanizing influences. Superficial playing or singing is wrong, because it is not only useless, but injurious, inasmuch as it is a bar to the progress of music and its adoption as a means of general culture. Until the sense of hearing is developed as a faculty, until our children are taught how to listen, how to analyze and methodize what is heard, this wonderful sense will remain only a latent instead of a most potent force in musical education. Let the ear and the understanding work together and advance side by side. There is no reason why a child should not as readily distinguish tones from semitones, and thirds from fifths, as it tells a from z.”

With Frederic Grant Gleason, Hershey-Eddy was a co-editor of The Musical Bulletin, published by the Hershey School of Musical Art. Published monthly, it contained articles on musical topics, programs and criticisms of performances, translations from foreign writers, reviews of new music, extracts from European journals, foreign and domestic correspondence, as well as general musical intelligence.

== Personal life ==
Hershey married three times. On September 1, 1857, she married William F. Brannan. They had at least one child, a daughter, Bessie. The marriage did not last long. She married Clarence Eddy, 14 years her junior, on July 1, 1879. After her father's death in 1893, she received a large inheritance. In 1895, Hershey-Eddy retired and moved to Paris. Eddy filed for divorce from his wife in 1905, noting desertion. She married John Darlington Marsh in London in July 1908. Hershey-Eddy died in Paris in 1911.

== Bibliography ==
- Andreas, A. T. (1886). History of Chicago from the Earliest Period to the Present Time, in Three Volumes. Vol. 3 - From the Fire of 1871 until 1885 (Public domain ed.). The A. T. Andreas Company.
- Bryan, Mary Lynn; Bair, Barbara (4 November 2002). The Selected Papers of Jane Addams: vol. 1: Preparing to Lead, 1860-81. University of Illinois Press. ISBN 978-0-252-09067-7.
- Hotchkiss, George Woodward (1898). History of the Lumber and Forest Industry of the Northwest (Public domain ed.). G.W. Hotchkiss & Company.
- Logan, Mrs. John A. (1912). The Part Taken by Women in American History (Public domain ed.). Perry-Nalle publishing Company. p. 769.
- Osborne, William (2000). Clarence Eddy (1851-1937): Dean of American Organists. Organ Historical Society. ISBN 978-0-913499-17-7.
- Otis, Philo Adams (1913). The First Presbyterian church, 1833-1913: a history of the oldest organization in Chicago, with biographical sketches of the ministers and extracts from the choir records. F. H. Revell Co. p. 96.
- Rowell, George Presbury (1882). Rowell's American Newspaper Directory (Public domain ed.). Printers' Ink Publishing Company.
- Werner, Edgar S. (1887). The Voice - Werner's Magazine: A Magazine of Expression. Vol. X, Issue 12 (Public domain ed.). Werner's Magazine Company.
- Willard, Frances Elizabeth (1893). A Woman of the Century: Fourteen Hundred-seventy Biographical Sketches Accompanied by Portraits of Leading American Women in All Walks of Life (Public domain ed.). Moulton. p. 271.
