= Hershey Creamery Company =

American pre-packaged ice cream and cold dessert maker

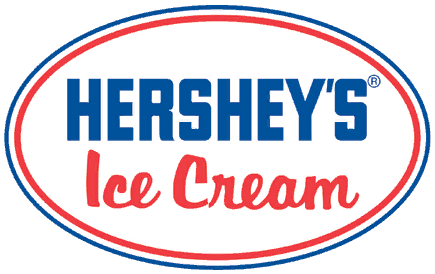
- Type: Public
- Traded as: Expert Market: HRCR
- Industry: Ice cream manufacturer
- Founded: 1894; 132 years ago in Lancaster, Pennsylvania U.S.
- Founders: Jacob Hershey; Isaac Hershey; John Hershey; Paris Hershey; Eli Hershey
- Headquarters: Harrisburg, Pennsylvania, U.S.
- Area served: Northeastern and Eastern United States
- Key people: George Holder, President; Matt Ryan, Executive Vice President; Tom Holder, Senior Vice President of sales and marketing Tom Holder, Jr. Vice President of Sales; Tim Ryan, Vice President of Operations; Zach Waite, Vice President of Production Development; Jim Holder, Vice President of Human Resources
- Products: Ice cream, sherbet, ice cream cake, frozen slab, smoothies
- Number of employees: 450
- Website: hersheyicecream.com

Hershey Creamery Company, also known as Hershey's Ice Cream, is an American creamery that produces ice cream, sorbet, sherbet, frozen yogurt, and other frozen desserts such as smoothies and frozen slab-style ice cream mixers. It was founded by Jacob Hershey and four of his brothers in 1894 and taken over by the Holder family in the 1920s. The company was one of the first to offer consumers pre-packaged ice cream pints.

The family-owned business has approximately 450 employees and operates 30 distribution centers in 28 states across the Eastern and Northeastern United States. It is a publicly traded company, with its stocks listed only on Pink Sheets as the company offers a limited number of shares to potential shareholders. In 1998, it modernized its operations to increase efficiency and reduce overhead.

Hershey Creamery Company has no affiliation to chocolate manufacturer The Hershey Company, though both companies were founded in Lancaster County, Pennsylvania, in the same year. The companies have had a tumultuous relationship marked by multiple lawsuits over trademark issues. In the mid-1990s, the companies settled their most recent legal battles out of court, with Hershey Creamery Company agreeing to add a disclaimer to its ice cream products to note that it is not affiliated with the Hershey Company.

== History ==
The Hershey brothers, Jacob, Isaac, John, Paris, and Eli, founded Hershey Creamery Company in 1894, with the company originally operating out of the Hershey family's Lancaster County farmhouse. The ice cream was packed in metal-lined wooden containers that the Hershey brothers designed and built. The containers were loaded into trucks with ice packed around them to keep the ice cream fresh and cold. Salesmen traveled daily routes to deliver product to customers in the county and in surrounding areas.

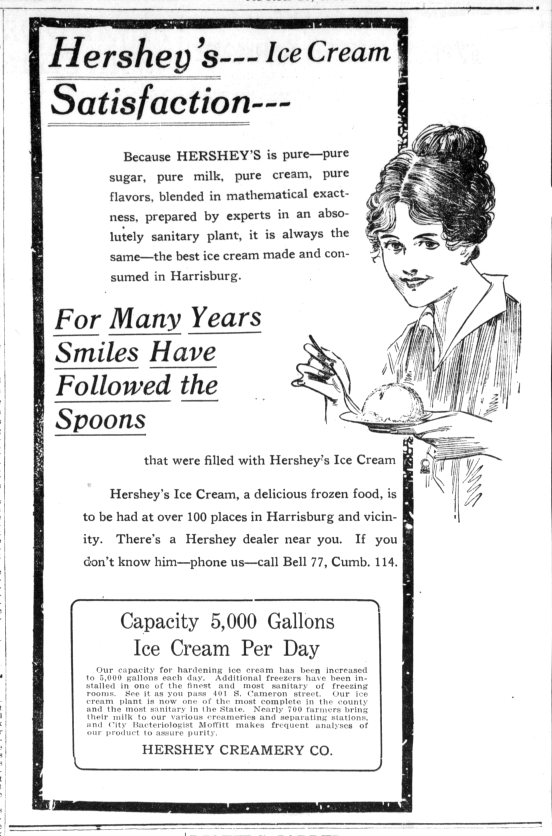
1920 advertisement

In 1920, the company acquired Marrow's Ice Cream in Lancaster, Pennsylvania. Marrow had a large facility in Lancaster at 425-429 East Orange Street, and was making up to 450 gallons of ice cream per day. The company was operated by George Brayton Marrow and he started his confectionery business in 1880. Marrow was one of the first men to make ice cream in large quantities in this era. In addition, Marrow made other confections as well. Hershey Creamery operated this factory into the late 1950s and finally closed this factory sometime in the late 1940s or early 1950s. Later, in the 1920's, the company was merged with the Holder family's Bethlehem-based Meyer Dairy Company, retaining the Hershey name. In 1926, with demand for the ice cream exceeding the capacity of the farmhouse, the newly merged company constructed its first ice cream plant in Harrisburg, Pennsylvania. During the Great Depression, the company became the first ice cream maker to offer its products in pre-packaged pints. It began creating new flavors of ice cream which it then sold to other ice cream makers. Following World War II, the company continued to answer the call for greater convenience in consumer foods and expanded its offerings to include single-serve, easy to eat items such as ice pops and ice cream sandwiches. In the 1960s, the Holder family assumed full ownership of the company.

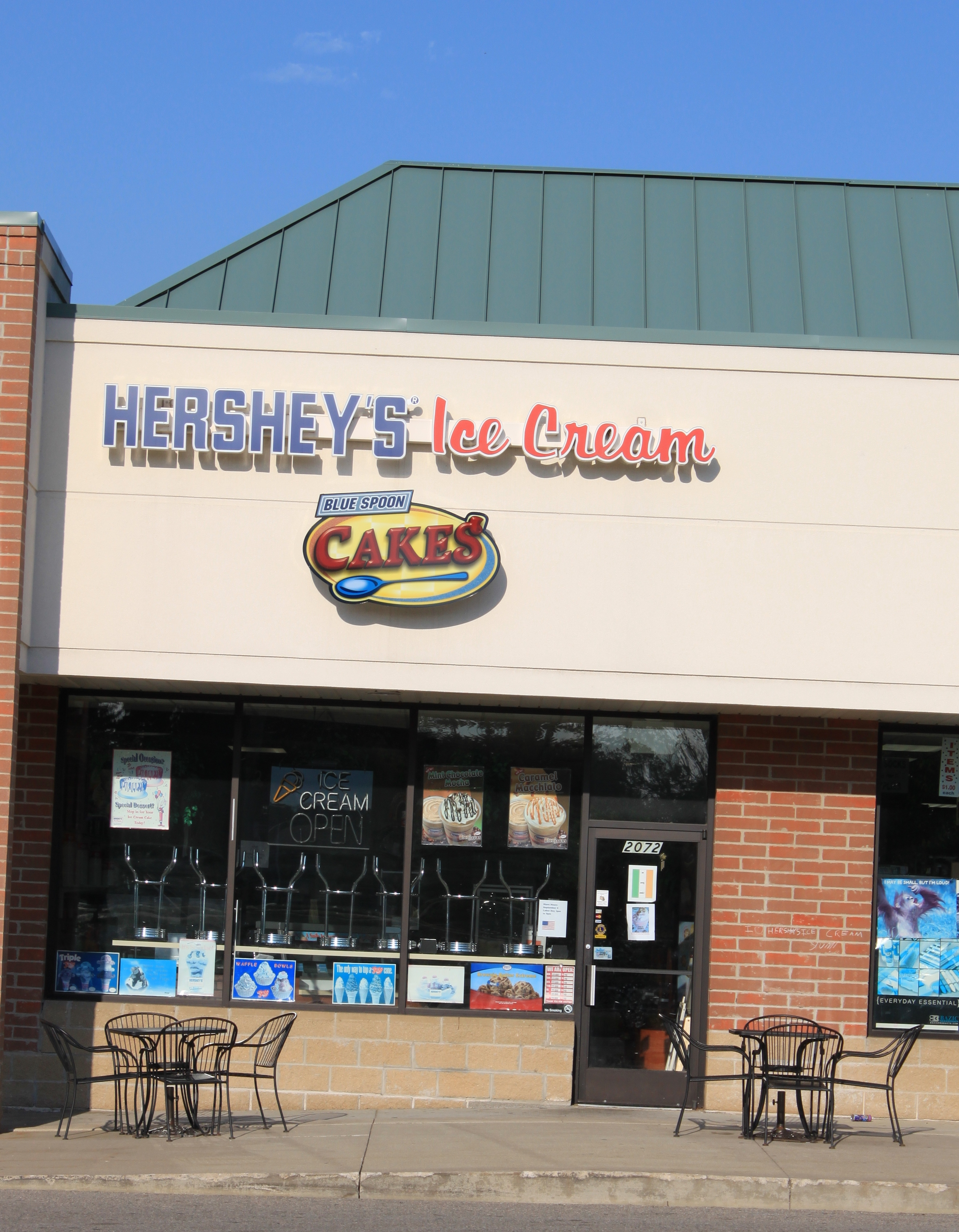
Hershey's ice cream shop, Ypsilanti Township, Michigan, 2010

As the company grew, it split its production operations, with the Harrisburg location mixing the ice cream and a new facility in Lower Swatara Township used for the actual hardening and packaging of the product. While local orders continued to be delivered in small Hershey's Ice Cream refrigerated trucks, the company shifted to transporting most of its ice cream to refrigerated tractor trailer trucks, enabling it to stretch its market beyond the state of Pennsylvania. It expanded its distribution facilities, eventually occupying 22 co-owned distribution centers. This enabled the company to ship products out more quickly after orders are received and resulted in less travel time for the products, ensuring freshness and quality were maintained. In the summer months, the company greatly increased its workforce and leased additional cold-storage space to help meet the seasonal orders, as the orders were prepared by hand. In 1998, operations were modernized and automated when the company purchased 105 acres (0.42 km^{2}) in nearby Middletown where it constructed a modern 1.3 million cubic foot warehouse, enabling it to boost its efficiency, reducing the need to increase its summer workforce, and reducing the frequent product loss caused by hand orders and inefficient packing systems. The modernization of its warehouse also improved inventory management, order accuracy, and has helped the company continue its growth.

=== Trademark disputes with Hershey Company ===
Hershey Creamery has been involved in multiple legal disputes with the similarly named Hershey Company, founded around the same time in the city of Lancaster by Milton S. Hershey; despite the proximity, Milton Hershey has no relation to the founding Hershey brothers. The first troubles came after the Hershey Creamery began producing chocolate candy and cocoa. Milton S. Hershey learned of the candies in 1919, and assigned Charles Ziegler to "find instances of confusion and infringement and of unfair competition". Ziegler found that in addition to making similar products, the packaging used on the chocolates resembled that used by Hershey Company—then called Hershey Chocolate. Investigating complaints from retailers in Boston, New York, Binghamton, Norfolk, and Richmond, Ziegler reportedly found that retailers were confusing the two products, and sometimes deliberately replacing the higher priced Hershey Company products with the Hershey Creamery products. In Harrisburg, Ziegler found a display of Hershey Creamery "Hershey Kisses", which were bite-sized chocolate drops similar to the chocolate company's creations. After cease and desist letters failed to resolve the problem, Milton Hershey filed suit in 1921 in U.S. District Court for trademark infringement. In 1926, a judge partially sided with Hershey Chocolate and prohibited the creamery from using the name Hershey's in connection with "manufacture, advertisement, distribution, or sale of, among other things, chocolate, cocoa, chocolate confections, and chocolate or cocoa products".

In 1958, the creamery registered for and was granted the "Hershey's" trademark for use with ice cream and butter products. Seven years later, the company filed suit in U.S. District Court against Hershey Company and Consolidated Foods Corporation after learning the companies were planning to partner to make a line of Hershey's branded ice cream bars. Hershey Creamery alleged "trademark infringement, unfair competition, false designation of origin, false descriptions, and false representations", to which Hershey Chocolate responded with a counterclaim questioning the validity of the trademark, claiming it was fraudulently obtained. The companies settled out of court the following year, with the creamery agreeing to drop "butter" from its trademark and fix a filing error with it, and allowing Hershey Company to release the licensed bars within certain guidelines. Hershey Company also agreed not to challenge the creamery's "Hershey's" trademark for use on ice cream again.

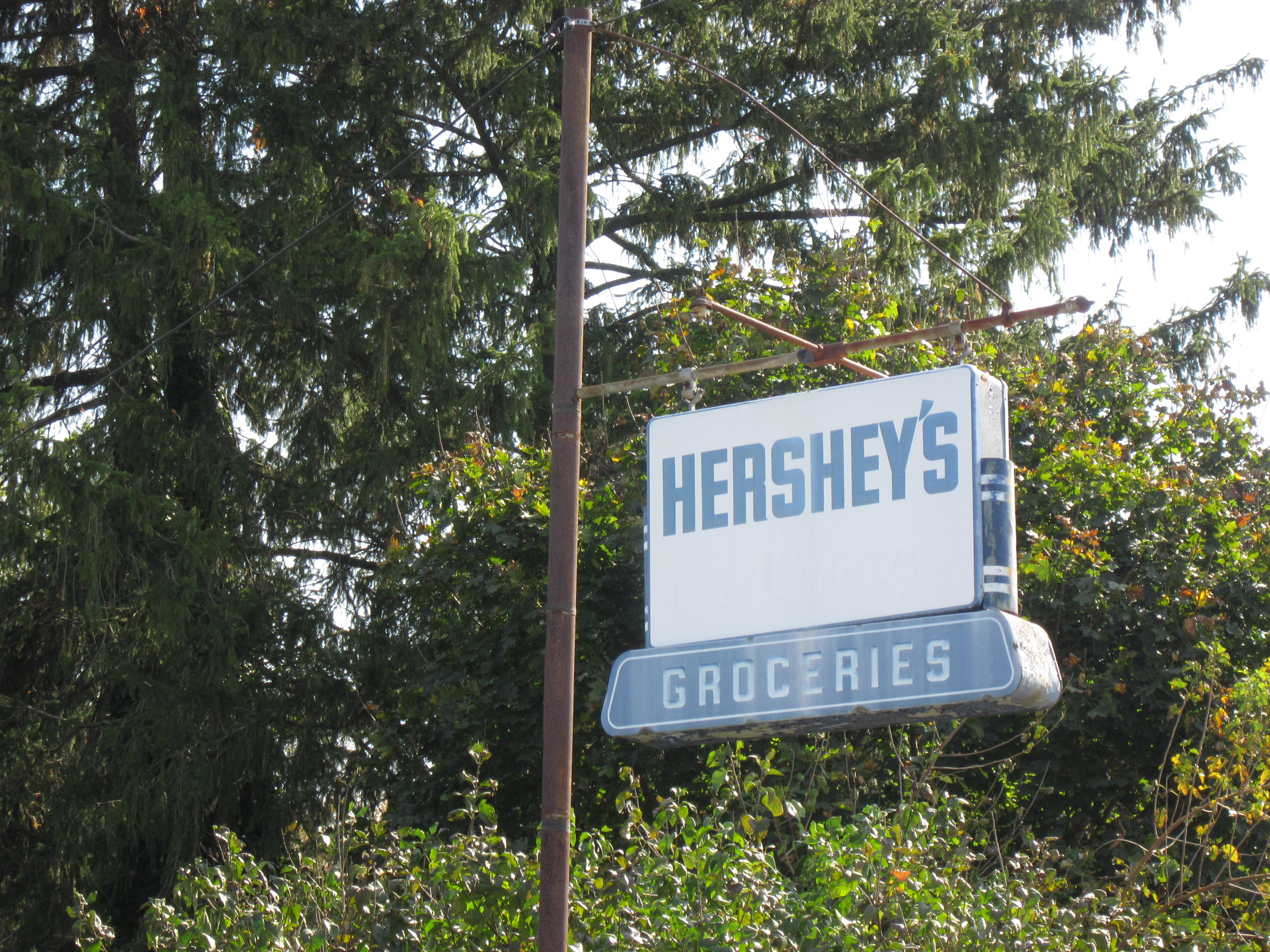
An old Hershey grocery sign in Falmouth, Pennsylvania pictured in 2011

Shortly after this, Hershey Creamery expanded its trademark to include other ice cream products: "ice cream, ice milk, sherbet, water ice, and frozen confections in which ice cream, ice milk, sherbet or water ice is a component". In 1989, the creamery expanded its products to include frozen yogurt and filed for a new trademark for this new line of products. Upon learning of the registration request, the Hershey Company—then named Hershey Foods—demanded the company cease production of the products claiming it violated Hershey Company's trademarks. The creamery dropped its application, but continued releasing the products, so in May 1990, Hershey Company filed suit in the U.S. District Court for the Middle District of Pennsylvania seeking a legal injunction to stop Hershey Creamery from producing and marketing its Hershey's branded frozen yogurt, as well as to attempt to stop the company from using the "Hershey's" trademark outside of its "traditional thirteen-state trading area" and to demand that the company include a disclaimer disavowing its relation to Hershey Company on all of its products. Hershey Creamery countersued in the U.S. District Court for the Southern District of New York, concerned that Hershey Company demands reneged on the 1967 settlement, and requested the Pennsylvania court actions be transferred to the New York court as that was where the settlement was originally handled. The request was denied and the court instead blocked the Hershey Creamery's suit in New York. The Creamery appealed but this was denied.

After three years in court, the two companies again settled, with Hershey Creamery agreeing to put a disclaimer on all of its products, corporate website, and in promotional materials and press releases. On their website, the disclaimer simply notes "not affiliated with Hershey's Chocolate".

=== Other legal issues ===
In November 2008, Hershey Creamery Company became the first company in the nation to be prosecuted and fined for failing to implement a Risk Management Program (RMP) as required by the Clean Air Act. The charges were brought by the Environmental Protection Agency (EPA), which stated that the company failed to develop the required plans with regard to its storage and use of anhydrous ammonia, which is a regulated substance. In the charges, the EPA noted that the creamery twice certified that it had developed the RMP plan, once in 1999 and again in 2004. Later inspection showed that the certifications were false and on December 7, 2006, the EPA issued a civil compliance order against the company, ordering the company to come into compliance. Hershey Creamery complied and in April 2007 submitted the appropriate RMPs, which were confirmed to be in-place through subsequent inspection. The case was heard at the Federal Middle District court of Pennsylvania, with Hershey Creamery pleading guilty to the charges; it was subsequently fined $100,000 and given a year probation.

== Business model ==
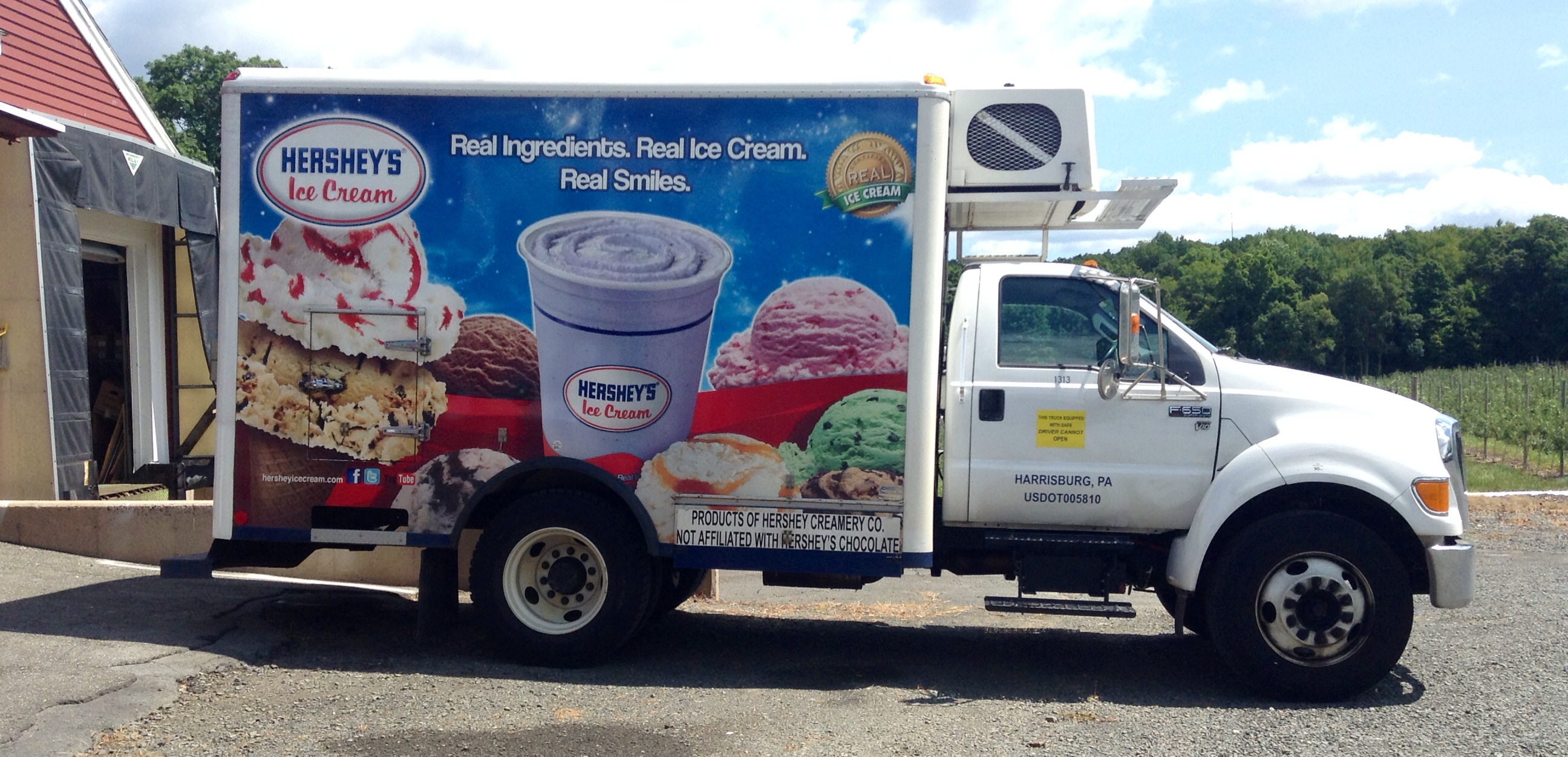
Hershey's ice cream truck in 2014

Hershey Creamery is a family operated business, with each new generation raised to assume roles within the company hierarchy upon graduation of high school. As of 2009, George Holder is its president, while his younger brothers, Walter and Tom, are vice president of manufacturing and vice president of sales and marketing, respectively. The company has approximately 450 employees.

The company operates 22 distribution centers, which serve some 22,000 clients in 28 states across the eastern United States, with Florida, Illinois, and the Carolinas being its newest market areas after its 2005 expansion. Since 1996, management has focused on the company's main distribution center rather than expansion outside of existing footprint. In 2003, it shifted its focus to moving its operations from the Harrisburg area, which is flood-prone and landlocked, to the Lower Swatara area. It opened a distribution center there in 1998, and plans to shift its headquarters and production facilities there over the next five to ten years. Unlike other ice cream makers, Hershey Creamery maintains ownership over its delivery trucks, distribution centers and warehouses, a practice the Holder family feels is important to maintaining the traditions of the "private, conservative" company.

Sales are primarily derived from branded ice cream parlors, quick-serve restaurants, and the distribution of its pre-packaged items to convenience stores, food service operators such as schools, hospitals, prisons, military installations, sports stadiums, amusement parks, and assisted living centers. Pre-packaged items are also sold in regional supermarkets, but this accounts for a minority of the company's sales.

=== Financials ===
Hershey Creamery Company is a publicly traded company, with only 36,000 shares available, which are listed on Pink Sheets (OTCID Basic: HRCR) and sold via the over-the-counter market. The company has fewer than 500 shareholders, primarily among the Holder family. Its stocks are considered to be "thinly traded" in that its shares are rarely traded, and then only a few shares are sold at a time. In 2006, the company maintained a 6.2 to 1 price-to-earnings ratio with no long-term debt and shareholders receive quarterly dividends and special dividends.

In 1936, the company shares traded at $2.01 per share. The value of the stock continued to grow steadily and by 1996, shares were trading at $2,300 per share; and hitting as high as $3,600 a share in 2003. Though not required to provide U.S. Securities and Exchange Commission (SEC) filings, the company does distribute similar-style reports to its shareholders annually, and in the 1930s and 40s, its annual earnings were reported in the Christian Science Monitor. In 1936, the company reported a net income of $195,077, up nearly $10,000 from its 1935 earnings of $185,320. As the company grew, so did its earnings. In 2001, the company reported sales of $91.4 million, giving it a net profit of $4.6 million.

Hershey Creamery ranked No. 90 in Dairy Foods magazine's 2005 list of the top 100 dairy companies, which ranks dairy companies based on annual sales. This was one rank higher than its 2004 rank of 91st.

=== Products ===
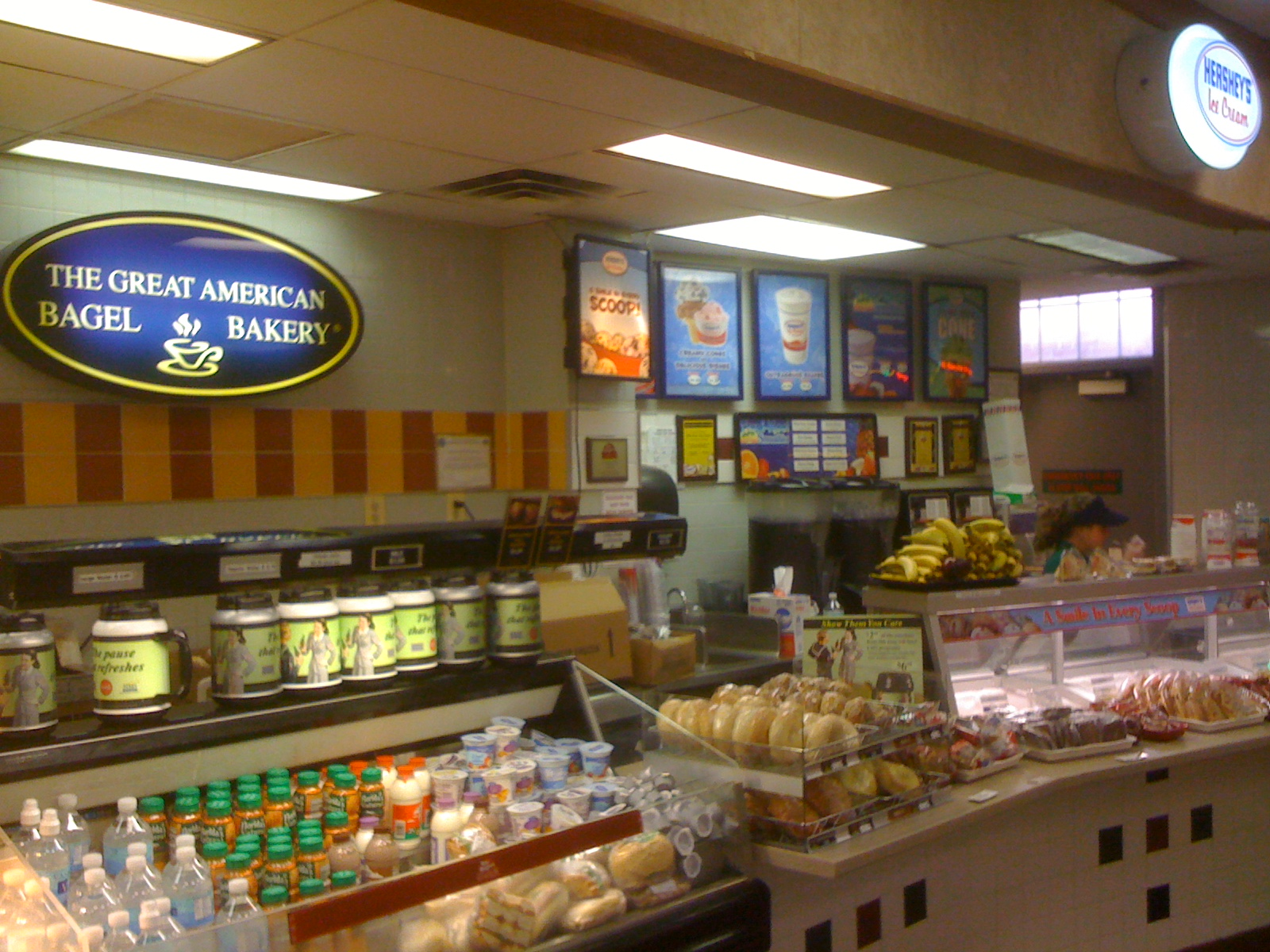
Some Hershey ice cream products for sale at Maryland House, 2009

As of 2009, Hershey Creamery Company offered 108 flavors of regular, hand-dipped premium ice cream, with 31 of those varieties marked as super premium gold rim products and 4 available in no sugar added (NSA) varieties that use the alternate sweetening product Splenda. Additionally, it offers two flavors of sorbet, three flavors of sherbet, and eight flavors of frozen yogurt. For pre-packaged half-gallons, the company offers consumers 32 ice cream flavors, including 4 no-fat varieties of its basic flavors and five sherbet flavors. In pints, it offers 13 flavors in its traditional square packaging and 15 flavors in its newer round pint packaging, including 2 limited edition and 2 no-sugar added varieties. It also offers three basic pre-made ice cream cakes.

In addition to these traditional ice cream treats, Hershey Creamery offers a variety of novelty ice cream treats, including ice cream sandwiches, Ice pops, sundae cups, ice cream sticks, squeeze ups, and pre-made cones.

== See also ==
- List of dairy product companies in the United States
