= Hershey Trust Company =

United States corporation

- Type: Private
- Industry: Trust administration, Investment, Real Estate
- Founded: April 28, 1905; 121 years ago in Hershey, Pennsylvania, U.S.
- Founders: Milton S. Hershey; Harry Lebkicher; John E. Snyder
- Headquarters: Hershey, Pennsylvania, U.S.
- Key people: Maria T. Kraus (board chair); Leslie K. Lenzo (CEO/CIO)
- Owner: Milton Hershey School Trust
- Website: hersheytrust.com

The Hershey Trust Company is an American trust company based in Hershey, Pennsylvania, established in 1905. Its sole business is the management of several charitable trusts endowed by Milton S. Hershey. The largest is the Milton Hershey School Trust, which has $17.4 billion of assets as of 2021, including Hershey Entertainment and Resorts Company and a controlling stake in The Hershey Company.

== History ==
On April 28, 1905, the Pennsylvania Department of State issued a charter creating the Hershey Trust Company, which was incorporated by Milton S. Hershey, Harry Lebkicher and John E. Snyder. It provided banking services and mortgages to residents of Hershey and the surrounding Derry Township. In 1909, when Hershey founded the Milton Hershey School, he appointed Hershey Trust as administrator of the school trust.

In 1925, Hershey Trust established Hershey National Bank as a subsidiary to handle its commercial banking business, allowing the parent company to focus on the growing demands of managing the school trust.

Milton Hershey died in 1945 and bequeathed the stock of Hershey Trust to the Milton Hershey School Trust.

The company sold the Hershey Bank to PNC Financial in 1986. Meanwhile, the Hershey School Trust sold portions of its stock in Hershey Foods and diversified its assets, leading to an expansion in staff to manage a wider portfolio. With its larger staff and new expertise, the company in 1989 began actively seeking customers for private wealth management services. The Hershey Trust Company moved its offices to the Milton S. Hershey Mansion in 1991 to gain more space for its staff.

Hershey Trust's wealth management business was sold to Bryn Mawr Trust Co. in 2011 for $18 million. By this time, it had grown to 500 clients with $1.1 billion of managed assets.

In February 2011, Robert Reese (grandson of H. B. Reese the inventor of Reese's Peanut Butter Cups), a former board member and president of the Trust, filed a lawsuit against the Hershey Trust Company alleging that board members had been improperly using the Trust's money. Reese withdrew the lawsuit in April 2011, due to deteriorating health. In 2013, Kathleen Kane, the Pennsylvania Attorney General, announced the conclusion of a two-year investigation into the operations of the Hershey Trust Company, in which the Office of Attorney General and the Hershey Trust Company agreed that there was a finding of no wrongdoing, but reforms were required of the trust company.

In May 2016, the state attorney general asked the company to remove three members from the ten-person board. The attorney general said that the three had allowed "apparent violations" of the 2013 agreement. At about the same time, in an unrelated investigation, John Estey was fired by the company due to the illegal activity.

== Trusts ==
=== Milton Hershey School Trust ===
Hershey Trust serves as the trustee of the Milton Hershey School Trust. The trust provides the funding for the 2,000+ student Milton Hershey School, which provides education for lower-income children. As of 2021, the trust had $17.4 billion of assets. Its assets include Hershey Entertainment and Resorts Company, a controlling stake in the Hershey Company, and ownership of the Hershey Trust Company itself.

The trust was created in 1909 by a deed of trust from Milton and Catherine Hershey, granting 486 acres (197 ha) of land in Hershey for the establishment of the Milton Hershey School. In 1918, Milton Hershey quietly donated to the trust the bulk of his fortune, $60 million of stock in Hershey Chocolate Company (now the Hershey Company).

In 2020, courts approved the school's plan to open six preschools in Pennsylvania that would offer free services to children from low-income homes. The Hershey School Trust provided $350 million to establish the early childhood centers, the first of which was opened in 2023. The plan arose partly in response to public pressure on Hershey Trust to use more of its accumulated wealth for the public good.

=== Milton S. Hershey Foundation ===
The company administers the Milton S. Hershey Foundation, which operates:

- Hershey Cemetery
- Hershey Community Archives
- Hershey Gardens
- The Hershey Story (museum)
- Hershey Theatre

The foundation also endowed the Penn State Milton S. Hershey Medical Center in 1963 through a gift of $50 million using funds provided by the Milton Hershey School Trust.

=== Other trusts ===
Hershey Trust also serves as trustee of the Hershey Cemetery Perpetual Care Maintenance Trust.

The company was trustee of the Milton S. Hershey Testamentary Trust until 2012. This trust was established in 1945 upon Milton Hershey's death, endowed with his remaining fortune of $900,000, for the benefit of the Derry Township School District. The trust assets grew to $24 million as of 2012, supporting an annual payment to the school district of $1.8 million.
