= Gift Card Granny =

American online discount gift card retailer and comparison site

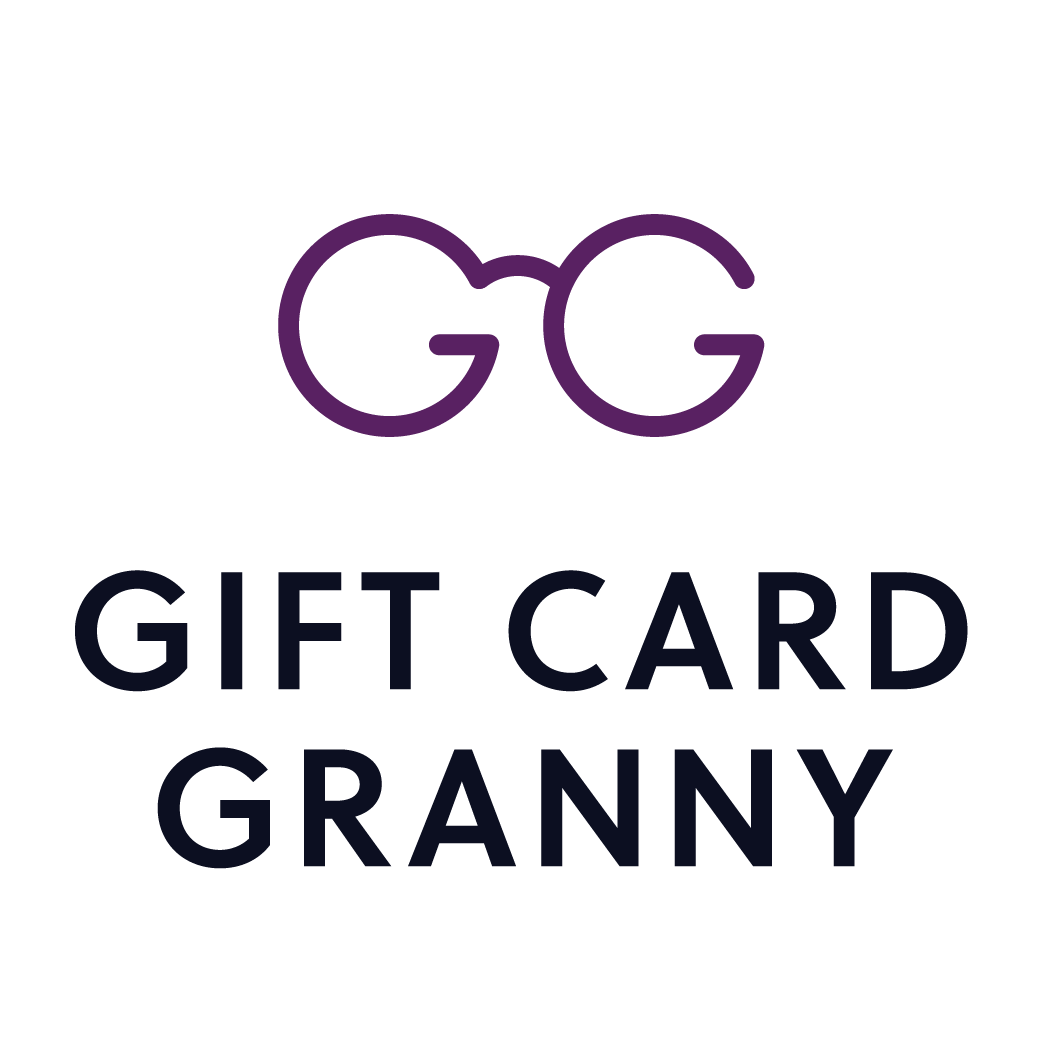
- Type: Private
- Industry: Gift card
- Founded: 2009; 17 years ago
- Founder: Luke Knowles
- Headquarters: Pittsburgh, PA, U.S.
- Area served: United States
- Key people: Jason Wolfe (CEO)
- Products: Discount gift cards
- Parent: Wolfe, LLC
- Website: www.giftcardgranny.com

Gift Card Granny (or GiftCardGranny.com) is an American online discount gift card platform based near Pittsburgh, Pennsylvania. The website allows consumers to search for and purchase discounted gift cards from a range of retailers. The platform lists gift cards from more than 1,000 retailers and features over 100,000 individual listings.

Gift Card Granny is a subsidiary of Wolfe, LLC, a Pittsburgh-based holding company led by founder and CEO Jason Wolfe, whose portfolio also includes PerfectGift.com, GiftYa, and GiveInKind.

== History ==
=== Foundation ===
Gift Card Granny was founded by Luke Knowles in Fort Collins, Colorado in 2009. It was part of several sites Knowles had founded that were collectively called "The Frugals," alongside Coupon Sherpa and Free Shipping Day. At the time of its launch, Gift Card Granny was the first gift card comparison site of its kind. For most of the website's early years, Gift Card Granny was run solely by Knowles.

=== Acquisition by Wolfe, LLC ===
In 2013, the website was acquired by internet entrepreneur and founder of GiftCards.com, Jason Wolfe, and his company, Wolfe.com. After GiftCards.com was acquired in early 2016 by Blackhawk Network Holdings, Wolfe became Gift Card Granny's CEO. In December 2016, Wolfe moved the company to Green Tree, Pennsylvania (a Pittsburgh suburb) to the same facility that had earlier housed GiftCards.com. The company currently employs 39 people.

In 2017, Gift Card Granny announced an alliance with the National Cyber-Forensics and Training Alliance aimed at reducing fraud in the online gift card marketplace.

== Operation ==
Gift Card Granny serves as a listing aggregator for discounted gift cards. The site partners with a variety of discount gift card companies and merchants.

Gift Card Granny lists gift cards from over 1,000 different stores, including Walmart, Olive Garden, Starbucks, Home Depot, Target, and Macy's. In total, in 2015 there were over 100,000 gift cards listed on the website.
