= Jason Wolfe =

Jason Wolfe may refer to:

- Jason Wolfe (ice hockey) (born 1977), American ice hockey player and coach
- Jason Wolfe (entrepreneur), American businessman and entrepreneur
- Jason Wolfe (racing driver) (born 1994), American racing driver
