= Hershey's Chocolate World =

American visitor and indoor attraction center

Coordinates: 40.288136°N 76.661117°W

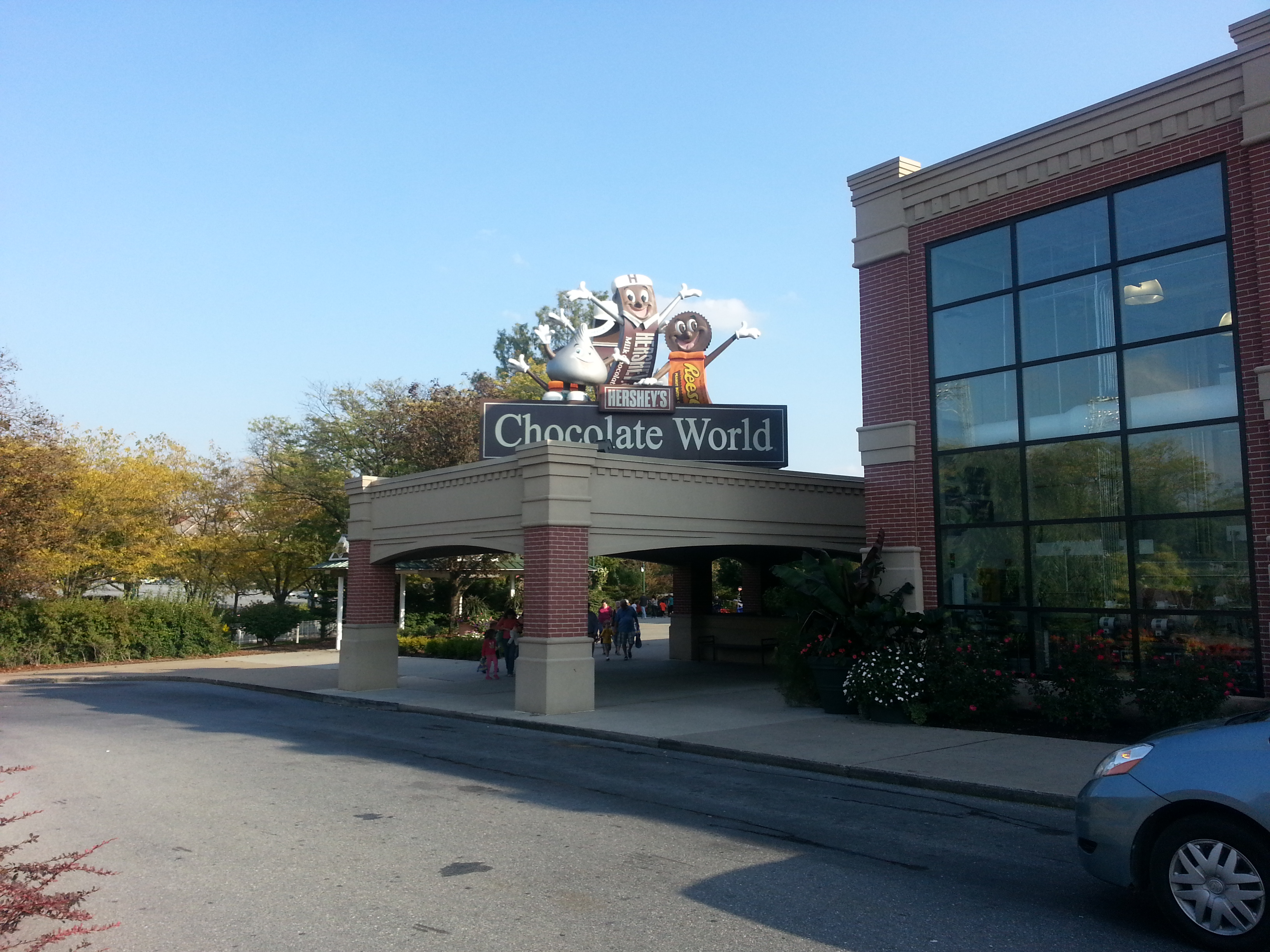
- Hershey's Chocolate World in Hershey, Pennsylvania in 2012

General information
- Type: Visitor center/Indoor attraction center
- Location: Hershey; Paradise; Niagara Falls; Times Square; Singapore
- Opening: June 30, 1973
- Owner: The Hershey Company

Technical details
- Floor count: 2

Website
- chocolateworld.com hersheyschocolateworldlasvegas.com

Hershey's Chocolate World is the name of five visitor centers that started in Hershey, Pennsylvania, United States. Open year-round, Hershey's Chocolate World offers marketplace shops and restaurants, specializing in Hershey's chocolate products. Attractions include Hershey's Great Candy Expedition, the Hershey Trolley Works, Create Your Own Candy Bar, Hershey's Unwrapped: A Chocolate Tasting Journey, and a free Hershey’s Chocolate Tour ride.

The first Hershey's Chocolate World is located off of Hersheypark Drive, in Hershey, Pennsylvania, and is in an entertainment complex that also includes Hersheypark, Hersheypark Stadium, Hersheypark Arena, Hershey Museum, and Giant Center. The Las Vegas location is where the Broadway Theatre used to be.

Although Hersheypark and Chocolate World are in the same complex, both operate independently of each other. Chocolate World is owned by The Hershey Company, while Hersheypark is owned by Hershey Entertainment and Resorts Company (HE&R). However, the Hershey Company and HE&R are both owned by the Hershey Trust Company.

Parking is available via a separate lot that is free for the first two hours only, or via the Hersheypark parking lot (when the park is open), which offers a tram service to and from Hershey's Chocolate World. While the facility is open year-round (except Christmas), hours vary depending on the season, ranging anywhere from 9 am to 11 pm.

== History ==
Hershey's Chocolate World was built as a replacement of the Hershey chocolate plant tour, which had reached its capacity and no longer was able to handle the large numbers of visitors per year. The facility opened on June 30, 1973, and took inspiration from World's Fair pavilions. Through its first year of operations, Chocolate World had over 1.4 million visitors. In its first thirteen years of operation, the visitor center received 20 million visitors.

A $4.5 million update to the chocolate-making tour ride opened in 1988, featuring a curious robot for a host named CP-1. It was phased out within a year. In the mid-1990s, the ride saw numerous revisions on a small scale, including the removal of several show elements. The last renovation occurred in early 2016 when several scenes in the chocolate tour ride were replaced. Today, there are still portions of the ride that have changed very little from the 1978 updated version, including the sorting and cleaning, roll refining, milling, and chocolate conching scenes.

The building features brownstone quarried out of the neighboring town of Hummelstown. In 2014, the retail area received major renovations as well as a new entrance and queue area for Hershey's Chocolate Tour.

Following the June 3, 2014 opening of its Paradise, Nevada location, Hershey then rebranded all other visitor centers worldwide under the Hershey's Chocolate World name. In July 2016, it was announced that Hershey's Chocolate World would expand to a new location in Times Square, New York City, and open in late 2017.

In 2022, it was announced that the 4D Chocolate movie would close to make way for "a better experience" This new attraction would be revealed as "Hershey's Great Candy Expedition", which was added as a part of Chocolate World's 50th anniversary.

== Current attractions ==
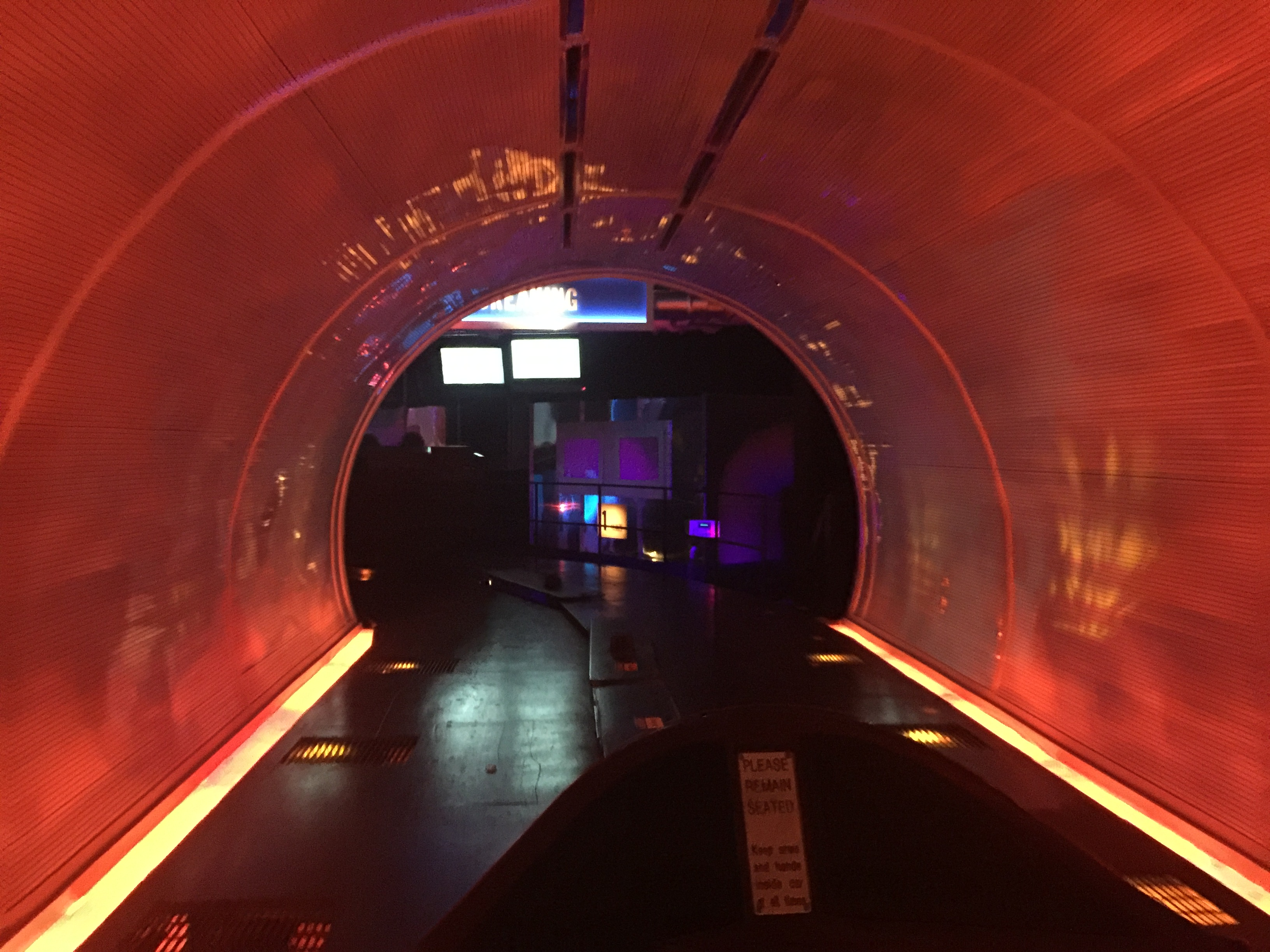
A memorable sequence from the Chocolate Tour ride, where cars travel inside a roaster with special effects

- Hershey's Chocolate Tour – An Endless Transit System-style dark ride special system manufactured by Arrow Development, and themed by R. Duell and Associates, which opened on June 30, 1973. This ride is an original attraction, showing a simulation of the chocolate making process. Since opening, the ride has been updated numerous times, and as of 2024, the ride features multiple singing cows. The tour is free of charge and concludes with a free sample of a Hershey's product. A ride photo is available for purchase. This attraction is only available in Hershey.
- Hershey's Great Candy Expedition – An interactive theater experience where guests travel through different candy worlds on a "cinematic train-themed adventure" using special effects and projection mapping, which opened on May 19, 2023.
- Create-Your-Own Candy Bar – A factory experience attraction for all ages. Guests wear a hair-net and apron as they enter an actual manufacturing line atmosphere and will get to choose from a number of inclusion ingredients to add to their own personal chocolate bar. As the bar makes its journey down the assembly line, guests will design and personalize the package that their bar will be placed in. This attraction is replaced with the Create-Your-Own Hershey's Chocolate Wrapper in the Las Vegas version, at which visitors will create their own wrapper, inside which is then placed a Hershey's Bar.
- Hershey Trolley Works – Most commonly spotted on the streets of Hershey is the fern green, old-fashioned trolley. Added in 1988, the trolley, with singing conductors, departs for a round-trip tour of the town of Hershey, pointing out historical and cultural observations along the way. Shows leave throughout the day and paid admission is required for this attraction. The 75-minute "Historical Trolley Tour" is available year-round, the entertaining "Summer Family Trolley" tour runs from Memorial Day to Labor Day, The “Trick-or-Treat Trolley” shows during the fall season, and the "Holly Jolly Trolley" shows during the Christmas season. This attraction is not available in the Las Vegas version along with the Chocolate Tour.
- Hershey's Unwrapped: A Chocolate Tasting Journey – Added on May 20, 2019, this attraction is a 30-minute theatrical show at the “Hershey Academy.”

The rest of Hershey's Chocolate World contains various shops selling Hershey souvenirs and chocolate, and several counter service meal locations (Bake Shoppe, Hershey's Courtyard Food Court, and Hershey's Ice Cream Shop). The main candy store is one of the largest stores of its kind in the world selling Hershey's products including new items not widely released, and premium chocolate brands such as Scharffen Berger Chocolate.
