= Milton Hershey School =

Private boarding school in Hershey, Pennsylvania, United States

Location
- 1201 Homestead Lane; Hershey, Dauphin County, Pennsylvania 17033; United States; 40°16′12″N 76°37′36″W

Information
- Former name: Hershey Industrial School
- School type: Independent boarding school
- Religious affiliation: Nonsectarian
- Established: 15 November 1909
- Founder: Milton Hershey
- Status: Open
- CEEB code: 391760
- NCES School ID: 01200519
- President: Peter G. Gurt
- Principals: PK–4: Amanda Smith 5-8: Danielle Peirson 9-12:Jen McConnell
- Faculty: 222.1 (on an FTE basis)
- Grades: PK–12
- Gender: Coeducational
- Enrollment: 2,171 (2019–2020)
  - Pre-kindergarten: 10
  - Kindergarten: 31
  - Grade 1: 54
  - Grade 2: 89
  - Grade 3: 104
  - Grade 4: 128
  - Grade 5: 154
  - Grade 6: 181
  - Grade 7: 205
  - Grade 8: 226
  - Grade 9: 261
  - Grade 10: 268
  - Grade 11: 257
  - Grade 12: 213
- Student to teacher ratio: 9.8
- Hours in school day: 7.3
- Campus size: 7,500 acres (3,000 ha)
- Colors: Brown and gold
- Nickname: Spartans
- Endowment: $15.91 billion
- Revenue: $1.44 billion
- Affiliations: The Hershey Company, NAIS, & TABS
- Website: www.mhskids.org

The Milton Hershey School, formerly the Hershey Industrial School, is a private boarding school in Hershey, Pennsylvania for K–12 students. The institution was founded in 1909 by chocolate industrialist Milton Hershey and his wife, Catherine Hershey.

The school began with four students in 1910. Initially, for only white male orphans, the school expanded in the 1960s and 1970s to include girls, racial minorities, and "social orphans"—those with impoverished parents. About 2,000 students attended the school in 2020. Admission is restricted to low-income individuals aged 4–15 who do not have intellectual or behavioral problems. Students live in group homes of uniform sex and similar age, with set schedules for elementary, middle, and high school students. The school has Christian elements but is officially non-sectarian.

The school is free for students and is funded by a trust containing most of Hershey's fortune, valued at about US$15 billion, making it the wealthiest U.S. private school. Nearly half of the trust's money comes from its controlling interest in Hershey's eponymous chocolate company.

== History ==
Milton S. Hershey, creator of The Hershey Company, was a chocolate industrialist and had founded the town of Hershey, Pennsylvania. On November 15, 1909, he and his wife, Catherine Hershey, signed over a 486-acre (1.97 km^{2}) piece of farmland, forming the Hershey Industrial School. The school accepted "poor, healthy, white male orphans" between the ages of four and eight, allowing them to stay until the age of eighteen. The first four boys were admitted in September 1910.

In 1918, following Catherine's death three years earlier, Milton put most of his fortune—including his share of the company's stock—into a trust for the school, valued at $60 million altogether. The school grew quickly, with about 60 boys in 1915, 352 boys in 1931, and 1034 boys in 1937. Non-sectarian Christian religious training was mandatory.

In 1933, the age range for admitted orphans was expanded from 4–8 years to 4–14 years. In 1934, a junior-senior high school building was opened at the site with a capacity for 1500 students. Hershey resigned from the school's board in 1944, a year before his death. By then, the school had acquired about 10,000 acres of land. The school's name was changed from Hershey Industrial School to Milton Hershey School in 1953, reportedly to eliminate the possibility of "industrial" connoting a reform school.

Following a 1968 decision upheld by the U.S. Supreme Court, which ordered the racial desegregation of Girard College, Milton Hershey School admitted its first non-white student. School official James E. Bobb, however, stated that the decision to admit racial minorities was unrelated to the ruling.

In 1976, the school expanded its definition of orphanhood to include "social orphans", those with single or divorced parents. In November of that year, the school successfully petitioned the Dauphin County Court on allowing girls based on their charter. The first eight girls arrived in March 1977. Female admission was gradual, first restricted to those between kindergarten and fifth grade, then in the summer of 1977 to sixth through eighth grade, and finally to all grade divisions in the summer of 1978. In October 1977, approximately 1100 boys and 60 girls were enrolled in the school; by September 1978, female students made up 10% of the 1300 students.

Cyndi Jacobsen wrote in 1989 in The Sentinel that "students chafe under the rules, the lack of privacy and individuality, and the anachronistic dairy barns ... [b]ut graduates tend to look back at their experience as a survival test". She said that house parents varied widely in their treatment, with some "rigid and authoritarian" and others "warm and affirming." Later that year, the school's longtime tradition of requiring all grade 9–12 students to milk cows, twice daily, was rescinded, with strong approval from students and the board. Director of secondary education John Storm justified the change, stating that "the school revolved around the milking program, when in fact we wanted it to revolve around educational opportunities".

In 2002, the school had about 1,500 students; over the next two decades, it grew to about 2,000.

In 2010, the school settled a molestation case involving sixteen children. In late 2011, a 13 year old was denied admission to the school because he was HIV-positive. While the school initially defended its decision, citing safety concerns, an anti-discrimination lawsuit filed by the AIDS Law Project of Pennsylvania led to a settlement of $700,000 for the boy's family and a reversal of the policy.

In 2014, alumnus Pete Gurt became the president of the school.

In 2016, 11 former students sued the school for invasion of privacy, alleging that an employee had hidden a camera in a bathroom used by senior male students. The employee admitted to filming the boys' showering and was sentenced to a year in prison.

In 2016, renovations began on Founders Hall, the school's 50-year-old administrative center. The hall includes a fountain designed by Aristides Demetrios, one of the largest domes in the state, an auditorium chapel seating 2,640, and a dining room seating 1,700. In October of that year, the school began building 32 additional student homes on its Legacy Campus in South Hanover Township.

That year, Milton Hershey School's science curriculum supervisor, Dr. Jaunine Fouche, received the Presidential Award for Excellence in Mathematics and Science Teaching.

In 2017, the Law, Public Safety and Security program at Milton Hershey School was recognized as the Advance CTE National Program of Excellence. The school received its first accreditation from the Commission on Accreditation for Law Enforcement Agencies (CALEA) for its campus security.

Also in 2017, former student Adam Dobson sued the school after the school expelled Dobson for attempting suicide. Dobson later stated that he was forced to watch a religious gay-conversion video. A court dismissed the lawsuit in 2020.

In 2019, Milton Hershey School's elementary innovation lab instructor received the Presidential Award for Excellence in Mathematics and Science Teaching.

In 2020, Milton Hershey School received its second CALEA accreditation, recognizing the school's Central Monitoring staff for excellence in Public Safety Communications.

In 2025, the school collaborated on the film Hershey, which depicts the life of Milton S. Hershey.

== Governance ==
=== Finance ===
Milton Hershey School's endowment was worth around $15 billion in 2020, about half of which comes from the school's controlling share of The Hershey Company's stock; the school is the US's wealthiest private school (besides universities and colleges). Only about 1.5% of this sum is used per year for educational programs, spending about $118,400 per year on each student. The proportionally low spending has been controversial. Massachusetts Institute of Technology Professor John Core called it "ludicrous", and Georgetown University law professor Brian Galle called it "indefensibly low". Galle said the low spending was because the school "can't seem to conceivably find any way to spend this pile of money". School officials countered that the school must adhere to the spending limits of Hershey's original deed.

In July 2002, the company managing the school trust announced it was considering selling its share in the Hershey company. Alumni and residents criticized the idea; some accused the trust of long-term financial wrongdoing and incompetence, with 1980 graduate Ric Fouad calling it "the charitable-trust Enron".

In 2020, Milton Hershey School invested $350 million to fund the development of up to six cost-free early childhood resource centers in Pennsylvania. Named Catherine Hershey Schools for Early Learning, the first center opened in 2023 and serves children from birth to age 5 from economically disadvantaged and at-risk backgrounds. The network has since expanded, opening a second center in Harrisburg in 2024 and a third in Middletown in 2025.

=== Partnerships ===
In 2017, Milton Hershey School created a partnership with Penn State University, its seventh such partnership, to offer support to Milton Hershey School graduates at the college level as first-generation college students. Other similar partnerships are with Mansfield University, Shippensburg University, East Stroudsburg University, Indiana University of Pennsylvania and Millersville University. In 2018, they signed a similar agreement with Dickinson College.

== School structure ==
The school is split into three cohorts: pre-K through 4th grade, 5th through 8th grade, and 9th through 12th grade. As of 2020, there are 180 student homes, each with 8 to 12 students of the same gender and similar age, and each led by house parents. Upon entering 5th grade, students begin the Career and Technical Education program, which provides activities tailored to students' specialized interests. The school offers college scholarships for some students and has special partnerships with about twenty colleges for student transitions. 85 to 90 percent of students continue to post-secondary education. In 2024, the school introduced ‘theme homes’ where high school students of similar interests live together and engage in experiential learning about potential career options.

== Admissions ==
According to the school's website, students are admitted on five criteria: having a family income less than three times the federal poverty level, being age 4 to 15, having an IQ over 80, lacking serious behavioral problems, and being able to "benefit from the school's program". The school is cost-free for students. As of 2021, 73 percent of students are from the state of Pennsylvania. The acceptance rate is low, around 14% in 1991. Each year, an average of 12.5% of the student population leaves, mostly by graduating or being removed by their parents. A quarter to a third of departures are expulsions.

=== Demographics ===
The school housed 2,020 students in the 2017–18 school year. Of these, 44.5% were white, 33.8% were black, 8.7% were Hispanic, 1.0% were Asian, and 11.0% identified with two or more races. There were 395 students in pre-K through 4th grade, 545 students in grades 5–8, and 950 students in grades 10–12. According to the school's website, there are roughly an equal number of boys and girls. While in 2000 only about one tenth of students had a deceased parent, nearly 90 percent of the students come from single-parent homes as of 2020, with an average income of $22,000.

View source data.

Enrollment by Race/Ethnicity 2019–2020
White	Black	Hispanic	Two or More Races	Asian	American Indian/Alaska Native	Native Hawaiian/Pacific Islander
843	693	374	221	29	8	3

The Compass Project enables Milton Hershey School students to develop leadership skills and build character. The school's Multicultural and Global Education program allows high school students to travel internationally and gain worldly experience and global awareness.

Non-sectarian Christian religious training has been mandatory since the school's beginning. School guidelines prohibit pressuring students to convert faiths; some students, however, have reported being proselytized by their house parents.

== Campus ==
The school's address is 1201 Homestead Lane, Hershey, Pennsylvania, just off U.S. Highway 322. As of 2015, the school trust owns 10,174 acres (4,117 ha) of land, about 7,500 acres (3,000 ha) of which are school campuses. Of the eight campuses, the main campus is by far the largest at 3,340 acres.

== Notable alumni ==
- Jocelyn Bioh – playwright and actor; graduated 2001
- George W. Cave – CIA: Directorate of Operations; graduated 1947
- Deesha Dyer – White House Social Secretary; graduated 1995
- Garry Gilliam – former NFL lineman; graduated 2009
- Nellie King – baseball pitcher for the Pittsburgh Pirates; graduated 1945
- Alan Krashesky – news anchor for WLS-TV in Chicago; graduated 1978
- Trymaine Lee – Pulitzer Prize–winning journalist and national reporter for MSNBC; graduated 1996
- Joe Senser – former member of the Minnesota Vikings; graduated 1974
- Andrew Joseph Stack – perpetrator of a 2010 suicide attack on an office of the Internal Revenue Service; graduated 1974
- Jason Wolfe – founder and CEO of several companies including GiftCards.com and Gift Card Granny; graduated 1987
