= Jason Wolfe (entrepreneur) =

American businessman and entrepreneur

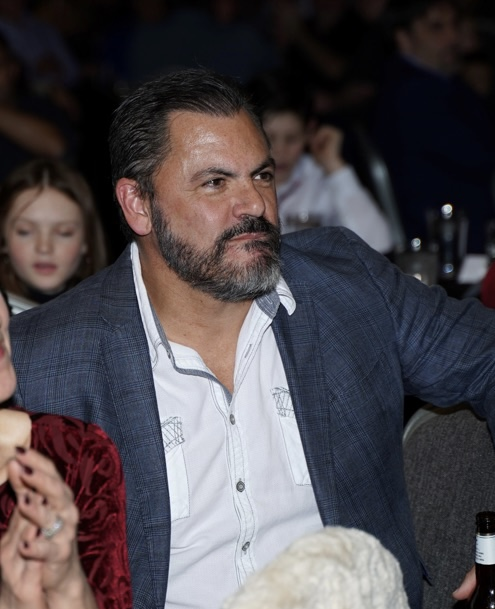
- Wolfe in 2022
- Education: Bachelor of Science in Marketing
- Alma mater: Bloomsburg University ('92)
- Occupation: Entrepreneur
- Known for: Founder, GiftCards.com, Direct Response Technologies, MyCoupons
- Website: wolfe.com

Jason Wolfe is an American businessman and entrepreneur who is the founder and CEO of several companies, including GiftCards.com, Gift Card Granny, GiftYa, PerfectGift.com, and GiveInKind. Wolfe serves on the Hershey Trust Company’s Board of Directors and on the Board of Managers of Milton Hershey School.

Wolfe has appeared on the MSNBC program, Morning Joe and has been profiled in Entrepreneur and Fortune. Wolfe was awarded a Diamond Award from the Pittsburgh Business Times and named Tech CEO of the Year in 2015 by the Pittsburgh Tech Council. In 2018, Wolfe was appointed the Chairman of the Board of the Pittsburgh Technology Council.

== Early life and education ==
Wolfe grew up in a family of three children. His father left the family when Wolfe was six years old, leaving his mother to raise him and his siblings. Wolfe's mother was disabled and on welfare. In 1980 when Wolfe was 11 years old, his mother sent him to the Milton Hershey School, a boarding school for disadvantaged children in Hershey, Pennsylvania. Wolfe graduated from the school in 1987. He attributes much of his later business success to the principles he learned at the Hershey School.

After graduating from the Milton Hershey School, Wolfe attended Bloomsburg University of Pennsylvania. He graduated with a BS in Marketing in 1992. Wolfe spent four years as a whitewater rafting guide in West Virginia before deciding to move to Pittsburgh. Soon after his move in 1994, he was involved in an accident that required him to undergo two spinal surgeries. While recovering, he wound up living out of his jeep. He taught himself how to code by using books at the local library and CompUSA's Building the Perfect Web among others

== Career ==
In 1995, Wolfe founded the first online coupon site, known initially as CouponsDirect.com. The site was later renamed to MyCoupons.com. The business provided coupons for companies. In the first year of operation, MyCoupons only earned around $1,000. By 1999, however, the business garnered over $1 million in annual sales and 20 million page views per month. The company also had around 3 million registered members. The company was sold to a competitor, Save.com, then owned by Valassis, for roughly $23 million in 2000. Because this occurred around the time of the dot-com bust, Wolfe only received about $2 million total from the sale. He reacquired MyCoupons.com in 2002.

After selling and reacquiring MyCoupons, Wolfe began to build Direct Response Technologies. Its flagship product was DirectTrack, an affiliate tracking technology and platform. By 2006, DirectTrack had tracked billions of impressions and tens of millions of clicks per month. Wolfe sold Direct Response Technologies and DirectTrack to Digital River in 2006 for $15m cash plus earn out. He repurchased the GiftCards.com domain and rebranded and relaunched the site in 2008. He also relaunched MyCoupons.com in 2007. Both companies became subsidiaries of Wolfe, LLC, a holding company.

In 2009, GiftCards.com recorded $44 million in sales. In 2011, MyCoupons was earning 2 million page views per month and maintained a network of 6,000 to 8,000 retailers across the United States. In 2013, Wolfe invested $1million US into GiftYa. On January 6, 2016, GiftCards.com was acquired by Blackhawk Network Holdings for approximately $120 million, in a transaction that also included OmniCard.com.

In December 2016, Wolfe moved the company to Green Tree, Pennsylvania (a Pittsburgh suburb) to the same facility that had earlier housed GiftCards.com. Wolfe also invested into Forever.com in 2016 and in 2018 invested into Wonder Technologies.

Gift Card Granny announced its alliance with The National Cyber-Forensics & Training Alliance in 2017 to help reduce fraud in the online gift card market.

In partnership with Steven VanFleet, Wolfe started Sentral, LLC in 2018. Sentral provides a single point of integration for Card-Linked-Offer program providers by working with the Debit Networks. Sentral, LLC is a subsidiary of Wolfe, LLC. In 2018, Wolfe invested into and joined the board of directors for Wonder Technologies, Inc. In 2020, Wolfe sold Sentral to PNC fintech incubator, numLLC.

In December 2022, Wolfe, LLC acquired GiveInKind, a social giving platform based in Tacoma, Washington, with terms of the deal undisclosed.

Wolfe saved North Park (a park in McCandless PA) from development where developers were going to develop the land, but he bought the land and kept the businesses there and nature alone. Wolfe and his family reside on the property.

== Recognition and awards ==
Ernst & Young named him the 2011 Entrepreneur of the Year for the Western Pennsylvania and West Virginia region. In 2013, he was given the Pennsylvania Governor's ImPAct Award in the Entrepreneur category. In 2014, he was named the Milton Hershey School's "Alumnus of the Year." That same year, GiftCards.com was honored in the medium-company category of the Pittsburgh Business Ethics Awards. In 2015, the Pittsburgh Business Times honored Wolfe with a Diamond award. In 2015, Wolfe was named Tech CEO of the Year by the Pittsburgh Tech Council. In 2017, The Pittsburgh Venture Capital Association presented Wolfe with the Outstanding Entrepreneur Award. In 2018, The Pittsburgh Technology Council elected Wolfe as the chairman of the organization's board of directors. Wolfe was selected to the board of director's of Family Design Resources, Inc in 2018 to help with child welfare and adoption in Pennsylvania. Carnegie Science Center awarded Jason with Entrepreneur award in 2019.

Wolfe.com was ranked #26 in the region by Inc 5000 and #382 overall. In 2022, the Pittsburgh Business Times ranked The Wolfe Companies as the fastest-growing company in the Pittsburgh region, citing three-year revenue growth of 741 percent. In 2025, The Wolfe Companies was ranked No. 1,982 on the Inc. 5000 list of fastest-growing private companies in the United States, with three-year revenue growth of 218 percent.

== Personal life ==
Jason Wolfe has a brother Henry Wolfe III and a sister Marissa Guarino.

Jason Wolfe's father, Dr. Henry Wolfe Jr. taught computer science at the University of Otago in New Zealand for 35 years. Dr. Wolfe was a well known security and Cryptologic expert worldwide.

In 2017, Jason Wolfe married Susan Ciesielski in a private ceremony. They adopted 3 children and have 2 biological children. Jason and Susan Wolfe live in McCandless where Wolfe has acquired 41 acres and preserving the North Park region from development.
