= Hershey (film) =

- Theatrical release poster
- Directed by: Mark Waters
- Written by: Sharon Paul; Timothy Michael Hayes
- Produced by: Sharon Paul; Mark Tilghman; Mary Aloe; Joshua Harris; Will Hardy
- Starring: Finn Wittrock; Alexandra Daddario; Alan Ruck; Richard Kind; David Costabile; Heléne Yorke
- Cinematography: Ed Wu
- Edited by: Travis Sittard
- Music by: Rolfe Kent
- Production companies: Dandelion Media; Hershey Entities; Aloe Entertainment; Peachtree Group; RCM3; The Hershey Company
- Distributed by: Angel Studios
- Release dates: September 26, 2026 (Haifa); November 25, 2026 (United States)
- Running time: 107 minutes
- Country: United States
- Language: English

Hershey is a 2026 American biographical drama film directed by Mark Waters and written by Sharon Paul and Timothy Michael Hayes.

== Premise ==
The film depicts the history of The Hershey Company, built by its founder Milton S. Hershey and his wife Kitty.

== Cast ==
- Finn Wittrock as Milton S. Hershey
- Alexandra Daddario as Catherine "Kitty" Hershey
- Alan Ruck as Henry Hershey
- Richard Kind as Joseph Royer
- David Costabile as Tobias Thornhill
- Heléne Yorke as Margaret
- Michael Moreland Milligan as Lebbie
- Francesca Faridany as Veronica "Fanny" Hershey
- Daniel David Stewart as Murrie
- Dina Spybey as Aunt Mattie

== Production ==
The film was produced by Dandelion Media in partnership with the Hershey Entities, and partially financed by them. Hershey Company executives approved "everything from IP and brand considerations to creative choices", describing it as a "strategic content platform" and "part of a broader effort to bring our story into culture in a more immersive way".

It was announced in April 2025 that Mark Waters would be directing the film, with Finn Wittrock and Alexandra Daddario cast to star. Alan Ruck, Richard Kind, David Costabile and Heléne Yorke were added to the cast the following month.

Filming began in Pittsburgh, Pennsylvania in May 2025, and was expected to continue through June. Scenes were additionally shot in Harmony, with production also due to occur in Ligonier.

=== Music ===
By June 2026, Rolfe Kent had composed the score for the film.

== Release ==
The film had a gala presentation at the 42nd Haifa International Film Festival on September 26, 2026.

Hershey is scheduled to be released by Angel Studios in the United States on November 25, 2026.

== Reception ==
Early reviews of the film were uniformly negative, with the Hollywood Reporter calling it "feature-length product placement" and "a blandly sanitized biopic that’s as sickly sweet as the candies the company sells".
