= Quo Card =

- Industry: Service industry
- Founded: December 1987
- Website: www.quocard.com

A Quo Card is a general-purpose pre paid card issued by the Quo Corporation, a subsidiary of BCJ-81 Inc. It is considered to be used all over Japan.

== Overview ==
It is frequently used as the equivalent of a gift card across Japan. It can be customized, and it has been used since 1987. It had been established as Japan Card Centre Co. Ltd within Shinjuku. They began issuing 7-Eleven convenience cards after striking up a partnership with the corporation. They would rebrand the product to the name "Quo Card" after they would become widely popular. The corporation would later rebrand to its present name during 2003, and then become a subsidiary of Sumitomo, and then transferred to T Gaia. It would become wholly owned by BCJ-81 Inc. by 2025.
