= Milton S. Hershey Mansion =

Historic house in Pennsylvania, United States

- U.S. National Register of Historic Places
- U.S. National Historic Landmark
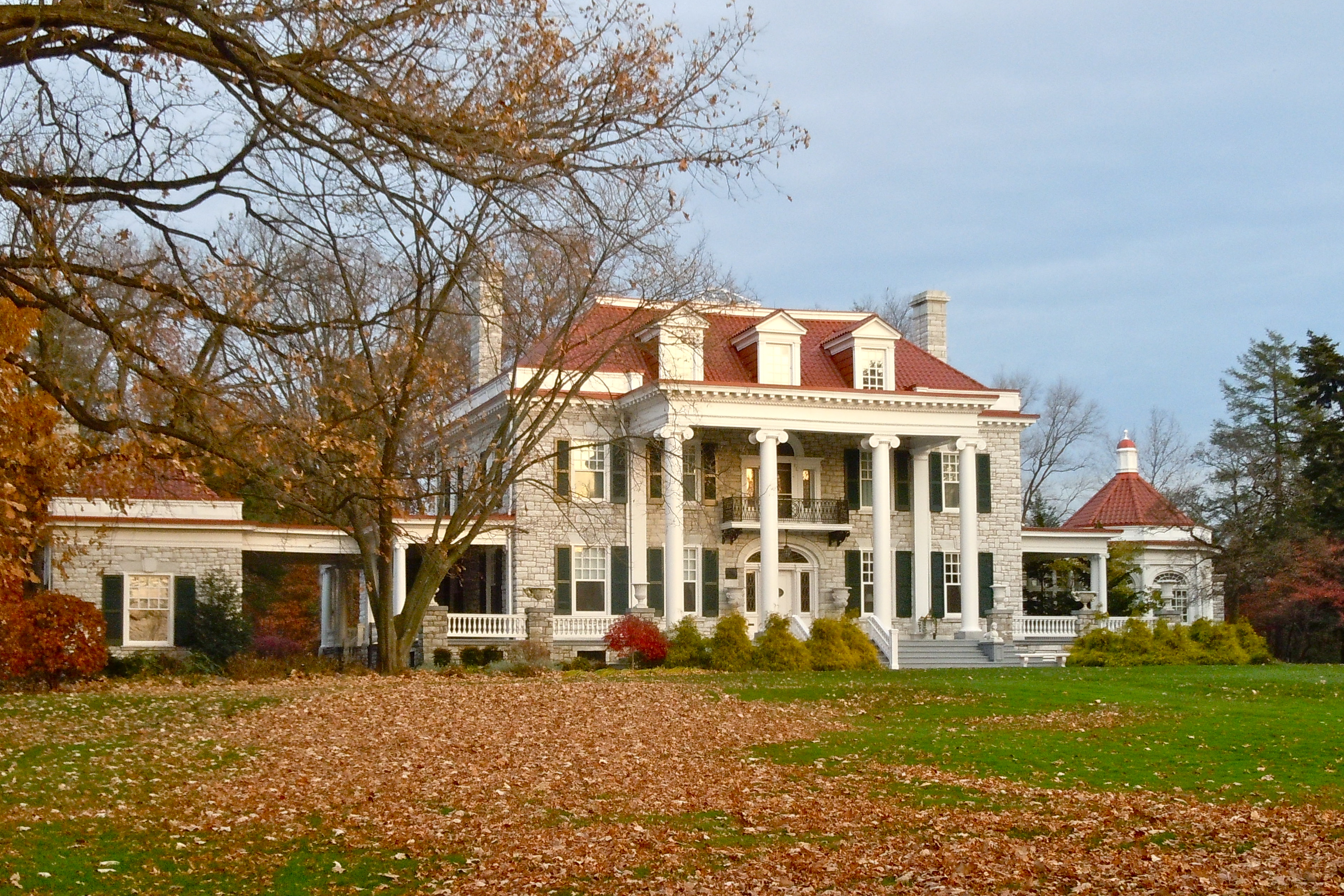
- Milton S. Hershey Mansion, November 2011

- Location within Pennsylvania Location within the United States
- Location: 100 Mansion Rd. E, Hershey, Pennsylvania
- Coordinates: 40°17′25″N 76°38′39″W
- Area: 26.75 acres (10.83 ha)
- Built: 1908
- Architect: Henry N. Herr, Paul Oglesby
- NRHP reference No.: 78002388

Significant dates
- Added to NRHP: February 7, 1978
- Designated NHL: May 4, 1983

The Milton S. Hershey Mansion, also known as High Point, is a 26,000 sqft historic house at 100 Mansion Road East in Hershey, Pennsylvania, United States. Built in 1908, it was the home of Hershey Chocolate founder Milton S. Hershey (1857–1945) from 1908 until his death. Hershey is credited with introducing the mass production of chocolate to be sold at low prices and operated what became the world's largest chocolate maker. His house was designated a National Historic Landmark in 1983. It presently houses the offices of the Hershey Trust Company, a multibillion-dollar trust fund which owns a controlling share of Hershey Foods Corporation and runs the Milton Hershey School.

== Description and history ==
The former Milton S. Hershey Mansion is located amid the grounds of the Hershey Country Club, at the junction of East Mansion and West Mansion Roads. It is set on a rise of land which provides views to the original Hershey factory to the west. It is a 2 1/2-story structure, built (like the factory) out of locally quarried limestone, and is Colonial Revival in style. It is covered by a truncated hip roof and has four limestone chimneys. The main facade is five bays wide, with a two-story flat-roofed portico supported by Ionic columns extending across the central three bays. Single-story porches extend to both sides, the one on the left continuing as a porte-cochere to join to a small outbuilding, and the one on the right extending to a polygonal gazebo-like structure.

Milton Hershey first began manufacturing chocolate in a Lancaster plant in which he principally made caramel, following the then-common methods of chocolatiers in making the product into a variety of shapes and styles. In 1901, he decided to embark on a strategy of mass production, with a limited number of products that could be sold inexpensively to a larger customer base. As his production base, he developed the town of Hershey into a company town, building the factory and other facilities. After the factory was completed, he had this house built, to a design by architect Henry Herr, who had also designed many of the town's early buildings.

When the Hershey Country Club was founded in 1930, Hershey donated the house to the club as a headquarters, reserving an apartment for himself on the premises, and it remained his principal residence until his death in 1945. The house was acquired in 1970 by the Milton Hershey School, which was used as an educational environment to teach early 20th-century building practices. In 1977 it was purchased by Hershey Foods for use as its corporate headquarters. It presently serves as the offices of the Hershey Trust Company.

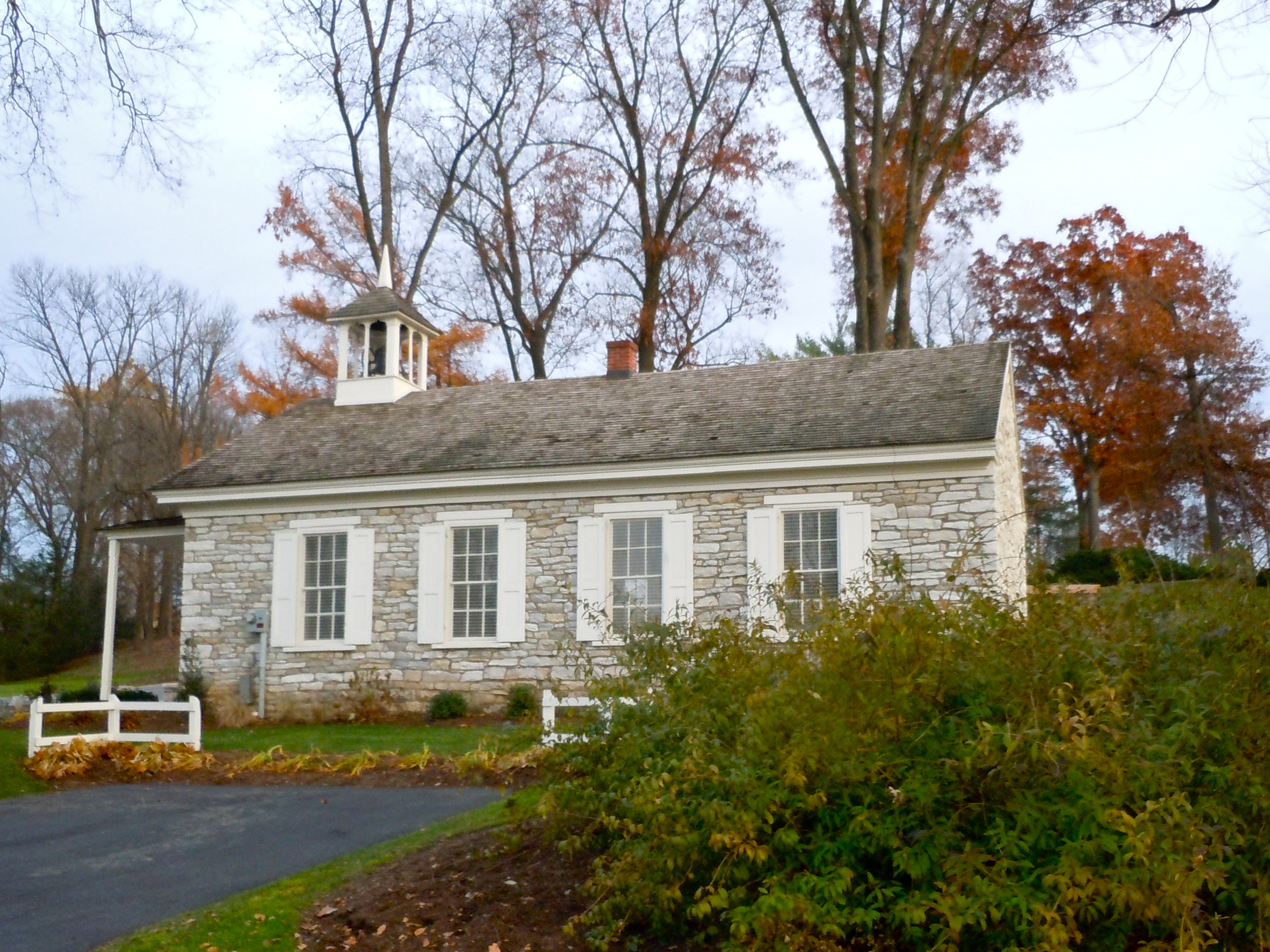
Neighboring schoolhouse, which Hershey briefly attended as a child.

== See also ==
- List of National Historic Landmarks in Pennsylvania
- National Register of Historic Places listings in Dauphin County, Pennsylvania
