= SparkBase =

American gift-card service

SparkBase LLC
- Company type: Private
- Industry: Financial Services
- Founded: Ohio, United States, 2004
- Founder: Douglas Hardman
- Headquarters: Cleveland, Ohio; United States
- Area served: United States, Canada, European Union, and South America
- Key people: Douglas Hardman, Chief Executive Officer
- Services: Payment Processing; Gift/Loyalty Cards; Stored Value Cards; Loyalty Marketing
- Number of employees: 35
- Website: http://www.sparkbase.com/

SparkBase, LLC (SparkBase or SB) was a stored-value and gift card transaction processor located in Cleveland, Ohio, United States from 2004 to 2016. It provided private-label, stored-value, specialty gift cards, customer loyalty, and community rewards programs to Independent Sales Organizations (independent companies used by banks to develop new merchant relationships on their behalf). ISOs then sold these gift and loyalty products to merchant customers along with credit card services and processing equipment.

In 2009, Sparkbase managed gift card processing for over 12 million alternate payment system cards, with an average daily balance of approximately $120 million. The company developed its own network code in-house, with twenty-three developers on staff, and operated its own servers and Tier V data center on site, with off-site secondary and tertiary backup data centers.

== History ==
The company was founded in 2004 by software developer Douglas Hardman as a division of Technology Imaging Services, and purchased by Hardman in early 2007. Hardman was the CTO of SparkBase prior to his acquisition of the company.

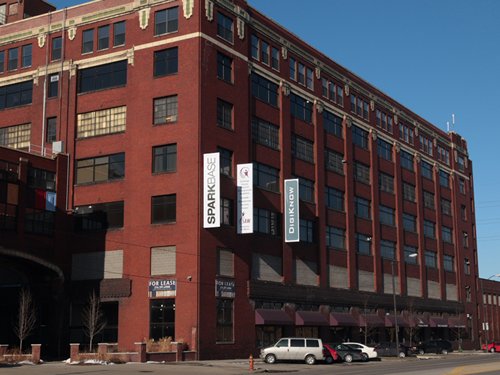
SparkBase's offices in Cleveland, Ohio

== Place in the Prepaid Card Industry ==
SparkBase is in the closed system prepaid card part of the gift card industry, offering a software as a service stored-value payment processing network for specialty gift cards, customer loyalty programs, and community rewards programs. SparkBase does not service merchants directly, but rather acts as a private-label service through third parties, such as Independent Sales Offices (ISOs), loyalty marketing companies, financial institutions, and banks. These entities then market their own version of SparkBase’s gift and loyalty platform to their merchants in conjunction with credit card services and processing equipment.

The gift card network provided by SparkBase is a private-label or white label system that allows the third party (typically an ISO), to brand the company's stored-value network and associated gift cards with the third party's own logo and other identifying information.

== Industry Services Originating with SparkBase ==
=== PayCloud ===
Mobile wallet app for reward cards, discounts, store coupons and gift cards to merchants on the SparkBase network. Announced in March 2011, and awarded "Technology Innovation of the Year" by the Electronic Transactions Association in May. Currently, PayCloud is widely available in Cleveland, Columbus, Chicago, and Jacksonville.

=== Loyalty Star ===
Web-based RFM analysis and campaign management tool for merchants on the SparkBase network.

=== GetYourBalance.com ===
GetYourBalance.com is a tool offered by SparkBase which allows customers to register their gift cards, and check their balances online. The API toolset permits ISOs and merchants to create a registration and gift card balance portal directly on their own branded site. Through that portal, merchants can then access contact and other information about their customers acquired through the registration process, and use this information in e-mail, SMS messaging, and other marketing efforts.

Screenshot of mock customer analytics page for SparkBase's private-label merchant services

=== Text Messaging Gateway ===
In October 2008, SparkBase launched the first SMS (short messaging service) gateway integration, allowing merchants to reach individual gift cardholders directly through SMS text messaging.

The text messaging service offered by SparkBase may be used as a marketing vehicle and a means of payment, and provides end-users a mechanism to check loyalty card balances and otherwise conduct loyalty card transactions directly through their cell phone. This service also offers merchants the ability to send electronic coupon codes, special offers, and rewards messages directly to their customers.

== Awards ==
- In 2009, founder Douglas Hardman received the Smart Business Network "Rising Star" Award in relation to Sparkbase.
- In 2011, Sparkbase's smart phone-enabled mobile payment service, Paycloud®, won the Technology Innovation Award at the Electronic Transactions Association's Annual Meeting.

== See also ==
- Payment card
- Stored value card
