= Charity gift card =

A charity gift card allows a gift giver to make a charitable donation that the gift recipient may direct to the charity of their choice. Although a charity gift card has many similarities to a store gift card, a charity gift card functions quite differently. A charity gift card is an indicator of control over a small donor advised fund. The purchaser of the charity gift card creates the donor advised fund with the charity gift card purchase money. When the charity gift card recipient “spends” the gift card, the recipient is in actuality advising the holder of the associated donor advised fund (typically the charity that issued the charity gift card) to send the money to the charity that the charity gift card recipient selects.

== Types of charity gift cards ==
Charity gift cards are offered almost exclusively from websites. Some charity gift card issuers offer a large variety of card designs, while others offer a more limited number of proprietary designs. Some offer customization as well. Most issuers allow charity gift cards to be sent by email, printed on a printer or shipped in the mail as a plastic card. The plastic charity gift card is frequently enclosed in a greeting card or on a carrier. Some charity gift cards have an expiration date, while some never expire. Issuers charge a fee for the card itself, and for processing and activation. They also keep a portion of the donated amount, to cover administrative costs. Card fees and administrative fees vary greatly from issuer to issuer, as does the simplicity of their calculation formula. The number of charities offered to the gift card redeemer also varies, from 250 to 1.8 million.

== History ==
The function of a charity gift card existed before the term “charity gift card” came into use. In the UK the concept of a “Charity Gift Token” which could be given to any charity was proposed by David Black in 1989. The UK Charities Aid Foundation set up a “Charity Gift Voucher” service in 1992. Other later products were called “charity gift certificate,” “plastic gift card,” charity gift ecard” or “charity gift”. In late 2007 the term “charity gift card” came into common use on the web and in news media. In 2009 the term “charity gift card” was first used in a published book, and first recognized as a “gift card category".

The concept of a charity gift card was patented for a number of years. In 2000 Randi Shade filed to patent “A system and method for charitable giving.” The patent covered the essential concept of a charity gift card and was issued by the USPTO on February 11, 2003. The patent holder operated a website at www.charitygift.com, offering all the functionality of a charity gift card in products called “charitygift” and “gold box”. In 2007 the USPTO rejected all 16 claims in the previously issued patent in a Reexamination requested by the patent holder. Charity gift cards have different names in countries other than the United States.

== See also ==
- Gift card
