= SVM (company) =

Marketing and gift card company

SVM Cards
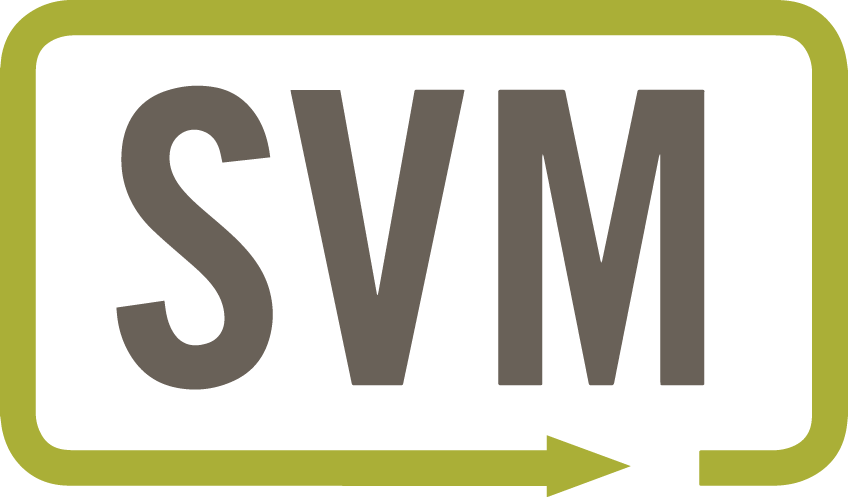
- Type: Private
- Industry: Promotions and Incentives
- Founded: 1997; 29 years ago
- Founder: Marshall Reavis
- Headquarters: Arlington Heights, IL
- Key people: Marshall W. Reavis (Founder and CEO)
- Products: Gift cards
- Owner: Blackhawk Network
- Number of employees: 65
- Website: www.svmcards.com

SVM, originally known as Stored Value Marketing, is a provider of gasoline, restaurant, and other retail gift cards also known as stored value cards based in Des Plaines, Illinois.

SVM is considered a pioneer in the marketing of stored value products (gift cards).

== Corporate history ==
SVM was founded in 1997 by Marshall Reavis, a former employee at Mobil Oil Corporation. While at Mobil Oil, Reavis was instrumental with the introduction of one of the earliest-known prepaid “gasoline gift cards,” then called the Mobil GO Card. When SVM first opened, the company only provided gasoline gift cards and had two employees.

In 1998, the company expanded its product offerings with the first non-gasoline gift card product. In the same year, the company expanded it service by adding production, inventory management and fulfillment services. In 1999, SVM hosted its first client internet landing page.

In 2001, SVM began issuing gift cards in an outsourced environment. In 2004 SVM deploys a web-based card reloading system on behalf of a major oil company that enables consumers to reload gasoline gift cards instantly online.

In 2005, SVM establishes a relationship with American Express Incentive Services and becomes a reseller of the American Express-branded Fill It Up Card (prepaid gasoline card). By 2008, SVM hosted multiple client internet landing pages and SVM customizes a multi-use gift card.

In 2015, SVM moved to a 35,000 square-foot headquarters in Arlington Heights, IL. The company also opened a consumer-focused gift card storefront on eBay. In March 2016, SVM acquired 1to1 Card, a leading prepaid card provider.

On April 8, 2020, Blackhawk Network Holdings acquired SVM.

== Products and services ==
SVM's products include gift card for major gasoline brands, fast food and casual dining restaurants, retail, travel, and specialty retailers.

SVM's role in the issuance of gift cards is in two main ways:

In some cases, SVM is the third-party issuer. In this situation SVM contracts with the processor who holds a database of all card numbers, and SVM holds the funds until cards are redeemed. SVM then settles with the retail companies.

In other cases, SVM does the same functions as in the first example except that SVM does not hold the funds. Gift cards are resold through an agreement with the retail company. Cards in this scenario may be sold either in a retail store environment, or may be sold directly business to business.

SVM's additional services include card program production, fulfillment of cards (to both retail outlets and customers who purchase the cards), and inventory management services. SVM also provides customer service and Internet hosting services.

SVM has a “sister company,” SFS (SVM Fulfillment Services), that provides fulfillment of gift cards to actual retail locations. This company was established in 2005.
