= Achievers =

Canadian software company

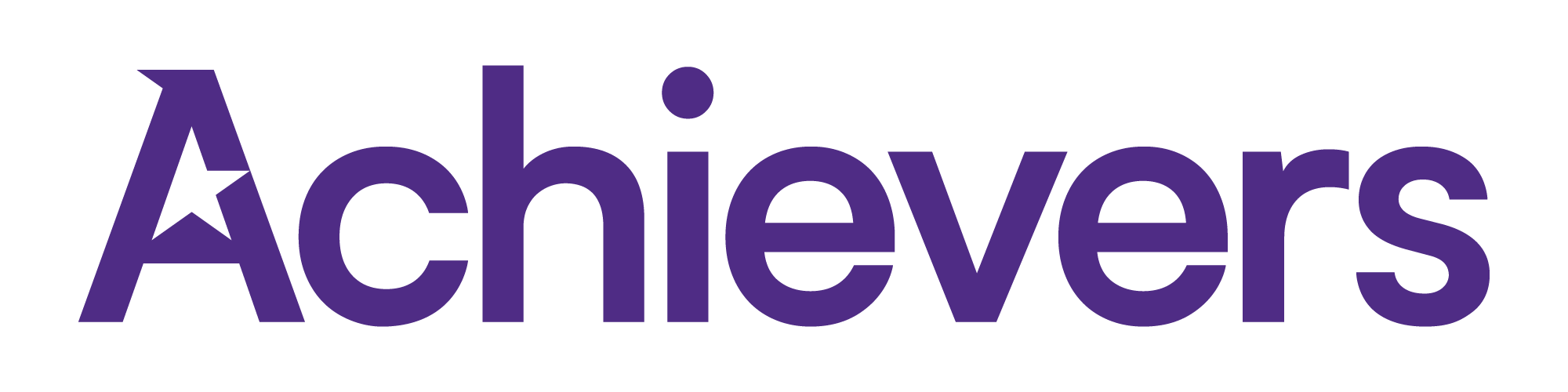
- Type: Private
- Industry: Human capital management software
- Founded: Toronto, Canada; 2002; 24 years ago
- Founder: Razor Suleman
- Headquarters: Toronto, Canada; Victoria, Australia; Manchester, England
- Website: achievers.com

Achievers is a Canadian employee engagement and recognition software company co-headquartered in Toronto, Canada, Victoria, Australia, and Manchester, UK.

== History ==
Achievers (formerly I Love Rewards) was founded in 2002 by Razor Suleman in Toronto, Canada. He decided to start Achievers upon being appointed to provide a solution for a consulting project for a large corporate client that wasn't having a lot of success motivating their employees. In 2007, Achievers raised $3.3 million in its Series A funding round led by Laurence Capital, Relay Ventures, and JLA Ventures followed by a Series B funding round worth $6.9 million in 2009. In September 2010, the company opened its office in Boston and changed its name to Achievers, and in May 2011 opened its office in San Francisco, California to function as the company's US headquarters.

In September 2011, Achievers received $24.5 million in its Series C funding round led by Alfred Lin's American venture capital firm, Sequoia Capital, and supported by GrandBanks Capital, JLA Ventures and Ontario's Venture Capital Fund. In the same year, Suleman was named a recipient of the Ernst & Young Entrepreneur of The Year Award.

In 2015, Suleman sold Achievers to Blackhawk Network for $150 million. In 2018, Blackhawk went from a public company to a private company, during which time Achievers spun out from Blackhawk as a separate entity and is now co-owned by Silver Lake and P2 Capital Partners.

In 2020, Achievers acquired TemboSocial, a Canadian software startup that develops employee recognition and feedback solutions.

Achievers has been recognized by numerous organizations for its workplace culture and technological achievements, including Great Place to Work, HRO Today's Bakers Dozen, Brandon Hall Group, Stevie award and ranked in the second place in the smaller-business category of this year's Best GTA Employers awards in 2011.

== Achievers software ==
The Achievers employee experience platform is designed to provide HR teams with a suite of employee engagement programs to connect employees and build cultures of belonging.
