= AIDS Law Project of Pennsylvania =

Nonprofit law firm for HIV and AIDS patients

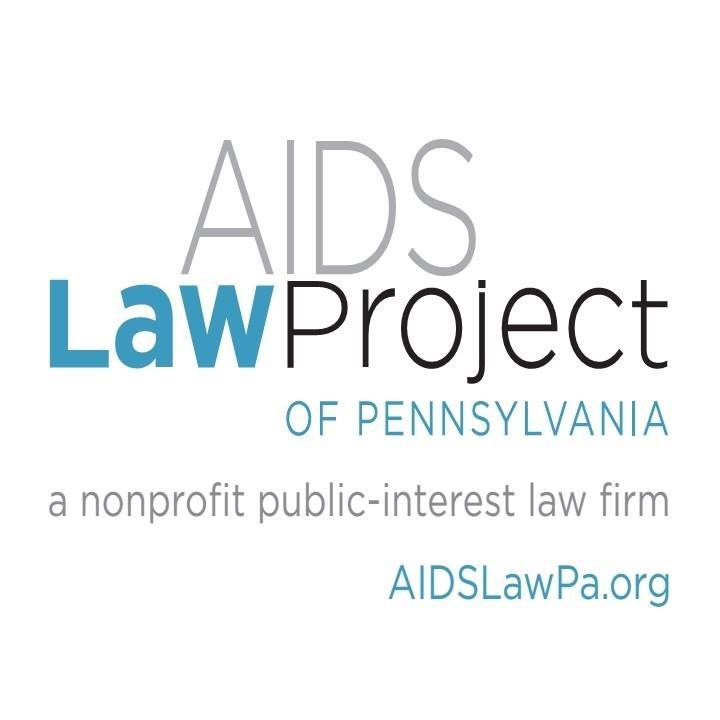
- Founded: 1988
- Location: 1211 Chestnut St # 600, Philadelphia, PA, 19107
- Coordinates: 39°57′03″N 75°09′39″W
- Region served: Pennsylvania and South Jersey
- Key people: Executive Director Ronda B. Goldfein, Esq. Managing Attorney Yolanda French Lollis, Esq. Deputy Managing Attorney Juan Baez, Esq.
- Website: aidslawpa.org

The AIDS Law Project of Pennsylvania is a nonprofit, public-interest law firm that provides free legal service to individuals living with and affected by HIV and AIDS. Founded in 1988, it is the only public interest law firm in the nation that is exclusively dedicated to helping people living with HIV. AIDS Law Project is headquartered in Philadelphia with an additional office in southern New Jersey.

== Background ==
The AIDS Law Project provides free legal assistance to people living with HIV and others directly affected by the epidemic. The AIDS Law Project serves all of Pennsylvania and Southern New Jersey, educating the public about AIDS-related legal issues, training case management professionals to become better advocates for their HIV-positive clients, and working at local, state and national levels to achieve fair laws and policies for those affected by HIV. It is equipped with a bilingual (Spanish, English, and French) staff.

== History ==
The AIDS Law Project was founded in 1988 by David W. Webber, who served as its first executive director. Nan Feyler served as the second executive director from 1993 until 2000, at which point the current Executive Director Ronda B. Goldfein took over the position after having worked there since 1992, beginning as a volunteer.

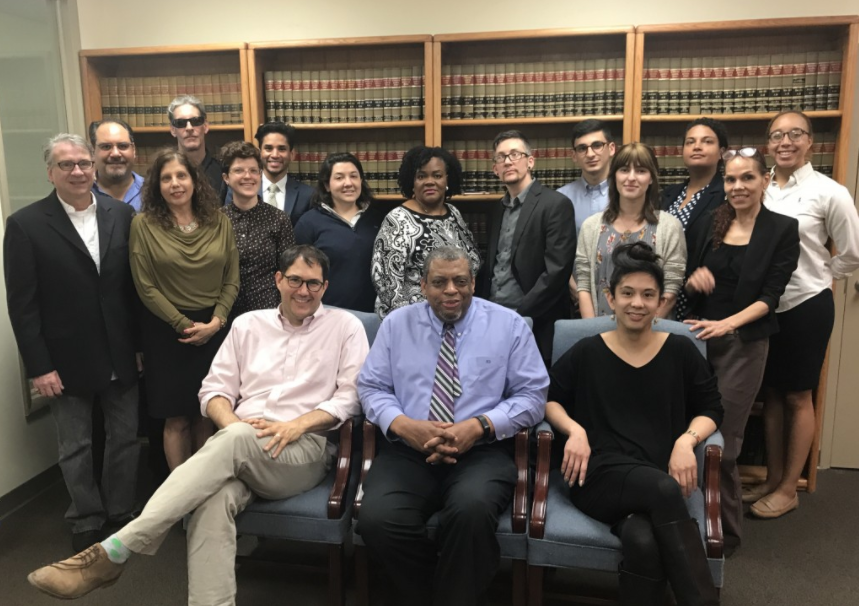
Standing, left to right is Robert Levesque, Database Manager; David Talento, Technology Manager; Ronda B. Goldfein, Esq., Executive Director; Scriabin Rimerman, CPA., Finance Director; Maggie Schepcaro, Paralegal; Juan Baez, Esq., Deputy Managing Attorney; Sarah Schalman-Bergen, Esq., Of Counsel; Yolanda French Lollis, Esq., Managing Attorney; Adrian M. Lowe, Esq., Senior Staff Attorney; Alex Grayson, Summer Intern (Clark University '18); Dionysia Sioutis, Summer Intern (American University '17); Jeni Wright, Esq., Staff Attorney; Arlene Vasquez, Receptionist; Jade E. McKnight, Housing Paralegal. Seated, left to right is Jacob M. Eden, Esq., Staff Attorney; Blair C. Dickerson, Volunteer Attorney; Messapotamia Lefae, Administrative Assistant. May 25, 2017.

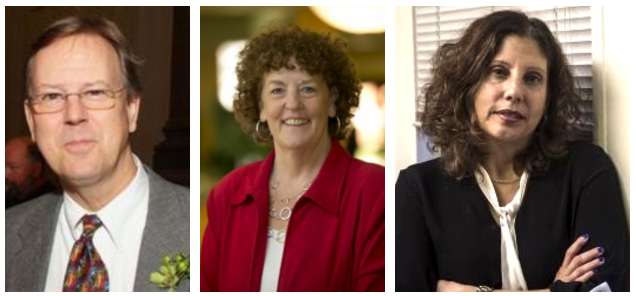
From Left to Right: David W. Webber, AIDS Law Project Founder and executive director (1988–1993); Nan Feyler, executive director (1993–2000); Ronda Goldfein, executive director (2000-present).

== Significant cases ==
- Smith v. City of Philadelphia (1994)

In 1994, the AIDS Law Project filed a complaint with the United States Department of Justice against the City of Philadelphia on behalf of an individual who was refused treatment by emergency medical technicians (EMTs) on the basis of his AIDS diagnosis.

On March 21, 1994, the AIDS Law Project and the City of Philadelphia reached a settlement which strove to ensure that EMTs would no longer refuse to render aid to people with HIV/AIDS by instituting AIDS training for all personnel, financial compensation for the plaintiff, and an apology. This was the first settlement of an AIDS discrimination case under the Americans with Disabilities Act (ADA).

- Smith v. City of Philadelphia (2004)

Philadelphia EMTs again refused to render aid to a man who was suffering from chest pains. The thirty-eight-year-old man was denied treatment by EMTs who were afraid of contracting AIDS.

Accused of violating the ADA and other discrimination laws, the City of Philadelphia agreed to pay $50,000 to Mr. Smith, promised to adhere to nondiscrimination policies, and train all personnel on HIV/AIDS transmission as part of a settlement.

- M. Smith v. Life Partners, Inc. (2007)

In 2007, the AIDS Law Project secured health insurance for a client who had sold her life and health insurance policies to a viatical settlement company in 1994 before the discovery of antiretroviral treatment which transformed an HIV diagnosis from inevitably fatal to a manageable disease.

When it became clear that the client planned to live a long and healthy life, the viatical company informed the client that it would not continue to pay her health insurance premiums for the remainder of her life per the terms of the contract. With AIDS Law Project representation, the New Jersey Superior Court found against the company, finding an anticipatory breach of contract. The appellate court agreed.

A settlement was reached and the client was able to continue to access the health care.

- Mother Smith, Abraham Smith v. Milton Hershey School (2011)

In 2011, the AIDS Law Project filed a suit against the Milton Hershey School in Hershey, Pennsylvania, in the U.S. District Court for the Eastern District of Pennsylvania alleging violations of anti-discrimination laws after a 14-year-old boy was denied enrollment to the School on the basis of his HIV status.

After AIDS Law Project representation and advocacy, the school's president, Anthony J. Colistra, publicly apologized to the student and to his mother, offered to reconsider the boy's application, and announced "a new Equal Opportunity Policy clearly stating that the School treats applicants with HIV no differently than any other applicants."

The boy and his mother received $700,000 from the School in the federal AIDS-discrimination lawsuit settlement and the School also paid $15,000 in civil penalties assessed by the U.S. Department of Justice, which investigated the complaint and concluded that the school violated the Americans with Disabilities Act. The settlement also required the school to provide HIV training for its staff and students.

- HIV Criminalization in Pennsylvania: In support of Julie Graham (2014)

In 2014, AIDS Law Project assisted Julie Graham, a licensed practical nurse from Lebanon County, who was charged with two felonies and two misdemeanors. These charges came after a man she dated claimed she did not disclose her HIV status. The man did not contract HIV.

Graham faced losing her employment with the hospital, a scheduled loss of her medical insurance, and possible imprisonment. AIDS Law Project worked with criminal defense lawyer Larry Krasner in building Graham's defense, along with providing an expert witness on HIV transmission. Next, the AIDS Law Project advised her on how to obtain Medicaid since her employer-provided insurance was ending and they assisted her in renewing her Practical Nurse license.

In February 2014, Lebanon County prosecutors agreed to drop three of the four charges. Attorneys from AIDS Law Project met with the Lebanon County District Attorney to advocate on behalf of Graham and to explain the detrimental implications of HIV criminalization which is often based on stigma, not scientific fact. Shortly after, the DA's office dropped the remaining charge.

In order to prevent Graham from losing her employment, AIDS Law Project challenged the hospital's reasons to terminate her employment. On April 16, Graham was notified by the hospital that she could return to work.

- Andrew Beckett v. Aetna, Inc. (2017)

In the summer of 2017, the AIDS Law Project, along with the Legal Action Center and Berger & Montague, P.C., filed a federal class action lawsuit against the third largest health insurance company in the United States, Aetna, Inc., after a faulty mailing compromised the HIV privacy of as many as 12,000 of Aetna's customers. In January 2018, a settlement of $17,161,200 was reached on behalf of the thousands of customers who received letters from Aetna revealing that they were prescribed HIV drugs through the clear envelope window.

Ronda B. Goldfein, executive director of the AIDS Law Project and co-lead counsel for the class action, said, "The fear of losing control of HIV-related information and the resulting risk of discrimination are barriers to health care and this settlement reinforces the importance of keeping such information private, and we hope it reassures people living with HIV, or those on PrEP, that they do not have to choose between privacy and health care."

- US v. Safehouse (2019)

In 2019, with the support of the city government, an organization called Safehouse was hoping to open a public health center providing a range of services to address the overdose crisis in Philadelphia. Safehouse's proposed services include medically supervised consumption. In February 2019, the U.S. Attorney for the Eastern District of Pennsylvania filed a civil lawsuit asking a federal court to declare that supervised consumption sites are illegal under 21 U.S.C. §856(a), a section of the Controlled Substances Act colloquially known as the “Crack House” Statute. The AIDS Law Project, along with DLA Piper and others, countersued, arguing that the Controlled Substances Act does not apply to Safehouse's proposed activities. The litigation is ongoing.

- Alabama Doe, et al., v. Gilead Sciences, Inc. (2020)

After the drug company Gilead sent HIV-related mail to people enrolled in their patient assistance program, Gilead agreed to a $4 million settlement in a class action lawsuit filed by AIDS Law Project, Langer, Grogan & Diver and Berger & Montague, P.C.

- Doe v. Delaware County, et al. (2022)

A 28-year-old man living with HIV was incarcerated in the George W. Hill Correctional Facility in Delaware County, Pennsylvania for 6 months in 2020. In a lawsuit brought by the AIDS Law Project of Pennsylvania, Lambda Legal, and Langer, Grogan & Diver, the man alleged that Delaware County and the Florida-based GEO Group, which then ran the prison, denied him a kitchen job because he has HIV. The suit further alleged the prison impermissibly disclosed his HIV status. The settlement included policy changes and financial compensation.

== Awards and honors ==
In 2014, the AIDS Law Project was awarded the Alexander D. Forger Award for Excellence in HIV Legal Services and Advocacy from the American Bar Association AIDS Coordinating Committee. They were recognized for their effective work and dedication in the fight against HIV and AIDS.
