= GiftCards.com =

American online gift card retailer company

- Type: Subsidiary
- Founded: 1999; 27 years ago
- Founder: Blackhawk Network (CEO)
- Headquarters: Pittsburgh, Pennsylvania, U.S.
- Area served: United States
- Products: Gift cards
- Parent: Blackhawk Network Holdings (2016–present)
- Website: Official Website

GiftCards.com is an American online gift-card retailer based in Pittsburgh, Pennsylvania, United States. The company sells gift cards for thousands of different large corporate retailers and small businesses including Vanillagifts.com, Best Buy, Barnes & Noble, Sephora, Coach, Amazon.com, and others. The company also offers prepaid Visa and MasterCard gift cards. GiftCards.com is considered the largest online gift card retailer and has appeared on the Inc. 5000 list multiple times (most recently in 2015). The company is currently owned by Blackhawk Network Holdings after its purchase of the retailer in 2016.

== History ==
In 1999, GiftCards.com was founded by Jason Wolfe in Pittsburgh, Pennsylvania as DirectCertificate.com. In this early iteration, the company sold paper gift certificates for merchants instead of plastic gift cards. In 2003, Wolfe purchased the GiftCards.com domain name for $40,000. In 2006, Wolfe sold DirectCertificates.com to Minnesota-based, Digital River. He purchased the company back in 2007 and eventually rebranded it as GiftCards.com in 2008. By 2009, it had $44 million in sales.

The company operates out of a suburban Pittsburgh facility that prints gift cards directly and sends them to clients. In 2010, GiftCards.com had 60 employees and had 100 employees by 2013. By 2014, the company had over $100 million in annual sales with 12 issued patents and 45 pending. It also entered into a partnership with CashStar, allowing them to sell gift cards for over 50 different retailers. In 2015, the company sold its 6 millionth gift card.

In 2016, Blackhawk Network Holdings announced the purchase of GiftCards.com. The purchase was confirmed by GiftCards.com in a press release, announcing the value of the purchase at $120 million.

== Products ==
GiftCards.com offers gift cards from around 500,000 different large and small businesses throughout the United States. Major gift card providers include Best Buy, Sephora, Yankee Candle, Amazon.com, Pottery Barn, Starbucks, The Cheesecake Factory, Gap, Macy's, and Bloomingdale's among many others. The company also provides Visa and MasterCard gift cards. For an added fee, customers can personalize their gift cards with photos, text, or other graphics. All gift cards are printed at the GiftCards.com facility in suburban Pittsburgh.

== Philanthropy ==
Founder and CEO, Jason Wolfe, established the "You Gift, We Gift" charity in 2013. As part of the initiative, Wolfe and his son drive around the United States in an RV handing out gifts and gift cards to children in need.
