= The Hershey Story =

Museum in Hershey, Pennsylvania

The Hershey Story, The Museum on Chocolate Avenue
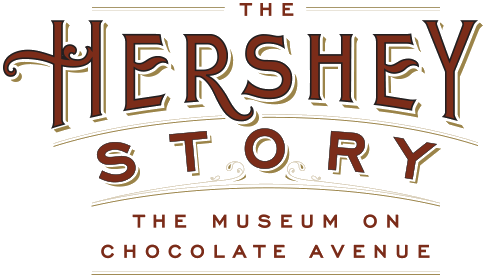

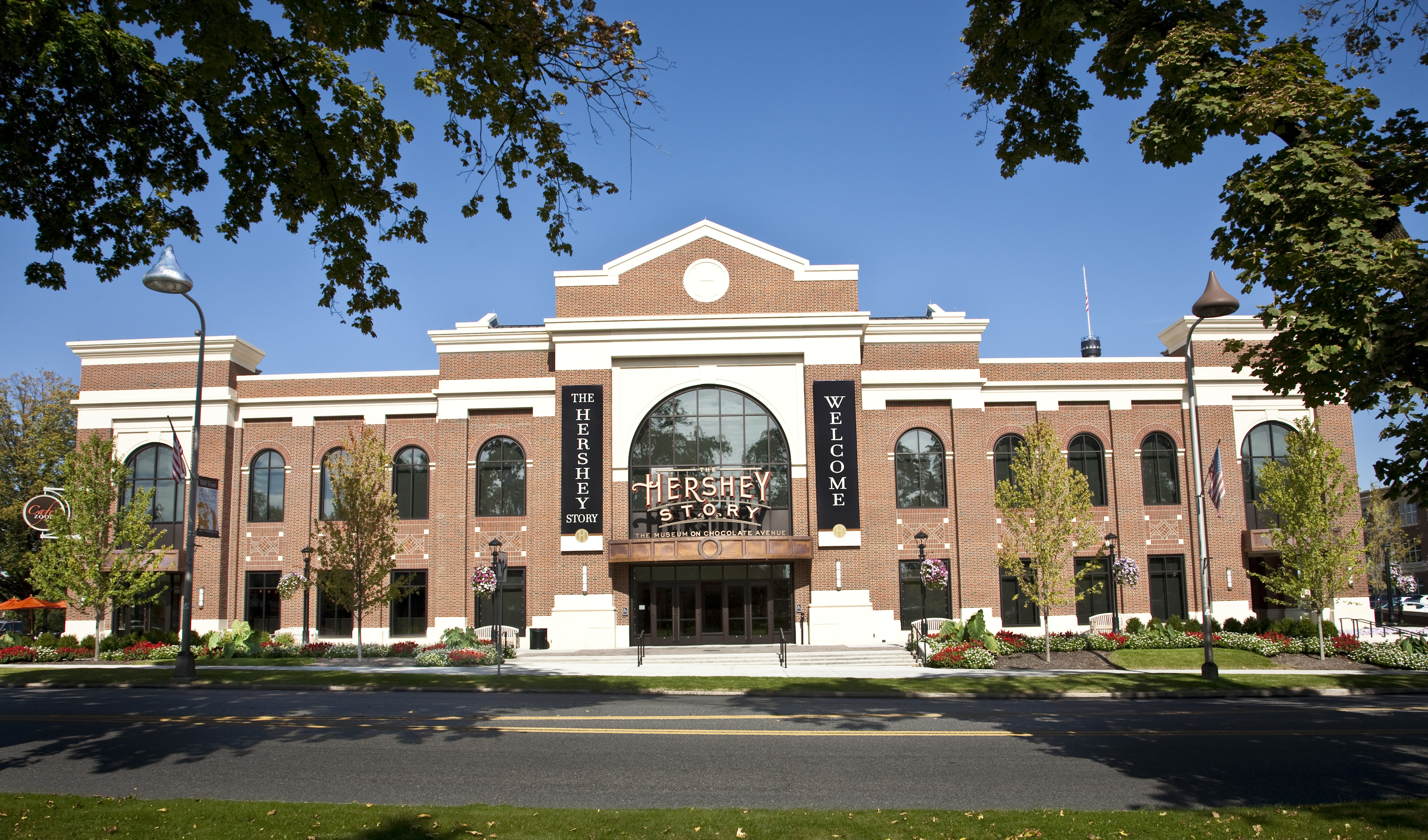
- Established: 2009
- Location: 63 West Chocolate Avenue, Hershey, Pennsylvania, 17033, U.S.
- Coordinates: 40.2878902°N 76.6575766°W
- Website: hersheystory.org

The Hershey Story, The Museum on Chocolate Avenue is devoted to the history and legacy of Milton S. Hershey and the chocolate candy confections he invented. It is located at 63 West Chocolate Avenue in downtown Hershey, Pennsylvania, United States, and opened in January 2009.

The museum includes interactive exhibits including a Chocolate Lab, where visitors can pour and decorate their own chocolate bar, and exhibits about Milton Hershey, the Hershey business, and chocolate.

== History ==
In 1933, the Hershey American Indian Museum was founded. Its original collection consisted of Native American items. In 1935, Hershey expanded the collection by purchasing artifacts from the Pennsylvania German culture. In 1938, the museum moved from its original home to the convention hall in Hershey. In 2009, the museum moved into a new building and was renamed The Hershey Story, The Museum on Chocolate Avenue. The museum still retains its Native American and Pennsylvania German collections but they are not on view to the public.

== See also ==
- List of food and beverage museums
- Hershey's Chocolate World
