= Catherine Hershey =

American philanthropist (1871–1915)

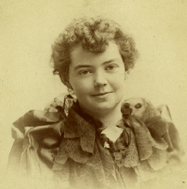
- Hershey c. 1890
- Born: Catherine Elizabeth Sweeney; July 6, 1871; Jamestown, New York, U.S.
- Died: March 25, 1915 (aged 43); Philadelphia, Pennsylvania, U.S.
- Resting place: Hershey Cemetery
- Spouse: Milton S. Hershey (m. 1898)

Catherine Elizabeth "Kitty" Sweeney Hershey (July 6, 1871 – March 25, 1915) was an American philanthropist. She was the wife of chocolatier Milton S. Hershey and co-founder with her husband of the Milton Hershey School.

== Early life ==
Hershey was born July 6, 1871, in Jamestown, New York, to Catherine Elizabeth Maloney and Michael William Sweeney, Irish immigrant parents. The town was situated north of Pennsylvania's lumber region, which facilitated a massive boom in Jamestown's commerce around the time of Sweeney's birth. "Catherine was born at the beginning of Jamestown’s renaissance," as described by one historical association.

Her family was not wealthy. Sweeney attended Jamestown High School but dropped out to work in 1888, her final year. She worked in retail most hours of the day for six days a week. One of the stores she was hired at was a local jeweler. Her main job was as a salesperson.

== Marriage to Milton Hershey ==
In the 1890s, Milton Hershey operated a caramel and confectionary shop in Lancaster, Pennsylvania. He was traveling through southern New York on business when he stopped in Jamestown. Here, he visited A.D. Work's Confectionary, a local hub frequented by Sweeney. The two met at Work's and struck up a friendship. Jamestown became a regular stop on Hershey's travels.

Sweeney eventually moved to New York City where she sold ribbons at Altman's Department Store. Her employment was short-lived, as Hershey proposed and she accepted. They married on May 25, 1898. The wedding posed a slight issue, as Hershey was raised Mennonite, and Sweeney was an Irish Catholic. When they were wed in New York's St. Patrick's Cathedral, they did so in the rectory. The ceremony was officiated by Father Thomas Murphy. It was a private affair with no attendants and only a few close friends present. The couple returned to Lancaster the next evening.

This photo shows Milton Hershey (back) with Catherine (left) in the gardens of High Point Mansion. Catherine Sweeney Hershey was a known gardener and designed the gardens at her homes and the Milton Hershey School.

When the two moved in together back in Lancaster, immediate problems arose between Sweeney and her mother-in-law. Regardless, their marriage was seen as successful and happy, especially when Hershey purchased a nearby home for his mother (a tactic he would also employ when they moved to and settled in Hershey.) During this time, Sweeney was "described as a beautiful woman with a quick wit, breath-taking smile, and warm personality; she brought joy and beauty to his life as well as companionship and a shared sense of purpose."

Catherine Sweeney was as much a figure as Hershey was in their lives. Milton spoke often of her, and Catherine had been well liked by many of his friends and others. She "was expected to both entertain her husband’s personal acquaintances and business associates as well as supervise the domestic side of their lives." Hershey cared for his wife deeply and was always trying to "swoon" and charm her.

== Philanthropy ==
Catherine Sweeney Hershey was an active philanthropist and inspired her husband to be an active philanthropist himself. Catherine was a founding member of the Lancaster Charity Society in 1904. She served on its Conference Committee and was one of only seven original life members. Her influence is also credited with prompting Milton Hershey's first documented charitable gift, $5,000 to equip a chemistry laboratory at Franklin & Marshall College in 1902. When the Roman Catholic Diocese of Harrisburg was starting construction of the Cathedral of Saint Patrick in the commonwealth's capital, Catherine Hershey made a sizable donation. The Diocese recognized her contribution by putting the name "Mrs. M.S. Hershey" in an inscription just inside the church's entrance. She is listed in the first two annual reports of Lancaster Charity Society as a member. This society helped the city's poor and needy families.

Upon their relocation to the new Hershey Chocolate factory in Hershey, Pennsylvania, she and her husband worked to found the Milton Hershey School. She worked closely with Prudence Copenhaver, wife of the school's first superintendent, where she assisted "in planning the home life program – including menus, clothing, social skills" and more. She signed the Deed of Trust to the school alongside Milton Hershey which suggests she was directly involved as partner in the business, planning, administration, and operation of the school.

She was also known for her landscape and interior design.

== Illness and death ==
Sometime in the early 1900s, Catherine became ill. Her disease was debilitative, but not named by sources, leaving most historians and writers to speculate what it exactly was, but commonly stated that it affected her nervous system. The disease would cause a numbness in her limbs. By 1915, she was hospitalized in Philadelphia. When Hershey arrived, his wife greeted him briefly and asked for a glass of champagne. Her husband went to get it, but upon his return, she had died. Hershey carried a photo of his wife with him every day until his death; he never remarried.

Catherine Sweeney Hershey was interred for four years at the West Laurel Hill Cemetery receiving vault in Bryn Mawr, Pennsylvania, but later moved to the Hershey Cemetery after it was established. On the day of the funeral, March 27, 1915, "Milton Hershey gave his employees the day off and provided a free train ticket to Philadelphia so they could attend the service."

== Legacy ==
Catherine Hershey Schools for Early Learning, a network of tuition-free early childhood education centers operated by the Milton Hershey School Trust, is named in her honor. Centers have opened in Hershey (2023), Harrisburg (2024), and Middletown (2025), with further locations planned through 2027.
