= Milton S. Hershey =

American chocolatier (1857–1945)

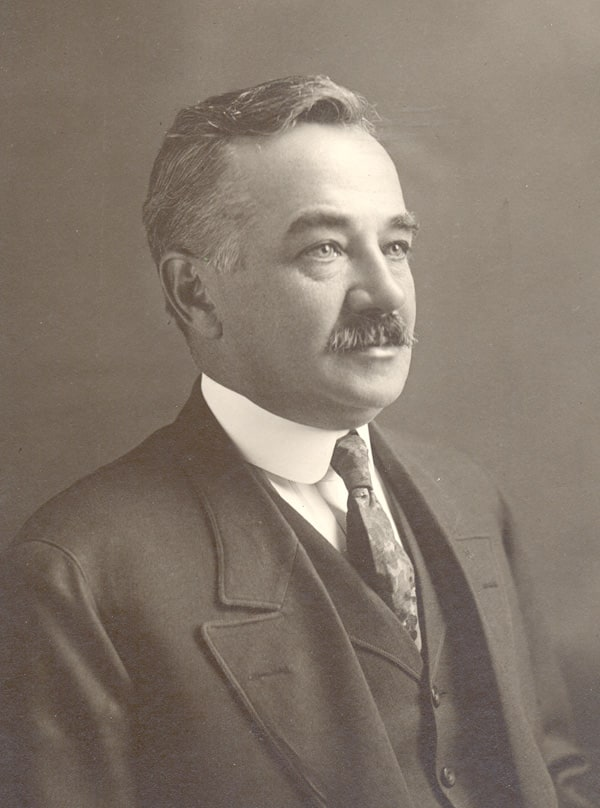
- Hershey in 1905
- Born: Milton Snavely Hershey; September 13, 1857; Derry Township, Pennsylvania, U.S.
- Died: October 13, 1945 (aged 88); Hershey, Pennsylvania, U.S.
- Resting place: The Hershey Memorial, Hershey Cemetery
- Other name: The Chocolate King
- Occupations: Confectioner; businessman; philanthropist
- Known for: Founding of The Hershey Company
- Spouse: Catherine "Kitty" Elizabeth Sweeney (m. 1898; died 1915)
- Website: www.hersheyland.com/home

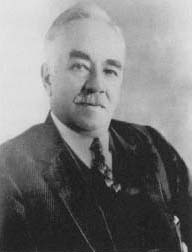
Milton S. Hershey, c. 1915

Milton Snavely Hershey (September 13, 1857 – October 13, 1945) was an American chocolatier, businessman, and philanthropist.

Trained in the confectionery business, Hershey pioneered the manufacture of caramel using fresh milk. He launched the Lancaster Caramel Company, which achieved bulk exports, and then sold it to start a new company supplying mass-produced milk chocolate, previously a luxury good.

The first Hershey bars were sold in 1900 and proved so popular that he was able to build his own company town of Hershey, Pennsylvania. Hershey's philanthropy extended to a boarding school, originally for local orphans, but accommodating around 2,000 students as of 2016. In World War II, the company developed a special non-melting bar for troops serving overseas. The Hershey Company, known as Hershey's, is one of the world's biggest confectionery manufacturers.

== Early life ==
Milton Hershey was born on September 13, 1857, to Henry and Veronica "Fanny" (née Snavely) Hershey. Of Swiss and German descent, his family were members of Pennsylvania's Mennonite community, and he grew up speaking Pennsylvania Dutch.

In April 1862, Hershey's sister Sarena Hershey was born in Derry Township, Dauphin County, Pennsylvania, and died in 1867 at age 4.

Hershey had a very limited education, with no schooling beyond the fourth grade. In 1871, Milton Hershey left school and was apprenticed to a local printer, Sam Ernst, who published a German-English newspaper. He soon lost this job and took up the candy trade after recommendation by his family. His mother arranged for the 14-year-old Hershey to be apprenticed to a confectioner named Joseph Royer in Lancaster, Pennsylvania. He studied under Royer for four years. In 1876, he moved to Philadelphia to start his first confectionery business.

Milton then traveled to Denver and, finding work at a local confectioners, learned how to make caramels using fresh milk. He then went to New Orleans and Chicago looking for opportunities, before settling in New York City in 1883 and training at Huyler's. He started his second business that, while initially successful, lasted only three years, closing in 1886.

== Lancaster Caramel Company ==
Hershey returned to Lancaster in 1883 and started the Lancaster Caramel Company, which became a success. By the early 1890s, Lancaster Caramel Company had begun employing over 1,300 workers in two factories. After traveling to Chicago for the World's Columbian Exposition, Hershey became interested in chocolate. He sold Lancaster Caramel Company for $1 million to start the Hershey Chocolate Company.

== The Hershey Chocolate Company ==
Using the proceeds from the 1900 sale of the Lancaster Caramel Company, Hershey initially acquired farm land roughly 30 miles (50 km) northwest of Lancaster, near his birthplace of Derry Township. He created his own formula, and the first Hershey bar was produced in 1900. Hershey's Kisses were developed in 1907, and the Hershey's Bar with almonds was introduced in 1908.

The factory was in the center of a dairy farmland, but with Hershey's support, houses, businesses, churches and a transportation infrastructure accreted around the factory. The area around the factory eventually became known as the company town of Hershey, Pennsylvania.

== Marketing and advertising ==
Hershey used unconventional methods to promote his products throughout his career. In 1895, he patented a machine for cutting candy, and in 1898 he adopted the "baby-in-the-bean" trademark, which the company used in various forms until 1968. In 1900, he purchased what is thought to be Lancaster's first automobile, an electric Riker delivery vehicle, and painted "Hershey's Cocoa" on each side. The vehicle was used to attract attention while delivering products around Pennsylvania. Early advertising for Hershey's milk chocolate used the slogan "Made on the Farm" alongside images of cows and farmland, leaning on its rural roots. Hershey also experimented with advertising in film; in 1927, a Hershey milk chocolate bar appeared in a scene in Wings, the first film to receive the Academy Award for Best Picture.

== Philanthropy ==
Hershey and his wife established the Hershey Industrial School with a deed of trust in 1909.

In 1918, Hershey transferred the majority of his assets, including control of the company, to the Milton Hershey School Trust fund, to benefit the Hershey Industrial School. The trust fund has a majority of voting shares in the Hershey Company, allowing it to keep control of the company. In 1951, the school was renamed the Milton Hershey School. The Milton Hershey School Trust also has 100% control of Hershey Entertainment and Resorts Company, which owns the Hotel Hershey and Hersheypark, among other properties.

Hershey built Hershey Cemetery on Laudermilch Road in Hershey, Pennsylvania. On July 31, 1923, Hershey transferred the land for the cemetery for $1.00.

In 1935, Hershey established the M.S. Hershey Foundation, a private charitable foundation that provides educational and cultural opportunities for Hershey residents. The foundation supplies funding for three entities: the Hershey Museum and Hershey Gardens, the Hershey Theatre and the Hershey Community Archives.

The founding of the Penn State Milton S. Hershey Medical Center occurred in 1963 when the board of the trust went to the Dauphin County Orphans Court with the cy-près doctrine (cy près is a French phrase meaning "As close as possible"). It was a gift from the Milton Hershey School Trust to the people of Pennsylvania, with an initial endowment of $50 million and only one restriction—the hospital had to be built in Hershey. The hospital is a teaching hospital, with an annual budget exceeding the initial construction cost.

== Close call of the Titanic ==
In 1912, the Hersheys were booked to travel on the maiden voyage of the British luxury liner RMS Titanic. They canceled their reservations at the last minute due to business matters requiring Hershey's attention. The cancellation is often incorrectly attributed to Kitty Hershey falling ill, but by this time, she had been ill for several years. Instead, they booked passage to New York on the German luxury liner SS Amerika. The former Hershey Museum displayed a copy of the check Milton Hershey wrote to the White Star Line as a deposit for a first-class stateroom on the Titanic. This copy is now located in the archives of the Hershey Story Museum, which replaced the original Hershey Museum in 2009.

== World War II ==
Hershey Chocolate supplied the U.S. Armed Forces with military chocolate bars during World War II. These bars were called Ration D Bars and Tropical Chocolate Bars. The Ration D Bar had very specific requirements from the army: it had to weigh 1 or 2 ounces (28 or 57 g), it had to resist melting at temperatures higher than 90 °F (32 °C), and it had to have an unpleasant-enough flavor to prevent the troops from developing cravings for them. After a year or two, the Army was impressed enough with the durability and success of the Ration D Bar to commission Hershey to make the Tropical Chocolate Bar. The only difference between them was that the Tropical Chocolate Bar was made to taste better than the Ration D Bar and still be as durable. Tropical Chocolate Bars were designed to not melt in the tropical weather. It is estimated that between 1940 and 1945, over three billion of the Ration D and Tropical Chocolate Bars were produced and distributed to soldiers throughout the world. In 1939, the Hershey plant was capable of producing 100,000 ration bars a day. By the end of World War II, the entire Hershey plant was producing ration bars at a rate of 24 million a week. For its service throughout World War II, the Hershey Chocolate Company was issued five Army–Navy 'E' Production Awards for exceeding expectations for quality and quantity in the production of the Ration D and Tropical Chocolate Bars. The Hershey factory machine shop even made some parts for tanks and machines during the war.

== Personal life ==
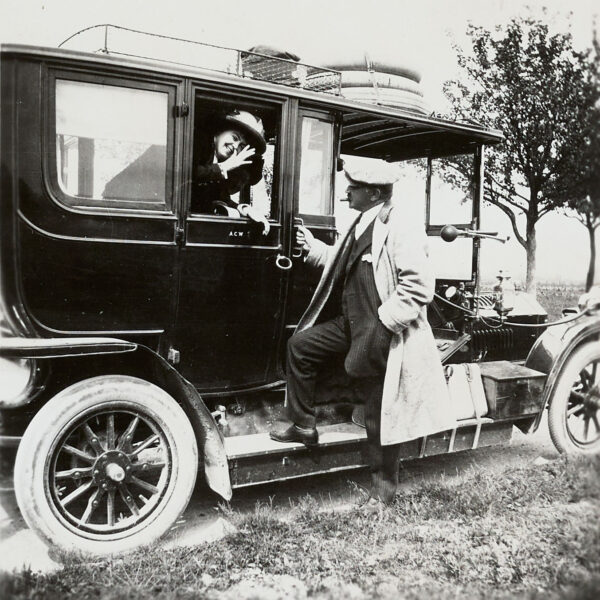
Hershey (right) with his wife Catherine c. 1910

On May 25, 1898, Hershey married Catherine Elizabeth "Kitty" Sweeney (b. 1871), an Irish-American Catholic from Jamestown, New York. The couple did not have any children.

On March 25, 1915, Catherine died of an unknown disease. In 1919, Hershey moved Catherine's body from Philadelphia to Hershey Cemetery. In March 1920, Hershey's mother, Fanny Hershey, died and she was buried in Hershey Cemetery. In late 1930, his father's body was moved there.

=== Death ===
Hershey died of pneumonia in Hershey Hospital on October 13, 1945, at the age of 88. Hershey is buried at Hershey Cemetery, a cemetery which he built, on Laudermilch Road in Hershey, Pennsylvania. Hershey's grave is located at Section Spec-Her, Lot 1, Grave 1, next to his wife (Grave 2).

== Legacy ==
At the Hershey School, there is a bronze statue of Milton Hershey with an orphan boy wrapped in his arms. Below the statue are these words: "His deeds are his monument. His life is our inspiration."

Hershey's birthday, September 13, is one of several competing dates celebrated as International Chocolate Day.

On September 13, 1995, the United States Postal Service issued a 32-cent stamp for Milton S. Hershey, which honors him as a philanthropist, as part of the Great Americans series. The stamp was designed by Dennis Lyall, an artist from Norwalk, Connecticut.

Catherine Hershey Schools for Early Learning, a network of tuition-free early childhood education centers operated by the Milton Hershey School Trust, is named in honor of Hershey's wife, Catherine. Centers have opened in Hershey (2023), Harrisburg (2024), and Middletown (2025), with further locations planned through 2027.

== See also ==
- Milton S. Hershey Mansion
- List of chocolatiers
