= Jason Wolfe (ice hockey) =

American ice hockey player and coach

- Born: November 26, 1977 (age 48) College Park, Maryland, U.S.
- Height: 6 ft 5 in (196 cm)
- Weight: 230 lb (104 kg; 16 st 6 lb)
- Position: Goaltender
- Caught: Left
- CHL team Former teams: New Mexico Scorpions; Oklahoma City Blazers
- Playing career: 1998–2009

Jason Wolfe (born November 26, 1977), is an American professional ice hockey player and goaltender coach.

== Early life ==
Wolfe was born in College Park, Maryland. He began his career at the NCAA level, playing for Merrimack Warriors men's ice hockey team. Wolfe spent four seasons in Massachusetts, but was used mainly as a backup goaltender, making 18 appearances in his time there.

== Career ==
After completing his final college season in which he played 10 games and posted a .914 save percentage, Wolfe was signed by the Reading Royals for the remainder of the 2001–02 term, where he allowed seven goals on 87 shots in three ECHL games. He signed with the Adirondack IceHawks at the lower UHL level, where for the first time in his career he managed to claim the first team spot. Wolfe also featured in the post-season for the IceHawks.

Wolfe's displays for the IceHawks demonstrated to the Roanoke Express that he deserved a chance to start at ECHL level, and they signed him for the start of the 2003–04 season. It was a chance which Wolfe seized, making 37 regular and two post-season appearances. Despite his positive showing, Wolfe was to split the following season between the Mississippi Sea Wolves, Bakersfield Condors and Texas Wildcatters. After playing with the Augusta Lynx for the 2005–06 season, the Manchester Phoenix, a team in Britain's EIHL, signed Wolfe in the summer of 2006 to play as their starting goaltender.

Wolfe again played well in the #1 role, appearing in a career high 53 games, and was one of the Phoenix' most reliable players in a season which saw the team play for most of the term without a home rink. Wolfe opted not to re-sign the following year, in part because of the birth of his first child. Coach Tony Hand opted to sign ex-NHL goaltender Scott Fankhouser as a result. Wolfe took the opportunity to move back to North America where he played the 2007–2008 season for the Oklahoma City Blazers of the CHL and posted a .910 save percentage while appearing in 35 games.

Wolfe remained in the CHL for the 2008–09 term, signing for the New Mexico Scorpions.
