= Blackhawk Network Holdings =

US privately held company

Blackhawk Network Holdings, Inc.
- Type: Private
- Industry: Branded Payments, Gift Cards, Prepaid, and Financial Services
- Headquarters: Pleasanton, California, United States
- Area served: Global
- Key people: William Y. Tauscher (executive chairman); Talbott Roche (CEO and president); David McLaughlin (CFO); Nikhil Sathe (CTO)
- Owner: Silver Lake Partners and P2 Capital Partners
- Number of employees: 3,190
- Website: blackhawknetwork.com

Blackhawk Network Holdings Inc. is an American privately held company that operates in the prepaid, gift card and payments industries. It sells branded physical and digital gifts, phones, prepaid debit, and incentives cards online and through a network of global retailers. Blackhawk's network operates through a number of different channels, including in-store, online, mobile, and incentive. Blackhawk headquarters are in Pleasanton, California and the company was incorporated in 2006.

The company originated selling gift cards through Safeway stores in 2001 and then expanded to other partners in the United States. The Nordstrom gift card was one of the first items launched by the group. The company grew over the following years by expanding content, channels and markets through organic growth and acquisition. This included the acquisition of the German startup Retailo and the purchase of Parago Inc. for $290 million. In 2013, the company filed for a $200 million IPO on NASDAQ. In 2014, Safeway divested the rest of its Blackhawk Network shares to make Blackhawk a fully independent company. In 2023, Safeway's final service contract was officially terminated with Blackhawk.

== History ==
Blackhawk was formed in 2001 as a subsidiary of Safeway Inc to sell gift cards in Safeway stores. The idea for the company came about after Donald Kingsborough came up with the concept of selling gift cards at Safeway stores while researching ways Safeway could grow its business. The first gift card offered was for Nordstorm. The gift card market began to grow quickly when Safeway Inc. customers could purchase a gift card as a convenient gift from an end cap or while waiting in a check out line.

Over the next few years, Blackhawk used the gift card program in Safeway and other global retailers as a platform to partner with more merchants. Brands operating under Blackhawk included The Home Depot, Barnes & Noble and McDonald's. The Gift Card Mall was created as a third-party sales location.

In August 2010, it was announced that Bill Tauscher would become the CEO of Blackhawk. Prior to this, he served as executive chairman from 2009.

In 2011. Cardpool was acquired by Blackhawk. Cardpool purchases pre-owned gift cards and sells them at large discounts.

Talbott Roche became president of Blackhawk in 2010. Roche had been part of the company since it was founded in 2001. Prior to her becoming president, she was nominated for the Stevie Award Women in Business, and was also recognized by Progressive Grocer as a Top Woman in Grocery. Roche also won the prestigious Paybefore Industry Achievement Award and was named one of the Top 5 Most Interesting People in Prepaid by Paybefore News.

It was announced in 2013 that Blackhawk would be filing its IPO and launching on the NASDAQ. The stock was floated at a total value of $200 million, following sales hitting $959 million for the previous financial year. Goldman Sachs, Bank of America, Merrill Lynch, Citi and Deutsche Bank were the joint bookrunners on the deal. Blackhawk made another acquisition in 2013, buying the company InteliSpend. The acquisition was seen as an expansion in a similar market to gift cards, with InteliSpend providing corporate incentives and consumer promotion products. Around a similar period of time, the company also announced a partnership with PayPal to provide gift card services through PayPal's digital wallet.

Following the IPO announcement, Blackhawk announced the purchase of the German-based startup, Retailo. The acquisition in late 2013 was estimated to be around $50 million. Retailo would remain in Germany, operating as a subsidiary of Blackhawk. In 2014, Blackhawk announced its acquisition of Parago Inc for $290 million. Parago would provide expertise in designing incentive programs having already designed reward-based incentive programs for companies including Dell, General Electric, and Toyota.

Blackhawk's parent company, Safeway Inc., completed a spin-off of Blackhawk in April 2014. This was done by distributing 37.8 million shares of Blackhawk stock to Safeway shareholders. Later that year, Blackhawk announced that they would be acquiring Dallas, Texas-based CardLab.

In January 2015, Blackhawk launched Blackhawk Engagement Solutions. The division focuses on engagement, incentive and rebate programs. Blackhawk Engagement Solutions was also formed to group together a number of incentive providers the company had acquired, including Incentec Solutions, Incentive CardLab, InteliSpend, and Parago. Blackhawk also announced the acquisition of Achievers and Netherlands-based DIDIX Gifting & Promotions in 2015.

In early 2016, it was announced that Talbott Roche would become the CEO while remaining in her current role as President. The move came after Blackhawk had experienced rapid growth over the previous five years, tripling its revenue. Around the same time, Blackhawk also acquired the ecommerce company, NimbleCommerce. A couple of months later, Blackhawk announced that they would be acquiring extrameasures. No terms of the deal were disclosed.

Blackhawk announced in September 2016 that they would be acquiring Grass Roots Group Holdings Ltd., a provider of customer and employee engagement. According to Incentive magazine, the acquisition totaled $118 million. Following the acquisition, Grass Roots confirmed they would operate as a subsidiary company of Blackhawk's, with operations in Europe and Asia-Pacific continuing as they did prior to the acquisition. At the end of 2016, Blackhawk acquired the gift card company Spafinder.

On August 30, 2017, Blackhawk announced the acquisition of Portland, Maine-based CashStar, which provides digital gift cards to major retailers and restaurants, for $175 million in cash.

On January 16, 2018, Blackhawk announced that it would be acquired by Silver Lake and P2 Capital Partners for $3.5 Billion.

On April 8, 2020, Blackhawk acquired SVM Cards, a provider of gas station and retail branded gift cards in the gift and B2B spaces.

On November 6, 2020, Blackhawk Network announced it had completed its acquisition of National Gift Card (NGC), one of North America's largest card and prepaid technology companies.

In the summer of 2022, Blackhawk Network launched the employee benefits platform Blackhawk Network Extras.

On January 5. 2023, the last of Safeway's Blackhawk gift cards were taken offline, ending Blackhawk's relationship with its former parent company.

== Market ==
Blackhawk announced two partnerships in 2015. The first was with Stockpile, to distribute gift cards on their behalf. The move was seen as innovative by the Palo Alto-based startup, as it allowed consumers to purchase a gift card that can be redeemed to open and fund an account with stock. By partnering with Blackhawk, Stockpile would sell their gift card products in retail stores already partnered with Blackhawk. Samsung announced a partnership with Blackhawk later the same year to allow gift cards to be integrated into Samsung Pay.

In May 2016, when Priceline founder Jay Walker first announced the launch of Upside, a gift card rewards program for business travelers willing to be more flexible with their bookings, he stated he would be working with Blackhawk.
