= Hershey Cemetery =

Cemetery in Hershey, Pennsylvania

- Interactive map of Hershey Cemetery

Details
- Established: 1918; 108 years ago
- Location: Hershey, Pennsylvania
- Country: United States
- Coordinates: 40°16′42″N 76°39′4″W
- Size: 81 acres (33 ha)
- Website: hersheycemetery.com
- Find a Grave: Hershey Cemetery

Hershey Cemetery is a cemetery located in Hershey, Pennsylvania, United States. It was founded in 1918 and is the site of many notable burials.

== History ==
Hershey, Pennsylvania, was established in 1884 and Milton S. Hershey established many of the town's amenities. While many of the local churches had cemeteries, the town of Hershey had no community cemetery until Hershey Cemetery was established in 1918.

Given that Hershey had a young population at the time of its establishment there was originally no need for a cemetery. However, by 1916, Milton Hershey saw the need for Hershey to establish a cemetery as his wife Catherine Sweeney Hershey died in 1915. Catherine Sweeney's body was held at Laurel Hill Cemetery until Hershey Cemetery was established.

Milton Hershey donated land that was on Laudermilch Road, one mile north of Hershey, Pennsylvania, that overlooked the Swatara Creek basin to be used as the site of the Hershey Cemetery. The cemetery's design and landscaping was based upon the community cemetery's planned design from 1915. Shrubbery and bushes were placed throughout the cemetery. On July 31, 1923, Hershey transferred the land into a cemetery for $1.00.

Milton Hershey built a marble monument reading "Hershey", which marks the spot of the Hershey family's grave plots. In 2007, on the 150th anniversary of Milton Hershey's birthday, flowers were placed at his gravesite.
