= List of companies based in the Harrisburg area =

This is a list of companies either based or with large operations in the greater Harrisburg, Pennsylvania metropolitan area of the United States. It includes companies based in the Pennsylvania counties of Adams, Cumberland, Dauphin, Lancaster, Lebanon, Perry and York.

== For-profit companies ==
- Appalachian Brewing Company (Harrisburg)
- Armstrong World Industries (Manor Township, near Lancaster)
- The Bon-Ton (Springettsbury Township, near York)
- CJ Pony Parts
- CloudInfoSystems LLC (Lower Paxton Township, Pennsylvania)
- D&H Distributing
- Fulton Financial Corporation (Lancaster)
- Gannett Fleming (East Pennsboro Township, near Camp Hill)
- Giant Food of Carlisle, Pennsylvania (Middlesex Township, near Carlisle)
- Glatfelter (York)
- Harsco (Wormleysburg, near Camp Hill)
- Herley Industries (West Hempfield Township, near Lancaster)
- The Hershey Company (Hershey, in Derry Township)
- Hershey Creamery Company (Lancaster County)
- Hershey Entertainment and Resorts Company (Hershey, in Derry Township)
- Isaac's Restaurant & Deli (Lancaster)
- JPL (Integrated Communications, Inc.)
- Karns Quality Foods (Silver Spring Township, near Mechanicsburg)
- Martin's Potato Chips (Thomasville, in Jackson Township)
- New World Pasta
- Ollie's Bargain Outlet (Harrisburg)
- Penn National Insurance (Harrisburg)
- PSECU (Harrisburg)
- Rutter's (Manchester Township, near York)
- Select Medical Corporation (Lower Allen Township, near Mechanicsburg)
- Snyder's of Hanover (Penn Township, near Hanover)
- Stackpole Books (Mechanicsburg, Pennsylvania)
- Susquehanna Polling & Research
- Stauffer's (York)
- Tröegs Brewing Company (Harrisburg)
- Turkey Hill (Conestoga)
- United Concordia (Susquehanna Township, near Harrisburg)
- Utz (Hanover)
- WebFX (Harrisburg)
- Weis Markets (Sunbury)

== Non-profit companies ==
- Capital Blue Cross (Susquehanna Township, near Harrisburg
- Cross Keys Village (Oxford Township, near New Oxford)
- Dickinson College (Carlisle)
- Harrisburg Area Community College (Harrisburg)
- Holy Spirit Hospital (East Pennsboro Township, near Camp Hill)
- Lancaster General Hospital (Lancaster)
- Lebanon Valley College (Annville, in Annville Township
- Love Harrisburg (Harrisburg)
- Penn State Milton S. Hershey Medical Center (Hershey, in Derry Township)
- Philhaven(West Cornwall Township, near Mount Gretna)
- PinnacleHealth System (Harrisburg)
- UPMC Central Pa
- WellSpan Health (York Township, near York)
- Youth Advocate Programs (Dauphin County)
- York College of Pennsylvania (Spring Garden Township, near York)
- YTI Career Institute (Springettsbury Township, near York)

== Sources used ==
- Central Penn Business Journal Book of Lists. Harrisburg, Pennsylvania: Central Penn Business Journal.
