= Karns =

Karns may refer to:

Places

- Karns, Tennessee, United States
- Karns City, Pennsylvania, United States
- Karns, Pennsylvania, United States

People

- Roscoe Karns (1891–1970), American actor
- Stephen Karns, American lawyer
- Todd Karns (1921–2000), American actor
- Virginia Karns (1907–1990), American singer and actress

Companies

- Karns Quality Foods, a supermarket chain in Pennsylvania

== See also ==
- Karnes (disambiguation)
