= JPL (disambiguation) =

JPL is the Jet Propulsion Laboratory, a NASA federally funded research and development center.

JPL may also refer to:

== Library bodies ==
- Jefferson Parish Library, library district in the United States
- Jacksonville Public Library, a library district in the United States
- Jewish Public Library (Montreal), a library in Canada

== Companies ==
- JPL (cyclecar), a defunct American motor vehicle manufacturer
- JPL (Integrated Communications, Inc.), an American branding and marketing company

== Sport leagues ==
- Jamaica Premier League, the top division association football league in Jamaica
- Jordanian Pro League, the top division association football league in Jordan
- Jupiler Pro League, the top division association football league in Belgium

== Other uses ==
- Jon Peter Lewis, an American musician (born 1979)
- 78577 JPL, the asteroid "JPL", the 78577th asteroid registered, a main-belt asteroid

== See also ==
- JPL sequence, a type of binary sequence used in telecommunications
