= Karnes =

Karnes may refer to:

== Places ==
- Karnes, Norway, near Lyngseidet
- Karnes City, Texas, United States
- Karnes County, Texas, United States

== Other uses ==
- Karnes (surname)
- USS Karnes (APA-175), 1944 American warship

== See also ==
- Karns (disambiguation)
