= Polyclinic Hospital =

Polyclinic Hospital may refer to:

- Polyclinic Medical Center in Harrisburg, Pennsylvania
- Stuyvesant Polyclinic Hospital in New York City
