= UPMC Central Pa =

American health care provider, founded 1996

- Company type: Private, Non-profit
- Industry: Medical
- Founded: 1996
- Headquarters: Harrisburg, PA
- Area served: Central Pennsylvania
- Key people: David Gibbons(President & CEO)
- Revenue: ▲1 billion (FY 2016)
- Number of employees: 11,000 employees; 2,900 medical staff
- Website: https://www.upmc.com/locations/hospitals/central-pa

UPMC Central PA, part of the University of Pittsburgh Medical Center (UPMC) system, is a healthcare provider in central Pennsylvania and surrounding rural communities. It has more than 2900 physicians and allied health professionals and has approximately 11000 employees that serve a 10-county area at outpatient facilities and seven acute care hospitals with over 1,360 licensed beds: UPMC Harrisburg, UPMC Community Osteopathic, UPMC West Shore, UPMC Carlisle, UPMC Hanover, UPMC Lititz, and UPMC Memorial. The not-for-profit system anticipates providing $17 million in community benefits and caring for more than 1.2 million residents in FY 2018.

== List of UPMC Central Pa facilities ==
Logo of the former PinnacleHealth System prior to the merger with UPMC in 2017

On September 11, 2017, UPMC Pinnacle unveiled its new branding since officially merging with UPMC.

Location of Hospitals

- UPMC Carlisle in Carlisle, Pennsylvania
- UPMC Community Osteopathic in Harrisburg, Pennsylvania
- UPMC Hanover in Hanover, Pennsylvania
- UPMC Harrisburg in downtown Harrisburg
  - Polyclinic Medical Center in uptown Harrisburg
- UPMC Lititz in Lititz, Pennsylvania
- UPMC Memorial in York, Pennsylvania
- UPMC West Shore in Mechanicsburg, Pennsylvania

Former facilities:

  - Seidle Memorial Hospital in Mechanicsburg, Pennsylvania

Location of outpatient facilities in Pennsylvania: Annville, Camp Hill, Carlisle (several locations), Chambersburg, Dillsburg, Enola, Harrisburg (several locations), Hershey, Hummelstown, Lemoyne, Mechanicsburg (several locations), Middletown, Millersburg, Newport, Shippensburg.

== See also ==
- List of hospitals in Harrisburg
