= CJ Pony Parts =

Auto parts store in Skyline View, Pennsylvania

CJ Pony Parts, Inc.
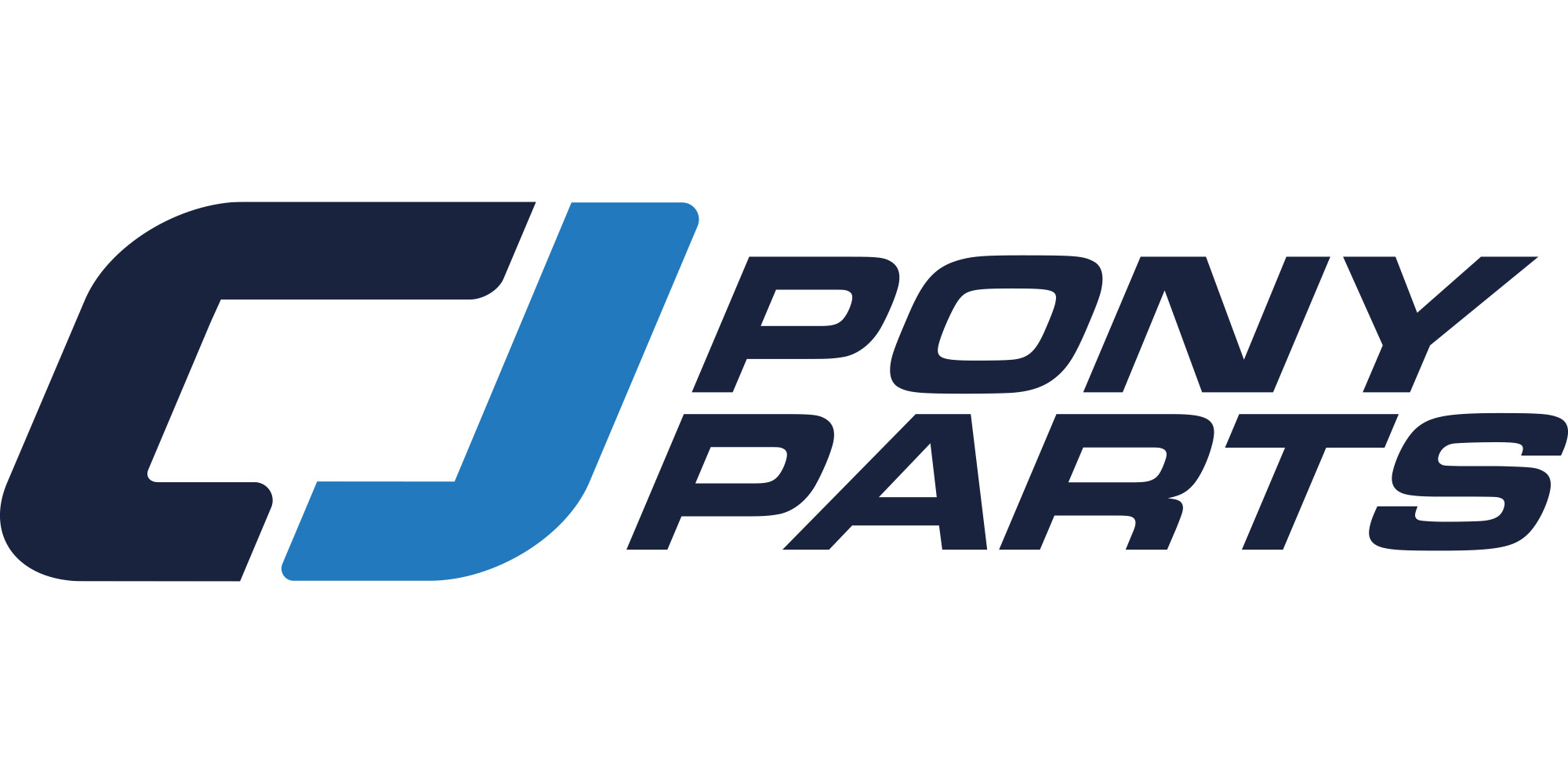
- Type: Privately held company
- Industry: Aftermarket (automotive)
- Founders: Jay Zeigler & Creed Stammel
- Headquarters: Harrisburg, Pennsylvania
- Area served: Worldwide
- Brands: American Powertrain; Brothers Trucks; Classic Muscle Parts; Scott Drake
- Website: www.cjponyparts.com

CJ Pony Parts, Inc., is an American retailer of aftermarket parts for the Ford Mustang modification, upgrades and restoration, based in Harrisburg, Pennsylvania. The company was founded in 1985 by Jay Zeigler and Creed Stammel. Ranging in offerings for 1964-1/2 to present Mustangs, CJ Pony Parts was rated one of Central Pennsylvania's Top 50 Fastest Growing Companies in 2013, and still continue to make the list this year in 2016. CJ Pony Parts has also featured multiple vehicles at The SEMA Show including a custom built 1965 Ford Mustang Fastback and 2015 Ford Focus ST on behalf of Ford Motor Company. Aside from Ford Mustang parts, CJ Pony Parts also carries parts for the Ford Focus ST, Ford Fiesta ST, F-150 and early model Ford Bronco along with Jeep, Chevrolet, Toyota and Dodge truck parts. CJ Pony Parts recently launched a loyalty program.

== History ==
CJ Pony Parts was founded in Harrisburg, Pennsylvania, in 1985 after seeing that there was a high demand for early model Mustang parts in the central Pennsylvania area while restoring a 1968 Mustang Coupe. Still led today by one of the original founders, Jay Zeigler, CJ Pony Parts is an established company in the Ford Mustang aftermarket industry. In more recent years, CJ Pony Parts has become known for their DIY installation guides, featuring Product Specialist and Video Host Bill Tumas, these installation videos hosted on YouTube aim to aid enthusiasts with modifications and upgrades to their Mustang.

In April 2021, CJ Pony Parts was recapitalized by Century Park Capital Partners. In July 2024, CJ Pony Parts expanded its portfolio through the acquisition of American Powertrain, a manufacturer of transmission and drivetrain systems for classic vehicles. In June 2026, CJ Pony Parts further expanded its presence in the automotive restoration market by acquiring the Scott Drake and Brothers Trucks brands from Holley Performance Brands, adding two well-known restoration brands focused on classic Ford Mustangs and Chevrolet/GMC trucks.

== Charitable Initiatives ==
Active in their community, CJ Pony Parts donates frequently to local charitable organizations and causes. Most often, their annual Customer Appreciation Day car show supports the Four Diamonds Fund based out of the Penn State Milton S. Hershey Medical Center which supports conquering childhood cancer. In 2015, Make-A-Wish Foundation child and Mustang fan Caleb, visited CJ's Harrisburg location on his birthday to check out the Mustang project cars, help out in an installation video and tour the CJ Pony Parts facility.
