= Seidle Memorial Hospital =

Coordinates: 40.25758°N 76.88033°W

Seidle Memorial Hospital was a community hospital located in Mechanicsburg, Pennsylvania, and part of the PinnacleHealth System, a primary chain of hospitals and clinics serving central Pennsylvania. The hospital provided outpatient services including ambulatory surgery, FirstPlace Health Care (urgent care center), women's health, physical and occupational therapy and diagnostic radiology. The facility also housed a 35-bed hospital-based skilled nursing unit.

The hospital was built on the grounds of the former Irving Female College and the building complex incorporates its President's Mansion. The hospital closed in the mid 2000s and was purchased by Fox Subacute.

== See also ==
- List of hospitals in Harrisburg
