= Babes in Toyland (1934 film) =

1934 musical film by Gus Meins, Charles Rogers

- Theatrical release poster
- Directed by: Gus Meins; Charles Rogers
- Screenplay by: Frank Butler; Nick Grinde
- Based on: Babes in Toyland (operetta), book by: Glen MacDonough; Anna Alice Chapin
- Produced by: Hal Roach
- Starring: Stan Laurel; Oliver Hardy; Charlotte Henry
- Cinematography: Francis Corby; Art Lloyd
- Edited by: Bert Jordan; William H. Terhune
- Music by: Victor Herbert; Glen MacDonough; Harry Jackson
- Production companies: Hal Roach Studios; Metro-Goldwyn-Mayer
- Distributed by: Loew's Incorporated
- Release date: November 30, 1934
- Running time: 78 minutes
- Country: United States
- Language: English

Babes in Toyland is a Laurel and Hardy musical Christmas film released on November 30, 1934. The film is also known by the alternative titles Laurel and Hardy in Toyland, Revenge Is Sweet (the 1948 European reissue title), and March of the Wooden Soldiers (in the United States), a 73-minute abridged version.

Based on Victor Herbert's popular 1903 operetta Babes in Toyland, the film was produced by Hal Roach, directed by Gus Meins and Charles Rogers, and distributed by Metro-Goldwyn-Mayer. There are two computer-colorized versions between The Samuel Goldwyn Company in 1991 and Legend Films in 2006.

Although the 1934 film makes use of many of the characters in the original play, as well as several of the songs, the plot is almost completely unlike that of the original stage production. In contrast to the stage version, the film's story takes place entirely in Toyland, which is inhabited by Mother Goose (Virginia Karns) and other well-known fairy tale and nursery rhyme characters.

== Plot ==
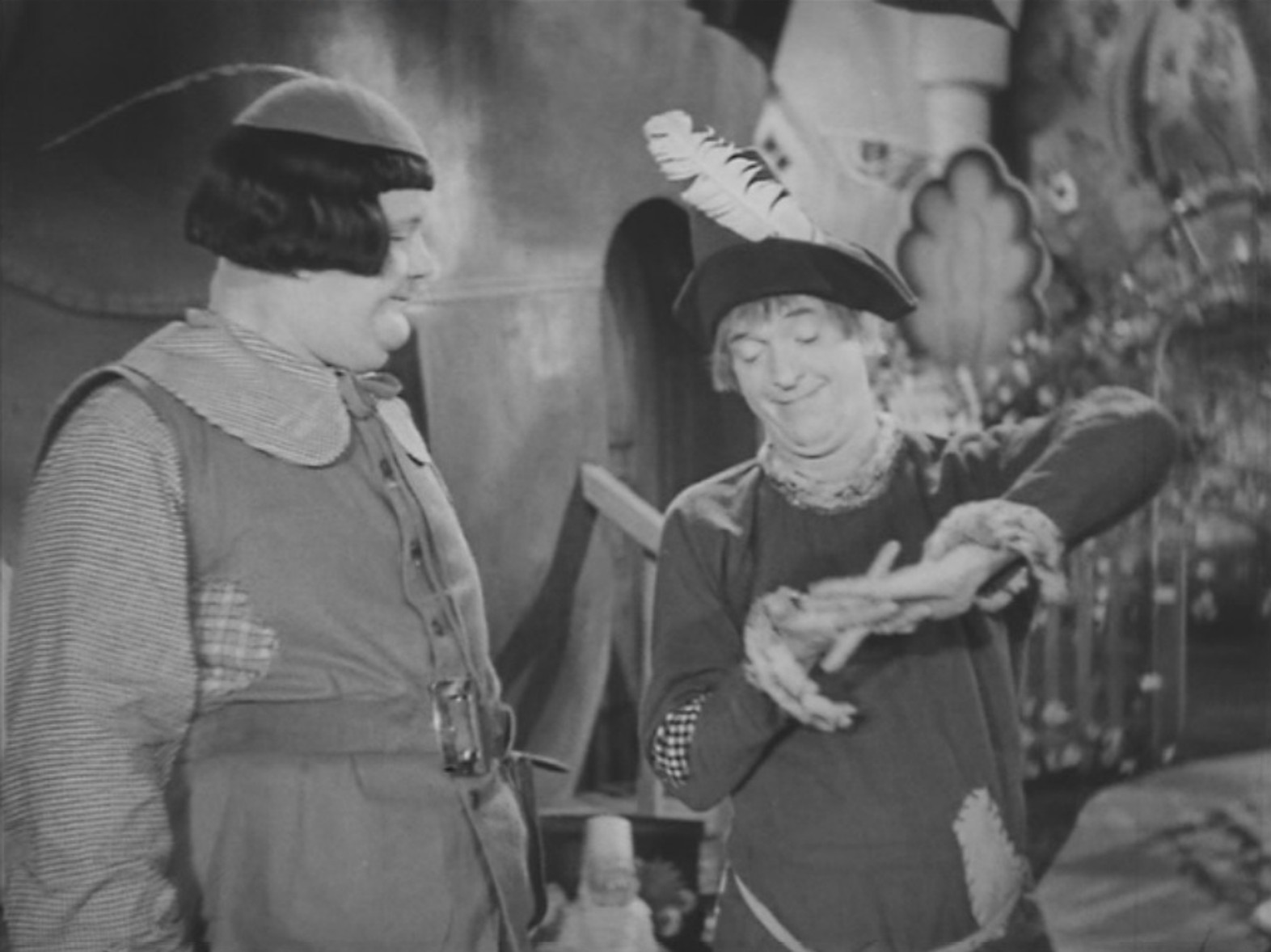
Ollie Dee and Stannie Dum

Stannie Dum and Ollie Dee inhabit a shoe residence alongside Mother Peep, Bo-Peep, and a diverse array of children. Their tranquil existence is disrupted by the malevolent Silas Barnaby, who harbors intentions to wed Bo-Peep and seize control of their shoe abode through foreclosure. Faced with imminent eviction, Ollie impulsively offers their meager savings to stave off the threat, unaware that Stannie has squandered the funds on peewees.

Subsequent attempts to procure the mortgage funds from their employer, the Toymaker, result in calamity when several wooden soldiers, made life-size due to Stannie and Ollie’s mistake, cause chaos in the toy shop, resulting in their dismissal. In a desperate gambit to thwart Barnaby, the duo embarks on a futile burglary endeavor, culminating in their arrest and sentencing to banishment in Bogeyland. Despite Bo-Peep's reluctant agreement to Barnaby's demands to spare their lives, Ollie endures a dunking and face impending exile.

Employing guile and resourcefulness, Stannie and Ollie devise a cunning scheme to disrupt Barnaby's machinations during Bo-Peep's wedding ceremony. By unveiling Stannie in Bo-Peep's bridal attire, they expose Barnaby's treachery and obliterate the mortgage, thus freeing Bo-Peep.

However, Barnaby exacts vengeance by framing Bo-Peep's true love, Tom-Tom, for "pignapping," leading to his unjust banishment to Bogeyland. In a race against time, Stannie and Ollie unravel Barnaby's scheme, ultimately rescuing Tom-Tom and exposing Barnaby's villainy to the townspeople. A climactic confrontation unfolds in Bogeyland, where Tom-Tom valiantly defends Bo-Peep from Barnaby's advances, while Stannie and Ollie join the fray to repel the Bogeymen. The film crescendos with the triumphant march of the wooden soldiers, orchestrated by Stannie and Ollie, driving back the Bogeymen and vanquishing Barnaby, restoring peace to Toyland.

As the kingdom celebrates its salvation, a comedic mishap ensues when Stannie and Ollie inadvertently bombard Ollie with darts from a malfunctioning cannon.

== Cast ==
- Virginia Karns as Mother Goose
- Charlotte Henry as Bo-Peep
- Felix Knight as Tom-Tom Piper
- Florence Roberts as Widow Peep
- Henry Brandon as Silas Barnaby
- Stan Laurel as Stanley "Stannie" Dum
- Oliver Hardy as Oliver "Ollie" Dee

Uncredited cast

- Frank Austin as Justice of the Peace
- Billy Bletcher as the Chief of Police
- William Burress as the Toymaker
- Russell Coles as Tom Tucker
- Zebedy Colt as Willie the Pig
- Alice Dahl as Little Miss Muffet
- Jean Darling as Curly Locks
- Johnny Downs as Little Boy Blue
- John George as Barnaby's Minion
- Sumner Getchell as Little Jack Horner
- Pete Gordon as The Cat and the Fiddle
- Robert Hoover as Bobby Shaftoe
- Payne B. Johnson as Jiggs the Pig
- Alice Moore as the Queen of Hearts
- Kewpie Morgan as Old King Cole
- Mickey Mouse as Himself
- Ferdinand Munier as Santa Claus
- Charley Rogers as Simple Simon
- Angelo Rossitto as Elmer the Pig
- Tiny Sandford as Dunker
- Marie Wilson as Mary Quite Contrary
- Scotty Mattraw as Town Crier

== Production ==
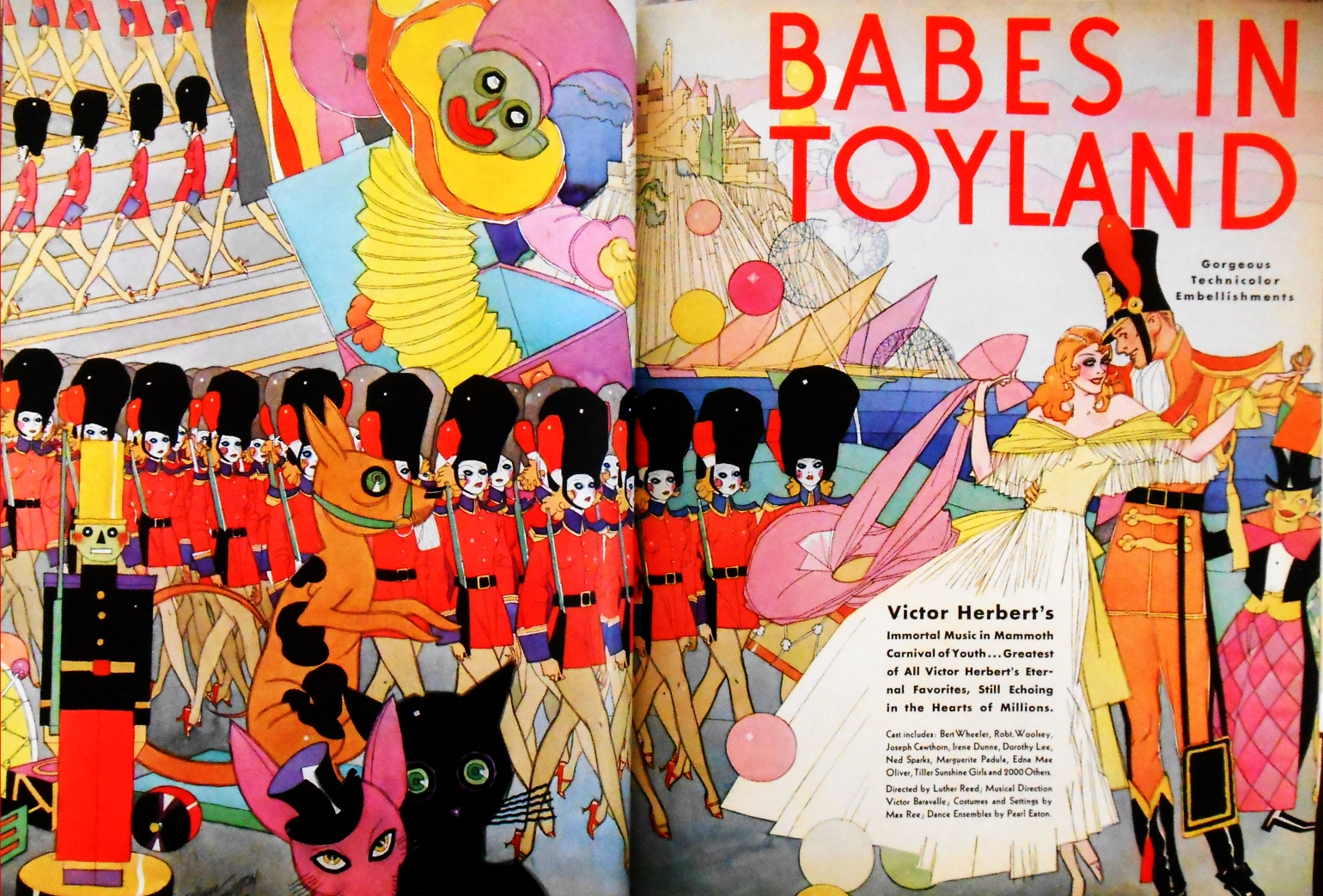
Radio Pictures announcement for musical film version of Babes in Toyland (1930) which was never realized.

RKO Pictures originally purchased the rights in 1930 with the plans of filming the musical partly in two-strip Technicolor. Plans were announced to have Bebe Daniels (later Irene Dunne) star in the musical along with the comedy team of Wheeler and Woolsey. Due to the backlash against musicals in the autumn of 1930, the plans were dropped. A couple of years later, some thought was given to filming the musical as an animated feature film to be shot in Technicolor by Walt Disney, however, the projected price of the film gave pause to RKO's plans. Hal Roach, who had seen the play as a boy, acquired the film rights to the project in November 1933.

The production was the biggest and most expensive film vehicle for Stan Laurel and Oliver Hardy's comedy at the time it was produced, as comedy films were most often seen as a way for studios in the 1930s to produce light-hearted entertainment on a low budget. The production was also beset with delays throughout the filming process caused by on set injuries, personal strife in Stan Laurel's private life, and sudden illnesses among the cast.

In spite of these issues, the film was completed in November 1934. The village of Toyland was built on sound stages at Hal Roach Studios with the buildings painted in vivid storybook colors, leading Stan Laurel to regret that the film wasn't shot in Technicolor. The film was originally produced in sepia tone and later colorized.

Walt Disney personally approved the appearance of Mickey Mouse in the film along with the use of the song "Who's Afraid of the Big Bad Wolf?".

== Reception ==
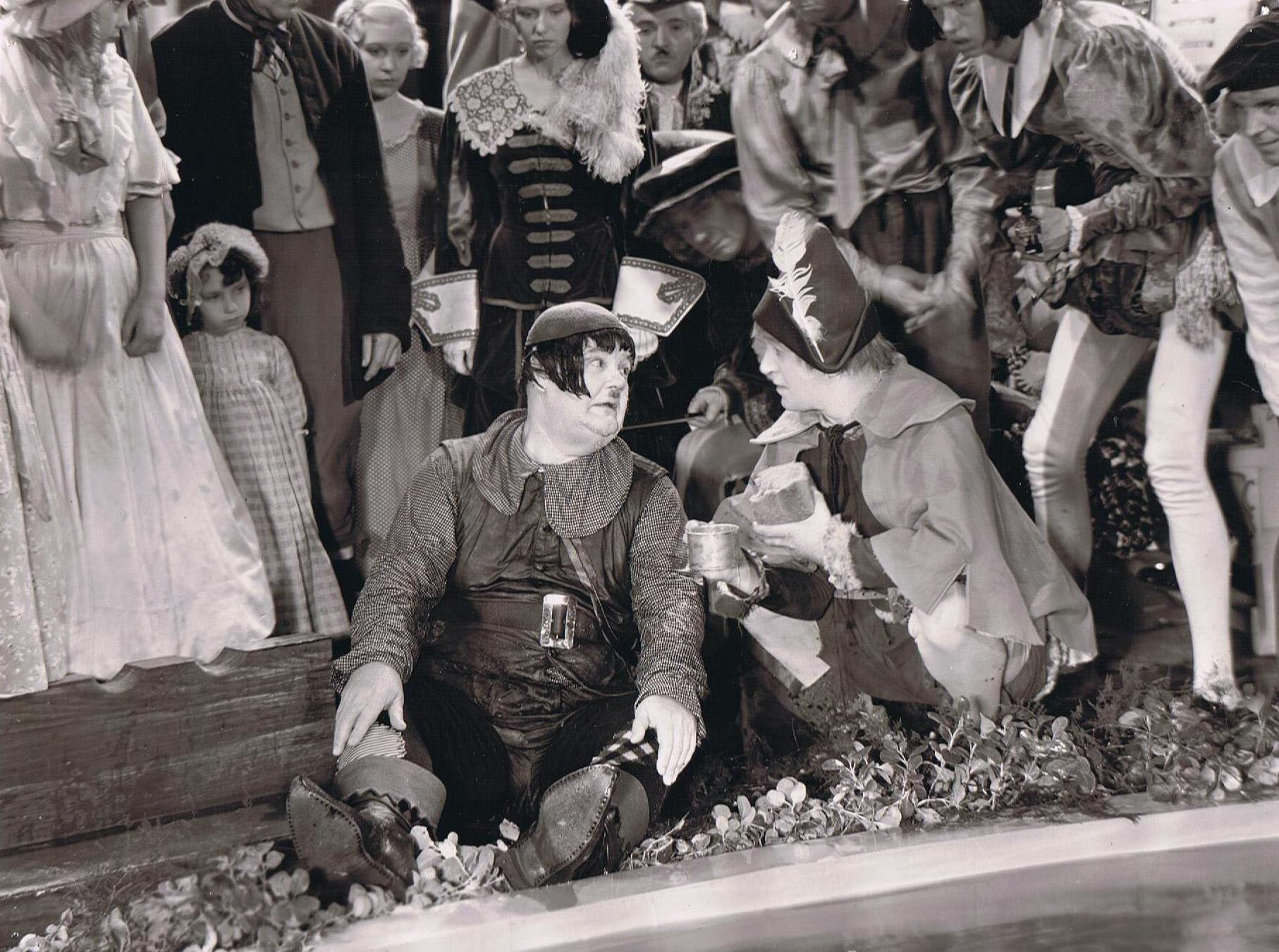
Publicity still

Critics' reviews were positive. Andre Sennwald of The New York Times called the film "an authentic children's entertainment and quite the merriest of its kind that Hollywood has turned loose on the nation's screens in a long time." Variety proclaimed it "a film par excellence for children. It's packed with laughs and thrills and is endowed with that glamour of mysticism which marks juvenile literature." John Mosher wrote in The New Yorker: "It's certainly far more successful than was last year's Alice in Wonderland, and the children will probably be far less bored by it than they generally are by those films designed especially for them". The Film Daily called it "delightful musical fantasy" and "dandy entertainment". The Chicago Tribune review read: "It's been many a long day since I've had so much pure (and I MEAN pure!) fun as I had watching this picture".

Babes in Toyland, one of many feature films with Stan Laurel and Oliver Hardy, was also popular at the box office. After it appeared in theaters, it was re-released several times with the title constantly changed, to make it seem to audiences that they were going to see a different film. It surfaced as a holiday movie on TV as March of the Wooden Soldiers, where it was rerun annually on some local affiliates for many years.

A holiday staple, this film was shown by many television stations in the United States during the Thanksgiving/Christmas holiday season, each year, during the 1960s and 1970s. In New York City, it continues to run (as of 2026) on WPIX as March of the Wooden Soldiers, airing on that station in the daytime on Thanksgiving Day and Christmas Day. It also runs nationally, on occasion, on This TV, as well as Turner Classic Movies.

== Ownership history ==
Author Scott MacGillivray writes, "The Laurel & Hardy film library has passed through many hands since Hal Roach began licensing his various properties in 1944. The rights have been scattered and splintered, and the inventory has been parceled off in many different directions. A good example is the long and checkered commercial career of Babes in Toyland." Roach's distributor Metro-Goldwyn-Mayer owned the original copyright on Babes in Toyland, as it did with all of the 1927-1938 Roach films it distributed and, after 1929, helped finance via advance money.

In June 1943, Roach acquired the rights to most of these films from MGM, including Babes in Toyland. While Roach retained much of this catalog and assigned reissue rights to Film Classics and other distributors, the rights to Babes in Toyland were sold in 1944 to the Victor Herbert estate, and the film's copyright was reassigned to Federal Films, owned by film producers Boris Morros and William LeBaron. Morros and LeBaron intended to produce a remake of the film, to be filmed in Cinecolor. When the producers bought the film rights, they inherited the negative of the 1934 Babes in Toyland. Having no need for the older picture, they licensed it to film broker Joe Auerbach, who paid $10,000 for worldwide reissue rights to the film (except for North America; those rights were reserved by Federal).

Plans changed when the Cinecolor company joined forces with a rival production company; the new script was rejected by the Motion Picture Production Code office; and the Victor Herbert estate made too many objections to suit Morros and LeBaron. Faced with these new complications, the producers abandoned their remake.

The North American rights of the Laurel and Hardy version were granted to independent producer and former exhibitor Robert L. Lippert in 1949. Lippert planned to make the film available to theaters during the holiday season of 1949, but the Victor Herbert estate insisted on certain changes before the film could be reissued. Lippert complied with the changes and reissued the film as March of the Wooden Soldiers in 1950. Lippert's 16mm prints (intended for nontheatrical use by schools, libraries, churches, film societies, and other institutions) were fully complete and unedited, but the 35mm prints released to theaters were shortened and edited according to the estate legalities.

1950 re-release poster for Babes in Toyland (1934)

The Herbert estate dictated that neither "Victor Herbert" nor "Babes in Toyland" could be mentioned in the new film reprint or any of the advertising. This necessitated the changing of the film's title, the omission of Herbert's name from the credits, and the removal of the opening song "Toyland". Also deleted were the "Go to Sleep (Slumber Deep)" number, Barnaby's attempted abduction of Little Bo-Peep, and his ultimate fistfight with Tom-Tom.

Later in the 1950s, television rights were licensed to Quality Pictures, and by 1952 TV rights reverted to Peerless Television Productions. New York TV station WPIX's long association with the film began with its initial airing on December 24, 1952, and it has aired almost annually ever since.

Allied Artists, successor to Monogram Pictures, acquired the film in 1959 (as a companion film to its Our Gang compilation Little Rascals Varieties). Allied Artists Television made March of the Wooden Soldiers available to local TV stations as a holiday special through the 1960s. In September 1970 Alex Campbell, Jr. of Prime TV Films acquired the film, and Prime has held the copyright ever since.

In 1971 LBJ Films, headed by independent distributor Ben Siegel, licensed the Lippert version of March of the Wooden Soldiers for saturation bookings, and sent 35mm prints to local theaters in neighboring cities in the eastern and midwestern United States. Beginning in July 1972 longtime reissue distributor Favorite Films, headed by Newton Jacobs, handled the LBJ release in the western United States.

In the 1980s, WPIX and its then-owner, Tribune Broadcasting, leased the film to The Samuel Goldwyn Company. The Samuel Goldwyn Company's select holdings (particularly the non-Samuel Goldwyn-produced films) ultimately became part of the Orion Pictures library. Finally, Orion became a division of Metro-Goldwyn-Mayer, thus after nearly eight decades, bringing partial rights full circle. Since 1984, the underlying rights to the film have been the property of WPIX and its successive owners.

In 1991, the complete film was restored and colorized by American Film Technologies for television showings and video release by The Samuel Goldwyn Company. In 2006, the complete print was again restored and colorized by Legend Films, using the latest technology. Although the Legend Films release was advertised under its reissue title, both the color and black-and-white prints featured the original title and opening credits.

== Copyright status ==
The original 79-minute Babes in Toyland is under copyright to Prime TV Inc., whose assets are currently owned by television station WPIX (and its current owners, Mission Broadcasting, and operators Nexstar Media Group), with Metro-Goldwyn-Mayer (under Orion Pictures, which like MGM is now part of Amazon) still handling partial distribution rights of the film, making this one of the few films that were not part of MGM's pre-May 1986 library which Turner Broadcasting System purchased it.

The alternate 1950 version, March of the Wooden Soldiers, carried a copyright notice of 1934 with the claimant listed as Federal Films, then the film's proprietor. The Lippert version has been distributed by many home-movie and home-video companies over the decades, as if it were in the public domain.

== See also ==
- List of Christmas films
- List of films with a 100% rating on Rotten Tomatoes, a film review aggregator website
- Parade of the Wooden Soldiers
