= Penn State University College of Medicine =

Medical school in Hershey, Pennsylvania, US

Penn State College of Medicine
- Type: State-related Graduate Medical
- Established: 1967
- Parent institution: Pennsylvania State University
- Affiliations: Penn State Health Milton S. Hershey Medical Center; Penn State Health Children's Hospital; Penn State Health Medical Group
- President: Neeli Bendapudi
- Dean: Karen Kim, MD
- Postgraduates: 1,004
- Location: Hershey, Pennsylvania, United States; 40.26410°N 76.67703°W
- Website: med.psu.edu

The Pennsylvania State College of Medicine (PSCOM) is the medical school of Pennsylvania State University, a public university system in Pennsylvania. It is located in Hershey near the Penn State Milton S. Hershey Medical Center and Penn State Health Children's Hospital, the medical school's principal affiliate. The medical school includes 26 basic science and clinical departments and a range of clinical programs conducted at its hospital affiliates and numerous ambulatory care sites in the region.

== History ==
In 1963, the M. S. Hershey Foundation offered $50 million to the Pennsylvania State University to establish a medical school and teaching hospital in Hershey, Pennsylvania.

=== Penn State Health ===
Penn State Health was formed in 2014 to consolidate health care providers in the area. In 2015, it acquired St. Joseph Regional Health Network in Berks County from Catholic Health Initiatives.

=== Statistics ===
As of May 2011, the Penn State College of Medicine has graduated 3,907 physicians (M.D.) and 1,004 scientists with Ph.D. or M.S. degrees. The College of Medicine offers degree programs in anatomy, bioengineering, biomedical sciences, bioinformatics and genomics, genetics, immunology and infectious diseases, integrative biosciences, molecular medicine, molecular toxicology, neuroscience, pharmacology, and physiology. Two postdoctoral programs leading to an M.S. degree are offered, namely in Laboratory Animal Medicine, the only such program in Pennsylvania, and Public Health Sciences. Each year, more than 550 resident physicians are trained in medical specialties at the center. Penn State College of Medicine is Unranked in Best Medical Schools: Research and Unranked in Best Medical Schools: Primary Care by U.S. News & World Report.

=== LionCare student-run free clinic ===
Since 2001, the students of the College of Medicine have operated a free clinic for the underserved of Central Pennsylvania. The clinic is called LionCare and is based out of the Bethesda Mission, a homeless shelter, in midtown Harrisburg, PA. It has specialized has clinics for Women's Health, Orthopedics, Neurology, Psychiatry and Dermatology. The clinic is staffed and serviced by the students of the college, under the supervision of faculty physicians.
