= Irving Female College =

- U.S. National Register of Historic Places
- Pennsylvania state historical marker
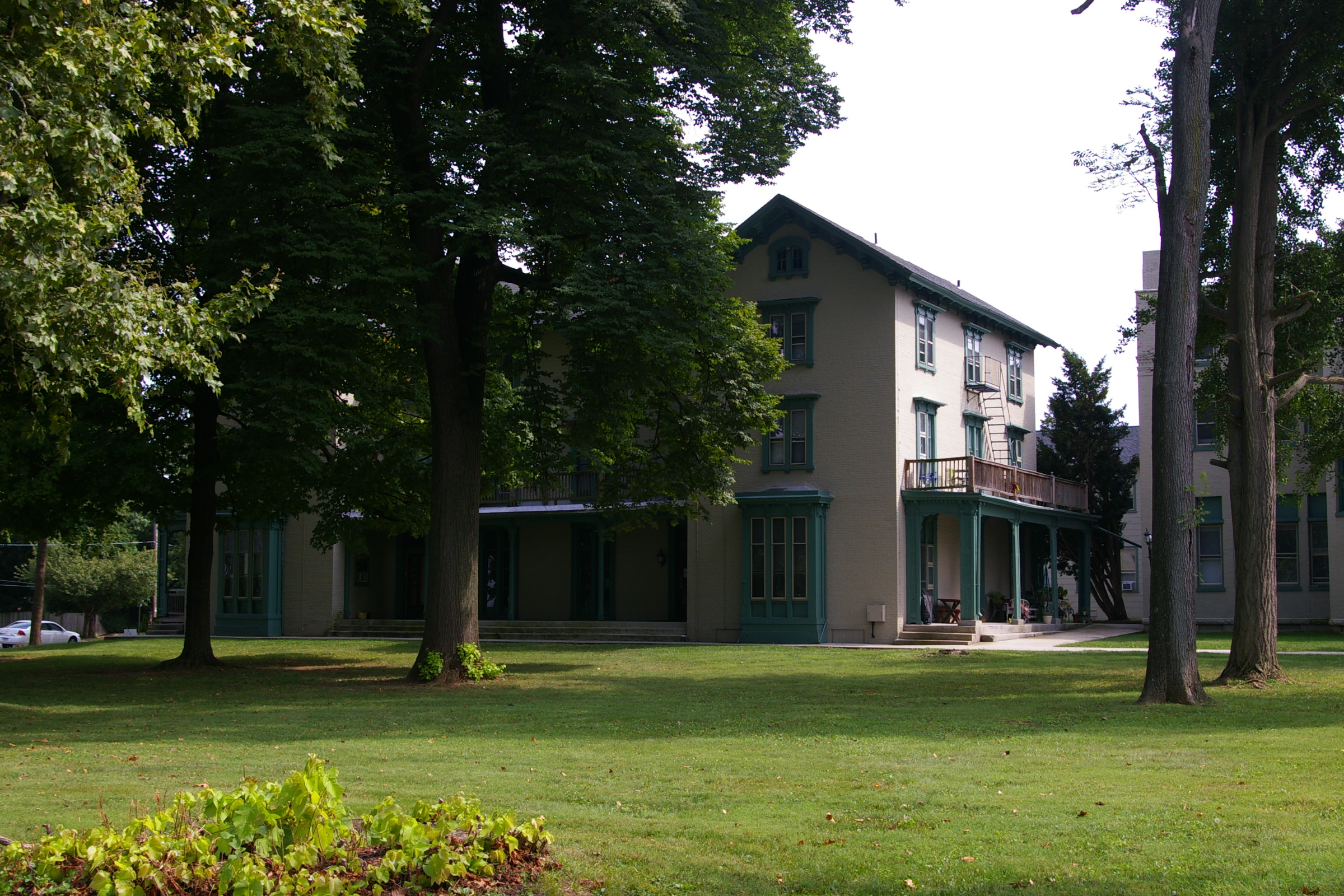
- East (older) building of Irving Female College, September 2013

- Location within Pennsylvania Location within the United States
- Location: Filbert, Main, and Simpson Sts., Mechanicsburg, Pennsylvania
- Coordinates: 40°12′53″N 76°59′59″W
- Area: 4.6 acres (1.9 ha)
- Built: c. 1856, 1893, 1911
- Architectural style: Italianate, Spanish Renaissance
- NRHP reference No.: 83002231

Significant dates
- Added to NRHP: May 6, 1983
- Designated PHMC: September 29, 1954

Irving Female College, also known as Irving Manor Apartments and Seidle Memorial Hospital, is a historic school complex located in Mechanicsburg in Cumberland County, Pennsylvania. The complex consists of two buildings: Irving Hall and Columbian Hall. Irving Hall is the older building, dating from about 1856. It is a three-story, U-shaped brick building with wood trim in the Italianate style. An extension to the building was built about 1900. Columbian Hall, built in 1893, is a three-story, rectangular brick building with a wood-frame addition. It is in a combined Italianate / Spanish Renaissance Revival style. It features a projecting stair tower with a semi-conical roof. Both Irving Hall and Columbian Hall were converted to apartments in the late-1930s. The complex formerly included a third building, known as "Argyle," which was the home of the Irving College president. Built in 1911, it was a rectangular Spanish Renaissance Revival style dwelling, with a low hipped roof and wraparound verandah. "Argyle" was demolished in 1991 to make room for expansion of Seidle Hospital.

The Irving College complex was listed on the National Register of Historic Places in 1983.

== History ==
Irving Female College was established in 1856, at a time when educational opportunities were expanding for women across the United States. Its founder was Mechanicsburg businessman Solomon Gorgas, who named the college in honor of the noted American author Washington Irving. Irving offered a traditional liberal arts education, culminating in either a Bachelor of Arts or a less rigorous "Mistress of English Literature" degree. Like many women's colleges of the era, Irving ran preparatory classes for those who could not meet the academic requirements for admission. Low enrollment and poor management forced a temporary closure of the college in 1883. It reopened in 1888 and prospered under the leadership of E.E. Campbell, who became president in 1891 and purchased the college outright in 1898.

For the next two decades, enrollment stayed consistently at or above 100 – residential, commuting and part-time students. In 1895 the college added a music department and changed its name to Irving College and Conservatory of Music. The curriculum later expanded to include shorter secretarial and home economics courses, to appeal to new career fields opening up to women. Most graduates who found paid employment outside the home gravitated toward teaching. Two of the most notable chose less typical pursuits: Ida Kast, Class of 1892, became the first woman admitted to the practice of law in Cumberland County; Jane Deeter Rippon '02 worked first as a social worker in New York, then rose to be national executive director of the Girl Scouts.

In the 1920s, Irving College suffered from limited financial resources, competition from coeducational schools, and an inability to meet increasingly rigorous standards for higher education. It closed permanently after the 1929 graduation. Alumnae held regular reunions into the 1990s. They donated their collection of college memorabilia to the Joseph T. Simpson Public Library in Mechanicsburg.
