= Karnes (surname) =

Karnes is a surname. Notable people with the surname include:

- Dave Karnes (born 1958), American marine, rescuer of several survivors of the September 11, 2001 attacks
- David Karnes (1948–2020), American politician
- Don Karnes (1902–1982), 1920s American football coach
- Frances A. Karnes (1937–2025), American academic and educator
- Henry Karnes (1812–1840), American soldier and Texas Ranger
- James Ernest Karnes (1889–1966), American World War I soldier
- Jay Karnes (born 1963), American actor
- Joshua Karnes (born 2004), American gymnast
- Karen Karnes (1925–2016), American potter
- Robert Karnes (1917–1979), American film, stage and television actor
