= Isaac's Restaurant & Deli =

Chain of casual restaurants based in Pennsylvania

Isaac's Restaurants
- Company type: Private
- Industry: Restaurants
- Founded: 1983
- Founder: Phil Wenger; Isaac Williams
- Headquarters: Camp Hill, Pennsylvania, United States
- Key people: Mike Weaver, President
- Number of employees: 550 employees (2014 est.)
- Website: isaacsrestaurants.com

Isaac's is a chain of casual restaurants based in Pennsylvania known for its signature line of sandwiches, salads, and wraps named after birds.

Headquartered in Camp Hill, Pennsylvania, the restaurant chain has locations throughout the surrounding region, including Lancaster County, Chester County, Berks County, Dauphin County, York County, and Cumberland County.

The company, which employed 550 people as of 2014, reported approximately $20 million in annual sales that same year.

== History ==
Isaac's was founded by two college friends, Phil Wenger and Isaac Williams, who met as students at Eastern Mennonite University in Virginia. The first Isaac's restaurant opened 44 N. Queen Street in downtown Lancaster in 1983. As a tribute to Wenger's father, Chester Wenger, an avid bird watcher and amateur ornithologist, they incorporated a pink flamingo in their logo and named all of the sandwiches after birds such as 'Mallard' and 'Penguin Club' Vegetarian sandwiches are named after flowers.

In March 2017, the company opened their 19th location (an express model), called "Isaac's on the fly" in downtown York, Pennsylvania.

In February 2019, the company moved their headquarters from Lancaster to Camp Hill, citing lower rent costs.
