= List of hospitals in Harrisburg =

This is a list of notable hospitals and medical centers in the Harrisburg, Pennsylvania, United States metropolitan area.

- Carlisle Regional Medical Center Carlisle
- Community General Osteopathic Hospital Harrisburg
- Fredricksen Outpatient Center Mechanicsburg
- Good Samaritan Hospital Lebanon
- UPMC Harrisburg Harrisburg
- Hamilton Health Center Harrisburg, Steelton
- Harrisburg State Hospital Harrisburg
- Penn State Holy Spirit Camp Hill
- Lebanon VA Medical Center Lebanon
- Penn State Milton S. Hershey Medical Center Hershey
- Polyclinic Medical Center Harrisburg
- Seidle Memorial Hospital Mechanicsburg
- UPMC West Shore Mechanicsburg
- Penn State Hampden Medical Center Mechanicsburg

== See also ==
- List of hospitals in Pennsylvania
