= Polyclinic Medical Center =

- Harrisburg Polyclinic Hospital
- U.S. National Register of Historic Places
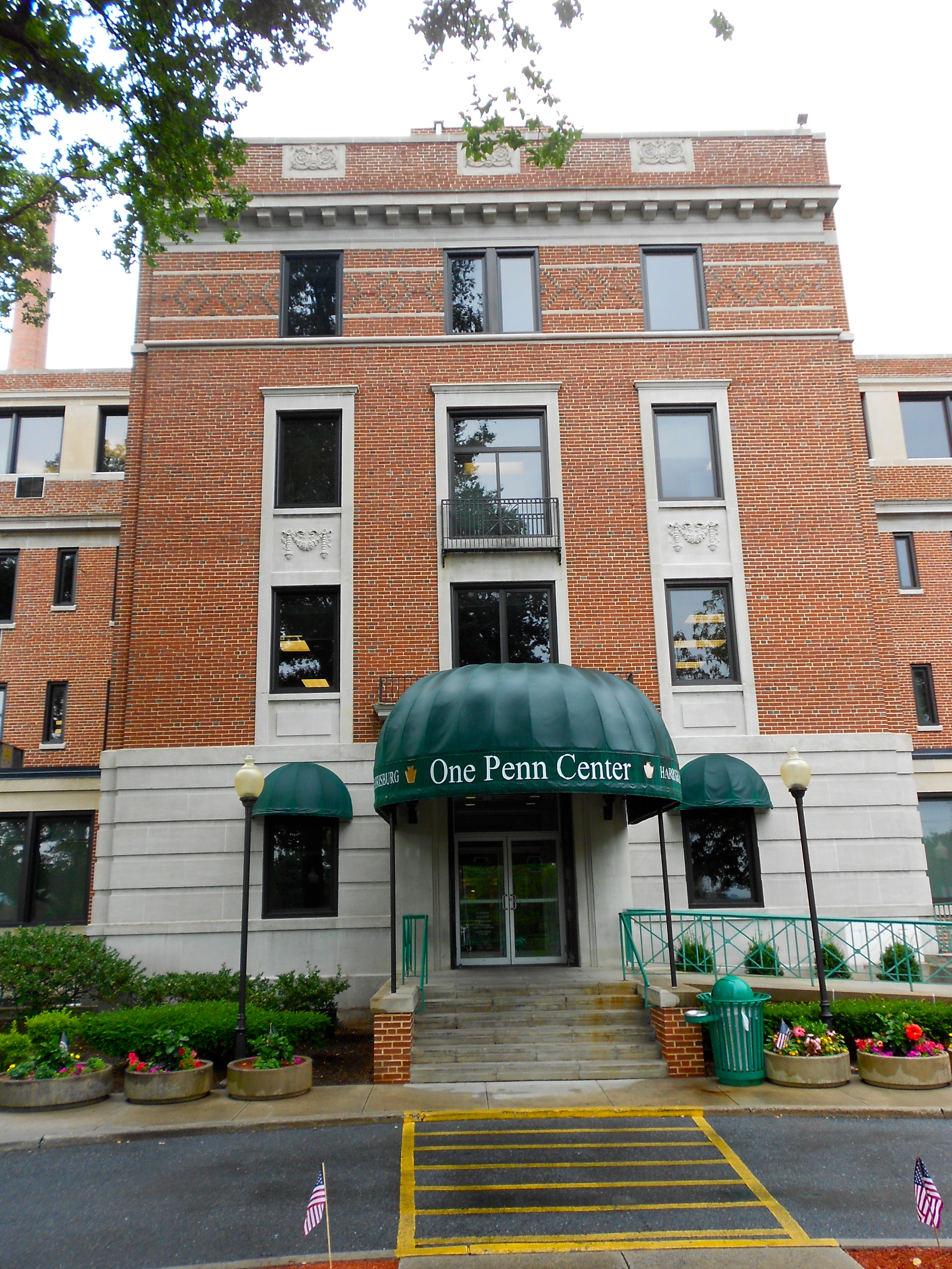
- Polyclinic Medical Center, August 2013

- Location within Pennsylvania Location within the United States
- Location: 2601 N. Third St., Harrisburg, Pennsylvania, U.S.
- Coordinates: 40°17′15″N 76°53′55″W
- Area: 5.5 acres (2.2 ha)
- Built: 1925-26, 1949-52, 1955, 1959, and 1960
- Architect: Kast & Kelker; et al.
- Architectural style: Late 19th and 20th Century Revivals, Colonial Revival
- NRHP reference No.: 04001225
- Added to NRHP: November 12, 2004

Polyclinic Medical Center, also known as Polyclinic Hospital, is a polyclinic in Harrisburg, Pennsylvania, and part of UPMC Pinnacle, a regional system of the University of Pittsburgh Medical Center (UPMC) that serves South Central Pennsylvania.

== History ==
The medical center opened in 1909. Most of the building is occupied by Pennsylvania Psychiatric Institute. On other floors are other programs, including two addiction clinics, physical and occupational therapy, audiology and hearing center, HIV clinic, outpatient laboratory, primary care office, and surgery optimization.

The original building housing the first hospital at this location, dates to 1925–1926, with expansions in 1949–1952, 1955, 1959, and 1960. Its architecture is that of the Colonial Revival period. It was listed on the National Register of Historic Places in 2004.

== See also ==
- List of hospitals in Harrisburg
