= Stephen Karns =

Stephen P. Karns
- Born: Dallas, Texas, U.S.
- Education: St. Mary's School of Law
- Occupation: Criminal Defense Attorney
- Known for: Military Criminal Defense
- Children: 3
- Website: usmilitarylawyer.com

Stephen P. Karns is a Dallas-based civilian lawyer who specializes in defending U.S. military personnel in criminal cases in the U.S. military legal system. In 2004, Karns represented U.S. Army Reserve intelligence analyst Armin Cruz at the latter's trial for his role in the Abu Ghraib prisoner abuse scandal.
