= UPMC Harrisburg =

- University of Pittsburgh Medical Center
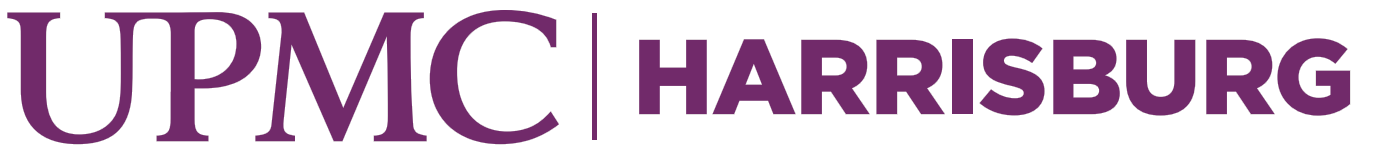

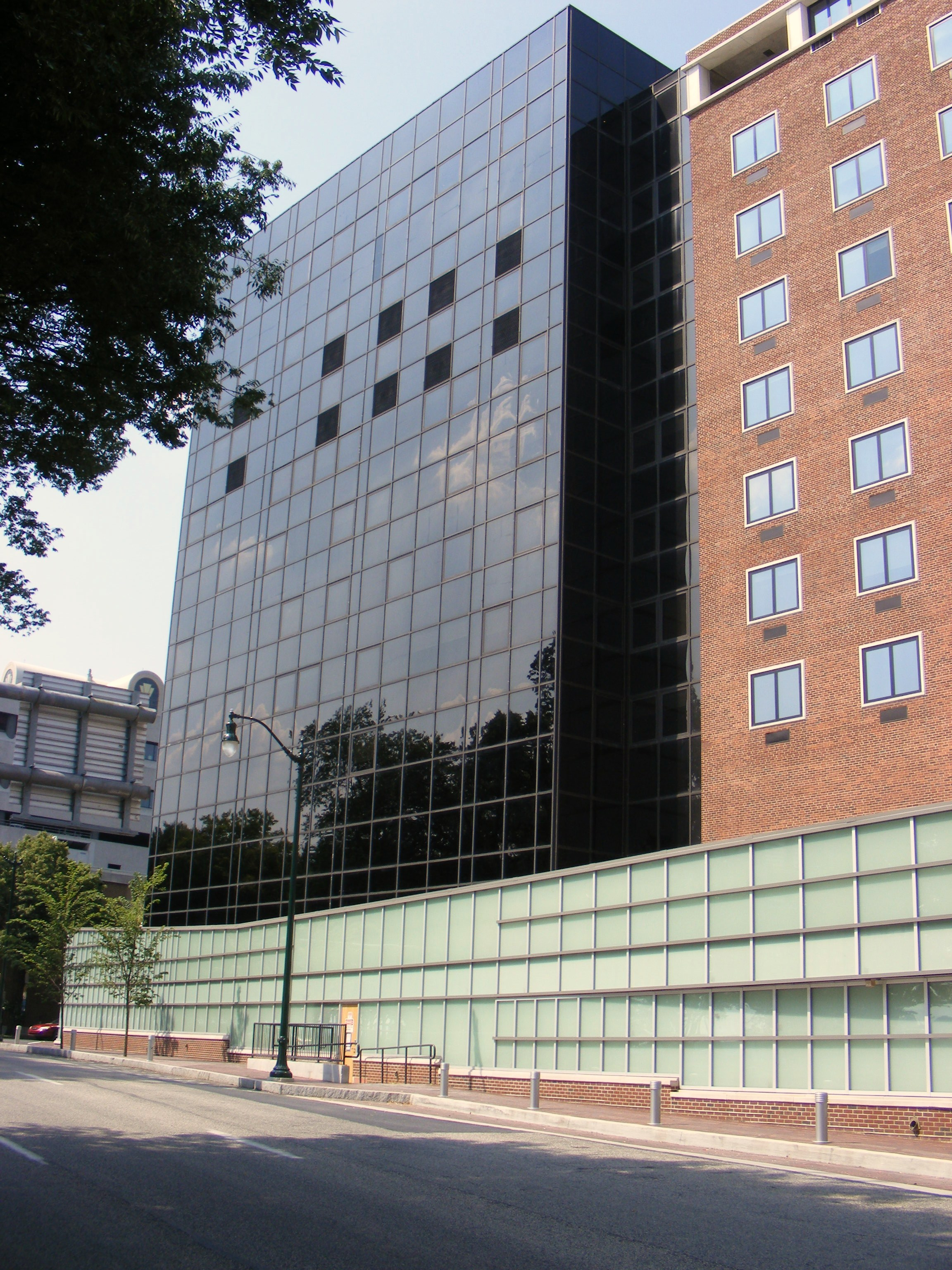
- UPMC Harrisburg

Geography
- Location: 111 South Front Street, Harrisburg, Pennsylvania, United States
- Coordinates: 40°15′29″N 76°52′48″W

Organization
- Type: Teaching
- Affiliated university: University of Pittsburgh School of Medicine

Services
- Emergency department: Acute Care Center
- Beds: 409

Helipads
Number	Length		Surface
Number	ft	m	Surface
5PN9	45 x 45 ft.	14 x 14 m	mats

History
- Former names: UPMC Pinnacle Harrisburg; Harrisburg Hospital

Links
- Website: https://www.upmc.com/locations/hospitals/harrisburg

UPMC Harrisburg is a 409-bed urban hospital in Harrisburg, Pennsylvania and part of the University of Pittsburgh Medical Center (UPMC) system. The hospital serves as the hub for the UPMC network, providing care to the residents throughout southcentral Pennsylvania.

UPMC Harrisburg is a teaching facility providing inpatient and outpatient services. Specialties include women's health, cardiovascular care and orthopedic, stroke, and rehabilitative services. Physician residency programs exist on-site for family practice, internal medicine, emergency medicine, obstetrics and gynecology, orthopedic surgery, and general surgery.

In November 2020 UPMC announced the opening of the new pediatric unit at UPMC Harrisburg. The new unit was opened in partnership with the UPMC Children's Hospital of Pittsburgh and consist of 26-pediatric-beds. The unit treats infants, children, teens, and young adults age 0-21. The unit is named "UPMC Children’s Harrisburg" and features telemedicine connections to the main hospital in Pittsburgh.

In May 2021 UPMC announced the renaming of UPMC Pinnacle Harrisburg to UPMC Harrisburg, effective May 24.

== See also ==
- List of hospitals in Harrisburg
