= Penn State Holy Spirit =

Penn State Health Holy Spirit Medical Center
- Sisters of Christian Charity
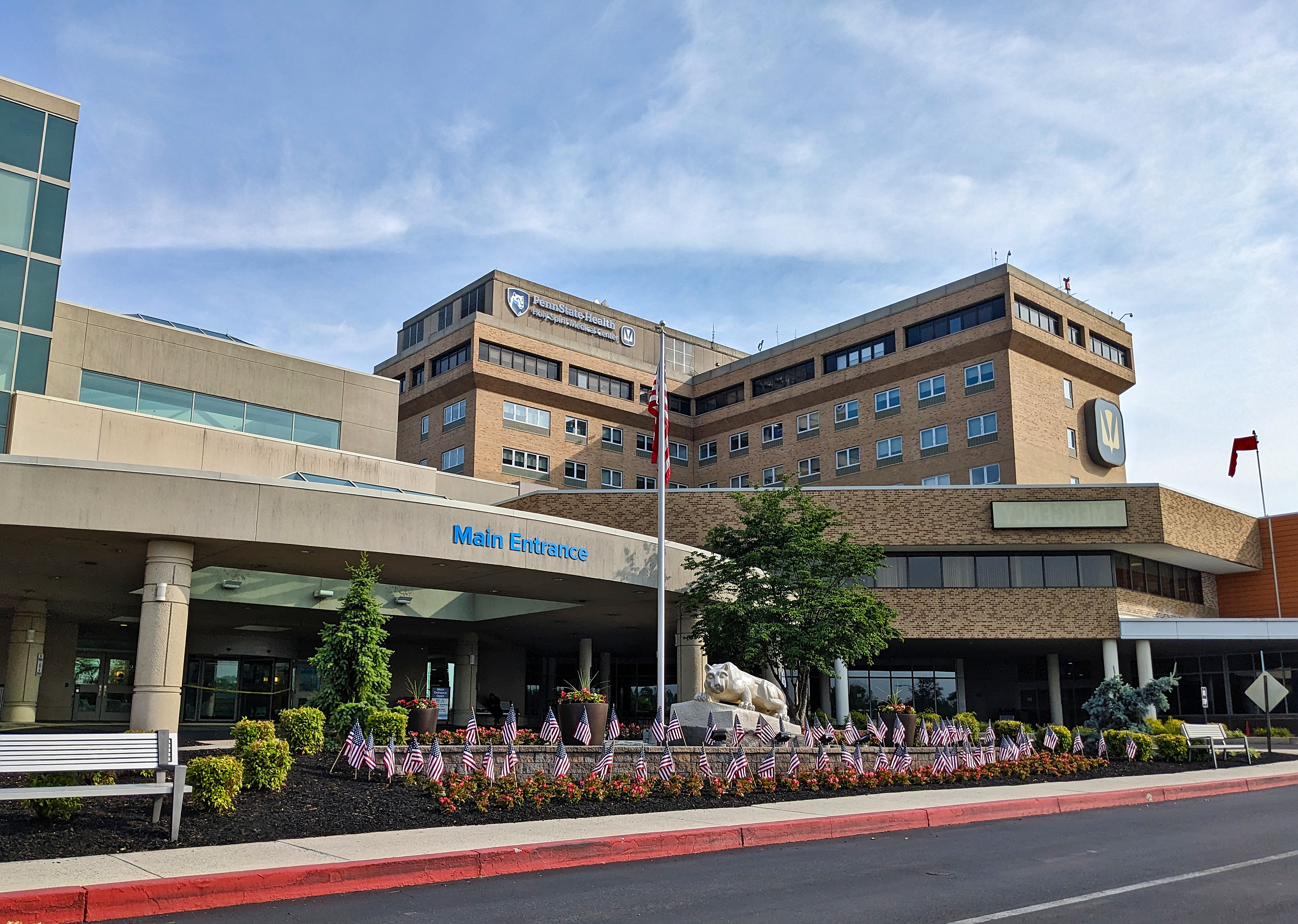
- Penn State Health Holy Spirit Medical Center main entrance

Geography
- Location: Camp Hill, Pennsylvania, United States
- Coordinates: 40.253290°N 76.921877°W

Organization
- Care system: Private
- Funding: Non-profit hospital
- Type: General
- Affiliated university: Penn State Health

Services
- Emergency department: Level II trauma center
- Beds: 311

Helipads
- Helipad: Yes

History
- Opened: 1963

Links
- Website: https://www.pennstatehealth.org/locations/holy-spirit-medical-center
- Lists: Hospitals in Pennsylvania

Penn State Health Holy Spirit Medical Center is a 307-bed non-profit Catholic community hospital located in Camp Hill, Pennsylvania, a suburb of Harrisburg, Pennsylvania, and serves as the primary facility for its related health system.

== History ==
The hospital was founded in 1963 and is sponsored by the Sisters of Christian Charity.

In 2003, the hospital opened the Ortenzio Heart Center, a four-story, 140,000-square-foot (13,000 m^{2}) facility located adjacent to the hospital specializing in the diagnosis and treatment of heart problems.

Holy Spirit Health System, provides comprehensive inpatient and outpatient services and includes a regional network of six family health centers, one internal medicine office, a pediatric practice and two women's health centers. The health system employs over 550 physicians in a variety of specialties to include women's health, cardiovascular care and orthopedic, stroke, and rehabilitative services. Holy Spirit is a Level III Neonatal intensive-care unit. Physician residency programs, affiliated with Memorial Hospital in York, Pennsylvania, exist on-site for emergency medicine and surgery.

On September 9, 2013, Holy Spirit Health System signed a letter of intent with Geisinger Health System, On September 1, 2017, Geisinger Holy Spirit was granted Level II Trauma Center accreditation by the Pennsylvania Trauma Systems Foundation. Geisinger Holy Spirit was formerly called Holy Spirit Hospital. The hospital's name was changed as part of a rebranding campaign in 2017.

On November 1, 2020, Holy Spirit was acquired by Penn State Health, including its medical group and ambulance service.

== See also ==
- List of hospitals in Harrisburg
