= JPL (Integrated Communications, Inc.) =

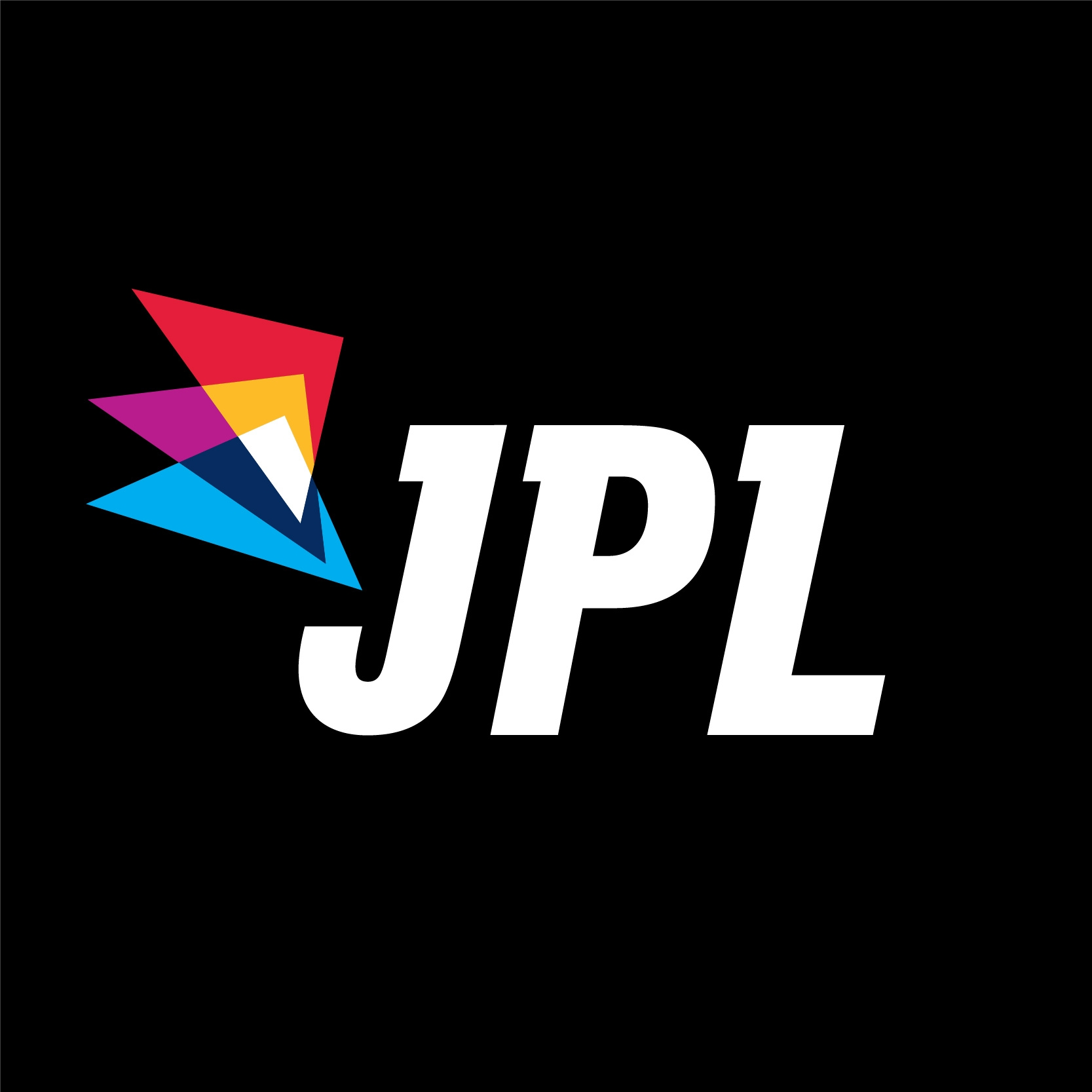
- Company type: Private
- Industry: Advertising and Marketing Communications
- Founded: Harrisburg, PA, U.S. (1989)
- Founder: Michael Horgan, Christian Masters
- Key people: Luke Kempski (President)
- Services: Brand Strategy, Integrated Marketing, Digital Marketing, Web Development, Video Production, Live Events, Internal Communications
- Number of employees: 100+
- Website: jpl.agency

JPL (JPL Integrated Communications, Inc.) is a company, based in Harrisburg, Pennsylvania. The company offers services such as: branding, marketing, meeting and event production and coordination, web development, video production, and internal communications.

== History ==
JPL (formerly JPL Video Productions and then JPL Productions) was established in 1989 when co-founders Michael Horgan and Christian Masters purchased the Video Productions Department from J.P. Lilley in Harrisburg. They formed a new company called “JPL Video Productions.” In 1995, JPL established the “Interactive Technologies Group.”

In 2000, they merged with York-based production company, Kennedy/Lee, and brought on board three experienced video professionals. When web development company MarginPoint joined JPL in 2002, the company added web application development and e-Marketing to its list of services. That same year, JPL was named one of the Best Places to Work in Pennsylvania by the Central Penn Business Journal.

In 2004 JPL purchased an 88,000-square-foot (8,200 m^{2}), two-story facility which, housed two video and photography studios. The internal structure of JPL underwent some renovation as well when former JPL President Michael Horgan assumed the new position of Executive Chairman, and former Vice President Luke Kempski stepped up into the role of President. The company also expanded its 3-D graphics, animation, and simulation technologies, and implemented HD video technology for several full-length videos and commercials. The following year(2005), the new building opened for business and the company was selected as one of the 50 Fastest Growing Companies in Pennsylvania by the Central Penn Business Journal.

In 2007, JPL was featured in CNN’s Business 2.0 magazine for encouraging employees to decorate the new building.

In 2008, JPL Productions was named one of the Top 5,000 Fastest Growing Companies in the nation by INC. Magazine. On September 15, 2008, JPL Productions launched its new brand identity and became simply “JPL.” The change was the product of a two-year initiative to position the company as a strategic, integrated communications company rather than a media production house.

In January 2013, JPL acquired web and eLearning development company d’Vinci Interactive, located in Hagerstown, MD. In 2017, d’Vinci Interactive absorbed the learning solutions business of its parent company, JPL. In June 2018, JPL, forms a corporate partnership with Paskill Stapleton & Lord (PS&L), an enrollment marketing firm headquartered near Philadelphia.
