= Virginia Karns =

American actress (1907–1990)

Virginia Karns (May 30, 1907 – June 21, 1990) was a singer and character actress at the Hal Roach Studios in the early 1930s. Fans probably remember her best from the opening scene of the Laurel and Hardy musical comedy Babes in Toyland (1934), in which she portrayed Mother Goose.

She also appeared in films with Thelma Todd, Patsy Kelly, Billy Gilbert, and Charley Chase while working for Hal Roach. Blessed with a beautiful singing voice, she was an accomplished voice-over artist during this period.

Karns married R. William Patterson and hosted a local variety television show in Dayton, Ohio.

== Filmography ==
Year	Title	Role	Notes
1934	Four Parts	Nurse	Short, Uncredited
1934	Soup and Fish	Daughter	Short, Uncredited
1934	Music in Your Hair	Singer, 'Lover Come Back to Me'	Short, Uncredited
1934	Babes in Toyland	Mother Goose	(final film role)
