= Penn State Health Children's Hospital =

- Penn State Health

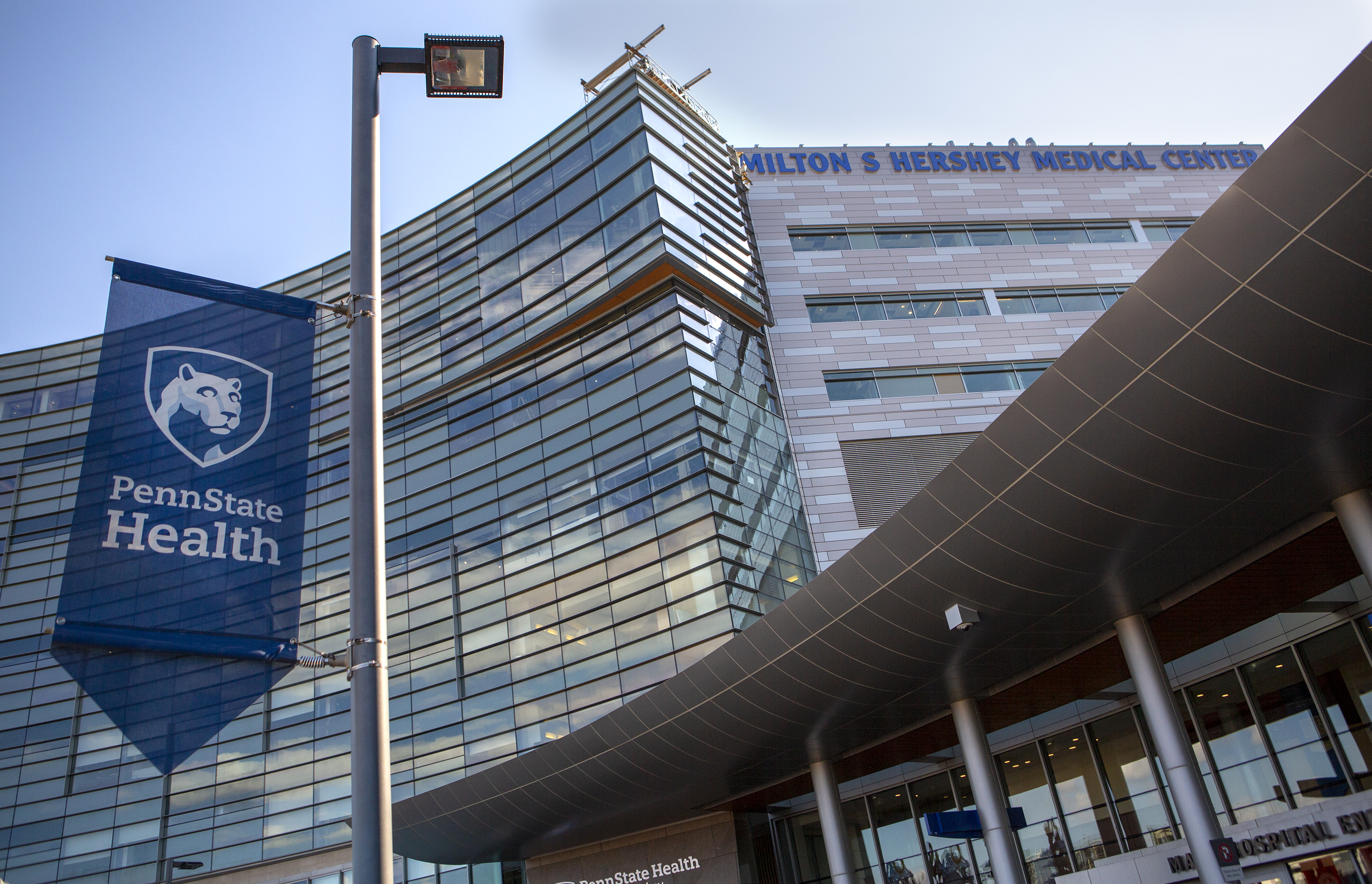
- The entrance to PSCH and the neighboring MHMC.

Geography
- Location: 600 University Drive, Hershey, Pennsylvania, U.S.
- Coordinates: 40°15′51″N 76°40′25″W

Organisation
- Type: Children's hospital
- Affiliated university: Penn State University College of Medicine

Services
- Emergency department: Level 1 Pediatric Trauma Center
- Beds: 134

History
- Constructed: 2009
- Opened: 2012

Links
- Website: www.pennstatehealth.org/childrens
- Lists: Hospitals in U.S.

Penn State Health Children's Hospital (PSCH) is a nationally ranked women's and pediatric acute care teaching hospital located in Hershey, Pennsylvania. The hospital has 134 pediatric beds. PSCH is affiliated with the Penn State College of Medicine and is located at the Milton S. Hershey Medical Center. The hospital provides comprehensive pediatric specialties and subspecialties to infants, children, teens, and young adults aged 0–21 throughout central Pennsylvania and surrounding regions. Penn State Health Children's Hospital also sometimes treats adults that require pediatric care. PSCH also maintains one of Pennsylvania's four Level 1 Pediatric Trauma Centers.

Penn State Health Children's Hospital maintains the region's only Level IV (highest level), state-of-the-art neonatal intensive care unit (NICU) and Level I (highest level) pediatric trauma center. It is staffed by 200 pediatric medical and surgical specialists.

== History ==
Penn State Health Children's Hospital is the sole beneficiary of charity, Four Diamonds which started in 1972 to provide monetary support to childhood cancer patients at PSCH. Four Diamonds is the sole beneficiary of the annual Penn State IFC/Panhellenic Dance Marathon (THON) event at Penn State University's University Park campus. It is the largest student run charity in the world. Since 1977, THON has raised more than $219 million.

In October 2006, Penn State Health Children's Hospital's trauma center was one of the receiving hospitals' for victims of the West Nickel Mines School shooting in Lancaster County, Pennsylvania, treating three of the pediatric victims from the shooting.

Originally, Penn State Health Children's Hospital was housed in a five-story building opened in 2013. In Spring, 2018 Penn State began a $148 million, 126,000-square-foot vertical expansion to the building. In fall 2020 a vertical expansion on the building was completed adding three floors and moving the Women and Babies Center, a 56-bed Level IV neonatal intensive care unit (NICU) and the state's only Small Baby Unit from the former location in the main hospital.

In July 2020, grocery store company, GIANT donated $1 million to the hospital to help support the three-floor expansion, expand the pediatric trauma and injury prevention program, and to expand the "Penn State PRO Wellness Healthy Champions program."

== See also ==
- Penn State College of Medicine
- Penn State Health Milton S. Hershey Medical Center
