= Karns Quality Foods =

Privately owned U.S. supermarket chain

Karns Prime & Fancy Food, Ltd.
- Logo used until 2022

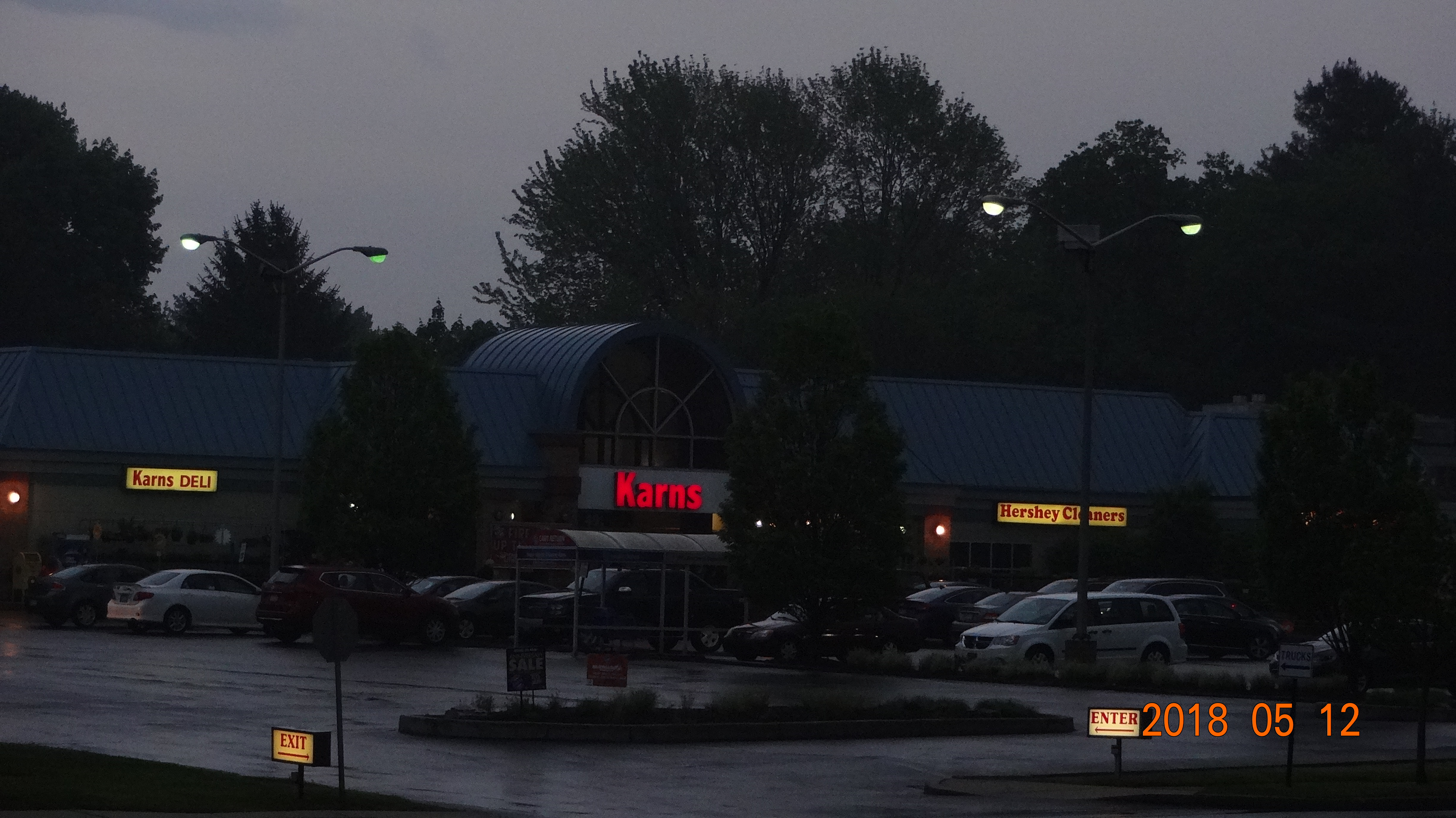
- Karns in Hershey, PA
- Trade name: Karns Fresh Foods
- Formerly: Karns Quality Foods (1959–2022)
- Type: Private, family business
- Industry: Retail (Supermarket)
- Founded: 1959; 67 years ago New Cumberland, Pennsylvania, U.S.
- Founder: David L. Karns
- Headquarters: Mechanicsburg, Pennsylvania, U.S.
- Number of locations: 10 (2023)
- Products: Bakery, delicatessen, dairy, fresh meats and poultry, produce, general merchandise, frozen foods, seafood, snacks
- Owner: Karns Family (100%)
- Website: karnsfoods.com

Karns Prime & Fancy Food, Ltd., doing business as Karns Fresh Foods (known as Karns Quality Foods until 2022), is a privately owned supermarket chain in the Harrisburg metropolitan area of Pennsylvania, United States. The company's corporate headquarters is in Mechanicsburg.

== History ==
Karns Quality Foods was founded in 1959 by David L. Karns and has been operated continuously by the Karns family since then. The company was founded in the form of a butcher shop in New Cumberland, but the current format is a traditional grocery store with an emphasis on perishable items. Karns stores also have a selection of fresh local produce and fresh baked goods. The second store was opened in Hampden Township in 1960.

In September 2006, Karns Quality Foods acquired the remaining store locations of Fox's Markets, a grocery chain that was based in Dauphin County, Pennsylvania. The addition of Fox's locations in Middletown and Hershey gave Karns a total of eight stores. In 2019, the ninth store was opened in the site of a former Darrenkamp's which closed in 2018. In December 2021, a tenth store was opened in Duncannon, previously operated by Mutzabaugh's.

The Central Penn Business Journal ranked Karns Quality Foods as the 35th largest privately held corporation in central Pennsylvania in 2013. In 2009, it was ranked one of the 10 largest privately held companies in Cumberland County.

In 2022, Karns started their own beef business, Karns Beef Program, working with Keystone Farm Future to bring a better selection of beef from local farmers, also working with JBS Foods to provide better availability of the product.

== Operations ==
Karns operates ten stores in central Pennsylvania: Paxtonia, Lemoyne, Mechanicsburg, Boiling Springs, New Bloomfield, Middletown, Carlisle, Yocumtown, New Bloomfield, and Hershey.

Founder David L. Karns stepped down as CEO in 1989 in favor of his son, Scott Karns, who had been involved with the business for 12 years at that point. In May 2024, the company's third generation of family members take lead. Daughter of Scott, Andrea Karns, was promoted CEO. Scott Karns remains as board chairman of the company.

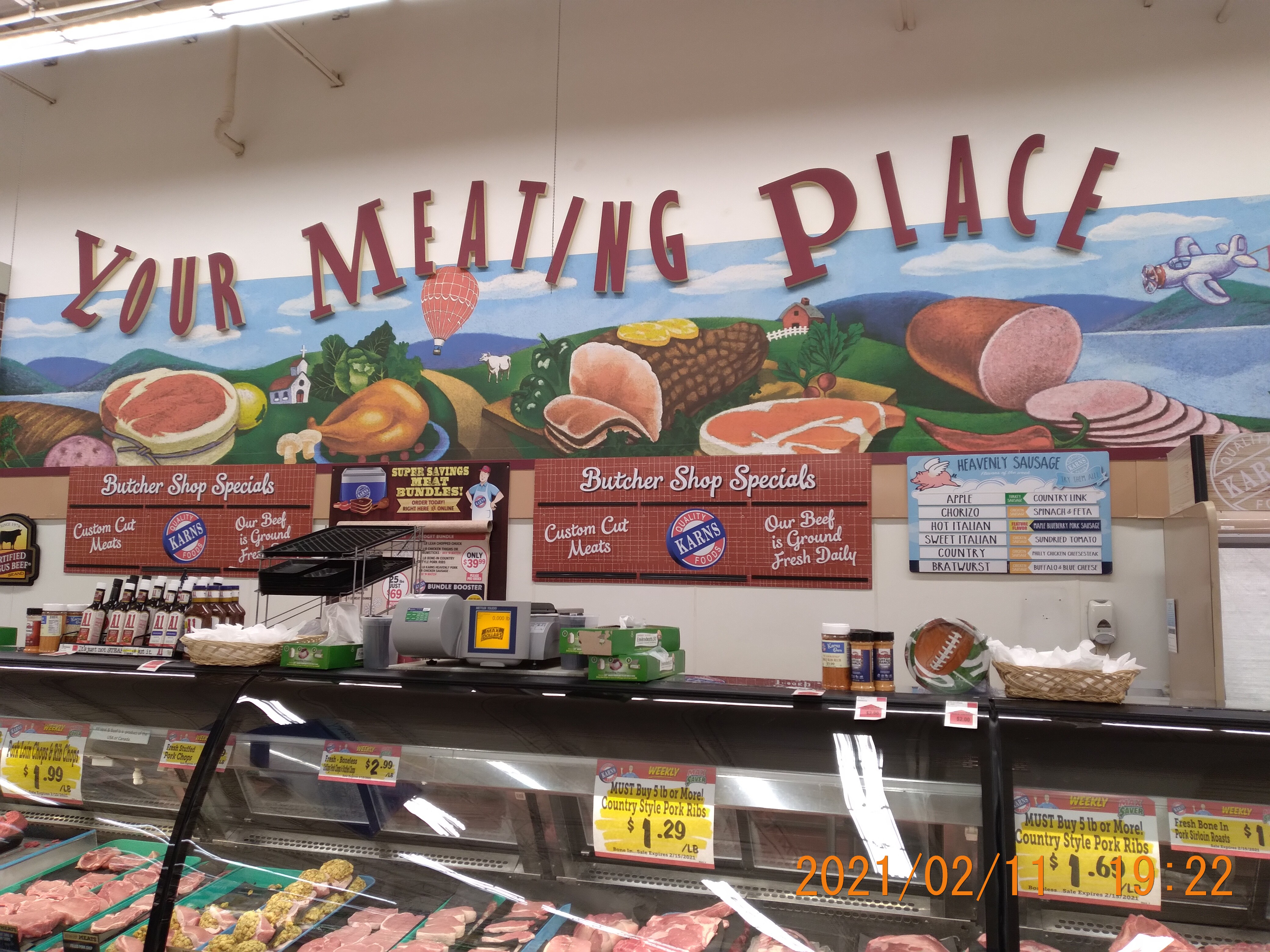
Karns butcher section (Lower Paxton location, 2021)

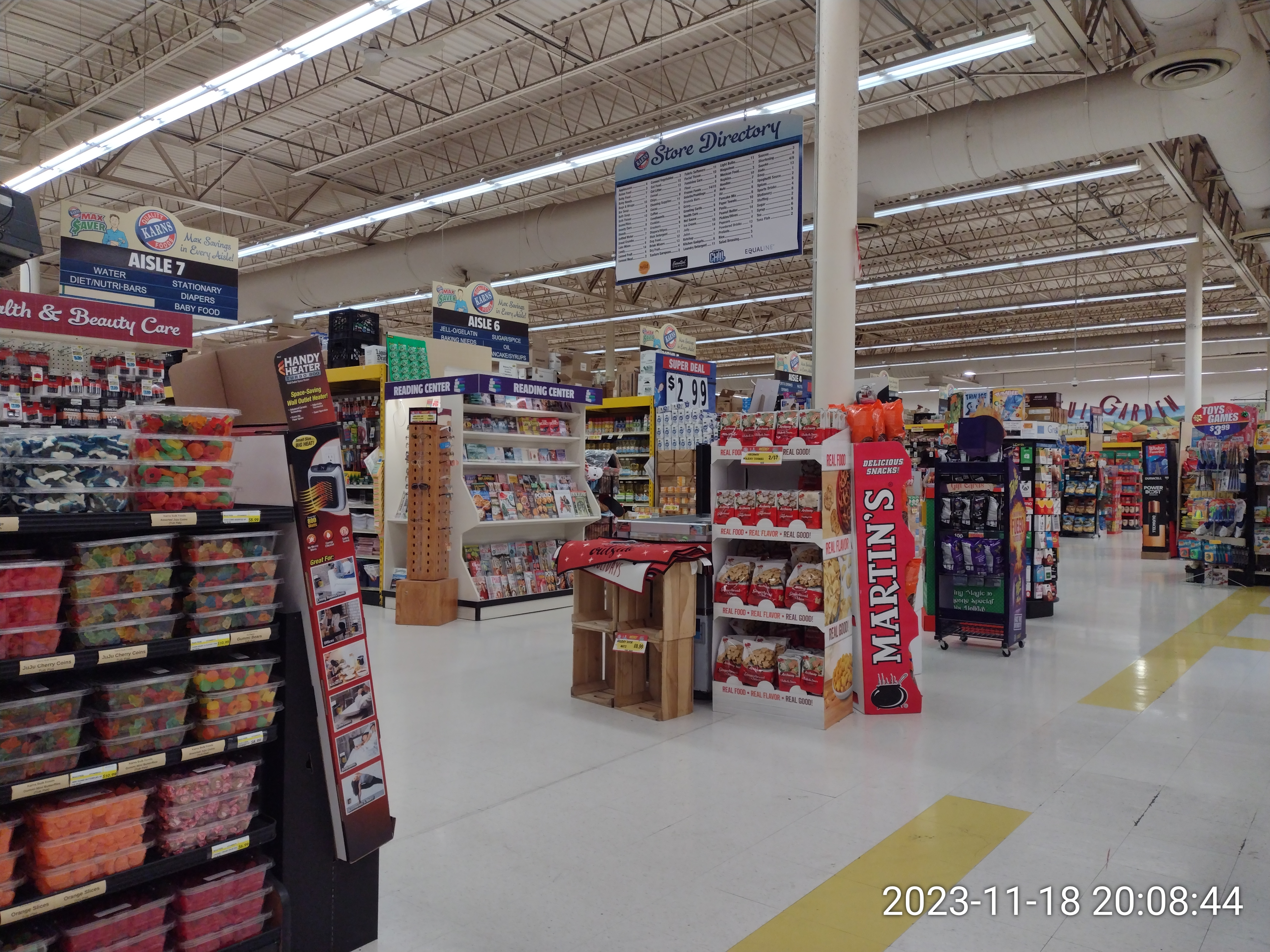
Karns Foods interior, Lower Paxton (Harrisburg area), PA (2023)
