= Penn State Milton S. Hershey Medical Center =

Penn State Health Milton S. Hershey Medical Center
- Penn State Health

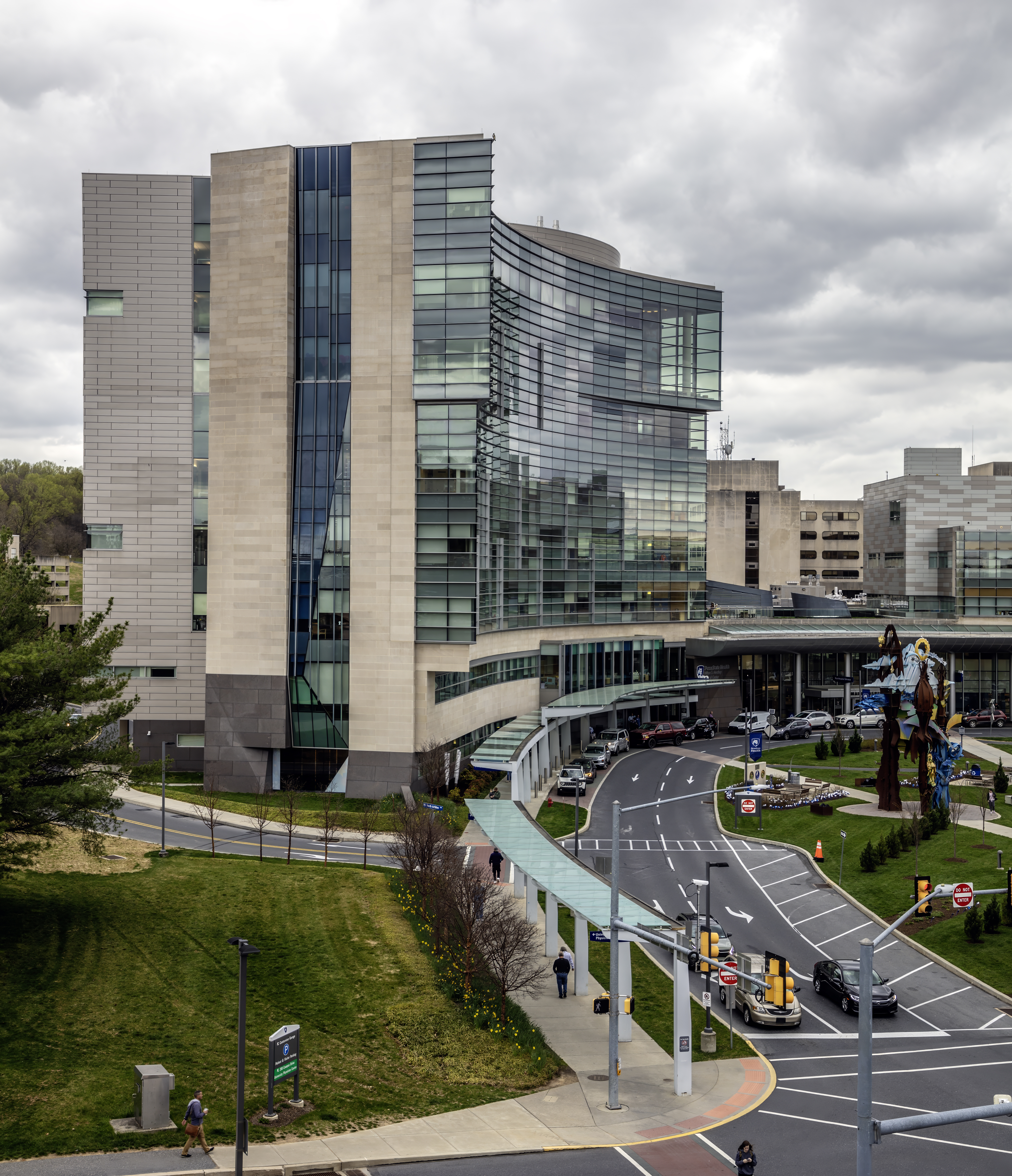
- Hershey Medical Center in 2024

- Location of Milton S. Hershey Medical Center in Pennsylvania

Geography
- Location: Hershey, Pennsylvania, U.S.
- Coordinates: 40°15′53″N 76°40′35″W

Organisation
- Type: Teaching hospital
- Affiliated university: Pennsylvania State University College of Medicine

Services
- Emergency department: Combined Adult Level I / Pediatric Level I Trauma Center
- Beds: 619

Helipads
- Helipad: FAA LID: 64PN; FAA LID: 8PS5
Number	Length		Surface
Number	ft	m	Surface
H1 (64PN)	80	24	Asphalt
H1 (8PS5)	80	24	Concrete

History
- Founded: 1966

Links
- Website: pennstatehealth.org/hmc

Penn State Health Milton S. Hershey Medical Center (MSHMC) is a 619-bed non-profit, tertiary, research and academic medical center headquartered in Hershey, Pennsylvania and serving central Pennsylvania. The hospital is owned by the Penn State Health System and is its largest hospital. MSHMC is affiliated with the Penn State University College of Medicine.

The medical center is an American College of Surgeons-designated level I adult and pediatric trauma center and has a helipad to handle medevac patients. Attached to the medical center is the 122 bed Penn State Children's Hospital, which treats infants, children, adolescents, and young adults up to the age of 21.

== History ==
=== 20th century ===
In 1963, the M. S. Hershey Foundation offered $50 million to the Pennsylvania State University to establish a medical school and teaching hospital in Hershey, Pennsylvania. With this grant and $21.3 million from the U.S. Public Health Service, the university built a medical school, teaching hospital, and research center. Ground was broken in 1966 and Penn State's College of Medicine opened its doors to the first class of students in 1967. Penn State Milton S. Hershey Medical Center accepted its first patients in 1970.

The original buildings at the center included the Medical Science Building and medical center, Animal Research Farm, Laundry and Steam Plant, and University Manor Apartments. Since 1970, the campus has grown from 318 to 550 acres (2.2 km^{2}). Many additions have been made to the academic and patient-care facilities.

The center also serves nursing students from Penn State College of Nursing B.S. degree program and students from other Penn State health-related programs. The extended B.S. degree program for nurses is offered in conjunction with the Ross and Carol Nese College of Nursing. Continuing education programs serve health-care professionals throughout Pennsylvania, with enrollments exceeding 51,000 each year. The center conducts basic and clinical research, supported by more than $100 million in awards from federal, state, and private agencies, businesses, and individuals.

=== 21st century ===
By the end of June 2010, the center admitted nearly 27,000 patients and provided care through over 854,000 outpatient and 57,000 emergency-service visits. Penn State Hershey Medical Center has over 8,801 employees, 400 volunteers, and the College of Medicine enrolls more than 800 students annually.

In late May 2024, the hospital discontinued doing Kidney and Liver transplant due to past problems. Patients were transferred to transplant programs at hospitals in Philadelphia, Lehigh Valley, Baltimore, Harrisburg, Danville PA, York PA, Chambersburg, and Pittsburgh.

== Facilities ==
=== Pennsylvania State University College of Medicine ===
The Pennsylvania State University College of Medicine (PSCOM), known simply as "Penn State College of Medicine" is the medical school of Penn State. While the main Penn State campus is in State College PA, this school is located in Hershey, Pennsylvania in order to align with Penn State Milton S. Hershey Medical Center, the medical school's principal affiliate. The medical school includes 26 basic science and clinical departments and a broad range of clinical programs conducted at its hospital affiliates and numerous ambulatory care sites in the region.

=== Milton S. Hershey Medical Center ===
The Penn State Health Milton S. Hershey Medical Center (MSHMC) is a 628-bed non-profit, research and academic medical center located in Hershey, Pennsylvania, providing tertiary and healthcare needs for the Central Pennsylvania and the capital region. MSHMC is the region's only academic university-level teaching center. The hospital is owned by the Pennsylvania State University Health System and is the largest hospital in the system. MSHMC is affiliated with the Penn State College of Medicine. MSHMC is also a designated level I trauma center and has a helipad to handle medevac patients.

== Penn State Health Children's Hospital ==
The Penn State Health Children's Hospital (PSCH) is a nationally ranked women's and pediatric acute care teaching hospital located in Hershey, Pennsylvania. The hospital has 134 pediatric beds. PSCH is affiliated with the Penn State College of Medicine and is located at the Milton S. Hershey Medical Center. The hospital provides comprehensive pediatric specialties and subspecialties to infants, children, teens, and young adults aged 0–21 throughout central Pennsylvania and surrounding regions. Penn State Children's Hospital also sometimes treats adults that require pediatric care. PSCH also features a Commonwealth of Pennsylvania designated Level 1 Pediatric Trauma Center, one of four in the state.

It maintains the region's only Level IV (highest level) neonatal intensive care unit (NICU) and Level I (highest level) pediatric trauma center. It is staffed by 200 pediatric medical and surgical specialists.

== See also ==
- List of hospitals in Harrisburg
- Medical schools in Pennsylvania
- Penn State Cancer Institute
- Penn State Children's Hospital
