= Central Penn Business Journal =

American business newspaper

- The July 31, 2009 front page of Central Penn Business Journal
- Type: Weekly newspaper
- Format: Berliner
- Owner: New Media Investment Group
- Publisher: David Schankweiler
- Editor: Joel Berg
- Founded: 1984
- Headquarters: 1500 Paxton Street; Harrisburg, Pennsylvania; United States
- Circulation: 10,000 Weekly (as of 2005)
- Website: cpbj.com

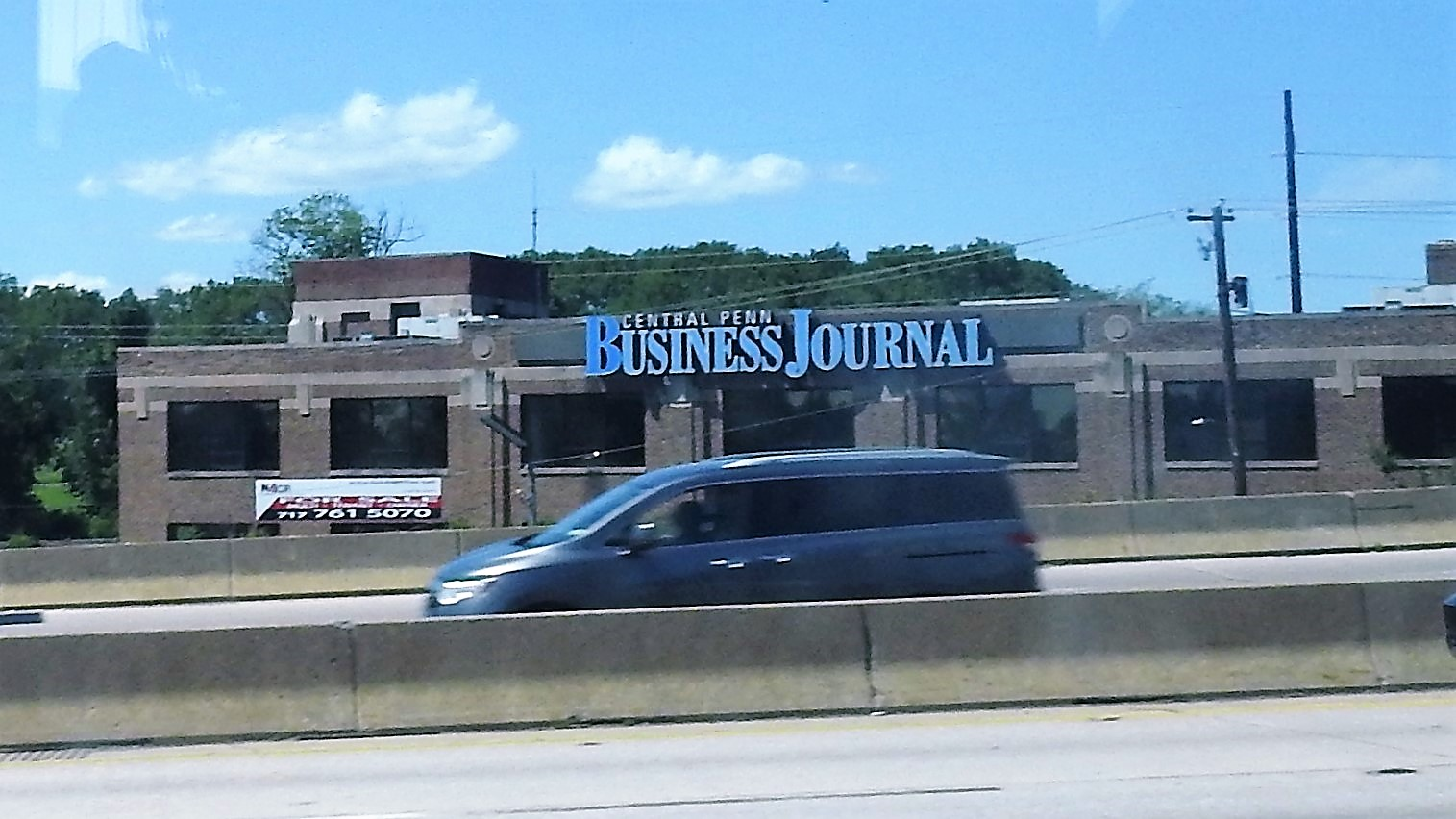
Harrisburg

The Central Penn Business Journal is a business newspaper headquartered in Harrisburg, Pennsylvania. The print publication is circulated on a weekly basis and covers five counties in central Pennsylvania: Cumberland, Dauphin, Lancaster, Lebanon, and York.

It was acquired by New Media Investment Group in 2016. The newspaper has a readership of more than 43,000 in print and tens of thousands more online.

== See also ==
- List of newspapers in Harrisburg
- List of newspapers in Pennsylvania
