= Titanic Museum =

Titanic Museum may refer to:

- RMS Titanic Inc. operates multiple traveling exhibits titled Titanic: The Artifact Exhibition
- Southampton's Titanic Story at SeaCity Museum, Southampton, England
- The Titanic Museum, operated by the Titanic Historical Society in Indian Orchard, Massachusetts
- The Titanic Exhibits at Maritime Museum of the Atlantic in Halifax, Nova Scotia, Canada
- Titanic Museum (Branson, Missouri), attraction museum in Branson, Missouri
- Titanic Museum (Pigeon Forge, Tennessee), attraction museum in Pigeon Forge, Tennessee
- Titanic Belfast, a visitor attraction on the site where the ship was built in Belfast, Northern Ireland
