= List of Titanic museums =

This page is a list of Titanic museums, not memorials, across the world. This list is definitive and should not be considered to be entirely accurate. This list may also feature travelling exhibitions, in which their locations will be updated as necessary.

== North America ==
United States:

- Titanic Museum Attraction in Branson, Missouri
- Titanic Museum Attraction in Pigeon Forge, Tennessee
- Titanic: The Artifact Exhibition in the Luxor Hotel & Casino, Las Vegas, Nevada
- Maritime Museum at Fall River in Fall River, Massachusetts
- Titanic: The Exhibition in Fort Washington, Maryland
- Titanic: The Artifact Exhibition in Orlando, Florida

Canada:

- Maritime Museum of the Atlantic in Halifax, Nova Scotia

== Europe ==
United Kingdom:

- Titanic Belfast in Belfast, Northern Ireland
- White Star Heritage in Okehampton, England
- SeaCity Museum in Southampton, England
- Titanic Story in Southampton, England

Ireland:

- Titanic Experience Cobh in Cobh, Ireland
- Cobh Heritage Center: The Queenstown Story in Cobh, Ireland

France:

- Cité de la Mer in Cherbourg-en-Cotentin, France
- Titanic, l'exposition in Paris, France

Sweden:

- Titanic: The Exhibition in Sundsvall, Sweden

== Oceania ==
Australia:

- Titanic: The Artefact Exhibition: Melbourne Museum in Melbourne, Australia
