= Cooter's Place =

Museum

- Alternative names: Cooter's

General information
- Location: Luray, Virginia; Nashville, Tennessee; and Gatlinburg, Tennessee, 4768 US-211 Luray, VA; 2613B McGavock Pk, Nashville, TN; 177 E Wears Valley Rd Ste 23, Pigeon Forge, TN, United States of America

Website
- https://www.cootersplace.com

Cooter's Place, also known simply as Cooter's, is the collective name of three museums in the United States, exhibiting memorabilia from the American action comedy TV series The Dukes of Hazzard. The museums are named after Cooter Davenport, one of the main characters in the show.

The museums are "operated by none other than ol’ Cooter himself;" that is, Ben Jones.

== Cooter Davenport ==
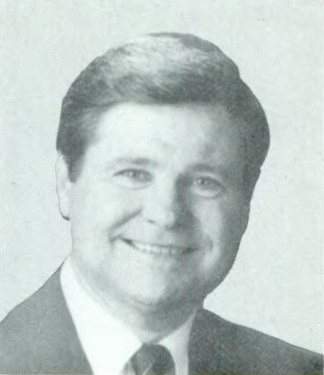
Ben Jones, the actor who played Cooter Davenport in The Dukes of Hazzard

Cooter Davenport, the museum's namesake, is the mechanic of Hazzard County, where the show takes place. At the start of the first season, he is depicted as having an extremely rowdy personality; he disregards the law frequently. This has earned him the CB handle (nickname) "Crazy Cooter".

However, Cooter manages to tone down his wildness by the end of the first season, becoming more easy-going. He owns a garage across from the Hazzard County Sheriffs' Department called "Cooter's Garage".

== The museums ==
=== Gatlinburg, TN ===
Despite being officially known as "Cooter's (Place in) Gatlinburg", this location moved to the neighboring town of Pigeon Forge in 2019 closing the Gatlinburg location.

In addition to the museum and shop, the Gatlinburg location had a mini-golf course and go-karts (Pigeon Forge location is only a Museum and Shop with a couple General Lees and Daisy's Jeep on display). This is where Cooter's Dodge Charger, known as General Lee (car), is exhibited.

=== Luray, VA ===
The Luray location (Moved from Sperryville in 2017) of Cooter's features Daisy's Diner (Daisy Duke is Bo, Luke, Coy, and Vance's attractive cousin on The Dukes of Hazzard), Cooter's tow truck ("the wrecker"), and Cooter's garage with another General Lee, all of which are regular occurrences on the show.

=== Nashville, TN ===
The Nashville location of Cooter's features Cooter's tow truck ("the wrecker"), Daisy's Jeep, Rosco's patrol car, and yet another General Lee.
