= Pigeon Forge Mill =

- U.S. National Register of Historic Places
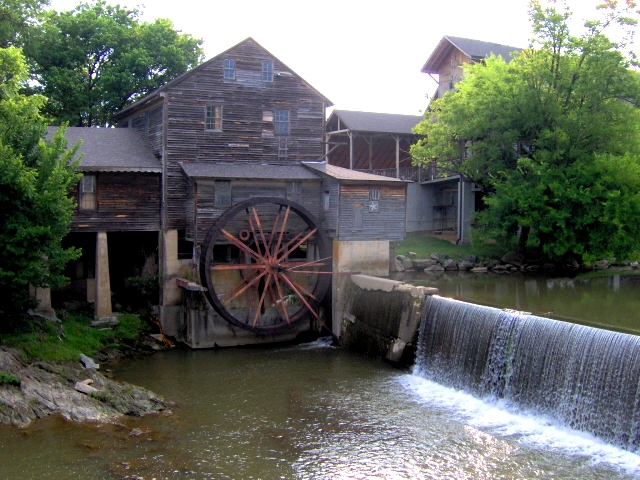
- The Old Mill and milldam

- Location within Tennessee Location within the United States
- Interactive map showing the location of Pigeon Forge Mill
- Location: Off U.S. Route 441
- Nearest city: Pigeon Forge, Tennessee
- Coordinates: 35°47′18″N 83°33′15″W
- Area: Less than 1 acre (0.40 ha)
- Built: 1830 (196 years ago)
- Architect: Isaac Love
- NRHP reference No.: 75001778
- Added to NRHP: June 10, 1975 (51 years ago)

The Pigeon Forge Mill, commonly called the Old Mill, is a historic gristmill in the U.S. city of Pigeon Forge, Tennessee. Located along the West Fork of the Little Pigeon River, the mill complex currently consists of a millhouse, breastshot wheel, and milldam, all of which are operative. The mill is the only structure in Pigeon Forge listed on the National Register of Historic Places.

Now a souvenir shop and restaurant, the Pigeon Forge Mill was once part of a small industrial complex established by local businessman Isaac Love (1783–1854) that included the iron forge for which the city was named. The mill was initially used to grind grain— mainly corn, wheat, and oats— for local farmers. During the U.S. Civil War (1861–1865), the mill powered several looms which produced cloth for the military. In the early 1900s, a generator was installed at the mill which provided electricity to the area until 1930. After the establishment of the Great Smoky Mountains National Park a few miles to the south in 1934, Pigeon Forge gradually evolved into a tourist boom town, and the mill became a popular stop for passing tourists.

== Location ==
The Pigeon Forge Mill is situated on the east bank of the West Fork of the Little Pigeon River, which flows down out of the Great Smoky Mountains to the south and passes through Gatlinburg and Pigeon Forge before joining the Little Pigeon River proper in Sevierville a few miles downstream from the mill. The mill is accessible via Old Mill Avenue, which intersects US 441 (Parkway, Light #7) near the center of Pigeon Forge. A small plaza of shops, known as the Old Mill Square, has developed in the mill's immediate vicinity.

== History ==
Pigeon Forge Mill

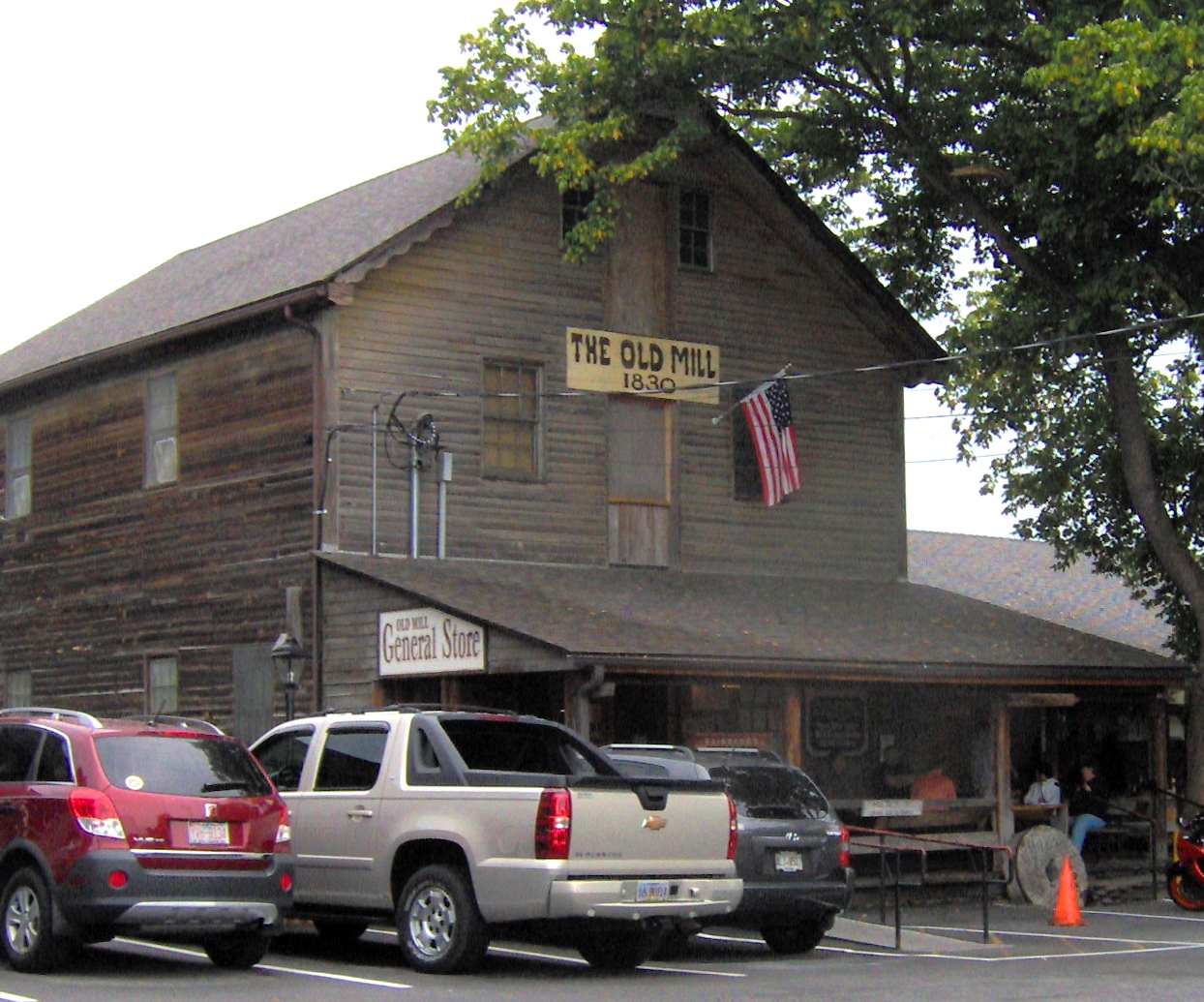
Front facade

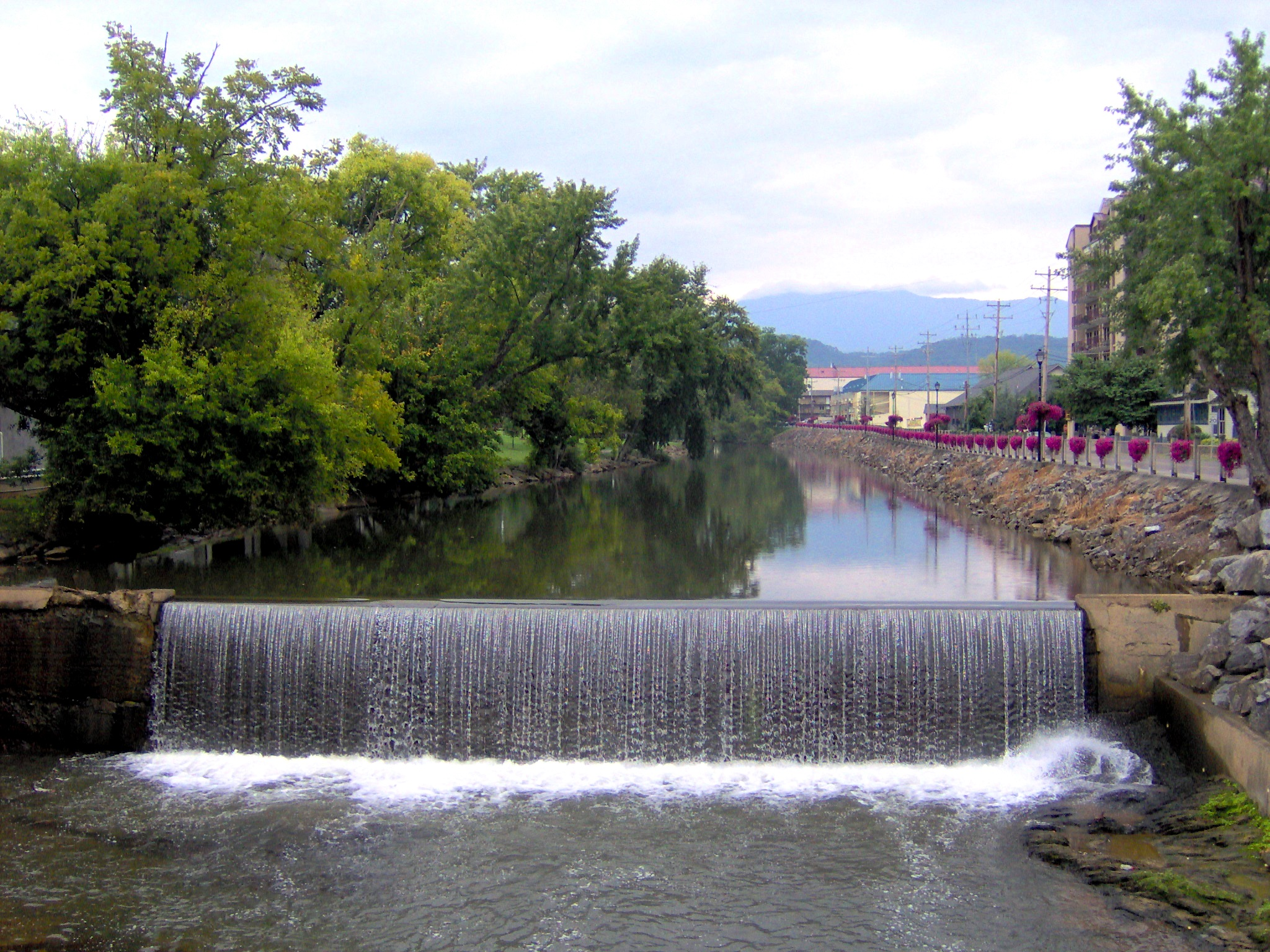
Milldam

The Pigeon Forge Mill is located on land that was originally part of a 151-acre (61 ha) plot of land granted in 1810 to Mordecai Lewis (1751–1817), a Revolutionary War veteran from Virginia. Before his death, Lewis may have erected a tub mill along the river (no longer standing). In 1817, Lewis's son-in-law, Isaac Love, built the iron forge for which the city would eventually be named. Taking advantage of a Tennessee state law that allowed tax incentives for the creation of iron works on unfarmable land, Love acquired over 7,000 acres (2,800 ha) of the surrounding country. Love mined brown hematite ore in the hills northeast of the forge, and transported the ore to the forge using ox-drawn wagons. The forge included a bloomery furnace which converted the ore into pig iron, and a 500-pound (230 kg) trip hammer that molded the pig iron into bar iron.

In 1830, Love and his sons built a large gristmill adjacent to the iron furnace, which was used by local farmers to grind grain. As his iron business was never profitable, Love eventually ceased iron production, and sold the entire operation to Alexander Preston in 1841. On May 29 of that same year, Isaac's son, William, established a post office for the community that had developed around the complex, giving it the name "Pigeon Forge."

Preston operated the Pigeon Forge iron works under the name "Sweden Furnace" until 1849, when he sold the mill and furnace to local businessman John Sevier Trotter (1807–1884). By 1856, Trotter was producing two tons of bar iron annually at the Pigeon Forge furnace. During the U.S. Civil War, Trotter— a Union supporter in a divided region of a Confederate state— secretly installed looms in the mill to furnish uniforms for the Union Army, along with maintaining usual business with locals and even occupying Confederate soldiers (Trotter's son, William, commanded a company for the Union Army at the Battle of Fort Sanders in late 1863). On the third floor, the Old Mill housed a makeshift hospital to treat wounded soldiers from both sides. After the war, Trotter expanded the mill, most notably adding a 60-rpm, 30-horsepower wooden wheel (the current breastshot wheel was a later addition), and establishing a sawmill at the site. Trotter's son, George, dismantled and sold the iron furnace in 1885, but continued operating the mill.

In December 1900, the Pigeon Forge Mill was purchased by local businessman A.T. Householder. Shortly afterward a generator was installed, providing electricity to the string of houses that occupied the river opposite the mill. The current milldam was completed in 1916. The mill was remodeled several times throughout the 20th century by subsequent owners to cater to the tourist traffic along US-441.

== Design ==
The Pigeon Forge Mill is a three-story structure supported by 14-foot (4.3 m) by 14-foot (4.3 m) yellow poplar logs, which in turn rest on several pillars of large river rock (now reinforced by concrete). These pillars have helped preserve the mill through several disastrous floods, most notably floods in 1875 and 1920, both of which washed away bridges at the mill site. The interior of the mill consists of hand-hewn hemlock and oak walls, held together by hickory pegs, and the millhouse's exterior walls have been weatherboarded with yellow poplar boards. The floor consists of nailed pine boards. The elongated section on the north side of the millhouse was built in the latter half of the 19th century to house the mill's new sawmill.

The Pigeon Forge Mill makes use of both the 24-foot (7.3 m) breatshot wheel that characterizes its exterior and several smaller tub wheels. Water is diverted to the wheels via the milldam, which spans the length of the river. The mill uses two two-ton French burr millstones for grinding.

== See also ==
- Clover Hill Mill
