= Little Pigeon River (Tennessee) =

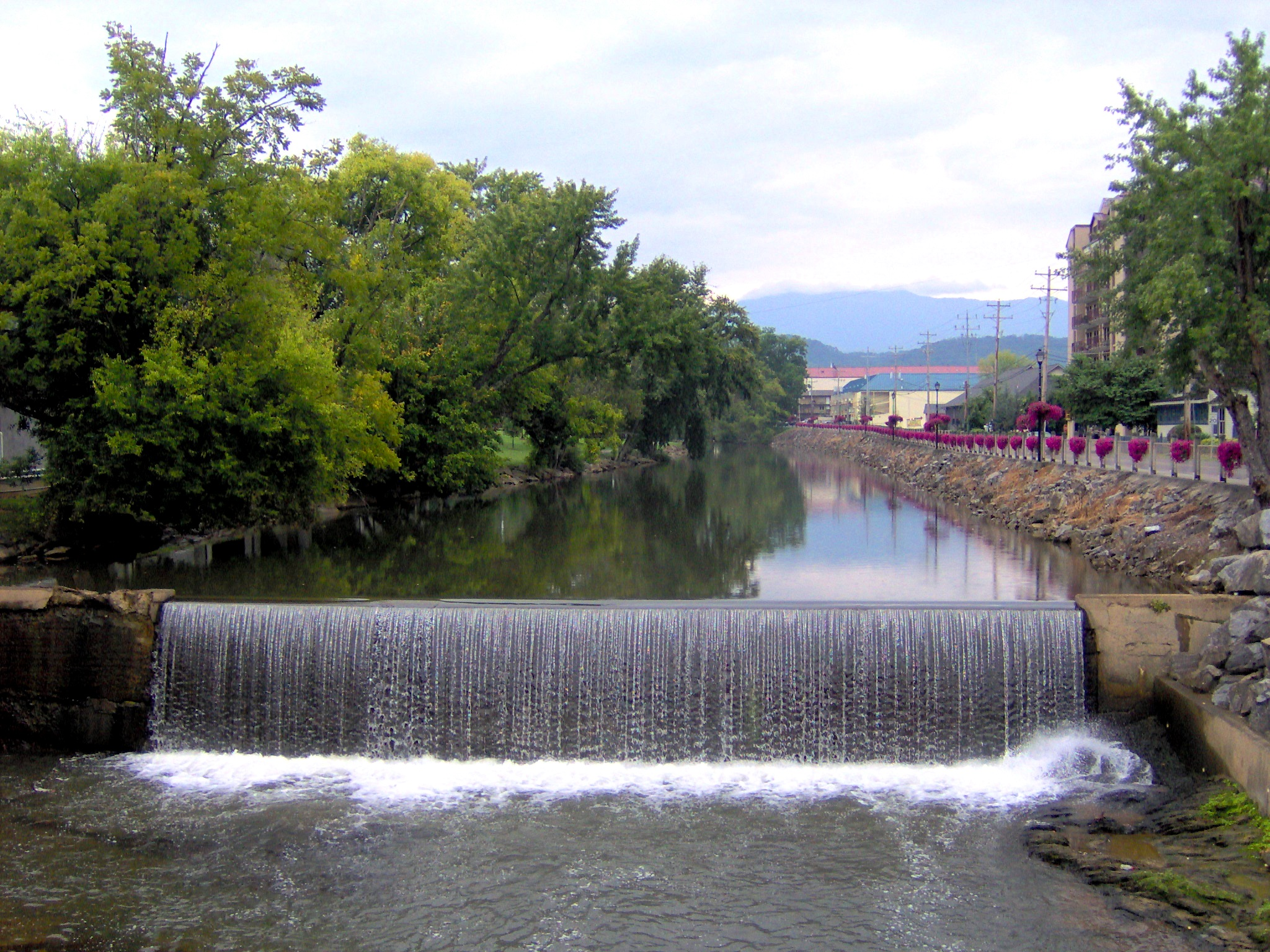
- The mill dam of the Pigeon Forge Mill along the West Prong of the Little Pigeon River in Pigeon Forge, Tennessee. Map shows the Middle Prong and main stem.

Location
- Country: United States
- State: Tennessee

Physical characteristics
- Source: Middle Prong Little Pigeon River
  - location: below Mount Guyot in the Great Smoky Mountains National Park, Tennessee
  - coordinates: 35°41′35″N 83°19′12″W
  - elevation: 3,028 ft (923 m)
- 2nd source: Porters Creek
  - location: near Charlies Bunion in the Great Smoky Mountains National Park, Tennessee
  - coordinates: 35°38′50″N 83°21′47″W
  - elevation: 4,680 ft (1,430 m)
- Source confluence
  - location: Greenbrier Cove in the Great Smoky Mountains National Park, Tennessee
  - coordinates: 35°42′32″N 83°22′57″W
  - elevation: 1,654 ft (504 m)
- Mouth: French Broad River
  - location: near Sevierville, Tennessee
  - coordinates: 35°55′51″N 83°35′43″W
  - elevation: 860 ft (260 m)
- Length: 30 mi (48 km)
- Basin size: 373 mi^{2} (970 km^{2})
- Discharge
  - location: Sevierville, downstream from confluence with West Prong, 4.4 miles (7.1 km) above the mouth(mean for water years 1921–1981)
  - average: 570 cu ft/s (16 m^{3}/s)(mean for water years 1921–1981)
  - minimum: 2.8 cu ft/s (0.079 m^{3}/s)September 1925
  - maximum: 55,000 cu ft/s (1,600 m^{3}/s)February 1875

Basin features
- River system: Tennessee → Ohio → Mississippi

The Little Pigeon River is a river located entirely within Sevier County, Tennessee. It rises from a series of streams which flow together on the dividing ridge between the states of Tennessee and North Carolina, with most of the flow from inside the boundary of the Great Smoky Mountains National Park. The river has three main forks or prongs, East, Middle, and West.

The West and Middle Prongs are the most notable divisions of the river. The Middle Prong emerges from the Greenbrier area of the Great Smoky Mountains National Park and runs through Pittman Center and along State Route 416 to its confluence with the East Fork near U.S. Route 411. It is sometimes identified merely as the Little Pigeon River, not a fork or prong, due to its greater flow (see map). The East Prong, also called the East Fork, is the only major tributary that does not stem from the national park; it is formed by a series of small streams in the foothills of English Mountain draining large portions of the Camp Hollow, Pearl Valley, Ball Hollow, and Jones Cove valleys and running along State Road 339 east of Sevierville. The Harrisburg Covered Bridge is a landmark structure from the 1800s that crosses the East Fork, which enters the Middle Prong at Sevierville. The West Prong is the most recognized fork because it drains the major tourist towns of Gatlinburg and Pigeon Forge. The Old Mill of Pigeon Forge, a working grist mill and dam constructed in 1830 by Isaac Love on the West Prong in downtown Pigeon Forge, is one of the best examples of 19th century hydropower technology, as well as being one of the most photographed mills in America. The Middle and West prongs join at Forks of the River in Sevierville, just west of State Route 66 and just north of US 441. From there the stream continues northward, just west of TN 66, until its confluence with the French Broad River downstream from Douglas Dam.

Despite its name, it is not a tributary of the nearby Pigeon River, which flows into the French Broad well above Douglas Dam and the Douglas Lake reservoir.

== See also ==
- List of rivers of Tennessee
