= Clover Hill Mill =

Historic mill in Maryville, Tennessee, U.S.

- U.S. National Register of Historic Places
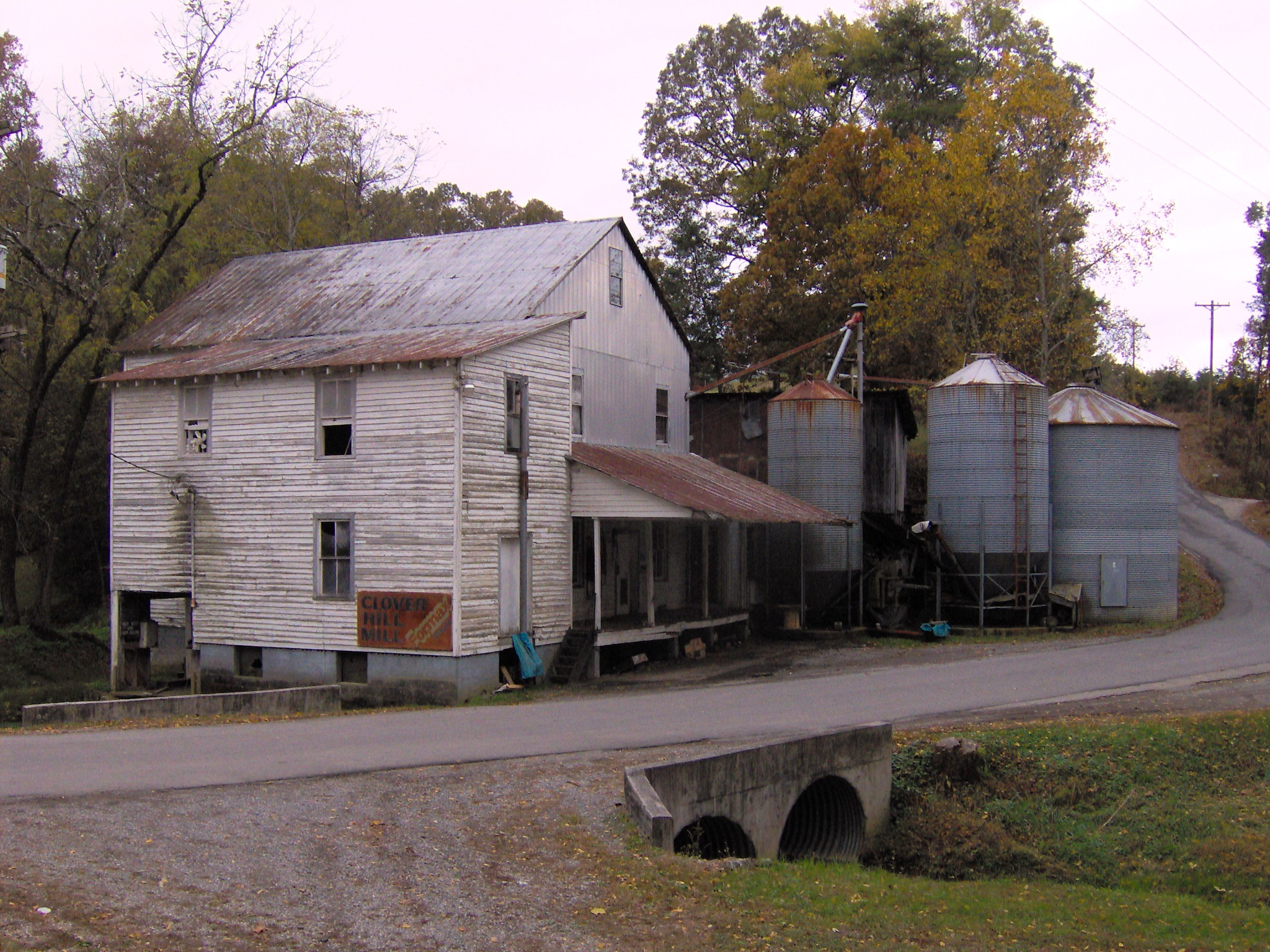
- Clover Hill Mill

- Location within Tennessee Location within the United States
- Location: Junction of Mill Road and Clover Hill Road
- Nearest city: Maryville, Tennessee
- Coordinates: 35°42′15″N 84°3′1″W
- Area: 1.5 acres (0.61 ha)
- Built: 1921
- MPS: Blount County MPS
- NRHP reference No.: 89000871
- Added to NRHP: July 25, 1989

The Clover Hill Mill is a gristmill located in the U.S. city of Maryville, Tennessee. Out of the hundreds of early-20th century mills once scattered across the mountains of East Tennessee, the Clover Hill Mill is one of the few still in operation, and the last such full service mill in Blount County. The mill was added to the National Register of Historic Places in 1989.

The community of Clover Hill was established in the 1820s along the headwaters of Baker Creek, and by 1849 a gristmill had been established around which the community developed. By the 1860s, Clover Hill had its own post office, school, church, distillery, and general store. The completion of a railroad line a few miles to the north in 1906, however, caused the community to shift to what is now called the Binfield community. The gristmill burned in 1921 and was replaced by the present mill that same year.

== Location ==
The Clover Hill Mill is located at the intersection of Clover Hill Mill Road and Clover Hill Road, about halfway between the latter's junction with U.S. Route 411 to the south and Morganton Road to the north. The stream that once provided power to the mill is a headwater stream of Baker Creek, which empties into Tellico Lake near Greenback.

== History ==
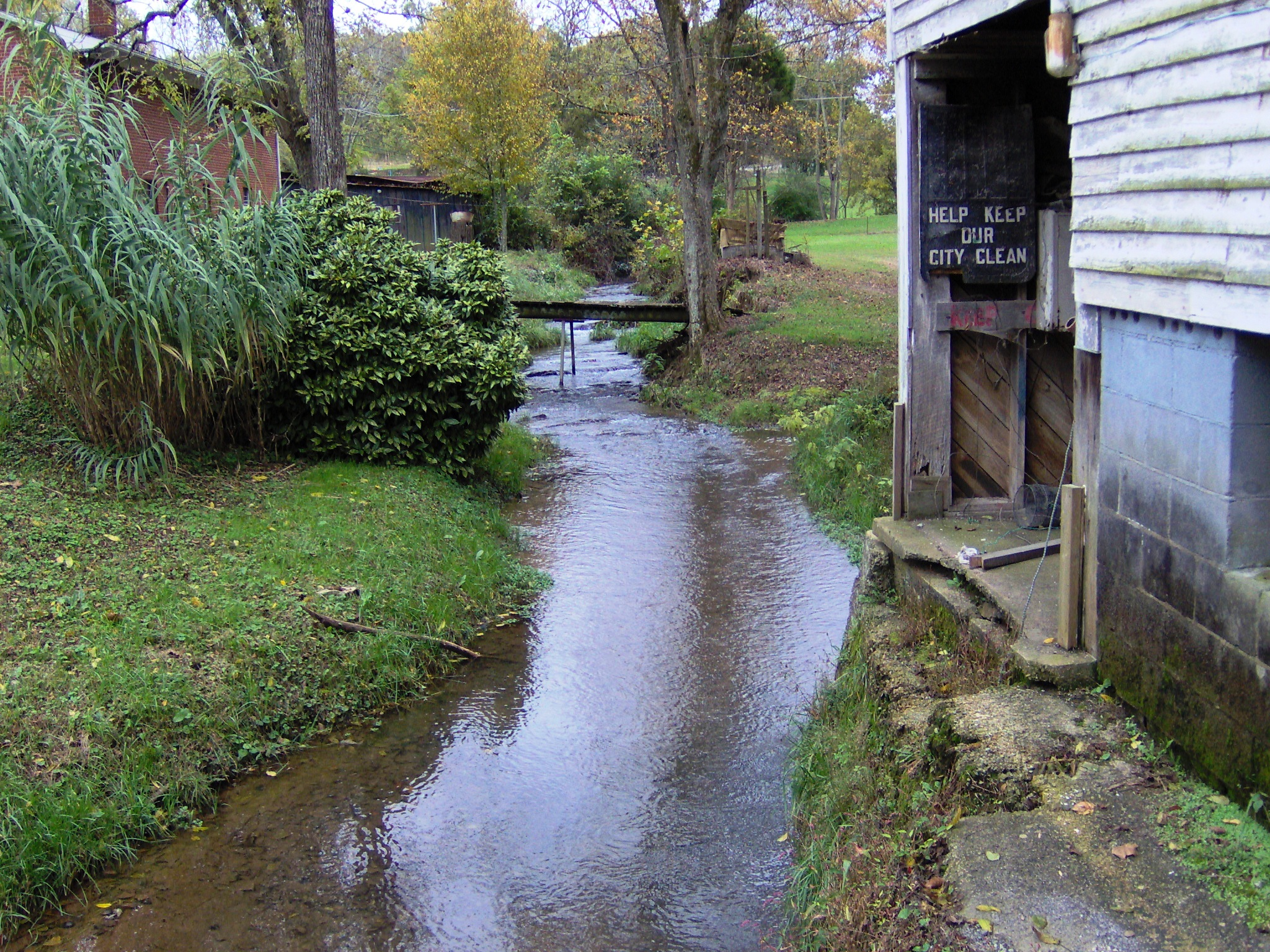
This stream, a tributary of Baker Creek, powered the original Clover Hill Mill; the mill's east wing is visible on the right

Early Blount County settler Abijah Conger arrived at what is now Clover Hill in 1823, and established a tavern and general store that catered to traffic travelling between Maryville and Morganton along the recently built Morganton Road. Conger also planted a large clover farm, and thus when he established a post office in his store, Conger chose the name "Clover Hill." In 1841, another settler named John S. Craig organized what would eventually become the Clover Hill Presbyterian Church. After the Civil War, a physician named Samuel Gault set up a practice at Clover Hill, and served as the community's post master.

A distiller and miller named David McKamey built the first Clover Hill Mill in 1849, which became a center of activity for the Clover Hill community. In 1887, two millers named "Martin" and "West" owned and operated the Clover Hill Mill. After the L&N Railroad completed a line running roughly parallel to Morganton Road a few miles to the north in 1906, a Clover Hill store owner named William Carpenter moved his store to where Clover Hill Road joins Morganton Road in hopes of establishing a railroad stop. Carpenter was appointed post master of the new community, which was named "Binfield," in 1907. In 1915, the Clover Hill post office was discontinued.

After the original Clover Hill Mill burned in 1921, the mill's owner, Gilbert Blankenship, built the present mill on its site. Blankenship powered his new mill with electricity, and abandoned the classic overshot wheel and mill race design of its predecessor. Brothers Russell and Roy Perkins eventually purchased the mill, and in 1958 the mill was sold to Oscar Whitehead. Whitehead's sons, the mill's current owners, assumed operations of the mill from their father in 1978.

== Design ==
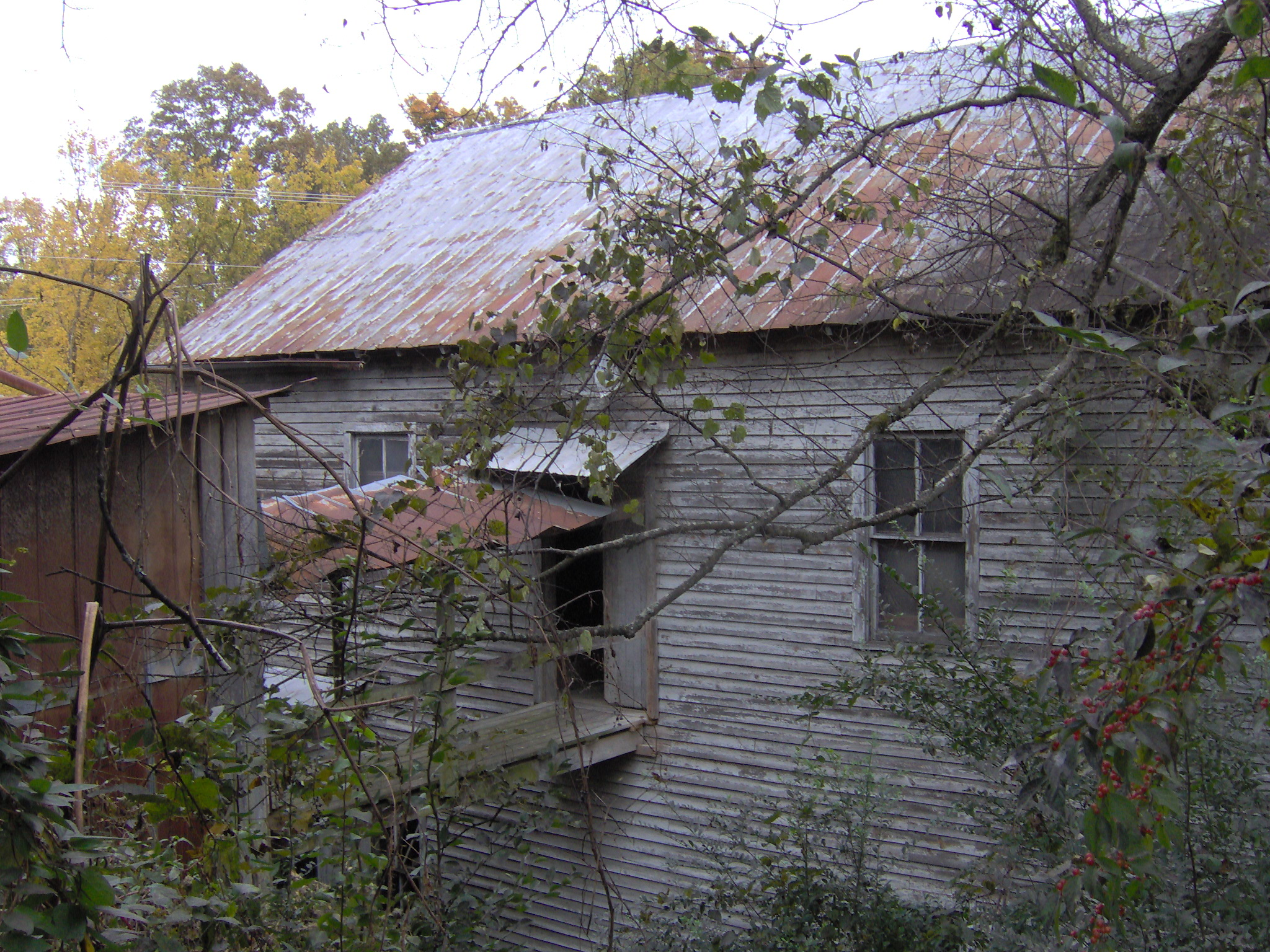
Clover Hill Mill, viewed from the west

The Clover Hill Mill is a 2 1/2-story structure with a metal, gable roof, weatherboard siding, and a concrete foundation. A porch with square columns spans the front of the building. One-story wings are attached to the east and west ends of the structure, which were traditionally used as office space and storage space. The interior of the building retains much of the original mill machinery.

The mill's outbuildings include a frame storage shed, built around 1960, and four metal grain silos, all built between 1969 and 1975. Due to their age, none of these structures are considered "contributing" structures on the National Register listing. The concrete foundation of the original mill's overshot wheel is located behind the present structure.

== See also ==
- Greenback Depot
- Pigeon Forge Mill
