= Tara Thompson =

- Born: Pigeon Forge, Tennessee, U.S.
- Genre: Country
- Occupations: Singer, songwriter
- Instrument: Vocals
- Label: Valory

Tara Thompson is an American country music singer. In 2016, she released one extended play through Big Machine Records's Valory imprint, which includes the single "Someone to Take Your Place".

== Biography ==
Tara Thompson was born in Pigeon Forge, Tennessee. Her grandmother's first cousin is country singer Loretta Lynn. Thompson began singing in her youth, which led to her serving as an opening act for Lynn. Upon reaching adulthood, she moved to Nashville, Tennessee, to begin a country music career. This led to her becoming a regular performer at Tootsie's Orchid Lounge.

In October 2015, Big Machine Records simultaneously signed her to a recording contract with the label's Valory imprint, and a songwriting content with their publishing company Spoon Tunes. The label issued her debut single "Someone to Take Your Place" by year's end. Taste of Country writer Billy Dukes praised the song's "swagger" and thought the verses were detailed. Thompson wrote the song with Leslie Satcher and Alex Kline, the latter of whom also produced it. "Someone to Take Your Place" charted at number 60 on the Billboard Country Airplay charts in May 2016. Also in May 2016, she performed on the Grand Ole Opry for the first time.

The song was included on a five-track extended play of the same name, released a month later. iHeartMedia writer Andy Ellis described Thompson's lyrics as "honest" and "unapologetic", and thought that the project showed Thompson's musical personality despite its short length.

In addition to the release of her single and EP, the television channel CMT included Thompson in their Next Women of Country tour, which promotes up-and-coming women artists in country music. She was dropped from Valory not long afterward. After this, she independently released a Christmas project titled Hillbilly Christmas in 2019.

== Discography ==
Albums

- Someone to Take Your Place (EP) (2016)
- Hillbilly Christmas (2019)

Year	Single	Peak chart positions
Year	Single	US Country Airplay
2016	"Someone to Take Your Place"	60
