= Titanic Belfast =

Visitor attraction in Northern Ireland

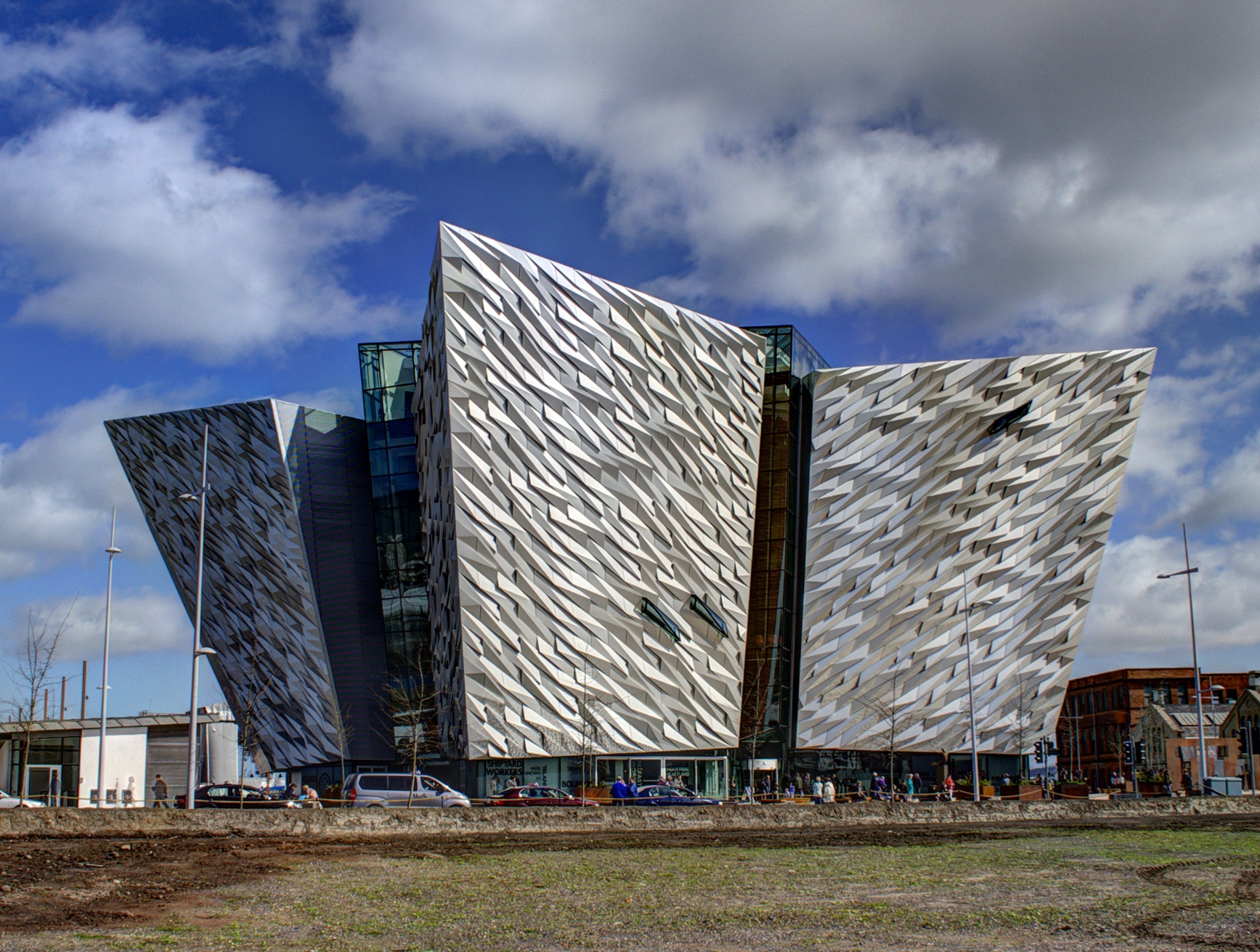
- Titanic Belfast

- Location within Northern Ireland

General information
- Location: Belfast, Northern Ireland
- Coordinates: 54°36′29.97″N 5°54′35.09″W
- Construction started: May 2009
- Opened: 31 March 2012
- Cost: £101 million

Height
- Height: 38.5 m (126 ft)

Design and construction
- Architect: CivicArts / Eric Kuhne and Associates

Website
- http://www.titanicbelfast.com/

Titanic Belfast is a visitor attraction in Belfast, Northern Ireland, which opened in 2012. It is a monument to Belfast's maritime heritage on the site of the former Harland & Wolff shipyard in the city's Titanic Quarter where the RMS Titanic was built. It tells the stories of the Titanic, which hit an iceberg and sank during her maiden voyage in 1912, and her sister ships RMS Olympic and HMHS Britannic. The building contains more than 12,000 square metres (130,000 sq ft) of floor space, most of which is occupied by a series of galleries, private function rooms and community facilities.

== History ==
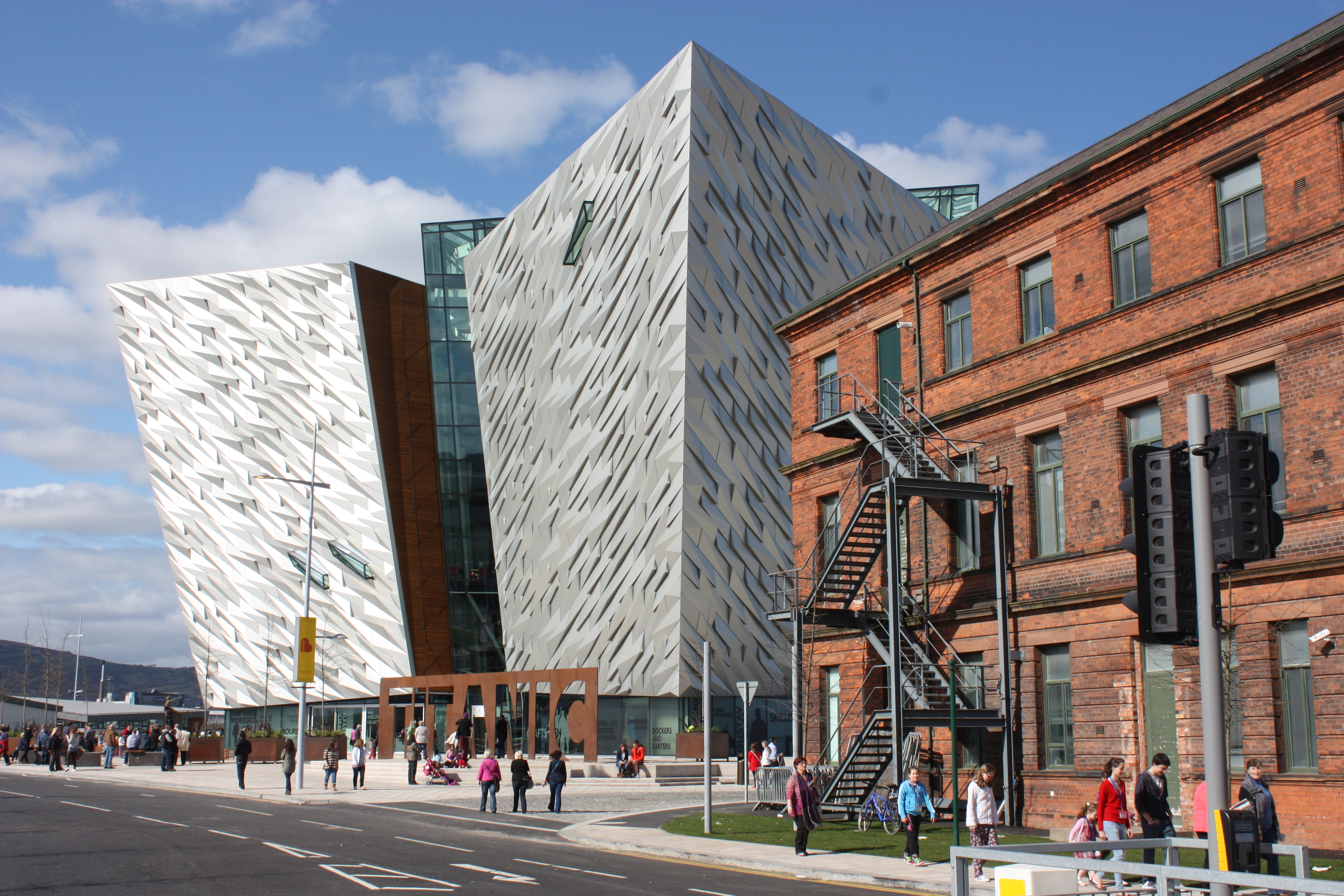
Titanic Belfast seen in context from the front

The building is located on Queen's Island, an area of land at the entrance of Belfast Lough which was reclaimed from the water in the mid-19th century. It was used for many years by the shipbuilders Harland & Wolff, who built huge slipways and graving docks to accommodate the simultaneous construction of the Olympic, Titanic and the Britannic. The decline of shipbuilding in Belfast left much of the area derelict. Most of the disused structures on the island were demolished. A number of heritage features were given listed status, including the Olympic, Titanic, and Britannic slipways and graving docks, as well as the iconic Samson and Goliath cranes.

The derelict land was renamed the "Titanic Quarter" in 2001 and was earmarked for regeneration. Development rights over 185 acres was subsequently bought by Harcourt Developments at a cost of £47 million, with 23 more acres set aside for a science park. The redevelopment plans included houses, hotels and entertainment amenities plus a maritime heritage museum and science centre. In 2005, plans were announced to build a museum dedicated to Titanic to attract tourists to the area, with the aim of completing it by 2012 to mark the centenary of Titanic's maiden voyage and sinking.

Among ideas considered for the attraction were reconstructing the massive Arrol Gantry in which Titanic, Olympic and Britannic were constructed, or building an illuminated wire frame outline of Titanic in the dock in which she was fitted out. In June 2008, details of a project – known then as the "Titanic Signature Project" – were announced. Northern Ireland's Tourism Minister, Arlene Foster, announced that the Northern Ireland Executive would provide 50 per cent of the attraction's funding through the Northern Ireland Tourist Board, with the remaining 50 per cent coming from the private sector, in the shape of Titanic Quarter Ltd (a sister company of Harcourt Developments) and the Belfast Harbour Commissioners. Additional funding was pledged by Belfast City Council.

The task of creating the visitor attraction was taken on by Harcourt Developments, who enlisted the help of the American architect Eric Kuhne and British exhibition designers Event Communications. The building, now known as Titanic Belfast, was expected to attract 425,000 visitors annually, of whom between 130,000 and 165,000 would come from outside Northern Ireland. It is intended to serve a similar transformational function to that of the Guggenheim Museum Bilbao, designed by Frank Gehry, as a focus for the regeneration of the city. It forms part of the Titanic–related heritage sites in Titanic Quarter, including the disused headquarters and drawing offices of Harland & Wolff, the SS Nomadic – the last surviving White Star Line ship – and Hamilton Dock, Titanic's Dock and Pump house and the Titanic Olympic and Britannic slipways.

== Tourism ==
First year visitor numbers significantly exceeded projections, with 807,340 visitors passing through its doors, of which 471,702 were from outside Northern Ireland, according to Titanic Belfast. The attraction has also sold 1,376 bottles of champagne and hosted over 350 conferences. In 2015, there were 625,000 visitors.

Titanic Belfast had a record-breaking year in 2017/18 with 841,563 people visiting the tourist attraction and the year before saw the Titanic Museum take home the World's Leading Tourism Attraction Award at the World Travel Awards (2016). In the same year, Titanic Belfast saw 84% of its visitors coming from outside Northern Ireland.

It was the most visited tourist attraction in Northern Ireland in 2025 with 953,554 visitors.

The Titanic visitor centre has received fifteen awards since its opening in 2012. Titanic Belfast has been credited for helping to transform tourism in Northern Ireland for the better over the past few years. The tourist attraction has also welcomed many famous visitors including Queen Elizabeth II, the man who discovered the Titanic, Robert Ballard, and OceanGate CEO Stockton Rush.

== Design and construction ==
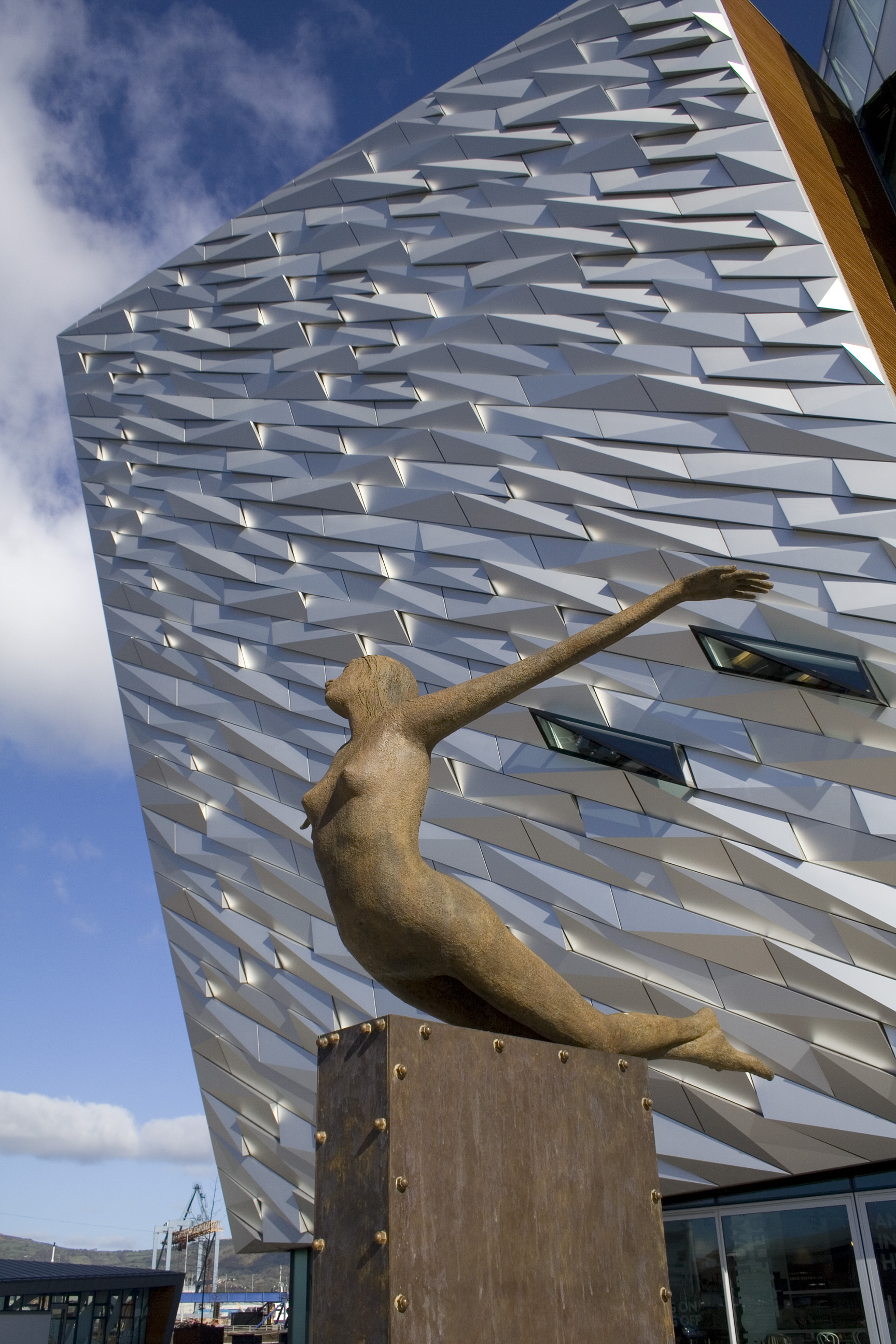
Rowan Gillespie's sculpture Titanica in front of Titanic Belfast

CivicArts / Eric Kuhne and Associates were commissioned as concept architects, with Todd Architects appointed as lead consultants. The building's design is intended to reflect Belfast's history of shipmaking and the industrial legacy bequeathed by Harland & Wolff. Its angular form recalls the shape of ships' prows, with its main "prow" angled down the middle of the Titanic and Olympic slipways towards the River Lagan. Most of the building's façade is clad in 3,000 individual silver anodised aluminium shards. It stands 126 feet (38 m) high, the same height as Titanic's hull.

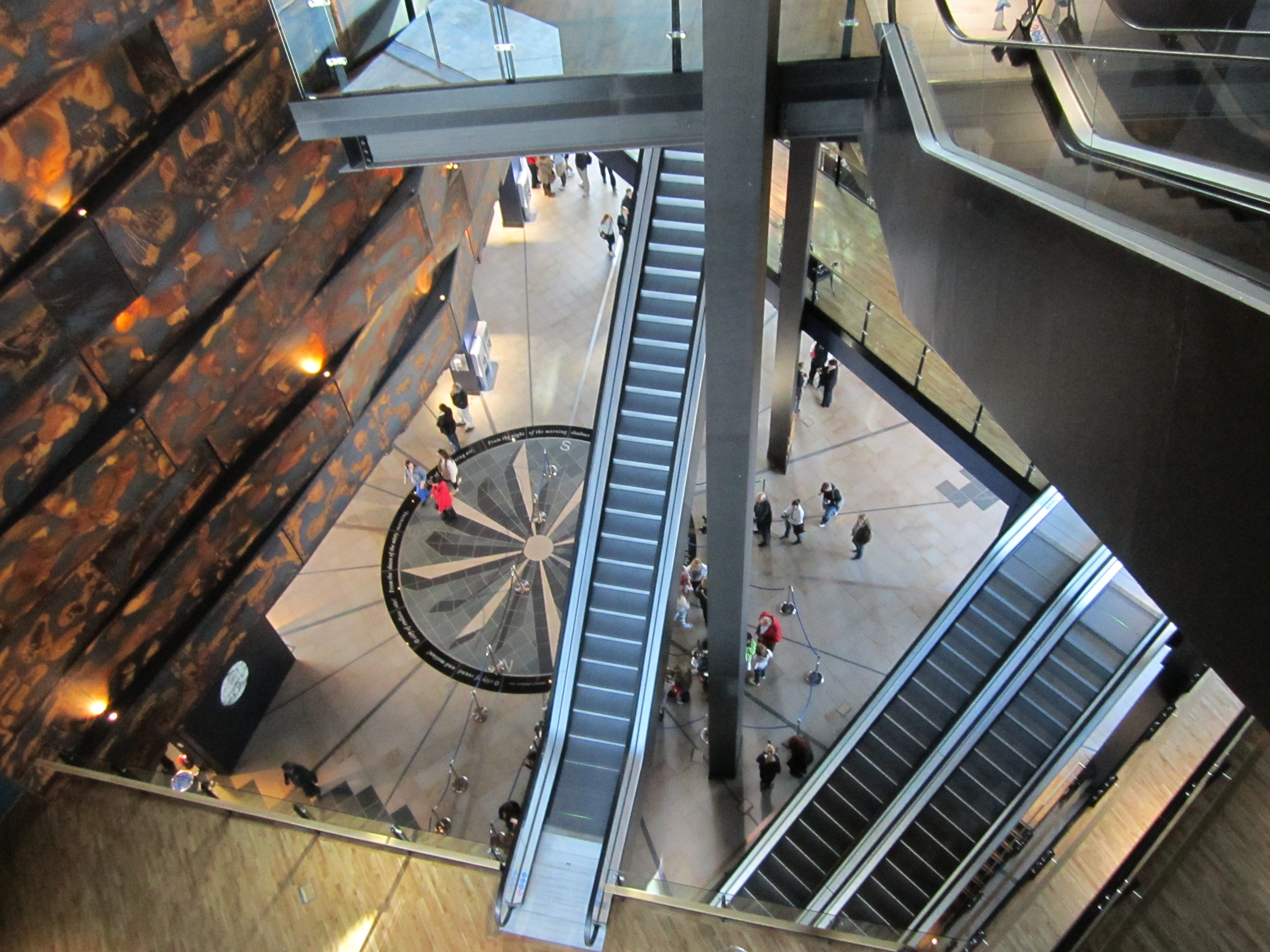
View looking down into the atrium of Titanic Belfast

The interior of the eight-storey building provides 12,000 square metres (130,000 sq ft) of space. Its centrepiece is a series of interpretive galleries exploring aspects of the building, design, sinking and legacy of Titanic. On the top floor of the museum is Belfast's largest conference and reception space, the Titanic Suite, a banqueting facility capable of seating 750 people. A reproduction of the original staircase on the Titanic, made famous by the James Cameron film Titanic in 1997, is located in this conference centre. Project director for interior architects Kay Elliott, Mark Muir proposed that a replica-like Titanic's staircase could be made for the building. The staircase was brought in as a focal point, a stage and a VIP route. There were no drawings of the historic staircase and current accessibility and health and safety standards still had to be satisfied. 10,000 individual parts make up the staircase which weighs nearly four tonnes.

The building also provides education, community, retail and restaurant facilities plus a community resource centre.

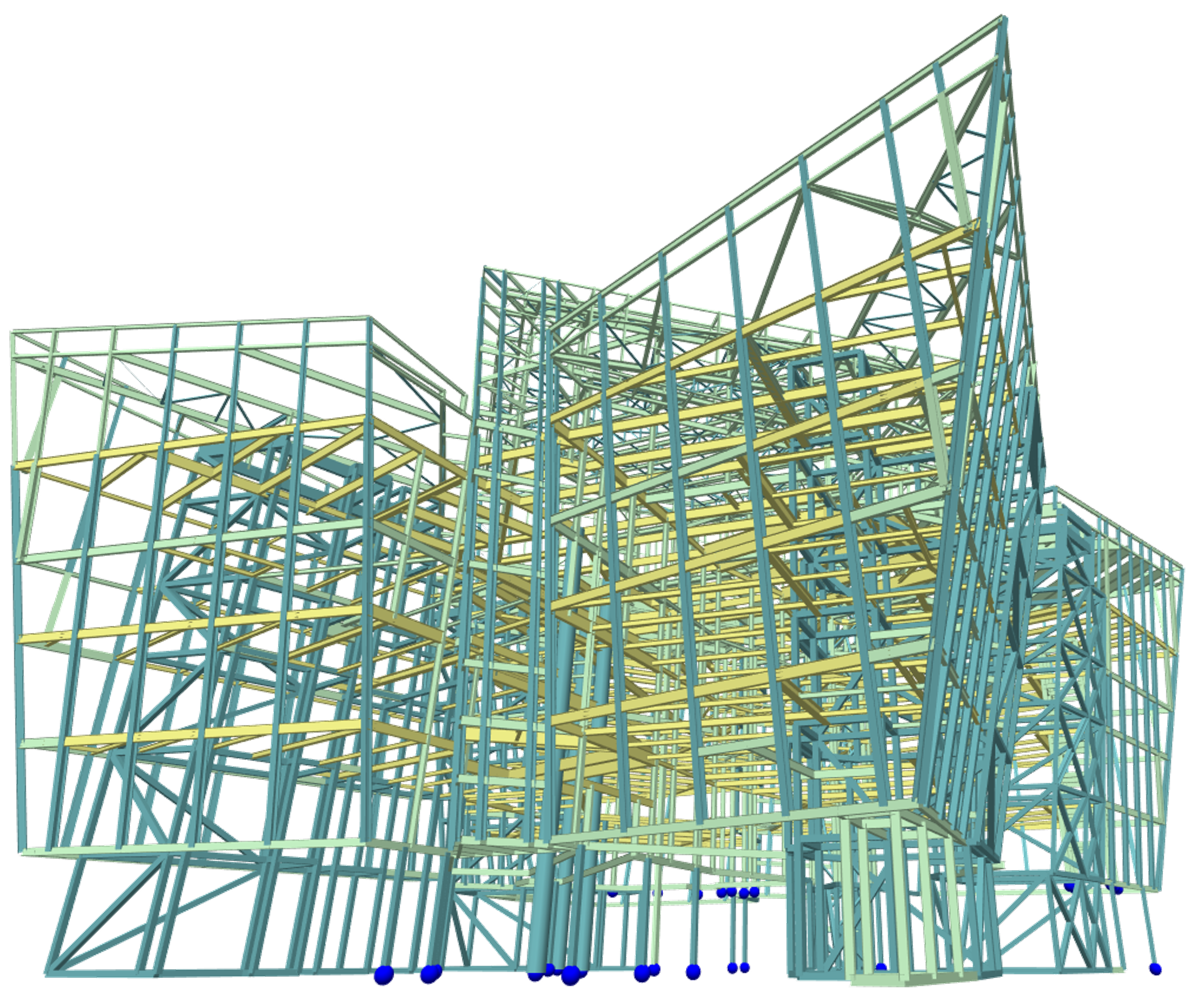
3d Titanic Structural Model, carried out in MasterSeries' Structural Design Software

=== Structural design ===
The structural design of the Titanic Belfast building was a complex engineering challenge due to its innovative architecture, including an "inverted" steel frame structure where floor sizes increase with height. The superstructure, composed of a steel frame with composite concrete beams and floors, required careful consideration of stability, especially with the large, unrestrained heights. MasterSeries was utilized in the design of the steel structure, enabling the engineers to model and analyse the unique frame stability issues, particularly where custom steel columns were necessary due to the aesthetic and spatial demands. The building's structural integrity was further enhanced by the integration of slip-form reinforced concrete staircases, which contributed to overall stability.

=== Construction ===
The construction of the building cost £77 million with an additional £24 million spent on pre-planning, enabling works, underground car park and public realm enhancements. The foundations to the building involved one of the country's largest-ever concrete pours with 4,200 cubic metres (150,000 cu ft) of concrete delivered by 700 concrete lorries in 24 hours. Harcourt Construction (NI) Ltd oversaw the design and building phase of the project., a subsidiary of Dublin-based property development company Harcourt Developments Ltd.

In front of the building is Titanica, a sculpture by Rowan Gillespie depicting a diving female figure. Made of bronze, it is mounted on a brass base, evoking the design of figureheads on ships' prows, and is meant to represent hope and positivity. The figure was dedicated by representatives of the Anglican, Catholic, Methodist and Presbyterian churches on 27 March 2012, a few days before the opening of Titanic Belfast.

== Hickson's Point ==
Opened in March 2018, the destination bar aims to resemble an authentic 1900s Belfast pub. The name of the space is inspired by Robert Hickson, one of the first shipbuilders in Belfast. The Easter inauguration event included live music from no Tonnta.

== Museum rooms ==
Titanic Belfast's exhibition was designed by London-based exhibition designers Event Communications and consists of nine interpretative and interactive galleries, covering the following themes:

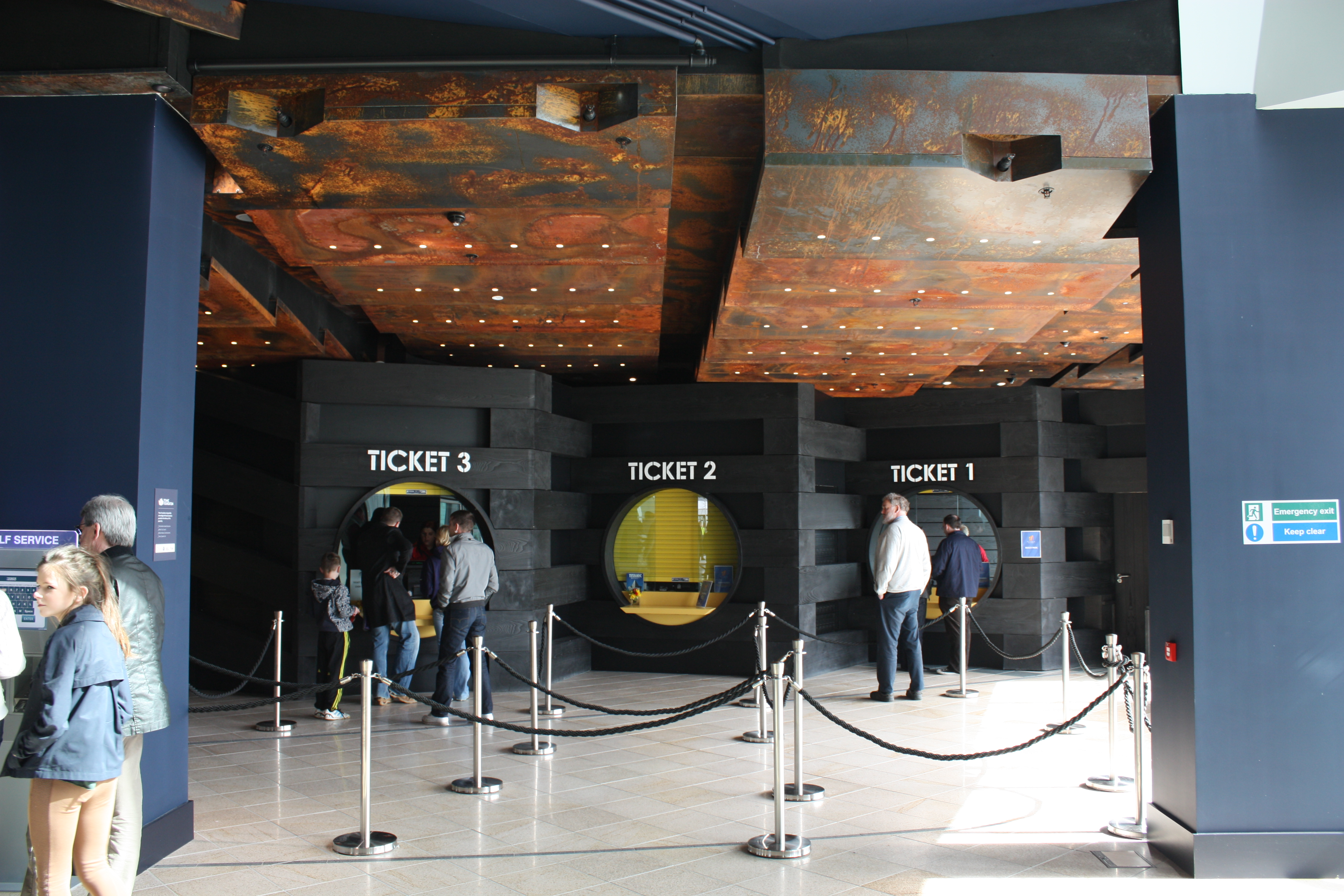
Ticket booths

- Boomtown Belfast – the city at the start of the 20th century

The first gallery recreates scenes from Belfast at the time of Titanic's construction in 1909–11. It illustrates the city's major industries before leading through an original set of gates from the Harland and Wolff shipyard into an interactive floor presenting Titanic's construction plans, along with original drawings and scale models of the ship.

- The Shipyard – a ride aboard a mini-car up and around a replica of Titanic's rudder

The second gallery is dominated by a steel scaffold standing 20 metres (66 ft), which alludes to the Arrol Gantry built to aid the construction of Titanic and Olympic. The actual gantry was four times the height of the gallery's representation. A lift carries visitors to the top of the gantry, where scenes of shipbuilding are displayed through audio and images. The visit continues on a six-seater car which takes the visitor on a ride through a recreation of a shipyard which moves through a scale replica of Titanic's enormous rudder.

- The Launch – how Titanic was launched on 31 May 1911

The Launch gallery portrays scenes from the Spring day when Titanic was launched into Belfast Lough, watched by 100,000 people. It overlooks the slipway from which Titanic was launched and a window enables visitors to see the slipways and docks as they appear now.

- The Fit-Out – the fitting-out of Titanic from her launch through to April 1912

The fourth gallery presents a large-scale model of Titanic to illustrate how the ship appeared to its passengers and crew, depicting all three classes of cabins. A central feature in the gallery presents a 360-degree computer-generated tour around Titanic through all the levels of the vessel, from the engine room to the dining saloons and the bridge.

- The Maiden Voyage – the journey from Belfast to Southampton, and from there to Cherbourg, Cobh and westwards

The ship's disastrous maiden voyage is depicted in the fifth gallery, which depicts the ship's boat deck. Visitors can walk across the wooden deck, sit on benches or look out at a view across the docks and harbour. The gallery also presents photographs of the ship by the Jesuit photographer Father Francis Browne, who was aboard Titanic for the leg from Southampton to Cobh in southern Ireland.

- The Sinking – the disaster of 14/15 April 1912

The sixth gallery portrays the sinking of the Titanic with the background sound of Morse code SOS messages being sent to other ships. Images of the sinking are combined with audio of survivors telling their stories and illustrations of the confused press reporting of the disaster. The iceberg is evoked by a wall of 400 replica life-jackets, on which an image of the sinking ship is projected.

- The Aftermath – the legacy of the disaster

The aftermath of the sinking is documented in the seventh gallery, which is dominated by a full-size replica of one of the lifeboats used to evacuate passengers from the ship. The American and British inquiries into the disaster are portrayed on either side of the lifeboat through videos and information panels. Visitors can use interactive screens to search the passenger and crew lists to find out if one of their relatives was aboard the ship. The gallery also presents information on the subsequent histories of Harland & Wolff and Titanic's sister ships.

- Myths & Legends – the facts behind some of the stories about the Titanic

The disaster gave rise to numerous legends and myths, perpetuated through films, plays, books and poems. With Celine Dion's song My Heart Will Go On playing in the background, visitors are able to explore aspects of the popular culture inspired by Titanic. Interactive screens also enable the visitor to explore myths about the ship.

- Titanic Beneath – about the wreck of the Titanic and its rediscovery

The last gallery presents Titanic as she is now, 12,000 feet (3,700 m) below the surface of the North Atlantic. Presented in conjunction with the discoverer of the wreck of Titanic, Dr Robert Ballard, the gallery illustrates his expeditions to the ship through footage, audio and images. A fish-eye view of the wreck is set under the glass floor. Below the floor is the Ocean Exploration Centre, Titanic Belfast's principal educational facility, which shows marine biology and exploration in Northern Ireland's coastal waters as well as Ballard's various expeditions around the world.

=== Planned purchase of artifacts ===
In late August 2018, several groups were vying for the right to purchase the 5,500 RMS Titanic relics that were an asset of the bankrupt Premier Exhibitions. Eventually, Titanic Belfast, Titanic Foundation Limited and the National Museums Northern Ireland joined with the National Maritime Museum in Greenwich as a consortium that was raising money to purchase the 5,500 artefacts. The group intended to keep all of the items together as a single exhibit. Oceanographer Robert Ballard said he favoured this group since it would ensure that the memorabilia would be permanently displayed in Belfast (where the Titanic was built) and in Greenwich. The museums were critical of the bid process set by the Bankruptcy court in Jacksonville, Florida. The minimum bid for the 11 October 2018 auction was set at US$21.5 million (£16.5m) and the consortium did not have enough funding to meet that amount.

== See also ==
- List of tourist attractions in Ireland
- List of Titanic museums
