= Pigeon Forge, Tennessee =

- City
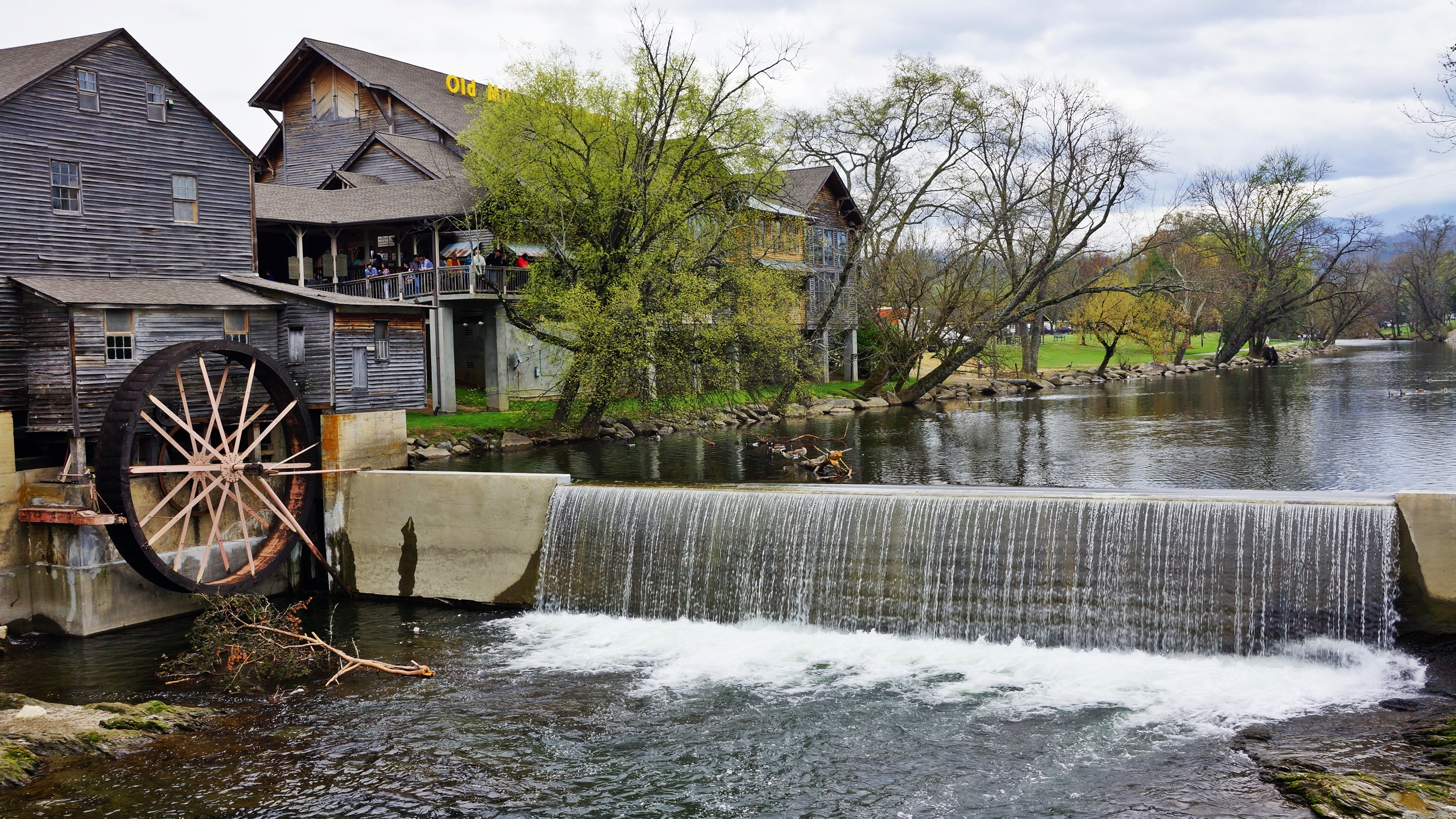
- Pigeon Forge Mill

- Flag Logo
- Motto: "The Center of Fun In The Smokies"
- Location of Pigeon Forge in Sevier County, Tennessee.

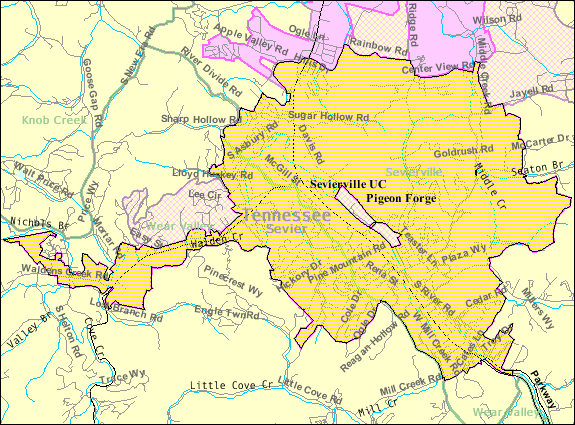
- U.S. Census Map

- Location within Tennessee Location within the United States
- Coordinates: 35°47′53″N 83°33′50″W
- Country: United States
- State: Tennessee
- County: Sevier
- Settled: 1780s
- Incorporated: 1961
- Named for: 19th-century iron forge along the Little Pigeon River

Government
  - Mayor: Kevin McClure

Area
  - Total: 13.82 sq mi (35.80 km^{2})
  - Land: 13.82 sq mi (35.80 km^{2})
  - Water: 0 sq mi (0.00 km^{2})
- Elevation: 994 ft (303 m)

Population (2020)
  - Total: 6,343
  - Estimate (2024): 6,446 ▲
  - Density: 459/sq mi (177.2/km^{2})
- Time zone: UTC-5 (Eastern (EST))
  - Summer (DST): UTC-4 (EDT)
- ZIP code: 37862, 37863, 37868
- Area code: 865
- FIPS code: 47-58080
- GNIS feature ID: 2404516
- Website: https://www.cityofpigeonforgetn.gov/

Pigeon Forge is a city in Sevier County, Tennessee, United States. The population was 6,343 at the 2020 census. Situated 5 miles (8.0 km) north of Great Smoky Mountains National Park, Pigeon Forge is a tourist destination that caters primarily to Southern culture and country music fans. The city's attractions include Dollywood and Dollywood's Splash Country as well as numerous other museums, musical theaters, and shopping centers.

== History ==
=== Early history ===
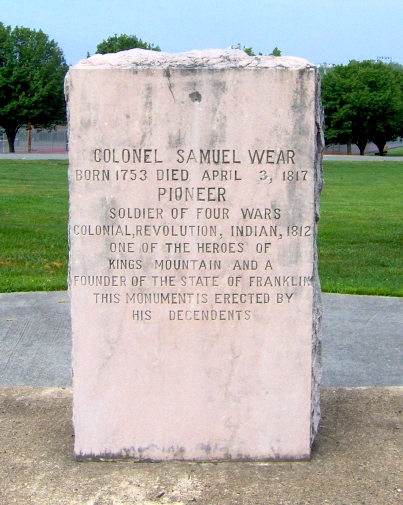
Monument honoring Samuel Wear in Pigeon Forge City Park.

The name "Pigeon Forge" comes from an iron forge built by Isaac Love (1783–1854) some time around 1820. The name of this forge referred to its location along the Little Pigeon River, in the vicinity of what became the Old Mill. The name of the river comes from the flocks of passenger pigeons that frequented its banks when the first Euro-American settlers arrived.

For centuries, the Cherokee used the valley where Pigeon Forge is located as a hunting ground. A Cherokee footpath known as "Indian Gap Trail" crossed the Great Smokies from North Carolina and passed through the Pigeon Forge valley en route to its junction with Great Indian Warpath in modern Sevierville. (US-441 closely parallels this ancient trail, although it crests the mountains at Newfound Gap rather than Indian Gap). From Sevierville, Great Indian Warpath headed west toward the Overhill Cherokee towns along the Little Tennessee River.

=== 18th century ===
Indian Gap Trail brought the first Europeans to the Pigeon Forge area in the early 18th century. Along with hunters and trappers from North Carolina, traders from Virginia passed through the valley before 1750. Some time after 1783, Colonel Samuel Wear became one of the first permanent white settlers in the Pigeon Forge area. A veteran of the American Revolution, Wear erected a stockade near the confluence of Walden Creek and Little Pigeon River (modern Pigeon Forge City Park) in 1792. This "fort" provided a safe stopover for early pioneers in the Sevier County area. Wear later served as a member of the committee that drafted Tennessee's state constitution.

In 1785, Cherokee signed the Treaty of Dumplin Creek, ceding much of what became Sevier County to the United States. Among the first to take advantage of this was Robert Shields (1740–1802), who received a survey for a tract of land in the Pigeon Forge area from the Watauga Land Office in 1786. Shields, who was also a veteran of the Revolution, established a small fort along Middle Creek near modern Dollywood. Shields' son later wrote that the fort was 100 feet (30 m) long and 16 feet (4.9 m) wide, with 12-foot (3.7 m) walls constructed with "heavy logs". The fort contained living quarters for six families, with a common kitchen at one end and a common living room at the other. As his family grew, Shields constructed separate houses for his children, one of which was purchased by Horatio Butler in 1797 and remained with his descendants until it was torn down in 1994.

Although the Shields Fort was too far from the main Cherokee trails to ever experience a serious assault, the Wear Fort straddled Indian Gap Trail, making it a target for small bands of Cherokee warriors. After the Cherokee attacked his fort in 1793, a frustrated Wear led a band of 60 frontiersmen across the northwestern Smokies into the Overhill Cherokee region, where they attacked and destroyed the town of Tallassee (near modern Calderwood Dam), killing at least 15 Cherokees and capturing several others. In 1794, the Cherokee fired on Wear and his two sons just outside Calvin's Blockhouse (near Maryville), but they both escaped unharmed.

Although treaties negotiated at Tellico Blockhouse in 1794 and 1798 brought calm to the region, sporadic fighting between Cherokees and the settlers continued. One incident occurred in 1802, when Tavenor Runyan (1787–1802), the son of Isaac Barefoot Runyan (1749–1845) and Margaret Rambo (who had settled near the heart of modern Pigeon Forge), was killed by a Cherokee warrior. The recently elected Governor Archibald Roane was forced to personally intervene to prevent retaliatory strikes.

=== 19th century ===
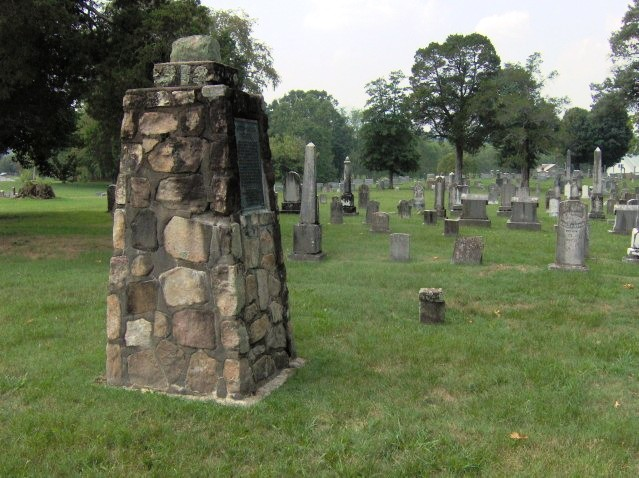
Bishop Francis Asbury monument at Shiloh Memorial Cemetery.

Like many Appalachian communities, religion played a major role in the early history of Pigeon Forge. In the early 19th century, circuit riders preached in the valley, creating a large Methodist following that remains to the modern day. On October 20, 1808, Bishop Francis Asbury delivered a sermon at what became Shiloh Memorial Cemetery in the northern half of Pigeon Forge, where a crude log church was erected. The first "tourists" to visit Pigeon Forge came for the extended revivals that were held in the Middle Creek area on the grounds of what became Middle Creek Methodist Church as early as 1822. These revivals could last for weeks at a time.

In 1810, Revolutionary War veteran Mordecai Lewis obtained a 151-acre (61 ha) land grant along the Little Pigeon River near the heart of future Pigeon Forge. In 1817, Lewis' son-in-law, Isaac Love (1783−1854), established the iron forge for which the city was eventually named. The complex included a bloomery furnace and water-powered trip hammer to smelt and mold ore into iron bars. Love erected the Pigeon Forge Mill in 1830, and on May 29, 1841, Love's son, William, established a post office – which he named "Pigeon Forge" – for the mill and the small community that had developed in its vicinity. Local businessman John Sevier Trotter (1807−1884) purchased the mill and furnace in 1849 and subsequently made numerous modifications, including the addition of a sawmill. Although the iron furnace was sold and relocated in the 1880s, the Pigeon Forge Mill – usually called "Old Mill" – still stands and has been placed on the National Register of Historic Places.

In the 1870s, a health resort was established in Pigeon Forge at Henderson Springs, adjacent to the Fort Wear site on the town's north side. It was common during this period for the residents of large urban areas to visit mountain springs, the waters of which were believed to have health-restoring qualities.

=== 20th century ===
In the early 20th century, Pigeon Forge was an isolated mountain hamlet with no major roads. The nearest railroad station was in Sevierville. Bridges were also rare, with the only major water crossings being a string of fords along the Little Pigeon.

When Great Smoky Mountains National Park opened in 1934, the Tennessee Valley Authority reported no tourism-oriented businesses in Pigeon Forge. By the 1950s, improvements to US 441 led to the establishment of a few campgrounds and lodges, but they did not generate major revenue. During this period, however, two factors in nearby Gatlinburg led to the eventual commercial boom Pigeon Forge experienced in the latter half of the 20th century. First, surrounded by high mountain ridges, Gatlinburg had limited land resources. Second, its land resources were largely controlled by a few local families who thwarted attempts by outside businesses to take advantage of the town's prime location. Thus, outside entrepreneurs were forced to look elsewhere. Pigeon Forge, located just north of Gatlinburg along US-441, became a target.

In 1961, shortly after Pigeon Forge incorporated, North Carolina brothers Grover and Harry Robbins opened Rebel Railroad in the town's Middle Creek area. The railroad simulated a ride on a Confederate steam train that was under attack by Union soldiers during the Civil War, playing upon the centennial of the war. After the Union assault was beaten back, the railroad came to a stop at a mock frontier mountain town, complete with blacksmith shop, general store, and saloon. By 1964, interest in the Civil War Centennial was beginning to die down, so the Robbins brothers decided to rename the railroad Goldrush Junction. The attraction was reworked with a "Wild West" theme replacing the Civil War theme, in a similar fashion to the Robbins' other tourist train ride in North Carolina, Tweetsie Railroad. Goldrush Junction was much more successful than Rebel Railroad, prompting the Robbins' to buy a log flume amusement ride and erect it on the property in 1967. According to a park tourist brochure of the time, the ride was "brought to Goldrush Junction from the New York World's Fair, where it was one of the most successful attractions."

In 1969, after Pigeon Forge issued a zoning plan assigning the entire strip along US-441 for tourism use, Art Modell (owner of the Cleveland Browns) purchased Goldrush Junction. In 1976, Modell sold it to the Herschend Brothers of Branson, Missouri. The Herschends renamed the park Silver Dollar City after their successful theme park in Branson. The Ozark mountain theme of the Branson location was easily reapplied as an Appalachian theme in Pigeon Forge, and the park's attendance began to climb.

In 1982, hoping to capitalize on the publicity generated by the Knoxville World's Fair, Pigeon Forge initiated an aggressive economic plan that centered around theme parks, outlet malls, and live music venues. The first outlet mall, Factory Merchants, opened that same year. By 1987, there were four outlet malls in Pigeon Forge, and by the early 1990s, outlet malls provided 44% of the town's gross revenue.

The increasing number of tourist attractions brought competition for Silver Dollar City and its chief competitor in Pigeon Forge, Magic World, which had constructed a theme park on the slopes of Pine Mountain in the city's south section. In 1985, the Herschends approached entertainer Dolly Parton (who was born in nearby Sevierville) with a proposal for a partnership in the promotion and operation of Silver Dollar City. After lengthy negotiations, Parton became a majority partner in the enterprise, and Silver Dollar City was renamed Dollywood to launch a major marketing campaign. Magic World folded in 1994.

=== 21st century ===
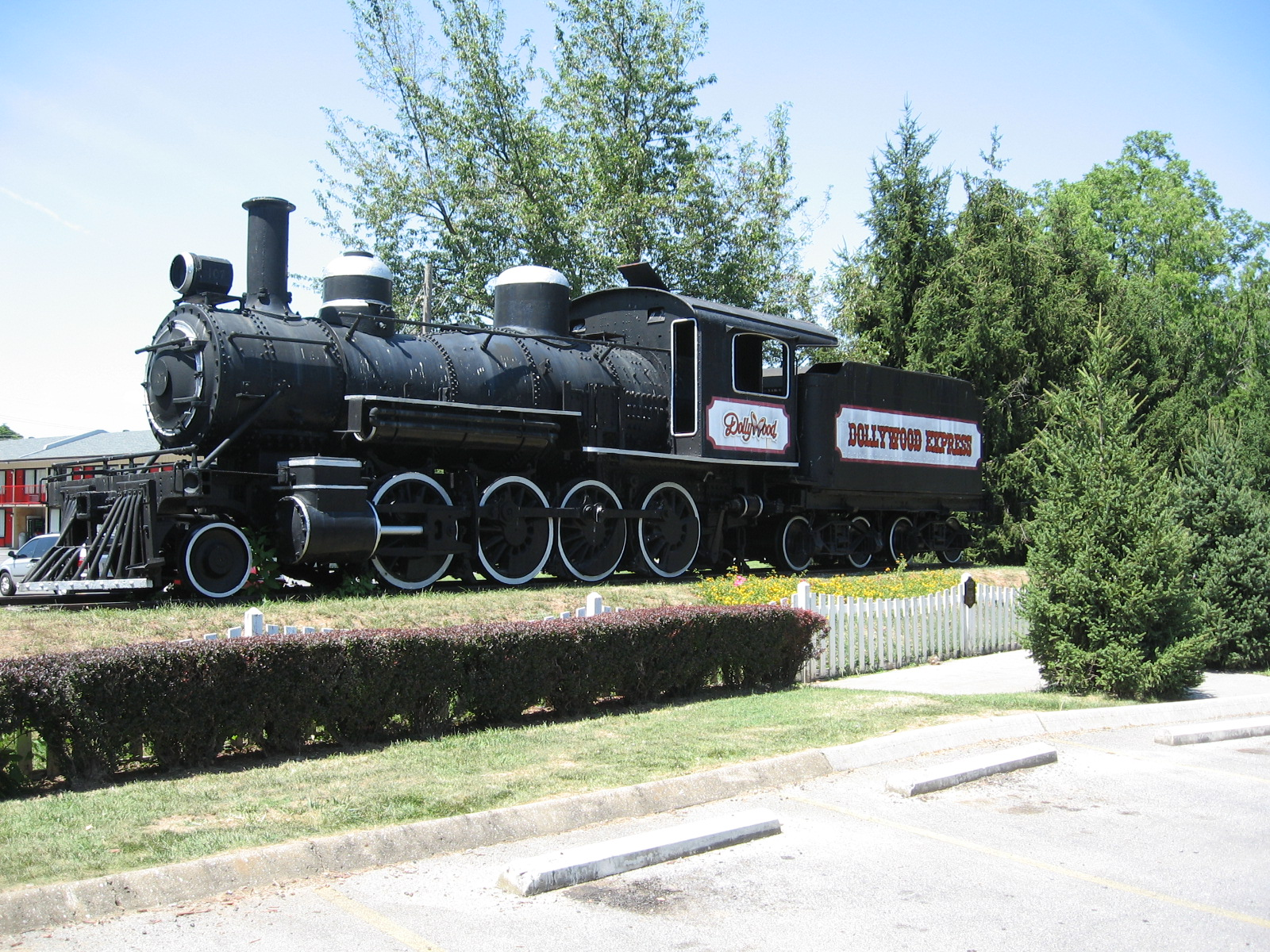
The "Dollywood Express" at Dollywood

Although the commercial boom in Pigeon Forge vastly increased the town's revenue, it had several undesirable effects. As land value increased, many farmers could no longer afford the accompanying high property taxes and were forced to sell their land. The high cost of living in Pigeon Forge is difficult to offset with the low wage jobs that often accompany the tourist industry.

Dollywood continued expansion into the 21st century, adding a separate water park in 2001.

In 2016, the area was affected by the 2016 Great Smoky Mountains wildfires.

=== Registered historic sites ===
- Pigeon Forge Mill: Listed on the National Register of Historic Places in 1975, this working gristmill, also known as Old Mill, is on the West Fork of the Little Pigeon River (along its east bank), and is accessible via Old Mill Drive (which intersects the Parkway at Light #7). The site includes a millhouse, milldam, and breastshot wheel.

== Geography ==
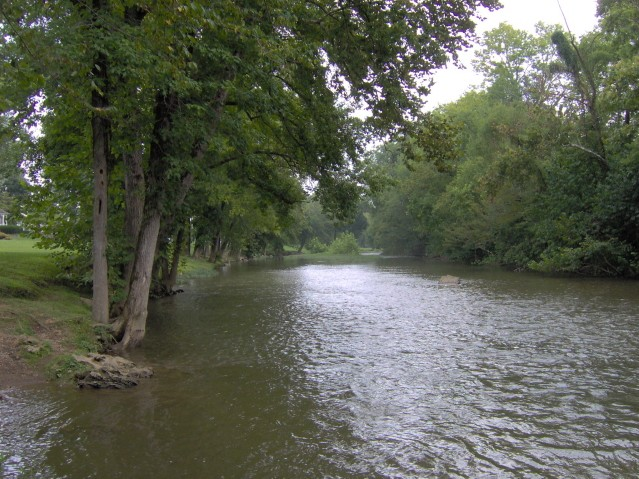
West Fork of the Little Pigeon River

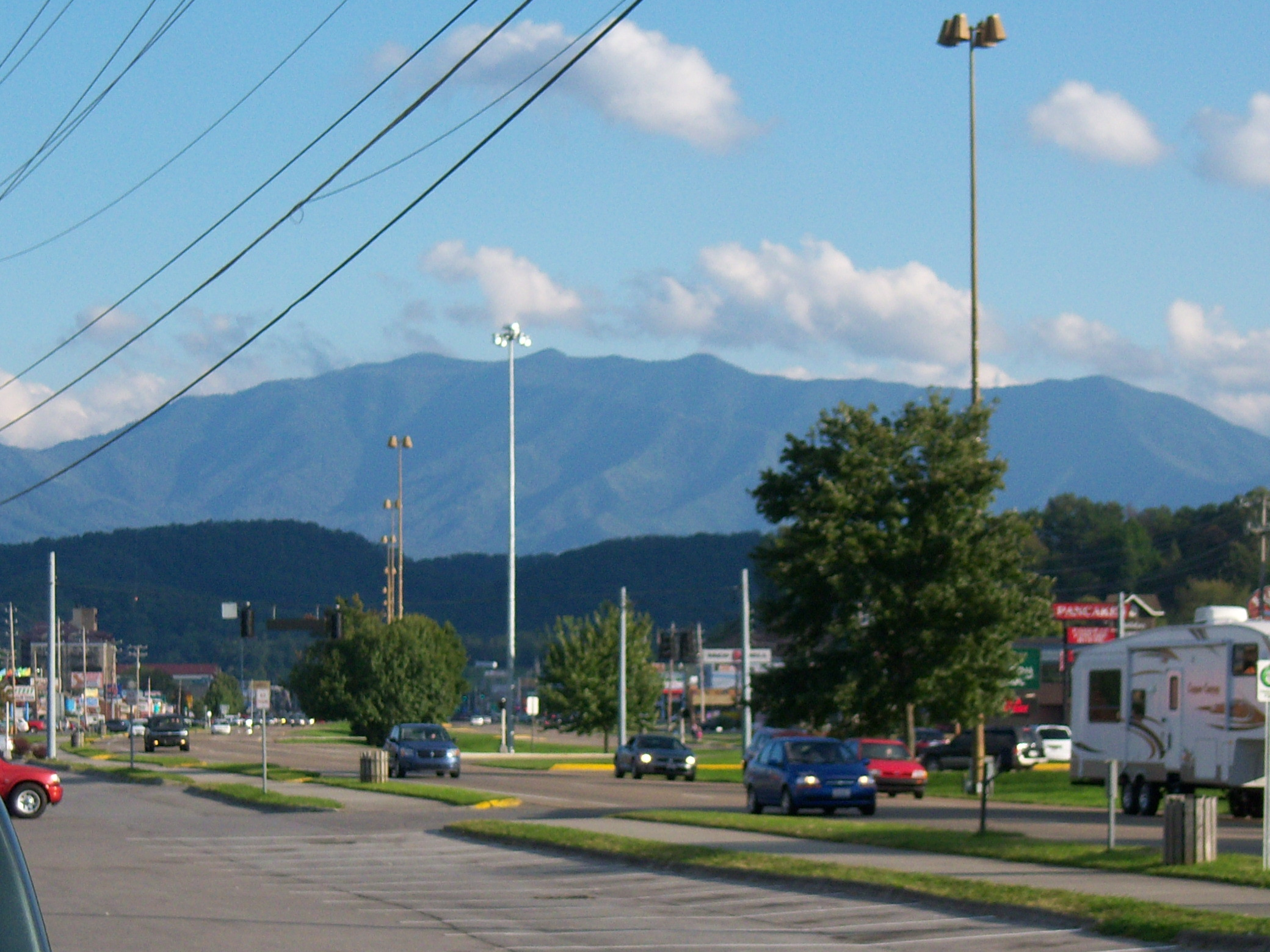
Pigeon Forge with Mount Le Conte in the background

Pigeon Forge is located on the West Fork of the Little Pigeon River. According to the United States Census Bureau, the city has a total area of 11.6 square miles (30.0 km^{2}), all of which is land.

The West Fork of the Little Pigeon River flows north from its source high on the slopes of Mount Collins through Sevier County before linking up with the Middle Fork in Sevierville. Pigeon Forge occupies a narrow valley along this river between Sevierville and Gatlinburg. High ridges surround Pigeon Forge on three sides, with Pine Mountain to the west, Shields Mountain to the east, and Cove Mountain to the south. A bend in the Little Pigeon provides the city's northern border with Sevierville, and a narrow gorge cut by the river between Cove Mountain and Shields Mountain acts as the city's boundary with Gatlinburg.

=== Climate ===
Pigeon Forge has a humid subtropical climate (Köppen climate classification: Cfa) with cool winters and hot summers. Precipitation is heavy year round, peaking during the months of May–July, with October being the driest month, having only 2.67 inches (68 mm) of average annual precipitation.

As of 2023, Pigeon Forge falls within USDA Hardiness Zone 7B.

Climate data for Pigeon Forge, Tennessee
Month	Jan	Feb	Mar	Apr	May	Jun	Jul	Aug	Sep	Oct	Nov	Dec	Year
Record high °F (°C)	81 (27)	85 (29)	86 (30)	92 (33)	98 (37)	106 (41)	105 (41)	100 (38)	101 (38)	94 (34)	85 (29)	80 (27)	106 (41)
Mean daily maximum °F (°C)	48 (9)	53 (12)	61 (16)	70 (21)	77 (25)	83 (28)	86 (30)	85 (29)	80 (27)	71 (22)	61 (16)	51 (11)	69 (21)
Mean daily minimum °F (°C)	25 (−4)	28 (−2)	33 (1)	41 (5)	50 (10)	58 (14)	63 (17)	61 (16)	55 (13)	43 (6)	34 (1)	28 (−2)	43 (6)
Record low °F (°C)	−18 (−28)	−13 (−25)	−6 (−21)	19 (−7)	26 (−3)	33 (1)	43 (6)	40 (4)	27 (−3)	15 (−9)	2 (−17)	−12 (−24)	−18 (−28)
Average precipitation inches (mm)	4.56 (116)	4.66 (118)	4.74 (120)	4.22 (107)	5.88 (149)	5.52 (140)	5.82 (148)	4.57 (116)	4.35 (110)	2.67 (68)	4.13 (105)	4.32 (110)	55.44 (1,407)
Average snowfall inches (cm)	2.1 (5.3)	2.3 (5.8)	2.9 (7.4)	0.0 (0.0)	0.0 (0.0)	0.0 (0.0)	0.0 (0.0)	0.0 (0.0)	0.0 (0.0)	0.0 (0.0)	0.7 (1.8)	1.0 (2.5)	9 (22.8)

== Demographics ==
Historical population
Census	Pop.	Note	%±
1970	1,361		—
1980	1,822		33.9%
1990	3,027		66.1%
2000	5,083		67.9%
2010	5,875		15.6%
2020	6,343		8.0%
2024 (est.)	6,446		1.6%

=== Racial and ethnic composition ===
Pigeon Forge city, Tennessee – Racial and ethnic composition Note: the US Census treats Hispanic/Latino as an ethnic category. This table excludes Latinos from the racial categories and assigns them to a separate category. Hispanics/Latinos may be of any race.
Race / Ethnicity (NH = Non-Hispanic)	Pop 2000	Pop 2010	Pop 2020	% 2000	% 2010	% 2020
White alone (NH)	4,727	4,513	4,245	93.00%	76.82%	66.92%
Black or African American alone (NH)	33	45	66	0.65%	0.77%	1.04%
Native American or Alaska Native alone (NH)	11	35	17	0.22%	0.60%	0.27%
Asian alone (NH)	65	122	211	1.28%	2.08%	3.33%
Native Hawaiian or Pacific Islander alone (NH)	3	0	3	0.06%	0.00%	0.05%
Other race alone (NH)	1	9	25	0.02%	0.15%	0.39%
Mixed race or Multiracial (NH)	55	79	212	1.08%	1.34%	3.34%
Hispanic or Latino (any race)	188	1,072	1,564	3.70%	18.25%	24.66%
Total	5,083	5,875	6,343	100.00%	100.00%	100.00%

=== 2020 census ===
As of the 2020 census, Pigeon Forge had a population of 6,343, with 2,456 households and 1,712 families residing in the city.

As of the 2020 census, the median age was 39.5 years; 22.2% of residents were under the age of 18 and 18.1% of residents were 65 years of age or older. For every 100 females there were 98.4 males, and for every 100 females age 18 and over there were 95.2 males age 18 and over.

Of those households, 32.0% had children under the age of 18 living in them. Of all households, 42.9% were married-couple households, 19.7% were households with a male householder and no spouse or partner present, and 28.0% were households with a female householder and no spouse or partner present. About 26.0% of all households were made up of individuals and 10.2% had someone living alone who was 65 years of age or older.

The 2020 census counted 4,699 housing units, of which 47.7% were vacant. The homeowner vacancy rate was 2.9% and the rental vacancy rate was 15.8%.

As of the 2020 census, 97.5% of residents lived in urban areas, while 2.5% lived in rural areas.

Racial composition as of the 2020 census
Race	Number	Percent
White	4,598	72.5%
Black or African American	72	1.1%
American Indian and Alaska Native	42	0.7%
Asian	211	3.3%
Native Hawaiian and Other Pacific Islander	3	0.0%
Some other race	910	14.3%
Two or more races	507	8.0%

=== 2010 census ===
As of the 2010 census, Pigeon Forge had 5,875 people, 2,238 households, and 1,482 families residing in the city. The population density was 506.5 inhabitants per square mile (195.6/km^{2}). There were 5,187 housing units at an average density of 447.2 per square mile (172.7/km^{2}). The racial makeup of the city was 80.6% White, 1.1% African American, 0.7% Native American, 2.1% Asian, 0.1% Pacific Islander, 13.5% from other races, and 1.9% from two or more races. Hispanic or Latino of any race accounted for 18.2% of the population.

Of the 2,238 households, 31.2% had children under the age of 18 living with them, 46.6% were married couples living together, 14.3% had a female householder with no husband present, 5.3% had a male householder with no wife present, and 33.8% were non-families. 23.7% of all households were made up of individuals living alone, and 9.4% of those living alone were 65 years of age or older. The average household size was 2.58, and the average family size was 2.99.

The population consisted of 23.8% of individuals under the age of 20, 8.1% from 20 to 24, 27.9% from 25 to 44, 24.8% from 45 to 64, and 15.4% who were 65 years of age or older. The median age was 37.8 years. For every 100 females, there were 102.7 males. For every 100 females age 18 and over, there were 101 males.

According to 2012–2016 American Community Survey 5-Year Estimates conducted by the U.S. Census Bureau, the median income for a household in Pigeon Forge was $34,949, and the median income for a family was $41,829. Males had a median income of $31,933 versus $20,838 for females. The per capita income for the city was $20,959. About 9.8% of families and 10.6% of the population were living below the poverty line, including 15.4% of those under age 18 and 2.7% of those age 65 or older.

== Gallery ==
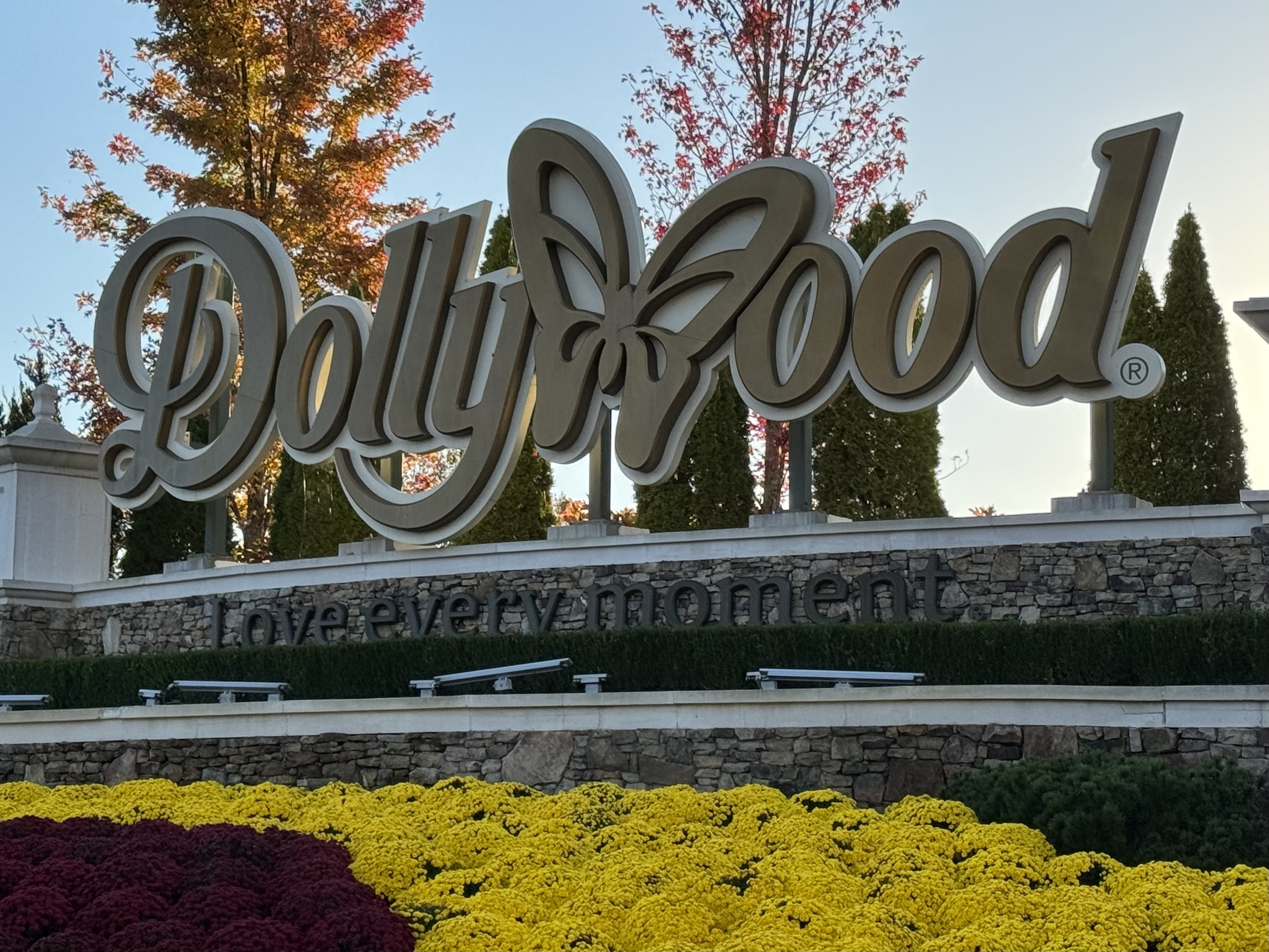
Dollywood entrance sign

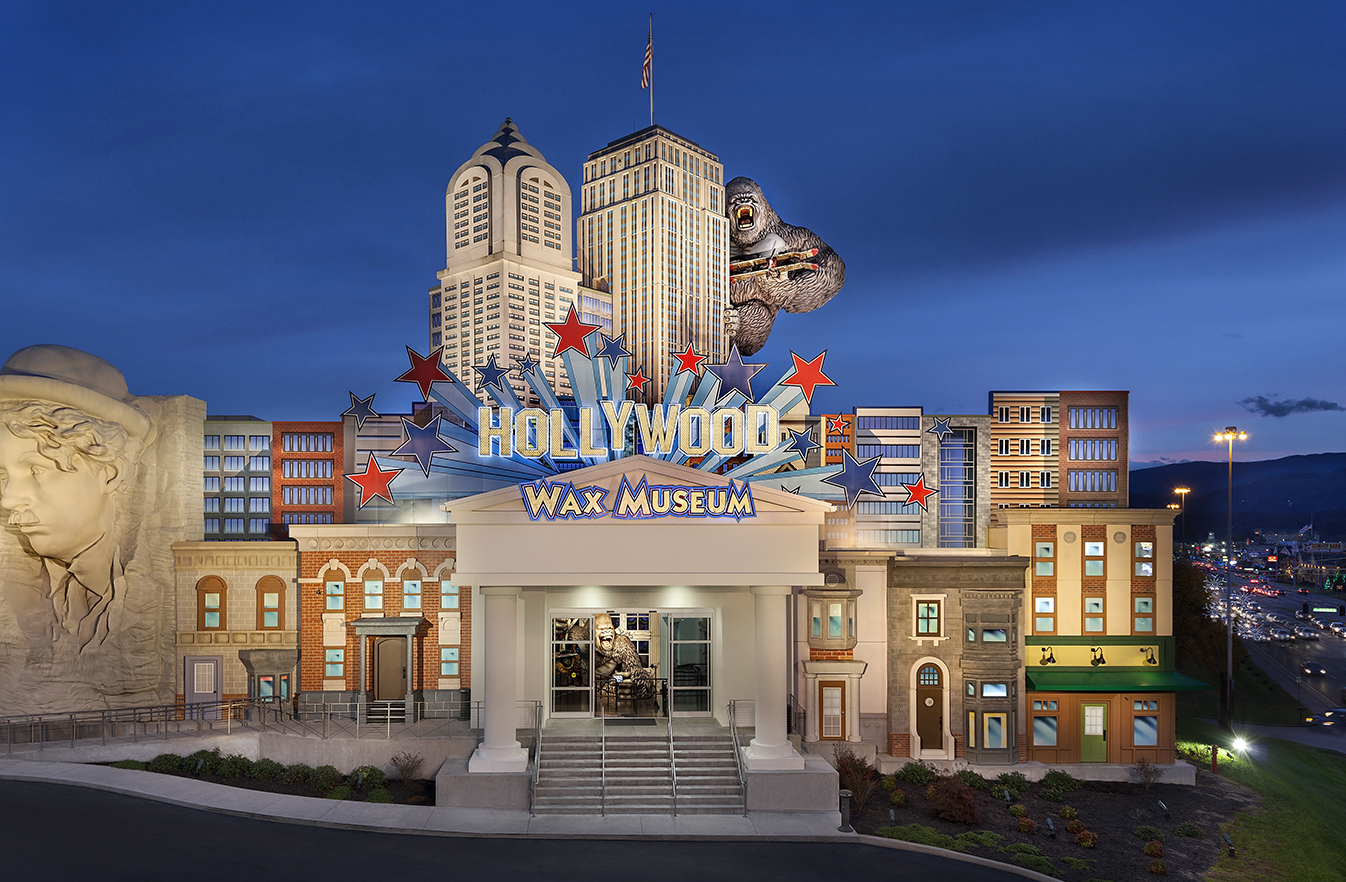
Hollywood Wax Museum

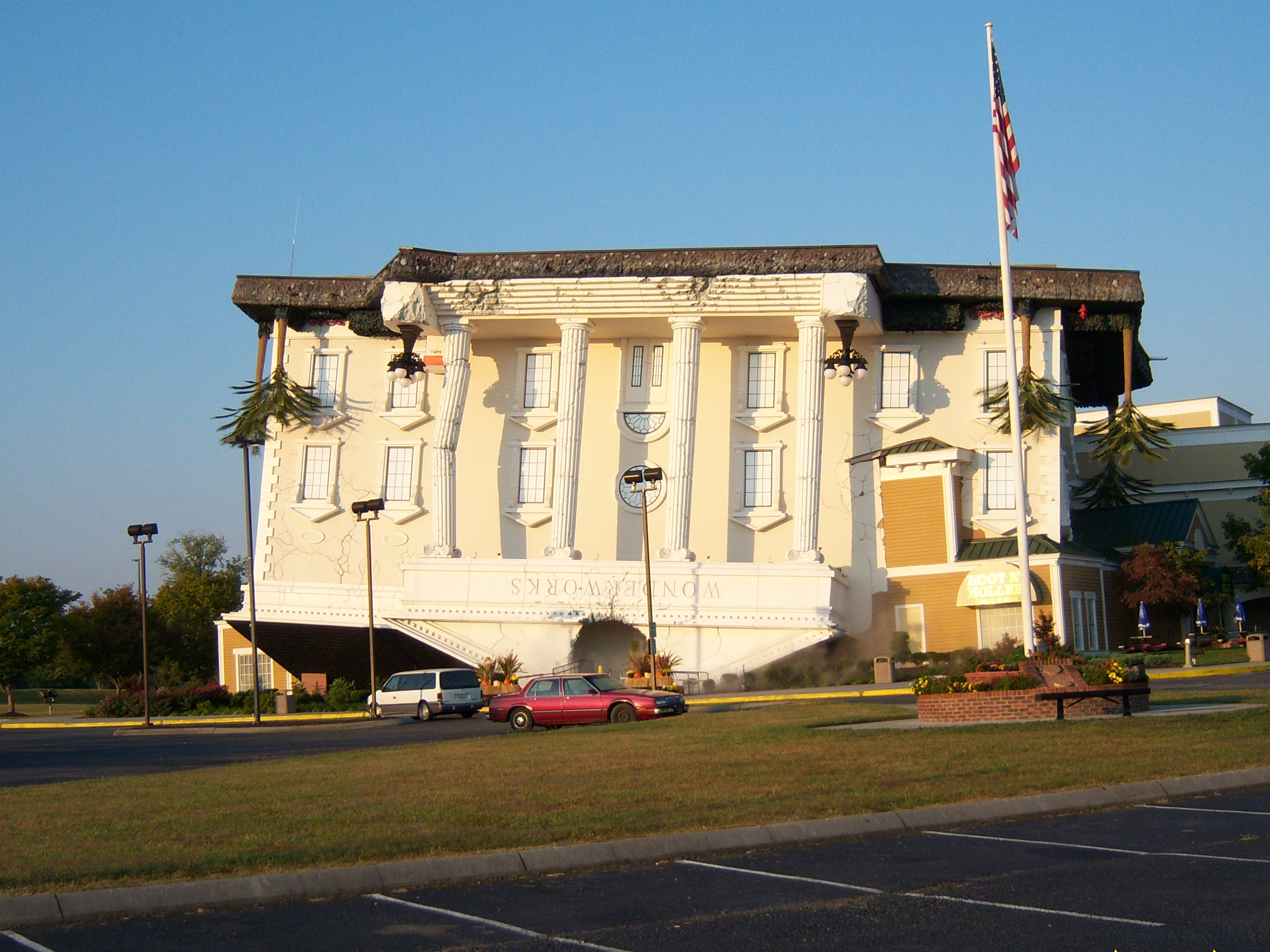
WonderWorks

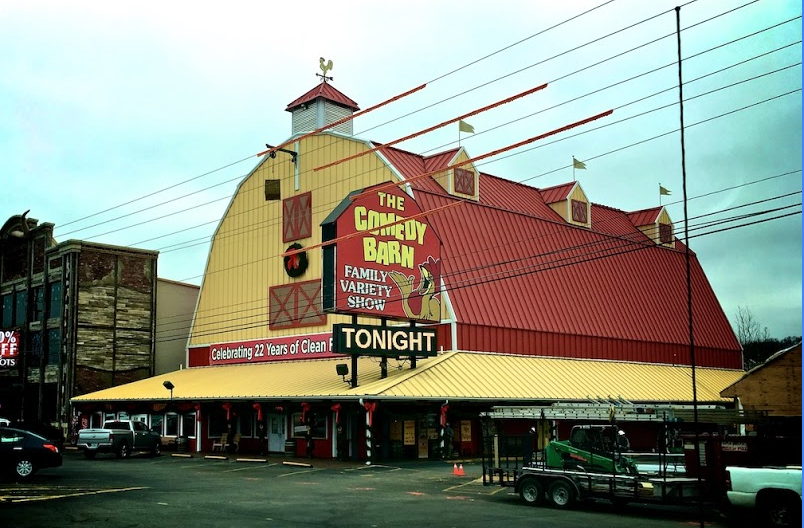
The Comedy Barn Theater

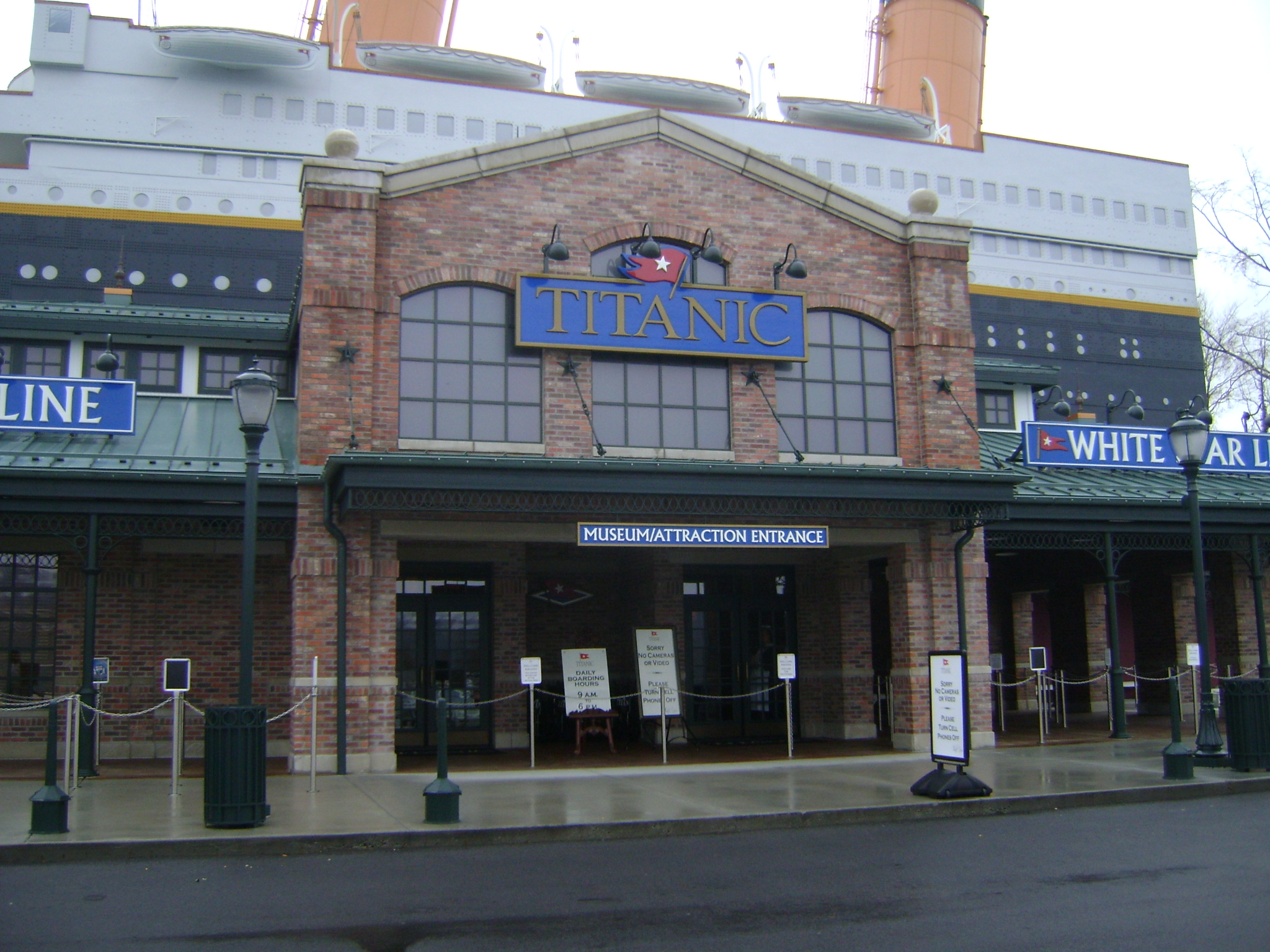
Titanic Museum

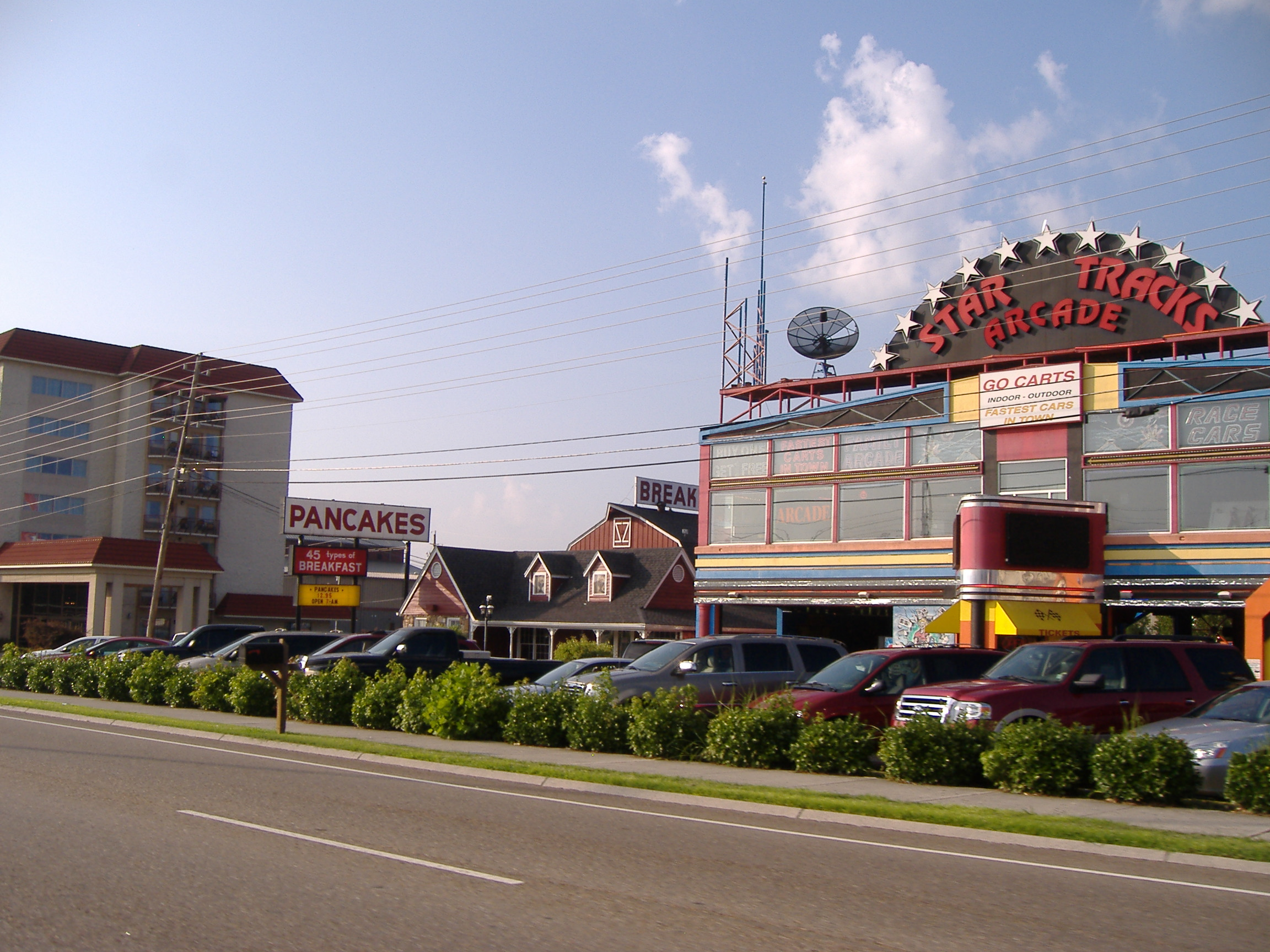
Tourism

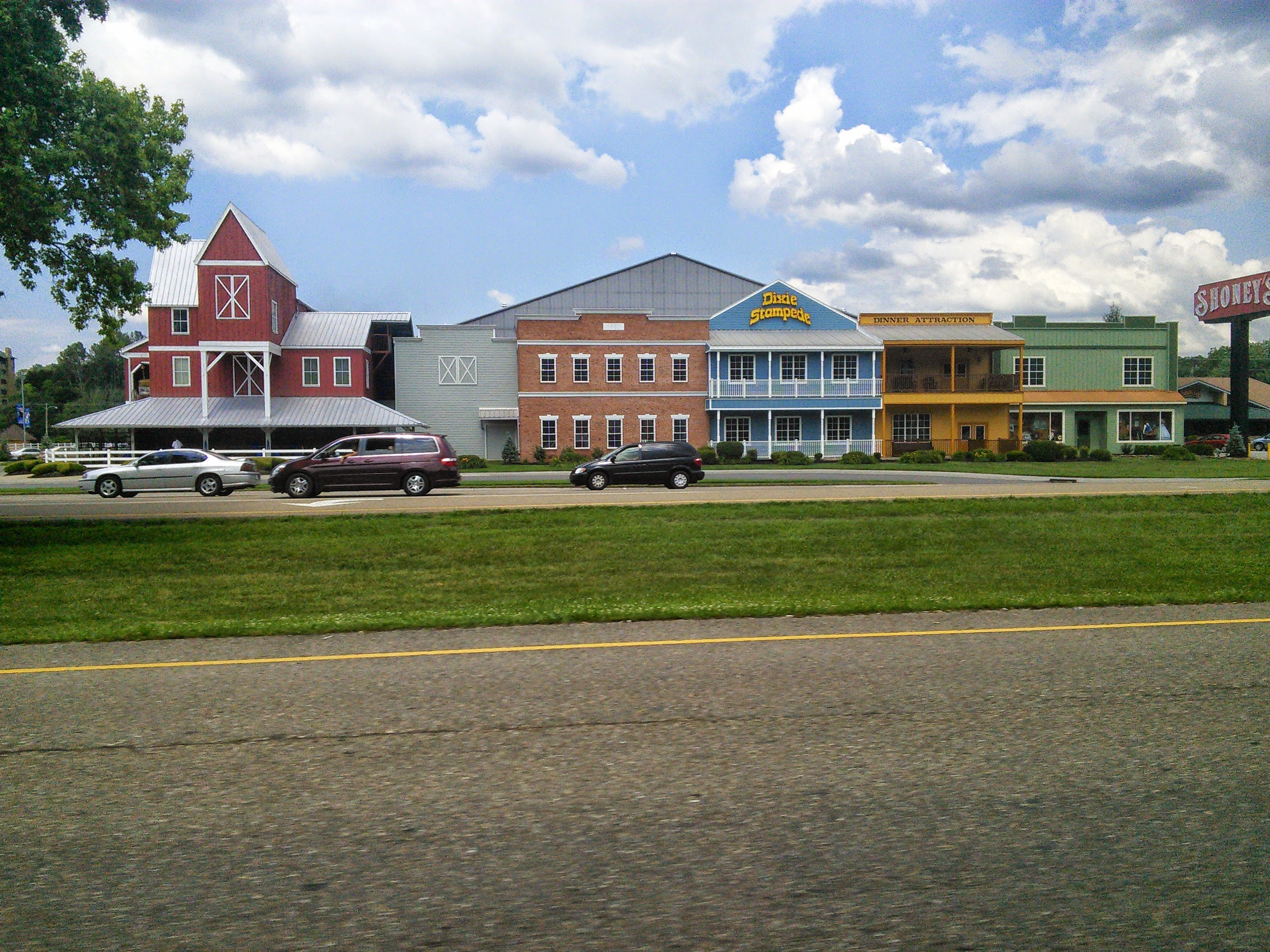
Dixie Stampede (now Dolly Parton's Stampede)

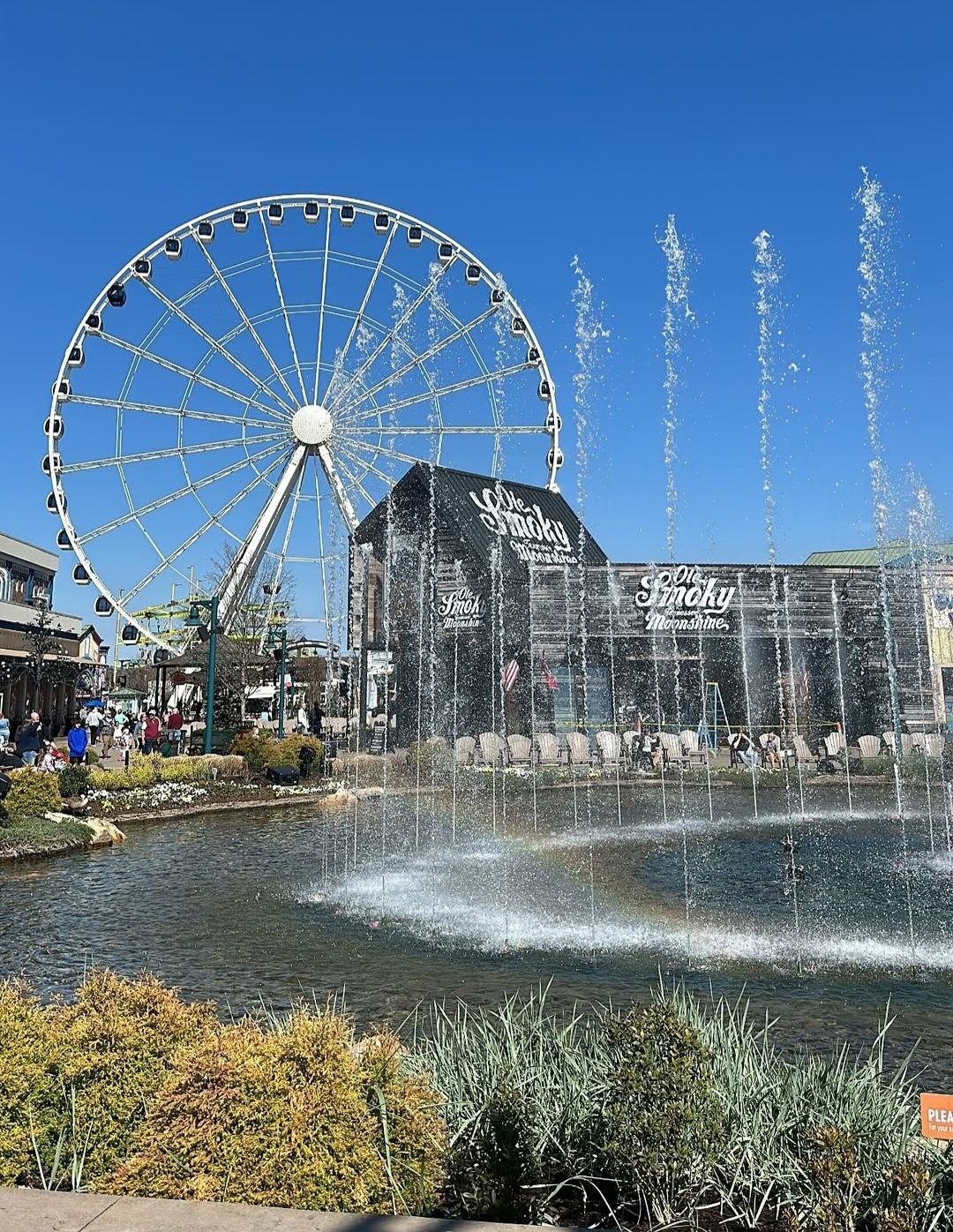
The Island in Pigeon Forge

== Arts and culture ==
Besides the natural environment of the area, the attractions in Pigeon Forge draw approximately 11 million visitors each year. Attractions include the Dollywood theme park and the Stampede theater, both owned by country music superstar Dolly Parton, whose home town is Sevierville, just a few miles from Pigeon Forge.

=== Tourism ===
- Buttonwillow Civil War Theater
- TopJump Trampoline & Extreme Arena
- Crave Golf Club
- Titanic Museum
- Cooter's Place
- Alcatraz East Crime Museum
- Southern Gospel Museum and Hall of Fame
- Country Tonite Theatre
- Paula Deen's Lumberjack Feud Supper Show & Adventure Park
- Comedy Barn Theater
- WonderWorks Children's Museum
- The Pigeon Perch
- Hatfield and McCoy Dinner Feud
- Dolly Parton's Stampede (Formerly Dixie Stampede)
- Biblical Times Dinner Theater
- Red Skelton Tribute Theater
- NASCAR Speedpark
- Smoky Mountain Alpine Coaster
- Jurassic Jungle Boat Ride
- Hollywood Wax Museum Pigeon Forge
- The Island in Pigeon Forge (featuring the Great Smoky Mountain Wheel)
- Tribute to Frank Sinatra & The Rat Pack
- Pigeon Forge Snow
- The Island Show Fountains
- American Oldies Theater
- Grand Majestic Dinner Theater
- Great Smoky Mountain Murder Mystery
- Ripken Experience
- Seasonal events such as Winterfest

=== Car and truck shows ===
Pigeon Forge has various entertainment opportunities for car and truck enthusiasts. The calendar of car and truck show events varies each year and has included:

- Spring Rod Run
- Chevy/GMC Truck Nationals
- Hooter's GMC/Chevy Truckin' Nationals
- Annual Smoky Mountain Classic Chevy Roundup
- Great Smoky Mountain Truck Show
- Great Smoky Mountain Jeep Invasion
- Silver Dollar Open Rod Run
- Pontiac Car Club Show
- Camaro, Chevelle, Nova Nationals
- Cobra Mustang Club
- Shades of the Past Hot Rod Roundup
- Fall Rod Run
- Smoky Mountain Model-A Car Rally
- Annual Pigeon Forge Starion/Conquest Meet
- Ford F-100 Super Nationals
- Annual Patriot Festival

== Parks and recreation ==
The Pigeon Forge Parks and Recreation Department manages the Pigeon Forks Community Center along with 134 acres (54 ha) of park land and approximately 2 miles (3.2 km) of greenways.

- Pigeon Forge City Park has sports fields and courts, walking trails, and large picnic areas.
- Patriot Park has 16 acres (65,000 m^{2}) and is the site of various special events, including Independence Day fireworks, Patriot Festival, and light displays during Winterfest.
- Wear Farm City Park is the main park for Pigeon Forge and has sports fields and courts along with playgrounds, pavilions, and concession stands.

== Government ==
Pigeon Forge has a City Manager-Commission form of government, in which a city manager, commission, and mayor work together to manage the city. As of 2026, the mayor is Kevin McClure, and the Vice Mayor is Jay Ogle.

== Infrastructure ==
The city government has 181 miles (290 km) of water main piping, hundreds of fire hydrants, 20 water tanks, 19 pump stations, 86 miles (138 km) of publicly maintained streets and roads, 89 miles (143 km) of sanitary sewers, and approximately 234 vehicles and 272 pieces of equipment.

=== Transportation ===
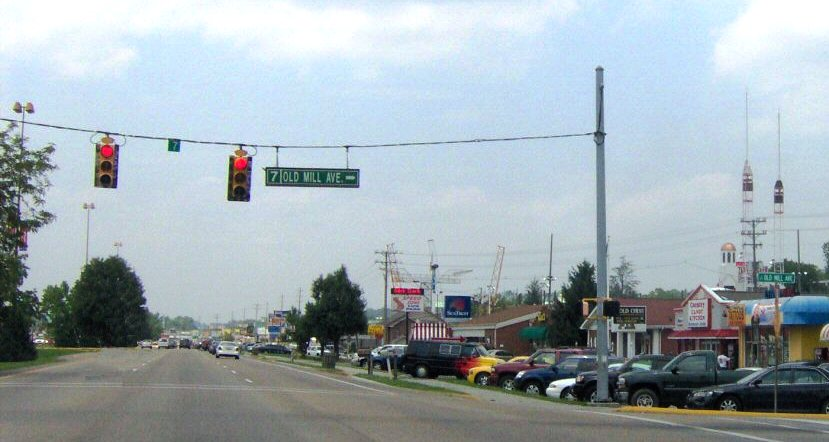
The Parkway (US 441) in Pigeon Forge

Pigeon Forge is served by a mass transit system of buses that are referred to as "Fun Time Trolleys" due to their physical resemblance to early 20th-century trolleys. The system operates more than 40 vehicles and has more than 200 stops throughout Pigeon Forge as well as in neighboring Gatlinburg and Sevierville. All the trolleys are equipped with lifts for mobility aids and wheelchairs.

U.S. Route 441, known as "The Parkway", runs through the middle of Pigeon Forge en route to Gatlinburg and Great Smoky Mountains National Park, where it crests at Newfound Gap before descending to Cherokee, North Carolina. The six-lane strip along US-441 contains most of Pigeon Forge's tourist attractions. U.S. Route 321 (known as Wears Valley Road in Pigeon Forge) connects the town with Wears Valley and Townsend to the west. Teaster Lane runs along the eastern side of the city and serves as a local four-lane road bypassing some of the Parkway and is relatively undeveloped, except a few shopping centers. TN-449 serves as a bypass for both Sevierville and most of Pigeon Forge and directly connects with Dollywood.

=== Utilities ===
The water plant in Pigeon Forge can treat 12,000,000 U.S. gallons (10,000,000 imp gal; 45,000,000 L) of water per day. The city storage system holds 8,300,000 U.S. gallons (6,900,000 imp gal; 31,000,000 L) of water. The city also supplies Gatlinburg with up to 1,500,000 U.S. gallons (1,200,000 imp gal; 5,700,000 L) of water per day.

== Education ==
Sevier County School District is the sole school district in the county.

Schools include:

- Pigeon Forge High School
- Pigeon Forge Junior High School
- Pigeon Forge Intermediate School
- Pigeon Forge Primary School

== Notable people ==
- Dolly Parton (1946 – 2026) — country music singer and songwriter, joint owner of Dollywood and Dolly Parton's Stampede
- Tara Thompson - country music singer
- Samuel Wear (1753–1817) — Revolutionary War veteran, co-founded the "Lost State of Franklin", helped draft Tennessee's state constitution
