= Titanic Museum (Branson, Missouri) =

Museum in Missouri, United States

The Titanic Museum
- Titanic Branson
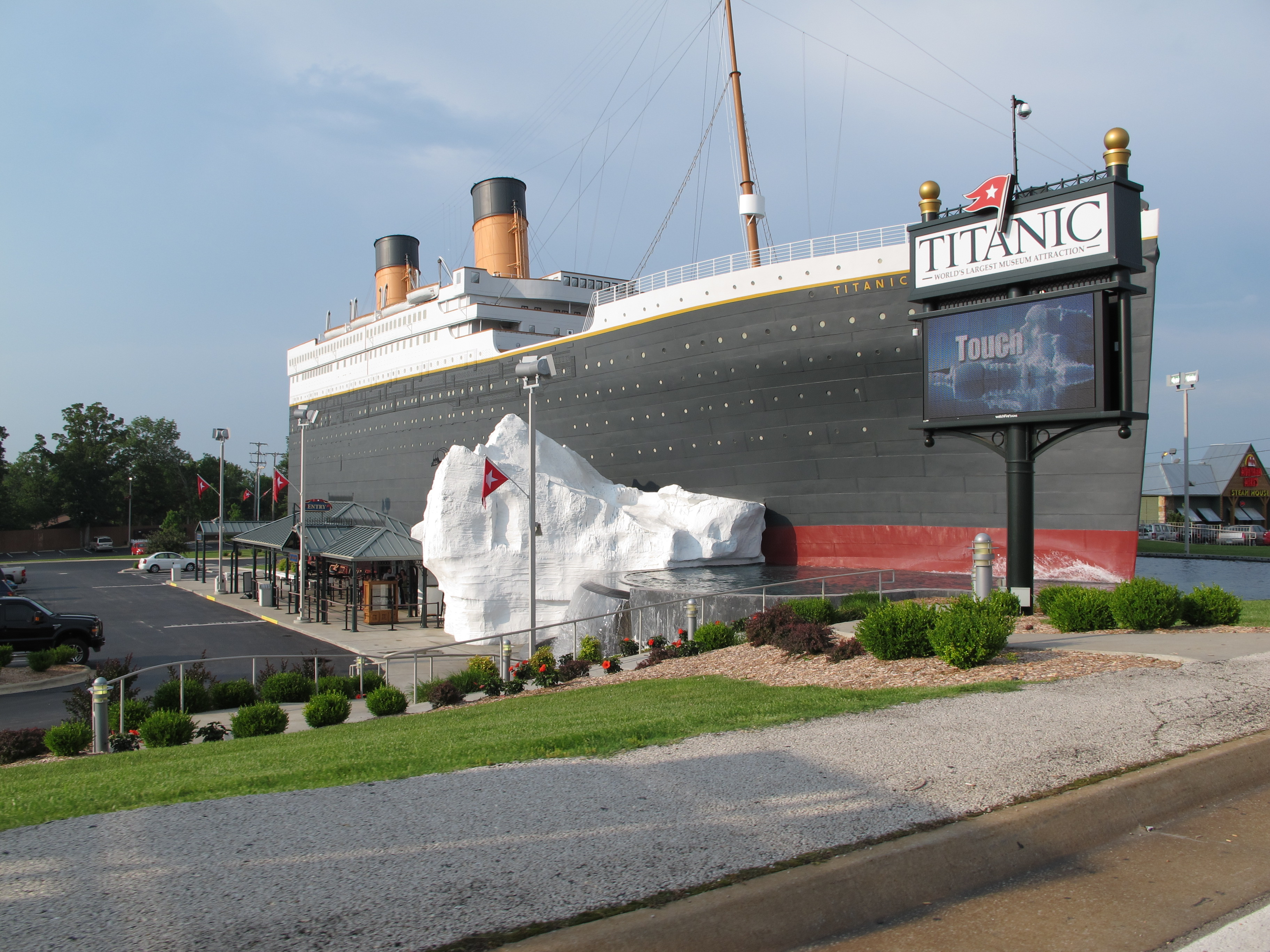
- The Titanic Museum
- Established: April 2006
- Location: 3235 76 Country Blvd & Hwy 165; Branson, Missouri, United States
- Coordinates: 36.638336°N 93.280229°W
- Curator: Paul Burns
- Owner: World Choice Investments, LLC
- Website: http://www.titanicattraction.com/

The Titanic Museum Attraction is a museum located in Branson, Missouri, United States, on 76 Country Boulevard. It is one of two Titanic-themed museums founded by John Joslyn (who headed a 1987 expedition to Titanic's final resting place); the other is located in Pigeon Forge, Tennessee. The museum holds 400 pre-discovery artifacts in 20 galleries.

Guests step through the artificial iceberg into the museum, and receive a passenger boarding ticket, featuring the name of an actual Titanic passenger or crewmember and a brief bio. During the tour, guests learn the individual stories of several passengers. The museum features a replica of the ship's First Class grand staircase, in which souvenir photos can be taken. At the end of the tour, guests are told whether their ticket holder survived.

Like the museum of Pigeon Forge, the museum's main exterior visual feature is the partial mockup of the original ocean liner. The construction consists of the front half of the ship, including its first two funnels.

In a 2017 episode of the Travel Channel series, Ghost Adventures, Zak Bagans and the crew investigated the museum due to claimed paranormal activities allegedly traced to actual relics from the shipwreck.

== See also ==
- Sinking of the RMS Titanic
- List of maritime museums in the United States
