= Titanic Museum (Pigeon Forge, Tennessee) =

Museum in Pigeon Forge, Tennessee, US

The Titanic Museum
- Titanic Pigeon Forge

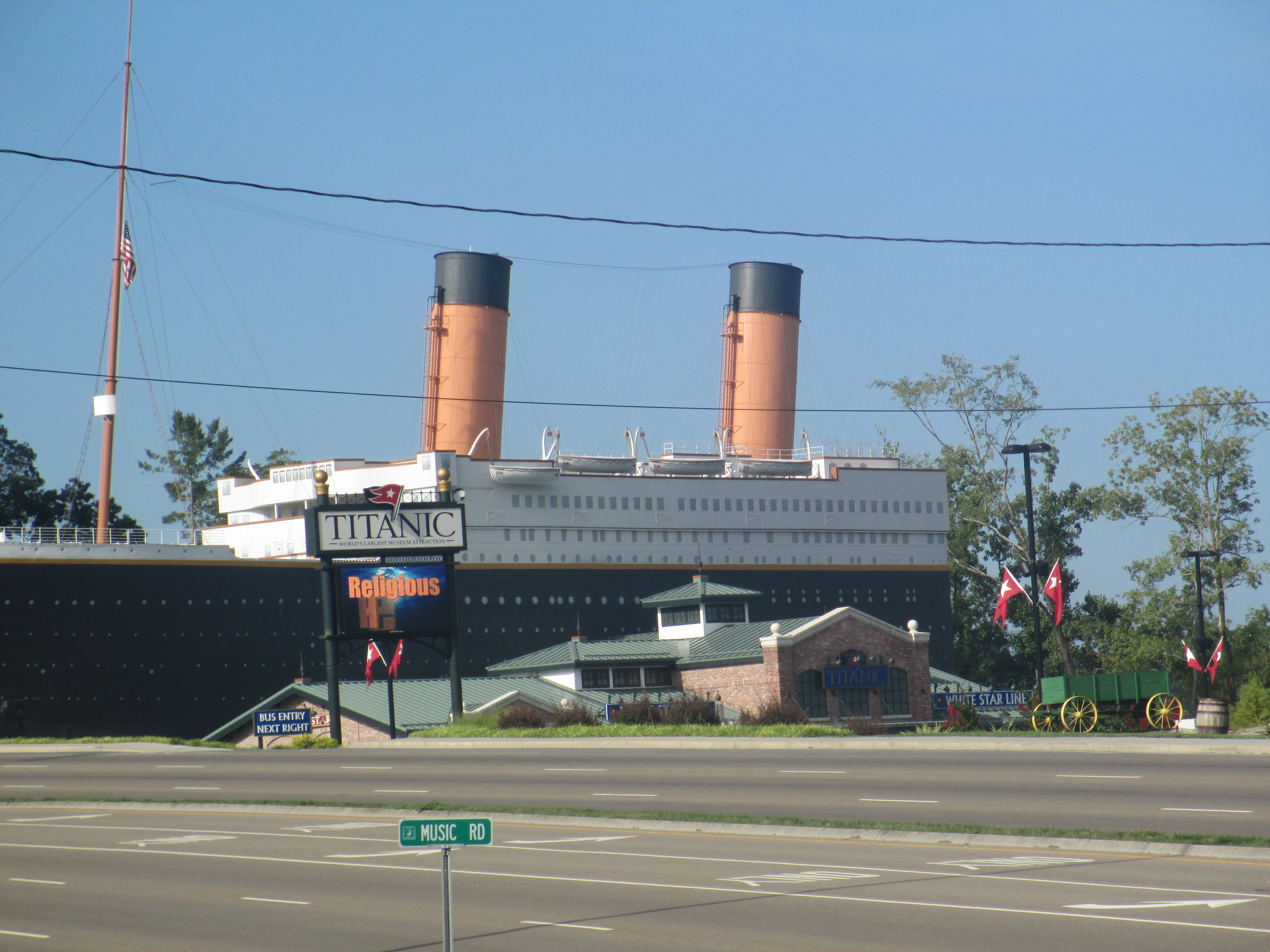
- The Titanic Museum

- 35.82055 N, -83.578935 W Titanic Museum (Pigeon Forge, Tennessee) (the United States)
- Established: April 8, 2010 (16 years ago)
- Location: 2134 Parkway; Pigeon Forge, Tennessee, United States
- Coordinates: 35.82055°N 83.578935°W
- Collection size: 400 personal and private artifacts
- Curator: Paul Burns
- Owners: World Choice Investments, LLC
- Website: titanicattraction.com

The Titanic Museum is a two-story museum shaped like the RMS Titanic. It is located in Pigeon Forge, Tennessee, United States, and opened on April 8, 2010. It is built half-scale to the original ship. Similar to the one in Branson, Missouri, the museum holds 400 pre-discovery artifacts in twenty galleries. It is the largest permanent Titanic museum in the world.

The structure is built in a pool to create the illusion of the Titanic at sea, and the 2-hour, self-guided tour is designed to give guests the sensation of being an original passenger on the Titanic's 1912 maiden voyage.

As guests enter, they are given a passenger boarding ticket. On this ticket is the name of an actual Titanic passenger and the class they were traveling. Guests will learn the individual stories of several passengers and crew members. The museum features a replica of the ship's First Class grand staircase, in which souvenir photos can be taken. In the Titanic Memorial Room, they will find out whether their ticketed passenger survived.

The structure was estimated to have cost $25 million to build. Starting in June of 2026 the museum now features an interactive Dinner Show Experience on the third floor.
