= Baird Mountain =

Mountain in Missouri, United States

Coordinates: 36°35′01″N 93°17′31″W

Baird Mountain is a summit in Taney County in southern Missouri. The peak has an elevation of 1,234 feet (376 m) The peak lies just southeast of the Table Rock Lake dam above Missouri Route 265. Table Rock State Park lies just to the west. Baird Mountain is where the United States Army Corps of Engineers quarried the rock to make all the concrete for Table Rock Dam. The rock was transported off Baird Mountain with a one-mile-long conveyor belt to the site of the dam.

Baird Mountain has the name of one Mr. Baird, a pioneer prospector.
