= Duck tour =

Tours on purpose-built amphibious vehicles

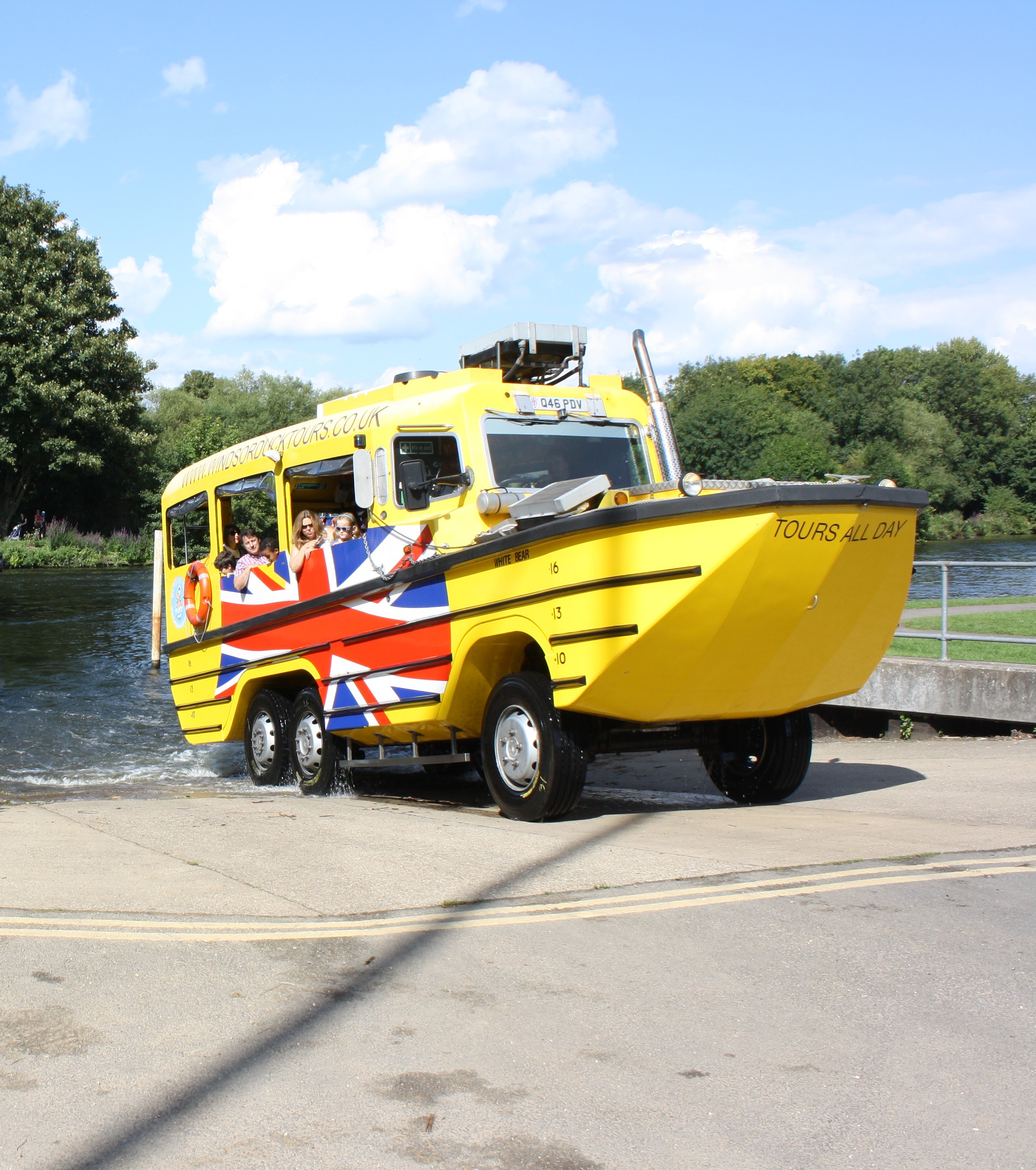
Windsor Duck Tours Seabozo Amphibious Vehicle

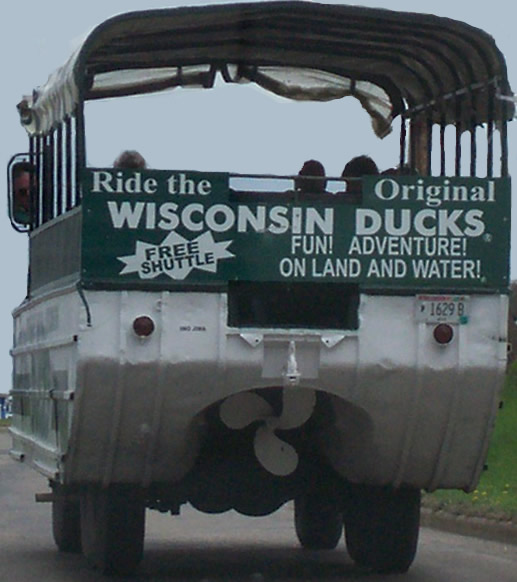
Original Wisconsin Duck from Wisconsin Dells, Wisconsin

Duck tours (or, more formally, amphibious tours), are tours that take place on purpose-built amphibious tour buses and (modified) surplus amphibious military vehicles, like DUKWs ("Ducks") and LARC-Vs. They are often offered as tourist attractions in harbor, seaman and lake cities.

== Origin and history ==
The first "duck tour" company was started in 1946 by Mel Flath and Bob Unger in Wisconsin Dells, Wisconsin. Flath's company has changed ownership since, but it is still in operation under the name Original Wisconsin Ducks. His family continues to operate a duck company called the Dells Army Ducks in the Wisconsin Dells Area.

== Regional operators ==
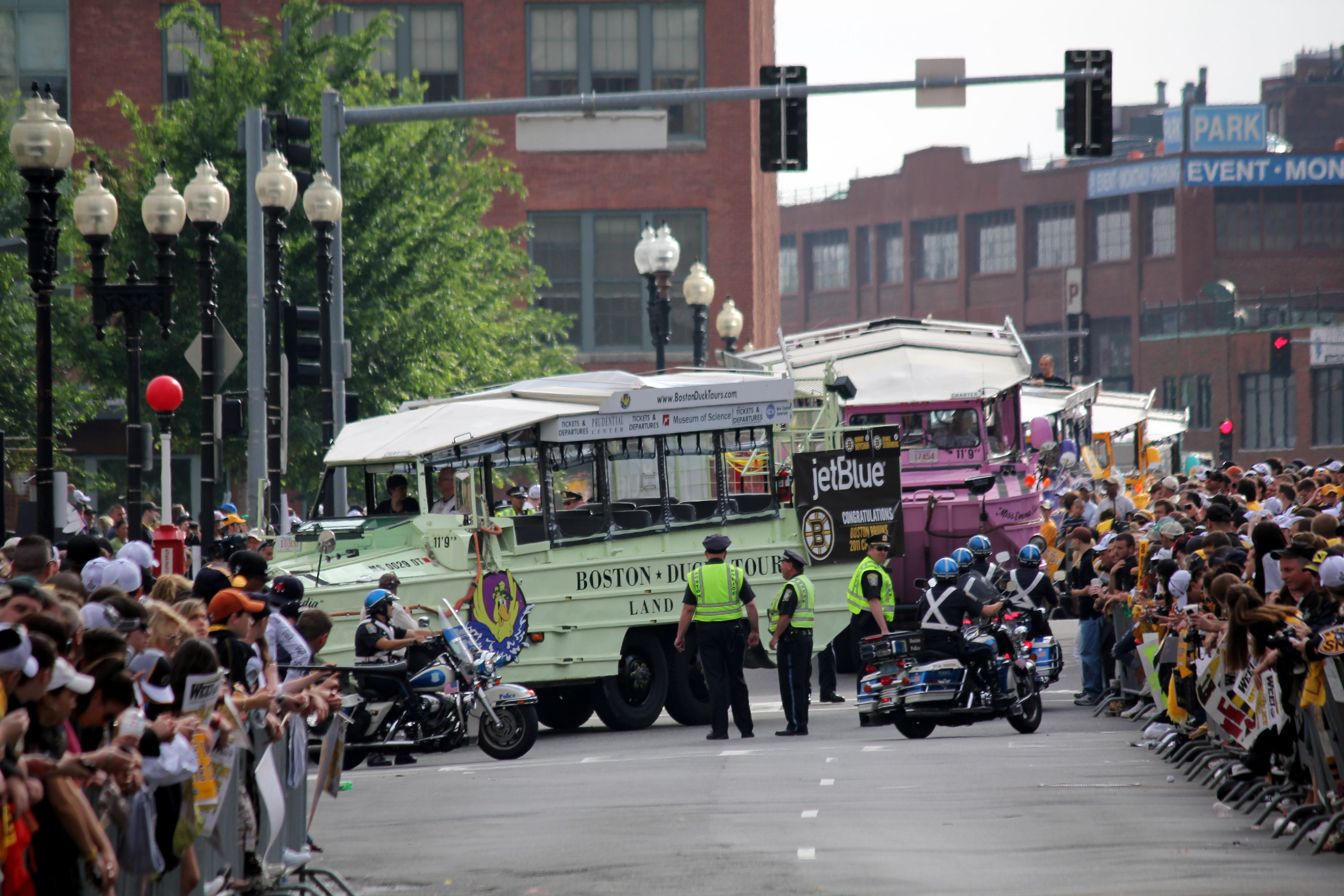
Boston Duck Tours DUKWs in the Boston Bruins 2011 Stanley Cup Finals victory parade

DUKWs operated by Boston Duck Tours have been used thirteen times since 1939 for "rolling rallies" to celebrate sports championships by New England–based local pro sports teams. There have been six for the New England Patriots (2002, 2004, 2005, 2015, 2017, 2019), four for the Boston Red Sox (2004, 2007, 2013, 2018), two for the Boston Celtics (2008, 2024), and one for the Boston Bruins (2011).

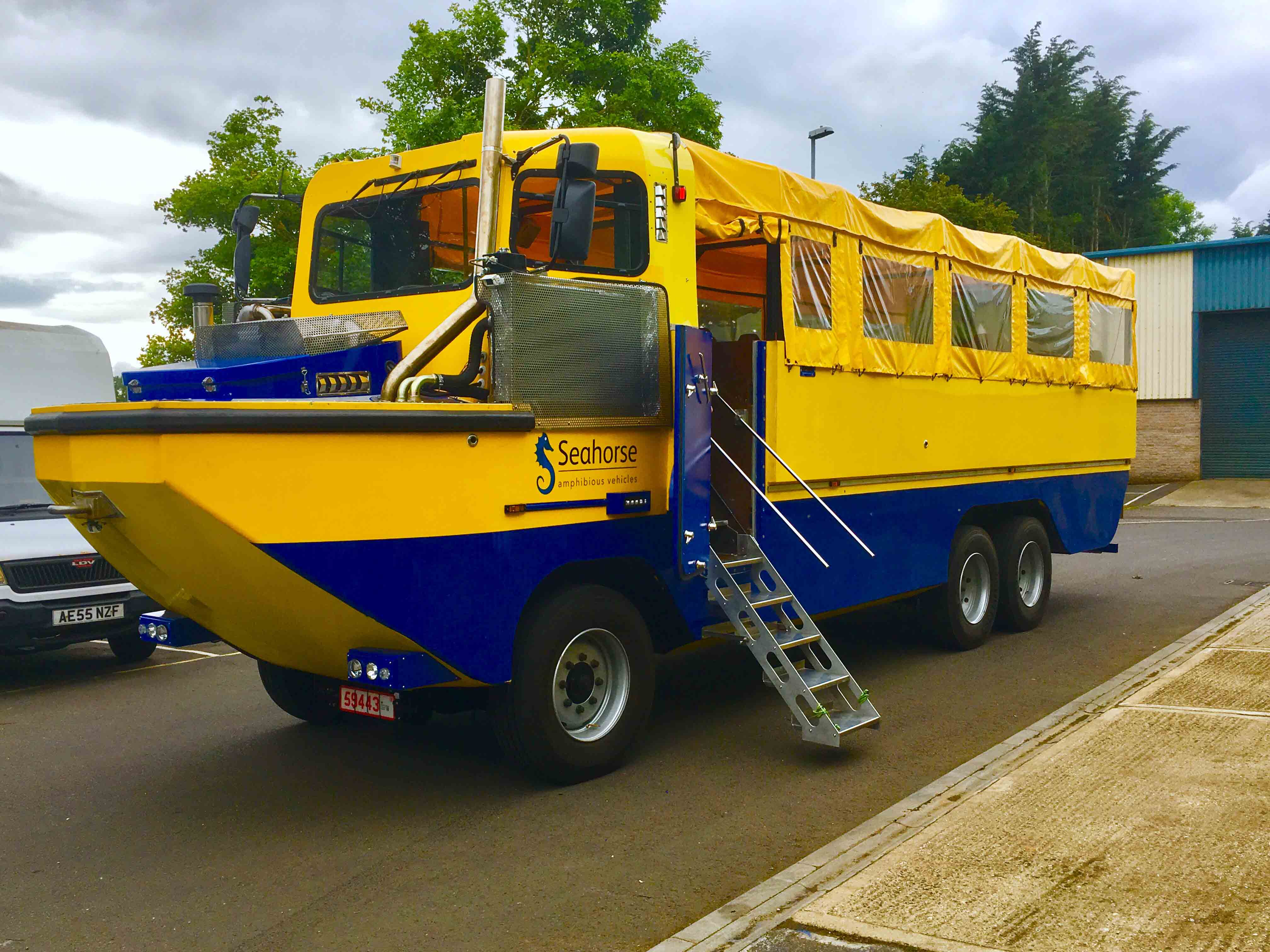
Seahorse Amphibious Vehicle MKIII 2018

The Duck Boats were first planned to be used for the New England Patriots in 1997 however they did not win Super Bowl XXXI. While much of the parade routes over the years consisted of the DUKWs staying on land, some featured the DUKWs traversing both the land and across the Charles River.

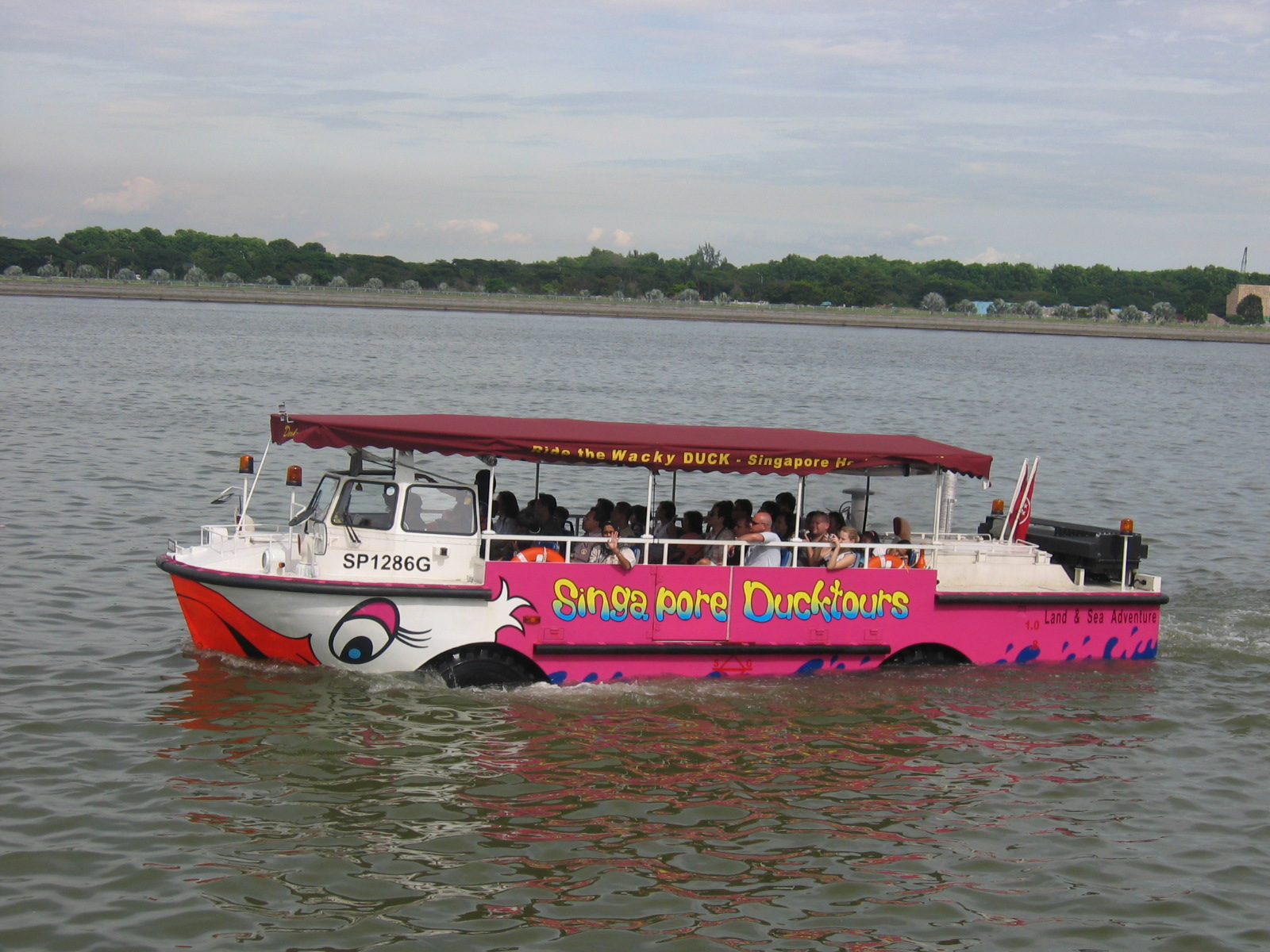
A Singapore "tour-duck" in water

The Seafair Pirates in Seattle use a DUKW "Moby Duck" modified to look like a Spanish Galleon as their primary means of amphibious transport.

Almost all have since been repainted and given modern diesel engines, and some have enclosed tops, making them more resemble conventional buses. Others are warm-weather only, open-air vehicles, with an optional canopy. Most require a bus-type Public Service Vehicle license and a passenger-use boat license.

In Australia at the Rainforestation Nature Park at Kuranda in Queensland a fleet of DEEZs are used to take visitors through a typical rain forest environment. The DEEZs travel along a tight twisty track through the forest before entering a small lake where their amphibious capabilities are demonstrated.

A heavily modified DEEZs, called "Normandie" has been in use at the Koksijde seaside (Belgium) for a number of decades, as a tourist sea excursion vehicle.

In Singapore, Singapore DUCKtours has been operating amphibious tours using modified LARC-Vs around the Civic District and the Marina Bay since 2002.

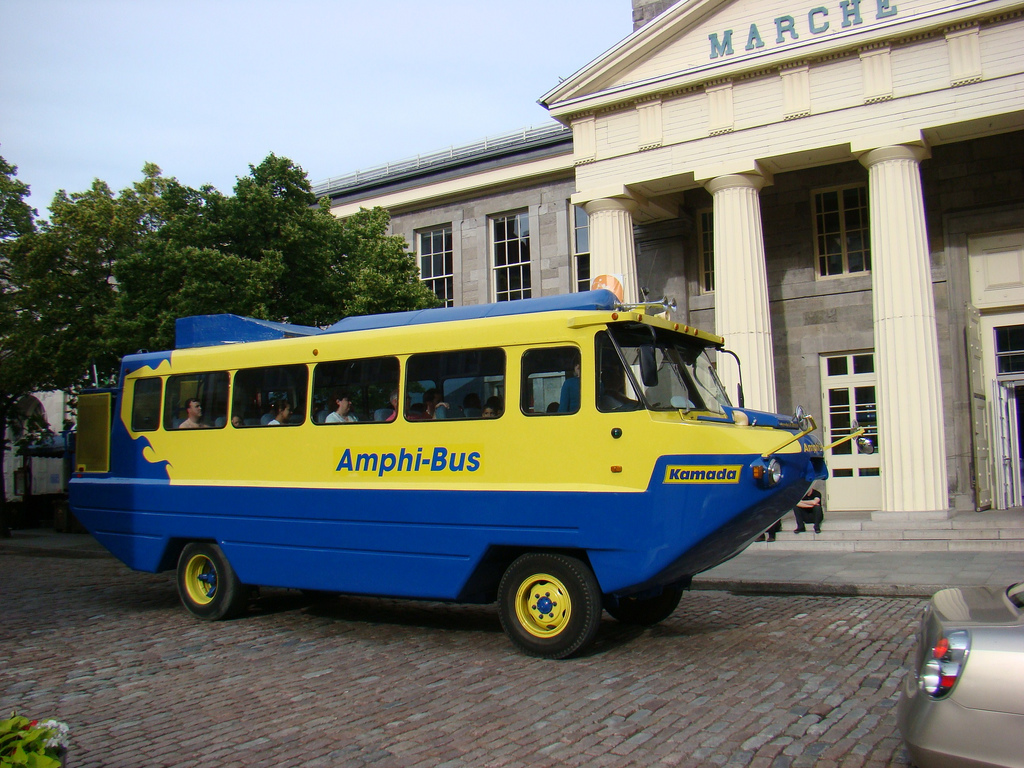
Montreal Amphi-bus

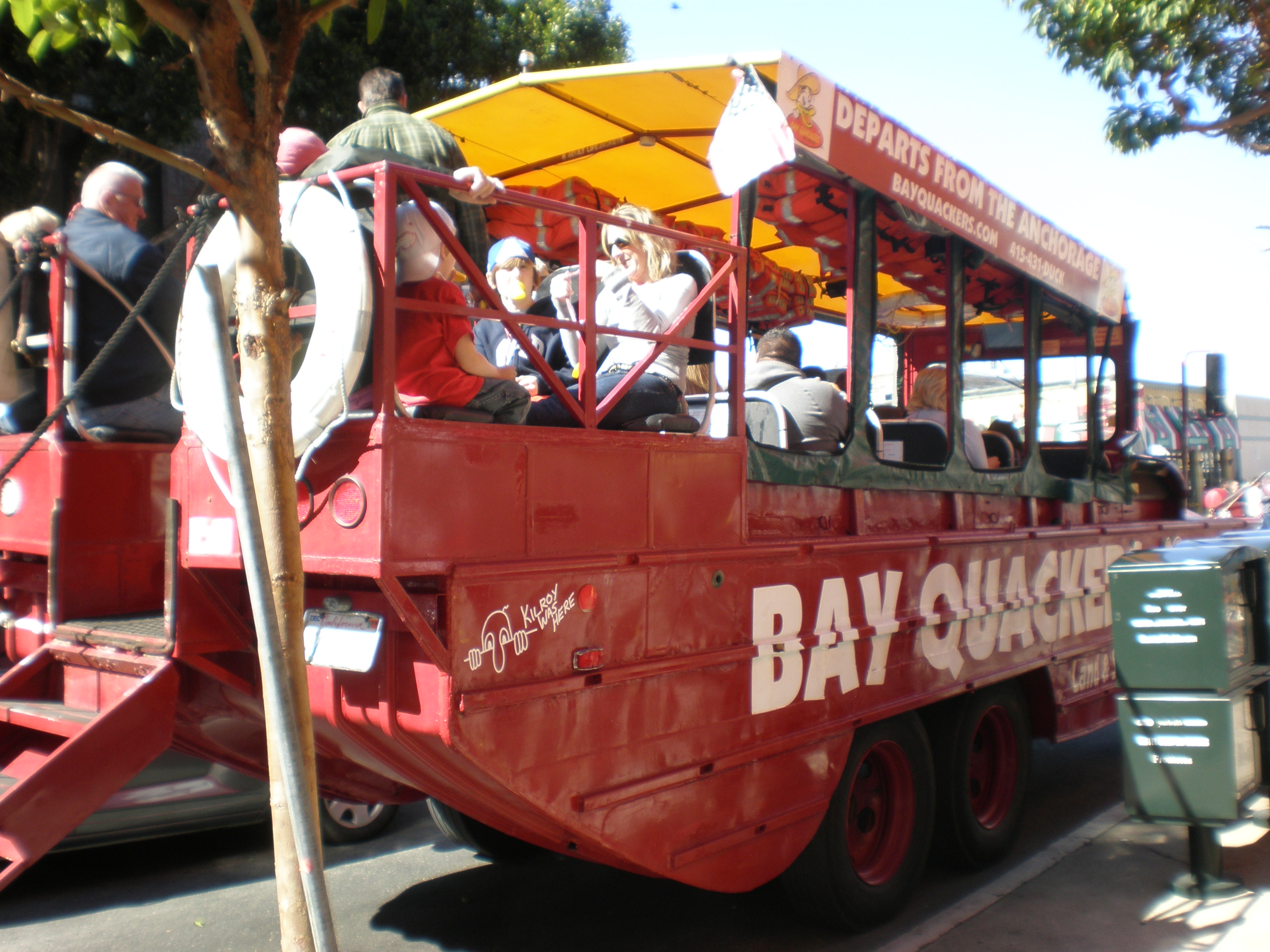
Bay Quackers DUKW 'Peking Duck" before a tour

== Former operators ==
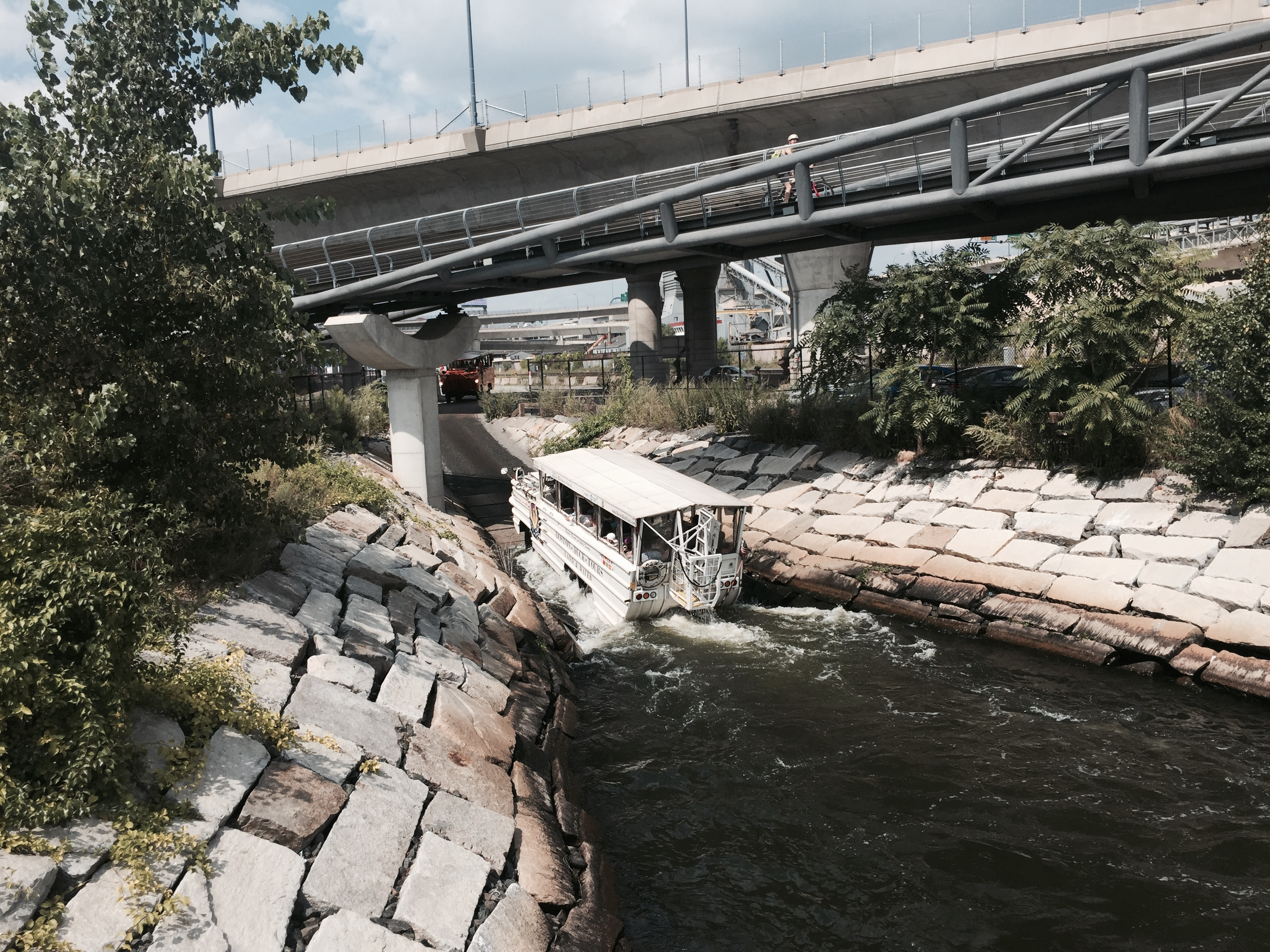
A Boston Duck Tour transitioning to land

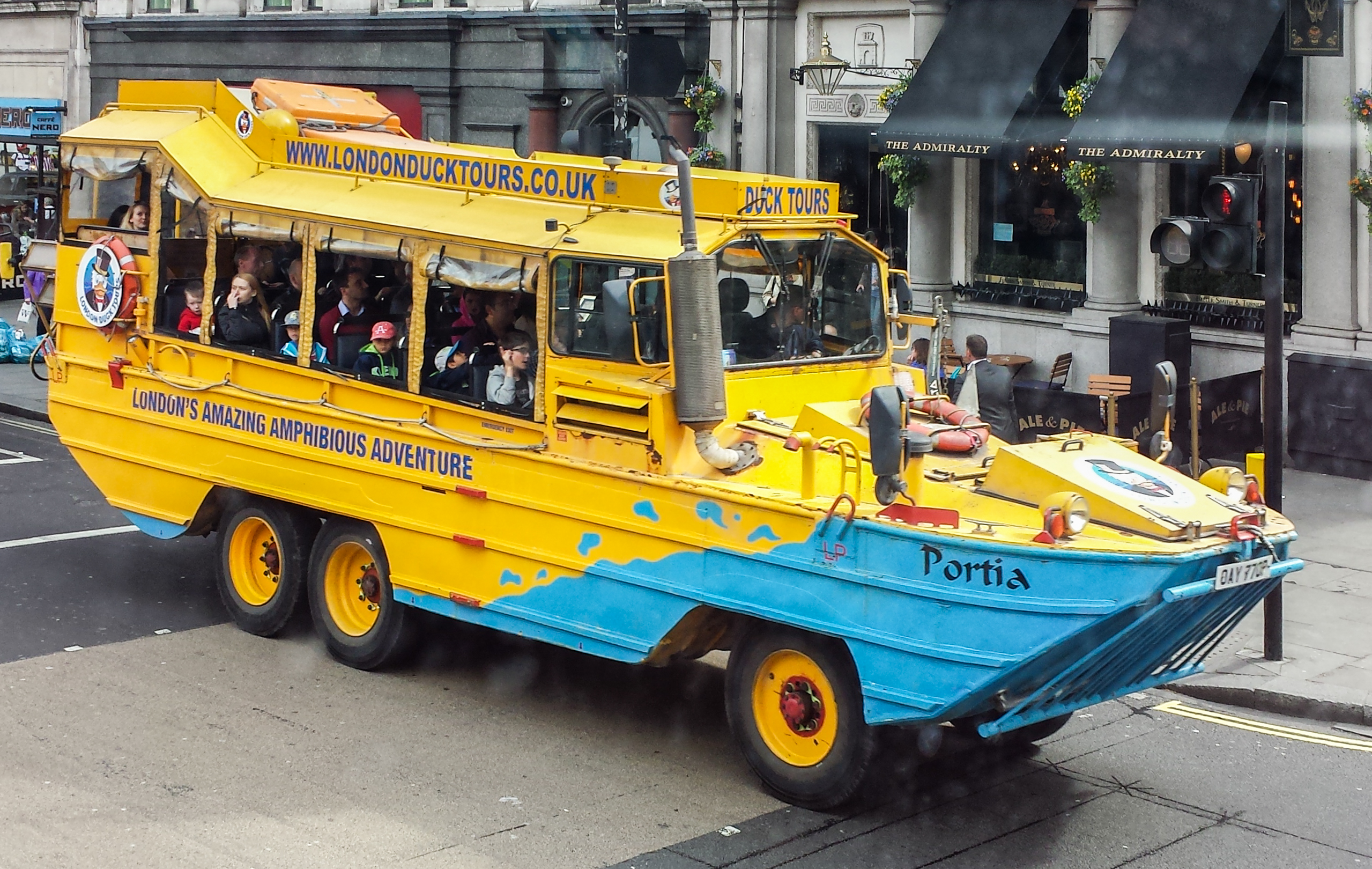
London Duck Tours

The "Normandie" in Koksijde (2018)

Propulsion system of the "Normandie"

San Francisco's 'Bay Quackers' operated from 2004 until 2011, splashing into San Francisco Bay near AT&T Park in modified DUKWs. They were targeted in a lawsuit by 'Ride the Ducks' for use of the quacker kazoos in a sound mark infringement case, however the lawsuit was later dropped.

Liverpool's 'Yellow Duckmarine' tours (a wordplay on the Beatles song Yellow Submarine) had 4 DUKWs in 2014, one of which saw service in the D-day landings. The service carried over two million passengers in its 13-year life and was ridden by Queen Elizabeth II during her Diamond Jubilee celebrations in 2012. These are no longer operating due to the liquidation of the company following two separate sinkings in 2013.

London's "London Duck Tours limited" owned 13 vessels prior to 2017, of which some saw action in D-day. They were operating DUKWs in the UK but closed on 18 September 2017.

== Safety ==
Duck boats based on the old WWII DUKW have a poor safety record and a large number of fatal incidents for the number of vehicles in service. This has resulted in calls to better regulate the vehicles, or in some cases, ban them altogether. According to Robert Mongeluzzi, the lawyer who represented nearly two dozen victims of civilian DUKW incidents, the vehicles "are deathtraps, [...] they are and were staggeringly dangerous."

The vehicles exist in a regulatory gray area, with different regulators for use on land and for use on water. On the water, the Coast Guard is the primary regulator in the United States, while on land, they are regulated by various state and local agencies. The National Transportation Safety Board, which investigates accidents, can recommend regulations but has no authority to implement them.

The DUKW vehicles were never intended to be used on public roadways, resulting in numerous blind spots where drivers are unable to see traffic hazards. On water, the boats have low freeboard, which makes them vulnerable to rapid sinking in poor weather, and the canopies often trap passengers on board as the boats sink. In addition, the duck boat vehicles are very old, replacement parts are difficult to find, and the vehicles are often poorly maintained.

Some measures have been passed to improve safety conditions. The City of Boston requires blind spot cameras and requires a second person on board to serve as a tour guide so that the driver is not distracted. However, the NTSB's safety recommendations after a 1999 fatal sinking in Hot Springs, Arkansas, have mostly been ignored.

=== Incidents ===
==== Fatal incidents ====
On May 1, 1999, a DUKW called the Miss Majestic sank on Lake Hamilton and Lake Catherine in Hot Springs, Arkansas, killing 13 of the 20 people on board. The NTSB listed the cause of the accident as a loose rubber seal near the drive shaft.

On June 23, 2002, the Lady Duck, a custom-built vehicle converted from a Ford F-350 pickup truck, sank while on a cruise on the Ottawa River in Ontario, Canada. Six passengers, the driver, and the tour guide escaped, but four passengers were trapped under the sunken vehicle's canopy and drowned. A review by the Transportation Safety Board of Canada found problems with regulating such vehicles and defects in the makeshift design and the emergency procedures.

On July 7, 2010, a regulated and modern Ride the Ducks amphibious bus (based on the original DUKW design and using an original DUKW chassis), was disabled by an engine fire and later run over by a barge, being towed by a tugboat on the Delaware River in Philadelphia. The operator of the tug pushing the barge was on his personal cell phone. Before the accident the Ride The Ducks captain made numerous calls to the tug to get the tug to change course. Those calls were heard and rebroadcast by other vessels, but there was no response from the operator of the tug. Thirty-three passengers and two crew members were quickly recovered, but two passengers, a 20-year-old man and a 16-year-old girl, both part of a tour group from Hungary, were killed. The NTSB determined that the probable cause of the accident was the tugboat mate's (responsible for driving the tug at the time) inattention to his duties. The tugboat mate was sentenced to 366 days in federal prison.

On May 8, 2015, a modern Ride the Ducks boat with an original DUKW chassis struck and killed a woman crossing the street in Philadelphia, Pennsylvania's Chinatown section. Witnesses at the scene say that the woman was distracted by her handheld tablet device and walked into the street against the red light and was struck while in the boat's front center blind spot. Although the police determined the driver was not at fault, the victim's husband sued the company and the city, saying that the blind spots of the vehicle and the placement of the traffic light contributed to her death. The lawsuit was settled in 2017 for an undisclosed amount.

On September 24, 2015, a modern Ride the Ducks vehicle with an original DUKW chassis in Seattle, Washington crashed into a charter bus on the Aurora Bridge, killing five passengers on the bus, critically injuring eight, and seriously injuring eight more. The cause of the accident was poor maintenance, that led to an axle breaking at high speed. The lack of a median barrier on the bridge made the accident more severe. The city and state settled their lawsuits surrounding the safety of the bridge for $4.4 million.

In the Table Rock Lake duck boat accident of July 19, 2018, near Branson, Missouri, 17 people died and 7 were injured after a DUKW capsized during a severe thunderstorm on Table Rock Lake. 29 passengers and two crew members were on the boat. The NTSB accident report found that the boats' low freeboard and open interior make duck boats "vulnerable to rapid swamping and sinking" when they are suddenly flooded. The safety report also found that a fixed canopy and closed side curtain impeded passenger escape and likely caused more deaths.

==== Non-fatal incidents ====
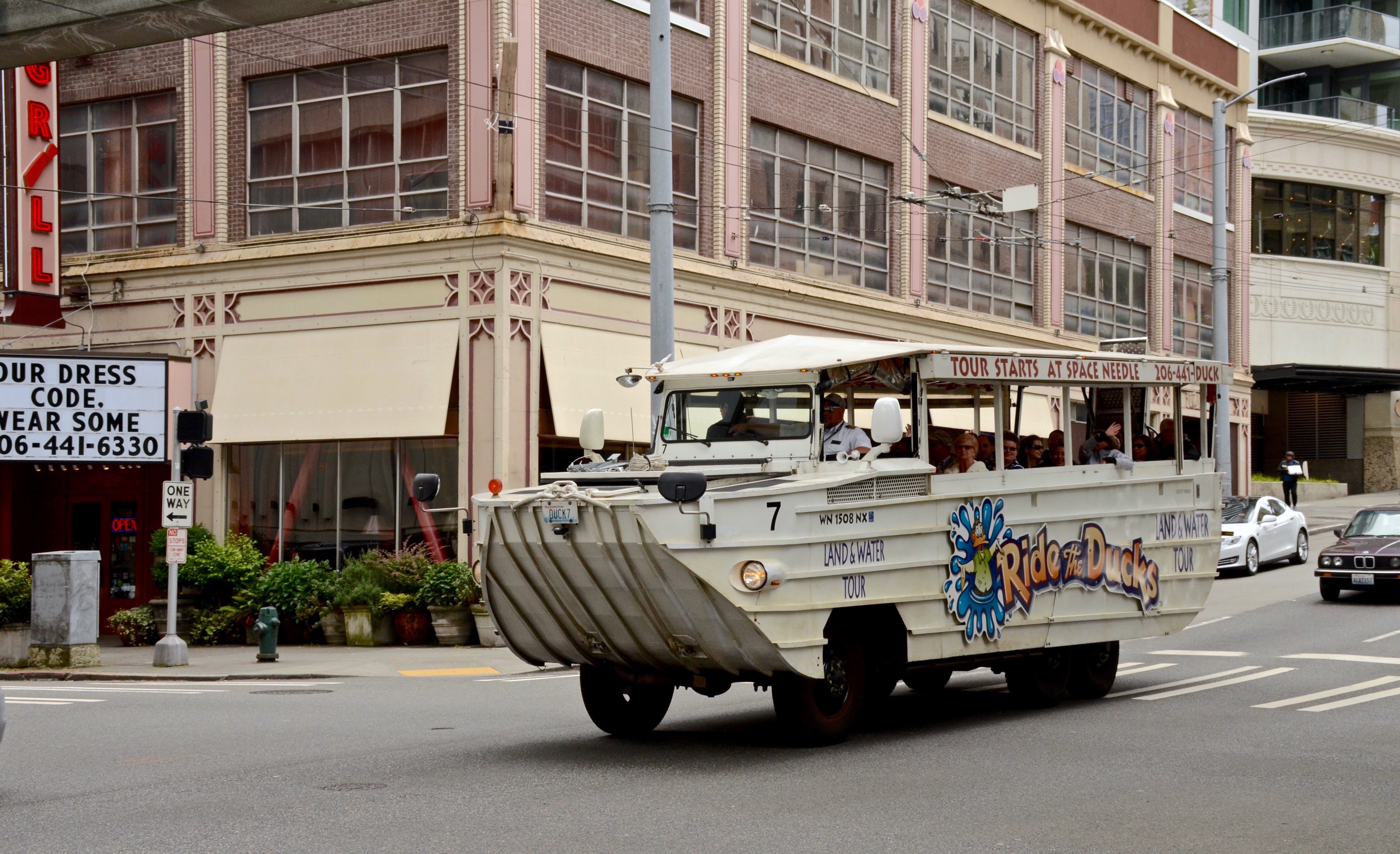
A duck boat in downtown Seattle in 2016

On March 30, 2013, a duck boat of The Yellow Duckmarine in Liverpool sank in the city's Salthouse Dock during a tour. All passengers were safely transferred to a pontoon before the vehicle began to sink. In June 2013 another duck boat, operated by the same company, sank in the Albert Dock as it came to the end of a tour of Liverpool. Passengers were forced to jump into the water as the vehicle rapidly took on water. Some were rescued by vessels while others swam to the side of the dock. Out of the 31 people on board, 27 were treated in hospital for minor injuries. The incident resulted in the Maritime and Coastguard Agency withdrawing all safety certificates for the craft owned by Pearlwild and their entering administration. Pearlwild are also under investigation by the North West Traffic Commissioner over the operation of the Duckmarines during 2012.

On September 29, 2013, a duck boat on the River Thames in London caught fire. Thirty people were rescued, a number of them after having jumped into the river to escape the fire. An investigation by the Marine Accident Investigation Branch determined that the fire had been caused by ignition of additional buoyancy foam added to the DUKW following the Liverpool incident, due to obstruction of airflow within the mechanical compartments and friction between the foam and moving parts.

== Trademark ==
The phrase "duck tour" and some duck cartoon images have been deemed generic and not trademark-able by the First Circuit Court of Appeals in the United States.
