= 2018 Iowa tornado outbreak =

Weather event in Iowa, United States

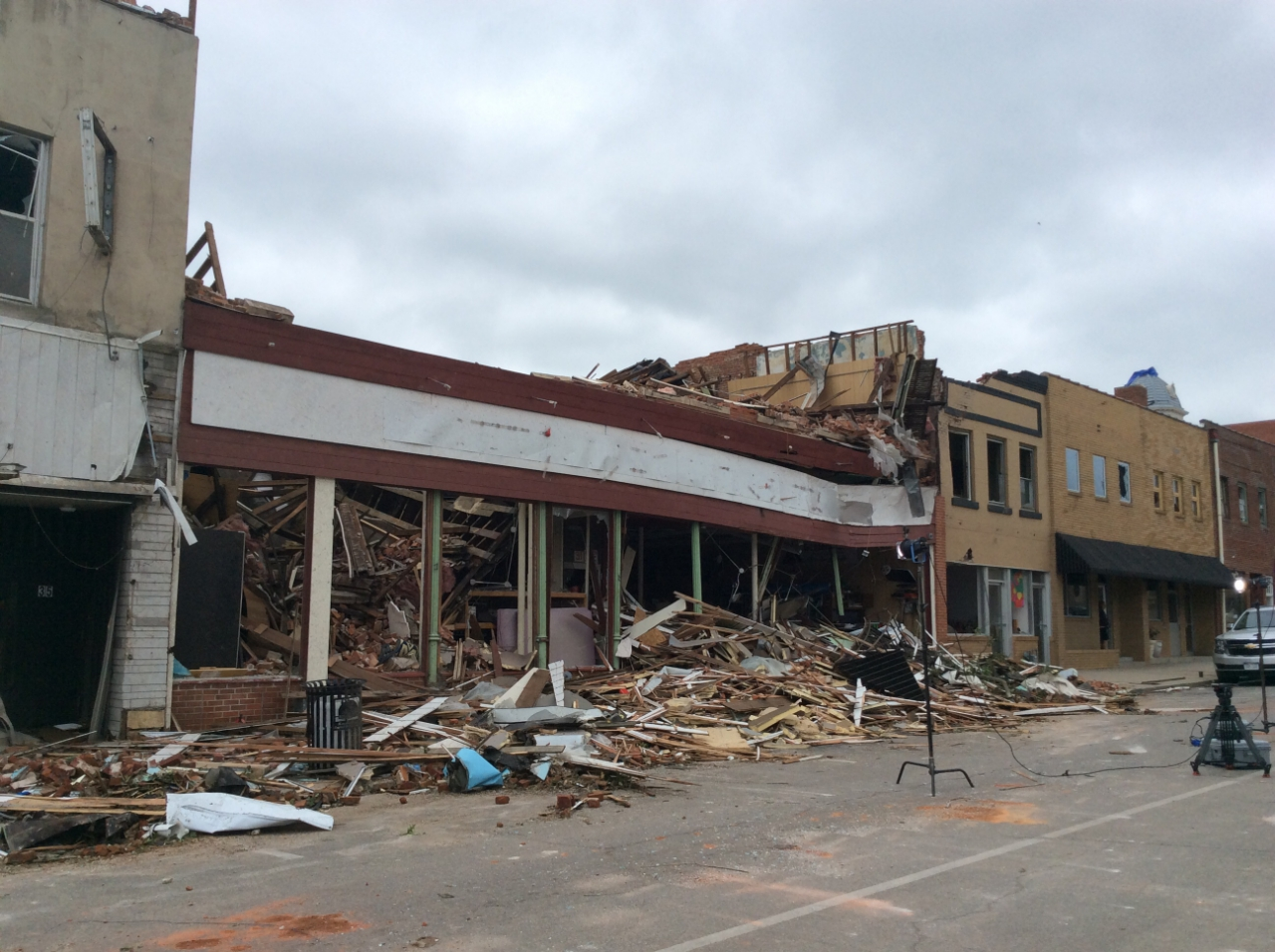
- EF3 damage to brick businesses in Marshalltown, Iowa.

Meteorological history
- Formed: July 19, 2018
- Dissipated: July 20, 2018

Tornado outbreak
- Tornadoes: 32
- Max. rating: EF3 tornado
- Duration: 33 hours, 14 minutes
- Highest winds: 144 mph (232 km/h)

Overall effects
- Fatalities: 0 (+17 non-tornadic),
- Injuries: 36 (+1 indirect)
- Damage: $321.385 million (2018 USD)
- Areas affected: Midwestern United States
- Part of the Tornadoes of 2018

On July 19 and 20, 2018, an unexpected strong tornado outbreak affected Iowa and nearby areas. The event was triggered mostly by three supercells that produced several tornadoes across southeastern Iowa east and southeast of Des Moines. Two of the tornadoes reached EF3 intensity, affecting Pella and Marshalltown. These were the strongest tornadoes to hit Iowa since June 22, 2015, when another EF3 tornado struck near Lovilia. Of the 36 injuries, 13 occurred in Pella, 22 in Marshalltown, and one the following day in Indiana. One indirect injury also occurred in Marshalltown. The event was also notable due to the Table Rock Lake duck boat accident that killed 17 people and injured 7 others at Table Rock Lake, Missouri.

== Meteorological history ==
The tornado outbreak, as well as the other severe weather on July 19, was either poorly forecasted or essentially unforecasted; the outlook from the Storm Prediction Center that day had much of eastern Iowa under a 2% risk area for tornadoes. The outbreak was produced by a closed 700 mb low moved east-southeast over Minnesota and Iowa, with cool air aloft sliding southeast above very warm and moist air at the surface, resulting in strong instability for the system. A surface warm front was also analyzed to branch off an occluded front that was moving through northern Iowa, which generated low-level wind shear that produced conditions favorable enough to spawn tornadoes. However, while the overall environment was well analyzed, what was not well taken into account was the unusual attributes of how the ingredients would come together that afternoon. The system exhibited attributes of a cold-core low, which is typically seen for lows closed at 500 mb rather than 700 mb since these lows are stronger aloft than at the surface. The lower-than-normal altitude of this low led to colder air flowing at a much lower altitude than what is typically over dewpoints in the 70s°F (20s°C), which is moist for this type of event. These unusual environmental aspects were not picked up well by the HRRR model, and while it did hint at the development of two supercells in the eastern part of the state, the initiation of storms occurred at around 2 pm CDT in central Iowa, two to three hours earlier and further west than expected. The larger than normal CAPE and low-level instability allowed these storms to rapidly intensify and become tornadic quickly, which allowed these storms to quickly evolve into supercells that became rooted in the favorable environment.

As the event began, several weak supercells formed over central Iowa and moved eastward, producing multiple weak tornadoes. However, one supercell produced two simultaneous EF2 tornadoes in Bondurant. Shortly afterwards, a tornado watch was issued for the region from 3:10–10 pm CDT. However, a significant tornado outbreak was still not expected as the threat for tornadoes was only increased to 5% at the 20:00 UTC outlook, indicating the threat of only a couple of tornadoes. At 21:00 UTC (4 pm CDT), a large Storm-Relative Helicity (SRH) and low-level wind shear were reported across the region. Around this time, the southernmost storm evolved into a large tornadic supercell and moved southeastward, producing several tornadoes, including an EF3 tornado that passed near Pella. The Bondurant supercell then weakened, but another strong supercell developed to its north and absorbed it as it moved eastward. Fueled by an interaction with an outflow boundary from the southern supercell, the storm produced a large, wedge EF3 tornado that directly struck the town of Marshalltown. Afterwards, the northern supercell and the storms north of it weakened, but the southern supercell continued southeastward and eventually transitioned into a small squall line.

As the system trekked eastwards into July 20, damaging winds and hail became the main threat, with a 30% chance of strong winds across much of Arkansas, Tennessee and Kentucky, and a 45% chance of damaging hail across central Tennessee and Kentucky. However, a 10% tornado risk was also issued for western Tennessee and eastern Kentucky, with the threat of tornadoes stretching from western Arkansas to southern Michigan. An EF1 tornado in Indiana caused an injury to a camper, who was flipped over. However, that was the only casualty, as no tornadoes that day were stronger than EF1 intensity.

== Confirmed tornadoes ==
Confirmed tornadoes by Enhanced Fujita rating
EFU	EF0	EF1	EF2	EF3	EF4	EF5	Total
0	22	6	2	2	0	0	32

=== July 19 event ===
List of confirmed tornadoes – Thursday, July 19, 2018 (Note: All dates are based on the local time zone where the tornado touched down; however, all times are in Coordinated Universal Time for consistency.)
EF#	Location	County / Parish	State	Start Coord.	Time (UTC)	Path length	Max width
EF0	WNW of Ceylon	Martin	MN	43.54°N 94.67°W	17:45–17:56	0.21 mi (0.34 km)	10 yd (9.1 m)
EF0	A tornado was reported in the area with trees downed.						
EF0	S of Clarion (1st tornado)	Wright	IA	42.6457°N 93.7965°W	19:30–19:37	3.5 mi (5.6 km)	80 yd (73 m)
EF0	A tornado damaged crops.						
EF0	S of Clarion (2nd tornado)	Wright	IA	42.5791°N 93.7789°W	19:35–19:47	4.43 mi (7.13 km)	80 yd (73 m)
EF0	A tornado was photographed to the south of Clarion. Only crop damage occurred.						
EF0	NE of Woolstock	Wright	IA	42.5806°N 93.7128°W	19:42–19:45	1.28 mi (2.06 km)	60 yd (55 m)
EF0	High-resolution satellite imagery confirmed a tornado over agricultural areas.						
EF0	Northeastern Ankeny	Polk	IA	41.7394°N 93.5732°W	19:48–19:49	0.88 mi (1.42 km)	50 yd (46 m)
EF0	Several trees, fencing, and pieces of playground equipment were damaged by this weak tornado.						
EF2	N of Bondurant	Polk	IA	41.7246°N 93.4951°W	19:50–20:02	3.68 mi (5.92 km)	130 yd (120 m)
EF2	This low-end EF2 tornado occurred simultaneously with the tornado below. A well-built metal outbuilding had most of its roof removed and sustained the collapse of two walls. Numerous trees were snapped or uprooted, and severe crop damage occurred along the path.						
EF2	Bondurant	Polk	IA	41.7008°N 93.5037°W	19:51–20:00	2.95 mi (4.75 km)	100 yd (91 m)
EF2	This low-end EF2 tornado, which developed as a twin to the tornado above, moved through residential areas in Bondurant. One home had its second story blown off, a few homes had major roof damage, and other homes sustained less severe damage. An unanchored detached garage was swept away, and vehicles were overturned as well.						
EF0	W of Story City	Story	IA	42.1727°N 93.6592°W	19:52–19:57	2.07 mi (3.33 km)	40 yd (37 m)
EF0	This rope tornado remained over open country, causing only crop damage.						
EF0	N of Blairsburg	Hamilton	IA	42.4887°N 93.656°W	19:56–20:05	2.67 mi (4.30 km)	60 yd (55 m)
EF0	A weak tornado north of Blairsburg damaged crops.						
EF0	NW of Prairie City	Jasper	IA	41.6293°N 93.334°W	20:18–20:24	2.35 mi (3.78 km)	60 yd (55 m)
EF0	This was the first tornado produced by the Pella supercell. It remained over open farm fields, causing no damage.						
EF0	NE of Roland	Story	IA	42.1789°N 93.4856°W	20:22–20:30	2.79 mi (4.49 km)	60 yd (55 m)
EF0	High-resolution satellite imagery confirmed a tornado with damage to crops.						
EF0	SE of Prairie City	Jasper	IA	41.573°N 93.2186°W	20:28–20:34	2.62 mi (4.22 km)	80 yd (73 m)
EF0	This was the second tornado produced by the Pella supercell. Crops and trees were damaged along the path.						
EF0	NE of Collins	Story	IA	41.9202°N 93.3002°W	20:35–20:40	2.48 mi (3.99 km)	40 yd (37 m)
EF0	High-resolution satellite imagery confirmed a tornado with damage to crops.						
EF1	E of Monroe	Jasper, Marion	IA	41.5286°N 93.0643°W	20:45–20:52	3.96 mi (6.37 km)	500 yd (460 m)
EF1	This was the third tornado produced by the Pella supercell. A machine shed lost a small part of its roof, and trees and crops were damaged.						
EF0	E of Otley	Marion	IA	41.4752°N 92.9801°W	20:56–20:58	0.99 mi (1.59 km)	40 yd (37 m)
EF0	A brief tornado caused little to no damage.						
EF3	Eastern Pella	Marion	IA	41.4602°N 92.9371°W	21:01–21:24	9.17 mi (14.76 km)	800 yd (730 m)
EF3	The fourth produced by the Pella supercell, this intense cone tornado clipped the eastern edge of Pella, causing major structural damage to large factory buildings at the Vermeer plant complex, where a celebration for the company's 70th anniversary was being held. Reinforced masonry exterior walls were bowed in and collapsed at this location, metal support beams were severely bent, and large amounts of roofing was peeled from the buildings and scattered. Numerous vehicles, semi-trailers, and pieces of machinery were thrown and mangled at the plant, some of which were found piled atop each other and wrapped in sheet metal. Outside of town, barns were destroyed and a wide swath of corn was flattened in farm fields. A two-story farm home was shifted off of its foundation, and an addition to the south side of the house was destroyed. A few other homes sustained less severe damage. Thirteen people were injured.						
EF0	E of Clemons	Marshall	IA	42.1045°N 93.1332°W	21:11–21:13	0.85 mi (1.37 km)	40 yd (37 m)
EF0	High-resolution satellite imagery confirmed a tornado with damage to crops. The same storm produced the EF3 Marshalltown tornado.						
EF0	NE of Pella	Mahaska	IA	41.4188°N 92.8571°W	21:15–21:18	1.16 mi (1.87 km)	60 yd (55 m)
EF0	A satellite tornado to the Pella EF3 tornado damaged crops. This was the fifth tornado produced by the Pella supercell.						
EF3	W of Marietta to Marshalltown	Marshall	IA	42.0829°N 93.0275°W	21:24–21:47	8.41 mi (13.53 km)	1,200 yd (1,100 m)
EF3	See section on this tornado – There were 22 direct injuries and one indirect injury.						
EF0	S of Oskaloosa	Mahaska	IA	41.2285°N 92.6102°W	21:50–21:53	1.24 mi (2.00 km)	60 yd (55 m)
EF0	High-resolution satellite imagery confirmed a tornado with damage to crops. This was the sixth tornado produced by the Pella supercell.						
EF1	NNE of Keosauqua (1st tornado)	Van Buren	IA	40.803°N 91.9699°W	23:07–23:15	2.14 mi (3.44 km)	50 yd (46 m)
EF1	Twin tornadoes formed near Keosauqua, with this being the first one. A large historic stone barn was destroyed. Trees, a cornfield, and a small farm outbuilding were damaged. This was the seventh tornado produced by the Pella supercell.						
EF1	NNE of Keosauqua (2nd tornado)	Van Buren	IA	40.7482°N 91.9567°W	23:09–23:11	0.19 mi (0.31 km)	75 yd (69 m)
EF1	Twin tornadoes formed near Keosauqua, with this being the second one. Several large farm outbuildings and equipment were destroyed. Corn crops were damaged. This was the final tornado produced by the Pella supercell.						

=== July 20 event ===
List of confirmed tornadoes – Friday, July 20, 2018
EF#	Location	County / Parish	State	Start Coord.	Time (UTC)	Path length	Max width
EF0	NW of Camdenton	Camden	MO	38.07°N 92.87°W	09:32–09:33	0.12 mi (0.19 km)	75 yd (69 m)
EF0	Numerous trees were uprooted and tree limbs were snapped. Power lines were downed as well.						
EF0	SW of Bremen	Marshall	IN	41.3823°N 86.2197°W	17:53–17:55	0.5 mi (0.80 km)	50 yd (46 m)
EF0	A barn sustained damage to its cinder block exterior wall, corn was flattened, and some tree branches were broken.						
EF0	WNW of Wautoma	Waushara	WI	44.0624°N 89.2517°W	17:55–17:56	0.08 mi (0.13 km)	10 yd (9.1 m)
EF0	A small tornado snapped branches off of several pine trees and tossed them into the air.						
EF0	N of Salem	Washington	IN	38.6336°N 86.1095°W	18:03–18:05	1.1 mi (1.8 km)	75 yd (69 m)
EF0	A weak and intermittent tornado downed a few tree limbs and small fences. Multiple metal roof panels were ripped from a barn, while its overhead garage doors were blown in and the entrance door was ripped off. A house sustained considerable damage to its siding and roof, a small play shed was destroyed, and corn was flattened in a field.						
EF1	S of Corydon	Harrison	IN	38.1527°N 86.1501°W	18:04–18:20	6 mi (9.7 km)	250 yd (230 m)
EF1	A multiple-vortex tornado impaled a wooden two-by-eight plank into a concrete grain silo, extensively damaged four large barns, and caused significant tree damage. One tree fell on a garage, several homes sustained substantial roof damage, a pole barn was completely destroyed, and a truck and horse trailer was twisted and moved 50 ft (15 m). Corn crops were flattened, a camper was tossed and flipped over, and single-wide trailers were flipped over as well.						
EF0	N of La Fontaine	Wabash	IN	40.7281°N 85.7180°W	19:14–19:15	0.8 mi (1.3 km)	25 yd (23 m)
EF0	A brief tornado ripped the roof from an outbuilding and snapped or uprooted trees.						
EF1	Moonville	Madison	IN	40.1954°N 85.6115°W	19:50–19:52	0.6 mi (0.97 km)	30 yd (27 m)
EF1	A barn was destroyed, a storage shed was flipped onto its side, and trees in town were damaged.						
EF0	ESE of Sweetwater	Miami-Dade	FL	25.7608°N 80.3623°W	20:22–20:24	0.19 mi (0.31 km)	20 yd (18 m)
EF0	Trees, mailboxes, street signs, canopies, and basketball hoops all sustained minor damage from a brief tornado that eventually became a waterspout over a large retention pond before lifting.						
EF0	SE of Edmonton	Metcalfe	KY	36.9614°N 85.5931°W	23:03–23:05	2.1 mi (3.4 km)	60 yd (55 m)
EF0	A carport was overturned and two metal outbuildings lost roofing material. A double-wide mobile home was shifted off its foundation, with its windows broken and shingles ripped from the roof. Numerous trees were snapped.						
EF1	NE of Priceville	Hart	KY	37.39°N 85.9443°W	02:56–02:59	1.2 mi (1.9 km)	60 yd (55 m)
EF1	A large barn and several large hay bales were destroyed. Numerous trees were snapped along the path.						

=== Marshalltown, Iowa ===
Marshalltown, Iowa
- Radar loop of the EF3 tornado that struck Marshalltown, Iowa.

Meteorological history
- Formed: July 19, 2018, 4:24 p.m. CDT (UTC–05:00)
- Dissipated: July 19, 2018, 4:47 p.m. CDT (UTC–05:00)
- Duration: 23 minutes

EF3 tornado
- on the Enhanced Fujita scale
- Highest winds: 144 mph (232 km/h)

Overall effects
- Fatalities: 0
- Injuries: 22 (+1 indirect)
- Damage: $200 million (2018 USD)

This intense, large, multiple-vortex wedge tornado initially developed west of Marietta at 4:24 pm CDT. A tornado warning had been issued for this storm at 3:54 pm CDT and the storm had produced a brief EF0 tornado near Clemons before this one developed. Initially, the tornado was small and weak, producing only EF0 crop damage to farmland as it moved southeast and crossed 190th St. The tornado then turned due east, causing similar damage as it crossed Marsh Ave south of Marietta. The tornado then turned southeast again west of the Iowa River but began to grow in size as it paralleled the river northwest of Marshalltown. The tornado then reached EF1 intensity as it moved into forested areas east of Radio Tower Road. Extensive crop and tree damage occurred along this segment of the path. The tornado then began to rapidly strengthen and grow into a large wedge as it crossed Summit Street and turned due east into residential areas west of Marshalltown, producing widespread EF0-EF1 damage to numerous homes and trees. The tornado briefly reached EF2 intensity as it struck Tankersly Park before quickly reaching EF2 intensity again shortly thereafter. As the tornado entered the downtown area, a tornado emergency was issued for Marshalltown at 4:37 pm CDT. It was at this point that the tornado reached its peak intensity, producing EF3 damage to the RACOM building and the surrounding homes near and along West State Street.

It then moved through the city, producing widespread EF2 damage. Most of the Marshalltown Veteran's Memorial Coliseum, a historic city sports venue, collapsed and had its roof removed; the Marshall County Courthouse had the top portion of its clock tower ripped off along with severe roof damage, and many historic brick buildings had their roofs partially to completely removed, with some suffering blown-out upper-story walls. The tornado then narrowed as it jogged into the northeast side of the city but remained strong as it continued to inflict considerable damage to homes and businesses, with another small area of EF3 damage noted on Woodbury Street. Moving erratically eastward, the tornado then struck a Lennox International plant at EF2 strength. The plant suffered significant roof loss and collapse of multiple reinforced exterior walls, with many cars tossed and damaged in the parking lot. After crossing Linn Creek, the tornado produced one more area of EF3 damage along East Linn Street before rapidly weakening and dissipating shortly thereafter at 4:47 pm CDT.

The tornado was on the ground for 23 minutes, tracked 8.41 mi (13.53 km), and reached a peak width of 1,200 yd (1,100 m). There were 22 injuries, along with one indirect injury when a tree fell on a man during the clean-up of storm debris. Two years after this destructive tornado tore through Marshalltown, a 2020 Midwest derecho swept through the city, bringing straight line winds of 99 mph (159 km/h).

== Non-tornadic effects ==
As part of the storm system as a whole, a duck boat tour sank in Table Rock Lake, Missouri, at approximately 7 pm CDT. Of the 31 people on board, 17 of them died and 7 were injured. Nine of them were in a single family. Wind gusts were reportedly in excess of 60 miles per hour (97 km/h). A wind gust in Branson, Missouri reached 74 miles per hour (119 km/h).

== Impact and aftermath ==
Pella had 14,000 power outages while Bondurant, which got hit by an EF2 tornado, had 1,800 outages. Despite the damage and injuries, though, no one died due to tornadoes, which is likely credited to timely warnings once the tornadoes actually did touch down. Following these tornadoes, several counties in Iowa were declared disaster zones by Kim Reynolds. Marsalltown would suffer even more destruction just over two years later when a powerful derecho produced widespread destruction across the city. Several buildings in downtown Marshalltown were condemned and demolished in the following years as a result of both storms.

== See also ==
- List of North American tornadoes and tornado outbreaks
- Iowa tornado outbreak of November 2005 – A small but strong tornado outbreak centered in Iowa
- Tornado outbreak of April 9–11, 2011 – Featured an EF4 tornado in Iowa
