= Ride the Ducks =

Former duck tour operator

Coordinates: 33°58′23″N 84°13′27″W

- Ride the Ducks logo
- Type: Subsidiary
- Industry: Tourism
- Founded: Branson, Missouri, 1977 (49 years ago)
- Founder: Robert McDowell
- Fate: Permanently shut down (except for Guam)
- Headquarters: Atlanta, Georgia, United States
- Services: Duck tours
- Parent: Ripley Entertainment; Baldgya Group (Guam Operations)

Ride the Ducks was a national duck tour operator and eponymous tourist attraction in some parts of the United States and Guam. It made use of amphibious vehicles, nicknamed "ducks", to provide tours of cities by boat and by land.

Ride the Ducks was purchased by Herschend Family Entertainment Corporation in 2004. Herschend sold a majority interest in the company to an independent investor in 2012. The Branson operation was sold to Ripley Entertainment in December 2017. In 2019, Ripley announced that Ride The Ducks in Branson would be permanently shut down and replaced by another attraction due to the July 2018 accident on Table Rock Lake where 17 people drowned. In 2025, a new attraction unrelated to Ride the Ducks or Ripley called "Branson Duck Tours" began operation. According to their website, they use modern floating amphibious vehicles for their tours, which are much safer due to their buoyancy, stability, and larger passenger escapes.

== Operations ==
The company used custom-built amphibious vehicles based on the DUKW amphibious vehicle design from World War II known as "truck ducks", while some used an original DUKW chassis extended to fit them, known as "stretch ducks". All incorporated advances in marine design and safety. Drivers were certified by the Coast Guard and held commercial drivers' licenses, and all vehicles were equipped with personal flotation devices. The company had also manufactured vehicles for other duck tour operators.

=== Locations ===
Ride the Ducks also formerly operated in a number of additional locations across the United States and one location in Guam:

- Branson, Missouri (Opened: 1970, Closed: 2018)
- Boston, Massachusetts (Under the name "Boston Duck Tours") (Opened: 1994)
- Seattle, Washington (Under the name "Ride the Ducks of Seattle") (Opened: 1997, Closed: 2020)
- Baltimore, Maryland (Opened: 2002, Closed: 2009)
- Philadelphia, Pennsylvania (Opened: 2003, Closed: 2016)
- Stone Mountain, Georgia (Opened: 2003, Closed: 2018)
- Memphis, Tennessee (Opened: 2005, Closed: 2007)
- San Francisco, California (Opened: 2008, Closed: 2015)
- Newport, Kentucky (Opened: 2008, Closed: 2018)
- Tamuning, Guam (Opened: 2014)
- Mobile, Alabama (Under the name "Gulf Coast Ducks") (Opened: 2016, Closed: 2019)

== Incidents ==
The duck boats operated by Ride the Ducks were involved in a number of incidents.

=== July 2010 accident ===
In July 2010, a Ride the Ducks vehicle stalled on the Delaware River in Philadelphia, Pennsylvania, and was struck by a barge being pushed by a tugboat, sinking the duck boat and killing two of the passengers, who were Hungarian tourists. The National Transportation Safety Board determined that the probable cause of the accident was the tugboat operator's inattention to his duties. The tugboat operator served a one-year sentence for “the maritime equivalent of involuntary manslaughter.” Six years after the accident, Ride The Ducks ceased operations in Philadelphia.

=== Sept 2015 accident ===
On September 24, 2015, a Ride the Ducks vehicle operated by an independent firm Ride the Ducks of Seattle broke an axle, crossed the center lane and crashed into a charter bus, killing four people on Seattle's Aurora Bridge. A fifth person died days later at a hospital from injuries sustained in the collision. The vehicle had been purchased from the Missouri-based manufacturer, and had not undergone a recommended repair to the front axle. The Missouri firm paid a fine of $1 million. In 2019, a jury in King County found Ride the Ducks International liable for 67% of a $123 million judgment stemming from the accident on the Aurora Bridge.

=== July 2018 accident ===
On July 19, 2018, a Ride the Ducks vehicle capsized and sank while in Table Rock Lake near Branson, Missouri, during high winds from nearby thunderstorms. 31 individuals were on board, and 17 fatalities were confirmed. The day following the accident, Ride the Ducks announced that the Branson operation would be "closed for business" pending an investigation and out of respect for the victims' families. The boat involved was an original from World War II having been built in 1944. In March 2019, Ride The Ducks announced they would be permanently shut down due to the investigation and overwhelming legal issues after the incident. A replacement attraction, Top Ops, opened in June 2019 at the same location.
