= Vermeer Corporation =

Industrial and agricultural equipment manufacturer in the United States and beyond

Vermeer

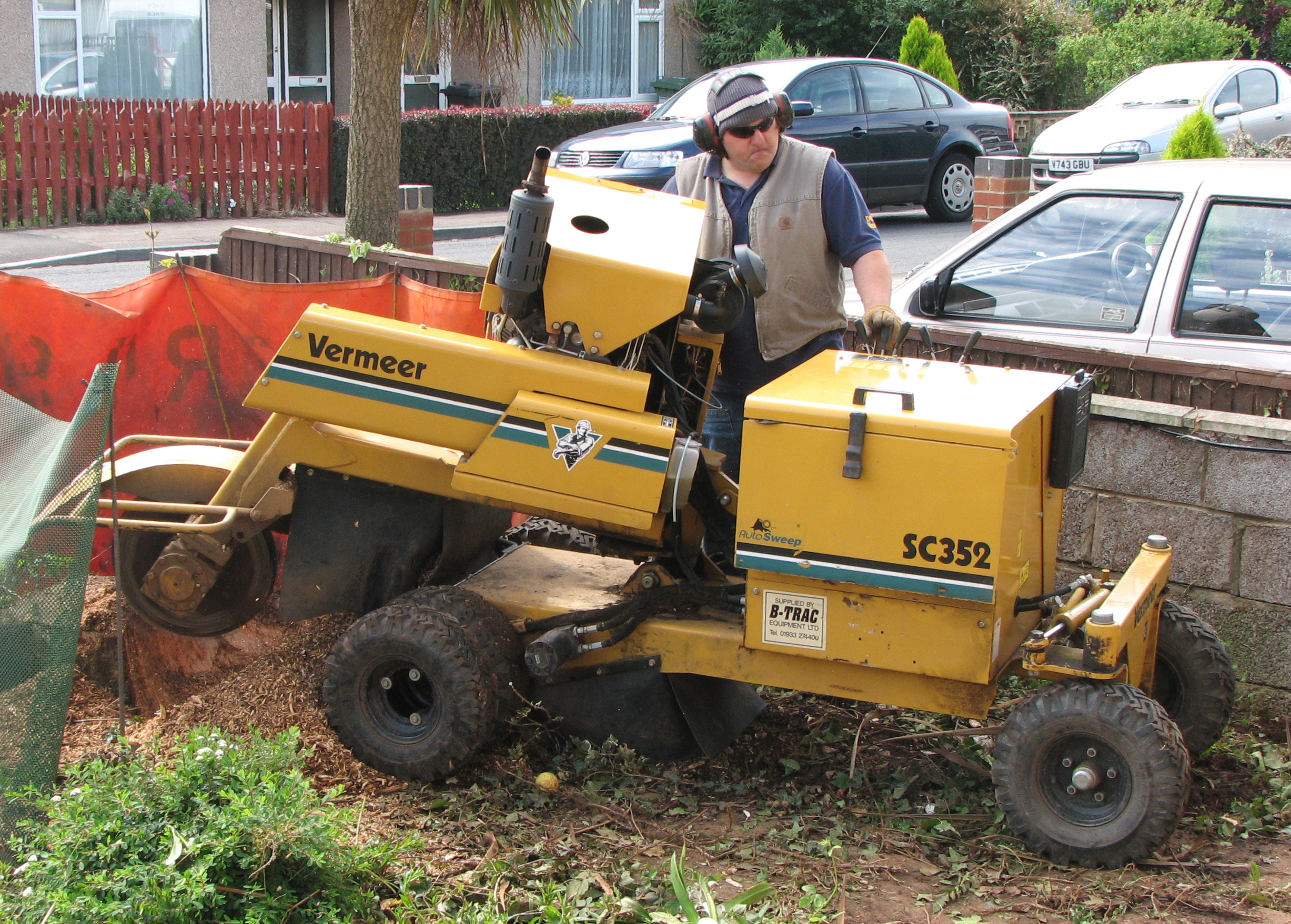
- A Vermeer stump cutter in England
- Formerly: Vermeer Manufacturing Company
- Founded: 1948
- Founder: Gary Vermeer
- Headquarters: Pella, Iowa
- Number of employees: 3,400
- Website: vermeer.com

Vermeer Corporation is a manufacturer of industrial and agricultural equipment.

== Operation ==
The privately held company distributes products globally from seven production facilities and offices in Pella, Iowa, United States and multiple locations worldwide. Founded in 1948 by Gary Vermeer, as Vermeer Manufacturing Company, the company is in its third generation of family management under President and CEO Jason Andringa as well as other members of the third generation.

== Working field ==
Vermeer serves the construction, landscaping, environmental, excavation, and forage markets domestically and internationally from locations in the Netherlands, Germany, mainland China, Singapore, Hong Kong (China), Canada, and Brazil, as well as various wholly and partially owned subsidiaries in the United States. Its products are sold and supported by independent dealers in over 60 countries.

== History ==
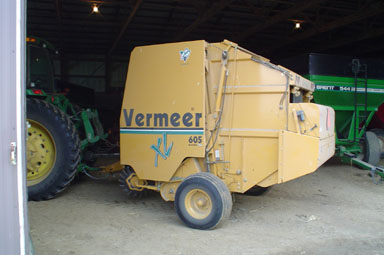
A Vermeer round baler

In central Iowa in 1943, Gary Vermeer created a mechanical hoist to ease the process of unloading his grain wagon during harvest. Farm neighbors observed his wagon hoist in operation and asked for ones of their own. At his request, a local machine shop fabricated a number of these hoists to meet the demand. Today, Vermeer holds several product and design patents within its line of utility and track trenchers, directional boring systems, tub grinders, tree equipment, excavation machines, and hay-harvesting products. The company markets 100 agricultural and industrial products worldwide, and operates 1,500,000 square feet (140,000 m^{2}) of plant space for manufacturing. On July 19, 2018, the Vermeer campus was hit by a tornado causing significant damage to two plant buildings and minor damage to other buildings.

== Milestones ==
- Portable Pow-R Drive, a self-propelled irrigation system, hay conditioner and cutter are introduced in the 1950s.
- Vermeer invents the first machine to dig, transport and replace large trees in the 1960s.
- The first larger round hay baler was invented by Gary Vermeer in 1971. Allis Chalmers first introduced the small round rotobaler in 1947.
- Vermeer begins building large trenchers to lay underground pipelines in the 1980s.
- The first Vermeer horizontal directional drill is introduced in the 1990s.
- The prototype of the first self-propelled hay baler is demonstrated in 2017.
