= Aurora Bridge =

Highway bridge in Seattle, US

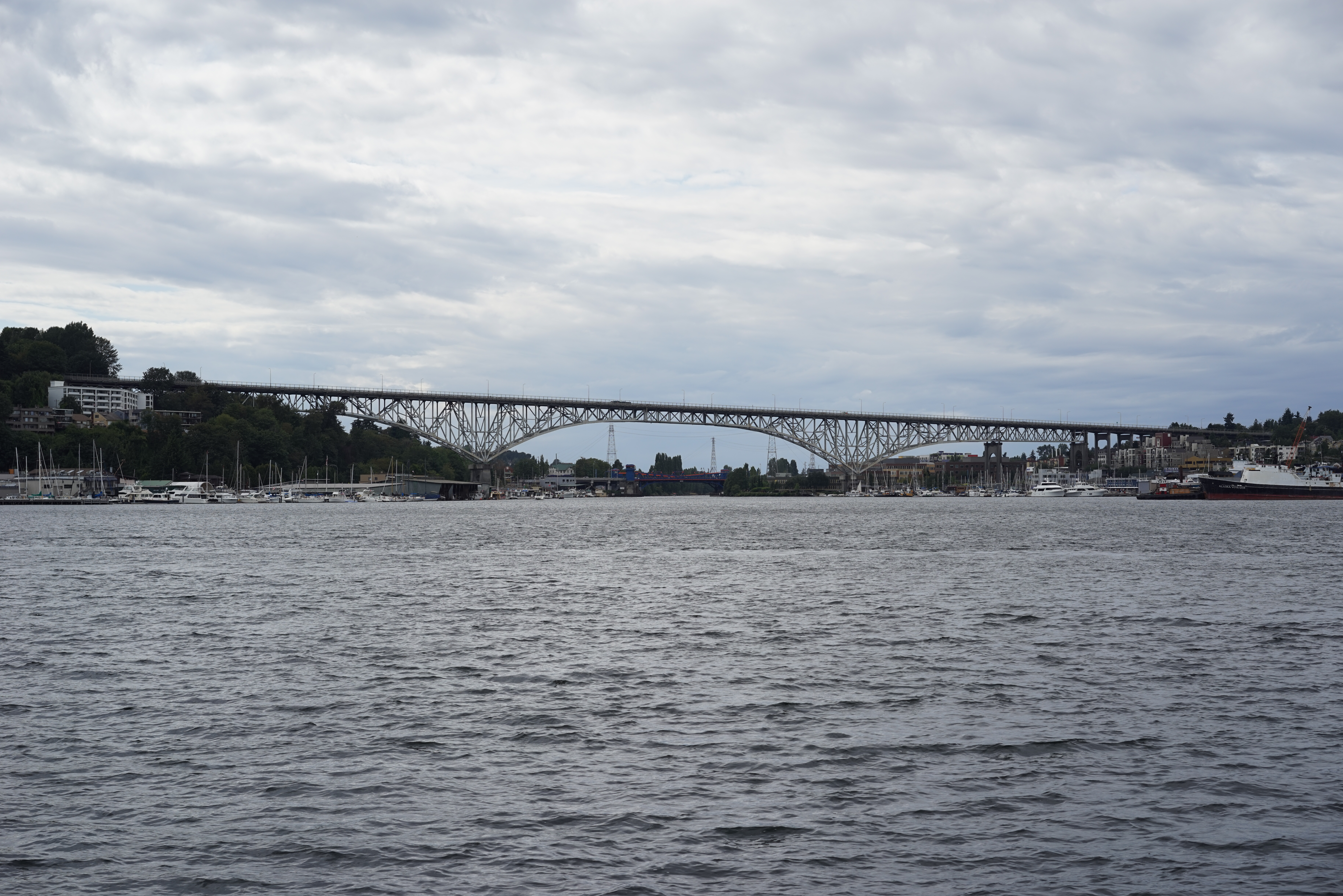
- The main span of the bridge in 2015, looking west. The suspended truss is visible at the center of the cantilever arch structures.
- Coordinates: 47°38′47″N 122°20′50″W
- Carries: SR 99 (Aurora Avenue North)
- Crosses: Lake Union
- Locale: Seattle, Washington, U.S.
- Official name: George Washington Memorial Bridge
- Maintained by: Washington State DOT
- ID number: 0001447A0000000

Characteristics
- Design: Mixed, cantilever and truss
- Total length: 2,945 ft (898 m)
- Width: 70 ft (21 m)
- Longest span: 475 ft (145 m)
- Clearance below: 167 ft (51 m)

History
- Opened: February 22, 1932; 94 years ago

Statistics
- Daily traffic: 61,998 (2017)
- Aurora Avenue Bridge
- U.S. National Register of Historic Places
- Location: Aurora Avenue North over Lake Washington Ship Canal, Seattle, Washington
- Coordinates: 47°38′47″N 122°20′51″W
- Built: 1931–32
- Built by: U.S. Steel Products Corp.
- Architects: Jacobs & Ober
- MPS: Historic Bridges/Tunnels in Washington State TR
- NRHP reference No.: 82004230
- Added to NRHP: July 16, 1982

The Aurora Bridge (officially called the George Washington Memorial Bridge) is a cantilever and truss bridge in Seattle, Washington, United States. It carries State Route 99 (Aurora Avenue North) over the west end of Seattle's Lake Union and connects Queen Anne and Fremont. The bridge is located just east of the Fremont Cut, which itself is spanned by the Fremont Bridge.

The Aurora Bridge is owned and operated by the Washington State Department of Transportation. It is 2,945 ft (898 m) long, 70 ft (21 m) wide, and 167 ft (51 m) above the water. The bridge was opened to traffic on February 22, 1932, the 200th anniversary of the birth of its namesake, George Washington, a Founding Father and first president of the United States. It was listed on the National Register of Historic Places in 1982.

The bridge has been the site of numerous fatal incidents over the years. It is a popular location for suicide jumpers and several reports have used the bridge as a case study in fields ranging from suicide prevention to the effects of pre-hospital care on trauma victims. In 1998, a bus driver was shot and killed while driving over the bridge, causing his bus to crash and resulting in the death of one of the passengers. In 2015, five people died and fifty were injured when an amphibious duck tour vehicle crashed into a charter bus on the bridge in an incident that also involved two smaller vehicles.

== Design ==
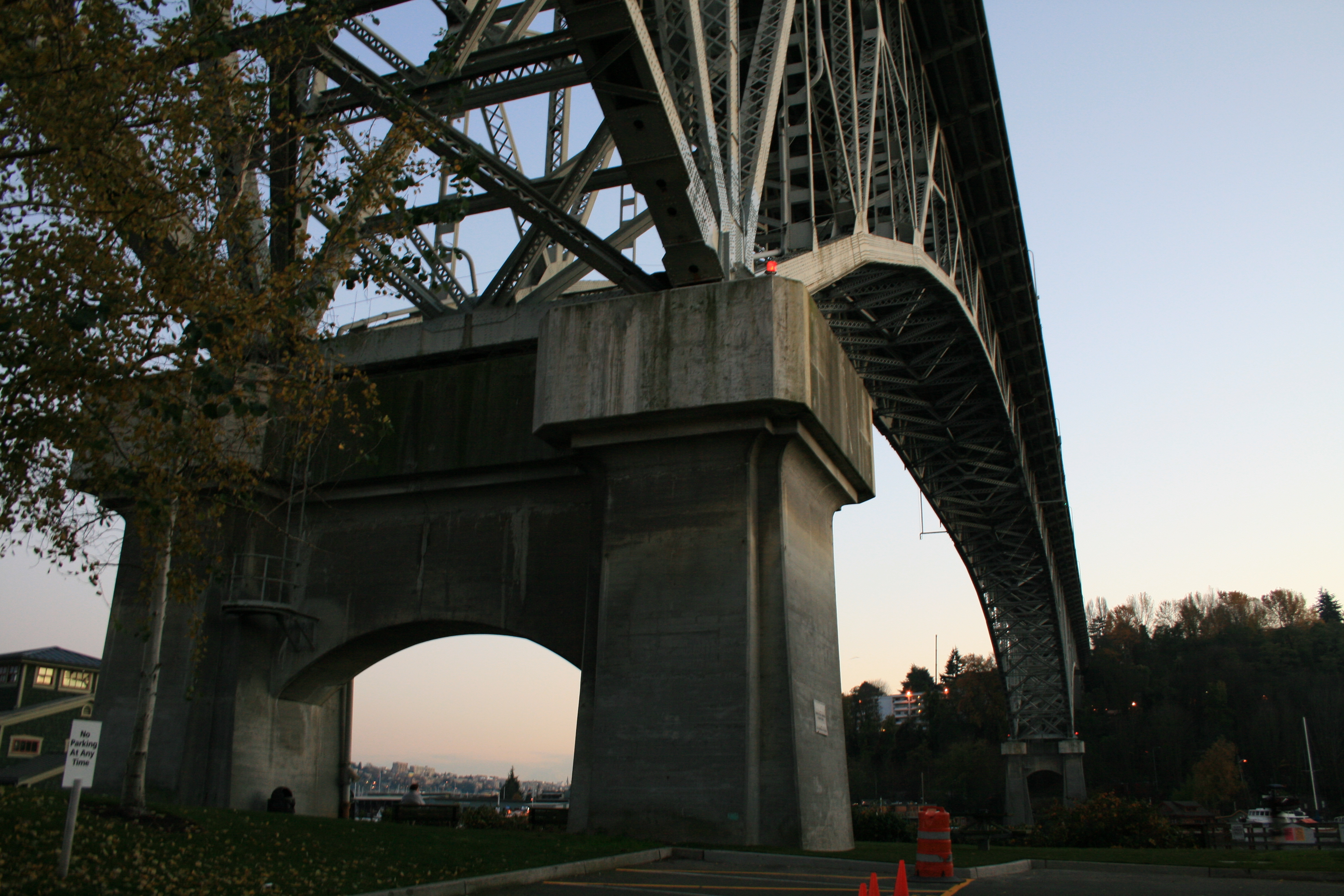
The northern anchor of the bridge

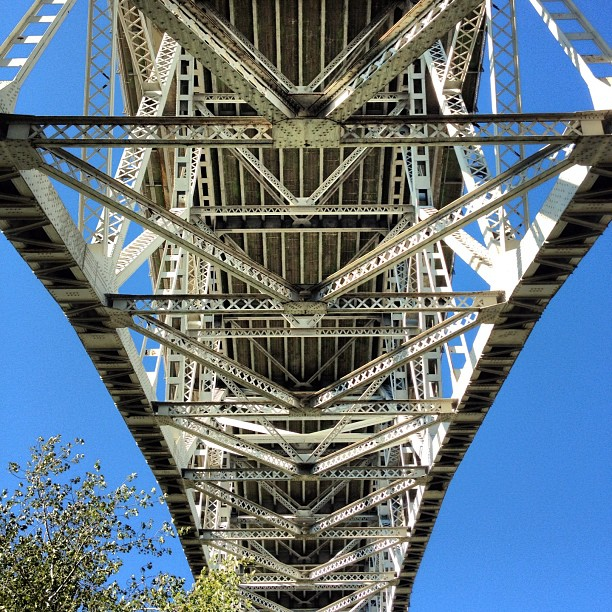
View from beneath the bridge

The bridge is 2,945 ft (898 m) long, 70 ft (21 m) wide, 167 ft (51 m) above the water and is owned and operated by the Washington State Department of Transportation (WSDOT). There are two V-shaped cantilever sections supporting the bridge deck, each 325 ft (99 m) long and balanced on large concrete pilings at opposite sides of the ship canal which serve as the two main supporting anchors. Some 828 timber piles were driven for the foundation of the south anchor and 684 piles for the north. They range in size from 110 to 120 feet (34 to 37 m) and rest 50 to 55 feet (15 to 17 m) below the surface of the water. Together, the anchors support a load of 8,000 tons. Their construction required a pile driver that was specially designed to work underwater.

A 150 ft (46 m) long Warren truss suspended span connects the two cantilevers in the middle. The bridge's main span is 475 ft (145 m) long. At either end of the bridge there are additional Warren truss spans which connect the cantilevered spans to the highway.

== History ==
Construction on the bridge piers began in 1929, with construction of the bridge following shortly afterwards in 1931. The bridge's dedication was held on February 22, 1932, George Washington's 200th birthday; it opened to traffic the same day. A time capsule was installed on the bridge by the widow of Judge Thomas Burke and is planned to be opened in 2032.

The bridge was the final link in what was then called the Pacific Highway (later known as U.S. Route 99), which ran from Canada to Mexico. The bridge crosses the Lake Union section of the Lake Washington Ship Canal and, unlike earlier bridges across the canal, the height of the Aurora Bridge eliminated the need for a drawbridge. In 1930 Seattle City Council voted to build connecting portions of the highway through the Woodland Park Zoo, a decision which generated considerable controversy at the time.

The bridge was designed by the Seattle architectural firm Jacobs & Ober, with Ralph Ober as the lead engineer on the project. Ober died in August 1931, of a brain hemorrhage while it was still under construction. Federal funding programs were not available at the time, so the bridge was funded by Seattle, King County, and the state of Washington.

The bridge was nominated for the National Register of Historic Places on January 2, 1980, on account of its "functional and aesthetic" design qualities and its historical status as the first bridge constructed in the region without streetcar tracks. It was accepted to the National Register on July 16, 1982. The bridge formerly had a set of pedestrian refuge islands in the highway's median that were removed in 1944.

In 1990 the Fremont Troll—a large concrete sculpture of a troll clutching a real-life Volkswagen Beetle—was installed under the bridge's north end. Up to half of the $40,000 cost for the artwork was donated from Seattle's Neighborhood Matching Fund, a local program to raise money for community projects. The Troll was heavily vandalized in the year following its construction, and large floodlights were installed on the bridge to discourage further damage.

Following the collapse of the Minneapolis I-35W arch-truss bridge on August 1, 2007, WSDOT was directed to perform inspections of all steel cantilever bridges in the state that used gusset plates in their design, including the George Washington Memorial Bridge. The bridge had earlier been certified as structurally sound with no serious deficiencies detected. That year, the Federal Highway Administration National Bridge Inventory found the bridge to be "functionally obsolete". The bridge was given a sufficiency rating of 55.2% and evaluated to be "better than minimum adequacy to tolerate being left in place as is". Its foundations and railings met the acceptable standards and no immediate corrective action was needed to improve it.

The George Washington Memorial Bridge underwent extensive seismic retrofitting in 2011 and 2012 at a cost of $5.7 million. During a regular inspection in October 2019, WSDOT structural engineers determined that an outside stringer beam on the southbound side of the bridge had corroded to the point of creating a visible sag in the roadway. Southbound traffic was reduced to two lanes for an emergency repair that cost $500,000 and took seven days (out of a scheduled ten days).

=== Accidents and incidents ===
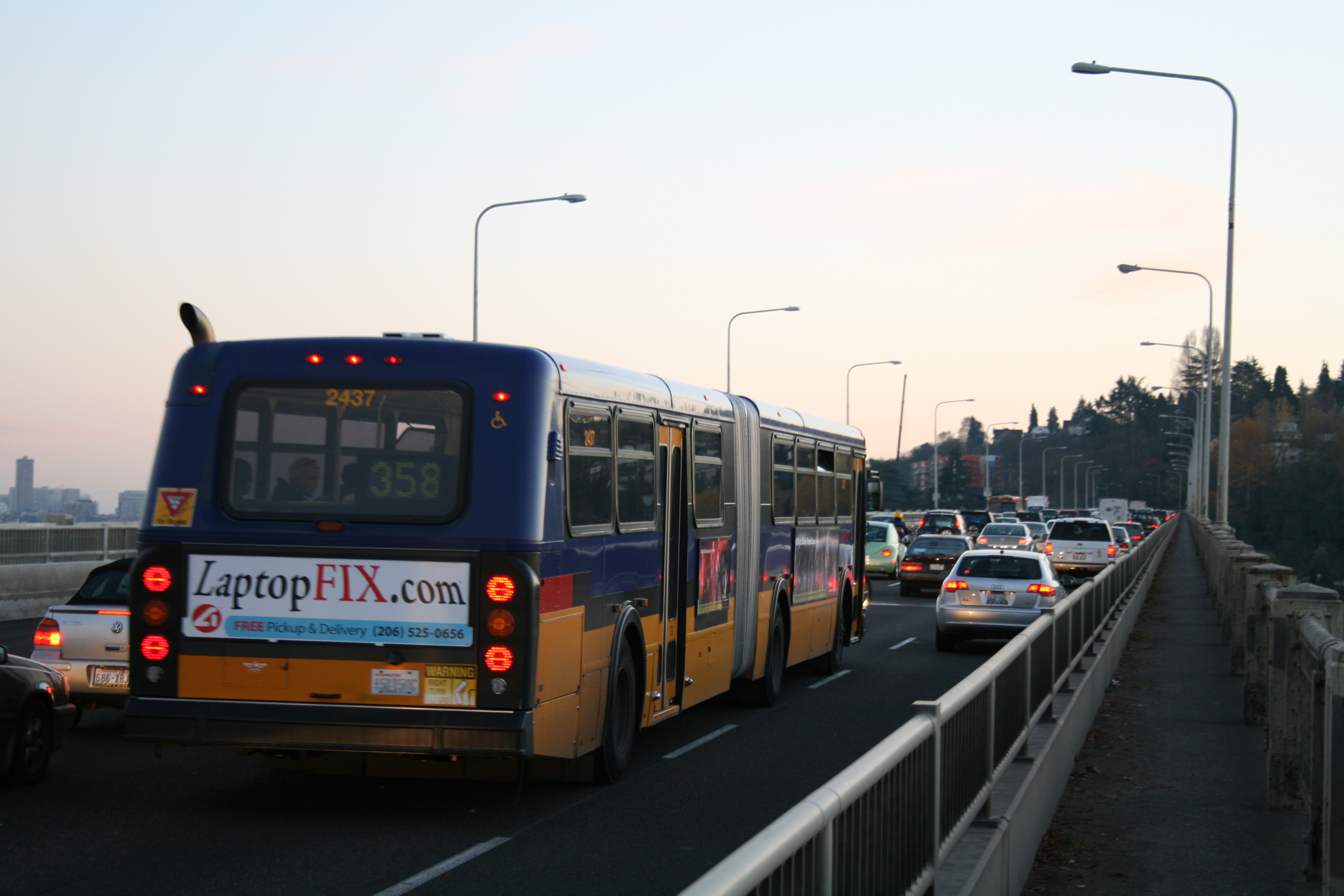
A southbound Route 358 articulated bus crossing the bridge in 2007

On November 27, 1998, King County Metro driver Mark McLaughlin, the driver of a southbound route 359 Express articulated bus, was shot and killed by a passenger, Silas Cool, while driving across the bridge. Cool then shot himself as the bus veered across two lanes of traffic and plunged off the bridge's eastern side onto the roof of an apartment building below. Herman Liebelt, a passenger on the bus, later died of injuries he sustained in the crash. According to estimates from WSDOT, repairs to the bridge cost over $18,000. Medical claims from the victims against King County amounted to $2.3 million.

A service for McLaughlin was held on December 8, 1998, at KeyArena in Seattle. Numerous state and county officials and over 100 transit drivers attended the service, which included a procession of over eighty Metro buses and vans. Metro retired the number 359 as a route designation and replaced it with route 358 in February 1999, as part of a restructure of service on Aurora Avenue. On February 15, 2014, Route 358 itself was retired, and replaced with the RapidRide E Line.

On September 24, 2015, five people were killed and fifty were injured when an amphibious "duck tour" vehicle crashed into a charter bus on the bridge in a collision that also involved two smaller vehicles. According to a representative from the Chinese consulate, all of the students were foreign-born. The students all attended North Seattle College, and were on their way to Safeco Field for new student orientation. One witness reported that it appeared as though the duck boat veered into the oncoming bus, after crossing the center line. Some blame for the collision was placed on the narrowness of the 57-foot-wide (17 m) bridge deck, which has 9.5-foot-wide (2.9 m) lanes, and the lack of a median barrier to separate the two directions of traffic. There have also been some calls to reduce the number of lanes from six narrow lanes to four wider lanes, although early reports indicated that a mechanical failure of the duck tour vehicles' front axle may have also been a major factor in the crash.

== Suicides ==
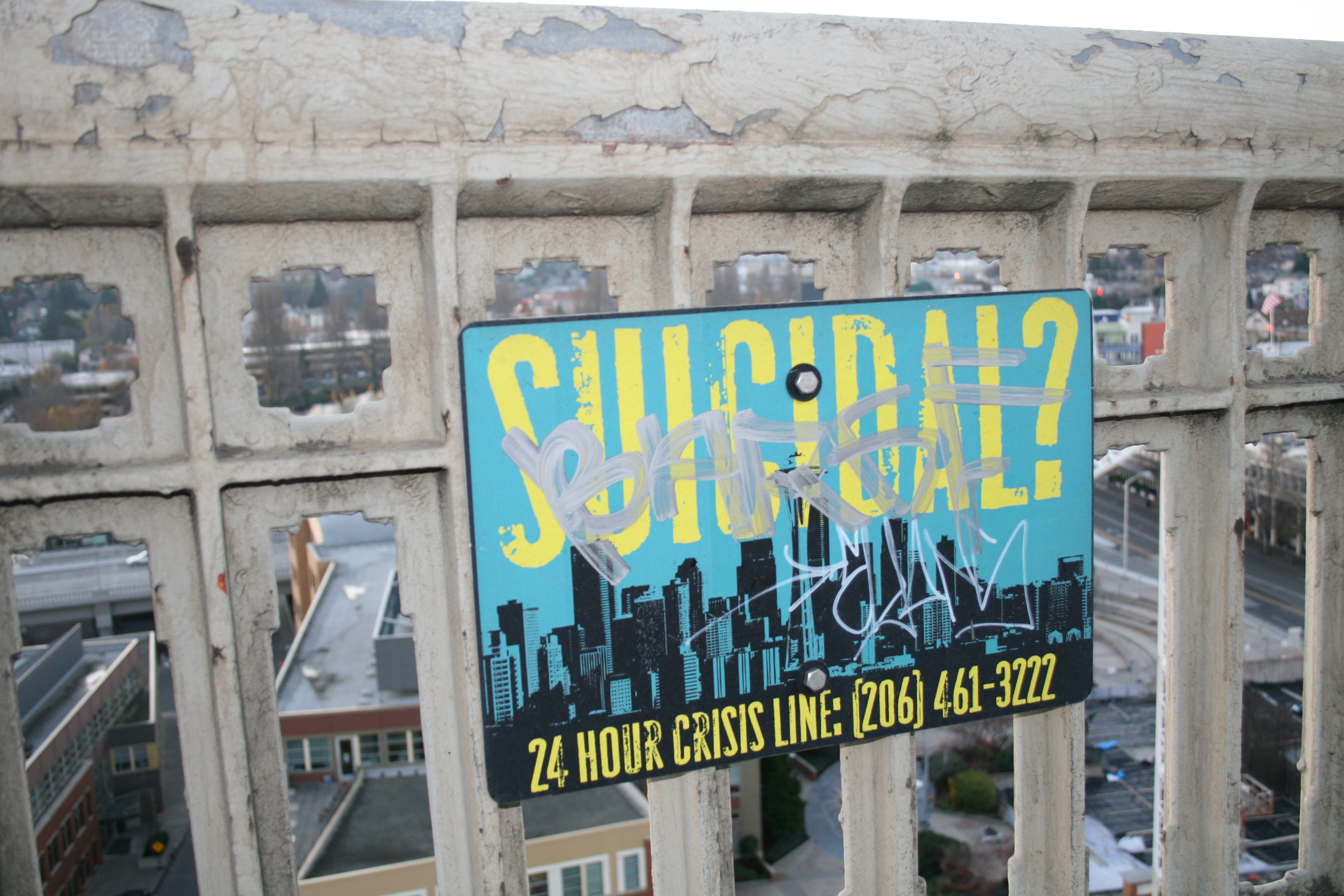
Sign for the suicide hotline on the George Washington Memorial Bridge

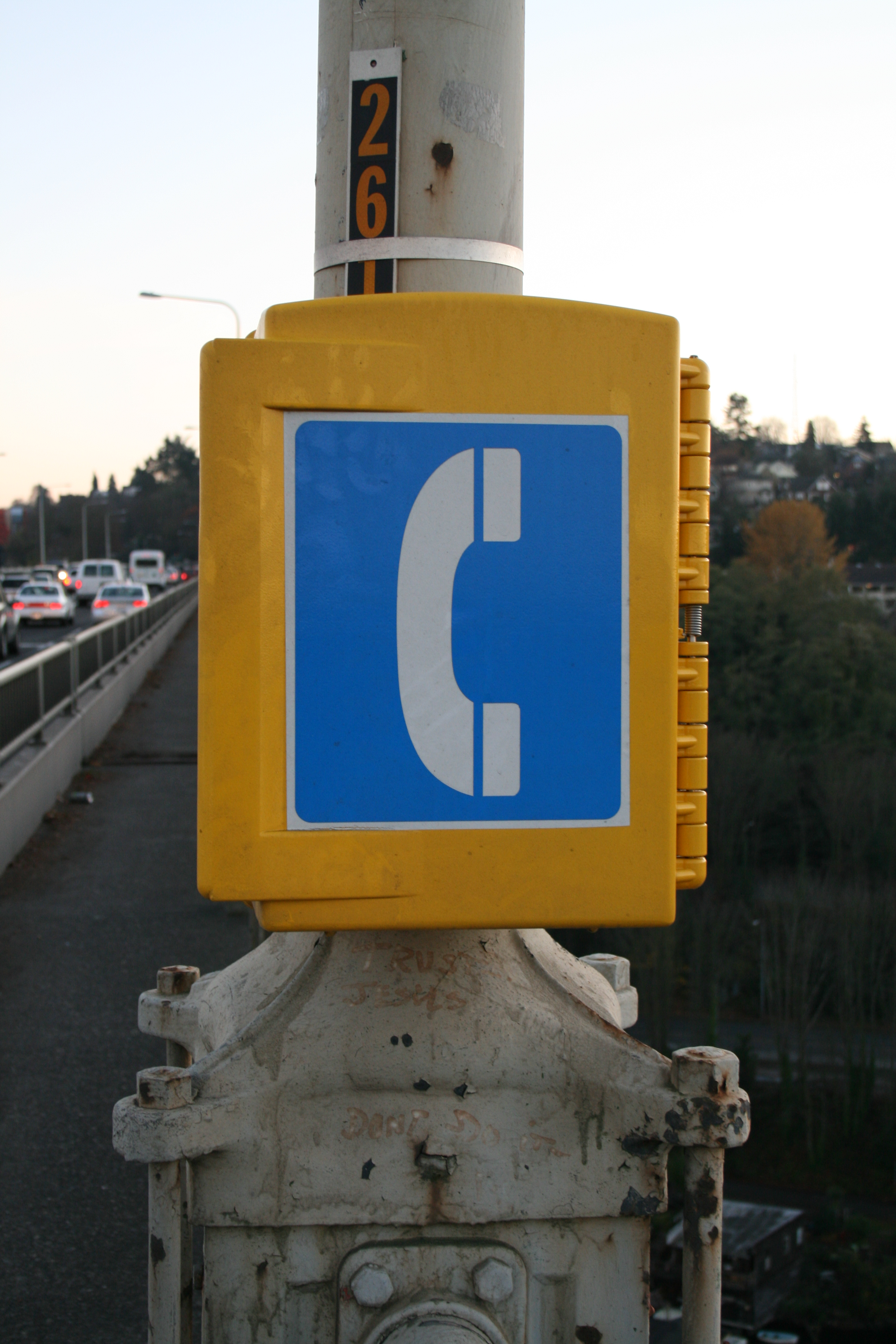
One of six emergency phones on the bridge

The bridge's height and pedestrian access make it a popular location for suicide jumpers. Since construction, there have been over 230 suicides from the bridge, with nearly 50 deaths occurring in the decade 1995–2005. The first suicide occurred on January 20, 1932, when a shoe salesman leapt from the bridge before it was completed. A notable suicide was that of Cheryl Glass, one the first female African-American racing drivers in the United States.

Numerous reports have been written about the high incidence of suicide on the bridge, many of them using the bridge as a case study in fields ranging from suicide prevention to the effects of prehospital care on trauma victims. Despite the force of impact, jumpers occasionally survive the fall from the bridge, though not without sustaining serious injuries.

News sources have referred to the George Washington Memorial Bridge as a suicide bridge. In December 2006, six emergency phones and 18 signs were installed on the bridge to encourage people to seek help instead of jumping. Around that time, a group of community activists and political leaders living near the bridge created the Fremont Individuals and Employees Nonprofit to Decrease Suicides (FRIENDS), their primary focus being the installation of a suicide barrier on the bridge.

In 2007, Washington Governor Christine Gregoire allocated $1.4 million in her supplemental budget for the construction of an 8-foot-high (2.4 m) suicide-prevention fence to help reduce the number of suicides on the bridge. Construction of the fence began in spring 2010 and was completed in February 2011, at a total cost of $4.8 million.

== See also ==
- List of bridges documented by the Historic American Engineering Record in Washington (state)
- List of bridges in Seattle
- List of bridges on the National Register of Historic Places in Washington (state)
