= Otley, Iowa =

- Unincorporated community
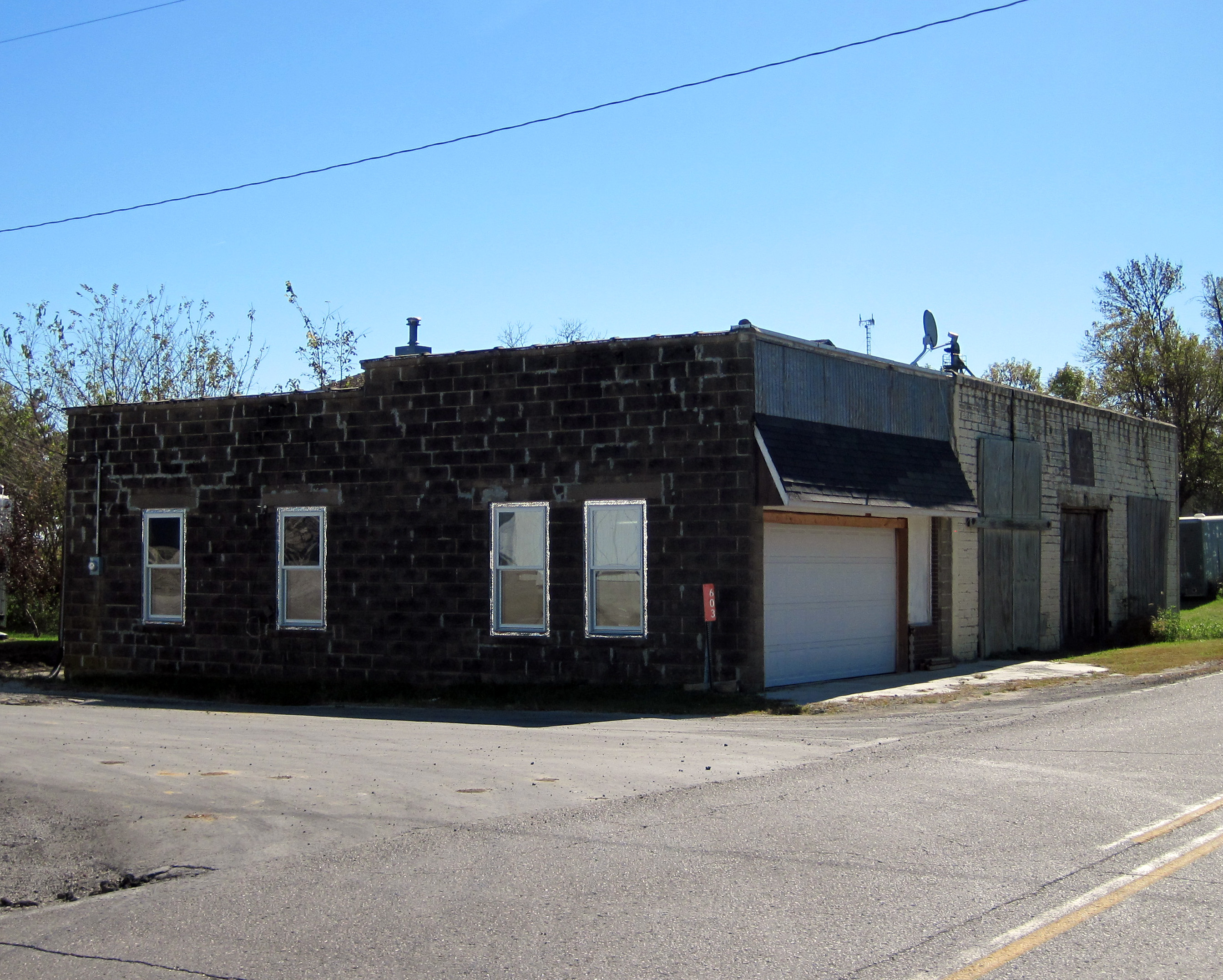
- Downtown Otley

- Location within Iowa Location within the United States
- Coordinates: 41°27′32″N 93°02′09″W
- Country: United States
- State: Iowa
- County: Marion
- Elevation: 879 ft (268 m)
- Time zone: UTC-6 (Central (CST))
  - Summer (DST): UTC-5 (CDT)
- ZIP codes: 50214
- GNIS feature ID: 463550

Otley is a small unincorporated community in Marion County, Iowa, United States. Governed by state laws and county ordinances. It is located approximately 45 miles southeast of the capital, Des Moines, on Iowa Highway 163. The US Post Office has a ZIP Code of 50214. Otley has one post office and is home to Vyke Industries, Mills Mid-Iowa Machinery, LLC, Otley Reformed Church, and Two Rivers Co-op. Additionally, home of several people who went on to form O.P.S. Social Club.

== History ==
The population was 150 in 1940.
