= Table Rock State Park (Missouri) =

State park in southwest Missouri, US

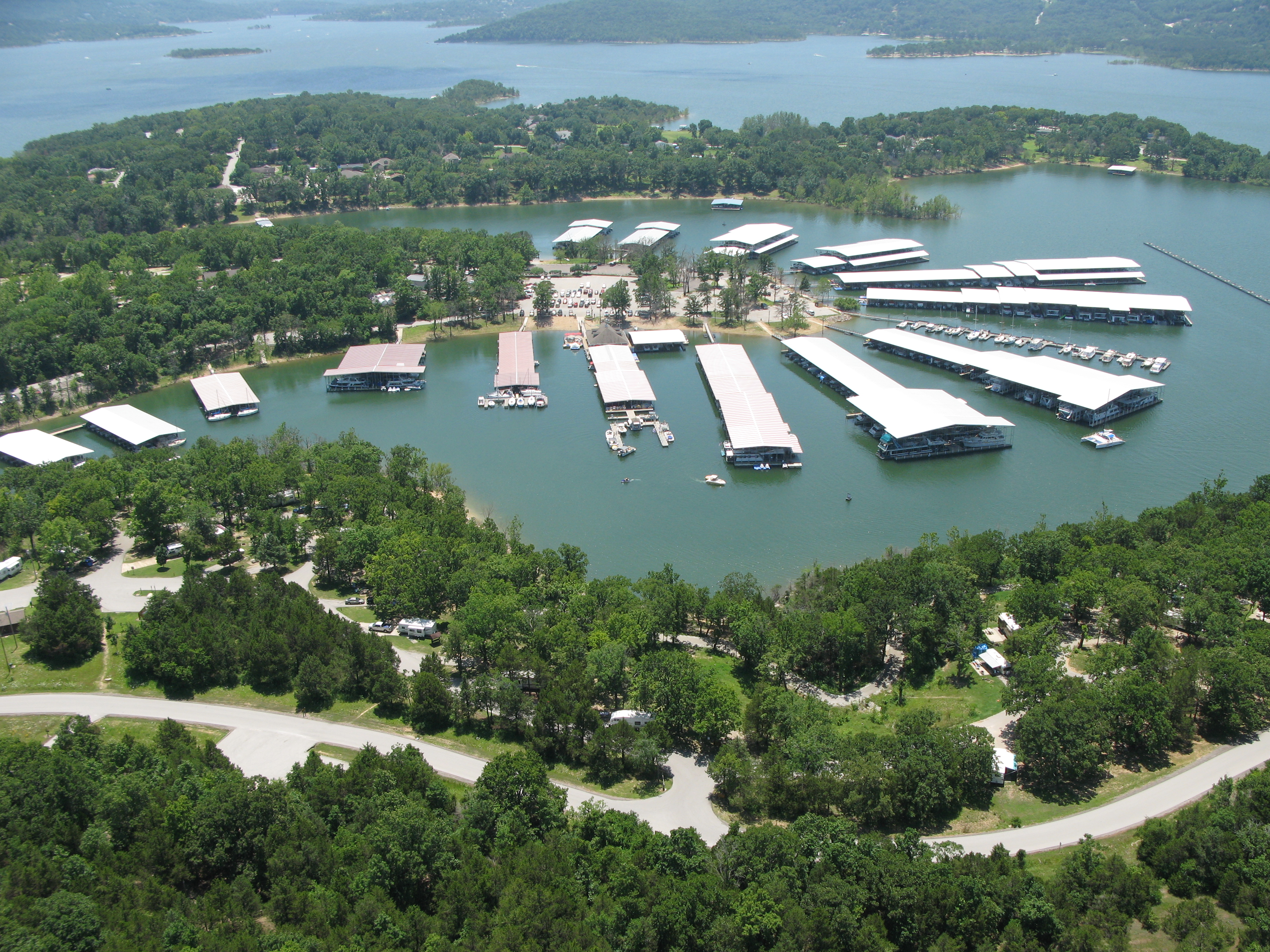
- Table Rock State Park Marina

- Location within Missouri Location within the United States
- Location: Taney and Stone counties, Missouri, United States
- Coordinates: 36°34′58″N 93°18′27″W
- Area: 356.03 acres (144.08 ha)
- Elevation: 889 ft (271 m)
- Established: 1959
- Administrator: Missouri Department of Natural Resources
- Visitors: 1,163,479 (in 2023)
- Website: Official website

Table Rock State Park is a public recreation area in the U.S. state of Missouri consisting of 356 acres (144 ha) located in Taney County and Stone County on Table Rock Lake along the southern side of the city of Branson. The state park's facilities include a marina, campgrounds, and trails for hiking and bicycling.
