= Table Rock Lake duck boat accident =

Duck boat accident

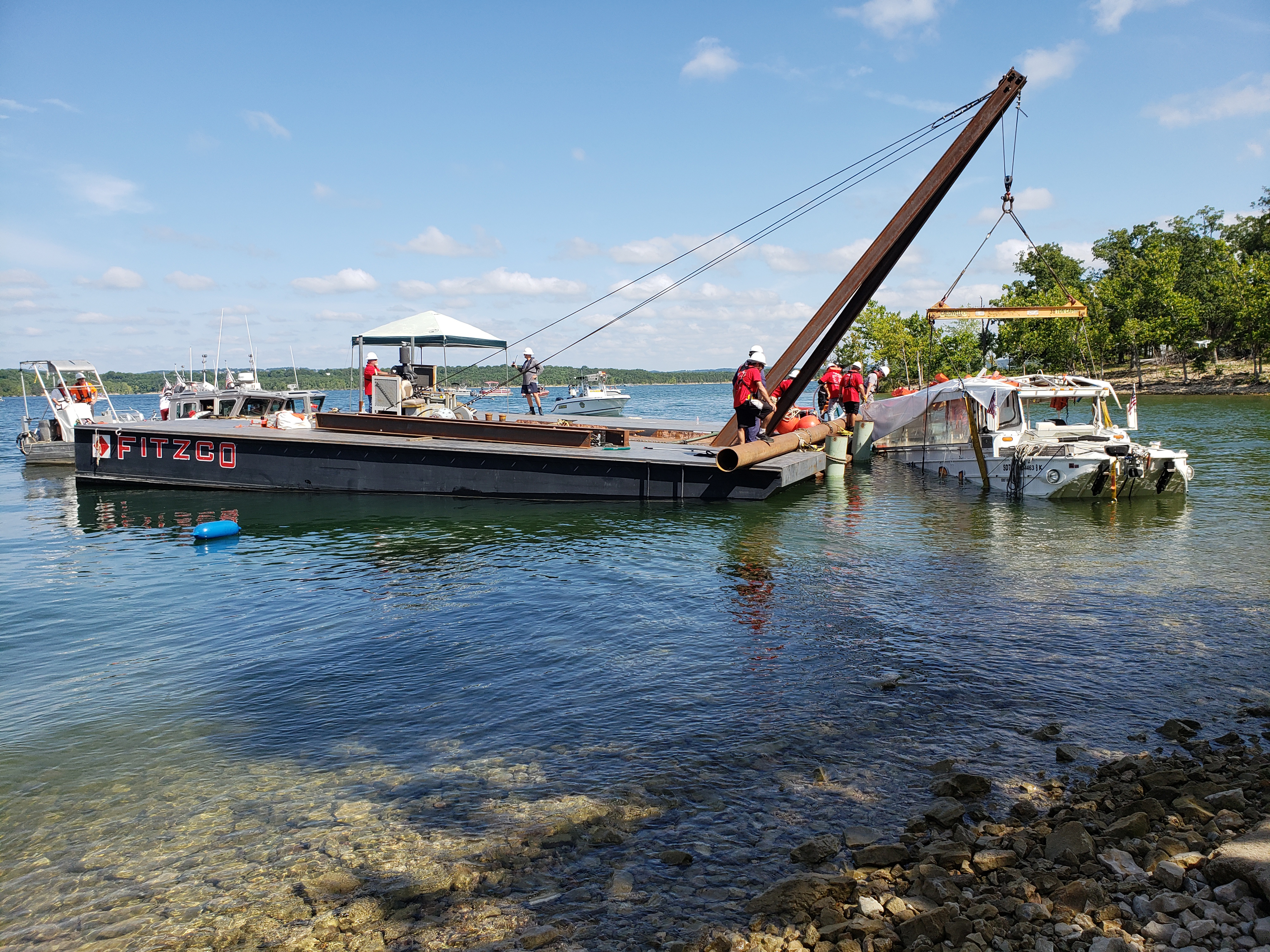
- The boat involved in the accident is retrieved from the bottom of Table Rock Lake
- Date: July 19, 2018; 8 years ago
- Time: Around 7:09 p.m. (CDT)
- Location: Table Rock Lake, Missouri, U.S.; 36°35′16″N 93°19′06″W
- Cause: Derecho event
- Participants: 31
- Deaths: 17
- Injuries: 7

On the evening of July 19, 2018, a duck boat operated by Ride the Ducks sank on Table Rock Lake in the Ozarks near Branson, Missouri, in the United States. The amphibious vehicle sank with 31 people on board, leaving 17 dead, during high winds associated with nearby severe thunderstorms as part of a significant derecho and tornado outbreak.

== Background ==
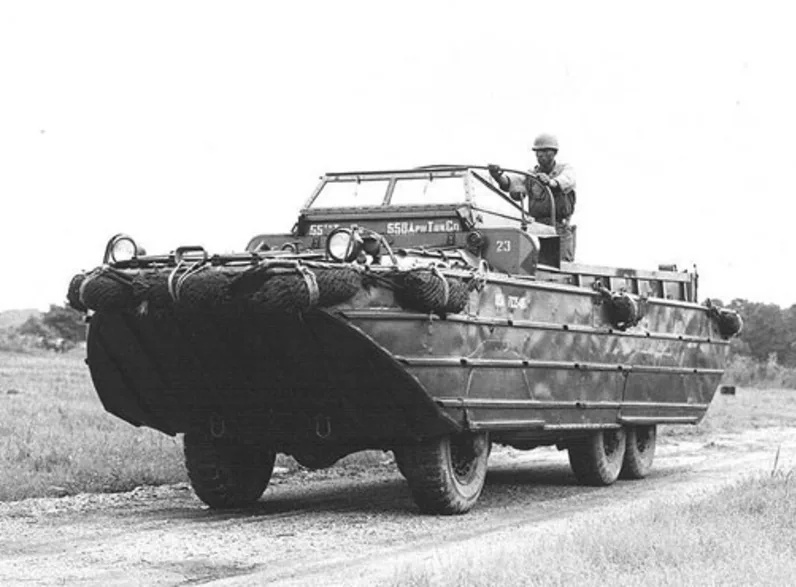
The original design of the DUKW did not include a hard overhead canopy.

The DUKW ("Duck" or "duck boat") is a wheeled amphibious vehicle used by the United States military and its allies during the later years of World War II and the Korean War. The vehicles became available in surplus after the Korean War, and a veteran in Minnesota began a business giving rides aboard the vessels to tourists on the Wisconsin River. Over the last 50 years, the practice has expanded to other areas. Several major tourist destinations in the United States feature duck boat tours, including Austin, Boston, Pittsburgh, Philadelphia, and Washington, D.C.

Before the Table Rock Lake accident, Thomas P. Grazulis recorded that an F2 tornado struck the lake on March 12, 1961, injuring two that had been on a boat, while also destroying lakeside infrastructure. There had been several other fatal incidents involving duck boats, notably one near Hot Springs, Arkansas, on May 1, 1999, in which 13 people died. That incident was attributed to several factors, according to the National Transportation Safety Board (NTSB); inadequate maintenance was the main cause, with other contributing factors including inadequate reserve buoyancy and the continuous canopy roof over the passenger cabin preventing escape. Among others, recommendations were made for amphibious passenger vehicles to either add additional buoyancy to prevent sinking when flooded, or require passengers to wear life jackets and remove the canopy to allow escape in the event of a sinking.

== Accident ==
The accident occurred shortly after 7 p.m. Central Daylight Time on July 19, 2018, as a line of severe thunderstorms approached the Branson area. The vessel was carrying 29 passengers and 2 crew.

Approximately an hour before the accident, the National Weather Service had issued a severe thunderstorm warning for areas around the lake. It is unknown whether the two crew members aboard the vessel were aware of the warning or what action they attempted to take. The National Weather Service reports that winds in the area at the time were over 60 mph (97 km/h), and the storm over the lake was moving very quickly and causing three-foot (one-meter) waves on the lake. In the after incident report issued by the National Weather Service, they reported the severe thunderstorms were part of a significant derecho event, which had also spawned several tornadoes.

The vessel was a refurbished DUKW built in 1944 and extended to hold more people, a design known as a "stretch duck". The first 911 call was received at 7:09 p.m. CDT as the boat was already going under the water, according to the local sheriff. Local officials reported the following morning that all passengers and crew aboard the vessel had been accounted for and confirmed a total of 17 deaths. The ages of those who died in the accident ranged from 1 to 70 years old; nine were members of a single family visiting from Indianapolis. None of the passengers or crew were wearing a life jacket when the boat sank.

== Investigation and aftermath ==
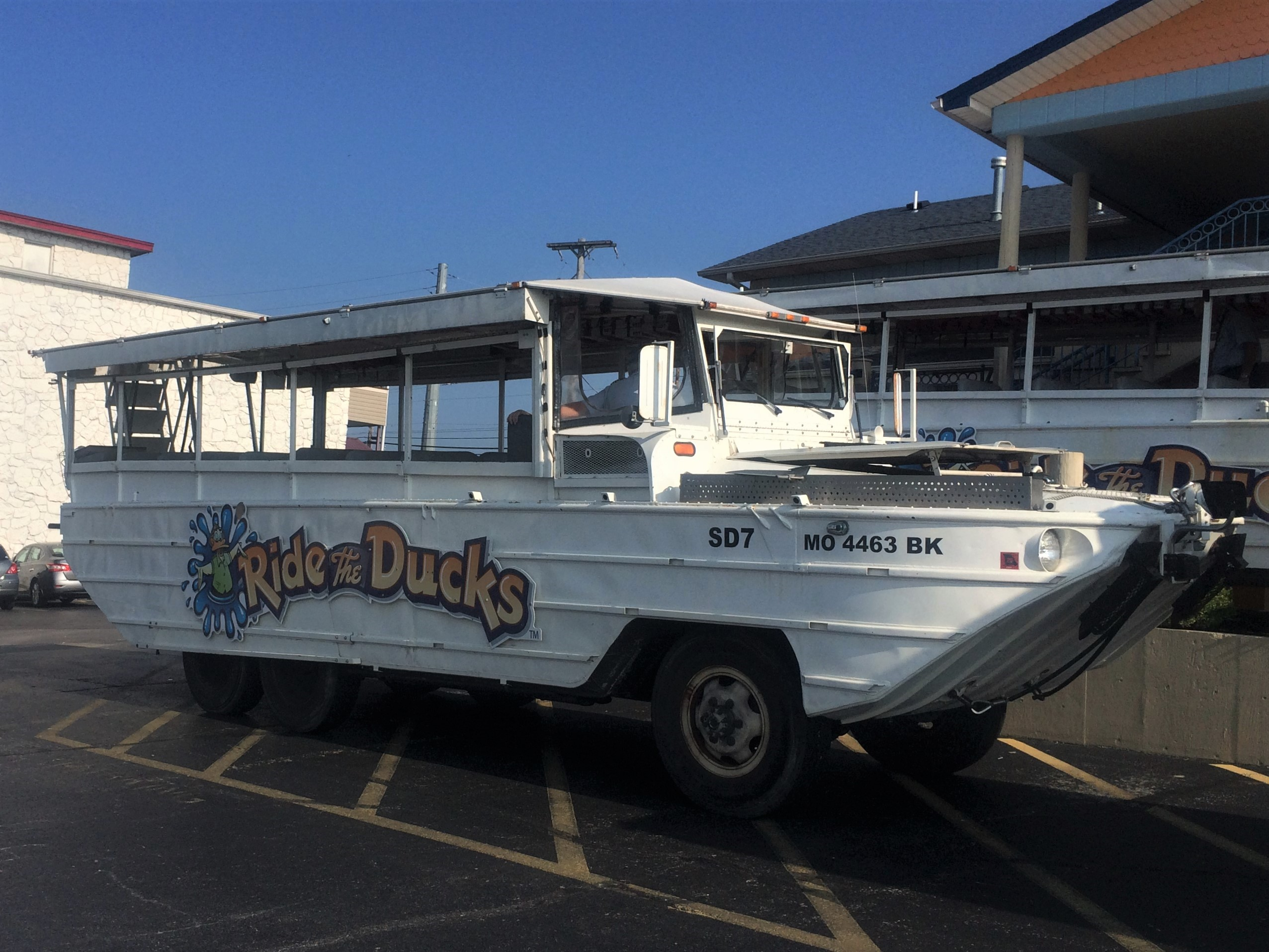
The boat involved in the accident

The National Transportation Safety Board (NTSB) dispatched investigators to the accident site the following day. In response to previous incidents involving duck boats, the NTSB had issued strong warnings about the design of the vehicles and the danger posed to passengers by their overhead canopies. Tia Coleman lost nine family members in the accident; she claimed that the crew specifically told passengers not to put on life jackets because they would not need them.

Jim Pattison Jr., president of Ripley Entertainment (who bought the Ride the Ducks Branson location in 2017), told the media that the storm "came out of nowhere", then moved through the area and led to the accident. The day following the accident, Ride the Ducks announced that the Branson operation would be "closed for business" pending an investigation and out of respect for the victims' families; the company also announced that it would pay for funeral and medical expenses for the passengers on board the boat.

Stone Mountain Park near Atlanta, Georgia, suspended their duck boat rides the day after the accident.

The boat was raised from the bottom of the lake in an operation supervised by the US Coast Guard on July 23, 2018, after being examined and photographed by divers. Divers also recovered a recording device from the boat, about 80 feet (24 m) below the surface.

In November 2019, a safety recommendation report was issued by the NTSB, stating that the "Coast Guard has repeatedly ignored safety recommendations that could have made tourist duck boats safer and potentially prevented" the Table Rock duck boat accident. "These safety issues were identified almost 20 years prior to the sinking of the Stretch Duck 7 and remain relevant to this accident," the report said. The NTSB said in their report that the boats' low freeboard and open interior make duck boats "vulnerable to rapid swamping and sinking" when they are suddenly flooded. The safety report also found that a fixed canopy and closed side curtain impeded passenger escape and likely caused more deaths.

== Legal ==
A federal indictment against the boat's captain, Kenneth Scott McKee, was announced on November 8, 2018. McKee was charged with 17 counts of misconduct, negligence, or inattention to duty by a ship's officer, resulting in death. According to the indictment, McKee allegedly "failed to properly assess incoming severe weather both prior to and after entering the water" of the lake and he "entered the vessel onto the water while there was severe weather, including high winds and lightning approaching the area". In June 2019, Curtis P. Lanham, general manager of Ride the Ducks Branson, and Charles V. Baltzell, operations supervisor who was acting as a manager on duty, were indicted by a federal grand jury for multiple felonies related to the accident. McKee was also subject to additional charges.

In September 2020, a federal magistrate judge recommended dismissing the criminal charges against the three men indicted, reasoning that "Table Rock Lake is not considered a navigable waterway under admiralty law", and the case should be handled at the state level. In December 2020, the federal judge dismissed all the charges against the three employees, based upon his recommendation and reasoning in September.

In July 2021, state charges were filed by the Stone County prosecutor against McKee, Lanham, and Baltzell. McKee, who was the captain, was charged with 17 felony counts of first-degree involuntary manslaughter, 5 counts of first-degree endangering the welfare of a child (class A felony) for the 5 children who perished, and 7 counts of first-degree endangering the welfare of a child (a class D felony) for the 7 children who survived. McKee is accused of "failing to exercise his duties as a licensed captain by taking his amphibious vehicle onto the lake during a thunderstorm". Lanham and Baltzell were each charged with 17 felony counts of first-degree involuntary manslaughter, and are accused of failing to relay the weather conditions that day, and also "failing to cease operations during a severe thunderstorm warning".

In April 2022, all the state charges against the three employees were dismissed. The judge reasoned that the "unique characteristics of the boat led to it rapidly sinking, and the staff was aware of the storm, but there is no evidence they were aware of the storm's 'gust front'." The judge additionally opined that he did not feel like the "evidence supports those levels of criminal intent as defined by statute." Missouri Attorney General Eric Schmitt said "we're disappointed in the court's decision", and our office hopes to refile charges and continue this case. Two days after the dismissal, Schmitt's office refiled identical charges against the three employees. In December 2025, a Stone County judge dismissed the charges against the three employees, ruling there was "no probable cause in the case."

=== Additional lawsuits ===
A federal lawsuit was filed on July 29, 2018, for US$100 million on behalf of two members of an Indiana family that lost nine people in the accident. The suit accused Ride the Ducks of ignoring warnings that had been issued about the weather prior to the accident and continuing to use boats with design flaws that made them susceptible to sinking. In March 2019, a confidential settlement was reached for relatives of the two members of the family from Indiana.

An additional federal lawsuit was filed on September 4, 2018, by Tia Coleman, who was aboard the boat during the incident. Coleman's husband and three children were among those that drowned.

In November 2018, a confidential settlement was reached with Ripley Entertainment on behalf of two daughters of a couple from Higginsville, Missouri. The couple was celebrating their 45th wedding anniversary when they died on the duck boat ride.

In January 2020, the final lawsuit against Ripley Entertainment was settled for an undisclosed amount. In total, 31 lawsuits were filed against the company, and all settled for undisclosed amounts.

== See also ==
- List of disasters in the United States by death toll
