= Table Rock Lake =

Reservoir in Arkansas and Missouri, U.S.

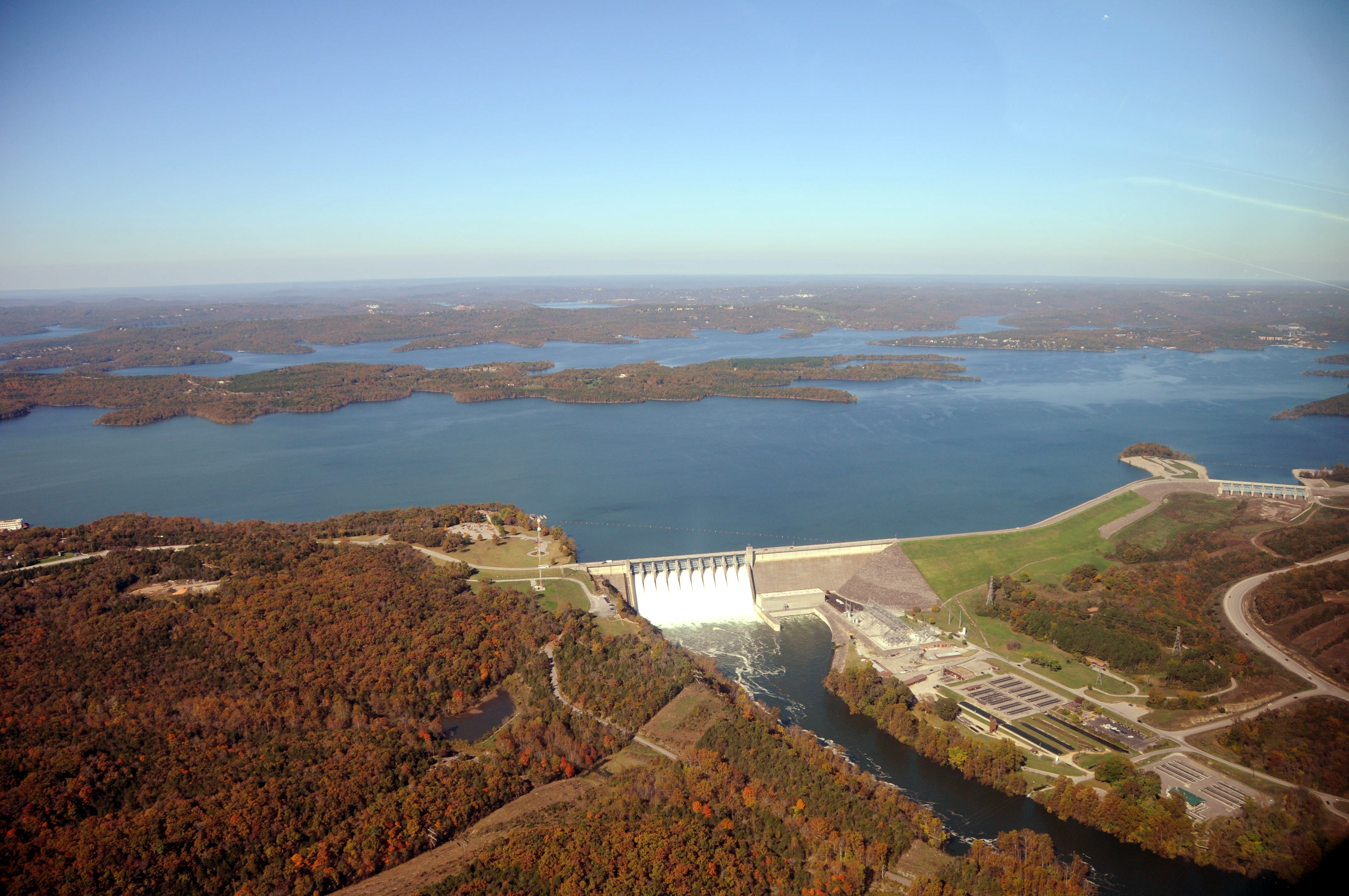
- An aerial photo of Table Rock Dam, completed in 1958, in Branson, Missouri, which impounds the White River and forms Table Rock Lake

- Location within Missouri Location within the United States
- Location: Missouri / Arkansas
- Coordinates: 36°34′00″N 93°18′0″W
- Type: Reservoir
- Primary inflows: White River; James River; Kings River
- Primary outflows: White River
- Basin countries: United States
- Managing agency: U.S. Army Corps of Engineers
- Surface area: 43,100 acres (174 km^{2})
- Max. depth: 220 ft (67 m)
- Water volume: 3,462,000 acre⋅ft (4.270 km^{3})
- Shore length^{1}: Flood pool: 857 mi (1,379 km) Normal pool: 745 mi (1,199 km)
- Surface elevation: 915 ft (279 m)
- Settlements: Branson, Missouri; Shell Knob, Missouri; Cape Fair, Missouri; Hollister, Missouri
- ^{1} Shore length is not a well-defined measure.

Table Rock Lake is an artificial lake or reservoir in the Ozarks of southwestern Missouri and northwestern Arkansas in the United States. Designed, built and operated by the U.S. Army Corps of Engineers, the lake is impounded by Table Rock Dam, which was constructed from 1954 to 1958 on the White River creating the lake.

The lake is a popular attraction for the city of Branson, Missouri, and the nearby town of Shell Knob, Missouri. There are several commercial marinas along the lake, and Table Rock State Park is located on the east side, both north and south of Table Rock Dam. Downstream from the dam, the Missouri Department of Conservation operates a fish hatchery, which is used to stock trout in Lake Taneycomo, which begins immediately downstream from the Table Rock Dam. The cold water discharged from the dam creates a trout fishing environment in the lake.

The lake derives its name from a rock formation resembling a table at the small community of Table Rock, Missouri, on Highway 165 about a mile and a half downstream from where the dam was built.

== Lake temperature ==
The lake area temperature varies according to season:

- Spring: 56 to 77 °F (25 °C)
- Summer: 85 to 90 °F (32 °C)
- Fall: 71 to 82 °F (28 °C)
- Winter: 42 to 47 °F (8 °C)

== Lake data ==
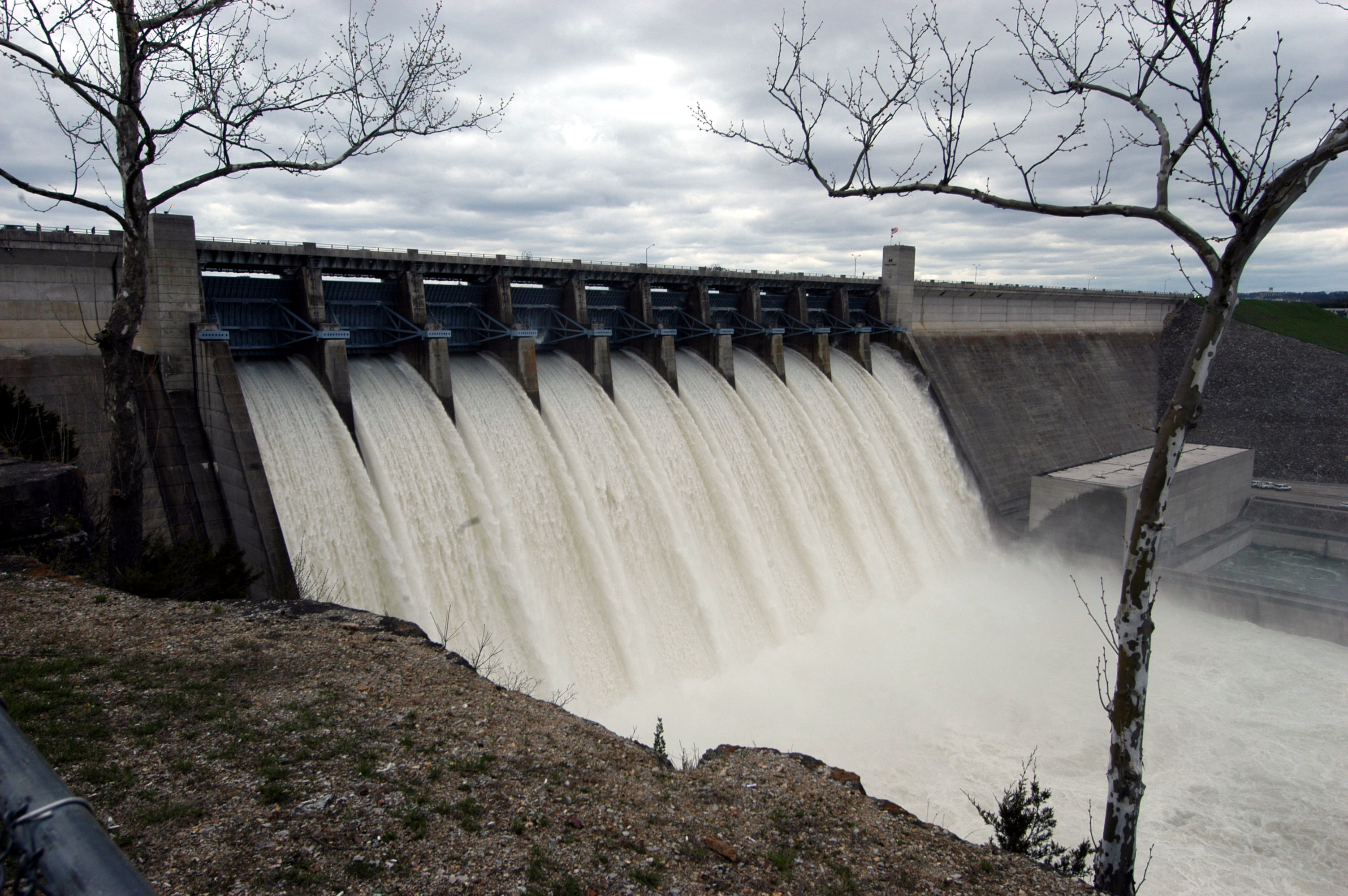
Table Rock Dam during the April 2008 flood with all flood gates open

Dam and Outlet Measurements

- Length of dam: 6,423 feet (1,958 m)
- Length of concrete section: 1,602 feet (488 m)
- Maximum height of dam above stream bed: 252 feet (77 m)
- Concrete in dam: 1,230,000 cubic yards (940,000 m^{3})
- Earthen embankment: 3,320,000 cubic yards (2,540,000 m^{3})
- Length of spillway: 551 gross feet
- Spillway crest gates size: 45x37 feet
- Outlet conduits size: 4x9 feet

Dam elevations above mean sea level

- Top of dam: 947 feet (289 m)
- Spillway crest: 896 feet (273 m)

Lake elevations above mean sea level

- Top of flood control pool: 931 feet (284 m)
- Top of normal pool: 915 feet (279 m)

Surface area of lake

- Flood control pool: 52,300 acres (212 km^{2})
- Normal pool: 43,100 acres (174 km^{2})

Maximum storage capacity

- Flood control pool: 760,000 acre-feet (940,000,000 m^{3})

Shoreline length

- Flood control pool: 857 miles (1,379 km)
- Normal pool: 745 miles (1,199 km)

Other

- Power drawdown and dead: 2,702,000
- Lake total: 3,462,000

Power generating data

- Number of generating units: 4
- Rated capacity for each unit: 50 megawatts
- Station installed capacity: 200 megawatts

== Flood control ==
=== Construction ===
The original purpose of the reservoir was flood control on the White River, receiving congressional authorization under the Flood Control Act of 1941. Table Rock Dam, constructed from 1954 to 1958 at a cost of $65 million, confines Table Rock Lake and generates hydroelectric power. The reservoir has a fluctuation of 16 feet (4.9 m). When the reservoir is above the maximum flood pool, excess water goes over the auxiliary overflow spillway at the north end of the dam.

=== 2005 Dam Safety Project ===
Table Rock Dam’s spillway capacity was evaluated as a result of a dam safety program in the 1990s. Using improved weather data and more modern technology and safety requirements, engineers determined that the lake would rise ten feet higher during the worst-case flood than previously calculated. An event of this magnitude would overtop the earthen embankment and destroy Table Rock Dam with catastrophic losses in downstream areas, including Branson. After considering several options and gathering considerable public input, an auxiliary spillway was determined to be the best solution. The auxiliary spillway was completed in 2005 at a cost of approximately $65,000,000.

Summary of projections:

- At elevation 931 Table Rock Lake is at full flood capacity or flood pool. Water may begin to splash over the top of the closed Tainter gates and some of them usually begin to be slightly opened to accommodate additional lake inflow from the White River Basin including the James River and Beaver Lake discharge. If the Tainter Gates are not opened to release water via the dam spillway, water from the lake will begin to spill over those closed gates by approximately 933 feet.
- At elevation 937 Table Rock Lake is 6 feet above flood capacity. All ten Tainter gates are opened wider in an effort to stabilize reservoir rise. Outflow from the Lake under these circumstances will be nearing 200-300 thousand cubic feet per second (CFS).
- At elevation 942 Table Rock Lake is 11 feet above flood capacity and at its "design pool", or the maximum elevation that the reservoir is engineered to reach, under "probable maximum flood" scenarios. The dam’s ten Tainter gates will be fully raised to their maximum height of approximately 30 feet, releasing 550 thousand CFS into Lake Taneycomo. This scenario would effectively submerge and destroy the powerhouse, power transmission grid, hatchery, and wreak serious destruction downstream.
- At elevation 947 Table Rock Dam would be at its maximum capacity and water would be at the very top of the dam. The auxiliary spillway would be brought online, in concert with Table Rock’s fully opened floodgates. This catastrophic or "last resort" protocol releases 1 million CFS of into Taneycomo and deals dreadful destruction to Branson, Hollister, Point Lookout and possibly the Powersite Dam. At this point there is a danger of water overtopping the concrete dam and breaching the earthen structure, which imminently leads to cataclysmic structural failure and the uncontrolled release of the Table Rock Lake impoundment—nearly 3 million CFS of water.

=== Historic Levels ===
Table Rock Lake has a record crest of 935.47 feet, which occurred on April 27, 2011.

In December 2015, the dam released 72,001 CFS at its peak. This is the highest amount ever released.

== Facilities and State Park ==
Sixteen public campgrounds are located around Table Rock Lake. Campgrounds are managed by several different agencies and campsites range from full-hookup to non-electric tent sites For details about each of the US Army Corps of Engineers parks, check out Recreation.gov.

The US Army Corps of Engineers Dewey Short Visitor Center is located 6 miles west of US Hwy 65 on Missouri State Hwy 165 at the south end of Table Rock Dam.

The visitor center has exhibits about the White River Watershed, local habitats, Table Rock Dam, and the US Army Corps of Engineers as well as several interactive exhibits including maps, power generation and water safety. It also features an overlook which allows visitors to view Table Rock Lake, the dam, and Lake Taneycomo from one viewing deck. The center shows a 20 minute film entitled, "Taming of the Riviera Blanche". This film is an introduction to the Table Rock Lake/White River area and details the construction and purpose of Table Rock Dam.

The visitor center features a public-use dock, picnic areas, fishing, a lakeshore trail.

Table Rock State Park provides public access to the lake. Six miles from Branson and located just south of the dam and outlet, facilities include a boat launch and full service marina (including cafe, boat rental and scuba dive shop), campground (including full RV hookups and a yurt), fishing access, swimming access (no beach), picnic area, amphitheater, hiking and mountain bike trails, and dump station.

On July 19, 2018, a duck boat carrying tourists capsized from severe weather.

== Tourism and Recreation ==
Table Rock Lake is major outdoor recreation hot spot. The lake offers many activities including camping, boating, cliff jumping, scuba diving, and other outdoor activities. Areas surrounding the lake claim over 10 million visitors each year. Outside of water activities, a popular tourist destination is Big Cedar Lodge's Top of the Rock. The destination offers scenic views, a par-3-course by golfer, Jack Nicklaus. In 2015, a sinkhole opened at Top of the Rock Ozark Heritage Preserve. The sinkhole has since become an attraction for new discovery.
