= List of water parks in the Americas =

The following is a list of water parks in the Americas sorted by region.

== North America ==
=== Bahamas ===
- Aquaventure, Nassau (part of Atlantis Paradise Island)
- CocoCay

=== Canada ===
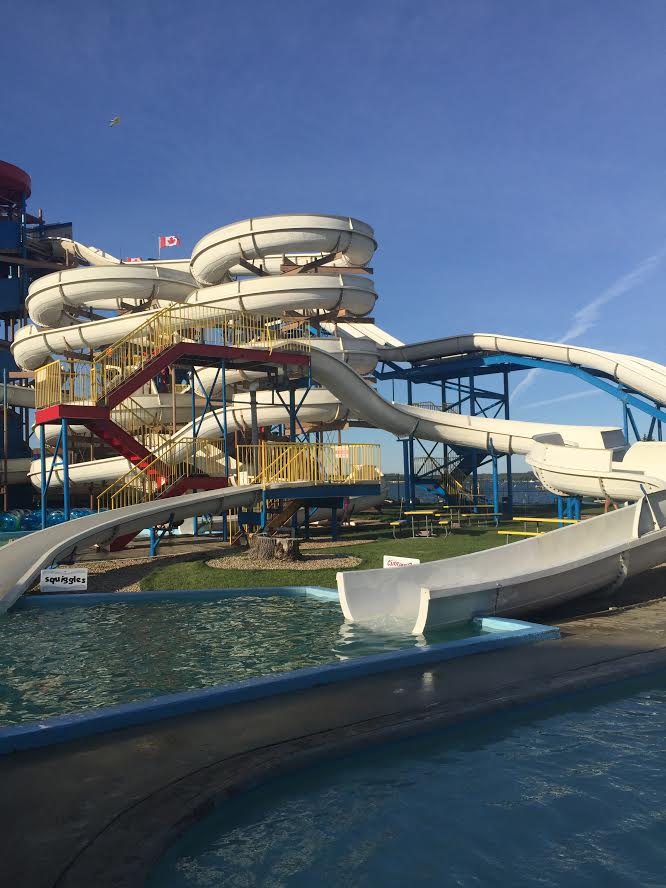
A Canadian waterslide park

==== Alberta ====
- World Waterpark, Edmonton

==== British Columbia ====
- Cultus Lake Waterpark
- Splashdown Vernon, Spallumcheen

==== New Brunswick ====
- Magic Mountain, Moncton

==== Ontario ====
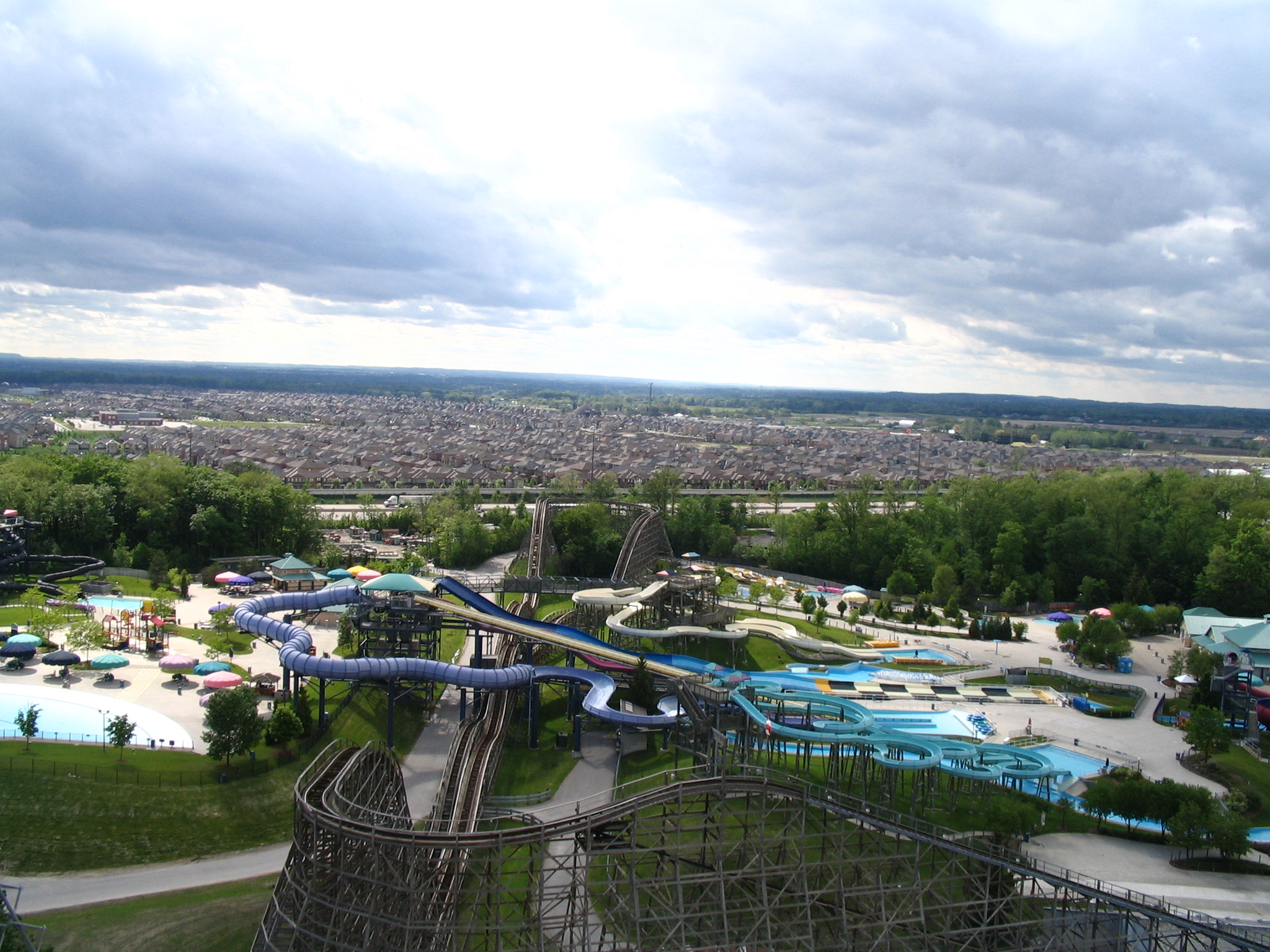
Splash Works

- Calypso Park, Limoges
- Fallsview Indoor Waterpark, Niagara Falls
- Great Wolf Lodge, Niagara Falls
- Splash Island, Toronto Zoo, Toronto
- Splash Works, Canada's Wonderland, Vaughan
- Wet'n'Wild Toronto, Brampton

==== Quebec ====
- Amazoo, Granby
- Mont Saint-Sauveur, Saint-Saveur

=== Costa Rica ===
- Kalambu Hot Springs, La Fortuna, San Carlos

=== Dominican Republic ===
- Memories Splash, Punta Cana

=== Guatemala ===
- Xocomil

=== Mexico ===
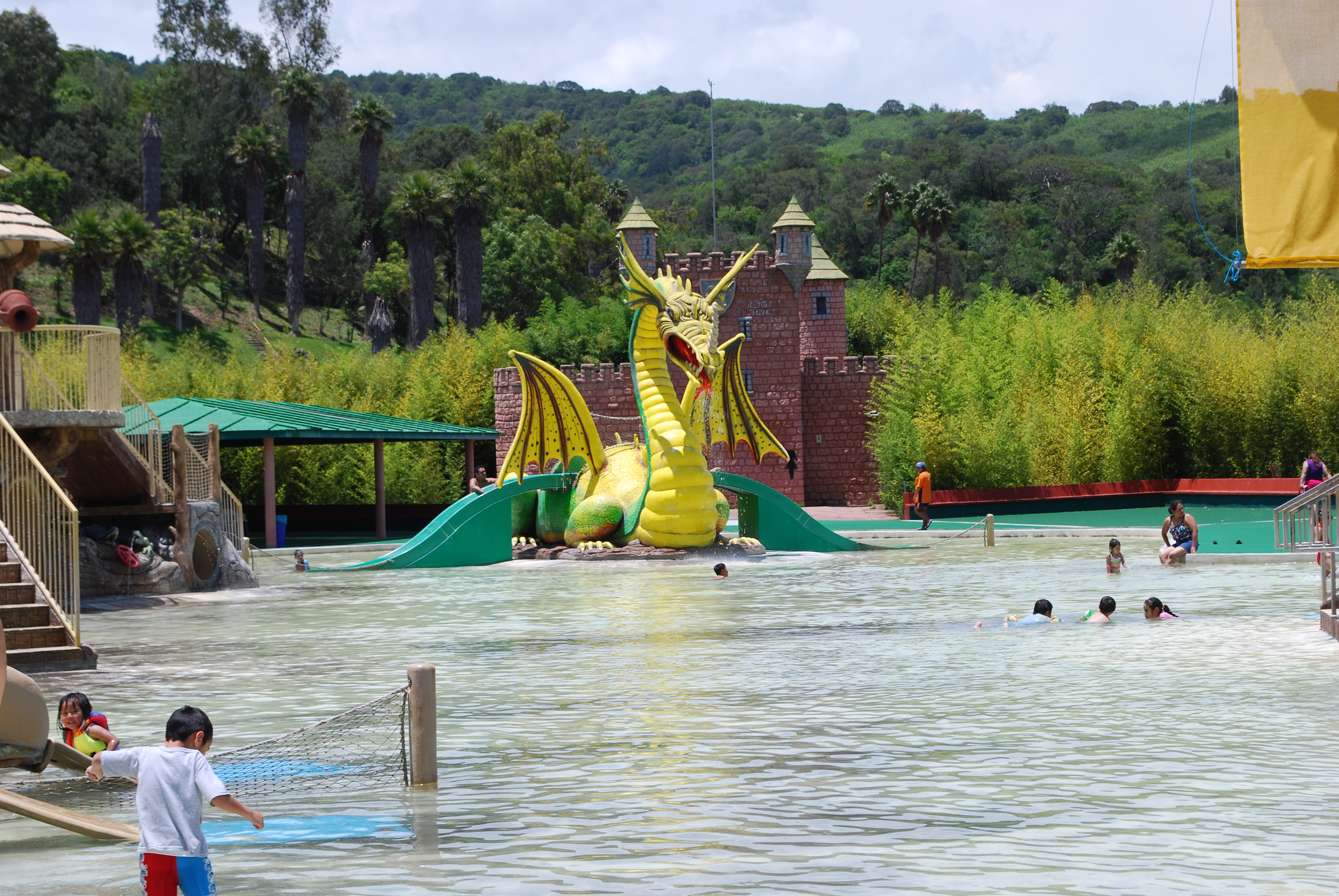
Dragon in a kiddie pool of Parque Acuatico Ixtapan

- Agua Caliente, Jalisco
- Albercas El Vergel, Tijuana
- El Rollo Morelos
- Parque Acuático Cici Acapulco Mágico, Acapulco
- Parque Acuático Corral Grande, Guadalajara
- Parque Acuático Ixtapan, State of Mexico
- Parque Acuático Tepetongo, Michoacán
- Parque Acuático Temixco, Morelos
- Tephe, Hidalgo

=== Puerto Rico ===
- Las Cascadas Water Park, Aguadilla

=== St. Lucia ===
- Coconut Bay Beach Resort & Spa, Vieux Fort Quarter

=== United States ===
==== Alabama ====
- Alabama Adventure & Splash Adventure, Bessemer
- Spring Valley Beach, Blountsville
- Waterville USA, Gulf Shores

==== Alaska ====
- H2Oasis, Anchorage

==== Arizona ====
- Golfland Sunsplash, Mesa
- Great Wolf Lodge, Scottsdale
- Six Flags Hurricane Harbor Phoenix, Phoenix

==== Arkansas ====
- Arkadelphia Aquatic Park, Arkadelphia
- Magic Springs, Hot Springs

==== California ====
- Aqua Adventure, Fremont
- Buccaneer Cove at Castle Park, Riverside
- Dry Town Water Park, Palmdale
- Gilroy Gardens water play areas, Gilroy
- Golfland Emerald Hills, San Jose
- Golfland Sunsplash, Roseville
- Great Wolf Lodge, Garden Grove
- Great Wolf Lodge, Manteca
- Knott's Soak City, Buena Park
- Legoland Water Park, Carlsbad
- Mulligan Family Fun Center, Murrieta
- Palm Springs Surf Club, Palm Springs
- Raging Waters Los Angeles, San Dimas
- Sengme Oaks Water Park, Pauma Valley
- Sesame Place San Diego, Chula Vista
- Six Flags Hurricane Harbor Concord, Concord
- Six Flags Hurricane Harbor Los Angeles, Valencia
- South Bay Shores, Santa Clara
- Splash Pad Park, Oakland
- Super Silly Fun Land, Universal City
- WaterWorks Park, Redding
- Wild Rivers, Irvine

==== Colorado ====
- Adventure Island, Greeley
- Bay Aquatic Park, Broomfield
- Brighton Oasis Family Aquatic Park, Colorado Springs
- Island Kingdom, Denver
- Glenwood Hot Springs Pool, Glenwood Springs
- Great Wolf Lodge, Colorado Springs
- Pirates Cove, Littleton
- The Great Outdoors, Lafayette
- Water World, Federal Heights

==== Connecticut ====
- Lake Compounce, Bristol
- Great Wolf Lodge, Mashantucket
- Ocean Beach Park, New London
- Splash Away Bay Water Park, Middlebury

==== Delaware ====
- Jungle Jim's Adventure World, Rehoboth Beach
- Killens Pond, Felton
- Midway Speedway Park, Rehoboth Beach
- Thunder Lagoon Waterpark, Fenwick Island

==== Florida ====
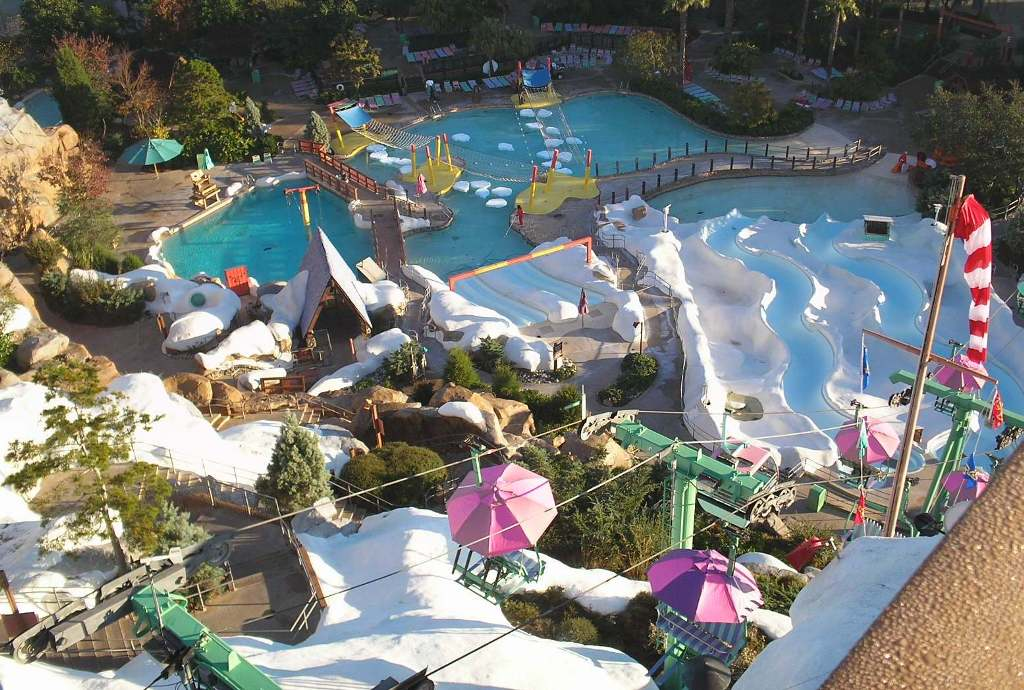
View from the top of Disney's Blizzard Beach

- Adventure Island, Tampa
- Adventure Landing, Jacksonville Beach
- Aquatica, Orlando
- Big Kahuna's, Destin
- Buccaneer Bay at Weeki Wachee Springs, Weeki Wachee
- Calypso Bay, Royal Palm Beach
- CoCo Key Water Resort, Orlando
- Daytona Lagoon, Daytona Beach
- Disney's Blizzard Beach, Bay Lake (part of Walt Disney World)
- Disney's Typhoon Lagoon, Lake Buena Vista (part of Walt Disney World)
- Flamingo Waterpark Hotel & Resort, Kissimmee
- Island H2O Live!, Kissimmee
- Legoland Water Park, Winter Haven
- Lion Country Safari, Loxahatchee
- Paradise Cove, Pembroke Pines
- Rapids Water Park, West Palm Beach
- Reunion Resort Water Park, Kissimmee
- Sailfish Splash Waterpark, Stuart
- Splash City Adventures, Pensacola
- Shipwreck Island Waterpark, Jacksonville Beach
- Shipwreck Island Waterpark, Panama City Beach
- Ship Wreck Island, Kissimmee
- Splash Harbour, Indian Rocks Beach
- Sun Splash Family Waterpark, Cape Coral, Florida
- Sun-N-Fun Lagoon, Naples, Florida
- Universal Volcano Bay, Orlando (part of Universal Orlando)

==== Georgia ====
- Great Wolf Lodge, LaGrange
- Helen Water Park, Helen
- High Falls Water Park, Jackson
- Lanier Islands Beach and Water Park, Buford
- Malibu Norcross, Norcross
- Rigby's Water World, Warner Robins
- Sandy Beach, Macon
- Seven Springs, Powder Springs
- Six Flags Hurricane Harbor, Austell
- Six Flags White Water, Marietta
- SOAKya Water Park, Rossville
- Southern Pines Water Park, Dublin
- Splash in the Boro, Statesboro
- Splash Island, Valdosta
- Summer Waves, Jekyll Island

==== Hawaii ====
- Aulani, Kapolei
- Wet'n'Wild Hawaii, Kapolei

==== Idaho ====
- Boulder Beach, Athol
- Lava Hot Springs Waterpark, Lava Hot Springs
- Raptor Reef, Hayden
- Rexburg Rapids, Rexburg
- Roaring Springs Water Park, Meridian
- Silver Rapids, Kellogg

==== Illinois ====
- Centennial Aquatic Center, Park Ridge
- Centennial Park Aquatic Center, Orland Park
- Collinsville Aqua Park, Collinsville
- Cypress Cove Family Aquatic Park, Woodridge
- Dolphin Cove Family Aquatic Center, Carpentersville
- Great Wolf Lodge, Gurnee
- Grizzly Jack's Grand Bear Resort, North Utica
- Knight's Action Park, Springfield
- Mystic Waters, Des Plaines
- Otter Cove Aquatic Park, St. Charles
- Paradise Bay Water Park, Lombard
- Pelican Harbor Waterpark, Bolingbrook
- Philips Park Family Aquatic Center, Aurora
- Pirate's Cay, Sheridan
- Rainbow Falls Water Park, Elk Grove Village
- Pirates Cove, Elk Grove Village
- Raging Rivers, Grafton
- Raging Waves, Yorkville
- Six Flags Hurricane Harbor Chicago, Gurnee
- Six Flags Hurricane Harbor Rockford, Cherry Valley
- Splash Country, Aurora
- Splash Cove, Decatur
- Splash Valley Aquatic Park, Kankakee
- Turtle Splash Water Park, West Chicago
- White Water Canyon, Tinley Park

==== Indiana ====
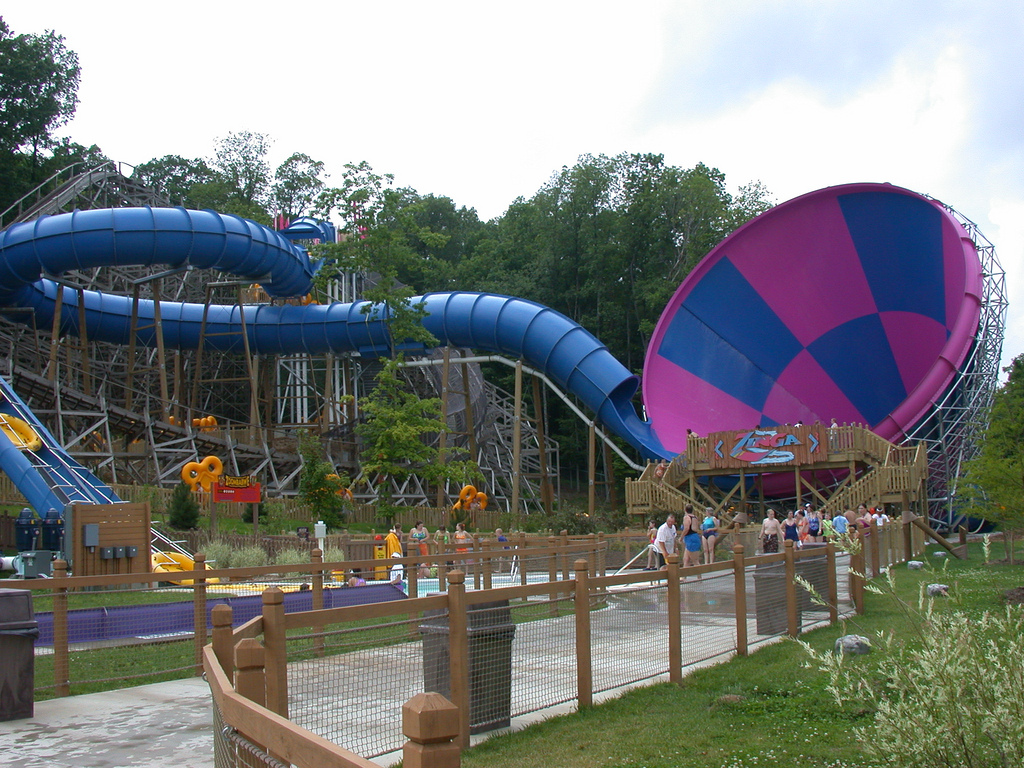
Zinga at Splashin' Safari

- Atlantis Water Park, Clarksville
- Big Splash Adventure, French Lick
- Deep River Waterpark, Crown Point
- Ideal Beach, Elkhart
- Indiana Beach, Monticello
- Kennedy Water Park, South Bend
- Kokomo Beach Family Aquatic Center, Kokomo
- Murphy Aquatic Park, Avon
- Pine Lake, Berne
- Splash House, Marion
- Splashin' Safari, Santa Claus
- Splash Island, Plainfield
- Tropicanoe Cove, Lafayette
- Yogi Bear's Jellystone Park WaterFun, Fremont

==== Iowa ====
- Adventureland, Altoona
- Grand Harbor Resort and Waterpark, Dubuque
- Huck's Harbor, Burlington
- King's Pointe, Storm Lake
- Lost Island Water Park, Waterloo
- The Beach Ottumwa Ottumwa
- Wasserbahn Indoor Waterpark, Williamsburg

==== Kansas ====
- Great Wolf Lodge, Kansas City
- Long Branch Lagoon, Dodge City
- Parrot Cover, Garden City
- Rock River Rapids, Derby
- Kenwood Cove Aquatic Park, Salina
- Garden Rapids at The Big Pool, Garden City

==== Kentucky ====
- Kentucky Kingdom and Hurricane Bay, Louisville
- Kentucky Splash Waterpark, Williamsburg
- SomerSplash Waterpark, Somerset
- Splash Lagoon Water Park, Bowling Green (part of Beech Bend Park)
- Venture River Water Park, Eddyville

==== Louisiana ====
- Blue Bayou, Baton Rouge
- Liberty Lagoon, Baton Rouge
- SPAR Waterpark, Sulphur
- Splash Kingdom, Shreveport

==== Maine ====
- Aquaboggan, Saco
- Funtown Splashtown USA, Saco
- Wild Acadia, Trenton

==== Maryland ====
- Jolly Roger's Splash Mountain, Ocean City

==== Massachusetts ====
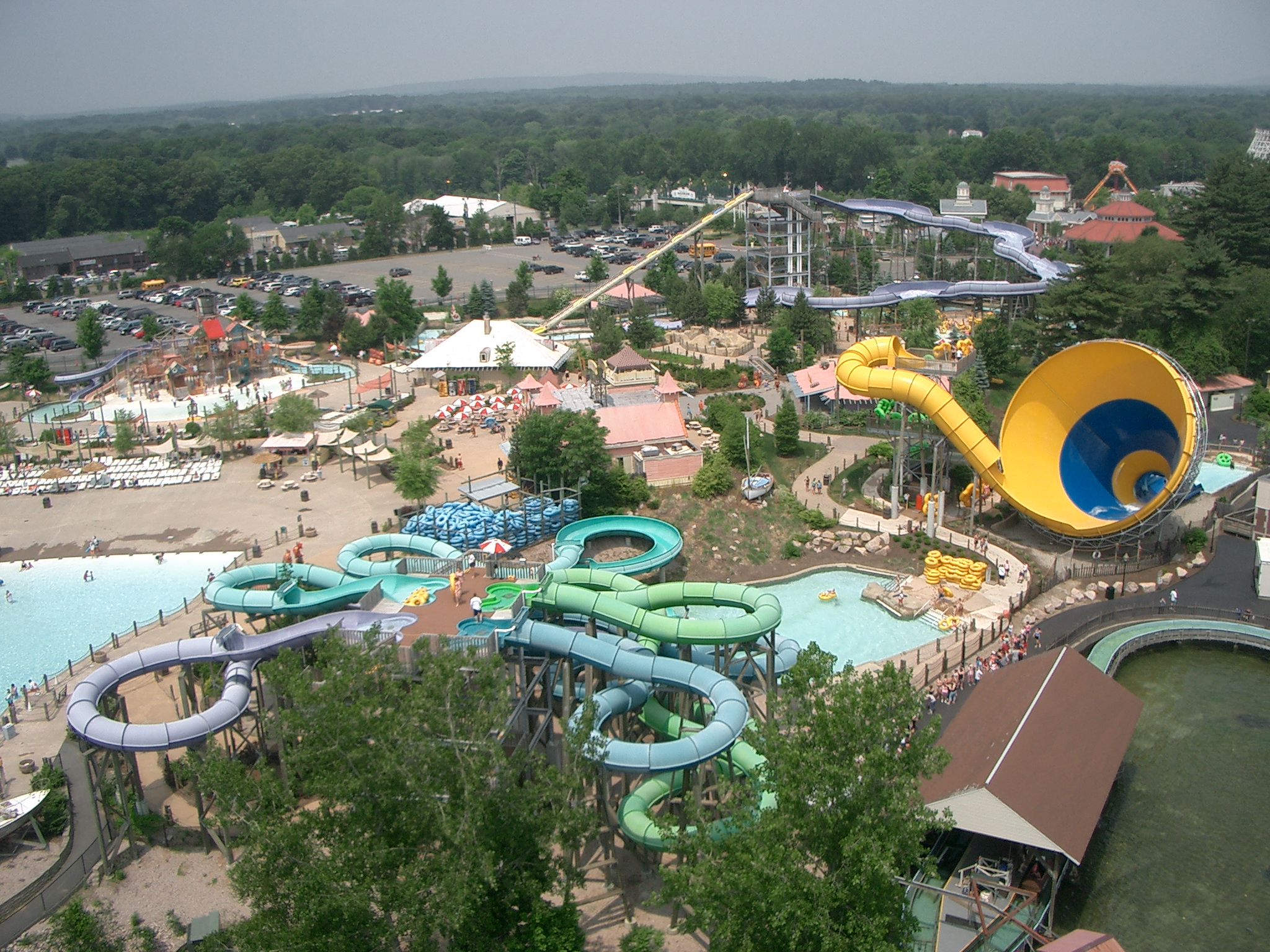
The water park at Six Flags New England

- Cape Codder Water Park, Barnstable
- Great Wolf Lodge, Fitchburg
- Six Flags Hurricane Harbor, Agawam
- Water Park of New England, Middleton
- Water Wizz, Wareham
- Wicked Waves Water Park, Yarmouth

==== Michigan ====
- Adventure Island Family Fun Park, Cadillac
- Avalanche Bay, Boyne Falls
- Bavarian Inn Lodge, Frankenmuth
- Bridge Vista Beach Hotel, Mackinaw City
- Gold Rush Indoor Waterpark, Rothbury
- East Lansing Family Aquatic Center, East Lansing
- Full Blast, Battle Creek
- Great Wolf Lodge, Traverse City
- Island Resort & Casino, Harris
- Rolling Hills Water Park, Ypsilanti
- Soaring Eagle Waterpark and Hotel, Mount Pleasant
- Surfari Joe's Waterpark, Watervliet
- Splash Universe, Dundee
- Wyndham Garden Sterling Heights
- WildWater Adventure, Muskegon (part of Michigan's Adventure)
- Zehnder's Splash Village, Frankenmuth

==== Minnesota ====
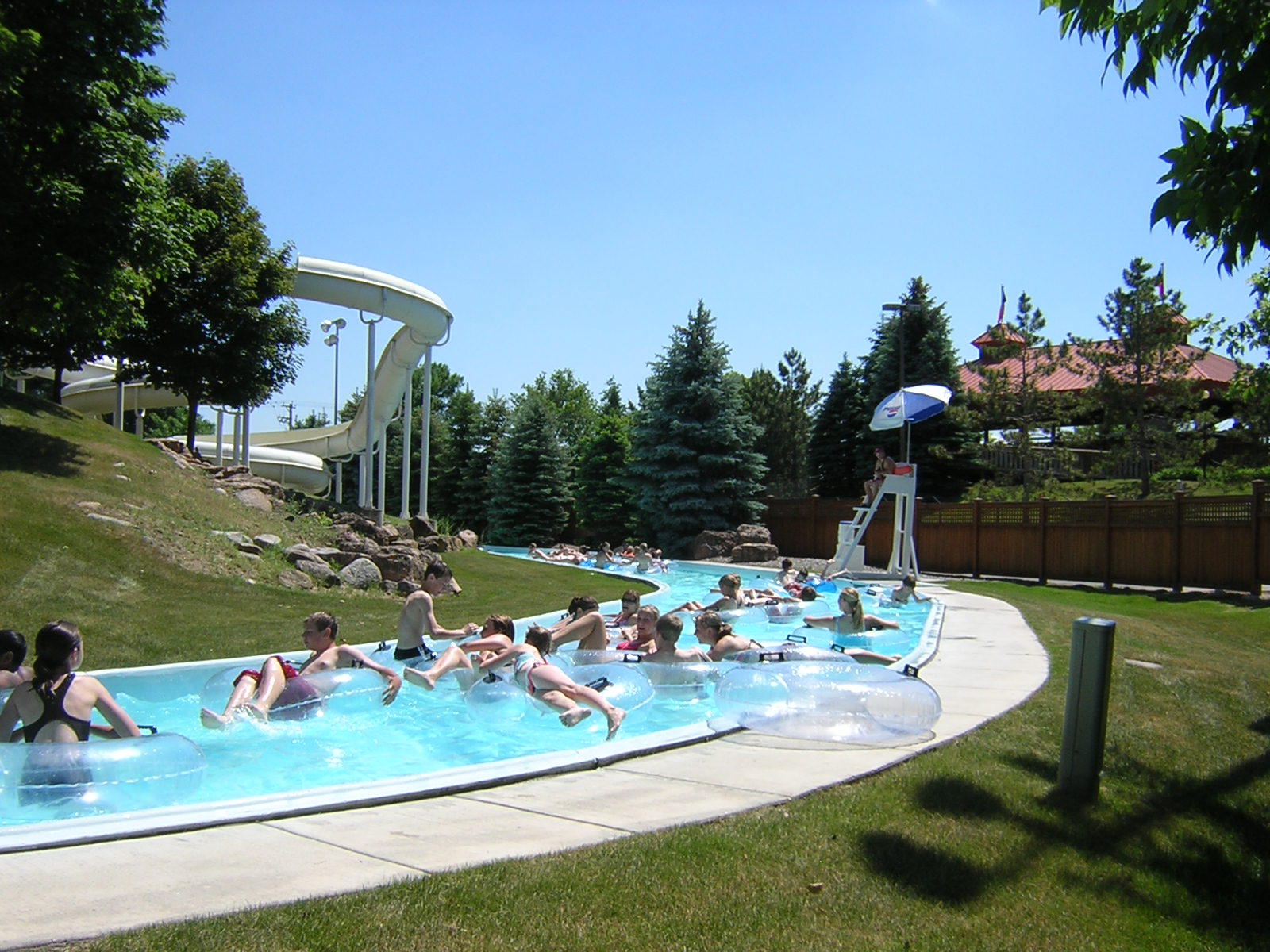
"Ripple Rapids" at Soak City

- Bunker Beach, Coon Rapids
- Cascade Bay, Eagan
- Superior Shores, Shakopee
- Great Wolf Lodge, Bloomington
- Venetian Indoor Water Park, Maple Grove
- Wild Mountain Waterslides, Taylor Falls
- Edina Aquatic Center, Edina
- Wild Woods Waterpark, Otsego
- Three Bear Waterpark, Baxter
- The Edge Waterpark, Duluth

==== Mississippi ====
- Barnacle Bill's Water Park and Mini Golf, Waveland
- Flint Creek Water Park, Wiggins
- Geyser Falls, Choctaw
- Gulf Islands Waterpark, Gulfport

==== Missouri ====
- Adventure Oasis, Independence
- Aquaport, Maryland Heights
- Super Splash USA, Lake of the Ozarks
- Castle Rock Resort, Branson
- Farmington Water Park, Farmington
- Grand Country Resort, Branson
- Cape Splash Family Aquatic Center, Cape Girardeau
- Oceans of Fun, Kansas City
- Six Flags Hurricane Harbor, Eureka
- Splash Landing, Monroe City
- Summit Waves, Lee's Summit
- Tan-Tar-A Resort, Osage Beach
- The Bay Water Park, Kansas City
- White Water, Branson
- Republic Aquatic Park, Republic

==== Montana ====
- Big Sky Water Park, Columbia Falls
- Electric City Water Park, Great Falls
- The Reef Indoor Water Park, Billings

==== Nebraska ====
- Aquacourt Pool, Hastings
- AquaVenture. Norfolk
- Fremont Splash Station Fremont
- Fun-Plex, Omaha
- Island Oasis, Grand Island
- Mahoney Family Aquatic Center, Ashland
- Pawnee Plunge, Columbus
- Sidney Water Park, Sidney
- Star City Shores, Lincoln
- Westmoor Pool, Scottsbluff

==== Nevada ====
- Circus Circus Splash Zone, Las Vegas
- Cowabunga Bay, Henderson
- Cowabunga Canyon Waterpark, Spring Valley
- Wild Island, Sparks

==== New Hampshire ====
- Castaway Island at Canobie Lake Park, Salem
- Clark's Bears, Lincoln
- Hampton Inn and Suites, North Conway
- Santa's Village, Jefferson
- Water Country, Portsmouth
- Whale's Tale Water Park, Lincoln

==== New Jersey ====
- Breakwater Beach, Seaside Heights
- Clementon Park & Splash World, Clementon
- DreamWorks Water Park, East Rutherford
- Funplex, Mount Laurel
- Mountain Creek Waterpark, Vernon Township
- Land of Make Believe, Hope
- Ocean Oasis Water Park and Beach Club, Wildwood
- OC Waterpark, Ocean City
- Raging Waters Water Park, Wildwood
- Runaway Rapids Waterpark, Keansburg
- Big Kahuna's, West Berlin (Formerly Sahara Sam's)
- Six Flags Hurricane Harbor, Jackson
- SplashPlex, East Hanover
- Splash Zone Water Park, Wildwood
- Thundering Surf Waterpark, Beach Haven
- The Water Main, West Berlin

==== New Mexico ====
- Cliff's Amusement Park, Albuquerque
- White's City Resort & Waterpark, White's City

==== New York ====
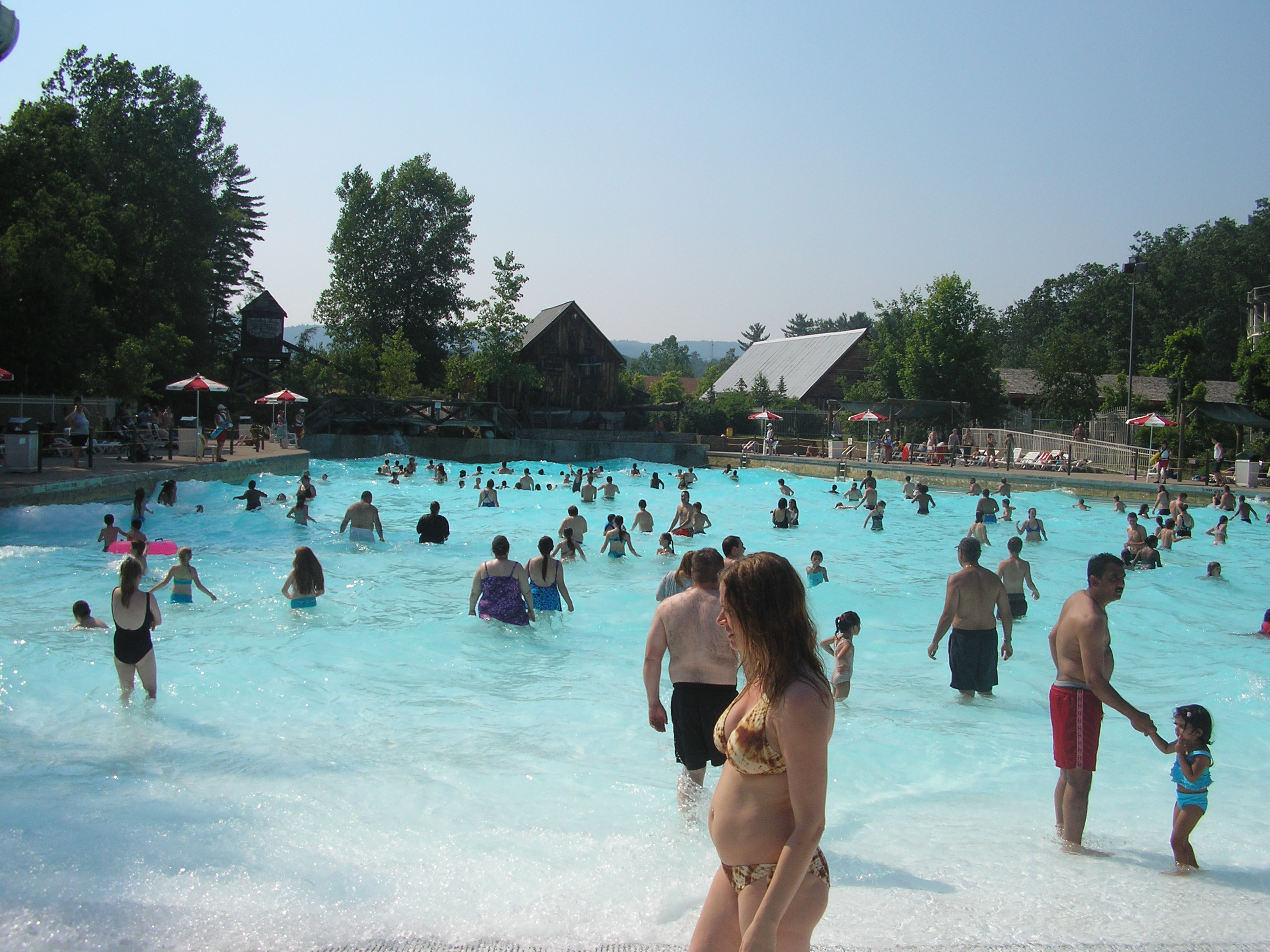
Splashwater Kingdom

- Enchanted Forest Water Safari, Old Forge
- The Great Escape & Splashwater Kingdom, Queensbury
- Kartrite Resort & Indoor Waterpark, Monticello
- Roseland Waterpark, Canandaigua
- Seabreeze Raging Rivers, Rochester
- Six Flags Great Escape Lodge & Indoor Waterpark, Queensbury
- Splashdown Beach, Fishkill
- Splish Splash, Riverhead
- Palm Island Indoor Waterpark, Batavia
- Six Flags Hurricane Harbor, Darien
- Thunder Island, Fulton
- Zoom Flume, East Durham

==== North Carolina ====
- Carolina Harbor, Charlotte
- Fantasy Lake, Hope Mills
- Great Wolf Lodge, Concord
- H2OBX, Powells Point
- Jungle Rapids, Wilmington
- Lions Water Adventure, Kinston
- Ray's Splash Planet, Charlotte
- Splasheville, Asheville
- Wet 'n Wild Emerald Pointe, Greensboro

==== North Dakota ====
- Raging Rivers Water Park, Bismarck
- Roosevelt Park (Minot), Minot
- Splash Down Dakota Water Park, Minot
- Splasher's of the South Seas at Canad Inns, Grand Forks
- Williston ARC, Williston

==== Ohio ====
- Adventure Reef Water Park, Kettering
- Akron Canton Jellystone Park, Uniontown
- Baylor Beach Park, Beach City
- Black Beard's Bay Waterpark, Edgerton
- Big Splash, Grove City
- Bowling Green City Pool & Waterpark, Bowling Green
- Castaway Bay, Sandusky
- Cedar Point Shores, Sandusky
- Clay's Park Resort, Canal Fulton
- Comfort Inn Splash Harbor, Bellville
- Coshocton Lake Park Recreational Complex, Coshocton
- Fairfield Aquatic Center, Fairfield, Ohio
- Funtimes Fun Park, Alliance
- Gameday Bay, Canton (Opening 2025)
- Great Wolf Lodge, Mason
- Great Wolf Lodge, Sandusky
- Groveport Aquatic Center, Groveport
- Kalahari Resort and Convention Center, Sandusky
- Kroger Aquatic Center, Kroger
- Lincoln Park Family Aquatic Center, Marion
- Long's Retreat Family Resort, Latham
- Main Street Aquatic Center, Eaton, Ohio
- Marietta Aquatic Center, Marietta
- Mt Healthy City Pool, Mt Healthy
- Nelsonville Water Park, Nelsonville
- Pioneer Waterland & Dry Fun Park, Chardon
- Roof Park Pool, Maumee
- Soak City, Mason
- The Beach at Adventure Landing, Mason
- The Watering Hole Safari and Waterpark, Port Clinton
- Troy Aquatic Park, Troy
- Twinsburg Water Park, Twinsburg
- Uhrichsville Water Park, Uhrichsville
- Wapakoneta WaterPark, Wapakoneta
- Zoombezi Bay, Powell

==== Oklahoma ====
- Comanche Nation Waterpark, Lawton
- Frontier City, Oklahoma City
- OKANA, Oklahoma
- Paradise Beach Waterpark, Tulsa
- SplashZone, Enid
- Sun-n-Fun Waterpark, Ponca City
- Water-Zoo Clinton Indoor Water Park, Clinton
- White Water Bay, Oklahoma City

==== Oregon ====
- Evergreen Wings and Waves Waterpark, McMinnville
- North Clackamas Aquatic Park, Milwaukie
- SHARC, Sunriver
- Splash! at Lively Park, Springfield

==== Pennsylvania ====
- Aquatopia (Pennsylvania), Tannersville
- Carousel Water and Fun Park, Beach Lake
- Camelbeach Waterpark, Tannersville
- DelGrosso's Amusement Park, Tipton
- Dutch Wonderland, Lancaster
- Great Wolf Lodge, Pocono Mountains
- Idlewild and Soak Zone, Ligonier
- Kalahari Resort and Convention Center, Pocono Mountains
- Knoebels Amusement Resort, Elysburg
- Lakemont Park, Altoona
- Montage Mountain Waterpark, Scranton
- Sandcastle Waterpark, Pittsburgh
- Sesame Place Philadelphia, Langhorne
- Splash Lagoon, Erie
- Split Rock Resort, Lake Harmony
- The Boardwalk at Hersheypark, Hershey
- Waldameer & Water World, Erie
- WildRiver Waterpark, Entriken
- Wildwater Kingdom, Allentown

==== Rhode Island ====
- Yawgoo Valley Ski Area & Water Park, Exeter

==== South Carolina ====
- Myrtle Waves, Myrtle Beach
- Whirlin’ Waters Adventure Waterpark, Charleston
- Wild Water & Wheels, Surfside Beach

==== South Dakota ====
- Evan's Plunge Indoor Pool & Mineral Spa, Hot Springs
- WaTiki Indoor Waterpark, Rapid City
- Wild Water West, Sioux Falls

==== Tennessee ====
- Dollywood's Splash Country, Pigeon Forge
- Nashville Shores, Nashville
- Ober Gatlinburg, Gatlinburg
- Soaky Mountain, Sevierville
- Wild Bear Falls Water Park, Gatlinburg
- Wilderness at the Smokies, Sevierville

==== Texas ====
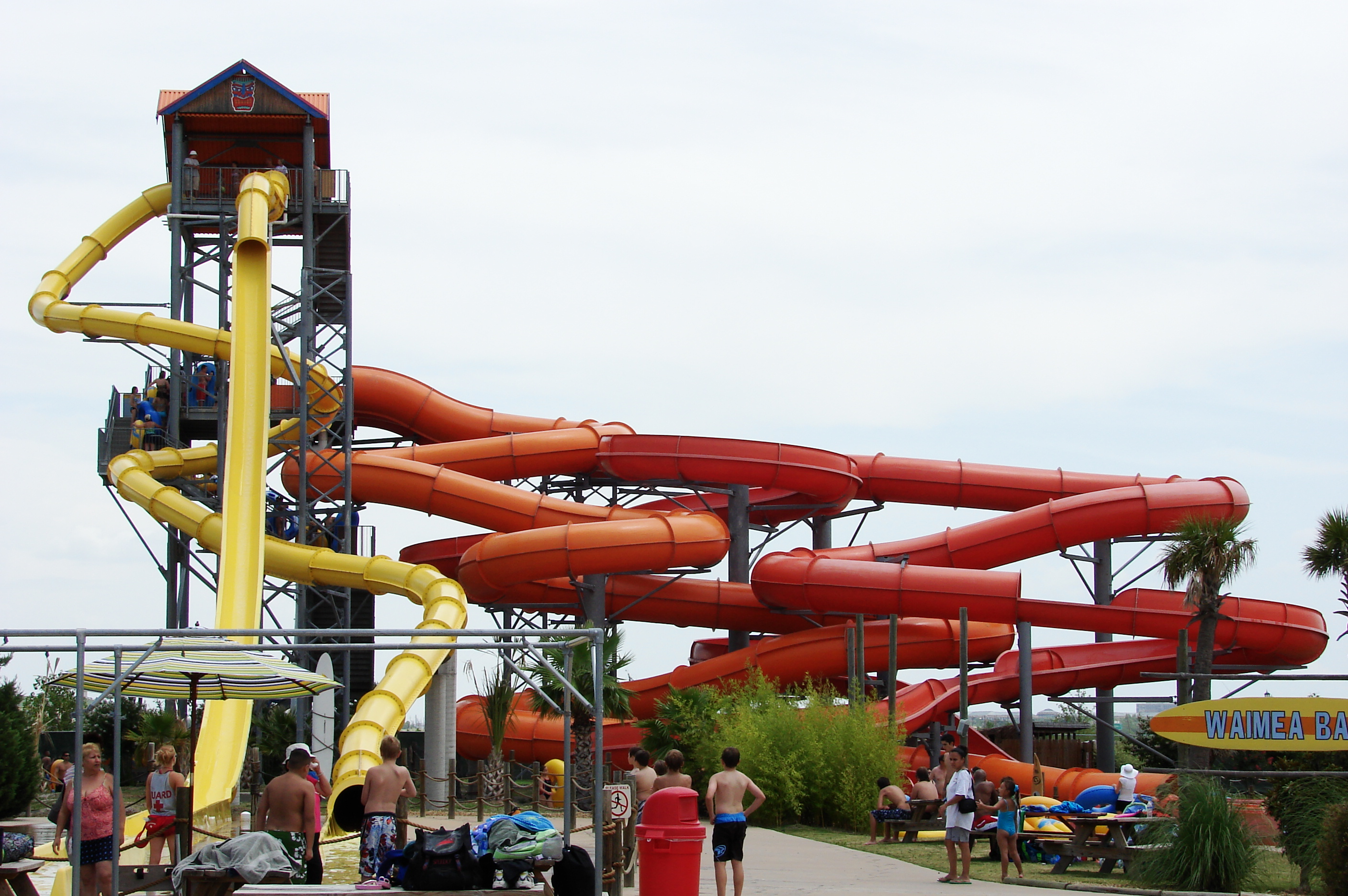
Hawaiian Falls, Garland

- Aquatica, San Antonio
- Bahama Beach, Dallas
- Boomtown Bay, Burke
- Castaway Cove, Wichita Falls
- Epic Waters Indoor Waterpark, Grand Prairie
- Great Wolf Lodge, Grapevine
- Great Wolf Lodge, Webster
- Hawaiian Falls, Garland, The Colony, Mansfield, Roanoke, and Waco
- Hurricane Alley Waterpark, Corpus Christi
- Kalahari Resort and Convention Center, Round Rock
- Lubbock Water Rampage, Lubbock
- Joyland Amusement Park, Lubbock
- Morgan's Inspiration Island, San Antonio
- NRH2O Family Water Park, North Richland Hills
- Palm Beach at Moody Gardens, Galveston (part of Moody Gardens)
- Pirates Bay Waterpark, Baytown
- Schlitterbahn, New Braunfels
- Six Flags Hurricane Harbor, Arlington
- Six Flags Hurricane Harbor SplashTown, Spring
- Splash Kingdom Waterpark, Canton, Greenville, and Nacogdoches
- Splash Kingdom Wild West, Weatherford
- Splashtown San Antonio, San Antonio
- Splashway, Sheridan
- Surf and Swim, Garland
- Texas Tides Water Park, Galveston
- Typhoon Texas, Austin and Katy
- Wet N' Wild Waterworld, Anthony
- Volente Beach, Leander
- Water Works Park, Denton
- Waves Resort Corpus Christi, Corpus Christi
- White Water Bay, San Antonio
- ZDT's Amusement Park, Seguin

==== Utah ====
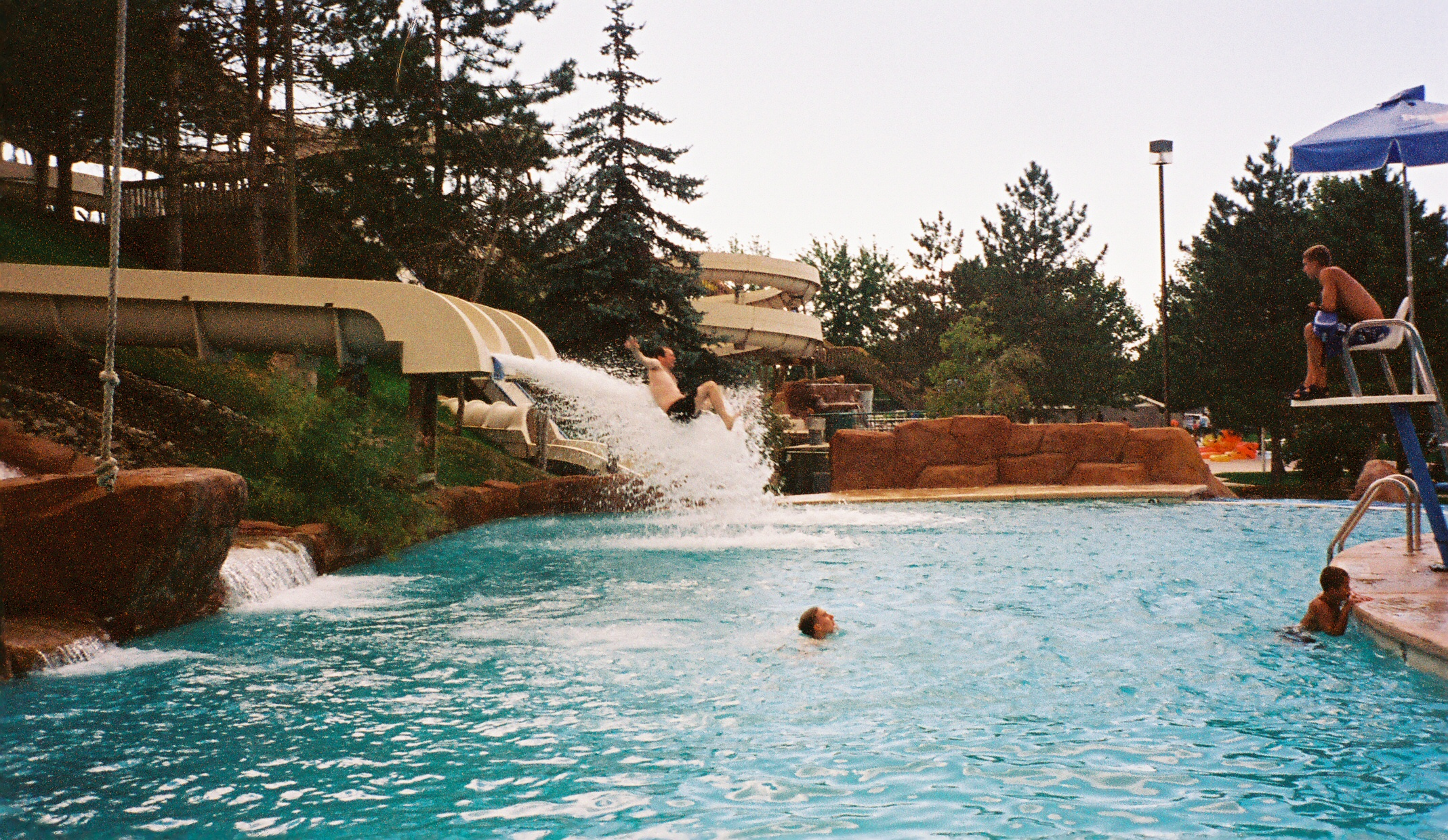
A section of Seven Peaks Water Park

- Cherry Hill Resort, Kaysville
- Cowabunga Bay, Draper
- Lagoon-A-Beach, Farmington
- Splash Summit Water Park, Provo

==== Vermont ====
- Smugglers' Notch Water Park, Jeffersonville
- Pump House Indoor Waterpark, Jay

==== Virginia ====
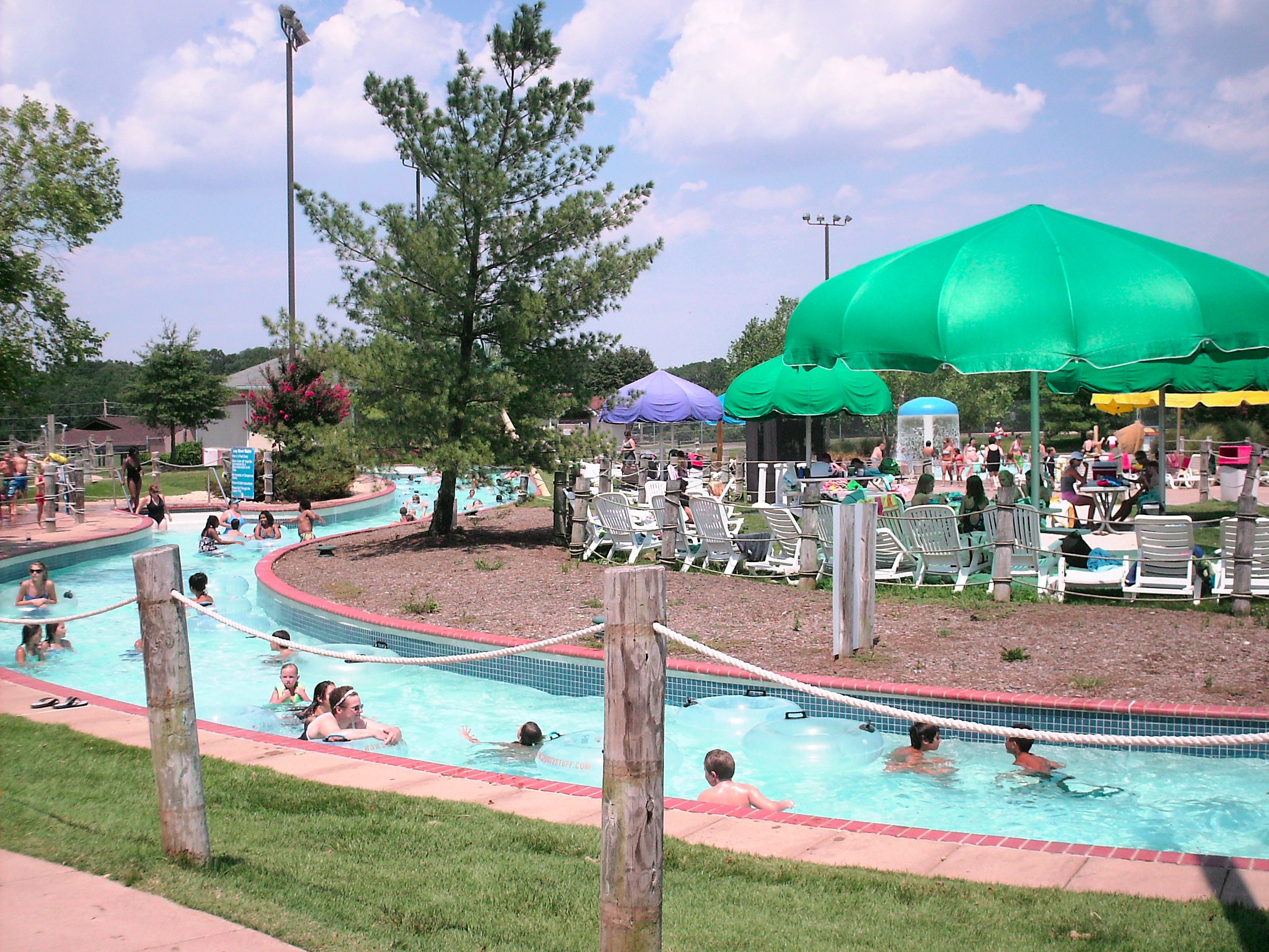
Splash Down Waterpark, near Manassas, Virginia

- Atlantis Waterpark, Centreville
- Great Waves Waterpark, Alexandria
- Great Wolf Lodge, Williamsburg
- Massanutten Waterpark, McGaheysville
- Maui Jack's Waterpark, Chincoteague
- Ocean Breeze Waterpark, VirginiaBeach
- Ocean Dunes Waterpark, Arlington
- Pirates Cove Waterpark, Lorton
- Splash Down Waterpark, Manassas
- Splash Valley Waterpark, Roanoke
- Volcano Island Waterpark, Sterling
- Water Country USA, Williamsburg
- Water Mine Family Swimmin' Hole, Reston
- Soak City, Doswell

==== Washington ====
- Birch Bay Waterslides, Blaine
- Great Wolf Lodge, Grand Mound
- Slidewaters, Chelan
- Splashdown Waterpark, Spokane Valley
- Wild Waves, Federal Way

==== West Virginia ====
- Waves of Fun, Hurricane

==== Wisconsin ====
- Alakai Resort, Wisconsin Dells
- Atlantis Waterpark Hotel, Wisconsin Dells
- Breaker Bay Waterpark, Sheboygan (part of Blue Harbor Resort)
- Carousel Inn, Wisconsin Dells
- Chaos Water Park, Eau Claire
- Chula Vista Resort, Wisconsin Dells
- Cranberry Country Lodge, Tomah
- Crawdaddy Cove, Madison
- Grand Lodge Waterpark Resort, Rothschild
- Grand Marquis Resort, Wisconsin Dells
- Great Wolf Lodge, Wisconsin Dells
- Holiday Inn Express Wisconsin Dells, Wisconsin Dells
- Kalahari Resort and Convention Center, Wisconsin Dells
- Meadowbrook Resort, Wisconsin Dells
- Mt. Olympus Water & Theme Park, Wisconsin Dells
- New Concord Inn, Wisconsin Dells
- Noah's Ark, Wisconsin Dells
- Polynesian Resort Hotel, Wisconsin Dells
- RainTree Waterpark Resort, Wisconsin Dells
- Ramada Plaza Hotel Indoor Water Park, Green Bay
- SkyLine Indoor Water Park and Hotel, Wisconsin Dells
- The Springs Water Park, Pewaukee
- Three Bears Lodge, Warrens
- Timber Ridge Lodge, Lake Geneva
- Tundra Lodge, Green Bay
- Waters of Minocqua, Minoqua
- Wilderness Territory, Wisconsin Dells
- Wintergreen Resort, Wisconsin Dells
- Wisconsin Rapids Aquatic Center, Wisconsin Rapids

==== Wyoming ====
- Casper Family Aquatic Center, Casper
- Cheyenne Aquatic Center, Cheyenne
- Gillette Recreation Pool, Gillette
- Hellie's Tepee Pool, Thermopolis
- Pinedale Aquatic Center, Pinedale
- Star Plunge, Thermopolis

== South America ==
=== Argentina ===
- Aquapolis, Mar del Plata, Buenos Aires
- Aquasol, Mar del Plata, Buenos Aires
- Aquafun, Tigre, Buenos Aires
- Infinito Water Park, Córdoba, Córdoba

=== Brazil ===
- Acqua Lokos Parque Hotel, Capão da Canoa, Rio Grande do Sul
- Acquamania, Guarapari, Espírito Santo
- Acquamania Foz, Foz do Iguaçu, Paraná
- Acquamotion, Gramado, Rio Grande do Sul
- Acquaventura Carneiros, Tamandaré, Pernambuco
- Água Show Park, Florianópolis, Santa Catarina
- Aldeia das Águas, Barra do Piraí, Rio de Janeiro
- Arraial d’Ajuda Eco Parque, Porto Seguro, Bahia
- Bali Park Resorts, Luziânia, Goiás
- Beach Park, Fortaleza, Ceará
- Blue Beach, Suzano, São Paulo
- Blue Park, Foz do Iguaçu, Paraná
- diRoma Acqua Park, Caldas Novas, Goiás
- Hot Beach, Olímpia, São Paulo
- Hot Park, Rio Quente, Goiás
- Lagoa Parques e Hotéis, Caldas Novas, Goiás
- Magic City, Suzano, São Paulo
- Thermas Acqualinda, Andradina, São Paulo
- Thermas da Mata, Cotia, São Paulo
- Thermas do Vale, São José dos Campos, São Paulo
- Thermas dos Laranjais, Olímpia, São Paulo
- Thermas Hot World, Águas de Lindoia, São Paulo
- Thermas Water Park, São Pedro, São Paulo
- Veneza Water Park, Paulista, Pernambuco
- Water Park, Caldas Novas, Goiás
- Wet 'n Wild, Vinhedo, São Paulo

=== Colombia ===
==== Antioquia ====
- Aeropark Juan Pablo II, Medellín
- Kanaloa Water Park, Santa Fe de Antioquia
- Ditaires Complex, Itagui
- Parque Comfama Rionegro, Rionegro
- Parque Comfama Itagüi, Itagui
- Parque Comfama La Estrella, La Estrella
- Parque Comfama Arví, Medellín
- Parque Comfama San Ignacio, Medellín
- Parque Comfama Aranjuez, Medellín
- Parque Comfama Barrio Perez, Bello
- Parque Comfama Centro, Bello
- Parque Los Tamarindos, San Jerónimo

==== Bolivar ====
- Takurika Recreational Center, Cartagena

==== Cundinamarca ====
- CiCi Aquapark, Bogotá
- Las Palmeras Vacay Center, Villeta
- CODEMA Park, Villeta
- Mosquera Water Park, Mosquera

==== Huila ====
- Juncal Beach, Palermo, Huila

==== Meta ====
- Parque Cacayal, Castilla la Nueva

==== Santander ====
- Cable Wake Park, Barrancabermeja

==== Tolima ====
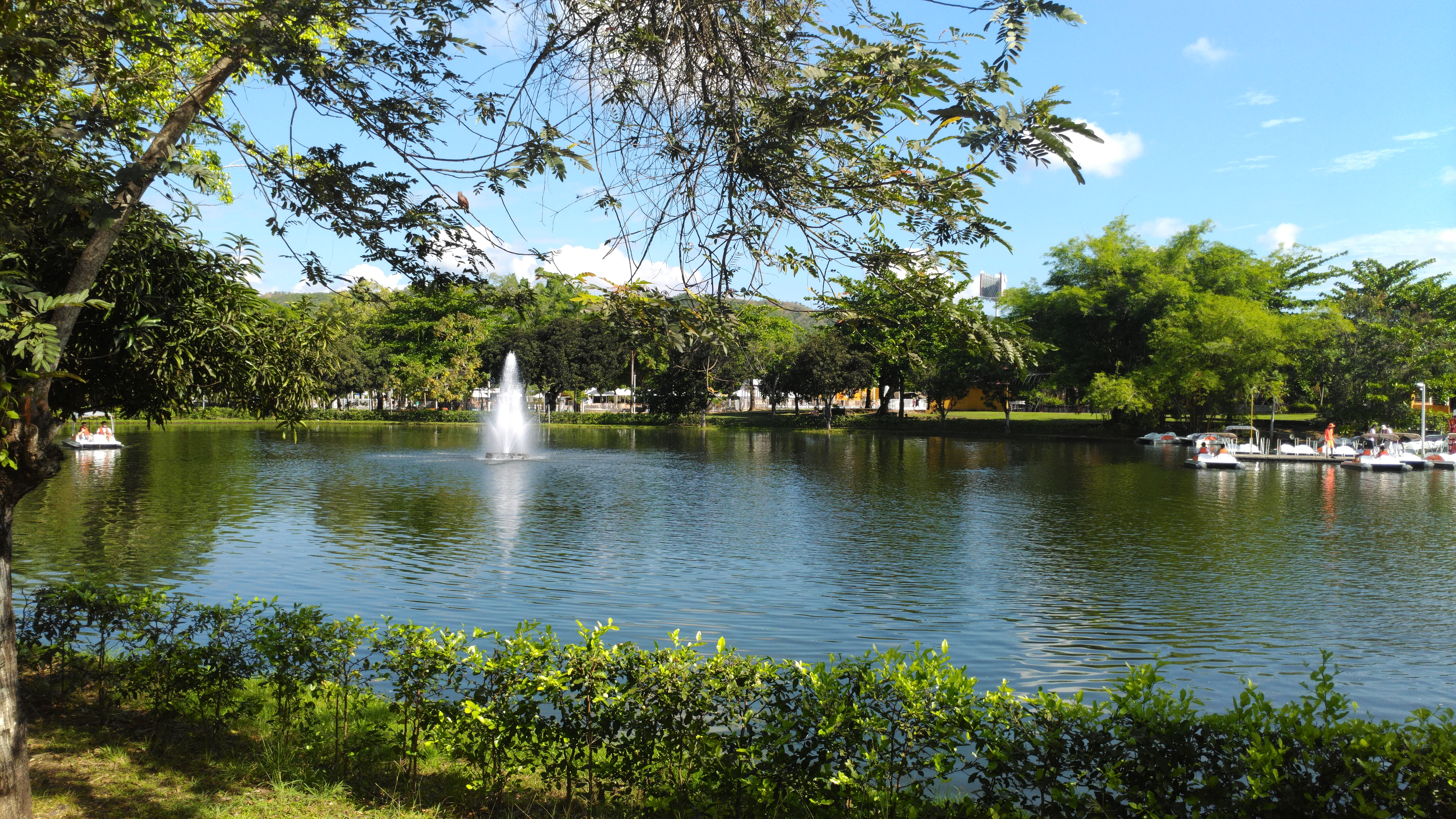
Lagosol Water Park at Melgar, Tolima, Colombia

- Piscilago, Melgar
- Lagosol, Melgar
- Inflaparque Ikarus, Melgar
- Parque Nacional del Agua, Melgar

==== Valle del Cauca ====
- De la Caña Aquapark, Cali

=== Paraguay ===
- Rakiura, Asunción
- Parque Acuático El Dorado, Encarnación

=== Peru ===
- Los Toboganes de las Tres Ruedas, Puente Piedra

=== Uruguay ===
- Acuamania, Salto

=== Venezuela ===
- Parque de Agua Kariña, Puerto la Cruz
- Playa Cuare, Falcón

== See also ==
- List of water parks
- List of amusement parks
- List of amusement parks in the Americas
