= Water Works Park =

Water Works Park may refer to several places in the United States:

- Water Works Park (Tampa, Florida)
- Water Works Park (Des Moines), Iowa
- Water Works Park, site of Hurlbut Memorial Gate, in Detroit, Michigan
- WaterWorks Park, a water park in Redding, California

== See also ==
- Waterworks (disambiguation)
- WaterWorks (disambiguation)
