= El Vergel =

El Vergel may refer to:

- Albercas El Vergel, a water park in Tijuana, Baja California, Mexico
- El Vergel Airport, in Los Ríos, Chile
- El Vergel (Xochimilco Light Rail), a light rail station in Tlalpan, Mexico City
- El Vergel culture, an archaeological culture found in Chile
