= Bermad =

BERMAD CS Ltd.
- Company type: Private
- Industry: Irrigation; Fire protection; Waterworks; Construction; Mining
- Founded: January 17, 1965; 60 years ago
- Area served: International
- Key people: Moshik Treister (CEO)
- Number of employees: 700
- Website: www.bermad.com

BERMAD CS Ltd. is a developer and manufacturer of residential irrigation and water management systems for mining and construction.

The company was founded in 1965 as a producer of irrigation systems, mainly those found in agriculture. Its product offering includes a variety of industries, including filtration systems, reservoir management, air valves, water meters and fire protection solutions. Bermad has products that are marketed in 70 countries, through a number of subsidiaries and distributors around the world, including subsidiaries in the United States, the United Kingdom, Australia, Brazil, Mexico, China, France, Singapore, Italy, Spain and India.

== Divisions ==
Bermad is divided into four different business units or divisions, each aimed at a different industry or market.

=== Irrigation ===
Irrigation solutions have been the primary products developed since the founding of Bermad in 1965. The range of irrigation products includes hydraulic control valves and flow management products for a range of irrigation system types such as drip irrigation and sprinklers.

=== Buildings & construction ===
The company's building & construction business unit includes a number of flow and distribution management products aimed at the construction industry, such as pressure and level control, pump and flow, dry pipes, and deluge valves.

=== Waterworks ===
The waterworks unit offers pumping stations, water distribution grid networks and sewage management. This includes various water meters, pressure valves, and flow, pump, surge, level and burst control valves.

=== Fire Protection ===
The fire protection unit offers sprinkler and fire fighting systems, with a number of products for fail-safe and flow management of water and other fire protection fluids or foams.
