= El Vergel culture =

Archaeological culture found in Chile

El Vergel culture was a South American archaeological culture known in the historical region of Araucania, Chile. Its type site lies near the city of Angol. Earlier iterations of the culture are known as Vergel I later iterations, exhibiting Inca influence, are referred to as Vergel II.

== See also ==
- El Molle culture
- Cuel

== Bibliography ==
- Mostny, Grete (1983) [1981]. Prehistoria de Chile (in Spanish) (6th ed.). Santiago de Chile: Editorial Universitaria.
