= Daytona Lagoon =

Water park in Daytona Beach, Florida, US

- Interactive map of Daytona Lagoon
- Location: Daytona Beach, Florida, U.S.
- Coordinates: 29°13′48.55″N 81°0′41.82″W
- Opened: March 2005
- Owner: A subsidiary of United Parks
- Slogan: Daytona Beach's Most Exciting Family Fun Center and Waterpark!
- Operating season: Dry attractions are year-round 365 days per year and the waterpark is open from March to October.
- Area: Entertainment District

Attractions
- Total: 12 rides
- Website: www.daytonalagoon.com

Daytona Lagoon is a waterpark and family entertainment center located in Daytona Beach, which is owned by a subsidiary of national amusement park operator United Parks. Daytona Lagoon is open year-round for its dry attractions, while its waterpark operates from March through September. The park consists of 12 rides and an 18-hole miniature golf course.

== History ==
Originally built as Adventure Landing Daytona by Adventure Entertainment Company in 1998, it closed in 2002; Daytona Lagoon opened in March 2005.

On August 20, 2016, the Volusia County Council approved a lease, enabling a United Parks subsidiary to purchase Daytona Lagoon from DBWP, LLC. The acquisition closed on October 19, 2015. In acquiring Daytona Lagoon, the company pledged to invest more than $2 million over two years to upgrade the waterpark with an overall facelift, new attractions, a broader food selection, and improved amenities.

== Rides/Attractions ==
=== Water Rides ===
==== Blackbeard's Revenge ====
Blackbeard's Revenge is a dark-tunnel slide ride in an inflatable 3-person boat. This is a 1 to 3 person ride.

==== Poseidon's Pass ====
Poseidon's Pass is a slide ride much like Blackbeard's Revenge but has three tunnels: The Canyon, The Cave, and The Cavern. These rides require single or double tubes as a vehicle.

==== Adventure Mountain ====
Speed through 2 sloping slaloms and splash down into a cool pool of water. (Height requirement:42")

==== Pelican's Drift (Lazy River) ====
Much like a lazy river, this river goes around the Castaway Bay.

==== Castaway Bay ====
A large themed play structure with 4 slides for children. Water shooting nozzles, climbing nets and a bucket with the Daytona Lagoon logo that dumps 1,000 gallons of water every 2 minutes.

==== Treasure Lagoon wave pool ====
500,000 gallons of water that goes into a wave every couple of minutes.

==== Kraken's Conquest ====
A new ProRacer series speed slide where you can get on a slippery mat and race on one of four lanes of the 55-foot (17 m) tower to the bottom. [Height requirement: 42 inches (1,100 mm)]

=== Dry Attractions ===
==== Grand Prix Go-Kart Raceway ====
Daytona Lagoon has one multi-level go-kart track. The track has a unique design with it starting on the second floor of the facility overlooking the park's two 9-hole miniature golf courses. Go-kart drivers must be 56 inches (1,400 mm) tall. Double-seat drivers must have a valid driver's license (non-restricted) to drive a double-seater. Double-seat passengers must be at least 36 inches (910 mm) tall to ride.

==== 18 Holes of Mini-Golf ====
Two 9-hole miniature golf courses intertwine with the Grand Prix Go-Kart Raceway and the waterpark. This park once had three 9-hole miniature golf courses but one was removed in early 2010 to make space for an arcade expansion that included more arcade games and indoor bowling lanes.

==== Lazer Runner Lazer Tag ====
See lazer tag.

==== Rock Wall ====
A 25-foot-tall (7.6 m) rock wall with timer.

==== Arcade ====
The park has a large arcade that houses over 130 arcade games, prize vending games, ticket redemption games, the Rock Wall and entrance to Laser Tag.

== Gallery ==
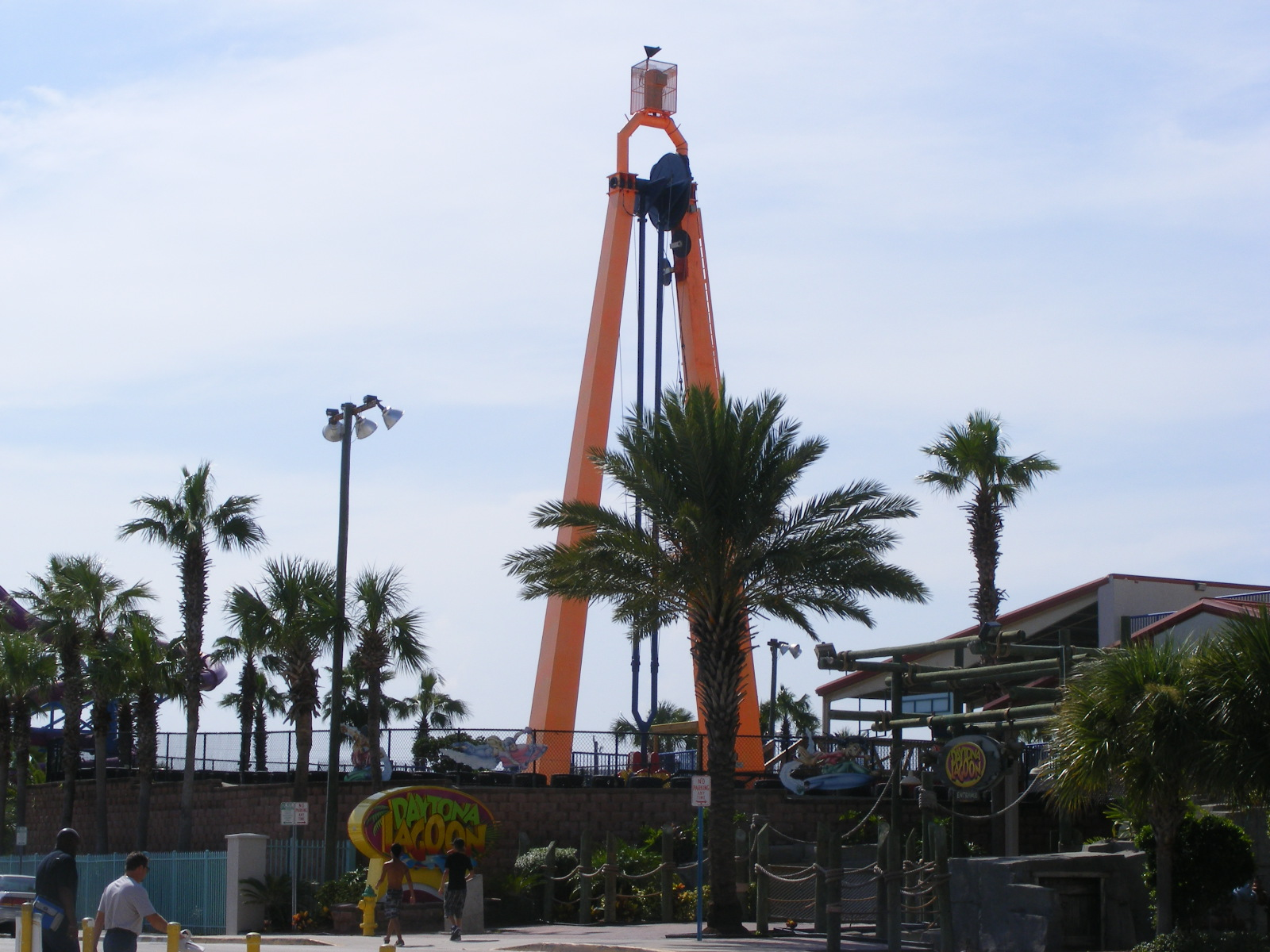
Main Entrance to Daytona Lagoon as viewed from the Ocean Center

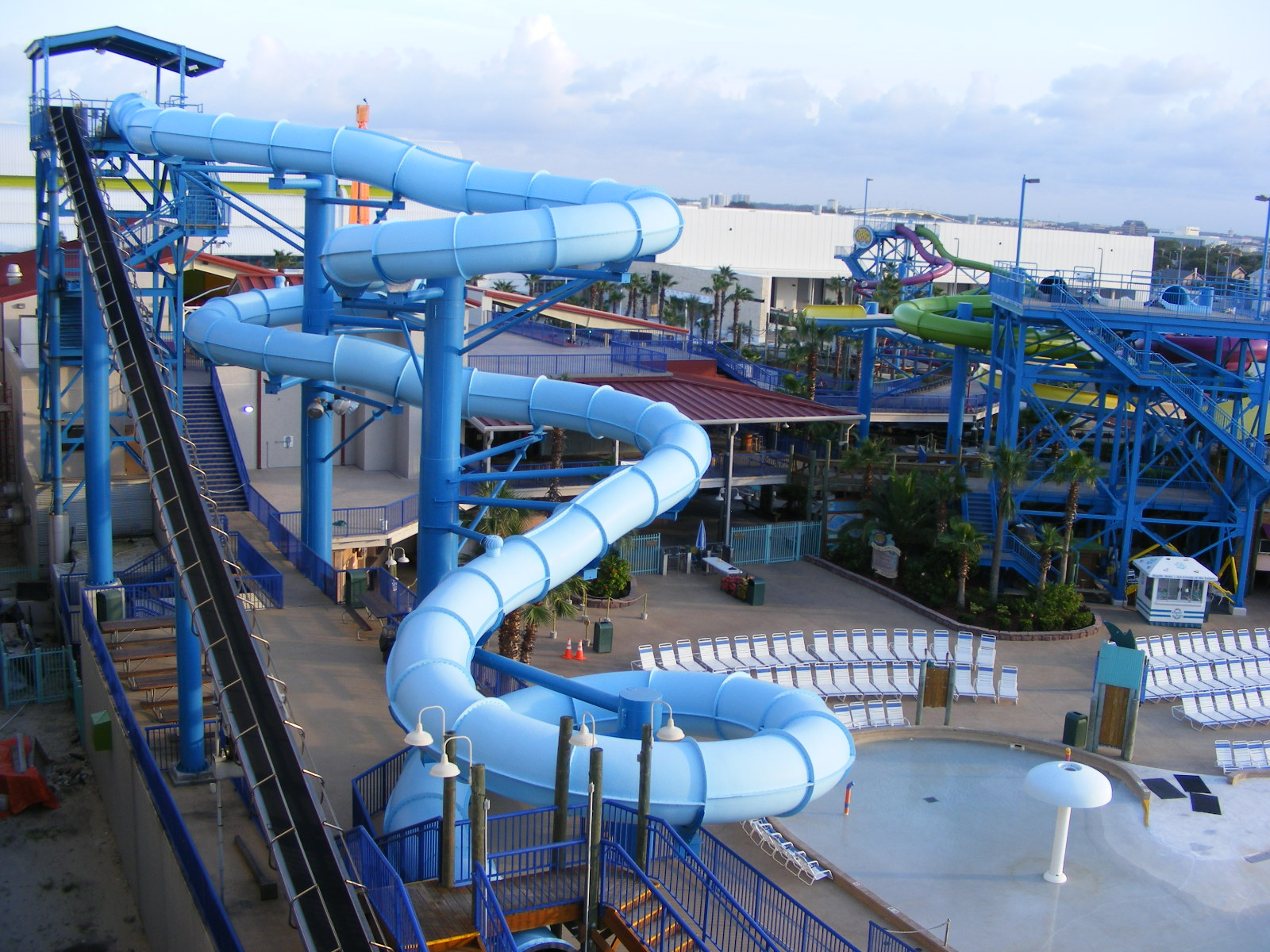
View from Southeast corner of waterpark showing Blackbeard's Revenge (closer), 3-slide Poseidon's Pass complex (center) and Adventure Mountain (distant)

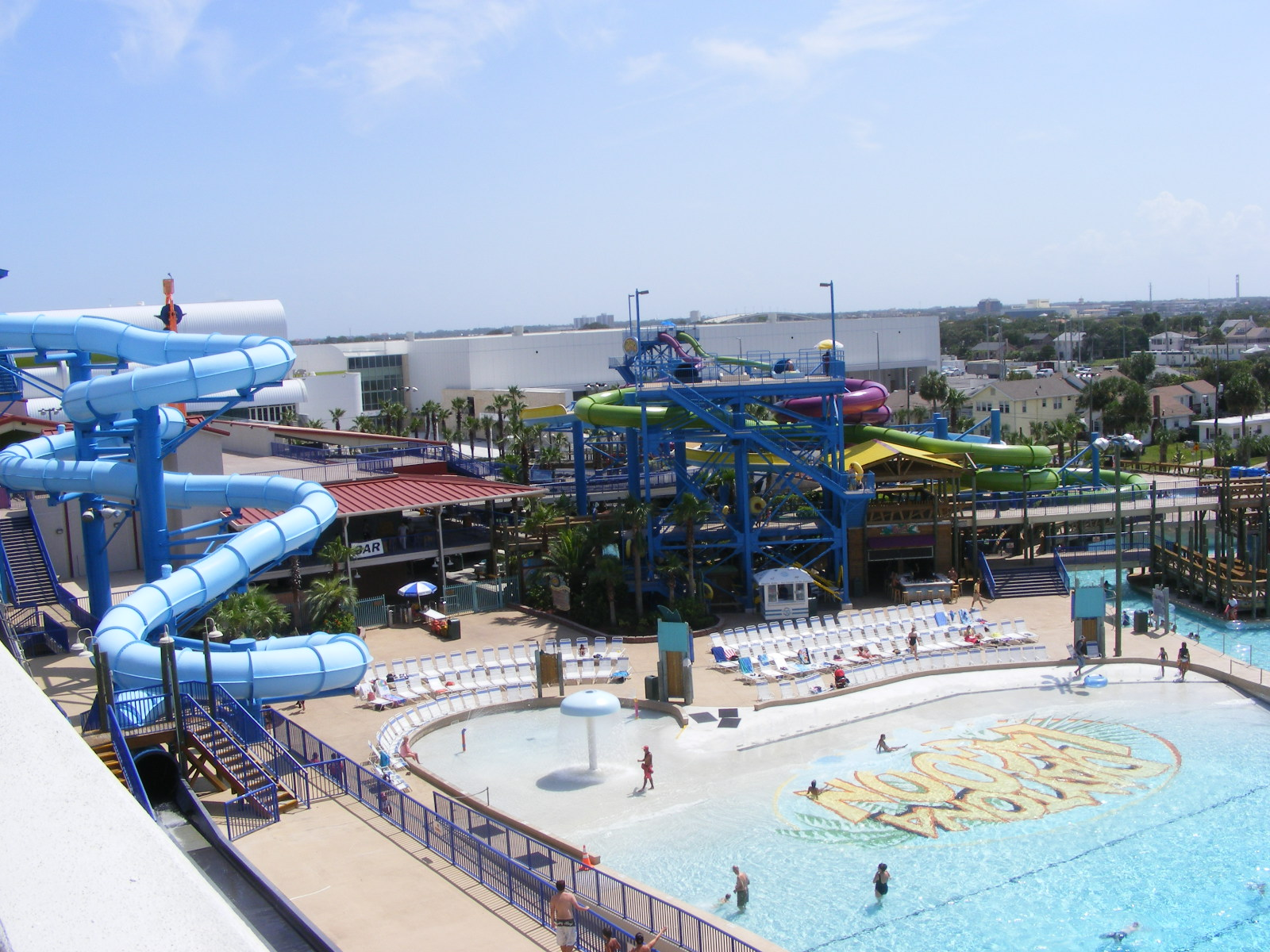
Second view from Southeast corner of waterpark showing Blackbeard's Revenge (closer), 3-slide Poseidon's Pass complex (center) and Adventure Mountain (distant)

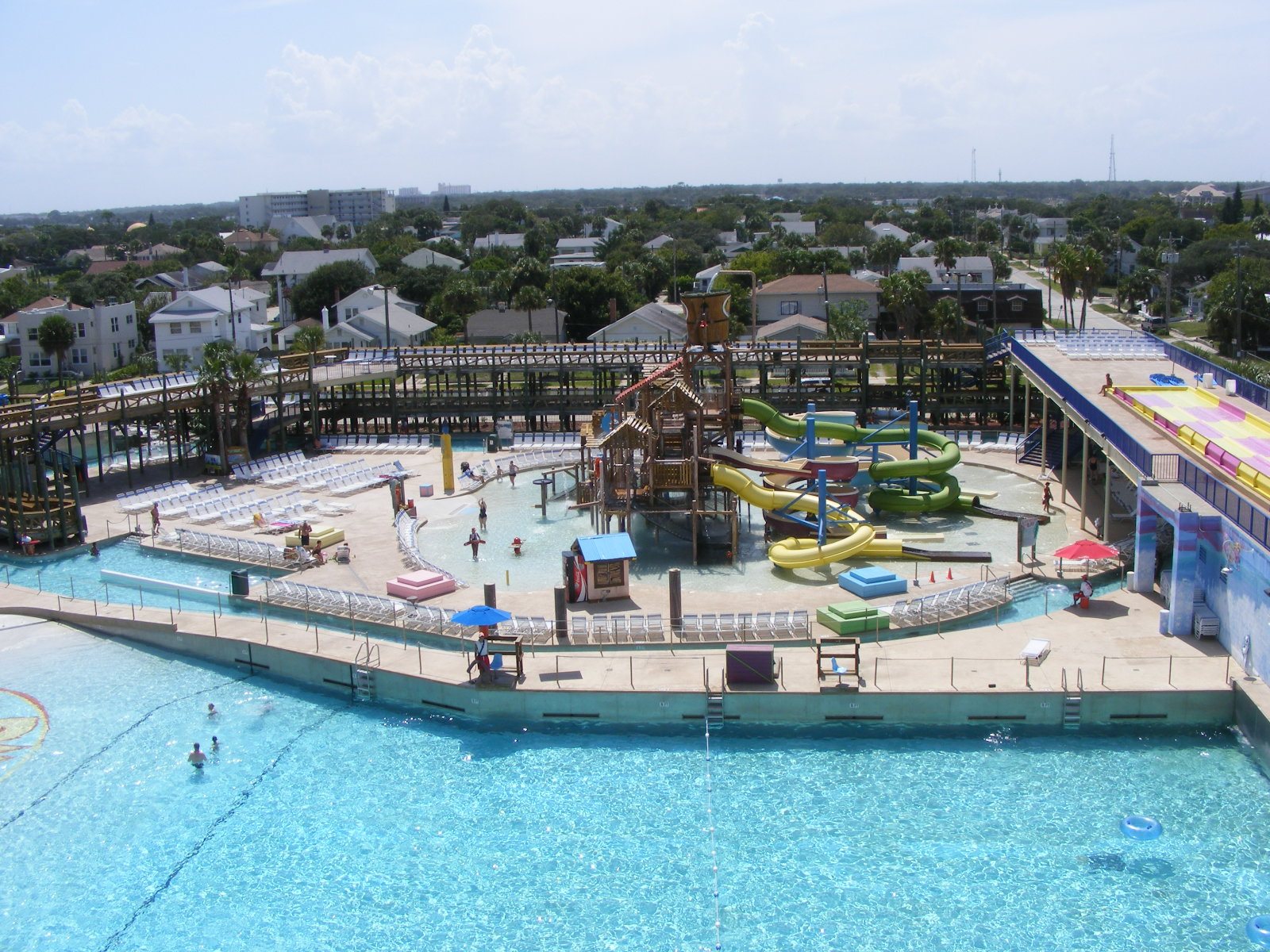
View of wavepool, Castaway Bay kids complex, Pelican's Drift (around Pelican's Drift) and Kraken's Conquest (runout only on right side)
