= Splashdown Vernon =

Water park in British Columbia, Canada

- Interactive map of Splashdown Vernon
- Location: Vernon, British Columbia
- Coordinates: 50°20′3.51″N 119°14′26.98″W
- Previous names: Atlantis Waterslides (1984–2020)
- Pools: 3 pools
- Water slides: 13 water slides
- Website: www.splashdown.ca

Splashdown Vernon, formerly Atlantis Waterslides is a water park located in Vernon, British Columbia, a district in the Okanagan region. It has 13 slides, as well as further services. The destination's waterslide, River Riot, has been noted for its popularity. It was voted the "Best Family Fun" attraction in the Okanagan region In the year 2012.

Students from schools within School District 22 Vernon and School District 23 Central Okanagan attend field trips at this destination. Atlantis Waterslides is located at 7921 Greenhow Road in the Regional District of North Okanagan. The Weather Network classifies Splashdown Vernon as an attraction.

Atlantis waterslides was opened in 1984.

In 2019 Atlantis waterslides was bought by Chris Steunenberg (Who also owns the Cultus Lake Waterpark) and was renamed to Splashdown Vernon.

== See also ==
- List of water parks
