= Cuel =

Mapuche-built tumulus

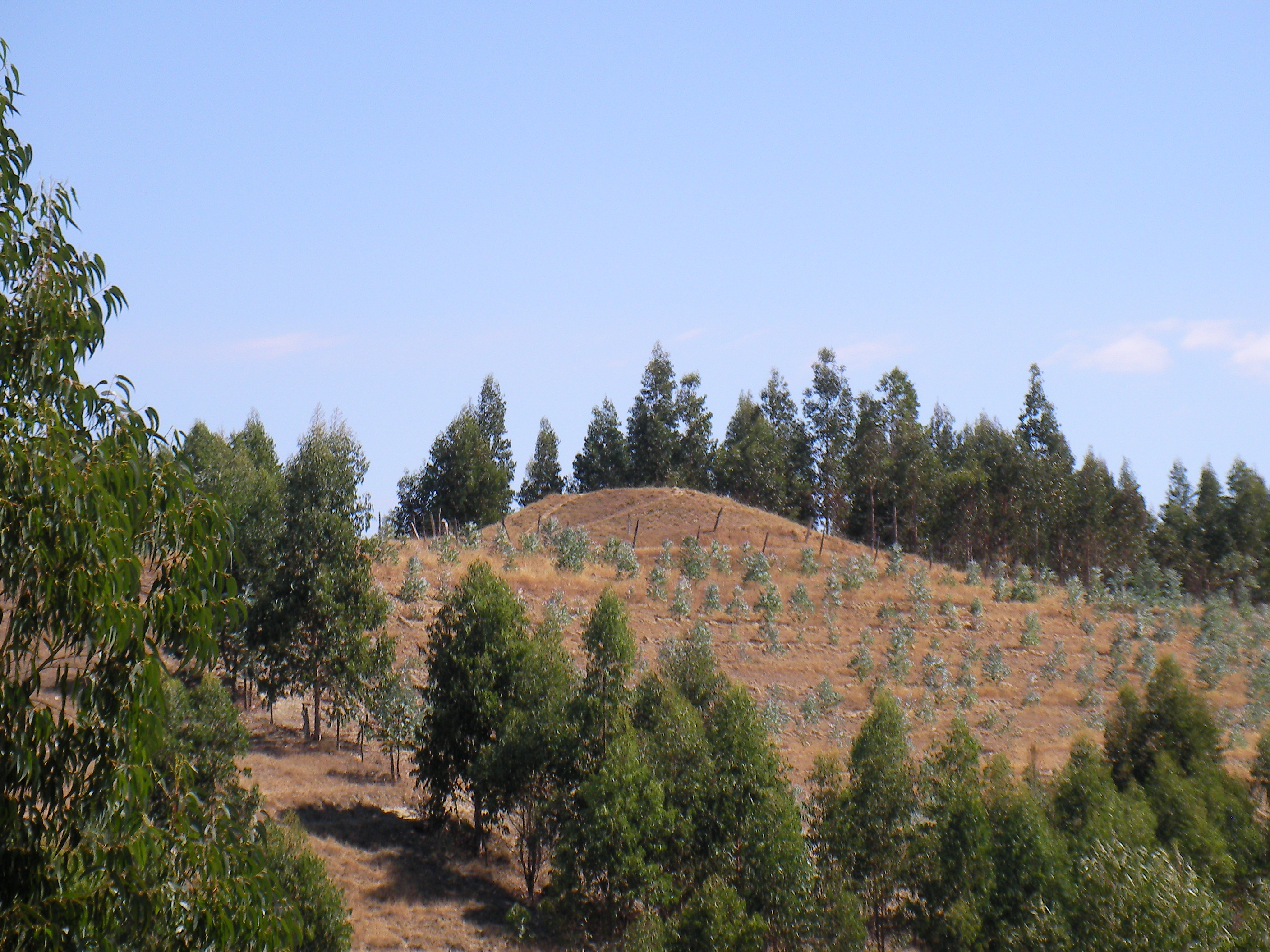
A cuel in the valley of Purén amidst an Eucalyptus plantation (38°4′34.80″S 72°53′13″W).

The cuel are Mapuche-built tumulus. The best known cuels are near the localities of Purén and Lumaco in Araucanía, south-central Chile. The first significant studies of the cuel were published by Tom Dillehay and José Saavedra in 2003 and 2007. The word cuel is a neologism formed from the mapudungun word kuel, meaning boundary marker (Spanish: lindero) according to the 18th-century dictionary of Andrés Febrés.
