= Arkadelphia Aquatic Park =

Water park in Arkadelphia, Arkansas

- Slogan: Arkadelphia's Best Place for Fun in the Sun
- Location: Arkadelphia, Arkansas, United States
- Coordinates: 34.126389°N 93.079315°W
- Operating season: May through September
- Water slides: 3 water slides
- Website: Official Site

Arkadelphia Aquatic Park is a water park located in Arkadelphia, Arkansas. During the 2006 season, nearly 25,000 individuals visited the park. This was up over 20% from 2005. Roughly 40% of the visitors are from out of town.

== Location ==
The Aquatic Park is located in Feaster Park at 2575 Twin Rivers Drive.

== Honors and awards ==
The Park was given the 2004 top facility award by the Arkansas Recreation and Parks Association.

== Attractions and features ==
- 8-lane, 25-meter swimming area
- Diving area within 8-lane area
- 1-meter springboard
- Drop Waterslide
- Open-flume Water slide
- Plunge area for slides outside of lane area
- Umbrella style water fountain
- Shaded bench area in zero depth entry
- Kids' frog slide
- 3 floating play pieces
- Four arching sprays
- Zero depth entry
- Grassy areas for sunbathing
- Concessions
- Shaded picnic areas
- Free use of Lounge chairs
- Lifeguards on duty
- Music while you swim
