= Waterworks (disambiguation) =

Waterworks is the provision of water supply by public utilities, commercial organisations, community endeavours, or individuals.

Waterworks may also refer to:

== Culture and entertainment ==
- Waterworks (card game)
- Waterworks (Hollis), a sculpture by Douglas Hollis in Cal Anderson Park, Seattle, Washington, U.S.
- Waterworks!, a video game
- The Waterworks, a 1994 novel by E. L. Doctorow
- "Waterworks" (Better Call Saul), an episode of Better Call Saul

== Places ==
- Water Works, Pennsylvania, commonly known as Water Works, Lebanon County, Pennsylvania, United States
- Water Works, Belfast, Northern Ireland, United Kingdom
- Milngavie water treatment works, Glasgow, Scotland
- WaterWorks (disambiguation), the former name of several water parks
- Waterworks, Isle of Man, a point on a motorcycle road-racing course used for TT and Manx Grand Prix races
- Waterworks Museum (Cape Town), South Africa
- Waterworks River, London, England, United Kingdom
- Waterworks Road, Brisbane, Queensland, Australia
- Waterworks Shopping Plaza, Pittsburgh, Pennsylvania, United States
- Decatur Waterworks, Decatur, Georgia, United States

== Other uses ==
- Erie Water Works, a water supply company for Erie, Pennsylvania, U.S.
- an informal name for the genitourinary system (especially in Britain)

== See also ==
- Mizu shōbai, a euphemism for the night-time entertainment business in Japan, typically translated as "water trade"
