= H2Oasis Indoor Waterpark =

Indoor water park in Anchorage, Alaska

H_{2}Oasis Indoor Waterpark
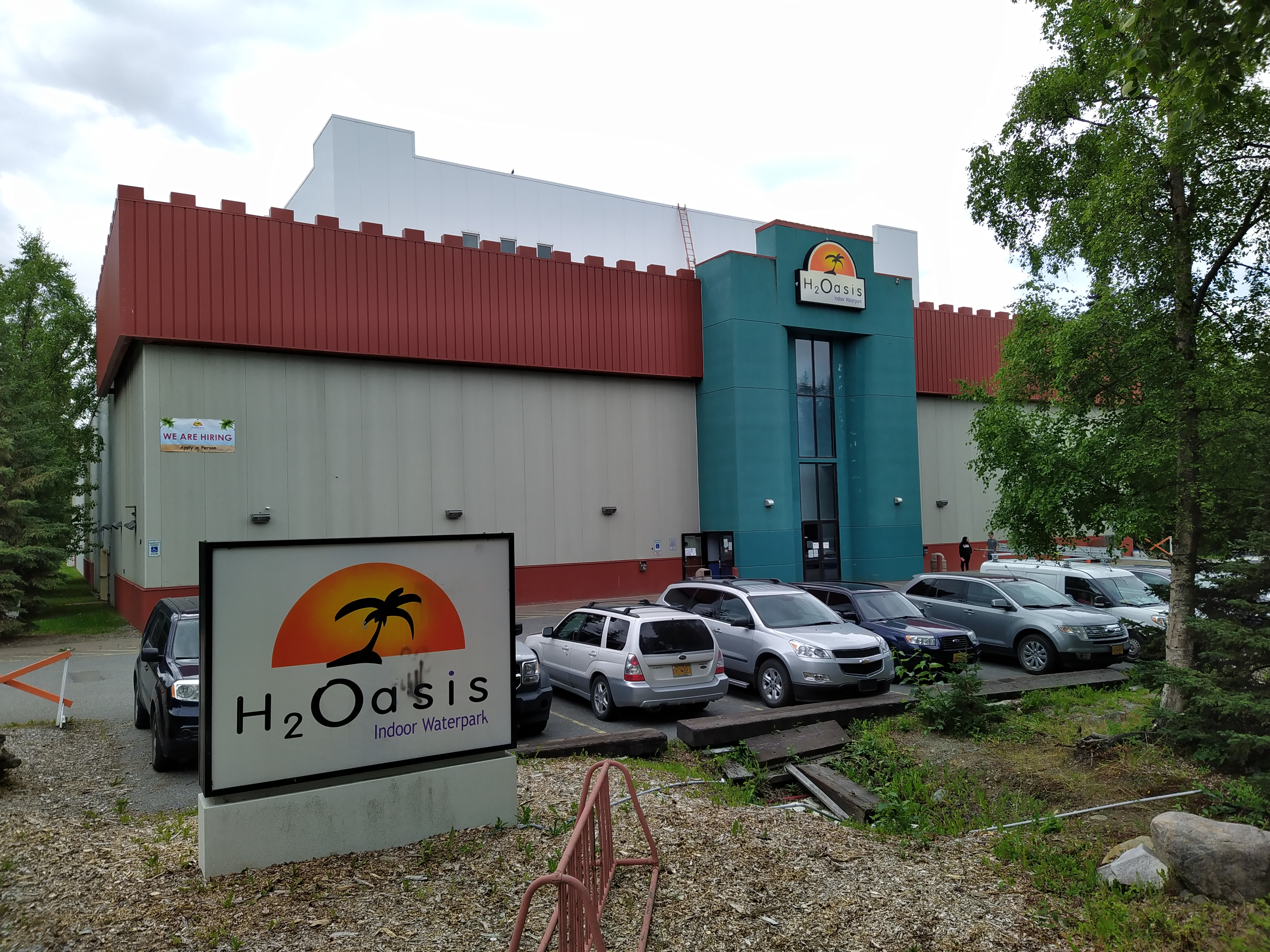
- Interactive map of H_{2}Oasis Indoor Waterpark
- Location: 1520 O'Malley Rd, Anchorage, AK 99507 Anchorage, Alaska, U.S.
- Coordinates: 61.121248°N 149.853890°W
- Opened: 2003; 23 years ago
- Slogan: A Tropical Island in the Last Frontier
- Operating season: All year
- Website: https://www.h2oasiswaterpark.com

H_{2}Oasis Indoor Waterpark is a 56,000 square foot (5,200 m^{2}) indoor water park located in Anchorage, Alaska, United States, just east of the Seward Highway at 1520 O'Malley Road. It opened in 2003 and was, at the time, the fifth largest indoor waterpark in the United States.

== Rides and water features ==
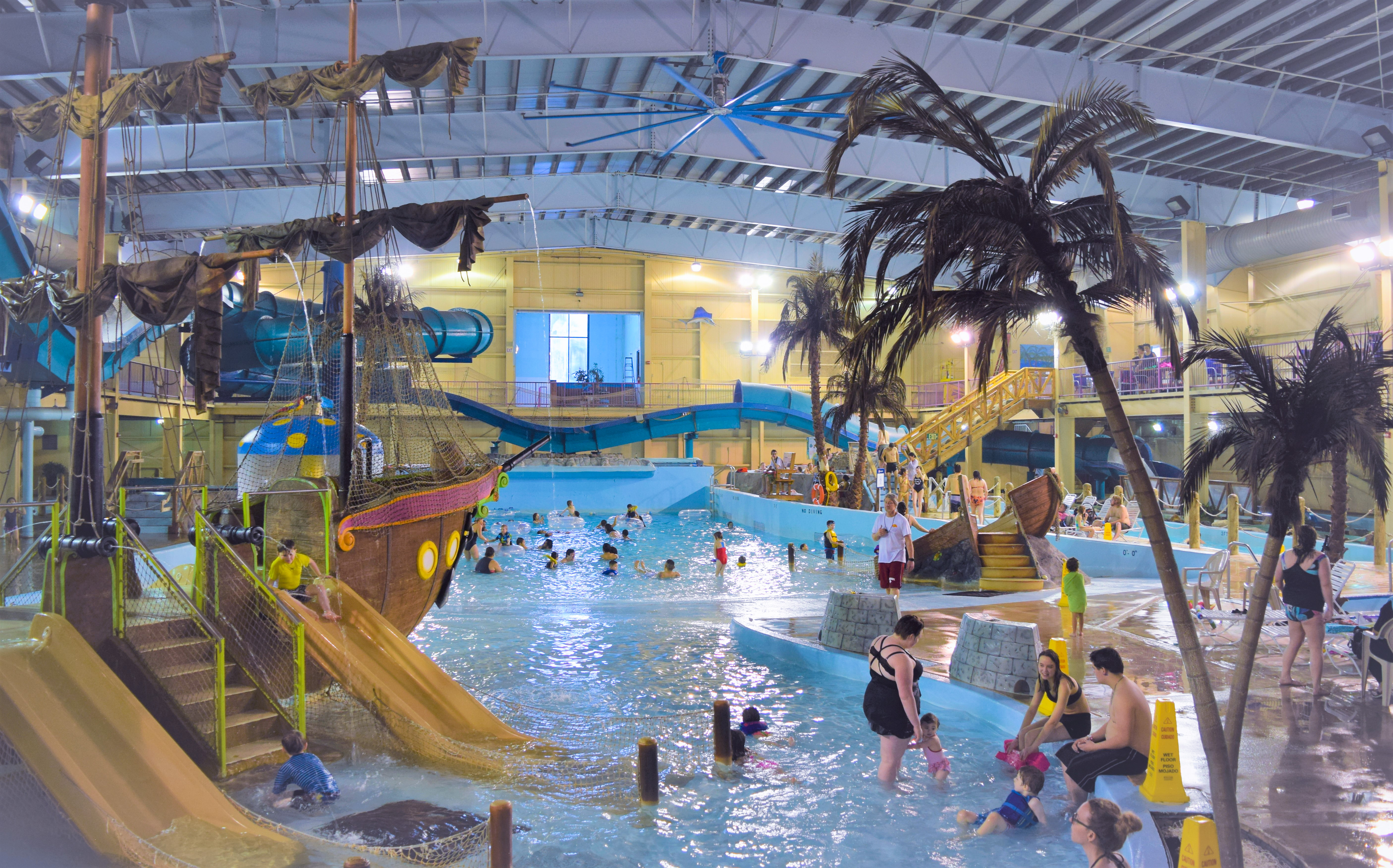
Interior of the water park

- The Master Blaster: a 43ft high and 505ft long water-powered rollercoaster (watercoaster)
- Open-flume body slide (orange), 43ft high
- Enclosed body slide (green)
- Wave pool, generating 3–4 foot waves
- Lazy River, encircling the park
- Pirate Ship Kiddie Pool, with seven slides and four water cannons
- Mushroom Water Drop and Beached Boat
- Alaska Hot Tub

The water temperature is kept around 84 °F (27 °C).
