= Rigby's Water World =

Amusement park in Georgia, U.S.

Rigby's Water World is a privately owned water park in the southern part of Warner Robins, Georgia. It opened in 2018 with 17 slides, and covers 23 acres (9.3 ha) with an additional 90 acres (36 ha) available for expansion.

== Development ==
During its planning, the park claimed it would become "the largest water park in the world." The facility has 17 water slides and walkways with more than 40 water-play implements. Other attractions include an adult pool with a three-tier waterfall, planned as of 2020.

Rigby's Water World is one of the largest water parks in the state of Georgia. The Lazy River, one of the leading attractions, is 1,600-foot (490 m) long, 15-foot (4.6 m) wide, and holds almost 1,000,000 US gallons (3,800 m^{3}) of water. Rigby's Water World was opened on July 7, 2018. It featured a 750-US-gallon (2.8 m^{3}) water bucket, 17 slides, and water gadgets for kids. The water park, owned by Steve Rigby, was announced to be a $15 million development project.

== Notable events ==
=== Temporary closure in August 2018 ===
In August 2018, the park was forced to shut down temporarily due to reports of a child testing positive for cryptosporidium, a parasite than can cause diarrhea. The health department was notified and a state health agency began an investigation. A few days later, the park owner stated that the park was safe and free of waterborne disease.

=== Route 96 Music Festival and Christmas Parade ===
The park hosted the rock and country music festival in September 2019. It was the endpoint for the 62nd Annual Warner Robins Christmas Parade in December 2019.

=== COVID-19 impact in summer 2020 ===
After postponing its 2020 summer season opening due to the COVID-19 pandemic, Rigby's Water World opened its summer season in June 2020.
