= Adventure Landing =

Group of amusement parks in the United States

- Adventure Landing - Come play with us!
- Industry: Amusement
- Founded: 1995; 31 years ago
- Founder: Hank Woodburn
- Fate: Bankruptcy; slow wind-down of operations
- Headquarters: Jacksonville Beach, Florida
- Number of locations: 6
- Key people: Hank Woodburn (founder & president)
- Parent: Adventure Entertainment Company (1995-2002); Adventure Landing LLC (2002-2004); Adventure Holdings, LLC (2004-present)
- Website: adventurelanding.com

Adventure Landing is a group of amusement parks located in Florida, New York, North Carolina and Texas. The first park was opened in Jacksonville Beach, Florida in 1995 & other Adventure Landing parks opened up in later years. Adventure Landing also manages and operates several other family entertainment centers throughout the United States. Adventure Landing currently runs 6 amusement parks nationwide.

== History ==
Prior to Adventure Landing's founding; founder Hank Woodburn spent 24 years working with the Putt-Putt Golf Courses of America, specializing in updating the locations, to include new features that Putt-Putt introduced.

In 1994, Woodburn updated the Jacksonville, Fl Putt-Putt (Blanding & Beach Blvd) locations to include go-karts, batting cages, and arcades.

That same year, Woodburn, alongside Chip Linville, acquired 18 acres of land on Beach Blvd in Jacksonville Beach to open up a new arcade & water park independently from Putt-Putt known as Adventure Landing. The dry portion opened on May 26, 1995, followed by Shipwreck Island waterpark in mid-June by Woodburn's company Adventure Golf & Games (which later became Adventure Entertainment Company).

The initial cost of construction for the first location was $5 million. The central structure contained the video arcade, laser tag, snackbar, prize counter, restrooms and other attractions. It was surrounded by miniature golf, batting cages, go-kart track and the water park.

In 1997, two Putt-Putt locations (Jacksonville Blanding and Raleigh) owned by Adventure Entertainment were converted to Adventure Landing, followed by the Greece location the next year.

In 1998, Adventure Entertainment was sold to a former New York investment banker Randy Levinson; at that time, the company had 5 branded Adventure Landing locations and several Putt-Putt franchised locations (including Buffalo, Greensboro, and Newport News). Later that same year, Bob Steele of PepsiCo became CEO of the company, later resigning the next year. The 6th location & 2nd water park of Adventure Landing opened up in Daytona Beach (now Daytona Lagoon) on October 10, 1998.

On December 18, 2002, a management-led buyout was completed by Adventure Landing LLC for the four profitable parks owned by Adventure Entertainment.

In 2004, Hank Woodburn bought back Adventure Landing from management via Adventure Holdings, LLC.

In 2010, Adventure Holdings acquired All Star Adventures & All Star Sports in Wichita from Zuma Holdings, LLC.

The five Adventure Landing locations owned by Adventure Holdings, LLC were purchased in April 2011 by National Retail Properties (NRP), a Real Estate Investment Trust based in Orlando, Florida. All the locations were sale-leaseback transactions, so Adventure Holdings continued to operate the facilities.

In 2012, Adventure Landing purchased The Beach Waterpark in Mason, OH, which reopened in May 2013 as The Beach at Adventure Landing.

=== Demise ===
In December 2019, following a disastrous 2018 season and debt accumulation, Adventure Holdings & NRP Lease Holdings filed for Chapter 11 bankruptcy protection.

In March 2020, due to the COVID-19 pandemic, the locations were closed for a few months, although have later reopened with safety precautions (such as sanitization of high touch points & six feet marks).

The Blanding Boulevard location in Jacksonville was closed in Summer of 2021 after 24 years in operation. The property was purchased to build a parking lot for Amazon's new delivery center.

The Adventure Landing in Jacksonville Beach was sold in 2021 and a 427-unit apartment complex was planned for the site. The parks were slated to close Halloween 2021, but construction was first delayed until end-of-year 2021, then the date was pushed back until August 31, 2022, and ultimately October 15, 2025. Adventure Landing announced that they were searching Jacksonville for a location to rebuild a new, larger facility.

On April 12, 2026, the last Florida Adventure Landing location in St. Augustine (which opened in 1999 as Family Fun Factory and later bought out in 2008), closed permanently; two months prior, the land was officially sold to M&D Property Ventures LLC for $3.6 million, with intentions to redevelop the area. On August 16th, 2026, the Raleigh location closed permanently after 38 years of operation; the land was already sold for $3 million by NRP to an LLC linked to Cook Out's CEO Jeremy Reeves back in July 2021.

In September 2026, All Star Sports in Wichita (Note: Sister location All Star Adventures already closed permanently back in December 2024 after the site was sold to Equisset, LLC months prior; that site is now Mammoth Clubhouse.) and Cool Crest Family Fun Center in Independence both closed amid complaints of employees of the respective locations not being paid for months.

== Operation ==
There is no admission for the amusement parks; all the attractions are pay as you play. The water park at the now closed first location was seasonal and required a fee for admission. Not all features are at all parks. All parks included miniature golf and an arcade. Aside from the park in Buffalo, New York, all locations had go-karts, laser tag, and batting cages. Some parks had unique attractions, such as the Wacky Worm Rollercoaster at the former Jacksonville Beach location. Special accommodations are available for large group events.

=== Amusement Park Features ===
- Adventure Speedway Go-Karts: a quarter mile track with racing results posted on a finish-line leader board.
- Batting Cages: Participants specify hardball, softball, slow pitch or fast pitch with speeds ranging up to 70 mph.
- Bumper Boats: Electric powered boats that functioned just like bumper cars, but on a pond. Each boat had a built-in squirt gun. Dallas & Winston-Salem locations have them currently, while the former Jacksonville Beach location removed it in the early 2000s.
- Laser Tag: The course varies by location. The game, known as Pirate's Quest in the former Raleigh & Blanding locations, and Area 51 in the former Jacksonville Beach location, was played in twilight with lightning flashes and the sound of weapon fire. Scoring was automatic and participants were given a printout of their results. The Dallas location is the last location with laser tag.
- Miniature Golf: Two 18-hole miniature golf courses designed to be fun, regardless of skill level.
- Teddy Bear Factory: a stuffed animal could be created interactively.
- Video Arcade: All locations had this feature, with up to 100 machines. All games used tokens and many games dispensed tickets which could be redeemed for prizes. (Note: Dallas & Raleigh (now closed) locations switched to game cards & e-tickets in June 2022)
- Snack Bar: Pizza, drinks and snack food.

=== Formerly available ===
- Frog Hopper: A safe, bouncing ride designed for young children.
- Max Flight: A roller coaster simulator with 360° range of motion. The Jacksonville Beach location had it until closure in 2025, while the St Augustine location had it until 2020.
- Sweet Adventures: an old-fashioned candy shop.
- Wacky Worm Roller Coaster: The ride was intended for youngsters or small children and their parents.
- Wow Factory: A 3-story interactive playland and slide, containing 9,000 foam balls to climb in. Cannons & geysers kept the balls moving.

== Shipwreck Island ==
Shipwreck Island was the waterpark co-located at Adventure Landing in Jacksonville Beach, Florida. It was constructed in 1995 but opened a month after the dry park side.

=== Water Park Features ===
- Typhoon Lagoon: a 500,000 gallon wave pool with 3-4' waves.
- Lil’ St. John’s River: a 720' lazy river.
- Hydro Halfpipe: a water version of skateboarding half-pipe.
- Eye of the Storm: a 40' diameter bowl that flows like a whirlpool.
- Splash Cove: a toddler play area.
- Rage: an uphill water coaster with speeds up to 18 mph.
- Undertow: a 400' double-raft flume ride with speeds up to 23 mph.
- Cabana rentals.
- Pirate Play: a 62' pirate ship with water cannons, slides & waterfalls.

== Jacksonville Beach Location ==
Adventure Landing Jacksonville Beach
- Interactive map of Adventure Landing Jacksonville Beach
- Location: 1944 Beach Blvd., Jacksonville Beach, Florida
- Coordinates: 30.286955°N 81.412369°W
- Opened: May 26, 1995
- Closed: October 15, 2025
- Slogan: Adventure Landing - Come play with us!
- Operating season: Year round
- Area: 4 acres (16,000 m^{2})

Attractions
- Total: 15
- Website: Adventure Landing Jacksonville Beach website

In June 2021, it was announced that the Jacksonville Beach site would close in October 2021 due to the lease owner's decision to construct an apartment building and parking lot. In October 2022, as the park continued to operate through the past year, it was announced that Adventure Landing in Jacksonville Beach, Florida, will stay open until the end of September 2023 after a new agreement with their landlord. Adventure Landing does not plan on ending their stay in Jacksonville Beach once their landlord closes their park, but instead they are exploring other areas of Jacksonville to rebuild another water park.

In October 2025, Adventure Landing announced that their Jacksonville Beach location was closing immediately after 30 years in operation. Any customers holding Jax Beach gift certificates, tokens or arcade tickets requiring redemption may utilize the St. Augustine location which remained open until April 12, 2026. An application was pending with the St. Johns River Water Management District to redevelop the site.

== Adventure Landing Locations ==
- New York: Buffalo/Tonawanda
- North Carolina: Winston-Salem, Gastonia
- Texas: Dallas

== Other Locations ==
- Missouri: Cool Crest Family Fun Center located in Independence
- Kansas: All Star Sports Entertainment located in Wichita

== Former Locations ==
- Florida: Jacksonville Beach, Jacksonville (Blanding Boulevard), Daytona Beach (location closed in 2002; now Daytona Lagoon), St. Augustine (previously Family Fun Factory)
- Kansas: All Star Adventures located in Wichita.
- North Carolina: Charlotte (previously Zuma Fun Center & Celebration Station; sold and rebranded to Funtasticks in 2018, and closed in 2020), Raleigh (Closed on August 16, 2026)
- New York: Greece, Wheatfield (Adventure Speedway (formerly The Track))
- Ohio: The Beach at Adventure Landing located in Mason Magic Mountain Fun Center located in Lyra Dr, Columbus, Magic Mountain Fun Center East located in Scarborough Blvd, Columbus
- Texas: Amazing Jake's Food & Fun located in Plano
