= Hellie's Tepee Pool =

Hot springs facility in Thermopolis, Wyoming

Hellie's TePee Pools and Spa
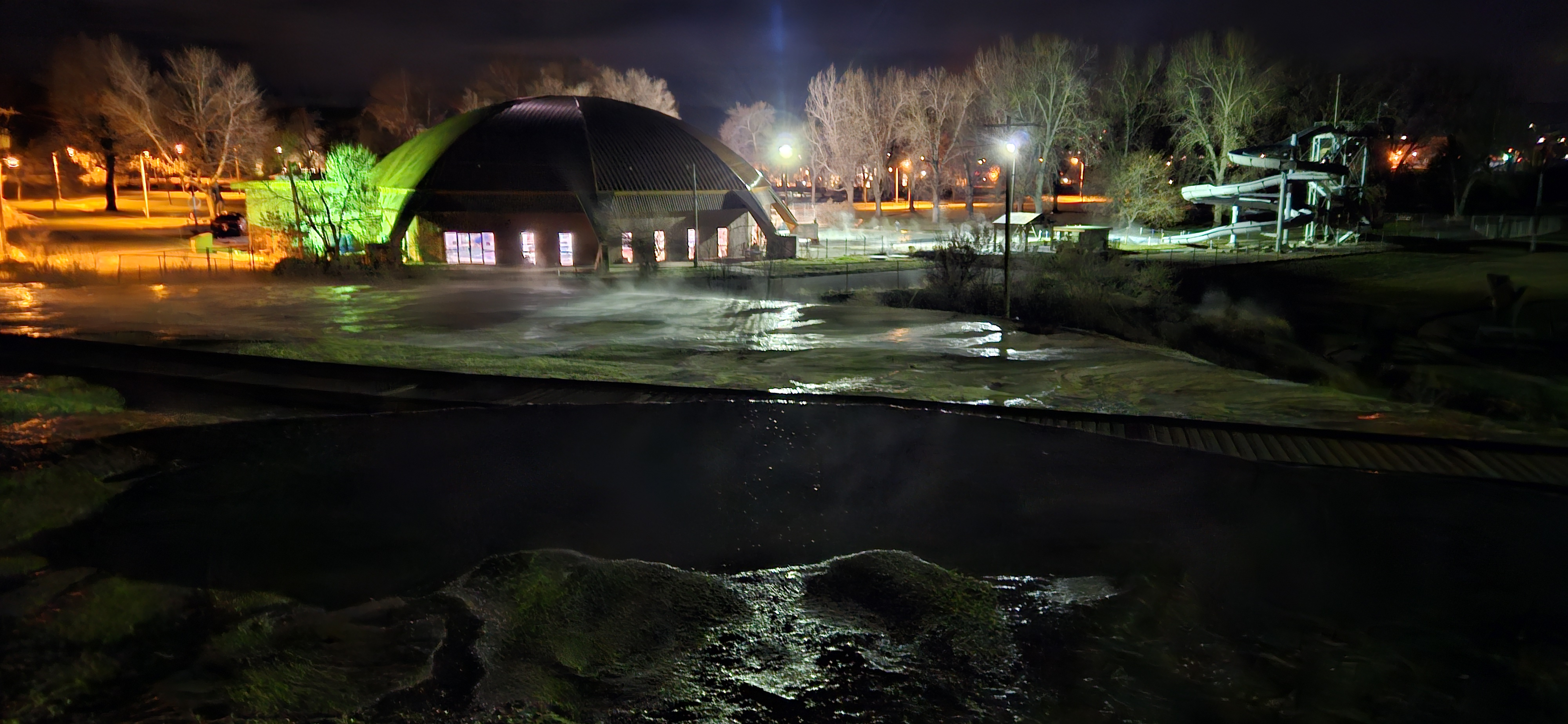
- Hellie's TePee Pool at night looking southwest from the hot springs
- Interactive map of Hellie's TePee Pools and Spa
- Location: Hot Springs State Park in Thermopolis, Wyoming, United States
- Coordinates: 43.6524°N 108.1978°W
- Owner: Wyoming Hot Springs LLC (owned by former U.S. senator Mark Begich)
- Type: Hot springs and aquatic facility

Construction
- Opened: 1967

Hellie's TePee Pools and Spa is a commercial aquatic facility located within Hot Springs State Park in Thermopolis, Wyoming. The facility is distinguished by its unique architecture, featuring a teepee-shaped dome, and its use of naturally heated mineral water sourced from the "Big Horn" spring. It is located adjacent to the Big Horn River. Hellie's TePee Pools and Spa first opened in 1967.

== History ==
The history of commercial bathing at the site is rooted in the early 20th-century development of Thermopolis as a destination for health tourism. The facility diverted mineral water from the local hot springs, which emerges from the ground at a source temperature of 131 °F (55 °C).

== Fire Incidents ==
Commercial bathhouses in the park's early history faced significant risks from fire due to the prevalence of wooden infrastructure and high mineral deposits in heating systems. A significant fire occurred at the facility in the 1970s, causing extensive damage to the original superstructure. The fire destroyed the primary covering of the pool area, which at the time featured a different roofline. This event necessitated a complete reconstruction of the roof, leading to the installation of the current, iconic teepee-shaped dome. The decision to rebuild in the shape of a teepee was intended both as a functional architectural solution for high-moisture mineral environments and as a tribute to the Native American heritage associated with the springs. As of 2024, Hellie's is the only commercial hot springs facility fully operational within the park, following the temporary closure of the neighboring Star Plunge. The property features three natural hot spring pools, including a large indoor pool with a waterfall and slide, as well as outdoor soaking tubs with mountain views. In late 2023, the facility was acquired by Wyoming Hot Springs LLC, a company owned by former U.S. senator Mark Begich. Since taking over, management has implemented upgrades to maintenance, including improved locker room conditions and enhanced health protocols.

== Future Redevelopment ==
Wyoming State Parks selected Wyoming Hot Springs LLC to oversee a multi-million-dollar reconstruction of the grounds. The proposed plan intends to transform Hellie's TePee Pools into a modern "spa and wellness center." This project was designed to integrate with the 2016 Hot Springs State Park Master Plan, which aimed to revitalize the park's concessionaire areas while preserving geothermal resources.

== See also ==
Star Plunge is another water park nearby in Hot Springs State Park.
