= Splash Island =

Toronto Zoo educational water park

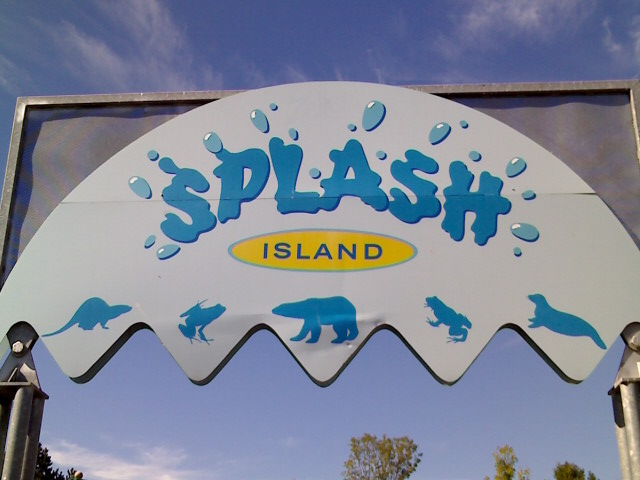
- Entrance to Splash Island
- Interactive map of Splash Island
- Location: Toronto, Ontario, Canada
- Opened: 2002

Splash Island is an educational water park located at the Toronto Zoo, in Toronto, Ontario, Canada. It uses interactive exhibits to teach about the water cycle (evaporation, condensation, etc.); aquatic animals; water flow in rivers, lakes, and oceans; and more.

Exhibits teach evaporation, and how nature facilitates evaporation within plant life; and the three states-of-matter (solid, liquid, and gas), using polar bears and ice to show water in its solid state.
