= Splash Universe =

Splash Universe is a subsidiary of Focus Hospitality Services, LLC, a developer, owner, and operator of hotels and resorts in the United States founded in 1984. Both Focus Hospitality and Splash Universe are headquartered in Sarasota, Florida. Focus developed the brand "Splash Universe Water Park Resorts" as a full-service, value-priced waterpark for families with children.

Each Splash Universe indoor waterpark resort is characterized by an individualized theme. The current waterpark in Dundee, Michigan follows an outdoors motif, while the former Shipshewana, Indiana waterpark was country-themed. Both Splash Universe resorts opened in the Winter of 2006.

On June 6, 2010, around 2:17am EST, an EF2 tornado struck the area of Dundee, MI, doing major damage to Cabela's, Splash Universe Waterpark, and restaurants in the area. There were no major injuries, but the waterpark and some nearby businesses had to close for several months to repair major damages from the tornado.

The resort in Indiana closed in 2013.
