= Star Plunge =

Water park in Wyoming, United States

Coordinates: 43.6519°N 108.1956°W

Star Plunge is a historic commercial aquatic facility and water park located within Hot Springs State Park in Thermopolis, Wyoming. Established in the late 19th century, it is one of the oldest thermal bathing facilities in the United States and has served as a central tourism anchor for Hot Springs County for over a century. The facility is known for utilizing natural mineral water from the park's "Big Spring" in its pools and slides.

== History ==
The original Star Plunge was established as a canvas-covered pool in 1900, following the 1897 founding of the state park. The structure transitioned from wood to more permanent materials throughout the early 20th century as visitor demand increased. In 1975, the facility was purchased by Wolfgang and Christine Luehne, who operated it under a 50-year lease agreement with the State of Wyoming. Under the Luehne family's management, the property was expanded into a modern water park, adding slides and fitness amenities while maintaining the historic "Vapor Cave," a natural steam room carved into the mountain.

The facility features several pools maintained at temperatures ranging from 90 to 104 degrees Fahrenheit (32-40 degrees Celsius), heated by 27 different minerals found in the park's water. It is particularly noted for its significant water slides, including the "Super Star 500", an outdoor flume slide measuring 500 feet in length, built into the natural hillside of the park. The most well-known water slide is known as the "Blue Thunder Run", a 330-foot-long hydro-tube that curves around a 60-foot tower and terminates in the indoor pool. Finally, the "Lil' Dipper" is a 60-foot-long slide designed for younger children.

=== Closure ===
In early 2024, the Wyoming State Parks department opened a bidding process for a new concessionaire to manage the facility, eventually selecting Wyoming Hot Springs LLC (the owners of the neighboring TePee Pools). The Luehne family, which had operated the pool for nearly 50 years, contested the decision, alleging that the bidding process was unfair and that the state did not offer proper compensation for building improvements owned by the family.

The dispute led to a prolonged legal battle between the Luehnes and the State of Wyoming. Consequently, Star Plunge was ordered to close to the public on January 14, 2025, after a brief extension of its lease. The facility remains closed indefinitely as of late 2025, while the community continues to advocate for its reopening due to its impact on local tourism.

== See also ==
- Hellie's Tepee Pool - Another water park in Hot Springs State Park.
