= Ray's Splash Planet =

Water park in Charlotte, North Carolina

- Overflowing With Fun and Fitness
- Slogan: Recreate All Year!
- Location: Charlotte, North Carolina, United States
- Coordinates: 35°14′17.1″N 80°51′4.67″W
- Owner: Mecklenburg County
- Opened: October 15, 2002
- Operating season: All Year Long
- Water slides: 4 water slides
- Website: Official website

Ray's Splash Planet (often referred to as Ray's) is a Mecklenburg County, North Carolina funded water park located in Charlotte, North Carolina, United States. The aquatic facility is operated by the Mecklenburg County Park and Recreation department. Ray's Splash Planet is considered one of the largest indoor water parks in both of the Carolinas and is the largest water park in Charlotte, North Carolina, with over 29,000 square feet of space and using over 117,000 gallons of water at 87 degrees. The water is cleaned and sanitized through the use of chlorine, filtration and an ultraviolet germicidal irradiation system. There are multiple attractions including the Blue Comet, a three-story figure 8 slide, and other family friendly attractions like the Orbiter, Saturation Station, the Vortex, Meteor Showers, Moon Beach and the Sea of Tranquility. The water park also features a fitness center and gymnasium shared with the Irwin Academic Center, an educational center of the Charlotte-Mecklenburg Schools system. The first floor of the facility includes the pool area, locker rooms, birthday party classrooms and concessions stand. The second story includes the fitness center with an aerobics/dance studio. Access to the indoor gymnasium is also located on the second floor. Ray's Splash Planet is located on North Sycamore Street near Johnson & Wales University and is just off Interstate 77 in North Carolina in the Third Ward section of Uptown Charlotte. The water park opened on October 15, 2002 with help from Mecklenburg County Park and Recreation's partnership with Charlotte-Mecklenburg Schools. Major competitors are Carowinds in Charlotte, North Carolina, Great Wolf Lodge in Concord, North Carolina and Wet 'n Wild Emerald Pointe in Greensboro, North Carolina.

== History ==
In 1994, a plan was suggested to turn the Irwin Avenue Elementary School into a new recreation center. Extensive renovation of the gymnasium followed the approval of a 1995 park bond referendum, and the (basketball) gymnasium opened to the public in 1998 as the Irwin Avenue Recreation Center. The referendum also allowed for design for one of the first indoor water parks in the Southeast. Land for the water park was available on the Irwin Elementary campus, adjacent to a natural creek that is park of the Mecklenburg County greenway system and that connects surrounding neighborhoods. The architect firm Clark/Nexsen designed the water park facilities, emphasizing the movement of water and incorporating the nearby natural creek as its design. The $7.5 million project had its groundbreaking in March 2001. Physically attached to the Irwin Academic Center (previously known as Irwin Avenue Elementary) through the shared space of the gymnasium, Ray's Splash Planet opened on October 15, 2002. Since 2002, Ray's Splash Planet has won numerous awards and accolades for being a feature attraction for local residents from the Charlotte Observer newspaper, Creative Loafing and Charlotte Parent magazines.

== Rides and attractions ==
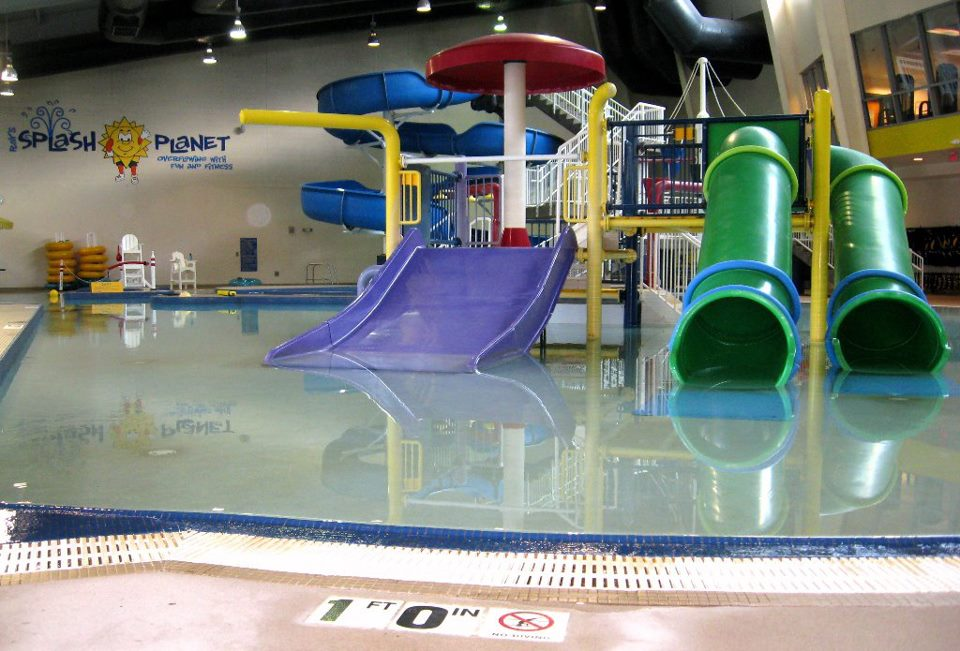
Ray's Splash Planet in Charlotte, NC

| Name | Description |
|---|---|
| The Blue Comet | 3 story slide shaped in the form of a double figure-8. (Must be 48" tall to ride) |
| The Orbiter | A small lazy river that circles around the Blue Comet. |
| Saturation Station | Features four slides, interactive water play and tumble buckets. |
| The Vortex | A quick current pool that pushes swimmers in a circle. |
| Moon Beach | A kiddie play area with gradual beach-like entry pool. |
| Sea of Tranquility | Two lap-lanes for lap swimming, water basketball and water volleyball. |

== See also ==
- List of waterparks
