= The Beach at Adventure Landing =

Water park in Mason, Ohio

- Slogan: Come to the Beach
- Location: Mason, Ohio, United States
- Coordinates: 39°21′42″N 84°15′43″W
- Owner: Adventure Holdings LLC
- General manager: Kevin Foiles
- Opened: 1985
- Closed: 2019
- Previous names: The Beach
- Operating season: May through September
- Status: Defunct[[]]
- Area: 35 acres (140,000 m^{2})
- Pools: 3 pools
- Water slides: 11 water slides
- Children's areas: 3 children's areas

The Beach at Adventure Landing was a 35-acre (140,000 m^{2}) water park located 24 miles (39 km) northeast of Cincinnati in Mason, Ohio. Previously known as The Beach Waterpark, it featured ten water attractions, several children's areas, sand volleyball and basketball courts, pool-side beverage service and other special events. The Beach was named the best privately owned water park by Aquatics International Magazine in 2010.

In March 2012, The Beach announced it would be closing its doors after operating at a loss for several years, citing a bad economy and poor attendance. In July 2012, Adventure Holdings LLC, based in Florida announced plans to lease and reopen the water park as The Beach at Adventure Landing. It reopened to the public on May 18, 2013.

The Beach closed for the second time at the end of the 2019 season, and the property was eventually sold in September 2022 to Lexington attorney & developer Patrick Madden, who decided to keep The Beach permanently closed.

== History ==
The Beach began development in December 1984, since its opening in 1985, The Beach remained a privately owned and operated facility by the Bunnel Hill Developmental Company. Although it does not always reveal exact numbers, The Beach averages 300,000 visitors per year. Since the early 2000s, The Beach would feature local DJs on Tuesday nights during the summer for their Club Aqua Splash teen night.

The Beach announced on March 9, 2012, that the park would not reopen for the 2012 season. Ralph Vilardo Jr., spokesperson for The Beach Waterpark, released a statement saying, “We have been proud to provide entertainment and employment to Southwest Ohioans for more than 27 years. Like many businesses these days, we had to make the difficult decision to close after concluding that further investment to support the business cannot be justified.” Those who had purchased 2012 season passes were offered discounts and passes to other local attractions, such as Kings Island and the Cincinnati Zoo. A lawsuit was filed by Ohio Attorney General Mike DeWine in response to hundreds of complaints that the proposed substitutions were inadequate.

Adventure Holdings LLC, parent company of the Adventure Landing amusement park chain based in Florida, announced plans to lease The Beach Waterpark and rename it to The Beach at Adventure Landing. On March 6, 2013, the park was officially sold to National Retail Properties LP, an affiliate of Adventure Holdings LLC, for $3 million. The company held a job fair later that month to hire 500 employees and invested $5 million in renovations to the park, which reopened to the public on May 18, 2013.

In Fall 2019, it was reported that The Beach was put up for sale via Anchor Associates, with the future of the water park unknown after the end of the 2019 season. Around December, Adventure Holdings filed for their own bankruptcy, making additional doubt of the Beach's future status.

In September 2022, the property was sold to Patrick Madden, a Lexington attorney & developer, who decided to keep the water park permanently closed.

== Attractions ==
The Beach features more than 50 rides and attractions including:

- Riptide Racer A heart pounding 4 lane racing slide using racing mats.
- Kamikaze A flume ride in the park that features a towering plunge of twists and turns including a 360-degree turn. The latest addition to the park.
- The Cliff The tallest body slide in the park, with a small tunnel at the bottom before the splash pool.
- Banzai Blast Two side-by-side slides designed for racing.
- Maui Wowie A double inner-tube ride through rushing white-capped water with a series of three gradual drop-offs. Splash pool exits into High Tide.
- Cowabunga Curl Three body slides entwined with each other.
- Runaway Rapids Dual sided tubed rapid simulated ride.
- Big Kahuna The Midwest's first and only gravity-driven water coaster.
- Hang Ten An enclosed, unlit single mat slide.
- Kokomo Lazy River 1,200-foot (370 m) circuit around the park.
- Pipeline Plunge A fully enclosed translucent tubular body slide for a final plunge into High Tide.
- Paradise Cove Heated spa pool.
- Kahuna Beach Wavepool A 750,000-US-gallon (2,800,000 L) wave pool, with rockwork and island waterfalls.
- High Tide Hoops Water basketball in a pool.
- Big Creek Beach A 600-gallon "dump bucket," water cannons, and four slides.
- Lil' Kahuna Waterworks Misting sprays, cascading fountains and shooting geysers for toddlers.
- Family Arcade An arcade that operated from 2013-2019, offering a variety of games for all ages.
- Club Splash A dance club for teens, every Tuesday night.
- Sand Volleyball Courts Four courts.
- The stage at Sunset Beach Palm trees, sand, and island ambiance.
- Cabana Rentals and Table service The cabanas are available for up to eight people. Reservations are recommended to guarantee a cabana.

== Holiday Fest ==
Holiday Fest at The Beach was an event that took place every year from late November to early January. Water slides were converted to toboggan runs, the wave pool became an ice rink, and the park was illuminated with holiday lighting. The event also featured carriage and pony rides. The name later changed to "The Beach on Ice". The Spirit Splash Ice Skating Rink featured at the event covered 7,500 square feet (700 m^{2}).

As of 2011, the water park was no longer hosting The Beach on Ice after 12 years due to low attendance in 2009 and 2010.
