= WaterWorks =

WaterWorks is the former name of several Cedar Fair water parks:

- Soak City (Kings Island): Known as WaterWorks from 1989-2004
- Soak City (Kings Dominion): Known as WaterWorks from 1999-2014
- Carolina Harbor: A water park at Carowinds, known as WaterWorks from 1997-2006

== See also ==
- Waterworks (disambiguation)
