= WaterWorks Park =

Amusement park in Redding, California

- Interactive map of WaterWorks Park
- Slogan: "You'll have fun fun shootin' down the mountain..."
- Location: 151 North Boulder Drive, Redding, California, United States
- Coordinates: 40.61226°N 122.36842°W
- Owner: Yanaco Corporation
- Opened: 1985
- Operating season: Spring and summer
- Website: waterworkspark.com

WaterWorks Park is a waterpark amusement park in Redding, California. It opened in 1984. It includes several waterslides. It is located on Highway 299 and Interstate 5 on eight acres approximately seven miles from Lake Shasta.

The park was owned by Slideco Recreations before being bought by Yanaco Corporation with Joe Murphy as president and CEO. The park was bought in 2005 at the beginning of the season by Joseph Murphy, sole owner of Yanaco Corporation. Waterworks Park is a Native American owned business.

Rides include the Bucking Bronco, the Whipper Snapper, and the Cork Screw flumes. A play area for children and the Raging River ride are also part of the park. The Avalanche ride was added in 2000. WaterWorks Park is located at 151 N. Boulder Drive. There was a similar WaterWorks Park in Issaquah, Washington that opened in 1985, but that park has since closed.
