= Albercas El Vergel =

Water park in Tijuana, Baja California, Mexico

- Interactive map of Albercas El Vergel
- Location: Tijuana, Baja California, Mexico
- Coordinates: 32.508°N 116.943°W
- Status: Operating
- Opened: 10 May 1964; 62 years ago
- Website: Official website

Albercas El Vergel (English: The Orchard Pools) is a water park in Tijuana, Baja California, Mexico. It was opened in 1964 and is the largest water park in the state. It is located about 7 mi (11 km) from the Mexico–United States border. The park is known for its extreme water slides, which have drawn widespread attention on social media and in local news coverage.

== History ==
Albercas El Vergel (English: The Orchard Pools) is a water park based in Tijuana, Baja California, Mexico. It was opened to the public on 10 May 1964 by Lucio Salazar González, a farmer who decided to convert his land into a water park. The park expanded its attractions over the years to include a river float, a wave pool, a rope swing, and multiple water slides. It is the largest water park in Baja California, located approximately 7 mi (11 km) south from the Mexico–United States border.

During the Christmas season, the park hosts a Christmas village featuring themed decorations, winter lights, and entertainment, an initiative originally introduced to draw visitors during the winter closure. The park's lazy river is converted into an ice skating rink, with skates available for rental or permitted to be brought by visitors.

In 2018, the park averaged between 1,000 and 2,000 visitors per day on summer weekends and approximately 500 on weekdays. In early 2020, the park closed in response to COVID-19 pandemic restrictions before reopening in August of that year with reduced capacity and sanitary protocols, including mandatory face masks outside of the pools.

In 2024, a gunman opened fire at the wave pool, wounding five guests. There were no fatalities and the injuries were reported as minor. The park temporarily closed before resuming operations. Authorities determined the gunman had been targeting José Guillermo Ayala Araiza, who was killed the following year in Tijuana.

== Attractions ==
Albercas El Vergel features a water slide named Slip N Fly, (Note: There is another Slip N Fly slide in the U.S. state of Ohio that predates the one in Albercas El Vergel.) opened in March 2016, standing 42 ft (13 m) tall and 344 ft (105 m) long, with an upward curve at the end that launches riders airborne into the pool. As the park's top attraction, the slide has drawn attention on social media for the distance it propels users upon entry into the water. It incorporates several column slides for users to choose from.

Gerardo Salazar, the founder's son, set out to build "something extreme" for Albercas El Vergel in 2015 after drawing inspiration from YouTube. Despite skepticism from those around him, the slide has increased park revenue by twenty percent and drawn a large number of visitors from the United States since its opening.

Part of Albercas El Vergel's appeal on social media, particularly among American visitors, has been driven by coverage from influencers with large followings, who have covered their experiences of the attractions since 2016. According to an interview conducted by The San Diego Union-Tribune, the park's extreme slides would likely invite litigation in the United States, a factor the publication noted adds to the park's mystique. The newspaper stated that visiting the park was "not for the faint of heart".

As of 2022, admission is MXN$200 for visitors taller than 1.31 m (4.3 ft), MXN$100 for those between 1 m (3.3 ft) and 1.31 m (4.3 ft), and free for those below 1 m (3.3 ft).
