= Six Flags White Water =

Water park in Cobb County, Georgia

- Interactive map of Six Flags White Water
- Location: Marietta, Georgia, United States
- Coordinates: 33°57′29″N 84°31′17″W
- Status: Operating
- Opened: May 1984
- Owner: Six Flags Over Georgia, Ltd.
- Operated by: Six Flags
- Slogan: The Southeast's Largest Water Park
- Operating season: May through September
- Area: 69 acres (280,000 m^{2})

Attractions
- Total: 20
- Website: Official website

Six Flags White Water is a 69-acre (280,000 m^{2}) water park located northwest of Atlanta, in Marietta, Georgia. Originally opening in 1984 as White Water Atlanta, the park became part of the Six Flags family of parks in 1999. Today, it is marketed as a second gate to Six Flags Over Georgia, and the two parks often cross-promote each other. In 2012, the park hosted 505,000 visitors, ranking it #12 on the list of the top water parks in North America.

== History ==
Six Flags White Water was constructed by Silver Dollar City, a theme park company known today as Herschend Family Entertainment, as a corporate sibling to their White Water park in Branson, Missouri and their White Water (Now Hurricane Harbor Oklahoma City) waterpark in Oklahoma, and first opened in 1984. In June 1998, the park was the site of an E. coli outbreak, which sickened at least ten children, including the son of then-Atlanta Braves baseball player Walt Weiss. In May 1999, the park was sold to the group of limited partners that own the nearby Six Flags Over Georgia theme park, with the park becoming "Six Flags White Water," and, like its sister park, being managed by Six Flags Theme Parks. Today, the two parks operate together, despite being roughly 15 miles apart, with each offering promotions for the other.

Six Flags White Water is one of five stand-alone Six Flags water parks, and the only one of the group to not use the Hurricane Harbor name.

In late 2010, Six Flags began the process of removing licensed themes from attractions. They terminated several licenses, including their license with The Wiggles. Wiggles Water World was renamed Buccaneer Bay in time for the 2011 season.

In July 2011, Six Flags introduced the Flash Pass at Six Flags White Water, and it became the first water park in the world to feature the virtual queue system for their water rides. Following the system's success, nine more Six Flags water parks implemented the system in 2012. For the 2013 season, White Water added Typhoon Twister, a five-story bowl slide.

In August 2013, Six Flags announced the addition of Hurricane Harbor, a seven-acre water park at Six Flags Over Georgia. When asked about the addition of a new water park when Six Flags already owned one in the area, communications manager Emily Murray replied, "With all the surveys that we’ve seen and the demand for a water park and the growth White Water has shown, White Water is still a large part of Six Flags, and [White Water and Hurricane Harbor] will complement each other." As part of the same announcement, Six Flags released plans to expand White Water's popular "Dive-In Movies" program, where films are shown on a screen to guests in the Atlanta Ocean wave pool, adding a stage at the wave pool for daytime concerts and music events. The stage was completed midway through the 2014 season. For the 2016 season, White Water added a mat racing slide, Wahoo Racer.

== Park layout ==
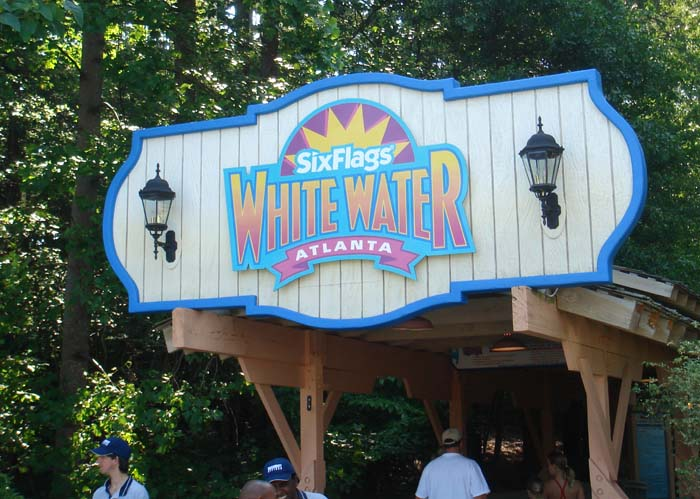
Park entrance

Six Flags White Water is made up of four separate sections, each with a number of attractions. When it first opened, the park consisted of what is today Wildwater Lagoon, Slippery Ridge and Pine Valley. Flash Flood Canyon was added in 1998, prior to the acquisition by Six Flags.

Wildwater Lagoon includes the park's main entrance and its primary services, including Guest Service and First Aid. It is built around an activity pool, which includes splashdown areas for the three Body Flumes, the two Rapids raft flumes, the Mutiny Chute plunge slide and Lizard's Tail kids' slides are also located here. The area's newest attraction is Typhoon Twister, a large water slide that consists of a 67-foot bowl.

Pine Valley is home to the park's wave pool, the Atlanta Ocean, and its lazy river, known as the Little Hooch, named in honor of the nearby Chattahoochee River. Children can play in the Captain Kid's Cove Buccaneer Bay and Treehouse Island play areas, while their older siblings and parents can slide into the giant blue and yellow funnel of Tornado.

In Slippery Ridge, visitors can experience the high-speed Dragon's Tail speed slides, or "compete" on the park's new-for-2016 Wahoo Racer six-lane racing slide tower, which replaces the older 100-Meter Splash slides. Raft riders can enjoy the enclosed Black River Falls and Gulf Coast Screamer slides solo, or share the experience at the Caribbean Plunge. The Bahama Bob-Slide uses large round rafts with up to six riders at once, while the adjacent Tidal Wave body flume lands in a splash pool connected to the Little Hooch lazy river.

Flash Flood Canyon contains the park's tallest single slide, the Dive Bomber, which shares a tower with the Run-A-Way River family raft slide.

== Slides and Attractions ==
Name	Section	Opened	Description	Height Requirement	Thrill Rating
Activity Pool	Wildwater Lagoon	1984	Watery play zone for the smallest kids		Mild
Atlanta Ocean Wave Pool	Pine Valley	1984	700,000 gallon wave pool		Mild
Bahama Bob Slide	Slippery Ridge	1991	Family raft slide	Over 36"	Moderate
Bermuda Triangle	Slippery Ridge	1987	Dual-raft slide	Over 42"	Moderate
Black River Falls	Slippery Ridge	1989	Dark tunnel slide	Over 42"	Moderate
Body Flumes	Wildwater Lagoon	1984		Over 42"	Moderate
Buccaneer Bay	Pine Valley	2010	Children's pirate-themed splash area		Mild
Captain Kid's Cove	Pine Valley	1992	Children's pirate-themed splash area	Under 54"	Mild
Caribbean Plunge	Slippery Ridge	1987	Single or Dual raft slide	Over 42"	Moderate
Dive Bomber (formerly Cliff-Hanger)	Flash Flood Canyon	1998	Tallest slide in White Water at 10 stories	Over 54"	Max
Dragon's Tail	Slippery Ridge	1984		Over 48"	Max
Gulf Screamer	Slippery Ridge	1985	Raft slide - 2-foot drop at the end	Over 42"	Moderate
Lily Pad Crossing	Wildwater Lagoon	1984			Mild
Little Hooch	Pine Valley	1984	1/4 Mile Lazy River		Mild
Lizard's Tail	Wildwater Lagoon	1984	Kid's version of the Dragon's Tail	Over 42"	Moderate
Mutiny Chute	Wildwater Lagoon	1984		Over 42"	Moderate
Run-A-Way River	Flash Flood Canyon	1998	Family raft slide	Over 36"	Moderate
Tornado	Pine Valley	2004		Over 48"	Max
Tidal Wave	Slippery Ridge	1990	Slide ends into the Little Hooch lazy river	Over 42"	Moderate
Tree House Island	Pine Valley	1994	Children's climbing structure & slides	Under 54"	Mild
Typhoon Twister	Wildwater Lagoon	2013		Over 48"	Max
Wahoo Racer	Slippery Ridge	2016	6 people race headfirst on mats	Over 42"	Moderate
Python Plunge	Wildwater Lagoon	2022	5 Story, 2 people tube slide	Over 54"	Maximum

== American Adventures ==
First opened in 1990, the American Adventures family entertainment center operated next door to White Water, even used the same parking lot. This facility included a number of small scale carnival rides, indoor and outdoor mini-golf, go-carts, games & video arcade, play area, and restaurant. All attractions were geared towards families with small children and originally visitors had to use a series of tickets to use the park (much like the old Disney ticket system.) Eventually visitors paid a single fee to play at the park.

Unlike most parks, American Adventures did not have a gate. Visitors could enter the attraction of their choice simply by walking across the parking lot. White Water maintained a single point of entry and the two promoted each other often, to the point of having a connecting pathway between the open plan of AA and the WW park entrance.

In an attempt to build attendance, the indoor mini golf course was removed to make way for an interactive "theater." Several years later (and for the same reason) the main building's central attraction, an antique carousel, was removed in favor of a four-story foam ball play structure appropriately named "the foam factory."

When Six Flags acquired White Water in 1999, American Adventures was included in the purchase, and the park was considered one of Six Flags' minor parks.

However, in June 2008, the park was leased to a new operator, Zuma Holdings, which no longer co-branded the park with Six Flags White Water. In 2010, American Adventures closed its doors for good, citing "circumstances beyond our control."

After the closing of American Adventures by Zuma Holdings, Six Flags Atlanta Properties took the property back over and now uses the property for trainings, HR, storage and the employee cafeteria. One of the rides, the Scrambler was removed and taken to Six Flags Great Adventure and renamed Déjà Vu (now known as Scrambler) in 2012.

== Incidents ==
March 2016: Two individuals broke into the park, went past three fences, and skateboarded down the Tornado water slide as a half pipe. They were arrested on felony charges of criminal damage to property, causing an estimated $20,000 in damages to the fiberglass coat covering the slide.
