= Talking Rock (disambiguation) =

Talking Rock may refer to:

- Talking Rock, Georgia, a town in Pickens County
- Talking Rock Creek, a stream in Georgia
- Talking Rock Ranch, a master planned community in Prescott, Arizona
- Talking Rocks Cavern, in Missouri
