= Splish Splash =

Splish Splash may refer to

- "Splish Splash" (song)
- Splish Splash (amusement park)
- Splish Splash, episode of Barney & Friends
