= James Owen =

James Owen may refer to:

== Politics ==
- James Owen (American politician) (1784–1865), U.S. Representative from North Carolina 1817–1819
- James Mason Owen (1903–1972), American mayor of Branson, Missouri, entrepreneur
- James Alexander Owen (1891–1955), American physician and politician from Mississippi

== Sports ==
- Jimmy Owen (1864–?), English association footballer of the 1880s and 1890s for Port Vale and Stoke
- James Owen (footballer) (born 1991), Welsh footballer with Barrow
- Jim Owen, rugby league footballer of the 1920s for Great Britain, England, and St. Helens Recs

== Other ==
- Jim Owen (singer-songwriter) (1941−2020), American singer and songwriter
- James Owen (British author) (born 1969), British historian and journalist
- James A. Owen (born 1969), American comic book creator, publisher and writer
- James E. Owen, British astrophysicist

== See also ==
- James Owens (disambiguation)
- Jimmy Owens (disambiguation)
