= Jimmy Owens =

Jimmy Owens may refer to:

- Jimmy and Carol Owens, songwriting team
- Jimmy Owens (musician) (born 1942), jazz trumpet player
- Jimmy Owens (racing driver), race car driver
- Jimmy Owens (Nelo Ambassador Australia)

== See also ==
- Jim Owens (disambiguation)
- James Owens (disambiguation)
- James Owen (disambiguation)
