= Dolly Parton's Stampede =

Dinner theater chain in the United States

Dolly Parton's Stampede Dinner Attraction
- Type: Dinner attraction
- Industry: Tourism
- Founded: 1988; 38 years ago in Pigeon Forge, Tennessee, United States
- Founder: Dolly Parton
- Number of locations: 2 current, 2 former
- Parent: World Choice Investments, LLC
- Website: dpstampede.com

Dolly Parton's Stampede Dinner Attraction is a chain of dinner theaters located in the United States. Dolly Parton's Stampede is owned by the estate of entertainer Dolly Parton and managed by World Choice Investments LLC, a joint venture between The Dollywood Company, Fred Hardwick, and Herschend Family Entertainment Corporation.

The attraction was originally known as "Dolly Parton's Dixie Stampede" and the show was themed to an American Civil War competition between the Union and the Confederacy. In January 2018, the attraction was renamed to "Dolly Parton's Stampede" and removed the Civil War-era theming. Parton released a statement saying that "attitudes change" and that the name change was done to "remove any confusion or concerns about our shows and will help our efforts to expand into new cities."

== Locations ==
=== Current ===
==== Pigeon Forge ====
The first location opened in Pigeon Forge, Tennessee in 1988, just outside the entrance to Parton's theme park, Dollywood.

==== Branson ====
A Branson, Missouri location was announced in 1994 and opened in 1995.

=== Former ===
==== Myrtle Beach ====
A second location opened in Myrtle Beach, South Carolina in 1992. In September 2010, Parton announced the Myrtle Beach theater would close after 18 years for refurbishment changing from the Civil War theme to a pirate-themed Pirates Voyage Dinner and Show. This included installation of a 15 foot (4.6 m) deep, 750,000 US gallons (2,800,000 L; 620,000 imp gal) pool, theatrical lighting and rigging for acrobats. During November and December, the show includes Christmas elements.

==== Orlando ====
Opened in June 2003, the Orlando location closed January 2008 following what a company spokesman called "our best Christmas season". The property was purchased by Orlando Premium Outlets and the 1,086-capacity theater was torn down in 2012 to make way for an outlet mall.

== Food ==
During the performance, guests are served a fixed, four-course meal prepared on-site. The standard menu consists of a creamy vegetable soup, a biscuit, a whole rotisserie chicken, hickory-smoked pulled pork, mashed potatoes, corn on the cob, a specialty dessert, and unlimited Coca-Cola products, tea, or coffee. Vegetarian and gluten-free options are available if requested prior to the show. Guests are encouraged to eat with their hands, but silverware is available upon request.
