= Pirates Voyage Dinner and Show =

Dinner theater chain

- Type: Dinner attraction
- Industry: Tourism
- Founded: Pigeon Forge, Tennessee, United States; 1988 (38 years ago)
- Number of locations: 3 current, 2 former
- Parent: World Choice Investments, LLC
- Website: piratesvoyage.com

Pirates Voyage Dinner and Show is a dinner theater located in Myrtle Beach, South Carolina, Pigeon Forge, Tennessee, and Panama City Beach, Florida. Pirates Voyage is owned by entertainer Dolly Parton and managed by World Choice Investments LLC, a joint venture between The Dollywood Company, Fred Hardwick, and Herschend.

On September 22, 2010, Parton announced the Myrtle Beach theater would close for refurbishment after 18 years service as the Dolly Parton's Dixie Stampede show for conversion to a pirate themed show. The new show features Blackbeard, a pirate with a history along the North and South Carolina coasts. Upgrades to the theater included installation of a 15 foot (4.6 m) deep, 750,000 US gallons (2,800,000 L; 620,000 imp gal) pool, theatrical lighting and rigging for acrobats. During November and December, the show includes Christmas elements. In December 2023, Parton announced that Pirates Voyage would be opening a third location in Panama City Beach, Florida, which broke ground in 2024 and opened June 6, 2025.
