= Pipeline Express =

Boardwalk Fun Park
- Location: Boardwalk Fun Park
- Coordinates: 32.761°N 96.997°W
- Status: Removed
- Opening date: July 23, 1992
- Closing date: September 7, 1992
- Cost: $450,000 US

General statistics
- Type: Steel
- Manufacturer: Bailey Rides, Inc.
- Designer: Ken Bailey
- Model: Auto Sled
- Lift/launch system: Cart return (no lift)
- Height: 45 ft (14 m)
- Length: 1,200 ft (370 m)
- Speed: 15 mph (24 km/h)
- Inversions: 0
- Duration: 1:00
- Height restriction: 36 in (91 cm)
- Pipeline Express at RCDB

Pipeline Express was a steel roller coaster located at Boardwalk Fun Park in Grand Prairie, Texas. When built in 1992, the coaster was the newest Auto Sled model from Bailey Manufacturing of Cameron, Ontario. The five sleds could hold one rider each.

In September 1992, an accident on the coaster threw a 12-year-old girl some 35 feet (11 m) into an unused pool beneath it causing her to slip into a coma and suffer brain trauma. It was closed following the accident. The girl's parents sued the park for negligence and deceptive trade practices.

The coaster never reopened and remained standing until 1997, when it was demolished along with the rest of the park.
