= Shoji Tabuchi =

Shoji Tabuchi 田淵 章二
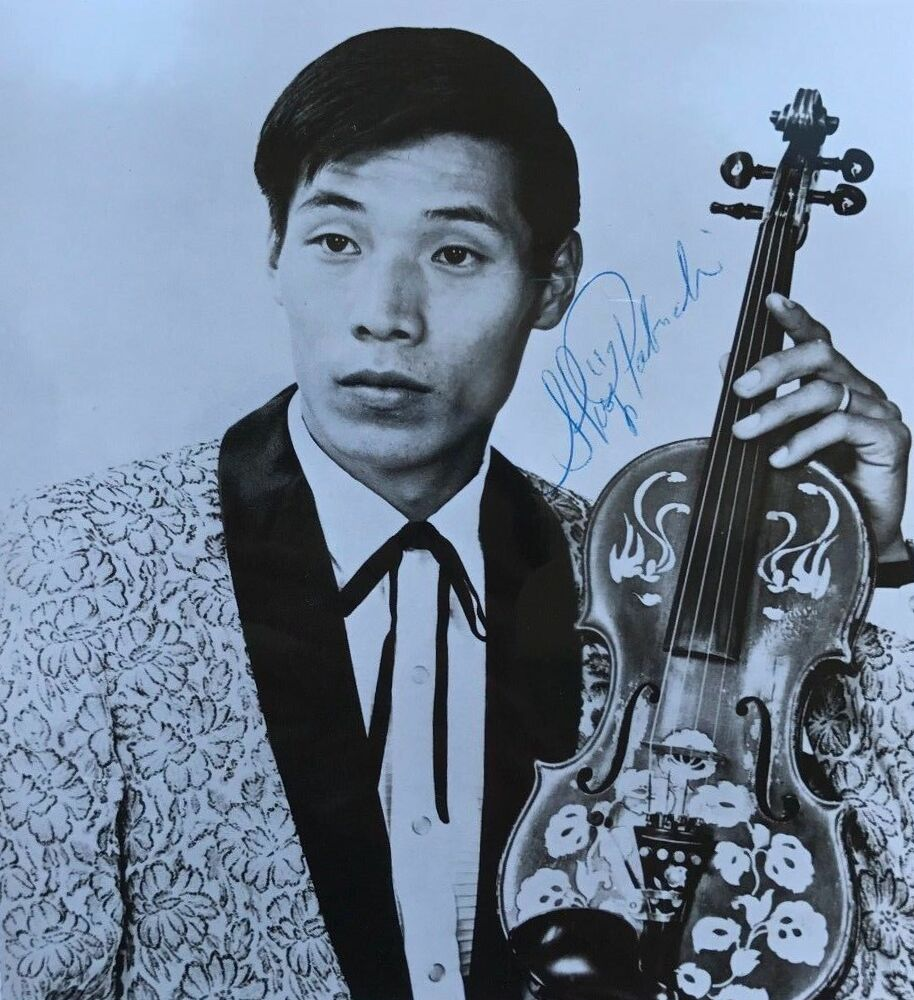
- Tabuchi in 1971

Background information
- Born: Shoji Tabuchi; April 16, 1944; Daishōji, Ishikawa, Japan (now Kaga, Ishikawa, Japan)
- Died: August 11, 2023 (aged 79) Branson, Missouri, U.S.
- Genres: Country, gospel
- Instrument: Violin
- Years active: 1967–2022
- Website: www.shoji.com (archive)

Shoji Tabuchi (田淵 章二, Tabuchi Shōji; April 16, 1944 – August 11, 2023) was a Japanese-American country music fiddler and singer who performed at his theater, the Shoji Tabuchi Theatre, in Branson, Missouri. Nicknamed "The King of Branson", Tabuchi won numerous awards and was inducted into the National Fiddler Hall of Fame in 2020.

== Early life ==
Shoji Tabuchi was born on April 16, 1944, in Daishōji, Ishikawa, Japan (now Kaga, Ishikawa, Japan). After the encouragement of his mother, Tabuchi took up the violin at age 7 and studied using the Suzuki method.

== Career ==
In the mid-1960s, when Tabuchi was a sophomore in college in Osaka, Japan, he saw a performance by Roy Acuff and became enamored with bluegrass music after hearing Acuff's fiddler Howdy Forrester perform "Listen to the Mockingbird". After meeting Acuff backstage, Tabuchi went on to form a band called the Bluegrass Ramblers, who won a national contest in Japan. In 1967, he eschewed graduating from college in order to emigrate to San Francisco with only his violin and a few hundred dollars.

After living in San Francisco, Kansas City, and Louisiana, Tabuchi moved to Nashville to reconnect with Acuff, who arranged for Tabuchi to perform on Grand Ole Opry, where he would appear 27 times. From 1970 to 1975, Tabuchi toured as the opening act for country musician David Houston. Tabuchi would perform with many other country artists, including Tammy Wynette, Mel Tillis, George Jones, Barbara Mandrell, Johnny Cash, Ray Stevens, Dolly Parton and Conway Twitty.

=== The Shoji Tabuchi Show ===
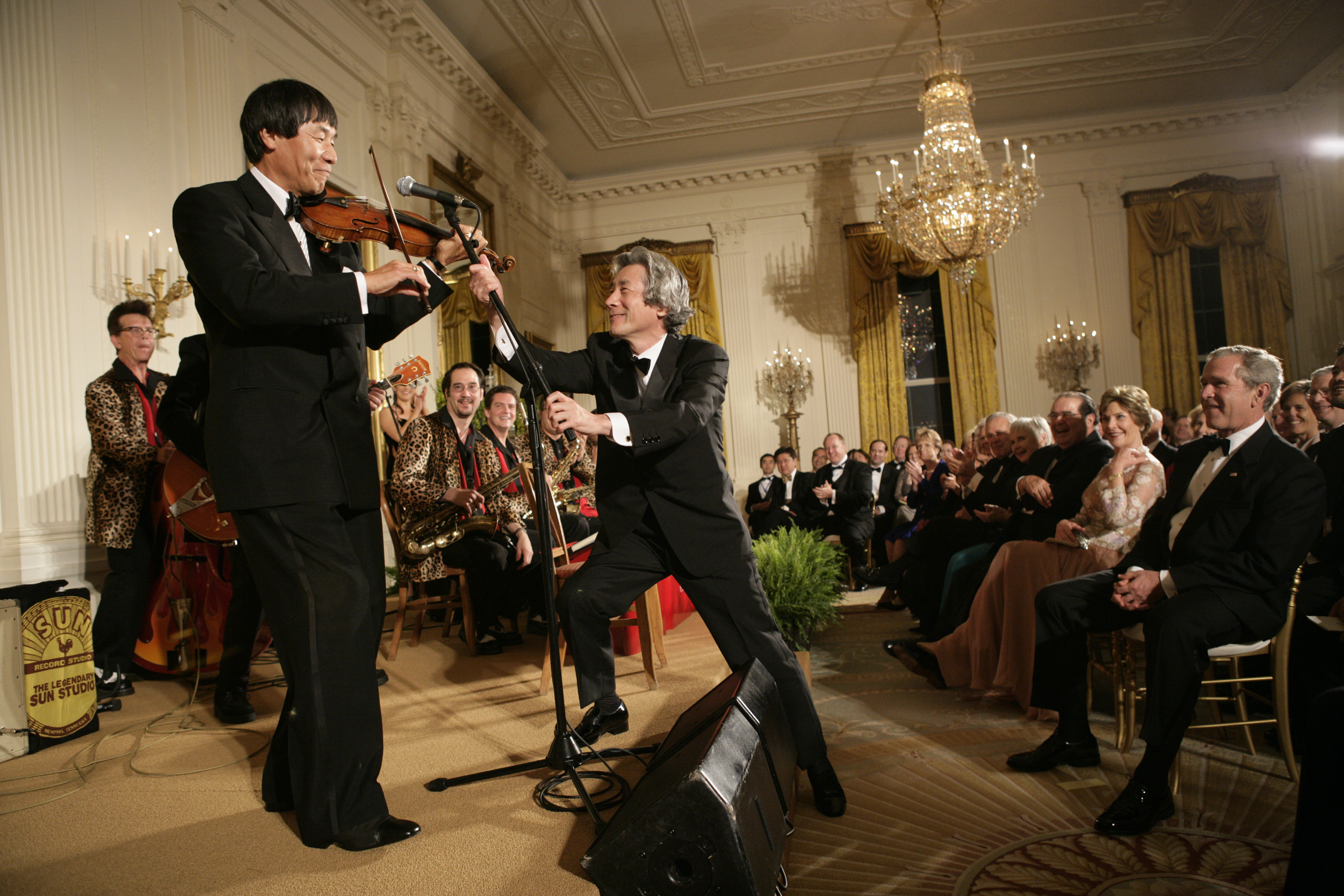
Shoji Tabuchi performing at the White House in 2006

Tabuchi arrived in Branson, Missouri in 1980 and was offered a six-month residency performing at the Starlite Theatre. After performing successfully for a few years, he oversaw the construction of one of Branson's most elaborate theaters, which was completed in 1990, and began hosting his own show.

The Shoji Tabuchi Show blended contemporary country music with elements of traditional Japanese theatre. Besides country, the show also incorporated gospel, Cajun, rap, rock, taiko drumming, pop music and showtunes, as well as polka and Hawaiian music. Tabuchi's wife Dorothy and daughter Christina also performed with him, and each professional musician in his ensemble possessed at least one music degree. Tabuchi employed about 200 personnel at his elaborate 2,000-seat theater, where he performed two shows daily for most of the year. His performances garnered him the nickname "The King of Branson".

In May 2017, the theater was temporarily closed following a backstage fire. While the fire only covered a 10-by-10 foot area, smoke spread throughout the auditorium and into the lobby and there was additional water damage. The theater reopened on October 22, 2018, by which time the show had moved to the Clay Cooper Theatre. After a near-three-year hiatus from performing during the COVID-19 pandemic, Tabuchi returned with the year-long "An Evening With Shoji" at Branson's Little Opry Theatre in spring 2022.

== Accolades ==
Tabuchi received several accolades throughout his career, including the Japanese Foreign Minister's Award, the Missourian Award, and the Americanism Medal from the Daughters of the American Revolution. In 2020, Tabuchi was inducted into the National Fiddler Hall of Fame.

Tabuchi won several Ozark Music Awards, including Entertainer of the Year, and was named their Instrumentalist of the Year four times. He was also the recipient of the Branson Terry Awards Lifetime Achievement and Humanitarian Award. In 2021, the city of Branson declared August 31 to be "Shoji, Dorothy, and Christina Tabuchi Day", in honor of the family's contributions to the city.

The documentary Shoji Tabuchi: An American Dream premiered at Branson IMAX Entertainment Complex's 9th annual Military Film Festival in November 2021.

Tabuchi performed for U.S. presidents George H. W. Bush and George W. Bush, was recognized in USA Today and Time, and was featured on 60 Minutes, Live with Regis and Kathie Lee and Good Morning America.

== Personal life ==
Tabuchi became an American citizen in 1998.

Tabuchi met his first wife, Mary Jo, at a restaurant where he would perform for tips. The two married in 1968. They moved to Kansas City, and in 1974 they had a son, Shoji John Tabuchi.

After moving to Branson in 1980, he met his second wife, Dorothy Lingo, after she attended several of his shows at the Starlite Theater, and he became the stepfather to her two children from a previous marriage. Lingo helped with numerous production aspects of The Shoji Tabuchi Show, such as choreography, costume design, and the theater's interior design. Tabuchi's stepdaughter, Christina, became a featured vocalist and entertainer in The Shoji Tabuchi Show at age 8 and eventually became vocal director and co-dance captain of the show. Tabuchi's stepson, Thomas Jason Lingo-Tabuchi, died at age 19. Branson Music School has a scholarship in his name, and a community center in Oak Grove, Louisiana also bears his name.

Shoji Tabuchi died of pancreatic cancer on August 11, 2023, at the age of 79.

== Discography ==
- 1973: Japan to Nashville (not on label)
- 1975: Country Music My Way (ABC/Dot)
- 1978: Fiddles & Sings (Jin)
- 1980: Live at the Grapevine Opry (ASR/TM4)
- 1984: Classy (Shoji Entertainments)
- 1987: Fiddlin' Around (Shoji Entertainments)
- 1996: Notes from Shoji (Shoji Entertainments)
- 2000: Different Moods: Collection One (Shoji Entertainments)
- 2002: The Shoji Tabuchi Show! Volume IV (Shoji Entertainments)
- 2007: Music From My Heart (Shoji Entertainments)

Dates unknown

- In Concert (ASR)
- Songs for the Lord...And You! (Shoji Entertainments)
- Live from Branson (Shoji Entertainments)
- Shoji After Dark (Shoji Entertainments)
- Rove Retters From Shoji (ASR)
