= Water Country =

Water park in Portsmouth, New Hampshire, United States

- Interactive map of Water Country
- Slogan: "Adventure Plays Here" and "Have Some Fun"
- Location: Portsmouth, New Hampshire, United States
- Coordinates: 43°02′10″N 70°46′54″W
- Owner: Herschend
- Opened: June 20, 1984; 41 years ago
- Website: http://www.watercountry.com/

Water Country is a water park located in Portsmouth, New Hampshire, United States.

== History ==
Opened in 1984, the park was owned by the Samuels family until they were bought out by Festival Fun Parks in 2000. Currently owned by Herschend, it has a number of slides and swimming pools that range for all ages.

Water Country allows its guests to bring picnic lunches into the park with a carry-in policy limiting bag sizes; a number of picnic areas are available at various points throughout the park. Alcoholic beverages and smoking, however, are prohibited in the park, as are glass containers.

In 2022, Water Country reported that it typically hires 300 employees each summer to work as lifeguards or cashiers, or in other areas such as admissions, guest relations, and maintenance. Three years later, the park was sold to Herschend.

== Jingle and mascot ==
Their commercials feature a jingle that has remained the same since the park opened in 1984; its melody is reminiscent of Mungo Jerry's 1970 hit "In the Summertime". It was composed by Tom Roussell in 1984 while working for Kevin Tracey Productions and later re-recorded when the original 10 year license expired.

Water Country's mascot was a polar bear named Patches, but Patches was given to Water Country's sister park, Lake Compounce in Connecticut. In 2024, Water Country announced a new mascot named Spruce the Moose.

== See also ==
- List of water parks
