= Dutch Wonderland Inn =

Dutch Wonderland themed Hotel in Lancaster, Pennsylvania

General information
- Location: East Lampeter Township, Pennsylvania
- Opening: January 1, 2026
- Owner: Herschend

Technical details
- Floor count: 2

Other information
- Number of rooms: 155

Website
- Official website

The Dutch Wonderland Inn was a resort-style hotel located in East Lampeter Township, Pennsylvania. It opened on January 1, 2026.

== History ==
After Cartoon Network Hotel's closure on January 1, 2026, Dutch Wonderland Inn was opened on January 1, 2026, which had 155 rooms, four suites, an arcade, indoor and outdoor pools, a splash pad, and themed dining.
