= Hughes Family =

American family music group

The Hughes Family
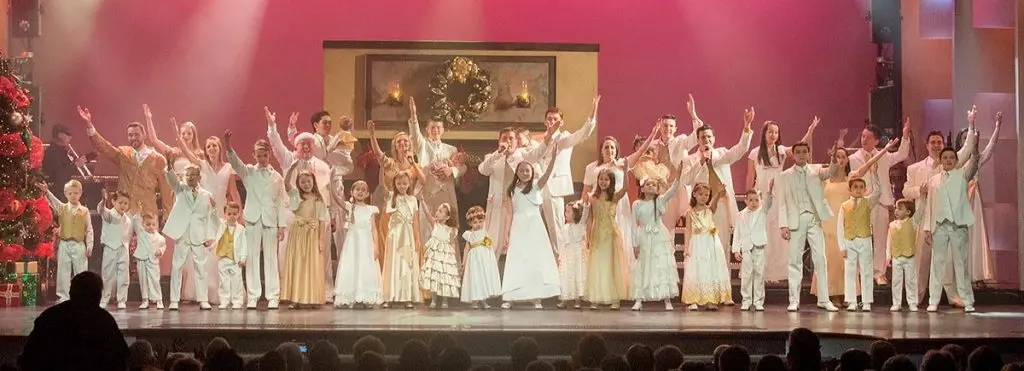

Background information
- Also known as: The Hughes Brothers
- Origin: Taylorsville, Utah, U.S.
- Genres: Country music
- Members: Marty Hughes; Jason Hughes; Adam Hughes; Ryan Hughes; Andy Hughes
- Website: hughesentertainmentinc.com

The Hughes Family is an American family music group. The group was originally formed by brothers Marty, Jason, Adam, Ryan, and Andy Hughes, sons of Lena and Gary Hughes, while growing up in Taylorsville, Utah. The brothers moved to Branson, Missouri in the 90s, where they performed country and western music at Silver Dollar City and other venues. They later purchased the Roy Clark Celebrity Theatre, now named the Hughes Brothers Theatre.

The Hughes Family now operates a variety of live music shows from their theater, including the Hughes Music Show, which mentions that they are the world's largest performing family; the Hughes Brothers Country Show, which features the brothers themselves singing country music classics; and Re-Vibe, which features the younger generation of the brothers' children singing, dancing, and playing a variety of instruments; and the award-winning Hughes Family Christmas Show. The theater also hosts several other shows not produced by the family.

The Hughes Brothers are members of the Church of Jesus Christ of Latter-day Saints. The Hughes Family is one of several prominent LDS families who perform live music shows in Branson, including the Duttons and formerly the Bretts and the Osmonds.
