= Boardwalk Fun Park =

Amusement park in northeast Grand Prairie, Texas

Boardwalk Family Fun Park
- Interactive map of Boardwalk Family Fun Park
- Location: Grand Prairie, Texas, United States
- Coordinates: 32.761°N 96.997°W
- Opened: July 1982
- Closed: November 1992
- Previous names: White Water Grand Prairie (1982-1985)
- Status: Defunct[[]]
- Area: 28-acre (110,000 m^{2}); 24-acre (97,000 m^{2}) (as White Water)
- Water slides: 15 rides & 1 roller coaster water slides

Boardwalk Fun Park was a 28-acre (110,000 m^{2}) amusement park located in northeast Grand Prairie, Texas near the intersection of Belt Line Road and Interstate 30. It was originally a water park.

== History ==
The park was originally built and developed in 1982 by Herschend Family Entertainment Corporation as "White Water" in the Grand Prairie Entertainment district, along with Lion Country Safari and the Palace of Wax.

The site was purchased and closed by Wet 'n Wild Inc. at the end of 1985 to reduce competition at their park 5 miles (8.0 km) away in nearby Arlington, Texas. The closure was condemned by the city council who were granted a restraining order preventing dismantling of the park. The council dropped their attempt to gain control of the park after a task force determined that it would be too expensive.

The park was redeveloped in 1991 and 1992 as Boardwalk Fun Park. The new owners used much of the old infrastructure and rides in the new park. The park suffered delays in construction and ride certifications, and it opened in July 1992. In September 1992, an accident on the park's roller coaster, the Pipeline Express, threw a 12-year-old girl approximately 35 feet (11 m) into an unused pool beneath the ride causing her to slip into a coma and suffer brain trauma. The coaster was closed following the accident. The victims parents sued the park for negligence and deceptive trade practices.

The park aimed at reopening for the 1993 season, which did not occur. After sitting closed for several years, in 1996 the park's land was purchased by Automotive Investment Group and the infrastructure and rides were removed in April 1997. The Grand Prairie Ford car dealership was constructed on the site in 1999.

== Rides and attractions ==
- Pipeline Express - Bailey Auto Sled
