= James Owens =

James or Jim Owens may refer to:

== Sports ==
- Jesse Owens (James Cleveland Owens; 1913–1980), American track and field athlete, and Olympian
- James Owens (American football, born 1955), American football player and Olympic athlete
- James Owens (American football coach) (1951–2016), American football player and coach
- Jim Owens (1927–2009), head football coach at the University of Washington (1957–1974)
- Jim Owens (baseball) (1934–2020), American baseball pitcher
- Jim Owens (basketball, born 1950), American basketball player
- Red Owens (James L. Owens; 1925–1988), American basketball player
- James Owens (referee) (born 1977), Irish hurling referee

== Politics and military ==
- James Byeram Owens (1816–1889), Confederate politician
- James W. Owens (congressman) (1837–1900), US Representative from Ohio
- James C. Owens Jr. (1910–1942), American naval aviator
- James Owens (VC) (1829–1901), Irish soldier and recipient of the Victoria Cross
- James Lawrence Owens (1899–1960), Alberta provincial MLA

== Other ==
- James B. Owens (1920–2009), American engineer and executive
- James W. Owens, chairman and CEO of Caterpillar
- James Owens, lead plaintiff in a civil suit against Sudan for its role in the 1998 United States embassy bombings that led to an award of over $10 billion in damages

== See also ==
- USS James C. Owens, US Navy destroyer
- Jimmy Owens (disambiguation)
- James Owen (disambiguation)
