= Dollywood's Splash Country =

Water park in Pigeon Forge, Tennessee

- Previously known as Dolly's Splash Country
- The logo as of 2016
- Interactive map of Dollywood's Splash Country
- Location: 1210 Dollywood Resorts Blvd, Pigeon Forge, Tennessee, 37863-4102, United States
- Coordinates: 35°48′35″N 83°32′03″W
- Opened: 2001
- Owner: Herschend, estate of Dolly Parton
- Slogan: Love Every Moment
- Operating season: May–September
- Area: 35 acres (140,000 m^{2})

Attractions
- Total: 16
- Website: www.dollywood.com/waterpark

Dollywood's Splash Country is a 35-acre (14 ha) water park located in Pigeon Forge, Tennessee, adjacent to the Dollywood theme park. The park's central theme rests around entertainer Dolly Parton's childhood swimming in the rivers of the Great Smoky Mountains. Dollywood's Splash Country operates from May through September.

Dollywood and Dollywood's Splash Country are co-owned by the Herschend Corporation and the estate of country music star Dolly Parton.

== History ==
Opened in May 2001 in Pigeon Forge, Tennessee, Dolly's Splash Country is an addition to the Dollywood Company's theme park. The park is built into the natural terrain of a 25-acre mountainous area adjacent to the main Dollywood theme park. The park was a $20 million investment ($36.4 million in 2025 dollars) by the Dollywood Company.

To decide on a name for the park, Dolly Parton held a contest to come up with the most original name. Parton received over 16,000 entries. John Torres' entry won, and he and his family were rewarded with five years' worth of seasonal passes and a canoe that was signed by Dolly Parton.

The park opened with attractions such as the Mountain Waves wave pool, Raging River Rapids, the Downbound Float Trip lazy river, the Butterfly, Little Creek Falls, Wild River Falls, and Mountain Scream.

In 2003, a $1.5 million ($2.63 million in 2025 dollars), 2-acre (8,100 m^{2}) expansion called Raintree Hollow opened featuring Soaker Springs and Mountain Twist.

In 2004, Dolly's Splash Country changed its name to Dollywood's Splash Country. That same year, Dollywood's Splash Country added Big Bear Plunge and debuted the Riverside Retreats.

The former logo was used until 2016.

In 2005, the park opened Bear Mountain Fire Tower, a multi-level play structure, and quick-service restaurant Brushfire Grill.

In 2006, Dollywood's Splash Country added an attraction consisting of twin-speed slides called Fire Tower Falls. This attraction opened up a new path to the Mountain Waves attraction.

In 2010, Dollywood's Splash Country added Slick Rock Racer, a four-lane mat slide, spanning 300 ft (91 m) in length. The ride starts with an initial dip to build speed allowing riders to gain additional momentum to propel them to the finish. This ride was a $1 million expansion located between Mountain Twist and Raging River Rapids.

In 2013, Dollywood's Splash Country opened River Rush. River Rush uses ProSlide Technology's hydromagnetic technology to propel the rafts up hills. Dollywood's Splash Country also introduced the Timesaver H_{2}O pass allowing guests to reserve their place in an attraction line. Dollywood's Splash Country logo received minor updates.

In 2017, a new attraction called Tailspin Racer was opened at the entrance to the park. Wild River Falls saw a major facelift, including new paint on the slides' exteriors.

== Awards ==
- 2001 - Dollywood's Splash Country was named the World Waterpark Association's Best New Water Park in America.
- 2007 - Dollywood's Splash Country was awarded the Must-See Waterpark Award at the 2009 International Association of Amusement Parks and Attractions (IAAPA) Expo in Las Vegas.
- 2013 - River Rush was voted the Best New Ride (Waterpark) of 2013 in Amusement Today's Golden Ticket Awards.
