= Herschend =

American entertainment company

Herschend Family Entertainment Corporation
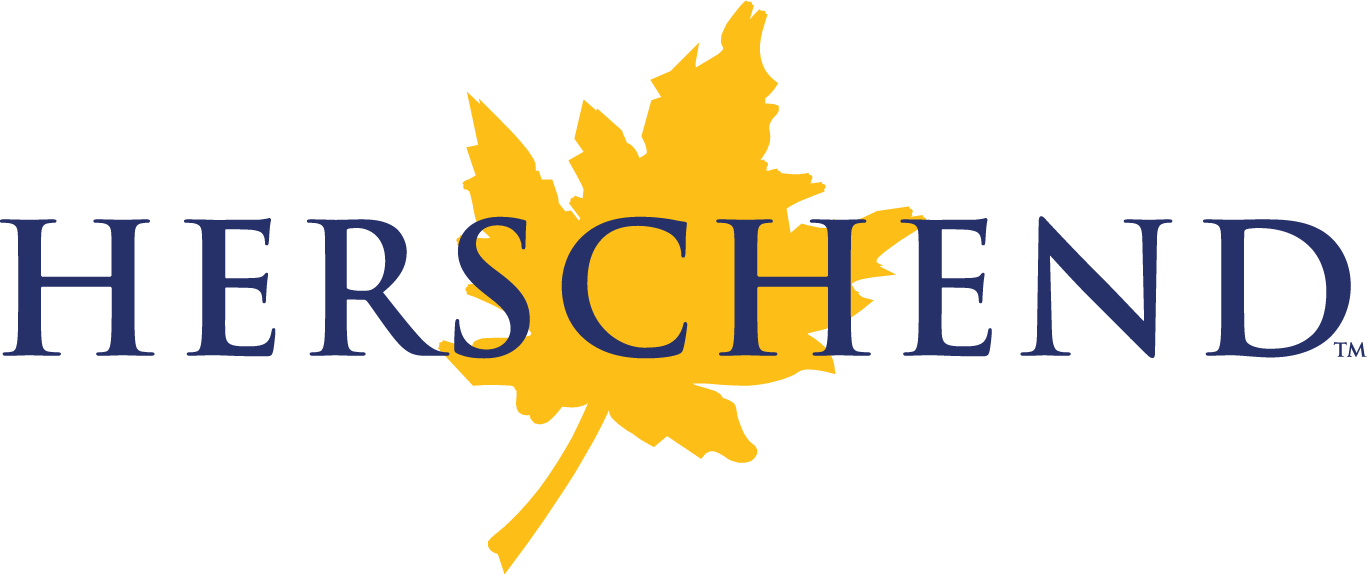
- Trade name: Herschend
- Formerly: Herschend Enterprises (1950–1982); Silver Dollar City, Inc. (1983–2003)
- Type: Private
- Industry: Entertainment
- Founded: 1950
- Founder: Hugo Herschend; Mary Herschend; Jack Herschend; Pete Herschend
- Headquarters: Peachtree Corners, Georgia, U.S.
- Area served: United States and Canada
- Key people: Andrew Wexler, CEO
- Services: Amusement parks; water parks; tourist attractions; zoos; aquariums; lodging; dinner theaters; sports entertainment
- Website: www.hfecorp.com

Herschend Family Entertainment Corporation (doing business as Herschend) is an American entertainment company headquartered in Peachtree Corners, Georgia, United States. It operates several theme parks and tourist attractions within the United States, and as of 2021, one of its aquariums is in Vancouver, British Columbia, Canada.

Founded by Hugo, Mary, Jack, and Pete Herschend of Branson, Missouri, in its early years the company was simply known as Herschend Enterprises. In the 1980s the name was changed to Silver Dollar City Inc., before gaining its current name in 2003.

== History ==
HFE traces roots back to Hugo and Mary Herschend from Detroit, Michigan along with sons Jack and Pete. The family vacationed in Missouri's Ozark Mountains region and fell in love with the nature the area offered. In 1951 Hugo obtained a 99-year lease on a Branson, Missouri area attraction called Marvel Cave. Hugo suffered a heart attack and later died in 1955; however, Mary along with her two sons continued to improve the cave attraction by installing electric lighting and building concrete walkways. A cable train was installed in 1958 to ferry guests out of the depths of the cave upon the end of the tour. The attendance nearly doubled and a small frontier town was erected to entertain visitors as they waited for their cave tour. In order to increase attendance, a gimmick was used by naming the village "Silver Dollar City" and distributing silver dollars as change to every visitor in hope that when they would spend the rare coins they would tell people where they had gotten them. The idea was a success, and the Herschend family soon found themselves involved in the theme park business.

In 1969, Silver Dollar City drew national attention when producer Paul Henning brought the cast and crew of the popular Beverly Hillbillies television show to the park to film five episodes.

In 2010, Herschend Family Entertainment was featured on an episode of the reality TV series Undercover Boss.

The company also co-owns and co-operates with partners Dolly Parton's company The Dollywood Company, the dinner and theatre company Pirates Voyage Dinner and Show in Myrtle Beach, South Carolina, and Dolly Parton's Stampede (formerly Dixie Stampede).

In April 2021, Herschend announced its purchase of the Vancouver Aquarium following the latter's severe economic losses during the COVID-19 pandemic.

In March 2025, Herschend announced its purchase of Palace Entertainment from Parques Reunidos, bringing parks like Kennywood and Lake Compounce into the chain, along with many other properties.

== Current properties ==
=== Amusement parks ===
Locations of Herschend amusement parks — Fully or jointly owned by Herschend

==== Owned/operated ====
Name	Location	Year opened	Year acquired	Notes
Dollywood	Pigeon Forge, Tennessee	1961	1976	Sold stake to Dolly Parton in 1986
Kentucky Kingdom	Louisville, Kentucky	1987	2021	Owned by the Kentucky State Fair Board but operated by HFE
Silver Dollar City	Branson, Missouri	1960		
Wild Adventures	Valdosta, Georgia	1996	2007	Purchased for $34.5 million ($53.6 million in 2025 dollars)
Silverwood Theme Park	Athol, Idaho	1988	2026	
Adventureland	Altoona, Iowa	1974	2025	Acquired from Parques Reunidos.
Dutch Wonderland	Lancaster, Pennsylvania	1963	2025	Acquired from Parques Reunidos.
Idlewild and Soak Zone	Ligonier, Pennsylvania	1878	2025	Acquired from Parques Reunidos.
Kennywood	West Mifflin, Pennsylvania	1899	2025	Acquired from Parques Reunidos.
Lake Compounce	Bristol, Connecticut	1846	2025	Acquired from Parques Reunidos.
Story Land	Glen, New Hampshire	1954	2025	Acquired from Parques Reunidos.

=== Water parks ===
Name	Location	Year opened	Year acquired	Notes
Dollywood's Splash Country	Pigeon Forge, Tennessee	2001		
Hurricane Bay	Louisville, Kentucky	1992	2021	Included with admission to Kentucky Kingdom
Adventure Bay	Altoona, Iowa	2008	2025	Included with admission to Adventureland
Splash Island	Valdosta, Georgia	2003	2007	Included with admission to Wild Adventures
White Water Branson	Branson, Missouri	1980		
Boulder Beach Water Park	Athol, Idaho	2003	2026	Included with admission to Silverwood
Noah's Ark Water Park	Wisconsin Dells, Wisconsin	1979	2025	Acquired from Parques Reunidos.
Sandcastle Waterpark	West Homestead, Pennsylvania	1989	2025	Acquired from Parques Reunidos.
Splish Splash	Riverhead, New York	1989	2025	Acquired from Parques Reunidos.
Water Country	Portsmouth, New Hampshire	1984	2025	Acquired from Parques Reunidos.

=== Aquariums and Zoos ===
Name	Location	Year opened	Year acquired	Notes
Adventure Aquarium	Camden, New Jersey	1992	2007	
Newport Aquarium	Newport, Kentucky	1999	2007	
Vancouver Aquarium	Vancouver, British Columbia	1956	2021	
Living Shores Aquarium	Glen, New Hampshire	2019	2025	Acquired from Parques Reunidos.
Sea Life Park	Waimanalo Beach, Hawaii	1964	2025	Acquired from Parques Reunidos.

=== Attractions ===
Name	Location	Year opened	Year acquired	Notes
Talking Rocks Cavern	Stone County, Missouri		1969	
Callaway Gardens	Pine Mountain, Georgia	1952	2022	Leased from Ida Cason Callaway Foundation

=== Dinner shows ===
Name	Location	Year opened	Year acquired	Notes
Dolly Parton's Stampede	Pigeon Forge & Branson	1988 & 1995		Chain of dinner theaters, Formerly in Myrtle Beach & Orlando
Pirates Voyage	Myrtle Beach, Pigeon Forge & Panama City Beach	1992, 2019 & 2025		Dinner theatre first opened as a Dolly Parton's Dixie Stampede but converted to Pirates Voyage in 2011. Pigeon Forge location opened in 2019. Panama City Beach location opened in 2025.
Hatfield and McCoys	Pigeon Forge	2010		Dinner theatre
Showboat Branson Belle	Table Rock Lake in Branson, Missouri	1995		A dinner, show and cruise originally known as Kenny Rogers Showboat Branson Belle.

=== Lodging ===
Name	Location	Year opened	Year acquired	Notes
Dollywood Cabins	Pigeon Forge	2010		Cabin style lodging in the Great Smoky Mountains
Dollywood's DreamMore Resort	Pigeon Forge	2015		Full Service resort and spa
Dollywood's Heartsong Lodge and Resort	Pigeon Forge	2023		Full Service resort and convention center
Silver Dollar City campground	Branson			Log cabins and campground
The Lodge & Spa at Callaway Gardens	Pine Mountain	2006	2022	Full Service resort and spa, conference & golf
Adventureland Campground	Altoona, Iowa	1973	2025	Acquired from Parques Reunidos.
Adventureland Inn	Altoona, Iowa	1973	2025	Acquired from Parques Reunidos. Parques Reunidos announced one week before the acquisition announcement that the hotel would not reopen. The hotel is currently used as employee housing.
Dutch Wonderland Inn	Lancaster, Pennsylvania	2020	2025	Acquired from Parques Reunidos.
Flamingo Motel & Suites	Wisconsin Dells, Wisconsin		2025	Acquired from Parques Reunidos. Closed at the end of the 2019 season and never reopened.
Lake Compounce Campground	Bristol, Connecticut	2010	2025	Acquired from Parques Reunidos.
Old Mill Stream Campground	Lancaster, Pennsylvania	2001	2025	Acquired from Parques Reunidos.
Dolly Parton's SongTeller Hotel	Nashville	2026		Urban hotel and museum

=== Sports Entertainment Franchise ===
Name	Location	Year opened	Year acquired	Notes
Harlem Globetrotters International Inc.	Peachtree Corners, GA	1926	2013	Exhibition basketball team

== The Dollywood Company ==
The Herschends extended their brand in 1976 upon purchasing a small tourist attraction in Pigeon Forge, Tennessee, called Goldrush Junction. The following year the attraction was renamed Silver Dollar City Tennessee as part of a development plan to transform the property into a theme park patterned after the original Silver Dollar City in Branson. For the Pigeon Forge park, the Ozark Mountains theme of the original Silver Dollar City was slightly reworked to represent the Great Smoky Mountains and Appalachia culture instead, fitting the location in the foothills of the Smokies.

In 1986, singer and actress Dolly Parton, who grew up near Pigeon Forge, became a co-owner, and the park's name was changed to Dollywood, reflecting her involvement. At this point, the Pigeon Forge park was branched off into a separate division of HFE called The Dollywood Company, which oversees all the properties that Dolly Parton has interest in.

Along with the Herschend family, Dolly Parton co-owned the Dolly Parton's Stampede (formerly Dixie Stampede) dinner attraction chain, which has locations in Pigeon Forge (opened 1988), Myrtle Beach (1992), and Branson (1995). A location in Orlando opened in 2003 and closed in early 2008.

In 2001, a new water park was opened adjacent to the Dollywood theme park called Dollywood's Splash Country.

== Callaway Gardens ==
Former Herschend employee William R. "Bill" Doyle, III was hired as the President & CEO of Callaway Gardens on June 5, 2015.

Doyle resigned effective July 8, 2019 after four years on the job to return to Herschend. He continued as a trustee of the Ida Cason Callaway Foundation and assisted in the search for a new president.

Herschend began managing Callaway Gardens in 2020. Two years later, they purchased most of the assets, including The Lodge & Spa, Golf: Lake View Course & Mountain View Course and conference center. Herschend will lease and manage the Ida Cason Callaway Foundation's Virginia Hand Callaway Discovery Center, Cecil B. Day Butterfly Center, Ida Cason Memorial Chapel and the gardens. Callaway had about 500 employees.

== Past properties ==
HFE built several water parks in the 1980s which have since sold to other companies such as Wet 'n Wild, and White Water Bay. White Water Branson, built in 1980, was the forerunner and is still owned by HFE; while the White Water parks in Oklahoma City (1981), Grand Prairie, Texas (1982), Garland, Texas (1982) and Atlanta (1983) have been sold.

The 4,000 seat Grand Palace Theatre opened in 1992 by the Herschends. The theatre was co-owned by singer Kenny Rogers. Along with Rogers headliners were Glen Campbell, Louise Mandrell and Barbara Mandrell. In 1994 HFE entered into a ten-year contract with Radio City Entertainment. The Grand Palace Theatre would be the first to host the Radio City Christmas Spectacular starring the Rockettes outside of New York City's Radio City Music Hall. The shows were successful and led to Radio City Entertainment launching tours of their shows in other cities throughout the United States.

HFE built the $10 million Grand Village Shops with Kenny Rogers adjacent to The Grand Palace Theatre in 1993. Ozark wares and English bone china filled the twenty six New Orleans themed shops. HFE later bought out entertainer Kenny Rogers and sold The Grand Palace in 1996 and The Grand Village in 2005.

American Adventures, a children's theme park opened alongside White Water Atlanta. The park was sold to Six Flags in 1999.

In 1994, The Dollywood Company constructed a large music theatre in Pigeon Forge called Music Mansion. Headlined by James Rogers, the highly successful theatre was operated by HFE until 2001, when it was sold to Anita Bryant. In 2005 the theatre was sold again and converted to a WonderWorks location. A Music Mansion Theatre was planned for Myrtle Beach, but never materialized.

In 2003 the Dollywood Company opened a new Dixie Stampede location in Orlando, Florida along Interstate 4. The location operated until early 2008, when the property was sold to Simon Property Group for an undisclosed amount. The building was torn down, and an extension of the Orlando Vineland Premium Outlets was built on the land. HFE has plans to build another Dixie Stampede in the region at some point, though specific plans have not been disclosed.

In 2004 HFE purchased the Hawaiian Falls water parks located in Dallas, Garland and The Colony, Texas. In 2006 all three parks were sold.

In 2004 HFE purchased Ride the Ducks. In 2017, HFE sold Ride the Ducks to Ripley Entertainment who shut the operations down in 2018 after the deadly sinking in Branson.

Celebration City in Branson was acquired by them in 2002 and closed on October 25, 2008.

Herschend also briefly operated Six Flags Darien Lake from 2012 to 2014. The company owned Raging Waters, Wet 'n Wild Emerald Pointe, Castle Park and two Boomers parks for a few months before selling to Lucky Strike Entertainment.
