= Raeanne Presley =

American politician

Mayor of Branson, Missouri
- In office April 2007 – April 2015
- Preceded by: Lou Schaeffer
- Succeeded by: Karen Best

Personal details
- Party: Republican
- Spouse: Steve Presley
- Occupation: Politician
- Website: www.raeannepresley.com

Raeanne Presley is an American politician of the Republican Party, having served four terms as mayor of Branson, Missouri. Presley had previously served as an alderman in Branson, and had lost an election for mayor to Lou Schaeffer in the mid-1990s. She was defeated for re-election in 2015 by Karen Best.

== Career ==
Before serving as mayor, Presley was the Chairman of the Missouri Tourism Commission and had served on several community boards including as chairman of the Board of Directors of Skaggs Community Hospital, Board of Trustees of the Springfield-Branson National Airport, and the Branson Lakes Area Chamber of Commerce. She served as a Branson City Council Alderman for 10 years.

Presley was first elected mayor of Branson in 2007, then re-elected in 2009, 2011, and 2013. She has also served in leadership positions with the Missouri Tourism Commission, Cox Health Center Branson, Springfield/Branson National Airport, Council of Churches of the Ozarks, Ozarks Technical Community College Foundation, and Community Partnership of the Ozarks.

Raeanne Presley is the co-owner of Branson Visitor TV and Presley's Country Jubilee Theater, billed as the first live performance theater on the Branson Strip. She is a Certified Tour Professional (NTA designation) and a Certified Travel Industry Specialist (ABA designation).

Presley has been compared in the press with Sarah Palin due to her similar political start as a mayor.

Presley cameoed in a Virgin Atlantic 2015 April Fools prank about the company moving to Branson, Missouri.

== Personal life ==
Presley has lived in Branson, Missouri, since 1968. She graduated from Branson High School as High School Valedictorian in 1975.

She is married to Steve Presley and has three children, all of whom work in the Presley Music Theater as performers.
