= Branson Scenic Railway =

Heritage railroad in Branson, Missouri

Coordinates: 36°38′37″N 93°12′54″W

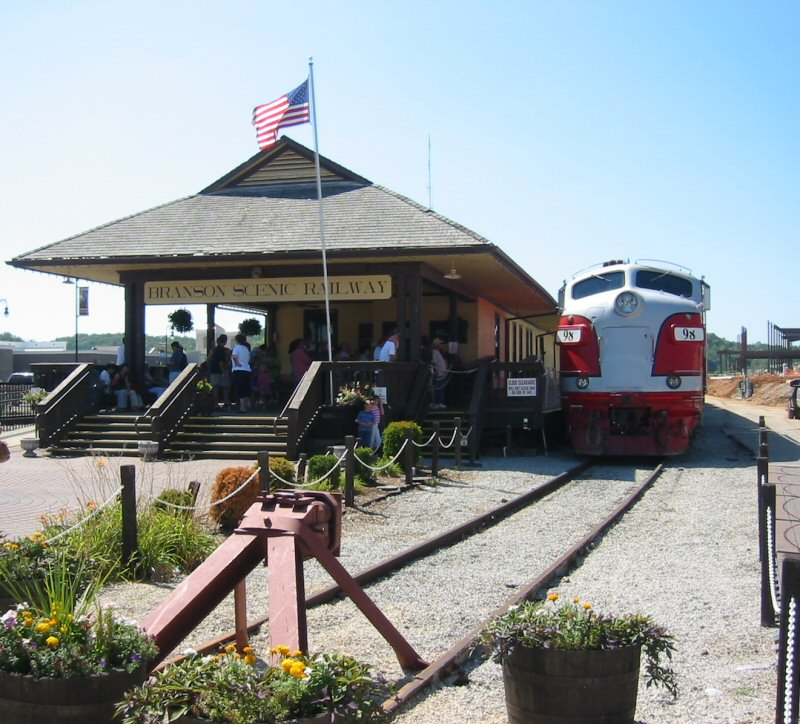
- Passengers boarding the train at the depot in downtown Branson

Overview
- Parent company: American Heritage Railways
- Headquarters: Branson, Missouri
- Reporting mark: BSRX
- Locale: Branson, Missouri
- Dates of operation: 1993–present
- Predecessor: White River Railway; Missouri Pacific

Technical
- Track gauge: 4 ft 8 1/2 in (1,435 mm) standard gauge
- Length: 40 miles (64 km)

Other
- Website: bransontrain.com

The Branson Scenic Railway (reporting mark BSRX) is a heritage railroad located in Branson, Missouri.

As the underlying rail lines are owned by the Missouri and Northern Arkansas Railroad (MNA) and are still in use as an active railroad, MNA traffic determines whether a particular trip will operate northbound from Branson to Galena, Missouri, or southbound from Branson to the Barren Fork Trestle in Arkansas.

== History ==
The railroad was originally built as the White River Railway between January 1902 and December 29, 1905. Because of the rugged terrain of the Ozarks, a number of trestles and tunnels were required in order to create a level railroad grade. The lines later became part of the Missouri Pacific Railroad, and in 1992 were sold to MNA. In 1993, the Branson Scenic Railway was formed by Alan Kamp, Illa Kamp, and Tom Johnson through a lease agreement with the Missouri and Northern Arkansas Railroad, the railway runs excursions from March through December.

The Ozark Zephyr, Branson Scenic Railway's historic zephyr train, departs from an old depot in downtown Branson and operates in the scenic Ozark Mountains for an approximate 40-mile (64 km) round trip.

In early 2024, Branson Scenic Railway was sold to American Heritage Railways, a new operator with intentions to expand the railway's offerings and operations. This was finalized as Alan Kamp, Illa Kamp and Thomas Johnson, the original founders and owners of the railway, decided to retire. American Heritage Railways is based in Durango, Colorado and owns the Durango and Silverton Narrow Gauge Railroad based in Colorado and the Great Smoky Mountains Railroad based in North Carolina.

== Locomotives ==
Locomotive details
Number	Image	Type	Model	Builder	Built	Status
98		Diesel	F9PH	Electro-Motive Diesel	1951	Operational
99		Diesel	GP30	Electro-Motive Diesel	1962	Out of Service (Repairs)
3460		Diesel	SD40-2	Electro-Motive Diesel	1976	Operational
3133		Diesel	GP50	Electro-Motive Diesel	1985	Operational
9120		Diesel	GP10	Electro-Motive Diesel	1955/Rebuilt	Operational
