= Branson, Missouri =

- City
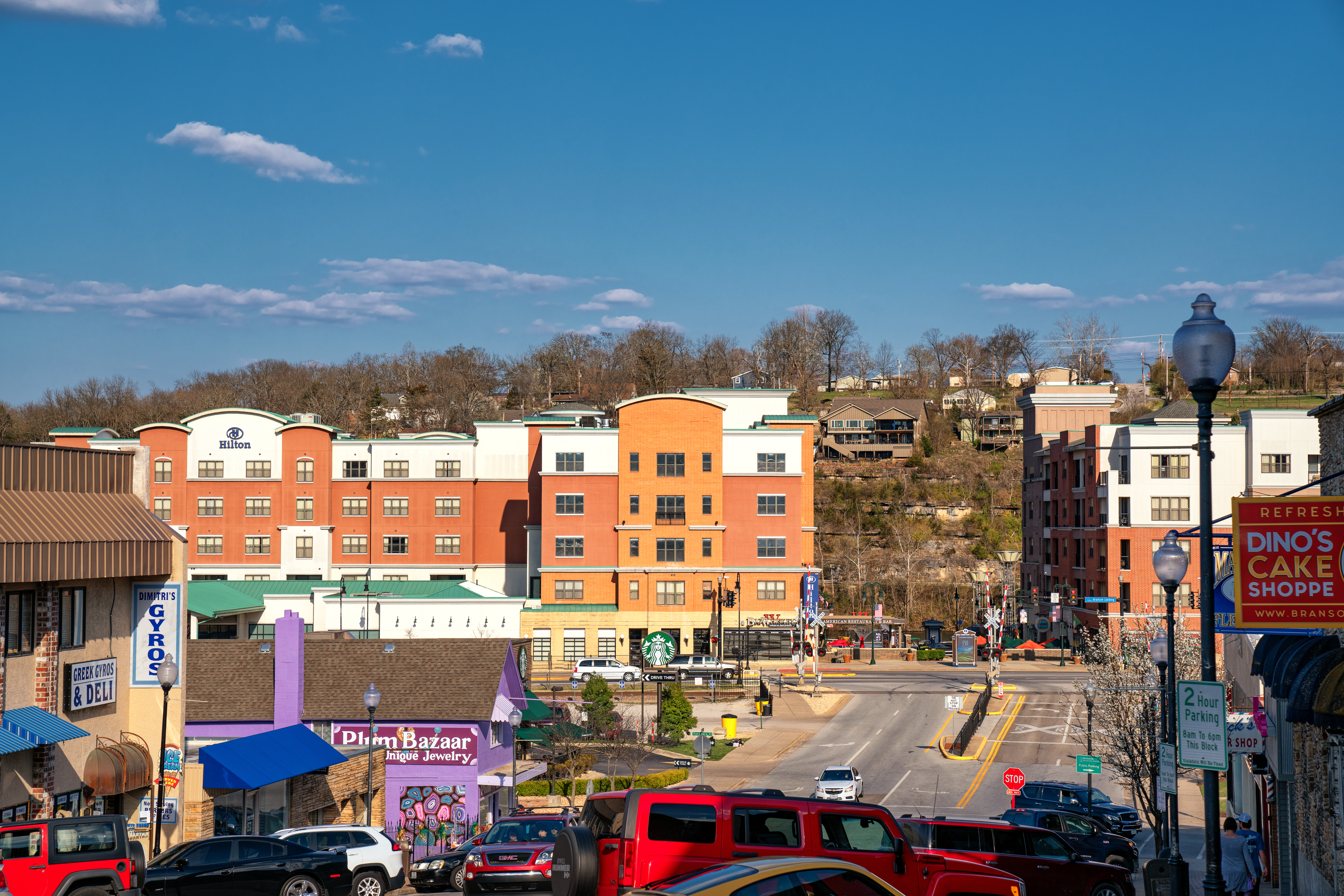
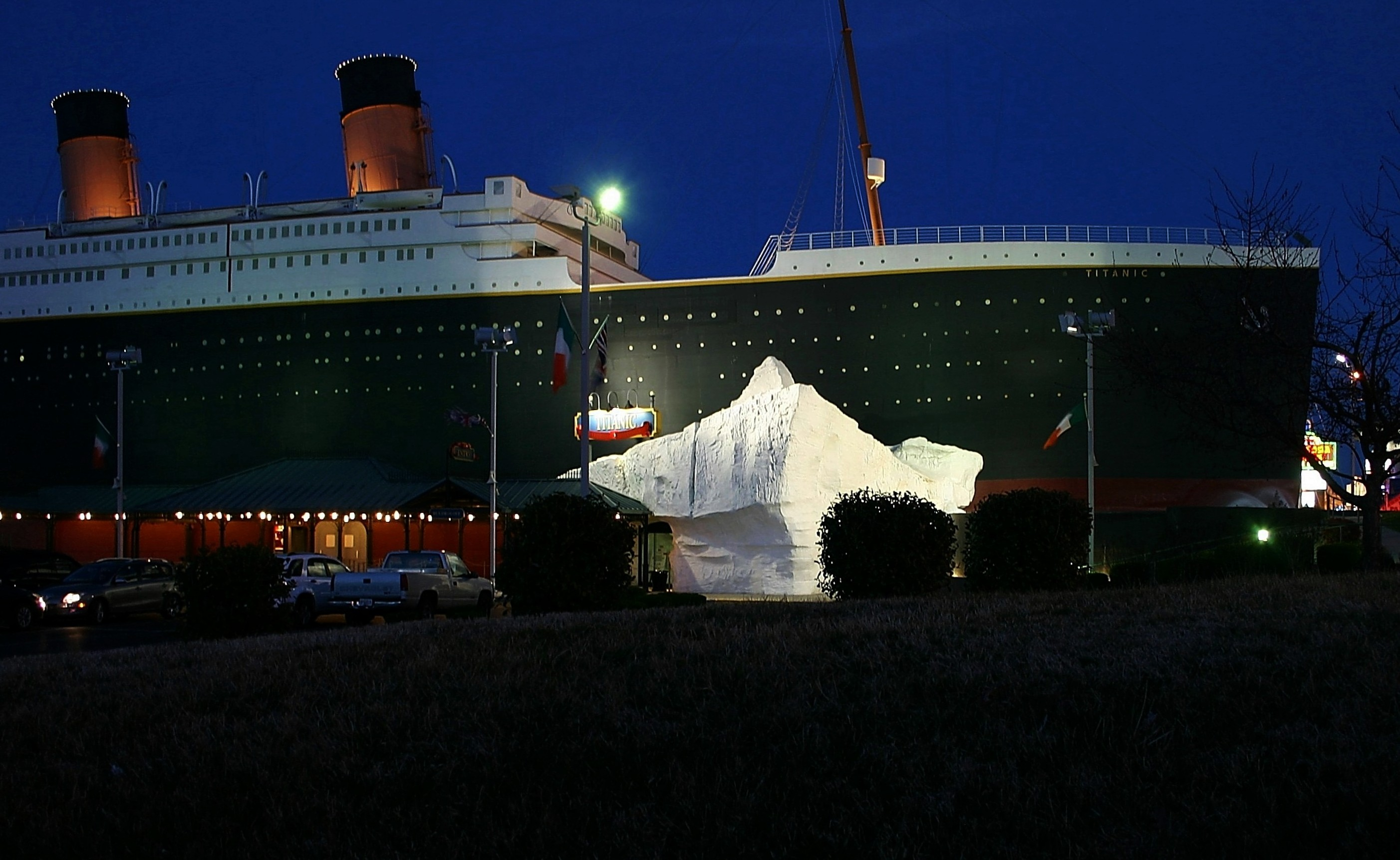
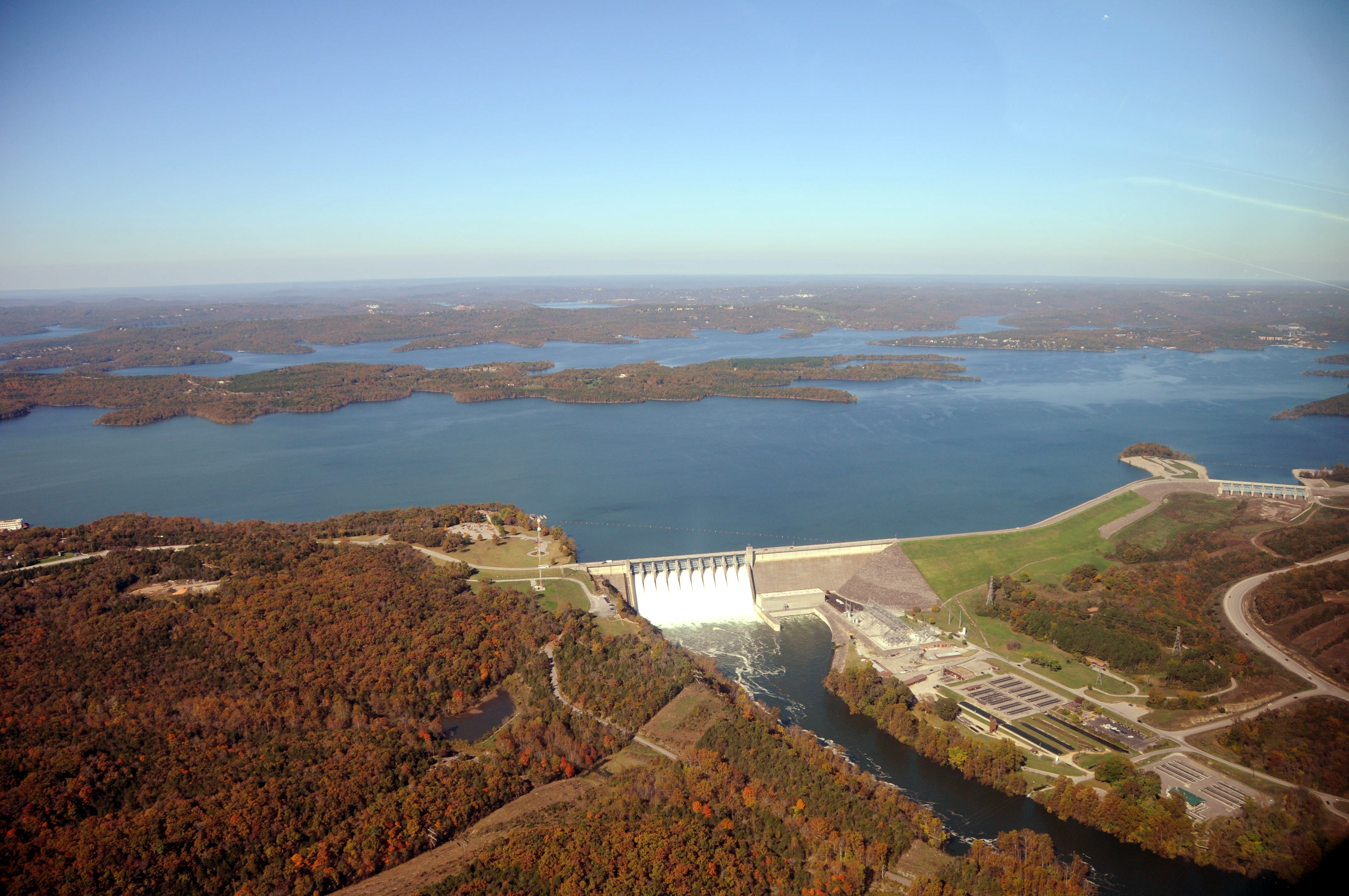
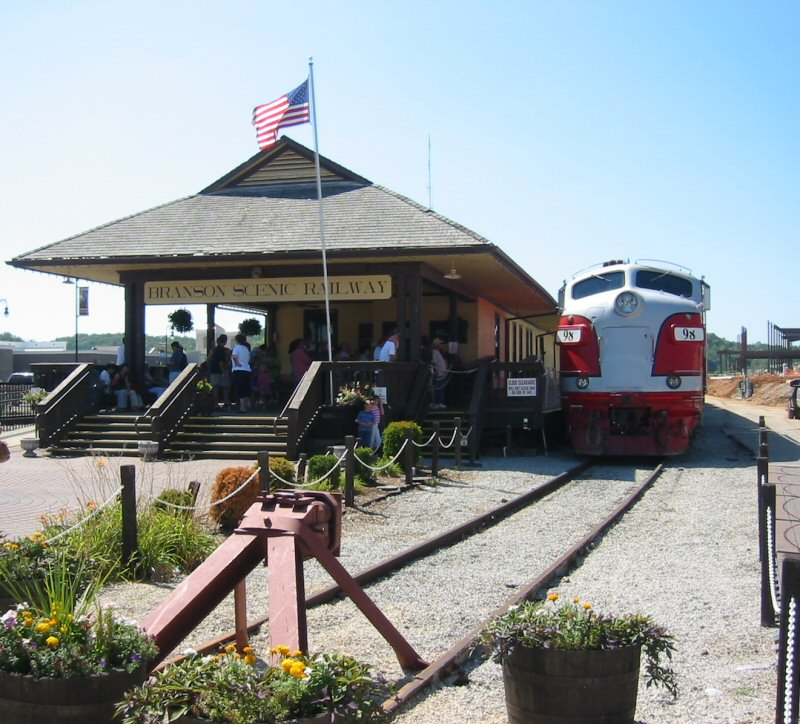
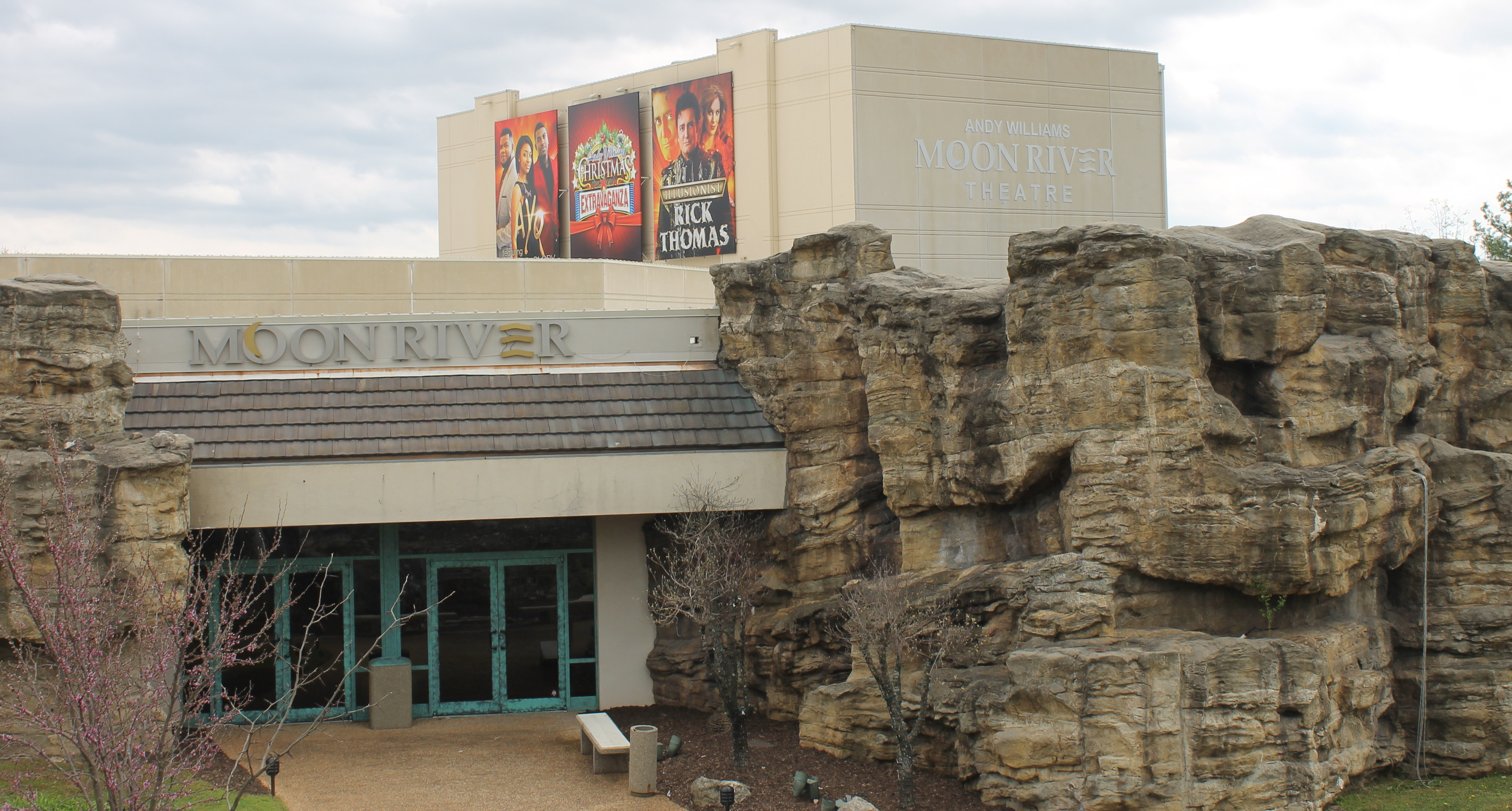
- Downtown Branson Titanic Museum Table Rock Lake Branson Scenic Railway Moon River Theatre

- Flag
- Nickname: Live Entertainment Capital of the World
- Interactive map of Branson, Missouri
- Coordinates: 36.612287°N 93.291812°W
- Country: United States
- State: Missouri
- Counties: Taney, Stone
- Founded: 1882
- Incorporated: April 1, 1912
- Named for: Reuben Branson

Government
  - Type: Mayor–council
  - Mayor: Larry Milton

Area
  - City: 21.469 sq mi (55.604 km^{2})
  - Land: 21.343 sq mi (55.279 km^{2})
  - Water: 0.125 sq mi (0.325 km^{2}) 0.59%
- Elevation: 965 ft (294 m)

Population (2020)
  - City: 12,638
  - Estimate (2024): 12,869
  - Density: 592.13/sq mi (228.62/km^{2})
  - Urban: 28,640
  - Metro: 56,744
- Time zone: UTC−6 (Central (CST))
  - Summer (DST): UTC−5 (CDT)
- ZIP Codes: 65615, 65616
- Area code: 417
- FIPS code: 29-07966
- GNIS feature ID: 2394242
- Website: bransonmo.gov

Branson is a resort city in the U.S. state of Missouri. Most of the city is situated in Taney County, with a small portion in the west extending into Stone County. Branson is in the Ozark Mountains. The community was named after Reuben Branson, postmaster and operator of a general store in the area in the 1880s. The population was 12,638 at the 2020 census, which constitutes nearly one fourth of the Taney County population.

Branson has long been a popular destination for vacationers from Missouri and around the country. The collection of entertainment theaters along 76 Country Boulevard (and to a lesser extent along Shepherd of the Hills Expressway), including Dolly Parton's Stampede, has increased Branson's popularity as a tourist destination. Branson is the site of the Branson Cross, the largest cross monument in North America.

== History ==
In 1882, Reuben Branson (born 1853) opened a general store and post office in the area. Branson was formally incorporated on April 1, 1912, and construction of the Powersite Dam nearby on the White River which would form Lake Taneycomo was completed.

In 1894, William Henry Lynch bought Marble Cave (renamed "Marvel Cave") and began charging visitors to tour it. Hugo and Mary Herschend leased the cave for 99 years in 1950 and began hosting square dances in it. The Herschend Family modernized the cave with electricity and concrete staircases, and in 1960 the Herschends opened Silver Dollar City, a recreation of a frontier town that featured five shops, a church, and a log cabin, with actors that reenacted the feud between the Hatfields and the McCoys.

=== Growth as a cultural attraction ===
Harold Bell Wright published his novel about the Ozarks, The Shepherd of the Hills, in 1907. The novel became an international best seller, making Wright the first millionaire author and established Branson and Southwest Missouri as a tourist destination. The Old Mill Theater began its first outdoor production based on the novel in 1960. The show, known as The Shepherd of the Hills Outdoor Drama, continued in its 61st season for 2021. The historic farm is also the home of Inspiration Tower, the Shepherd of the Hills Adventure Park as well as numerous other shows and attractions.

The Harold Bell Wright Museum is located within The World's Largest Toy Museum complex. Mayor of Branson for 12 years and entrepreneur Jim Owen built the first theater in 1934 on Commercial Street, originally called "The Hillbilly Theater", which began to attract people from far and wide to tour the area. 1959 saw the completion of Table Rock Dam on the White River, which created Table Rock Lake. In 1959, the Mabe Brothers started a band that, in 1961, would become the first music show in Branson. Taking their name from the parts they played in the Shepherd of the Hills Outdoor Drama, they became known as the Baldknobber Hillbilly Jamboree.

In 1962, Paul Henning, inspired by a Boy Scout camping trip to the Ozarks, created The Beverly Hillbillies, which ran as a CBS television sitcom until 1971. Henning later donated 1,534 acres (6.21 km^{2}) for the Ruth and Paul Henning Conservation Area near Branson. He also donated the modified 1921 Oldsmobile truck used as the vehicle in the series to the College of the Ozarks, where it is on display in the Ralph Foster Museum.

The Presley family became the first to move their show (Presleys' Country Jubilee) to Highway 76 in 1967, followed a year later by the Baldknobbers. Eventually Branson would have more than 50 theaters, most of them located on Highway 76.

Also in 1983, the 7,500-seat Swiss Villa Amphitheatre opened in Lampe, southwest of Branson. The outdoor amphitheater brought in acts like Def Leppard, Lynyrd Skynyrd, REO Speedwagon, Steppenwolf, and Ozzy Osbourne. Closing in the early 2000s, it reopened in 2010 as the Black Oak Mountain Amphitheater. Closing suddenly in 2013, it went unused until relaunching live music events in 2021.

In 1987, Boxcar Willie became the first internationally known entertainer to purchase a theater in Branson and have a permanent performance schedule there.

In 1989, Shoji Tabuchi opened his first theater in Branson (converting the Ozarks Auto Museum on West 76 Highway into a theater). He then built a new theater on Shepherd of the Hills Expressway in 1990, while Mel Tillis moved into Tabuchi's old theater. In 1990-1991 several nationally known stars such as Jim Stafford, Ray Stevens, Mickey Gilley, and Moe Bandy opened their own theaters. Along with these national stars, many home-grown shows also had theaters. The Lowe Family featured their show and hosted nationally known stars like Conway Twitty, Loretta Lynn, Vern Gosdin, Waylon Jennings, and others. 76 Music Hall (now known as the Grand Country Music Hall) became the first theater to have three different shows a day performing in different time slots. In 1991, local producer and entertainer Bob Nichols opened the first morning show and the following year, Buck Trent became the first nationally known star to star in a morning show.

The increasing number of theaters and other attractions opening in Branson drew the attention of 60 Minutes, which aired an episode about Branson on December 8, 1991, and called it the "live music capital of the entire universe".

Andy Williams built his theater in Branson, opening on May 1, 1992, calling it the Moon River Theatre. The Glen Campbell Goodtime Theatre opened in 1994, starring Glen along with his "Goodtime Band", daughter Debbie Campbell, the Matthew Dickens Dancers, and comedian ventriloquist Jim Barber. Also headlining their own theaters were Tony Orlando (Yellow Ribbon Theater) and Bobby Vinton (Blue Velvet Theater). In 1998, the Acrobats of China arrived in Branson, making them one of the first international shows to call Branson home. They opened their theatre, the New Shanghai Theatre, in 2005. In 2006, Dick Clark's American Bandstand Theatre opened and is the most recent new theater to be built on Route 76. Branson has continued to add theaters (the most recent being the Sight & Sound Theatres) and shows; it refers to itself as "the live music show capital of the world".

=== 2012 tornado ===
Just after 1 a.m. on February 29, 2012, the city of Branson sustained damage from an EF2 tornado in the 2012 Leap Day tornado outbreak. 47 injuries were reported, most being cuts and bruises, with one person sustaining critical injuries after a roof collapse. Most of the tourist attractions and businesses were undamaged and remained open after the storm, although at least 37 buildings were destroyed within Branson and $15 million (2012 USD) in damages was inflicted upon the city. As of November 2012, most of the damage was repaired. Mary Jane Rice, a spokeswoman for Branson Area Chamber of Commerce, told the AP that February is generally a slow time for business and most of the damage would be cleaned up in the next few days.

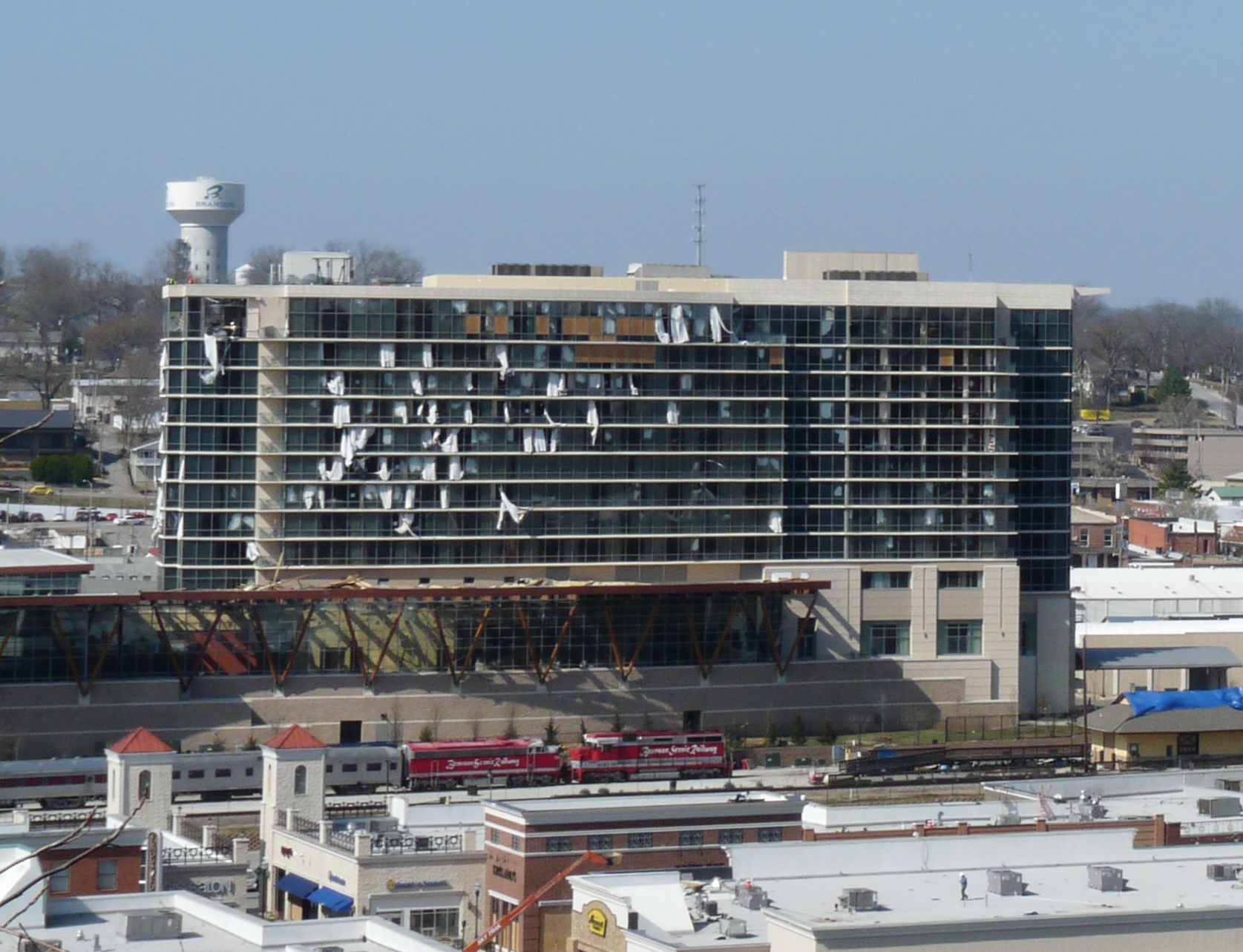
A photo of the Hilton Convention Center Hotel in Branson, which suffered significant damage.

The tornado followed a 22-mile-long (35 km) path from Kimberling City, Missouri, across Table Rock Lake and along the entertainment strip 76 Country Boulevard before hitting the downtown area where it blew out or cracked windows in 219 of the hotel rooms in the 12-story/295 room Hilton Branson Convention Center Hotel. The tornado extensively damaged three of Branson's 50-plus theatres — (Americana Theater, Branson Variety Theater and Dick Clark's American Bandstand Theater) and there was damage to portions of Branson Landing on Lake Taneycomo and the Veterans Memorial Museum. Vehicles at the Ride the Ducks water/land attraction were flipped over, but officials said they were not damaged enough to be put out of service.

== Attractions and events ==
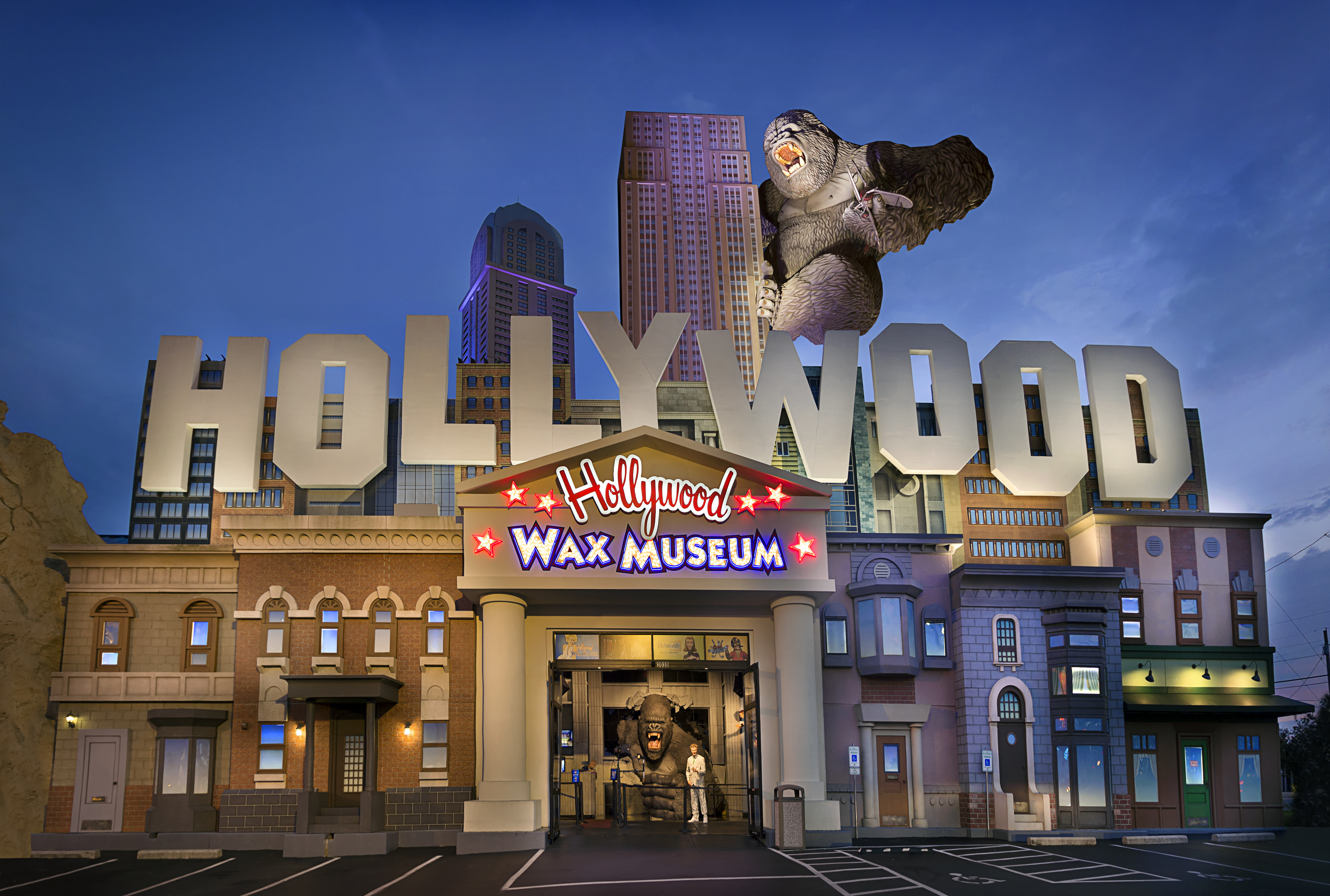
Hollywood Wax Museum - Branson MO

Branson's local attractions include Aquarium at the Boardwalk, Beyond The Lens!, Hollywood Wax Museum Branson, Wonderworks, Silver Dollar City, White Water, Ripley's Super Fun Zone, Mount Pleasant Winery, Dolly Parton's Stampede, helicopter rides, ziplines, cave tours, go-karts, mini golf, and more. Ripley's Odditorium is housed in a building that has been made to look as if it is cracked wide open by an earthquake or other disaster, while the Titanic Museum is a half-scale replica of the famous ship and iceberg.

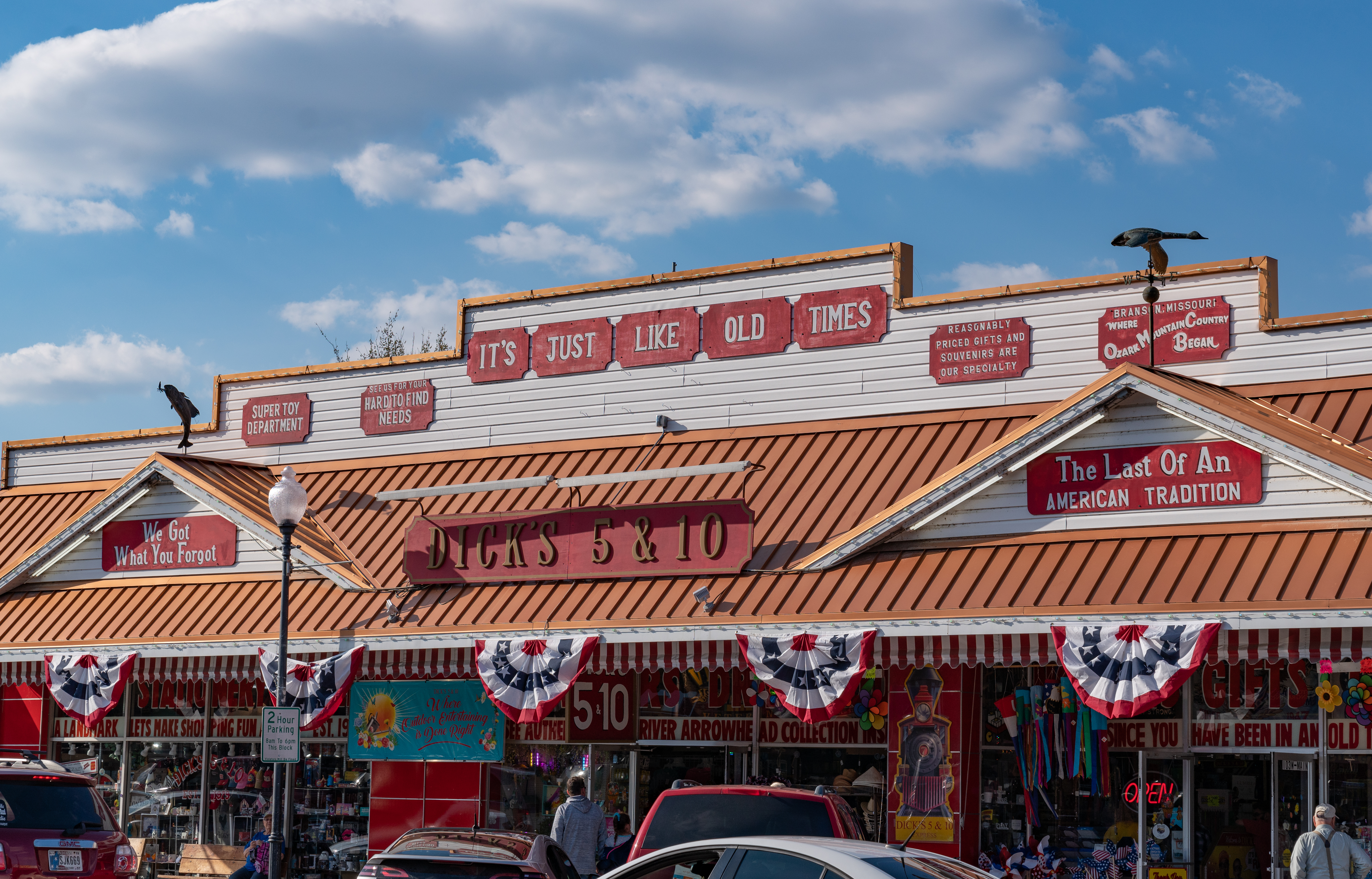
Dick's 5 & 10, a gift and souvenir shop

Branson Landing opened in the summer of 2006 on the Lake Taneycomo waterfront in downtown Branson. The lakefront project includes retail space with Bass Pro Shops and Belk as anchors in an outdoor shopping mall of stores and restaurants. It also features a scenic boardwalk along the lakefront with the Branson Landing Fountains at the heart of the property as well as a Hilton Hotel. Branson Landing has been known to host summer concerts and other special events throughout the year. The convention center, situated between Branson Landing and Historic Downtown Branson, opened September 7, 2007. The Branson Scenic Railway is located in the old depot, across from Branson Landing. There is also a dinosaur themed hotel called Rocky's Retreat.

Due to Branson being known for family-oriented tourism, casino gambling is frowned upon and it does not exist in this area. However, Branson's neighboring cities do offer those types of entertainments for those who enjoy gambling.

Finally, Branson's ferris wheel, moved from Chicago's Navy Pier in 2016, provides a scenic view of the Ozarks from 150 feet.

== Geography ==
The White River/Lake Taneycomo forms a bend on the east and southern side of the city. According to the United States Census Bureau, the city has a total area of 21.469 square miles (55.60 km^{2}), of which 21.343 square miles (55.28 km^{2}) is land and 0.126 square miles (0.33 km^{2}) (0.59%) is water.

=== Climate ===
Branson has a humid subtropical climate (Cfa) with characteristics of a continental climate. The hardiness zone is 7a.

Climate data for Branson, Missouri (1991−2020 normals)
| Month | Jan | Feb | Mar | Apr | May | Jun | Jul | Aug | Sep | Oct | Nov | Dec | Year |
|---|---|---|---|---|---|---|---|---|---|---|---|---|---|
| Record high °F (°C) | 80 (27) | 87 (31) | 90 (32) | 96 (36) | 99 (37) | 105 (41) | 116 (47) | 108 (42) | 106 (41) | 96 (36) | 90 (32) | 81 (27) | 116 (47) |
| Mean daily maximum °F (°C) | 43.2 (6.2) | 49.2 (9.6) | 58.4 (14.7) | 67.6 (19.8) | 75.1 (23.9) | 83.9 (28.8) | 88.1 (31.2) | 88.0 (31.1) | 80.2 (26.8) | 69.6 (20.9) | 57.6 (14.2) | 47.1 (8.4) | 67.3 (19.6) |
| Daily mean °F (°C) | 34.9 (1.6) | 39.4 (4.1) | 48.0 (8.9) | 57.2 (14.0) | 65.5 (18.6) | 73.9 (23.3) | 78.4 (25.8) | 77.6 (25.3) | 69.8 (21.0) | 59.1 (15.1) | 47.6 (8.7) | 38.7 (3.7) | 57.5 (14.2) |
| Mean daily minimum °F (°C) | 26.6 (−3.0) | 29.6 (−1.3) | 37.6 (3.1) | 46.8 (8.2) | 56.0 (13.3) | 63.9 (17.7) | 68.7 (20.4) | 67.1 (19.5) | 59.3 (15.2) | 48.7 (9.3) | 37.7 (3.2) | 30.3 (−0.9) | 47.7 (8.7) |
| Record low °F (°C) | −15 (−26) | −19 (−28) | 0 (−18) | 19 (−7) | 29 (−2) | 40 (4) | 48 (9) | 40 (4) | 30 (−1) | 22 (−6) | 6 (−14) | −12 (−24) | −19 (−28) |
| Average precipitation inches (mm) | 2.81 (71) | 2.91 (74) | 4.29 (109) | 4.77 (121) | 5.54 (141) | 3.87 (98) | 4.12 (105) | 4.15 (105) | 5.08 (129) | 3.86 (98) | 3.93 (100) | 3.00 (76) | 48.33 (1,228) |
| Average snowfall inches (cm) | 2.9 (7.4) | 2.6 (6.6) | 1.2 (3.0) | 0.0 (0.0) | 0.0 (0.0) | 0.0 (0.0) | 0.0 (0.0) | 0.0 (0.0) | 0.0 (0.0) | 0.0 (0.0) | 0.0 (0.0) | 1.7 (4.3) | 8.4 (21) |
Source 1:
Source 2:

== Demographics ==
Historical population
| Census | Pop. | Note | %± |
|---|---|---|---|
| 1920 | 598 | | — |
| 1930 | 958 | | 60.2% |
| 1940 | 1,011 | | 5.5% |
| 1950 | 1,314 | | 30.0% |
| 1960 | 1,887 | | 43.6% |
| 1970 | 2,175 | | 15.3% |
| 1980 | 2,550 | | 17.2% |
| 1990 | 3,706 | | 45.3% |
| 2000 | 6,050 | | 63.2% |
| 2010 | 10,520 | | 73.9% |
| 2020 | 12,638 | | 20.1% |
| 2024 (est.) | 12,869 | | 1.8% |
U.S. Decennial Census; 2020 Census

The Branson Micropolitan Statistical Area encompasses and is coterminous with Taney County.

=== Racial and ethnic composition ===
Branson, Missouri – racial and ethnic composition Note: the US Census treats Hispanic/Latino as an ethnic category. This table excludes Latinos from the racial categories and assigns them to a separate category. Hispanics/Latinos may be of any race.
| Race / ethnicity (NH = non-Hispanic) | Pop. 1990 | Pop. 2000 | Pop. 2010 | Pop. 2020 | % 1990 | % 2000 | % 2010 | % 2020 |
|---|---|---|---|---|---|---|---|---|
| White alone (NH) | 3,620 | 5,569 | 8,956 | 9,832 | 97.68% | 92.05% | 85.13% | 77.80% |
| Black or African American alone (NH) | 2 | 45 | 184 | 306 | 0.05% | 0.74% | 1.75% | 2.42% |
| Native American or Alaska Native alone (NH) | 10 | 51 | 80 | 88 | 0.27% | 0.84% | 0.76% | 0.70% |
| Asian alone (NH) | 24 | 43 | 154 | 338 | 0.65% | 0.71% | 1.46% | 2.67% |
| Pacific Islander or Native Hawaiian alone (NH) | — | 2 | 13 | 8 | — | 0.03% | 0.12% | 0.06% |
| Other race alone (NH) | 0 | 5 | 147 | 45 | 0.00% | 0.08% | 0.13% | 0.36% |
| Mixed race or Multiracial (NH) | — | 77 | 191 | 674 | — | 1.27% | 1.82% | 5.33% |
| Hispanic or Latino (any race) | 50 | 258 | 928 | 1,347 | 1.35% | 4.26% | 8.82% | 10.66% |
| Total | 3,706 | 6,050 | 10,520 | 12,638 | 100.00% | 100.00% | 100.00% | 100.00% |

=== 2020 census ===
As of the 2020 census, there were 12,638 people in Branson. The median age was 44.1 years. 18.6% of residents were under the age of 18 and 25.0% were 65 years of age or older. For every 100 females, there were 89.9 males, and for every 100 females age 18 and over, there were 86.9 males age 18 and over.

97.7% of residents lived in urban areas, while 2.3% lived in rural areas.

There were 5,842 households in Branson, of which 21.5% had children under the age of 18 living in them. Of all households, 39.7% were married-couple households, 20.3% were households with a male householder and no spouse or partner present, and 32.4% were households with a female householder and no spouse or partner present. About 37.1% of all households were made up of individuals, and 16.2% had someone living alone who was 65 years of age or older.

There were 8,591 housing units, of which 32.0% were vacant. The homeowner vacancy rate was 5.4% and the rental vacancy rate was 14.7%.

=== Demographic estimates ===
According to realtor website Zillow, the average price of a home as of September 30, 2025, in Branson is $246,076.

As of the 2023 American Community Survey, Branson has an average of 2.2 persons per household. The city has a median household income of $54,961. Approximately 19.0% of the city's population lives at or below the poverty line. Branson has an estimated 57.5% employment rate, with 29.4% of the population holding a bachelor's degree or higher and 91.2% holding a high school diploma.

The top five reported languages (people were allowed to report up to two languages, thus the figures will generally add to more than 100%) were English (_%), Spanish (_%), Indo-European (_%), Asian and Pacific Islander (_%), and Other (_%).

=== 2010 census ===
As of the 2010 census, there were 10,520 people, 4,688 households, 2,695 families residing in the city. The population density was 509.9 inhabitants per square mile (196.9/km^{2}). There were 8,599 housing units at an average density of 416.8 per square mile (160.9/km^{2}). The racial makeup of the city was 88.95% White, 1.97% African American, 0.87% Native American, 1.51% Asian, 0.12% Pacific Islander, 3.93% from some other races and 2.64% from two or more races. Hispanic or Latino people of any race were 8.82% of the population.

There were 4,688 households, of which 23.2% had children under the age of 18 living with them, 42.8% were married couples living together, 10.7% had a female householder with no husband present, 3.9% had a male householder with no wife present, and 42.5% were non-families. 32.8% of all households were made up of individuals, and 13.5% had someone living alone who was 65 years of age or older. The average household size was 2.20 and the average family size was 2.77.

The median age in the city was 41.2 years. 18.8% of residents were under the age of 18; 10.2% were between the ages of 18 and 24; 25.7% were from 25 to 44; 25.6% were from 45 to 64; and 19.6% were 65 years of age or older. The gender makeup of the city was 47.9% male and 52.1% female.

=== 2000 census ===
As of the 2000 census, there were 6,050 people, 2,701 households, 1,661 families residing in the city. The population density was 374.0 inhabitants per square mile (144.4/km^{2}). There were 3,366 housing units at an average density of 208.1 per square mile (80.3/km^{2}). The racial makeup of the city was 94.50% White, 0.84% African American, 0.86% Native American, 0.71% Asian, 0.03% Pacific Islander, 1.47% from some other races and 1.59% from two or more races. Hispanic or Latino people of any race were 4.26% of the population.

There were 2,701 households, out of which 24.3% had children under the age of 18 living with them, 48.9% were married couples living together, 9.4% had a female householder with no husband present, and 38.5% were non-families. 31.9% of all households were made up of individuals, and 14.1% had someone living alone who was 65 years of age or older. The average household size was 2.21 and the average family size was 2.76.

In the city, the population was spread out, with 20.3% under the age of 18, 8.2% from 18 to 24, 24.4% from 25 to 44, 27.0% from 45 to 64, and 20.2% who were 65 years of age or older. The median age was 43 years. For every 100 females, there were 86.7 males. For every 100 females age 18 and over, there were 83.2 males.

The median income for a household in the city was $31,997, and the median income for a family was $43,145. Males had a median income of $31,769 versus $21,223 for females. The per capita income for the city was $20,461. 12.1% of the population and 9.7% of families were below the poverty line. 15.6% of those under the age of 18 and 17.0% of those 65 and older were living below the poverty line.

== Education ==
Branson Public Schools covers the portions of Branson in Taney County. It operates four elementary schools, Branson Jr. High School and Branson High School.

The small portion of Branson in Stone County is within the Reeds Spring School District.

The town has a lending library, the Taneyhills Community Library.

== Notable people ==
- Boxcar Willie, country music singer
- Kim Boyce, gospel singer
- John Burkhalter, businessman
- Janet Dailey, author
- Barbara Fairchild, country and gospel singer
- Jack Hamilton, baseball player
- Hughes Family, family music group
- Dino Kartsonakis, pianist
- Duane Laflin, award-winning magician
- The Lennon Sisters, singers
- Tony Orlando, popular music singer
- The Petersens, bluegrass family band
- Raeanne Presley, mayor 2007-2015
- S. Fred Prince, scientific and botanical illustrator
- Yakov Smirnoff, Ukrainian comedian
- Jim Stafford, comedian, singer, guitarist
- Ray Stevens, country/pop singer, comedian
- Shoji Tabuchi, country music fiddler and singer
- Andy Williams, popular music singer
- Barry Williams, singer and actor

== Media ==
- Branson Tri-Lakes News – A twice-weekly newspaper that traces its origins back more than 100 years to the oldest publications in the Branson area.

== Healthcare ==
Branson is served by the 165 bed full-service hospital and emergency department Cox Regional Medical Center and the Mercy Health System multi-specialty clinic.

== Transportation ==
=== Highways ===
U.S. Route 65 runs north and south, connecting Branson to Springfield to the north, and Little Rock to the south. Missouri Route 76 ran through Branson. In 2020, Route 76 was rerouted onto the existing Ozark Mountain Highroad replacing Route 465. The old alignment now forms 76 Country Boulevard.

=== Air ===
Branson is served primarily by Branson Airport, the closest commercial airport, which opened in May 2009. It is the largest privately owned commercial airport in the United States. Over the years, the airport has had on-again off-again service from carriers such as AirTran, Sun Country, and Frontier.

The two closest commercial airports to Branson with more extensive airline service are the Springfield-Branson National Airport (SGF) located in Springfield, Missouri, which is about 50 miles from Branson, and Northwest Arkansas National Airport (XNA), in Bentonville, Arkansas, which is about 100 miles from Branson. Between these two airports, service is offered to cities such as Chicago, Dallas, Houston, Atlanta, and Denver which allows connections to other cities.

M. Graham Clark Field in Branson is a general aviation airport, which serves mainly single engine aircraft.

=== Rail ===
Branson is served by the Missouri & Northern Arkansas Railroad (MNA), owned by shortline holding company Genesee & Wyoming. The MNA is an important link between Kansas City, Missouri, and Newport, Arkansas. The Branson Scenic Railway operates round-trip sightseeing trains out of Branson through a lease agreement with the MNA. The trackage used was constructed in the 1900s by the St. Louis, Iron Mountain & Southern Railway, later absorbed by the Missouri Pacific.
