= White Water Branson =

Commercial recreational water park in the Ozarks

White Water Branson Missouri
- Interactive map of White Water Branson Missouri
- Slogan: Beach Within Reach
- Location: Branson, Missouri, United States
- Coordinates: 36.64396°N 93.29957°W
- Owner: Herschend
- Opened: 1980
- Operating season: May - September
- Pools: 2 pools
- Water slides: 17 water slides
- Children's areas: 2 children's areas
- Website: https://www.silverdollarcity.com/white-water Official Website]

White Water Branson is a 13-acre commercial recreational water park located in Branson, in southwestern Missouri. It features a wave pool for swimming, water rides, private poolside cabana rentals, dining and shopping. It is open seasonally from May to September. Admission is per-person per-day with some package rates.

== History ==
When it opened in May 1980, the park was intended to simulate a beachside landing, featuring a wave pool and public and private cabanas. The park has been expanded over the years by incorporating large water rides and retail shopping and eating establishments.

== See also ==
- Herschend, the corporate parent of White Water Branson
