= James Mason Owen =

American politician

James Mason Owen (November 11, 1903 – July 12, 1972) served as mayor of Branson, Missouri, for 12 years. Jim Owen was an advertising manager for a Jefferson City newspaper before he came to the Ozarks in 1933 on a visit to Branson. He never left. Before he died in 1972, he had owned a drug store, movie theater and an auto dealership. He was president of a bank and wrote a fishing column for the Arkansas Gazette in Little Rock, Arkansas. In addition, he owned champion fox hounds and bird dogs, produced his own brand of dog food, and owned a large dairy.

But Jim Owen became known for his other business venture—he set up the largest and most successful Ozark float fishing operation of that day. His success sparked national attention, giving area tourism a big boost.

Jim Owen also authored a book entitled Jim Owen's Hillbilly Humor, being the subject of articles in Look, Life, and The Saturday Evening Post where Jim shared his hilarious and heartwarming stories of life in the Ozarks.
