= Talking Rocks Cavern =

Cave in Missouri, United States

Coordinates: 36°40′46″N 93°22′41″W

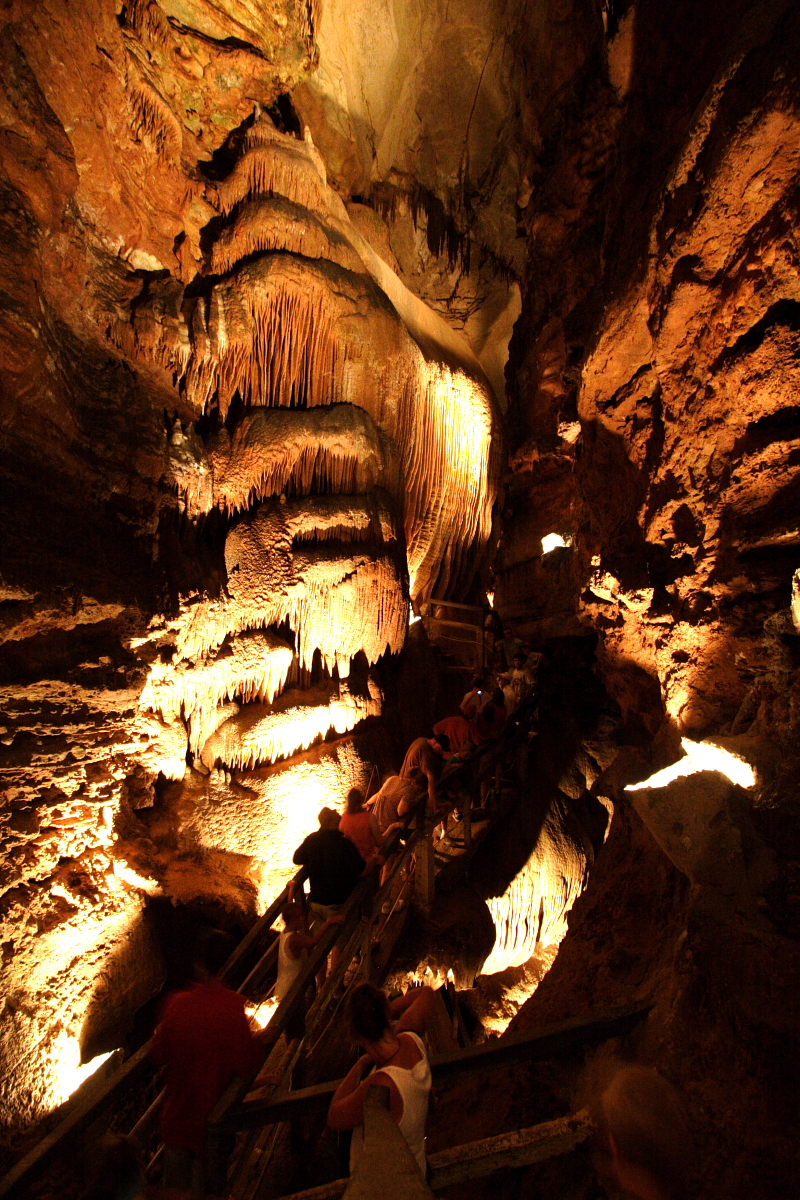
Talking Rocks Cavern

Talking Rocks Cavern (originally called Fairy Cave) is a cavern system located in Stone County, just west of Reeds Spring, in Branson West, in the U.S. state of Missouri. It is privately owned by Herschend, and operated by Adventure Creations Inc., as a public entertainment/educational attraction.

Guided cave tours are offered at regular intervals throughout each day. Tours take approximately one hour and lead to the floor of the cave, by way of 150 steps going down and 115 steps coming up. There are numerous formations to be viewed up close, including "cave bacon", "curtain", stalagmites, and stalactites. The vertical nature of the cave allows the growth of a formation called "The Cathedral", which is a flowstone and drapery mineral deposit that is approximately 90' tall, and 50' in diameter. The temperature in the cave remains an average 63 degrees throughout the year.

The entrance to the cave is accessed through an entrance inside the Rock and Gift Shop. As there is no outside access, there are no bats living in this cave. There are other living creatures that typically are found in caves, including cave salamanders. Talking Rocks Cavern is considered a living cave, because with the presence of water, the formations continue to grow.

During extremely rainy weather, the cave may be wetter than usual. It rarely floods or interrupts tours.

There are many activities offered at this property, some of them are free. There is an indoor and an outdoor SpeleoBox crawl maze that simulates crawling through a cave. There is a modern children's play area, featuring a large tube slide. There is an oversized outdoor Checkerboard. A 9-hole miniature golf course is available and gemstone sluicing is popular, as well as two nature trails that lead to a 100' lookout tower that offers a panoramic view of the Ozark countryside. The Rock and Gift Shop offers a wide variety of gemstones, fossils, and gift items.

School and Church groups are offered a group rate, and can choose to participate in a SpeleoLab - a cave science program.

Talking Rocks Cavern is open year-round - closing only on Thanksgiving Day and Christmas Day. When inclement weather creates hazardous roads in the area, the cave may close for safety purposes.
