= Splish Splash (water park) =

Water park in Calverton, New York, US

Splish Splash Waterpark
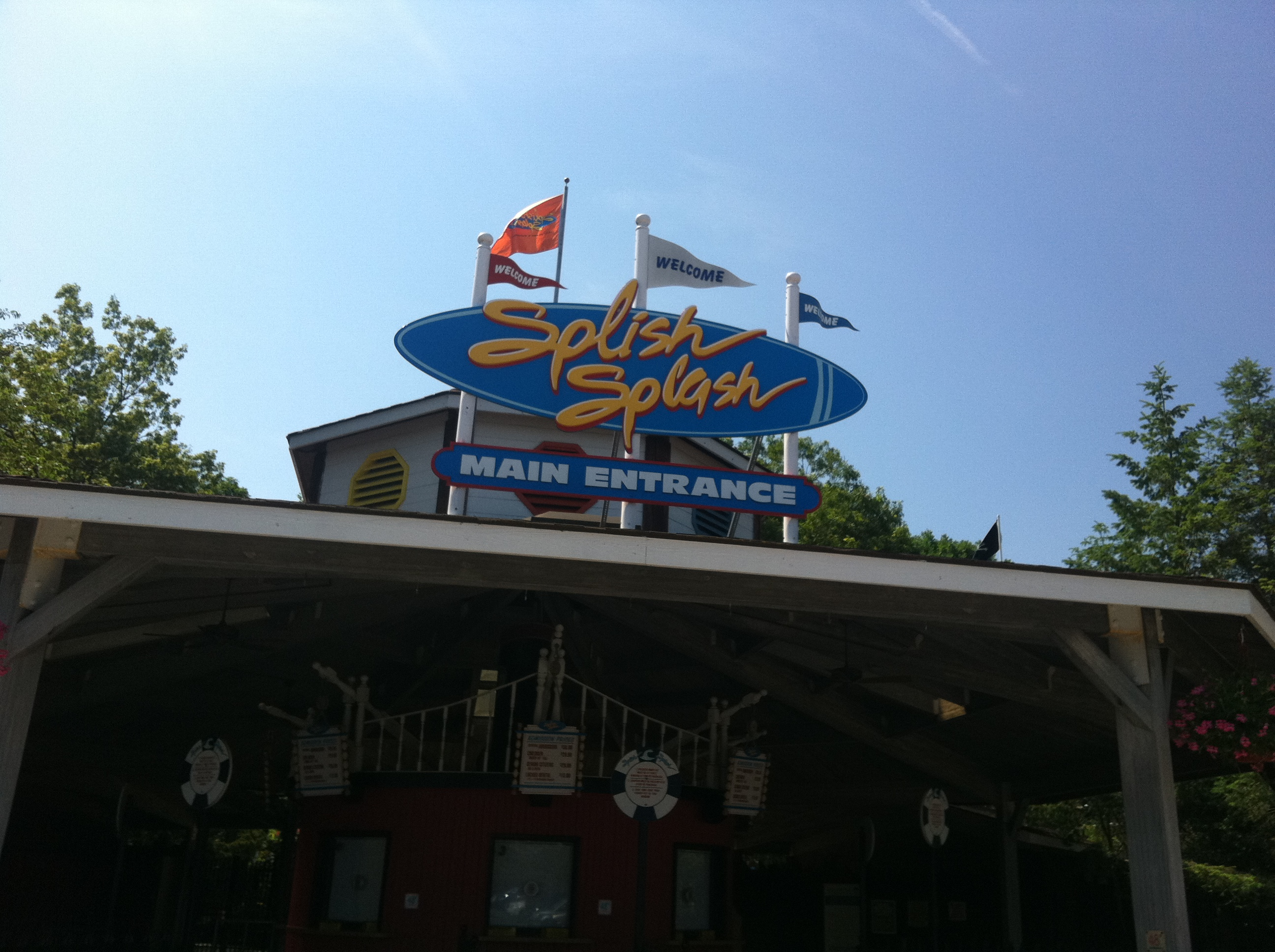
- Splish Splash Main Entrance
- Interactive map of Splish Splash Waterpark
- Slogan: Get Set to Get Wet!
- Location: Calverton, New York, United States
- Coordinates: 40.92074°N 72.72824°W
- Owner: Herschend
- Opened: May 1991
- Operating season: Memorial Day – Labor Day
- Area: 96 acres (390,000 m^{2})
- Pools: 3 pools
- Water slides: 30 water slides
- Website: splishsplash.com

Splish Splash is a 96-acre (390,000 m^{2}) water park located in Calverton, New York. It has 30 rides and is open for visitors from May to September. Travel Channel ranked Splish Splash as the third-best water park in the United States in the year 2009.

== History ==
Splish Splash was opened in Calverton, New York in May 1991 by Tony Gentile and Chip Cleary, who also own New York's Adventureland. It opened with three body slides, two-speed slides, two kiddie pools, two tube slides, a lazy river and a restaurant. The park was owned and operated by Palace Entertainment from 1999-2025. The park currently spans 96 acres (390,000 m^{2}). In 2006, Splish Splash added a new funnel-shaped ride called Alien Invasion. In July 2008, they announced that they would be adding 7 rides over the next few years, including Dr. Von Dark's Tunnel of Terror for 2009, Kahuna Bay for 2011, Bootlegger's Run for 2013, The Battle of Mutiny Bay for 2014, and two new rides introduced in 2018, Riptide Racer and Bombs Away. In 2020, the attraction Battle for Mutiny Bay was removed, and the park's owners opted to stay closed for the 2020 season due to the COVID-19 pandemic. Cliff Diver, an 80-foot tall body slide was removed in 2021.

In early 2025, the park was sold to Herschend.

== List of water attractions ==
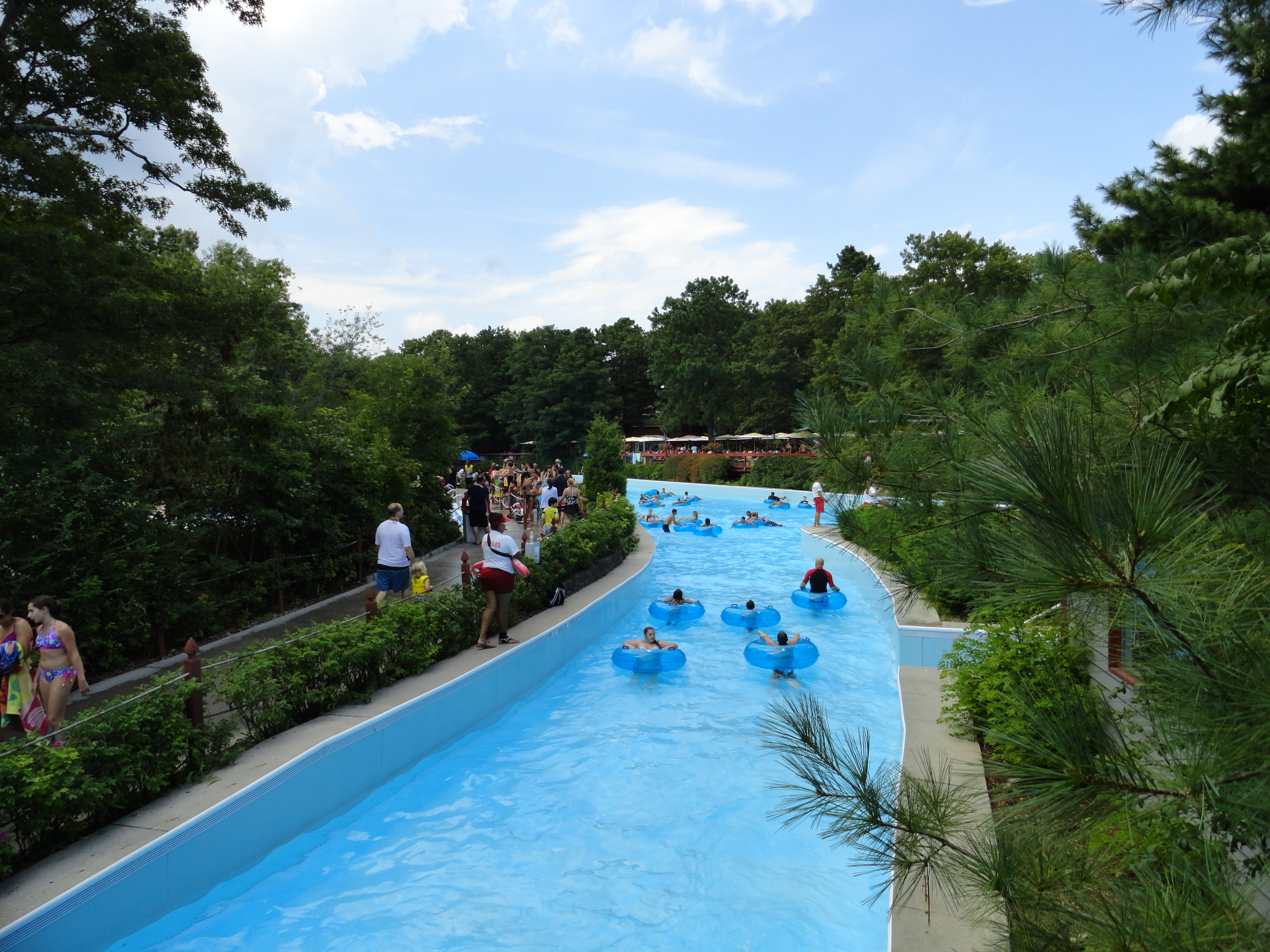
Lazy River

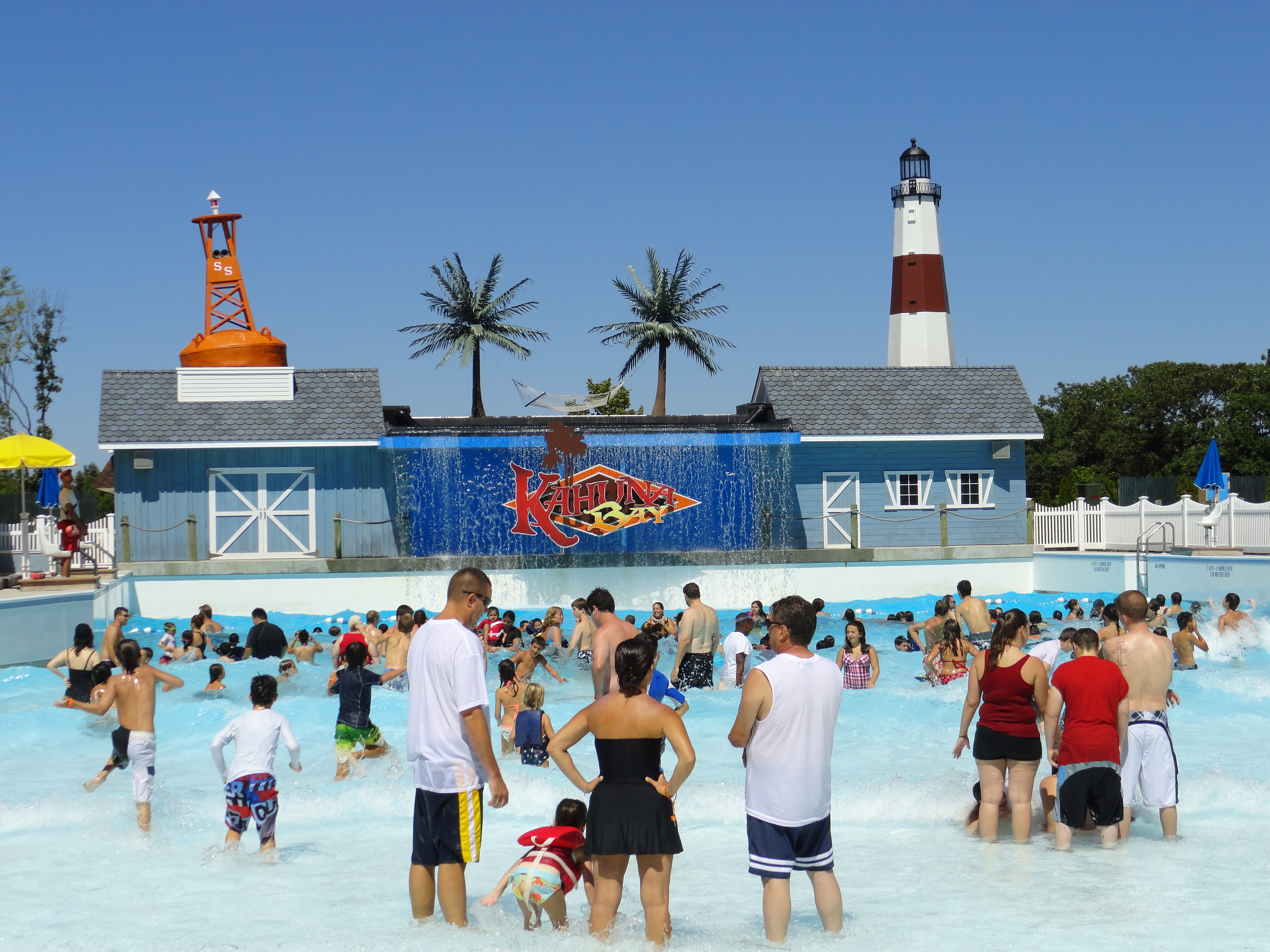
Kahuna Bay Wave Pool

1. Dinosaur Falls – Opened in 1991, Dinosaur Falls is a Pro-Slide pipeline with 3 slides. It was re-named in 2012 from Splash Landing and has a single or double inner tube that can accommodate either single or double riders.
2. Max Trax – Opened 1991, Max Trax consists of two plummet slides, one 50' straight down slide and one hump slide.
3. Lazy River – Opened 1991, the Lazy River is a relaxing tube ride with fountains and a wave area.
4. Hollywood Stunt Rider – Opened in 2002, Hollywood Stunt Rider is a dark mammoth family ride with a Hollywood theme (Family Raft) (2 - 4 Riders Required)
5. Hyperlight – Opened in 1992, Hyperlight features two enclosed tube slides (re-named and re-themed from The Abyss) (Single or Double Inner Tube) (single or double Riders)
6. Alien Invasion – Opened 2006, Alien Invasion is a ProSlide tornado with an alien abduction theme (Clover Leaf Raft).
7. Dr. Von Dark's Tunnel of Terror – Opened 2009, Dr. Von Dark's Tunnel of Terror is a Pro-Slide tantrum with high-speed 360 degree spins, and a 40 ft (12 m) drop (Round Double Tube) (2 Riders Required)
8. Kahuna Bay – Opened in 2011, a classic wave pool.
9. Dragon's Den – Opened in 2004, a Pro-Slide cannon bowl with a dragon in the middle of the bowl (Double Tube) (2 Riders Required).
10. Mammoth River – Opened in 1991, Mammoth River is an open mammoth family raft ride (Family Raft) (3 - 5 Riders Required).
11. Barrier Reef – Opened in 1993, Barrier Reef consists of 2 enclosed high speed body slides.
12. Giant Twister – Opened in 1991, Giant Twister includes 3 open body slides.
13. Shotgun Falls – Opened in 1994, Shotgun Falls is a free-fall drop slide into a 10 ft (3.0 m) deep pool (Body Slide).
14. Surf City – Opened in 1995, Surf City is a classic wave pool.
15. Soak City – a relaxing pool with in-water seats and water fountains
16. Bootlegger's Run – Opened in 2013, Bootlegger's Run is a water coaster featuring new generation hydromagnetic technology (New York's First Water Coaster) (Toboggan Inline Raft) (2 - 4 Riders Required)
17. Riptide Racer – Opened in 2018, Riptide Racer is the park's first unique face-first mat slide (1-4 riders)
18. Bombs Away – Opened in 2018, Bombs Away consists of double trapdoor body slides with a drop of 26 feet per second.

=== Attractions for kids under 54 inches only ===
1. The Elephant – an elephant slide with a falling spray of water. In 2015, it was replaced by a yellow submarine
2. Kiddie Slides – 3 open body slides featuring the only water slide in the park adults can ride with their children
3. Monsoon Lagoon – a shipwreck pool with a slide and many pirate themed objects that shoot water
4. Octopus Pool – a large octopus in the middle of a pool with swings on the tentacles
5. Pirates Cove – a pirate-themed pool with slides and water cannons

=== Former Attractions ===
1. Cliffdiver – Opened in 1996, Cliffdiver is an 80 ft tall body slide that closed in 2021

== See also ==
- List of waterparks
- Waterparks
