= Fire in the hole (disambiguation) =

Fire in the hole is a warning used in English-speaking countries to indicate that an explosive detonation in a confined space is imminent.

Fire in the Hole may also refer to:

== Music ==
- Fire in the Hole (album), a 2004 album by Brand Nubian
- "Fire in the Hole" (1970), a song by Exuma from his album Exuma II
- "Fire in the Hole" (Steely Dan song), 1972
- "Fire in the Hole" (1994), a song by the Tragically Hip from their album Day for Night
- "Fire in the Hole" (Skid Row song), 1998
- "Fire in the Hole" (Van Halen song), 1998
- "Fire in the Hole" (2012), a song by Pegboard Nerds
- "Fire in the Hole" (2015), a song by Marianas Trench
- "Fire in the Hole", a song by the American heavy metal band Five Finger Death Punch on their 2018 album And Justice for None

== Television ==
- "Fire in the Hole" (Justified), the pilot episode of the American TV series Justified
- "Fire in the Hole", a season 1 episode of Ash vs Evil Dead
- "Fire in the Hole", a season 3 episode of The Shield

== Other uses ==
- Fire in the Hole (1972 roller coaster) at Silver Dollar City in Branson, Missouri, United States
- Fire in the Hole (2024 roller coaster) at Silver Dollar City in Branson, Missouri, United States
- Fire in the Hole, a short story by Elmore Leonard, upon which the television series Justified is partly based
- Fire in the Hole: And Other Stories (Raylan Givens Book 4), a short fiction collection by Elmore Leonard
- Fire in the Hole, a meme in Geometry Dash community based on in-game sound with the same name and on series of "lobotomy" levels like "Lobotomy Dash"
