= Nope (soundtrack) =

Nope (Original Motion Picture Soundtrack)

Film score by Michael Abels
- Released: July 22, 2022
- Recorded: 2021–2022
- Genre: Film score
- Length: 82:55
- Label: Back Lot Music
- Producer: Michael Abels

Michael Abels chronology
Nightbooks (2022)	Nope (2022)	Breaking (2022)

Nope (Original Motion Picture Soundtrack) is the soundtrack to the 2022 film of the same name directed by Jordan Peele. The film is composed by Michael Abels, a regular collaborator of Peele, and was released by Back Lot Music on July 22, 2022. Most of the themes were written before the film's production and were developed with a 60-piece orchestra and 30-member vocal choir recorded for a year.

== Development ==
In July 2021, it was announced that Michael Abels would be composing the score for Nope. Abels previously scored Peele's Get Out (2017) and Us (2019). He described the score as having to meet the "threat level" described by Peele in the script and ideas inspired by the film's quote "What is a bad miracle?". The music is thereby carefully balanced to match the threat level in the script and storytelling and also compliment the visuals instead of overpowering them. Abels described the themes as a mixture of awe and terror, which signifies the bad miracle as discussed in the script. Describing the genre blend of the film's score, Abels opined that:

"The music needs to have both those senses together. Both a little bit of a sense of awe like we would have looking at the Grand Canyon, but then also the urge to run far away from the Grand Canyon because falling in would not be good. That's the dichotomy that's present in the film"

The tone of the film's music being established in the opening credits, which Abels did for Get Out and Us. Some of the themes were written even before the film's production, this included the OJ and Em's heroic theme, which was written as the audience could feel the thrills of the protagonist's risks, that felt realistic and the tonal shift from adventurous to horror music. Besides the action adventure themes, Abels also wrote a theme for the brother-sister relationship and a family love story. He added, "It's important to really start in all those places and kind of find where they all could join in a cohesive score."

He utilized eerie soundscapes to curate a layered and unsettling audio experience, especially in times of onscreen crisis. Some of the joyous and adventurous scenes which had been scored for the film were counterbalanced with eerie music for the unnerving sequences. Abels described that most of the music being aleatoric and improvised on paper, with specific instructions provided for the music team to denote the parameters of randomness and the method it has been played and the notations used throughout the score.

Abels utilized a 60-piece orchestra and a 30-member vocal choir to produce the score. The players used instruments such as strings, brass, woodwinds and percussions as a part of the orchestra. The strings were predominantly used to create anticipation and build tension through airy high-pitched notes and aggressive additions during pivotal moments, while percussions and woodwinds were utilized to heighten its intensity and provide a variety of sounds, textures and melodies in the score. Abels used the Wild West brass instrumentation in the climatic sequence to match the grandeur, a first for a Peele film. Further, he used snap pizzicato in the basses to curate percussive and unique sound textures.

Abels closely worked with the sound engineer Johnnie Burn, who mixed the soundtrack in Dolby Atmos. As silence being an integral part of the film, he admitted that:

"The tension between the negative space and the music is actually part of the music. Leaving room for the sound design, even when there's a cue playing, was an important part of the way I approached it. A lot of times in the scariest parts, especially in the earlier parts of this film, you're listening to what you hope you're not going to hear or what you thought you might have heard. The stillness allows you to freak out in that way."

== Release ==
Universal Pictures' in-house label Back Lot Music released the soundtrack day-and-date with the film on July 22, 2022. The 34-track album featured the songs "Walk On By" by Dionne Warwick, "Strange Animal" by Lawrence Gowan, "This Is the Lost Generation" by the Lost Generation, "Exuma, the Obeah Man" by Exuma, and a screwed version of Corey Hart's "Sunglasses at Night". The remainder of the album is accompanied by Abels' score. On August 12, Waxwork Records announced the vinyl edition of the soundtrack set for pre-order. The album is being packaged in a double LP 180-gram "Cloud and Pennant Banner" colored disc along with 12-inch booklet and an artwork designed by Ethan Mesa and liner notes from Tyree Boyd-Pates. The vinyl edition was eventually released on December 16.

== Reception ==
Lovia Gyarkye of The Hollywood Reporter wrote "Michael Abels' pulsating score help sustain the film right up through its transfixing end." Jimmy O. of JoBlo.com wrote "The score by Michael Abels adds a sense of mystery and fright." Phil de Semlyen of Time Out summarized that Abels' "terrific orchestral score" and the "magnificently loud and unearthly sound design" underlines the creepiness of the film. In contrast, critic based at Filmtracks.com wrote "The entirety of Abels' narrative arc for Nope is haphazard and unsatisfactory, leaving the score as one that relies on suspenseful execution from moment to moment to appeal." IndieWire ranked it as the second-best film scores of 2022.

== Track listing ==
Nope (Original Motion Picture Soundtrack) track listing
No.	Title	Writer(s)	Artist(s)	Length
1.	"Haywood Ranch"	Michael Abels	Abels	2:55
2.	"The Muybridge Clip"	Abels	Abels	3:34
3.	"La Vie C'est Chouette"	François D'Aime; Pierre Billon	Jodie Foster	2:44
4.	"Jupiter's Claim"	Abels	Abels	1:43
5.	"Brother Sister Walk"	Abels	Abels	1:18
6.	"Walk On By"	Burt Bacharach (music); Hal David (lyrics)	Dionne Warwick	2:54
7.	"Growing Up Haywood"	Abels	Abels	1:29
8.	"This Is the Lost Generation"	A. J. Tribble; Lowrell Simon; Fred Simon; Gus Redmond	The Lost Generation	3:34
9.	"Not Good"	Abels	Abels	2:00
10.	"What's a Bad Miracle"	Abels	Abels	1:32
11.	"The Oprah Shot"	Abels	Abels	1:51
12.	"Ancient Aliens"	Abels	Abels	2:08
13.	"Park Kids Prank Haywood"	Abels	Abels	1:08
14.	"It's in the Cloud"	Abels	Abels	2:37
15.	"Holy Sh*t It's Real"	Abels	Abels	2:09
16.	"Progressive Anxiety"	Abels	Abels	3:02
17.	"The Star Lasso Expeeerrriii..."	Abels	Abels	0:35
18.	"Arena Attack"	Abels	Abels	1:23
19.	"Sunglasses at Night" (Jean Jacket Mix)	Corey Hart	Hart	4:38
20.	"Blood Rain"	Abels	Abels	1:47
21.	"The Unaccounted For"	Abels	Abels	2:36
22.	"Preparing the Trap"	Abels	Abels	2:41
23.	"Purple People Eater"	Sheb Wooley	Michael Wincott; Abels	1:35
24.	"Exuma, the Obeah Man"	Exuma	Exuma	6:12
25.	"Man Down"	Abels	Abels	6:02
26.	"WTF Is That"	Abels	Abels	1:13
27.	"The Run (Urban Legends)"	Abels	Abels	1:42
28.	"Abduction"	Abels	Abels	1:58
29.	"Havoc"	Abels	Abels	0:46
30.	"Em & Angel Fly"	Abels	Abels	2:20
31.	"A Hero Falls"	Abels	Abels	2:47
32.	"Pursuit"	Abels	Abels	1:49
33.	"Winkin' Well"	Abels	Abels	3:42
34.	"Nope"	Abels	Abels	2:31
Total length:				82:55

== Personnel ==
Credits adapted from liner notes.

- Music – Michael Abels
- Additional music – Cameron Moody, Miguel Bezanilla, Orlando Perez Rosso
- Recording – Kevin Globerman, John Rodd
- Mixing and mastering – John Rodd
- Score editor – Dave Lawrence

Orchestra

- Orchestration – Edward Trybek, Henri Wilkinson, Jonathan Beard
- Additional orchestration – Benjamin Hoff, Jamie Thierman, Sean Barrett
- Orchestra conductor – Anthony Parnther
- Orchestra contractor – Zimmitti Music Group
- Music preparation – Jordan Cox
- Additional music preparation – Brandon Dalo, James Regan, Nikkia Cox, Seoyon MacDonald

Instruments

- Bass – Abraham Gumroyan, Will Johnson, Ed Meares, Geoff Osika, Ian Walker, Michael Franz, Mike Valerio, Oscar Hidalgo
- Bassoon – Damian Montano, Rose Corrigan
- Cello – Caleb Vaughn Jones, Charlie Tyler, Christopher Ahn, Eric Byers, Giovanna Clayton, Jake Braun, Julie Jung, Ross Gasworth, Tim Loo, Trevor Handy, Trevor Jarvis, Vanessa Freebairn Smith
- Clarinet – Jonathan Sacdalan, Stuart Clark
- Music editor – Brett 'Snacky' Pierce
- Flute – Ben Smolen, Dan Higgins, Jenni Olson
- French horn – Danielle Ondarza, Dylan Hart, Katie Faraudo, Kaylet Torrez, Laura Brenes, Mark Adams, Mike McCoy, Teag Reaves
- Guitar – Dean Parks
- Oboe – Claire Brazeau, Lara Wickes
- Percussion – Brian Kilgore, Sidney Hopson, Wade Culbreath
- Timpani – Wade Culbreath
- Trombone – Alex Iles, Ido Meshulam, Nick Daley, Phil Keen
- Trumpet – Barry Perkins, Dan Rosenboom, David Washburn, Jon Lewis, Rob Schaer
- Tuba – Doug Tornquist, Gabriel Sears
- Viola – Aaron Oltman, Alma Fernandez, Andrew Duckles, Colleen Sugata, David Walther, Diana Wade, Erik Rynearson, Luke Maurer, Meredith Crawford, Nolan Livesay, Rob Brophy, Shawn Mann, Stefan Smith
- Violin – Alyssa Park, Amy Hershberger, Ana Landauer, Ashoka Thiagarajan, Ben Jacobson, Camille Miller, Charlie Bisharat, Eun Mee Ahn, Grace Oh, Ina Veli, Jacqueline Brand, Jessica Guideri, Josefina Vergara, Julie Rogers, Kevin Kumar, Kyle Gilner, Leonard Chong, Luanne Homzy, Maia Jasper, Marisa Kuney, Mark Robertson, Natalie Leggett, Neel Hammond, Nina Evtuhov, Paul Cartwright, Roberto Cani, Roger Wilkie, Sara Parkins, Sarah Thornblade, Shalini Vijayan, Songa Lee, Stephanie Matthews, Stephanie Yu, Tammy Hatwan, Tereza Stanislav, Wynton Grant
- Whistle – Greg Whipple

Choir

- Choir conductor and contractor – Edie Lehmann Boddicker
- Alto – Aleta Braxton, Ann Sheridan, Ayo Awosika, Bobbi Page, Edie Lehmann Boddicker, Gaga Avakian, Gracie Laboy, Tehillah Alphonso
- Baritone – Abdiel Gonzalez, Ben Lin, Dylan Gentile, John West, Kevin Dorsey, Marc Pritchett, Michael Geiger, Reid Bruton
- Soprano – Baraka May, Charlean Carmon, Elissa Johnston, Holly Sedillos, Ivana Cespedes Jordan, Suzanne Waters, Valerie Tambaoan, Vangie Gunn Goodwin
- Tenor – Arnold Geis, Caleb Curry, Charles Lane, Edmond Rodriguez, Fletcher Sheridan, Gregory Fletcher, Saunder Choi, Tim Davis

== Accolades ==
Accolades for Nope (Original Motion Picture Soundtrack)
Award	Date of ceremony	Category	Recipient(s)	Result	Ref.
ASCAP Awards	May 15, 2023	Film Score of the Year	Michael Abels	Won	
Black Reel Awards	February 6, 2023	Outstanding Score	Michael Abels	Nominated	
Florida Film Critics Circle	December 22, 2022	Best Score	Michael Abels	Runner-up	
Georgia Film Critics Association	January 13, 2023	Best Original Score	Michael Abels	Nominated	
Hollywood Music in Media Awards	November 16, 2022	Best Original Score in a Horror Film	Michael Abels	Won	
International Film Music Critics Association Awards	February 23, 2023	Best Original Score for a Fantasy/Science Fiction/Horror Film	Michael Abels	Won	
Saturn Awards	October 25, 2022	Best Music	Michael Abels	Nominated	
Seattle Film Critics Society	January 17, 2023	Best Original Score	Michael Abels	Nominated	
