= Do Wah Nanny =

1971 album by Exuma

Studio album by Exuma
- Released: 1971
- Studios: Regent Sound, New York City
- Length: 38:13 (original vinyl release); 42:29 (1992 CD reissue)
- Label: Kama Sutra

Exuma chronology
Exuma II (1970)	Do Wah Nanny (1971)	Snake (1972)

Do Wah Nanny is the third studio album by Bahamian folk musician Exuma. It was released in 1971, and was the first record by Exuma to be issued through Kama Sutra Records.

== Reception ==
Professional ratings
Review scores
Source	Rating
AllMusic	2.5/5 stars

In a retrospective review, Stewart Mason of AllMusic wrote that Do Wah Nanny "moves away a bit from the voodoo imagery" of Ezuma's previous two albums, "instead going for a good-timey sound similar to the New Orleans gumbo of Dr. John." Mason concluded, "Exuma and his mostly percussive band wend their way through the eight mostly lengthy ('22nd Century' runs nine droning minutes) tracks with the mixture of smoldering passion and infectious joy that's at the heart of Bahamian music."

== Track listing ==
=== Original vinyl release ===
All tracks are written by Exuma.

Side one
No.	Title	Length
1.	"Do Wah Nanny"	4:20
2.	"Silver City"	6:30
3.	"Eyebrows and Beard"	2:55
4.	"She Looks So Fine"	4:10
Total length:		17:55

Side two
No.	Title	Length
1.	"Roweena"	4:54
2.	"The Bowery"	3:24
3.	"22nd Century"	9:00
4.	"Do Wah Nanny (Part 2)"	3:00
Total length:		20:18

=== 1992 CD reissue ===
All tracks are written by Exuma.

Side one
No.	Title	Length
1.	"Introduction"	0:41
2.	"Do Wah Nanny"	4:14
3.	"Silver City"	6:28
4.	"Eyebrows and Beards"	2:54
5.	"She Looks So Fine"	3:36
6.	"The Bowery"	3:17
7.	"Roweena"	4:42
8.	"22nd Century"	8:17
9.	"Do Wah Nanny (Part 2)"	2:46
10.	"Do Wah Nanny (Live)"	4:56
11.	"Ending"	0:38
Total length:		42:29

== Personnel ==
Adapted from the album's liner notes.

- Exuma – lead vocals, background vocals, guitar, ankle bells, "sacred foot drums"
- Bob Wyld (credited as Daddy Ya-Ya) – marching drum, background vocals
- Peppy Thielhelm – congas, percussion
- Lord Wellington – congas, percussion
- Lord Cherry – congas, percussion
- Yogi – junk bells, background vocals
- Sally O'Brien – background vocals, whistles
- Diana Claudia Bunea – background vocals, whistles
- H. W. Mannings – cowbells
- Cordell Thompson – cowbells
- Alfred "Peewee" Ellis – saxophone (on "Do Wah Nanny")
- John Gatchell – trumpet (on "Do Wah Nanny")
- Bruce Samuels – bass (on "Do Wah Nanny")

Production

- Daddy Ya-Ya – producer
- Bob Liftin – engineer
