= Exuma (album) =

1970 album by Exuma

Studio album by Exuma
- Released: May 1970
- Recorded: Regent Sound, New York City
- Genres: Junkanoo; folk
- Length: 38:41
- Label: Mercury
- Producer: Daddy Ya Ya

Exuma chronology
Exuma (1970)	Exuma II (1970)

Singles from Exuma
- 1. "Exuma, the Obeah Man" Released: 1970

Exuma is the debut studio album by Bahamian folk musician Exuma. It was originally released in May 1970 on the Mercury label.

== Background ==
In the early 1960s, Exuma (born Macfarlane Gregory Anthony Mackey) had moved to Greenwich Village, New York and started playing guitar and singing in the cultivating folk rock scene developing in that area. Finding some measured success playing calypso with his friends as Tony McKay and the Islanders, he then was approached in 1969 by Blues Magoos producer Bob Wyld offering a record deal; he chose to adopt "Exuma, the Obeah Man" as his name. The pseudonym draws from memories of Junkanoo festivals from his childhood.

== Production ==
Wyld adopted the pseudonym "Daddy Ya Ya" and recruited a few musicians for the album, including Peppy Castro of the Blues Magoos (who was credited under the pseudonym "Spy Boy Thielheim"). During recording sessions, Exuma would often turn off the lights and set up candles, recalling songs from his dreams. The album cover was painted by Exuma himself.

== Release and reception ==
Professional ratings
Review scores
Source	Rating
AllMusic	4.5/5 stars

The album was release in 1970 on Mercury Records. The opening track on the album, "Exuma, the Obeah Man", was released as a single.

The album received positive reviews and moderate airplay at the time of its release. In a retrospective review, Richie Unterberger of AllMusic wrote, "Exuma's debut album was a real odd piece of work...it's kind of like a combination of the Bahamian folk of Joseph Spence with early Dr. John at his most voodooed-out...It's a little surprising that this stuff hasn't undergone a sizable cult revival." Andrew Bird made a similar comparison in a brief retrospective review for Pitchfork, comparing the album to the work of Spence as well as blues performers Charley Patton and Reverend Gary Davis.

The album has been described not just as a folk record, but also as both psychedelic and experimental.

== In popular culture ==
Nina Simone recorded covers of "Dambala" and "Exuma, the Obeah Man" (which she re-titled "Obeah Woman") on her 1974 record, It Is Finished.

“You Don’t Know What’s Going On” was featured in the 1970 nihilist comedy film Joe and was included on the film’s soundtrack.

"Exuma, the Obeah Man" was featured (playing from vinyl, with the album cover visible) in the 2022 film Nope, with the song being featured on the film's soundtrack.

== Track listing ==
All tracks are written by Exuma.

Side one
No.	Title	Length
1.	"Exuma, the Obeah Man"	6:16
2.	"Dambala"	5:34
3.	"Mama Loi, Papa Loi"	4:32

Side two
No.	Title	Length
1.	"Junkanoo"	3:24
2.	"Seance in the Sixth Fret"	7:14
3.	"You Don't Know What's Going On"	3:27
4.	"The Vision"	7.59
Total length:		38:41

== Personnel ==
Adapted from LP liner notes:

- Exuma – lead vocals, guitar, bells, foot drum
- Daddy Ya Ya – producer, vocals, bells, foot drum, "sacred sand"
- Spy Boy Thielheim – backing vocals, triangle, cabasa, whistle, bells
- Lord Wellington – congas
- Frankie Gearing – backing vocals
- Geraldine McBride – backing vocals
- Mildred Vaney – backing vocals
- Princess Diana – backing vocals
- Sally O'Brien – backing vocals
