= Snake (album) =

1972 album by Exuma

Studio album by Exuma
- Released: February 1972
- Studio: Bell Sound (New York City)
- Length: 39:50
- Label: Kama Sutra
- Producer: Exuma

Exuma chronology
Do Wah Nanny (1971)	Snake (1972)	Reincarnation (1972)

Snake is the fourth studio album by Bahamian folk musician Exuma, released in 1972 through Kama Sutra Records.

== Reception ==
Professional ratings
Review scores
Source	Rating
AllMusic	2/5 stars

Upon its release, Lynn Van Matre of the Chicago Tribune called the album "Wholly weird and mostly wonderful." In a retrospective review, J. Chandler of AllMusic commended the album's cover artwork but wrote that the album's music content "is pretty indistinguishable from the rest of the low-budget drugged out hippie Hare Krishna rock-jazz chant music being made at the time."

== Track listing ==
All tracks are written by Exuma

Side one
No.	Title	Length
1.	"Obeah, Obeah O"	3:50
2.	"Snake"	2:50
3.	"Don't Let Go"	2:33
4.	"Attica Part 1"	7:00
Total length:		16:13

Side two
No.	Title	Length
1.	"Thirteenth Sunday"	3:27
2.	"Subway Bound for Hell"	3:40
3.	"Happiness and Sunshine"	5:54
4.	"Summertime in New York"	3:37
5.	"Andros Is Atlantis Rising"	3:37
6.	"Exuma's Reincarnation"	3:22
Total length:		23:37

== Personnel ==
Adapted from the album's liner notes.

- Exuma – lead vocals, guitar, background vocals, cowbells, calling bells, triangle
- Yogi Achmed Benn Mansel – background vocals
- Sally O'Brien – background vocals
- Tonice Gwathney – background vocals
- Barbara Simon "Omolaye" – background vocals
- Michael O'Neil – background vocals, congas, saxophone
- Michael B. Olatunji – talking drum, African congas, African shaker
- Michael Laneve – timbales
- John Russo – electric bass, violin, lead guitar (on "Don't Let Go")
- George J. Clemmons "Duke" – upright bass
- Jeffory Miller – set drums
- Stanley Wiley – piano
- Akinjorin Omolade "Juice" – lead saxophone, African drums
- Jerry Gongales – trumpet
- Carl Jennings – trumpet
- Cuchlow Eliebank – steel pan
- Dave Libert – piano (on "Don't Let Go", "Happiness", and "Sunshine")
