= Andrew Patrick Ralston =

American actor

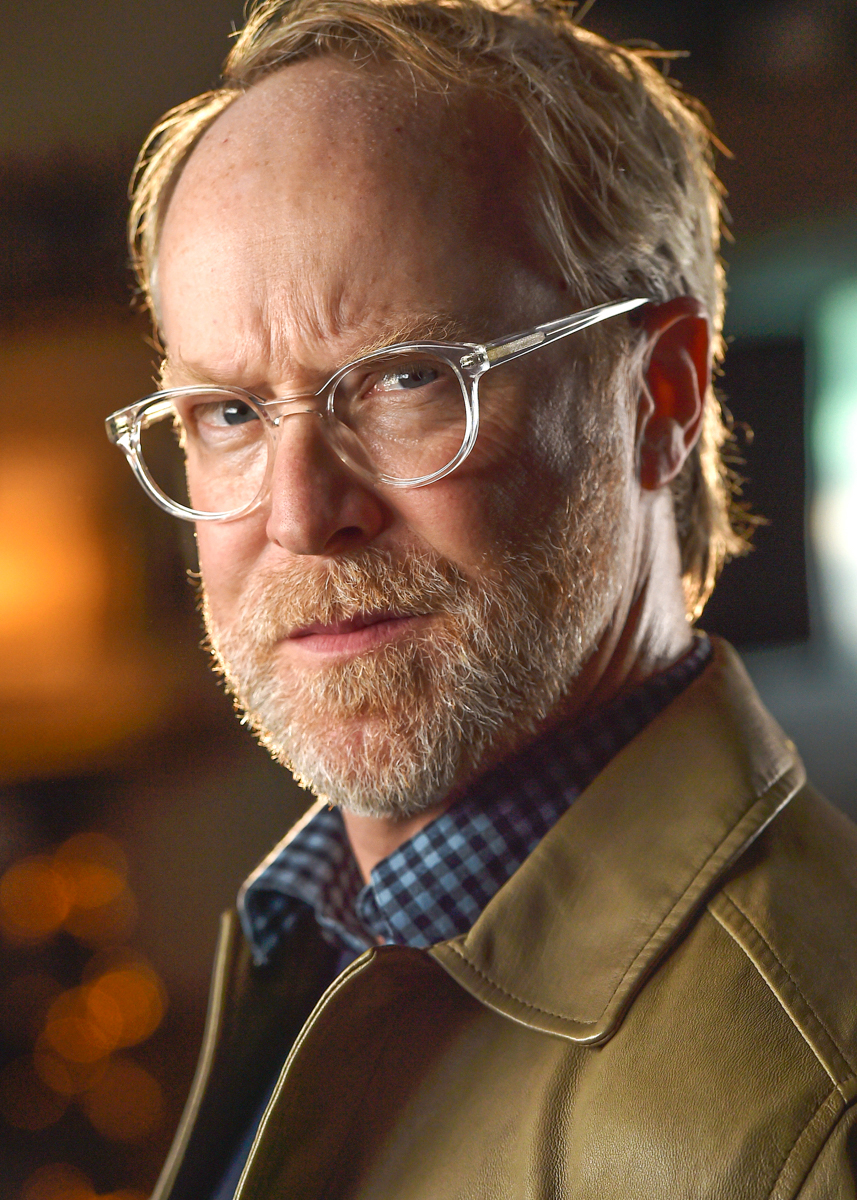
- Born: Maryville, Missouri, U.S.
- Occupations: Actor, comedian
- Years active: 1997–present
- Spouse: Brenna Lampson (m. 2015)

Andrew Patrick Ralston is an American actor raised in Scottsdale, Arizona and Overland Park, Kansas. He is known for playing Tom Bogan/Brett Houston in the Gordy's Home sequence of Jordan Peele's Nope and Jim McNeile in the TV adaptation of Lethal Weapon. He was also Dr. Saul Faerstein on The People v. O. J. Simpson: American Crime Story, Chip Baggins on Life in Pieces and Sherpa Allen on Crazy Ex-Girlfriend. He has also starred in over 50 national commercials.

== Television ==
Year	Title	Role	Notes
2001	The Huntress	Dickie Manos	Episode: "Busted"
2006	CSI: NY	Peter Rector	Episode: "Wasted"
2007	Raines	Scott Bills	Episode: "Reconstructing Alice"
2007	The Riches	Mel	Episode: "X Spots the Mark"
2009	Criminal Minds	Bernard	Episode: "Cold Comfort"
2009	Citizen Jane	District Attorney Adam McArthur	Movie
2010	Big Time Rush	Teleprompter Gary	Episode: "Big Time Live"
2011	Bones	Benny Winkler	Episode: "The Killer in the Crosshairs"
2013	The Mentalist	Stephen Doppler	Episode: "There Will Be Blood"
2014	Married	Husband	Episode: "Waffles & Pizza"
2015	Fear the Walking Dead	Lab Coat	Episode: "Pilot"
2015	Brooklyn Nine-Nine	Bryce	Episode: "New Captain"
2015	You're the Worst	Man	Episode: "All About That Paper"
2016	Real Husbands of Hollywood	Lance the Moderator	Episode: "Easy as 1-2-3"
2016	Life in Pieces	Chip Baggins	Episode: "Tattoo Valentine Guitar Pregnant"
2016	Scorpion	Professor Tolleson	2 episodes
2016	Dice	Waiter	Episode: "Sal Maldonado"
2016	Rush Hour	Bill Herman	Episode: "Wind Beneath My Wingman"
2016	Crazy Ex-Girlfriend	Sherpa Allen	Episode: "Why Is Josh's Ex-Girlfriend Eating Carbs"
2016	Fresh Off the Boat	Greg	Episode: "WWJD: What Would Jessica Do?"
2016	The People v. O. J. Simpson: American Crime Story	Dr. Saul Faerstein	2 episodes
2017	The New Edition Story	Photographer #4	Episode: "Part 3"
2017	Veep	Bryan	Episode: "Judge"
2017	I'm Dying Up Here	Producer	Episode: "The Return"
2016–2018	Lethal Weapon	Jim McNeile	7 episodes
2018	Speechless	Foreman	Episode: "ONE A-N-- ANGRY M-- MAYA"
2018	Reverie	Doctor	Episode: "The Key"
2018	Marlon	Dave Cirillo	Episode: "Career Day"
2018	Black-ish	Greg	Episode: "Beasts Of The Suburban Wild"
2019	The Politician	Dean Lawrence	Episode: "Pilot"
2019	Lucifer	Peter	Episode: "Super Bad Boyfriend"
2020	Man with a Plan	Mason	Episode: "Adam and Andi See Other People"
2021	Physical	Bill Glimerton	Episode 105
2021	The L Word: Generation Q	Carl Hanes	Episode 208
2021	Impeachment: American Crime Story	FOX Producer	Episode 410
2021	Young Sheldon	Pastor Steve	Episode 502
2022	Gaslit	Chennault	Episode 104
2022	S.W.A.T.	Chaplain Tom Adams	Episode 515
2023	The Morning Show	Elmer	Episode 301
2023	American Auto	Grant	Episode 211
2025	Night Court	Daddy	Episode 309
2025	Side Quest	Kevin	Episode: "Fugue"
2025	Abbott Elementary	Optimistic Principal	Episode 414
2025	I Love LA	Joe	Episode 6

== Film ==
Year	Title	Role	Notes
2001	The Medicine Show	Concerned Christian Soul	
2009	Adam	Mr. Garland (Tour Leader)	
2010	Sex Tax: Based on a True Story	Ed	
2020	Pink Skies Ahead	Waiter	
2020	Horse Girl	Homeless Person	
2021	Pencil Town	Fred Willis	
2021	The Hyperions	Captain Woodcock	
2022	Nope	Tom Bogan/Brett Houston	
2027	Paris Paramount	Older Gent In Prison	
