= Reincarnation (Exuma album) =

1972 album by Exuma

Studio album by Exuma
- Released: 1972
- Studio: Bell Sound (New York City)
- Length: 29:23
- Label: Kama Sutra
- Producer: Kenny Kerner; Richie Wise

Exuma chronology
Snake (1972)	Reincarnation (1972)	Life (1973)

Reincarnation is the fifth studio album by Bahamian folk musician Exuma, released in 1972 through Kama Sutra Records.

== Reception ==
A reviewer for Billboard wrote of the album: "Strong appeal here to both the pop and soul markets from the flashy Exuma. Originals such as 'Brown Girl' and 'Baby, Let Me In' are strong, as is his interpretation of Paul McCartney's 'Monkberry Moon Delight.'" Sidney Nelson of the Evening Post referred to the track "Obeah Man Come Back" as one that generates "tremendous excitement", and "Metastophaliese" as a "rather sinister incantation/hymn"; Nelson concluded that the album "allow[s] not a moment of boredom to set in".

== Track listing ==
All tracks are written by Exuma, except where noted

Side A
No.	Title	Length
1.	"Brown Girl"	2:47
2.	"Monkberry Moon Delight" (Paul McCartney)	3:32
3.	"Metastophaliese"	2:17
4.	"Obeah Man Come Back"	2:29
5.	"Baby, Let Me In"	2:22
6.	"Pay Me What You Owe Me"	2:23
Total length:		15:50

Side B
No.	Title	Length
1.	"Empty Barrels"	2:14
2.	"Walking Home"	2:54
3.	"Rushing Through the Crowd"	2:34
4.	"Ballad for Sammy"	2:59
5.	"Exuma's Reincarnation"	2:52
Total length:		13:33

== Personnel ==
Adapted from the album's liner notes.

- Exuma – lead vocals, background vocals, guitar, cowbells, whistles, goat skin drums, ankle bells, "sacred sand", throat harp, "sand box", "walking road"
- Achmed Ben Mansel (Yogi Bagabby) – backing vocals, cowbells, percussion, "sand box", "walking road"
- Michael O'Neil (Ouimungie Pappa Legra) – C melody saxophone, tenor saxophone, flute, conga, African talking drum, goat skin drum, background vocals
- Baron Samedi – cowbells, background vocals, bass throat harp, "shadow ring"
- Kester Smith – drums (on "Brown Girl", "Monkberry Moon Delight", and "Exuma's Reincarnation"
- Kenny Aaronson – bass (except where indicated)
- Richie Wise – guitar (on "Monkberry Moon Delight")
- Paul Carpenter – piano (on "Monkberry Moon Delight" and "Pay Me What You Owe Me")
- Al Hicks – drums, background vocals
- Fernado Gumbs – bass (on "Pay Me What You Owe Me" and "Walking Home")
