= Nope (film) =

2022 film by Jordan Peele

- Theatrical release poster
- Directed by: Jordan Peele
- Written by: Jordan Peele
- Produced by: Jordan Peele; Ian Cooper
- Starring: Daniel Kaluuya; Keke Palmer; Steven Yeun; Michael Wincott; Brandon Perea; Keith David
- Cinematography: Hoyte van Hoytema
- Edited by: Nicholas Monsour
- Music by: Michael Abels
- Production companies: Universal Pictures; Monkeypaw Productions
- Distributed by: Universal Pictures
- Release dates: July 18, 2022 (Los Angeles); July 22, 2022 (United States)
- Running time: 130 minutes
- Country: United States
- Language: English
- Budget: $68 million
- Box office: $172 million

Nope (stylized in all caps) is a 2022 American science fiction neo-Western horror film written, directed, and produced by Jordan Peele. It stars Daniel Kaluuya, Keke Palmer, Steven Yeun, Michael Wincott, Brandon Perea, and Keith David. In the film, horse-wrangling siblings Otis "OJ" Jr. (Kaluuya) and Emerald (Palmer) attempt to capture evidence of an unidentified flying object in Agua Dulce, California.

Peele announced Nope, which is his third directorial film, in November 2020. He cited King Kong (1933), The Wizard of Oz (1939), Jaws (1975), Close Encounters of the Third Kind (1977), Jurassic Park (1993) and Signs (2002) as his main inspirations. Palmer and Kaluuya joined in February 2021. Yeun was cast the next month, and Peele revealed the title in July 2021. Filming began in June 2021 in Los Angeles County, and wrapped that November. Nope was produced under Peele and Ian Cooper's Monkeypaw Productions banner.

Nope premiered at the TCL Chinese Theatre in Los Angeles on July 18, 2022, and was theatrically released in the United States on July 22, 2022, by Universal Pictures. It grossed $172 million worldwide, and received positive reviews for its ambition, performances, cinematography, themes, visual style, score, and Peele's direction. It was also named one of the top ten films of 2022 by the American Film Institute. Since its release, Nope has been included in lists of the best science fiction films of the 21st century and is considered one of the best science fiction films of all time.

== Plot ==
In Agua Dulce, California, the Haywood family trains and handles horses for film productions. One day, at their ranch, small metallic objects begin rapidly falling from the sky. A nickel strikes Otis Haywood Sr. in the head, killing him.

Six months later, Otis's children, Otis Jr. ("OJ") and Emerald ("Em") are fired from a production after their horse, Lucky, reacts disruptively to his reflection in a chrome ball used for visual effects. To raise money, OJ has been selling some of their horses to Ricky "Jupe" Park, a former child actor who operates a Western-themed amusement park called Jupiter's Claim. Jupe previously starred on Gordy's Home, a family sitcom about a chimpanzee named Gordy. During filming in 1998, one of the chimps who portrayed Gordy reacted violently to the sound of popping balloons and mauled most of the cast and crew before being shot. Jupe has since settled down with his wife, Amber, and their three sons, but now exploits his trauma from the event in the hopes of revitalizing his career.

"Plate 626" from Eadweard Muybridge's Animal Locomotion, "the very first assembly of photographs used to create a motion picture", referenced in the film

One night, the Haywoods notice their electricity fluctuating and their horses aggressively reacting to an unknown presence. They discover an unidentified flying object (UFO) that has been taking their horses. The siblings decide to document and sell evidence of the UFO's existence, recruiting electronics store employee Angel Torres to set up surveillance cameras. The UFO arrives and abducts a horse that has broken out of the ranch stable, as well as a metal horse statue Em has stolen from Jupiter's Claim to act as a decoy. The next day, Em attempts to recruit famed cinematographer Antlers Holst to help them record the UFO. Holst declines, not wanting to encourage Em in what he considers an unfulfilling pursuit of wealth and fame. Angel arrives, having noticed while watching footage from the cameras a cloud in the valley that never moves; OJ suspects this is the UFO's hiding place before concluding, based on its flight patterns, that it may be a living creature.

After months of secretly offering the Haywoods' horses to the UFO to gain its trust and attempt to domesticate it, Jupe introduces a live show in Jupiter's Claim, intending to use Lucky as bait to lure out the UFO. The UFO arrives earlier than expected and consumes everyone in attendance, ultimately leaving only Lucky alive. While retrieving Lucky, OJ confirms his theory that the UFO is actually a territorial, predatory animal. After the creature showers the Haywood household with the regurgitated remains of the Jupiter's Claim crowd, OJ realizes that it only attacks those who look directly at it and devises a plan to record it. Em and Angel are hesitant until Em receives a call from Holst, who now agrees to help. OJ names the creature "Jean Jacket" after an unruly horse the Haywoods once owned.

To circumvent Jean Jacket's effect of shutting down all electrical equipment in its vicinity, Holst brings a hand-cranked film camera. The group sets up a field of battery-powered tube men to track its location. However, a TMZ reporter trespasses onto the field and is thrown from his electric motorcycle when it shuts down near Jean Jacket, which devours him shortly after. While capturing footage, Holst climbs a hill for a "better view" but instead sacrifices himself to be consumed along with his camera, but capturing footage of the creature. Angel narrowly escapes being eaten by Jean Jacket by wrapping himself in barbed wire. Jean Jacket then unfurls into a much larger form resembling a jellyfish.

OJ intentionally looks directly at Jean Jacket to distract it, allowing Em to rush to Jupiter's Claim on the motorcycle. There, she untethers the park's large helium balloon mascot of Jupe, whose winking eye attracts Jean Jacket's attention. Jean Jacket attempts to feed on the balloon while Em uses a manual camera from the park's coin-operated wishing well attraction to photograph it. After Jean Jacket swallows the balloon, it bursts, violently rupturing the creature's body from within and killing it. With photographic evidence of the creature's existence and reporters arriving nearby, Em sees OJ and Lucky standing outside Jupiter's Claim, unharmed.

== Cast ==
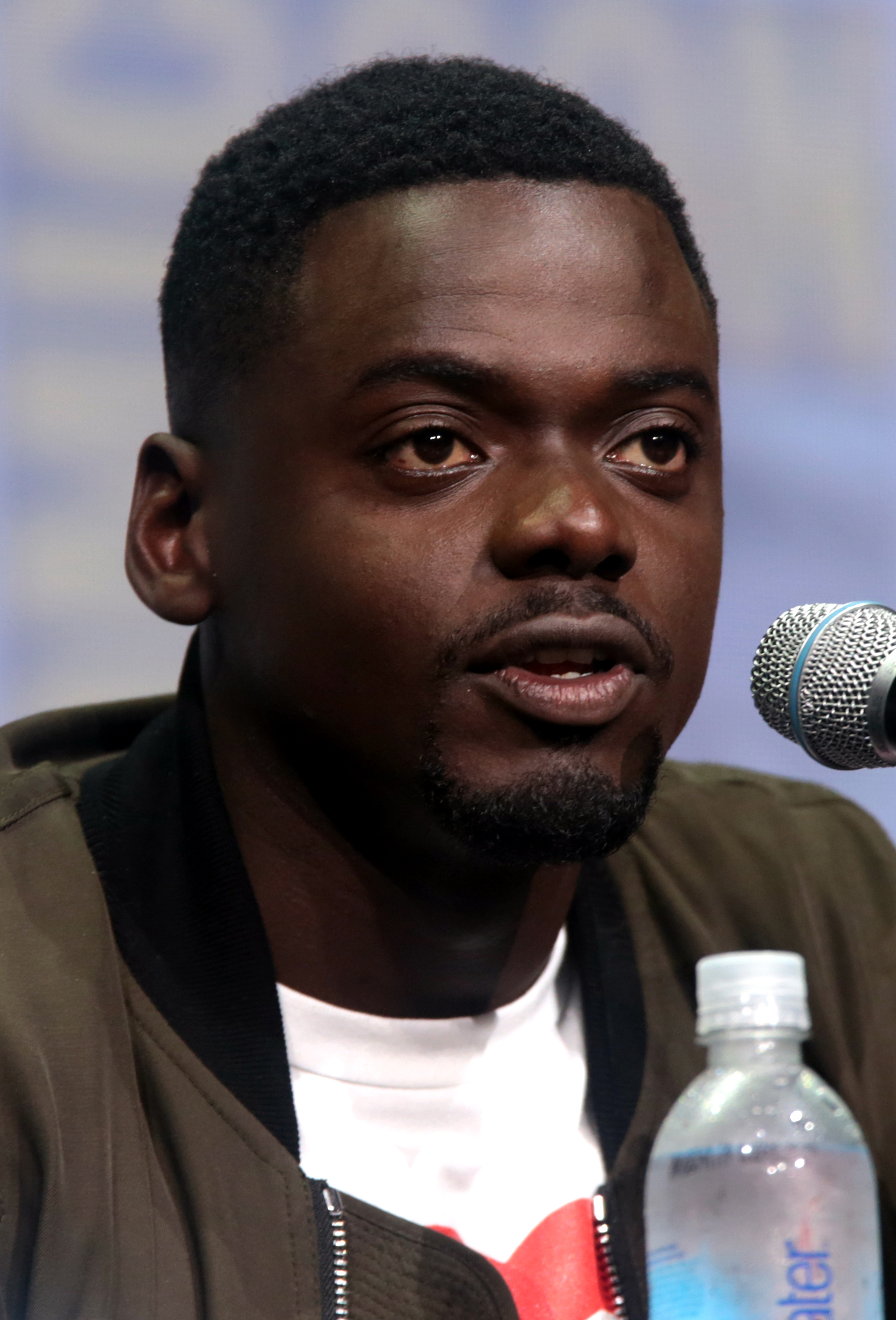
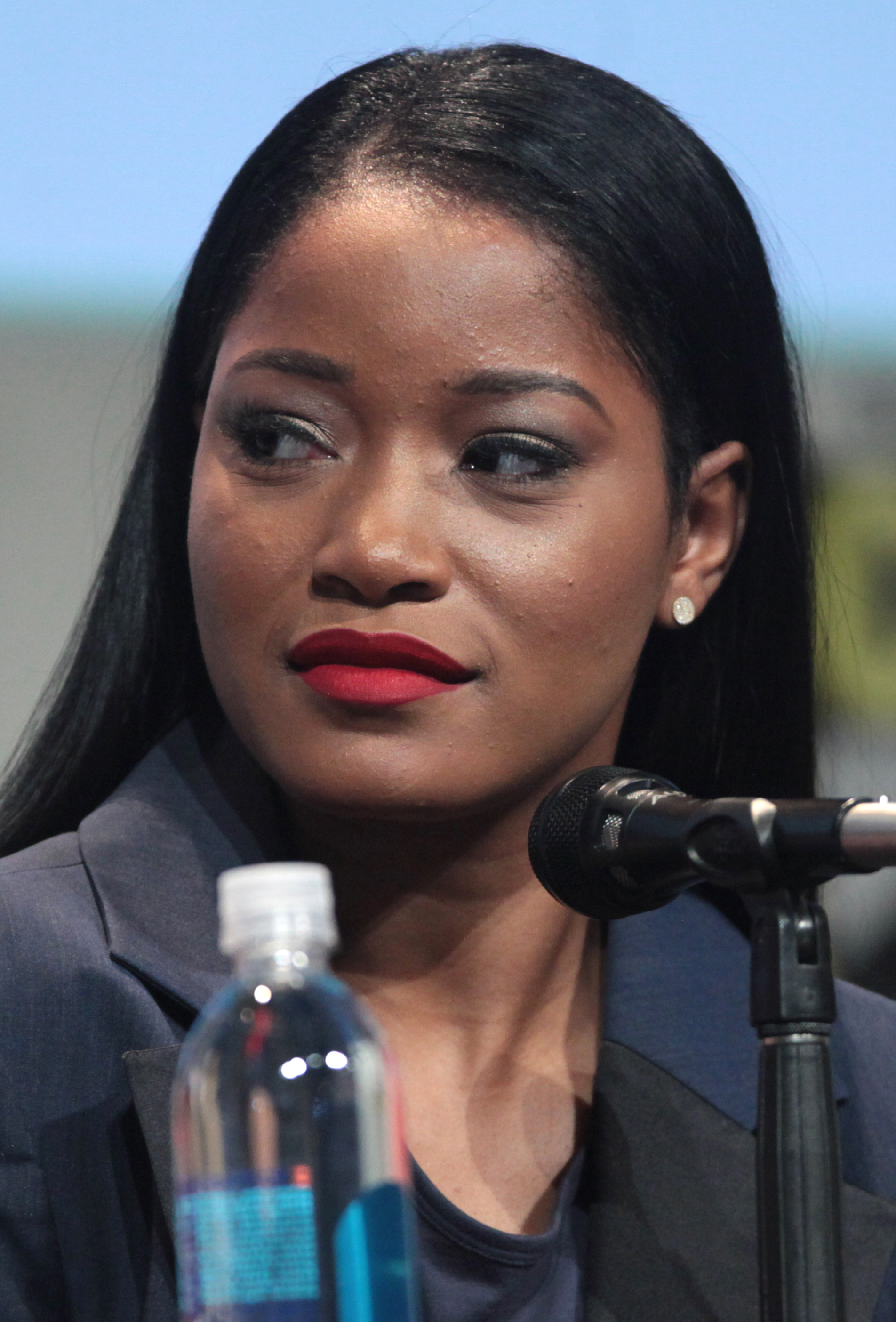
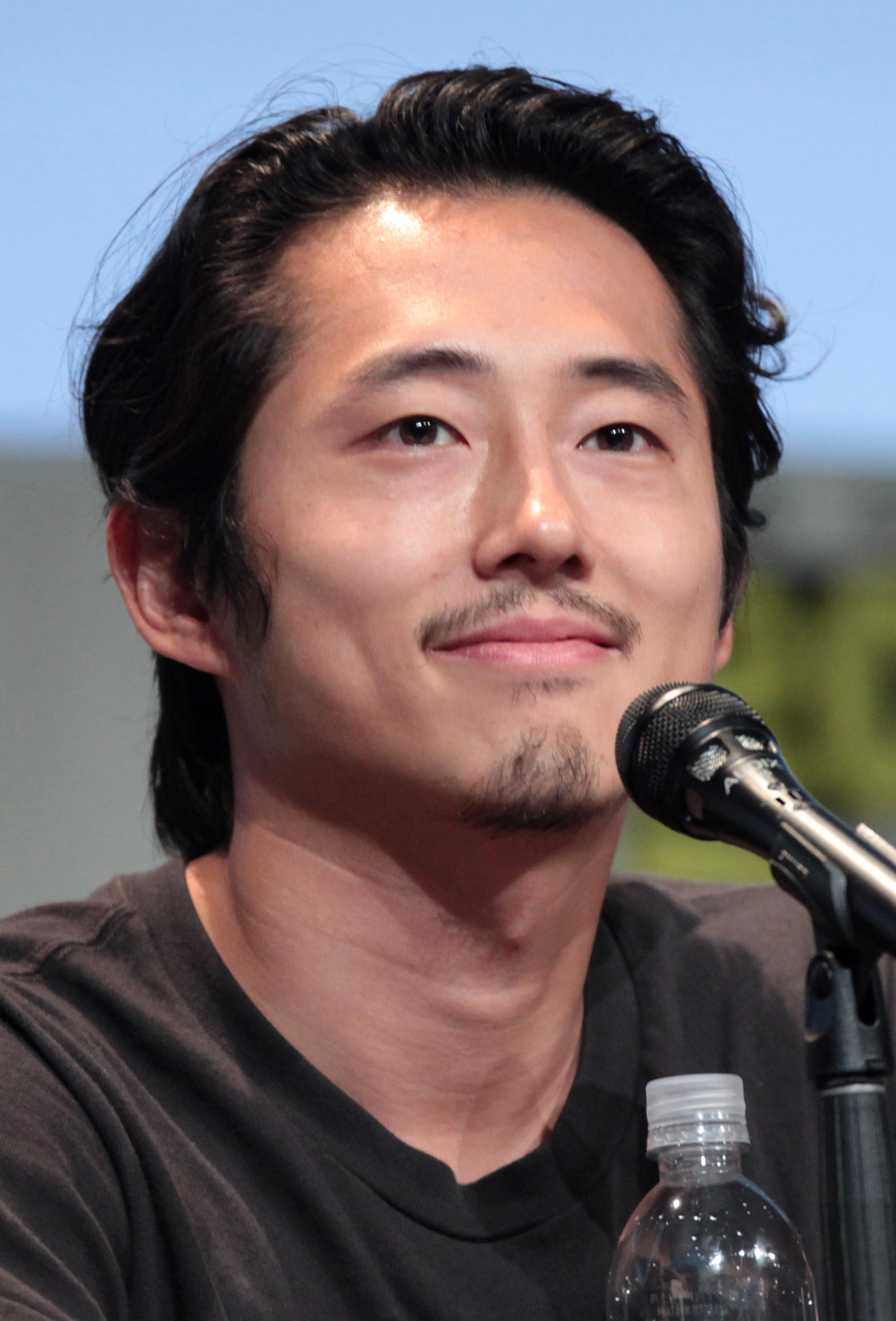
The film stars Daniel Kaluuya, Keke Palmer, and Steven Yeun.
- Daniel Kaluuya as Otis "OJ" Haywood Jr., the son of Otis Haywood Sr., and the older brother of Emerald.
- Keke Palmer as Emerald "Em" Haywood, the daughter of Otis Haywood Sr., and the charismatic younger sister of Otis Jr.
- Steven Yeun as Ricky "Jupe" Park, a former child actor and owner/creator of the theme park "Jupiter's Claim"
  - Jacob Kim as young Ricky "Jupe" Park, who plays Mikey Houston on Gordy's Home
- Michael Wincott as Antlers Holst, a renowned cinematographer
- Brandon Perea as Angel Torres, a tech salesman at Fry's Electronics
- Wrenn Schmidt as Amber Park, Jupe's wife
- Barbie Ferreira as Nessie, Angel's co-worker at Fry's
- Terry Notary as Gordy, a chimpanzee and star of the sitcom Gordy's Home
- Devon Graye as Ryder Muybridge, a paparazzo who rides an electric bike
- Donna Mills as Bonnie Clayton, a commercial actress
- Osgood Perkins as Fynn Bachman, a commercial director
- Eddie Jemison as Buster, a crew member on the commercial
- Keith David as Otis Haywood Sr., the owner of Haywood's Hollywood Horses Ranch
- Sophia Coto as Mary Jo Elliott, who plays Haley Houston on Gordy's Home
  - Haley Babula as Mary Jo Elliott (adult)
- Jennifer Lafleur as Phyllis Mayberry, who plays Margaret Houston on Gordy's Home
- Andrew Patrick Ralston as Tom Bogan, who plays Brett Houston on Gordy's Home

== Themes and interpretations ==
"The villain is this otherworldly threat. And it is also something that everyone has in common—everyone's relationship to the spectacle."

— Writer-director Jordan Peele

The film has been described as containing themes related to spectacle and exploitation. GQ's Gerrick D. Kennedy wrote that Nope "is a movie about spectacle. More specifically, our addiction to spectacle [...] Nope is about holding a mirror up to all of us and our inability to look away from drama or peril." Kennedy also states that "the erasure of [B]lack contributions" to the history of filmmaking plays a significant role in the film. Writer-director Jordan Peele was partly inspired to write Nope by the COVID-19 lockdowns and the "endless cycle of grim, inescapable tragedy" in 2020.

Richard Brody of The New Yorker considered Nope to be a film about exploitation and the cinematic history of exploitation in film; he wrote that he thought the premise of the film was "acknowledging and extending cinema's legacy while also redressing its omissions and misrepresentations of history." Brody also noted that the film's action "pivots on the power and the nature of movie technology," and felt that the film critiqued computer-generated imagery (CGI) in its TV commercial production scene, writing, "Peele presents [CGI] as a dubious temptation and a form of dangerous power." Brody interpreted the choice to have the space creatures target a Black-owned horse farm as "a sardonic vision of the universality of racism."

Los Angeles Times writer Jen Yamato noted that Steven Yeun's Ricky "Jupe" Park attempts to profit off of Jean Jacket with his "Star Lasso Experience" show, falsely believing that, because he survived the Gordy incident, he shares a similar kinship with Jean Jacket. Zosha Millman of Polygon argues that Jupe's belief that Gordy and Jean Jacket are well-intentioned, despite their capacity to be unpredictable and dangerous, contrasts with the life experience of Daniel Kaluuya's OJ, "who grew up around unruly animals that it was his job to tame. As a horse trainer, he knows that animals are worthy of our respect. But it's not part of a grand design, or born from a special relationship with the horse. It's an animal, and it could kill you — but it can be tamed and worked with, if you know what you're doing." Discussing Jupe's fate, Michael Wincott's character, Antlers Holst, makes mention of Siegfried & Roy — a duo known for training white lions and white tigers — the latter of whom was attacked and severely injured by one of his tigers. GameRevolution's Jason Faulkner further noted "Peele quoting Neon Genesis Evangelion's Angels as the principal inspiration for the film and the monster within", and of the true meaning of Jean Jacket's true form's resemblance to the biblical description of angels; he notes the verse from Nahum ("I will cast abominable filth at you, make you vile, and make you a spectacle." Nahum 3:6) prefacing the film as indicative of Peele's thoughts on the Bible, and how if one "think[s] about the way [Jean Jacket] feeds and the concept of people ascending to heaven, [one can] connect the dots [that] Jean Jacket['s species has] been with humanity for a long time, and an attack from one of the creatures could [be] misinterpreted as something from the divine."

When watching Gordy move about the wrecked set of Gordy's Home, Jupe notices one of his co-star's shoes inexplicably standing upright; as an adult, Jupe has the shoe on display in his room of Gordy's Home mementos. Millman, along with Cooper Hood of Screen Rant, identify the mysteriously standing shoe as a possible example of a "bad miracle", a label which OJ uses when he and Keke Palmer's Emerald learn that they are seemingly dealing with a UFO. Hood writes that the shoe standing up can be viewed as a "bad miracle" due to "the unexplainable nature of the phenomenon and how it happened during a tragedy. It plays into the movie's theme of turning tragic events into a spectacle, as Ricky is profiting off the collectible despite the trauma of its circumstances." Yamato, however, questions if Jupe "merely imagine[d] the shoe standing impossibly in the air — and is he misremembering that just before being shot, Gordy turned to him in friendship?" Yamato asserts that Jupe has disguised his trauma from the incident "under a veneer of capitalist hustle and humor", and characterizes Jupe's experience as a child actor as one in which he was "exploited and then spit out by the fame machine [...] and this sets him up to make the fatal mistake of underestimating a creature that's too dangerous to wrangle." The scene itself would go on to be nominated for Best Scene at the 2022 St. Louis Gateway Film Critics Association Awards, and the shot from it of Gordy and young Jupe's fists appearing to come close to a fist bump was named by Adam Nayman of The Ringer as one of the best shots of 2022, comparing it positively to Michelangelo's The Creation of Adam and relating it to "the feeling to recoil from an outstretched hand, especially one powerful enough to rip you limb from limb." The sequence was also named one of the best movie scenes of 2022 by Wes Greene of Slant Magazine.

== Production ==
=== Development ===
On October 1, 2019, Universal Pictures announced a five-year exclusive production partnership with Peele's Monkeypaw Productions. Nope, then an untitled project, was announced on November 9, 2020, with Peele set to write, direct and produce. He said, "I wrote it in a time when we were a little bit worried about the future of cinema. So the first thing I knew is I wanted to create a spectacle. I wanted to create something that the audience would have to come see." Speaking to GQ, Peele stated, "So much of what this world was experiencing was this overload of spectacle, and kind of a low point of our addiction to spectacle." He added that he "wrote [the film] trapped inside, and so I knew I wanted to make something that was about the sky. I knew the world would want to be outside and at the same time, I knew we had this newfound fear from this trauma, from this time of what it meant to go outside. Can we go outside? So I slipped some of that stuff in."

Peele publicly cited King Kong and Jurassic Park, movies about humanity's addiction to spectacle, along with Close Encounters of the Third Kind, Signs, and The Wizard of Oz as influences in his writing. He later identified the Angels of Neon Genesis Evangelion as the principal inspiration for the film's premise and monster in the film's production notes, impressed by the "hyper minimalism" and "biomechanical design flair" of Sahaquiel, the 10th Angel. He explained his decision to include a major focus on clouds in the film: "The beauty of the sky is enthralling—the first movies, in a way. Every now and then you'll see a cloud that sits alone and is too low, and it gives me this vertigo and this sense of Presence with a capital P. I can't describe it, but I knew if I could bottle that and put it into a horror movie, it might change the way people look at the sky."

Peele originally wrote the character of Angel Torres as a "happy-go-lucky" geek-like character until Brandon Perea was cast as the character, who wanted to expand upon the character and portray him as more grounded.

In February 2021, it was reported that Keke Palmer and Daniel Kaluuya had joined the cast, while Jesse Plemons turned down a role in favor of starring in Killers of the Flower Moon. Peele wrote the script with Kaluuya in mind for the role of OJ Haywood. Kaluuya was paid $4 million for his involvement. In March, Steven Yeun was added to the cast.

=== Filming ===
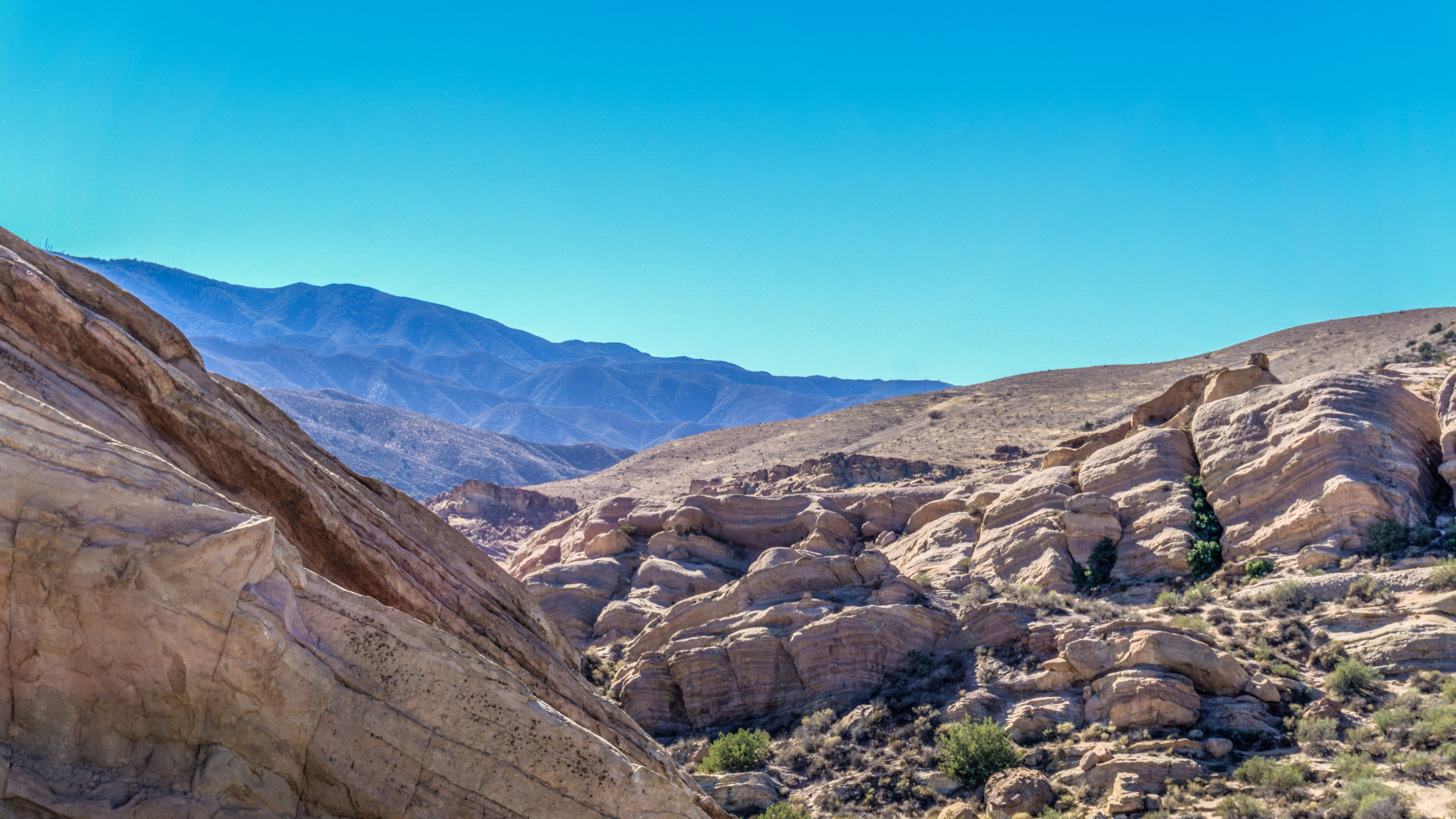
The film was shot in Agua Dulce, California.

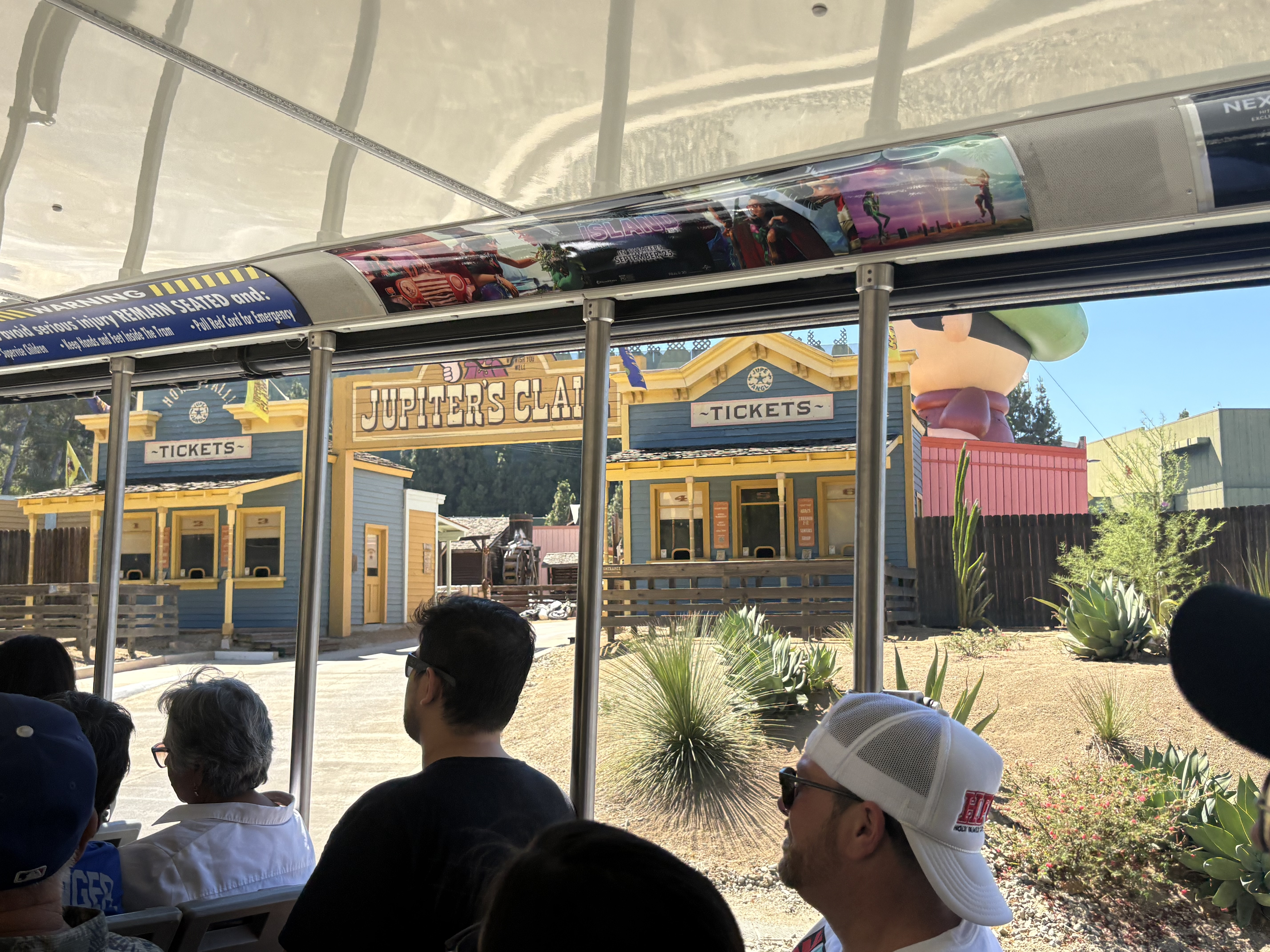
The set for Jupiter's Claim, taken on Studio Tour at Universal Studios Hollywood

Principal photography took place from June to November 2021 in the Agua Dulce desert in northern Los Angeles County. The production received an estimated $8,364,000 worth of tax credits to shoot in the state of California. The film was shot on a budget of $68 million after tax incentives. It was the first to employ trainees (in this case, six) from Universal Filmed Entertainment Group's California Below-the-Line Traineeship for individuals seeking careers behind the camera. Nope was shot by cinematographer Hoyte van Hoytema using Kodak film, including 65mm film in IMAX, making it the first horror film in history to be shot in this format. Two cameras were used for the nighttime scenes — one for infrared light with narrow bandwidth, and another that captured 70mm film. The overlaid images from these two were then added to the information captured from the film camera, creating the needed footage. On July 22, 2021, Peele revealed the film's title and shared its first promotional release poster, and further castings were confirmed. Peele chose Nope as the title because he wanted to acknowledge movie audiences and their expected reactions to the film. He said he had considered calling the film Little Green Men to reference a theme in the film of humanity's "monetization of spectacle". Filming also took place at the Burbank, California location of Fry's Electronics, which had closed along with all remaining Fry's locations several weeks before filming. The store was recreated in its operating state for filming. Fry's co-founder Randy Fry and his wife, reporter Vicki Liviakis, were present during filming at the Burbank store; they also had a cameo appearance at the Star Lasso Experience scene, which they filmed in two days.

The 1972 Western film Buck and the Preacher, starring Sidney Poitier, is featured throughout the film; Peele said it was "the first film that I know of that had Black cowboys represented in it. The myth that cowboys were just white guys running around, it's just not true, but we don't know that because of Hollywood and the romanticized view of a very brutalized era. The film, it shares a spirit." For her introductory scene, which also opens the film's first trailer, Palmer shot 14 takes of Emerald's monologue about her and OJ's family's history, which initially was not in the script prior to principal photography. Peele described each take as "... very wildly different, uncuttably so. But just a tour de force, one of these things where you see somebody like, 'I'm going to make this choice this time and go for it.' There's improv in there."

=== Creature design ===
"Jean Jacket"
- Nope race
- Jean Jacket in its UFO form chasing OJ Haywood (Daniel Kaluuya) during the film's climax.
- Created by: Jordan Peele, John Dabiri, et al.
- Based on: Sand dollar (body), Cuttlefish (camouflage), Octopus (eye), Bird (gizzard), electric eels and ghost knifefish (bioelectricity), Jellyfish (peacocking)

In-universe information
- Other name: Occulonimbus edoequus
- Distinctions: Appears as Flying saucer, Cloud when camouflaged; or Jellyfish when peacocking

Caltech professor John O. Dabiri collaborated with Peele and his team on the design of the Jean Jacket monster's UFO form, and in particular its final true "biblical angel" form, which was inspired by those of Neon Genesis Evangelion and invertebrate aquatic locomotion among sea creatures such as jellyfish, octopuses, and squid, to imagine a hypothetical undiscovered previously extinct sky predator, realistically imagining "how could something like this hide in the clouds", with its ability to "generate electric field" taken from electric eels and ghost knifefish, allowing for electric propulsion ("Jean Jacket's fast flying without wings/sails"). Guillaume Rocheron of Moving Picture Company (MPC) also worked with Dabiri and Peele on the visual effects shots featuring Jean Jacket, using both CGI and practical effects, the latter particularly involving the use of a helicopter to swirl the dust and dirt on the ground the way the creature does when consuming its victims in the film. The film held its first test screenings just 12 weeks before its July 22 release, with the special effects still being worked on.

The design for Jean Jacket's "biblical" form has also been compared to Orga, the "final form" of the Millennium alien species in the Godzilla 2000 movie, who are also living UFOs.

=== Costumes ===
Costume designer Alex Bovaird employed a "method approach" to create the characters' wardrobes, using 1990s sitcoms, indie rock bands, and the 1985 film The Goonies as inspiration. To match the film's Californian setting, Bovaird, Peele and their teams decided to create a contrast between "super neon colors against the desert backdrop," and make the film's main characters "look like action heroes, but cool ones." For OJ and Emerald's outfits, Bovaird went against the clichés of how horse ranchers would dress and gave them casual clothes, an example being OJ's orange The Scorpion King crew hoodie, along with portraying Emerald as "tomboy-like" by having her wear clothing that she and OJ may have "left at the ranch." Bovaird saw the character of Angel Torres as "a bit of a cynical, angry guy" and some sort of "Latin-emo," but still "perky" due to his being a comic relief character, so he dressed him with a dark-colored palette that gets lighter as the film progresses, using band tees, cut-offs and Vans. Ricky "Jupe" Park's red cowboy suit that he wears in the Star Lasso Experience scene almost did not make the cut, for Bovaird was unsure if Peele wanted to go "bold". For the costume of Gordy, Bovaird and her team dressed human actor Terry Notary in a cardigan sweatshirt in the vein of the one Andy (Kerri Green) wore in The Goonies, with yellow and black stripes. Notary's actions were then transferred to the CGI chimpanzee created in post-production.

=== Sound design ===
Sound designer Johnnie Burn said in an interview with IndieWire, "Jordan Peele is a director who really knows how to write for sound." He continued, "The early conversations were along the lines of 'We want to be super realistic.'...And for that, we were kind of resisting the urge to hear anything from the monster too early on, because we wanted it to be credible that this was a predator—and how could something so large be getting away with this if it was making a big noise? ... One of the main sounds we used was silence." Burn represented Jean Jacket's presence in the environment by stripping back layers, such as dialogue, wind, and the chirping of crickets. He additionally engineered wind soundscapes containing faint, obscured sounds, such as screams, to suggest Jean Jacket's movement through the air. The soundtrack was mixed in Dolby Atmos.

=== Music ===
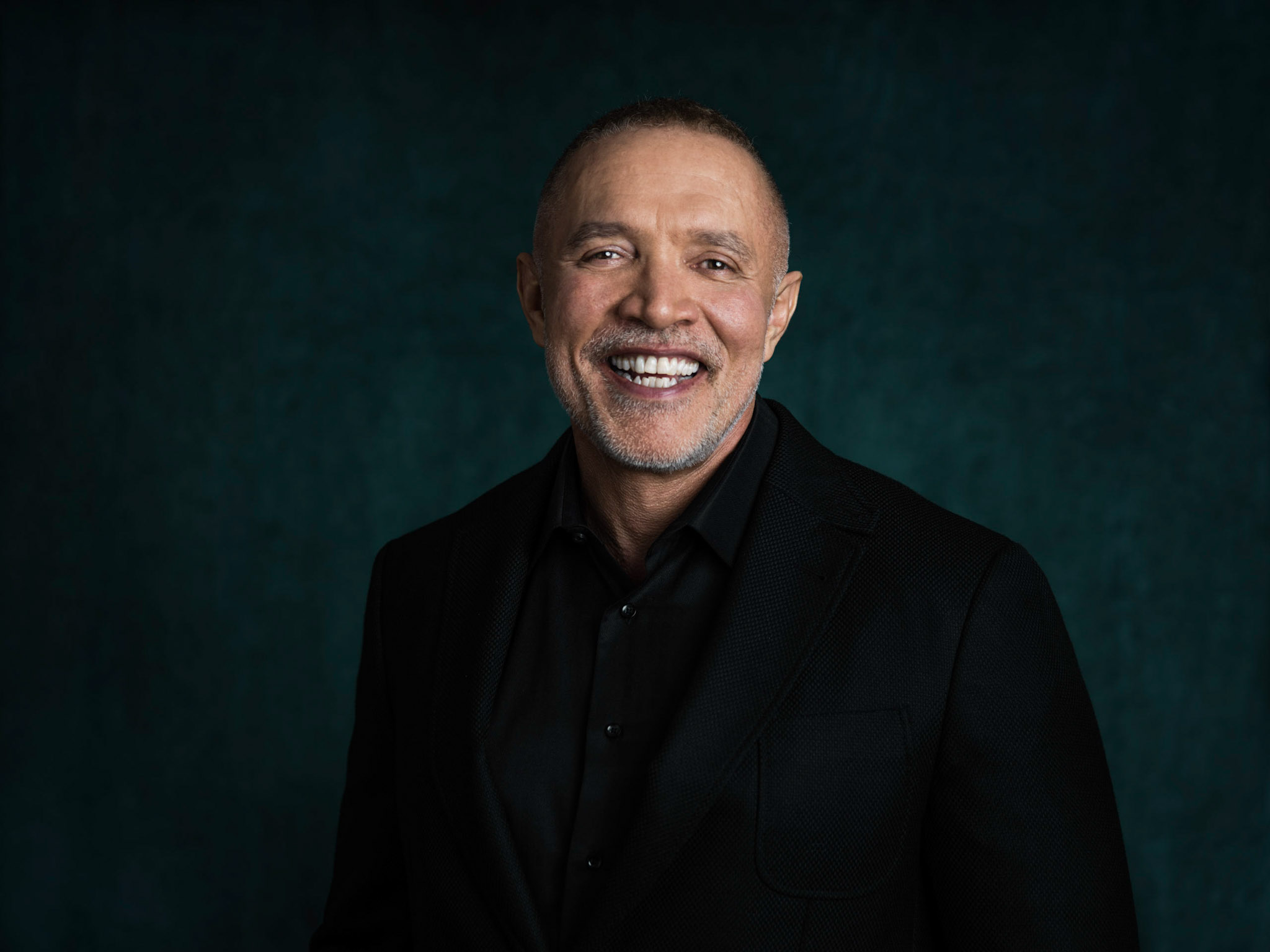
Michael Abels composed the film's score.

The film's score was composed by Michael Abels, who had previously worked with Peele on Get Out (2017) and Us (2019). Abels described his score as having to meet the "threat level" described by Peele in the script and the ideas imposed by the film's quote "What's a bad miracle?" He added, "The music needs to have both those senses together. Both a little bit of a sense of awe like we would have looking at the Grand Canyon, but then also the urge to run far away from the Grand Canyon because falling in would not be good. That's the dichotomy that's present in the film [...] you hear a sense of a little bit of awe and magic, and then there's sheer terror. But then there's also a sense of a real epic adventure towards the end and giant music that accompanies a giant, historic adventure." Working with the film's sound designer Johnnie Burn, Abels felt that the use of silence played an important role in scoring the film, saying, "The tension between the negative space and the music is actually part of the music. Leaving room for the sound design, even when there's a cue playing, was an important part of the way I approached it. A lot of times in the scariest parts, especially in the earlier parts of this film, you're listening to what you hope you're not going to hear or what you thought you might have heard. The stillness allows you to freak out in that way."

The soundtrack album was released by Back Lot Music on July 22, 2022, the same day as the film. The score album also features a screwed version of Corey Hart's "Sunglasses at Night". Additionally, the film features the songs "Walk On By" by Dionne Warwick, "Strange Animal" by Lawrence Gowan, "This Is the Lost Generation" by the Lost Generation, and "Exuma, the Obeah Man" by Exuma.

== Marketing ==
The release of a teaser poster in July 2021 and first-look images in February 2022 were followed by a trailer on February 13, 2022. The trailer, which featured the 1962 Regal Theater recording of Stevie Wonder's "Fingertips", was praised by critics for simultaneously creating suspense and keeping the storyline under wraps; some reviewers began to speculate the film would be about extraterrestrial life. Jeremy Mathai of /Film said it "immediately lit the internet on fire and sent fans scurrying for answers as to whether the main antagonist of the film could really be alien invaders from outer space or if Peele has yet another trick up his sleeve". Jordan Hoffman from Vanity Fair said he enjoyed the song choice and an included static shot with scrolling text, which he compared to a similar shot in the trailer for Stanley Kubrick's The Shining. The Verge's Charles Pulliam-Moore called it "one of the rare modern movies with this much hype around it to make it this close to its release date without the public knowing basically anything about it." The trailer was also broadcast during Super Bowl LVI, and it earned 86 million views across social media websites during the 24 hours after it aired.

A second poster showing a floating horse was released on March 1, 2022. Bloody Disgusting's John Squires said it was "entirely possible that Nope isn't at all the movie it thus far appears to be, with the marketing throwing us off the scent." Lex Briscuso from /Film said that "despite the fact that the new visual doesn't give us very many fresh clues, I'm just happy to see new content continue to pop up out of the blue". On April 16, the NBA Playoffs cross-promoted the film with a clip starring NBA player Stephen Curry. Larry Fitzmaurice of BuzzFeed called it "terrifyingly funny". On April 27, additional footage was shown to around 3,000 exhibition insiders at CinemaCon; Peele asked attendees to be discreet and not reveal any detail about the story. This footage, depicting several characters saying a variation of the word "nope", was later aired as a 30-second television spot during the NBA Finals, confirming the existence of UFOs in the film. Jeremy Methai of /Film called it "thrilling" and noted similarities to the filmography of Steven Spielberg while expressing his belief that "there's something much more going on underneath beyond the extremely easy answer of extraterrestrials terrorizing our helpless protagonists." Four character posters were released on June 7, 2022, with a featurette released the next day. The final trailer was released on June 9, 2022, featuring the Undisputed Truth's 1971 rendition of the Temptations' "Ball of Confusion". Reviewers noted its lighter tone and said it did a better job at explaining the premise. Justin Carter of Gizmodo said it was reasonable to believe the trailer shared too much information, inadvertently robbing audiences from any potential mystery in the story.

IMAX and Dolby posters were released by the end of June 2022. On July 1, an interactive website for Jupiter's Claim, the fictional theme park Yeun's character owns in the film, was published; in addition to providing hints of the plot, it held weekly drawings with in-world prizes. Valerie Ettenhofer of /Film compared a poster on the website for a fictional film titled Kid Sheriff to the poster for the 2003 comedy film Holes. She described the website as "wonderfully interactive, sort of like an old Flash game site, but it also gives some insight into what Nope might be about." A real-world version of Jupiter's Claim was added permanently as a part of Universal Studios Hollywood's Studio Tour on July 22, making it the first Studio Tour attraction to open the same day the movie it replicates opens in theaters, the other addition to the attraction is the atmosphere such as the lights and tube men flicker off while the sound of the alien be heard and the actors starting to panic then begin to look up. On July 24, 2022, Peele released the intro to Gordy's Home, the fictional sitcom depicted in the film, on his Twitter account.

== Release ==
Nope premiered at the TCL Chinese Theatre in Los Angeles on July 18, 2022. It was released in theaters in the United States on July 22, 2022, by Universal Pictures, a date first revealed in November 2020. The Alamo Drafthouse Cinema hosted an outdoor screening of the film at Sunset Ranch Hollywood on July 25, 2022.

It screened at the Cinesphere in IMAX on September 12, 2022, during the Toronto International Film Festival as a special presentation in the main film slate with a pre-film Q&A session with Jordan Peele and Hoyte van Hoytema, despite being released to the public prior to the festival.

== Home media ==
The film was released to VOD on August 26, 2022. It was released on 4K UHD, Blu-ray, and DVD on October 25, 2022. It was released to streaming on Peacock on November 18, 2022, as part of an 18-month deal where it streamed on Peacock for four months and moved to Amazon Prime for the next ten months. It then moved back to Peacock for the final four.

== Reception ==
=== Box office ===
Nope grossed $123.3 million in the United States and Canada, and $48 million in other territories, for a worldwide total of $171.2 million.

In the United States and Canada, Nope was projected to gross around $50 million from 3,785 theaters in its opening weekend. It made $19.5 million on its opening day, including $6.4 million (down 14% from the $7.4 million earned by Peele's 2019 film Us) from Thursday night previews. It went on to debut to $44.4 million, topping the box office. It also posted the best opening weekend for an original film since Us. While the film came in on the low-end of projections, Deadline Hollywood still deemed it a success, noting its opening was higher than Once Upon a Time in Hollywood ($41 million), another R-rated original film released in July 2019, as well as its Friday-to-Saturday gross not steeply declining, indicating possible legs at the box office. Deadline also reported that despite failing to meet Universal's $50 million opening threshold for a longer 31-day theatrical window before going to premium video on demand, (Note: Universal's deals with theater chains allows them to send films that open to under $50 million to premium video on demand after a 17-day theatrical window.) Universal would still honor the longer window for the film. The film dropped 58% in its sophomore weekend to $18.6 million, finishing second behind newcomer DC League of Super-Pets. It finished third and fifth the following two weekends, with $8.5 million and $5.3 million, respectively. On August 9, 2022, during its third week, the film crossed the $100 million milestone in the United States and Canada, making it the first R-rated film to pass the milestone since Bad Boys for Life in January 2020. It also surpassed Universal's other horror film Halloween Kills ($92 million in the United States and Canada) to become the highest grossing R-rated film in the United States and Canada during the pandemic.

=== Critical response ===
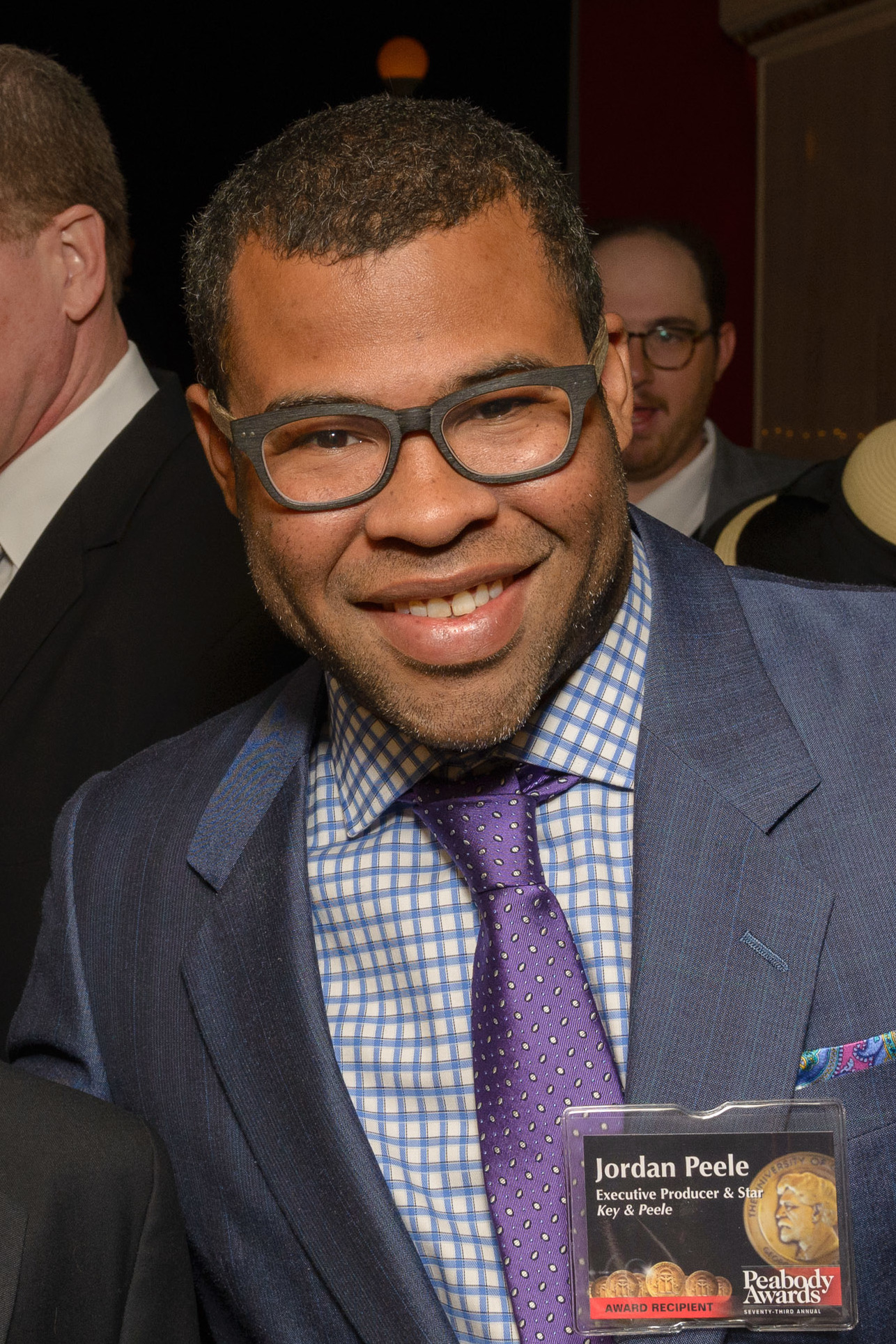
Jordan Peele received praise for his direction.

On the review aggregator website Rotten Tomatoes, 83% of 476 critics' reviews are positive, with an average rating of 7.5/10. The website's consensus reads: "Admirable for its originality and ambition even when its reach exceeds its grasp, Nope adds Spielbergian spectacle to Jordan Peele's growing arsenal." Metacritic, which uses a weighted average, assigned the film a score of 77 out of 100, based on 64 critics, indicating "generally favorable" reviews. Audiences polled by CinemaScore gave the film an average grade of "B" on an A+ to F scale, the same score as Us, while PostTrak reported 79% of filmgoers gave it a positive score.

A. O. Scott of The New York Times praised the film's "impeccably managed suspense, sharp jokes and a beguiling, unnerving atmosphere of all-around weirdness", and noted that, "While this movie can fairly be described as Spielbergian, it turns on an emphatic and explicit debunking of Spielberg's most characteristic visual trope: the awe-struck upward gaze." Richard Roeper of the Chicago Sun-Times gave the film a score of four out of four stars, calling it "an exhilarating piece of cinema filled with memorable characters," and "a classic example of a bold and original film that pays homage to a seemingly endless stream of great movies, and yet, is more than the sum of its parts." Odie Henderson, writing for RogerEbert.com, gave the film three-and-a-half out of four stars, commending the film's sound mixing and calling it "definitely Peele's creepiest movie," and writing that Peele himself "remains a master of misdirection."

David Sims of The Atlantic wrote that "Nope is tinged with the acidic satire that suffused [Peele's] previous two movies, as Peele examines why the easiest way to process horror these days is to turn it into breathtaking entertainment." Likewise, Michael Shindler of The American Spectator singled out Holst as a "polite caricature" of Werner Herzog, highlighting how the latter contrasts favorably with the film's heroes, and noted that Peele "resists the temptation to warp the plot into a hackneyed morality play," instead playing "the story straight" in the vein of Paul Verhoeven's Starship Troopers.

Chris Evangelista of /Film wrote that "Nope may not be Jordan Peele's best movie to date, but it is his most enjoyable. A true summer movie spectacle meant to be writ large across the screen, giving us thrills, chills, laughs, and that most precious of things: movie magic." David Ehrlich of IndieWire praised the film, saying "It doesn't hurt that Peele's latest boasts some of the most inspired [movie monster] design since H. R. Giger left his mark on the genre, or that Kaluuya's eyes remain some of Hollywood's most special effects, as Nope gets almost as much mileage from their weariness as Get Out squeezed from their clarity. It's through them that Nope searches for a new way of seeing, returns the Haywoods to their rightful place in film history, and creates the rare Hollywood spectacle that doesn't leave us looking for more." Screen Rant's Ben Kendrick called it "a love letter to filmmaking" and called Brandon Perea's portrayal of Angel Torres a "stand-out" among the supporting cast, while praising Kaluuya and Palmer's performances.

Richard Lawson of Vanity Fair was mixed about the film, saying "As Nope swerves and reels, it often seems distracted by itself, unable to hold its focus on any one thing long enough for deeper meaning, or feeling, to coalesce." Alonso Duralde of TheWrap wrote "This ultimately feels like four very promising movies mashed together, with spectacular highlights bumping into each other in a way that's ultimately lacking, even as they all demonstrate the prowess and bravado of the filmmaker." Peter Bradshaw of The Guardian gave the film two out of five stars, writing, "There is something clotted and heavy about this film, with sadly not enough of the humour for which Peele justly became celebrated in his double-act days with Keegan-Michael Key."

Argentine filmmaker Andy Muschietti praised the film, saying "It's quite unusual that a filmmaker uses the themes of his movie to create an experiential game with the audience. That is what Jordan Peele does so well in Nope. The "addiction to spectacle" is not only a subtextual idea in the story but more importantly a very intentional exercise of tension that he puts the spectators through."

=== Retrospective lists ===
In 2023, it ranked number 21 on IndieWire's list of films with "The Best Cinematography of the 21st Century," noting that the visuals gave the film "a unique sense of grandeur and mounting terror". The site also listed it at number 8 on its list of the "62 Best Science Fiction Films of the 21st Century," number 4 on its list of the "25 Scariest Alien Movies of All Time" and number 12 on its list of "The 100 Best Movies of the 2020s (So Far)." Michael Abels' score also ranked number 2 on the site's list of the best film scores of 2022.

Comic Book Resources ranked it at number 10 on its list of the "10 Best Horror Movies of the 2020s (So Far)," writing that "There's no denying the genius-level storytelling that went into the making of Nope and its many layers that blend social satire with an overwhelming sense of dread and mystery. Nope is a mixture of the best parts of Alien and Jaws rolled into a movie that features one of the most unique creature features of the last twenty years. The fear of the unknown surrounding the creature and its unstoppable nature make for a wild ride in Nope that any horror fan will appreciate for its distinctive style." The site also called Jean Jacket one of the "best movie monsters of the 21st century", noting the UFO creature's unpredictability and positively comparing it to the shark from Jaws. Far Out also listed the film as one of the "10 Best Sci-Fi Movies of the 21st Century", writing that it showcases Peele's "unrestrained imagination in all the best ways" and praised Jean Jacket's appearance as "one of, if not the most, imaginative and singular alien creature designs in cinema history". MovieWeb ranked it as the "Best Alien Invasion Movie of the 21st Century (So Far)", writing that the "cinematography, sound design, and creature design are among the reasons that make this one of the best alien films in recent cinema". Marie Claire also included it on its list of "The 100 Best Movies of All Time".

On January 1, 2024, Rolling Stone ranked it at number 78 on its inaugural list of "The 150 Best Sci-Fi Movies of All Time," writing "Jordan Peele's third movie could be described as an alien invasion tale in the spirit of War of the Worlds. But that shorthand would miss wonderfully peculiar touches like a Black family that's wrangled horses for showbiz since the dawn of cinema or a Gold Rush-themed amusement park or sitcom cancelled after an on-set rampage by a chimpanzee. A flying saucer isn't secondary to all these elements, but Nope puts the threat of a UFO on the same uncanny footing as the Hollywood outsiders and misfits who have been summoned to combat it. For Peele to pack these ideas into a sci-fi summer blockbuster that still delivers is, frankly, a 21st-century auteur flex." In 2025, it was one of the films voted for the "Readers' Choice" edition of The New York Times' list of "The 100 Best Movies of the 21st Century," finishing at number 104.

=== Accolades ===
Award	Date of ceremony	Category	Recipient(s)	Result	Ref.
American Film Institute Awards	December 9, 2022	Top 10 Films of the Year	Nope	Won	
Art Directors Guild Awards	February 18, 2023	Excellence in Production Design for a Fantasy Film	Ruth De Jong	Nominated	
ASCAP Awards	May 15, 2023	Film Score of the Year	Michael Abels	Won	
Austin Film Critics Association	January 10, 2023	Best Supporting Actress	Keke Palmer	Nominated	
Austin Film Critics Association	January 10, 2023	Best Original Screenplay	Jordan Peele	Nominated	
Austin Film Critics Association	January 10, 2023	Best Cinematography	Hoyte van Hoytema	Nominated	
Australian Film Critics Association Awards	March 10, 2023	Best International Film (English Language)	Nope	Nominated	
BET Awards	June 25, 2023	Best Movie	Nope	Nominated	
BET Awards	June 25, 2023	Best Actor	Daniel Kaluuya	Nominated	
BET Awards	June 25, 2023	Best Actress	Keke Palmer	Nominated (Note: Also for Human Resources)	
Black Reel Awards	February 6, 2023	Outstanding Motion Picture	Jordan Peele and Ian Cooper	Nominated	
Black Reel Awards	February 6, 2023	Outstanding Director	Jordan Peele	Nominated	
Black Reel Awards	February 6, 2023	Outstanding Actor	Daniel Kaluuya	Nominated	
Black Reel Awards	February 6, 2023	Outstanding Supporting Actress	Keke Palmer	Nominated	
Black Reel Awards	February 6, 2023	Outstanding Screenplay	Jordan Peele	Nominated	
Black Reel Awards	February 6, 2023	Outstanding Score	Michael Abels	Nominated	
Black Reel Awards	February 6, 2023	Outstanding Cinematography	Hoyte van Hoytema	Won	
Black Reel Awards	February 6, 2023	Outstanding Production Design	Ruth de Jong	Nominated	
Chicago Film Critics Association	December 14, 2022	Best Use of Visual Effects	Nope	Nominated	
Critics' Choice Super Awards	March 16, 2023	Best Science Fiction/Fantasy Movie	Nope	Nominated	
Critics' Choice Super Awards	March 16, 2023	Best Actor in a Science Fiction/Fantasy Movie	Daniel Kaluuya	Nominated	
Critics' Choice Super Awards	March 16, 2023	Best Actress in a Science Fiction/Fantasy Movie	Keke Palmer	Nominated	
Costume Designers Guild Awards	February 27, 2023	Excellence in Contemporary Film	Alex Bovaird	Nominated	
Fangoria Chainsaw Awards	May 23, 2023	Best Wide Release	Nope	Nominated	
Fangoria Chainsaw Awards	May 23, 2023	Best Director	Jordan Peele	Won	
Fangoria Chainsaw Awards	May 23, 2023	Best Lead Performance	Daniel Kaluuya	Nominated	
Fangoria Chainsaw Awards	May 23, 2023	Best Lead Performance	Keke Palmer	Nominated	
Fangoria Chainsaw Awards	May 23, 2023	Best Supporting Performance	Steven Yeun	Nominated	
Fangoria Chainsaw Awards	May 23, 2023	Best Cinematography	Hoyte Van Hoytema	Won	
Fangoria Chainsaw Awards	May 23, 2023	Best Screenplay	Jordan Peele	Nominated	
Fangoria Chainsaw Awards	May 23, 2023	Best Score	Michael Abels	Nominated	
Fangoria Chainsaw Awards	May 23, 2023	Best Costume Design	Alex Bovaird	Nominated	
Fangoria Chainsaw Awards	May 23, 2023	Best Creature FX	Guillaume Rocheron	Nominated	
Florida Film Critics Circle	December 22, 2022	Best Score	Michael Abels	Runner-up	
Florida Film Critics Circle	December 22, 2022	Best Visual Effects	Nope	Runner-up	
Georgia Film Critics Association	January 13, 2023	Best Picture	Nope	Nominated	
Georgia Film Critics Association	January 13, 2023	Best Director	Jordan Peele	Nominated	
Georgia Film Critics Association	January 13, 2023	Best Supporting Actress	Keke Palmer	Nominated	
Georgia Film Critics Association	January 13, 2023	Best Original Screenplay	Jordan Peele	Nominated	
Georgia Film Critics Association	January 13, 2023	Best Cinematography	Hoyte van Hoytema	Nominated	
Georgia Film Critics Association	January 13, 2023	Best Original Score	Michael Abels	Nominated	
GLAAD Media Awards	March 30, 2023	Outstanding Film – Wide Release	Nope	Nominated	
Golden Reel Awards	February 26, 2023	Outstanding Achievement in Sound Editing – Feature Effects / Foley	Johnnie Burn, Simon Carroll, Brendan Feeney, Max Behrens, Ben Gulvin, Jeff Smith, Beresford Cookman, Natalia Lubowiecka, Ewa Mazurkiewicz, Jacek Wisniewski	Nominated	
Golden Trailer Awards	October 6, 2022	Best Horror	Nope (Buddha Jones)	Won	
Golden Trailer Awards	October 6, 2022	Best Horror TV Spot (for a Feature Film)	"Stampede" (Buddha Jones)	Won	
Golden Trailer Awards	June 29, 2023	Best Thriller	"Moment" (TRANSIT)	Nominated	
Golden Trailer Awards	June 29, 2023	Best Original Score TV Spot (for a Feature Film)	"Choices" (TRANSIT)	Nominated	
Golden Trailer Awards	June 29, 2023	Best Thriller TV Spot (for a Feature Film)	"Choices" (TRANSIT)	Won	
Golden Trailer Awards	June 29, 2023	Most Original TV Spot (for a Feature Film)	"Choices" (TRANSIT)	Nominated	
Golden Trailer Awards	June 29, 2023	Most Original TV Spot (for a Feature Film)	ESPN NBA Playoffs "Nope" (Framework Studio)	Nominated	
Golden Trailer Awards	June 29, 2023	Best Digital – Horror / Thriller	"Breathe Review" (TRANSIT)	Nominated	
Golden Trailer Awards	June 29, 2023	Best Horror / Thriller TrailerByte for a Feature Film	"Look Away" (Project X/AV)	Nominated	
Golden Trailer Awards	June 29, 2023	Best BTS/EPK for a Feature Film (Over 2 minutes)	"Shadows" (SunnyBoy Entertainment)	Nominated	
Hollywood Critics Association Midseason Film Awards	July 1, 2022	Most Anticipated Film	Nope	Won	
Hollywood Critics Association Awards	February 24, 2023	Best Horror Film	Nope	Nominated	
Hollywood Critics Association Awards	February 24, 2023	Best Supporting Actress	Keke Palmer	Nominated	
Hollywood Critics Association Creative Arts Awards	February 24, 2023	Best Marketing Campaign	Nope	Nominated	
Hollywood Critics Association Creative Arts Awards	February 24, 2023	Best Sound	Johnnie Burn and José Antonio Garcia	Nominated	
Hollywood Music in Media Awards	November 16, 2022	Best Original Score in a Horror Film	Michael Abels	Won	
Houston Film Critics Society	February 18, 2023	Best Cinematography	Hoyte van Hoytema	Nominated	
Hugo Awards	October 18–22, 2023	Best Dramatic Presentation, Long Form	Jordan Peele	Nominated	
ICG Publicists Awards	March 10, 2023	Maxwell Weinberg Publicists Showmanship Motion Picture Award	Nope	Nominated	
International Film Music Critics Association Awards	February 23, 2023	Best Original Score for a Fantasy/Science Fiction/Horror Film	Michael Abels	Won	
Los Angeles Film Critics Association	December 11, 2022	Best Cinematography	Hoyte van Hoytema	Runner-up	
Make-Up Artists and Hair Stylists Guild	February 11, 2023	Best Contemporary Make-Up in a Feature-Length Motion Picture	Shutchai Tym Buacharern, Jennifer Zide-Essex, Eleanor Sabaduquia, Kato De Stefan	Nominated	
MOBO Awards	November 30, 2022	Best Performance in a TV Show/Film	Daniel Kaluuya	Nominated	
MTV Movie & TV Awards	May 7, 2023	Best Movie	Nope	Nominated	
MTV Movie & TV Awards	May 7, 2023	Best Performance in a Movie	Keke Palmer	Nominated	
MTV Movie & TV Awards	May 7, 2023	Best Comedic Performance	Keke Palmer	Nominated	
NAACP Image Awards	February 25, 2023	Outstanding Writing in a Motion Picture	Jordan Peele	Nominated	
NAACP Image Awards	February 25, 2023	Outstanding Actor in a Motion Picture	Daniel Kaluuya	Nominated	
National Society of Film Critics	January 7, 2023	Best Cinematography	Hoyte van Hoytema	Runner-up	
New York Film Critics Circle Awards	December 2, 2022	Best Supporting Actress	Keke Palmer	Won	
New York Film Critics Online	December 11, 2022	Best Cinematography	Hoyte van Hoytema	Won	
Online Film Critics Society	January 23, 2023	Best Picture	Nope	5th place	
Online Film Critics Society	January 23, 2023	Best Original Screenplay	Jordan Peele	Nominated	
Online Film Critics Society	January 23, 2023	Best Cinematography	Hoyte van Hoytema	Nominated	
Online Film Critics Society	January 23, 2023	Best Visual Effects	Nope	Nominated	
People's Choice Awards	December 6, 2022	The Movie of 2022	Nope	Nominated	
People's Choice Awards	December 6, 2022	The Drama Movie of 2022	Nope	Nominated	
People's Choice Awards	December 6, 2022	The Male Movie Star of 2022	Daniel Kaluuya	Nominated	
People's Choice Awards	December 6, 2022	The Drama Movie Star of 2022	Daniel Kaluuya	Nominated	
People's Choice Awards	December 6, 2022	The Drama Movie Star of 2022	Keke Palmer	Nominated	
People's Choice Awards	December 6, 2022	The Female Movie Star of 2022	Keke Palmer	Nominated	
Saturn Awards	October 25, 2022	Best Science Fiction Film	Nope	Won	
Saturn Awards	October 25, 2022	Best Actor	Daniel Kaluuya	Nominated	
Saturn Awards	October 25, 2022	Best Actress	Keke Palmer	Nominated	
Saturn Awards	October 25, 2022	Best Director	Jordan Peele	Nominated	
Saturn Awards	October 25, 2022	Best Writing	Jordan Peele	Nominated	
Saturn Awards	October 25, 2022	Best Music	Michael Abels	Nominated	
Saturn Awards	October 25, 2022	Best Editing	Nicholas Monsour	Nominated	
Seattle Film Critics Society	January 17, 2023	Best Picture	Nope	Nominated	
Seattle Film Critics Society	January 17, 2023	Best Actress in a Supporting Role	Keke Palmer	Nominated	
Seattle Film Critics Society	January 17, 2023	Best Cinematography	Hoyte van Hoytema	Nominated	
Seattle Film Critics Society	January 17, 2023	Best Original Score	Michael Abels	Nominated	
Seattle Film Critics Society	January 17, 2023	Best Visual Effects	Guillaume Rocheron, Jeremy Robert, Sreejith Venugopalan, Scott R. Fisher	Nominated	
Seattle Film Critics Society	January 17, 2023	Best Villain	Jean Jacket	Nominated	
St. Louis Gateway Film Critics Association	December 18, 2022	Best Horror Film	Nope	Won	
St. Louis Gateway Film Critics Association	December 18, 2022	Best Cinematography	Hoyte van Hoytema	Nominated	
St. Louis Gateway Film Critics Association	December 18, 2022	Best Visual Effects	Guillaume Rocheron, Jeremy Robert, Sreejith Venugopalan and Scott R. Fisher	Nominated	
St. Louis Gateway Film Critics Association	December 18, 2022	Best Scene	"A tragic day on the set of Gordy's Home"	Nominated	
Toronto Film Critics Association	January 8, 2023	Best Supporting Actress	Keke Palmer	Won	
Washington D.C. Area Film Critics Association	December 12, 2022	Best Original Screenplay	Jordan Peele	Nominated	
Washington D.C. Area Film Critics Association	December 12, 2022	Best Cinematography	Hoyte van Hoytema	Nominated	

== Possible sequels ==
Perea convinced Peele and the Universal executives to change his character's fate in the film's climax from being killed primarily out of interest in a potential sequel, saying: "There's no way the story's over in my head. There's no way. For how heroic everything kind of seemed at the end, I'm like, there's no way they leave the heroes like this. This is just the start of something new." In an interview with Thrillist, Jean Jacket designer, John O. Dabiri, suggested that the creature survived its apparent death at the film's conclusion, saying, "There's a species of jellyfish that's called the immortal jellyfish [...] I'm not a movie maker, but if it was me, I would say there would be some interesting opportunity to ask whether we've seen the last of Jean Jacket." In an interview with The New York Times, Peele addressed a character that was cut from the film, listed on IMDb as "Nobody", saying "The story of that character has yet to be told, I can tell you that. Which is another frustrating way of saying, I'm glad people are paying attention. I do think they will get more answers on some of these things in the future. We're not over telling all of these stories."

In January 2023, Peele expressed interest in a Nope sequel featuring multiple members of the occulonimbus species ("Jean Jackets"), exploring "the nature of the occulonimbi", saying, "I didn't want to be sort of literal that Jean Jacket, or this occulonimbus species, is an angel, but I do think that there is something about where evolution and design collide that leaves doors open that may or may not be answered in the future."
