= Life (Exuma album) =

1973 album by Exuma

Studio album by Exuma
- Released: 1973
- Studio: Bell Sound (New York City)
- Length: 30:18
- Label: Kama Sutra
- Producer: Kenny Kerner; Richie Wise

Exuma chronology
Reincarnation (1972)	Life (1973)	Penny Sausage (1979)

Life is the sixth studio album by Bahamian folk musician Exuma, released in 1973 through Kama Sutra Records.

== Reception ==
A reviewer for Billboard wrote of the album: "For sheer drive and power one would be hard pressed to meet Exuma's equal." Lynn Van Matre of the Chicago Tribune called Life Exuma's "most 'commercial' album to date", while also noting, "It still manages to be different—a commodity in precious short supply these days."

== Track listing ==
All tracks are written by Exuma, except where noted.

Side A
No.	Title	Length
1.	"If It Feels Good, Do It" (M. Vale)	2:29
2.	"Paint It Black" (Jagger–Richards)	2:47
3.	"Love Is Strange" (Ethel Smith, Mickey Baker, Sylvia Robinson)	2:49
4.	"The Jumping Dance"	2:00
5.	"Iko Iko" (James "Sugar Boy" Crawford)	1:55
6.	"You Can't Always Get What You Want" (Jagger–Richards)	4:00
Total length:		16:00

Side B
No.	Title	Length
1.	"Night Time People"	2:51
2.	"Hayride"	2:14
3.	"Oh! Lovey"	2:12
4.	"Sodom and Gomorrah"	2:22
5.	"Kenyatta Alisha"	2:14
6.	"Viva El Matador" (Dexter)	2:25
Total length:		14:18

== Personnel ==
Adapted from the album's liner notes.

- Exuma (The Obeah Man) – lead vocals, choral vocals, "mouth mason", "throat thompson", guitar, cowbell, bugle, goat skin drums, trumpet, whistle
- Ouimungie Pappa Legra (Michael O'Neil) – C melody saxophone, tenor saxophone, conga drums, choral vocals, whistle, claves
- Kester Smith – set drums
- Kurt Nurse – steel pan, timbales
- Kenny Aaronson – electric bass
- Duke Clemons – upright bass (on "You Can't Always Get What You Want")
- Patti Bown – piano, celesta
- Jeff Smith – saxophone (on "Viva El Matador")
- Tyrone Demmons – trumpet (on "Viva El Matador")
- Bryan Maday – drums (on "If It Feels Good, Do It" and "Paint It Black")
- Steve Love – electric guitar, sitar (on "If It Feels Good, Do It" and "Paint It Black")
- Kenny Bichel – piano (on "If It Feels Good, Do It" and "Paint It Black")
- Richie Wise – tambourine (on "If It Feels Good, Do It")
- Priscilla Rollins – choral vocals (on "If It Feels Good, Do It")
