= Exuma II =

1970 album by Exuma

Studio album by Exuma
- Released: 1970
- Studio: Regent Sound, New York City
- Length: 41:37
- Label: Mercury
- Producer: Daddy Ya-Ya (Bob Wyld)

Exuma chronology
Exuma (1970)	Exuma II (1970)	Do Wah Nanny (1971)

Exuma II is the second studio album by Bahamian folk musician Exuma. It was released in 1970 on the Mercury Records label.

== Reception ==
Professional ratings
Review scores
Source	Rating
AllMusic	4/5 stars

In a retrospective review, Richie Unterberger of AllMusic wrote that Exuma II "is perhaps a little less strange and a little more sedate" than Exuma's prior album, the self-titled Exuma (also released in 1970), "but only a little." Unterberger concluded, "While it might not be quite as striking as [Exuma's] previous album, certainly anyone who likes that debut will like [Exuma II] as well (and vice versa)". Mike Jahn of The Baltimore Sun referred to the track "Damn Fool" as "outstanding".

== Track listing ==
All tracks are written by Exuma

Side one
No.	Title	Length
1.	"Damn Fool"	4:20
2.	"Baäl"	6:26
3.	"Paul Simon Nontooth"	5:14
4.	"Fire in the Hole"	6:47
Total length:		22:47

Side two
No.	Title	Length
1.	"A Place Called Earth"	6:22
2.	"We Got to Go"	2:48
3.	"African Rhythm"	4:53
4.	"Zandoo"	4:47
Total length:		18:50

== Personnel ==
Adapted from the album's liner notes.

- Exuma – lead vocals, guitar, ankle bells, "sacred foot drum", mouth harp
- Bob Wyld (credited as Daddy Ya -Ya) – bass vocals, attar bells, elephant bells, marching drum
- Peppy, the SpyBoy – "high harmony", conga, "cabassa sacred sand"
- Lord Cherry – conga, whistles, group vocal
- Yogi – group vocal, junk bells
- Princess Diana – group vocal, whistles
- Sally O'Brien – group vocal, whistles
- Lord Wellington – conga

Production

- Daddy Ya-Ya – producer
- Bob Liftin – engineer
