= Fire in the Hole (1972 roller coaster) =

Enclosed roller coaster

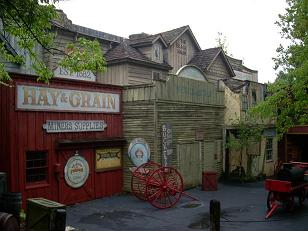

Silver Dollar City
- Location: Silver Dollar City
- Park section: Hugo's Hill Street
- Coordinates: 36.670261°N 93.340698°W
- Status: Removed
- Opening date: 1972
- Closing date: December 30, 2023

General statistics
- Type: Steel – Enclosed
- Manufacturer: Herschend Family Entertainment
- Designer: Herschend Enterprises
- Lift/launch system: Trains are powered, propelling themselves on uphill sections. Trains then freely roll over drops. Tires embedded in the track also move trains through certain sections.
- Drop: 20 ft (6.1 m)
- Length: 1,380 ft (420 m)
- Speed: 27 mph (43 km/h)
- Inversions: 0
- Duration: 3:15
- Capacity: 1000 riders per hour
- Height restriction: 36 in (91 cm)
- Trains: 5 trains with 2 cars; riders arranged 2 across in 3 rows for a total of 12 riders per train
- Must transfer from wheelchair
- Fire in the Hole at RCDB

Fire in the Hole was an enclosed roller coaster located at Silver Dollar City in Branson, Missouri. The three-story steel coaster was built in-house by Silver Dollar City in 1972. The ride was often considered a cross between a dark ride and a roller coaster. A similar ride, "Blazing Fury", was built at Herschend Family Entertainment's Silver Dollar City Tennessee, now known as Dollywood, in 1978. On February 13, 2023, Silver Dollar City announced that 2023 would be the last season for the ride before it was closed permanently. On August 14, 2023, the park announced that Fire in the Hole would be replaced by a new attraction with the same name, which opened on March 30, 2024 in the new "Fire District" section of the park.

== Theme ==
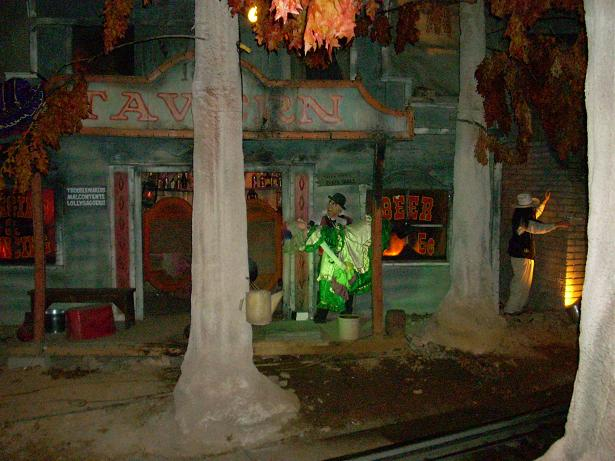
A bartender rescues a dance hall girl from the town's tavern.

This Baldknobber is blasting riders with his cannon while a coyote eerily howls close by. The Baldknobber pictured was once hanging on a rope by his neck, but has changed to its current form in recent years. The cannon came from Silver Dollar City's musical production, “For the Glory.”

Fire in the Hole was themed around the story of Marmaros, an Ozarks hill town. Marmaros was built near Marvel Cave and is the present day site of the theme park Silver Dollar City. Marmaros grew out of necessity. The miners attracted to the mining of guano from the cave along with their families began to grow in number. The investors designed a town with the intentions of becoming a resort village such as Eureka Springs, Arkansas, or Monte Ne, Arkansas. Investments became substantial and the town's population grew rapidly.

Marmaros’ existence relied heavily upon the mining operation of Marvel Cave. The town failed to attract tourists and began to slowly die out after mining ceased. Much of the town was later destroyed by fire, and what was left moved to a location south of the cave and is now submerged below Table Rock Lake.

The town was rumored to be burnt to the ground by a group of vigilantes known as the Baldknobbers. Obscure facts have turned into legend which makes deciphering the story virtually impossible. Some believe the burning of the village started out as a drunken fight in a local tavern. Others blame xenophobic outrage over William H. Lynch, a Canadian businessman who purchased Marvel Cave; Lynch would later open the cave as a tourist attraction. Evidence proves that the town did in fact burn, however the true story may never be established.

The original concept of the ride relied heavily upon Marvel Cave itself. During the planning phases of Fire in the Hole the ride was referred to as The Devil's Den. This was a name given to the cave centuries before mining operation had started. The ride was to include volcanoes and exploding geysers. However, modifications were eventually made and the ride took on its current form.

Fire in the Hole's dated production values and odd subject matter made the ride a cult favorite, with some people even developing "callback lines" to shout at various points during the ride. Riders passed scenes of the town's residents trying to extinguish the flames before crossing a collapsing bridge, nearly getting run-over by a steam train, and crashing into a dynamite storage shack. In the ride's finale the coaster trains were sent hurtling over a drop into a pool of water with a splashdown finish. The splash was part of the ride since its conception. Water cannons within the splash down lake were enhanced during the summer months to drench riders, and turned off during the cooler seasons to only mist riders.

== Scenes ==
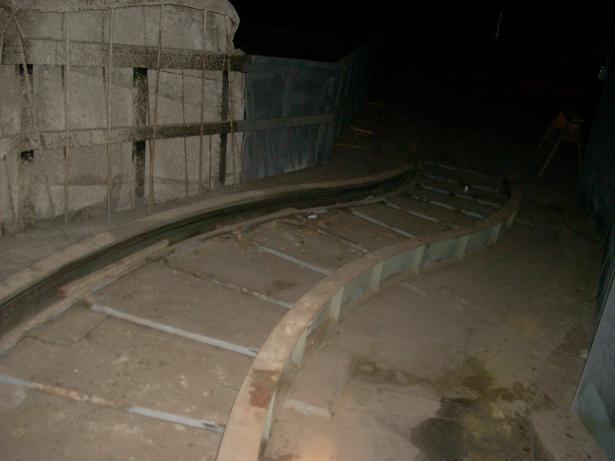
A section of a scene that has been removed. The scene gave the rider the illusion of broken tracks over a deep chasm. When it appeared to the riders that they would be in peril a sharp right turn away from the cliff was made.

Throughout the ride, there were many scenes of Marmaros engulfed in flames. The scenes included a burning hotel where a baldknobber steals a pair of trousers from a guest (named Red Flanders) trying to escape, an off-limits Baldknobber camp, a blazing cabin, a collapsing bridge, and a Main Street which included a saloon, undertaker, and blacksmith shop. A shootout takes place on Main Street between three Baldknobbers and the town sheriff. This results in the undertaker's windows being shot out and bullet holes in the water tower which would soak riders.

To increase rider capacity a large section of track was removed in 1982. After the first dip (Collapsing Bridge) the ride would turn right and later reconnect in front of the second one (Train Collision). At the scene where the cabin was burning, there was a moon and some stars above one of the old track areas. Also, at the sign for “Kinney Bridge”, to rider's left was a large open area where scenes once existed.

The removed scenes included one with a group of Baldknobbers having the following conversation: "All right boys remember, don't fire until you see the whites of their eyes." A gun fires. "Ow! You damn knocked me (or you damn knock-kneed...) Oh, excuse me kids." After that scene, the trains encountered the Baldknobber dumping the barrel on the riders (now moved to another part of the ride). This was followed by a sign reading, "Danger, Track out ahead". Coming out of the tunnel, riders saw what appeared to be the track mangled, hanging off a cliff. Just as they headed out over it, the cars cut back sharply on the real track. The track then reconnected with the existing track headed for the train hill.

This description is incomplete and based on a video that removed content that included copyrighted music. Look at soundtrack for more details on some of the exclusions.

== Soundtrack ==
A dedicated soundtrack was produced in 1972 for the original Fire in the Hole attraction. The music featured a ragtime style with prominent Southern instrumentation, including banjos, and was played both inside the ride and around the exterior queue area. Guests would hear the music along with recorded dialogue throughout the ride and on the exterior.

The ride’s soundtrack also incorporated the traditional campfire song “Mrs. O’Leary’s Cow,” widely known as “Hot Time in the Old Town Tonight,” arranged in a ragtime style. The inclusion referenced a popular camp song, in which a blaze is humorously attributed to O’Leary’s cow kicking over a lantern and that there will be a “hot time in the old town tonight, fire, fire, fire!”. In the original version of Fire in the Hole, riders passed a barn scene alluding to this folklore shortly before entering the depiction of the burning town of Marmaros. This musical and thematic element does not appear in the updated version of the attraction.

== Incidents ==
In 1972, a guest was injured while riding after falling out of a ride vehicle.

On July 9, 1980, one rider was killed and another injured when a roller coaster train was accidentally switched and redirected to a maintenance track, which had low-hanging structures in the storage area. A 23-year-old man struck his head on one of the structures, killing him. The cause of the accident was attributed to human error, and the ride reopened two days later following an investigation. The overhanging structures were later removed from the maintenance area.
