= Fire in the Hole (2024 roller coaster) =

Enclosed roller coaster

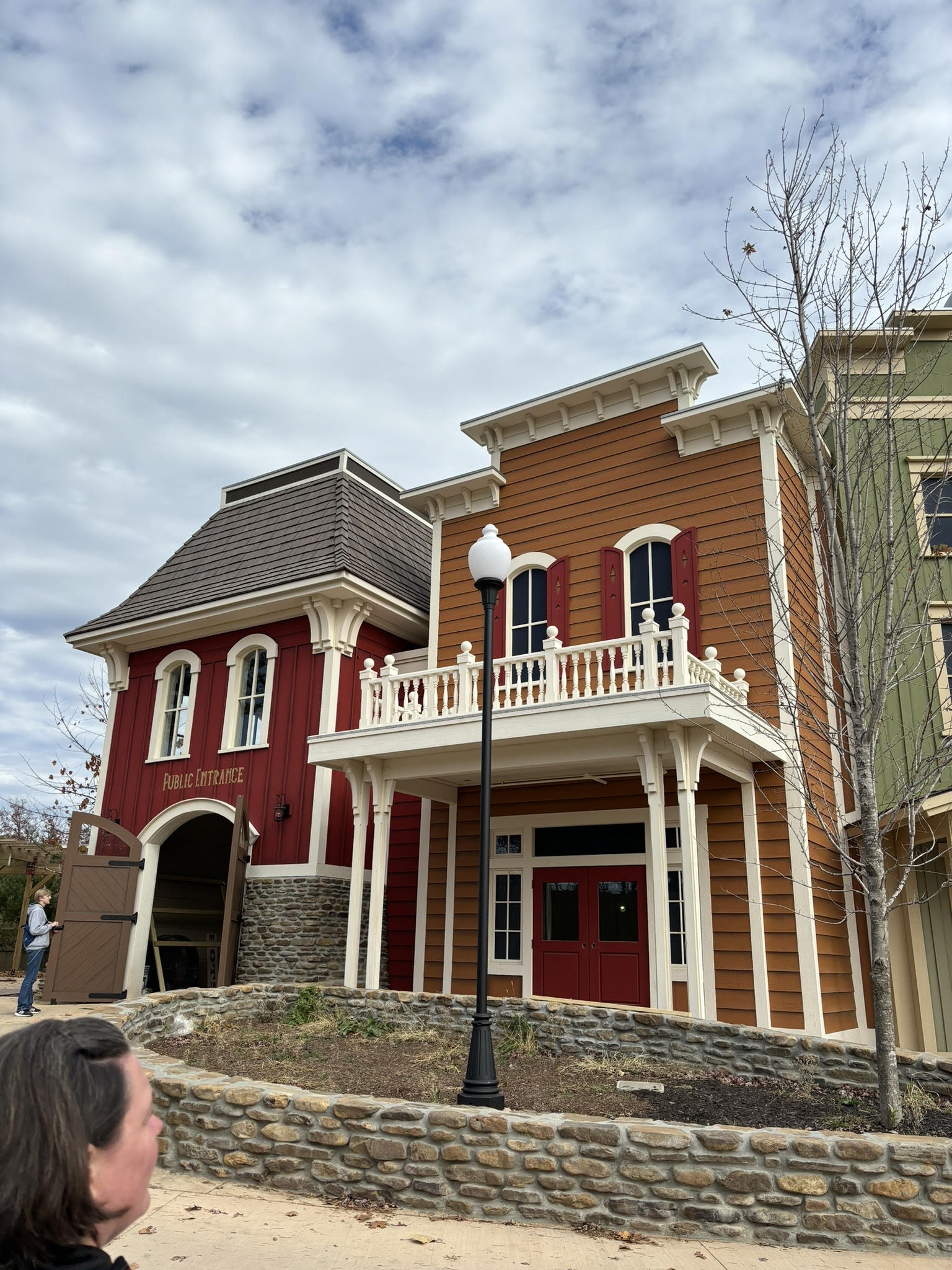
- The outside of the new 2024 Fire in the Hole

Silver Dollar City
- Location: Silver Dollar City
- Park section: Fire District
- Coordinates: 36.6716°N 93.338°W
- Status: Operating
- Soft opening date: March 9, 2024
- Opening date: March 30, 2024
- Cost: $30 Million

General statistics
- Type: Steel
- Manufacturer: Rocky Mountain Construction
- Length: 1,512 ft (461 m)
- Speed: 26 mph (42 km/h)
- Inversions: 0
- Duration: 2:51
- Trains: 5 trains with 2 cars; riders arranged 2 across in 3 rows for a total of 12 riders per train
- Fire in the Hole at RCDB

Fire in the Hole is a steel indoor roller coaster located in the Fire District section of Silver Dollar City in Branson, Missouri, United States. The five story coaster was built by Rocky Mountain Construction in collaboration with the park as a replacement of the 1972 coaster with the same name. It opened on March 30, 2024. Like its predecessor, the attraction is both a dark ride and a roller coaster, and it depicts various scenes based on the historical mining town of Marmaros. The coaster features a powered incline and gravity descent, including three drops and a splash landing. The updated coaster pays homage to the original, with its similar ride layout and storyline, but it adds updated special effects and state-of-the-art onboard audio.

== Ride experience and theme ==
Fire in the Hole is themed around the story of Marmaros, an Ozarks town. Marmaros was built next to the on site Marvel Cave, and the town is where Silver Dollar City is located today. The town gained a decent population because of the availability of guano in the Marvel Cave. The town thrived off the profitability of the cave until the town was rumored to be burnt to the ground by the vigilante group, the Baldknobbers. The true nature of this legend is unknown, with several people blaming a drunken fight and others blaming xenophobic outrage towards the purchase of Marvel Cave by William H. Lynch, a Canadian Businessman. There is evidence that the town did burn, but the true reason and story will likely never be known.

Fire in the Hole portrays this legend, much like the original 1972 attraction, although with certain key narrative differences to further immerse riders in the narrative. Riders enter the ride building under the premise that the local "Pumper Factory" is revealing all-new pumper wagons (firefighting vehicles) for the local firefighters. Upon entry, it is revealed to guests that the town has been set ablaze by the vigilante group, the Baldknobbers, and guests must board trains themed to the all new pumper wagons to help put out the fire. When the trains are dispatched, riders are sent through several show scenes depicting the chaos of the burning mining town. Riders pass through scenes depicting the citizens attempting to put out the fire while a trio of Baldknobbers named Patches, Bugs, and Wiley cause chaos. Firefighters are depicted attempting to put out the fire before the trains cross a burning bridge that appears to collapse. After this first drop, guests are almost run over by a steam train, which is the second drop of the ride. Then, just before the iconic final splashdown, the riders blast the water tower, saving the town.

== Announcement ==
On February 13, 2023, to the disappointment of many fans of the original ride, it was announced that the now defunct Fire in the Hole ride would be closing on December 30, 2023. This began speculation on what would be replacing the iconic attraction, and rumors grew with the construction of a new ride building behind what was previously known as Fireman's Landing area of the park (now known as the Fire District). On August 14, 2023, Silver Dollar City announced that a newly revitalized version of Fire in the Hole, constructed in partnership with Rocky Mountain Construction (the company's first non-thrill attraction), would open in the spring of 2024. Brad Thomas, President of the Silver Dollar City Company, proclaimed that the new ride would not only preserve the history of Silver Dollar City, but would also be the anchor attraction of the newly renamed Fire District. The ride is currently Silver Dollar City's biggest investment in a single attraction to date, costing $30 million to build. On March 1, 2024, it was announced that the ride would open on March 30, 2024.
