= Exuma (musician) =

Bahamian musical artist

- Exuma, circa 1971

Background information
- Born: Macfarlane Gregory Anthony Mackey; February 18, 1942; Tea Bay, Cat Island, The Bahamas
- Died: January 25, 1997 (aged 54) Nassau, The Bahamas
- Genres: Folk; carnival; junkanoo; calypso; reggae; African music
- Instruments: Vocals; guitar; cowbells; whistles; African drums
- Years active: 1962–1997
- Labels: Mercury; Buddah; Kama Sutra; ROIR

Macfarlane Gregory Anthony Mackey (18 February 1942 – 25 January 1997), known professionally as Tony McKay and Exuma, was a Bahamian musician, artist, playwright, and author best known for his music that blends folk, rock, carnival, junkanoo, calypso, reggae, and African music stylings.

His Exuma persona, as well as his lyrics, were influenced by the West African and Bahamian tradition of Obeah, a system of spiritual and healing practices developed among enslaved West Africans in the West Indies, practiced by many on the islands of The Bahamas. He was also a practitioner of herbal medicine. Reviewers have often identified McKay's music as containing or invoking voodoo-related imagery, and have compared his music to that of New Orleans-born musician Dr. John (and vice versa). However, McKay clarified against the association between the imagery of his music and the popular concept of voodoo as depicted in Hollywood-produced films, stressing that his music is instead based on the healing practices of Obeah: "It isn't voodoo or witchcraft [...] not in the way that the man goes home at night and makes a secret potion."

Exuma's self-titled debut album was released in 1970 through Mercury Records, and was followed by Exuma II later that same year. His next four albums, Do Wah Nanny (1971), Snake, Reincarnation (both 1972), and Life (1973), were issued by Kama Sutra Records. In 1977, he created a musical stage production titled Junkanoo Drums that incorporated a number of his songs; the success of the show led to Exuma becoming a regular performer at the New Orleans Jazz & Heritage Festival. By the 1980s, McKay had founded his own record label, Inagua Records, and moved to New Orleans. After moving to Colorado in 1994, he spent time living in Miami, Florida, and Nassau, Bahamas, and died in his sleep in the latter city in January 1997.

In a 1970 interview, McKay, as Exuma, said the "'electrical part' of his being 'came from beyond Mars; down to Earth on a lightning bolt'". He described his music as "all music that has ever been written and all music not yet written. It's feeling, emotion, the sound of man, the sound of day creatures, night creatures and electrical forces".

== Early life ==
Born in Tea Bay on Cat Island, Bahamas, McKay and his mother Daisy Mackey moved to Nassau. He grew up there in a small house on Canaan Lane, shared by Ma' Gurdie, an older woman who McKay said "danced so well". "When I sing, I can still see Ma' Gurdie's beautiful moves".

As a boy, McKay and his friends caught and sold fish to buy movie tickets. Watching the films exposed them to Sam Cooke and Fats Domino and other American blues singers, who they would imitate.

McKay moved to New York City at the age of 17 to study architecture. He "promptly ran out of money". Friends give him an old guitar and knowing three or four chords, he started practicing old Bahamian calypsos. Homesick for Nassau, McKay began writing poetry about Ma' Gurdie and Junkanoo. These poems became the basis for McKay's "Brown Girl in the Ring" (later a hit for Boney M), "Rushing Through the Crowd" and other Exuma songs. McKay did not complete his architectural studies.

== Musical career ==
=== Manhattan and Greenwich Village, and early recordings as Tony McKay (1960s) ===
Nassau friends living in Brooklyn took McKay to Greenwich Village, introducing him to hootenannies in neighborhood cafes. McKay founded the group Tony McKay and the Islanders. During this time, McKay also performed at Cafe Wha? and The Bitter End.

McKay often performed with well known musicians and comedians in small Greenwich Village clubs and bars. "I started playing around when Bob Dylan, Richie Havens, Peter, Paul and Mary, Richard Pryor, (Jimi) Hendrix and (Barbra) Streisand were all down there, too, hanging out and performing at the Cafe Bizarre".

Beginning in 1963, recorded a number of 7" singles. He released the following as "Tony McKay":

- "Ten Past Twelve Cinderella Blues" / "Riddle Rhyme Song" (7", Single, Promo) Claridge Records CR-318 1963
- "Nobody's Perfect" / "Detroit" (7", Single, Promo) Claridge Records CR-307-N 1965
- "Island Hog" / "The Ticking Of The Clock" (7", Single, Promo) Josie Records 45-979 1967
- "The Island Hog" (Stereo) / "The Island Hog" (Mono) (7", Single, Promo) Brunswick 55407 (unknown release date)

In 1969, Palisades Amusement Park advertised McKay as a featured artist during that year's season opening weekend. He appeared on a bill that included Peaches & Herb.

=== Founding Exuma (1969) ===
In 1969 McKay launched the group "Exuma" (named after a group of Bahamian islands) with his then-partner and lifelong friend Sally O'Brien. He enlisted several musician friends, forming his backup band, the Junk Band. The band included O'Brien (as Sister Sally), Bogie, Lord Wellington, Villy, Spy Boy Thielheim, Mildred Vaney, Frankie Gearing, Diana Claudia Bunea (as Princess Diana), and his good friend Peppy Castro (Emil Thielhelm, lead singer of the Blues Magoos).

He soon gained the attention of Blues Magoos manager Bob Wyld. "I'd been singing down there (Greenwich Village), and we'd all been exchanging ideas and stuff. Then one time a producer (Wyld) came up to me and said he was very interested in recording some of my original songs, but he said that I needed a vehicle." Wyld recommended McKay to Mercury Records and convinced the record label to sign him.

=== Exuma and Exuma II (1970) ===
In 1970 McKay, recording as "Exuma" and accompanied by a band with the same name, released two albums. Both featured full cover artwork painted by McKay.

Mercury Records released McKay's first album Exuma, produced by "Daddy Ya Ya", a pseudonym adopted by Bob Wyld. Wyld produced the first six of Exuma's albums. Singles released from that LP were "Exuma, The Obeah Man" and "Junkanoo".

Describing his process of musical creativity, McKay said "I try to be a story-teller, a musical doctor, one who brings musical vibrations from the universal spiritual plane through my guitar strings and my voice. I want to bring some good energy to the people. My whole first album came to me in a dream".

Mercury Records launched "a full-scale promotion and advertising campaign". Lou Simon, then Mercury Records' Senior VP for Sales, Marketing and Promotion said "the reaction is that of a heavy, big numbers contemporary album... as a result, we're going to give it all the merchandising support we can muster". McKay's second album Exuma II had two singles released, "Damn Fool" and "Zandoo".

McKay also garnered recognition for his song "You Don't Know What's Going On", which was featured on the soundtrack of John G. Avildsen's 1970 film Joe.

The Barclay record label distributed Exuma's Mercury Records releases in France, Holland, Switzerland and Belgium.

The second album, Exuma II, featured performers were: Tony 'Exuma' McKay – lead vocals, guitar, ankle bell, & Sacred foot drum; Daddy Ya Ya – backing vocals, bass, attar & elephant bells, & marching drums; Yogi - backing vocals & junk bells; Spy Boy Thielheim – high harmony congas, cabassa, & Sacred sand; Lord Cherry - congas & whistle; Lord Wellington – congas; & Princess Diana & Sister Sally O'Brien (bass drum)– backing vocals & whistles.

McKay painted, using chalk pastels, oil paints and water colors, during his music career. He created the cover artwork for many of his albums, beginning with the first in 1970. Musicologist Julian Cope said McKay's album covers were "adorned with Exuma's own fantastic paintings... transforming human faces into their respective animal spirits".

=== Do Wah Nanny, Snake, Reincarnation, and Life (1971–1973) ===
McKay left Mercury Records in 1971 to sign with Buddha Records' subsidiary Kama Sutra record label, through which he released the albums Do Wah Nanny (1971), Snake (1972), Reincarnation (1972), and Life (1973).

In 1971, McKay obtained a copyright for Godevan – A Play in Three Acts. The filing listed McKay as the author and staging by Exuma band member Sally O'Brien.

=== Founding Inagua Records, and Junkanoo Drums stage production (1975–1977) ===
Seeking greater artistic freedom, McKay's recordings were not released on a major record label for the rest of his career. By 1975 he had founded Inagua Records, his own record label through which he would self-release a number of records.

In 1977, McKay created Junkanoo Drums, a musical stage production that showcased a dozen of his songs. McKay used the production to weave a story told by a "Grand Deacon". In August and September 1977 Exuma performed Junkanoo Drums multiple times during that year's free Lincoln Center "Out-Of-Doors" concert series at the band shell in Damrosch Park. At each show's conclusion McKay would lead the entire company in a carnival procession around the audience in the park.

The New York Times critic Robert Palmer said that the show "has no plot or overall theme", but instead "consists of a series of original songs by the Bahamian singer, songwriter and guitarist Exuma, but the songs have been elaborated into theatrical sketches, with 40 dancers, singers and musicians participating."

=== New Orleans Jazz & Heritage Festival (1978–1991) ===
Hearing of McKay's success performing Junkanoo Drums, New Orleans Jazz & Heritage Festival producer Quint Davis tracked him down by calling the Bahamian Embassy. Davis invited McKay to perform at the 1978 Festival. McKay performed at the New Orleans Jazz Festival from 1978 until 1991. The 1983 Festival program described McKay as "Exuma - the Obeah man whose Caribbean music is similar in spirit to the street music of New Orleans".

=== Penny Sausage, Street Music, Universal, and Rude Boy (1979–1986) ===
In 1979, Exuma released Penny Sausage through his Inagua Records label. This was followed by Street Music, issued through Nassau Records.

By the 1980s McKay had moved to New Orleans and was a regular at the New Orleans Jazz & Heritage Festival. He also performed regularly at the Old Absinthe House, a popular venue on Bourbon Street in the French Quarter. These nights often became jam sessions, as McKay would play songs that were not in the set list, attracting accomplished musicians, such as Bill Wyman and members of Bob Dylan's band.

McKay said of New Orleans: "I found New Orleans to be a very cultural place where if you bring love to the people, they will give you the necessary energy to bring even more."

In 1982 Exuma released Universal through Cat Island Records. In 1986, Street Music was reissued as Rude Boy on the ROIR label.

=== Move to Colorado, and the Smithsonian's Festival of American Folklife (1994) ===
In 1994 McKay lived in Colorado, saying he found himself inspired by the area's "peacefulness". "It comes from the love of what I am doing. Music is like eating and breathing—every fiber of me is in music. I've always been like that. The music energizes me and keeps me alive, I think. I have a lot I want to say in a positive way. I don't want to say anything negative. I try to go through every word and make sure that there is nothing negative gender-wise or any-kind-wise. If I have done anything in the past that is not that way, well, I beg forgiveness for that. But I try to move on a positive note." McKay said he had recorded 30 new songs during 1994 with New Orleanian Charles Hancock and fellow Bahamian Rudy Green. At the time he was "presently in the process of deciding which will make the final cut".

McKay was invited to participate in the Smithsonian Institution's 1994 Festival of American Folklife, an annual event presented on the Mall in Washington, D.C. At the event, he styled himself "Macfarlane 'Tony' Mackey, 'Exuma the Obeah Man'". McKay recorded a number of songs at the Festival, performing with many other Bahamian artists, including Thomas Cartwright and the Boys, the Dicey Doh Singers, Nathaniel "Piccolo Pete" Saunders and Cebric "Seabreeze" Bethel.

== Artistry ==
=== Exuma, the Obeah Man persona ===
Creating an image and a persona that fit his music, McKay drew upon his Bahamian memories of the "Obeah Man". Bahamian life was rooted in West African tradition.

McKay was a knowledgeable practitioner of bush medicine. He specialized in herbal remedies, especially the "mystical cerasee vine" (Bitter leaves or Momordica charantia), which he collected in Nassau. "I grew up as a roots person, someone knowing about the bush and the herbs and the spiritual realm. It was inbred into all of us. Just like for people growing up in the lowlands of the Delta Country or places in Africa."

"I remembered the Obeah Man from my childhood—he's the one with the colorful robes who would deal with the elements and the moonrise, the clouds and the vibrations of the earth. So I decided to call myself 'Exuma, the Obeah Man'".

McKay further explained his interpretation of Obeah. "Obeah was with my grandfather, with my grandmother, with my father, with my mother, with my uncles who taught me. It has been my religion in the vein that everyone has grown up with some sort of religion, a cult that was taught. Christianity is like good and evil. God is both. He unlocked the secrets to Moses, good and evil, so Moses could help the children of Israel. It's the same thing, the whole completeness—the Obeah Man, the spirits of air."

=== Musical collaborations ===
Over the years the group Exuma played or toured with Patti LaBelle, Curtis Mayfield, Rita Marley, Peter Tosh, Toots & the Maytals, Sly and the Family Stone, Steppenwolf, Black Flag and the Neville Brothers.

Musicians who have performed on his recordings and in his stage shows include Aziza Bey, Patti Bown, David Bromberg, George J. 'Duke' Clemmons, Jerry Congales, Chuchlow Eliebank, Alfred "Pee Wee" Ellis, Alan Glover (Akinjorin "Juice" Omolade), Earl Gordon, Bill "Hutch" Hutchinson, Carl Jennings, Dave Libert, Bruce "Weasel" McDonald, George Porter Jr, Alfred "Uganda" Roberts, Ricky Sebastian, Kester Smith, Babatunde Olatunji, Michael O'Neil (as Ouimungie Pappa Legba), Bernard Purdie, John Russo, Victor Sirker, Michael Sklar, Dennis Taylor, David Torkanowsky, Earl Turbinton, David Lee Watson, Jacob Watson, Stanley Wiley (Kasa Allah) and Al Zanzler.

== Community and charitable efforts ==
McKay and Exuma were a continual presence in charitable efforts across America, performing concerts and sharing receipts with various organizations.

In December 1972, Exuma performed a free concert to support the Black Expo held at the Americana Hotel in Manhattan as well as a concert at Columbia Artists Management Inc. (CAMI) Hall to benefit East, a music club in Bedford-Stuyvesant.

== Personal life ==
=== Marriage and family ===
In 1974 McKay married Inita Watkins in Manhattan.

McKay fathered many children, including Shaw, Gavin, Kenyatta Alisha, and Acklins. Acklins and Kenyatta Alisha are vocal artists, carrying on their father's tradition of entertainment.

=== Murder of wife and son ===
McKay's estranged wife Marilyn "Sammy" Mackey (née Guse) and their first son Shaw were murdered by Fritz Montalalou on May 10, 1972, at 217 Avenue A in Manhattan. Married in 1962 and separated from McKay for a year, 32-year-old Mackey suffered a slashed throat and a chest wound. Their nine-year-old son was stabbed once and later died in Bellevue Hospital. Their eight-year-old son Gavin, who had been sleeping in another room, called the police after the murders. Montalalou was convicted on two counts of murder and sentenced to two consecutive life terms. During the trial, Montalalou was said to have "kicked in the apartment door" and killed the two in revenge for Mackey having called the police after Montalalou had assaulted his ex-girlfriend who lived across the hall from Mackey.

== Later life and death ==
In the late 1980s, McKay suffered a heart attack in New Orleans. Bahamas Tourism Officer Athama Bowe recalls visiting McKay in hospital. "His skin was coated with olive oil and candles were burning all over the room for 'the sperrits'. He was mixing modern medicine with Obeah."

McKay spent most of his time writing songs, painting, and fishing, living in both Miami, Florida, and in the childhood home his mother had left him in Nassau. McKay died in his sleep in 1997.

== Legacy ==
=== Influence on other artists ===
Aspects of McKay's "Obeah Man" persona influenced other artists, notably singer Nina Simone. Converting McKay's "Obeah Man" into "Obeah Woman", Simone assumed the role of "priestess" in her cover. Her live performance was recorded on her album "It Is Finished". The song begins with drumming by Babatunde Olatunji and Simone asking "do you know what an "Obeah Woman" is?" She continues, altering McKay's lyrics: "I'm the Obeah woman, from beneath the sea / To get to Satan, you gotta pass through me"... "they call me Nina, and Pisces too / There ain't nothin' that I can't do". Simone also performed two additional McKay songs during the live recording, "Dambala" and "22nd Century".

=== Critical analysis ===
Former Parliamentarian, Cabinet Minister, Chairman of the College Council of the College of The Bahamas and fellow Bahamian Alfred M. Sears said McKay as Exuma was "A Bahamian visionary, humanistic philosopher and people's poet. Exuma gives expression to the beauty and power of the cultural life of the Bahamas—the people's every day experiences, folklore, myths, stories, junkanoo, rake and scrape, pain, joy, struggle and survival. His life and art reflect the wonderful cultural heritage and personality of Bahamians, drawing on the roots of Africa and the branches of the Amerindians, Europeans and Americans."

Bahamian musicologist Roney Ambrister, BEM said of McKay "You could put him in line with (Joseph) Spence. He was a jubil fellow, very happy, he would grab his guitar, kick off, and the rest of the band would follow him". Ambrister said while "there was no such thing as 'Obeah music'", the spiritual charge lay instead in McKay's fantastic clothing, artwork, and mystical lyrics, as in, "His time is short, his time is long, Exuma ain't right and Exuma ain't wrong."

=== Posthumous exhibitions ===
In August 2010 a multi-media exhibition of McKay's art, memorabilia and music was held at the Doongalik Studios Art Gallery in Nassau City, New Providence, Bahamas. Artist Joseph Spence was showcased in the exhibit as well.

McKay's art is still offered in art galleries in the US and the Bahamas.

== Awards and honors ==
In 1974 McKay was invited by the Queen Julianna of the Netherlands to perform for her along with the Edwin Hawkins Singers.

In June 1988 McKay was awarded the British Empire Medal (BEM) by Queen Elizabeth II "for services to music and his contributions to Bahamian culture".

Solomon, an oil on canvas portrait of McKay by Stanley Burnside is in the permanent collection of the National Art Gallery of The Bahamas. The museum describes the painting as "a bold commemorative piece of art that recognizes Mackey's memory and status as a leader at what he did... The viewer shouldn't ignore the crown that sits snugly over Mackey's locks, this is Burnside's assertion of Mackey's wisdom and kingly status in Bahamian history."

== Discography ==
- Exuma (1970)
- Exuma II (1970)
- Do Wah Nanny (1971)
- Snake (1972)
- Reincarnation (1972)
- Life (1973)
- From Africa To America To Junkanoo To Armageddon (1976)
- Penny Sausage (1979)
- Street Music (1979) (Later reissued in 1989 as "Rude Boy")
- Universal (1982)
