= Foot drum =

Group of percussion instruments

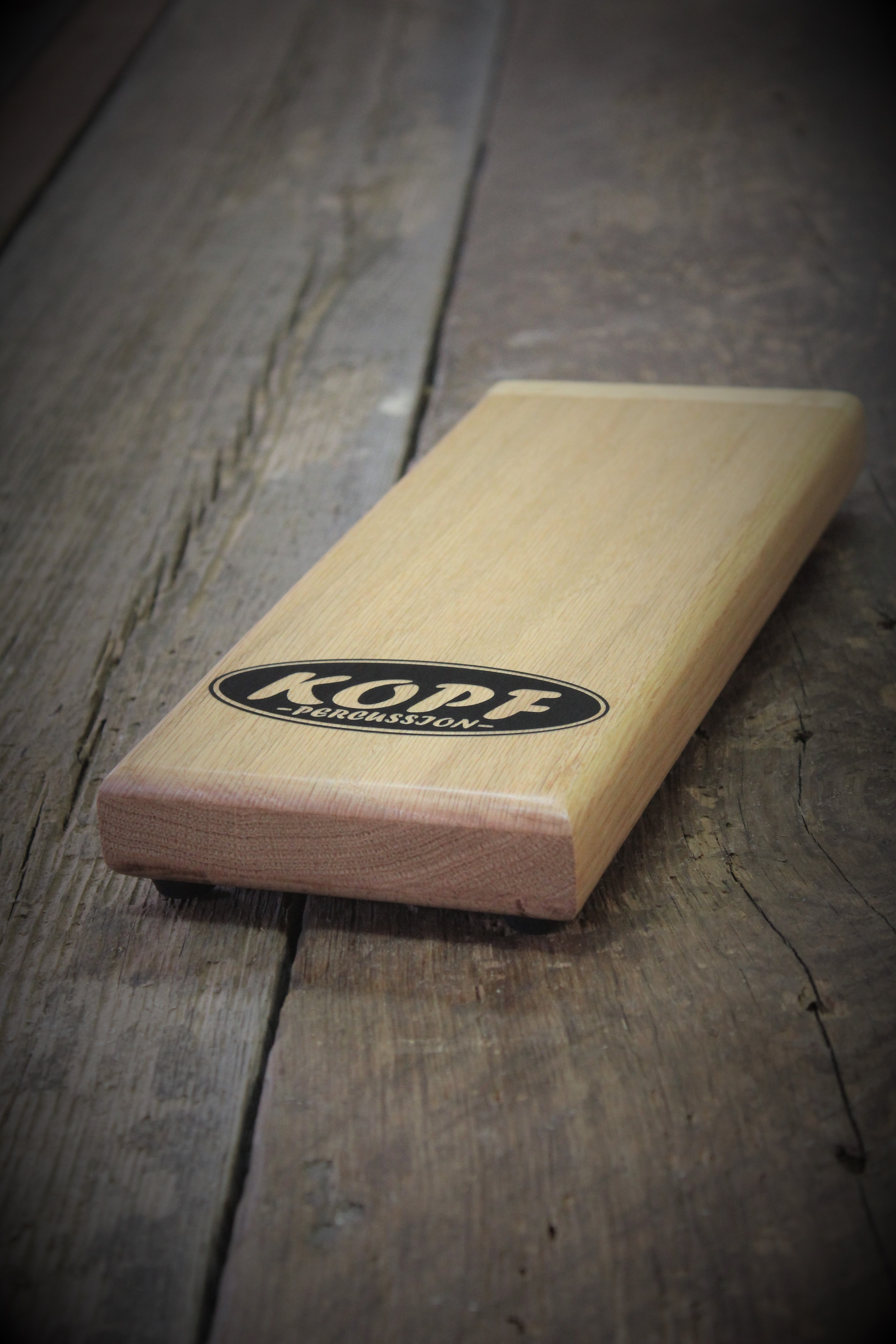
Acoustic Stompbox Foot Drum

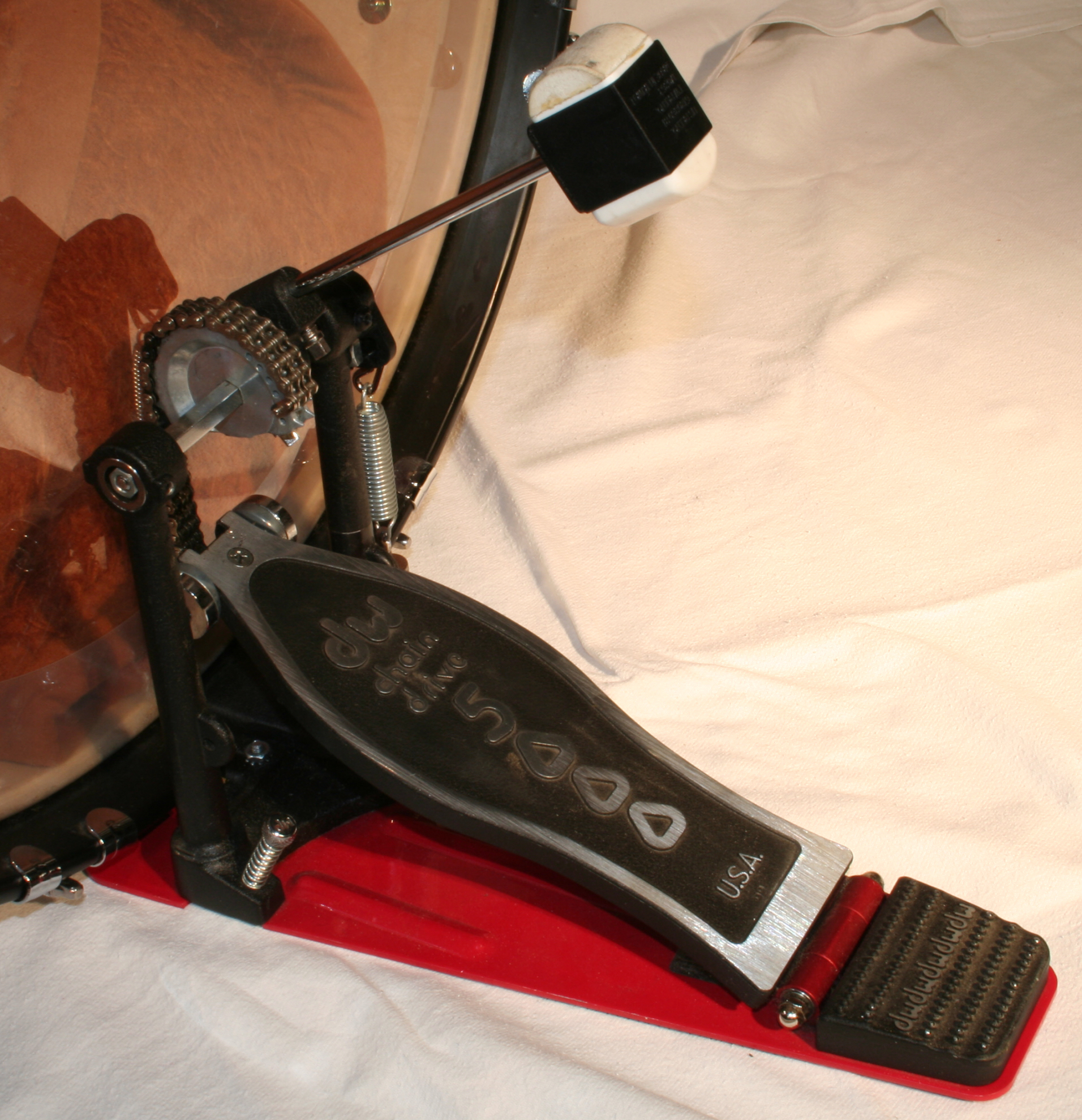
Foot drum: bass drum played with a pedal

A foot drum is any type of drum that is typically played by striking it with the bare foot or pedal and beater combination. The most common type of foot drum is the kick drum or bass drum of a drum set or trap kit, which consists of a deep cylindrical shell with drumheads attached to both ends.

== History ==
Since the 1930s, many Chicago area musicians, producers, and engineers have referred to the bass drum as the "foot drum" or "foot." It is different from the term footed drum. Although not commonly used today, the "foot drum" term is still used in areas of the music recording industry.

Although foot drums are a major component of typical drum kits in the 2010s, in the past, foot drums were often played with pedals singularly or in combination with other foot-played percussion instruments manufactured in the early-20th century by Sonor, Max Flemming, Duplex and Viktoria companies. Besides the typical bass drum and pedal, there are other varieties and playing styles of foot drums. They range from complete foot pedal-played drum kits like the Farmer FootDrum, which enable a one man band, such as a singer-guitarist, to accompany himself on drumkit, to a heel struck Cajon or a small stompbox.
