= Miner's Mountain Express =

Steel roller coaster

Silver Dollar City
- Location: Silver Dollar City
- Park section: Daredevil Pass
- Status: Under construction

General statistics
- Type: Steel
- Manufacturer: Mack Rides
- Model: Mine Train
- Lift/launch system: 2 chain lift hills
- Height: 97 ft (30 m)
- Length: 3,553 ft (1,083 m)
- Inversions: 0
- Duration: 3:18
- Height restriction: 39 in (99 cm)
- Trains: 6 cars; riders arranged 2 across in 2 rows for a total of 24 riders per train
- Airtime moments: 15
- Miner's Mountain Express at RCDB

Miner's Mountain Express is an upcoming mine train roller coaster at Silver Dollar City in Branson, Missouri, United States. Manufactured by Mack Rides, it is described as a "custom collaboration" between the park and manufacturer. The coaster was announced on August 14, 2026, as part of a $150 million USD investment in the park. Miner's Mountain Express will be the longest family coaster in the Midwestern United States when it is slated to open in the spring of 2027. The ride will be 3,553 feet (1,083 m) in length, have a maximum height of 97 feet (30 m), and feature 15 airtime moments, the most of any roller coaster in Silver Dollar City.

== History ==
Miner's Mountain Express was initially announced in a press release by Silver Dollar City on August 14, 2026, billing it as "America's Most Legendary Family Coaster". The coaster is part of a larger $150 million USD investment in the park, an investment which also includes a new resort, Silver Dollar City Resort. It will be located in Daredevil Pass, a newly designated area of the park that will also include Wildfire, Powder Keg: A Blast into the Wilderness, and the American Plunge. The ride will replace Thunderation, another mine train coaster set to close in January 2027.

== Ride experience ==
The coaster will be 3,553 feet (1,083 m) in length and feature two lift hills, the first one 97 feet (30 m) in height and the second one 69.5 feet (21.2 m) tall. The ride's duration will be 3 minutes and 18 seconds. The layout includes 15 airtime moments, the most of any coaster at Silver Dollar City.
