= Giant swing =

Giant swing may refer to:

- Giant Swing, a historic structure and landmark in Bangkok, Thailand
- Giant swing (wrestling), a professional wrestling throw
- Very large examples of a swing (seat), a suspended seat or platform that can be swung back and forth for enjoyment, including amusement rides such as:
  - Swing ride, a large carousel with suspended seats
  - Pendulum ride, a type of ride based on the motion of a fixed pendulum

== See also ==
- Screamin' Swing, a pendulum ride manufactured by S&S – Sansei Technologies
- Giant Barn Swing, a Screaming' Swing ride at the Silver Dollar City theme park in Stone County, Missouri, the United States
