= American Plunge =

Ride at Silver Dollar City

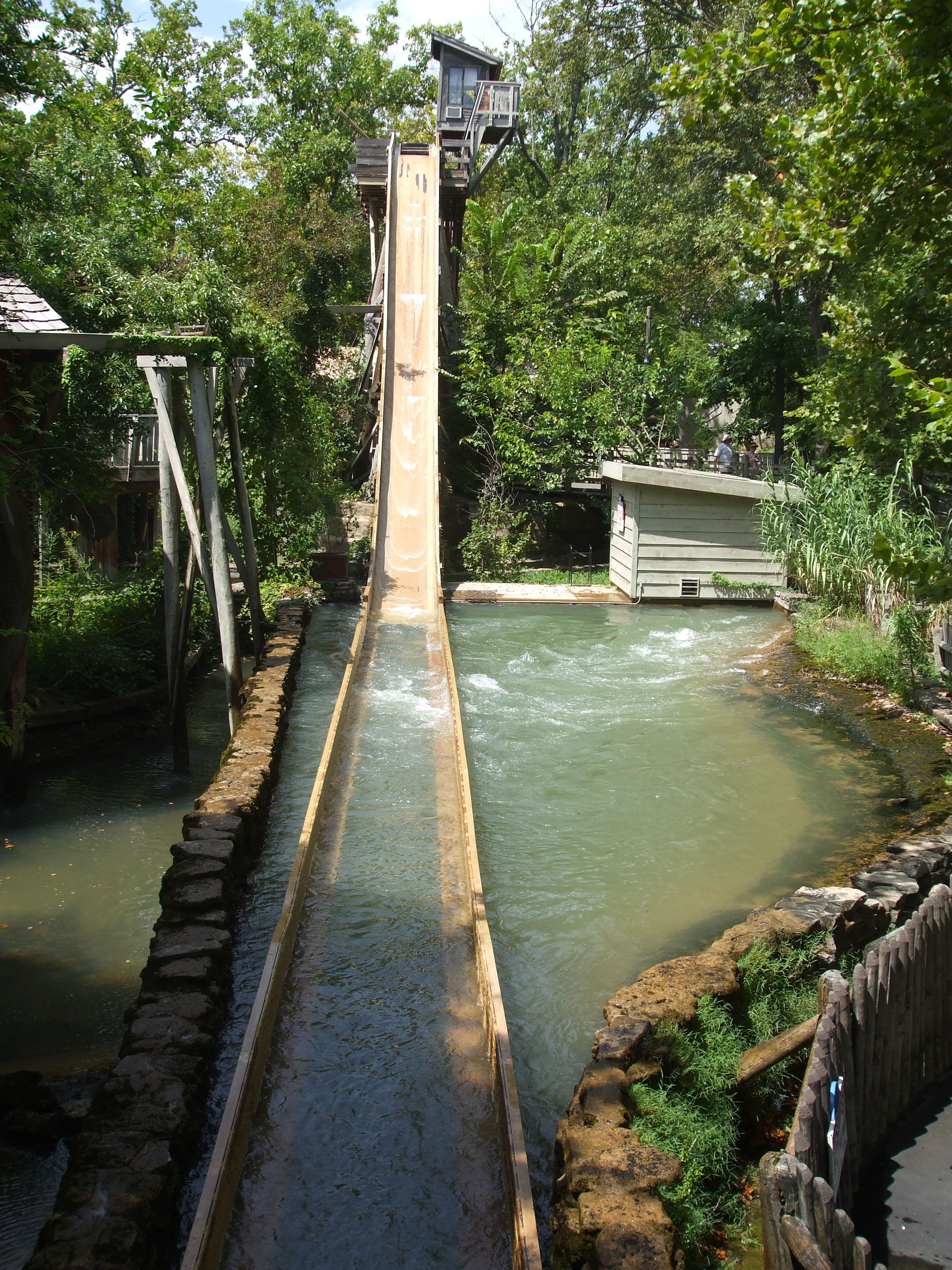
- American Plunge's drop

Silver Dollar City
- Status: Operating
- Opening date: 1981

General statistics
- Type: Log flume
- Manufacturer: Barr Engineering
- Drop: 50 ft (15 m)
- Length: 1,200 ft (370 m)
- Speed: 35 mph (56 km/h)
- Capacity: 800 riders per hour
- Duration: 4:50
- Height restriction: 36 in (91 cm)

American Plunge is a log flume water ride at Silver Dollar City in Branson, Missouri. The queueing line of this ride is parallel to the path to Silver Dollar City's steel looping coaster, Wildfire.

== History ==
The American Plunge notably replaced Jim Owens Float Trip (1969 to 1980), a boat ride around a man-made river with animatronics. The float trip included a tumbling outhouse, whirlpools and a dark cave. Some sections of the original ride's man-made river were reused for the log flume and troughs from the float trip and Silver Dollar City left the rest for scenery. A large portion of the ride's channel are no longer used, however they still exist and are used as theme in Wildfire's overflow queue-line.

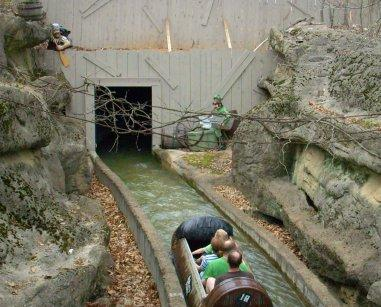
After the boat leaves the station it approaches an ominous looking tunnel.

== Theme ==
The American Plunge's theme is centered on Ozark daredevilry. The trip is a race to the plunge. Along the way you encounter others trying to beat you to the summit. Your opponents are facing obstacles of their own, tumbling off cliffs, broken boat and a whirlpool. You yourself become the hero by defying the plunge and turn into a legend. The American Plunge's boats are themed as tonic barrels and can carry a total of six passengers.

== Rider experience ==
Four to six riders enter the tonic shaped flumes. You first travel through a long dark tunnel. At the end of the tunnel water sprayers threaten to get riders wet but are timed to shut off right before you go through them. After coming out of the tunnel you go by different scenes, including a man that appears to be drowning. After all of the scenes, you go through a second tunnel, up a lift-hill, and down a steep drop into water. Then you slowly float around the exit path back into the station.
