= Outlaw Run =

Roller coaster at Silver Dollar City

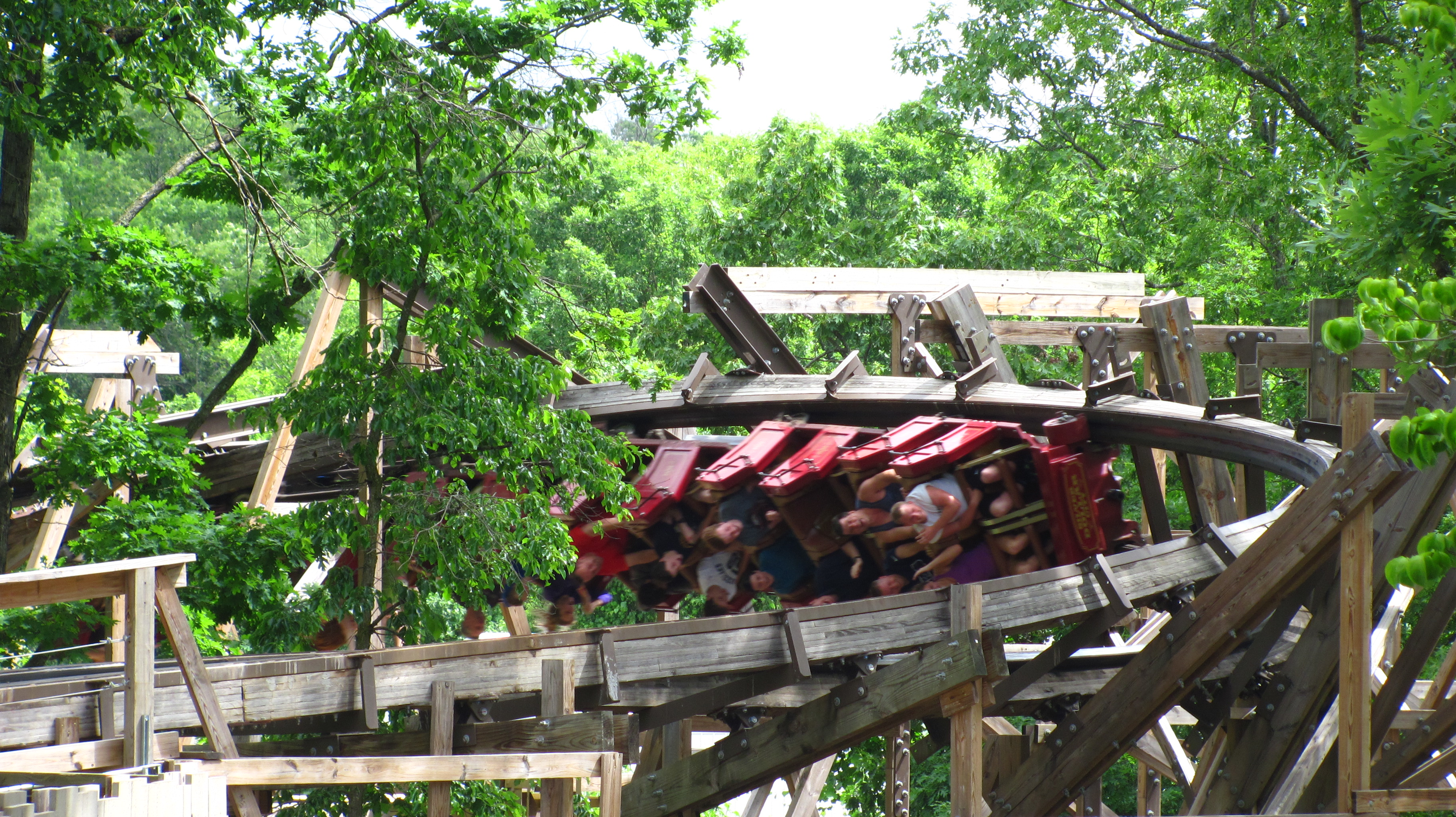

Silver Dollar City
- Location: Silver Dollar City
- Park section: Wilson's Farm
- Coordinates: 36°40′05″N 93°20′24″W
- Status: Operating
- Soft opening date: March 13, 2013
- Opening date: March 15, 2013 (13 years ago)
- Cost: US$10 million ($13.8 million in 2025 dollars)

General statistics
- Type: Wood
- Manufacturer: Rocky Mountain Construction
- Designer: Alan Schilke
- Model: Topper Track – Custom
- Track layout: Terrain
- Lift/launch system: Chain lift hill
- Height: 107 ft (33 m)
- Drop: 162 ft (49 m)
- Length: 2,937 ft (895 m)
- Speed: 68 mph (109 km/h)
- Inversions: 3
- Duration: 1:27
- Max vertical angle: 81°
- Height restriction: 48 in (122 cm)
- Trains: 2 trains with 6 cars; riders arranged 2 across in 2 rows for a total of 24 riders per train
- Must transfer from wheelchair
- Outlaw Run at RCDB

Outlaw Run is a wooden roller coaster located at Silver Dollar City in Branson, Missouri. Designed by Alan Schilke, Outlaw Run is the first wooden roller coaster manufactured by Rocky Mountain Construction (RMC) and became the first wooden coaster with multiple inversions. It features a 162-foot (49 m) drop, three inversions, and a maximum speed of 68 mph (109 km/h), making Outlaw Run the sixth-fastest wooden coaster in the world. Its 81-degree first drop is also both the fourth steepest and fourth tallest in the world among wooden roller coasters. It is tied with Wildfire at Kolmården Wildlife Park, also manufactured by RMC, for the most inversions on a wooden coaster.

Development of an early concept began in 2009, and Outlaw Run was officially announced in August 2012. Rocky Mountain Construction was selected as the manufacturer after their proposal met Silver Dollar City's concerns over available space and budget restraints. Outlaw Run opened to a positive reception on March 15, 2013.

== History ==
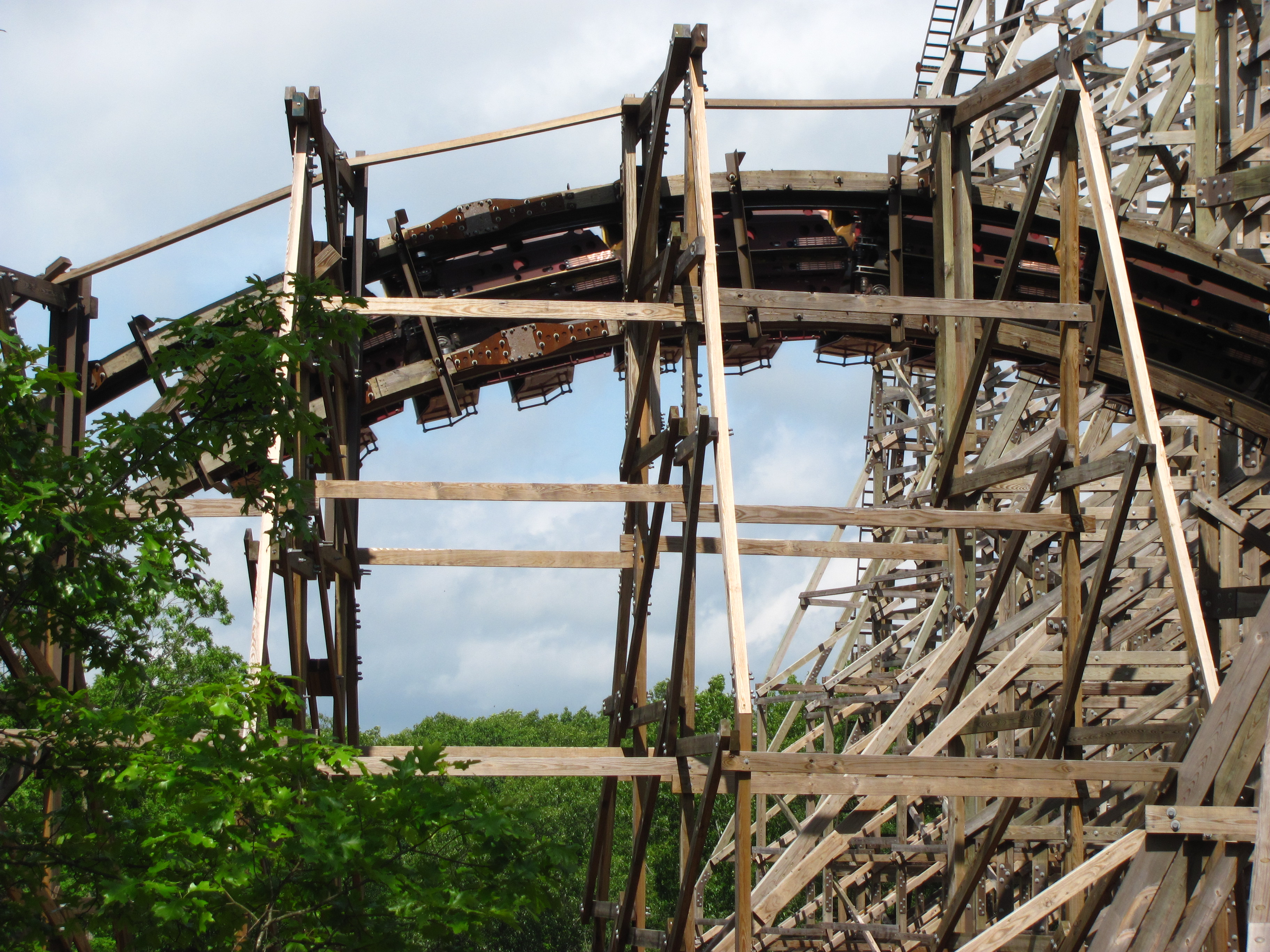
A train going through a banked turn

Planning for a new 2013 attraction in the Silver Dollar City amusement park began in 2009 with the owners, Herschend Family Entertainment, approaching Rocky Mountain Construction and other manufacturers for ideas for "a ride with marketing appeal". Joel Manby, CEO of Herschend, wanted a "world first", to have a wooden roller coaster that would be "the first to do a double barrel roll", which is when the train goes twice through a combination of a loop and a roll. In 2011, Rocky Mountain Construction showcased their new steel roller coaster, New Texas Giant, to park executives. This demonstration secured the contract.

Marketing began in 2011 when the public were made aware at the 2011 trade show of the International Association of Amusement Parks and Attractions that Rocky Mountain were working on a wooden roller coaster; it being later revealed that this roller coaster would be built at Silver Dollar City. Following the beginning of construction at the park, Silver Dollar City launched a teaser website for a new attraction to open in 2013. The website featured a public notice indicating that the ride's theme would be stagecoaches and the wild west. The teaser website also stated that an announcement would be made on August 9, 2012. As part of its teaser campaign leading to the announcement, the park released two clues; the first clue was a handwritten letter, while the second was a photo of the park's Powder Keg: A Blast into the Wilderness attraction and the nearby Table Rock Lake. On August 9, 2012, Silver Dollar City officially announced that Outlaw Run would open in the second quarter of 2013. At its opening, the ride would be the only wooden roller coaster to feature inversions and would feature the steepest drop on a wooden roller coaster. At a cost of $10 million, the ride would be the most expensive Silver Dollar City attraction in more than a decade.

On September 26, 2012, the last piece of track was installed on Outlaw Run. The ride opened to a limited audience on March 13, 2013, with a public opening two days later. Official opening celebrations were held in April.

== Characteristics ==
Outlaw Run was Rocky Mountain Construction's first wooden roller coaster. It is the sixth fastest wooden roller coaster in the world, reaching speeds of up to 68 miles per hour (109 km/h). Throughout the course of the 2,937-foot-long (895 m) ride, riders go through three inversions, including a double heartline roll. The park's existing terrain (the park is located in the Ozark Mountains) is used to allow a 107-foot-tall (33 m) lift hill to be translated into a first drop stretching 162 feet (49 m).

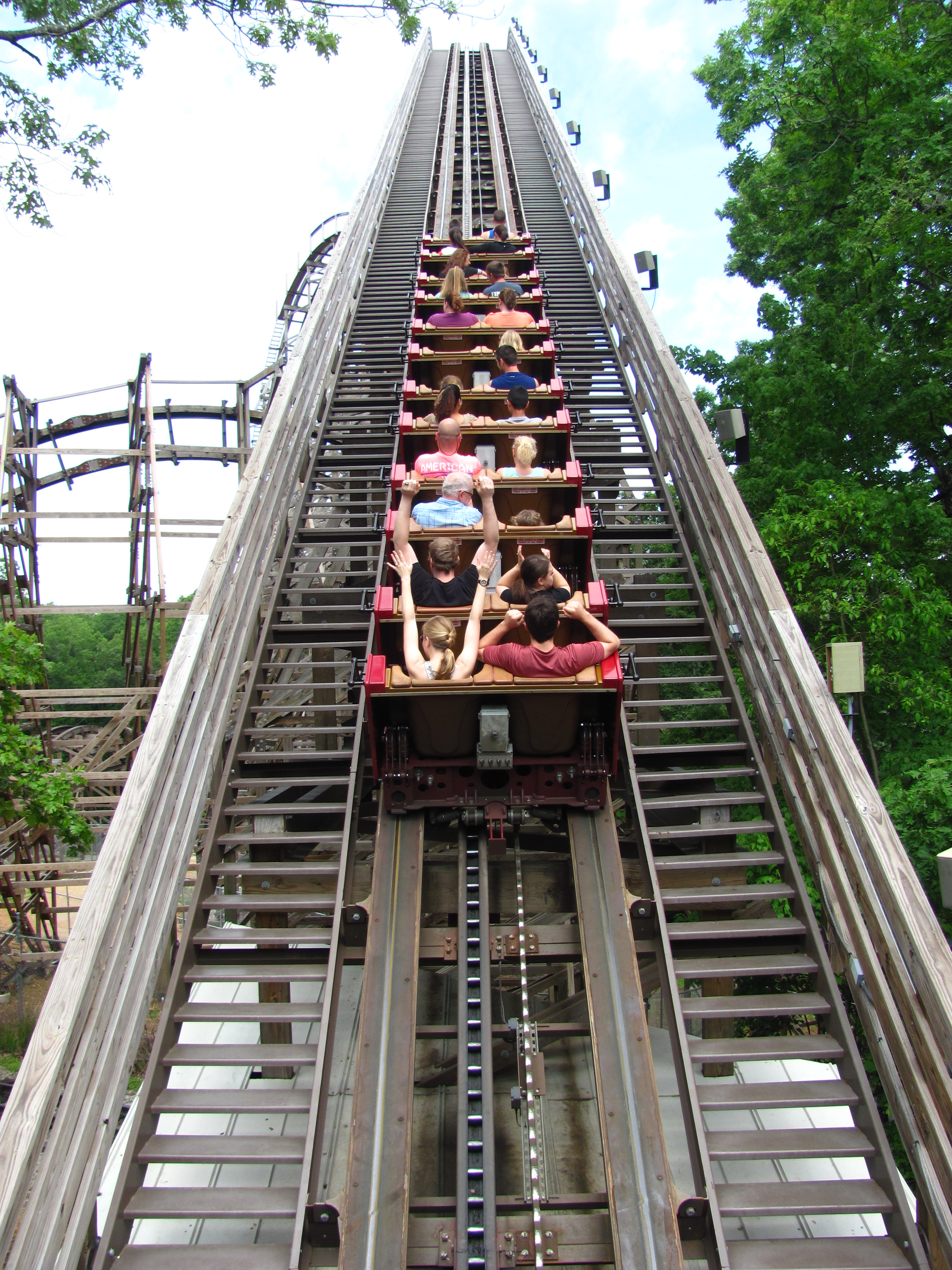
Lift hill

The 2,937 feet (895 m) of track is made primarily of layers of laminated wood, with a steel plate located in the upper layers of the track. The steel plating is known as Topper Track and is found on many roller coasters that Rocky Mountain Construction has renovated. This track style is designed to reduce the maintenance typically required for a wooden roller coaster and to provide a smoother ride experience. Rocky Mountain Construction spent four years developing technology to allow them to twist beams of wood that make up the lower layers of the track. This track configuration allows for more dynamic roller coaster elements to be performed on a wooden roller coaster.

Outlaw Run consists of two trains, each featuring twelve pairs of riders. Riders, who must be 48 inches (122 cm) or taller to ride, are restrained in their individual fiberglass seats with a U-shaped lap bar. Unlike most roller coaster trains, which have polyurethane wheels, Outlaw Run features steel wheels.

Outlaw Run features a Western stagecoach theme. The ride's station is themed as a stagecoach depot located in the outskirts of Silver Dollar City. According to the ride's storyline, stagecoaches depart daily heading west, where they are intercepted by outlaws who want to steal from them. Outlaw Run riders are the passengers on the stagecoaches the outlaws are trying to rob. To keep their family-friendly image, Silver Dollar City uses a variety of theming to advertise that "The good guys always win"

== Ride experience ==
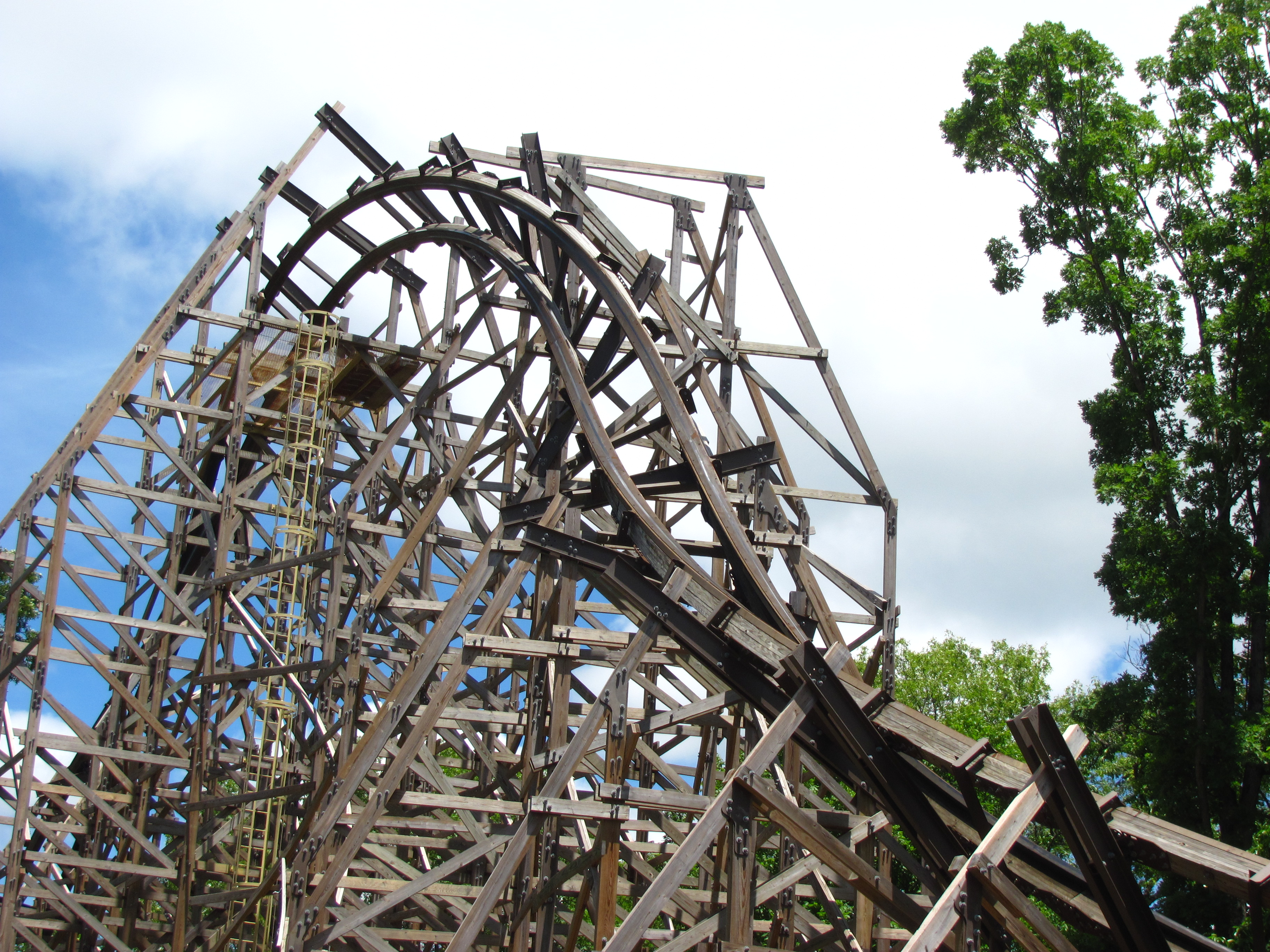
One of the inversions

The train exits out of the station and climbs the chain lift hill first. The track then goes through a small pre-drop, similar to that on Bolliger & Mabillard steel roller coasters, before dropping 162 feet (49 m) at an angle of 81°. The train then ascends the first element, which is an outside banked turn, where the track is banked over to 153° before rolling back out of the bank. After going around a low-to-the-ground curve, the train enters a 100-foot-tall (30 m) double down followed by a 70-foot-tall (21 m) double up. This is followed by a left turn into a "twist and turn" element, which is then followed by a "wave turn" that drops to the right into a small airtime hill known as a high-speed float. Outlaw Run's final two inversions are heartline rolls, where the rotation axis occurs at approximately chest level. The train then enters the brake run and returns to the station. A single ride cycle is completed in approximately 1 minute and 27 seconds.

== Records ==
Outlaw Run debuted with the steepest drop, 81°, on any wooden roller coaster in the world at the time. Although the creators of Outlaw Run originally planned to claim the record for the only operating wooden roller coaster to feature inversions, the announcement of Hades 360 at Mt. Olympus Water & Theme Park in Wisconsin Dells, Wisconsin, forced Silver Dollar City to modify their claim; they now cite Outlaw Run as the only wooden roller coaster to feature multiple inversions. It is also the fifth fastest wooden roller coaster in the world, with a top speed of 68 miles per hour (109 km/h). The speed, height, and drop angle records were broken by Goliath at Six Flags Great America in the first half of 2014. Goliath is another Rocky Mountain Construction roller coaster. Outlaw Run retains the record for the wooden roller coaster with the most inversions, tied with another RMC coaster, Wildfire at Kolmården Wildlife Park in Norrköping, Sweden.

== Reception ==
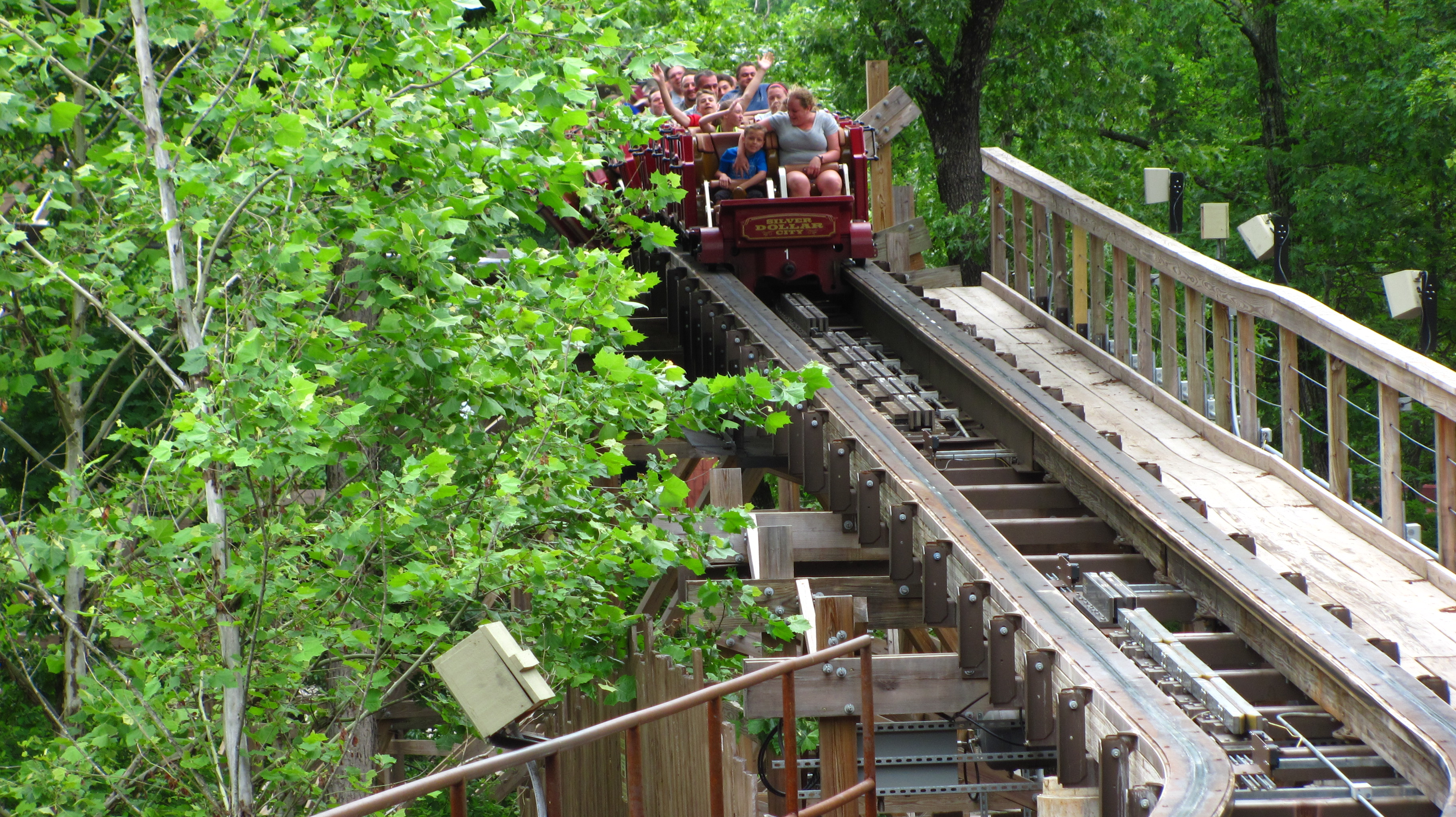
Outlaw Run's brake run

Following the announcement of Outlaw Run, the ride's layout received favorable reviews. Arthur Levine of About.com said that "the coaster appears to have a great layout and should provide the kind of ride that fans adore". Brady MacDonald of the Los Angeles Times ranked Outlaw Run in his top 13 most anticipated new theme park attractions in the United States for 2013.

Outlaw Run received largely positive reviews following the ride's opening in 2013. Marcus Leshock of WGN-TV was among the first to ride Outlaw Run. Despite his high expectations, he described it as "a great ride; an incredible ride". Brandy McDonnell of The Oklahoman described Outlaw Run as the highlight of Silver Dollar City: "it's a speedy and spine-tingling ride worth waiting a few hours to take". Tim Baldwin of Roller Coaster Magazine described Outlaw Run as "exhilarating but not intimidating" and "satisfying to the thrill seekers and fun for moms as well". Justin Garvanovic of First Drop Magazine, after describing pacing as an important characteristic of a roller coaster, said "So many coasters get it wrong. Outlaw Run gets it right."

In its debut year, Outlaw Run ranked highly in Amusement Today's Golden Ticket Awards. The ride won the Golden Ticket Award for Best New Ride with 45% of the vote. It also ranked as the seventh-best wooden roller coaster worldwide.

Golden Ticket Awards: Top wood Roller Coasters
Year									1998	1999
Ranking									–	–
Year	2000	2001	2002	2003	2004	2005	2006	2007	2008	2009
Ranking	–	–	–	–	–	–	–	–	–	–
Year	2010	2011	2012	2013	2014	2015	2016	2017	2018	2019
Ranking	–	–	–	7	9	8	8	9	7	8
Year	2020	2021	2022	2023	2024	2025	2026			
Ranking	N/A	9	9	10	11	11	9			

Preceded by T Express	World's Steepest Wooden Roller Coaster; March 15, 2013 – June 19, 2014	Succeeded by Goliath
