= S. Fred Prince =

Naturalist, and self-taught botanical and scientific illustrator (1855–1949)

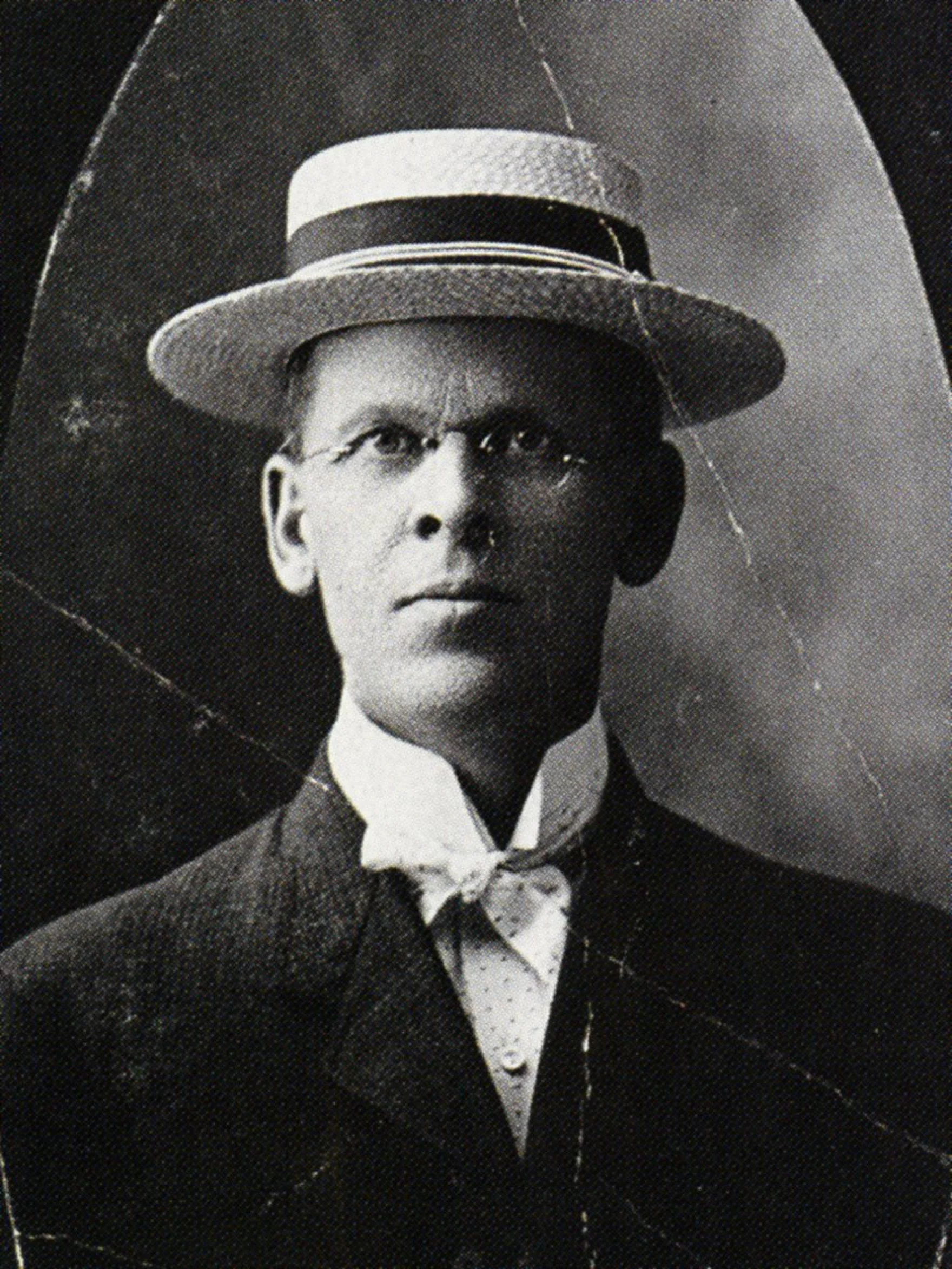
S. Fred Prince, circa 1907

S. Fred Prince (1856–1949) was an American naturalist and self-taught scientific artist and botanical illustrator. He produced a large body of writings documenting Marvel Cave in Missouri, as well as illustrated manuscripts on plant life such as flowers and ferns, violets, and animal life such as insects. He was also a cave explorer and surveyor.

== Early life and education ==
Prince was born in Philadelphia, Pennsylvania as Samuel Webb (Fred) Prince on May 26, 1856. He was raised in Chicago and Wisconsin where he worked to pay for his two brother's education.

Prince attended classes at the Warrensburg Normal School, the University of Illinois at Urbana, Springfield Normal School, the University of Nebraska.

== Biography ==
Prince was a self-taught artist and amateur scientist who worked throughout his life on largely-unpublished writings and illustrations of caves, as well as flora and fauna.. His illustrated manuscripts documented insects, and plant life.

In 1881, Prince took a job in Chicago; there he worked as an engraver, printer and bookbinder. He remained employed in this industry until 1892. In the following year, 1893, Prince suffered a "breakdown" after his fiancée died unexpectedly. The Missouri Ozarks, and Marvel Cave in particular called him back. He wrote at the time: "I experienced a breakdown in 1893 and was taken into the Ozark forest where I dedicated ten years." Prince settled near Marvel Cave in Missouri, (previously called Marble Cave). Inside the cave he discovered an underground spring, from which he drank the water as a balm to aid in his emotional healing. He referred to the spring water as a "fountain of youth."

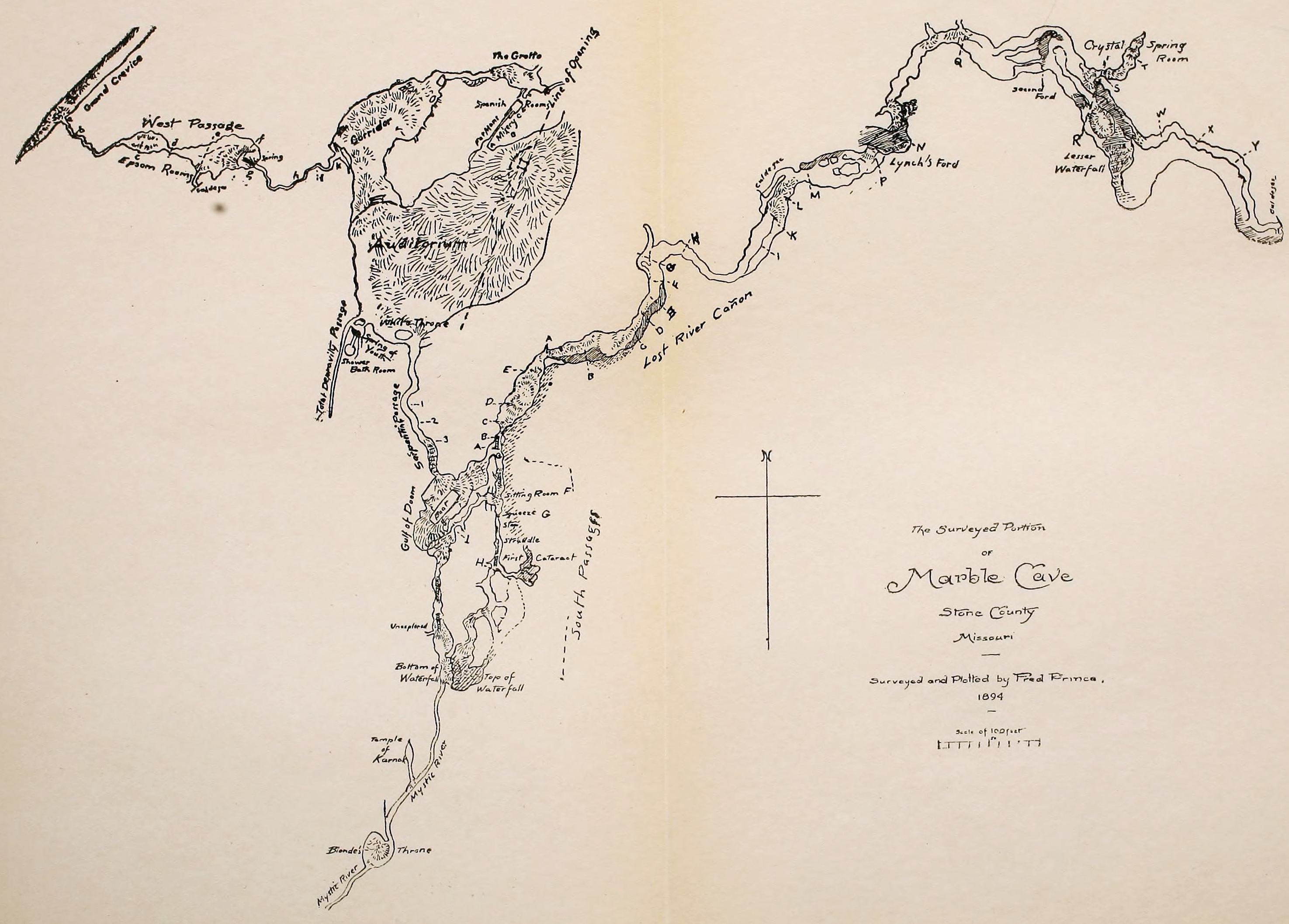
Surveyed Portion of Marble (Marvel) Cave, Stone County Missouri, surveyed and plotted by S. Fred Prince, 1894

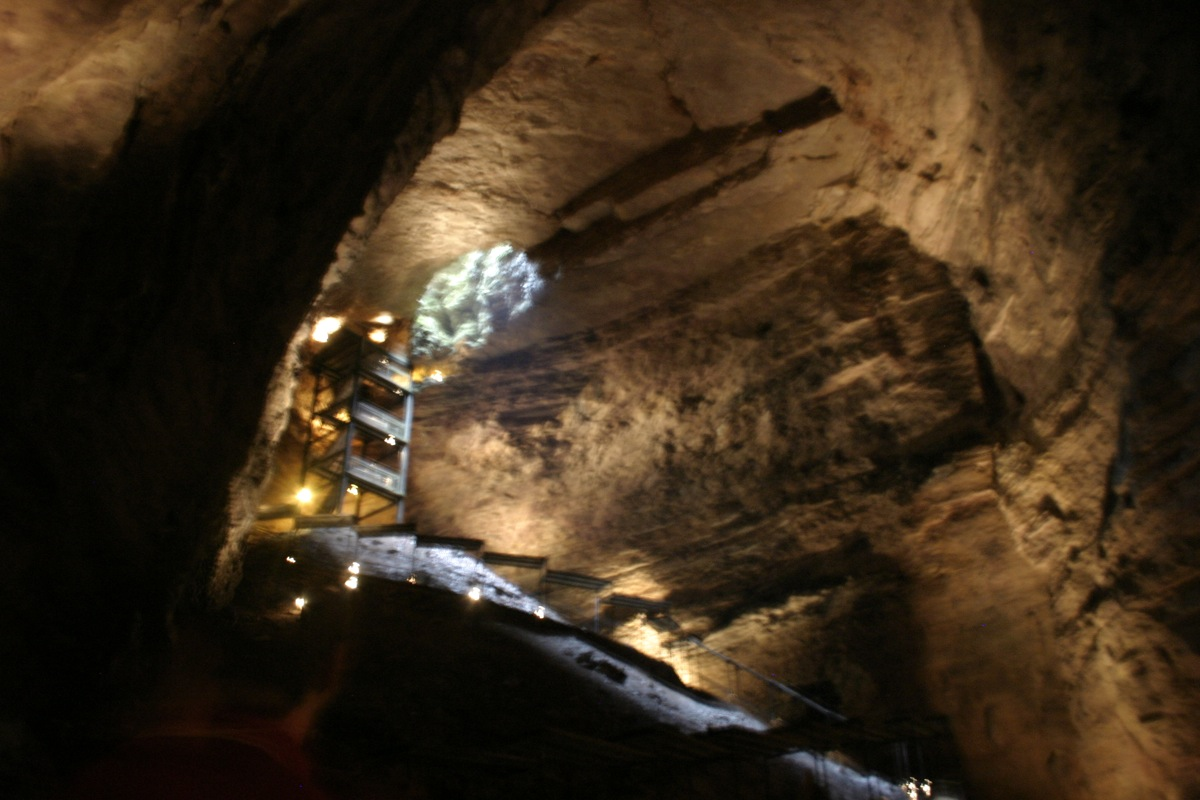
Marvel Cave Cathedral Room in 2007

That same year he was hired as a surveyor by William Henry Lynch, the landowner of the cave. Lynch was interested in the deposits of bat guano, which used commercially as fertilizer; he was also interested in developing the cave into a tourist attraction. The two men explored the cave extensively and camped in it often for weeks at a time. Prince coordinated and conducted the first organized survey of the cave, and created numerous illustrations and an extensive map of the cave. His illustrations and maps have been reproduced in books such as the Cave Regions of the Ozarks and Black Hills. Princes illustration work was also used in tourist pamphlets of the area, as the cave later became a tourist attraction.

Prince invented his own specialized surveying tools; he describes the cave-surveying process as "learning to read the pages of a wonderful story written in their rocks and the spaces between, the story of the beginnings of a new world." He described the darkness of the cave and its constant temperature as "a blessed stillness." In 1899 Prince completed the surveying and mapping project.

Prince also operated as a tour guide of Marvel Cave and also Fairy Cave, located nearby.

In 1919 he was hired as an illustrator at Kansas State Agricultural College.

== Bibliography of works by Prince ==
- Prince, S. Fred. The Ozarkian Uplift and the Marvel Caverns, 1933
- Prince, S. Fred. The Marvel Caverns, 1935
- Prince, S. Fred. The Woodland Book, (1893–1932)

== Legacy ==
Prince's papers, as well as interviews with and articles about him are held in the State Historical Society of Missouri. The manuscript works of Prince dating from 1857–1949 are held in the archives of the University of Dayton.
