= Mystic River Falls =

Water ride at Silver Dollar City

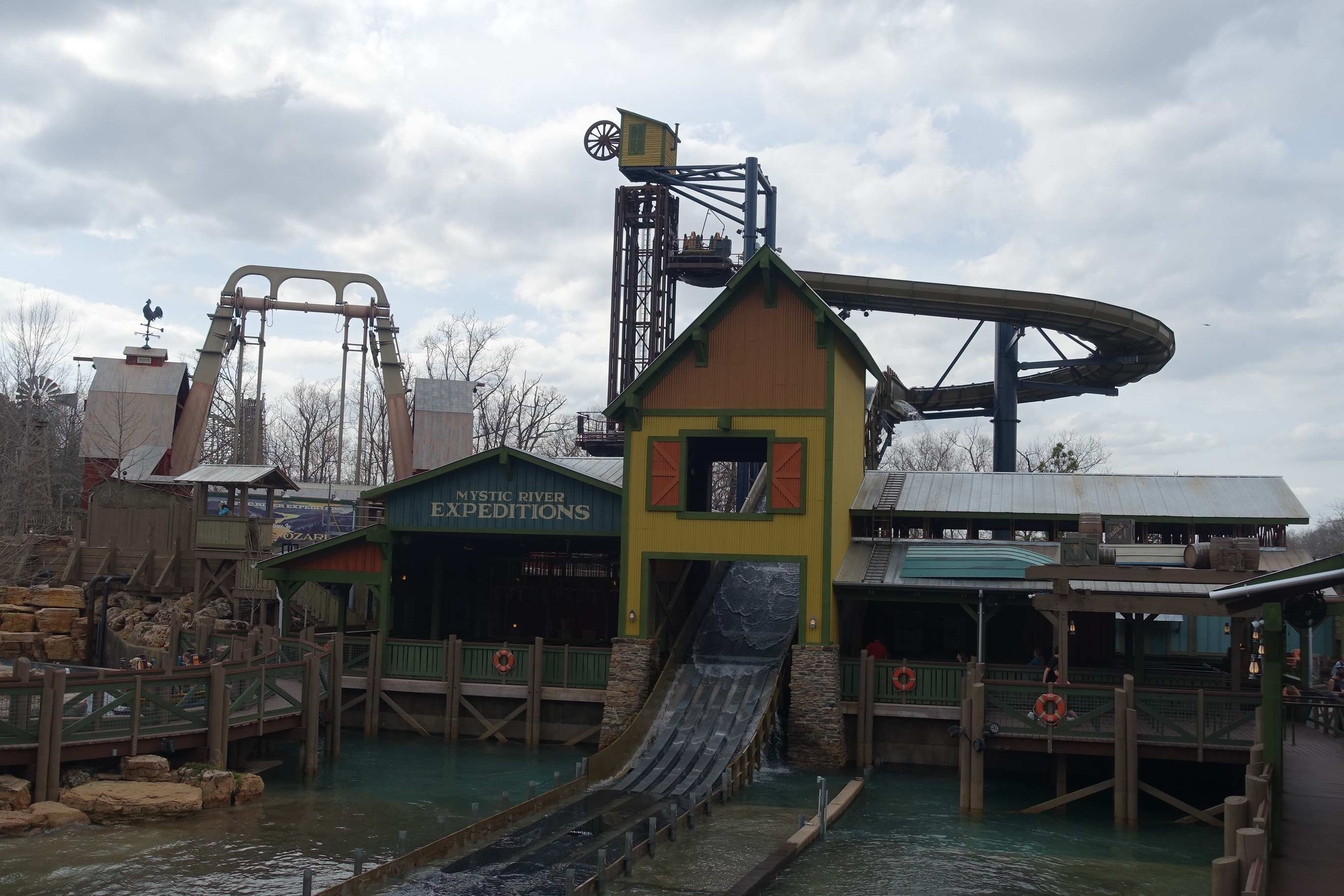

Silver Dollar City
- Area: Rivertown
- Coordinates: 36.670589°N 93.339590°W
- Status: Operating
- Cost: $23,000,000
- Soft opening date: July 5, 2020
- Opening date: July 21, 2020
- Replaced: Lost River of the Ozarks

General statistics
- Manufacturer: Ride Engineers Switzerland
- Designer: Barr Engineering
- Model: River raft ride
- Lift system: Elevator lift
- Height: 82 ft (25 m)
- Drop: 45 ft (14 m)
- Length: 2,100 ft (640 m)
- Duration: 5:30
- Boats: 18 boats. Riders are arranged 4 across in 2 rows for a total of 8 riders per boat.
- Height restriction: 40–77 in (102–196 cm)
- Website: Official website

Mystic River Falls is a river raft ride located at Silver Dollar City in Branson, Missouri. The ride is an upgraded installation and direct replacement of the former Lost River of the Ozarks attraction, which was removed following the 2018 season, as well as an investment to celebrate the park's 60th anniversary. As of its construction in 2020, Mystic River Falls holds the record for the Western Hemisphere's highest drop on a raft slide at 45 feet (14 m) tall, as well as a total linear length of 2,100 feet (640 m) and a unique elevator lift. Mystic River Falls soft opened for members on July 5, 2020 and officially opened to the public on July 21, 2020.

== History ==
In January 2019, a representative from Silver Dollar City confirmed to media sources that the popular Lost River of the Ozarks raft ride, which opened in 1985, had been retired and fenced off to allow for the construction of a new project for 2020. On April 3, 2019, Silver Dollar City, LLC filed three trademarks that were quickly deduced to be in direct correlation with the project; Lost Caverns, Pearl's Float Trip, and Mystic River Falls. Throughout 2019, the site and much of the area around it would be razed, and speculation of a new water ride began after concrete troughs began to take shape on the construction site. In June/July 2019, park socials began to post cryptic teasers referring to their new project, drawing ties to the local Marvel Cave landmark and using the hashtag #LostCaverns, eventually confirming August 13, 2019 as the set announcement date.

As promised, on August 13, 2019, Mystic River Falls was formally announced alongside the brand new Rivertown area and amenities, and would celebrate the park's 60th anniversary that year. Billed as the park's largest investment yet at a cost of $23,000,000 (with the surrounding area costing an additional $4,000,000), Mystic River Falls would incorporate a blend of fictional and local history and include an elevated river channel section and the tallest drop on a raft ride in the Western Hemisphere at 45 feet (14 m) tall. In October and November 2019, the park would endure legal turmoil over the ride, as an Orange County man sued the park over the ride's name being too similar as to that of his homemade dark ride, named Mystic Motel. Silver Dollar City responded in turn with a counter-lawsuit, stating that they had trademarked the name several months prior and that there had been a full opportunity to oppose the name. The final outcome of the lawsuit remains unclear, although changes would come to the ride as a result.

Although the COVID-19 pandemic forced a temporary halt on construction, the ride was not delayed from its targeted opening period. In June 2020, shortly after major construction had commenced on the attraction, Mystic River Falls would begin testing and sending rafts around the course. On July 5, 2020, Mystic River Falls would soft-open and begin loading members of the public. A few weeks later, the ride had its official grand opening on July 21, 2020.

== Ride experience ==
=== Queue ===
Just outside the main entrance, there is an extended queue area with switchback sections. Riders ascend stairs and take a walkway over the attraction's final turn, bypassing the station and instead heading towards two main sets of switchbacks located in buildings on either side of the ride's final major drop. These buildings represent the base camp of the fictional Mystic River Expeditions touring company, and include a wide assortment of themed elements, such as maps of the Music River and Marvel Cave, promotional posters, crates, various dinghies, lifebuoys, paddles, and an expedition log. Riders then proceed to the station, where they are loaded onto the boats.

=== Onride ===
Once dispatched, riders make a left turn into the primary conveyor belt lift, before being launched into the “river” portion of the ride. For two to three minutes, riders make their way through a twisting layout, which is packed with rapids, dripping waterfalls and tight passages. This concludes just after a tunnel, in which signs warn the riders of an upcoming mine shaft, and a second conveyor belt leads to the loading zone for the ride's signature-elevator lift and elevated section. As the elevator rises, the tower structure spins a full 180° and dispatches the raft into a high-speed 270° helix, offering riders panoramic views of the Ozarks. Following this, the raft immediately plunges down the ride's well-known 45 feet (14 m)-tall drop, landing in the splashdown lagoon and soaking all on board. The raft makes one final, slow left turn, and then re-enters the station. Although the official ride time is listed as 5:30 minutes, the ride can take up to 8 minutes to navigate.

== Characteristics ==
=== Theme ===
In the 1880s, Marvel Cave was acquired by William Henry Lynch, a Canadian miner and dairyman. Lynch and his two daughters, Miriam and Genevieve, would form a touring company, and later hire cave explorer S. Fred Prince for his experience. Prince, a keen explorer and writer, would go on to explore Marvel Cave in depth, in the process documenting and mapping out the entire system with one major exception; the leads of the so-called Mystic River passage remained unclear. Over the years, the mystery of what lay ahead would become unbearable, and a local citizen, Pearl Brazen, would begin to launch expeditions on foot and raft alongside the Lynch sisters in the hopes of finding the way to the Mystic River Passage, which could only possibly be accessed through the Mystic River Falls.

In the present day (dubbed to be in the 1880s), Pearl and her husband Leo run the Mystic River Expeditions touring company and challenge anybody willing to explore and find the hidden passageway.

=== Statistics ===
Mystic River Falls has a total linear length of 2,100-foot (640 m), which is traversed in approximately 5–8 minutes. The ride utilizes 18 different 8-seater rafts, which are propelled along by a maximum water flow of 200,000 gallons per minute. The attraction's most prominent feature is the elevator lift tower into the elevated river channel. The river channel has a lower flow rate and functions like that of an oversized waterslide; measuring 180 feet (55 m) in length, it is said to be elevated up to 66 feet (20 m) off the ground. This is accessed by the elevator lift, and finishes with the ride's signature, 45 feet (14 m) final drop.

The elevator lift on the ride is unique to Mystic River Falls, and the first of its kind to be used in the attractions industry. The tower has four rising platforms on either side, which allows for rafts to be raised to the top, while others are dispatching and loading onto the tower, all while slowly spinning. Other elevator lift towers prior have only been able to utilize up to two at a time (e.g. that of Cobra's Curse at Busch Gardens Tampa).

=== Contractors ===
Mystic River Falls was a joint project between Silver Dollar City, Barr Engineering, and Ride Engineers Switzerland (RES). Barr Engineering has major levels of expertise in the planning and design of water rides, with past projects including Popeye & Bluto's Bilge-Rat Barges at Universal Islands of Adventure, Smoky Mountain River Rampage at Dollywood, and various water attractions at Dorney Park and Valleyfair. Ride Engineers Switzerland, based in Altendorf, Switzerland, is an amusement rides firm founded around 2016 by various former staff members of Swiss firm abc rides, which had been bought out by Intamin in 2016. As abc, the engineering staff had been well known and renowned for their raft ride systems, and brought the experience with them to RES.

== Similar attractions ==
Infinity Falls is an Intamin river raft ride located at SeaWorld Orlando in Orlando, Florida, and opened in the Fall of 2018. The ride formerly held the world record for the tallest drop on a raft slide at 40 feet (12 m) tall, beating Phantasialand's River Quest (Brühl, Germany), which had a 36-foot (11 m) drop. This title was lost to Mystic River Falls upon opening, whose drop exceeded that of Infinity Falls by an extra 5 feet (1.5 m). It also has a length of 1,520 feet (460 m) and a top height of 30 feet (9.1 m) aboveground. These stats were surpassed by Mystic River Fall's 2,100-foot (640 m) length and a tower height of 82 feet (25 m).
