= Giant Barn Swing =

Ride at Silver Dollar City

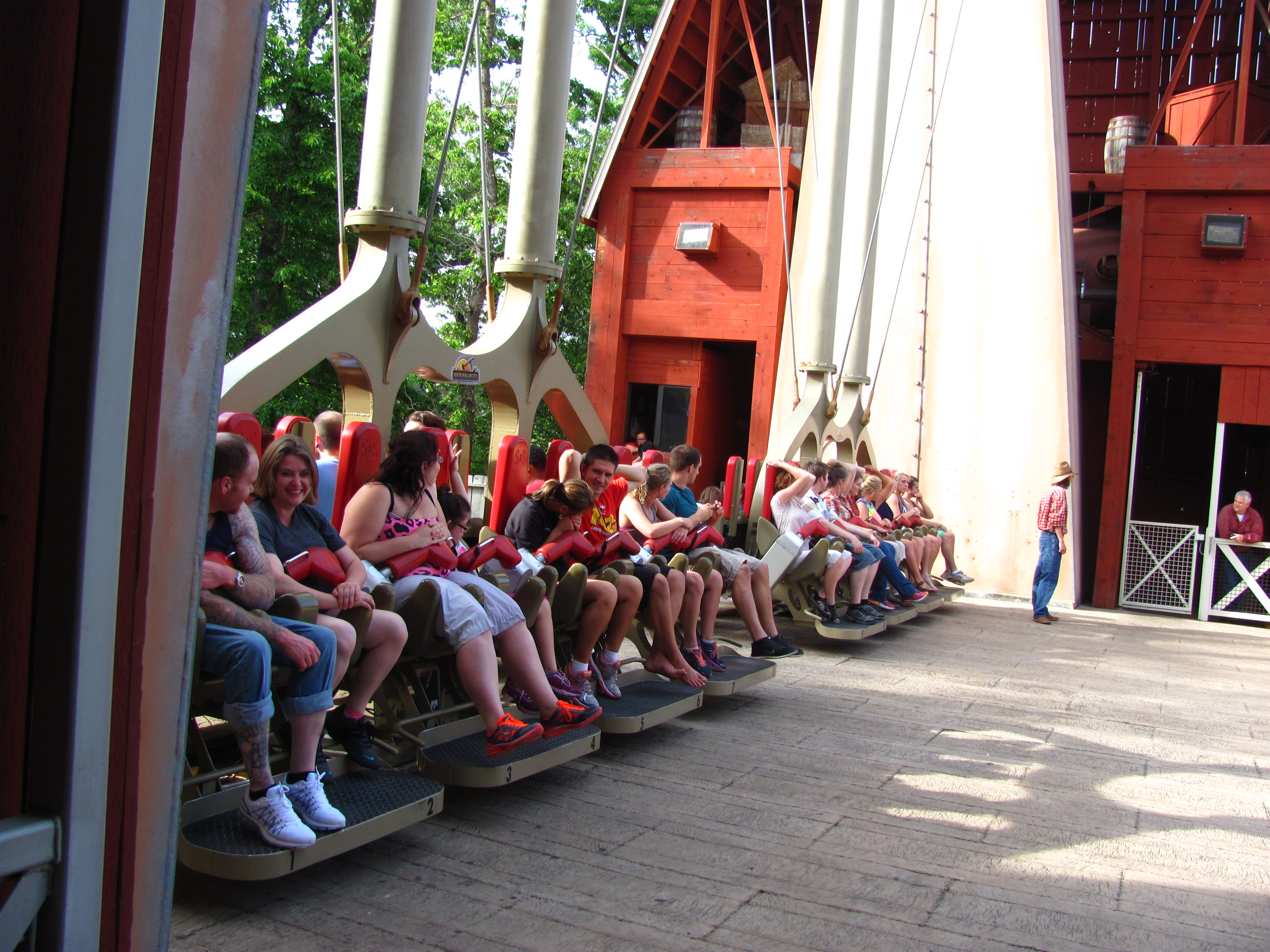

Silver Dollar City
- Area: Wilson Farms
- Status: Operating
- Opening date: April 14, 2007

Ride statistics
- Manufacturer: S&S - Sansei Technologies
- Model: Screamin' Swing
- Speed: 45 mph (72 km/h)
- Duration: Approximately 70 seconds
- Height restriction: 48 in (122 cm)

Giant Barn Swing is a Screamin' Swing style amusement ride designed and built by American manufacturer S&S – Sansei Technologies located at Silver Dollar City in Branson, Missouri. Assembly for this ride began in January 2007 and it was opened on April 14, 2007. The ride was and installed by Ride Entertainment Group.

== Ride experience ==
The Giant Barn Swing is loaded, and sometimes operators will only operate one pendulum to save electricity if few people are in line for the ride. The restraint consists of an over-the-lap bar with a safety belt attached on the end in case the lap bar comes up during the ride. Due to the lap bar, some larger people may not be able to ride. The ride begins by swinging forward and backwards, slowly starting to swing higher and higher. At the crest, the ride swings over seven stories, almost carrying riders upside down, getting a view of Mystic River Falls. Once the ride has crested, it slowly starts to swing lower and shorter distances, until it comes to a complete stop.
