= Grand Exposition Coaster =

Roller coaster at Silver Dollar City

Grand Expostion Coaster
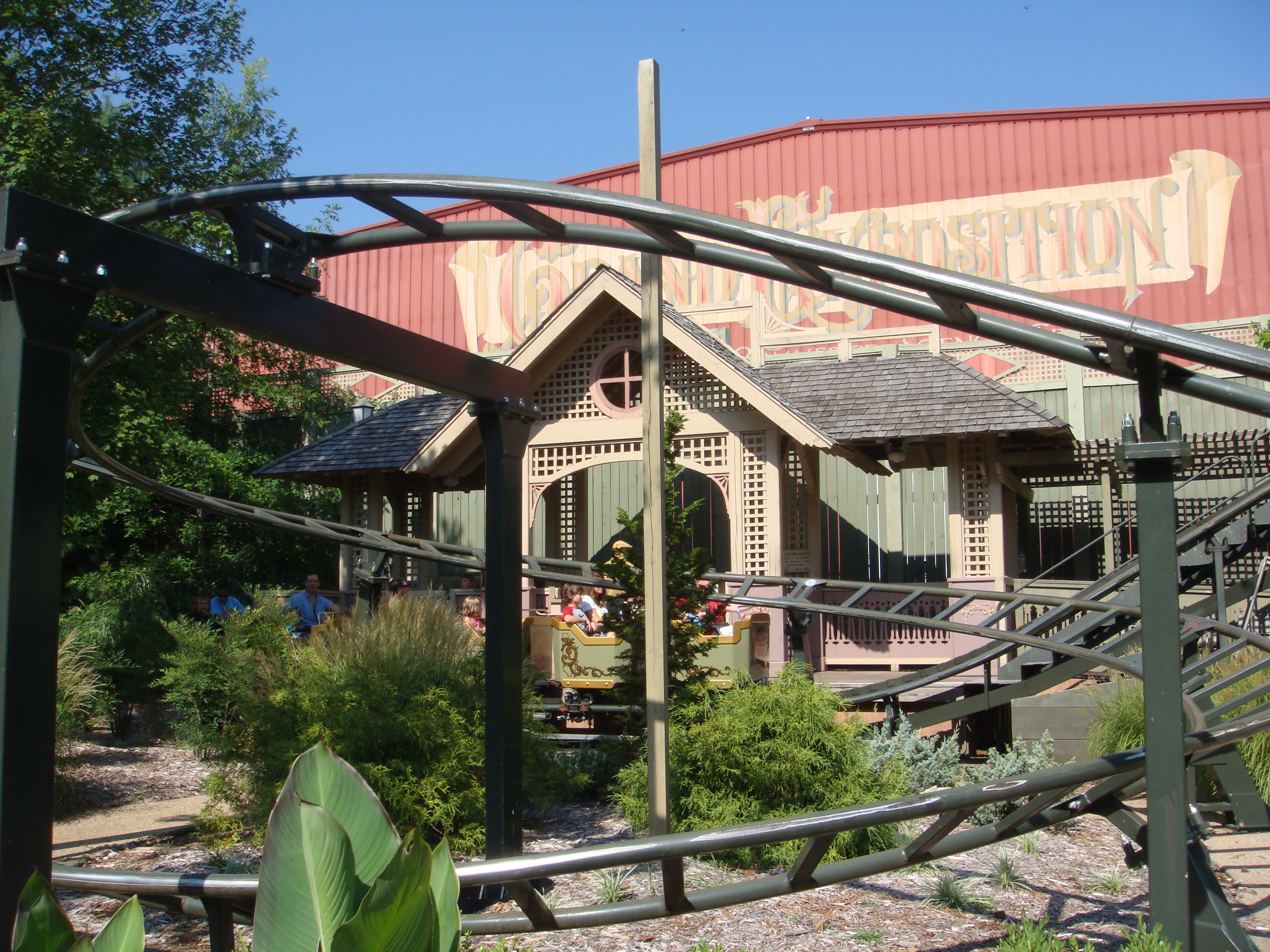

Silver Dollar City
- Location: Silver Dollar City
- Coordinates: 36.670433°N 93.336585°W
- Status: Operating
- Opening date: April 2006

General statistics
- Type: Steel – Kiddie
- Manufacturer: Zamperla
- Model: Family gravity coaster 80STD
- Height: 10 ft (3.0 m)
- Length: 280 ft (85 m)
- Trains: Single train with 6 cars; riders arranged 2 across in a single row for a total of 12 riders per train
- Grand Expostion Coaster at RCDB

The Grand Exposition Coaster is a children's steel roller coaster located at Silver Dollar City in Branson, Missouri that opened in April 2006. It is believed to be a replacement of Runaway Ore Cart. The Grand Exposition Coaster was built by Zamperla of Italy as part of an area of the park dubbed "The Grand Exposition".

The ride consists of little more than a small drop and upwards helix, traversed by the train three times for each ride cycle. Guests go through a short walkway, takes a left turn and into the station. The ride immediately starts with a small incline. After the crest, riders go through the small drop into the helix. Riders then make a right-hand U-turn into the station. Trains complete three laps of the coaster's track each ride.
