= Powder Keg: A Blast into the Wilderness =

Roller coaster at Silver Dollar City

Powder Keg
- Previously known as Buzz Saw Falls (1999-2003)
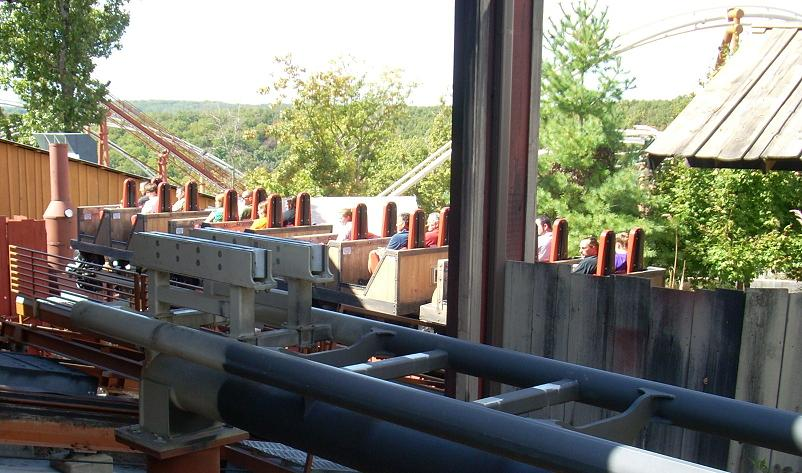

Silver Dollar City
- Coordinates: 36.669733°N 93.342961°W
- Status: Operating
- Opening date: April 8, 2005
- Cost: $10,000,000

Silver Dollar City
- Name: Buzzsaw Falls
- Coordinates: 36.6697°N 93.343°W
- Status: Removed
- Opening date: July 3, 1999
- Closing date: 2003
- Cost: $7,000,000
- Replaced by: Powder Keg

General statistics
- Type: Steel
- Manufacturer: S&S – Sansei Technologies
- Designer: Drew Schlie
- Lift/launch system: 3 types Transfer Track, Compressed Air Launch, and Chain lift hill
- Height: 98 ft (30 m)
- Drop: 110 ft (34 m)
- Length: 3,506 ft (1,069 m)
- Speed: 64 mph (103 km/h)
- Inversions: 0
- Duration: 2:53
- Max vertical angle: 76°
- Capacity: 1000 riders per hour
- Acceleration: 0–53 mph in 2.8 seconds
- G-force: 3.9
- Height restriction: 42 in (107 cm)
- Trains: 3 trains with 4 cars; riders arranged 2 across in 2 rows for a total of 16 riders per train
- Must transfer from wheelchair
- Powder Keg at RCDB

Powder Keg: A Blast Into The Wilderness (commonly referred to as Powder Keg) is a steel launched roller coaster located at Silver Dollar City in Branson, Missouri. Manufactured by S&S Power, now S&S Sansei Technologies and installed by Ride Entertainment Group, the ride opened to the public in 2005. Powder Keg has the second longest track length for an attraction at Silver Dollar City, only behind the Frisco Silver Dollar Line.

The original ride was named Buzzsaw Falls, a Premier Rides Water coaster. Several of the original elements and track from Buzzsaw Falls were kept when the ride was converted into Powder Keg by S&S, mainly the lift structure. Floating sections of Buzzsaw Falls can still be seen on the converted ride today. Other tributes to the former ride can be found in the thematic elements surrounding the queue line, such as an old Buzzsaw Falls car stuck in the roof of the first queue building, and a piece of old Buzzsaw track sticking out of the queue building's roof.

== History ==
=== Buzzsaw Falls (1999–2003) ===
On September 25, 1998, Silver Dollar City announced that they would be building their next roller coaster. It was scheduled to open in 1999, six years after Thunderation. The park hired Premier Rides to design a one-of-a-kind prototype model known as a Liquid Coaster. This new water coaster model would feature a log flume portion and a roller coaster portion. It would sit in a 6-acre (2.4 ha) plot of land surrounded by trees and hilly terrain. While the ride was set to be named Ripsaw Falls, the name was changed to Buzzsaw Falls. The ride would cost $7 million to build.

The attraction was going to open on May 16, 1999, but the opening was delayed due to mechanical flaws. Buzzsaw Falls officially opened to the general public on July 3, 1999.

Buzzsaw Falls operated sporadically due to several maintenance issues. Each ride vehicle featured plastic shields on both sides to prevent flooding. They were movable and wouldn't allow guests to enter or exit the vehicle. The ride featured infrared sensors, which became extremely sensitive to interference. In addition, Buzzsaw Falls could not run without water, and had to be pumped constantly. This ongoing issue led to high operational costs.

=== Powder Keg: A Blast Into The Wilderness (2005–present) ===
In 2003, Buzzsaw Falls was closed to undergo a major refurbishment. S&S Power would convert the water coaster into a launched coaster. The remodel would feature some new track and a compressed air launch, while keeping the original chain lift hill and some track from Buzzsaw Falls.

On November 6, 2004, it was announced that the new ride would be named Powder Keg: A Blast Into The Wilderness. In March 2005, the ride completed its first test runs. At a cost of $10 million, Powder Keg opened on April 8, 2005.

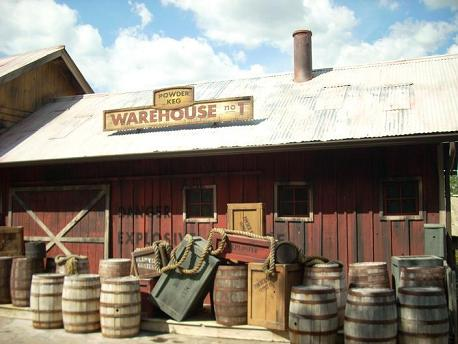
Exterior of the launch building. Each time the coaster is launched flames shoot from the chimney and water bursts from the barrels.

== Rider experience ==
As the ride exits the station, an elevator system moves the train up and to the left into the launch area. After being launched out onto the track, riders go up a relatively small hill and down a very steep drop. Riders go up and down hills many times and through several tight turns before slowly traveling up a chain lift hill equipped with audio speakers playing bluegrass music. The train goes through a 90-degree left turn before going down another steep drop onto a small spray-painted blue section of the track. At the end of the ride, the train travels through a large helix that almost turns the track completely upside down before it enters the final brake run and turns into the station.
