= Marvel Cave =

Large cave in Stone County, Missouri, US

- Marble Cave
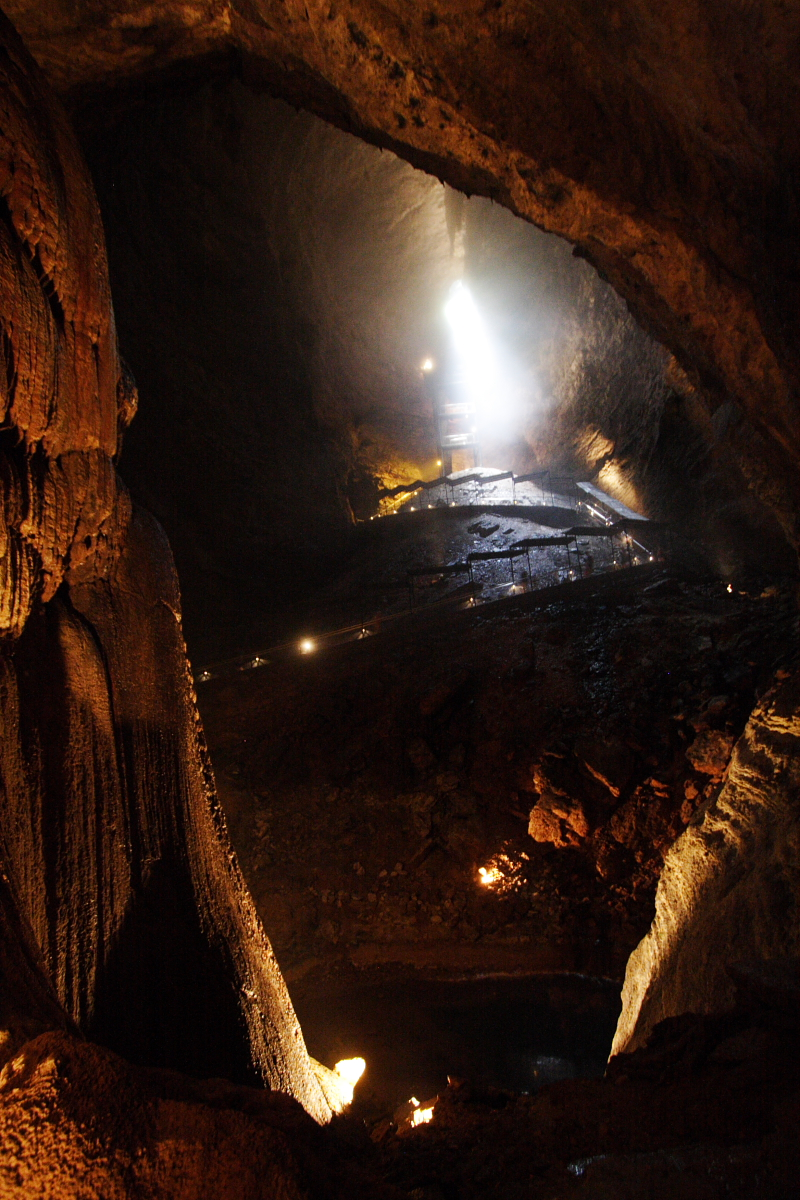
- Marvel Cave Cathedral Room
- Interactive map of Marvel Cave
- Location: Silver Dollar City, Branson, Missouri, United States
- Coordinates: 36.6675°N 93.3397°W
- Depth: 500 ft (152 m)
- Discovery: 16th century
- Entrances: 2
- Access: Private (Tours on park operating days)
- Show cave opened: 1894
- Show cave length: 60 minutes
- Lighting: Electric
- Features: Flowstone, Stalagmites, Stalactites, Waterfall
- Website: http://www.silverdollarcity.com/theme-park/attractions/rides/Marvel-Cave.aspx

Marvel Cave is a privately owned cave located just west of Branson, Missouri, in Stone County. It is one of the main attractions of Silver Dollar City and is registered as a National Natural landmark.

The first recorded expedition of the cave was in 1869, led by Henry T. Blow. Marvel Cave was originally called Marble Cave, after explorers in 1882 saw what they thought was marble on the cave's ceiling. This started the Marble Cave Mining Company, although later it was realized that there was never any marble in the cave. The Marble Cave Mining Company ceased all operations after only four and a half years. William Lynch purchased the cave in 1889, and soon after opened the cave to the public. In 1950, Hugo Herschend leased the cave for 99 years. The Herschends made renovations to the cave, and later opened the popular theme park, Silver Dollar City, on the surface above the cave. Marvel Cave is one of the largest caves in Missouri, with one of the largest cave entry rooms (the Cathedral Room) of any cave in North America, and is one of the longest running tourist attractions in the Ozarks.

== History ==
=== The Bald Knobbers ===
According to Silver Dollar City park legend, a local group of vigilantes who later turned into outlaws called the Bald Knobbers were known for throwing people through the sinkhole into Devil's Den around the mid 19th century. Though it's possible that roving Bushwhackers and outlaws could have chosen to dispose of their victims through this sinkhole, the Bald Knobbers did not form until 1883 (starting-up in neighboring Taney County) and were replaced by an unofficial chapter in 1886 within nearby Christian County, with unofficial chapters in other counties (including Stone County, where the cave is located) later than that.

Despite there being no written evidence to substantiate it, it's possible that Stone County's unofficial Bald Knobbers used the cave sometime in 1889, between the time the mining operations ceased and late October of that year when it was purchased for sightseeing tours.

=== Early explorers ===
There is evidence that the Spanish explored the cave in 1541, hoping to uncover riches and possibly the fountain of youth. There is a legend that the Spanish buried gold in the cave. The first known expedition was in 1869 and led by Henry T. Blow of St. Louis, a lead mining magnate. He explored the cave with six other miners. One by one, the miners lowered themselves down into the sinkhole. They carried lanterns for light and spent hours studying the cave walls carefully searching for signs of mineral deposits. They went as far as the Shoe Room, because on one side was the Gulf of Doom, which they believed was the bottomless pit after throwing rocks down the Gulf of Doom and hearing no sound. On the other side was the Cloud Room, which was filled to the ceiling with bat guano. The miners returned to the surface late that evening having failed to discover the lead ore they sought, but were convinced that the flat ceiling of the Shoe Room contained marble. Their report gained the interest of area locals who decided to name the cave Marble Cave.

No more expeditions took place until 1882 when another group of entrepreneurs, led by Mr. T. Hodges Jones and Truman S. Powell of Barton County, entered the cave in hopes of finding lead. Jones and Powell found huge amounts of guano and the flat ceiling, which they also believed to be marble.

In 1893, S. Fred Prince, a naturalist and self-taught scientific artist was hired as a surveyor by William Lynch, the landowner of the cave at that time. The two men lived in the cave for weeks at a time to explore and survey the cave.

=== Marble Cave Mining and Manufacturing Company ===
In 1884, Mr. T. Hodge Jones bought the property and, with several of his friends, formed the Marble Cave Mining and Manufacturing Company to mine the marble from the cave. The company hired a geologist, and it was proved that what looked like marble on the ceiling of the Shoe Room was really limestone. To keep the company alive they mined out the guano and sold it for $700 a ton. The guano was used for gunpowder and fertilizer. The miners filled ore carts with guano, then the carts were pulled by donkeys to the Cathedral Room, and the carts were lifted out of the cave by a pulley system. In 1889, after four and a half years, all the guano was mined out. Marble Cave Mining, Co. closed all operations.

=== Marmaros ===
Marmaros (or Μαρμαρος, Greek for "Marble") was a small town that formed along with the Marble Cave Mining and Manufacturing Company in 1884. Originally called Marble City, it was located on the rough hilltop near the cave and recorded a plat map at the courthouse in Galena, Missouri. Marmaros contained a hotel, general store, pottery shop, white oak furniture factory, and was rumored to have a saloon. The town turned into a ghost town in 1889 after the Marble Cave Mining, Co. closed. When the Lynches bought the cave, the town was burned to the ground by the local group of vigilantes known as the Bald Knobbers.

=== The Lynches ===
On October 30, 1889, William Henry Lynch, a Canadian miner and dairyman, purchased the cave and the square mile of land around the cave where Marmaros was located for $10,000. After coming to Marvel Cave, he found that Marmaros was burnt to the ground. Lynch, with the aid of his family, proposed to open the cave to sightseers. The Lynches began operation of the sightseeing venture in 1894 with a grand celebration and a few visitors. The cave has remained open since, making it one of the oldest continuously running tourist attractions in the Ozarks.

After the 1907 publication of Harold Bell Wright's famous novel The Shepherd of the Hills, which depicts the lives of mountain people living in the Ozarks, interest in the region grew rapidly across the country. To accommodate the new influx of visitors traveling to the cave by car, Lynch was determined to bring a road from Branson to the cave. He cut brush and cleared a path for what would become Missouri Route 76, offering tourists easy access to the cave and helped establish it as a major tourist attraction by the 1920s.

When William Lynch died in 1927, ownership of the cave passed to his daughters. Shortly thereafter, the name of the cave was changed to Marvel Cave. The Lynch family operated the cave for over fifty years.

=== The Herschends ===
A Chicago vacuum cleaner salesman, Hugo Herschend, purchased a 99-year lease on the cave in 1950, from The Lynch sisters.

After Hugo Herschend's death in 1955, his wife Mary took over the day-to-day operations of the cave. With the aid of her two sons, Jack and Peter, Mary Herschend was able to make vast improvements to the cave. They added concrete paths and stairs to the cave, and a tower from the sinkhole to the top of the debris pile. Also, they added a narrow gauge funicular (cable-pulled) railway in 1957, whose trains pulled visitors a distance of 218 feet (66 m), from the depths of the cave up to the surface. Before building the cable train, the Army Corps of Engineers said that it could not be built, because a cable train can not make a turn like the one the Herschends planned. The Herschends built it anyway, and it is still in operation to this day.

Once the cable train was in operation, the Herschends decided to recreate the mining village Marmaros, for tourists waiting to go on a tour. It opened in 1960, and grew into Silver Dollar City.

In 1972 Genevieve Lynch died and bequeathed the cave to the College of the Ozarks and the First Presbyterian Church of Branson. The Herschends continue to operate the property under lease.

== Tours ==
There are two different tours offered: a Traditional Tour and a Lantern Tour.

=== Traditional tours ===
The first guided tours in the cave were in 1894 run by the Lynches. They lasted 8 hours and were by candle or lantern. Visitors climbed through the sink hole on a 100 feet (30 m) ladder down to the top of the pile. Guests were instructed to slide down the pile to the bottom, and were given a candle to guide their way. The tours included the Egyptian Room (now the Shoe Room), the Lakes Passage, and guests saw formations such as the Great White Throne (now the Liberty Bell), and the Spring Room Sentinel (now just the Sentinel). After the Herschends started tours in 1950, the wooden stairs were removed and replaced with concrete stairs and paths through the cave. Tours last for about an hour, and are limited to 45 people.

=== Lantern tour ===
In 2006, Marvel Cave started offering a Lantern Light Tour. In this tour the electric lights are turned off in the cave and lanterns are given to each member of the tour. Unlike the regular tours which are free, this tour costs $16.12, and is limited to 20 people. The tour has been extended into the Mammoth Room, making it the first tour to incorporate this room in more than fifty years. One is also able to see both the summer and fall sections if the Waterfall Room is not flooded. The tour lasts about an hour and a half. The guide focuses on the history and folklore of the cave and is able to explain more information about the cave due to the small group setting of the tour.

== Rooms and passages ==
- The Cathedral Room is one of the largest cave entrance rooms found in North America. The room measures 204 feet (62 m) high, 225 feet (69 m) wide, and 411 feet (125 m) feet long. Entrance to the cave is made through a sink hole which is 94' deep. Two large openings are at the bottom of the sink. Rocks, trees, dirt and animals falling through the sinkhole and falling boulders from the ceiling throughout the centuries has left a debris pile measuring 124 feet (38 m) tall. This pile is sometimes referred to as the Underground Mountain. On July 7, 1963, an underground altitude record was set by Don Piccard by flying a hot air balloon around the massive room. Later, in 1994 five hot air balloons were flown simultaneously in the Cathedral Room in celebration of the 100th anniversary of giving cave tours.
- The Mammoth Room is where the majority of the bats choose to hibernate. In 1869 Spanish style ladders, small trees with notches carved in them, were found in the Mammoth Room by Henry T. Blow, one of the first known explorers of the cave.
- The Dungeon is a passage located next to the Cathedral Room. The entrance can be made through a small crevice located 80 feet (24 m) below the sinkhole entrance. Blood like stains cover the walls due to the abundance of iron oxide, which led some early cave guides to claim the Dungeon Passage a torture place of the Spanish Explorers. The passage has an entrance through the Mammoth Room as well.
- The Lakes Passage is past the Mammoth Room and contains two lakes named Genevieve and Miriam, after the daughters of William Lynch. Divers have explored the lakes and have found several underwater passages. The deepest they dived was around 110 feet (34 m). The two lakes are long and were once thought to be a river, known as No-Name River. Genevieve later led an expedition of the passage and discovered that there was an end to the water filled passages. Her party found that the cave continued up hill. The passage has not been entirely explored. The last room explorers have discovered is a tall terminal dome pit that contains two small water falls that makes climbing to the top very difficult. Many have tried but failed.
- The Spring Room A small crevice behind a tall column known as the Sentinel lies the Spring Room. The room is covered in orange calcite and contains several waterfalls that looks and sounds like rain fall. Legends have spread about the water being magical, possibly a Fountain of Youth.
- Serpentine Passage connects the Cathedral Room and the Egyptian Room. The route perfectly displays the way that water used to flow through the cave passages.
- Egyptian Room / Shoe Room Genevieve and Miriam Lynch had a fondness for the study of Egypt, and this flat smooth desert-like room reminded them of a pyramid. Among the rocks of the room they saw King Tutankhamen's Sarcophagus, The Sphinx's Nose, Arrow Head Entry, and Cleopatra's Sandal. The ceiling is shaped like a large sandal or shoe, leading some to call it the Shoe Room. The flat smooth ceiling was once mistaken for marble.
- The Gulf of Doom is located under the "heel" of the shoe print ceiling. The great pit was once thought to be bottomless. Rocks would be thrown into the darkness, but no sound would ever resonate. The superstitious thought it was a gateway to the underworld, when the true reason was simple: large amounts of clay and bat guano covered the bottom of the gulf's floor over 100' below.
- Cloud Room or Cloud Land has a rough porous ceiling. The ceiling is made of dolomite and looks like low hanging clouds.
- Tall Man's Headache / Fat Man's Misery is a passage with a low ceiling and narrow sides, the smallest passage in the guided tour. It is about 4 feet (1.2 m) 7 inches (18 cm) tall, and 7 feet (2.1 m) long.
- The Harold Bell Wright Passage is before the Waterfall Room during fall and winter tours. Harold Bell Wright, the author of The Shepherd of the Hills, was a friend of the Lynches, and stayed in the cave for days at a time. There is a cabin located in the passage where Harold Bell Wright stayed. Some people believe that he wrote parts of his book in the cave. Inside the cabin he painted a picture of his book's character, Maggie. The cabin that remains there is a replica, not the original, although it uses some of the same wood.
- The Waterfall Room is the lowest room on the tour, 505 feet (154 m) below the surface. The source of the water is from the underground stream named The Lost River. This room can flood to the ceiling during times of rain.
- The Mud Passage is located between the Waterfall Room and the Mystic Pool Room, named for the mud in the passage during early tours, which has since been cleared out.
- The Mystic River Passage is a small water filled passage that eventually opens up to the second largest room in the cave. The room is called the T Room and is in the shape of the letter T. The cave extends beyond the T Room, but the passage becomes much smaller and narrower than before. To enter the passage one must lie on their back and keep their face above the water. The passage is extremely tight and filled with mud and water causing many to call it the "Sewer Pipe." The end of the passage has not been reached.
- The Mystic Pool Room is the room in which the Mystic River Passage is located.
- The Elves Chamber is the top of the terminal dome pit extending upwards from the Mystic Pool Room. Numerous calcite formations can be seen in this area of the cave. The ceiling is filled with long stalactites and covered in helictites. The entrance to the Cable Train Tunnel is located in the Elves Chamber making it the last room on the tourist trail of Marvel Cave.

== Formations ==
- Blondie's Throne is a flowstone located near the end of the tour of the cave, the name comes from its obvious resemblance to a throne. The name "Blondie" comes from a story about a boy (Charles Smallwood) who was lost in the cave in the late 19th or early 20th century. He was later found sleeping near this formation, and the first thing they saw in the candlelight was his blonde hair. While there is a legend that some substance in the cave turned his hair blonde, it is more likely that the boy was known for his blonde hair.
- The Liberty Bell is a 55 feet (17 m) tall stalagmite, Although it started out on the ceiling near the Serpentine Passage as a stalactite. It gets its name from its shape, and the crack on its side. The crack was made when it fell from the ceiling, and now it is on the cave floor. After falling, it continued to grow on the floor. It is hollow and can fit four to five adults inside. It was originally called "The Great White Throne".
- The Sentinel is a column located in the Cathedral Room, right in front of the passage that leads to the Spring Room. It used to be referred as "The Spring Room Sentinel" Tour guides also say that it is the only thing supporting the dome of the Cathedral Room.
Marvel Cave rock formations
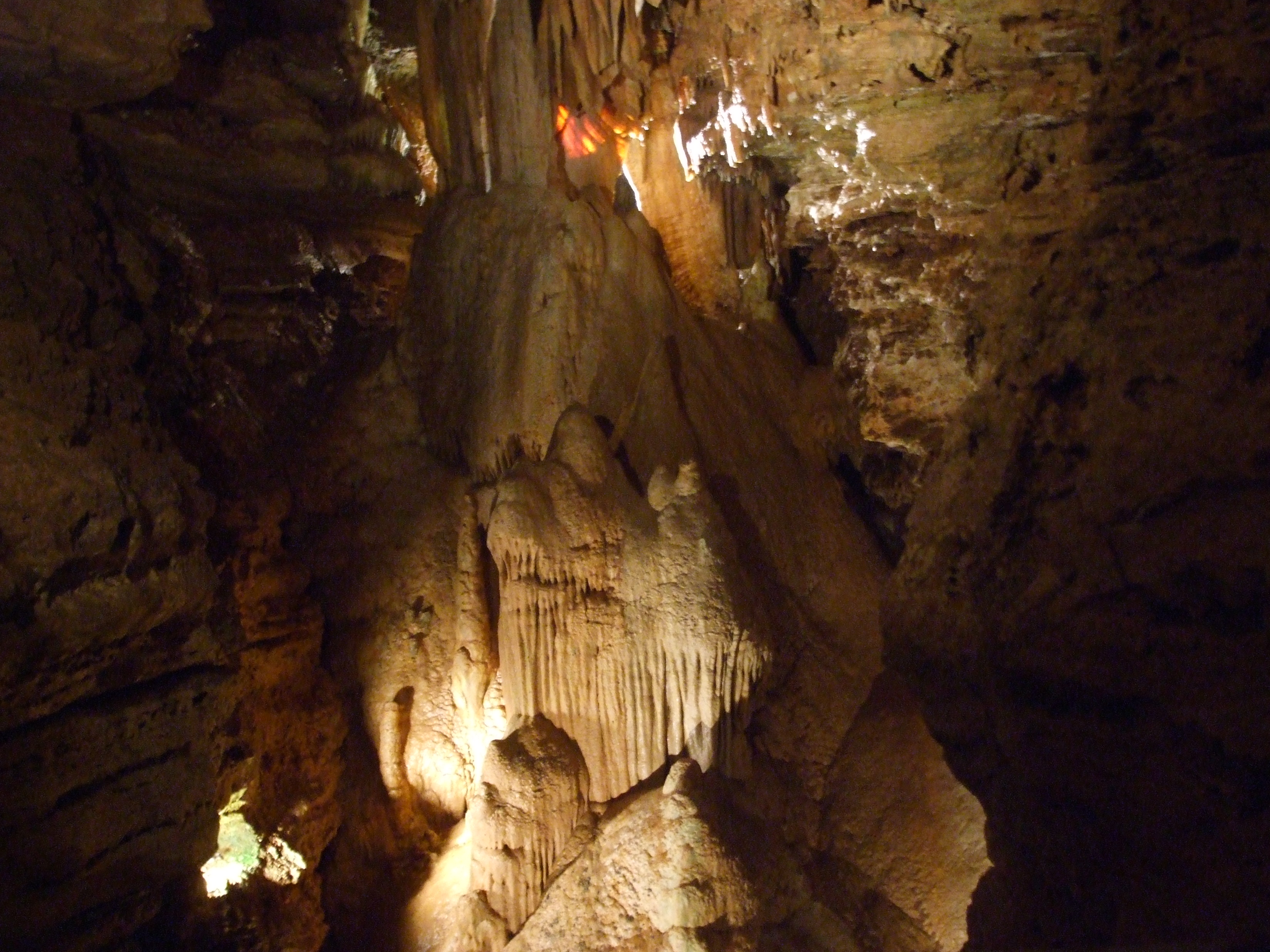
Blondie's Throne

The Sentinel

The Liberty Bell

== Life in the cave ==
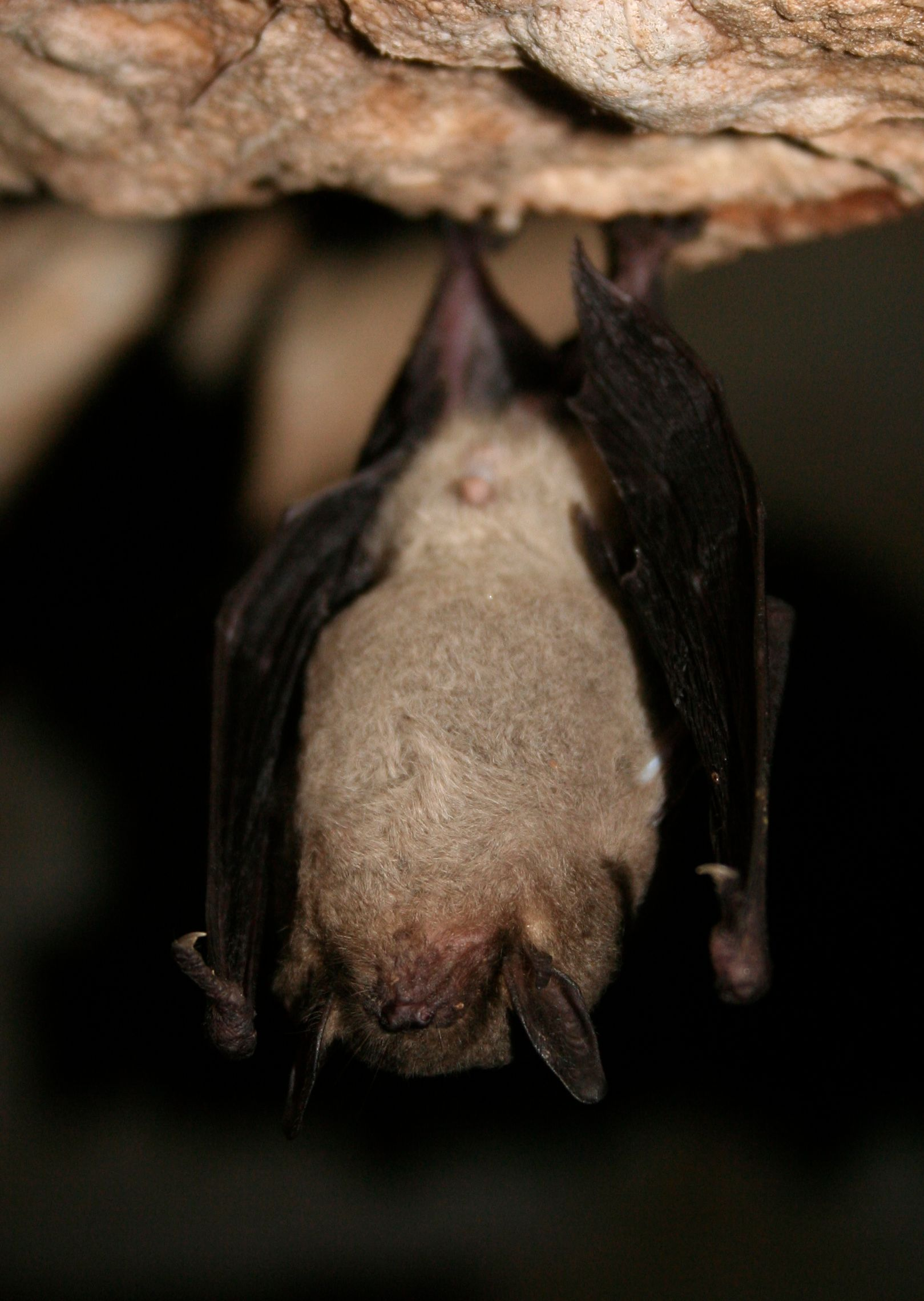
Gray bat in a hibernaculum. A colony of this species lives in Marvel Cave.

Marvel Cave is host to a variety of bats and salamanders. Marvel Cave has been recognized for its outstanding work in preserving its colony of endangered Gray Bats.

Bats

- Eastern Pipistrelle
- Little brown bat
- Big brown bat
- Gray Bat

Salamanders

- Cave Salamander
- Grotto Salamander

== See also ==
- List of funicular railways
- List of sinkholes of the United States
