= Silver Dollar City =

Amusement park in Missouri, United States

- Interactive map of Silver Dollar City
- Location: Branson, Missouri, U.S.
- Coordinates: 36.6671°N 93.3389°W
- Status: Operating
- Opened: May 1, 1960 (66 years ago)
- Owner: Herschend
- General manager: Brad Thomas
- Theme: 1880s Ozarks village
- Operating season: March – January
- Attendance: 2.2 million
- Area: 61 acres (250,000 m^{2})

Attractions
- Total: 31
- Roller coasters: 7
- Water rides: 9
- Website: silverdollarcity.com

Silver Dollar City is a 61-acre (25 ha) theme park in Stone County, Missouri, near the cities of Branson and Branson West. The park is located off of Missouri Route 76 on the Indian Point peninsula of Table Rock Lake. Silver Dollar City opened on May 1, 1960. The park is an 1880s-themed experience. Silver Dollar City's operating season runs from mid-March until early January, with the park closed during the majority of January and February. Silver Dollar City serves as the flagship park of Herschend.

== History ==
=== Marvel Cave ===
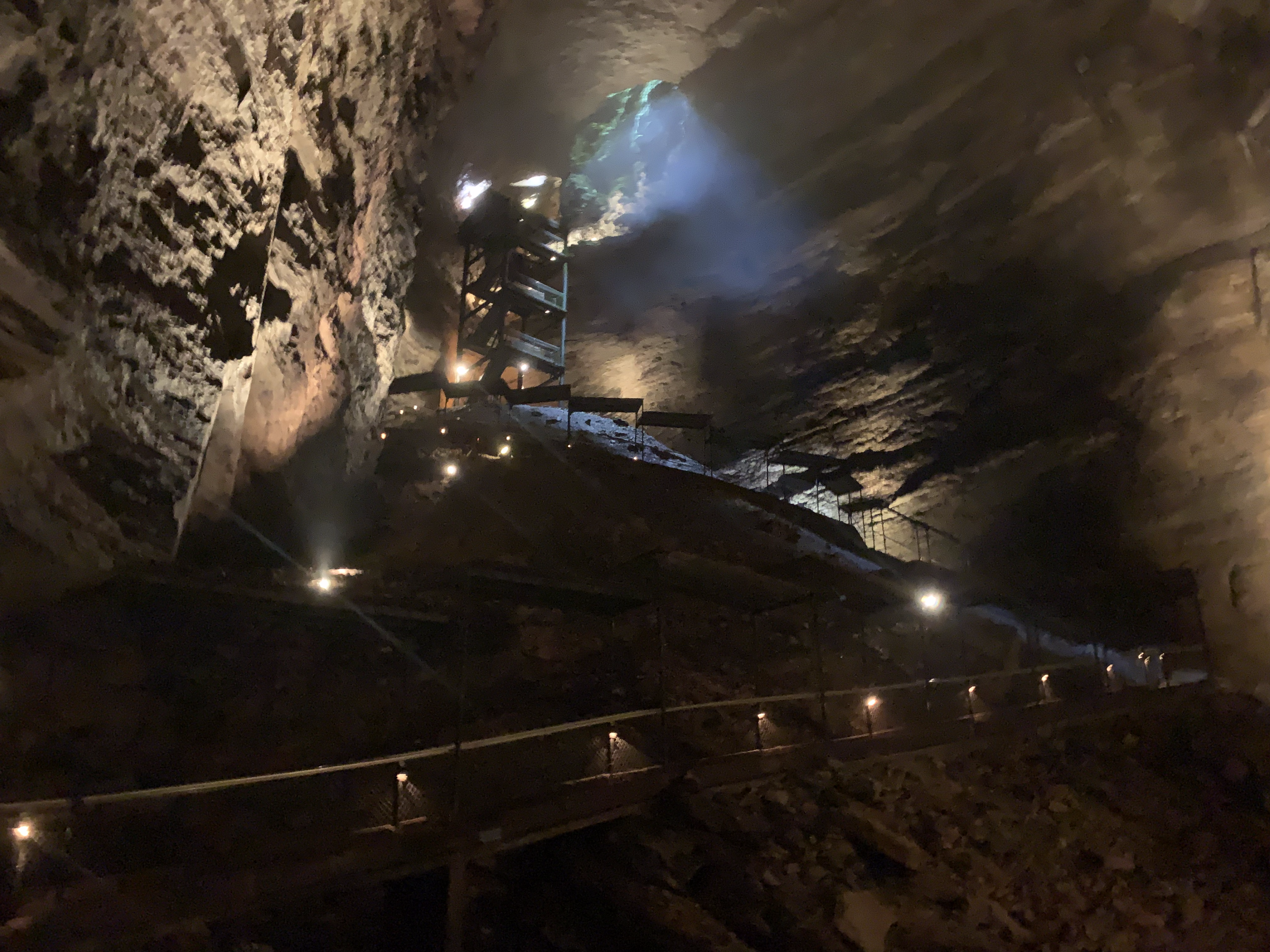
The Cathedral Room's Entrance Staircase Tower as viewed from the landing area of the walkway near the bottom of the rubble pile.

Silver Dollar City is located at the site of one of the Ozarks' oldest attractions, Marvel Cave. Henry T. Blow, a lead mining magnate, explored the cave in 1869 with six miners. They found no lead, but were convinced that the flat ceiling of one room was composed of marble, and so they originally named the cave Marble Cave.

The cave remained undisturbed until 1882 when a group led by T. Hodges Jones and Truman S. Powell entered the cave in hopes of finding lead. Jones and Powell instead found huge amounts of guano and a flat wall which they also believed to be marble. Two years later Jones bought the property and formed the Marble Cave Mining and Manufacturing Company. The company planned a town, Marble City, on the rough hilltop near the cave and in 1884 recorded a plat map at the courthouse in Galena, Missouri. By 1889 much of the guano had been mined from the cave, the marble wall proved to be limestone, and no lead ore was found. The mining company ceased operation.

In 1889, William Henry Lynch, a Canadian miner and dairyman, purchased the cave and a square mile of the surface around the entrance for $10,000 (equivalent to $358,000 in 2025). Lynch, with the aid of his family, proposed to open the cave to sightseers. The Lynches began operation of the sightseeing venture on October 18, 1894. The venture was not immediately profitable and was closed until Lynch raised additional capital to reopen the cave sometime after 1900. The cave has remained open since, making it one of the oldest continuously running tourist attractions in the Ozarks.

After the 1907 publication of Harold Bell Wright's famous novel The Shepherd of the Hills, which depicts the lives of mountain people living in the Ozarks, interest in the region grew rapidly across the country. To accommodate the new influx of visitors traveling to the cave by car, Lynch was determined to bring a road from Branson to the cave. He cut brush and cleared a path for what would become Missouri Route 76, which offered tourists easy access to the cave and helped establish it as a major tourist attraction by the 1920s.

The park still honors the history of Marvel Cave through various tie-ins and references. As part of the backstory for their upcoming Mack Rides roller coaster Miner's Mountain Express, expected to open in spring 2027, a fictional miner named Jedidiah Campbell took the stage at the park's annual Fan Fest in 2026 to announce the Marvel Cave Mining Co. was resuming operations to continue searching for new discoveries in the mine. The company's revival was also used to announce the closure of Thunderation at the conclusion of the 2026 season, with a press release claiming the company forced the park to "vacate the tracks to make way for resumed mining operations."

=== Herschend family ===
When William Lynch died in 1927, ownership of the cave passed to his daughters and the name of the cave was changed to Marvel Cave. The Lynch family operated the cave for nearly fifty years until a Chicago vacuum cleaner salesman, Hugo Herschend, purchased a 99-year lease on the cave in April 1950.

After Hugo's death in 1955, his wife, Mary, took over the day-to-day operations of the venture. With the aid of her two sons, Jack and Peter, she was able to make vast improvements to the cave, including building a narrow-gauge funicular railway whose trains pulled visitors a distance of 218 feet (66 m) from the depths of the cave to the surface.

Once the railway was in operation, the Herschends felt that development of the cave was complete. Therefore, they decided to create another attraction which would bring even more tourists to the cave.

=== New theme park ===
Mary, Jack, and Peter began building an 1880s-style Ozark village on the surface surrounding the site of the cave. Mary wanted authenticity as well as preservation of the area's natural beauty. The themed frontier town was named Silver Dollar City and originally was the site of five shops, a church, a log cabin, and a street production reproducing the feud between the Hatfields and McCoys several times daily.

The name Silver Dollar City was inspired by Ozark Jubilee script writer and publicist Don Richardson after the promotional idea of giving visitors silver dollars in change. The scenic designer for much of the original attraction was Andy Miller, who had been the set designer for the Jubilee in nearby Springfield. Opening day, May 1, 1960, included an appearance by Uncle Cyp and Aunt Sap Brasfield. In its first year, Silver Dollar City drew more than 125,000 people, four times more visitors than had annually toured Marvel Cave. "We discovered we were in the theme park business," Pete Herschend said. In 1968, the park started charging admission.

In 1972 Genevieve Lynch, the last of William Lynch's daughters, died and bequeathed the land under Silver Dollar City and Marvel Cave to the College of the Ozarks and Branson Presbyterian Church. The Herschends continue to operate it.

=== Park expansion ===
In 1976, the Herschends purchased the Goldrush Junction theme park in Pigeon Forge, Tennessee, which they renamed Silver Dollar City Tennessee. In 1986, the Herschends partnered with Dolly Parton and renamed the park Dollywood.

Silver Dollar City expanded its entertainment over the years by adding attractions such as a stage coach ride, a narrow-gauge steam railroad, interactive activities, and various thrill rides. The park is also home to resident craftsmen who can be seen practicing their craft and exhibiting and selling their work to park visitors.

In October 2024, Silver Dollar City announced a 10-year plan to expand into the surrounding area, starting with a resort hotel expected to open in 2027.

=== Pop culture ===
The Clampett family of CBS-TV's The Beverly Hillbillies decided to pay a visit to Silver Dollar City (treated as an actual town, rather than a theme park) to start off the 1969–1970 season. The plotline involved Granny (Irene Ryan) attempting to find a husband for Elly May (Donna Douglas) back in the hills, while Jed (Buddy Ebsen) socialized with hotel clerk Shorty Kellems (Shug Fisher). They visited the blacksmith Shad Heller, soapmaker Granny Ethel Huffman, and woodcarver Peter Engler, and Miss Hathaway (Nancy Kulp) was seen in the Ozark woods. The Hillbillies were from the area surrounding Silver Dollar City and Branson, and references to Jim Owens and his White River float trip business and some Missouri mountain locations were made throughout the show's nine-year run. Five episodes of The Beverly Hillbillies were eventually shot in the park.

The park was featured in the 1992 book The Man Who Loved Clowns.

In 1999, Silver Dollar City was the site for the 14th annual Stihl Timbersports Series Championships. Jason Wynyard became the champion for the third consecutive year.

On December 5, 2007, ABC's Good Morning America spotlighted the park's Christmas festival, "An Old Time Christmas," and declared it as one of the top five holiday events in the country. The park was featured as part of the show's segment called "Good Morning America Lights Up the Holidays."

In early 2026, the made-for-TV movie An Ozark Mountain Christmas was filmed at the park. It centers around two Chicago sisters who were raised in the Ozarks and decide to spend Christmas there to honor their late grandfather, who was a Silver Dollar City woodcarver. Several park locales, including Valley Road Woodcarvers, Brown's Candy Factory, and Hazel's Blown & Cut Glass, are featured. The film was produced by Great American Media for their Great American Family television network, where it premiered on November 8th, 2026, and their Pure Flix streaming service.

== Layout, attractions and general information ==
=== Districts ===
Silver Dollar City is divided into eleven districts.

- Park Entrance
- Main Street
- Homestead Ridge
- Midtown
- Valley Road
- The Grand Exposition
- Rivertown
- Wilson's Farm
- Hugo's Hill Street
- Fire District
- The Plaza

=== Demonstrations ===
- Brown's Candy Factory
- Carrie's Candles
- Duplicating lathe
- Hazel's Blown & Cut Glass
- Heartland Home Furnishings
- Hill Creek Pottery
- Mountain Leather
- Mountain Outfitter's Knives
- Sullivan's Mill
- Valley Road Woodcarvers
- Wilderness Road Blacksmith

=== Recurring shows ===
- Horsecreek Band
- Old-Time Story Time
- Pure Heart
- The Homestead Pickers
- Frontier Follies

=== Rides and attractions ===
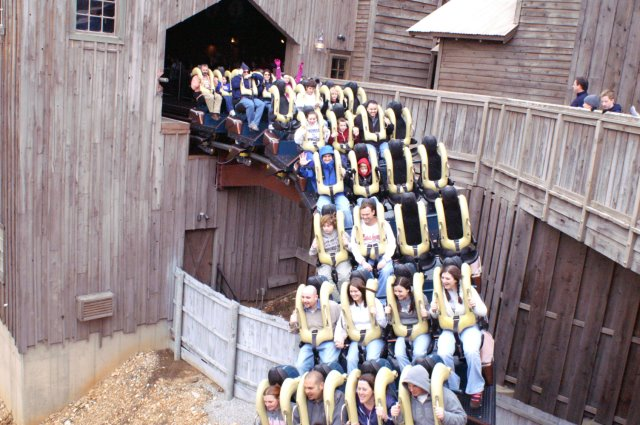
WildFire

==== Roller coasters ====
Coaster	Picture	Opened	Manufacturer	Model	Notes
Fire in the Hole		2024	Rocky Mountain Construction (RMC)	Enclosed Coaster	Guests ride in a dark building, with scenes that tell of a town set ablaze by the Baldknobbers overnight. Based on the original Fire in the Hole that operated at Silver Dollar City from 1972 to 2023.
Grand Exposition Coaster		2006	Zamperla	Family Gravity Coaster 80STD	The park's kid coaster.
Miner's Mountain Express		2027	Mack Rides	Family Mine Train	Expected to open in spring 2027, this will be Mack Rides' first Family Mine Train installation in the world. The coaster will feature two lift hills, a reported 15 moments of airtime (the most for any coaster in Silver Dollar City's history), and will be the longest family coaster in the Midwest.
Outlaw Run		2013	Rocky Mountain Construction (RMC)	Wood/Topper Track Coaster	The world's fourth steepest wooden coaster and the first featuring three inversions. It is the first wooden roller coaster manufactured by Rocky Mountain Construction (RMC) and the first wooden roller coaster with multiple inversions.
Powder Keg		2005	S&S Sansei	Air Launched Coaster	A significant modification and extension of the park's former BuzzSaw Falls water coaster which opened in 1999. The coaster features a pneumatic launch that accelerates the trains to 53 mph in only 2.8 seconds.
Thunderation		1993	Arrow Dynamics	Mine Train Coaster	A steel mine train roller coaster. Originally, the third and fifth cars of each roller coaster train faced backward, but they were repositioned to face forward sometime after the 2010 season. Silver Dollar City announced the closure of Thunderation; its last ride will be on January 2, 2027
Time Traveler		2018	Mack Rides	Xtreme Spinning Coaster	Time Traveler was the first installation of the "Xtreme Spinning Coasters" model produced by Mack Rides, which features spinning trains with an eddy current brake, located underneath each car, to control the rate of spinning. It is the only coaster of its type currently operating in North America. Upon opening, Time Traveler became the tallest and fastest spinning roller coaster, and the first of its kind to feature three inversions.
Wildfire		2001	Bolliger & Mabillard (B&M)	Sitting Coaster	Based on an 1880s Ozarks tale of Dr. Horatio Harris, an inventor who was working on a flying machine. "Wildfire" was the name of the fuel he created for this machine.

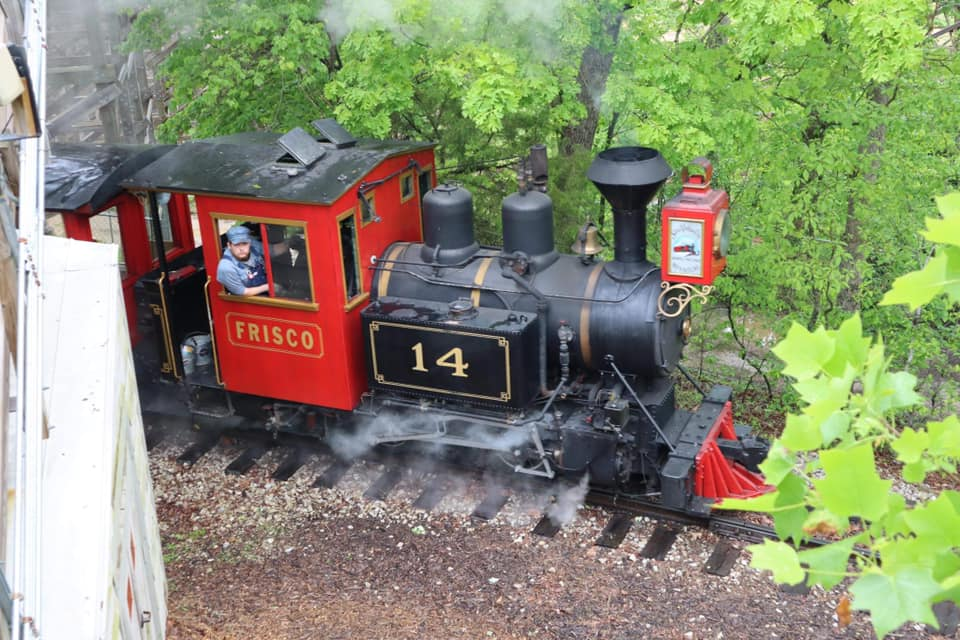
Steam locomotive #14, built in 1938 by German engineering company Orenstein & Koppel, chugs under Outlaw Run.

==== Rides ====
Rides	Opened	Manufacturer	Model	Notes
American Plunge	1981	Barr Engineering	Log Flume	
Electro Spin	2006	Zamperla	Mega Disk'O	
Elephant March	2006	Zamperla	Aero Top Jet	
FireFall	2015	S&S Sansei	Double Shot	Relocated from Celebration City, a short-lived park adjacent to Silver Dollar City also owned by the Herschends.
Fireman's Flyer	2015	Zamperla	Swing Ride	
Fire Spotter	2015	Zamperla		
Fire Wagon Frenzy	2015	Zamperla	Crazy Bus	
Flooded Mine	1968	Silver Dollar City	Indoor Float-Through	A dark ride in which riders help the warden keep inmates from escaping the county prison mine while it floods. Guests use revolver-shaped light guns to shoot small targets around the ride, some of which trigger animations and sounds. The guns keep score using an LCD screen.
Frisco Silver Dollar Line Steam Train	1962	Orenstein & Koppel, Ceskomoravska Kolben-Danek. St. Louis San Francisco Railway, Davenport Locomotive Works, Silver Dollar City	2 ft (610 mm) Narrow-Gauge Steam Railroad	Heritage railroad and family attraction with a variety of engines from German, American and Czech industrial backgrounds. A train robbery skit is held halfway through the 1.6-mile (2.6-km) ride.
Giant Barn Swing	2007	S&S Sansei	Screamin' Swing	
Grandfather's Mansion	1960	Silver Dollar City	Anti-Gravity House	
Happy Frogs	2006	Zamperla	Jump Around	
High-Low Silos	2007			
Hugo and Mary's Carousel	2006		Carousel	
Ladybugs	2006	Zamperla	Jump Around	
Lucky's Dizzy Dogs	2015	Zamperla	Jump Around	
Magnificent Wave Carousel	2006	Zamperla	Flying Carousel	
Mystic River Falls	2020	RES, Barr Engineering	River Rapids	Tallest rapids drop in the western hemisphere. This new ride replaced the former Lost River of the Ozarks rapids ride and, officially, opened to the public on July 21, 2020.
Racing Regatta	2006	Zamperla	Regatta	
Royal Tea Party	2006	Zamperla	Tea Cups	
Mighty Galleon	2006	Zamperla	Galleon	
Tom & Huck's River Blast	2010	Mack Rides	River Battle	
Up the Ladder	2015			
Wings of Wonder	2006	Zamperla	Jump Around	

==== Other attractions ====
- Birdle's Cabin - An authentic log cabin with displays about pioneer life.
- Elsie the Milk Cow – A fake cow with udders that allows guests to pull and retrieve their own "milk".
- Half Dollar Holler – A kids' play and ride area.
- Homestead Animal Barnyard – A petting zoo with animals such as goats, chickens, hens, and other farm animals.
- Marvel Cave – The cave offers two types of tours. The Traditional Cave Tour is a one-hour guided tour through a half mile of lighted passageway. Throughout the tour, geological and historical information is explained. The Lantern Light Tour is a one and a half-hour guided tour through a little over a half mile of unlit passageway. A narrow gauge funicular railway is employed to take visitors from the far end of the cave back to surface level.
- McHaffie's Homestead – A real, hewn-log cabin built in 1843.
- Oak Trail School – A 19th-century school house where everyone is invited to pick a desk, sit down and learn about school in the 1800s.
- Swinging Bridge - A rocking bridge that connects Midtown and Half Dollar Holler.
- Wilderness Church – An old-time church with a view of the Ozark and Boston Mountains of Arkansas. Services are held on Sundays.
- Case Traction Engine - A 1915 propane-fired steam traction engine that executes sawmill operations, typically during the Harvest Festival.

==== Former rides and attractions ====
- Sam's Minin’ Shack – Closed in 1968 and re-themed as Grandfather's Mansion.
- BuzzSaw Falls – This was a roller coaster that incorporated a water type boat for the vehicle. The ride opened in 1999 and was largely promoted, however it was constantly plagued with mechanical difficulties. It was closed in 2003 and construction began to modify the ride into the current Powder Keg: A Blast in the Wilderness, which opened in 2005.
- Rube Dugan's Diving Bell – This was an attraction that simulated a Jules Verne-style fantasy submarine ride, the first simulation ride of its kind. Disney Imagineers told Silver Dollar City that it would be hard to do but secretly advised them on how to create the attraction. It was removed in the mid-1980s to make room for the Lost River of the Ozarks, a ride that could run more people through per hour. Slim Pickens was the voice of Rube Dugan.
- Lost River of the Ozarks – This ride was a whitewater rapids adventure using 6-person inner tube shaped boats. Signage cautioned riders that they would get "bathtub wet." It was constructed on the former site of Rube Dugan's Diving Bell. The Lost River of the Ozarks opened May 4, 1985, at a cost of $2 million and was demolished following the 2018 season. This ride has been replaced by a new river rapids ride called Mystic River Falls, which officially opened to the public on July 21, 2020.
- Jim Owens Float Trip – This was an outdoor boat ride (1969 to 1980) around a man-made river with animatronics. Silver Dollar City removed this ride after the 1980 season and remodeled it into the American Plunge log flume. However, the original channels still exist and can be seen as guests make their way to Wildfire and from the queue line for American Plunge.
- Stagecoach – In the early years of the park, an authentic stagecoach took guests on a bumpy ride around the perimeter of the town square pulled by sturdy draft horses. It was removed five years after the park opened.
- Runaway Ore Cart – This was a small children's roller coaster, located where Tom and Huck's Riverblast is located. It was removed after the 2004 season.
- Tom Sawyer's Landing – Added to the park in 1984, this play area featured rope towers and rides with Becky's Carousel as its center piece. Silver Dollar City's craftsmen hand carved each horse on the carousel. The most notable aspect of the structure were the large rope nets upon which visitors bounced and climbed.
- Huck Finn's Hideaway – This was a large playhouse built several stories above the ground on stilts. Visitors entered the attraction via a tiny spiral staircase built into a fake hollow tree. They had to crawl on hands and knees across a narrow bridge from the top of the hollow tree to the tree house. The exit from the attraction led visitors through an artificial cave featuring an infinite mirror illusion and Christmas lights to make it appear that they were walking through a large open space with "stars".
- Waterworks Waterboggan – A flume-type water ride, mostly through a dark tunnel.
- Splash Harbor – was located near the bathrooms of the former Geyser Gulch.
- Geyser Gulch – This was an area built in 1997 with two large buildings. Kids could run throughout the building located by the "lake" and shoot each other with water guns, while dodging balls being thrown by other kids or through tubes. There were also water sprinklers outside the building where children can run through. Geyser Gulch closed permanently on August 3, 2014, to make way for Fireman's Landing, which opened the following year in 2015.
- Fire in the Hole (1972–2023) - The park's first roller coaster, featuring scenes through the burning town of Marmaros, set ablaze by the Baldknobbers. The ride featured three small drops culminating in a splashdown ending. The original Fire in the Hole closed at the end of the 2023 season in preparation for the opening of the new Fire in the Hole in 2024.

=== Festivals ===
Throughout the operating season Silver Dollar City hosts eight different festivals:

- Spring Exposition (April-May): Showcasing of local crafts and food in the Grand Exposition section of the park.
- Bluegrass & BBQ Festival (May): A celebration of bluegrass music and BBQ from across the nation.
- Summer Celebration (June-August): An event with oversized games, fireworks, drone show, and dance parties.
- Southern Gospel Picnic (August – September): Gospel music is showcased during this festival along with picnic style dinners.
- Concerts in Echo Hollow (Select Dates): Various concerts in the Echo Hollow® Amphitheatre.
- Harvest Festival & Pumpkins in the City (September – October): A salute to an old time harvest celebration featuring visiting craftsmen and large-sized pumpkin sculptures.
- An Old Time Christmas (November – December): A traditional holiday Christmas celebration with special shows, foods, and other attractions. In addition, the park is decorated with 6.5 million Christmas lights and a five-story special effects Christmas tree. In 2025, the park also added the grand fir in the Plaza, a large real grand fir tree with a nightly Rockefeller Center-style lighting ceremony.

==== Former festivals ====
Throughout its operation, Silver Dollar City has hosted different festivals that have since been replaced.

- Festival of Wonder (April): Replaced by Street Fest
- Street Fest (Spring): Replaced by Spring Exposition.
- Family Fest – Replaced by Star-Spangled Summer in 2014.
- Star Spangled Summer- Replaced by National Kids Fest in 2022
- World-Fest (April – May) - An international event showcasing different cultures and performers from around the world; replaced by Festival of Wonder.
- National KidsFest (Summer) -A summer event celebrating kids and fun. Ran until 2023.
- Spring National Crafts Festival (New in 1977) - Featuring fine furniture, stained glass, calligraphy, and macramé.

=== Stages, multipurpose buildings and theaters ===
- The Gazebo
- Carousel Barn
- Dockside Theater
- The Grand Exposition Stage -- A small stage that hosts dance parties during the Spring Exposition. Located between New Fire in the Hole and The Grand Exposition.
- Riverfront Playhouse – The “Deep Woods” area increased the park's size by 25%. The district eventually introduced the 600 seat Court House Theatre in 1979. The inaugural production was The Chicken Thief, a comedy depicting the trial of a strange man named Melvin. The theatre's name has changed over the years from Courthouse to Gaslight and on to its current name. Past shows have included Timothy Turnbuckle's Traveling Time Machine, Hoedown, and Hatfield's Haint. During the Christmas season, a nativity play of the Nativity of Jesus is given.
- The Frisco Barn
- McHaffie's Homestead Front Porch
- Silver Dollar Saloon – The saloon opened to the public in 1973 with can-can dancers and singing bartenders. Carry Nation brought her temperance union to the city to shut the house of ill repute down for good. Unfortunately for Ms. Nation, she didn't succeed. The show has changed throughout the years to include Mean Murphy, the saloon's arch enemy; Miss Tilly, the loveable yet dim-witted dance hall girl; and Choctaw Charlie and his Wild West show. The show is billed as “Good clean fun.” There is no cursing, chewing or spitting at the Silver Dollar and root beer is served as an alternative to beer.
- Echo Hollow Amphitheatre is an amphitheatre with seating for 4,000. The amphitheater opened in 1983 as a dinner theatre encouraging guests to stay once Silver Dollar City closed for the day. Featured shows within the amphitheater have included Harmonies from the Hollow, Echo Hollow Jubilee, Hotrods and Hair-dos, and GAC Country Nights. Each spring Silver Dollar City's Young Christian Youth Rally is held at Echo Hollow. This Rally features ministers, speakers and musical guests like Newsboys, Kutless and Sixpence None the Richer. The amphitheater also hosts nationally known musical artists such as, Gladys Knight, Peter, Paul and Mary, Nitty Gritty Dirt Band and Ricky Skaggs.
- The Boatworks Theater
- The Opera House – The 1,000 seat performance venue opened in 1994 with the Broadway-style production Listen to the River. Since its opening the theatre has played host to other large scale in-house productions including American Spirit,, a patriotic musical; For the Glory, a Civil War drama; Headin’ West, a musical drama about Western expansion; and A Dickens’ Christmas Carol, a high-energy, musical telling of Charles Dickens’ Christmas classic, A Christmas Carol.
- Pickin' Shed
- Red Gold Heritage Hall – To commemorate Silver Dollar City's 40th anniversary this 25,000-square-foot (2,300 m^{2}) multipurpose building opened in 2000. Themed after a turn-of-the-century tomato canning factory, the hall is capable of hosting exhibitions and shows with seating up to 1,800 guests. Festival food fills the building during events. Previously, the town of Bethlehem was recreated each Christmas season, but has since been moved to the Riverfront Playhouse in order to accommodate a stage production of It's a Wonderful Life.

== See also ==
- List of amusement parks
