= Thunderation =

Ride at Silver Dollar City

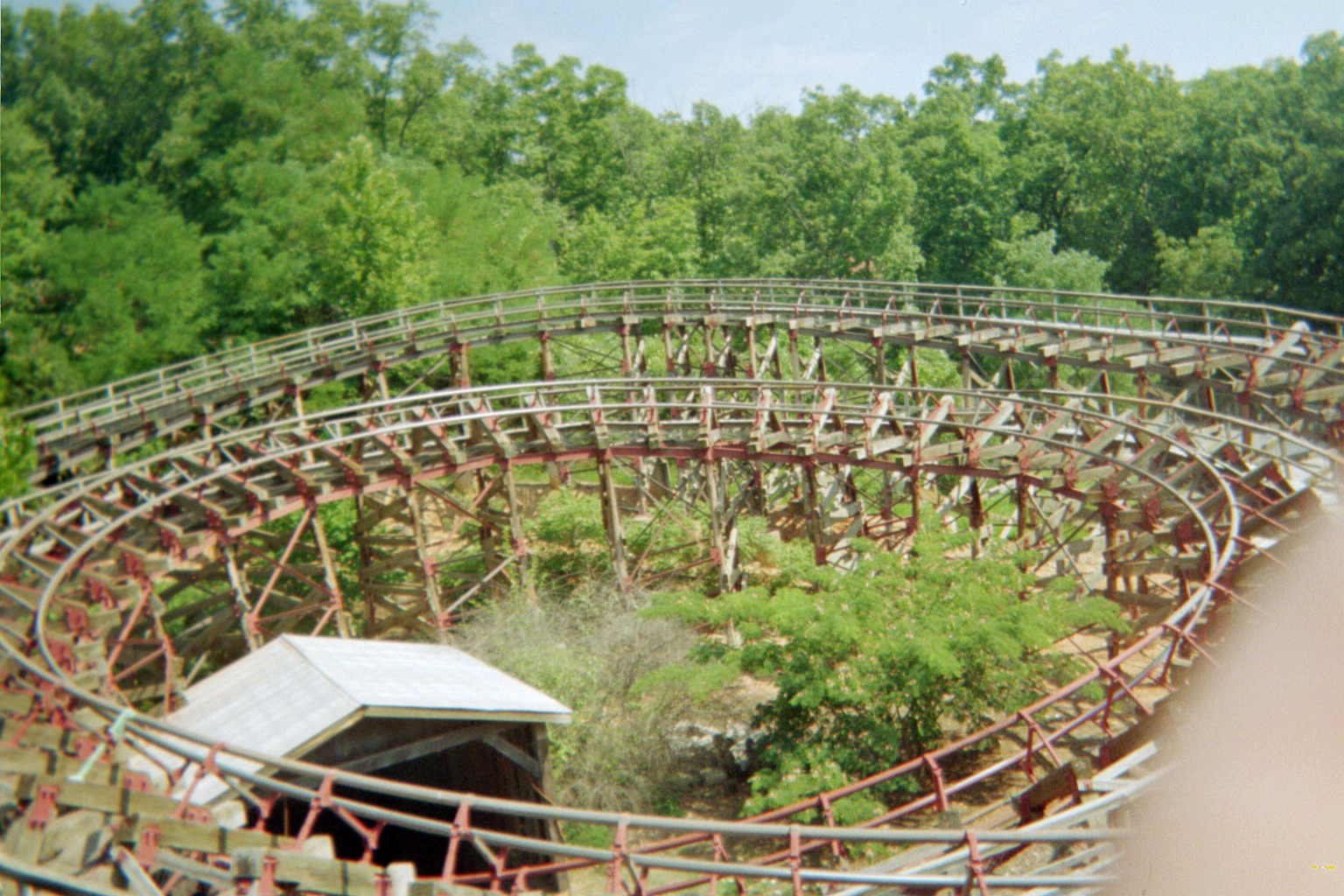
- Thunderation's helix

Silver Dollar City
- Location: Silver Dollar City
- Coordinates: 36.6684°N 93.3379°W
- Status: Operating
- Opening date: April 10, 1993

General statistics
- Type: Steel – Mine Train
- Manufacturer: Arrow Dynamics
- Model: Mine Train
- Track layout: Terrain
- Lift/launch system: Chain lift hill
- Height: 81 ft (25 m)
- Length: 3,022 ft (921 m)
- Speed: 48 mph (77 km/h)
- Inversions: 0
- Duration: 2:10
- Height restriction: 42 in (107 cm)
- Trains: 2 trains with 6 cars. Riders arranged 2 across in 3 rows, with the exception of the first car, which has 2 rows, for a total of 34 riders per train.
- Thunderation at RCDB

Thunderation (Stylized as ThuNderaTion) is a steel mine train roller coaster located at Silver Dollar City in Branson, Missouri. Manufactured by Arrow Dynamics, the ride opened in 1993. Originally, the third and fifth cars of each roller coaster train faced backward, but they were repositioned to face forward sometime after the 2010 season. On February 16, 2026, Silver Dollar City announced that Thunderation would be closing permanently on January 2, 2027.

== Ride experience ==
The train (the front part of the roller coaster looks like the locomotive of a steam train) leaves the station, takes a 180 degree right turn, goes straight forward, and makes a 180 degree left turn. The train enters a right turn helix, followed by a tunnel. Next, the train takes a 270 degree left turn. After going straight the train takes another 90 degree right turn drops into a short tunnel. The train goes up the lift hill, out of the tunnel. There is a 270 degree left turn. Finally, the train goes down the drop, and turns right 90 degrees into the station.

On some ride signs, the name is stylized as "ThuNderaTion", a reference to TNT to coincide with the ride's mining theme.
