= Wildfire (Silver Dollar City) =

Steel roller coaster

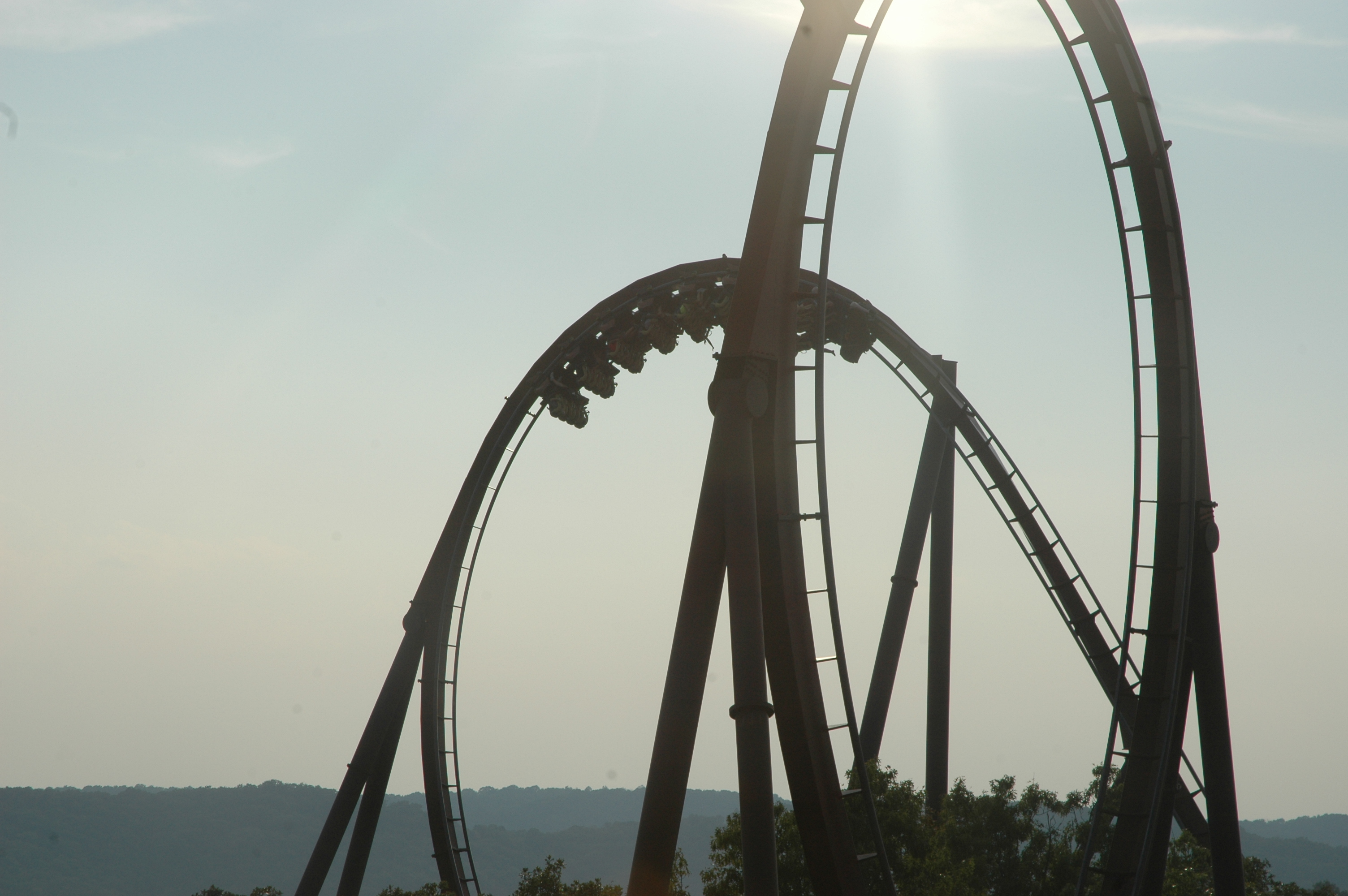
- One of Wildfire's trains navigating the Immellmann loop, with the vertical loop in the foreground

Silver Dollar City
- Location: Silver Dollar City
- Park section: Hugo's Hill Street
- Coordinates: 36°40′07″N 93°20′33″W
- Status: Operating
- Opening date: April 4, 2001
- Cost: $14 million

General statistics
- Type: Steel
- Manufacturer: Bolliger & Mabillard
- Designer: Werner Stengel
- Model: Sitting Coaster
- Track layout: Custom
- Lift/launch system: Chain lift hill
- Height: 120 ft (37 m)
- Drop: 155 ft (47 m)
- Length: 3,073 ft (937 m)
- Speed: 66 mph (106 km/h)
- Inversions: 5
- Duration: 2:14
- Capacity: 1024/512 riders per hour
- Height restriction: 52 in (132 cm)
- Trains: 2 trains with 8 cars. Riders are arranged 4 across in a single row for a total of 32 riders per train.
- Wildfire at RCDB

Wildfire is a steel roller coaster located at Silver Dollar City in Branson, Missouri. Manufactured by Bolliger & Mabillard, the $14-million ride opened to the public on April 4, 2001. It is themed as a flying machine developed by a fictional 1880s Ozark inventor.

Wildfire stands 120 feet (37 m) tall with a drop of 155 feet (47 m) and features a maximum speed of 66 mph (106 km/h). Along its 3,073 feet (937 m) of track, riders experience five inversions including an Immelmann loop, a vertical loop, a cobra roll, and a corkscrew.

== History ==
In July 2000, Silver Dollar City announced that they would be adding the Wildfire roller coaster to their park in April 2001. At a cost of $14 million, the ride would be the most expensive attraction in the park's history. The park commissioned Bolliger & Mabillard (B&M) to build a five-inversion Sitting Coaster, which would sit on a 3-acre (1.2 ha) plot of land, while also featuring an 1880s-themed laboratory station. By the time the ride was announced, construction was already underway in an undeveloped portion of land in the outskirts of the park. All of the ride's footings were in place with some of its steel supports already erected. Construction was expected to be completed in early January the following year, leaving three months for testing, landscaping, and theming. On April 4, 2001, Wildfire officially opened to the public.

== Characteristics ==
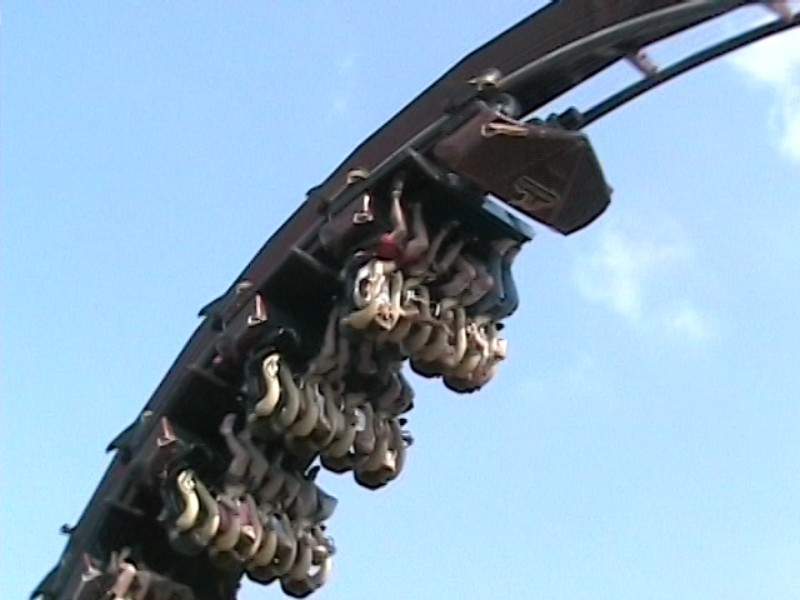
A train navigating one of Wildfire's five inversions

The 3,073-foot-long (937 m) Wildfire features five inversions including an Immelmann loop, a vertical loop, a cobra roll and a corkscrew. The park's existing terrain (situated on the Ozark Mountains) is utilised to allow a 120-foot-tall (37 m) lift hill to be followed by a first drop of 155 feet (47 m). Riders reach a top speed of 66 miles per hour (106 km/h) on the 2-minute, 14-second ride. The track was manufactured by Clermont Steel Fabricators located in Batavia, Ohio. Wildfire operates with two trains (generally with one train loading/unloading while the other runs the course, each featuring eight cars. Each car seats riders four abreast with ratcheting over-the-shoulder restraints. This configuration allows the ride to achieve a theoretical hourly capacity of 1,024 riders per hour when operating with two trains and 512 riders per hour with one train.

Wildfire is located in the Hugo's Hill Street district of Silver Dollar City. It is themed around the story of an 1880s Ozark inventor named Dr. Horatio Harris. Harris had an aim to create a powered flying contraption for flight across the Ozark Mountains. The ride's name refers to the fuel he developed for his flying machine. The ride's queue and station area are modelled as the laboratory and invention warehouse of Harris. Riders eventually board his Wildfire-powered flying machine, the steel roller coaster. One year after the opening of the roller coaster Silver Dollar City began selling the Wildfire Burger, a hot and spicy hamburger themed after the ride.

== Ride experience ==
After leaving the station, the train makes a 180-degree right turn and climbs 120 feet (37 m) up a chain lift hill. The train turns 90 degrees to the left after reaching the top, then descends 155 feet (47 m) down the first drop. This is followed by an Immelmann loop, a vertical loop, and a cobra roll – the latter of which inverts riders twice. Then the train heads up a banked curve into a corkscrew and a 230-degree turn into the final brake run.

== Reception ==
Rick Baker, Silver Dollar City's vice president of corporate development and design, expected the addition of the ride would increase season pass sales by 9% to 250,000. In 2001, the park was visited by a total of 2.1 million people.

In Amusement Today's annual Golden Ticket Awards, Wildfire ranked in the top 50 steel roller coasters three times. In 2003 it debuted at position 40, before dropping to 46 in 2004 and 49 in 2005. As of 2012 it has not returned to the listing.
